= 2011 World Judo Championships – Men's 81 kg =

Judo competition

Judo Men's 81 kg at the 2011 World Judo Championships
- Venue: Accor Arena
- Location: Paris, France
- Date: 25 August 2011
- Competitors: 83 from 63 nations

Medalists
gold medal	Kim Jae-Bum (2nd title)	South Korea
silver medal	Srđan Mrvaljević	Montenegro
bronze medal	Leandro Guilheiro	Brazil
bronze medal	Sergiu Toma	Moldova

Competition at external databases
- Links: IJF • JudoInside

The men's 81 kg competition of the 2011 World Judo Championships was held on August 25.

== Medalists ==
Gold	Silver	Bronze
Kim Jae-Bum (KOR)	Srđan Mrvaljević (MNE)	Leandro Guilheiro (BRA); Sergiu Toma (MDA)

== Results ==
=== Pool A ===
First round fights

	Score	
Kim Jae-Bum (South Korea)	001–000	(Mongolia) Uuganbaatar Otgonbaatar
Farmon Kabulov (Uzbekistan)	000–100	(Cuba) Osmay Cruz
Michel Mbassa (Cameroon)	000–101	(Canada) Antoine Valois-Fortier
Ivan Nifontov (Russia)	100–000	(Turkey) Ahmet Sari
Emmanuel Lucenti (Argentina)	111–000	(Pakistan) Karamat Butt
Seyni Faf (Niger)	000–100	(Algeria) Abderahmane Benamadi

Second Round
(South Korea) Kim Jae-Bum	102
(Turkmenistan) Azizjan Hojakulyev	000
(Cuba) Osmay Cruz	000
(Belgium) Joachim Bottieau	001
(China) Si Rijigawa	100
(North Macedonia) Vancho Sarafov	000
(Canada) Antoine Valois-Fortier	000
(Germany) Ole Bischof	002
(Tajikistan) Sherali Bozorov	000
(Argentina) Emmanuel Lucenti	100
(Brazil) Flávio Canto	100
(Mexico) Karim Rezc	000
(Ukraine) Vitalii Dudchyk	102
(Algeria) Abderahmane Benamadi	002

Quarterfinals
(South Korea) Kim Jae-Bum	101
(Belgium) Joachim Bottieau	000
(China) Si Rijigawa	001
(Germany) Ole Bischof	100
(Russia) Ivan Nifontov	100
(Argentina) Emmanuel Lucenti	000
(Brazil) Flávio Canto	100
(Ukraine) Vitalii Dudchyk	000

Semifinals
(South Korea) Kim Jae-Bum	010
(Germany) Ole Bischof	000
(Russia) Ivan Nifontov	011
(Brazil) Flávio Canto	000

Final
(South Korea) Kim Jae-Bum	011
(Russia) Ivan Nifontov	000

=== Pool B ===
First round fights

	Score	
Valeriu Duminica (Romania)	110–000	(Madagascar) Fetra Ratsimiziva
Watcharin Jampawong (Thailand)	000–110	(Fiji) Josateki Naulu
Jaromir Msuil (Czech Republic)	100–000	(Curaçao) Reginald de Windt
Miroljub Ivezić (Serbia)	010–001	(Peru) German Velazco
Avtandil Tchriikishvili (Georgia (country))	100–000	(Burkina Faso) Hermann Monne

Second Round
(Japan) Takahiro Nakai	001
(Portugal) Diogo Lima	000
(Romania) Valeriu Duminica	000
(Italy) Antonio Ciano	001
(Azerbaijan) Elkhan Rajabli	110
(Fiji) Josateki Naulu	000
(Zambia) Boas Munyonga	000
(Czech Republic) Jaromir Msuil	010
(United States) Travis Stevens	000
(Netherlands) Guillaume Elmont	001
(Serbia) Miroljub Ivezić	000
(France) Loic Pietri	100
(Hungary) Sándor Nagysolymosi	001
(Georgia (country)) Avtandil Tchriikishvili	110

Quarterfinals
(Japan) Takahiro Nakai	001
(Italy) Antonio Ciano	000
(Azerbaijan) Elkhan Rajabli	101
(Czech Republic) Jaromir Msuil	000
(Netherlands) Guillaume Elmont	000
(France) Loic Pietri	001
(Kazakhstan) Sayat Shamshiyev	000
(Georgia (country)) Avtandil Tchriikishvili	011

Semifinals
(Japan) Takahiro Nakai	001
(Azerbaijan) Elkhan Rajabli	011
(France) Loic Pietri	010
(Georgia (country)) Avtandil Tchriikishvili	000

Final
(Azerbaijan) Elkhan Rajabli	010
(France) Loic Pietri	111

=== Pool C ===
First round fights

	Score	
Tuvshinjargal Gan (Mongolia)	000–010	(Iran) Amir Ghaseminejad
Omar Simmonds Pea (Panama)	000–001	(Togo) Sacha Denanyoh
Francesco Bruyere (Italy)	000–102	(France) Alain Schmitt
Awad Naemi (Qatar)	000–100	(Hungary) Laszlo Csoknyai
Kipyego Sang (Kenya)	000–110	(Moldova) Sergiu Toma

Second Round
(Brazil) Leandro Guilheiro	010
(Colombia) Pedro Castro	000
(Germany) Sven Maresch	000
(Iran) Amir Ghaseminejad	001
(Togo) Sacha Denanyoh	000
(Senegal) Baye Diawara	100
(France) Alain Schmitt	100
(Canada) Guillaume Perrault	001
(Russia) Sirazhudin Magomedov	100
(Belarus) Aliaksandr Stsiashenka	000
(United States) Harry St Leger	000
(Moldova) Sergiu Toma	100
(Uzbekistan) Yakhyo Imamov	100
(Georgia (country)) Levan Tsiklauri	010

Quarterfinals
(Brazil) Leandro Guilheiro	010
(Iran) Amir Ghaseminejad	000
(Senegal) Baye Diawara	000
(France) Alain Schmitt	101
(Russia) Sirazhudin Magomedov	100
(Hungary) Laszlo Csoknyai	000
(Moldova) Sergiu Toma	100
(Uzbekistan) Yakhyo Imamov	000

Semifinals
(Brazil) Leandro Guilheiro	001
(France) Alain Schmitt	001
(Russia) Sirazhudin Magomedov	001
(Moldova) Sergiu Toma	100

Final
(Brazil) Leandro Guilheiro	001
(Moldova) Sergiu Toma	000

=== Pool D ===
First round fights

	Score	
Elnur Mammadli (Azerbaijan)	010–000	(Croatia) Tomislav Marijanović
Aleksej Nefedov (Serbia)	010–000	(Latvia) Konstantins Ovchinnikovs
Artem Vasylenko (Ukraine)	012–000	(Iceland) Hermann Unnarsson
Euan Burton (United Kingdom)	100–000	(Kazakhstan) Islam Bozbayev
Victor Ahiavor (Ghana)	000–110	(Turkmenistan) Rowsen Amandurdyyew
Farhod Rahimov (Tajikistan)	001–000	(Sweden) Robin Pacek

Second Round
(Azerbaijan) Elnur Mammadli	101
(Slovakia) Marian Benkoczky	000
(Morocco) Safouane Attaf	100
(Australia) Brent Iverson	000
(Serbia) Aleksej Nefedov	101
(Angola) Angelo Antonio	000
(Slovenia) Aljaz Sedej	000
(Ukraine) Artem Vasylenko	100
(United Kingdom) Euan Burton	000
(Montenegro) Srđan Mrvaljević	001
(South Korea) Kim Min-kyu	010
(Japan) Masahiro Takamatsu	000
(Turkmenistan) Rowsen Amandurdyyew	000
(Kyrgyzstan) Alimbek Dzhusupov	110
(Haiti) Richardson Duverge	000
(Tajikistan) Farhod Rahimov	100

Quarterfinals
(Azerbaijan) Elnur Mammadli	000
(Morocco) Safouane Attaf	000
(Serbia) Aleksej Nefedov	000
(Ukraine) Artem Vasylenko	110
(Montenegro) Srđan Mrvaljević	100
(South Korea) Kim Min-kyu	000
(Kyrgyzstan) Alimbek Dzhusupov	000
(Tajikistan) Farhod Rahimov	100

Semifinals
(Azerbaijan) Elnur Mammadli	000
(Ukraine) Artem Vasylenko	112
(Montenegro) Srđan Mrvaljević	101
(Tajikistan) Farhod Rahimov	000

Final
(Ukraine) Artem Vasylenko	001
(Montenegro) Srđan Mrvaljević	101

=== Repechage ===
Repechage		Third place
(Russia) Ivan Nifontov	000
(Azerbaijan) Elkhan Rajabli	011	(Azerbaijan) Elkhan Rajabli	000
		(Brazil) Leandro Guilheiro	100

Repechage		Third place
(Moldova) Sergiu Toma	100
(Ukraine) Artem Vasylenko	000	(Moldova) Sergiu Toma	100
		(France) Loic Pietri	000

=== Finals ===
Semi-finals
(South Korea) Kim Jae-Bum	010
(France) Loic Pietri	000
(Brazil) Leandro Guilheiro	003
(Montenegro) Srđan Mrvaljević	010

Final
(South Korea) Kim Jae-Bum	011
(Montenegro) Srđan Mrvaljević	010
