= 2014 World Judo Championships – Men's 81 kg =

Judo competition

Judo Men's 81 kg at the 2014 World Judo Championships
- Venue: Traktor Ice Arena
- Location: Chelyabinsk, Russia
- Date: 28 August 2014
- Competitors: 64 from 56 nations
- Total prize money: 14,000$

Medalists
gold medal	Avtandil Tchrikishvili (1st title)	Georgia
silver medal	Antoine Valois-Fortier	Canada
bronze medal	Loïc Pietri	France
bronze medal	Ivan Nifontov	Russia

Competition at external databases
- Links: IJF • JudoInside

The men's 81 kg competition of the 2014 World Judo Championships was held on 28 August.

== Medalists ==
Gold	Silver	Bronze
Avtandil Tchrikishvili (GEO)	Antoine Valois-Fortier (CAN)	Loïc Pietri (FRA); Ivan Nifontov (RUS)

== Results ==
=== Finals ===
Semi-finals
(Georgia (country)) Avtandil Tchrikishvili	100
(France) Alain Schmitt	001
(France) Loïc Pietri	000
(Canada) Antoine Valois-Fortier	000

Final
(Georgia (country)) Avtandil Tchrikishvili	010
(Canada) Antoine Valois-Fortier	000

=== Repechage ===
Repechage		Third place
(Japan) Takanori Nagase	000
(Lebanon) Nacif Elias	000	(Japan) Takanori Nagase	000
		(France) Loïc Pietri	010

Repechage		Third place
(Russia) Ivan Nifontov	010
(Brazil) Victor Penalber	000	(Russia) Ivan Nifontov	000
		(France) Alain Schmitt	000

=== Pool A ===
First Round
(Georgia (country)) Avtandil Tchrikishvili	100
(Czech Republic) Jaromír Musil	000
(Belgium) Joachim Bottieau	100
(Denmark) Benjamin Kjeldsen	000
(Croatia) Tomislav Marijanović	000
(Portugal) Carlos Luz	002
(Tajikistan) Farhod Rahimov	000
(Moldova) Valeriu Duminica	001
(Japan) Takanori Nagase	100
(Zambia) Boas Munyonga	000
(Kyrgyzstan) Tariel Usenov	000
(Italy) Massimiliano Carollo	102
(New Zealand) Ivica Pavlinic	000
(Montenegro) Srđan Mrvaljević	100
(Mexico) German Ayala	000
(Uzbekistan) Shakhzodbek Sabirov	100

Quarterfinals
(Georgia (country)) Avtandil Tchrikishvili	001
(Belgium) Joachim Bottieau	000
(Portugal) Carlos Luz	102
(Moldova) Valeriu Duminica	000
(Japan) Takanori Nagase	111
(Italy) Massimiliano Carollo	000
(Montenegro) Srđan Mrvaljević	000
(Uzbekistan) Shakhzodbek Sabirov	100

Semifinals
(Georgia (country)) Avtandil Tchrikishvili	100
(Portugal) Carlos Luz	000
(Japan) Takanori Nagase	100
(Uzbekistan) Shakhzodbek Sabirov	000

Final
(Georgia (country)) Avtandil Tchrikishvili	000
(Japan) Takanori Nagase	000

=== Pool B ===
First Round
(Germany) Sven Märsch	000
(France) Alain Schmitt	000
(Argentina) Emmanuel Lucenti	101
(Kuwait) Meshal Sheaibi	000
(Spain) Adrián Nacimiento	110
(China) Zhang Wentao	000
(Peru) José Arroyo	000
(Gabon) Paul Kibikai	001
(United States) Travis Stevens	000
(Hungary) László Csoknyai	000
(Kazakhstan) Rinat Ibragimov	101
(Armenia) Andranik Chaparyan	001
(Dominican Republic) Marcos Figuereo	000
(Iran) Amir Ghaseminejad	100
(Lebanon) Nacif Elias	000
(Mongolia) Otgonbaataryn Uuganbaatar	000

Quarterfinals
(France) Alain Schmitt	100
(Argentina) Emmanuel Lucenti	000
(Spain) Adrián Nacimiento	100
(Gabon) Paul Kibikai	000
(Hungary) László Csoknyai	111
(Kazakhstan) Rinat Ibragimov	001
(Iran) Amir Ghaseminejad	000
(Lebanon) Nacif Elias	010

Semifinals
(France) Alain Schmitt	103
(Spain) Adrián Nacimiento	000
(Hungary) László Csoknyai	000
(Lebanon) Nacif Elias	100

Final
(France) Alain Schmitt	000
(Lebanon) Nacif Elias	000

=== Pool C ===
First Round
(France) Loïc Pietri	010
(South Korea) Lee Seung-su	000
(Portugal) Diogo Lima	101
(El Salvador) Juan Turcios	000
(Argentina) Alfredo Effron	000
(Belarus) Aliaksandr Stsiashenka	110
(Sweden) Robin Pacek	110
(Yemen) Hussein Al-Jarrah	000
(Hungary) Szabolcs Krizsán	000
(Italy) Antonio Ciano	001
(United Arab Emirates) Mihail Marchitan	000
(Russia) Ivan Nifontov	100
(Greece) Roman Moustopoulos	100
(Fiji) Josateki Naulu	011
(Romania) Cristian Bodirlau	101
(Madagascar) Fetra Ratsimiziva	000

Quarterfinals
(France) Loïc Pietri	011
(Portugal) Diogo Lima	000
(Belarus) Aliaksandr Stsiashenka	000
(Sweden) Robin Pacek	110
(Italy) Antonio Ciano	000
(Russia) Ivan Nifontov	001
(Greece) Roman Moustopoulos	111
(Romania) Cristian Bodirlau	000

Semifinals
(France) Loïc Pietri	010
(Sweden) Robin Pacek	000
(Russia) Ivan Nifontov	101
(Greece) Roman Moustopoulos	000

Final
(France) Loïc Pietri	002
(Russia) Ivan Nifontov	000

=== Pool D ===
First Round
(Brazil) Victor Penalber	100
(Armenia) Rafael Davtyan	000
(Burundi) Samuel Kwitonda	000
(Uruguay) Alain Aprahamian	100
(Poland) Łukasz Błach	100
(Philippines) Kodo Nakano	000
(Latvia) Konstantīns Ovčiņņikovs	000
(Austria) Marcel Ott	000
(Canada) Antoine Valois-Fortier	000
(Uzbekistan) Shukhratjon Arslanov	000
(Tunisia) Abdelaziz Ben Ammar	100
(Turkmenistan) Tejen Tejenov	000
(Georgia (country)) Ushangi Margiani	011
(Colombia) Derian Castro	000
(North Korea) Pak Hong-wi	110
(Bolivia) Kevin Justiniano	000

Quarterfinals
(Brazil) Victor Penalber	101
(Uruguay) Alain Aprahamian	000
(Poland) Łukasz Błach	110
(Austria) Marcel Ott	001
(Canada) Antoine Valois-Fortier	010
(Tunisia) Abdelaziz Ben Ammar	000
(Georgia (country)) Ushangi Margiani	000
(North Korea) Pak Hong-wi	010

Semifinals
(Brazil) Victor Penalber	011
(Poland) Łukasz Błach	000
(Canada) Antoine Valois-Fortier	100
(North Korea) Pak Hong-wi	000

Final
(Brazil) Victor Penalber	001
(Canada) Antoine Valois-Fortier	010

== Prize money ==
The sums listed bring the total prizes awarded to $14,000 for the individual event.

Medal	Total	Judoka	Coach
Gold	$6,000	$4,800	$1,200
Silver	$4,000	$3,200	$800
Bronze	$2,000	$1,600	$400
