= 2013 World Judo Championships – Men's 81 kg =

Judo competition

Judo Men's 81 kg at the 2013 World Judo Championships
- Venue: Ginásio do Maracanãzinho
- Location: Rio de Janeiro, Brazil
- Date: 29 August 2013
- Competitors: 72 from 59 nations

Medalists
gold medal	Loic Pietri (1st title)	France
silver medal	Avtandil Tchrikishvili	Georgia
bronze medal	Ivan Vorobev	Russia
bronze medal	Alain Schmitt	France

Competition at external databases
- Links: IJF • JudoInside

The men's 81 kg competition of the 2013 World Judo Championships was held on August 29.

== Medalists ==
Gold	Silver	Bronze
Loic Pietri (FRA)	Avtandil Tchrikishvili (GEO)	Ivan Vorobev (RUS); Alain Schmitt (FRA)

== Results ==
=== Pool A ===
First round fights

	Score	
Neal van de Kamer (Netherlands)	100–000	(Malaysia) Mohammed Noor
Borche Tosheski (North Macedonia)	000–110	(Russia) Ivan Vorobev

Second Round
(Brazil) Victor Penalber	100
(Fiji) Josateki Naulu	000
(Germany) Alexander Wieczerzak	100
(Kuwait) Meshal Sheaibi	000
(Burkina Faso) Hermann Monne	000
(Netherlands) Neal van de Kamer	100
(South Korea) Hogn Suk-Woong	000
(France) Loïc Pietri	012
(United Arab Emirates) Sergiu Toma	100
(Serbia) Aleksej Nefedov	000
(Lebanon) Nassif Elias	100
(Guinea) Abdoulaye Millimono	000
(Argentina) Ivan Duarte	000
(Hungary) László Csoknyai	013
(Russia) Ivan Vorobev	100
(Iraq) Hussein Al-Aameri	000

Quarterfinals
(Brazil) Victor Penalber	100
(Germany) Alexander Wieczerzak	000
(Netherlands) Neal van de Kamer	000
(France) Loïc Pietri	010
(United Arab Emirates) Sergiu Toma	010
(Lebanon) Nassif Elias	000
(Hungary) László Csoknyai	000
(Russia) Ivan Vorobev	010

Semifinals
(Brazil) Victor Penalber	000
(France) Loïc Pietri	100
(United Arab Emirates) Sergiu Toma	000
(Russia) Ivan Vorobev	010

Final
(France) Loïc Pietri	010
(Russia) Ivan Vorobev	000

=== Pool B ===
First round fights

	Score	
Saeid Moradi (Iran)	000–002	(Cuba) Jorge Martínez
Eoin Coughlan (Australia)	000–101	(United States) Jonathan Fernandez

Second Round
(Japan) Keita Nagashima	000
(Slovenia) Jesenko Četić	000
(Senegal) Baye Diawara	001
(Colombia) Felipe Pineda	010
(Ecuador) Hector Cisneros	000
(Austria) Marcel Ott	101
(Croatia) Tomislav Marijanović	100
(Cuba) Jorge Martínez	000
(Georgia (country)) Levan Tsiklauri	100
(Czech Republic) Jaromír Musil	000
(Mongolia) Otgonbaataryn Uuganbaatar	000
(China) Zhang Wentao	000
(United States) Jonathan Fernandez	100
(Angola) Angelo Antonio	000
(Central African Republic) Hardi Malot	000
(New Zealand) Ivica Pavlinic	101

Quarterfinals
(Slovenia) Jesenko Četić	100
(Colombia) Felipe Pineda	000
(Austria) Marcel Ott	100
(Croatia) Tomislav Marijanović	000
(Georgia (country)) Levan Tsiklauri	001
(Mongolia) Otgonbaataryn Uuganbaatar	002
(United States) Jonathan Fernandez	000
(New Zealand) Ivica Pavlinic	100

Semifinals
(Slovenia) Jesenko Četić	000
(Austria) Marcel Ott	110
(Mongolia) Otgonbaataryn Uuganbaatar	100
(New Zealand) Ivica Pavlinic	000

Final
(Austria) Marcel Ott	000
(Mongolia) Otgonbaataryn Uuganbaatar	100

=== Pool C ===
First round fights

	Score	
Aliaksandr Stsiashenka (Belarus)	000–000	(Latvia) Konstantīns Ovčiņņikovs
Safouane Attaf (Morocco)	100–000	(Seychelles) Leslie Philoe

Second Round
(Georgia (country)) Avtandili Tchrikishvili	100
(Belarus) Aliaksandr Stsiashenka	000
(Argentina) Emmanuel Lucenti	101
(Uruguay) Alain Aprahamian	000
(Angola) Eliseu Holo	000
(Iran) Amir Ghaseminejad	100
(Italy) Massimiliano Carollo	012
(El Salvador) Juan Diego Turcios	100
(Canada) Antoine Valois-Fortier	010
(Morocco) Safouane Attaf	000
(New Zealand) Mark Brewer	000
(France) Alain Schmitt	100
(Germany) Sven Maresch	100
(Mozambique) Leopoldo Tanque	000
(Hungary) Szabolcs Krizsán	000
(United States) Travis Stevens	000

Quarterfinals
(Georgia (country)) Avtandili Tchrikishvili	100
(Argentina) Emmanuel Lucenti	000
(Iran) Amir Ghaseminejad	100
(El Salvador) Juan Diego Turcios	000
(Canada) Antoine Valois-Fortier	000
(France) Alain Schmitt	001
(Germany) Sven Maresch	000
(United States) Travis Stevens	000

Semifinals
(Georgia (country)) Avtandili Tchrikishvili	100
(Iran) Amir Ghaseminejad	000
(France) Alain Schmitt	000
(Germany) Sven Maresch	000

Final
(Georgia (country)) Avtandili Tchrikishvili	100
(France) Alain Schmitt	000

=== Pool D ===
First round fights

	Score	
Carlos Luz (Portugal)	110–000	(Nepal) Deepak Shrestha
Robin Pacek (Sweden)	101–011	(Ukraine) Vitalii Dudchyk
Joachim Bottieau (Belgium)	000–000	(United Arab Emirates) Vadim Bocan

Second Round
(Philippines) Kodo Nakano	000
(Tajikistan) Farhod Rahimov	100
(Czech Republic) Jaromír Ježek	113
(The Bahamas) Willard McKenzie	000
(Haiti) Jackly Jean Baptiste	000
(Portugal) Carlos Luz	100
(Uzbekistan) Yakhyo Imamov	000
(Sweden) Robin Pacek	101
(Iceland) Sveinbjorn Iura	000
(Kazakhstan) Dauletkhan Zhakypov	100
(Spain) Francisco Javier Madera	100
(Venezuela) Arturo Zapata	000
(Belgium) Joachim Bottieau	000
(Colombia) Derian Castro	000

Quarterfinals
(Russia) Ivan Nifontov	100
(Tajikistan) Farhod Rahimov	000
(Czech Republic) Jaromír Ježek	000
(Portugal) Carlos Luz	000
(Sweden) Robin Pacek	010
(Kazakhstan) Dauletkhan Zhakypov	000
(Spain) Francisco Javier Madera	000
(Belgium) Joachim Bottieau	010

Semifinals
(Russia) Ivan Nifontov	100
(Portugal) Carlos Luz	000
(Sweden) Robin Pacek	000
(Belgium) Joachim Bottieau	101

Final
(Russia) Ivan Nifontov	010
(Belgium) Joachim Bottieau	000

=== Finals ===
Semi-finals
(France) Loïc Pietri	002
(Mongolia) Otgonbaataryn Uuganbaatar	000
(Georgia (country)) Avtandili Tchrikishvili	101
(Russia) Ivan Nifontov	000

Final
(France) Loïc Pietri	010
(Georgia (country)) Avtandili Tchrikishvili	001

=== Repechage ===
Repechage		Third place
(Russia) Ivan Vorobev	100
(Austria) Marcel Ott	000	(Russia) Ivan Vorobev	100
		(Russia) Ivan Nifontov	000

Repechage		Third place
(France) Alain Schmitt	000
(Belgium) Joachim Bottieau	000	(France) Alain Schmitt	010
		(Mongolia) Uuganbaatar Otgonbaatar	000
