= 2016 European Judo Championships – Men's 81 kg =

Judo Men's 81 kg at the 2016 European Judo Championships
- Venue: TatNeft Arena
- Location: Kazan, Russia
- Date: 22 April
- Competitors: 37 from 29 nations

Medalists
gold medal	Khasan Khalmurzaev (1st title)	Russia
silver medal	Avtandili Tchrikishvili	Georgia
bronze medal	Ivaylo Ivanov	Bulgaria
bronze medal	Robin Pacek	Sweden

Competition at external databases
- Links: IJF • JudoInside

The men's 81 kg competition at the 2016 European Judo Championships was held on 22 April at the TatNeft Arena, in Kazan, Russia.

== Results ==
=== Finals ===
Semi-finals
Avtandili Tchrikishvili (GEO)	10
Robin Pacek (SWE)	00
Khasan Khalmurzaev (RUS)	00
Ivaylo Ivanov (BUL)	00

Final
Avtandili Tchrikishvili (GEO)	00
Khasan Khalmurzaev (RUS)	01

=== Repechage ===
Repechage
Valeriu Duminică (MDA)	00
Jaromír Musil (CZE)	00

Third place
Valeriu Duminică (MDA)	00
Ivaylo Ivanov (BUL)	00

Repechage
Joachim Bottieau (BEL)	00
Frank de Wit (NED)	00

Third place
Frank de Wit (NED)	00
Robin Pacek (SWE)	10

=== Pool A ===
First round
Konstantīns Ovčiņņikovs (LAT)	00
Valeriu Duminică (MDA)	00

Round of 32
Avtandili Tchrikishvili (GEO)	10
Marcel Ott (AUT)	00
Emirhan Yücel (TUR)	01
Andranik Chaparyan (ARM)	00
Alexander Wieczerzak (GER)	00
Srđan Mrvaljević (MNE)	00
Adrián Nacimiento Lorenzo (ESP)	00
Valeriu Duminică (MDA)	00

Round of 16
Avtandili Tchrikishvili (GEO)	10
Emirhan Yücel (TUR)	00
Srđan Mrvaljević (MNE)	00
Valeriu Duminică (MDA)	01

Quarterfinals
Avtandili Tchrikishvili (GEO)	10
Valeriu Duminică (MDA)	00

=== Pool B ===
First round
Aliaksandr Stsiashenka (BLR)	00
Matúš Milichovský (SVK)	00

Round of 32
Roman Moustopoulos (GRE)	00
Łukasz Błach (POL)	10
Jaromír Musil (CZE)	10
Matúš Milichovský (SVK)	00
Sven Maresch (GER)	00
Diogo Lima (POR)	00
Robin Pacek (SWE)	10
Szabolcs Krizsán (HUN)	00

Round of 16
Łukasz Błach (POL)	01
Jaromír Musil (CZE)	11
Sven Maresch (GER)	00
Robin Pacek (SWE)	01

Quarterfinals
Jaromír Musil (CZE)	00
Robin Pacek (SWE)	10

=== Pool C ===
First round
Alexios Ntanatsidis (GRE)	10
Rafael Davtyan (ARM)	00

Round of 32
Khasan Khalmurzaev (RUS)	10
Asaf Chen (ISR)	00
Sveinbjörn Iura (ISL)	00
Jakub Kubieniec (POL)	01
Joachim Bottieau (BEL)	00
Alexios Ntanatsidis (GRE)	00
Abdulhagg Rasullu (AZE)	00
Alain Schmitt (FRA)	00

Round of 16
Khasan Khalmurzaev (RUS)	10
Jakub Kubieniec (POL)	00
Joachim Bottieau (BEL)	10
Abdulhagg Rasullu (AZE)	00

Quarterfinals
Khasan Khalmurzaev (RUS)	10
Joachim Bottieau (BEL)	00

=== Pool D ===
First round
Nemanja Majdov (SRB)	00
Ivan Petr (CZE)	00
Antonio Ciano (ITA)	00
Owen Livesey (GBR)	10

Round of 32
Ivaylo Ivanov (BUL)	10
Nicon Zaboroșciuc (MDA)	00
Nemanja Majdov (SRB)	00
Carlos Luz (POR)	11
László Csoknyai (HUN)	00
Owen Livesey (GBR)	10
Cristian Bodirlau (ROU)	00
Frank de Wit (NED)	10

Round of 16
Ivaylo Ivanov (BUL)	00
Carlos Luz (POR)	00
Owen Livesey (GBR)	00
Frank de Wit (NED)	10

Quarterfinals
Ivaylo Ivanov (BUL)	10
Frank de Wit (NED)	00
