= Judo at the 2015 European Games – Men's 81 kg =

Judo competition

Judo Men's 81 kg at the 2015 European Games
- Venue: Heydar Aliyev Arena
- Location: Baku, Azerbaijan
- Date: 26 June
- Competitors: 39 from 30 nations

Medalists
gold medal	Avtandil Tchrikishvili (3rd title)	Georgia
silver medal	Ivan Nifontov	Russia
bronze medal	Alexander Wieczerzak	Germany
bronze medal	Loïc Pietri	France

Competition at external databases
- Links: IJF • JudoInside

The men's 81 kg judo event at the 2015 European Games in Baku was held on 26 June at the Heydar Aliyev Arena.

== Results ==
=== Finals ===
Semi-finals
Avtandili Tchrikishvili (GEO)	100
Sven Maresch (GER)	000
Alexander Wieczerzak (GER)	000
Ivan Nifontov (RUS)	001

Final
Avtandili Tchrikishvili (GEO)	010
Ivan Nifontov (RUS)	010

=== Repechage ===
Repechage
Aliaksandr Stsiashenka (BLR)	001
Alan Khubetsov (RUS)	000

Third place
Aliaksandr Stsiashenka (BLR)	000
Alexander Wieczerzak (GER)	000

Repechage
Loïc Pietri (FRA)	110
Vitalii Dudchyk (UKR)	000

Third place
Loïc Pietri (FRA)	100
Sven Maresch (GER)	000

=== Pool A ===
First round
Joachim Bottieau (BEL)	000
Ivaylo Ivanov (BUL)	100

Round of 32
Avtandili Tchrikishvili (GEO)	100
Ivaylo Ivanov (BUL)	000
Jevgeni Salejev (EST)	010
Konstantīns Ovčiņņikovs (LAT)	000
Roman Moustopoulos (GRE)	000
Asaf Chen (ISR)	100
Aliaksandr Stsiashenka (BLR)	001
Diogo Lima (POR)	001

Round of 16
Avtandili Tchrikishvili (GEO)	100
Jevgeni Salejev (EST)	000
Asaf Chen (ISR)	000
Aliaksandr Stsiashenka (BLR)	002

Quarterfinals
Avtandili Tchrikishvili (GEO)	100
Aliaksandr Stsiashenka (BLR)	000

=== Pool B ===
First round
Gašper Jerman (SLO)	000
Jaromír Musil (CZE)	000
Jakub Kubieniec (POL)	000
Cristian Bodîrlău (ROU)	000

Round of 32
Alan Khubetsov (RUS)	010
Nemanja Majdov (SRB)	000
László Csoknyai (HUN)	100
Jaromír Musil (CZE)	000
Sven Maresch (GER)	000
Cristian Bodîrlău (ROU)	000
Antti Virta (FIN)	000
Antonio Ciano (ITA)	100

Round of 16
Alan Khubetsov (RUS)	100
László Csoknyai (HUN)	000
Sven Maresch (GER)	100
Antonio Ciano (ITA)	000

Quarterfinals
Alan Khubetsov (RUS)	000
Sven Maresch (GER)	000

=== Pool C ===
First round
Jesenko Četić (SLO)	000
Robin Pacek (SWE)	010
Alexander Wieczerzak (GER)	100
Sveinbjörn Iura (ISL)	001

Round of 32
Loïc Pietri (FRA)	000
Robin Pacek (SWE)	000
Valeriu Duminică (MDA)	000
Łukasz Błach (POL)	011
Ushangi Margiani (GEO)	101
Matúš Milichovský (SVK)	000
Alexander Wieczerzak (GER)	100
Tomislav Marijanović (CRO)	000

Round of 16
Loïc Pietri (FRA)	010
Łukasz Błach (POL)	000
Ushangi Margiani (GEO)	000
Alexander Wieczerzak (GER)	100

Quarterfinals
Loïc Pietri (FRA)	000
Alexander Wieczerzak (GER)	010

=== Pool D ===
First round
Owen Livesey (GBR)	100
Srđan Mrvaljević (MNE)	000
Kristjan Tõniste (EST)	001
Adrián Nacimiento (ESP)	101

Round of 32
Ivan Nifontov (RUS)	100
Marcel Ott (AUT)	000
Carlos Luz (POR)	011
Owen Livesey (GBR)	000
Szabolcs Krizsán (HUN)	000
Vitalii Dudchyk (UKR)	100
Adrián Nacimiento (ESP)	100
Alexios Ntanatsidis (GRE)	000

Round of 16
Ivan Nifontov (RUS)	000
Carlos Luz (POR)	000
Vitalii Dudchyk (UKR)	010
Adrián Nacimiento (ESP)	000

Quarterfinals
Ivan Nifontov (RUS)	101
Vitalii Dudchyk (UKR)	000
