= Takanori Nagase =

Japanese judoka (born 1993)

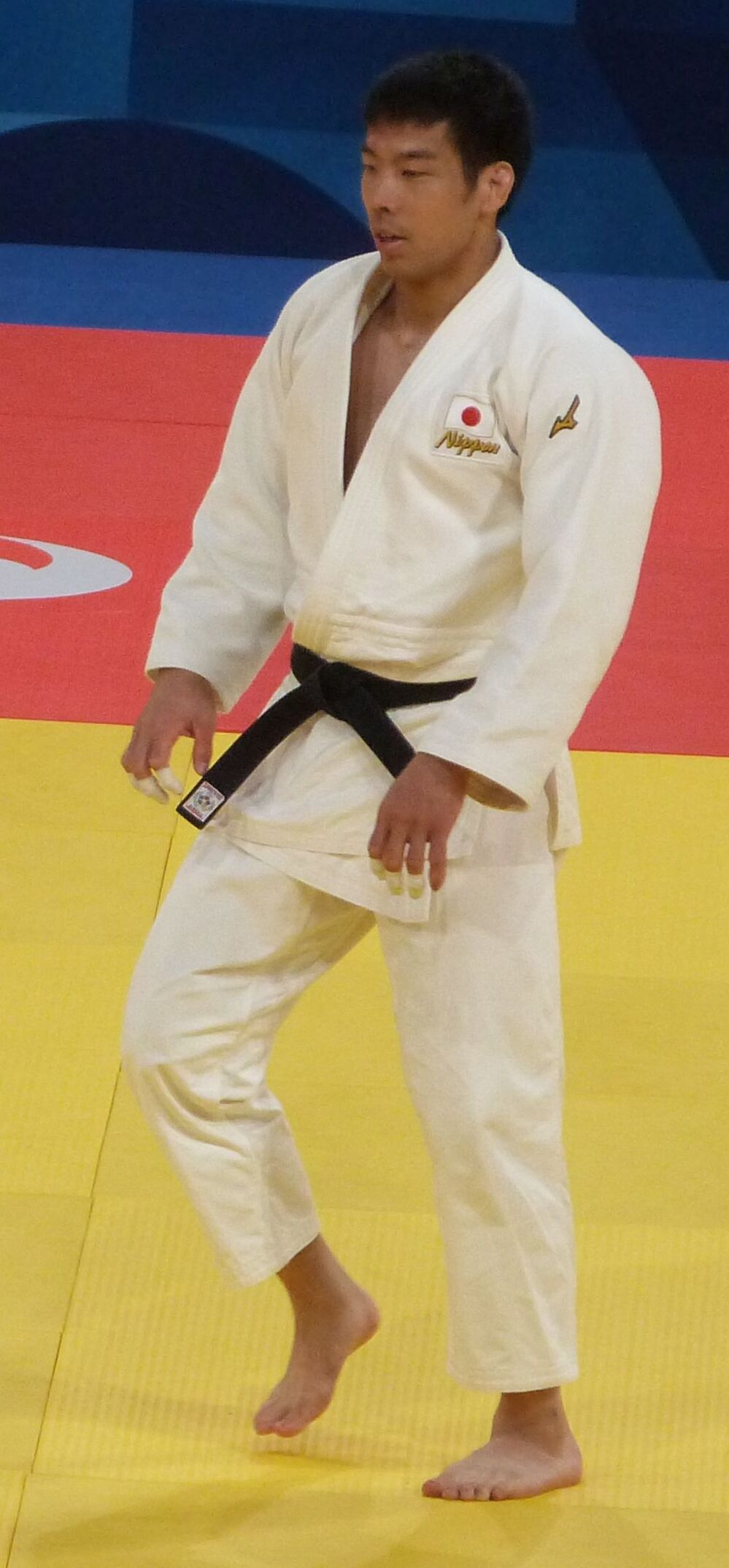
- Nagase in 2024

Personal information
- Native name: 永瀬 貴規
- Born: 14 October 1993 (age 33) Nagasaki, Japan
- Home town: Ibaraki, Japan
- Education: University of Tsukuba
- Occupation: Judoka
- Height: 181 cm (5 ft 11 in)

Sport
- Country: Japan
- Sport: Judo
- Weight class: ‍–‍81 kg
- Rank: 5th dan black belt
- Club: Asahi Kasei
- Team: All Japan National Team
- Coached by: Yusuke Kanamaru; Konegawa Minoru; Kosei Inoue

Achievements and titles
- Olympic Games: (gold) (2020, 2024)
- World Champ.: (gold) (2015)
Medal record
Men's judo
Representing Japan
Olympic Games
Gold medal – first place	2020 Tokyo	‍–‍81 kg
Gold medal – first place	2024 Paris	‍–‍81 kg
Silver medal – second place	2020 Tokyo	Mixed team
Silver medal – second place	2024 Paris	Mixed team
Bronze medal – third place	2016 Rio de Janeiro	‍–‍81 kg
World Championships
Gold medal – first place	2015 Astana	‍–‍81 kg
Bronze medal – third place	2022 Tashkent	‍–‍81 kg
Bronze medal – third place	2023 Doha	‍–‍81 kg
World Masters
Gold medal – first place	2015 Rabat	‍–‍81 kg
Bronze medal – third place	2023 Budapest	‍–‍81 kg
IJF Grand Slam
Gold medal – first place	2013 Tokyo	‍–‍81 kg
Gold medal – first place	2014 Tokyo	‍–‍81 kg
Gold medal – first place	2016 Baku	‍–‍81 kg
Gold medal – first place	2016 Tokyo	‍–‍81 kg
Gold medal – first place	2019 Brasilia	‍–‍81 kg
Gold medal – first place	2019 Osaka	‍–‍81 kg
Gold medal – first place	2024 Antalya	‍–‍81 kg
Silver medal – second place	2019 Ekaterinburg	‍–‍81 kg
Silver medal – second place	2022 Tokyo	‍–‍81 kg
Silver medal – second place	2025 Astana	‍–‍81 kg
Bronze medal – third place	2014 Paris	‍–‍81 kg
Bronze medal – third place	2015 Tokyo	‍–‍81 kg
Bronze medal – third place	2018 Osaka	‍–‍81 kg
Bronze medal – third place	2021 Tashkent	‍–‍81 kg
Bronze medal – third place	2022 Ulaanbaatar	‍–‍81 kg
Bronze medal – third place	2024 Tashkent	‍–‍81 kg
IJF Grand Prix
Gold medal – first place	2019 Montreal	‍–‍81 kg
Gold medal – first place	2019 Zagreb	‍–‍81 kg
Asian Junior Championships
Gold medal – first place	2012 Taipei	‍–‍81 kg
Summer Universiade
Gold medal – first place	2013 Kazan	‍–‍81 kg
Gold medal – first place	2013 Kazan	Men's team

Profile at external databases
- IJF: 11900
- JudoInside.com: 79316
- Updated on 11 May 2025

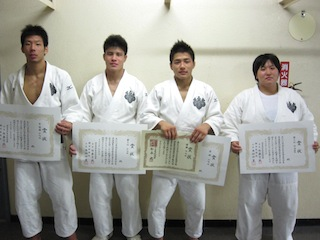
Nagase (left), representing the University of Tsukuba, after winning the half-middleweight gold at 2013 All Japan University Championships. His former teammate, An Chang-rim (second from the right), also won the lightweight title for their university.

Takanori Nagase (Japanese: 永瀬貴規; born 14 October 1993) is a Japanese judoka.

Nagase is a double Olympic champion at under 81 kg, winning gold in both 2020 (2021) and 2024. He won bronze in 2016. His other achievements include the Universiade in Kazan in 2013, the Grand Slam in Tokyo in 2013 and 2014, the All Japan Championships, the IJF Masters in Rabat and the World Judo Championships in 2015.

Nagase's favourite technique is uchi mata and is known for his newaza. He is the first and only Japanese judoka to become world champion in the -81 kg weight class. Nagase won the gold medal in the Men's 81 kg event at the 2020 Summer Olympics held in Tokyo, Japan and at the 2024 Summer Olympics held in Paris, France.

== Early life ==
Nagase started judo at the age of 6. As a child, he competed nationally in the under 40 kg class, and had lost to future teammate Naohisa Takato, finishing fifth place.

In junior high and high school he attended Nagasaki Nihon University, where he also competed nationally. He won various awards for his alma mater across weight classes. Nagase still frequently trains at his alma mater, and teaches young judokas.

Nagase attended the University of Tsukuba. He was the half-middleweight champion at the 2013 All Japan University Championships. He had also taught at the Kodokan as an instructor to children.

Nagase's grand-uncle is Katsushi Hirao, a silver medalist at the 1969 World Championships.

After graduating from Tsukuba, Nagase signed with Asahi Kasei.

== Career ==
=== Beginnings and first international medals: 2013 ===
==== 2013 Universiade ====
Nagase won the half-middleweight gold in Kazan, winning three out of his four fights by ippon.

In the team competition, Japan won all their fights 5-0 en route to the final. Nagase went against Lee Seungsoo, who he later competed against in the senior tournaments, and lost by ippon. However, Japan still won 3–2, and secured gold.

==== 2013 European Open Tbilisi ====
Nagase's first senior international competition was at the European Open in Tbilisi, Georgia. He was fairly successful, winning his first three fights by ippon. He lost to Tural Safguliyev, when the Azerbaijani threw him for ippon in the final, therefore making Nagase settle for silver.

==== 2013 Grand Slam Tokyo ====
Nagase's first Grand Slam competition was at home ground in Tokyo. He had experienced opponents in the form of European champion Avtandil Tchrikishvili in the quarter-final and reigning world champion Loïc Pietri in the final. Nagase threw Pietri for ippon using ashi guruma to win the gold medal.

=== Transition into Japan national team: 2014 ===
==== 2014 Grand Slam Paris ====
Nagase participated in his second Grand Slam in Paris. He again faced Tchrikishvili in the quarter-final, and lost by shido. He won the repechage against Germany's Sven Maresch, and won by shido. He narrowly won the bronze against Canada's Antoine Valois-Fortier, with just a yuko between them.

==== 2014 All Japan Championships ====
Nagase won his first senior national title at the All Japan Championships in Fukuoka. He beat Keita Nagashima in the final to represent Japan at the 2014 World Championships in the half-middleweight category, and claim gold.

Nagase also participated in the prestigious Open category in Tokyo, where he surprised heavyweight opponents by beating Kazuhiko Takahashi, who outweighs him by 40 kg, in the quarter-final. He lost to eventual champion Takeshi Ojitani, who beat him by ippon with osaekomi-waza. He ended up winning bronze.

==== 2014 World Championships ====
Nagase represented Japan in his first world championships in Chelyabinsk. He was playing ippon judo in his first three fights, however again lost against eventual world champion Tchrikishvili in the quarter-final by shido. He narrowly won the repechage against Lebanon's Nacif Elias by shido, but was defeated by Pietri in a revenge match by waza-ari, leaving Nagase to finish fifth place.

In the team competition, Nagase faced Tchrikishvili for the second time in the tournament during the semi-final. As Georgia were the defending world champions and Tchrikishvili was the reigning world champion, odds were against Nagase, even though Japan were 2–0 up. However, he managed to defeat Tchrikishvili in golden score with an uchi mata for waza-ari.

Japan was against home favourites Russia in the team final. With Russia President Vladimir Putin watching and the home crowd cheering, the Russians capitalized on their advantage and defeated the first two Japanese judokas. Nagase managed to overcome the pressure and defeat Murat Khabachirov with an ouchi gari for ippon, salvaging Japan's chances. Japan ended up winning 3–2, and the final was cemented as one of the best in history.

==== 2014 Grand Slam Tokyo ====
Nagase successfully defended his Grand Slam title for the second year running. On the course to the final, Nagase was against double world and Olympic champion Kim Jae-bum in the quarter-final, and defeated him by waza-ari. In the semi-final, Nagase faced against rival Tchrikishvili, and won by ippon. Nagase won the gold medal after defeating Sergiu Toma in golden score.

=== Rise to prominence and World title: 2015 ===
"Somehow we were able to win. It was good to repay last year's loss. I think that it is a real game from here on; I think that we want to further devote [our effort] to win in next year's Olympic Games. Since there is also a team competition I will do my best again. Really, thank you for your support." - Nagase's comment on his junior's blog post, thanking his alma mater

==== 2015 Grand Prix Dusseldorf ====
Nagase made a shock exit in the second round of the Grand Prix in Düsseldorf, losing to Belarus' Aliaksandr Stsiashenka by ippon and waza-ari.

==== 2015 All Japan Championships ====
Nagase again won the gold in the half-middleweight category at the national championships, beating Nagashima for the second time.

==== 2015 Masters Rabat ====
Nagase claimed his first Masters title in Rabat, defeating Toma again by osaekomi-waza for ippon.

==== 2015 World Judo Championships ====
Nagase played ippon judo in his first two fights, however narrowly won by shido against Egypt's Mohamed Abdelaal. He then faced Korea's Lee Seung-soo in the quarter-final, where he used kouchi gari to throw Lee for waza-ari, then followed up with kuzure kesa gatame for ippon. He once again met Tchrikishvili, in the semi-final, and scraped through to the final with a yuko. He defeated Pietri in the final with a sankaku kami shiho for ippon, making newaza one of Nagase's most effective techniques. He became Japan's first half-middleweight world champion. He was one of Japan's three male individual gold medalists in the tournament.

In the team competition, Japan faced South Korea in the final. Nagase defeated Lee again, and Japan won the gold with a score of 3–2.

==== 2015 Grand Slam Tokyo ====
Nagase looked to defend his Grand Slam title in Tokyo thrice, and looked to be on form, defeating all his opponents in his first three fights by ippon.

However, Nagase was caught in controversy in the quarter-final, where he was disqualified for committing hansoku make. The referee appeared to be pressured by Lee's coach Song Dae-nam, who was avidly shouting for disqualification. Nagase had been knocked in the mouth during the fight, and was bleeding, but did not seek medical attention until after the final decision had been called. Japan's head coach Kōsei Inoue later on explained that Nagase was holding the judogi, and not the leg. The International Judo Federation later apologized for the refereeing mistake. After the bout a journalist approached Nagase to inform him that the decision was incorrect. Nagase responded with gratitude, and said, "It's lucky it's not the Olympics."

Nagese went on to win bronze against Greece's Roman Moustopoulos, scoring an ippon, a waza-ari and two yukos.

=== Successful qualification for the Olympics: 2016-present ===
==== 2016 All Japan Championships ====
Nagase won his third consecutive Japanese national title in his first competition of 2016 at the All Japan Championships. He defeated Nagashima for the third time by waza-ari with an unorthodox ushiro goshi.

By winning the national title, and being the highest ranked Japanese in the half-middleweights, Nagase was chosen to represent Japan in his division at the 2016 Olympics.

==== 2016 Grand Slam Baku ====
Nagase returned to international competition after a five-month absence at the Grand Slam in Baku. He played his first bout against local Abdulhagg Rasullu, and won by scoring a waza-ari with ouchi gari then scoring another waza-ari for ippon using one of his favourite ground techniques, sankaku gatame.

Nagase played against Portugal's Carlos Luz in the quarter-final. Nagase first scored a waza-ari with an ouchi gari to uchi mata combination. He then sealed the bout with another uchi mata for ippon.

In the semi-final, Nagase, the senior half-middleweight World Champion, faced his toughest opponent of the competition, junior half-middleweight World Champion, Dutchman Frank de Wit. De Wit managed to catch the Japanese off guard, scoring a waza-ari a minute and a half into the fight. The IJF commentators said that de Wit mockingly remarked, "Takanori who?" after scoring against Nagase. Nagase then scored a waza-ari with a kosoto gake with only ten seconds left. The bout went into golden score as both were level with a shido each. The bout was decided in favour of Nagase.

Nagase faced Bulgaria's Ivaylo Ivanov in the final, and defeated him in 40 seconds by ippon with kosoto gari.

==== 2016 Olympic Games ====
"I practised to win the gold medal in the Olympics but I lost in the quarterfinal. After that, everyone said to me to change my feelings. Because of their support I could win the bronze medal. The first thing I learned was that I did not have enough strength to win. To win on this big stage is really difficult."

— Nagase on his Olympic bronze medal, one of Japan's 12 medals from judo

==== 2016 Grand Slam Tokyo ====
Nagase returned to action at home in Tokyo, his first tournament after the Olympic Games. He was up against Serbia's Stefan Majdov in Round 2. Nagase tried to turn Majdov transitioning to newaza, but was unsuccessful. Nagase then attempted a low ashi waza, however the referees ruled no score. He then rolled Majdov over for newaza but was stopped by the referee, calling ippon.

In the quarter-final he faced Korean Hong Sukwong. Nagase first attacked with an uchi mata, but Hong was able to block it to give no score. Nagase then pulled Hong to the ground, and pinned him with yoko shiho gatame for ippon. Nagase then endured a tough fight against countryman Yuki Haruyama. Haruyama attacked first with a newaza attempt, but was unable to roll Nagase to his front. Nagase then followed with multiple uchi mata attempts to no avail. Haruyama's drop seoi nage attempts were also blocked by Nagase, however the former had picked up two shidos sending Nagase through to the final.

Nagase was against Germany's Dominic Ressel, and again went to ground for his first attack. Upon turning Ressel over, they went outside the tatami and was called to restart by the referee. After several tries on the ground, Nagase finally had a breakthrough with kouchi gaeshi for yuko which he connected to tate shiho gatame for ippon. He won his third title in Tokyo, despite having some blood on the side of his face.

== Competitive record ==
(as of June 2024)

Judo Record
Total	140
Wins	121
by Ippon	83
Losses	19
by Ippon	9

== Palmares ==
2013
(gold) Grand Slam -81 kg, Tokyo
(silver) European Open -81kg, Tbilisi
(gold) Universiade -81kg, Kazan
2014
(gold) Grand Slam -81 kg, Tokyo
(bronze) Grand Slam -81 kg, Paris
(gold) All Japan Judo Championships -81 kg, Fukuoka
(bronze) All Japan Judo Championships OpenM, Fukuoka
2015
(gold) World Championships -81 kg, Astana
(gold) IJF World Masters -81 kg, Rabat
(gold) All Japan Judo Championships -81 kg, Fukuoka
(bronze) Grand Slam -81kg, Tokyo
2016
(gold) All Japan Judo Championships -81kg, Fukuoka
(gold) Grand Slam -81kg, Baku
(bronze) Olympic Games -81 kg, Rio de Janeiro
(gold) Grand Slam -81kg, Tokyo
2021
(gold) Olympic Games -81 kg, Tokyo
2024
(gold) Olympic Games -81 kg, Paris
