= Avtandili Tchrikishvili =

Georgian judoka (born 1991)

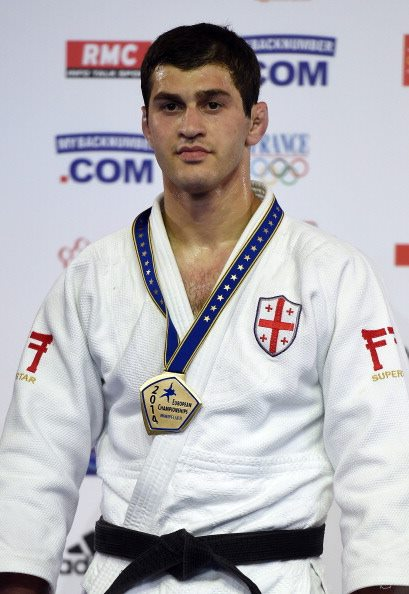
- Tchrickishvili after winning a gold medal

Personal information
- Native name: ავთანდილ ჭრიკიშვილი
- Nationality: Georgian
- Born: 18 March 1991 (age 35) Norio, Gardabani, Georgian SSR, Soviet Union
- Home town: Tbilisi, Georgia
- Occupation: Judoka
- Years active: 2008–present
- Height: 1.82 m (6 ft 0 in)

Sport
- Country: Georgia
- Sport: Judo
- Weight class: –81 kg
- Rank: 3rd dan black belt
- Coached by: Guram Modebadze

Achievements and titles
- Olympic Games: 5th (2016)
- World Champ.: (2014)
- European Champ.: (gold) (2013, 2014, 2015)
Medal record
Men's judo
Representing Georgia
World Championships
| Gold medal – first place | 2013 Rio de Janeiro | Men's team |
| Gold medal – first place | 2014 Chelyabinsk | ‍–‍81 kg |
| Silver medal – second place | 2013 Rio de Janeiro | ‍–‍81 kg |
| Bronze medal – third place | 2014 Chelyabinsk | Men's team |
| Bronze medal – third place | 2015 Chelyabinsk | Men's team |
European Games
| Gold medal – first place | 2015 Baku | ‍–‍81 kg |
| Silver medal – second place | 2015 Baku | Men's team |
European Championships
| Gold medal – first place | 2012 Chelyanbinsk | Men's team |
| Gold medal – first place | 2013 Budapest | ‍–‍81 kg |
| Gold medal – first place | 2013 Budapest | Men's team |
| Gold medal – first place | 2014 Montpellier | ‍–‍81 kg |
| Gold medal – first place | 2014 Montpellier | Men's team |
| Gold medal – first place | 2016 Kazan | Men's team |
| Silver medal – second place | 2016 Kazan | ‍–‍81 kg |
| Bronze medal – third place | 2011 Istanbul | Men's team |
World Masters
| Bronze medal – third place | 2013 Tyumen | ‍–‍81 kg |
| Bronze medal – third place | 2015 Rabat | ‍–‍81 kg |
IJF Grand Slam
| Gold medal – first place | 2014 Paris | ‍–‍81 kg |
| Gold medal – first place | 2015 Tokyo | ‍–‍81 kg |
| Gold medal – first place | 2016 Paris | ‍–‍81 kg |
| Silver medal – second place | 2013 Paris | ‍–‍81 kg |
| Bronze medal – third place | 2013 Tokyo | ‍–‍81 kg |
| Bronze medal – third place | 2014 Tokyo | ‍–‍81 kg |
| Bronze medal – third place | 2019 Abu Dhabi | ‍–‍90 kg |
IJF Grand Prix
| Gold medal – first place | 2013 Düsseldorf | ‍–‍81 kg |
| Gold medal – first place | 2014 Tbilisi | ‍–‍81 kg |
| Gold medal – first place | 2014 Havana | ‍–‍81 kg |
| Gold medal – first place | 2018 Zagreb | ‍–‍90 kg |
| Silver medal – second place | 2015 Düsseldorf | ‍–‍81 kg |
| Bronze medal – third place | 2019 Antalya | ‍–‍90 kg |
World Juniors Championships
| Gold medal – first place | 2010 Agadir | ‍–‍81 kg |
European Junior Championships
| Gold medal – first place | 2010 Samokov | ‍–‍81 kg |
| Bronze medal – third place | 2009 Yerevan | ‍–‍81 kg |

Profile at external databases
- IJF: 1709
- JudoInside.com: 53808
- Updated on 4 July 2023

Avtandili Tchrikishvili (Georgian: ავთანდილ ჭრიკიშვილი; born 18 March 1991) is a Georgian judoka who has been a former world champion. After Tchrikishvilli won the World Championships in 2014, the Ministry of Sport and Youth Affairs of Georgia named him the Best Georgian Sportsman of 2014. As of 6 June 2016, he was ranked No. 1 in the world.

== Olympiad ==
Avtandili Tchrikishvili competed in the men's 81 kg event at the 2012 Summer Olympics; after defeating Tomislav Marijanović in the second round, he was eliminated by Travis Stevens in the third round.

He competed for Georgia again at the 2016 Summer Olympics. He defeated Iván Felipe Silva of Cuba during the round of 32. He then defeated Juan Diego Turcios of El Salvador in the round of 16. He was defeated by the eventual silver medalist, Travis Stevens of the United States in the semifinals. He was defeated by Takanori Nagase of Japan in the bronze medal match. He was the flagbearer for Georgia during the 2016 Parade of Nations.

== Achievements ==
| Year | Tournament | Place | Weight class |
|---|---|---|---|
| 2016 | European Judo Championships | 2nd | Middleweight (−81 kg) |
| 2016 | Grand Slam Paris | 1st | Middleweight (−81 kg) |
| 2015 | Grand Slam Tokyo | 1st | Middleweight (−81 kg) |
| 2015 | European Judo Championships | 1st | Middleweight (−81 kg) |
| 2014 | World Judo Championships | 1st | Middleweight (−81 kg) |
| 2014 | European Judo Championships | 1st | Middleweight (−81 kg) |
| 2014 | Grand Slam Paris | 1st | Middleweight (−81 kg) |
| 2014 | ECCO Team Challenge | 1st | Middleweight (−81 kg) |
| 2013 | World Judo Championships | 2nd | Middleweight (−81 kg) |
| 2013 | European Judo Championships | 1st | Middleweight (−81 kg) |
| 2012 | Georgian Championships Tbilisi | 1st | Middleweight (−81 kg) |
| 2012 | European Championships for Clubs men Istanbul | 3rd | Middleweight (−81 kg) |
| 2012 | PJC World Cup Buenos Aires | 1st | Middleweight (−81 kg) |
| 2012 | European Team Championships Chelyabinsk | 1st | Middleweight (−81 kg) |
| 2012 | World Cup Tbilisi | 1st | Middleweight (−81 kg) |
| 2011 | IJF World Cup Apia | 1st | Middleweight (−81 kg) |
| 2011 | World Cup Bucharest | 1st | Middleweight (−81 kg) |
| 2011 | European Team Championships Istanbul | 3rd | Middleweight (−81 kg) |
| 2011 | World Cup Tbilisi | 1st | Middleweight (−81 kg) |
| 2010 | Georgian Championships Tbilisi | 3rd | Middleweight (−81 kg) |
| 2010 | World Junior Championships U20 Agadir | 1st | Middleweight (−81 kg) |
| 2010 | European U20 Championships Samokov | 1st | Middleweight (−81 kg) |
| 2010 | EJU European Cup Top Junior U20 Prague | 1st | Middleweight (−81 kg) |
| 2010 | Georgian U20 Championships Tbilisi | 1st | Middleweight (−81 kg) |
| 2010 | International Junior Tournament 'Attila Cup' Baku | 1st | Middleweight (−81 kg) |
| 2010 | European U20 Cup Mudania "Iliadis Cup" | 1st | Middleweight (−81 kg) |
| 2009 | European U20 Championships Yerevan | 1st | Middleweight (−81 kg) |
| 2009 | EJU Junior Tour U20 Izmir 'Cehat Sener' | 1st | Middleweight (−81 kg) |
| 2009 | EJU Top Junior Tour U20 Paks | 3rd | Middleweight (−90 kg) |
| 2009 | Georgian U20 Championships Tbilisi | 1st | Middleweight (−81 kg) |
| 2008 | EJU Top Junior Tour U20 Prague | 3rd | Middleweight (−81 kg) |

Olympic Games
| Preceded by Nino Salukvadze | Flagbearer for Georgia; Rio de Janeiro 2016 | Succeeded by Nino Salukvadze & Lasha Talakhadze |
