= Judo at the 2016 Summer Olympics – Men's 81 kg =

Judo competition

Men's 81 kg at the Games of the XXXI Olympiad
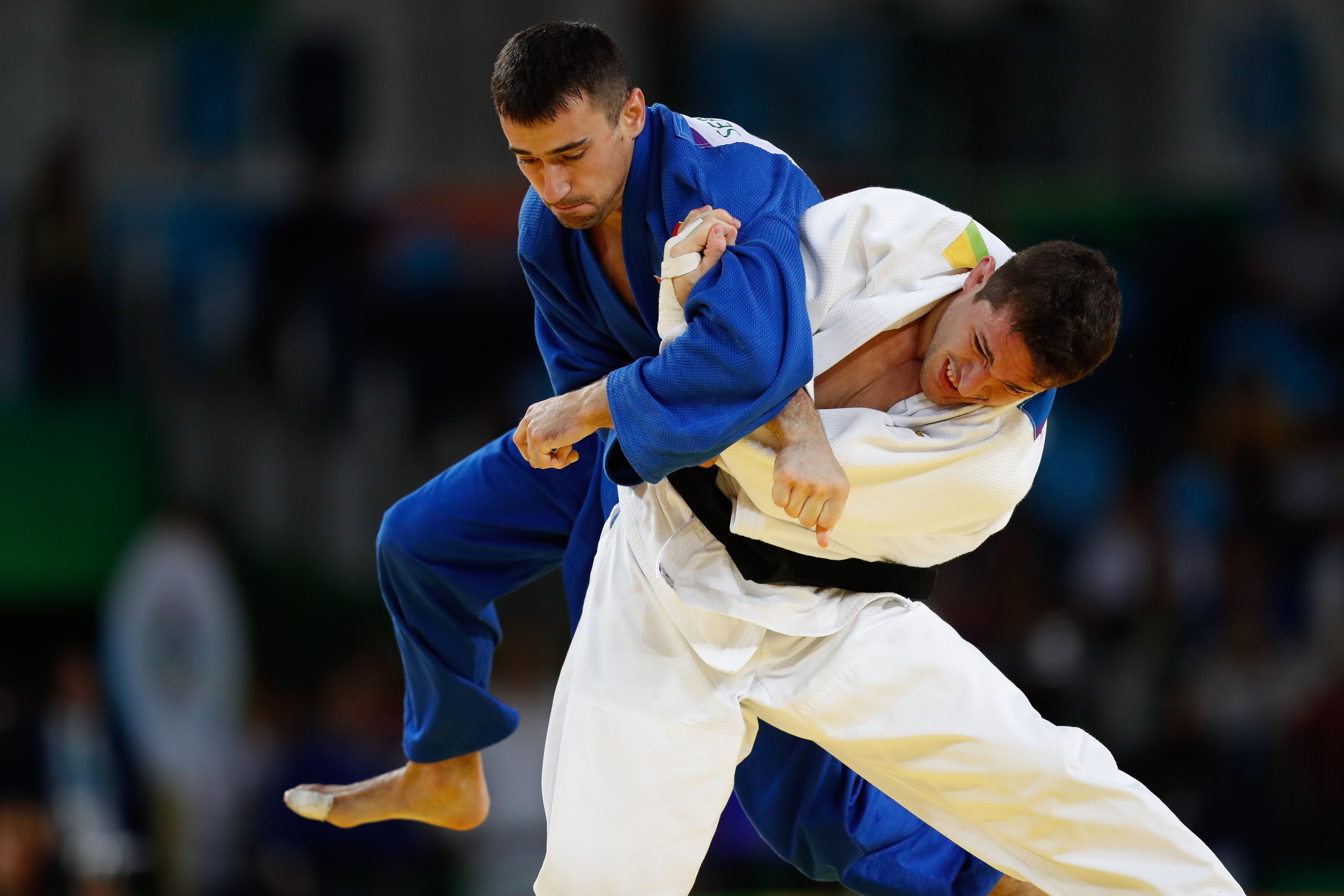
- Brazil's Victor Penalber faces the UAE's Sergiu Toma during Pool C's third round.
- Venue: Carioca Arena 2
- Date: 9 August 2016
- Competitors: 33 from 33 nations

Medalists
1st place, gold medalist(s)		Khasan Khalmurzaev	Russia
2nd place, silver medalist(s)		Travis Stevens	United States
3rd place, bronze medalist(s)		Sergiu Toma	United Arab Emirates
3rd place, bronze medalist(s)		Takanori Nagase	Japan

The men's 81 kg competition in judo at the 2016 Summer Olympics in Rio de Janeiro was held on 9 August at the Carioca Arena 2.

The gold and silver medals were determined by a single-elimination tournament, with the winner of the final taking gold and the loser receiving silver. Judo events awarded two bronze medals. Quarterfinal losers competed in a repechage match for the right to face a semifinal loser for a bronze medal (that is, the judokas defeated in quarterfinals A and B competed against each other, with the winner of that match facing the semifinal loser from the other half of the bracket).

The medals were presented by Henri, Grand Duke of Luxembourg, IOC member, and the gifts were presented by Mr. Naser Al Tamimi, General Treasurer of the International Judo Federation.

== Results ==
=== Finals ===
Semi-finals
Avtandil Tchrikishvili (GEO)	000
Travis Stevens (USA)	100
Sergiu Toma (UAE)	000
Khasan Khalmurzaev (RUS)	100

Final
Travis Stevens (USA)	000
Khasan Khalmurzaev (RUS)	100

=== Repechages ===
Repechage		Bronze medal
Matteo Marconcini (ITA)	100
Ivaylo Ivanov (BUL)	000	Matteo Marconcini (ITA)	000
		Sergiu Toma (UAE)	100

Repechage		Bronze medal
Takanori Nagase (JPN)	100
Antoine Valois-Fortier (CAN)	000	Takanori Nagase (JPN)	001
		Avtandil Tchrikishvili (GEO)	000

=== Pool A ===
First round
Matteo Marconcini (ITA)	100
Kodo Nakano (PHI)	000

Second round
Avtandil Tchrikishvili (GEO)	001
Iván Felipe Silva (CUB)	000
Juan Diego Turcios (ESA)	100
Roman Moustopoulos (GRE)	000
Joachim Bottieau (BEL)	000
Matteo Marconcini (ITA)	000
Valeriu Duminică (MDA)	002
Srđan Mrvaljević (MNE)	000

Third round
Avtandil Tchrikishvili (GEO)	000
Juan Diego Turcios (ESA)	000
Matteo Marconcini (ITA)	110
Valeriu Duminică (MDA)	010

Quarterfinals
Avtandil Tchrikishvili (GEO)	011
Matteo Marconcini (ITA)	000

=== Pool B ===
First round

Second round
Ivaylo Ivanov (BUL)	110
Frank de Wit (NED)	000
Eoin Coughlan (AUS)	000
Lee Seung-soo (KOR)	100
Travis Stevens (USA)	001
Robin Pacek (SWE)	000
Shakhzodbek Sabirov (UZB)	100
Josateki Naulu (FIJ)	001

Third round
Ivaylo Ivanov (BUL)	010
Lee Seung-soo (KOR)	000
Travis Stevens (USA)	101
Shakhzodbek Sabirov (UZB)	000

Quarterfinals
Ivaylo Ivanov (BUL)	000
Travis Stevens (USA)	100

=== Pool C ===
First round

Second round
Takanori Nagase (JPN)	001
László Csoknyai (HUN)	000
Paul Kibikai (GAB)	000
Hussein Ali (IRQ)	000
Victor Penalber (BRA)	100
Marlon Acácio (MOZ)	000
Sven Maresch (GER)	000
Sergiu Toma (UAE)	101

Third round
Takanori Nagase (JPN)	100
Paul Kibikai (GAB)	000
Victor Penalber (BRA)	001
Sergiu Toma (UAE)	101

Quarterfinals
Takanori Nagase (JPN)	000
Sergiu Toma (UAE)	001

=== Pool D ===
First round

Second round
Antoine Valois-Fortier (CAN)	001
Loïc Pietri (FRA)	000
Nacif Elias (LIB)	000
Emmanuel Lucenti (ARG)	100
Khasan Khalmurzaev (RUS)	000
Saeid Mollaei (IRI)	000
Otgonbaataryn Uuganbaatar (MGL)	000
Mohamed Abdelaal (EGY)	101

Third round
Antoine Valois-Fortier (CAN)	010
Emmanuel Lucenti (ARG)	010
Khasan Khalmurzaev (RUS)	010
Mohamed Abdelaal (EGY)	000

Quarterfinals
Antoine Valois-Fortier (CAN)	000
Khasan Khalmurzaev (RUS)	010
