= Judo at the 2012 Summer Olympics – Men's 81 kg =

Judo competition

Men's 81kg at the Games of the XXX Olympiad
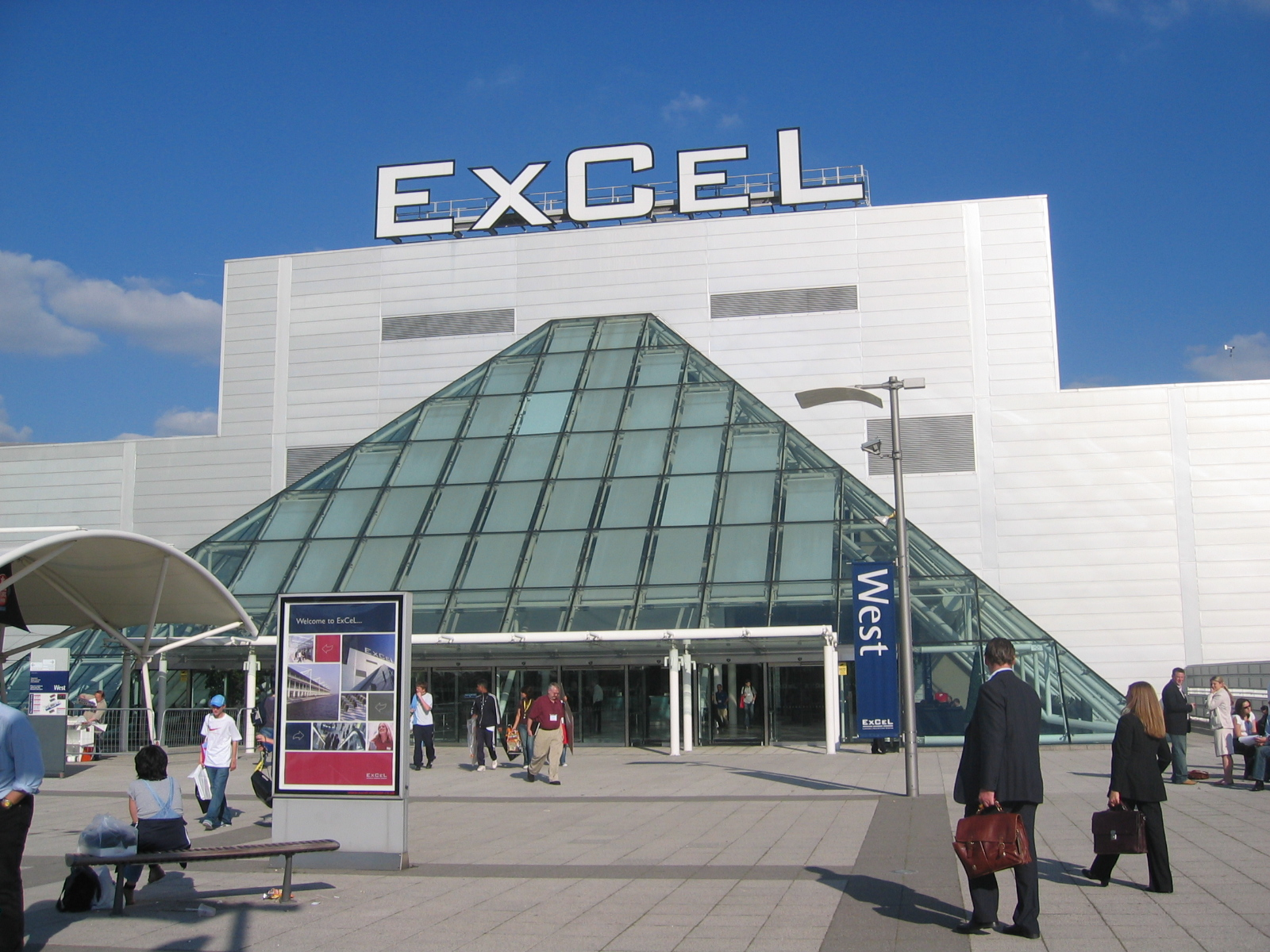
- ExCel Exhibition Centre
- Venue: ExCeL Exhibition Centre
- Date: 31 July 2012
- Competitors: 34 from 34 nations

Medalists
| 1st place, gold medalist(s) | | Kim Jae-Bum | South Korea |
| 2nd place, silver medalist(s) | | Ole Bischof | Germany |
| 3rd place, bronze medalist(s) | | Ivan Nifontov | Russia |
| 3rd place, bronze medalist(s) | | Antoine Valois-Fortier | Canada |

Men's 81 kg competition in judo at the 2012 Summer Olympics in London, United Kingdom, took place at ExCeL London.

The gold and silver medals were determined by a single-elimination tournament, with the winner of the final taking gold and the loser receiving silver. Judo events awarded two bronze medals. Quarterfinal losers competed in a repechage match for the right to face a semifinal loser for a bronze medal (that is, the judokas defeated in quarterfinals A and B competed against each other, with the winner of that match facing the semifinal loser from the other half of the bracket).

== Schedule ==
All times are British Summer Time (UTC+1)

| Date | Time | Round |
|---|---|---|
| Tuesday, 31 July 2012 | 09:30; 14:00; 16:10 | Qualifications; Semifinals; Final |

== Results ==
=== Finals ===
Semi-finals
Travis Stevens (USA) | 0000
Ole Bischof (GER) | 0000
Kim Jae-Bum (KOR) | 0100
Ivan Nifontov (RUS) | 0001

Final
Ole Bischof (GER) | 0001
Kim Jae-Bum (KOR) | 0020

=== Repechages ===
| Repechage | | Bronze medal |
| Leandro Guilheiro (BRA) | 0002 |
| Takahiro Nakai (JPN) | 0011 | Takahiro Nakai (JPN) | 0000 |
| | | Ivan Nifontov (RUS) | 0201 |

| Repechage | | Bronze medal |
| Emmanuel Lucenti (ARG) | 0001 |
| Antoine Valois-Fortier (CAN) | 0101 | Antoine Valois-Fortier (CAN) | 0011 |
| | | Travis Stevens (USA) | 0000 |

=== Pool A ===
First Round

Second Round
L Guilheiro (BRA) | 0010
K Ovčiņņikovs (LAT) | 0002
L Saryee (LBR) | 0000
S Attaf (MAR) | 1000
T Stevens (USA) | 1010
A Sedej (SLO) | 0002
T Marijanović (CRO) | 0001
A Tchrikishvili (GEO) | 0100

Third Round
L Guilheiro (BRA) | 1001
S Attaf (MAR) | 0001
T Stevens (USA) | 1000
A Tchrikishvili (GEO) | 0000

Quarterfinals
L Guilheiro (BRA) | 0000
T Stevens (USA) | 0010

=== Pool B ===
First Round
A Vasylenko (UKR) | 0001
I Bozbayev (KAZ) | 1000

Second Round
O Bischof (GER) | 0101
A Ciano (ITA) | 0001
I Bozbayev (KAZ) | 0200
S Denanyoh (TOG) | 0000
T Nakai (JPN) | 1000
B Munyonga (ZAM) | 0000
J Musil (CZE) | 0001
S Toma (MDA) | 1000

Third Round
O Bischof (GER) | 1011
I Bozbayev (KAZ) | 0012
T Nakai (JPN) | 0101
S Toma (MDA) | 0003

Quarterfinals
O Bischof (GER) | 1010
T Nakai (JPN) | 0000

=== Pool C ===
First Round

Second Round
J-B Kim (KOR) | 0010
Y Imamov (UZB) | 0001
P Wiradamungga (INA) | 0001
L Csoknyai (HUN) | 0200
A Schmitt (FRA) | 0000
G Elmont (NED) | 0001
F Ratsimiziva (MAD) | 0001
E Lucenti (ARG) | 1000

Third Round
J-B Kim (KOR) | 0010
L Csoknyai (HUN) | 0002
A Schmitt (FRA) | 0000
E Lucenti (ARG) | 1000

Quarterfinals
J-B Kim (KOR) | 0100
E Lucenti (ARG) | 0003

=== Pool D ===
First Round
E Mammadli (AZE) | 0001
A Valois-Fortier (CAN) | 0001

Second Round
A Valois-Fortier (CAN) | 1000
E Burton (GBR) | 0000
J Naulu (FIJ) | 0003
S Mrvaljević (MNE) | 0111
I Nifontov (RUS) | 1000
R de Windt (IOA) | 0004
O Simmonds Pea (PAN) | 0001
J Bottieau (BEL) | 1100

Third Round
A Valois-Fortier (CAN) | 0112
S Mrvaljević (MNE) | 0011
I Nifontov (RUS) | 0101
J Bottieau (BEL) | 0001

Quarterfinals
A Valois-Fortier (CAN) | 0000
I Nifontov (RUS) | 0100
