= Ō guruma =

Judo technique

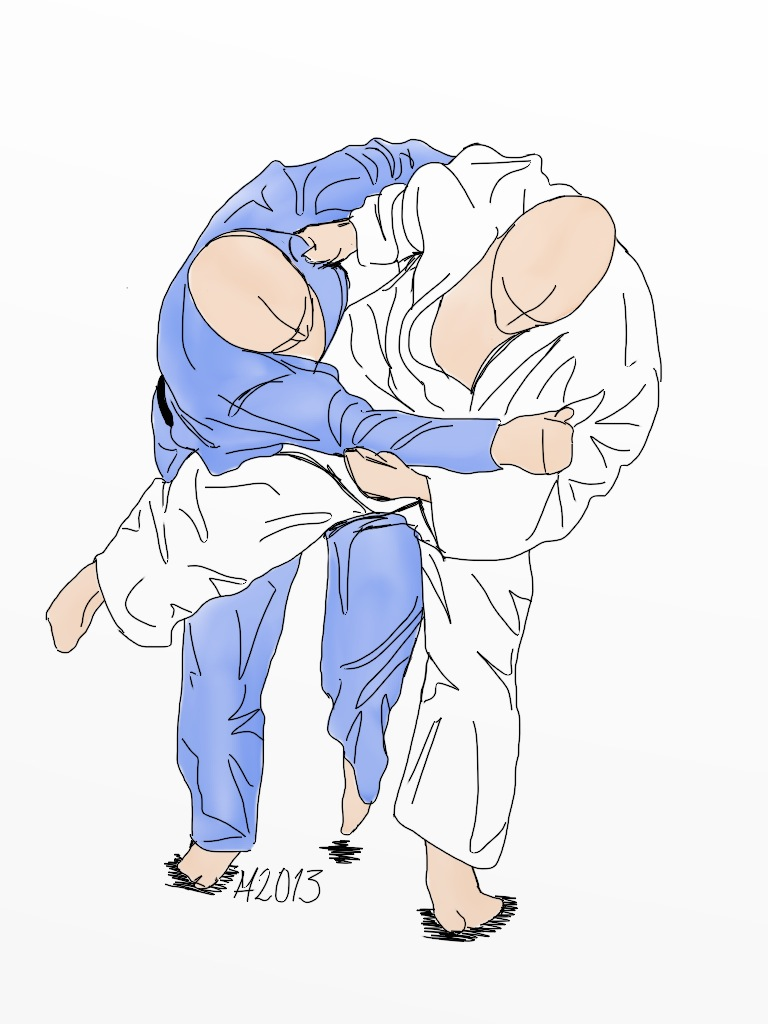
- An illustration of o guruma
- Classification: Nage-waza
- Sub classification: Ashi-waza
- Kodokan: Yes

Technique name
- Rōmaji: Ō guruma
- Japanese: 大車
- English: Large wheel
- Korean: 허리 대돌리기

Ō guruma (大車) is one of the original 40 throws of Judo as developed by Kanō Jigorō. It belongs to the fourth group of the traditional throwing list in the Gokyo no waza of the Kodokan Judo. It is also part of the current 67 Throws of Kodokan Judo. It is classified as a foot technique (ashiwaza).

== Similar Techniques, Variants, and Aliases ==
English aliases:

- Large wheel

Similar techniques:

- Ashi guruma
- Harai goshi
- Yama arashi

== See also ==
- Judo technique
- The Canon Of Judo
- Danzan Ryu
