= Ivan Petrovich Vorobyov =

Russian judoka (born 1988)

Ivan Vorobyov
Personal information
- Born: 16 July 1988 (age 37)
- Occupation: Judoka

Sport
- Country: Russia
- Sport: Judo
- Weight class: ‍–‍81 kg, ‍–‍90 kg

Achievements and titles
- World Champ.: (bronze) (2013)
- European Champ.: 5th (2013)
Medal record
Men's judo
Representing Russia
World Championships
Bronze medal – third place	2013 Rio de Janeiro	‍–‍81 kg
European Championships
Bronze medal – third place	2018 Yekaterinburg	Mixed team
IJF Grand Slam
Gold medal – first place	2015 Tyumen	‍–‍81 kg
Silver medal – second place	2012 Tokyo	‍–‍81 kg
Bronze medal – third place	2013 Moscow	‍–‍81 kg
IJF Grand Prix
Gold medal – first place	2017 The Hague	‍–‍81 kg
Silver medal – second place	2015 Tashkent	‍–‍81 kg
Bronze medal – third place	2011 Abu Dhabi	‍–‍81 kg
Bronze medal – third place	2013 Samsun	‍–‍81 kg
Bronze medal – third place	2018 Tashkent	‍–‍90 kg

Profile at external databases
- IJF: 7005
- JudoInside.com: 67807
- Updated on 24 November 2022

Ivan Petrovich Vorobyov (Russian: Воробьёв, Иван Петрович) (born 16 July 1988) is a Russian judoka. He won a bronze at the 2013 World Judo Championships in the ‍–‍81 kg category.
