= Artem Vasylenko =

Ukrainian judoka (born 1989)

Personal information
- Born: 8 December 1989 (age 36)
- Occupation: Judoka

Sport
- Country: Ukraine
- Sport: Judo
- Weight class: –81 kg

Achievements and titles
- Olympic Games: R64 (2012)
- World Champ.: 7th (2011)
- European Champ.: R16 (2008, 2009, 2012)
Medal record
Men's judo
Representing Ukraine
IJF Grand Prix
| Bronze medal – third place | 2010 Abu Dhabi | –81 kg |
| Bronze medal – third place | 2011 Baku | –81 kg |
World Juniors Championships
| Silver medal – second place | 2008 Bangkok | –81 kg |
European Junior Championships
| Gold medal – first place | 2008 Warsaw | –81 kg |
| Bronze medal – third place | 2007 Prague | –81 kg |

Profile at external databases
- IJF: 656
- JudoInside.com: 46826
- Updated on 2 January 2023

Artem Vasylenko (Ukrainian: Артем Володимирович Василенко; born 8 December 1989 in Kharkiv) is a Ukrainian judoka. He competed in the men's 81 kg event at the 2012 Summer Olympics and was eliminated in the first round by Islam Bozbayev.
