= 2013 European Judo Championships =

2013 Judo European Judo Championships
- Venue: László Papp Budapest Sports Arena
- Location: Budapest, Hungary
- Dates: 25–28 April 2013
- Competitors: 360 from 44 nations

Champions
- Men's team: Georgia (6th title)
- Women's team: Netherlands (2nd title)

Competition at external databases
- Links: IJF • EJU • JudoInside

The 2013 European Judo Championships were held in Budapest, Hungary from 25 to 28 April 2013.

== Medal overview ==
=== Men ===
Event	Gold	Silver	Bronze
−60 kg	(Georgia (country)) Amiran Papinashvili	(Switzerland) Ludovic Chammartin	(Israel) Artiom Arshansky (United Kingdom) Ashley McKenzie
−66 kg	(Georgia (country)) Lasha Shavdatuashvili	(Russia) Kamal Khan-Magomedov	(France) Dimitri Dragin (France) David Larose
−73 kg	(Slovenia) Rok Drakšič	(Georgia (country)) Nugzari Tatalashvili	(France) Pierre Duprat (Georgia (country)) Zebeda Rekhviashvili
−81 kg	(Georgia (country)) Avtandil Tchrikishvili	(Croatia) Tomislav Marijanović	(Belgium) Joachim Bottieau (France) Loic Pietri
−90 kg	(Russia) Kirill Denisov	(Georgia (country)) Varlam Liparteliani	(Lithuania) Karolis Bauža (Russia) Kirill Voprosov
−100 kg	(Czech Republic) Lukáš Krpálek	(Netherlands) Henk Grol	(Latvia) Jevgeņijs Borodavko (France) Cyrille Maret
+100 kg	(France) Teddy Riner	(Georgia (country)) Adam Okruashvili	(Hungary) Barna Bor (France) Jean-Sébastien Bonvoisin
Teams	Georgia; Shalva Kardava; Lasha Shavdatuashvili; Zebeda Rekhviashvili; Nugzari Tatalashvili; Avtandili Tchrikishvili; Levan Tsiklauri; Zviad Gogotchuri; Varlam Liparteliani; Onise Bughadze; Adam Okruashvili	Russia; Mikhail Pulyaev; Zelimkhan Ozdoev; Musa Mogushkov; Sirazhudin Magomedov; Kamil Magomedov; Grigorii Sulemin; Magomed Nazhmudinov	Germany; Sebastian Seidl; Soshin Katsumi; Rene Schneider; Hannes Conrad; Sven Maresch; Marc Odenthal; Dino Pfeiffer; Robert Zimmermann Ukraine; Hevorh Hevorhyan; Georgii Zantaraia; Serhiy Drebot; Volodymyr Soroka; Vitalii Dudchyk; Vitalii Popovych; Quedjau Nhabali; Stanislav Retinskii; Artem Bloshenko; Dmytro Luchyn

=== Women ===
Event	Gold	Silver	Bronze
−48 kg	(Hungary) Éva Csernoviczki	(Belgium) Charline Van Snick	(France) Laetitia Payet (Turkey) Ebru Şahin
−52 kg	(Russia) Natalia Kuziutina	(Romania) Andreea Chițu	(Spain) Laura Gomez Ropinon Majlinda Kelmendi
−57 kg	(France) Automne Pavia	(Austria) Sabrina Filzmoser	(Portugal) Telma Monteiro (Russia) Irina Zabludina
−63 kg	(France) Clarisse Agbegnenou	(Russia) Marta Labazina	(Israel) Yarden Gerbi (Slovenia) Tina Trstenjak
−70 kg	(Netherlands) Kim Polling	(Netherlands) Linda Bolder	(Austria) Bernadette Graf (Germany) Laura Vargas-Koch
−78 kg	(France) Lucie Louette	(Slovenia) Ana Velenšek	(Hungary) Abigél Joó (Netherlands) Marhinde Verkerk
+78 kg	(Slovenia) Lucija Polavder	(France) Émilie Andéol	(Turkey) Belkıs Zehra Kaya (Ukraine) Iryna Kindzerska
Teams	Netherlands; Birgit Ente; Miranda Wolfslag; Juul Franssen; Carla Grol; Anicka van Emden; Linda Bolder; Edith Bosch; Marhinde Verkerk	France; Priscilla Gneto; Automne Pavia; Clarisse Agbegnenou; Maëlle Di Cinti; Fanny Posvite; Lucie Louette; Audrey Tcheuméo; Émilie Andéol	Germany; Sappho Coban; Mareen Kräh; Miryam Roper; Martyna Trajdos; Iljana Marzok; Laura Vargas Koch; Jasmin Grabowski; Luise Malzahn Russia; Natalia Kuziutina; Yulia Kazarina; Ekaterina Valkova; Irina Zabludina; Anastasia Beloivanova; Marta Labazina; Margarita Gurtsieva; Ekaterina Denisenkova; Anaid Mkhitaryan; Anastasiya Dmitrieva

=== Medal table ===
* Host nation (Hungary)

Rank	Nation	Gold	Silver	Bronze	Total
1	Georgia	4	3	1	8
2	France	4	2	5	11
3	Russia	2	3	3	8
4	Netherlands	2	2	1	5
5	Slovenia	2	1	1	4
6	Hungary*	1	0	2	3
7	Czech Republic	1	0	0	1
8	Austria	0	1	1	2
8	Belgium	0	1	1	2
10	Croatia	0	1	0	1
10	Romania	0	1	0	1
10	Switzerland	0	1	0	1
13	Germany	0	0	3	3
14	Israel	0	0	2	2
14	Turkey	0	0	2	2
14	Ukraine	0	0	2	2
17	Great Britain	0	0	1	1
17	IJF	0	0	1	1
17	Latvia	0	0	1	1
17	Lithuania	0	0	1	1
17	Portugal	0	0	1	1
17	Spain	0	0	1	1
Totals (22 entries)		16	16	30	62

== Results overview ==
=== Men ===
==== –60 kg ====
Position	Team	Country
1.	Amiran Papinashvili	GEO
2.	Ludovic Chammartin	SUI
3.	Artiom Arshansky	ISR
3.	Ashley McKenzie	GBR
5.	Yanislav Gerchev	BUL
5.	Ludwig Paischer	AUT
7.	Jeroen Mooren	NED
7.	Pavel Petřikov	CZE

==== –66 kg ====
Position	Team	Country
1.	Lasha Shavdatuashvili	GEO
2.	Kamal Khan-Magumedov	RUS
3.	Dimitri Dragin	FRA
3.	David Larose	FRA
5.	Nijat Shikhalizade	AZE
5.	Bence Zámbori	HUN
7.	Sergiu Oleinic	POR
7.	Dzmitry Shershan	BLR

==== –73 kg ====
Position	Team	Country
1.	Rok Drakšič	SLO
2.	Nugzari Tatalashvili	GEO
3.	Pierre Duprat	FRA
3.	Zebeda Rekhviashvili	GEO
5.	Murat Kodzokov	RUS
5.	Dirk Van Tichelt	BEL
7.	Musa Mogushkov	RUS
7.	Sagi Muki	ISR

==== –81 kg ====
Position	Team	Country
1.	Avtandil Tchrikishvili	GEO
2.	Tomislav Marijanović	CRO
3.	Joachim Bottieau	BEL
3.	Loic Pietri	FRA
5.	Levan Tsiklauri	GEO
5.	Ivan Vorobev	RUS
7.	Vitalii Dudchyk	UKR
7.	Srđan Mrvaljević	MNE

==== –90 kg ====
Position	Team	Country
1.	Kirill Denisov	RUS
2.	Varlam Liparteliani	GEO
3.	Karolis Bauza	LTU
3.	Kirill Voprosov	RUS
5.	Aleksandar Kukolj	SRB
5.	Marc Odenthal	GER
7.	Celio Dias	POR
7.	Walter Facente	ITA

==== –100 kg ====
Position	Team	Country
1.	Lukas Krpalek	CZE
2.	Henk Grol	NED
3.	Jevgenijs Borodavko	LAT
3.	Cyrille Maret	FRA
5.	Elmar Gasimov	AZE
5.	Or Sasson	ISR
7.	Adlan Bisultanov	RUS
7.	Toma Nikiforov	BEL

==== +100 kg ====
Position	Team	Country
1.	Teddy Riner	FRA
2.	Adam Okruashvili	GEO
3.	Jean-Sebastien Bonvoisin	FRA
3.	Barna Bor	HUN
5.	Ceraj Matjaz	SLO
5.	Renat Saidov	RUS
7.	Marius Paskevicius	LTU
7.	Robert Zimmermann	GER

==== Teams ====
Position	Team	Country
1.	Georgia	GEO
2.	Russia	RUS
3.	Germany	GER
3.	Ukraine	UKR

=== Women ===
==== –48 kg ====
Position	Team	Country
1.	Éva Csernoviczki	HUN
2.	Charline Van Snick	BEL
3.	Laetitia Payet	FRA
3.	Ebru Şahin	TUR
5.	Sümeyye Akkuş	TUR
5.	Amelie Rosseneu	BEL
7.	Kay Kraus	GER
7.	Valentina Moscatt	ITA

==== –52 kg ====
Position	Team	Country
1.	Natalia Kuziutina	RUS
2.	Andreea Chițu	ROU
3.	Laura Gomez Ropinon	ESP
3.	Majlinda Kelmendi	IJF
5.	Odette Giuffrida	ITA
5.	Mareen Kraeh	GER
7.	Gili Cohen	ISR
7.	Barbara Maros	HUN

==== –57 kg ====
Position	Team	Country
1.	Automne Pavia	FRA
2.	Sabrina Filzmoser	AUT
3.	Telma Monteiro	POR
3.	Irina Zabludina	RUS
5.	Hedvig Karakas	HUN
5.	Sanne Verhagen	NED
7.	Shushana Hevondian	UKR
7.	Jovana Rogić	SRB

==== –63 kg ====
Position	Team	Country
1.	Clarisse Agbegnenou	FRA
2.	Marta Labazina	RUS
3.	Yarden Gerbi	ISR
3.	Tina Trstenjak	SLO
5.	Hilde Drexler	AUT
5.	Edwige Gwend	ITA
7.	Anna Bernholm	SWE
7.	Szabina Gerscak	HUN

==== –70 kg ====
Position	Team	Country
1.	Kim Polling	NED
2.	Linda Bolder	NED
3.	Bernadette Graf	AUT
3.	Laura Vargas-Koch	GER
5.	Barbara Matic	CRO
5.	Juliane Robra	SUI
7.	Iljana Marzok	GER
7.	Anka Pogačnik	SLO

==== –78 kg ====
Position	Team	Country
1.	Lucie Louette	FRA
2.	Ana Velensek	SLO
3.	Abigél Joó	HUN
3.	Marhinde Verkerk	NED
5.	Luise Malzahn	GER
5.	Audrey Tcheumeo	FRA
7.	Natalie Powell	GBR
7.	Viktoriia Turks	UKR

==== +78 kg ====
Position	Team	Country
1.	Lucija Polavder	SLO
2.	Emilie Andeol	FRA
3.	Belkıs Zehra Kaya	TUR
3.	Iryna Kindzerska	UKR
5.	Gülşah Kocatürk	TUR
5.	Jasmin Kuelbs	GER
7.	Larisa Ceric	BIH
7.	Carola Uilenhoed	NED

==== Teams ====
Position	Team	Country
1.	Netherlands	NED
2.	France	FRA
3.	Germany	GER
3.	Russia	RUS
