= Hussein Ali (judoka) =

Iraqi judoka

Personal information
- Born: 24 November 1990 (age 34)
- Occupation: Judoka

Sport
- Sport: Judo

Profile at external databases
- JudoInside.com: 70685

Hussein Ali Hussein Al-Aameri (born November 24, 1990) is an Iraqi judoka. He competed at the 2016 Summer Olympics in the men's 81 kg event, in which he was eliminated by Paul Kibikai in the second round.
