= 2011 European Judo Championships – Men's team =

Judo competition

Judo Men's team at the 2011 European Judo Championships
- Venue: Abdi İpekçi Arena
- Location: Istanbul, Turkey
- Date: 24 April
- Nations: 12

Medalists
| gold medal | Ukraine (1st title) |
| silver medal | France |
| bronze medal | Germany |
| bronze medal | Georgia |

Competition at external databases
- Links: EJU • JudoInside

The men's team competition at the 2011 European Judo Championships was held on 24 April at the Abdi İpekçi Arena in Istanbul, Turkey.

== Results ==
Round of 16
Germany | 4
Moldova | 1
Ukraine | 5
Spain | 0
Greece | 3
Turkey | 2
Russia | 2
Poland | 3

Quarter-finals
Georgia | 3
Germany | 2
Ukraine | 3
Great Britain | 2
France | 5
Greece | 0
Poland | 3
Estonia | 2

Semi-finals
Georgia | 2
Ukraine | 3
France | 4
Poland | 1

Final
Ukraine | 3
France | 2

=== Repechage ===
Repechage
Germany | 3
Great Britain | 2

Third place
Germany | 3
Poland | 2

Repechage
Greece | 1
Estonia | 4

Third place
Estonia | 0
Georgia | 5
