= 2014 European Judo Championships =

2014 Judo European Judo Championships
- Venue: Sud de France Arena
- Location: Montpellier, France
- Dates: 24–27 April 2014
- Competitors: 321 from 43 nations

Champions
- Men's team: Georgia (7th title)
- Women's team: France (19th title)

Competition at external databases
- Links: IJF • JudoInside

The 2014 European Judo Championships were held in Montpellier, France from 24 to 27 April 2014.

== Medal overview ==
=== Men ===
Event	Gold	Silver	Bronze
−60 kg	(Russia) Beslan Mudranov	(Georgia (country)) Amiran Papinashvili	(Armenia) Hovhannes Davtyan (Azerbaijan) Ilgar Mushkiyev
−66 kg	(France) Loïc Korval	(France) David Larose	(Russia) Mikhail Pulyaev (Belarus) Dzmitry Shershan
−73 kg	(Netherlands) Dex Elmont	(France) Ugo Legrand	(Slovenia) Rok Drakšič (Hungary) Miklós Ungvári
−81 kg	(Georgia (country)) Avtandil Tchrikishvili	(France) Loïc Pietri	(Hungary) Szabolcs Krizsán (Germany) Sven Maresch
−90 kg	(Georgia (country)) Varlam Liparteliani	(Russia) Kirill Voprosov	(France) Alexandre Iddir (Hungary) Krisztián Tóth
−100 kg	(Czech Republic) Lukáš Krpálek	(Azerbaijan) Elmar Gasimov	(Russia) Adlan Bisultanov (France) Cyrille Maret
+100 kg	(France) Teddy Riner	(Georgia (country)) Adam Okruashvili	(Germany) Andre Breitbarth (Lithuania) Marius Paškevičius
Teams	Georgia; Shalva Kardava; Amiran Papinashvili; Zebeda Rekhviashvili; Nugzari Tatalashvili; Avtandili Tchrikishvili; Ushangi Margiani; Zviad Gogotchuri; Varlam Liparteliani; Levani Matiashvili; Adam Okruashvili	Russia; Kamal Khan-Magomedov; Alim Gadanov; Denis Yartsev; Musa Mogushkov; Sirazhudin Magomedov; Murat Khabachirov; Grigorii Sulemin; Renat Saidov; Alexander Mikhaylin	Germany; Rene Schneider; Tobias Englmaier; Christopher Völk; Alexander Wieczerzak; Sven Maresch; Marc Odenthal; Karl-Richard Frey; Andre Breitbarth France; Loïc Korval; Ugo Legrand; Florent Urani; Loïc Pietri; Alain Schmitt; Romain Buffet; Alexandre Iddir; Teddy Riner; Cyrille Maret

=== Women ===
Event	Gold	Silver	Bronze
−48 kg	(Hungary) Éva Csernoviczki	(France) Amandine Buchard	(Ukraine) Maryna Cherniak (Russia) Kristina Rumyantseva
−52 kg	(Kosovo) Majlinda Kelmendi	(Russia) Natalia Kuziutina	(Romania) Andreea Chițu (Israel) Gili Cohen
−57 kg	(France) Automne Pavia	(Germany) Miryam Roper	(Austria) Sabrina Filzmoser (Portugal) Telma Monteiro
−63 kg	(France) Clarisse Agbegnenou	(Slovenia) Tina Trstenjak	(Poland) Agata Ozdoba-Błach (Netherlands) Anicka van Emden
−70 kg	(Netherlands) Kim Polling	(Germany) Laura Vargas-Koch	(Austria) Bernadette Graf (Croatia) Barbara Matić
−78 kg	(France) Audrey Tcheuméo	(Netherlands) Marhinde Verkerk	(Hungary) Abigél Joó (France) Lucie Louette
+78 kg	(France) Émilie Andéol	(Bosnia and Herzegovina) Larisa Cerić	(Germany) Franziska Konitz (Germany) Jasmin Kuelbs
Teams	France; Pénélope Bonna; Annabelle Euranie; Automne Pavia; Clarisse Agbegnenou; Anne-Laure Bellard; Gévrise Émane; Fanny Estelle Posvite; Émilie Andéol; Audrey Tcheuméo	Germany; Mareen Kräh; Romy Tarangul; Miryam Roper; Martyna Trajdos; Iljana Marzok; Laura Vargas Koch; Luise Malzahn; Franziska Konitz; Jasmin Grabowski	Poland; Zuzanna Pawlikowska; Ewa Konieczny; Arleta Podolak; Agata Ozdoba; Halima Mohamed-Seghir; Katarzyna Kłys; Karolina Tałach; Katarzyna Furmanek Slovenia; Petra Nareks; Vlora Beđeti; Manja Kropf; Tina Trstenjak; Urška Žolnir; Anka Pogačnik; Anamari Velenšek; Lucija Polavder

=== Medal table ===
* Host nation (France)

Rank	Nation	Gold	Silver	Bronze	Total
1	France*	7	4	4	15
2	Georgia	3	2	0	5
3	Netherlands	2	1	1	4
4	Russia	1	3	3	7
5	Hungary	1	0	4	5
6	Czech Republic	1	0	0	1
6	Kosovo	1	0	0	1
8	Germany	0	3	5	8
9	Slovenia	0	1	2	3
10	Azerbaijan	0	1	1	2
11	Bosnia and Herzegovina	0	1	0	1
12	Austria	0	0	2	2
12	Poland	0	0	2	2
14	Armenia	0	0	1	1
14	Belarus	0	0	1	1
14	Croatia	0	0	1	1
14	Israel	0	0	1	1
14	Lithuania	0	0	1	1
14	Portugal	0	0	1	1
14	Romania	0	0	1	1
14	Ukraine	0	0	1	1
Totals (21 entries)		16	16	32	64

== Results overview ==
=== Men ===
==== –60 kg ====
Position	Team	Country
1.	Beslan Mudranov	Russia
2.	Amiran Papinashvili	Georgia
3.	Hovhannes Davtyan	Armenia
3.	Ilgar Mushkiyev	Azerbaijan
5.	Ashley McKenzie	Great Britain
5.	Orkhan Safarov	Azerbaijan
7.	Arsen Galstyan	Russia
7.	Ludwig Paischer	Austria

==== –66 kg ====
Position	Team	Country
1.	Loic Korval	France
2.	David Larose	France
3.	Mikhail Pulyaev	Russia
3.	Dzmitry Shershan	Belarus
5.	Sugoi Uriarte Marcos	Spain
5.	Georgii Zantaraia	Ukraine
7.	Adrian Gomboc	Slovenia
7.	Nijat Shikhalizada	Azerbaijan

==== –73 kg ====
Position	Team	Country
1.	Dex Elmont	Netherlands
2.	Ugo Legrand	France
3.	Rok Drakšič	Slovenia
3.	Miklós Ungvári	Hungary
5.	Rustam Orujov	Azerbaijan
5.	Nugzari Tatalashvili	Georgia
7.	Enrico Parlati	Italy
7.	Zebeda Rekhviashvili	Georgia

==== –81 kg ====
Position	Team	Country
1.	Avtandil Tchrikishvili	Georgia
2.	Loïc Pietri	France
3.	Szabolcs Krizsán	Hungary
3.	Sven Maresch	Germany
5.	Roman Moustopoulos	Greece
5.	Aliaksandr Stsiashenka	Belarus
7.	Antonio Ciano	Italy
7.	Diogo Lima	Portugal

==== –90 kg ====
Position	Team	Country
1.	Varlam Liparteliani	Georgia
2.	Kirill Voprosov	Russia
3.	Alexandre Iddir	France
3.	Krisztián Tóth	Hungary
5.	Joakim Dvärby	Sweden
5.	Shahin Gahramanov	Azerbaijan
7.	Karolis Bauža	Lithuania
7.	Zviad Gogotchuri	Georgia

==== –100 kg ====
Position	Team	Country
1.	Lukáš Krpálek	Czech Republic
2.	Elmar Gasimov	Azerbaijan
3.	Adlan Bisultanov	Russia
3.	Cyrille Maret	France
5.	Karl-Richard Frey	Germany
5.	Toma Nikiforov	Belgium
7.	Artem Bloshenko	Ukraine
7.	Elkhan Mammadov	Azerbaijan

==== +100 kg ====
Position	Team	Country
1.	Teddy Riner	France
2.	Adam Okruashvili	Georgia
3.	Andre Breitbarth	Germany
3.	Marius Paškevičius	Lithuania
5.	Matjaž Ceraj	Slovenia
5.	Levani Matiashvili	Georgia
7.	Stanislav Bondarenko	Ukraine
7.	Roy Meyer	Netherlands

==== Teams ====
Position	Team	Country
1.	Georgia	Georgia
2.	Russia	Russia
3.	Germany	Germany
3.	France	France
5.	Czech Republic	Czech Republic
5.	Slovenia	Slovenia
7.	Ukraine	Ukraine
7.	Portugal	Portugal

=== Women ===
==== –48 kg ====
Position	Team	Country
1.	Éva Csernoviczki	Hungary
2.	Amandine Buchard	France
3.	Maryna Cherniak	Ukraine
3.	Kristina Rumyantseva	Russia
5.	Valentina Moscatt	Italy
5.	Amelie Rosseneu	Israel
7.	Sümeyye Akkuş	Turkey
7.	Julia Figueroa	Spain

==== –52 kg ====
Position	Team	Country
1.	Majlinda Kelmendi	Kosovo
2.	Natalia Kuziutina	Russia
3.	Andreea Stefania Chitu	Romania
3.	Gili Cohen	Israel
5.	Mareen Kräh	Germany
5.	Yulia Kazarina	Russia
7.	Laura Gomez Ropinon	Spain
7.	Zhanna Stankevich	Armenia

==== –57 kg ====
Position	Team	Country
1.	Automne Pavia	France
2.	Miryam Roper	Germany
3.	Sabrina Filzmoser	Austria
3.	Telma Monteiro	Portugal
5.	Corina Oana Caprioriu	Romania
5.	Ivelina Ilieva	Bulgaria
7.	Hedvig Karakas	Hungary
7.	Irina Zabludina	Russia

==== –63 kg ====
Position	Team	Country
1.	Clarisse Agbegnenou	France
2.	Tina Trstenjak	Slovenia
3.	Agata Ozdoba	Poland
3.	Anicka Van Emden	Netherlands
5.	Hilde Drexler	Austria
5.	Edwige Gwend	Italy
7.	Martyna Trajdos	Germany
7.	Kathrin Unterwurzacher	Austria

==== –70 kg ====
Position	Team	Country
1.	Kim Polling	Netherlands
2.	Laura Vargas-Koch	Germany
3.	Bernadette Graf	Austria
3.	Barbara Matić	Croatia
5.	María Bernabéu	Spain
5.	Fanny Estelle Posvite	France
7.	Sally Conway	Great Britain
7.	Juliane Robra	Switzerland

==== –78 kg ====
Position	Team	Country
1.	Audrey Tcheuméo	France
2.	Marhinde Verkerk	Netherlands
3.	Abigél Joó	Hungary
3.	Lucie Louette	France
5.	Luise Malzahn	Germany
5.	Guusje Steenhuis	Netherlands
7.	Anastasiya Dmitrieva	Russia
7.	Ivana Maranić	Croatia

==== +78 kg ====
Position	Team	Country
1.	Émilie Andéol	France
2.	Larisa Ceric	Bosnia and Herzegovina
3.	Franziska Konitz	Germany
3.	Jasmin Kuelbs	Germany
5.	Sandra Jablonskytė	Lithuania
5.	Maryna Slutskaya	Belarus
7.	Gülşah Kocatürk	Turkey
7.	Lucija Polavder	Slovenia

==== Teams ====
Position	Team	Country
1.	France	France
2.	Germany	Germany
3.	Poland	Poland
3.	Slovenia	Slovenia
5.	Russia	Russia
5.	Great Britain	Great Britain
7.	Bosnia and Herzegovina	Bosnia and Herzegovina
7.	Hungary	Hungary
