= Emmanuel Lucenti =

Argentine judoka (born 1984)

Personal information
- Born: 23 November 1984 (age 41) San Miguel de Tucuman, Argentina
- Occupation: Judoka

Sport
- Country: Argentina
- Sport: Judo
- Weight class: ‍–‍81 kg

Achievements and titles
- Olympic Games: 7th (2012)
- World Champ.: R32 (2010, 2011, 2013, 2014, 2015, 2018)
- Pan American Champ.: (2007, 2015, 2017, 2021)
Medal record
Men's judo
Representing Argentina
Pan American Games
Bronze medal – third place	2011 Guadalajara	‍–‍81 kg
Pan American Championships
Silver medal – second place	2007 Montreal	‍–‍81 kg
Silver medal – second place	2015 Edmonton	‍–‍81 kg
Silver medal – second place	2017 Panama City	‍–‍81 kg
Silver medal – second place	2021 Guadalajara	‍–‍81 kg
Bronze medal – third place	2006 Buenos Aires	‍–‍81 kg
Bronze medal – third place	2009 Buenos Aires	‍–‍81 kg
Bronze medal – third place	2010 San Salvador	‍–‍81 kg
Bronze medal – third place	2011 Guadalajara	‍–‍81 kg
Bronze medal – third place	2012 Montreal	‍–‍81 kg
IJF Grand Prix
Gold medal – first place	2017 Cancún	‍–‍81 kg
Silver medal – second place	2013 Miami	‍–‍81 kg
Bronze medal – third place	2009 Qingdao	‍–‍81 kg
Pan American Junior Championships
Silver medal – second place	2001 Acapulco	‍–‍73 kg

Profile at external databases
- IJF: 581
- JudoInside.com: 17657
- Updated on 7 December 2022

Emmanuel "Emma" Lucenti (born 23 November 1984) is a judoka from Argentina. He competed at the 2008, 2012 and 2016 Summer Olympics in the men's half-middleweight (‍–‍81 kg). At the 2008 Summer Olympics, he lost in second round to Euan Burton. At the 2012 Summer Olympics, he reached the quarter-finals, where he lost to Kim Jae-bum. As Kim continued on to the gold medal match, Lucenti took part in the bronze medal repechage, where he lost in the first round to Antoine Valois-Fortier. At the 2016 Summer Olympics, Lucenti was once again eliminated by Valois-Fortier, this time in the third round.

Lucenti qualified to represent Argentina at the 2020 Summer Olympics.

Lucenti's older brother Rodrigo was also an Olympic judoka, competing in the lightweight (‍–‍73 kg) category.
