= Adlan Bisultanov =

Russian judoka (born 1989)

Personal information
- Born: 15 August 1989 (age 36)
- Occupation: Judoka

Sport
- Country: Russia
- Sport: Judo
- Weight class: ‍–‍100 kg

Achievements and titles
- World Champ.: R32 (2015)
- European Champ.: (bronze) (2014)
Medal record
Men's judo
Representing Russia
European Championships
Bronze medal – third place	2014 Montpellier	‍–‍100 kg
IJF Grand Slam
Gold medal – first place	2015 Baku	‍–‍100 kg
Silver medal – second place	2016 Tyumen	‍–‍100 kg
Bronze medal – third place	2014 Paris	‍–‍100 kg
IJF Grand Prix
Gold medal – first place	2013 Samsun	‍–‍100 kg
Gold medal – first place	2014 Zagreb	‍–‍100 kg
Gold medal – first place	2016 Zagreb	‍–‍100 kg
Gold medal – first place	2017 Antalya	‍–‍100 kg
Silver medal – second place	2014 Samsun	‍–‍100 kg
Bronze medal – third place	2013 Qingdao	‍–‍100 kg
Bronze medal – third place	2014 Havana	‍–‍100 kg
Bronze medal – third place	2015 Budapest	‍–‍100 kg
Bronze medal – third place	2016 Düsseldorf	‍–‍100 kg
European U23 Championships
Gold medal – first place	2011 Tyumen	‍–‍100 kg

Profile at external databases
- IJF: 9259
- JudoInside.com: 67789
- Updated on 14 November 2022

Adlan Bisultanov (born 15 August 1989) is a Russian judoka.

Bisultanov is the gold medalist of the 2017 Judo Grand Prix Antalya in the ‍–‍100 kg category.
