= Ashi guruma =

Judo technique

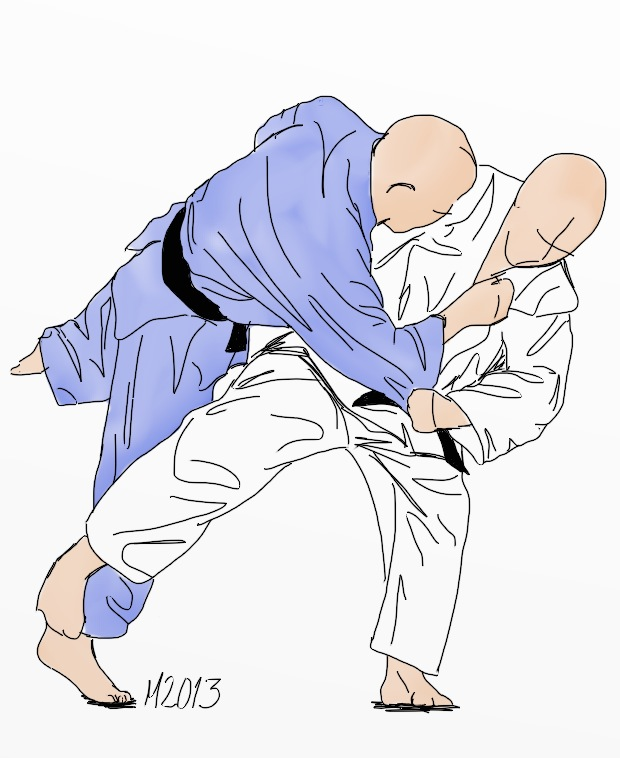
- An illustration of ashi guruma
- Classification: Nage-waza
- Sub classification: Ashi-waza
- Successive techniques: Juji gatame
- Counter: Sweep
- Kodokan: Yes

Technique name
- Rōmaji: Ashi-guruma
- Japanese: 足車
- English: Leg wheel
- Korean: 다리 대돌리기

Ashi guruma (ja. 足車) ("leg wheel") is a throw in judo. It is one of the original 40 throws of Judo as developed by Kano Jigoro. It belongs to the third group of the traditional throwing list in the Gokyo no waza of the Kodokan Judo. It is also included in the current 67 Throws of Kodokan Judo and is classified as a foot technique (ashiwaza).

== Technique Description ==
Similar to Osoto Gari, but instead of trapping the uke's leading leg and throwing him directly to his rear, Ashi Guruma is executed by trapping the uke's trailing leg to make his torso twist and fall about an oblique axis formed by the tori's tripping leg.

Ashi guruma is also similar to o guruma.

== See also ==
- The Canon Of Judo
