= Omar Simmonds Pea =

Panamanian judoka (born 1981)

Omar Simmonds Pea (born August 15, 1981, in Panama City) is a Panamanian judoka. He competed in the men's 81 kg event at the 2012 Summer Olympics and was eliminated in the second round by Joachim Bottieau.
