= Juan Diego Turcios =

Salvadoran judoka (born 1992)

Personal information
- Born: 22 September 1992 (age 33) Ilobasco, El Salvador

Sport
- Sport: Judo
Medal record
Representing El Salvador
Central American Games
Gold medal – first place	2017 Managua	81kg

Juan Diego Turcios Melgar (born September 22, 1992) is a Salvadoran judoka. He competed at the 2016 Summer Olympics in the men's 81 kg event, in which he was eliminated by Georgian judoka Avtandil Tchrikishvili in the third round.
