= Paul Kibikai =

Gabonese judoka

Paul Kibikai (born April 4, 1991) is a Gabonese judoka. He competed at the 2016 Summer Olympics in the men's 81 kg event, in which he was eliminated by Takanori Nagase in the third round.
