= Eoin Coughlan =

Australian Olympic judoka

Eoin Coughlan (born 31 March 1992) is an Australian judoka. He competed at the 2016 Summer Olympics in the men's 81 kg event, in which he was eliminated in the second round by Lee Seung-soo.
