= Leandro Guilheiro =

Brazilian judoka (born 1983)

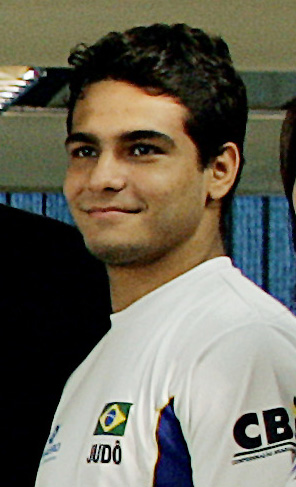

Personal information
- Born: Leandro Marques Guilheiro; 7 August 1983 (age 42) Suzano, Brazil
- Occupation: Judoka

Sport
- Country: Brazil
- Sport: Judo
- Weight class: –73 kg, –81 kg

Achievements and titles
- Olympic Games: (bronze) (2004, 2008)
- World Champ.: (silver) (2010)
- Pan American Champ.: (2009, 2011, 2012)
Medal record
Men's judo
Representing Brazil
Olympic Games
Bronze medal – third place	2004 Athens	‍–‍73 kg
Bronze medal – third place	2008 Beijing	‍–‍73 kg
World Championships
Silver medal – second place	2010 Tokyo	‍–‍81 kg
Bronze medal – third place	2011 Paris	‍–‍81 kg
Pan American Games
Gold medal – first place	2011 Guadalajara	‍–‍81 kg
Silver medal – second place	2007 Rio de Janeiro	‍–‍73 kg
Pan American Championships
Gold medal – first place	2009 Buenos Aires	‍–‍73 kg
Gold medal – first place	2011 Guadalajara	‍–‍81 kg
Gold medal – first place	2012 Montreal	‍–‍81 kg
World Masters
Silver medal – second place	2011 Baku	‍–‍81 kg
IJF Grand Slam
Gold medal – first place	2010 Paris	‍–‍81 kg
Gold medal – first place	2011 Rio de Janeiro	‍–‍81 kg
Silver medal – second place	2009 Rio de Janeiro	‍–‍73 kg
Silver medal – second place	2011 Tokyo	‍–‍81 kg
Bronze medal – third place	2009 Tokyo	‍–‍81 kg
Bronze medal – third place	2010 Rio de Janeiro	‍–‍81 kg
Bronze medal – third place	2010 Tokyo	‍–‍81 kg
IJF Grand Prix
Silver medal – second place	2010 Tunis	‍–‍81 kg
Bronze medal – third place	2011 Baku	‍–‍81 kg
World Juniors Championships
Gold medal – first place	2002 Jeju	‍–‍73 kg
Military World Games
Gold medal – first place	2011 Rio de Janeiro	‍–‍81 kg
Gold medal – first place	2015 Mungyeong	Men's team

Profile at external databases
- IJF: 431
- JudoInside.com: 26458
- Updated on 30 May 2023

Leandro Marques Guilheiro (born 7 August 1983) is a Brazilian male judoka. He won bronze medals in the lightweight (‍–‍73 kg) division at the 2004 Summer Olympics in Athens, Greece and at the 2008 Summer Olympics in Beijing. He became the first Brazilian judoka to win medals at two consecutive Olympic Games. Guilheiro plays a classical style of judo fighting in an upright stance and using techniques such as uchi mata, ippon seoi nage, morate seoi nage and o soto gari. He has done modeling work in Brazil.
