= Antoine Valois-Fortier =

Canadian judoka (born 1990)

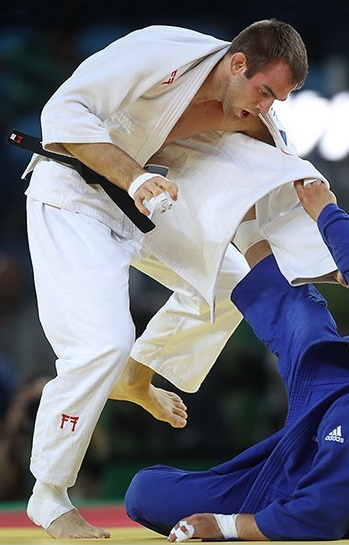
- Valois-Fortier at the 2016 Olympics

Personal information
- Nicknames: Antonio, Tony
- Born: 13 March 1990 (age 36) Quebec City, Quebec, Canada
- Home town: Montreal, Quebec, Canada
- Occupation: Judoka
- Height: 1.89 m (6 ft 2 in)

Sport
- Country: Canada
- Sport: Judo
- Weight class: –81 kg
- Rank: 5th dan black belt
- Club: Shidokan
- Coached by: Nicolas Gill; Marie-Helene Chisholm; Sergio Pessoa Sr.
- Retired: 2 December 2021

Achievements and titles
- Olympic Games: (bronze) (2012)
- World Champ.: (silver) (2014)
- Pan American Champ.: (gold) (2016, 2018, 2019)
Medal record
Men's judo
Representing Canada
Olympic Games
Bronze medal – third place	2012 London	‍–‍81 kg
World Championships
Silver medal – second place	2014 Chelyabinsk	‍–‍81 kg
Bronze medal – third place	2015 Astana	‍–‍81 kg
Bronze medal – third place	2019 Tokyo	‍–‍81 kg
Pan American Games
Bronze medal – third place	2011 Guadalajara	‍–‍81 kg
Pan American Championships
Gold medal – first place	2016 Havana	‍–‍81 kg
Gold medal – first place	2018 San José	‍–‍81 kg
Gold medal – first place	2019 Lima	‍–‍81 kg
Silver medal – second place	2012 Montreal	‍–‍81 kg
Silver medal – second place	2013 San José	‍–‍81 kg
Silver medal – second place	2014 Guayaquil	‍–‍81 kg
Bronze medal – third place	2011 Guadalajara	‍–‍81 kg
Bronze medal – third place	2015 Edmonton	‍–‍81 kg
IJF Grand Slam
Silver medal – second place	2014 Abu Dhabi	‍–‍81 kg
Silver medal – second place	2015 Tyumen	‍–‍81 kg
Silver medal – second place	2020 Budapest	‍–‍81 kg
Bronze medal – third place	2014 Baku	‍–‍81 kg
Bronze medal – third place	2014 Tyumen	‍–‍81 kg
Bronze medal – third place	2020 Paris	‍–‍81 kg
IJF Grand Prix
Gold medal – first place	2015 Ulaanbaatar	‍–‍81 kg
Gold medal – first place	2017 Hohhot	‍–‍81 kg
Silver medal – second place	2019 Montreal	‍–‍81 kg
Silver medal – second place	2019 Zagreb	‍–‍81 kg
Bronze medal – third place	2013 Düsseldorf	‍–‍81 kg
Bronze medal – third place	2014 Havana	‍–‍81 kg
Bronze medal – third place	2019 Tbilisi	‍–‍81 kg
Bronze medal – third place	2019 Antalya	‍–‍81 kg

Profile at external databases
- IJF: 2216
- JudoInside.com: 45258
- Updated on 23 May 2023

Antoine Valois-Fortier (born 13 March 1990) is a Canadian retired judoka who won the bronze medal in the −81 kg category at the 2012 Olympics, becoming the first Canadian to win a medal in Olympic judo in twelve years and the fifth to win one in Canadian history.

== Career ==
Valois-Fortier entered the 2012 Olympics ranked 21st in the world in his weight class. He pulled off several upset victories, including a win over Olympic gold medalist Elnur Mammadli, to make the quarterfinals. He lost to Ivan Nifontov of Russia, but made the repechage and defeated Emmanuel Lucenti of Argentina to enter the bronze medal match against Travis Stevens, which he then won. Valois-Fortier's win is Canada's first Olympic medal in Judo since 2000, which was a silver won by his coach Nicolas Gill, and only the fifth won by a Canadian in Olympic history.

At the 2016 Olympics he won his first two bouts, but then lost the third bout to the eventual gold medalist Khasan Khalmurzaev and the repechage match to a bronze medalist Takanori Nagase.

In June 2021, Valois-Fortier was named to Canada's 2020 Olympic team. In December 2021, Valois-Fortier announced his retirement from competitive judo. Valois-Forter will remain a part of the national team, as a coach.

== Honours ==
In 2012 Valois-Fortier was awarded the Queen Elizabeth II Diamond Jubilee Medal.

== See also ==
- Judo in Quebec
- Judo in Canada
- List of Canadian judoka
