= 2014 European Judo Championships – Men's team =

Judo competition

Judo Men's team at the 2014 European Judo Championships
- Venue: Sud de France Arena
- Location: Montpellier, France
- Date: 27 April
- Nations: 12

Medalists
| gold medal | Georgia (7th title) |
| silver medal | Russia |
| bronze medal | Germany |
| bronze medal | France |

Competition at external databases
- Links: EJU • JudoInside

The men's team competition at the 2014 European Judo Championships was held on 27 April at the Sud de France Arena in Montpellier, France.

== Results ==
Round of 16
Czech Republic | 3
United Kingdom | 2
France | 4
Israel | 1
Spain | 2
Slovenia | 3
Portugal | 3
Hungary | 2

Quarterfinals
Georgia | 5
Czech Republic | 0
Ukraine | 2
France | 3
Russia | 4
Slovenia | 1
Germany | 4
Portugal | 1

Semifinals
Georgia | 3
France | 2
Russia | 4
Germany | 1

Final
Georgia | 4
Russia | 1

=== Repechage ===
Repechage
Czech Republic | 3
Ukraine | 2

Third place
Czech Republic | 1
Germany | 4

Repechage
Slovenia | 3
Portugal | 2

Third place
Slovenia | 1
France | 4
