= Loïc Pietri =

French judoka (born 1990)

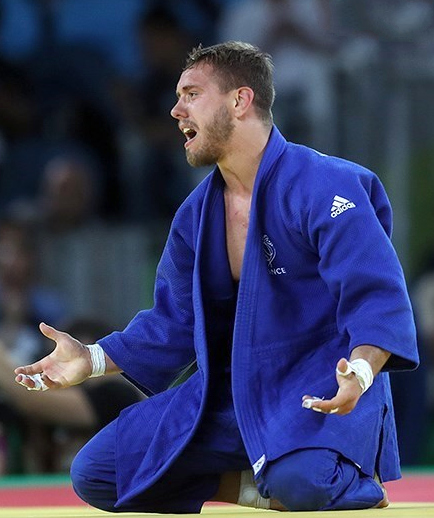
- Pietri at the 2016 Olympics

Personal information
- Born: 27 August 1990 (age 36) Nice, France
- Occupation: Judoka
- Height: 177 cm (5 ft 10 in)

Sport
- Country: France
- Sport: Judo
- Weight class: ‍–‍81 kg
- Club: Olympique Judo Nice
- Coached by: Stephane Auduc (club); Franck Chambily (national)

Achievements and titles
- Olympic Games: R32 (2016)
- World Champ.: (gold) (2013)
- European Champ.: (silver) (2014)
Medal record
Men's judo
Representing France
World Championships
Gold medal – first place	2013 Rio de Janeiro	‍–‍81 kg
Silver medal – second place	2015 Astana	‍–‍81 kg
Bronze medal – third place	2014 Chelyabinsk	‍–‍81 kg
Bronze medal – third place	2017 Budapest	Mixed team
European Games
Bronze medal – third place	2015 Baku	‍–‍81 kg
European Championships
Silver medal – second place	2014 Montpellier	‍–‍81 kg
Bronze medal – third place	2013 Budapest	‍–‍81 kg
IJF Grand Slam
Silver medal – second place	2013 Tokyo	‍–‍81 kg
Silver medal – second place	2014 Paris	‍–‍81 kg
IJF Grand Prix
Gold medal – first place	2013 Samsun	‍–‍81 kg
Gold medal – first place	2015 Samsun	‍–‍81 kg
Bronze medal – third place	2012 Düsseldorf	‍–‍81 kg
Bronze medal – third place	2015 Düsseldorf	‍–‍81 kg
World Juniors Championships
Gold medal – first place	2009 Paris	‍–‍81 kg
European Junior Championships
Gold medal – first place	2009 Yerevan	‍–‍81 kg

Profile at external databases
- IJF: 1673
- JudoInside.com: 41168
- Updated on 3 July 2023

Loïc Pietri (born 27 August 1990) is a French judoka who competes in the ‍–‍81 kg category. He won the world title in 2013, placing third in 2014 and second in 2015. At the 2016 Olympics he was eliminated in the first bout. His father, Marcel Pietri, won a silver medal at the 1986 European Championships.

Pietri worked as a television presenter for L'Équipe 21 during the 2015 Judo Grand Slam Paris. In January 2016 he had an injury on right knee that took several months to recover.
