= Alain Schmitt =

French judoka (born 1983)

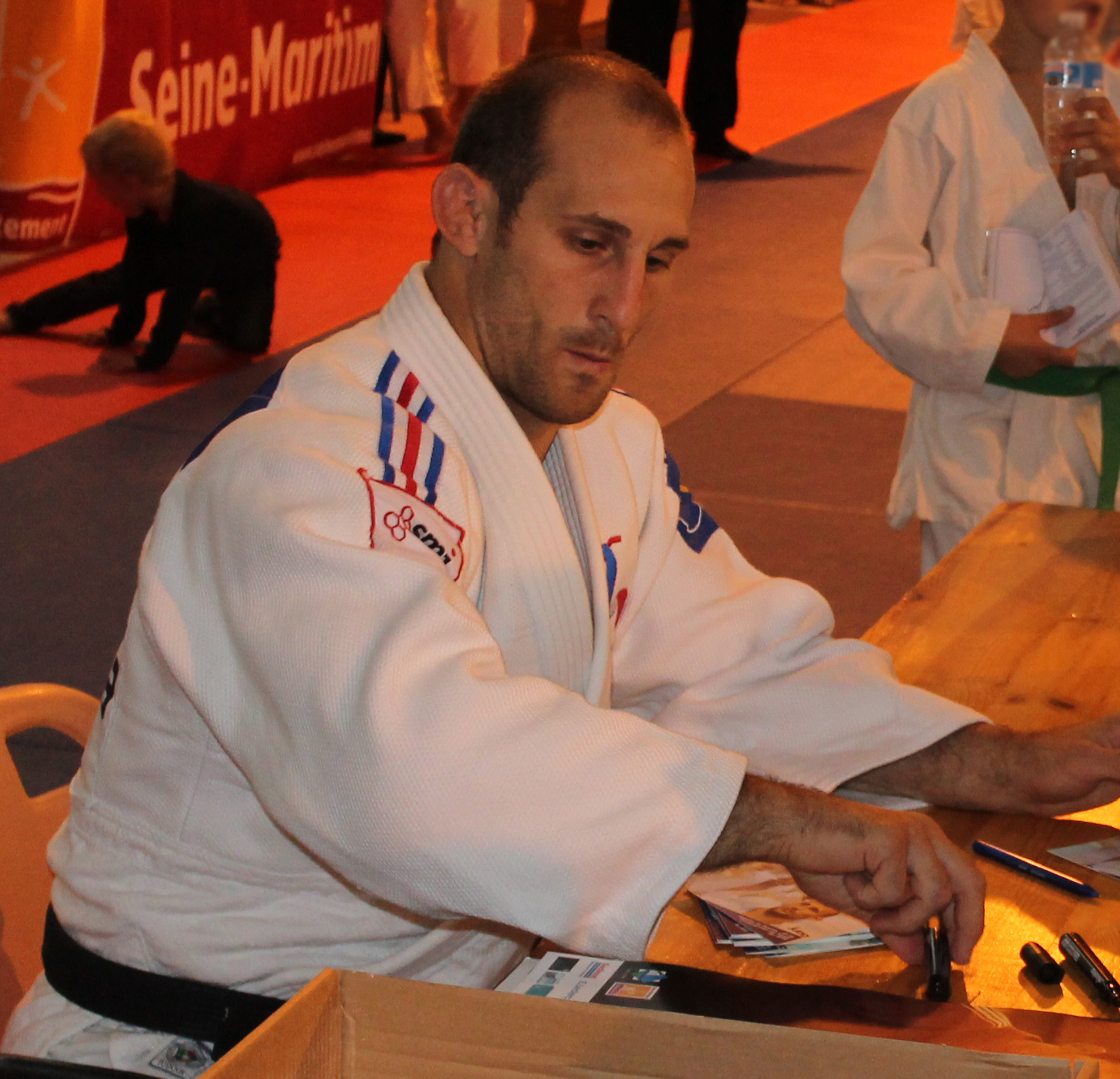

Personal information
- Born: 2 November 1983 (age 42)
- Occupation: Judo coach

Sport
- Country: France
- Sport: Judo
- Weight class: –81 kg

Achievements and titles
- Olympic Games: R16 (2012)
- World Champ.: (bronze) (2013)
- European Champ.: 5th (2011)
Medal record
Men's judo
Representing France
World Championships
Gold medal – first place	2011 Paris	Men's team
Bronze medal – third place	2013 Rio de Janeiro	‍–‍81 kg
European Championships
Silver medal – second place	2006 Belgrade	Men's team
Bronze medal – third place	2014 Montpellier	Men's team
IJF Grand Slam
Silver medal – second place	2013 Baku	‍–‍81 kg
Bronze medal – third place	2011 Paris	‍–‍81 kg
IJF Grand Prix
Gold medal – first place	2011 Amsterdam	‍–‍81 kg
Silver medal – second place	2011 Qingdao	‍–‍81 kg
Silver medal – second place	2012 Düsseldorf	‍–‍81 kg
Silver medal – second place	2015 Budapest	‍–‍81 kg
Bronze medal – third place	2014 Budapest	‍–‍81 kg
European U23 Championships
Bronze medal – third place	2005 Kyiv	‍–‍81 kg
European Junior Championships
Silver medal – second place	2002 Rotterdam	‍–‍73 kg

Profile at external databases
- IJF: 2372
- JudoInside.com: 16975
- Updated on 5 July 2023

Alain Schmitt (born 2 November 1983) is a French judoka. He competed at the 2012 Summer Olympics.

== Achievements ==
Year	Tournament	Place	Weight class
2006	European Judo Championships	5th	Half middleweight (81 kg)
2011	World Judo Championships	5th	Half middleweight (81 kg)
2013	World Judo Championships	3rd	Half middleweight (81 kg)
2014	World Judo Championships	5th	Half middleweight (81 kg)
