= Sergiu Toma =

Moldovan born Emirati judoka

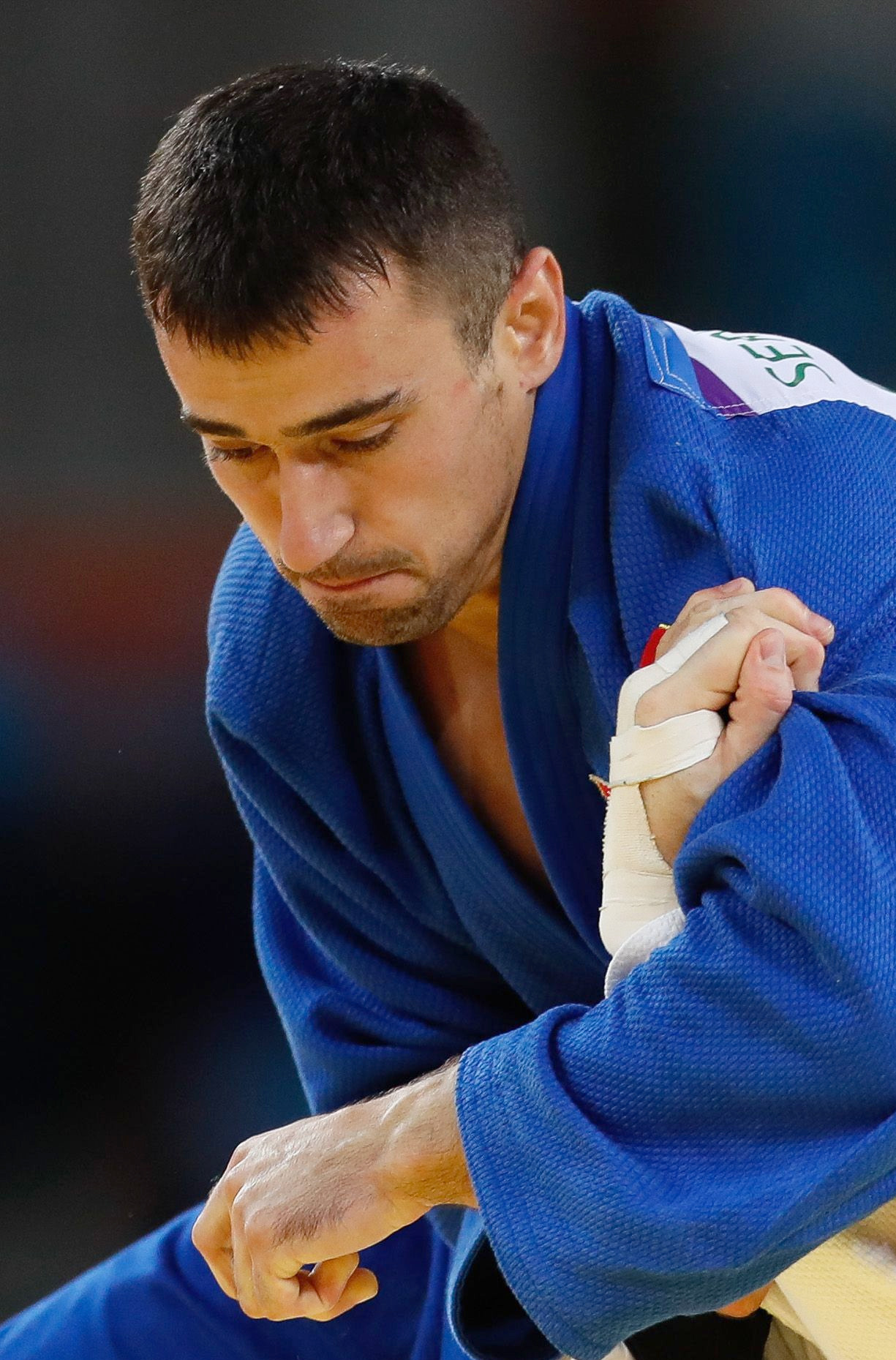
- Toma at the 2016 Olympics

Personal information
- Born: 29 January 1987 (age 39) Chișinău, Soviet Union
- Occupation: Judoka
- Height: 180 cm (5 ft 11 in)

Sport
- Country: Moldova (2009–12); United Arab Emirates (2013–)
- Sport: Judo
- Weight class: –81 kg
- Coached by: Vasile Colta

Achievements and titles
- Olympic Games: (bronze) (2016)
- World Champ.: (bronze) (2011)
- European Champ.: (silver) (2011)
Medal record
Men's judo
Representing Moldova
World Championships
Bronze medal – third place	2011 Paris	‍–‍81 kg
European Championships
Silver medal – second place	2011 Istanbul	‍–‍81 kg
IJF Grand Slam
Bronze medal – third place	2012 Paris	‍–‍81 kg
IJF Grand Prix
Bronze medal – third place	2010 Rotterdam	‍–‍81 kg
Bronze medal – third place	2012 Abu Dhabi	‍–‍81 kg
European Junior Championships
Gold medal – first place	2005 Zagreb	‍–‍66 kg
Summer Universiade
Bronze medal – third place	2007 Bangkok	‍–‍73 kg
Representing United Arab Emirates
Olympic Games
Bronze medal – third place	2016 Rio de Janeiro	‍–‍81 kg
World Masters
Bronze medal – third place	2015 Rabat	‍–‍81 kg
IJF Grand Slam
Gold medal – first place	2016 Abu Dhabi	‍–‍81 kg
Silver medal – second place	2014 Tokyo	‍–‍81 kg
Silver medal – second place	2015 Abu Dhabi	‍–‍81 kg
Bronze medal – third place	2013 Baku	‍–‍81 kg
Bronze medal – third place	2014 Abu Dhabi	‍–‍81 kg
IJF Grand Prix
Gold medal – first place	2013 Ulaanbaatar	‍–‍81 kg
Gold medal – first place	2013 Qingdao	‍–‍81 kg
Gold medal – first place	2013 Abu Dhabi	‍–‍81 kg
Gold medal – first place	2015 Tashkent	‍–‍81 kg
Silver medal – second place	2015 Samsun	‍–‍81 kg
Bronze medal – third place	2016 Samsun	‍–‍81 kg

Profile at external databases
- IJF: 12580
- JudoInside.com: 33175
- Updated on 24 May 2023

Sergiu Toma (born 29 January 1987) is a Moldovan-born Emirati judoka. He competed for the United Arab Emirates in the 81 kg category at the 2016 Olympic Games and defeated Takanori Nagase to enter the semi-finals. He lost his semi-final match to Khasan Khalmurzaev, but then beat Matteo Marconcini in the bronze medal match. At the 2008 and 2012 Olympics he competed for Moldova but was eliminated in the early rounds.

Toma has a law degree from the Moldova State University. In 2008, he considered retiring from sport due to financial problems. He stayed, and in 2011 was named Moldovan Athlete of the Year. After the 2012 Olympics he moved to the United Arab Emirates, together with five other Moldovan judoka and the national coach Vasile Colta.
