= Kodo Nakano =

Japanese judoka

- Born: March 8, 1993 (age 33); Noda, Iwate, Japan
- Native name: 中野 亨道
- Nationality: Filipino
- Style: Judo

Kodo Nakano (中野 亨道, Nakano Kodo; born March 8, 1993) is a Filipino judoka who participated at the 81 kg event at the 2016 Summer Olympics. He has also participated at the 2013 World Judo Championship in Rio de Janeiro and the 2013 Southeast Asian Games. Nakano won a bronze at the -81 kg event at the Southeast Asia Judo Championships in Naypyidaw, Myanmar.

Nakano was born to a Japanese businessman from Tokyo who has a Filipina wife.
