= Joachim Bottieau =

Belgian judoka (born 1989)

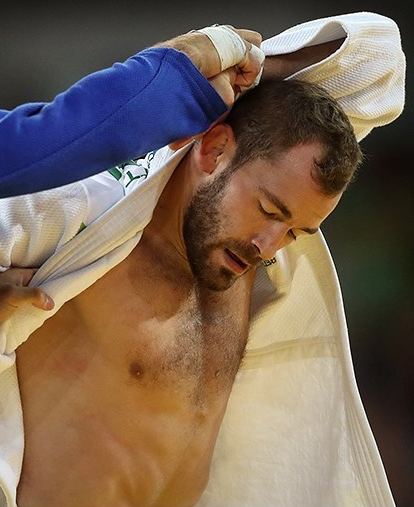
- Bottieau at the 2016 Olympics

Personal information
- Born: 20 March 1989 (age 37) Boussu, Belgium
- Occupation: Judoka
- Height: 180 cm (5 ft 11 in)

Sport
- Country: Belgium
- Sport: Judo
- Weight class: ‍–‍81 kg, ‍–‍90 kg
- Club: Judo Club Grand-Hornu
- Coached by: Yves Bottieau (father); Fabrice Flamand (national)

Achievements and titles
- Olympic Games: R16 (2012)
- World Champ.: 7th (2013)
- European Champ.: (bronze) (2012, 2013)
Medal record
Men's judo
Representing Belgium
European Championships
Bronze medal – third place	2012 Chelyabinsk	‍–‍81 kg
Bronze medal – third place	2013 Budapest	‍–‍81 kg
World Masters
Silver medal – second place	2016 Guadalajara	‍–‍81 kg
IJF Grand Prix
Gold medal – first place	2015 Düsseldorf	‍–‍81 kg
Gold medal – first place	2016 Düsseldorf	‍–‍81 kg
Silver medal – second place	2014 Jeju	‍–‍81 kg
Bronze medal – third place	2016 Samsun	‍–‍81 kg
Bronze medal – third place	2018 Agadir	‍–‍90 kg
European U23 Championships
Bronze medal – third place	2009 Antalya	‍–‍73 kg
Bronze medal – third place	2010 Sarajevo	‍–‍81 kg
European Junior Championships
Bronze medal – third place	2007 Prague	‍–‍73 kg
Bronze medal – third place	2008 Warsaw	‍–‍73 kg
Summer Universiade
Bronze medal – third place	2009 Belgrade	‍–‍73 kg

Profile at external databases
- IJF: 2556
- JudoInside.com: 32427
- Updated on 14 November 2022

Joachim Bottieau (born 20 March 1989) is a Belgian judoka. He competed in the ‍–‍81 kg category at the 2012 Summer Olympics; after defeating Omar Simmonds Pea in the first bout, he was eliminated by Ivan Nifontov in the second bout. At the 2016 Olympics he lost to Matteo Marconcini in the first bout.

Bottieau took up judo aged 12, together with his brothers Jean-Yves and Jeremiah. He is coached by his father, who founded the Grand Hornu Judo Club in 1989. He won bronze medals at the 2012 and 2013 European Championships.
