= Srđan Mrvaljević =

Montenegrin judoka (born 1984)

Personal information
- Nationality: Montenegrin
- Born: 16 May 1984 (age 42) Belgrade, SFR Yugoslavia
- Occupation: Judoka

Sport
- Country: Montenegro
- Sport: Judo
- Weight class: ‍–‍81 kg

Achievements and titles
- Olympic Games: 9th (2008)
- World Champ.: (silver) (2011)
- European Champ.: 7th (2013)
Medal record
Men's judo
Representing Montenegro
World Championships
Silver medal – second place	2011 Paris	‍–‍81 kg
IJF Grand Slam
Bronze medal – third place	2016 Abu Dhabi	‍–‍81 kg
IJF Grand Prix
Bronze medal – third place	2016 Tashkent	‍–‍81 kg
European U23 Championships
Silver medal – second place	2006 Moscow	‍–‍81 kg
European Junior Championships
Gold medal – first place	2003 Sarajevo	‍–‍73 kg
Bronze medal – third place	2002 Rotterdam	‍–‍73 kg
Mediterranean Games
Gold medal – first place	2013 Mersin	‍–‍81 kg
Games of the Small States of Europe
Gold medal – first place	2013 Luxembourg	‍–‍81 kg
Gold medal – first place	2015 Reykjavík	‍–‍81 kg

Profile at external databases
- IJF: 849
- JudoInside.com: 17765
- Updated on 17 July 2023

Srđan Mrvaljević (born 16 May 1984, in Belgrade) is a Montenegrin judoka. He competed in the men's 81 kg event at the 2008 Summer Olympics. In 2011, he was elected "best athlete of Montenegro" by the Montenegrin Olympic Committee. He competed for Montenegro at the 2012 Summer Olympics in the men's 81 kg as well. He also competed at the 2016 Summer Olympics in the men's 81 kg event.
