= Valeriu Duminică =

Moldovan judoka (born 1987)

Personal information
- Born: 8 April 1987 (age 39) Chișinău, Moldavian SSR, Soviet Union
- Occupation: Judoka

Sport
- Country: Moldova
- Sport: Judo
- Weight class: –81 kg

Achievements and titles
- Olympic Games: R16 (2016)
- World Champ.: 7th (2015)
- European Champ.: 5th (2016)
Medal record
Men's judo
Representing Moldova
IJF Grand Prix
Bronze medal – third place	2014 Samsun	–81 kg
European Junior Championships
Silver medal – second place	2005 Zagreb	–73 kg
European Cadet Championships
Bronze medal – third place	2002 Győr	–55 kg

Profile at external databases
- IJF: 884
- JudoInside.com: 25756
- Updated on 17 February 2022

Valeriu Duminică (born April 8, 1987) is a Moldovan judoka. He competed at the 2016 Summer Olympics in the men's 81 kg event, in which he was eliminated in the third round by Matteo Marconcini.
