= Ivan Nifontov =

Russian judoka (born 1987)

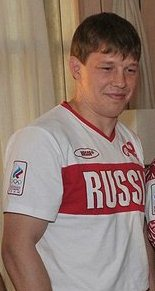

Personal information
- Born: 5 June 1987 (age 39)
- Occupation: Judoka

Sport
- Country: Russia
- Sport: Judo
- Weight class: –81 kg

Achievements and titles
- Olympic Games: (bronze) (2012)
- World Champ.: (2009)
- European Champ.: (gold) (2009)
Medal record
Men's judo
Representing Russia
Olympic Games
Bronze medal – third place	2012 London	‍–‍81 kg
World Championships
Gold medal – first place	2009 Rotterdam	‍–‍81 kg
Silver medal – second place	2013 Rio de Janeiro	Men's team
Bronze medal – third place	2014 Chelyabinsk	‍–‍81 kg
European Games
Silver medal – second place	2015 Baku	‍–‍81 kg
Bronze medal – third place	2015 Baku	Men's team
European Championships
Gold medal – first place	2009 Tbilisi	‍–‍81 kg
Bronze medal – third place	2010 Vienna	Men's team
World Masters
Gold medal – first place	2013 Tyumen	‍–‍81 kg
Silver medal – second place	2015 Rabat	‍–‍81 kg
IJF Grand Slam
Gold medal – first place	2009 Rio de Janeiro	‍–‍81 kg
Gold medal – first place	2010 Moscow	‍–‍81 kg
Gold medal – first place	2014 Abu Dhabi	‍–‍81 kg
Silver medal – second place	2011 Rio de Janeiro	‍–‍81 kg
Bronze medal – third place	2009 Paris	‍–‍81 kg
IJF Grand Prix
Gold medal – first place	2016 Budapest	‍–‍81 kg
Bronze medal – third place	2009 Hamburg	‍–‍81 kg
Bronze medal – third place	2011 Amsterdam	‍–‍81 kg
Bronze medal – third place	2011 Qingdao	‍–‍81 kg

Profile at external databases
- IJF: 360
- JudoInside.com: 30163
- Updated on 25 May 2023

Ivan Vitaliyevich Nifontov (Russian: Иван Витальевич Нифонтов; born 5 June 1987, in Pavlodar) is a Russian judoka. He won the bronze at the 2012 Summer Olympics in the category men's –81 kg. He carried the Winter Olympic torch before the Sochi Games.
