= Travis Stevens =

American judoka (born 1986)

Personal information
- Nationality: (United States) American
- Born: February 28, 1986 (age 40) Bellevue, Washington
- Home town: Wakefield, Massachusetts
- Education: North Shore Community College
- Occupation: Judoka
- Height: 5 ft 11 in (180 cm)

Sport
- Country: United States
- Sport: Judo
- Weight class: –81 kg
- Rank: 6th dan black belt in judo Black belt in BJJ
- Club: Pedro's Judo Center
- Team: NYAC
- Coached by: Jimmy Pedro, James Harai Sr., Jason Morris

Achievements and titles
- Olympic Games: (silver) (2016)
- World Champ.: R16 (2010)
- Pan American Champ.: (gold) (2009)
Medal record
Men's judo
Representing United States
Olympic Games
Silver medal – second place	2016 Rio de Janeiro	‍–‍81 kg
Pan American Games
Gold medal – first place	2007 Rio de Janeiro	‍–‍81 kg
Gold medal – first place	2015 Toronto	‍–‍81 kg
Pan American Championships
Gold medal – first place	2009 Buenos Aires	‍–‍81 kg
Silver medal – second place	2008 Miami	‍–‍81 kg
Silver medal – second place	2011 Guadalajara	‍–‍81 kg
Silver medal – second place	2016 Havana	‍–‍81 kg
Bronze medal – third place	2010 San Salvador	‍–‍81 kg
Bronze medal – third place	2013 San José	‍–‍81 kg
Bronze medal – third place	2014 Guayaquil	‍–‍81 kg
Bronze medal – third place	2015 Edmonton	‍–‍81 kg
World Masters
Gold medal – first place	2016 Guadalajara	‍–‍81 kg
IJF Grand Slam
Silver medal – second place	2011 Moscow	‍–‍81 kg
Silver medal – second place	2012 Rio de Janeiro	‍–‍81 kg
Bronze medal – third place	2009 Rio de Janeiro	‍–‍81 kg
Bronze medal – third place	2010 Paris	‍–‍81 kg
IJF Grand Prix
Gold medal – first place	2011 Düsseldorf	‍–‍81 kg
Gold medal – first place	2013 Tashkent	‍–‍81 kg
Gold medal – first place	2014 Düsseldorf	‍–‍81 kg
Silver medal – second place	2014 Tbilisi	‍–‍81 kg
Silver medal – second place	2014 Havana	‍–‍81 kg
Silver medal – second place	2014 Zagreb	‍–‍81 kg
Silver medal – second place	2016 Havana	‍–‍81 kg
Bronze medal – third place	2010 Qingdao	‍–‍81 kg
Bronze medal – third place	2011 Abu Dhabi	‍–‍81 kg

Profile at external databases
- IJF: 46
- JudoInside.com: 31828
- Updated on 24 May 2023

Travis Stevens (born February 28, 1986) is an American judoka who competed in the 2008, 2012, and 2016 Summer Olympics. He competes in the men's half-middleweight (−81 kg) division. On August 9, 2016, Stevens became the third American male judoka to win a silver medal in the Olympics.

Stevens also holds a black belt in Brazilian jiu-jitsu under John Danaher and Renzo Gracie, which Danaher awarded on November 19, 2013.

== Judo career ==
At the 2008 Summer Olympics, he lost to eventual gold medalist Ole Bischof in the third round, before losing to Tiago Camilo in the repechage.

At the 2012 Summer Olympics, he again lost to 2008 gold medalist Ole Bischof, this time in the semi-finals by judges' decision. Stevens was then beaten in the bronze medal match by Canada's Antoine Valois-Fortier.

At the 2016 Summer Olympics, he lost to Khasan Khalmurzaev (Russia) in the finals, earning a silver medal. On 9 August 2016, he was ranked number 12 in the world in the −81 kg weight class by the International Judo Federation.

Stevens primarily teaches out of FUJI Gym in Wakefield, Massachusetts, which he opened on January 12, 2013.
