= Konstantīns Ovčiņņikovs =

Latvian judoka (born 1983)

Personal information
- Born: 10 November 1983 (age 42)
- Occupation: Judoka

Sport
- Country: Latvia
- Sport: Judo
- Weight class: –81 kg

Achievements and titles
- Olympic Games: R32 (2012)
- World Champ.: R32 (2009)
- European Champ.: (bronze) (2012)
Medal record
Men's judo
Representing Latvia
European Championships
Bronze medal – third place	2012 Chelyabinsk	–81 kg
European Junior Championships
Silver medal – second place	2001 Budapest	–81 kg
Silver medal – second place	2002 Rotterdam	–81 kg

Profile at external databases
- IJF: 564
- JudoInside.com: 14270
- Updated on 14 February 2022

Konstantīns Ovčiņņikovs (born 10 November 1983 in Frunze) is a Latvian judoka.

== Achievements ==
Year	Tournament	Place	Weight class
2012	European Championships	3rd	Half middleweight (–81 kg)
2008	European Championships	5th	Half middleweight (–81 kg)
