= 2013 World Judo Championships – Men's 90 kg =

Judo competition

Judo Men's 90 kg at the 2013 World Judo Championships
- Venue: Ginásio do Maracanãzinho
- Location: Rio de Janeiro, Brazil
- Date: 30 August 2013
- Competitors: 61 from 48 nations

Medalists
gold medal	Asley González (1st title)	Cuba
silver medal	Varlam Liparteliani	Georgia
bronze medal	Ilias Iliadis	Greece
bronze medal	Kirill Denisov	Russia

Competition at external databases
- Links: IJF • JudoInside

The men's 90 kg competition of the 2013 World Judo Championships was held on August 30.

== Medalists ==
Gold	Silver	Bronze
Asley González (CUB)	Varlam Liparteliani (GEO)	Ilias Iliadis (GRE); Kirill Denisov (RUS)

== Results ==
=== Pool A ===
First Round
(France) Ludovic Gobert	100
(Venezuela) Mervin Rodriguez	000
(Angola) Casimiro Bento	000
(Uzbekistan) Erkin Doniyorov	100
(Germany) Marc Odenthal	100
(Zimbabwe) Tatenda Guta	000
(Czech Republic) Alexandr Jurečka	100
(Mongolia) Khutag Tsogtgerel	001
(Spain) David Ruiz Zajac	100
(Netherlands) Noel Van T End	010
(Italy) Walter Facente	001
(United Arab Emirates) Mihail Marchitan	101
(Sweden) Joakim Dvarby	100
(Brazil) Eduardo Santos	000

Quarterfinals
(Georgia (country)) Varlam Liparteliani	010
(France) Ludovic Gobert	000
(Uzbekistan) Erkin Doniyorov	000
(Germany) Marc Odenthal	100
(Czech Republic) Alexandr Jurečka	100
(Spain) David Ruiz Zajac	001
(United Arab Emirates) Mihail Marchitan	000
(Sweden) Joakim Dvarby	100

Semifinals
(Georgia (country)) Varlam Liparteliani	100
(Germany) Marc Odenthal	000
(Czech Republic) Alexandr Jurečka	000
(Sweden) Joakim Dvarby	001

Final
(Georgia (country)) Varlam Liparteliani	100
(Sweden) Joakim Dvarby	000

=== Pool B ===
First Round
(Russia) Kirill Denisov	100
(United States) Colton Brown	000
(Dominican Republic) Cristian Gomera	000
(Switzerland) Ciril Grossklaus	100
(Algeria) Abderahmane Benamadi	000
(South Korea) Lee Kyu-Won	000
(Bolivia) Martín Michel	000
(Cuba) Yeslandis Echemendia	100
(Russia) Grigorii Sulemin	000
(Australia) Sebastian Temesi	000
(Portugal) Celio Dias	100
(Egypt) Hatem Abd el Akher	000
(Uruguay) Pablo Aprahamian	000
(Argentina) Cristian Schmidt	110
(Ukraine) Valentyn Grekov	100
(Tajikistan) Parviz Sobirov	000

Quarterfinals
(Russia) Kirill Denisov	101
(Switzerland) Ciril Grossklaus	000
(South Korea) Lee Kyu-Won	010
(Cuba) Yeslandis Echemendia	000
(Russia) Grigorii Sulemin	000
(Portugal) Celio Dias	001
(Argentina) Cristian Schmidt	000
(Ukraine) Valentyn Grekov	100

Semifinals
(Russia) Kirill Denisov	100
(South Korea) Lee Kyu-Won	000
(Portugal) Celio Dias	011
(Ukraine) Valentyn Grekov	000

Final
(Russia) Kirill Denisov	102
(Portugal) Celio Dias	001

=== Pool C ===
First Round
(Gabon) Luc Manongho	000
(Serbia) Aleksandar Kukolj	101
(Latvia) Aigars Milenbergs	000
(South Korea) Gwak Dong-Han	000
(Ukraine) Quedjau Nhabali	100
(Canada) Alexandre Émond	000
(Azerbaijan) Shahin Gahramanov	100
(Australia) Mark Anthony	000
(United States) Jacob Larsen	100
(Argentina) Alexis Duarte	000
(Cameroon) Dieudonne Dolassem	000
(Jordan) Ibrahim Khalaf	100
(Hungary) Krisztián Tóth	102
(Uruguay) Juan Romero	000

Quarterfinals
(Cuba) Asley González	100
(Serbia) Aleksandar Kukolj	000
(South Korea) Gwak Dong-Han	110
(Ukraine) Quedjau Nhabali	000
(Azerbaijan) Shahin Gahramanov	101
(United States) Jacob Larsen	000
(Jordan) Ibrahim Khalaf	000
(Hungary) Krisztián Tóth	100

Semifinals
(Cuba) Asley González	100
(South Korea) Gwak Dong-Han	000
(Azerbaijan) Shahin Gahramanov	010
(Hungary) Krisztián Tóth	100

Final
(Cuba) Asley González	010
(Hungary) Krisztián Tóth	000

=== Pool D ===
First Round
(Greece) Ilias Iliadis	100
(Slovakia) Milan Randl	000
(Netherlands) Guillaume Elmont	000
(United Arab Emirates) Valeriu Chisca	000
(Kuwait) Ghanam Aldikan	000
(Kyrgyzstan) Chingiz Mamedov	000
(Angola) Henrique João	010
(Dominican Republic) Amado Santos	000
(Japan) Masashi Nishiyama	100
(New Zealand) Ryan Dill-Russell	000
(Kazakhstan) Islam Bozbayev	110
(Democratic Republic of the Congo) Popole Misenga	000
(Honduras) Osman Sánchez	000
(Portugal) Tiago Rodrigues	000
(Lithuania) Karolis Bauža	100
(Ivory Coast) Kinapeya Kone	000

Quarterfinals
(Greece) Ilias Iliadis	010
(Netherlands) Guillaume Elmont	000
(Kyrgyzstan) Chingiz Mamedov	101
(Angola) Henrique João	000
(Japan) Masashi Nishiyama	000
(Kazakhstan) Islam Bozbayev	100
(Portugal) Tiago Rodrigues	000
(Lithuania) Karolis Bauža	100

Semifinals
(Greece) Ilias Iliadis	100
(Kyrgyzstan) Chingiz Mamedov	000
(Kazakhstan) Islam Bozbayev	001
(Lithuania) Karolis Bauža	110

Final
(Greece) Ilias Iliadis	100
(Lithuania) Karolis Bauža	000

=== Finals ===
Semi-finals
(Georgia (country)) Varlam Liparteliani	100
(Russia) Kirill Denisov	000
(Cuba) Asley González	100
(Greece) Ilias Iliadis	000

Final
(Georgia (country)) Varlam Liparteliani	000
(Cuba) Asley González	000

=== Repechage ===
Repechage		Third place
(Sweden) Joakim Dvarby	100
(Portugal) Celio Dias	000	(Sweden) Joakim Dvarby	000
		(Russia) Kirill Denisov	101

Repechage		Third place
(Hungary) Krisztián Tóth	010
(Lithuania) Karolis Bauža	000	(Hungary) Krisztián Tóth	000
		(Greece) Ilias Iliadis	100
