= 2010 World Judo Championships – Men's 90 kg =

Judo competition

Judo Men's 90 kg at the 2010 World Judo Championships
- Venue: Yoyogi National Gymnasium
- Location: Tokyo, Japan
- Date: 10 September 2010
- Competitors: 59 from 42 nations

Medalists
gold medal	Ilias Iliadis (1st title)	Greece
silver medal	Daiki Nishiyama	Japan
bronze medal	Elkhan Mammadov	Azerbaijan
bronze medal	Kirill Denisov	Russia

Competition at external databases
- Links: IJF • JudoInside

The Men's -90 kg competition at the 2010 World Judo Championships was held at 10 September at the Yoyogi National Gymnasium in Tokyo, Japan. 59 competitors contested for the medals, being split in 4 Pools where the winner advanced to the medal round.

== Pool A ==
First Round
(Japan) Takashi Ono	011
(Ukraine) Roman Gontiuk	010
(Greece) Ilias Iliadis	100
(Serbia) Nikola Milošević	000
(United Kingdom) Michael Horley	001
(Georgia (country)) Mindia Bodaveli	100
(Brazil) Tiago Camilo	020
(Morocco) Mohamed Elassri	000
(South Korea) Kwon Young-Woo	000
(Uzbekistan) Khurshid Nabiev	001
(Vanuatu) Nicolas Monvoisin	000
(Hungary) Tamas Madarasz	020

Quarterfinals
(Japan) Takashi Ono	100
(South Africa) Patrick Trezise	000
(Greece) Ilias Iliadis	010
(Georgia (country)) Mindia Bodaveli	000
(Brazil) Tiago Camilo	101
(Uzbekistan) Khurshid Nabiev	000
(Kazakhstan) Timur Bolat	002
(Hungary) Tamas Madarasz	000

Semifinals
(Japan) Takashi Ono	000
(Greece) Ilias Iliadis	001
(Brazil) Tiago Camilo	020
(Kazakhstan) Timur Bolat	000

Final
(Greece) Ilias Iliadis	100
(Brazil) Tiago Camilo	001

== Pool B ==
First Round
(Russia) Kirill Denisov	010
(Mongolia) Ariun-Erdene Batbayar	000
(Poland) Lukasz Kolesnik	000
(Sweden) Marcus Nyman	100
(Spain) David Alarza	100
(Paraguay) Alfredo Sotelo	000
(Italy) Lorenzo Bagnoli	012
(Algeria) Lyes Bouyakoub	011
(Azerbaijan) Elkhan Mammadov	020
(Cyprus) Aleksandar Manev	000
(Kyrgyzstan) Chingiz Mamedov	011
(Australia) Priscus Fogagnolo	001
(Turkmenistan) Kuvvat Nuryyev	000
(United States) Jacob Larsen	101

Quarterfinals
(Russia) Kirill Denisov	001
(Sweden) Marcus Nyman	000
(Spain) David Alarza	002
(Italy) Lorenzo Bagnoli	100
(Azerbaijan) Elkhan Mammadov	101
(Kyrgyzstan) Chingiz Mamedov	000
(United States) Jacob Larsen	000
(Argentina) Hector Campos	100

Semifinals
(Russia) Kirill Denisov	101
(Italy) Lorenzo Bagnoli	000
(Azerbaijan) Elkhan Mammadov	100
(Argentina) Hector Campos	000

Final
(Russia) Kirill Denisov	000
(Azerbaijan) Elkhan Mammadov	110

== Pool C ==
First Round
(Uzbekistan) Dilshod Choriev	000
(Lithuania) Karolis Bauza	014
(Chinese Taipei) Tseng Han-Chieh	012
(Australia) Mark Anthony	001
(Argentina) Diego Rosati	001
(Hungary) Levente Ledenyi	100
(Qatar) Reda Nafwa	000
(Ukraine) Valentyn Grekov	101
(Georgia (country)) Varlam Liparteliani	100
(India) Sahil Pathania	000
(United Kingdom) Winston Gordon	111
(Thailand) Wuttikrai Srisoprap	00
(Poland) Krzysztof Węglarz	000
(Cuba) Asley Gonzalez	101

Quarterfinals
(Lithuania) Karolis Bauza	003
(Chinese Taipei) Tseng Han-Chieh	000
(Hungary) Levente Ledenyi	000
(Ukraine) Valentyn Grekov	100
(Georgia (country)) Varlam Liparteliani	100
(United Kingdom) Winston Gordon	000
(Cuba) Asley Gonzalez	011
(Russia) Murat Gasiev	000

Semifinals
(Lithuania) Karolis Bauza	000
(Ukraine) Valentyn Grekov	110
(Georgia (country)) Varlam Liparteliani	100
(Cuba) Asley Gonzalez	001

Final
(Ukraine) Valentyn Grekov	000
(Georgia (country)) Varlam Liparteliani	012

== Pool D ==
First Round
(Brazil) Hugo Pessanha	011
(Latvia) Aigars Milenbergs	000
(South Korea) Lee Kyu-Won	000
(Austria) Max Schirnhofer	020
(Switzerland) Dominique Hischier	000
(Algeria) Amar Benikhlef	001
(Japan) Daiki Nishiyama	100
(United States) Garry St. Leger	000
(Mongolia) Erdenebilegiin Enkhbat	021
(Greece) Michail Pavlis	000
(Slovakia) Milan Randl	000
(Canada) Alexandre Emond	100
(Paraguay) Martin Sitjar	000
(Belarus) Andrei Kazusionak	100

Quarterfinals
(Brazil) Hugo Pessanha	001
(France) Romain Buffet	003
(Austria) Max Schirnhofer	102
(Algeria) Amar Benikhlef	000
(Japan) Daiki Nishiyama	020
(Mongolia) Erdenebilegiin Enkhbat	001
(Canada) Alexandre Emond	110
(Belarus) Andrei Kazusionak	001

Semifinals
(France) Romain Buffet	001
(Austria) Max Schirnhofer	110
(Japan) Daiki Nishiyama	101
(Canada) Alexandre Emond	000

Final
(Austria) Max Schirnhofer	000
(Japan) Daiki Nishiyama	000

== Repechage ==
Repechage		Third place
(Brazil) Tiago Camilo	000
(Russia) Kirill Denisov	100	(Russia) Kirill Denisov	010
		(Georgia (country)) Varlam Liparteliani	001

Repechage		Third place
(Ukraine) Valentyn Grekov	010
(Austria) Max Schirnhofer	001	(Ukraine) Valentyn Grekov	000
		(Azerbaijan) Elkhan Mammadov	022

== Finals ==
Semi-finals
(Greece) Ilias Iliadis	100
(Azerbaijan) Elkhan Mammadov	000
(Georgia (country)) Varlam Liparteliani	000
(Japan) Daiki Nishiyama	001

Final
(Greece) Ilias Iliadis	100
(Japan) Daiki Nishiyama	000
