= Academic Bowl (college football) =

American college football rivalry between Case Western Reserve and Carnegie Mellon

- Teams: Case Western Reserve Spartans; Carnegie Mellon Tartans
- First meeting: September 20, 1986; Case Western Reserve 21, Carnegie Mellon 14
- Latest meeting: November 16, 2024; Carnegie Mellon 37, Case Western Reserve 30
- Next meeting: TBD
- Stadiums: Gesling Stadium, DiSanto Field
- Trophy: Academic Bowl Trophy

Statistics
- Total meetings: 38
- All-time series: Carnegie Mellon leads, 23–15
- Largest victory: Carnegie Mellon 56, Case Western Reserve 0 (1993)
- Longest win streak: Case Western Reserve, 8 (2007–2014)
- Current win streak: Carnegie Mellon, 6 (2018–present)
- Locations of the two schools.

The Academic Bowl is an annual rivalry football game and trophy between the Spartans of Case Western Reserve University and Tartans of Carnegie Mellon University.

Predating the Academic Bowl trophy name, Carnegie Tech first played Case Tech in 1907 and Western Reserve in 1909, meeting up multiple times over the next few decades. Upon the merger of Case Tech and Western Reserve, the match-up resumed in 1970. It was not until 1986 when the Academic Bowl was officially created. The match-up mirrors the sports rivalry between the two cities of Cleveland and Pittsburgh.

The Academic Bowl emphasizes “Commitment to Academic and Athletic Excellence,” as both universities are often ranked scholastically among the top in the nation, especially as research universities.

Coach Rich Lackner coached the Tartans in the first 34 games of the rivalry, achieving a 19–15 record. He was succeeded by Ryan Larsen, who is undefeated in the rivalry. For Case Western Reserve, Coach Greg Debeljak carries a 10–11 record, including the longest winning streak at eight games.

In 2024, Carnegie Mellon announced it would be moving to the Centennial Conference, whereas Case Western remained in the Presidents' Athletic Conference. No deal was struck to continue the rivalry with an out-of-conference game, and the rivalry was put on hold.

== Game results ==
Case Western Reserve victories	Carnegie Mellon victories

No.	Date	Location	Winner	Score
1	1986	Cleveland	Case Western Reserve	21–14
2	1987	Pittsburgh	Carnegie Mellon	13–12
3	1988	Cleveland	Case Western Reserve	32–22
4	1989	Pittsburgh	Carnegie Mellon	48–14
5	1990	Cleveland	Carnegie Mellon	42–17
6	1991	Pittsburgh	Carnegie Mellon	43–0
7	1992	Cleveland	Carnegie Mellon	33–14
8	1993	Pittsburgh	Carnegie Mellon	56–0
9	1994	Cleveland	Carnegie Mellon	50–8
10	1995	Pittsburgh	Case Western Reserve	3–0
11	1996	Cleveland	Case Western Reserve	16–0
12	1997	Pittsburgh	Carnegie Mellon	16–7
13	1998	Cleveland	Carnegie Mellon	14–7
14	1999	Pittsburgh	Carnegie Mellon	42–0
15	2000	Cleveland	Carnegie Mellon	45–14
16	2001	Pittsburgh	Carnegie Mellon	42–14
17	2002	Cleveland	Case Western Reserve	42–35
18	2003	Pittsburgh	Carnegie Mellon	44–16
19	2004	Cleveland	Case Western Reserve	24–14
20	2005	Pittsburgh	Carnegie Mellon	23–20

No.	Date	Location	Winner	Score
21	2006	Cleveland	Carnegie Mellon	20–10
22	2007	Pittsburgh	Case Western Reserve	20–17
23	2008	Cleveland	Case Western Reserve	38–13
24	2009	Pittsburgh	Case Western Reserve	34–17
25	2010	Cleveland	Case Western Reserve	28–0
26	2011	Pittsburgh	Case Western Reserve	38–24
27	2012	Cleveland	Case Western Reserve	36–24
28	2013	Pittsburgh	Case Western Reserve	35–32
29	2014	Cleveland	Case Western Reserve	30–0
30	2015	Pittsburgh	Carnegie Mellon	52–42
31	2016	Cleveland	Carnegie Mellon	26–21
32	2017	Pittsburgh	Case Western Reserve	41–34
33	2018	Cleveland	Carnegie Mellon	29–23
34	2019	Pittsburgh	Carnegie Mellon	24–21
35	2021	Pittsburgh	Carnegie Mellon	24–6
36	2022	Cleveland	Carnegie Mellon	20–7
37	2023	Pittsburgh	Carnegie Mellon	31–21
38	2024	Cleveland	Carnegie Mellon	37–30
Series: Carnegie Mellon leads 23–15

== See also ==
- Browns–Steelers rivalry
- List of NCAA college football rivalry games
