= Judo at the 2010 Asian Games – Men's 90 kg =

Judo competition

Men's 90 kg at the 2010 Asian Games
- Venue: Huagong Gymnasium
- Date: 14 November 2010
- Competitors: 18 from 18 nations

Medalists
gold medal	Takashi Ono	Japan
silver medal	Dilshod Choriev	Uzbekistan
bronze medal	Tseng Han-chieh	Chinese Taipei
bronze medal	Lee Kyu-won	South Korea

The men's 90 kilograms (middleweight) competition at the 2010 Asian Games in Guangzhou was held on 14 November at the Huagong Gymnasium.

== Schedule ==
All times are China Standard Time (UTC+08:00)

Date	Time	Event
Sunday, 14 November 2010	10:00	Preliminary 1
Sunday, 14 November 2010	10:00	Preliminary 2
Sunday, 14 November 2010	10:00	Quarterfinals
Sunday, 14 November 2010	15:00	Final of repechage
Sunday, 14 November 2010	15:00	Final of table
Sunday, 14 November 2010	15:00	Finals

== Results ==
=== Main bracket ===
==== Final ====
Gold medal
Takashi Ono (JPN)	100
Dilshod Choriev (UZB)	000

==== Top half ====
Preliminary 1
Timur Bolat (KAZ)	100
Abdullah Al-Otaibi (IOC)	000

Preliminary 2
Takashi Ono (JPN)	100
Muzafar Iqbal (PAK)	000
Tseng Han-chieh (TPE)	100
Sherali Bozorov (TJK)	000
Timur Bolat (KAZ)	100
Sahil Pathania (IND)	000
Chingiz Mamedov (KGZ)	100
Wuttikrai Srisoprap (THA)	000

Quarterfinals
Takashi Ono (JPN)	001
Tseng Han-chieh (TPE)	000
Timur Bolat (KAZ)	020
Chingiz Mamedov (KGZ)	010

Final of table
Takashi Ono (JPN)	100
Timur Bolat (KAZ)	000

==== Bottom half ====
Preliminary 1
Lee Kyu-won (KOR)	100
Hossein Ghomi (IRI)	000

Preliminary 2
Dilshod Choriev (UZB)	100
Awad Naemi (QAT)	000
He Yanzhu (CHN)	002
Jad Fadel (LIB)	100
Lee Kyu-won (KOR)	100
Kuwwat Nuryýew (TKM)	000
Erdenebilegiin Enkhbat (MGL)	102
Phengsy Phonepaseud (LAO)	000

Quarterfinals
Dilshod Choriev (UZB)	101
Jad Fadel (LIB)	000
Lee Kyu-won (KOR)	001
Erdenebilegiin Enkhbat (MGL)	002

Final of table
Dilshod Choriev (UZB)	100
Erdenebilegiin Enkhbat (MGL)	000

=== Repechage ===
Final of repechage
Tseng Han-chieh (TPE)	100
Chingiz Mamedov (KGZ)	000
Jad Fadel (LIB)	000
Lee Kyu-won (KOR)	111

Bronze medals
Tseng Han-chieh (TPE)	100
Erdenebilegiin Enkhbat (MGL)	000
Lee Kyu-won (KOR)	100
Timur Bolat (KAZ)	000
