= Judo at the 2011 Pan American Games – Men's 90 kg =

Men's 90 kg at the 2011 Pan American Games
- Venue: CODE II Gymnasium
- Dates: October 27
- Competitors: 9 from 9 nations

Medalists
Gold medal	Tiago Camilo	Brazil
Silver medal	Asley Gonzalez	Cuba
Bronze medal	Alexandre Emond	Canada
Bronze medal	Isao Cardenas	Mexico

The men's 90 kg competition of the judo events at the 2011 Pan American Games in Guadalajara, Mexico, was held on October 27 at the CODE II Gymanasium. The defending champion was Tiago Camilo of Brazil.

== Schedule ==
All times are Central Standard Time (UTC-6).

Date	Time	Round
October 27, 2011	11:00	Preliminary bout
October 27, 2011	11:24	Quarterfinals
October 27, 2011	13:32	Semifinals
October 27, 2011	14:04	Repechage
October 27, 2011	18:12	Bronze medal matches
October 27, 2011	18:28	Final

== Results ==
Legend

- 1st number = Ippon
- 2nd number = Waza-ari
- 3rd number = Yuko

=== Bracket ===
Preliminaries
Oscar Ladino (COL)	000
Rafael Romo (CHI)	100

Quarter Finals
Tiago Camilo (BRA)	120
Alexandre Emond (CAN)	000
Jose Camacho (VEN)	010
Isao Cardenas (MEX)	002
Hector Campos (ARG)	100
Ryan Larsen (USA)	010
Asley Gonzalez (CUB)	101
Rafael Romo (CHI)	000

Semi Finals
Tiago Camilo (BRA)	100
Isao Cardenas (MEX)	000
Ryan Larsen (USA)	000
Asley Gonzalez (CUB)	121

Final
Tiago Camilo (BRA)	100
Asley Gonzalez (CUB)	000

=== Repechage round ===
Two bronze medals were awarded.

Semifinals
Alexandre Emond (CAN)	100
Jose Camacho (VEN)	010
Hector Campos (ARG)	000
Rafael Romo (CHI)	100

Finals
Alexandre Emond (CAN)	100
Ryan Larsen (USA)	000
Isao Cardenas (MEX)	101
Rafael Romo (CHI)	000
