= Carnegie Mellon Tartans football =

University football team

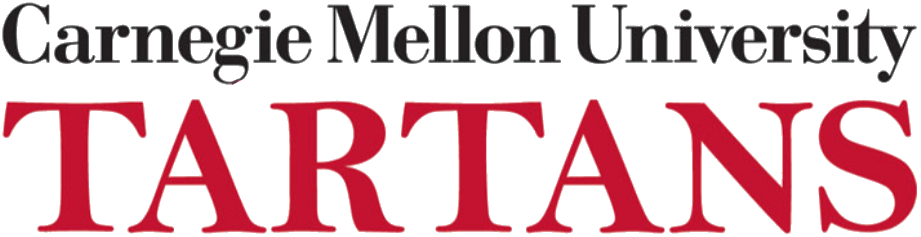
- First season: 1906; 120 years ago
- Head coach: Ryan Larsen; 4th season, 37–9 (.804)
- Location: Pittsburgh, Pennsylvania
- Stadium: Gesling Stadium (capacity: 3,900)
- NCAA division: Division III
- Conference: Centennial
- Division: UAA (1990–2017); PAC (1968–1989); WPC (1958–1967); Independent (1906–1957)
- Colors: Crimson, Black, and Grey
- All-time record: 580–408–28 (.585)

Conference championships
- 18
- Consensus All-Americans: 61
- Rivalries: Case Western Reserve Spartans (rivalry); Grove City Wolverines; Westminster Titans
- Mascot: Scottie Dog
- Marching band: Kiltie Band
- Website: athletics.cmu.edu/football

The Carnegie Mellon Tartans football team represents Carnegie Mellon University in National Collegiate Athletic Association (NCAA) Division III competition. Ryan Larsen is the head coach and has served since 2022.

== History ==
=== Foundation and early history ===
The Carnegie Tech Tartan football team was founded ahead of the 1906 football season, where they competed as independents. In their first year of football, the Tartans claimed a modest record of 2-3-2. The Carnegie Tech football program continued to have an unconvincing start, as they accumulated a 4-15 record across the 1907 and 1908 seasons. This negative trend reversed, however, in 1909 as the Tartans posted their first ever winning record by finishing 5-3-1 under first year head coach Edwin N. Snitjer.

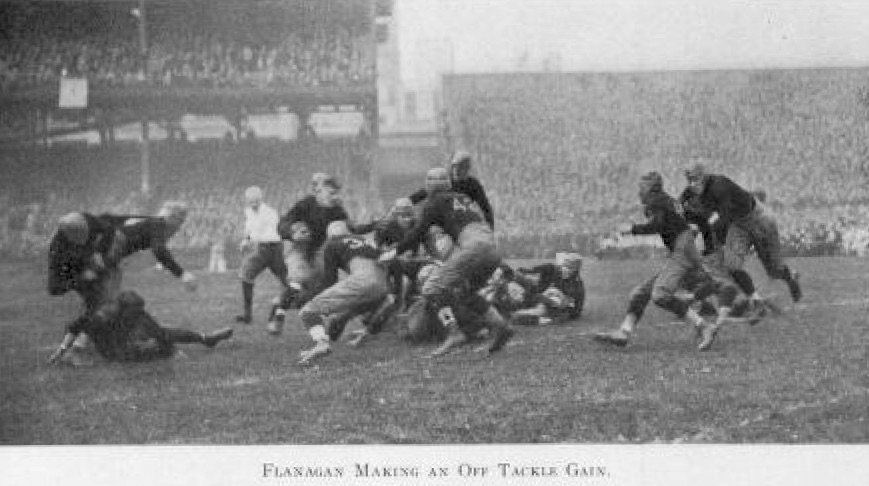
William Flanagan gaining yardage in the 1923 Pitt versus Carnegie Tech game

The 1910s were a decade of mediocrity, with the Tartans regularly finishing close to the .500 mark; however, by the 1920s, Carnegie Tech had become a national contender and regional powerhouse, posting a record of 34-20-4 in the decade. This includes a 1928 season, in which the Tartans finished the season ranked number 6 in nation by the AP poll.

On November 28, 1926, the 6–2 Carnegie Tech football team shut out Knute Rockne's undefeated Notre Dame Fighting Irish 19–0 at Forbes Field. It was the only loss for the Irish that season and only the second time they allowed a touchdown. The game was ranked the fourth-greatest upset in college football history by ESPN.

=== The 1930s: a bowl game and high AP rankings ===
In the 1930s, Carnegie Tech (as it was known then) was among the top college football programs in the country. In 1938 and 1939, the team achieved national rankings in the AP poll. Ranked sixth at the end of the 1938 regular season, the Tartans earned a January bowl game invitation, but lost 15–7 to top-ranked TCU in the Sugar Bowl in New Orleans.

Carnegie Tech's AP ranking history:

- No. 13 – October 17, 1938
- No. 16 – October 24, 1938
- No. 19 – October 31, 1938
- No. 6 – November 7, 1938
- No. 6 – November 14, 1938
- No. 7 – November 21, 1938
- No. 6 – November 28, 1938
- No. 6 – December 5, 1938 (final)
- No. 15 – October 16, 1939

=== Decline and resurgence ===
The team lost 26 straight games from 1942 through 1948 (the 1944 and 1945 seasons were cancelled due to World War II). In the last game of the 1948 season, the team beat Grove City, 7–0, on a 51-yard touchdown run by freshman halfback John Luchok. The team improved over the next six years, culminating in the first undefeated season in school history in 1954. That team was led by quarterback Guy Carricato, halfback Eddy Miller and end Chuck Luchok, John Luchok's younger brother.

=== The Joe Gasparella era ===
In 1963, Carnegie Tech hired former Pittsburgh Steelers quarterback Joe Gasparella as their head coach. Despite Gasparella's professional pedigree, the Tartans struggled under his leadership, only posting three winning seasons in the twelve years he was head coach. His final career record as head coach of the Tartan football team was 45-60-1 at the time of his retirement in 1975.

Despite the unremarkable nature of Gasparella's record on the gridiron, his tenure as head coach was anything but. The Gasparella era was one that was marked by tremendous change and upheaval for the Tartans. Firstly, Gasparella oversaw the football team at the time of the Carnegie Tech-Mellon institute merger in 1967. This merger gave Gasparella and the Tartans a wider recruiting net, allowing Carnegie Mellon to attract athletes interested in both the sciences and the humanities.

In 1968, Gasparella affirmed and supported Carnegie Mellon's first move into the Presidents' Athletic Conference. In the PAC, the Tartans performed marginally better than they had previously, regularly finishing around .500 in the middle of the conference.

In 1973, when the NCAA split up sports into three divisions, Carnegie Mellon moved with the rest of the PAC into Division III of college football. Gasparella posted a 13-11 record in his three seasons in Division III. Following a 5-3 season in 1975, where the Tartans finished third in the PAC, Gasparella retired from coaching football at the age of 48.

=== The Chuck Klausing era ===
Following Gasparella's departure, Carnegie Mellon hired Indiana University head coach Chuck Klausing. Klausing coached the Tartans for nine seasons and never posted a losing record. Under Klausing, the Tartans were a dominant powerhouse in the northeast. His all-time record as head coach of the Tartans was 77-15-2. Including his time at IUP, Klausing had a record of 124-25-2, making him the nineteenth winningest coach in college football history.

In just his second season as Carnegie Mellon's head coach, Klausing lead the Tartans to their first ever PAC football championship in 1977. Klausing followed that up with a three-peat, winning PAC championships in 1978 and 1979. The 1978 and 1979 seasons also featured division III playoff berths, where the Tartans reached the semifinal rounds in both years. The 1979 team posted a record of 10-1, and was awarded the Lambert Trophy, which is awarded to the best college football team in the East.

After the Carnegie Mellon's three-peat, the Klausing-lead Tartans won three more conference championships in 1981, 1983, and 1985 and made two more Division III playoff appearances. The 1983 team finished the regular season ranked #2 in the nation, the highest ranking ever awarded to a Carnegie Mellon football team.

Following a loss in the first round of the 1985 playoffs, Klausing departed from the Tartans to coach for a season at the University of Pittsburgh, before returning to his original passion of coaching high school football until his retirement in 1993. In 1998, Klausing was inducted into the College Football Hall of Fame.

=== The Rich Lackner era ===
Following the departure of Klausing, the Tartans promoted assistant coach Rich Lackner to head coach. A Pittsburgh native, Lackner played linebacker for the Tartans from 1975-78. While at Carnegie Mellon, Lackner earned all-PAC honors three times, academic all-American honors twice, and was named the 1976 Presidents' Athletic Conference Defensive Player of the Year. In 1979, Lackner graduated from Carnegie Mellon with an undergraduate degree in history and was immediately retained by Coach Klausing as an assistant on his staff.

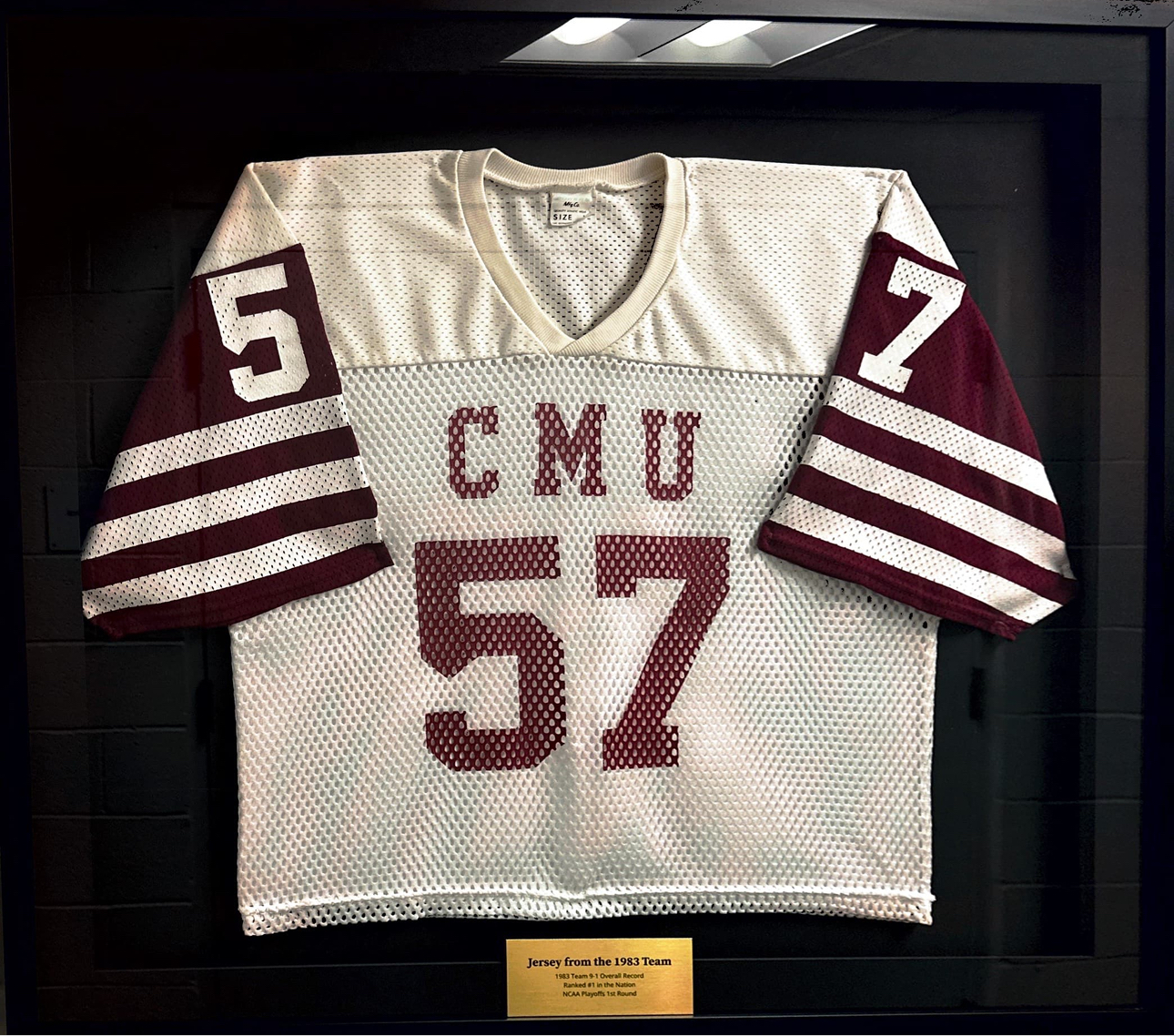
1983 Carnegie Mellon football jersey

In 1986, Lackner was officially named head coach. Under Lackner's leadership, the Tartans claimed nine conference championships and three Division III playoff berths. The Tartans posted an impressive 234-125-2 record under Lackner, marked by a dominant run in the 1990s.

In 1990, the Tartans moved to the University Athletic Association, where Carnegie Mellon rose to newfound prominence. The Tartans won conference championships seven out of their first eight seasons in the UAA, including five straight from 1993-97. Lackner was named the UAA Coach of the Year five times, in 1990, 1991, 1993, 1997 and 2006.

On September 19, 1998, Lackner passed Walter Steffen, who guided Carnegie Tech to an 88–53–8 mark from 1914 to 1932, as the winningest coach in school history, when the Tartans defeated Bethany College, 38–7.

In 2006, the Lackner-lead Tartans posted an 11–1 season, the most wins in school history and their sixth appearance in the NCAA playoffs. The 2006 team was the first team in UAA conference history to win an NCAA playoff game with a 21–0 shutout of Millsaps College of the SCAC conference.

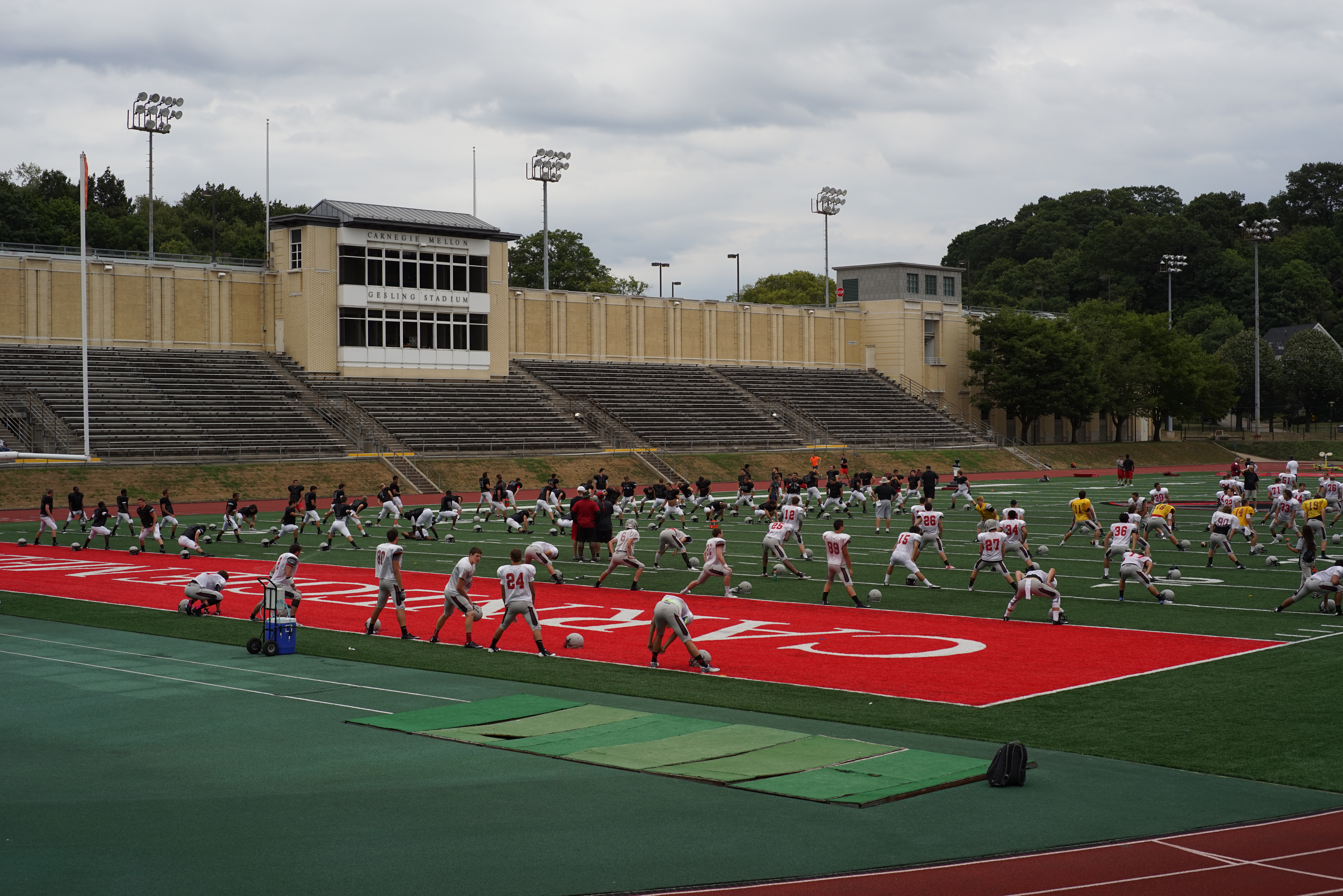
The Tartans warm up before practice at Gesling Stadium in 2015

In 2015, runningback Sam Benger lead all of college football with 2,092 yards on the season. Second place was 504 yards behind him. He was just the twenty-first player in Division 3 football history to exceed 2,000 yards. In 2017, Benger was inducted into the national football foundation hall of fame.

In 2019, Carnegie Mellon linebacker and long snapper Brian Khoury was signed to the DC Defenders of the XFL. Khoury went on to have an NFL career with the New England Patriots and Baltimore Ravens.

In 2014, the Tartans moved back to the PAC, but failed to replicate the same successful start that they had in the UAA, not winning a conference championship until 2021. Following the 2021 PAC title win, Coach Lackner announced his retirement from football.

=== The Ryan Larsen era ===
In 2022, Carnegie Mellon announced that they would be hiring Columbia quarterbacks coach Ryan Larsen as their next head coach. Larsen wasted no time in finding early success, shattering expectations by posting an 11-1 season in Larsen's debut year.

That 2022 Tartans team boasted the longest win streak in college football with eighteen consecutive wins. Having been disqualified from the playoffs in 2021 due to a Covid-19 outbreak, Carnegie Mellon followed up their seven game win streak at the conclusion of the 2021 season with a perfect 2022 season. The Tartans win streak existed until the sweet sixteen of that year's playoffs, when they ultimately fell to the National Champion North Central Cardinals.

The 2023 team posted a similarly impressive record of 10-1. Despite a regular season record of 9-1, the Tartans were not given a bid to the division III playoff. They were, however, selected to compete in a bowl game against the SUNY Brockport Golden Eagles in a game which was touted as being one between two of the best teams not selected for the playoffs that year. The Tartans dispelled any thoughts about their perceived parity with the Golden Eagles as they earned a commanding 37-7 win.

In 2024, like in 2023, the Tartans suffered only one regular season loss, again to Grove City. However, unlike 2023, the Tartans earned an at-large bid to the Division 3 playoffs. After receiving a first-round bye, the Tartans defeated the Centre Colonels in the second round before falling to the Mount Union Purple Raiders in the round of sixteen.

In 2025, Carnegie Mellon joined the Centennial Conference as an associate football member. They finished 6-5 in their inaugural season.

== Playoff appearances ==
=== NCAA Division III ===
The Tartans have made eight appearances in the NCAA Division III playoffs, with a combined record of 5–8.

Year	Round	Opponent	Result
1978	Quarterfinals; Semifinals	Dayton; Baldwin–Wallace	W, 24–21; L, 6–31
1979	Quarterfinals; Semifinals	Minnesota–Morris; Ithaca	W, 31–25; L, 6–15
1983	Quarterfinals	Salisbury State	L, 14–16
1985	First Round	Salisbury State	L, 22–35
1990	First Round	Lycoming	L, 7–17
2006	First Round; Second Round	Millsaps; Wesley	W, 21–0; L, 0–37
2021	First Round	North Central (IL)	No Contest
2022	First Round; Second Round	DePauw; North Central (IL)	W, 45–14; L, 7–28
2024	Second Round; Third Round	Centre (KY); Mount Union	W, 24–15; L, 19–24

== College Football Hall of Fame Inductees ==
Name	Time at Carnegie Mellon	Position	Inducted
Lloyd Yoder	1923-1926	OT	1982
Howard Harpster	1926-1928, 1933-1936	Quarterback/Head Coach	1956
Chuck Klausing	1976–1985	Head coach	1998
Sam Benger	2014-2017	HB	2017

== Carnegie Mellon Hall of Fame Inductees ==
Name	Time at Carnegie Mellon	Position	Inducted
Lloyd Yoder	1923-1926	OT	2019
Howard Harpster	1926-1928, 1933-1936	Quarterback/Head Coach	2019
Aaron Lewis	2004-2007	DB	2019
Rich Lackner	1975-2021	LB/Assistant Coach/Head Coach	2019
Ken Murawski	1978-1981	Defenseman	2019
Chuck Klausing	1976–1985	Head coach	2021
Raymond Carnelly	1935-38	HB	2021
Scott Barnyak	1988-1991	HB	2021
Sam Benger	2014-2017	HB	2024

== Rivalries ==
=== Case Western Reserve ===
Currently, the Tartans' fiercest rivalry is with the Case Western Reserve University Spartans. The winner of the game is awarded the Academic Bowl Trophy. Predating the Academic Bowl trophy name, Carnegie Tech first played Case Tech in 1907 and Western Reserve in 1909, meeting up multiple times over the next few decades. Upon the merger of Case Tech and Western Reserve, the match-up resumed in 1970. It was not until 1986 when the Academic Bowl was officially created. The match-up mirrors the sports rivalry between the two cities of Cleveland and Pittsburgh.

The Academic Bowl emphasizes “Commitment to Academic and Athletic Excellence,” as both universities are often ranked scholastically among the top in the nation, especially as research universities.

As of 2024, Carnegie Mellon leads Case Western Reserve 23–15 in the rivalry.

=== Pittsburgh City Title Series (1920s-1940s) ===
Starting in the 1920s, Carnegie Tech participated in the Pittsburgh City Title Series, a three-way rivalry with their Pittsburgh neighbors the Pitt Panthers and Duquesne Dukes. The Tartans, Panthers, and Dukes were all nationally contending football teams at the time, leading Pittsburgh to be christened the "city of champions" in college football.

At the peak of the rivalry, games between Pitt, Duquesne, and Carnegie Tech would regularly draw crowds of well over 40,000; which was more than the World Series at the time.

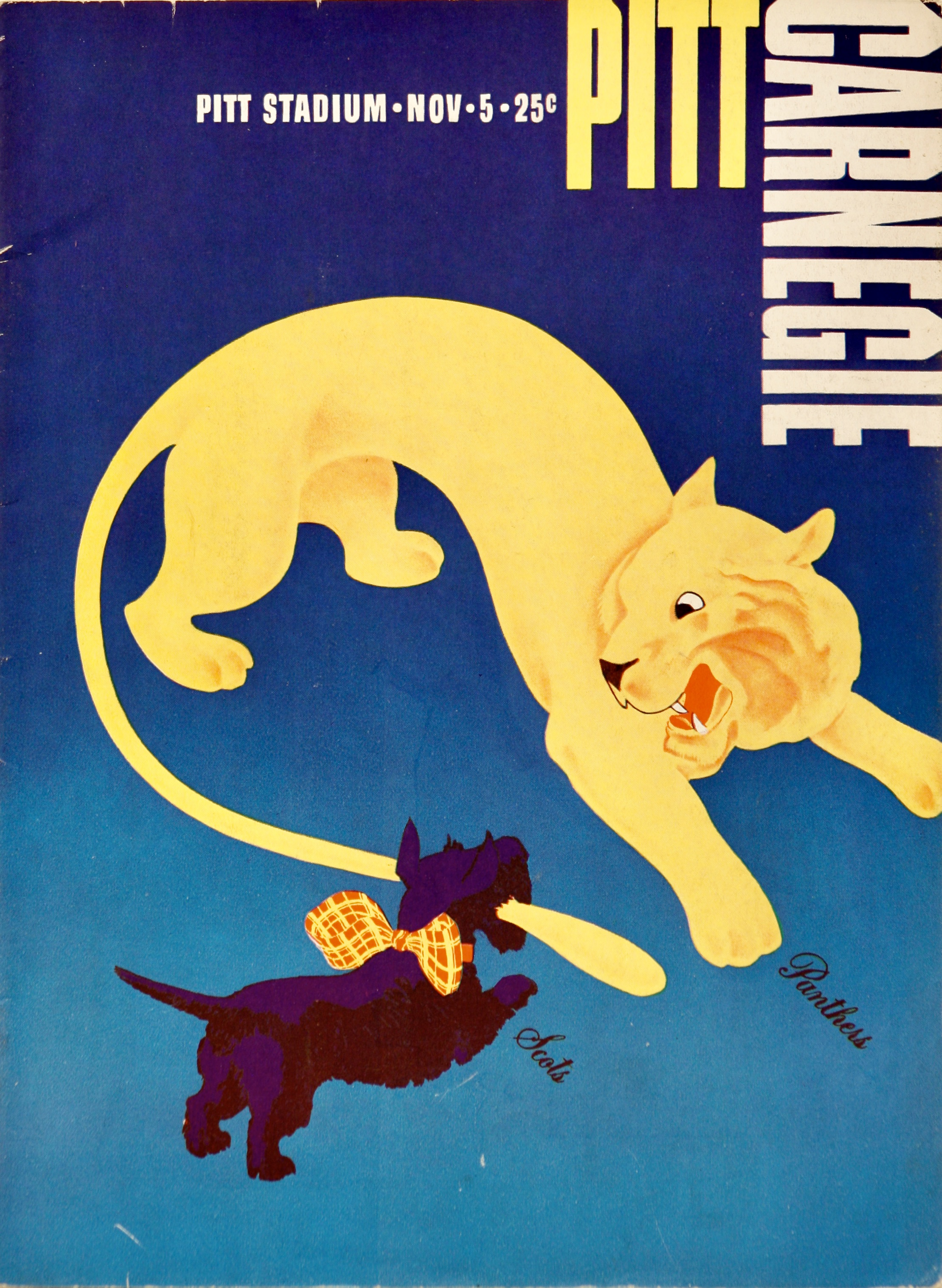
Program for the 1938 Carnegie Tech vs Pitt showdown

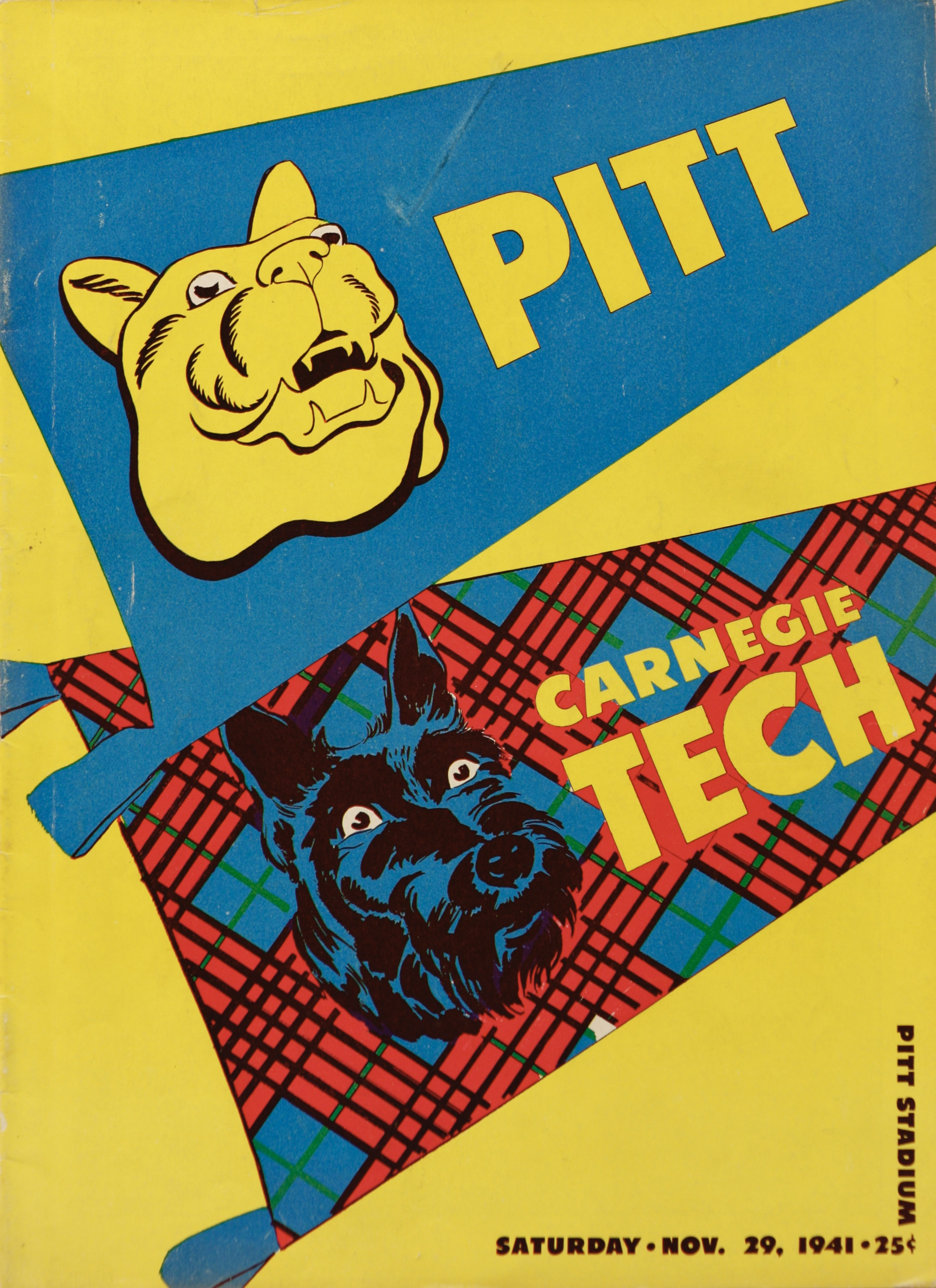
Advertisement for the 1941 Pittsburgh vs Carnegie Tech Football Game

The most memorable game between Carnegie and Pitt came in 1938, when the number 19 ranked Tartans upset the number 1 ranked Panthers in front of 60,000 fans, breaking Pitt's 22-game win streak and spoiling their hopes for an unbeaten 1938 campaign. Carnegie Tech Head Coach Bill Kern was remarkably pessimistic before the game, saying, "They're too strong for us. However, if our boys are up and Pitt is down we'll give them a battle, not enough of a battle to win but enough to hold the score down. I feel that our backs are almost as good as theirs but their big advantage lies in the line." Pitt Head coach Jock Sutherland did not share Kern's confidence in a Pitt victory, commenting, "Tech has us in a good spot for them. They'll be tremendously tough. The Tech team will be up for this game, while our boys will suffer a natural letdown from the hard Fordham game [the previous week]. I figure this game to be every bit as tough as Fordham. Our team is not at its best. We have a small squad and lack capable reserves." Despite Coach Kern's prediction, the Tartans claimed to a 20-10 victory over the Panthers, securing their claim to the Pittsburgh City Title that year.

The Panthers earned their revenge the following season however, as they defeated the Carnegie Tech Tartans 6-0 in front of a ruckus crowd of 55,000 at Pitt Stadium. Carnegie Tech's loss to the Panthers came as a part of a 5 game win streak that closed out their 1939 campaign. Despite starting with a perfect record that year, the Tartans lost out the back end of their season, including losses to rivals Notre Dame and Duquesne. With the Tartans' 7-22 home loss to Duquesne in the last game of the season, they became one of the only teams to be swept in the Pittsburgh City Title series the year after winning it.

While matchups between Pitt and Carnegie Tech were typically (but not always) showcased by more offense, the games between Duquesne and the Tartans were almost always defensive battles. Showdowns between the Tartans and the Dukes would regularly end with one side being shut out, and in 1931, the Tartans even tied the Dukes 0-0 in front of a crowd of 50,000.

Ultimately, the Dukes were forced to play a more supporting role in the Pittsburgh City Title Series, in large part due to their location in the city. Duquesne University is located in the Bluff, on the western side of Pittsburgh, whereas the University of Pittsburgh is located in Oakland, and Carnegie Tech/Carnegie Mellon is located in the adjacent Squirrel Hill neighborhood. Both Pitt and Carnegie are viewable from each other's campuses, and they are less than a five minute walk away from each other.

== Traditions ==
=== Kiltie Band ===
The Carnegie Mellon band is named the Kiltie Band, due to the fact that the entire band wears kilts while performing. That unique fact has also earned them the nickname "the band without pants." Unlike most bands, which are placed near the corners of the stadium, the Kiltie Band is positioned on the 50-yard line, right in the middle of the stands at Gesling Stadium.

The band draws inspiration from the critically acclaimed 1975 film, Monty Python and the Holy Grail. Under tradition, a King takes to the track every home game between the third and fourth quarters, to quest for the Grail, with his loyal steed, Patsy.

The band regularly plays an active role in the game beyond just playing music, chanting when the opposing team receives penalties, performing push-ups after big plays, and barking in a similar mannerism as a scottie dog.

=== Fight Song ===
The Carnegie Mellon Tartans have an original fight song titled "Fight for the Glory of Carnegie." The lyrics are as follows:

Fight for the glory of Carnegie!
Fight for the glory of the clan!
Let your eyes be ever on the Tartan bright,
As we stand united, every man -
Fight! Fight! Fight!

Fight, ev'ry loyal son of Skibo,
Fight till we win the victory!
The Kilties are coming, hurray! Hurray!
The Kilties are coming, they'll win today,
For they're fighting for the glory of Carnegie.

=== The Tailgate ===
During every home game, the families of the Tartan football players set up a tailgate on the rooftop of the East Campus Garage, which overlooks the football field. The tailgate serves food to players and recruits after the game and provides a place for recruits to meet and talk to both current and former Carnegie Mellon football players after the game.
