= Erkin Doniyorov =

Uzbekistani judoka (born 1990)

Personal information
- Born: 9 April 1990 (age 36)
- Occupation: Judoka

Sport
- Country: Uzbekistan
- Sport: Judo
- Weight class: ‍–‍90 kg, ‍–‍100 kg

Achievements and titles
- World Champ.: R32 (2013)
Medal record
Men's judo
Representing Uzbekistan
IJF Grand Slam
Silver medal – second place	2013 Moscow	‍–‍90 kg
IJF Grand Prix
Silver medal – second place	2013 Tashkent	‍–‍90 kg
Bronze medal – third place	2015 Ulaanbaatar	‍–‍90 kg
Bronze medal – third place	2016 Tashkent	‍–‍100 kg

Profile at external databases
- IJF: 11412
- JudoInside.com: 86079
- Updated on 27 November 2022

Erkin Doniyorov (born 9 April 1990) is an Uzbekistani judoka.

Doniyorov is a bronze medalist from the 2016 Judo Grand Prix Tashkent in the ‍–‍100 kg category.
