= Juan Romero (judoka) =

Uruguayan judoka (born 1988)

Personal information
- Born: 19 October 1988 (age 37) Montevideo, Uruguay

Sport
- Sport: Judo
Medal record
Representing Uruguay
Men's judo
South American Games
Silver medal – second place	2014 Santiago	–90 kg

Juan Romero (born 19 October 1988) is a Uruguayan judoka.

He competed at the 2012 Summer Olympics in the -90 kg event, where he lost in the first round against South Korean Song Dae-nam who won the gold medal.

He also competed at the 2015 Pan American Games in the -90 kg event, finishing 7th.
