= 1973 Carnegie Mellon Tartans football team =

American college football season

1973 Carnegie Mellon Tartans football
- Conference: Presidents' Athletic Conference
- Record: 5–3 (4–3 PAC)
- Head coach: Joe Gasparella (11th season)
- Home stadium: Tech Field

1973 Presidents' Athletic Conference football standings
	Conf.					Overall
Team	W		L		T	W		L		T
John Carroll $	5	–	0	–	2	7	–	1	–	2
Allegheny	5	–	1	–	1	5	–	3	–	1
Thiel	4	–	2	–	1	6	–	2	–	1
Hiram	4	–	3	–	0	5	–	4	–	0
Carnegie Mellon	4	–	3	–	0	5	–	3	–	0
Bethany (WV)	2	–	5	–	0	3	–	5	–	1
Washington & Jefferson	2	–	5	–	0	2	–	7	–	0
Case Western Reserve	0	–	7	–	0	0	–	9	–	0
$ – Conference champion

The 1973 Carnegie Mellon Tartans football team was an American football team that represented Carnegie Mellon University as a member of the Presidents' Athletic Conference (PAC) during the 1973 NCAA Division III football season. Led by 11th-year head coach Joe Gasparella, the Tartans compiled an overall record of 5–3 record with a mark of 4–3 in conference play, tying for fourth place in the PAC. The five victories matched the team's highest win total during Gasparella's tenure. Carnegie Mellon played home games at Tech Field in Pittsburgh.

== Schedule ==
Date	Opponent	Site	Result	Attendance	Source
September 29	at Oberlin*	Oberlin, OH	W 23–8		
October 6	at Bethany (WV)	Bethany, WV	L 8–18	2500	
October 13	Allegheny	Tech Field; Pittsburgh, PA	W 10–0		
October 20	at John Carroll	University Heights, OH	L 7–20		
October 27	at Case Western Reserve	Cleveland, OH	W 30–0		
November 3	Washington & Jefferson^{†}	Tech Field; Pittsburgh, PA	W 21–13	3000	
November 10	at Thiel	Stewart Field; Greenville, PA	L 6–10		
November 17	Hiram	Tech Field; Pittsburgh, PA	W 14–13		
*Non-conference game; ^{†}Homecoming

== Roster ==
1973 Carnegie Mellon Tartans football team roster
Players
Coaches
Offense

Pos.	#	Name	Class
FL	10	R. Matthew Fleig	Fr
QB, P	11	Ted Harhai	Fr
QB	14	Jay Duquette	Fr
FL	20	Bruce Bickar	Fr
QB	21	Ron Shinault	Sr
RB	23	Terry Tiberio	Jr
RB	24	Richard West	Fr
FL	25	Dan Stempkowski	Fr
RB	32	Patrick Counihan	Fr
RB	34	Gary Bonn	Fr
RB	40	Robert Curtis	Jr
RB	41	John Radic	Sr
FL	42	Pete Skirchak	Fr
RB	46	Thomas Maguire	Fr
RB	47	Peter Kullen	Fr
C	52	Robert Amber	Fr
C	53	John Slava	Jr
OT	54	Rod Jurkiewicz	Sr
C	55	Nichola Redondo	Fr
G	56	Ron Davidson	Fr
OT	60	Jim Puder	Fr
G	61	David Naokoul	Fr
G	62	John Moore	Sr
G	63	Tom Loughran	Jr
G	66	David Gerst	Fr
G, LB	68	Rudy Woodhouse	Fr
OT	70	Daniel Berkley	Jr
OT	71	Martin Gannon	So
OT	74	Raymond Moncini	Fr
OT	75	Joseph Loughran	Fr
OT	77	Jim Stupar	Jr
OT	78	Sheldon Epstein	Fr
OT	79	Michael Kadilak	Fr
E	80	Theodore Crandall	Fr
E	85	Tom Trainor	Fr
E	86	John Fischer	Fr
SE	87	Brian Carlock (C)	Sr
E	88	Brad Punko	Fr
E	89	Richard Schademan	Fr

Defense

Pos.	#	Name	Class
DE, K	13	Thomas McMeekin	Fr
DB	22	Robert Scott	Jr
DB	26	Michael Haupt	Fr
DB	27	Ernest Goffi	Fr
DB	28	Mark Koshute	Fr
LB	31	Mark Balent	So
LB	33	Mike Bralkowski (C)	Sr
DB	43	Shannon Johnson	Fr
DB	44	Curt Simmons	Sr
DB	45	Bill Vukoder	Sr
LB	50	Clyde Ligons	Sr
LB	51	Bill Reppa	So
DT, DE	59	Calvin Scott	Fr
LB	64	Douglas Danko	Fr
LB	65	Doug Goimarac	Fr
DT, DE	72	Phil LaGatta	Jr
DT, DE	73	Stanley Nye	Jr
DT, DE	76	Steve Baran	Fr
DE, TE	84	Bob Pyzdrowski	Jr

Special teams

Pos.	#	Name	Class

Head coach

- Joe Gasparella

Coordinators/assistant coaches

- Edward Fay
- Ned Mervos
- Rudy Yaksich

Legend

- (C) Team captain
- (S) Suspended
- (I) Ineligible
- Injured
- Redshirt
