= Judo at the 2015 Pan American Games – Men's 90 kg =

Men's 90 kg at the 2015 Pan American Games
- Venue: Mississauga Sports Centre
- Dates: July 13
- Competitors: 10 from 10 nations

Medalists
Gold medal	Tiago Camilo	Brazil
Silver medal	Asley González	Cuba
Bronze medal	Jacob Larsen	United States
Bronze medal	Isao Cárdenas	Mexico

The men's 90 kg competition of the judo events at the 2015 Pan American Games in Toronto, Canada, was held on July 13 at the Mississauga Sports Centre.

== Schedule ==
All times are Central Standard Time (UTC-6).

Date	Time	Round
July 13, 2015	15:21	Preliminary bout
July 13, 2015	16:38	Quarterfinals
July 13, 2015	16:17	Repechage
July 13, 2015	17:48	Semifinals
July 13, 2015	21:23	Bronze medal matches
July 13, 2015	21:37	Final

== Results ==
Legend

- 1st number = Ippon
- 2nd number = Waza-ari
- 3rd number = Yuko

=== Bracket ===
Preliminaries
Cristhian Gomera (DOM)	001S2
Nelson Martínez (VEN)	001S1
Jonah Burt (CAN)	000S2
Rafael Romo (CHI)	001S3

Quarter Finals
Asley González (CUB)	100S1
Jacob Larsen (USA)	000
Isao Cárdenas (MEX)	001S1
Nelson Martínez (VEN)	000S1
Tiago Camilo (BRA)	100S1
Rafael Romo (CHI)	000S2
Cristian Schmidt (ARG)	101
Juan Romero (URU)	000

Semi Finals
Asley González (CUB)	000S1
Isao Cárdenas (MEX)	000S3
Tiago Camilo (BRA)	110S1
Cristian Schmidt (ARG)	000S4

Final
Asley González (CUB)	000S2
Tiago Camilo (BRA)	000

=== Repechage round ===
Two bronze medals were awarded.

Repechage		Bronze medal
Jacob Larsen (USA)	010S2
Nelson Martínez (VEN)	000	Jacob Larsen (USA)	010
		Cristian Schmidt (ARG)	010S1

Repechage		Bronze medal
Rafael Romo (CHI)	010S1
Juan Romero (URU)	000S2	Rafael Romo (CHI)	000S1
		Isao Cárdenas (MEX)	110
