= Gesling Stadium =

Sports field

- "The G"
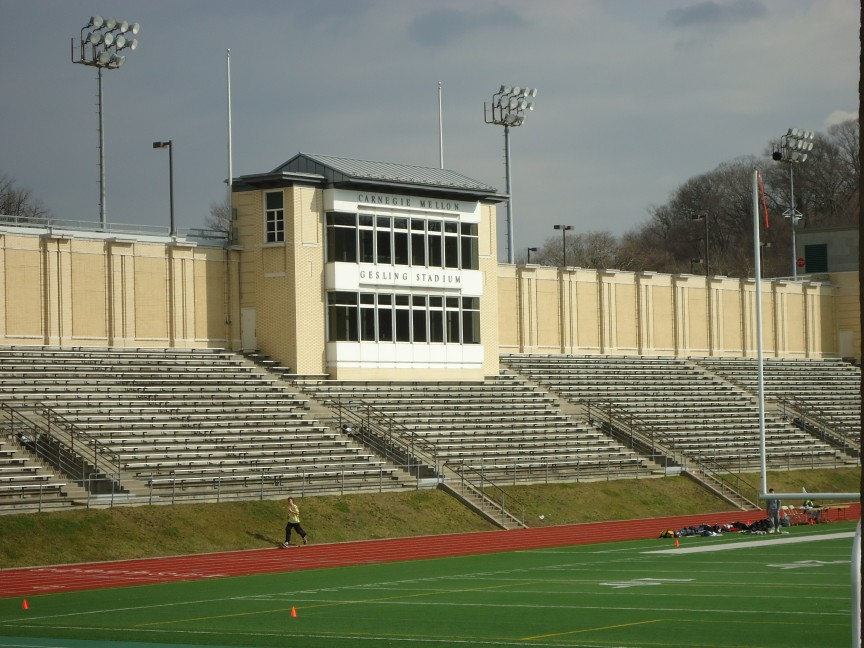
- Gesling Stadium, 2011.
- Location: 5000 Forbes Avenue Pittsburgh, Pennsylvania, 15213
- Owner: Carnegie Mellon University
- Operator: Carnegie Mellon University
- Capacity: 3,900
- Surface: FieldTurf

Construction
- Opened: 1990

Tenants
- Carnegie Mellon football Carnegie Mellon track and field Carnegie Mellon men's soccer (1990–2010); Carnegie Mellon women's soccer (1990–2010)

Gesling Stadium is a 3,900-seat stadium in Pittsburgh, primarily used for football. Built in 1990, it has served as the home of the Carnegie Mellon Tartans football team, as well as Carnegie Mellon's track and field programs. From 1990 to 2010, it also hosted Carnegie Mellon's men's and women's soccer teams. Gesling Stadium has been described as a historic stadium within the President’s Athletic Conference.

Despite the fact that the Carnegie Mellon Tartans play at the NCAA Division III level, and Pittsburgh has two NCAA Division I teams in the Pitt Panthers and Duquesne Dukes, Gesling Stadium is the largest stadium in the city of Pittsburgh which was purpose-built primarily for college football. This is due to the fact that the University of Pittsburgh plays at Acrisure Stadium, which was primarily built for the Pittsburgh Steelers, and that the Arthur J. Rooney Athletic Field, home of the Duquesne Dukes, only has a capacity of 2,200.

== Description ==
Gesling Stadium sits within Carnegie Mellon's campus. The Jared L Cohen University Center is the backdrop to the stadium's west end zone, and the Judith Resnik and West Wing dorms overshadow the away sideline.

The field at Gesling Stadium is dedicated to longtime Carnegie Mellon football head coach Rich Lackner, making it Richard M. Lackner field at Gesling Stadium.

In addition to hosting Carnegie Mellon's varsity programs, Gesling Stadium also hosts a number of club and intramural sports, including Rugby and Quidditch.
