= Pittsburgh City Title Series =

- Sport: Football
- Teams: Carnegie Tech Tartans; Duquesne Dukes; Pittsburgh Panthers
- First meeting: October 27, 1906; Western University of Pennsylvania 31, Carnegie Tech 0
- Latest meeting: October 30, 1943; Pitt 45, Carnegie Tech 3

Statistics
- All-time series: Carnegie Tech 18–19–2, Duquesne 8–17–1, Pitt 19–7–1
- Largest victory: Pitt 45, Carnegie Tech 3 (1943)

The Pittsburgh City Title Series was a three-way college football rivalry that existed from the 1923 to 1943 between the Carnegie Tech Tartans, Pittsburgh Panthers, and Duquesne Dukes.

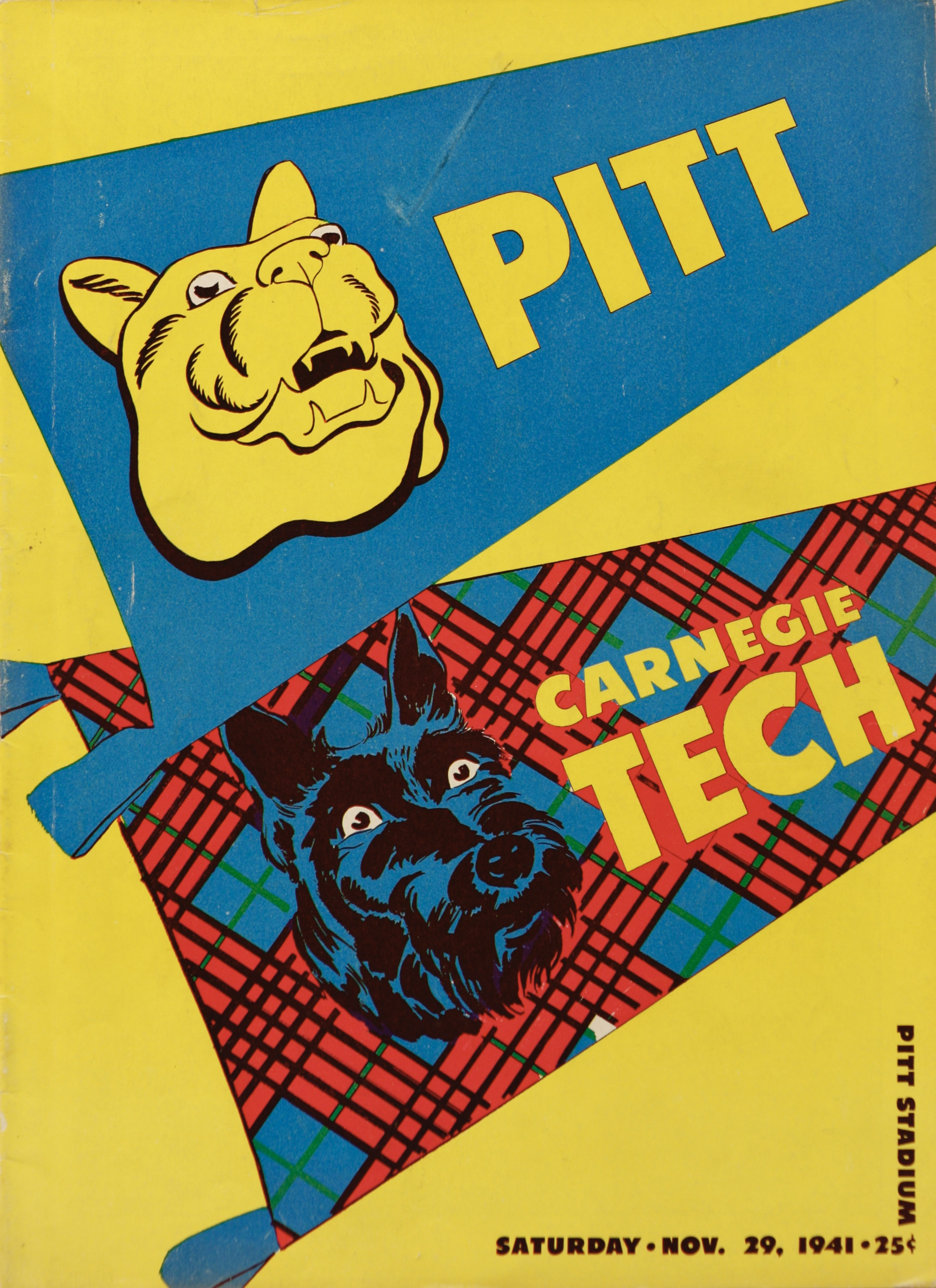
Advertisement for the 1941 Pittsburgh vs Carnegie Tech Football Game

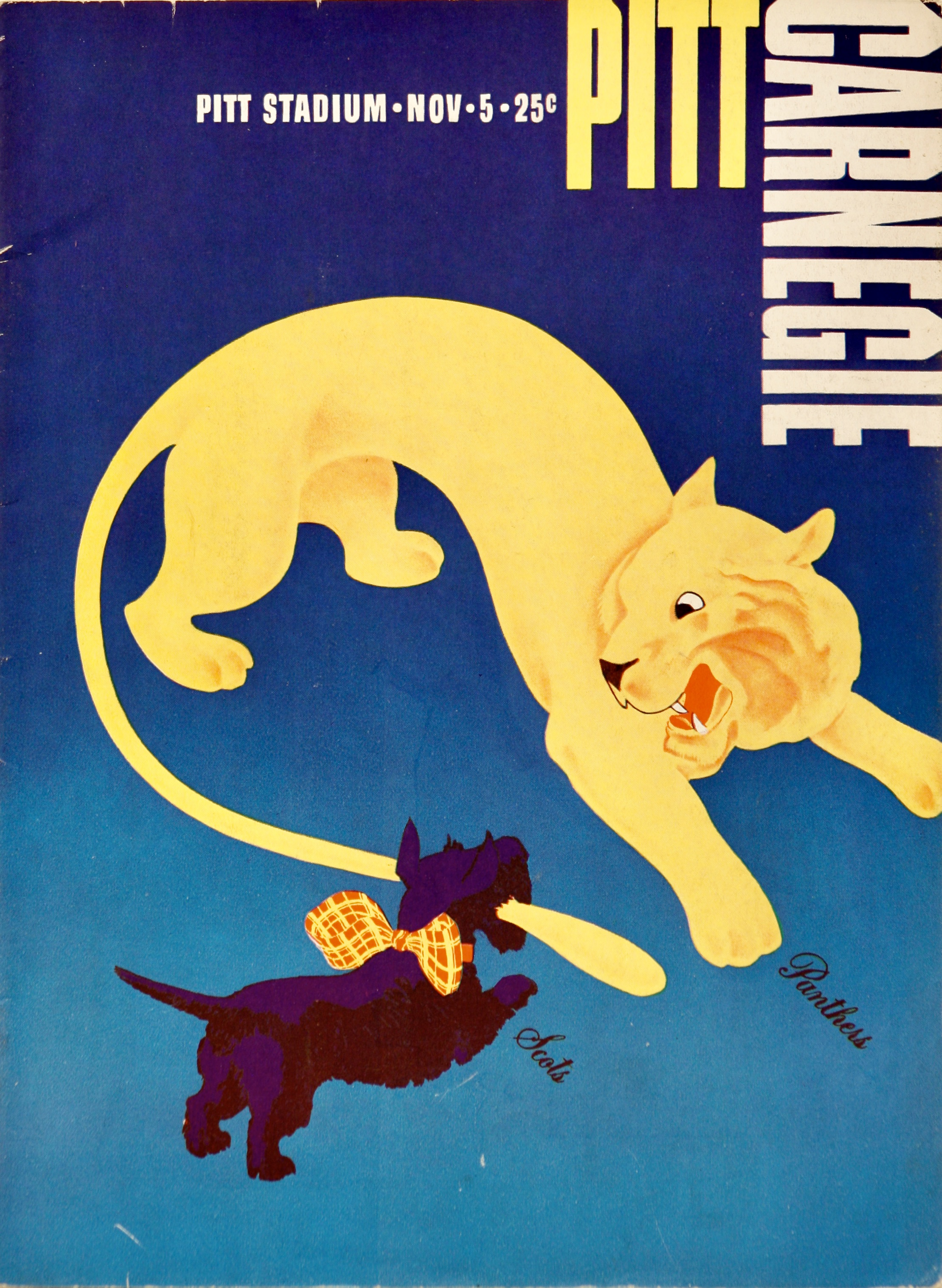
Program for the 1938 Carnegie Tech vs Pitt showdown

Starting in the 1920s, the Tartans, Panthers, and Dukes were all nationally contending football teams, leading Pittsburgh to be christened the "city of champions" in college football.

At the peak of the rivalry, games between Pitt, Duquesne, and Carnegie Tech would regularly draw crowds of well over 40,000; which was more than the World Series at the time.

The most memorable game between Carnegie and Pitt came in 1938, when the number 19 ranked Tartans upset the number 1 ranked Panthers in front of 60,000 fans, breaking Pitt's 22-game win streak and spoiling their hopes for an unbeaten 1938 campaign. Carnegie Tech Head Coach Bill Kern was remarkably pessimistic before the game, saying, "They're too strong for us. However, if our boys are up and Pitt is down we'll give them a battle, not enough of a battle to win but enough to hold the score down. I feel that our backs are almost as good as theirs but their big advantage lies in the line." Pitt Head coach Jock Sutherland did not share Kern's confidence in a Pitt victory, commenting, "Tech has us in a good spot for them. They'll be tremendously tough. The Tech team will be up for this game, while our boys will suffer a natural letdown from the hard Fordham game [the previous week]. I figure this game to be every bit as tough as Fordham. Our team is not at its best. We have a small squad and lack capable reserves." Despite Coach Kern's prediction, the Tartans claimed to a 20–10 victory over the Panthers, securing their claim to the Pittsburgh City Title that year.

The Panthers earned their revenge the following season however, as they defeated the Carnegie Tech Tartans 6–0 in front of a ruckus crowd of 55,000 at Pitt Stadium. Carnegie Tech's loss to the Panthers came as a part of a 5-game win streak that closed out their 1939 campaign. Despite starting with a perfect record that year, the Tartans lost out the back end of their season, including losses to rivals Notre Dame and Duquesne. With the Tartans' 7–22 home loss to Duquesne in the last game of the season, they became one of the only teams to be swept in the Pittsburgh City Title series the year after winning it.

While matchups between Pitt and Carnegie Tech were typically (but not always) showcased by more offense, the games between Duquesne and the Tartans were almost always defensive battles. Showdowns between the Tartans and the Dukes would regularly end with one side being shut out, and in 1931, the Tartans even tied the Dukes 0–0 in front of a crowd of 50,000.

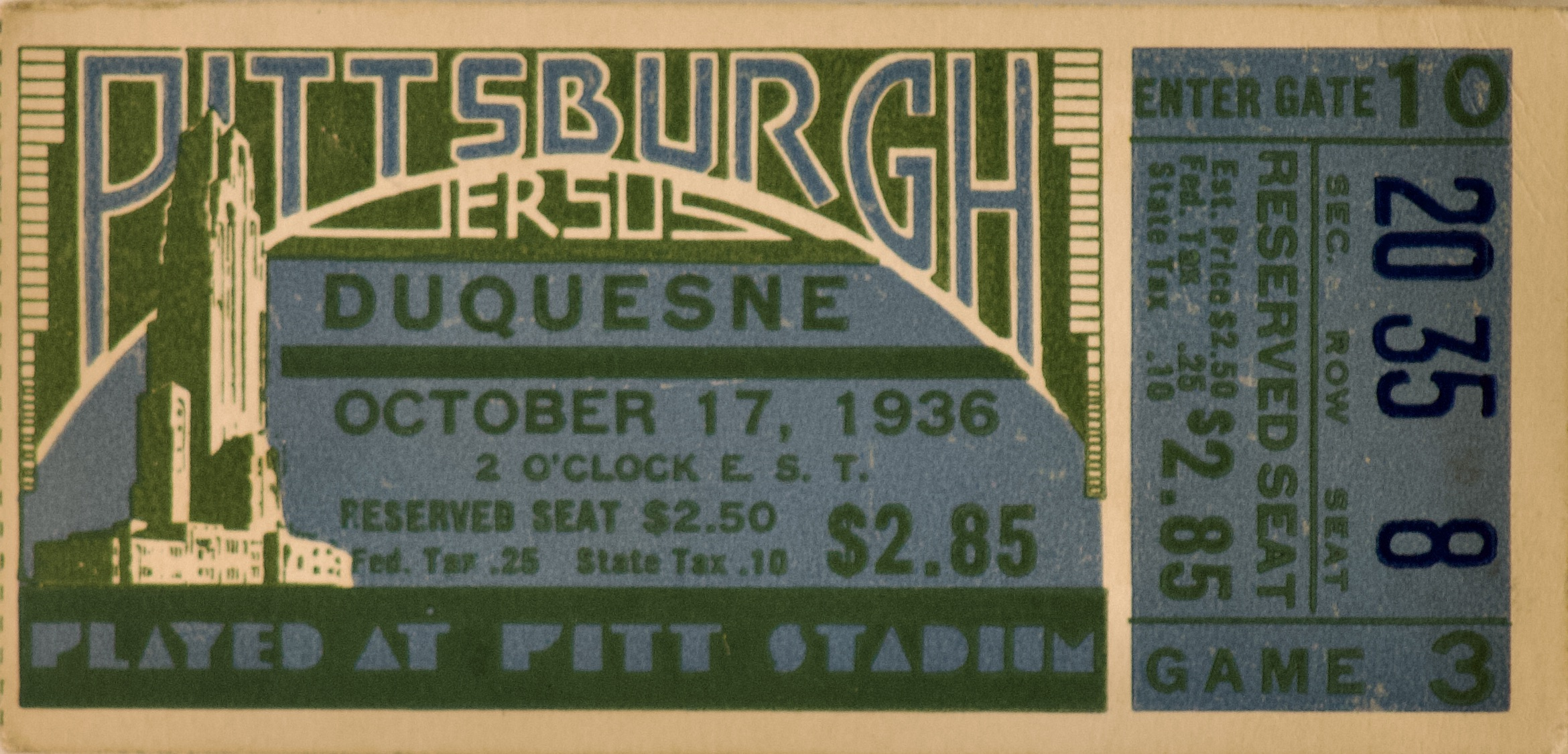
Ticket Stub for the 1936 matchup between Pitt and Duqesne

Games between Pitt and Duquesne were typically dominated by the Panthers, with the Dukes only claiming two victories in the 1930s. Despite the Panthers dominance in that leg of the rivalry, games between Pitt and Duquesne still regularly drew impressive crowds of over 20,000.

Ultimately, the Dukes were forced to play a more supporting role in the Pittsburgh City Title Series, in large part due to their location in the city. Duquesne University is located in the Bluff, on the western side of Pittsburgh, whereas the University of Pittsburgh is located in Oakland, and Carnegie Tech/Carnegie Mellon is located in the adjacent Squirrel Hill neighborhood. Both Pitt and Carnegie are viewable from each other's campuses, and they are less than a five-minute walk away from each other.

The Dukes did not play the Panthers at all in the 1940s, and Pitt and Carnegie Tech stopped playing regularly after the 1943 season, concluding the Pittsburgh City Title Series.
