= Romain Buffet =

French judoka (born 1985)

Personal information
- Born: 4 February 1985 (age 41)
- Occupation: Judoka

Sport
- Country: France
- Sport: Judo
- Weight class: ‍–‍90 kg

Achievements and titles
- Olympic Games: R32 (2012)
- World Champ.: R16 (2010)
- European Champ.: 5th (2012)
Medal record
Men's judo
Representing France
IJF Grand Slam
Bronze medal – third place	2011 Paris	‍–‍90 kg
IJF Grand Prix
Silver medal – second place	2011 Düsseldorf	‍–‍90 kg
Silver medal – second place	2015 Budapest	‍–‍90 kg
Summer Universiade
Bronze medal – third place	2009 Belgrade	‍–‍90 kg

Profile at external databases
- IJF: 1898
- JudoInside.com: 24654
- Updated on 28 November 2022

Romain Buffet (born 4 February 1985 in Rouen, France) is a French judoka. He competed at the 2012 Summer Olympics in the ‍–‍90 kg event.
