= Joe Gasparella =

American football player (1927–2000)

No. 48, 23, 44
- Position: Back

Personal information
- Born: February 5, 1927; Apollo, Pennsylvania, U.S.
- Died: November 21, 2000 (aged 73); Verona, Pennsylvania, U.S.
- Listed height: 6 ft 4 in (1.93 m)
- Listed weight: 222 lb (101 kg)

Career information
- High school: Vandergrift (PA) (Vandergrift, Pennsylvania)
- College: Notre Dame
- NFL draft: 1948: 6th round, 43rd overall pick

Career history

Playing
- Pittsburgh Steelers (1948–1951); Chicago Cardinals (1951)

Coaching
- Carnegie Tech / Carnegie Mellon Tartans (1963-1975) Head coach

Career NFL statistics
- Passing yards: 677
- TD–INT: 3–10
- Passer rating: 32.9
- Stats at Pro Football Reference

Head coaching record
- Regular season: 45–60–1 (.429)

Joseph Richard Gasparella (February 5, 1927 – November 21, 2000) was an American professional football quarterback and coach who played for the Pittsburgh Steelers and the Chicago Cardinals of the National Football League (NFL). He played college football at University of Notre Dame for the Notre Dame Fighting Irish. From 1963-1975 he was the head coach of the Carnegie Mellon/Carnegie Tech Tartans.

== Head coaching record ==
Year	Team	Overall	Conference	Standing	Bowl/playoffs
Carnegie Tech / Carnegie Mellon Tartans (NCAA College Division independent) (1963–1971)
1963	Carnegie Tech	1–6			
1964	Carnegie Tech	1–8			
1965	Carnegie Tech	1–7			
1966	Carnegie Tech	5–3			
1967	Carnegie Mellon	4–4			
1968	Carnegie Mellon	4–3–1			
1969	Carnegie Mellon	4–4			
1970	Carnegie Mellon	5–3			
1971	Carnegie Mellon	3–6			
Carnegie Mellon Tartans (Presidents' Athletic Conference) (1972–1975)
1972	Carnegie Mellon	4–5	4–3	4th	
1973	Carnegie Mellon	5–3	4–3	T–4th	
1974	Carnegie Mellon	3–5	2–5	T–6th	
1975	Carnegie Mellon	5–3	3–3	T–3rd	
Carnegie Tech / Carnegie Mellon:		45–60–1	13–14		
Total:		45–60–1			
