= Tamás Madarász =

Hungarian judoka (born 1987)

Personal information
- Born: 27 March 1987 (age 39)
- Occupation: Judoka

Sport
- Country: Hungary
- Sport: Judo
- Weight class: ‍–‍90 kg

Achievements and titles
- Olympic Games: R16 (2012)
- World Champ.: R32 (2009, 2010)
- European Champ.: R32 (2009)
Medal record
Men's judo
Representing Hungary
IJF Grand Prix
Bronze medal – third place	20090 Tunis	‍–‍90 kg

Profile at external databases
- IJF: 244
- JudoInside.com: 35977
- Updated on 3 January 2023

Tamás Madarász (born 27 March 1987 in Debrecen, Hungary) is a Hungarian judoka. He competed at the 2012 Summer Olympics in the ‍–‍90 kg event and lost his first match to Dilshod Choriev.
