= 2013 Pan American Judo Championships =

Judo competition

2013 Judo Pan American Judo Championships
- Venue: San José
- Location: San José, Costa Rica
- Dates: 18–20 April 2013
- Competitors: 206 from 22 nations

Competition at external databases
- Links: IJF • JudoInside

The 2013 Pan American Judo Championships was held in San José, Costa Rica from April 19–20, 2013.

== Medal table ==
Rank	Nation	Gold	Silver	Bronze	Total
1	Brazil (BRA)	8	2	6	16
2	Cuba (CUB)	4	6	1	11
3	Canada (CAN)	1	3	3	7
4	United States (USA)	1	2	7	10
5	Dominican Republic (DOM)	1	0	2	3
5	Venezuela (VEN)	1	0	2	3
7	Mexico (MEX)	0	2	4	6
8	Guatemala (GUA)	0	1	0	1
9	Argentina (ARG)	0	0	3	3
10	Colombia (COL)	0	0	2	2
11	Ecuador (ECU)	0	0	1	1
11	Puerto Rico (PUR)	0	0	1	1
Totals (12 entries)		16	16	32	64

=== Men's events ===
Event	Gold	Silver	Bronze
Super extra-lightweight (55 kg)	Kelvin Vásquez; Dominican Republic (DOM)	Adonis Diaz; United States (USA)	Cristian Toala; Ecuador (ECU)
Super extra-lightweight (55 kg)	Kelvin Vásquez; Dominican Republic (DOM)	Adonis Diaz; United States (USA)	Armando Maita; Venezuela (VEN)
Extra-lightweight (60 kg)	Felipe Kitadai; Brazil (BRA)	Nabor Castillo; Mexico (MEX)	Nicholas Kossor; United States (USA)
Extra-lightweight (60 kg)	Felipe Kitadai; Brazil (BRA)	Nabor Castillo; Mexico (MEX)	Abel Montero; Dominican Republic (DOM)
Half-lightweight (66 kg)	Luiz Revite; Brazil (BRA)	Patrick Gagné; Canada (CAN)	Bolen Bradford; United States (USA)
Half-lightweight (66 kg)	Luiz Revite; Brazil (BRA)	Patrick Gagné; Canada (CAN)	Charles Chibana; Brazil (BRA)
Lightweight (73 kg)	Nicholas Delpopolo; United States (USA)	Magdiel Estrada; Cuba (CUB)	Bruno Mendonça; Brazil (BRA)
Lightweight (73 kg)	Nicholas Delpopolo; United States (USA)	Magdiel Estrada; Cuba (CUB)	Alejandro Clara; Argentina (ARG)
Half-middleweight (81 kg)	Victor Penalber; Brazil (BRA)	Antoine Valois-Fortier; Canada (CAN)	Travis Stevens; United States (USA)
Half-middleweight (81 kg)	Victor Penalber; Brazil (BRA)	Antoine Valois-Fortier; Canada (CAN)	Jonathan Fernandez; United States (USA)
Middleweight (90 kg)	Asley González; Cuba (CUB)	Tiago Camilo; Brazil (BRA)	Alexandre Emond; Canada (CAN)
Middleweight (90 kg)	Asley González; Cuba (CUB)	Tiago Camilo; Brazil (BRA)	Jacob Larsen; United States (USA)
Half-heavyweight (100 kg)	Renan Nunes; Brazil (BRA)	José Armenteros; Cuba (CUB)	Dilyaver Sheykhisyamov; Canada (CAN)
Half-heavyweight (100 kg)	Renan Nunes; Brazil (BRA)	José Armenteros; Cuba (CUB)	Luciano Corrêa; Brazil (BRA)
Heavyweight (+100 kg)	Rafael Silva; Brazil (BRA)	Óscar Brayson; Cuba (CUB)	Alex García Mendoza; Cuba (CUB)
Heavyweight (+100 kg)	Rafael Silva; Brazil (BRA)	Óscar Brayson; Cuba (CUB)	Ramón Flores; Mexico (MEX)
Men's Team	Brazil (BRA)	Canada (CAN)	Cuba (CUB)
Men's Team	Brazil (BRA)	Canada (CAN)	Venezuela (VEN)

=== Women's events ===
Event	Gold	Silver	Bronze
Super extra-lightweight (44 kg)	Milagros González; Venezuela (VEN)	Evelin Rodríguez; Guatemala (GUA)	Estefania Soriano; Dominican Republic (DOM)
Super extra-lightweight (44 kg)	Milagros González; Venezuela (VEN)	Evelin Rodríguez; Guatemala (GUA)	Sandra Sánchez; Mexico (MEX)
Extra-lightweight (48 kg)	Sarah Menezes; Brazil (BRA)	Dayaris Mestre Álvarez; Cuba (CUB)	Paula Pareto; Argentina (ARG)
Extra-lightweight (48 kg)	Sarah Menezes; Brazil (BRA)	Dayaris Mestre Álvarez; Cuba (CUB)	Edna Carrillo; Mexico (MEX)
Half-lightweight (52 kg)	Yanet Bermoy; Cuba (CUB)	Luz Olvera; Mexico (MEX)	Mónica Hernández; Mexico (MEX)
Half-lightweight (52 kg)	Yanet Bermoy; Cuba (CUB)	Luz Olvera; Mexico (MEX)	Érika Miranda; Brazil (BRA)
Lightweight (57 kg)	Rafaela Silva; Brazil (BRA)	Marti Malloy; United States (USA)	Melissa Rodríguez; Argentina (ARG)
Lightweight (57 kg)	Rafaela Silva; Brazil (BRA)	Marti Malloy; United States (USA)	Ketleyn Quadros; Brazil (BRA)
Half-middleweight (63 kg)	Maricet Espinosa; Cuba (CUB)	Katerine Campos; Brazil (BRA)	Diana Velasco; Colombia (COL)
Half-middleweight (63 kg)	Maricet Espinosa; Cuba (CUB)	Katerine Campos; Brazil (BRA)	Hannah Martin; United States (USA)
Middleweight (70 kg)	Kelita Zupancic; Canada (CAN)	Onix Cortés; Cuba (CUB)	Kayla Harrison; United States (USA)
Middleweight (70 kg)	Kelita Zupancic; Canada (CAN)	Onix Cortés; Cuba (CUB)	Yuri Alvear; Colombia (COL)
Half-heavyweight (78 kg)	Mayra Aguiar; Brazil (BRA)	Catherine Roberge; Canada (CAN)	Keivi Pinto; Venezuela (VEN)
Half-heavyweight (78 kg)	Mayra Aguiar; Brazil (BRA)	Catherine Roberge; Canada (CAN)	Amy Cotton; Canada (CAN)
Heavyweight (+78 kg)	Idalis Ortiz; Cuba (CUB)	Heidy Abreu; Cuba (CUB)	Melissa Mojica; Puerto Rico (PUR)
Heavyweight (+78 kg)	Idalis Ortiz; Cuba (CUB)	Heidy Abreu; Cuba (CUB)	Rochele Nunes; Brazil (BRA)
Women's Team	United States (USA)	Mexico (MEX)	Cuba (CUB)
Women's Team	United States (USA)	Mexico (MEX)	Brazil (BRA)
