= Asley González =

Cuban-Romanian Olympic judoka

Personal information
- Born: 5 September 1989 (age 36) Caibarién, Villa Clara, Cuba
- Occupation: Judoka

Sport
- Country: Cuba (until 2018); Romania (since 2021)
- Sport: Judo
- Weight class: ‍–‍90 kg, ‍–‍100 kg

Achievements and titles
- Olympic Games: (silver) (2012)
- World Champ.: (2013)
- Pan American Champ.: (2011, 2013)
Medal record
Men's judo
Representing Romania
IJF Grand Slam
Silver medal – second place	2021 Paris	‍–‍100 kg
Representing Cuba
Olympic Games
Silver medal – second place	2012 London	‍–‍90 kg
World Championships
Gold medal – first place	2013 Rio de Janeiro	‍–‍90 kg
Bronze medal – third place	2011 Paris	‍–‍90 kg
Pan American Games
Silver medal – second place	2011 Guadalajara	‍–‍90 kg
Silver medal – second place	2015 Toronto	‍–‍90 kg
Pan American Championships
Gold medal – first place	2011 Guadalajara	‍–‍90 kg
Gold medal – first place	2013 San José	‍–‍90 kg
Silver medal – second place	2012 Montreal	‍–‍90 kg
Silver medal – second place	2015 Edmonton	‍–‍90 kg
Silver medal – second place	2018 San José	‍–‍90 kg
World Masters
Bronze medal – third place	2013 Tyumen	‍–‍90 kg
Bronze medal – third place	2015 Rabat	‍–‍90 kg
IJF Grand Slam
Silver medal – second place	2011 Rio de Janeiro	‍–‍90 kg
Silver medal – second place	2011 Tokyo	‍–‍90 kg
Silver medal – second place	2013 Paris	‍–‍90 kg
Silver medal – second place	2015 Tokyo	‍–‍90 kg
Bronze medal – third place	2012 Paris	‍–‍90 kg
IJF Grand Prix
Gold medal – first place	2013 Miami	‍–‍90 kg
Gold medal – first place	2016 Havana	‍–‍90 kg
Silver medal – second place	2015 Qingdao	‍–‍90 kg
Silver medal – second place	2018 Zagreb	‍–‍90 kg
Bronze medal – third place	2015 Budapest	‍–‍90 kg

Profile at external databases
- IJF: 7755, 65194
- JudoInside.com: 46200
- Updated on 9 February 2025

Asley González (born 5 September 1989) is a Cuban-born judoka who has competed for both Cuba and Romania. He won a silver medal in the 2012 Summer Olympics and became World Champion in 2013 in the ‍–‍90 kg category. Since 2021, he has represented Romania in international competitions.

== Early life and background ==
Asley González was born in Caibarién, a town in Villa Clara Province, Cuba. He began practicing judo at a young age and quickly advanced through the Cuban judo ranks, demonstrating skill and strength in the middleweight division.

== Judo career ==
=== Early international career (2008–2011) ===
González made his Olympic debut at the 2008 Summer Olympics, competing in the ‍–‍90 kg weight category. However, he was eliminated in the early rounds after losing to Yves-Matthieu Dafreville. He won his first Pan American Championships gold medal in Guadalajara 2011.

=== 2012 Olympics and World Championship victory (2012–2013) ===
At the 2012 Summer Olympics in London, González competed in the men's 90 kg category. He won his matches against Héctor Campos, Dmitrij Gerasimenko, and Mark Anthony, reaching the final against Song Dae-nam of South Korea. Despite a strong performance, he lost in the final, securing an Olympic silver medal for Cuba.

In 2013, González achieved his career-best result by winning gold at the 2013 World Championships in Rio de Janeiro.

=== Later years and injury struggles (2014–2018) ===
Between 2014 and 2018, González faced multiple injuries, limiting his participation in international competitions. Despite this, he won silver at the 2015 Pan American Games and multiple Pan American Championship medals.

=== Switch to Romania and return to competition (2021–present) ===
In 2021, González announced his switch to Romania, citing better opportunities for training and competition. He represented Romania in the 100 kg weight class at the 2021 Paris Grand Slam, winning a silver medal.

== Personal life ==
González speaks Spanish and Romanian and has trained in both Cuba and Romania. He remains active in the judo community, mentoring young judokas and participating in international judo training camps.

== See also ==
- List of Olympic medalists for Cuba
- List of World Judo Championships medalists
- Judo at the 2012 Summer Olympics
