= Timur Bolat =

Kazakhstani judoka (born 1989)

Personal information
- Born: 14 May 1989 (age 37) Ulaanbaatar, Mongolia
- Occupation: Judoka

Sport
- Country: Kazakhstan
- Sport: Judo
- Weight class: ‍–‍90 kg

Achievements and titles
- Olympic Games: R16 (2012)
- World Champ.: R16 (2010)
- Asian Champ.: (bronze) (2009, 2011)
Medal record
Men's judo
Representing Kazakhstan
Asian Games
Silver medal – second place	2014 Incheon	Men's team
Asian Championships
Bronze medal – third place	2009 Taipei	‍–‍90 kg
Bronze medal – third place	2011 Abu Dhabi	‍–‍90 kg
IJF Grand Prix
Bronze medal – third place	2010 Düsseldorf	‍–‍90 kg
Asian Junior Championships
Silver medal – second place	2007 Hyderabad	‍–‍81 kg
Bronze medal – third place	2006 Jeju	‍–‍81 kg

Profile at external databases
- IJF: 480
- JudoInside.com: 39087
- Updated on 2 January 2023

Timur Bolat (born 14 May 1989 in Ulaanbaatar) is a Mongolian-born Kazakhstani judoka. He competed at the 2012 Summer Olympics in the ‍–‍90 kg event and lost his second match to Masashi Nishiyama. Bolat won bronze medals at the 2009 and 2011 Asian Judo Championships.
