= Judo at the 2012 Summer Olympics – Men's 90 kg =

Men's 90kg at the Games of the XXX Olympiad
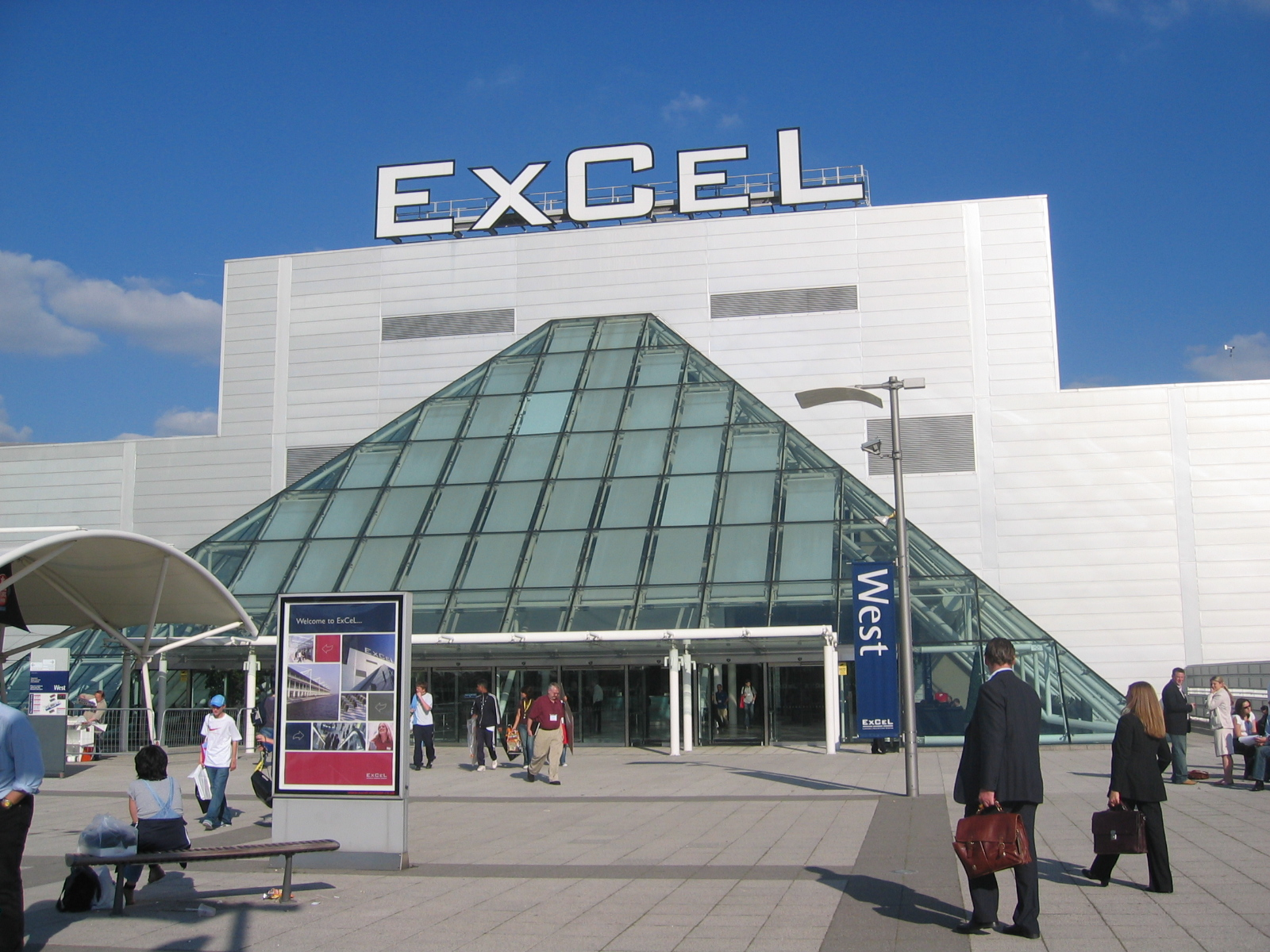
- ExCel Exhibition Centre
- Venue: ExCeL Exhibition Centre
- Date: 1 August 2012
- Competitors: 30 from 30 nations

Medalists
1st place, gold medalist(s)		Song Dae-Nam	South Korea
2nd place, silver medalist(s)		Asley González	Cuba
3rd place, bronze medalist(s)		Ilias Iliadis	Greece
3rd place, bronze medalist(s)		Masashi Nishiyama	Japan

Men's 90 kg competition in judo at the 2012 Summer Olympics in London, United Kingdom, took place at ExCeL London.

The gold and silver medals were determined by a single-elimination tournament, with the winner of the final taking gold and the loser receiving silver. Judo events awarded two bronze medals. Quarterfinal losers competed in a repechage match for the right to face a semifinal loser for a bronze medal (that is, the judokas defeated in quarterfinals A and B competed against each other, with the winner of that match facing the semifinal loser from the other half of the bracket).

== Schedule ==
All times are British Summer Time (UTC+1)

Date	Time	Round
Wednesday, 1 August 2012	09:30; 14:00; 16:10	Qualifications; Semifinals; Final

== Results ==
=== Finals ===
Semi-finals
Kirill Denisov (RUS)	0001
Asley González (CUB)	1000
Song Dae-Nam (KOR)	0112
Tiago Camilo (BRA)	0012

Final
Asley González (CUB)	0001
Song Dae-Nam (KOR)	0101

=== Repechages ===
Repechage		Bronze medal
Ilias Iliadis (GRE)	1000
Mark Anthony (AUS)	0000	Ilias Iliadis (GRE)	0011
		Tiago Camilo (BRA)	0002

Repechage		Bronze medal
Masashi Nishiyama (JPN)	0012
Dilshod Choriev (UZB)	0012	Masashi Nishiyama (JPN)	0000
		Kirill Denisov (RUS)	0000

=== Pool A ===
First Round		Second Round		Quarterfinals
I Iliadis (GRE)	0111
M Randl (SVK)	0002	I Iliadis (GRE)	0100
K Bauža (LTU)	0100	K Bauža (LTU)	0003
R Buffet (FRA)	0010			I Iliadis (GRE)	0000
K Denisov (RUS)	1000			K Denisov (RUS)	0020
I Remarenco (MDA)	0001	K Denisov (RUS)	0010
A Émond (CAN)	0000	W Gordon (GBR)	0000
W Gordon (GBR)	1000

=== Pool B ===
First Round
V Liparteliani (GEO)	0101
D Dolassem (CMR)	0003
A González (CUB)	1000
H Campos (ARG)	0000
K Kone (CIV)	0000
D Gerasimenko (SRB)	1000

Second Round
V Liparteliani (GEO)	0020
M Anthony (AUS)	0101
A González (CUB)	0011
D Gerasimenko (SRB)	0002

Quarterfinals
M Anthony (AUS)	0002
A González (CUB)	0010

=== Pool C ===
First Round		Second Round		Quarterfinals
M Nishiyama (JPN)	0110
C Mamedov (KGZ)	0000	M Nishiyama (JPN)	0010
H Mesbah (EGY)	0011	T Bolat (KAZ)	0000
T Bolat (KAZ)	1002			M Nishiyama (JPN)	0101
E Mammadov (AZE)	0111			D-N Song (KOR)	0111
C Lambert (GER)	0001	E Mammadov (AZE)	0000
D-N Song (KOR)	1001	D-N Song (KOR)	0011
J Romero (URU)	0000

=== Pool D ===
First Round
D Choriev (UZB)	0101
M Nyman (SWE)	0013
T Camilo (BRA)	1001
R Gontiuk (UKR)	0001
R Meloni (ITA)	0101
P Sobirov (TJK)	0013

Second Round
D Choriev (UZB)	1000
T Madarász (HUN)
T Camilo (BRA)	1011
R Meloni (ITA)	0001

Quarterfinals
D Choriev (UZB)	0002
T Camilo (BRA)	0010
