= Song Dae-nam =

South Korean judoka (born 1979)

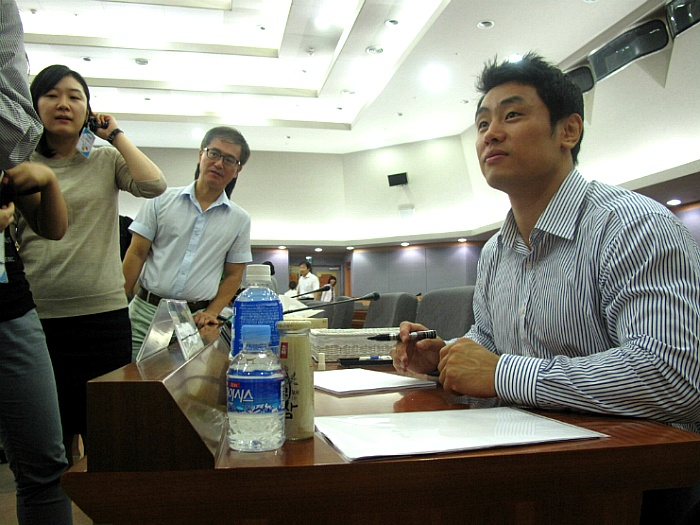
- Song at an event in 2012

Personal information
- Born: 5 April 1979 (age 47) Yongin, Gyeonggi Province, South Korea
- Home town: Seoul, South Korea
- Education: Cheongju University
- Occupation: Judoka
- Height: 178 cm (5 ft 10 in)

Sport
- Country: South Korea
- Sport: Judo
- Weight class: –81 kg, –90 kg
- Rank: 5th dan black belt
- Now coaching: South Korea Men's National Team (Head) An Chang-rim, Lee Seung-soo, Gwak Dong-han, Wang Ki-chun; Namyangju City Hall (Head) An Baul

Achievements and titles
- Olympic Games: (gold) (2012)
- World Champ.: R32 (2010, 2011)
- Highest world ranking: 5 (6 October 2012)
Medal record
Men's judo
Representing South Korea
Olympic Games
Gold medal – first place	2012 London	‍–‍90 kg
IJF Grand Slam
Gold medal – first place	2009 Paris	‍–‍81 kg
Silver medal – second place	2010 Moscow	‍–‍81 kg
Bronze medal – third place	2009 Moscow	‍–‍81 kg
IJF Grand Prix
Silver medal – second place	2012 Düsseldorf	‍–‍90 kg
Bronze medal – third place	2010 Düsseldorf	‍–‍81 kg
Bronze medal – third place	2011 Abu Dhabi	‍–‍90 kg

Profile at external databases
- IJF: 2165
- JudoInside.com: 31747
- Updated on 25 May 2023

Song Dae-Nam (Korean: 송대남; Korean pronunciation: [soŋ.dɛ̝.nam]; born 5 April 1979 in Yongin, Gyeonggi Province) is a former South Korean judoka.

Song rose to prominence when he won the gold medal in the middleweight division at the 2012 Olympics. He was then nominated as the flagbearer for Korea in the closing ceremony. He is best known as the head coach of the South Korea Men's National Team, having produced two world champions in his first year as head coach.

Song moved up a weight class from half-middleweight to middleweight in 2012 after constant defeats to teammate Kim Jae-bum and inability to qualify for the Olympics in 2008.

== Personal life ==
Song is an alumnus of Kumoh Elementary School, Kyung-min Middle School and Kyung-min High School.

Song served in the Republic of Korea Armed Forces as a sergeant, and represented them at the Military World Games in 2003, winning gold in the lightweight category.

A comic book has been written about Song's win at the Olympics.

== Competitive career ==
=== Beginnings: 2004–2006 ===
Song raised his weight from 73 kg to 81 kg as he transitioned to senior level. In his first international outing, he won the 2004 Rendez-vous Canada in Montreal. He then competed in the 2005 Kracup Korea Open in Jeju, and finished second.

Song's first high-level tournament was at the 2006 Jigoro Kano Cup in Tokyo, but lost to Japan's Hirotaka Kato in the final, settling for silver. He competed at the Super World Cup Tournoi de Paris a month later, losing to Italy's Giuseppe Maddaloni for his third consecutive silver. A week later, Song finally won at the World Cup in Vienna, beating France's Alain Schmitt. He continued his winning streak at the 2006 Kracup Korea Open, winning gold.

=== Failure to qualify for the Olympics: 2007–2008 ===
"When you become a winner it's important not to become complacent and when you become a loser it's important not be disappointed or frustrated."

— Song, on missing out on the Olympics

In 2007, Song participated at the Super World Cup in Paris, but lost in his first fight. He redeemed himself at his second Jigoro Kano Cup, surprisingly beating Takashi Ono in the final for gold.

In 2008, just months before the Olympics, Song competed in the Super World Cup in Paris again, but set-backs began as he lost in his second fight.

Song's second tournament would be a turning point in his career, as he lost to local half-lightweight number one and eventual 2008 Olympic silver medalist Kim Jae-bum at the Korea National Qualifiers in the finals by shido in golden score.

Post-Olympics, Song won two consecutive competitions, the International Judo Cup in Dubrovnik and Megion International Judo Tournament.

=== Continued losses in the half-middleweight: 2009–2010 ===
Song won his first Grand Slam in Paris, where he met long-time rival and teammate Kim in the final. He won the gold due to Kim's injury that led to a concession. He next participated at the Grand Slam in Moscow, where he participated in ippon judo in his first two fights. He lost by ippon to Belarus' Aliaksandr Stsiashenka in the semi-final, finishing fifth. Song redeemed himself at the World Cup in Ulaanbaatar, where he won the tournament. He beat Mongolia's Dashdavaa Gantumur in just 21 seconds by ippon in the final.

In 2010, Song competed in his first Masters at home ground in Suwon, but failed to medal, losing his second fight to Russia's Sirazhudin Magomedov by ippon. His losses continued to mount in the high level competitions, as he finished seventh at the Grand Slam in Paris, failing to defend his title. At the Grand Prix in Düsseldorf, Song again failed to medal, losing to prime rival Kim by waza-ari in golden score, after nearly eight minutes, in the semi-final. He remained on the losing end with his rivalry with Kim, losing in the final by ippon at the World Cup in Prague. Song won another silver medal at the Grand Slam in Moscow, losing to Russia's Ivan Nifontov with harai goshi by ippon in the final.

Song next participated in his first World Championships in Tokyo, which was his last competition as a half-middleweight. He was 31-years-old by then. He lost in his third fight to France's Loïc Pietri by waza-ari and ippon.

=== Transition to middleweight: 2011–2012 ===
Song moved up a weight class in 2011, returning to the Grand Slam in Moscow as a middleweight. Unfortunately, his losses carried over to his new weight division, losing in his second fight to Argentina's Héctor Campos by ippon and yuko.

In his second World Championships, he again crashed out early, losing to Brazil's Tiago Camilo narrowly by yuko in golden score.

Song eventually won at the World Cup in Ulaanbaatar, defeating Russia's Kirill Voprosov in the final by ippon. He then lost in the semi-final at the Grand Prix in Abu Dhabi to rising Georgian star Varlam Liparteliani by ippon in just 47 seconds.

Song managed to redeem himself at the World Cup in Suwon, winning all his fights by ippon, making the tournament his best in terms of performance.

At the Grand Slam in Tokyo, Song faced Voprosov in a revenge match in the quarter-final. He lost by ippon, finishing seventh place. His medal-less streak continued at the Grand Prix in Qingdao, narrowly losing to Mongolia's Enkhbat Erdenebileg by two yukos in the round of sixteen.

In 2012, Song continued to crash out early in tournaments just five months before the Olympics. He lost in the quarter-final of the Grand Slam in Paris to Ukraine's Roman Guntiuk by ippon. At the last tournament before the Olympics, Song came close to clinching a title, however narrowly lost by yuko to Liparteliani in the final.

En route to the final, Song beat former world champion Lee Kyu-won in the semi-final by ippon and outranked him in the Olympic qualifiers rankings, allowing Song to represent Korea in the middleweight division at the Olympics.

=== Breakthrough and retirement from Judo: 2012 Olympics ===
"I think all the athletes competing in the Olympic Games are equally capable of winning a gold medal and thanks to a lot of preparations I believe I was able to win." - Song on being an outsider for an Olympic medal, yet becoming the surprise champion

Six months before the Olympics, Song ranked number 25 in the world rankings. In May, he advanced to number 17, and entered the Olympics with this rank. He was seeded number 11.

Song's main skill was seoi nage, and used it to win en-course to the final. He was a complete surprise, reaching the final, and was set to face world number seven Asley González, who was ten years younger than him. He defeated Gonzalez in golden score with an unorthodox kouchi gari.

Song became the oldest Olympic gold medalist in judo, at age 33. He was one of the two South Korean Olympic champions at the tournament, with the other ironically being his old-time rival, Kim.

After the Olympics, Song ranked number five in the world, the highest in his career. He retired after the Olympics.

== Coaching career ==
"Don't be envious...Get the attention of all the cameras at the end of the Olympic Games." - Cho Jun-ho, assistant coach of the women's national team, on Song's best advice

Song returned to the South Korea National Team as a coach for the men's lightweight, half-middleweight and middleweight.

He has been promoted to head coach of the men's national team. His assistant coach is Olympic and world champion Choi Min-ho, who specializes in the extra and half-lightweights, and heavyweights.

He has a reputation as "good-looking", a "hulk", and a "tiger" at the Taeneung Athlete's Village. He is a strict coach who is much respected by his students.

Under Song, Korea has produced two world champions with An Baul and Gwak Dong-han, and bronze medalists Kim Won-jin and An Chang-rim.

Gwak was Song's training partner at the 2012 Olympics.

== Competitive record ==
Judo Record
Total	60
Wins	48
by Ippon	27
Losses	12
by Ippon	9

(does not include local tournaments and qualifiers)
