= Karolis Bauža =

Lithuanian judoka (born 1987)

Personal information
- Born: 24 April 1987 (age 39) Vilnius, Lithuanian SSR, Soviet Union
- Occupation: Judoka
- Height: 182 cm (6 ft 0 in)

Sport
- Country: Lithuania
- Sport: Judo
- Weight class: ‍–‍90 kg

Achievements and titles
- Olympic Games: R16 (2012)
- World Champ.: 7th (2013)
- European Champ.: (bronze) (2009, 2013)
Medal record
Men's judo
Representing Lithuania
European Championships
Bronze medal – third place	2009 Tbilisi	‍–‍90 kg
Bronze medal – third place	2013 Budapest	‍–‍90 kg
IJF Grand Slam
Bronze medal – third place	2010 Moscow	‍–‍90 kg
IJF Grand Prix
Bronze medal – third place	2011 Baku	‍–‍90 kg
Bronze medal – third place	2014 Zagreb	‍–‍90 kg
European U23 Championships
Gold medal – first place	2009 Antalya	‍–‍90 kg
Summer Universiade
Bronze medal – third place	2007 Bangkok	‍–‍90 kg
Bronze medal – third place	2015 Gwangju	Open

Profile at external databases
- IJF: 538
- JudoInside.com: 24106
- Updated on 14 November 2022

Karolis Bauža (born 24 April 1987) is a Lithuanian judoka from the city of Jurbarkas.

== Achievements ==
Year	Tournament	Place	Weight class
2007	Universiade	3rd	Middleweight (90 kg)
2009	European U23 Championships	1st	(90 kg)
2009	European Championships	3rd	(90 kg)
2010	European Championships	5th	(90 kg)
2012	Olympic Games	9T	(90 kg)
2013	European Championships	3rd	(90 kg)
