= Milan Randl =

Slovak judoka (born 1987)

Personal information
- Born: 24 April 1987 (age 39)
- Occupation: Judoka

Sport
- Country: Slovakia
- Sport: Judo
- Weight class: ‍–‍90 kg

Achievements and titles
- Olympic Games: R32 (2012)
- World Champ.: 5th (2009)
- European Champ.: 5th (2011)
Medal record
Men's judo
Representing Slovakia
IJF Grand Slam
Bronze medal – third place	2012 Moscow	‍–‍90 kg
IJF Grand Prix
Bronze medal – third place	2010 Rotterdam	‍–‍90 kg
Bronze medal – third place	2019 Montreal	‍–‍90 kg
European U23 Championships
Silver medal – second place	2009 Antalya	‍–‍90 kg
European Junior Championships
Bronze medal – third place	2006 Tallinn	‍–‍81 kg
European Cadet Championships
Gold medal – first place	2003 Baku	‍–‍81 kg

Profile at external databases
- IJF: 733
- JudoInside.com: 22027
- Updated on 27 November 2022

Milan Randl (born 24 April 1987 in Bratislava, Slovakia) is a Slovak judoka. He competed at the 2012 Summer Olympics in the ‍–‍90 kg event.

== Career ==
Randl started judo at the age of 7 in Pezinok under the guidance of Jozef Tománek. Since 2009, he has been training at the Dukla Army Sports Center in Banská Bystrica under the guidance of Marek Matuszek. He has been a member of the Slovak men's national team since 2005 in the light middleweight and middleweight (up to 90 kg) categories. In 2008, he did not qualify for the Summer Olympics in Beijing. In 2012, he qualified for the London Olympics, where he was defeated by Ilias Iliadis from Greece in the opening round. Since 2016, he has alternated between middleweight and light heavyweight up to 100 kg. In the same year, he did not gain enough points to qualify for the Rio Olympics.
