= Rich Lackner =

American football player and coach (born 1956)

Biographical details
- Born: July 28, 1956 (age 70); Pittsburgh, Pennsylvania, U.S.

Playing career
- 1975–1978: Carnegie Mellon
- Position: Linebacker

Coaching career (HC unless noted)
- 1979–1981: Carnegie Mellon (LB)
- 1982–1983: Carnegie Mellon (OL)
- 1984–1985: Carnegie Mellon (OC/OL)
- 1986–2021: Carnegie Mellon

Head coaching record
- Overall: 234–125–2
- Bowls: 3–4
- Tournaments: 1–2 (NCAA D-III playoffs)

Accomplishments and honors

Championships
- 2 PAC (1989, 2021); 8 UAA (1990–1991, 1993–1997, 2006)

Awards
- 5× UAA Coach of the Year (1990–1991, 1993, 1997, 2006); Bob Prince Award (2003); All-South Region Coach of the Year (2006)

Rich Lackner (born July 28, 1956) is an American former college football coach. He served as the head football coach at Carnegie Mellon University from 1986 to 2021, compiling a record of 234–125–2.

== Playing career ==
A Pittsburgh native, Lackner graduated with honors from Mt. Lebanon High School, one of Pennsylvania's perennial high school football powers. As a senior, he led Mt. Lebanon to the WPIAL Class AAA title game with a 9–2 record.

Lackner had an exceptional athletic and academic career at Carnegie Mellon. A four-year starter at linebacker, he was a three-time All-Presidents' Athletic Conference pick as well as the PAC's 1976 Defensive Player-of-the-Year. In 1978, Lackner was named to the Pittsburgh Press All-District Team and received a Pittsburgh Post-Gazette Dapper Dan Award. Also a model student, he was twice named an Academic All-American.

During his playing career, Carnegie Mellon had a four-year mark of 28–7–1 and won PAC titles in 1977 and 1978. The Tartans advanced to the NCAA Division III playoffs in 1978, marking their first postseason appearance since the 1939 Sugar Bowl.

== Coaching career ==
Following his 1979 graduation from Carnegie Mellon with a bachelor's degree in history, Lackner remained with head coach Chuck Klausing as an assistant coach. Seven years later, Lackner was named head coach when Klausing left to join Mike Gottfried's staff at the University of Pittsburgh.

=== Carnegie Mellon ===
Named head coach in 1986, Lackner directed the Tartans to nine conference championships and three NCAA playoff berths. Lackner passed Walter Steffen, who guided Carnegie Tech to an 88–53–8 mark from 1914 to 1932, as the winningest coach in school history on September 19, 1998, when the Tartans defeated Bethany College, 38–7.

Carnegie Mellon rose to unprecedented prominence in the University Athletic Association (UAA) under Lackner. The Tartans own eight UAA titles and have an impressive conference record of 45–16 (.738). Lackner was named the UAA Coach of the Year five times, in 1990, 1991, 1993, 1997, and, most recently, in 2006 after leading the Tartans to an 11–1 season, the most wins in school history and their sixth appearance in the NCAA playoffs. He was also named All-South Region Coach of the Year by D3football.com in 2006. In May 2003, Lackner was inducted into the Western Pennsylvania Hall of Fame. He was also awarded the Bob Prince Award during the Catholic Youth Organization's 29th annual dinner.

== Family ==
Lackner and his late wife, Cindy, have two children.

== Head coaching record ==
Year	Team	Overall	Conference	Standing	Bowl/playoffs
Carnegie Mellon Tartans (Presidents' Athletic Conference) (1986–1989)
1986	Carnegie Mellon	6–3	4–2	T–2nd	
1987	Carnegie Mellon	7–2–1	4–2	3rd	
1988	Carnegie Mellon	5–4–1	2–3–1	T–4th	
1989	Carnegie Mellon	7–3	4–1	T–1st	
Carnegie Mellon Tartans (University Athletic Association) (1990–2013)
1990	Carnegie Mellon	10–1	4–0	1st	L NCAA Division III First Round
1991	Carnegie Mellon	9–1	4–0	1st	
1992	Carnegie Mellon	7–2	3–1		
1993	Carnegie Mellon	8–2	4–0	1st	
1994	Carnegie Mellon	7–3	3–1	T–1st	
1995	Carnegie Mellon	7–3	3–1	T–1st	
1996	Carnegie Mellon	7–3	3–1	T–1st	
1997	Carnegie Mellon	8–2	4–0	1st	
1998	Carnegie Mellon	7–3			
1999	Carnegie Mellon	8–3			W ECAC
2000	Carnegie Mellon	6–4			
2001	Carnegie Mellon	7–2			
2002	Carnegie Mellon	5–5			
2003	Carnegie Mellon	6–4			
2004	Carnegie Mellon	6–4			
2005	Carnegie Mellon	5–5	1–2		
2006	Carnegie Mellon	11–1	3–0	1st	L NCAA Division III Second Round
2007	Carnegie Mellon	7–4	2–1		W ECAC Southwest
2008	Carnegie Mellon	5–5	1–2		
2009	Carnegie Mellon	5–5	1–2		
2010	Carnegie Mellon	4–6	0–3	4th	
2011	Carnegie Mellon	5–5	1–2		
2012	Carnegie Mellon	6–5	1–2	3rd	L ECAC Southwest
2013	Carnegie Mellon	3–7	0–3	4th	
Carnegie Mellon Tartans (Presidents' Athletic Conference) (2014–2021)
2014	Carnegie Mellon	4–6	3–5	T–7th	
2015	Carnegie Mellon	8–3	6–2	T–3rd	W ECAC Legacy Bowl
2016	Carnegie Mellon	7–4	6–2	T–3rd	L ECAC Legacy Bowl
2017	Carnegie Mellon	7–4	5–3	T–4th	L ECAC Asa S. Bushnell Bowl
2018	Carnegie Mellon	6–4	5–4	T–5th	
2019	Carnegie Mellon	8–3	7–2	T–2nd	L ECAC Scotty Whitelaw Bowl
2020–21	Carnegie Mellon	2–2	1–2	T–6th	
2021	Carnegie Mellon	8–2	8–1	T–1st	C (Note: Carnegie Mellon advanced to the NCAA Division III Football Championship playoffs in 2021, but withdrew from the tournament the day before their first round game against North Central (IL) due to a number of positive COVID-19 tests among members of the team.) NCAA Division III First Round
Carnegie Mellon:		234–125–2			
Total:		234–125–2			
National championship Conference title Conference division title or championship game berth

== See also ==
- List of college football career coaching wins leaders
