= Masashi Nishiyama =

Japanese judoka

Personal information
- Nationality: Japanese
- Born: 9 July 1985 (age 40) Shimonoseki, Yamaguchi
- Occupation: Judoka
- Height: 178 cm (5 ft 10 in)
- Website: www.judoinside.com/uk/?factfile%2Fview%2F37687%2Fmasashi_ebinuma

Sport
- Country: Japan
- Sport: Judo
- Weight class: –90 kg

Achievements and titles
- Olympic Games: (bronze) (2012)
- World Champ.: R32 (2013)
- Asian Champ.: (gold) (2009)
Medal record
Men's judo
Representing Japan
Olympic Games
Bronze medal – third place	2012 London	‍–‍90 kg
Asian Championships
Gold medal – first place	2009 Taipei	‍–‍90 kg
World Masters
Gold medal – first place	2012 Almaty	‍–‍90 kg
IJF Grand Slam
Gold medal – first place	2010 Tokyo	‍–‍90 kg
Gold medal – first place	2011 Tokyo	‍–‍90 kg
Silver medal – second place	2012 Tokyo	‍–‍90 kg
Bronze medal – third place	2008 Tokyo	‍–‍90 kg
IJF Grand Prix
Gold medal – first place	2011 Qingdao	‍–‍90 kg
Bronze medal – third place	2011 Düsseldorf	‍–‍90 kg

Profile at external databases
- IJF: 2207
- JudoInside.com: 57957
- Updated on 25 May 2023

Masashi Nishiyama (西山将士, Nishiyama Masashi; born 9 July 1985) is a Japanese judoka who won a bronze medal at the 2012 Summer Olympics. He is competing for the Nippon Steel Corporation Judo Club.

== Biography ==
Nishiyama was born in Shimonoseki, Yamaguchi Prefecture and graduated from the Kokushikan University in Tokyo. In the early 2000s he was competing in the 100 kg category but then moved to the 90 kg division.

== Competitions ==
Nishiyama was defeated in the selection competitions for the 2012 London Olympics, but nevertheless was selected for the national team. In London, he was defeated in the quarter-finals, and won the bronze medal via repechage, against Kirill Denisov, by judges decision.
