= Kinapeya Kone =

Ivorian judoka (born 1979)

Personal information
- Full name: Kinapeya Romeo Kone
- Nationality: Ivory Coast
- Born: 1 September 1979 (age 46) Korhogo, Ivory Coast
- Occupation: Judoka
- Height: 180 cm (5.9 ft)
- Weight: 90 kg (200 lb)

Sport
- Sport: Judo
Medal record
Men's Judo
Representing Ivory Coast
All-Africa Games
Bronze medal – third place	2011 Maputo	-90 kg

Profile at external databases
- JudoInside.com: 47314

Kinapeya Romeo Kone (born 1 September 1979 in Korhogo, Ivory Coast) is an Ivorian judoka. He competed at the 2012 Summer Olympics in the men's 90 kg event.
