= Chuck Klausing =

American football player and coach (1925–2018)

Biographical details
- Born: April 19, 1925; Wilmerding, Pennsylvania, U.S.
- Died: February 15, 2018 (aged 92); Indiana, Pennsylvania, U.S.

Playing career
- 1943–1944: Penn State
- 1946–1947: Slippery Rock
- Position: Center

Coaching career (HC unless noted)
- 1948–1953: Pitcairn HS (PA)
- 1954–1959: Braddock HS (PA)
- 1960: Rutgers (freshmen)
- 1961–1963: Army (assistant)
- 1964–1969: Indiana (PA)
- 1970–1972: West Virginia (AHC)
- 1973–1975: West Virginia (AHC/DC)
- 1976–1985: Carnegie Mellon
- 1986: Pittsburgh (AHC/OLB)
- 1987–1993: Kiski School (PA)

Head coaching record
- Overall: 124–25–2 (college)
- Bowls: 0–1
- Tournaments: 2–4 (NCAA D-III playoffs)

Accomplishments and honors

Championships
- 6 PAC (1977–1979, 1981, 1983 1985); 2 PSCAC Western Division (1964–1965)
- College Football Hall of Fame; Inducted in 1998 (profile)

Chuck Klausing (April 19, 1925 – February 15, 2018) was an American football player and coach. He served as the head football coach at Indiana University of Pennsylvania from 1964 to 1969 and at Carnegie Mellon University from 1976 to 1985, compiling a career college football record of 124–25–2. Klausing's 1968 IUP Indians team played in the Boardwalk Bowl, losing to Delaware. He was inducted into the College Football Hall of Fame as a coach in 1998. He retired as the 19th winningest coach in NCAA football history.

== Coaching career ==
Klausing was the head football coach at Pitcairn High School from 1948 to 1953 and Braddock High School from 1954 through 1959, where his teams won an unprecedented six consecutive Western Pennsylvania Interscholastic Athletic League (WPIAL) championships. His six teams at Braddock went 54–0–1 during that period. They broke the national undefeated record set by Massillon Washington High School.

Klausing was head coach at Carnegie Mellon University from 1976 to 1985, winning six conference championships and making the NCAA Division III playoffs four times. He won the National Coach of the Year award by ABC-TV in 1979 and TBS in 1983.

== Head coaching record ==
=== College ===
Year	Team	Overall	Conference	Standing	Bowl/playoffs
Indiana Indians (Pennsylvania State College Athletic Conference) (1964–1965)
1964	Indiana	8–2	6–0	1st (West)	
1965	Indiana	8-2	6-0 (includes Edinboro forfeit)	1st (West)	
Indiana Indians (NCAA College Division independent) (1966–1969)
1966	Indiana	7–2			
1967	Indiana	8–1			
1968	Indiana	9–1 (ranked #2 in the NCAA college division)			L Boardwalk Bowl
1969	Indiana	8–1			
Indiana:		47–10	10–2		
Carnegie Mellon Tartans (Presidents' Athletic Conference) (1976–1985)
1976	Carnegie Mellon	6–1–1	5–1–1	2nd	
1977	Carnegie Mellon	8–1	7–0	1st	
1978	Carnegie Mellon	9–2	6–1	1st	L NCAA Division III Semifinal
1979	Carnegie Mellon	10–1	7–0	1st	L NCAA Division III Semifinal
1980	Carnegie Mellon	8–1	6–1	2nd	
1981	Carnegie Mellon	7–1–1	6–0–1	1st	
1982	Carnegie Mellon	6–3	4–3	T–3rd	
1983	Carnegie Mellon	9–1 (Ranked #2 in NCAA Division III)	7–0	1st	L NCAA Division III Quarterfinal
1984	Carnegie Mellon	6–3	5–1	2nd	
1985	Carnegie Mellon	8–1	6–0	1st	L NCAA Division III First Round
Carnegie Mellon:		77–15–2	59–7–2		
Total:		124–25–2			
National championship Conference title Conference division title or championship game berth
