= Valentyn Grekov =

Ukrainian judoka (born 1976)

Personal information
- Born: 18 April 1976 (age 50)
- Occupation: Judoka
- Height: 183 cm (6 ft 0 in)

Sport
- Country: Ukraine
- Sport: Judo
- Weight class: ‍–‍90 kg

Achievements and titles
- Olympic Games: R16 (2004)
- World Champ.: 5th (2010)
- European Champ.: (gold) (2002, 2003, 2007)
Medal record
Men's judo
Representing Ukraine
European Championships
Gold medal – first place	2002 Maribor	‍–‍90 kg
Gold medal – first place	2003 Düsseldorf	‍–‍90 kg
Gold medal – first place	2007 Belgrade	‍–‍90 kg
Bronze medal – third place	2004 Bucharest	‍–‍90 kg
IJF Grand Slam
Silver medal – second place	2013 Baku	‍–‍90 kg
IJF Grand Prix
Silver medal – second place	2009 Tunis	‍–‍90 kg

Profile at external databases
- IJF: 671
- JudoInside.com: 7448
- Updated on 16 November 2022

Valentyn Grekov (Ukrainian: Валентин Анатолійович Греков; born 18 April 1976 in Dnipro, Ukraine) is a Ukrainian judoka. He is a three-time European judo champion.

== Achievements ==
Year	Tournament	Place	Weight class
2007	European Judo Championships	1st	Middleweight (90 kg)
2005	European Judo Championships	7th	Middleweight (90 kg)
2004	European Judo Championships	3rd	Middleweight (90 kg)
2003	European Judo Championships	1st	Middleweight (90 kg)
2002	European Judo Championships	1st	Middleweight (90 kg)
2001	European Judo Championships	7th	Middleweight (90 kg)
2001	Summer Universiade	5th	Middleweight (90 kg)
2000	European Judo Championships	5th	Middleweight (90 kg)
