= Mark Anthony (judoka) =

Australian Olympic judoka

Personal information
- Height: 187 cm (6 ft 2 in)
- Weight: 81 kg (179 lb)

Sport
- Sport: Judo
- Club: Caulfield Judo Club

Mark Anthony (born 13 October 1989 in Malang, Indonesia) is an Australian judoka. He lives in Geelong, Australia. He competed in the – 81 kg event at the 2008 Summer Olympics in Beijing and lost his first match against Mario Valles. Four years later, he took part in the – 90 kg tournament at the 2012 Summer Olympics and lost in the repechage to Ilias Iliadis. He has been Australian Judo Champion on four occasions.
