= Ilias Iliadis (judoka) =

Greek judoka (born 1986)

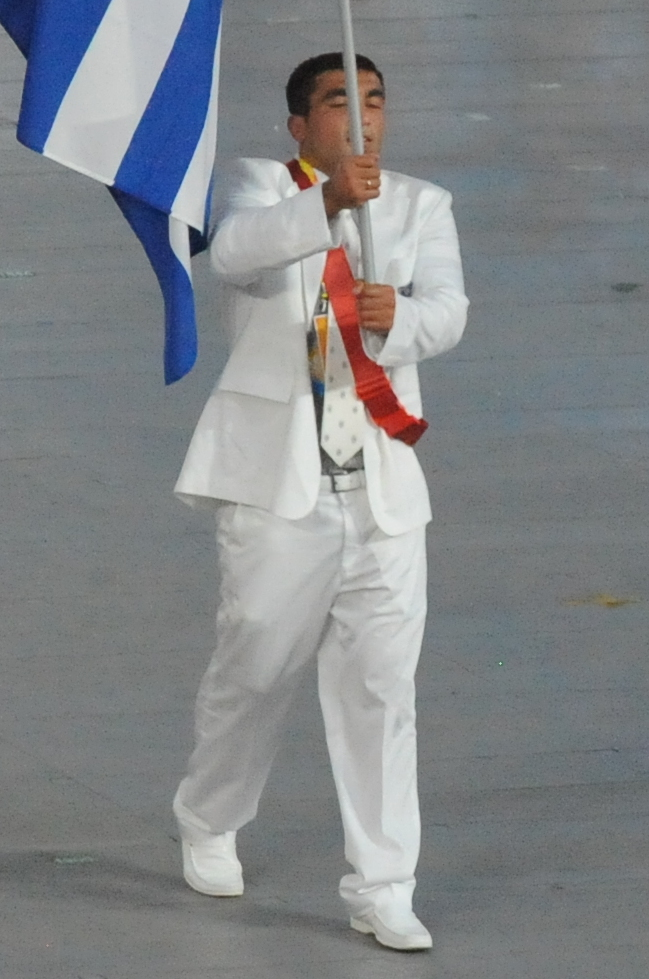
- Iliadis at the 2008 Olympics Parade of Nations

Personal information
- Born: Jarji Zviadauri; 10 November 1986 (age 39) Akhmeta, Kakheti, Georgian SSR, USSR (modern Georgia)
- Occupation: Judoka

Sport
- Country: Greece
- Sport: Judo
- Weight class: –81 kg, –90 kg
- Rank: 4th dan black belt
- Now coaching: Saudi Arabia National Team

Achievements and titles
- Olympic Games: (gold) (2004)
- World Champ.: (gold) (2010, 2011, 2014)
- European Champ.: (gold) (2004, 2011)
Medal record
Men's judo
Representing Greece
Olympic Games
Gold medal – first place	2004 Athens	‍–‍81 kg
Bronze medal – third place	2012 London	‍–‍90 kg
World Championships
Gold medal – first place	2010 Tokyo	‍–‍90 kg
Gold medal – first place	2011 Paris	‍–‍90 kg
Gold medal – first place	2014 Chelyabinsk	‍–‍90 kg
Silver medal – second place	2005 Cairo	‍–‍90 kg
Silver medal – second place	2007 Rio de Janeiro	‍–‍90 kg
Bronze medal – third place	2013 Rio de Janeiro	‍–‍90 kg
European Games
Bronze medal – third place	2015 Baku	‍–‍90 kg
European Championships
Gold medal – first place	2004 Bucharest	‍–‍81 kg
Gold medal – first place	2011 Istanbul	‍–‍90 kg
Bronze medal – third place	2010 Vienna	‍–‍90 kg
World Masters
Gold medal – first place	2013 Tyumen	‍–‍90 kg
Silver medal – second place	2011 Baku	‍–‍90 kg
IJF Grand Slam
Gold medal – first place	2011 Moscow	‍–‍90 kg
Gold medal – first place	2012 Moscow	‍–‍90 kg
Silver medal – second place	2012 Tokyo	‍–‍100 kg
IJF Grand Prix
Gold medal – first place	2014 Düsseldorf	‍–‍90 kg
Silver medal – second place	2013 Jeju	‍–‍90 kg
Bronze medal – third place	2013 Düsseldorf	‍–‍90 kg
Bronze medal – third place	2015 Jeju	‍–‍90 kg
European U23 Championships
Gold medal – first place	2003 Yerevan	‍–‍73 kg
Gold medal – first place	2006 Moscow	‍–‍100 kg
European Junior Championships
Bronze medal – third place	2002 Rotterdam	‍–‍73 kg
European Cadet Championships
Gold medal – first place	2002 Győr	‍–‍73 kg
Mediterranean Games
Gold medal – first place	2005 Almeria	‍–‍90 kg
Gold medal – first place	2009 Pescara	‍–‍90 kg

Profile at external databases
- IJF: 836
- JudoInside.com: 12544
- Updated on 25 May 2023

Ilias Iliadis (Greek: Ηλίας Ηλιάδης, born Jarji Zviadauri, Georgian: ჯარჯი ზვიადაური, on 10 November 1986) is a Georgian-born Greek judoka. He was named the 2014 Greek Male Athlete of the Year.

He won a gold medal in the half-middleweight (81 kg) division at the 2004 Summer Olympics in Athens at age 17. Illiadis also won a gold medal 6 years later at the 2010 World Judo Championships in Tokyo in the −90 kg category.

As Greece's flagbearer, he had the honour of being the first athlete to march into the Bird's Nest Stadium during the opening ceremony of the 2008 Summer Olympics in Beijing.

Iliadis is a cousin of another Olympic champion, Georgian judoka Zurab Zviadauri, who also won gold at the 2004 Summer Olympics. Iliadis's family moved to Greece in 2003. He was adopted by Nikos Iliadis.

Since November 2019 Iliadis works as head coach for the Uzbek national team.

== Achievements ==
Year	Tournament	Venue	Place	Weight class
2004	Olympic Games	Athens, Greece	1st	Half middleweight (81 kg)
2004	European Judo Championships	Bucharest, Romania	1st	Half middleweight (81 kg)
2005	World Judo Championships	Cairo, Egypt	2nd	Middleweight (90 kg)
2005	Mediterranean Games	Almeria, Spain	1st	Middleweight (90 kg)
2007	World Judo Championships	Rio de Janeiro, Brazil	2nd	Middleweight (90 kg)
2008	Olympic Games	Beijing, China	20th	Middleweight (90 kg)
2009	Mediterranean Games	Pescara, Italy	1st	Middleweight (90 kg)
2010	World Judo Championships	Tokyo, Japan	1st	Middleweight (90 kg)
2010	European Judo Championships	Vienna, Austria	3rd	Middleweight (90 kg)
2011	European Judo Championships	Istanbul, Turkey	1st	Middleweight (90 kg)
2011	World Judo Championships	Paris, France	1st	Middleweight (90 kg)
2012	Olympic Games	London, England	3rd	Middleweight (90 kg)
2013	World Judo Championships	Rio de Janeiro, Brazil	3rd	Middleweight (90 kg)
2014	World Judo Championships	Chelyabinsk, Russia	1st	Middleweight (90 kg)
2015	European Games	Baku, Azerbaijan	3rd	Middleweight (90 kg)
2016	Olympic Games	Rio de Janeiro, Brazil	17th	Middleweight (90 kg)

Olympic Games
Preceded by Pyrros Dimas	Flagbearer for Greece; Beijing 2008	Succeeded by Alexandros Nikolaidis
