= Alexandre Émond =

Canadian judoka (born 1984)

Personal information
- Nationality: Canada
- Born: 25 May 1984 (age 42) Laval, Quebec, Canada
- Occupation: Judoka

Sport
- Sport: Judo
- Weight class: 81 kg
Medal record
Men's Judo
Representing Canada
Pan American Games
Bronze medal – third place	2011 Guadalajara	–81 kg
Pan American Championships
Gold medal – first place	2009 Buenos Aires	–81 kg
Gold medal – first place	2012 Montreal	–81 kg
Silver medal – second place	2011 Guadalajara	–81 kg
Bronze medal – third place	2008 Miami	–90 kg
Bronze medal – third place	2010 San Salvador	–81 kg
Bronze medal – third place	2013 San José	–81 kg

Profile at external databases
- IJF: 128
- JudoInside.com: 13254

Alexandre Émond (born 25 May 1984 in Laval, Quebec) is a Canadian judoka. He competed at the 2012 Summer Olympics in the 90 kg event and was eliminated in the first round by the British judoka Winston Gordon. Émond has enjoyed success at the Pan American Judo Championships winning two gold, one silver and two bronze medals between 2008 and 2012. He also won the bronze medal at the 2011 Pan American Games.

== See also ==
- Judo in Quebec
- Judo in Canada
- List of Canadian judoka
