= Ryan Larsen =

American football coach (born 1986)

Current position
- Title: Head coach
- Team: Carnegie Mellon
- Conference: Centennial
- Record: 41–11

Biographical details
- Born: October 18, 1986 (age 40); Chicago, Illinois, U.S.
- Education: Claremont McKenna College (2009); Indiana University Bloomington (2010)

Playing career
- 2005–2008: Claremont-Mudd-Scripps
- Position: Quarterback

Coaching career (HC unless noted)
- 2009: Indiana (intern)
- 2010: Indiana (OQC)
- 2011: Wabash (WR)
- 2012–2013: Rhodes (WR)
- 2014: Rhodes (OC/QB)
- 2015–2018: Stevenson (OC/QB)
- 2019–2021: Columbia (QB)
- 2022–present: Carnegie Mellon

Head coaching record
- Overall: 41–11
- Bowls: 2–0
- Tournaments: 2–2 (NCAA D-III playoffs)

Accomplishments and honors

Championships
- 2 PAC (2022, 2024)

Ryan Larsen (born October 18, 1986) is an American college football coach. He is the head football coach for Carnegie Mellon University, a position he has since 2022. He also coached for Indiana, Wabash, Rhodes, Stevenson, and Columbia. He played college football for Claremont-Mudd-Scripps as a quarterback.

== Head coaching record ==
Year	Team	Overall	Conference	Standing	Bowl/playoffs	D3^{#}	AFCA^{°}
Carnegie Mellon Tartans (Presidents' Athletic Conference) (2022–2024)
2022	Carnegie Mellon	11–1	8–0	1st	L NCAA Division III Second Round	14	14
2023	Carnegie Mellon	10–1	9–1	2nd	W Asa S. Bushnell	25	
2024	Carnegie Mellon	10–2	9–1	T–1st	L NCAA Division III Third Round	15	14
Carnegie Mellon Tartans (Centennial Conference) (2025–present)
2025	Carnegie Mellon	6–5	3–4	T–4th	W Centennial–MAC		
2026	Carnegie Mellon	4-2	3-0				
Carnegie Mellon:		41-11	32-6				
Total:		41-11					
National championship Conference title Conference division title or championship game berth
