= Lee Kyu-won =

South Korean judoka (born 1989)

Personal information
- Born: 14 February 1989 (age 37)
- Occupation: Judoka

Korean name
- Hangul: 이규원
- Hanja: 李奎遠
- RR: I Gyuwon
- MR: I Kyuwŏn

Sport
- Country: South Korea
- Sport: Judo
- Weight class: ‍–‍90 kg

Achievements and titles
- World Champ.: (2009)
- Asian Champ.: (gold) (2011)
Medal record
Men's judo
Representing South Korea
World Championships
Gold medal – first place	2009 Rotterdam	‍–‍90 kg
Asian Games
Gold medal – first place	2014 Incheon	Men's team
Bronze medal – third place	2010 Guangzhou	‍–‍90 kg
Asian Championships
Gold medal – first place	2011 Abu Dhabi	‍–‍90 kg
World Masters
Bronze medal – third place	2010 Suwon	‍–‍90 kg
IJF Grand Slam
Gold medal – first place	2012 Tokyo	‍–‍90 kg
Gold medal – first place	2014 Paris	‍–‍90 kg
Silver medal – second place	2008 Tokyo	‍–‍90 kg
Silver medal – second place	2013 Tokyo	‍–‍90 kg
Bronze medal – third place	2011 Tokyo	‍–‍90 kg
IJF Grand Prix
Bronze medal – third place	2012 Düsseldorf	‍–‍90 kg
Bronze medal – third place	2014 Jeju	‍–‍90 kg
Asian Junior Championships
Bronze medal – third place	2007 Hyderabad	‍–‍90 kg
Summer Universiade
Bronze medal – third place	2009 Belgrade	‍–‍90 kg

Profile at external databases
- IJF: 67
- JudoInside.com: 50343
- Updated on 13 August 2023

Lee Kyu-won (Korean: 이규원; Hanja: 李奎遠, born 14 February 1989) is a male judoka from South Korea, whose biggest success so far was winning the world title at the age of 19 at the 2009 World Championships in Rotterdam, Netherlands.
