= Chingiz Mamedov =

Kyrgyzstani judoka (born 1989)

Personal information
- Born: 19 July 1989 (age 37) Shu, Jambyl, Kazakh SSR, USSR (modern Kazakhstan)
- Occupation: Judoka

Sport
- Country: Kyrgyzstan
- Sport: Judo
- Weight class: ‍–‍90 kg, ‍–‍100 kg

Achievements and titles
- Olympic Games: R32 (2012)
- World Champ.: 7th (2015)
- Asian Champ.: (bronze) (2012)
Medal record
Men's judo
Representing Kyrgyzstan
Asian Championships
Bronze medal – third place	2012 Tashkent	‍–‍90 kg
IJF Grand Prix
Bronze medal – third place	2010 Abu Dhabi	‍–‍90 kg

Profile at external databases
- IJF: 146
- JudoInside.com: 47533
- Updated on 2 January 2023

Chingiz Mamedov (born 9 July 1989) is a Kyrgyzstani judoka who competes in the ‍–‍90 kg category. He was flag bearer at the 2012 Summer Olympics. He was 3 times Kyrgyz National Champion (2007 & 2008 ‍–‍81 kg, and 2010 ‍–‍90 kg)

Olympic Games
Preceded by Talant Dzhanagulov	Flagbearer for Kyrgyzstan; London 2012	Succeeded by Erkin Adylbek Uulu
