= 2010 World Judo Championships – Women's 70 kg =

Judo competition

Judo Women's 70 kg at the 2010 World Judo Championships
- Venue: Yoyogi National Gymnasium
- Location: Tokyo, Japan
- Date: 10 September 2010
- Competitors: 35 from 28 nations

Medalists
gold medal	Lucie Décosse (1st title)	France
silver medal	Anett Meszaros	Hungary
bronze medal	Yoriko Kunihara	Japan
bronze medal	Raša Sraka	Slovenia

Competition at external databases
- Links: IJF • JudoInside

The Women's 70 kg competition at the 2010 World Judo Championships was held at 10 September at the Yoyogi National Gymnasium in Tokyo, Japan. 35 competitors contested for the medals, being split in 4 Pools where the winner advanced to the medal round.

== Pool A ==
First Round		Semifinals		Final
(Hungary) Anett Meszaros	001
(United Kingdom) Megan Fletcher	000	(Hungary) Anett Meszaros	002
(China) Chen Fei	111	(China) Chen Fei	000
(Kazakhstan) Marian Urdabayeva	000			(Hungary) Anett Meszaros	010
(Tunisia) Houda Miled	010			(Spain) Cecilia Blanco	000
(Italy) Erica Barbieri	101	(Italy) Erica Barbieri	000
(Spain) Cecilia Blanco	020	(Spain) Cecilia Blanco	010
(Ukraine) Nataliya Smal	000

== Pool B ==
- Last 16 fight: (Australia) Moira de Villiers 000 vs. (Canada) Kelita Zupancic 100

First Round		Semifinals		Final
(South Korea) Hwang Ye-Sul	001
(Brazil) Maria Portela	000	(South Korea) Hwang Ye-Sul	001
(France) Mylene Chollet	100	(France) Mylene Chollet	000
(Germany) Iljana Marzok	000			(South Korea) Hwang Ye-Sul	000
(Netherlands) Edith Bosch	011			(Netherlands) Edith Bosch	001
(Canada) Kelita Zupancic	000	(Netherlands) Edith Bosch	100
(United States) Kathleen Sell	101	(United States) Kathleen Sell	000
(Philippines) Karen Ann Solomon	000

== Pool C ==
- Last 16 fight: (United States) Laquinta Allen 100 vs. (Pakistan) Fouzia Mumtaz 000

First Round		Semifinals		Final
(France) Lucie Décosse	010
(China) Zhang Meiling	000	(France) Lucie Décosse	101
(Germany) Kerstin Thiele	000	(Russia) Margarita Gurtsieva	000
(Russia) Margarita Gurtsieva	100			(France) Lucie Décosse	101
(Slovenia) Raša Sraka	020			(Slovenia) Raša Sraka	000
(United States) Laquinta Allen	000	(Slovenia) Raša Sraka	100
(Mongolia) Naranjargal Tsend-Ayush	110	(Mongolia) Naranjargal Tsend-Ayush	000
(Chinese Taipei) Lai Chia-Miao	000

== Pool D ==
- Last 16 fight: (Thailand) Patcharee Pichaipat 000 vs. (South Korea) Choi Mi-Young 110

First Round		Semifinals		Final
(Japan) Yoriko Kunihara	100
(Angola) Antonia Moreira	000	(Japan) Yoriko Kunihara	020
(El Salvador) Veronica Mendoza	000	(Poland) Katarzyna Klys	002
(Poland) Katarzyna Klys	100			(Japan) Yoriko Kunihara	010
(Japan) Mina Watanabe	100			(Japan) Mina Watanabe	000
(Cuba) Onix Cortés	000	(Japan) Mina Watanabe	020
(United Kingdom) Sally Conway	002	(United Kingdom) Sally Conway	000
(South Korea) Choi Mi-Young	000

== Repechage ==
Repechage		Third place
(Spain) Cecilia Blanco	101
(South Korea) Ye-Sul Hwang	000	(Spain) Cecilia Blanco	000
		(Japan) Yoriko Kunihara	001

Repechage		Third place
(Slovenia) Raša Sraka	100
(Japan) Mina Watanabe	000	(Slovenia) Raša Sraka	001
		(Netherlands) Edith Bosch	000

== Finals ==
Semi-finals
(Hungary) Anett Meszaros	001
(Netherlands) Edith Bosch	000
(France) Lucie Décosse	002
(Japan) Mina Watanabe	000

Final
(Hungary) Anett Meszaros	000
(France) Lucie Décosse	100
