= 2011 World Judo Championships – Women's 70 kg =

Judo competition

Judo Women's 70 kg at the 2011 World Judo Championships
- Venue: Accor Arena
- Location: Paris, France
- Date: 26 August 2011
- Competitors: 47 from 39 nations

Medalists
gold medal	Lucie Décosse (2nd title)	France
silver medal	Edith Bosch	Netherlands
bronze medal	Yoriko Kunihara	Japan
bronze medal	Anett Mészáros	Hungary

Competition at external databases
- Links: IJF • JudoInside

The women's 70 kg competition of the 2011 World Judo Championships was held on August 26.

== Medalists ==
Gold	Silver	Bronze
Lucie Décosse (FRA)	Edith Bosch (NED)	Yoriko Kunihara (JPN); Anett Mészáros (HUN)

== Results ==
=== Pool A ===
First Round
(France) Lucie Décosse	101
(Angola) Antonia Moreira	000
(Algeria) Kahina Haddid	001
(Russia) Anastasia Gubadova	100
(South Korea) Choi Mi-Young	000
(Germany) Iljana Marzok	101
(United States) Kathleen Sell	001
(Kazakhstan) Zhanar Zhanzunova	000

Quarterfinals
(France) Lucie Décosse	100
(Netherlands) Linda Bolder	000
(Russia) Anastasia Gubadova	100
(Ukraine) Tetyana Savenko	000
(Colombia) Yuri Alvear	000
(Germany) Iljana Marzok	111
(United States) Kathleen Sell	000
(North Korea) Sol Kyong	100

Semifinals
(France) Lucie Décosse	100
(Russia) Anastasia Gubadova	000
(Germany) Iljana Marzok	002
(North Korea) Sol Kyong	003

Final
(France) Lucie Décosse	102
(North Korea) Sol Kyong	000

=== Pool B ===
First Round
(Japan) Yoriko Kunihara	101
(Italy) Erica Barbieri	000
(South Africa) Chantelle Doddemeade	000
(Thailand) Surattana Thongsri	101
(Hungary) Anett Meszaros	001
(Switzerland) Juliane Robra	000
(New Zealand) Moira de Villiers	000
(Luxembourg) Lynn Mossong	001

Quarterfinals
(Japan) Yoriko Kunihara	100
(Spain) Cecilia Blanco	000
(Thailand) Surattana Thongsri	000
(Tunisia) Houda Miled	002
(Hungary) Anett Meszaros	101
(El Salvador) Veronica Mendoza	000
(Luxembourg) Lynn Mossong	001
(Australia) Sara Collins	000

Semifinals
(Japan) Yoriko Kunihara	010
(Tunisia) Houda Miled	000
(Hungary) Anett Meszaros	101
(Luxembourg) Lynn Mossong	000

Final
(Japan) Yoriko Kunihara	001
(Hungary) Anett Meszaros	011

=== Pool C ===
First Round
(Netherlands) Edith Bosch	011
(Kazakhstan) Marian Urdabayeva	010
(Ukraine) Nataliya Smal	100
(Chad) Carine Ngarlemdana	000
(Slovenia) Raša Sraka	100
(Vietnam) Phuong Trang Tran Thi	000

Quarterfinals
(Netherlands) Edith Bosch	100
(China) Chen Fei	000
(Mauritius) Melissa St Pierre	000
(Ukraine) Nataliya Smal	100
(Slovenia) Raša Sraka	102
(United Kingdom) Sally Conway	000
(Brazil) Maria Portela	001
(Canada) Kelita Zupancic	000

Semifinals
(Netherlands) Edith Bosch	100
(Ukraine) Nataliya Smal	000
(Slovenia) Raša Sraka	001
(Brazil) Maria Portela	000

Final
(Netherlands) Edith Bosch	100
(Slovenia) Raša Sraka	000

=== Pool D ===
First Round
(South Korea) Hwang Ye-Sul	001
(Poland) Katarzyna Klys	000
(Lithuania) Raimonda Gedutyte	100
(Chinese Taipei) Huang Shih Han	000
(Japan) Haruka Tachimoto	100
(Latvia) Evija Pukite	000
(Cuba) Onix Cortés Aldama	100
(Croatia) Kristina Marijanovic	000

Quarterfinals
(South Korea) Hwang Ye-Sul	000
(Ecuador) Vanessa Chala	100
(France) Marie Pasquet	101
(Lithuania) Raimonda Gedutyte	000
(Japan) Haruka Tachimoto	100
(Spain) Maria Bernabeu	000
(Russia) Daria Davydova	000
(Cuba) Onix Cortés Aldama	012

Semifinals
(Ecuador) Vanessa Chala	000
(France) Marie Pasquet	100
(Japan) Haruka Tachimoto	000
(Cuba) Onix Cortés Aldama	002

Final
(France) Marie Pasquet	000
(Cuba) Onix Cortés Aldama	011

=== Repechage ===
Repechage		Third place
(North Korea) Sol Kyong	000
(Japan) Yoriko Kunihara	011	(Japan) Yoriko Kunihara	010
		(Cuba) Onix Cortés Aldama	000

Repechage		Third place
(Slovenia) Raša Sraka	001
(France) Marie Pasquet	000	(Slovenia) Raša Sraka	000
		(Hungary) Anett Meszaros	101

=== Finals ===
Semi-finals
(France) Lucie Décosse	100
(Hungary) Anett Meszaros	000
(Netherlands) Edith Bosch	001
(Cuba) Onix Cortés Aldama	000

Final
(France) Lucie Décosse	010
(Netherlands) Edith Bosch	000
