= 2009 European Judo Championships =

Judo 2009 European Judo Championships
- Venue: Tbilisi Sports Palace
- Location: (Georgia (country)) Tbilisi, Georgia
- Dates: 24–26 April 2009
- Competitors: 260 from 39 nations

Competition at external databases
- Links: IJF • JudoInside

The 2009 European Judo Championships were held at the Sports Palace, in Tbilisi, Georgia, from 24 to 26 April 2009.

== Medal overview ==
=== Men ===
Event	Gold	Silver	Bronze
−60 kg	(Russia) Arsen Galstyan	(Ukraine) Georgii Zantaraia	(Georgia (country)) Nestor Khergiani (Austria) Ludwig Paischer
−66 kg	(Hungary) Miklos Ungvári	(Poland) Tomasz Kowalski	(Russia) Alim Gadanov (Latvia) Deniss Kozlovs
−73 kg	(Ukraine) Volodymyr Soroka	(Netherlands) Dex Elmont	(France) Gilles Bonhomme (Moldova) Marcel Trudov
−81 kg	(Russia) Ivan Nifontov	(Italy) Antonio Ciano	(Slovenia) Aljaz Sedej (Georgia (country)) Levan Tsiklauri
−90 kg	(Belarus) Andrei Kazusenok	(Georgia (country)) Varlam Liparteliani	(Lithuania) Karolis Bauza (Azerbaijan) Elkhan Mammadov
−100 kg	(Russia) Tagir Khaibulaev	(Netherlands) Henk Grol	(Latvia) Jevgeņijs Borodavko (Romania) Daniel Brata
+100 kg	(Estonia) Martin Padar	(Netherlands) Grim Vuijsters	(Belarus) Ihar Makarau (Russia) Aleksandr Mikhailine

=== Women ===
Event	Gold	Silver	Bronze
−48 kg	(France) Frédérique Jossinet	(Hungary) Eva Csernoviczki	(Germany) Michaela Baschin (Romania) Alina Alexandra Dumitru
−52 kg	(Russia) Natalia Kuzyutina	(Spain) Ana Carrascosa	(Netherlands) Kitty Bravik (Belgium) Ilse Heylen
−57 kg	(Portugal) Telma Monteiro	(United Kingdom) Sarah Clark	(Hungary) Hedvig Karakas (France) Morgane Ribout
−63 kg	(Slovenia) Urška Žolnir	(Russia) Vera Koval	(Croatia) Marijana Mišković (Israel) Alice Schlesinger
−70 kg	(France) Lucie Décosse	(Germany) Kerstin Thiele	(Netherlands) Edith Bosch (Belgium) Catherine Jacques
−78 kg	(Spain) Esther San Miguel	(Ukraine) Maryna Pryshchepa	(Belarus) Sviatlana Tsimashenka (Germany) Heide Wollert
+78 kg	(Russia) Elena Ivashchenko	(Poland) Urszula Sadkowska	(Turkey) Gülşah Kocatürk (Germany) Franziska Konitz

=== Medal table ===
* Host nation (Georgia)

Rank	Nation	Gold	Silver	Bronze	Total
1	Russia	5	1	2	8
2	France	2	0	2	4
3	Ukraine	1	2	0	3
4	Hungary	1	1	1	3
5	Spain	1	1	0	2
6	Belarus	1	0	2	3
7	Slovenia	1	0	1	2
8	Estonia	1	0	0	1
8	Portugal	1	0	0	1
10	Netherlands	0	3	2	5
11	Poland	0	2	0	2
12	Germany	0	1	3	4
13	Georgia*	0	1	2	3
14	Great Britain	0	1	0	1
14	Italy	0	1	0	1
16	Belgium	0	0	2	2
16	Latvia	0	0	2	2
16	Romania	0	0	2	2
19	Austria	0	0	1	1
19	Azerbaijan	0	0	1	1
19	Croatia	0	0	1	1
19	Israel	0	0	1	1
19	Lithuania	0	0	1	1
19	Moldova	0	0	1	1
19	Turkey	0	0	1	1
Totals (25 entries)		14	14	28	56

== Results overview ==
=== Men ===
==== −60 kg ====
Position	Judoka	Country
1.	Arsen Galstyan	Russia
2.	Georgii Zantaraia	Ukraine
3.	Nestor Khergiani	Georgia
3.	Ludwig Paischer	Austria
5.	Ruben Houkes	Netherlands
5.	Elio Verde	Italy
7.	Damien Bomboir	Belgium
7.	James Millar	Great Britain

==== −66 kg ====
Position	Judoka	Country
1.	Miklos Ungvári	Hungary
2.	Tomasz Kowalski	Poland
3.	Alim Gadanov	Russia
3.	Deniss Kozlovs	Latvia
5.	Francesco Faraldo	Italy
5.	Armen Nazaryan	Armenia
7.	Sébastien Berthelot	France
7.	Adrian Kulisch	Germany

==== −73 kg ====
Position	Judoka	Country
1.	Volodymyr Soroka	Ukraine
2.	Dex Elmont	Netherlands
3.	Gilles Bonhomme	France
3.	Marcel Trudov	Moldova
5.	Mansur Isaev	Russia
5.	Attila Ungvári	Hungary
7.	Mario Schendel	Germany
7.	Krzysztof Wiłkomirski	Poland

==== −81 kg ====
Position	Judoka	Country
1.	Ivan Nifontov	Russia
2.	Antonio Ciano	Italy
3.	Aljaz Sedej	Slovenia
3.	Levan Tsiklauri	Georgia
5.	Ole Bischof	Germany
5.	Axel Clerget	France
7.	Mikalai Barkouski	Belarus
7.	Jorge Benavente	Spain

==== −90 kg ====
Position	Judoka	Country
1.	Andrei Kazusenok	Belarus
2.	Varlam Liparteliani	Georgia
3.	Karolis Bauza	Lithuania
3.	Elkhan Mammadov	Azerbaijan
5.	David Alarza	Spain
5.	Michael Pinske	Germany
7.	Ivan Pershin	Russia
7.	Vadym Synyavsky	Ukraine

==== −100 kg ====
Position	Judoka	Country
1.	Tagir Khaibulaev	Russia
2.	Henk Grol	Netherlands
3.	Jevgeņijs Borodavko	Latvia
3.	Daniel Brata	Romania
5.	Yauhen Biadulin	Belarus
5.	Ariel Ze'evi	Israel
7.	Dániel Hadfi	Hungary
7.	Dimitri Peters	Germany

==== +100 kg ====
Position	Judoka	Country
1.	Martin Padar	Estonia
2.	Grim Vuijsters	Netherlands
3.	Ihar Makarau	Belarus
3.	Aleksandr Mikhailine	Russia
5.	Andreas Tölzer	Germany
5.	Janusz Wojnarowicz	Poland
7.	Adam Okroashvili	Georgia
7.	Pierre Robin	France

=== Women ===
==== −48 kg ====
Position	Judoka	Country
1.	Frédérique Jossinet	France
2.	Éva Csernoviczki	Hungary
3.	Michaela Baschin	Germany
3.	Alina Alexandra Dumitru	Romania
5.	Oiana Blanco	Spain
5.	Volha Leshchanka	Belarus
7.	Liudmila Bogdanova	Russia
7.	Kubra Tekneci	Turkey

==== −52 kg ====
Position	Judoka	Country
1.	Natalia Kuzyutina	Russia
2.	Ana Carrascosa	Spain
3.	Kitty Bravik	Netherlands
3.	Ilse Heylen	Belgium
5.	Petra Nareks	Slovenia
5.	Jaana Sundberg	Finland
7.	Aynur Samat	Turkey
7.	Olha Sukha	Ukraine

==== −57 kg ====
Position	Judoka	Country
1.	Telma Monteiro	Portugal
2.	Sarah Clark	Great Britain
3.	Hedvig Karakas	Hungary
3.	Morgane Ribout	France
5.	Ioulietta Boukouvala	Greece
5.	Deborah Gravenstijn	Netherlands
7.	Sabrina Filzmoser	Austria
7.	Viola Waechter	Germany

==== −63 kg ====
Position	Judoka	Country
1.	Urška Žolnir	Slovenia
2.	Vera Koval	Russia
3.	Marijana Miskovic	Croatia
3.	Alice Schlesinger	Israel
5.	Irene Chevreuil	France
5.	Elisabeth Willeboordse	Netherlands
7.	Claudia Ahrens	Germany
7.	Anastasija Lieshkova	Belarus

==== −70 kg ====
Position	Judoka	Country
1.	Lucie Décosse	France
2.	Kerstin Thiele	Germany
3.	Edith Bosch	Netherlands
3.	Catherine Jacques	Belgium
5.	Cecilia Blanco	Spain
5.	Anett Meszaros	Hungary
7.	Erica Barbieri	Italy
7.	Nataliya Smal	Ukraine

==== −78 kg ====
Position	Judoka	Country
1.	Esther San Miguel	Spain
2.	Maryna Pryshchepa	Ukraine
3.	Sviatlana Tsimashenka	Belarus
3.	Heide Wollert	Germany
5.	Natalia Kazantseva	Russia
5.	Céline Lebrun	France
7.	Assunta Galeone	Italy
7.	Yahima Ramirez	Spain

==== +78 kg ====
Position	Judoka	Country
1.	Elena Ivashchenko	Russia
2.	Urszula Sadkowska	Poland
3.	Gülşah Kocatürk	Turkey
3.	Franziska Konitz	Germany
5.	Irine Leonidze	Georgia
5.	Lucija Polavder	Slovenia
7.	Maryna Prokofyeva	Ukraine
7.	Sarah Adlington	Great Britain
