= 2012 European Judo Championships =

2012 Judo European Judo Championships
- Venue: Traktor Ice Arena
- Location: Chelyabinsk, Russia
- Dates: 26–29 April 2012
- Competitors: 377 from 45 nations

Champions
- Men's team: Georgia (5th title)
- Women's team: Russia (3rd title)

Competition at external databases
- Links: IJF • EJU • JudoInside

The 2012 European Judo Championships were held at the Traktor Ice Arena in Chelyabinsk, Russia, from 26 to 29 April 2012.

== Medal overview ==
=== Men ===
| Event | Gold | Silver | Bronze |
|---|---|---|---|
| −60 kg | (Russia) Beslan Mudranov | (Armenia) Hovhannes Davtyan | (Georgia (country)) Amiran Papinashvili (Netherlands) Jeroen Mooren |
| −66 kg | (Russia) Alim Gadanov | (Poland) Tomasz Kowalski | (Slovenia) Rok Drakšič (Georgia (country)) Lasha Shavdatuashvili |
| −73 kg | (France) Ugo Legrand | (Ukraine) Volodymyr Soroka | (Netherlands) Dex Elmont (Israel) losef Palelashvili |
| −81 kg | (Russia) Sirazhudin Magomedov | (Russia) Murat Khabachirov | (Belgium) Joachim Bottieau (Latvia) Konstantīns Ovčiņņikovs |
| −90 kg | (Georgia (country)) Varlam Liparteliani | (Russia) Grigorii Sulemin | (Belarus) Andrei Kazusionak (Germany) Christophe Lambert |
| −100 kg | (Israel) Ariel Ze'evi | (Georgia (country)) Levan Zhorzholiani | (Azerbaijan) Elmar Gasimov (Russia) Zafar Makhmadov |
| +100 kg | (Russia) Aleksandr Mikhailine | (Hungary) Barna Bor | (Lithuania) Marius Paškevičius (Poland) Janusz Wojnarowicz |
| Teams | Georgia; Lasha Shavdatuashvili; Shalva Kardava; Zebeda Rekhviashvili; Nugzari Tatalashvili; Avtandili Tchrikishvili; Zurab Zviadauri; Varlam Liparteliani; Zviadi Khanjaliashvili; Adam Okruashvili | Russia; Musa Mogushkov; Murat Kodzokov; Batradz Kaytmazov; Murat Khabachirov; Arsen Pshmakhov; Kamil Magomedov; Kirill Voprosov; Alexander Mikhaylin | Ukraine; Hevorh Hevorhyan; Serhiy Drebot; Volodymyr Soroka; Dmytro Kanivets; Artem Vasylenko; Vadym Synyavsky; Roman Gontyuk; Stanislav Bondarenko; Artem Bloshenko Poland; Paweł Zagrodnik; Krzysztof Wiłkomirski; Łukasz Błach; Krzysztof Węglarz; Robert Krawczyk; Janusz Wojnarowicz |

=== Women ===
| Event | Gold | Silver | Bronze |
|---|---|---|---|
| −48 kg | (Romania) Alina Alexandra Dumitru | (Belgium) Charline Van Snick | (Hungary) Éva Csernoviczki (France) Laetitia Payet |
| −52 kg | (Romania) Andreea Chițu | (Russia) Natalia Kuziutina | (Germany) Romy Tarangul (Germany) Mareen Kräh |
| −57 kg | (Portugal) Telma Monteiro | (Greece) Ioulietta Boukouvala | (France) Automne Pavia (Germany) Miryam Roper |
| −63 kg | (France) Gévrise Émane | (Israel) Yarden Gerbi | (France) Clarisse Agbegnenou (Israel) Alice Schlesinger |
| −70 kg | (Netherlands) Edith Bosch | (Poland) Katarzyna Klys | (Slovenia) Raša Sraka (Switzerland) Juliane Robra |
| −78 kg | (Hungary) Abigél Joó | (France) Audrey Tcheuméo | (Ukraine) Maryna Pryshchepa (Slovenia) Ana Velensek |
| +78 kg | (Russia) Elena Ivashchenko | (Slovenia) Lucija Polavder | (United Kingdom) Karina Bryant (Turkey) Belkıs Zehra Kaya |
| Teams | Russia; Natalia Kuziutina; Irina Zabludina; Marta Labazina; Daria Davydova; Tea Donguzashvili; Elena Ivashchenko | France; Priscilla Gneto; Sarah Loko; Automne Pavia; Clarisse Agbegnenou; Marie Pasquet; Kayra Sayit; Anne-Sophie Mondière | Germany; Romy Tarangul; Mareen Kräh; Miryam Roper; Viola Wächter; Claudia Malzahn; Kerstin Teichert; Franziska Konitz; Luise Malzahn Turkey; Aynur Samat; Nazlıcan Özerler; Selda Karadağ; Büşra Katipoğlu; Gülşah Kocatürk; Belkıs Zehra Kaya |

=== Medal table ===
* Host nation (Russia)

| Rank | Nation | Gold | Silver | Bronze | Total |
|---|---|---|---|---|---|
| 1 | Russia (RUS)* | 6 | 4 | 1 | 11 |
| 2 | France (FRA) | 2 | 2 | 3 | 7 |
| 3 | Georgia (GEO) | 2 | 1 | 2 | 5 |
| 4 | Romania (ROU) | 2 | 0 | 0 | 2 |
| 5 | Israel (ISR) | 1 | 1 | 2 | 4 |
| 6 | Hungary (HUN) | 1 | 1 | 1 | 3 |
| 7 | Netherlands (NED) | 1 | 0 | 2 | 3 |
| 8 | Portugal (POR) | 1 | 0 | 0 | 1 |
| 9 | Poland (POL) | 0 | 2 | 2 | 4 |
| 10 | Slovenia (SLO) | 0 | 1 | 3 | 4 |
| 11 | Ukraine (UKR) | 0 | 1 | 2 | 3 |
| 12 | Belgium (BEL) | 0 | 1 | 1 | 2 |
| 13 | Armenia (ARM) | 0 | 1 | 0 | 1 |
| 13 | Greece (GRE) | 0 | 1 | 0 | 1 |
| 15 | Germany (GER) | 0 | 0 | 5 | 5 |
| 16 | Turkey (TUR) | 0 | 0 | 2 | 2 |
| 17 | Azerbaijan (AZE) | 0 | 0 | 1 | 1 |
| 17 | Belarus (BLR) | 0 | 0 | 1 | 1 |
| 17 | Great Britain (GBR) | 0 | 0 | 1 | 1 |
| 17 | Latvia (LAT) | 0 | 0 | 1 | 1 |
| 17 | Lithuania (LTU) | 0 | 0 | 1 | 1 |
| 17 | Switzerland (SUI) | 0 | 0 | 1 | 1 |
| Totals (22 entries) | | 16 | 16 | 32 | 64 |

== Results overview ==
=== Men ===
==== –60 kg ====
| Position | Team | Country |
|---|---|---|
| 1. | Beslan Mudranov | RUS |
| 2. | Hovhannes Davtyan | ARM |
| 3. | Amiran Papinashvili | GEO |
| 3. | Jeroen Mooren | NLD |
| 5. | Georgii Zantaraia | UKR |
| 5. | Ludwig Paischer | AUT |
| 7. | Betkil Shukvani | GEO |
| 7. | Elio Verde | ITA |

==== –66 kg ====
| Position | Team | Country |
|---|---|---|
| 1. | Alim Gadanov | RUS |
| 2. | Tomasz Kowalski | POL |
| 3. | Rok Drakšič | SVN |
| 3. | Lasha Shavdatuashvili | GEO |
| 5. | David Larose | FRA |
| 5. | Miklós Ungvári | HUN |
| 7. | Shalva Kardava | GEO |
| 7. | Sugoi Uriarte | ESP |

==== –73 kg ====
| Position | Team | Country |
|---|---|---|
| 1. | Ugo Legrand | FRA |
| 2. | Volodymyr Soroka | UKR |
| 3. | Dex Elmont | NLD |
| 3. | losef Palelashvili | ISR |
| 5. | Tomasz Adamiec | POL |
| 5. | Giovanni Di Cristo | ITA |
| 7. | Igor Wandtke | GER |
| 7. | Mansur Isaev | RUS |

==== –81 kg ====
| Position | Team | Country |
|---|---|---|
| 1. | Sirazhudin Magomedov | RUS |
| 2. | Murat Khabachirov | RUS |
| 3. | Joachim Bottieau | BEL |
| 3. | Konstantīns Ovčiņņikovs | LAT |
| 5. | Alexander Wieczerzak | GER |
| 5. | Avtandil Tchrikishvili | GEO |
| 7. | Robin Pacek | SWE |
| 7. | Axel Clerget | FRA |

==== –90 kg ====
| Position | Team | Country |
|---|---|---|
| 1. | Varlam Liparteliani | GEO |
| 2. | Grigorii Sulemin | RUS |
| 3. | Andrei Kazusionak | BLR |
| 3. | Christophe Lambert | GER |
| 5. | Romain Buffet | FRA |
| 5. | Aleksandar Kukolj | SRB |
| 7. | Dmitrij Gerasimenko | SRB |
| 7. | Timur Alikhanov | AZE |

==== –100 kg ====
| Position | Team | Country |
|---|---|---|
| 1. | Ariel Ze'evi | ISR |
| 2. | Levan Zhorzholiani | GEO |
| 3. | Zafar Makhmadov | RUS |
| 3. | Elmar Gasimov | AZE |
| 5. | Yauhen Biadulin | BLR |
| 5. | Dino Pfeiffer | GER |
| 7. | Sergei Samoilovich | RUS |
| 7. | Irakli Tsirekidze | GEO |

==== +100 kg ====
| Position | Team | Country |
|---|---|---|
| 1. | Aleksandr Mikhailine | RUS |
| 2. | Barna Bor | HUN |
| 3. | Janusz Wojnarowicz | POL |
| 3. | Marius Paškevičius | LTU |
| 5. | Adam Okroashvili | GEO |
| 5. | Matjaž Ceraj | SLO |
| 7. | Luuk Verbij | NED |
| 7. | Marko Radulović | MNE |

==== Teams ====
| Position | Team | Country |
|---|---|---|
| 1. | Georgia | GEO |
| 2. | Russia | RUS |
| 3. | Ukraine | UKR |
| 3. | Poland | POL |

=== Women ===
==== –48 kg ====
| Position | Team | Country |
|---|---|---|
| 1. | Alina Alexandra Dumitru | ROU |
| 2. | Charline Van Snick | BEL |
| 3. | Éva Csernoviczki | HUN |
| 3. | Laetitia Payet | FRA |
| 5. | Frédérique Jossinet | FRA |
| 5. | Nataliya Kondratyeva | RUS |
| 7. | Liudmila Bogdanova | RUS |
| 7. | Ana Hormigo | GER |

==== –52 kg ====
| Position | Team | Country |
|---|---|---|
| 1. | Andreea Chitu | ROU |
| 2. | Natalia Kuziutina | RUS |
| 3. | Romy Tarangul | DEU |
| 3. | Mareen Kräh | DEU |
| 5. | Laura Gómez | ESP |
| 5. | Ana Carrascosa | ESP |
| 7. | Joana Ramos | POR |
| 7. | Jaana Sundberg | FIN |

==== –57 kg ====
| Position | Team | Country |
|---|---|---|
| 1. | Telma Monteiro | POR |
| 2. | Ioulietta Boukouvala | GRE |
| 3. | Automne Pavia | FRA |
| 3. | Miryam Roper | DEU |
| 5. | Sarah Clark | GBR |
| 5. | Sarah Loko | FRA |
| 7. | Hedvig Karakas | HUN |
| 7. | Tuğba Zehir | TUR |

==== –63 kg ====
| Position | Team | Country |
|---|---|---|
| 1. | Gévrise Émane | FRA |
| 2. | Yarden Gerbi | ISR |
| 3. | Clarisse Agbegnenou | FRA |
| 3. | Alice Schlesinger | ISR |
| 5. | Ramila Yusubova | AZE |
| 5. | Urška Žolnir | SLO |
| 7. | Johanna Ylinen | FIN |
| 7. | Anicka van Emden | NED |

==== –70 kg ====
| Position | Team | Country |
|---|---|---|
| 1. | Edith Bosch | NED |
| 2. | Katarzyna Klys | POL |
| 3. | Raša Sraka | SLO |
| 3. | Juliane Robra | SUI |
| 5. | Erica Barbieri | ITA |
| 5. | Linda Bolder | NED |
| 7. | María Bernabéu Avomo | ESP |
| 7. | Sally Conway | GBR |

==== –78 kg ====
| Position | Team | Country |
|---|---|---|
| 1. | Abigél Joó | HUN |
| 2. | Audrey Tcheuméo | FRA |
| 3. | Anamari Velenšek | SLO |
| 3. | Maryna Pryshchepa | UKR |
| 5. | Luise Malzahn | GER |
| 5. | Marhinde Verkerk | NED |
| 7. | Yahima Ramirez | POR |
| 7. | Lucie Louette | FRA |

==== +78 kg ====
| Position | Team | Country |
|---|---|---|
| 1. | Elena Ivashchenko | RUS |
| 2. | Lucija Polavder | SLO |
| 3. | Karina Bryant | GBR |
| 3. | Belkız Zehra Kaya | TUR |
| 5. | Larisa Čerić | BIH |
| 5. | Carola Uilenhoed | NED |
| 7. | Anne-Sophie Mondière | FRA |
| 7. | Urszula Sadkowska | POL |

==== Teams ====
| Position | Team | Country |
|---|---|---|
| 1. | Russia | RUS |
| 2. | France | FRA |
| 3. | Germany | GER |
| 3. | Turkey | TUR |
