= Kerstin Thiele =

German judoka (born 1986)

Personal information
- Born: 26 August 1986 (age 39) Riesa, Bezirk Dresden, East Germany
- Occupation: Judoka
- Height: 168 cm (5 ft 6 in)

Sport
- Country: Germany
- Sport: Judo
- Weight class: ‍–‍70 kg, ‍–‍78 kg

Achievements and titles
- Olympic Games: (silver) (2012)
- World Champ.: R16 (2009)
- European Champ.: (silver) (2009)
Medal record
Women's judo
Representing Germany
Olympic Games
Silver medal – second place	2012 London	‍–‍70 kg
World Team Championships
Bronze medal – third place	2008 Tokyo	Women's team
European Championships
Silver medal – second place	2009 Tbilisi	‍–‍70 kg
Bronze medal – third place	2008 Lisbon	‍–‍70 kg
Bronze medal – third place	2012 Chelyabinsk	Women's team
IJF Grand Slam
Silver medal – second place	2009 Rio de Janeiro	‍–‍70 kg
Silver medal – second place	2011 Paris	‍–‍70 kg
Bronze medal – third place	2009 Paris	‍–‍70 kg
Bronze medal – third place	2009 Moscow	‍–‍70 kg
IJF Grand Prix
Bronze medal – third place	2014 Qingdao	‍–‍78 kg
Bronze medal – third place	2015 Tbilisi	‍–‍78 kg
European U23 Championships
Silver medal – second place	2007 Salzburg	‍–‍70 kg
European Junior Championships
Gold medal – first place	2005 Zagreb	‍–‍70 kg

Profile at external databases
- IJF: 665
- JudoInside.com: 23336
- Updated on 28 May 2023

Kerstin Thiele (born 26 August 1986, in Riesa, Bezirk Dresden, East Germany) is a German judoka and a silver medallist at the Olympic Games 2012 in London.

Kerstin Thiele is a German champion in judo in the Middleweight (‍–‍70 kg) division. She competes for the German club JC Leipzig, and was part of the German national team.

At the 2012 Olympics she reached the women's middleweight judo final vs. Lucie Décosse, who won the gold medal. On the way Thiele beat Moira de Villiers, Anett Meszaros, Edith Bosch and Chen Fei.
