= 2010 World Judo Championships – Men's 81 kg =

Judo competition

Judo Men's 81 kg at the 2010 World Judo Championships
- Venue: Yoyogi National Gymnasium
- Location: Tokyo, Japan
- Date: 10 September 2010
- Competitors: 79 from 55 nations

Medalists
gold medal	Kim Jae-Bum (1st title)	South Korea
silver medal	Leandro Guilheiro	Brazil
bronze medal	Masahiro Takamatsu	Japan
bronze medal	Euan Burton	Great Britain

Competition at external databases
- Links: IJF • JudoInside

The Men's -81 kg competition at the 2010 World Judo Championships was held at 10 September at the Yoyogi National Gymnasium in Tokyo, Japan. 79 competitors contested for the medals, being split in 4 Pools where the winner advanced to the medal round.

== Pool A ==
First Round
(Iran) Mohammad Jamali	000
(Argentina) Emmanuel Lucenti	100
(Belarus) Aliaksandr Stsiashenka	100
(Mongolia) Damdinsürengiin Nyamkhüü	000
(Germany) Ole Bischof	100
(Moldova) Valeriu Duminica	000
(Azerbaijan) Elkhan Rajabli	001
(Poland) Łukasz Błach	010

Second Round
(South Korea) Kim Jae-Bum	100
(Hungary) Laszlo Csoknyai	000
(Turkmenistan) Mulkaman Nurklychev	000
(Argentina) Emmanuel Lucenti	020
(Panama) Omar Pena	000
(Belarus) Aliaksandr Stsiashenka	100
(Slovenia) Aljaz Sedej	000
(Ukraine) Artem Vasylenko	100
(Germany) Ole Bischof	000
(Netherlands) Guillaume Elmont	100
(Croatia) Tomislav Marijanović	001
(Italy) Antonio Ciano	101
(Canada) Guillaume Perrault	001
(Egypt) Hatem Abd el Akher	010
(Portugal) Diogo Lima	011
(Poland) Łukasz Błach	000

Quarterfinals
(South Korea) Kim Jae-Bum	011
(Argentina) Emmanuel Lucenti	001
(Belarus) Aliaksandr Stsiashenka	001
(Ukraine) Artem Vasylenko	010
(Netherlands) Guillaume Elmont	011
(Italy) Antonio Ciano	001
(Egypt) Hatem Abd el Akher	100
(Portugal) Diogo Lima	001

Semifinals
(South Korea) Kim Jae-Bum	101
(Ukraine) Artem Vasylenko	000
(Netherlands) Guillaume Elmont	100
(Egypt) Hatem Abd el Akher	000

Final
(South Korea) Kim Jae-Bum	001
(Netherlands) Guillaume Elmont	000

== Pool B ==
First Round
(South Korea) Song Dae-Nam	020
(Kazakhstan) Islam Bozbayev	000
(Australia) Brent Iverson	111
(Philippines) John Baylon	000
(United Kingdom) Euan Burton	020
(Peru) German Velazco	000
(Georgia (country)) Levan Tsiklauri	000
(United States) Travis Stevens	100

Second Round
(South Korea) Song Dae-Nam	020
(Togo) Sacha Denanyoh	000
(Democratic Republic of the Congo) Lokuku Ngambomo	001
(France) Loic Pietri	111
(Japan) Masahiro Takamatsu	100
(Ghana) Victor Ahiavor	000
(Australia) Brent Iverson	000
(Belgium) Joachim Bottieau	020
(United Kingdom) Euan Burton	001
(Tajikistan) Farkhod Rakhimov	000
(Morocco) Safouane Attaf	010
(Uzbekistan) Shokir Muminov	000
(Switzerland) Micha Egger	000
(United States) Travis Stevens	100
(China) Si Rijigawa	101
(Chinese Taipei) Wu Chen-ying	000

Quarterfinals
(South Korea) Song Dae-Nam	001
(France) Loic Pietri	110
(Japan) Masahiro Takamatsu	100
(Belgium) Joachim Bottieau	000
(United Kingdom) Euan Burton	100
(Morocco) Safouane Attaf	0010
(United States) Travis Stevens	020
(China) Si Rijigawa	000

Semifinals
(France) Loic Pietri	000
(Japan) Masahiro Takamatsu	100
(United Kingdom) Euan Burton	001
(United States) Travis Stevens	000

Final
(Japan) Masahiro Takamatsu	100
(United Kingdom) Euan Burton	000

== Pool C ==
First Round
(Ukraine) Vitalii Dudchyk	011
(Montenegro) Srdjan Mrvaljevic	010
(Georgia (country)) George Shinjikashvili	001
(Azerbaijan) Elnur Mammadli	020
(France) Antoine Jeannin	111
(China) Li Maojian	001
(North Macedonia) Vanco Sarafov	000
(Canada) Kalem Kachur	110

Second Round
(Russia) Ivan Nifontov	100
(Iraq) Hussein Al-Aameri	000
(Ukraine) Vitalii Dudchyk	100
(Poland) Robert Krawczyk	000
(Switzerland) Christoph Keller	100
(Kyrgyzstan) Alimbek Dzuhsupov	001
(Azerbaijan) Elnur Mammadli	020
(Portugal) João Neto	001
(Brazil) Flávio Canto	101
(Thailand) Watcharin Jampawong	000
(France) Antoine Jeannin	100
(United Kingdom) Tom Redd	000
(Cuba) Osmay Cruz	000
(Canada) Kalem Kachur	100
(Fiji) Josateki Naulu	000
(Colombia) Pedro Castro	001

Quarterfinals
(Russia) Ivan Nifontov	100
(Ukraine) Vitalii Dudchyk	000
(Switzerland) Christoph Keller	000
(Azerbaijan) Elnur Mammadli	111
(Brazil) Flávio Canto	101
(France) Antoine Jeannin	000
(Canada) Kalem Kachur	101
(Colombia) Pedro Castro	000

Semifinals
(Russia) Ivan Nifontov	000
(Azerbaijan) Elnur Mammadli	021
(Brazil) Flávio Canto	111
(Canada) Kalem Kachur	000

Final
(Azerbaijan) Elnur Mammadli	000
(Brazil) Flávio Canto	101

== Pool D ==
First Round
(Brazil) Leandro Guilheiro	002
(Latvia) Konstantins Ovchinnikovs	000
(Mongolia) Uuganbaatar Otgonbaatar	001
(Italy) Francesco Bruyere	010
(Russia) Sirazhudin Magomedov	112
(United States) Jose Bencosme	000
(Iceland) Hermann Unnarsson	010
(Qatar) Waleed Hanfi	001

Second Round
(Brazil) Leandro Guilheiro	020
(Argentina) Alfredo Effron	000
(Finland) Antti Virta	000
(Japan) Takahiro Nakai	110
(Egypt) Mohamed Darwish	100
(Australia) Ben Zellner	001
(Italy) Francesco Bruyere	100
(Uzbekistan) Zafar Arslanov	000
(Russia) Sirazhudin Magomedov	010
(Moldova) Sergiu Toma	001
(Iceland) Hermann Unnarsson	000
(Turkey) Ahmet Sari	100
(Tajikistan) Sherali Bozorov	001
(Zambia) Boas Munyonga	021

Quarterfinals
(Brazil) Leandro Guilheiro	101
(Japan) Takahiro Nakai	000
(Egypt) Mohamed Darwish	000
(Italy) Francesco Bruyere	002
(Russia) Sirazhudin Magomedov	111
(Hungary) Sándor Nagysolymosi	001
(Turkey) Ahmet Sari	011
(Zambia) Boas Munyonga	000

Semifinals
(Brazil) Leandro Guilheiro	112
(Italy) Francesco Bruyere	000
(Russia) Sirazhudin Magomedov	001
(Turkey) Ahmet Sari	000

Final
(Brazil) Leandro Guilheiro	110
(Russia) Sirazhudin Magomedov	000

== Repechage ==
Repechage		Third place
(Netherlands) Guillaume Elmont	002
(United Kingdom) Euan Burton	101	(United Kingdom) Euan Burton	001
		(Brazil) Flávio Canto	000

Repechage		Third place
(Azerbaijan) Elnur Mammadli	011
(Russia) Sirazhudin Magomedov	001	(Azerbaijan) Elnur Mammadli	000
		(Japan) Masahiro Takamatsu	010

== Finals ==
Semi-finals
(South Korea) Kim Jae-Bum	002
(Japan) Masahiro Takamutsu	0000
(Brazil) Flávio Canto	000
(Brazil) Leandro Guilheiro	001

Final
(South Korea) Kim Jae-Bum	010
(Brazil) Leandro Guilheiro	000
