= Ghanaians in Japan =

Total population
- 3,541 (in December, 2025)

Languages
- Japanese, English, French, Akan, Dagbani, Ewe, Ga

Religion
- Mainly Christianity, Islam, Shintoism, Buddhism

Related ethnic groups
- Ghanaians

Ghanaians in Japan are Japanese people of full or partial Ghanaian ancestry or Ghanaians who became naturalized citizens of Japan.

== Overview ==
According to the foreign residents statistics of the Ministry of Justice, 2,005 Ghanaians are registered residents in Japan as of 2015. The number of Ghanaians arriving in Japan began to increase in the 1990s.

== Notable Ghanaians in Japan ==
- Evelyn Mawuli
- Stephanie Mawuli
- Abdul Hakim Sani Brown
- Karen Nun-Ira
- Michael Yano
- Jefferson Tabinas
- Paul Tabinas
- Zion Suzuki
