= Vitalii Dudchyk =

Ukrainian judoka (born 1984)

Personal information
- Born: 11 March 1984 (age 42) Dnipropetrovsk Oblast
- Occupation: Judoka

Sport
- Country: Ukraine
- Sport: Judo
- Weight class: –81 kg

Achievements and titles
- World Champ.: R32 (2010, 2011)
- European Champ.: 7th (2013, 2015)
Medal record
Men's judo
Representing Ukraine
European Games
| Bronze medal – third place | 2015 Baku | Men's team |
European Championships
| Bronze medal – third place | 2013 Budapest | Men's team |
IJF Grand Slam
| Silver medal – second place | 2013 Moscow | –81 kg |
IJF Grand Prix
| Silver medal – second place | 2013 Samsun | –81 kg |
| Bronze medal – third place | 2010 Abu Dhabi | –81 kg |

Profile at external databases
- IJF: 2771
- JudoInside.com: 39160
- Updated on 27 November 2022

Vitalii Dudchyk (born 11 March 1984 in Dnipropetrovsk Oblast) is a former male Ukrainian judoka. He is a bronze medalist of the 2015 European Games in the team event and a bronze medalist of the 2013 European Championships in the team event as well. In the individual competition at the 2015 European Games, Dudchyk defeated Szabolcs Krizsán from Hungary, Adrián Nacimiento from Spain, but lost to the eventual silver medallist Ivan Nifontov from Russia. Dudchyk lost in the first repechage round to the eventual bronze medallist Loïc Pietri from France, thus placing 7th at the Games.

Dudchyk competed at three World Championships. In 2010 in Tokyo, he defeated Srđan Mrvaljević from Montenegro and Robert Krawczyk from Poland, but lost to Ivan Nifontov from Russia in the round of 32. In 2011 in Paris, he defeated Abderahmane Benamadi from Algeria, but lost to Flávio Canto from Brazil in the round of 32. In 2013 in Rio de Janeiro, he lost to Robin Pacek from Sweden in the round of 128.

Dudchyk had several successes in some international competitions. He was second at the 2013 Judo Grand Prix Samsun, second at the 2013 Judo Grand Slam Moscow and third at the 2010 Judo Grand Prix Abu Dhabi.

== Personal life ==
Dudchyk graduated from the National Academy for Public Administration. Dudchyk's wife is Ukraine judoka Nataliya Malikova who is a bronze medallist of both the 2003 European Cadet Championships and 2005 European Junior Championships. They have a daughter.
