= Judo at the 2012 Summer Olympics – Women's 70 kg =

Women's 70kg at the Games of the XXX Olympiad
- Venue: ExCeL Exhibition Centre
- Date: 1 August 2012
- Competitors: 22 from 22 nations

Medalists
1st place, gold medalist(s)		Lucie Décosse	France
2nd place, silver medalist(s)		Kerstin Thiele	Germany
3rd place, bronze medalist(s)		Yuri Alvear	Colombia
3rd place, bronze medalist(s)		Edith Bosch	Netherlands

Women's 70 kg competition in judo at the 2012 Summer Olympics in London, United Kingdom, took place at ExCeL London.

The gold and silver medals were determined by a single-elimination tournament, with the winner of the final taking gold and the loser receiving silver. Judo events awarded two bronze medals. Quarterfinal losers competed in a repechage match for the right to face a semifinal loser for a bronze medal (that is, the judokas defeated in quarterfinals A and B competed against each other, with the winner of that match facing the semifinal loser from the other half of the bracket).

== Schedule ==
All times are British Summer Time (UTC+1)

Date	Time	Round
Wednesday, 1 August 2012	09:30; 14:00; 16:10	Qualifications; Semifinals; Final

== Results ==
=== Finals ===
Semi-finals
Lucie Décosse (FRA)	0001
Hwang Ye-Sul (KOR)	0000
Kerstin Thiele (GER)	0001
Chen Fei (CHN)	0000

Final
Lucie Décosse (FRA)	0120
Kerstin Thiele (GER)	0000

=== Repechages ===
Repechage		Bronze medal
Yuri Alvear (COL)	1000
Raša Sraka (SLO)	0001	Yuri Alvear (COL)	0011
		Chen Fei (CHN)	0001

Repechage		Bronze medal
Edith Bosch (NED)	0011
Haruka Tachimoto (JPN)	0002	Edith Bosch (NED)	0011
		Hwang Ye-Sul (KOR)	0011

=== Pool A ===
First Round		Second Round		Quarterfinals
		L Décosse (FRA)	1001
		K Zupancic (CAN)	0001
				L Décosse (FRA)	1000
M Portela (BRA)	0000			Y Alvear (COL)	0000
Y Alvear (COL)	1100	Y Alvear (COL)	0100
		A Moreira (ANG)	0001

=== Pool B ===
First Round		Second Round		Quarterfinals
		R Sraka (SLO)	1102
N Smal (UKR)	0002	C Blanco (ESP)	0001
C Blanco (ESP)	0110			R Sraka (SLO)	0001
Y-S Hwang (KOR)	0102			Y-S Hwang (KOR)	1000
E Barbieri (ITA)	0001	Y-S Hwang (KOR)	0011
		J Robra (SUI)	0002

=== Pool C ===
First Round
S Conway (GBR)	1110
C Ngarlemdana (CHA)	0002
K Thiele (GER)	0010
M de Villiers (NZL)	0002

Second Round
E Bosch (NED)	0010
S Conway (GBR)	0001
A Mészáros (HUN)	0001
K Thiele (GER)	0001

Quarterfinals
E Bosch (NED)	0000
K Thiele (GER)	0101

=== Pool D ===
First Round		Second Round		Quarterfinals
		H Tachimoto (JPN)	0000
		O Cortés (CUB)	0001
				H Tachimoto (JPN)	0020
F Chen (CHN)	1001			F Chen (CHN)	0020
K Kłys (POL)	0000	F Chen (CHN)	1000
		H Miled (TUN)	0001
