= Tachimoto =

Tachimoto (written: 田知本) is a Japanese surname. Notable people with the surname include:

- Haruka Tachimoto (田知本 遥, born 1990), Japanese judoka
- Megumi Tachimoto (田知本 愛, born 1989), Japanese judoka
