= Zintiridis =

Zintiridis is a surname. Notable people with the surname include:

- Revazi Zintiridis (born 1985), Greek judoka
- Tariel Zintiridis (born 1987), Greek judoka
