= 2014 World Judo Championships – Women's 70 kg =

Judo competition

Judo Women's 70 kg at the 2014 World Judo Championships
- Venue: Traktor Ice Arena
- Location: Chelyabinsk, Russia
- Date: 29 August 2014
- Competitors: 33 from 29 nations
- Total prize money: 14,000$

Medalists
gold medal	Yuri Alvear (3rd title)	Colombia
silver medal	Karen Nun Ira	Japan
bronze medal	Onix Cortés	Cuba
bronze medal	Katarzyna Kłys	Poland

Competition at external databases
- Links: IJF • JudoInside

The women's 70 kg competition of the 2014 World Judo Championships was held on 29 August.

== Medalists ==
Gold	Silver	Bronze
Yuri Alvear (COL)	Karen Nun Ira (JPN)	Onix Cortés (CUB); Katarzyna Kłys (POL)

== Results ==
=== Finals ===
Semi-finals
(Netherlands) Kim Polling	000
(Colombia) Yuri Alvear	111
(Croatia) Barbara Matić	000
(Japan) Karen Nun Ira	101

Final
(Colombia) Yuri Alvear	100
(Japan) Karen Nun Ira	000

=== Repechage ===
Repechage		Third place
(Uzbekistan) Gulnoza Matniyazova	000
(Cuba) Onix Cortés	100	(Cuba) Onix Cortés	100
		(Croatia) Barbara Matić	000

Repechage		Third place
(Poland) Katarzyna Kłys	010
(Canada) Kelita Zupancic	000	(Poland) Katarzyna Kłys	010
		(Netherlands) Kim Polling	001

=== Pool A ===
Quarterfinals		Semifinals		Final
(Netherlands) Kim Polling	000
(Mongolia) Naranjargal Tsend-Ayush	000	(Netherlands) Kim Polling	100
(China) Liu Hongyan	000	(Tunisia) Houda Miled	000
(Tunisia) Houda Miled	100			(Netherlands) Kim Polling	000
(Germany) Iljana Marzok	002			(Uzbekistan) Gulnoza Matniyazova	000
(Uzbekistan) Gulnoza Matniyazova	100	(Uzbekistan) Gulnoza Matniyazova	100
(Canada) Monika Burgess	000	(Bosnia and Herzegovina) Aleksandra Samardžić	000
(Bosnia and Herzegovina) Aleksandra Samardžić	002

=== Pool B ===
Quarterfinals		Semifinals		Final
(Colombia) Yuri Alvear	001
(Luxembourg) Lynn Mossong	000	(Colombia) Yuri Alvear	010
(Brazil) Bárbara Timo	100	(Brazil) Bárbara Timo	001
(South Korea) Jeong Hye-jin	000			(Colombia) Yuri Alvear	100
(United Kingdom) Sally Conway	000			(Cuba) Onix Cortés	000
(Italy) Jennifer Pitzanti	100	(Italy) Jennifer Pitzanti	000
(Russia) Ekaterina Denisenkova	000	(Cuba) Onix Cortés	010
(Cuba) Onix Cortés	000

=== Pool C ===
First Round
(France) Fanny Posvite	000
(Italy) Giulia Cantoni	000

Quarterfinals
(Germany) Laura Vargas Koch	000
(France) Fanny Posvite	000
(Spain) María Bernabéu	000
(Poland) Katarzyna Kłys	001
(Austria) Bernadette Graf	010
(Georgia (country)) Esther Stam	000
(Ecuador) Vanessa Chala	000
(Croatia) Barbara Matić	010

Semifinals
(Germany) Laura Vargas Koch	000
(Poland) Katarzyna Kłys	000
(Austria) Bernadette Graf	000
(Croatia) Barbara Matić	000

Final
(Poland) Katarzyna Kłys	000
(Croatia) Barbara Matić	010

=== Pool D ===
Quarterfinals		Semifinals		Final
(Canada) Kelita Zupancic	100
(Switzerland) Juliane Robra	000	(Canada) Kelita Zupancic	010
(Turkmenistan) Nursoltan Ashyrova	000	(Angola) Antónia Moreira	000
(Angola) Antónia Moreira	100			(Canada) Kelita Zupancic	000
(Morocco) Assmaa Niang	010			(Japan) Karen Nun Ira	010
(Japan) Karen Nun Ira	101	(Japan) Karen Nun Ira	110
(China) Zhou Chao	101	(China) Zhou Chao	010
(Kazakhstan) Dilbar Umiraliyeva	000

== Prize money ==
The sums listed bring the total prizes awarded to $14,000 for the individual event.

Medal	Total	Judoka	Coach
Gold	$6,000	$4,800	$1,200
Silver	$4,000	$3,200	$800
Bronze	$2,000	$1,600	$400
