= 2012 Judo Grand Slam Paris =

Judo competition

Judo 2012 Judo Grand Slam Paris
- Venue: Accor Arena
- Location: Paris, France
- Dates: 4–5 February 2012
- Competitors: 584 from 94 nations

Competition at external databases
- Links: IJF • EJU • JudoInside

The 2012 Judo Grand Slam Paris was held in Paris, France, from 4 to 5 February 2012.

== Medal summary ==
=== Men's events ===
Event	Gold	Silver	Bronze
Extra-lightweight (−60 kg)	Rishod Sobirov (UZB)	Kim Won-jin (KOR)	Jin-Min Jang (KOR)
Extra-lightweight (−60 kg)	Rishod Sobirov (UZB)	Kim Won-jin (KOR)	Amiran Papinashvili (GEO)
Half-lightweight (−66 kg)	David Larose (FRA)	Cho Jun-ho (KOR)	Khashbaataryn Tsagaanbaatar (MGL)
Half-lightweight (−66 kg)	David Larose (FRA)	Cho Jun-ho (KOR)	Sergey Lim (KAZ)
Lightweight (−73 kg)	Sainjargalyn Nyam-Ochir (MGL)	Christopher Völk (GER)	Gilles Bonhomme (FRA)
Lightweight (−73 kg)	Sainjargalyn Nyam-Ochir (MGL)	Christopher Völk (GER)	Zelimkhan Ozdoev (RUS)
Half-middleweight (−81 kg)	Ole Bischof (GER)	Antonio Ciano (ITA)	Keita Nagashima (JPN)
Half-middleweight (−81 kg)	Ole Bischof (GER)	Antonio Ciano (ITA)	Sergiu Toma (MDA)
Middleweight (−90 kg)	Dilshod Choriev (UZB)	Roman Hontyuk (UKR)	Kirill Denisov (RUS)
Middleweight (−90 kg)	Dilshod Choriev (UZB)	Roman Hontyuk (UKR)	Asley González (CUB)
Half-heavyweight (−100 kg)	Naidangiin Tüvshinbayar (MGL)	Jevgeņijs Borodavko (LAT)	Battulgyn Temüülen (MGL)
Half-heavyweight (−100 kg)	Naidangiin Tüvshinbayar (MGL)	Jevgeņijs Borodavko (LAT)	Ramziddin Sayidov (UZB)
Heavyweight (+100 kg)	Teddy Riner (FRA)	Rafael Silva (BRA)	Kim Sung-min (KOR)
Heavyweight (+100 kg)	Teddy Riner (FRA)	Rafael Silva (BRA)	Abdullo Tangriev (UZB)

=== Women's events ===
Event	Gold	Silver	Bronze
Extra-lightweight (−48 kg)	Tomoko Fukumi (JPN)	Sarah Menezes (BRA)	Alina Dumitru (ROU)
Extra-lightweight (−48 kg)	Tomoko Fukumi (JPN)	Sarah Menezes (BRA)	Mönkhbatyn Urantsetseg (MGL)
Half-lightweight (−52 kg)	Yuka Nishida (JPN)	Mönkhbaataryn Bundmaa (MGL)	Yanet Bermoy (CUB)
Half-lightweight (−52 kg)	Yuka Nishida (JPN)	Mönkhbaataryn Bundmaa (MGL)	Ana Carrascosa (ESP)
Lightweight (−57 kg)	Telma Monteiro (POR)	Aiko Sato (JPN)	Marti Malloy (USA)
Lightweight (−57 kg)	Telma Monteiro (POR)	Aiko Sato (JPN)	Automne Pavia (FRA)
Half-middleweight (−63 kg)	Miki Tanaka (JPN)	Joung Da-woon (KOR)	Alice Schlesinger (ISR)
Half-middleweight (−63 kg)	Miki Tanaka (JPN)	Joung Da-woon (KOR)	Elisabeth Willeboordse (NED)
Middleweight (−70 kg)	Haruka Tachimoto (JPN)	Lucie Décosse (FRA)	Hwang Ye-sul (KOR)
Middleweight (−70 kg)	Haruka Tachimoto (JPN)	Lucie Décosse (FRA)	Yoriko Kunihara (JPN)
Half-heavyweight (−78 kg)	Mayra Aguiar (BRA)	Kayla Harrison (USA)	Akari Ogata (JPN)
Half-heavyweight (−78 kg)	Mayra Aguiar (BRA)	Kayla Harrison (USA)	Audrey Tcheuméo (FRA)
Heavyweight (+78 kg)	Megumi Tachimoto (JPN)	Elena Ivashchenko (RUS)	Anne-Sophie Mondière (FRA)
Heavyweight (+78 kg)	Megumi Tachimoto (JPN)	Elena Ivashchenko (RUS)	Idalys Ortiz (CUB)

Source Results

=== Medal table ===
* Host nation (France)

Rank	Nation	Gold	Silver	Bronze	Total
1	Japan (JPN)	5	1	3	9
2	France (FRA)*	2	1	4	7
3	Mongolia (MGL)	2	1	3	6
4	Uzbekistan (UZB)	2	0	2	4
5	Brazil (BRA)	1	2	0	3
6	Germany (GER)	1	1	0	2
7	Portugal (POR)	1	0	0	1
8	South Korea (KOR)	0	3	3	6
9	Russia (RUS)	0	1	2	3
10	United States (USA)	0	1	1	2
11	Italy (ITA)	0	1	0	1
11	Latvia (LAT)	0	1	0	1
11	Ukraine (UKR)	0	1	0	1
14	Cuba (CUB)	0	0	3	3
15	Georgia (GEO)	0	0	1	1
15	Israel (ISR)	0	0	1	1
15	Kazakhstan (KAZ)	0	0	1	1
15	Moldova (MDA)	0	0	1	1
15	Netherlands (NED)	0	0	1	1
15	Romania (ROU)	0	0	1	1
15	Spain (ESP)	0	0	1	1
Totals (21 entries)		14	14	28	56
