= 2005 European U23 Judo Championships =

Judo competition

Judo 2005 European U23 Judo Championships
- Location: Kyiv, Ukraine
- Dates: 19–20 November 2005

Competition at external databases
- Links: JudoInside

The 2005 European U23 Judo Championships is an edition of the European U23 Judo Championships, organised by the International Judo Federation. It was held in Kyiv, Ukraine from 19 to 20 November 2005.

== Medal summary ==
=== Medal table ===
* Host nation (Ukraine)

| Rank | Nation | Gold | Silver | Bronze | Total |
|---|---|---|---|---|---|
| 1 | Germany (GER) | 4 | 1 | 0 | 5 |
| 2 | France (FRA) | 2 | 0 | 1 | 3 |
| 3 | Russia (RUS) | 1 | 3 | 3 | 7 |
| 4 | Poland (POL) | 1 | 1 | 1 | 3 |
| 5 | Italy (ITA) | 1 | 1 | 0 | 2 |
| 6 | Netherlands (NED) | 1 | 0 | 5 | 6 |
| 7 | Georgia (GEO) | 1 | 0 | 3 | 4 |
| 8 | Belarus (BLR) | 1 | 0 | 2 | 3 |
| 8 | Greece (GRE) | 1 | 0 | 2 | 3 |
| 10 | Moldova (MDA) | 1 | 0 | 0 | 1 |
| 11 | Ukraine (UKR)* | 0 | 4 | 0 | 4 |
| 12 | Portugal (POR) | 0 | 1 | 0 | 1 |
| 12 | Romania (ROU) | 0 | 1 | 0 | 1 |
| 12 | Slovenia (SLO) | 0 | 1 | 0 | 1 |
| 12 | Switzerland (SUI) | 0 | 1 | 0 | 1 |
| 16 | Hungary (HUN) | 0 | 0 | 4 | 4 |
| 17 | Turkey (TUR) | 0 | 0 | 2 | 2 |
| 18 | Austria (AUT) | 0 | 0 | 1 | 1 |
| 18 | Azerbaijan (AZE) | 0 | 0 | 1 | 1 |
| 18 | Belgium (BEL) | 0 | 0 | 1 | 1 |
| 18 | Czech Republic (CZE) | 0 | 0 | 1 | 1 |
| 18 | Finland (FIN) | 0 | 0 | 1 | 1 |
| Totals (22 entries) | | 14 | 14 | 28 | 56 |

=== Men's events ===
| Event | Gold | Silver | Bronze |
|---|---|---|---|
| Extra-lightweight (−60 kg) | Jeroen Mooren (NED) | Maksym Korotun (UKR) | Tariel Zintiridis (GRE) |
| Extra-lightweight (−60 kg) | Jeroen Mooren (NED) | Maksym Korotun (UKR) | Kamil Sulek (POL) |
| Half-lightweight (−66 kg) | Marcel Trudov (MDA) | Alim Gadanov (RUS) | Revazi Zintiridis (GRE) |
| Half-lightweight (−66 kg) | Marcel Trudov (MDA) | Alim Gadanov (RUS) | Zaza Kedelashvili (GEO) |
| Lightweight (−73 kg) | Marco Maddaloni (ITA) | Sašo Jereb (SLO) | Maksim Satsuk (BLR) |
| Lightweight (−73 kg) | Marco Maddaloni (ITA) | Sašo Jereb (SLO) | Malkhaz Osadze (RUS) |
| Half-middleweight (−81 kg) | Dennis Huck (GER) | Lukasz Balanda (POL) | Alain Schmitt (FRA) |
| Half-middleweight (−81 kg) | Dennis Huck (GER) | Lukasz Balanda (POL) | Saba Gavashelishvili (GEO) |
| Middleweight (−90 kg) | Andrei Kazusenok (BLR) | Michael Pinske (GER) | Levan Zhorzholiani (GEO) |
| Middleweight (−90 kg) | Andrei Kazusenok (BLR) | Michael Pinske (GER) | Burhan Kocan (TUR) |
| Half-heavyweight (−100 kg) | Dimitri Peters (GER) | Vitaliy Bubon (UKR) | Benjamin van Leeuwaarde (NED) |
| Half-heavyweight (−100 kg) | Dimitri Peters (GER) | Vitaliy Bubon (UKR) | Aleksey Ledenev (RUS) |
| Heavyweight (+100 kg) | Lasha Gujejiani (GEO) | Alessandro Frezza (ITA) | Yauheni Kavalevski (BLR) |
| Heavyweight (+100 kg) | Lasha Gujejiani (GEO) | Alessandro Frezza (ITA) | Nikolay Barabanov (RUS) |

=== Women's events ===
| Event | Gold | Silver | Bronze |
|---|---|---|---|
| Extra-lightweight (−48 kg) | Laëtitia Payet (FRA) | Carmen Bogdan (ROU) | Ilona Perge (HUN) |
| Extra-lightweight (−48 kg) | Laëtitia Payet (FRA) | Carmen Bogdan (ROU) | Leen Dom (BEL) |
| Half-lightweight (−52 kg) | Lyudmila Bogdanova (RUS) | Telma Monteiro (POR) | Jaana Sundberg (FIN) |
| Half-lightweight (−52 kg) | Lyudmila Bogdanova (RUS) | Telma Monteiro (POR) | Natascha van Gurp (NED) |
| Lightweight (−57 kg) | Marlen Hein (GER) | Arina Pchelintseva (RUS) | Bernadett Baczkó (HUN) |
| Lightweight (−57 kg) | Marlen Hein (GER) | Arina Pchelintseva (RUS) | Kifayat Gasimova (AZE) |
| Half-middleweight (−63 kg) | Ioulietta Boukouvala (GRE) | Juliane Robra (SUI) | Margot Wetzer (NED) |
| Half-middleweight (−63 kg) | Ioulietta Boukouvala (GRE) | Juliane Robra (SUI) | Brigitta Szabó (HUN) |
| Middleweight (−70 kg) | Elisabeth Greve (GER) | Maryna Pryshchepa (UKR) | Aranka Schauer (AUT) |
| Middleweight (−70 kg) | Elisabeth Greve (GER) | Maryna Pryshchepa (UKR) | Anett Mészáros (HUN) |
| Half-heavyweight (−78 kg) | Lucie Louette (FRA) | Nataliya Smal (UKR) | Marhinde Verkerk (NED) |
| Half-heavyweight (−78 kg) | Lucie Louette (FRA) | Nataliya Smal (UKR) | Alena Eiglova (CZE) |
| Heavyweight (+78 kg) | Urszula Sadkowska (POL) | Elena Ivashchenko (RUS) | Carola Uilenhoed (NED) |
| Heavyweight (+78 kg) | Urszula Sadkowska (POL) | Elena Ivashchenko (RUS) | Gülşah Kocatürk (TUR) |

Source Results
