= Yoriko Kunihara =

Japanese judoka (born 1985)

Personal information
- Born: 20 November 1985 (age 40)
- Occupation: Judoka

Sport
- Country: Japan
- Sport: Judo
- Weight class: ‍–‍70 kg

Achievements and titles
- World Champ.: (bronze) (2010, 2011)
Medal record
Women's judo
Representing Japan
World Championships
Bronze medal – third place	2010 Tokyo	‍–‍70 kg
Bronze medal – third place	2011 Paris	‍–‍70 kg
World Masters
Silver medal – second place	2010 Suwon	‍–‍70 kg
Silver medal – second place	2012 Almaty	‍–‍70 kg
Bronze medal – third place	2011 Baku	‍–‍70 kg
IJF Grand Slam
Gold medal – first place	2009 Moscow	‍–‍70 kg
Gold medal – first place	2011 Rio de Janeiro	‍–‍70 kg
Bronze medal – third place	2009 Tokyo	‍–‍70 kg
Bronze medal – third place	2010 Paris	‍–‍70 kg
Bronze medal – third place	2010 Rio de Janeiro	‍–‍70 kg
Bronze medal – third place	2011 Paris	‍–‍70 kg
Bronze medal – third place	2012 Paris	‍–‍70 kg
IJF Grand Prix
Silver medal – second place	2010 Düsseldorf	‍–‍70 kg
Bronze medal – third place	2012 Düsseldorf	‍–‍70 kg
Summer Universiade
Gold medal – first place	2007 Bangkok	‍–‍70 kg
Gold medal – first place	2009 Belgrade	‍–‍70 kg

Profile at external databases
- IJF: 2016
- JudoInside.com: 35492
- Updated on 17 July 2023

Yoriko Kunihara (國原 頼子, Kunihara Yoriko; born 20 November 1985 in Niigata, Niigata) is a Japanese judoka. She won bronze medals in the middleweight division (70 kg) at the 2010 and 2011 World Judo Championships.
