= Marcel Trudov =

Moldovan judoka

Personal information
- Born: 31 August 1984 (age 42)
- Occupation: Judoka

Sport
- Country: Moldova
- Sport: Judo
- Weight class: –73 kg

Achievements and titles
- World Champ.: R16 (2007, 2009)
- European Champ.: (bronze) (2009)
Medal record
Men's judo
Representing Moldova
European Championships
Bronze medal – third place	2009 Tbilisi	–73 kg
European U23 Championships
Gold medal – first place	2005 Kyiv	–66 kg

Profile at external databases
- IJF: 34121
- JudoInside.com: 25516
- Updated on 15 November 2022

Marcel Trudov (born 31 August 1984) is a Moldovan judoka.

== Achievements ==
Year	Tournament	Place	Weight class
2009	European Judo Championships	3rd	Lightweight (73 kg)
2006	European Judo Championships	7th	Half lightweight (66 kg)
2005	European Judo Championships	5th	Half lightweight (66 kg)
