= Vera Koval =

Russian judoka (born 1983)

Personal information
- Full name: Vera Vyacheslavovna Koval
- Born: 22 October 1983 (age 42) Bryansk, Russian SFSR
- Occupation: Judoka
- Height: 1.67 m (5 ft 6 in)

Sport
- Country: Russia
- Sport: Judo, Sumo
- Weight class: ‍–‍63 kg

Achievements and titles
- Olympic Games: R32 (2008)
- World Champ.: 5th (2009)
- European Champ.: (silver) (2009)
Medal record
Women's judo
Representing Russia
European Championships
Silver medal – second place	2009 Tbilisi	‍–‍63 kg
Bronze medal – third place	2010 Vienna	‍–‍63 kg
IJF Grand Slam
Bronze medal – third place	2009 Paris	‍–‍63 kg
Women's sumo
World Games
Bronze medal – third place	2013 Cali	Lightweight

Profile at external databases
- IJF: 368
- JudoInside.com: 36072
- Updated on 15 November 2022

Vera Vyacheslavovna Koval (Russian: Вера Вячеславовна Коваль; born 22 October 1983 in Bryansk) is a Russian judoka, who competed in the half-middleweight category. She won two medals (silver and bronze) for her division at the 2009 European Judo Championships in Tbilisi, Georgia, and at the 2010 European Judo Championships in Vienna, Austria. She also competes in women's sumo, including at the World Championships.

== Career ==
Koval represented Russia at the 2008 Summer Olympics in Beijing, where she competed for the women's half-middleweight class (63 kg). Unfortunately, she lost the first preliminary match to Netherlands' Elisabeth Willeboordse, who successfully scored a yuko and a morote gari (two hand reap) at the end of the five-minute period.
