= Murat Khabachirov =

Russian judoka (born 1988)

Personal information
- Born: 14 May 1988 (age 38)
- Occupation: Judoka

Sport
- Country: Russia
- Sport: Judo
- Weight class: ‍–‍81 kg

Achievements and titles
- European Champ.: (silver) (2012)
Medal record
Men's judo
Representing Russia
European Championships
Silver medal – second place	2012 Chelyabinsk	‍–‍81 kg
IJF Grand Slam
Gold medal – first place	2012 Moscow	‍–‍81 kg
IJF Grand Prix
Silver medal – second place	2011 Düsseldorf	‍–‍81 kg
Silver medal – second place	2012 Qingdao	‍–‍81 kg
Bronze medal – third place	2014 Havana	‍–‍81 kg
Bronze medal – third place	2014 Zagreb	‍–‍81 kg
Bronze medal – third place	2017 Antalya	‍–‍81 kg
European U23 Championships
Gold medal – first place	2010 Sarajevo	‍–‍81 kg
Summer Universiade
Bronze medal – third place	2011 Shenzhen	‍–‍81 kg

Profile at external databases
- IJF: 2587
- JudoInside.com: 52942
- Updated on 14 November 2022

Murat Khabachirov (born 14 May 1988) is a Russian judoka.

Khabachirov is a bronze medalist from the 2017 Judo Grand Prix Antalya in the ‍–‍81 kg category.
