= Kelita Zupancic =

Canadian judoka (born 1990)

Personal information
- Born: May 9, 1990 (age 36) Whitby, Ontario
- Occupation: Judoka
- Height: 1.70 m (5 ft 7 in)

Sport
- Country: Canada
- Sport: Judo
- Weight class: –70 kg
- Coached by: Nicolas Gill

Achievements and titles
- Olympic Games: 7th (2016)
- World Champ.: 7th (2014, 2018)
- Pan American Champ.: (2010, 2013, 2015)
Medal record
Women's judo
Representing Canada
Pan American Games
Gold medal – first place	2015 Toronto	‍–‍70 kg
Pan American Championships
Gold medal – first place	2010 San Salvador	‍–‍70 kg
Gold medal – first place	2013 San José	‍–‍70 kg
Gold medal – first place	2015 Edmonton	‍–‍70 kg
Silver medal – second place	2014 Guayaquil	‍–‍70 kg
Silver medal – second place	2016 Havana	‍–‍70 kg
Silver medal – second place	2017 Panama City	‍–‍70 kg
Bronze medal – third place	2009 Buenos Aires	‍–‍70 kg
Bronze medal – third place	2011 Guadalajara	‍–‍70 kg
Bronze medal – third place	2012 Montreal	‍–‍70 kg
Bronze medal – third place	2018 San José	‍–‍70 kg
Bronze medal – third place	2019 Lima	‍–‍70 kg
World Masters
Silver medal – second place	2013 Tyumen	‍–‍70 kg
IJF Grand Slam
Gold medal – first place	2013 Baku	‍–‍70 kg
Silver medal – second place	2013 Paris	‍–‍70 kg
Silver medal – second place	2014 Tyumen	‍–‍70 kg
Silver medal – second place	2017 Paris	‍–‍70 kg
Bronze medal – third place	2011 Rio de Janeiro	‍–‍70 kg
Bronze medal – third place	2012 Moscow	‍–‍70 kg
Bronze medal – third place	2014 Paris	‍–‍70 kg
Bronze medal – third place	2014 Abu Dhabi	‍–‍70 kg
Bronze medal – third place	2014 Tokyo	‍–‍70 kg
Bronze medal – third place	2015 Tyumen	‍–‍70 kg
IJF Grand Prix
Gold medal – first place	2014 Zagreb	‍–‍70 kg
Silver medal – second place	2018 Tbilisi	‍–‍70 kg
Silver medal – second place	2018 Antalya	‍–‍70 kg
Silver medal – second place	2018 Hohhot	‍–‍70 kg
Silver medal – second place	2019 Montreal	‍–‍70 kg
Bronze medal – third place	2010 Düsseldorf	‍–‍70 kg
Bronze medal – third place	2014 Havana	‍–‍70 kg
Bronze medal – third place	2015 Düsseldorf	‍–‍70 kg
Bronze medal – third place	2015 Zagreb	‍–‍70 kg
Bronze medal – third place	2018 Budapest	‍–‍70 kg
Bronze medal – third place	2018 Cancún	‍–‍70 kg
Bronze medal – third place	2019 Hohhot	‍–‍70 kg
Bronze medal – third place	2019 Budapest	‍–‍70 kg
Bronze medal – third place	2020 Tel Aviv	‍–‍70 kg
Jeux de la Francophonie
Gold medal – first place	2013 Nice	‍–‍70 kg

Profile at external databases
- IJF: 1012
- JudoInside.com: 37703
- Updated on 21 May 2023

Kelita Zupancic (born May 9, 1990) is a judoka from Canada. Zupancic won gold medals for Canada at the 2010, 2013 and 2015 Pan Am judo championships.

== Biography ==
Zupancic was born in Whitby which is a town in the Toronto metro area. She is of Slovenian origin. Her father Eddie is a judo coach and trainer.

She is member of the Formokan Judo Club and she has been training at the National Training Centre in Montreal under the watchful eyes of National Coach Nicolas Gill and Hiroshi Namakura. Through some discussion with Hiroshi Namakura, it was felt that the time was right for Zupancic to train in Japan. Hiroshi Namakura contacted Yoshiyuki Matsuoka who is a former Olympic Champion and head coach at a private women's judo club which is sponsored by the company Komatsu Limited. He suggested to Zupancic that she should go to train at the Komatsu club. Zupancic agreed and Hiroshi Namakura arranged the visit.

In January 2010, Zupancic visited the club for nearly one month. She endured very intense training with some of the top Japanese women in the world. Also coaching at Komatsu club is Kazuhiko Tokuno (Japan National Female Coach) and Mayumi Katsura, both former world class competitors. After her visit, Zupancic went on to win medals at a World Cup in Hungary, and a Grand Prix in Germany and then a gold at the 2010 Pan American Judo Championships in El Salvador.

At the Formokan Judo Club's 35th year reunion (2010), Zupancic announced that she has been offered a position on the Komatsu club Judo team. According to Hiroshi Namakura, one foreign judoka is selected per year and Zupancic was recognized. She was offered a one-year contract to train with the team, work for Komatsu club and compete for them at team events. She competed at the 2012 Summer Olympics, losing to eventual gold winner Lucie Décosse in the second round. At the 2014 World Judo Championships, she finished in 5th place. She has been ranked number one to three in the world between 2012 and 2015.

In June 2016, she was named to Canada's Olympic team. At the 2016 Olympics, she beat Esther Stam in the second round, before losing to Haruka Tachimoto, the eventual champion, in the quarterfinals. Because Tachimoto reached the final, Zupancic was entered into the repechage. In the repechage, she lost to Bernadette Graf.

== See also ==
- Judo in Ontario
- Judo in Canada
- List of Canadian judoka
