= Christophe Lambert (judoka) =

German judoka

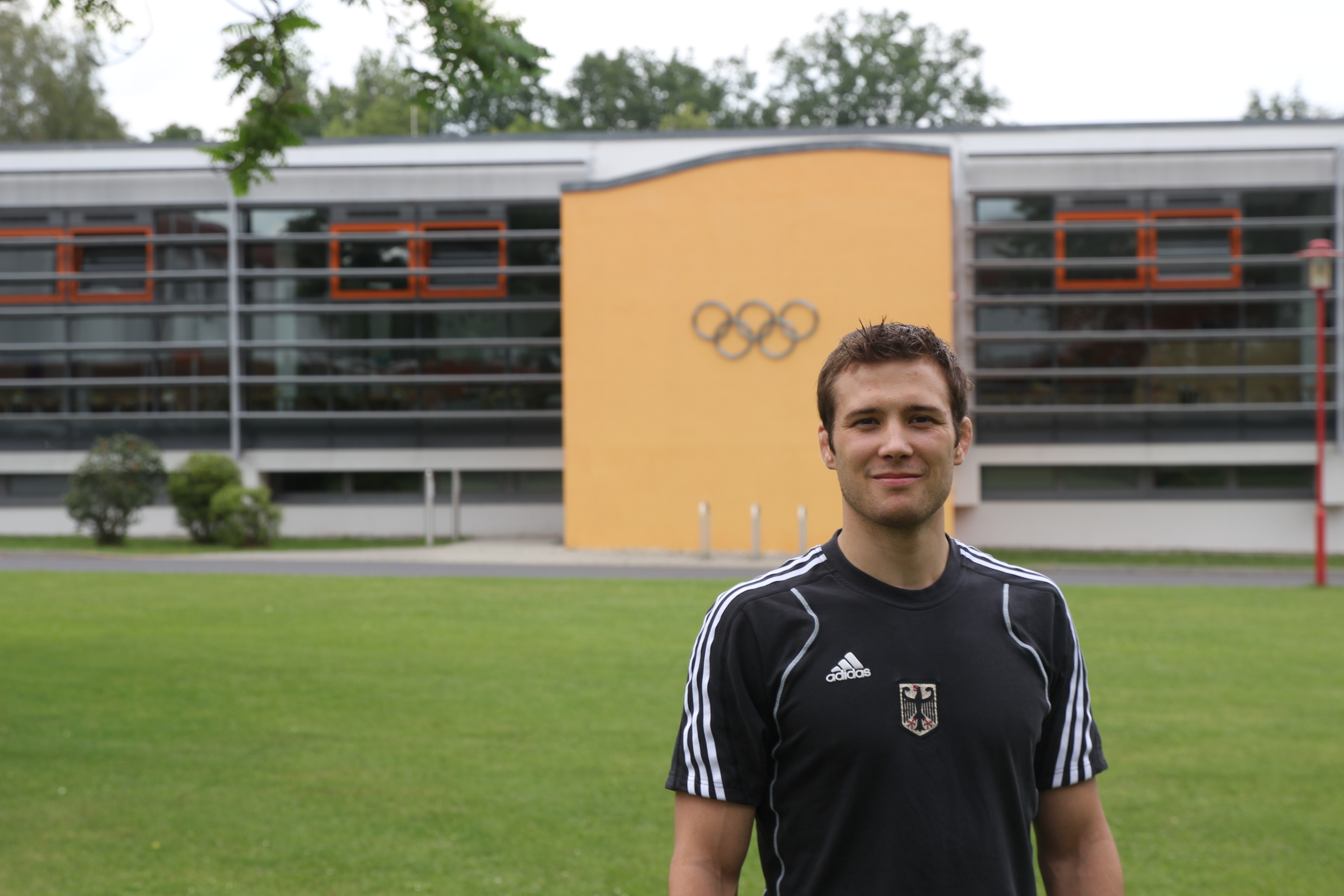
- Lambert in 2012

Personal information
- Born: 3 June 1985 (age 41) Braunschweig, West Germany
- Occupation: Judoka

Sport
- Country: Germany
- Sport: Judo
- Weight class: –90 kg

Achievements and titles
- Olympic Games: R32 (2012)
- European Champ.: (bronze) (2012)
Medal record
Men's judo
Representing Germany
European Championships
Bronze medal – third place	2012 Chelyabinsk	–90 kg
European U23 Championships
Bronze medal – third place	2007 Salzburg	–81 kg

Profile at external databases
- IJF: 1732
- JudoInside.com: 15616
- Updated on 14 November 2022

Christophe Lambert (born 3 June 1985 in Braunschweig) is a German judoka. He competed at the 2012 Summer Olympics in the -90 kg event and lost in the first round to Elkhan Mammadov.

Lambert won the bronze medal at the 2012 European Judo Championships.
