= Deniss Kozlovs =

Latvian judoka (born 1983)

Personal information
- Born: 28 November 1983 (age 42)
- Occupation: Judoka

Sport
- Country: Latvia
- Sport: Judo
- Weight class: –66 kg

Achievements and titles
- World Champ.: 13th (2003)
- European Champ.: (bronze) (2009)
Medal record
Men's judo
Representing Latvia
European Championships
Bronze medal – third place	2009 Tbilisi	–66 kg

Profile at external databases
- IJF: 563
- JudoInside.com: 15299
- Updated on 15 November 2022

Deniss Kozlovs (born 28 November 1983) is a Latvian judoka.

== Achievements ==
Year	Tournament	Place	Weight class
2009	European Championships	3rd	Half lightweight (66 kg)
2006	European Judo Championships	7th	Extra lightweight (60 kg)
2001	European Judo Championships	5th	Lightweight (66 kg)
