= 2010 Judo Grand Prix Rotterdam =

Judo competition

Judo 2010 Judo Grand Prix Rotterdam
- Location: Rotterdam, Netherlands
- Dates: 15–17 October 2010
- Competitors: 292 from 42 nations

Competition at external databases
- Links: IJF • EJU • JudoInside

The 2010 Judo Grand Prix Rotterdam was held in Rotterdam, Netherlands from 15 to 17 October 2010.

== Medal summary ==
=== Men's events ===
Event	Gold	Silver	Bronze
Extra-lightweight (−60 kg)	Amiran Papinashvili (GEO)	Ludwig Paischer (AUT)	Sérgio Pessoa (CAN)
Extra-lightweight (−60 kg)	Amiran Papinashvili (GEO)	Ludwig Paischer (AUT)	Elio Verde (ITA)
Half-lightweight (−66 kg)	Mikhail Pulyaev (RUS)	Francesco Faraldo (ITA)	Miklós Ungvári (HUN)
Half-lightweight (−66 kg)	Mikhail Pulyaev (RUS)	Francesco Faraldo (ITA)	Serhiy Drebot (UKR)
Lightweight (−73 kg)	João Pina (POR)	Dex Elmont (NED)	Tomasz Adamiec (POL)
Lightweight (−73 kg)	João Pina (POR)	Dex Elmont (NED)	Murat Kodzokov (RUS)
Half-middleweight (−81 kg)	Guillaume Elmont (NED)	Takahiro Nakai (JPN)	Antonio Ciano (ITA)
Half-middleweight (−81 kg)	Guillaume Elmont (NED)	Takahiro Nakai (JPN)	Sergiu Toma (MDA)
Middleweight (−90 kg)	Yuya Yoshida (JPN)	Varlam Liparteliani (GEO)	Milan Randl (SVK)
Middleweight (−90 kg)	Yuya Yoshida (JPN)	Varlam Liparteliani (GEO)	Kirill Voprosov (RUS)
Half-heavyweight (−100 kg)	Henk Grol (NED)	Jevgeņijs Borodavko (LAT)	Martin Pacek (SWE)
Half-heavyweight (−100 kg)	Henk Grol (NED)	Jevgeņijs Borodavko (LAT)	Sergei Samoilovich (RUS)
Heavyweight (+100 kg)	Hiroki Tachiyama (JPN)	Vladimirs Osnačs (LAT)	Paolo Bianchessi (ITA)
Heavyweight (+100 kg)	Hiroki Tachiyama (JPN)	Vladimirs Osnačs (LAT)	Stanislav Bondarenko (UKR)

=== Women's events ===
Event	Gold	Silver	Bronze
Extra-lightweight (−48 kg)	Charline Van Snick (BEL)	Alina Dumitru (ROU)	Carmen Bogdan (ROU)
Extra-lightweight (−48 kg)	Charline Van Snick (BEL)	Alina Dumitru (ROU)	Emi Yamagishi (JPN)
Half-lightweight (−52 kg)	Jaana Sundberg (FIN)	Laura Gómez (ESP)	Ana Carrascosa (ESP)
Half-lightweight (−52 kg)	Jaana Sundberg (FIN)	Laura Gómez (ESP)	Pénélope Bonna (FRA)
Lightweight (−57 kg)	Aiko Sato (JPN)	Marlen Hein (GER)	Vesna Đukić (SLO)
Lightweight (−57 kg)	Aiko Sato (JPN)	Marlen Hein (GER)	Viola Wächter (GER)
Half-middleweight (−63 kg)	Elisabeth Willeboordse (NED)	Urška Žolnir (SLO)	Claudia Malzahn (GER)
Half-middleweight (−63 kg)	Elisabeth Willeboordse (NED)	Urška Žolnir (SLO)	Anicka van Emden (NED)
Middleweight (−70 kg)	Haruka Tachimoto (JPN)	Erica Barbieri (ITA)	Linda Bolder (NED)
Middleweight (−70 kg)	Haruka Tachimoto (JPN)	Erica Barbieri (ITA)	Marie Pasquet (FRA)
Half-heavyweight (−78 kg)	Akari Ogata (JPN)	Audrey Tcheuméo (FRA)	Kayla Harrison (USA)
Half-heavyweight (−78 kg)	Akari Ogata (JPN)	Audrey Tcheuméo (FRA)	Catherine Jacques (BEL)
Heavyweight (+78 kg)	Gülşah Kocatürk (TUR)	Anne-Sophie Mondière (FRA)	Belkıs Zehra Kaya (TUR)
Heavyweight (+78 kg)	Gülşah Kocatürk (TUR)	Anne-Sophie Mondière (FRA)	Lucia Tangorre (ITA)

Source Results

=== Medal table ===
* Host nation (Netherlands)

Rank	Nation	Gold	Silver	Bronze	Total
1	Japan (JPN)	5	1	1	7
2	Netherlands (NED)*	3	1	2	6
3	Georgia (GEO)	1	1	0	2
4	Russia (RUS)	1	0	3	4
5	Belgium (BEL)	1	0	1	2
5	Turkey (TUR)	1	0	1	2
7	Finland (FIN)	1	0	0	1
7	Portugal (POR)	1	0	0	1
9	Italy (ITA)	0	2	4	6
10	France (FRA)	0	2	2	4
11	Latvia (LAT)	0	2	0	2
12	Germany (GER)	0	1	2	3
13	Romania (ROU)	0	1	1	2
13	Slovenia (SLO)	0	1	1	2
13	Spain (ESP)	0	1	1	2
16	Austria (AUT)	0	1	0	1
17	Ukraine (UKR)	0	0	2	2
18	Canada (CAN)	0	0	1	1
18	Hungary (HUN)	0	0	1	1
18	Moldova (MDA)	0	0	1	1
18	Poland (POL)	0	0	1	1
18	Slovakia (SVK)	0	0	1	1
18	Sweden (SWE)	0	0	1	1
18	United States (USA)	0	0	1	1
Totals (24 entries)		14	14	28	56
