= 2009 Judo Grand Slam Tokyo =

Judo competition

Judo 2009 Judo Grand Slam Tokyo
- Location: Tokyo, Japan
- Dates: 11–13 December 2009
- Competitors: 396 from 44 nations

Competition at external databases
- Links: IJF • EJU • JudoInside

The 2009 Judo Grand Slam Tokyo was held in Tokyo, Japan, from 11 to 13 December 2009.

== Medal summary ==
=== Men's events ===
Event	Gold	Silver	Bronze
Extra-lightweight (−60 kg)	Masaaki Fukuoka (JPN)	Hiroaki Hiraoka (JPN)	Jin-Min Jang (KOR)
Extra-lightweight (−60 kg)	Masaaki Fukuoka (JPN)	Hiroaki Hiraoka (JPN)	Hirofumi Yamamoto (JPN)
Half-lightweight (−66 kg)	Masashi Ebinuma (JPN)	Kim Joo-jin (KOR)	An Jeong-hwan (KOR)
Half-lightweight (−66 kg)	Masashi Ebinuma (JPN)	Kim Joo-jin (KOR)	Junpei Morishita (JPN)
Lightweight (−73 kg)	Wang Ki-chun (KOR)	Yasuhiro Awano (JPN)	Yuki Nishiyama (JPN)
Lightweight (−73 kg)	Wang Ki-chun (KOR)	Yasuhiro Awano (JPN)	Nicholas Tritton (CAN)
Half-middleweight (−81 kg)	Euan Burton (GBR)	Kim Jae-bum (KOR)	Leandro Guilheiro (BRA)
Half-middleweight (−81 kg)	Euan Burton (GBR)	Kim Jae-bum (KOR)	Katsushi Matsumoto (JPN)
Middleweight (−90 kg)	Takashi Ono (JPN)	Daiki Nishiyama (JPN)	Dilshod Choriev (UZB)
Middleweight (−90 kg)	Takashi Ono (JPN)	Daiki Nishiyama (JPN)	Yuya Yoshida (JPN)
Half-heavyweight (−100 kg)	Hwang Hee-tae (KOR)	Takamasa Anai (JPN)	Lukáš Krpálek (CZE)
Half-heavyweight (−100 kg)	Hwang Hee-tae (KOR)	Takamasa Anai (JPN)	Levan Zhorzholiani (GEO)
Heavyweight (+100 kg)	Kazuhiko Takahashi (JPN)	Keiji Suzuki (JPN)	Martin Padar (EST)
Heavyweight (+100 kg)	Kazuhiko Takahashi (JPN)	Keiji Suzuki (JPN)	Abdullo Tangriev (UZB)

=== Women's events ===
Event	Gold	Silver	Bronze
Extra-lightweight (−48 kg)	Tomoko Fukumi (JPN)	Kaori Kondo (JPN)	Sarah Menezes (BRA)
Extra-lightweight (−48 kg)	Tomoko Fukumi (JPN)	Kaori Kondo (JPN)	Emi Yamagishi (JPN)
Half-lightweight (−52 kg)	Misato Nakamura (JPN)	Petra Nareks (SLO)	Ana Carrascosa (ESP)
Half-lightweight (−52 kg)	Misato Nakamura (JPN)	Petra Nareks (SLO)	Érika Miranda (BRA)
Lightweight (−57 kg)	Hitomi Tokuhisa (JPN)	Kaori Matsumoto (JPN)	Morgane Ribout (FRA)
Lightweight (−57 kg)	Hitomi Tokuhisa (JPN)	Kaori Matsumoto (JPN)	Aiko Sato (JPN)
Half-middleweight (−63 kg)	Yoshie Ueno (JPN)	Ikumi Tanimoto (JPN)	Nozomi Hirai (JPN)
Half-middleweight (−63 kg)	Yoshie Ueno (JPN)	Ikumi Tanimoto (JPN)	Sayuri Yamamoto (JPN)
Middleweight (−70 kg)	Mina Watanabe (JPN)	Anett Mészáros (HUN)	Edith Bosch (NED)
Middleweight (−70 kg)	Mina Watanabe (JPN)	Anett Mészáros (HUN)	Yoriko Kunihara (JPN)
Half-heavyweight (−78 kg)	Akari Ogata (JPN)	Sayaka Anai (JPN)	Ruika Sato (JPN)
Half-heavyweight (−78 kg)	Akari Ogata (JPN)	Sayaka Anai (JPN)	Heide Wollert (GER)
Heavyweight (+78 kg)	Maki Tsukada (JPN)	Elena Ivashchenko (RUS)	Lucija Polavder (SLO)
Heavyweight (+78 kg)	Maki Tsukada (JPN)	Elena Ivashchenko (RUS)	Megumi Tachimoto (JPN)

Source Results

=== Medal table ===
* Host nation (Japan)

Rank	Nation	Gold	Silver	Bronze	Total
1	Japan (JPN)*	11	9	11	31
2	South Korea (KOR)	2	2	3	7
3	Great Britain (GBR)	1	0	0	1
4	Slovenia (SLO)	0	1	1	2
5	Hungary (HUN)	0	1	0	1
5	Russia (RUS)	0	1	0	1
7	Brazil (BRA)	0	0	3	3
8	Uzbekistan (UZB)	0	0	2	2
9	Canada (CAN)	0	0	1	1
9	Czech Republic (CZE)	0	0	1	1
9	Estonia (EST)	0	0	1	1
9	France (FRA)	0	0	1	1
9	Georgia (GEO)	0	0	1	1
9	Germany (GER)	0	0	1	1
9	Netherlands (NED)	0	0	1	1
9	Spain (ESP)	0	0	1	1
Totals (16 entries)		14	14	28	56
