= Soso Palelashvili =

Israeli judoka (born 1986)

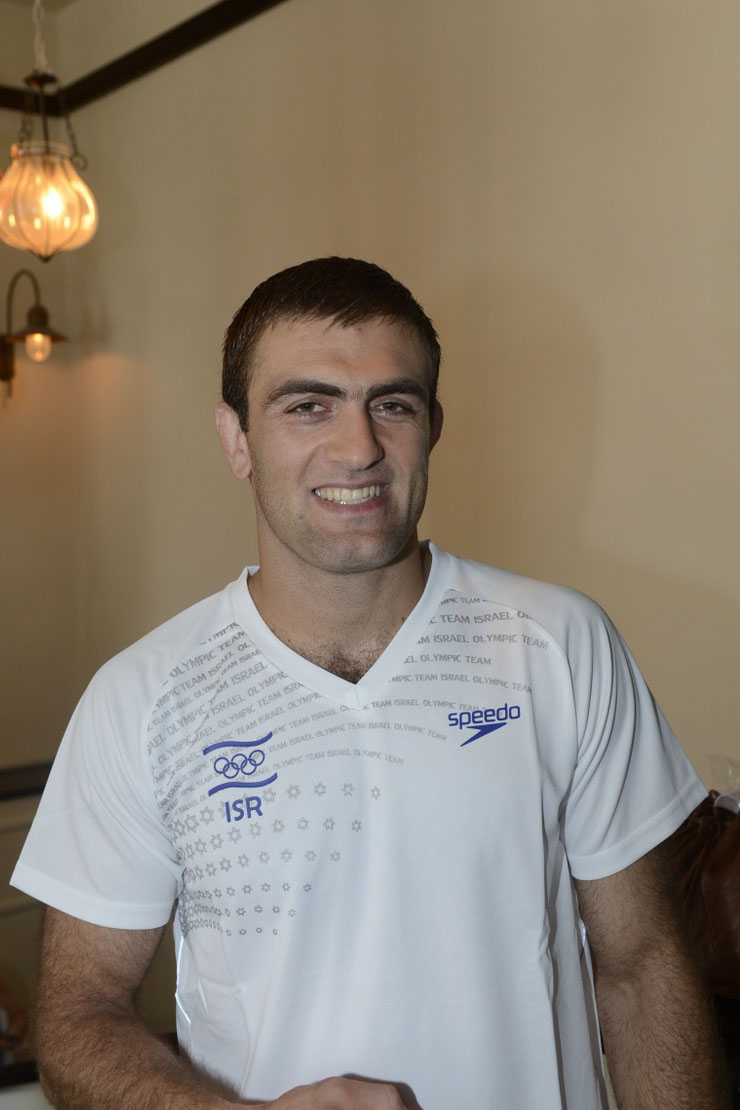
- Soso Palelashvili, 2012

Personal information
- Native name: סוֹסוֹ פָּלֶלַשווילי
- Born: 6 September 1986 (age 39)
- Occupation: Judoka

Sport
- Country: Israel
- Sport: Judo
- Weight class: ‍–‍73 kg

Achievements and titles
- Olympic Games: R16 (2012)
- World Champ.: R64 (2011)
- European Champ.: (bronze) (2012)
Medal record
Men's judo
Representing Israel
European Championships
| Bronze medal – third place | 2012 Chelyabinsk | ‍–‍73 kg |
IJF Grand Prix
| Bronze medal – third place | 2011 Düsseldorf | ‍–‍73 kg |

Profile at external databases
- IJF: 2442
- JudoInside.com: 47507
- Updated on 14 November 2022

Iosef "Soso" Palelashvili (Georgian: სოსო ფალელაშვილი, Hebrew: סוסו פללשווילי; born 6 September 1986, Gori) is an Israeli judoka. He competed in the Lightweight (under 73 kg) weight category.

Palelashvili represented Israel at the 2012 Summer Olympics, competing in the men's 73 kg event. He beat Sezer Huysuz in his first match, but lost the next to Riki Nakaya.

Palelashvili was born in Gori, Georgia and in 2008 made aliyah with his Jewish wife.
