= Euan Burton =

British judoka

Euan Burton MBE
Personal information
- Full name: Euan Michael Burton
- Nationality: British (Scottish)
- Born: 31 March 1979 (age 47) Ascot, Berkshire
- Occupation: Judoka
- Height: 1.82 m (6 ft 0 in)

Sport
- Country: Great Britain
- Sport: Judo
- Weight class: ‍–‍81 kg, ‍–‍90 kg, ‍–‍100 kg
- Rank: 3rd dan black belt

Achievements and titles
- Olympic Games: 7th (2008)
- World Champ.: (bronze) (2007, 2010)
- European Champ.: (bronze) (2005, 2007, 2010)
- Commonwealth Games: (gold) (2014)
Medal record
Men's judo
Representing Great Britain
World Championships
Bronze medal – third place	2007 Rio de Janeiro	‍–‍81 kg
Bronze medal – third place	2010 Tokyo	‍–‍81 kg
European Championships
Bronze medal – third place	2005 Rotterdam	‍–‍81 kg
Bronze medal – third place	2007 Belgrade	‍–‍81 kg
Bronze medal – third place	2010 Vienna	‍–‍81 kg
World Masters
Bronze medal – third place	2011 Baku	‍–‍81 kg
Bronze medal – third place	2012 Almaty	‍–‍81 kg
IJF Grand Slam
Gold medal – first place	2009 Tokyo	‍–‍81 kg
Bronze medal – third place	2010 Tokyo	‍–‍81 kg
IJF Grand Prix
Silver medal – second place	2010 Düsseldorf	‍–‍81 kg
Representing Scotland
Commonwealth Games
Gold medal – first place	2014 Glasgow	‍–‍100 kg

Profile at external databases
- IJF: 101
- JudoInside.com: 6672
- Updated on 25 July 2023

Euan Michael Burton MBE (born 31 March 1979) is a Scottish judoka (a Judo practitioner). His best results include; 2010 World Championship bronze, 2010 Tokyo Grand Slam gold, and 2007 World Championship bronze.

== Biography ==
Burton was born in Ascot, Berkshire but lives in Edinburgh, he was educated at Pencaitland Primary School, Ross High School and the University of Edinburgh. He was an Individual Bursar in 1998-99 at the University.

Burton won the Scottish National Championship in 2000 before winning his first two championships of Great Britain, winning the half-middleweight division at the British Judo Championships in 2002 and 2003.

Burton won a bronze medal at the 2007 World Judo Championships before representing Great Britain at the 2008 Summer Olympics in Beijing, competing in the men's 81 kg division and reaching the quarter finals. Two years later he won a bronze medal at the 2010 World Judo Championships and in 2012 he was selected for the second time to represent Great Britain at the 2012 Summer Olympics, Competing again at the half-middleweight category (81 kg).

In 2012, Burton won his third British National title at the heavier weight of middleweight but then reverted back to half-middleweight for a second appearance at the Olympic Games. Following the Games he then concentrated his efforts as a development coach for JudoScotland.

Burton was named Scotland's flagbearer for the 2014 Commonwealth Games. Traditionally he fought in the -81 kg category but moved up two weightings to fight in the -100 kg category to make the Scottish team for the Commonwealth Games. At the Games, Burton the won gold medal in the ‍–‍100 kg category. Burton later announced his retirement and return to full-time coaching.

Burton was appointed Member of the Order of the British Empire (MBE) in the 2015 New Year Honours for services to judo.

== Personal life ==
He once went to hospital after having a caramel sweet in his lung. He also is a lifelong asthma sufferer. He is married to Gemma Gibbons.
