= Judo at the 2015 Pan American Games – Women's 70 kg =

Women's 70 kg at the 2015 Pan American Games
- Venue: Mississauga Sports Centre
- Dates: July 13
- Competitors: 9 from 9 nations

Medalists
Gold medal	Kelita Zupancic	Canada
Silver medal	Onix Cortés	Cuba
Bronze medal	Maria Portela	Brazil
Bronze medal	Yuri Alvear	Colombia

The women's 70 kg competition of the judo events at the 2015 Pan American Games in Toronto, Canada, was held on July 13 at the Mississauga Sports Centre.

== Schedule ==
All times are Central Standard Time (UTC-6).

Date	Time	Round
July 13, 2015	15:14	Preliminary bout
July 13, 2015	16:10	Quarterfinals
July 13, 2015	16:03	Repechage
July 13, 2015	17:34	Semifinals
July 13, 2015	20:52	Bronze medal matches
July 13, 2015	21:06	Final

== Results ==
Legend

- 1st number = Ippon
- 2nd number = Waza-ari
- 3rd number = Yuko
- H = Hansoku Make (automatic disqualification)

=== Bracket ===
Preliminaries
Jennifer Ortiz (GUA)	000H
Katie Sell (USA)	000

Quarter Finals
Yuri Alvear (COL)	100
Andrea Poo (MEX)	000
Onix Cortés (CUB)	002
Katie Sell (USA)	000
Kelita Zupancic (CAN)	100
Vanessa Chala (ECU)	000S2
Maria Portela (BRA)	100S1
Elvismar Rodriguez (VEN)	000

Semi Finals
Yuri Alvear (COL)	000
Onix Cortés (CUB)	100S2
Kelita Zupancic (CAN)	002S1
Maria Portela (BRA)	001S2

Final
Onix Cortés (CUB)	000
Kelita Zupancic (CAN)	100S1

=== Repechage round ===
Two bronze medals were awarded.

Repechage		Bronze medal
Andrea Poo (MEX)	000S2
Kattie Sell (USA)	000S3	Andrea Poo (MEX)	000S1
		Maria Portela (BRA)	000

Repechage		Bronze medal
Vanessa Chala (ECU)	011S1
Elvismar Rodríguez (VEN)	010S1	Vanessa Chala (ECU)	000S2
		Yuri Alvear (COL)	010
