= Francesco Bruyere =

Italian judoka

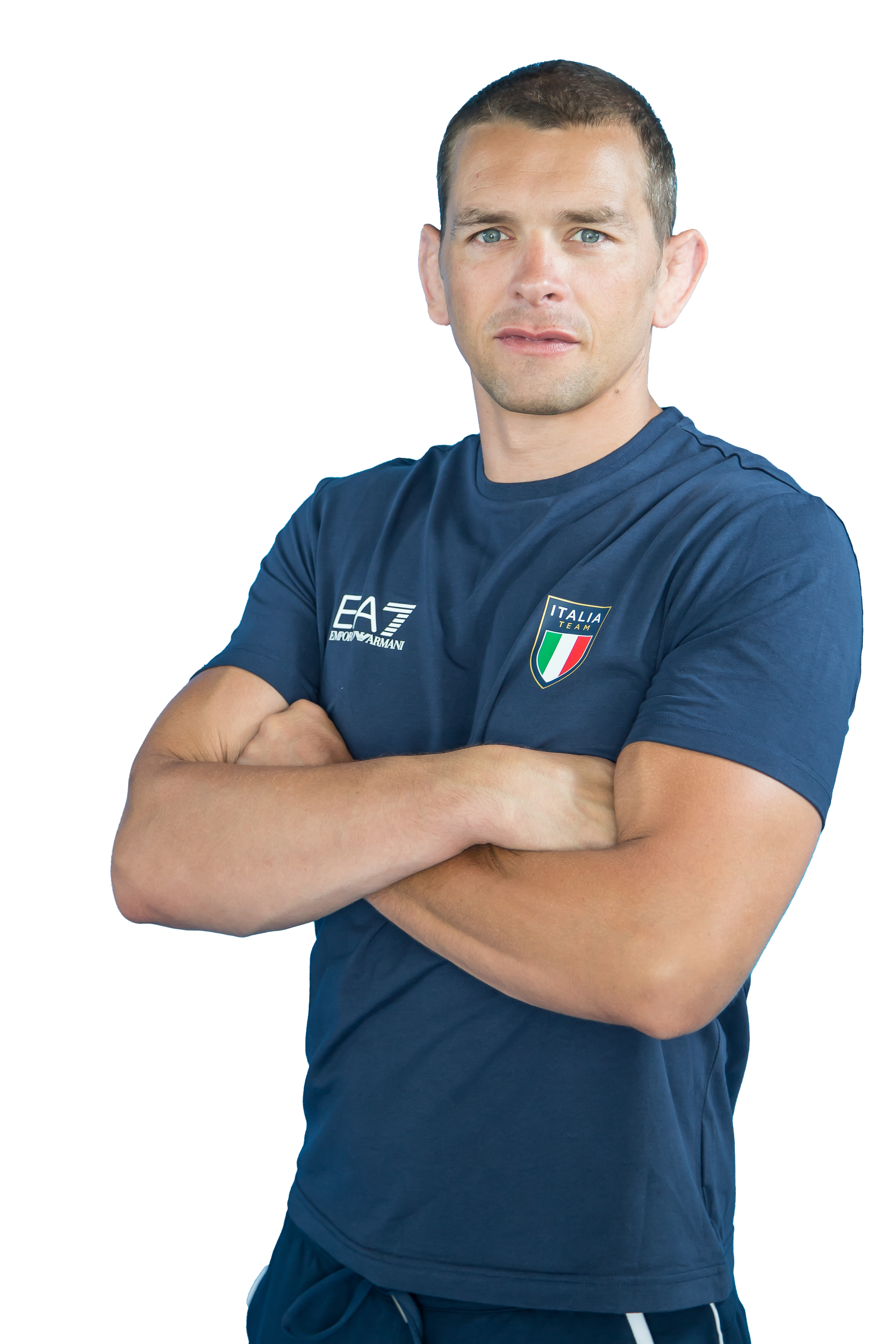

Personal information
- Born: 27 August 1980 (age 46)
- Occupation: Judoka

Sport
- Country: Italy
- Sport: Judo
- Weight class: –73 kg

Achievements and titles
- World Champ.: (silver) (2005)
- European Champ.: 5th (2004)
Medal record
Men's judo
Representing Italy
World Championships
Silver medal – second place	2005 Cairo	–73 kg
European Junior Championships
Bronze medal – third place	1999 Rome	–66 kg

Profile at external databases
- IJF: 2637
- JudoInside.com: 9553
- Updated on 19 November 2022

Francesco Bruyere (born 27 August 1980 in Carmagnola) is an Italian judoka.

== Achievements ==
Year	Tournament	Place	Weight class
2006	European Judo Championships	7th	Lightweight (73 kg)
2005	World Judo Championships	2nd	Lightweight (73 kg)
2004	European Judo Championships	5th	Lightweight (73 kg)
