= Karen Nun-Ira =

Japanese judoka (born 1991)

Personal information
- Born: 23 May 1991 (age 35)
- Occupation: Judoka

Sport
- Country: Japan
- Sport: Judo
- Weight class: –70 kg

Achievements and titles
- World Champ.: (silver) (2014)
- Asian Champ.: (bronze) (2013, 2015)
Medal record
Women's judo
Representing Japan
World Championships
Silver medal – second place	2014 Chelyabinsk	‍–‍70 kg
Asian Championships
Bronze medal – third place	2013 Bangkok	‍–‍70 kg
Bronze medal – third place	2015 Kuwait City	‍–‍70 kg
IJF Grand Prix
Bronze medal – third place	2014 Budapest	‍–‍70 kg

Profile at external databases
- IJF: 10014
- JudoInside.com: 45840
- Updated on 4 July 2023

Karen Nun Ira (ヌンイラ 華蓮, Nun'ira Karen; born 23 May 1991 in Funabashi, Chiba) is a Japanese judoka.

Her mother is Japanese and a feng shui master, while her father is Ghanaian.

Nun-Ira started judo at the age of 14.

In 2010, Nun-Ira entered International Pacific University and was trained by former Olympic and world champion Toshihiko Koga.

In 2014, Nun-Ira belonged to Ryotokuji Gakuen after graduating from the university.

Nun-Ira won the silver medal in the middleweight division (‍–‍70 kg) at the 2014 World Judo Championships.
