= Cecilia Blanco =

Spanish judoka

Personal information
- Full name: Cecilia Blanco García
- Born: 23 February 1979 (age 47) Madrid, Spain
- Occupation: Judoka

Sport
- Country: Spain
- Sport: Judo
- Weight class: ‍–‍70 kg

Achievements and titles
- Olympic Games: 7th (2004)
- World Champ.: 5th (2001, 2010)
- European Champ.: (silver) (2001, 2004, 2011)
Medal record
Women's judo
Representing Spain
European Championships
Silver medal – second place	2001 Paris	‍–‍70 kg
Silver medal – second place	2004 Bucharest	‍–‍70 kg
Silver medal – second place	2011 Istanbul	‍–‍70 kg
Bronze medal – third place	2010 Vienna	‍–‍70 kg
IJF Grand Slam
Silver medal – second place	2011 Tokyo	‍–‍70 kg
IJF Grand Prix
Silver medal – second place	2010 Abu Dhabi	‍–‍70 kg
Bronze medal – third place	2011 Baku	‍–‍70 kg

Profile at external databases
- IJF: 424
- JudoInside.com: 6201
- Updated on 15 November 2022

Cecilia Blanco García (Note: In this Spanish name, the first or paternal surname is Blanco and the second or maternal family name is García.) (born 23 February 1979 in Madrid) is a Spanish judoka. She competed in two Summer Olympics: in 2004 in Athens in the 70 kg event where she lost the repechage semifinals to Qin Dongya and in 2012 in London in the 70 kg event where she lost her second match to Raša Sraka. Blanco won three silver medals (2001, 2004, 2011) and one bronze medal (2010) at the European Judo Championships.
