= Tariel Zintiridis =

Greek judoka

Personal information
- Born: 20 December 1987 (age 38)
- Occupation: Judoka

Sport
- Country: Greece
- Sport: Judo
- Weight class: –66 kg

Achievements and titles
- Olympic Games: R32 (2008)
- World Champ.: 9th (2007)
- European Champ.: 7th (2007)
Medal record
Men's judo
Representing Greece
European U23 Championships
Gold medal – first place	2004 Ljubljana	–66 kg
Gold medal – first place	2007 Salzburg	–66 kg
Bronze medal – third place	2003 Yerevan	–66 kg
Bronze medal – third place	2005 Kyiv	–60 kg
World Juniors Championships
Gold medal – first place	2006 Santo Domingo	–66 kg
European Junior Championships
Gold medal – first place	2004 Sofia	–66 kg
Bronze medal – third place	2005 Zagreb	–66 kg
European Cadet Championships
Gold medal – first place	2003 Baku	–66 kg
European Youth Olympic Festival
Gold medal – first place	2003 Paris	–66 kg

Profile at external databases
- IJF: 5927
- JudoInside.com: 31047
- Updated on 11 January 2023

Tariel Zintiridis (Greek: Ταριέλ Ζιντιρίδης, born 20 December 1987 in Tbilisi) is a Greek judoka.

== Achievements ==
Year	Tournament	Place	Weight class
2007	European Judo Championships	7th	Half lightweight (66 kg)
