= 2003 European Cadet Judo Championships =

Judo competition

Judo 2003 European Cadet Judo Championships
- Location: Baku, Azerbaijan
- Dates: 23–24 August 2003

Competition at external databases
- Links: JudoInside

The 2003 European Cadet Judo Championships is an edition of the European Cadet Judo Championships, organised by the International Judo Federation. It was held in Baku, Azerbaijan, from 23 to 24 August 2003.

== Medal summary ==
=== Medal table ===
* Host nation (Azerbaijan)

Rank	Nation	Gold	Silver	Bronze	Total
1	Azerbaijan (AZE)*	3	3	2	8
2	France (FRA)	2	2	2	6
3	Georgia (GEO)	2	1	3	6
4	Netherlands (NED)	2	0	2	4
5	Russia (RUS)	1	3	1	5
6	Ukraine (UKR)	1	2	3	6
7	Hungary (HUN)	1	0	3	4
8	Great Britain (GBR)	1	0	1	2
9	Greece (GRE)	1	0	0	1
9	Slovakia (SVK)	1	0	0	1
9	Turkey (TUR)	1	0	0	1
12	Germany (GER)	0	3	2	5
13	Romania (ROU)	0	1	4	5
14	Belgium (BEL)	0	1	1	2
15	Poland (POL)	0	0	2	2
15	Serbia (SRB)	0	0	2	2
17	Belarus (BLR)	0	0	1	1
17	Estonia (EST)	0	0	1	1
17	Latvia (LAT)	0	0	1	1
17	Portugal (POR)	0	0	1	1
Totals (20 entries)		16	16	32	64

=== Men's events ===
Event	Gold	Silver	Bronze
−50 kg	Lasha Tvildiani (GEO)	Nijat Shikhalizada (AZE)	Hevorh Hevorhyan (UKR)
−50 kg	Lasha Tvildiani (GEO)	Nijat Shikhalizada (AZE)	Tomasz Kowalski (POL)
−55 kg	Elman Nasibov (AZE)	Dan Fâșie (ROU)	David Asumbani (GEO)
−55 kg	Elman Nasibov (AZE)	Dan Fâșie (ROU)	Serhiy Drebot (UKR)
−60 kg	Elshan Karimov (AZE)	Kurban-Gadzhi Musaev (RUS)	István Joo (HUN)
−60 kg	Elshan Karimov (AZE)	Kurban-Gadzhi Musaev (RUS)	Alexei Staushy (BLR)
−66 kg	Tariel Zintiridis (GRE)	Seymur Rzazade (AZE)	Julien Bouquillon (FRA)
−66 kg	Tariel Zintiridis (GRE)	Seymur Rzazade (AZE)	Ioseb Kumladze (GEO)
−73 kg	Levan Peradze (GEO)	Timur Alikhanov (AZE)	Alexandru Salincean (ROU)
−73 kg	Levan Peradze (GEO)	Timur Alikhanov (AZE)	Gergely Szemán (HUN)
−81 kg	Milan Randl (SVK)	Tamerlan Urtaev (RUS)	Anar Aliyev (AZE)
−81 kg	Milan Randl (SVK)	Tamerlan Urtaev (RUS)	Giorgi Demetrashvili (GEO)
−90 kg	Hervé Fichot (FRA)	Murad Idashev (RUS)	Dominik Gerzer (GER)
−90 kg	Hervé Fichot (FRA)	Murad Idashev (RUS)	Vladimirs Osnačs (LAT)
+90 kg	Cyrille Maret (FRA)	Alex Gviniashvili (GEO)	Ruslan Kozaev (RUS)
+90 kg	Cyrille Maret (FRA)	Alex Gviniashvili (GEO)	Mekhman Novruzov (AZE)

=== Women's events ===
Event	Gold	Silver	Bronze
−40 kg	Anna Vasylevich (UKR)	Sonia Bode (GER)	Michaela Hunter (GBR)
−40 kg	Anna Vasylevich (UKR)	Sonia Bode (GER)	Jelena Milutinovic (SRB)
−44 kg	Burcu Gokoz (TUR)	Rebecca King (GER)	Andreea Catuna Ionas (ROU)
−44 kg	Burcu Gokoz (TUR)	Rebecca King (GER)	Lilla Tóth (HUN)
−48 kg	Anna Mazunina (RUS)	Oksana Rebenok (UKR)	Kitty Bravik (NED)
−48 kg	Anna Mazunina (RUS)	Oksana Rebenok (UKR)	Sandrine Castaldo (FRA)
−52 kg	Jasmy van Spankeren (NED)	Élodie Puget (FRA)	Julia Bezko (EST)
−52 kg	Jasmy van Spankeren (NED)	Élodie Puget (FRA)	Jovana Rogić (SRB)
−57 kg	Ramila Yusubova (AZE)	Maxine Fricher (FRA)	Joana Cesario (POR)
−57 kg	Ramila Yusubova (AZE)	Maxine Fricher (FRA)	Oana Laura Mustetea (ROU)
−63 kg	Esther Stam (NED)	Laure Aerts (BEL)	Nataliya Malikova (UKR)
−63 kg	Esther Stam (NED)	Laure Aerts (BEL)	Andrea Wolf (GER)
−70 kg	Anett Mészáros (HUN)	Tetyana Savenko (UKR)	Loesje Crauwels (BEL)
−70 kg	Anett Mészáros (HUN)	Tetyana Savenko (UKR)	Jennifer Kuijpers (NED)
+70 kg	Abbie Cunningham (GBR)	Janina Waldhausen (GER)	Nina Kucharska (POL)
+70 kg	Abbie Cunningham (GBR)	Janina Waldhausen (GER)	Alexandra Matasaru (ROU)

Source Results
