= Mina Watanabe =

Japanese judoka

Personal information
- Born: 16 September 1985 (age 40)
- Occupation: Judoka

Sport
- Country: Japan
- Sport: Judo
- Weight class: ‍–‍70 kg

Achievements and titles
- World Champ.: (bronze) (2009)
- Asian Champ.: (gold) (2005)
Medal record
Women's judo
Representing Japan
World Championships
Bronze medal – third place	2009 Rotterdam	‍–‍70 kg
Asian Championships
Gold medal – first place	2005 Tashkent	‍–‍70 kg
IJF Grand Slam
Gold medal – first place	2009 Tokyo	‍–‍70 kg
Bronze medal – third place	2008 Tokyo	‍–‍70 kg
IJF Grand Prix
Gold medal – first place	2009 Hamburg	‍–‍70 kg
Gold medal – first place	2010 Düsseldorf	‍–‍70 kg
Bronze medal – third place	2009 Tunis	‍–‍70 kg
Asian Junior Championships
Gold medal – first place	2003 Macau	‍–‍70 kg

Profile at external databases
- IJF: 77
- JudoInside.com: 30385
- Updated on 5 September 2023

Mina Watanabe (渡邉 美奈, Watanabe Mina; born 16 September 1985 in Mito, Ibaraki) is a Japanese judoka.

Watanabe is from Mito, Ibaraki. After graduation from high school, she worked for Komatsu Limited.

Watanabe won the bronze medal in the Middleweight (70 kg) division at the 2009 World Judo Championships.
