= Onix Cortés =

Cuban judoka (born 1988)

Personal information
- Full name: Onix Cortés Aldama
- Born: 12 December 1988 (age 37) Havana, Cuba
- Occupation: Judoka

Sport
- Country: Cuba
- Sport: Judo
- Weight class: –70 kg

Achievements and titles
- Olympic Games: R16 (2012)
- World Champ.: (bronze) (2014)
- Pan American Champ.: (2011)
Medal record
Women's judo
Representing Cuba
World Championships
Bronze medal – third place	2014 Chelyabinsk	‍–‍70 kg
Pan American Games
Gold medal – first place	2011 Guadalajara	‍–‍70 kg
Silver medal – second place	2015 Toronto	‍–‍70 kg
Bronze medal – third place	2019 Lima	‍–‍70 kg
Pan American Championships
Gold medal – first place	2011 Guadalajara	‍–‍70 kg
Silver medal – second place	2012 Montreal	‍–‍70 kg
Silver medal – second place	2013 San José	‍–‍70 kg
Bronze medal – third place	2007 Montreal	‍–‍70 kg
Bronze medal – third place	2010 San Salvador	‍–‍70 kg
Bronze medal – third place	2015 Edmonton	‍–‍70 kg
Bronze medal – third place	2018 San José	‍–‍70 kg
IJF Grand Prix
Silver medal – second place	2013 Miami	‍–‍70 kg
Bronze medal – third place	2012 Düsseldorf	‍–‍70 kg
World Juniors Championships
Gold medal – first place	2006 Santo Domingo	‍–‍63 kg
Summer Universiade
Bronze medal – third place	2013 Kazan	‍–‍70 kg

Profile at external databases
- IJF: 953
- JudoInside.com: 43042
- Updated on 4 July 2023

Onix Cortés Aldama (Note: In this Spanish name, the first or paternal surname is Cortés and the second or maternal family name is Aldama.) (born 12 December 1988) is a Cuban judoka. She competed for Cuba at the 2012 Summer Olympics, but was knocked out in her first match by Haruka Tachimoto.
