= Jaana Sundberg =

Finnish judoka

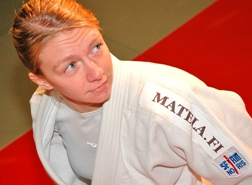

Personal information
- Born: 2 April 1983 (age 43)
- Occupation: Judoka

Sport
- Country: Finland
- Sport: Judo
- Weight class: –52 kg

Achievements and titles
- Olympic Games: R32 (2012)
- World Champ.: 5th (2013)
- European Champ.: 5th (2005, 2009, 2011)
Medal record
Women's judo
Representing Finland
IJF Grand Slam
Gold medal – first place	2013 Baku	–52 kg
Gold medal – first place	2013 Moscow	–52 kg
Silver medal – second place	2014 Paris	–52 kg
IJF Grand Prix
Gold medal – first place	2010 Rotterdam	–52 kg
Gold medal – first place	2015 Tbilisi	–52 kg
Bronze medal – third place	2011 Abu Dhabi	–52 kg
European U23 Championships
Bronze medal – third place	2005 Kyiv	–52 kg

Profile at external databases
- IJF: 457
- JudoInside.com: 10262
- Updated on 27 November 2022

Jaana Jokinen (Sundberg) is a Finnish judoka who competes in the women's 52 kg category. At the 2012 Summer Olympics, she was defeated in the first round. She is married to the 2012 olympian Valtteri Jokinen.

Since 2018, Jokinen has worked as the head of coaching for the Finnish Judo Federation.
