= Gülşah Kocatürk =

Turkish judoka (born 1986)

Personal information
- Born: 1 January 1986 (age 40) İzmir, Turkey
- Occupation: Judoka
- Height: 1.80 m (5 ft 11 in) (2012)
- Weight: 139 kg (306 lb) (2012)

Sport
- Country: Turkey
- Sport: Judo
- Weight class: +78 kg
- Club: İzmir Büyükşehir Belediyespor
- Coached by: Mesut Kapan

Achievements and titles
- Olympic Games: R16 (2012)
- World Champ.: 5th (2009)
- European Champ.: (bronze) (2009)
Medal record
Women's judo
Representing Turkey
European Championships
Bronze medal – third place	2009 Tbilisi	+78 kg
IJF Grand Slam
Silver medal – second place	2011 Rio de Janeiro	+78 kg
Bronze medal – third place	2011 Moscow	+78 kg
Bronze medal – third place	2013 Baku	+78 kg
IJF Grand Prix
Gold medal – first place	2010 Rotterdam	+78 kg
Gold medal – first place	2014 Tbilisi	+78 kg
Silver medal – second place	2014 Ulaanbaatar	+78 kg
Bronze medal – third place	2013 Samsun	+78 kg
Bronze medal – third place	2014 Samsun	+78 kg
European U23 Championships
Gold medal – first place	2008 Zagreb	+78 kg
Bronze medal – third place	2005 Kyiv	+78 kg
World Juniors Championships
Bronze medal – third place	2004 Budapest	+78 kg
European Junior Championships
Gold medal – first place	2005 Zagreb	+78 kg
Silver medal – second place	2004 Sofia	+78 kg
Mediterranean Games
Bronze medal – third place	2009 Pescara	+78 kg

Profile at external databases
- IJF: 520
- JudoInside.com: 26982
- Updated on 16 November 2022

Gülşah Kocatürk (born 1 January 1986) is a Turkish judoka competing in the heavyweight (78 kg+) division. As of 2009 she is a member of İzmir Büyükşehir Belediyespor.

== Biography ==
Gülşah Kocatürk was born on January 1, 1986, in İzmir. She studied physical education and sports at Balıkesir University.

She won a bronze medal at the 2009 Mediterranean Games held in Pescara, Italy and another bronze medal at the 2009 European Judo Championships in Tbilisi, Georgia. In 2009, she won the silver medal at the World Judo Cup held in Madrid, Spain. At the 2008 European Junior Judo Championships in Zagreb, Croatia, Kocatürk received the gold medal.

Gülşah Kocatürk qualified for participation at the 2012 Summer Olympics, where she lost in the second round to Iryna Kindzerska.

== Achievements ==
Year	Tournament	Place	Weight class
2009	Mediterranean Games	3rd	Heavyweight (+78 kg)
2009	World Cup	2nd	Heavyweight (+78 kg)
2009	European Championships	3rd	Heavyweight (+78 kg)
2008	European Juniors Championships	1st	Heavyweight (+78 kg)
2007	European Championships	7th	Heavyweight (+78 kg)

== See also ==
- Turkish women in sports
