= Antonio Ciano =

Italian judoka (born 1981)

Personal information
- Born: 9 April 1981 (age 45) Torre del Greco, Italy
- Occupation: Judoka

Sport
- Country: Italy
- Sport: Judo
- Weight class: ‍–‍81 kg

Achievements and titles
- Olympic Games: R32 (2012)
- World Champ.: 5th (2009)
- European Champ.: (silver) (2009)
Medal record
Men's judo
Representing Italy
European Championships
Silver medal – second place	2009 Tbilisi	‍–‍81 kg
IJF Grand Slam
Silver medal – second place	2012 Paris	‍–‍81 kg
IJF Grand Prix
Silver medal – second place	2014 Qingdao	‍–‍81 kg
Bronze medal – third place	2010 Rotterdam	‍–‍81 kg
Mediterranean Games
Bronze medal – third place	2009 Pescara	‍–‍81 kg

Profile at external databases
- IJF: 660
- JudoInside.com: 15243
- Updated on 16 November 2022

Antonio Ciano (born 9 April 1981) is an Italian judoka. He competed in the men's 81 kg event at the 2012 Summer Olympics and was eliminated in the second round by Ole Bischof.

== Coaching ==
Ciano coached the Gruppi Sportivi Fiamme Gialle Judo team, and that led to two of the club members becoming world champions
