= Katarzyna Kłys =

Polish judoka (born 1986)

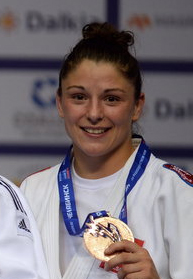

Personal information
- Born: 23 April 1986 (age 40) Bielsko-Biała, Poland
- Occupation: Judoka

Sport
- Country: Poland
- Sport: Judo
- Weight class: –70 kg

Achievements and titles
- Olympic Games: R16 (2016)
- World Champ.: (bronze) (2014)
- European Champ.: (silver) (2007, 2012)
Medal record
Women's judo
Representing Poland
World Championships
Bronze medal – third place	2014 Chelyabinsk	‍–‍70 kg
European Championships
Silver medal – second place	2007 Belgrade	‍–‍70 kg
Silver medal – second place	2012 Chelyabinsk	‍–‍70 kg
IJF Grand Slam
Bronze medal – third place	2011 Tokyo	‍–‍70 kg
Bronze medal – third place	2014 Baku	‍–‍70 kg
Bronze medal – third place	2014 Abu Dhabi	‍–‍70 kg
Bronze medal – third place	2015 Abu Dhabi	‍–‍70 kg
IJF Grand Prix
Silver medal – second place	2014 Zagreb	‍–‍70 kg
Silver medal – second place	2016 Zagreb	‍–‍70 kg
Bronze medal – third place	2014 Tashkent	‍–‍70 kg
Bronze medal – third place	2015 Tashkent	‍–‍70 kg
Bronze medal – third place	2015 Qingdao	‍–‍70 kg
Bronze medal – third place	2016 Almaty	‍–‍70 kg
World Juniors Championships
Bronze medal – third place	2004 Budapest	‍–‍70 kg
European Junior Championships
Silver medal – second place	2004 Sofia	‍–‍70 kg

Profile at external databases
- IJF: 1751
- JudoInside.com: 25798
- Updated on 4 July 2023

Katarzyna Kłys (née Piłocik, 23 April 1986) is a Polish judoka. She represented Poland in the 70 kg event of the 2008 Summer Olympics and lost in the quarter-finals to Ronda Rousey. Four years later, she lost her first round match to Chen Fei in the 70 kg event of the 2012 Summer Olympics. Kłys is a two-time silver medalist in her weight class at the European championships (2007 and 2012). She won another silver medal in the team event of the 2010 European Judo Championships.
