= Juliane Robra =

Swiss judoka (born 1983)

Personal information
- Nationality: Swiss
- Born: 8 January 1983 (age 43) Herdecke, Germany
- Occupation: Judoka
- Height: 1.78 m (5 ft 10 in)

Sport
- Country: Switzerland
- Sport: Judo
- Weight class: ‍–‍70 kg
- Club: Shung Do Kwan, Geneva
- Team: Joshi Team Genève (SUI), KSV Esslingen (GER), SGS Judo (FRA)
- Turned pro: 2005
- Coached by: Takahiro Nakamura, Monika Kurath, Dirk Radszat, Leo Held
- Retired: 2016
- Now coaching: Shung Do Kwan, Geneva

Achievements and titles
- Olympic Games: R16 (2012)
- World Champ.: 7th (2009)
- European Champ.: (bronze) (2010, 2012)
- Highest world ranking: 6
Medal record
Women's Judo
Representing Switzerland
European Championships
| Bronze medal – third place | 2010 Vienna | ‍–‍70 kg |
| Bronze medal – third place | 2012 Chelyabinsk | ‍–‍70 kg |
IJF Grand Slam
| Bronze medal – third place | 2011 Moscow | ‍–‍70 kg |
| Bronze medal – third place | 2013 Baku | ‍–‍70 kg |
IJF Grand Prix
| Bronze medal – third place | 2009 Qingdao | ‍–‍70 kg |
| Bronze medal – third place | 2010 Abu Dhabi | ‍–‍70 kg |
| Bronze medal – third place | 2011 Düsseldorf | ‍–‍70 kg |
| Bronze medal – third place | 2013 Düsseldorf | ‍–‍70 kg |
| Bronze medal – third place | 2013 Ulaanbaatar | ‍–‍70 kg |
European U23 Championships
| Silver medal – second place | 2005 Kyiv | ‍–‍63 kg |

Profile at external databases
- IJF: 235
- JudoInside.com: 18736
- Updated on 14 November 2022

Juliane Robra (born 8 January 1983, in Herdecke, Germany) is a Swiss retired judoka that competed in the 70 kg-category and currently 4th Dan. Robra won bronze medals at the 2010 and the 2012 European Judo Championships, and is an eight time Swiss national champion. In 2012, she was nominated to compete as a member of the Swiss team in the 2012 Summer Olympics in London.
