= Raša Sraka =

Slovenian judoka (born 1979)

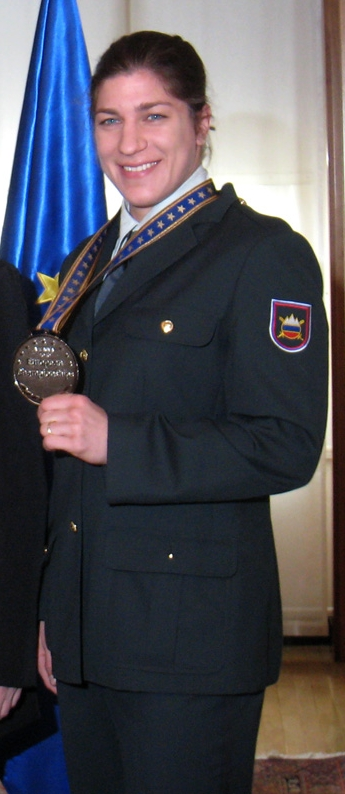

Personal information
- Full name: Raša Sraka Vuković
- Born: 10 October 1979 (age 46)
- Occupation: Judoka

Sport
- Country: Slovenia
- Sport: Judo
- Weight class: ‍–‍70 kg

Achievements and titles
- Olympic Games: 7th (2012)
- World Champ.: (bronze) (2005, 2010)
- European Champ.: (gold) (2003)
Medal record
Women's judo
Representing Slovenia
World Championships
Bronze medal – third place	2005 Cairo	‍–‍70 kg
Bronze medal – third place	2010 Tokyo	‍–‍70 kg
European Championships
Gold medal – first place	2003 Düsseldorf	‍–‍70 kg
Silver medal – second place	2010 Vienna	‍–‍70 kg
Bronze medal – third place	2002 Maribor	‍–‍70 kg
Bronze medal – third place	2004 Bucharest	‍–‍70 kg
Bronze medal – third place	2012 Chelyabinsk	‍–‍70 kg
IJF Grand Slam
Bronze medal – third place	2010 Rio de Janeiro	‍–‍70 kg
Bronze medal – third place	2010 Tokyo	‍–‍70 kg
Bronze medal – third place	2012 Moscow	‍–‍70 kg
IJF Grand Prix
Gold medal – first place	2009 Tunis	‍–‍70 kg
Gold medal – first place	2010 Abu Dhabi	‍–‍70 kg
Gold medal – first place	2012 Düsseldorf	‍–‍70 kg
Gold medal – first place	2012 Baku	‍–‍70 kg
Silver medal – second place	2010 Tunis	‍–‍70 kg
Bronze medal – third place	2009 Hamburg	‍–‍70 kg
Bronze medal – third place	2010 Düsseldorf	‍–‍70 kg
World Juniors Championships
Bronze medal – third place	1998 Cali	‍–‍63 kg
European Junior Championships
Silver medal – second place	1997 Ljubljana	‍–‍66 kg
Bronze medal – third place	1998 Bucharest	‍–‍63 kg
Mediterranean Games
Gold medal – first place	2001 Tunis	‍–‍70 kg
Silver medal – second place	2005 Almeria	‍–‍70 kg
Silver medal – second place	2009 Pescara	‍–‍70 kg

Profile at external databases
- IJF: 258
- JudoInside.com: 3423
- Updated on 25 July 2023

Raša Sraka Vuković (born 10 October 1979 in Ljubljana, Slovenia) is a Slovenian judoka. She competed in the 70 kg event at the 2012 Summer Olympics where she lost in the quarterfinals to Hwang Ye-sul and in the repechage to Yuri Alvear.
