= Edith Bosch =

Dutch judoka (born 1980)

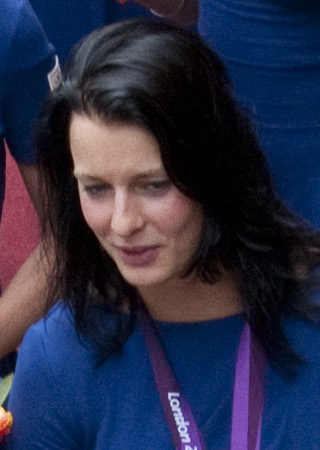

Personal information
- Nicknames: Bambi; Mrs. Slam; The Boss
- Born: 31 May 1980 (age 46) Den Helder, North Holland, the Netherlands
- Occupation: Judoka
- Height: 1.83 m (6 ft 0 in)
- Website: Official website

Sport
- Country: Netherlands
- Sport: Judo
- Weight class: –70 kg
- Club: De Korte Sport Instituut
- Coached by: Chris de Korte

Achievements and titles
- Olympic Games: (silver) (2004)
- World Champ.: (2005)
- European Champ.: (gold) (2004, 2005, 2011, 2012)
Medal record
Women's judo
Representing the Netherlands
Olympic Games
Silver medal – second place	2004 Athens	‍–‍70 kg
Bronze medal – third place	2008 Beijing	‍–‍70 kg
Bronze medal – third place	2012 London	‍–‍70 kg
World Championships
Gold medal – first place	2005 Cairo	‍–‍70 kg
Silver medal – second place	2011 Paris	‍–‍70 kg
Bronze medal – third place	2003 Osaka	‍–‍70 kg
European Championships
Gold medal – first place	2004 Bucharest	‍–‍70 kg
Gold medal – first place	2005 Rotterdam	‍–‍70 kg
Gold medal – first place	2011 Istanbul	‍–‍70 kg
Gold medal – first place	2012 Chelyabinsk	‍–‍70 kg
Silver medal – second place	2002 Maribor	‍–‍70 kg
Bronze medal – third place	2007 Belgrade	‍–‍70 kg
Bronze medal – third place	2009 Tbilisi	‍–‍70 kg
World Masters
Bronze medal – third place	2011 Baku	‍–‍70 kg
Bronze medal – third place	2012 Almaty	‍–‍70 kg
IJF Grand Slam
Gold medal – first place	2011 Moscow	‍–‍70 kg
Silver medal – second place	2009 Moscow	‍–‍70 kg
Silver medal – second place	2010 Rio de Janeiro	‍–‍70 kg
Silver medal – second place	2010 Moscow	‍–‍70 kg
Silver medal – second place	2010 Tokyo	‍–‍70 kg
Bronze medal – third place	2009 Rio de Janeiro	‍–‍70 kg
Bronze medal – third place	2009 Tokyo	‍–‍70 kg
Bronze medal – third place	2011 Paris	‍–‍70 kg
IJF Grand Prix
Gold medal – first place	2011 Baku	‍–‍70 kg
Gold medal – first place	2011 Amsterdam	‍–‍70 kg
Bronze medal – third place	2010 Abu Dhabi	‍–‍70 kg
World Juniors Championships
Gold medal – first place	1996 Porto	‍–‍66 kg
Bronze medal – third place	1998 Cali	‍–‍70 kg
European Junior Championships
Gold medal – first place	1996 Monte Carlo	‍–‍66 kg
Gold medal – first place	1997 Ljubljana	‍–‍66 kg
Gold medal – first place	1999 Rome	‍–‍70 kg
Bronze medal – third place	1998 Bucharest	‍–‍70 kg
Summer Universiade
Bronze medal – third place	2001 Beijing	‍–‍70 kg

Profile at external databases
- IJF: 248
- JudoInside.com: 10
- Updated on 28 May 2023

Edith Bosch (born 31 May 1980) is a Dutch judoka.

Her Olympic debut was at the 2000 Olympics in Sydney where she finished seventh. She won the silver medal at the 2004 Summer Olympics in the middleweight division. She was also European champion that year. Bosch became world champion in the same ‍–‍70 kg category at the 2005 World Judo Championships in Cairo, Egypt. At the 2008 Summer Olympics, she defeated Ronda Rousey in a quarter final match and won a bronze medal. In the 2012 Summer Olympics in London, she once again won the bronze medal.

Bosch has a HEAO (Dutch: Hoger economisch en administratief onderwijs) diploma in commercial economy from Randstad Topsport Academy, she is also a master in Sport Management from Johan Cruyff Institute, and currently works as a team manager for the Nederlandse Spoorwegen.

During the 2012 Summer Olympics, Bosch was watching the final of the Men's 100 metres when a man threw a plastic bottle onto the track. Bosch punched the man, and he was detained by stewards.

Bosch retired from competitive judo in April 2013. She subsequently took up CrossFit.

In 2013, she appeared on Dutch reality TV programme Expeditie Robinson 2013, which she won. She lost 16 kilograms (35 lb) over the programme's month of production.
