= Lucie Décosse =

French judoka (born 1981)

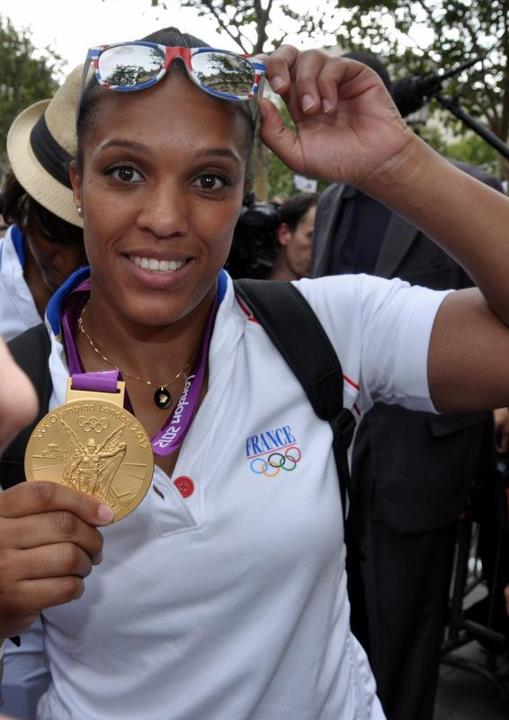
- Lucie Décosse during the French medal winners' parade 2012 Summer Olympics

Personal information
- Born: 6 August 1981 (age 44)
- Occupation: Judoka

Sport
- Country: France
- Sport: Judo
- Weight class: –63 kg, –70 kg
- Rank: 6th dan black belt

Achievements and titles
- Olympic Games: (gold) (2012)
- World Champ.: (2005, 2010, 2011)
- European Champ.: (gold) (2002, 2007, 2008, 2009)
Medal record
Women's judo
Representing France
Olympic Games
Gold medal – first place	2012 London	‍–‍70 kg
Silver medal – second place	2008 Beijing	‍–‍63 kg
World Championships
Gold medal – first place	2005 Cairo	‍–‍63 kg
Gold medal – first place	2010 Tokyo	‍–‍70 kg
Gold medal – first place	2011 Paris	‍–‍70 kg
Silver medal – second place	2007 Rio de Janeiro	‍–‍63 kg
European Championships
Gold medal – first place	2002 Maribor	‍–‍63 kg
Gold medal – first place	2007 Belgrade	‍–‍63 kg
Gold medal – first place	2008 Lisbon	‍–‍63 kg
Gold medal – first place	2009 Tbilisi	‍–‍70 kg
Silver medal – second place	2006 Tampere	‍–‍63 kg
Bronze medal – third place	2005 Rotterdam	‍–‍63 kg
Bronze medal – third place	2011 Istanbul	‍–‍70 kg
World Masters
Gold medal – first place	2011 Baku	‍–‍70 kg
Gold medal – first place	2012 Almaty	‍–‍70 kg
Bronze medal – third place	2010 Suwon	‍–‍70 kg
Bronze medal – third place	2013 Tyumen	‍–‍70 kg
IJF Grand Slam
Gold medal – first place	2008 Tokyo	‍–‍70 kg
Gold medal – first place	2009 Paris	‍–‍70 kg
Gold medal – first place	2009 Rio de Janeiro	‍–‍70 kg
Gold medal – first place	2010 Paris	‍–‍70 kg
Gold medal – first place	2010 Rio de Janeiro	‍–‍70 kg
Gold medal – first place	2011 Paris	‍–‍70 kg
Silver medal – second place	2012 Paris	‍–‍70 kg
Bronze medal – third place	2013 Paris	‍–‍70 kg
World Juniors Championships
Gold medal – first place	2000 Nabeul	‍–‍63 kg

Profile at external databases
- IJF: 419
- JudoInside.com: 351
- Updated on 28 May 2023

Lucie Décosse (born 6 August 1981 in Chaumont) is a female French retired judoka.

== Career ==
Décosse competed in the half-middleweight (57–63 kg) category until 2008. Thereafter, she switched to the middleweight (63–70 kg) category. She was ranked number one in the world in both categories.

Décosse won a total of 13 medals (8 of them gold) at the Olympic Games, the World Judo Championships and the European Judo Championships. She won the most important medal of her career – the middleweight (63–70 kg) gold medal – at the 2012 Olympic Games.

Décosse retired from judo after losing her bronze medal match against South Korea's Kim Seong-Yeon at the 2013 World Judo Championships in Rio de Janeiro.
