= Anett Mészáros =

Hungarian judoka (born 1987)

Personal information
- Full name: Anett Mészáros
- Nationality: Hungarian
- Born: 14 July 1987 (age 38) Budapest, Hungary
- Occupation: Judoka
- Height: 1.78 m (5 ft 10 in)

Sport
- Country: Hungary
- Sport: Judo
- Weight class: ‍–‍70 kg
- Club: Budapest Honvéd
- Coached by: Péter Toncs

Achievements and titles
- Olympic Games: 7th (2008)
- World Champ.: (silver) (2009, 2010)
- European Champ.: (gold) (2010)
Medal record
Women's judo
Representing Hungary
World Championships
Silver medal – second place	2009 Rotterdam	‍–‍70 kg
Silver medal – second place	2010 Tokyo	‍–‍70 kg
Bronze medal – third place	2007 Rio de Janeiro	‍–‍70 kg
Bronze medal – third place	2011 Paris	‍–‍70 kg
European Championships
Gold medal – first place	2010 Vienna	‍–‍70 kg
Bronze medal – third place	2005 Rotterdam	‍–‍70 kg
World Masters
Bronze medal – third place	2010 Suwon	‍–‍70 kg
IJF Grand Slam
Gold medal – first place	2010 Moscow	‍–‍70 kg
Silver medal – second place	2009 Tokyo	‍–‍70 kg
Silver medal – second place	2010 Paris	‍–‍70 kg
IJF Grand Prix
Gold medal – first place	2009 Abu Dhabi	‍–‍70 kg
Silver medal – second place	2009 Tunis	‍–‍70 kg
Silver medal – second place	2011 Baku	‍–‍70 kg
Bronze medal – third place	2015 Budapest	‍–‍70 kg
European U23 Championships
Silver medal – second place	2006 Moscow	‍–‍70 kg
Bronze medal – third place	2005 Kyiv	‍–‍70 kg
Bronze medal – third place	2008 Zagreb	‍–‍70 kg
World Juniors Championships
Gold medal – first place	2004 Budapest	‍–‍70 kg
Silver medal – second place	2006 Santo Domingo	‍–‍70 kg
European Junior Championships
Gold medal – first place	2004 Sofia	‍–‍70 kg
Gold medal – first place	2006 Tallinn	‍–‍70 kg
Silver medal – second place	2003 Sarajevo	‍–‍70 kg
European Cadet Championships
Gold medal – first place	2003 Baku	‍–‍70 kg
Bronze medal – third place	2002 Győr	‍–‍63 kg

Profile at external databases
- IJF: 249
- JudoInside.com: 25460
- Updated on 17 July 2023

Anett Mészáros (born 14 July 1987 in Budapest) is a judoka from Hungary.

Mészáros claimed gold at the 2010 European Judo Championships in Vienna.
