= Haruka Tachimoto =

Japanese judoka (born 1990)

Personal information
- Born: 3 August 1990 (age 35)
- Occupation: Judoka

Sport
- Country: Japan
- Sport: Judo
- Weight class: –70 kg

Achievements and titles
- Olympic Games: (gold) (2016)
- World Champ.: R16 (2011)
- Asian Champ.: (silver) (2011)
Medal record
Women's judo
Representing Japan
Olympic Games
Gold medal – first place	2016 Rio de Janeiro	‍–‍70 kg
World Championships
Bronze medal – third place	2014 Chelyabinsk	Women's team
Asian Championships
Silver medal – second place	2011 Abu Dhabi	‍–‍70 kg
World Masters
Bronze medal – third place	2012 Almaty	‍–‍70 kg
IJF Grand Slam
Gold medal – first place	2010 Tokyo	‍–‍70 kg
Gold medal – first place	2012 Paris	‍–‍70 kg
Gold medal – first place	2015 Tyumen	‍–‍70 kg
Gold medal – first place	2015 Paris	‍–‍70 kg
Silver medal – second place	2011 Moscow	‍–‍70 kg
Silver medal – second place	2012 Tokyo	‍–‍70 kg
Silver medal – second place	2014 Tokyo	‍–‍70 kg
Silver medal – second place	2016 Paris	‍–‍70 kg
Bronze medal – third place	2011 Tokyo	‍–‍70 kg
Bronze medal – third place	2014 Paris	‍–‍70 kg
IJF Grand Prix
Gold medal – first place	2010 Tunis	‍–‍70 kg
Gold medal – first place	2010 Rotterdam	‍–‍70 kg
Gold medal – first place	2011 Abu Dhabi	‍–‍70 kg
Bronze medal – third place	2013 Miami	‍–‍70 kg
World Juniors Championships
Gold medal – first place	2008 Bangkok	‍–‍70 kg
Gold medal – first place	2009 Paris	‍–‍70 kg
Asian Junior Championships
Gold medal – first place	2007 Hyderabad	‍–‍70 kg

Profile at external databases
- IJF: 1351
- JudoInside.com: 44567
- Updated on 24 May 2023

Haruka Tachimoto (田知本 遥, Tachimoto Haruka; born 3 August 1990 in Imizu, Japan) is a Japanese judoka ranking at 5th Dan. She competed in the -70 kg division at the 2016 Olympics in Rio; she took gold, beating the world #1 and world #2 ranked women along the way. She had previously competed in the 70 kg event at the 2012 Summer Olympics.
