= Erica Barbieri =

Italian judoka (born 1981)

Personal information
- Born: 2 March 1981 (age 45)
- Occupation: Judoka

Sport
- Country: Italy
- Sport: Judo
- Weight class: ‍–‍70 kg

Achievements and titles
- Olympic Games: R32 (2012)
- World Champ.: 5th (2009)
- European Champ.: (bronze) (2011)
Medal record
Women's judo
Representing Italy
European Championships
Bronze medal – third place	2011 Istanbul	‍–‍70 kg
IJF Grand Prix
Silver medal – second place	2010 Rotterdam	‍–‍70 kg
Bronze medal – third place	2011 Qingdao	‍–‍70 kg
Summer Universiade
Bronze medal – third place	2007 Bangkok	‍–‍70 kg
Mediterranean Games
Bronze medal – third place	2009 Pescara	‍–‍70 kg

Profile at external databases
- IJF: 694
- JudoInside.com: 11186
- Updated on 15 November 2022

Erica Barbieri (born 2 March 1981 in La Spezia) is an Italian judoka. She competed in the 70 kg event at the 2012 Summer Olympics and lost in the first round to Hwang Ye-Sul.
