= Judo Grand Slam in Brazil =

International Judo tournament in Brazil

Locations of the Grand Slam Tournaments.

The Grand Slam tournament in Brazil is a judo tournament that was held in Rio de Janeiro from 2009 to 2012. After seven years, a Grand Slam tournament took place in Brasília in 2019.

The Russian Alim Gadanov, the French Lucie Décosse and the Dutch Elco van der Geest won in 2009 and 2010. After that, only one judoka managed to win a second title: the Russian Musa Mogushkov won in Rio de Janeiro in 2011 and in Brasília in 2019.

== Grand Slam 2009 ==
The first Grand Slam tournament in Brazil took place on July 4th and 5th, 2009 in Rio de Janeiro. The only Brazilian winner was Daniel Hernandes in the heavyweight division.

Weight class	Men	Women
Extra-lightweight	Ludwig Paischer	Frédérique Jossinet
Half-lightweight	Alim Gadanow	Yuka Nishida
Lightweight	Dirk Van Tichelt	Telma Monteiro
Half-middleweight	Iwan Nifontow	Claudia Malzahn
Middleweight	Kirill Denissow	Lucie Décosse
Half-heavyweight	Elco van der Geest	Céline Lebrun
Heavyweight	Daniel Hernandes	Mika Sugimoto

== Grand Slam 2010 ==
The second Grand Slam tournament in Brazil took place in Rio de Janeiro on May 22nd and 23rd, 2010. The only Brazilian winner was Hugo Pessanha in the middleweight division.

Weight class	Men	Women
Extra-lightweight	Hiroaki Hiraoka	Tomoko Fukumi
Half-lightweight	Alim Gadanow	Misato Nakamura
Lightweight	Hiroyuki Akimoto	Kaori Matsumoto
Half-middleweight	Tomislav Marijanović	Yoshie Ueno
Middleweight	Hugo Pessanha	Lucie Décosse
Half-heavyweight	Elco van der Geest	Ruika Satō
Heavyweight	Kazuhiko Takahashi	Lucija Polavder

== Grand Slam 2011 ==
The third Grand Slam tournament in Brazil took place on June 18 and 19, 2011 in Rio de Janeiro. Four Brazilian judokas won: Érika Miranda, Leandro Guilheiro, Mayra Aguiar and João Schlittler.

Weight class	Men	Women
Extra-lightweight	Hirofumi Yamamoto	Haruna Asami
Half-lightweight	Musa Moguschkow	Érika Miranda
Lightweight	Riki Nakaya	Corina Stefan
Half-middleweight	Leandro Guilheiro	Kana Abe
Middleweight	Takashi Ono	Yoriko Kunihara
Half-heavyweight	Takamasa Anai	Mayra Aguiar
Heavyweight	João Schlittler	Megumi Tachimoto

== Grand Slam 2012 ==
The fourth Grand Slam tournament in Brazil took place in Rio de Janeiro on June 9th and 10th, 2012. Five Brazilian judokas won: Eleudis Valentim, Marcelo Contini, Victor Penalber, Mariana Barros and Nadia Merli. After Japanese judokas had won eight times in 2010 and 2011, this time there were no Japanese judokas.

Weight class	Men	Women
Extra-lightweight	Bekir Ozlu	Paula Pareto
Half-lightweight	Denis Lawrentiew	Eleudis Valentim
Lightweight	Marcelo Contini	Jovana Rogić
Half-middleweight	Victor Penalber	Mariana Barros
Middleweight	Warlam Liparteliani	Nadia Merli
Half-heavyweight	Irakli Zirekidse	Kayla Harrison
Heavyweight	Adam Okruaschwili	Vanessa Martina Zambotti

== Grand Slam 2019 ==
After a seven-year break, a Grand Slam tournament took place in Brazil again in 2019. This was held in Brasília from October 6th to 8th. Four Brazilian judokas won: Allan Kuwabara, Daniel Cargnin, Ketleyn Quadros and Beatriz Souza.

Weight class	Men	Women
Extra-lightweight	Allan Kuwabara	Catarina Costa
Half-lightweight	Daniel Cargnin	Odette Giuffrida
Half-middleweight	Musa Moguschkow	Nekoda Smythe-Davis
Halbmittelgewicht	Takanori Nagase	Ketleyn Quadros
Middleweight	Nikoloz Sherazadishvili	Yuri Alvear
Half-heavyweight	Kentaro Iida	Kaliema Antomarchi
Heavyweight	Teddy Riner	Beatriz Souza
