= Nugzar Tatalashvili =

Georgian judoka (born 1990)

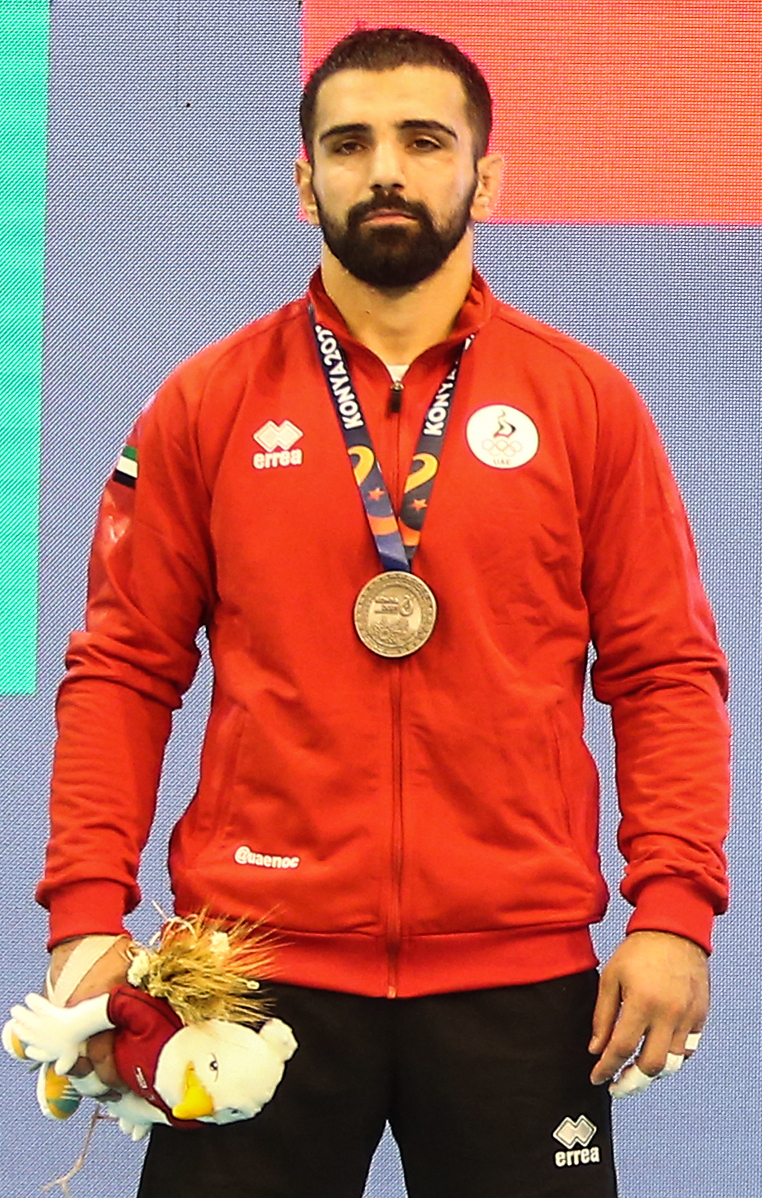
- Tatalashvili in 2022

Personal information
- Nationality: Georgian
- Born: 20 March 1990 (age 36)
- Occupation: Judoka

Sport
- Country: Georgia (until 2021); United Arab Emirates (since 2022)
- Sport: Judo
- Weight class: ‍–‍73 kg, ‍–‍81 kg

Achievements and titles
- Olympic Games: R32 (2024)
- World Champ.: 5th (2025)
- Regional finals: (silver) (2013, 2015); (silver) (2024)
Medal record
Men's judo
Representing United Arab Emirates
Asian Championships
Silver medal – second place	2024 Hong Kong	‍–‍81 kg
Bronze medal – third place	2022 Nur‑Sultan	‍–‍81 kg
IJF Grand Slam
Silver medal – second place	2025 Paris	‍–‍81 kg
Bronze medal – third place	2022 Budapest	‍–‍81 kg
Bronze medal – third place	2023 Abu Dhabi	‍–‍81 kg
Bronze medal – third place	2024 Tbilisi	‍–‍81 kg
Islamic Solidarity Games
Silver medal – second place	2021 Konya	‍–‍81 kg
Representing Georgia
World Championships
Gold medal – first place	2013 Rio de Janeiro	Men's team
Bronze medal – third place	2012 Salvador	Men's team
Bronze medal – third place	2015 Astana	Men's team
European Games
Silver medal – second place	2015 Baku	‍–‍73 kg
Silver medal – second place	2015 Baku	Men's team
European Championships
Gold medal – first place	2012 Chelyabinsk	Men's team
Gold medal – first place	2013 Budapest	Men's team
Gold medal – first place	2014 Montpellier	Men's team
Gold medal – first place	2016 Kazan	Men's team
Silver medal – second place	2013 Budapest	‍–‍73 kg
Bronze medal – third place	2011 Istanbul	Men's team
Bronze medal – third place	2016 Kazan	‍–‍73 kg
World Masters
Silver medal – second place	2015 Rabat	‍–‍73 kg
IJF Grand Slam
Bronze medal – third place	2015 Tokyo	‍–‍73 kg
Bronze medal – third place	2018 Paris	‍–‍81 kg
Bronze medal – third place	2021 Tel Aviv	‍–‍73 kg
Bronze medal – third place	2021 Kazan	‍–‍73 kg
IJF Grand Prix
Gold medal – first place	2014 Tbilisi	‍–‍73 kg
Gold medal – first place	2014 Ulaanbaatar	‍–‍73 kg
Gold medal – first place	2016 Tbilisi	‍–‍73 kg
Silver medal – second place	2015 Düsseldorf	‍–‍73 kg
Bronze medal – third place	2014 Havana	‍–‍73 kg
Bronze medal – third place	2015 Tbilisi	‍–‍73 kg
Bronze medal – third place	2016 Almaty	‍–‍73 kg
Bronze medal – third place	2018 Tbilisi	‍–‍81 kg
European Junior Championships
Bronze medal – third place	2009 Yerevan	‍–‍73 kg

Profile at external databases
- IJF: 2404, 67723
- JudoInside.com: 58143
- Updated on 17 June 2025

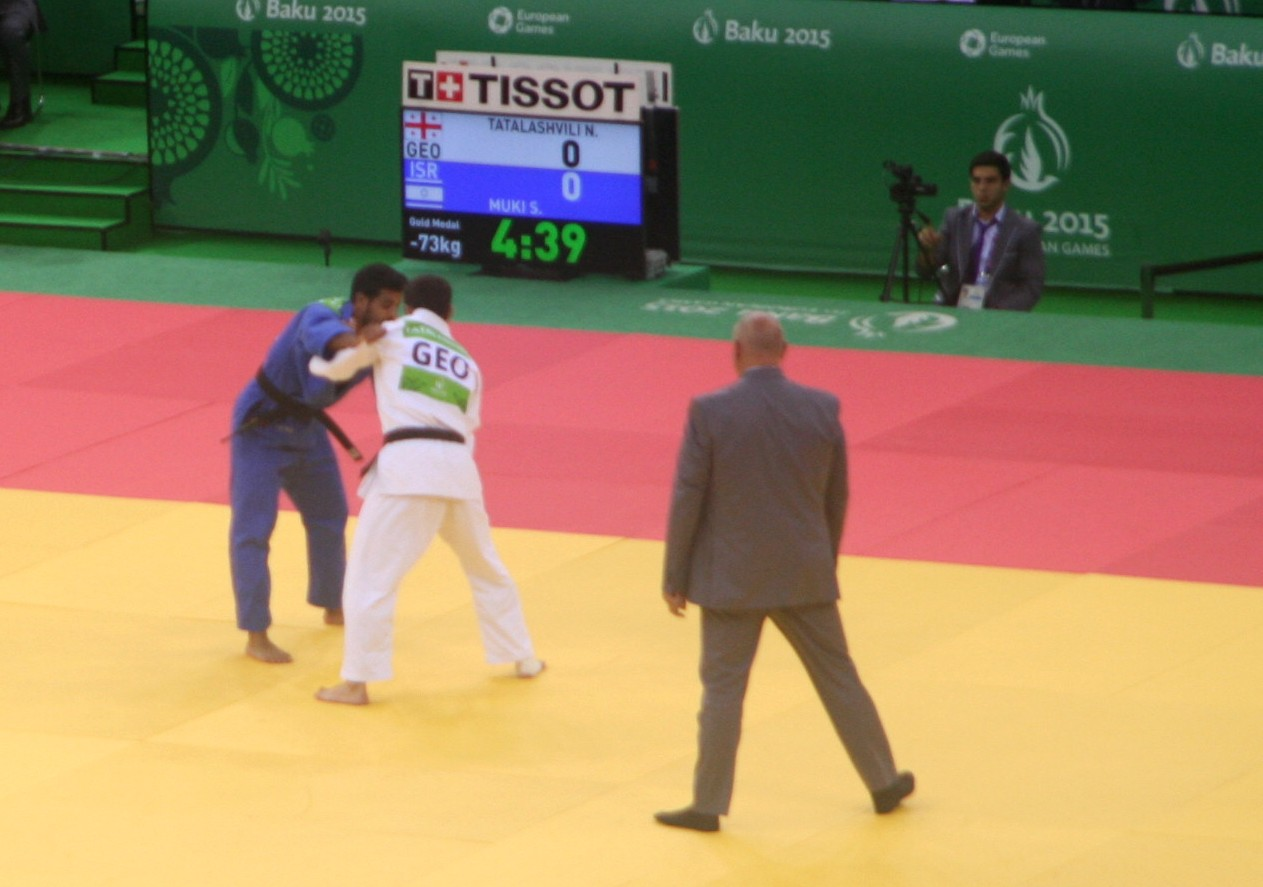
Tatalashvili vs Sagi Muki (Israel) at the gold final of the 2015 European Games

Nugzar Tatalashvili (Georgian: ნუგზარ ტატალაშვილი; born 20 March 1990 in Gori, Georgian SSR, Soviet Union) is a Georgian-Emirati judoka. He competed in the men's 73 kg event at the 2012 Summer Olympics and was eliminated by Wang Ki-Chun in the first round. Tatalashvili won silver Medal in 2013 European Judo Championships.

On 26 June 2015, representing Georgia at the 2015 European Games in the under 73 kg category, he won a silver medal. He lost in the final to Sagi Muki of Israel. He is also competing in the 2024 Olympics.
