= Zebeda Rekhviashvili =

Georgian judoka

Temur Nozadze
Personal information
- Nationality: Georgian
- Born: 23 January 1998 (age 28)
- Occupation: Judoka

Sport
- Country: Georgia (2011–19); Serbia (2021–present)
- Sport: Judo
- Weight class: –73 kg, –81 kg

Achievements and titles
- World Champ.: R16 (2013, 2017)
- European Champ.: (bronze) (2013)
Medal record
Men's judo
Representing Georgia
World Championships
Gold medal – first place	2013 Rio de Janeiro	Men's team
Bronze medal – third place	2012 Salvador	Men's team
European Championships
Gold medal – first place	2012 Chelyabinsk	Men's team
Gold medal – first place	2013 Budapest	Men's team
Gold medal – first place	2014 Montpellier	Men's team
Gold medal – first place	2017 Warsaw	Men's team
Bronze medal – third place	2013 Budapest	–73 kg
IJF Grand Slam
Silver medal – second place	2017 Paris	–81 kg
Bronze medal – third place	2013 Moscow	–73 kg
Bronze medal – third place	2017 Ekaterinburg	–81 kg
Bronze medal – third place	2018 Ekaterinburg	–81 kg
IJF Grand Prix
Bronze medal – third place	2012 Baku	–73 kg
Bronze medal – third place	2013 Samsun	–73 kg
Bronze medal – third place	2014 Tbilisi	–73 kg
Bronze medal – third place	2014 Budapest	–73 kg
World Juniors Championships
Bronze medal – third place	2010 Agadir	–73 kg
European Cadet Championships
Gold medal – first place	2007 Valletta	–66 kg

Profile at external databases
- IJF: 3731, 63169
- JudoInside.com: 42914
- Updated on 14 November 2022

Zebeda Rekhviashvili (Georgian: ზებედა რეხვიაშვილი; Serbian: Зебеда Рехвијашвили; born February 16, 1991, in Georgian) is a Georgian born Serbian judoka. He won a Bronze Medal at the 2013 European Judo Championships.
