= Vadym Synyavsky =

Ukrainian judoka (born 1987)

Personal information
- Born: 2 December 1987 (age 38) Zaporizhzhia Oblast
- Occupation: Judoka

Sport
- Country: Ukraine
- Sport: Judo
- Weight class: ‍–‍90 kg

Achievements and titles
- World Champ.: R16 (2011)
- European Champ.: 7th (2009)
Medal record
Men's judo
Representing Ukraine
European Games
| Bronze medal – third place | 2015 Baku | Men's team |
European Championships
| Bronze medal – third place | 2012 Chelyabinsk | Men's team |
| Bronze medal – third place | 2017 Warsaw | Men's team |
IJF Grand Prix
| Bronze medal – third place | 2009 Hamburg | ‍–‍90 kg |
| Bronze medal – third place | 2011 Düsseldorf | ‍–‍90 kg |
| Bronze medal – third place | 2014 Tbilisi | ‍–‍90 kg |
European Junior Championships
| Silver medal – second place | 2006 Tallinn | ‍–‍90 kg |

Profile at external databases
- IJF: 2010
- JudoInside.com: 32353
- Updated on 22 July 2022

Vadym Synyavsky (Ukrainian: Вадим Синявський; born 2 December 1987 in Zaporizhzhia Oblast) is a male Ukrainian former judoka. He is a bronze medalist of the 2015 European Games in the judo men's team event and a bronze medalist of both the 2012 and 2017 European Championships in the team events as well. In the individual competition at the 2015 European Games, Synyavsky lost in the round of 32 to Nikoloz Sherazadishvili from Spain.

Synyavsky competed at three World Championships. In 2011 in Paris, he defeated Mark Anthony from Australia and Chingiz Mamedov from Kyrgyzstan, but lost to Kirill Denisov from Russia in the round of 16. In 2014 in Chelyabinsk, he lost to Mashu Baker from Japan in the round of 64. In 2015 in Astana, he defeated Thomas Briceño from Chile, but lost to the eventual World champion Gwak Dong-han from South Korea in the round of 32. He was also 7th at the 2009 European Championships.

Synyavsky had several successes in several Grand Prix competitions. He was third at the 2009 Judo Grand Prix Hamburg, 2011 Judo Grand Prix Düsseldorf and 2014 Judo Grand Prix Tbilisi.
