= Adam Okruashvili =

Georgian judoka (born 1989)

Personal information
- Nationality: Georgian
- Born: 1 January 1989 (age 37)
- Occupation: Judoka

Sport
- Country: Georgia
- Sport: Judo
- Weight class: +100 kg

Achievements and titles
- Olympic Games: R32 (2012, 2016)
- World Champ.: (bronze) (2015)
- European Champ.: (gold) (2015)
Medal record
Men's judo
Representing Georgia
World Championships
Gold medal – first place	2013 Rio de Janeiro	Men's team
Bronze medal – third place	2014 Chelyabinsk	Men's team
Bronze medal – third place	2015 Astana	+100 kg
Bronze medal – third place	2015 Astana	Men's team
European Games
Gold medal – first place	2015 Baku	+100 kg
Silver medal – second place	2015 Baku	Men's team
European Championships
Gold medal – first place	2012 Chelyabinsk	Men's team
Gold medal – first place	2013 Budapest	Men's team
Gold medal – first place	2014 Montpellier	Men's team
Gold medal – first place	2016 Kazan	Men's team
Gold medal – first place	2017 Warsaw	Men's team
Silver medal – second place	2013 Budapest	+100 kg
Silver medal – second place	2014 Montpellier	+100 kg
Silver medal – second place	2017 Warsaw	+100 kg
Bronze medal – third place	2006 Novi Sad	Open
World Masters
Gold medal – first place	2013 Tyumen	+100 kg
IJF Grand Slam
Gold medal – first place	2012 Rio de Janeiro	+100 kg
IJF Grand Prix
Gold medal – first place	2014 Tbilisi	+100 kg
Gold medal – first place	2014 Budapest	+100 kg
Gold medal – first place	2016 Almaty	+100 kg
Gold medal – first place	2017 Tbilisi	+100 kg
Silver medal – second place	2012 Düsseldorf	+100 kg
Silver medal – second place	2013 Düsseldorf	+100 kg
Silver medal – second place	2014 Samsun	+100 kg
Silver medal – second place	2014 Ulaanbaatar	+100 kg
Silver medal – second place	2015 Tbilisi	+100 kg
Bronze medal – third place	2014 Düsseldorf	+100 kg
Bronze medal – third place	2016 Samsun	+100 kg
Bronze medal – third place	2018 Budapest	+100 kg
European Junior Championships
Bronze medal – third place	2005 Zagreb	+100 kg
European Cadet Championships
Silver medal – second place	2004 Rotterdam	+90 kg
Summer Universiade
Bronze medal – third place	2007 Bangkok	Open

Profile at external databases
- IJF: 2137
- JudoInside.com: 33875
- Updated on 3 July 2023

Adam Okruashvili (Georgian: ადამ ოქრუაშვილი; born 1 January 1989 in Tbilisi, Georgian SSR, Soviet Union) is a Georgian judoka.

He competed at the 2012 Summer Olympics and the 2016 Olympics in the +100 kg event. Okruashvili won silver in 2013 European Judo Championships and 2014 European Judo Championships.

He won the gold medal in the 2015 European Games, defeating Israeli Or Sasson in the +100 kg category final.
