= 2011 World Judo Championships – Men's 90 kg =

Judo competition

Judo Men's 90 kg at the 2011 World Judo Championships
- Venue: Accor Arena
- Location: Paris, France
- Date: 26 August 2011
- Competitors: 69 from 52 nations

Medalists
gold medal	Ilias Iliadis (2nd title)	Greece
silver medal	Daiki Nishiyama	Japan
bronze medal	Takashi Ono	Japan
bronze medal	Asley Gonzalez	Cuba

Competition at external databases
- Links: IJF • JudoInside

The men's 90 kg competition of the 2011 World Judo Championships was held on August 26.

== Medalists ==
Gold	Silver	Bronze
Ilias Iliadis (GRE)	Daiki Nishiyama (JPN)	Takashi Ono (JPN); Asley Gonzalez (CUB)

== Results ==
=== Pool A ===
First round fights

	Score	
Ciril Grossklaus (Switzerland)	001–002	(Venezuela) Jose Camacho

Second Round
(Greece) Ilias Iliadis	001
(Poland) Robert Krawczyk	000
(Venezuela) Jose Camacho	000
(Algeria) Lyès Bouyacoub	103
(United Kingdom) Winston Gordon	102
(Panama) Rene de Urriola	000
(Moldova) Ivan Remarenco	101
(Paraguay) Martin Sitjar	000
(Brazil) Hugo Pessanha	001
(Latvia) Aigars Milenbergs	000
(Mongolia) Janchivdorj Bunddorj	000
(Kazakhstan) Alexandr Kassachev	100
(Chinese Taipei) Tseng Han-Chieh	000
(Serbia) Nikola Nikolić	100
(Austria) Max Schirnhofer	001
(Cameroon) Dieudonne Dolassem	102

Quarterfinals
(Greece) Ilias Iliadis	100
(Algeria) Lyès Bouyacoub	000
(United Kingdom) Winston Gordon	000
(Moldova) Ivan Remarenco	100
(Brazil) Hugo Pessanha	002
(Kazakhstan) Alexandr Kassachev	000
(Serbia) Nikola Nikolić	001
(Cameroon) Dieudonne Dolassem	010

Semifinals
(Greece) Ilias Iliadis	100
(Moldova) Ivan Remarenco	000
(Brazil) Hugo Pessanha	100
(Cameroon) Dieudonne Dolassem	000

Final
(Greece) Ilias Iliadis	110
(Brazil) Hugo Pessanha	000

=== Pool B ===
First round fights

	Score	
Mark Anthony (Australia)	000–100	(Spain) David Alarza
Diego Rosati (Argentina)	000–100	(South Korea) Lee Kyu-Won

Second Round
(Russia) Kirill Denisov	100
(United States) Jacob Larsen	000
(Mexico) Isao Cardenas	000
(France) Romain Buffet	101
(Kyrgyzstan) Chingiz Mamedov	100
(India) Yashpal Solanki	000
(Ukraine) Vadym Synyavsky	002
(Australia) Mark Anthony	000
(Azerbaijan) Elkhan Mammadov	111
(Uzbekistan) Khurshid Nabiev	000
(Canada) Alexandre Emond	101
(China) Zheng Jizhao	000
(Sweden) Joakim Dvarby	000
(Georgia (country)) Zviad Gogotchuri	011
(South Korea) Lee Kyu-Won	100
(Palestine) Khader Kamleh	000

Quarterfinals
(Russia) Kirill Denisov	010
(France) Romain Buffet	000
(Kyrgyzstan) Chingiz Mamedov	000
(Ukraine) Vadym Synyavsky	002
(Azerbaijan) Elkhan Mammadov	001
(Canada) Alexandre Emond	000
(Georgia (country)) Zviad Gogotchuri	000
(South Korea) Lee Kyu-Won	101

Semifinals
(Russia) Kirill Denisov	011
(Ukraine) Vadym Synyavsky	000
(Azerbaijan) Elkhan Mammadov	000
(South Korea) Lee Kyu-Won	101

Final
(Russia) Kirill Denisov	100
(South Korea) Lee Kyu-Won	000

=== Pool C ===
First round fights

	Score	
Mohammed Afana (Qatar)	000–100	(Switzerland) Dominique Hischier
Tiago Camilo (Brazil)	100–000	(Germany) Aaron Hildebrand

Second Round
(Japan) Takashi Ono	001
(France) Yves-Matthieu Dafreville	000
(Sweden) Marcus Nyman	100
(Uruguay) Juan Romero	000
(Kenya) Evans Kengara	000
(Slovakia) Milan Randl	100
(Russia) Kamil Magomedov	000
(Switzerland) Dominique Hischier	001
(Brazil) Tiago Camilo	100
(Senegal) Tabane Paye	000
(South Africa) Patrick Trezise	000
(South Korea) Song Dae-Nam	100
(Morocco) Mohamed El Assri	000
(Egypt) Hesham Mesbah	010
(Estonia) Grigori Minaskin	010
(Ukraine) Valentyn Grekov	100

Quarterfinals
(Japan) Takashi Ono	010
(Sweden) Marcus Nyman	^000
(Slovakia) Milan Randl	100
(Switzerland) Dominique Hischier	001
(Brazil) Tiago Camilo	001
(South Korea) Song Dae-Nam	000
(Egypt) Hesham Mesbah	000
(Ukraine) Valentyn Grekov	001

Semifinals
(Japan) Takashi Ono	011
(Slovakia) Milan Randl	000
(Brazil) Tiago Camilo	001
(Ukraine) Valentyn Grekov	010

Final
(Japan) Takashi Ono	101
(Ukraine) Valentyn Grekov	000

=== Pool D ===
First round fights

	Score	
Aaron Cohen (United States)	000–100	(Argentina) Hector Campos
Dilshod Choriev (Uzbekistan)	100–001	(Serbia) Dmitrij Gerasimenko

Second Round
(Japan) Daiki Nishiyama	001
(Georgia (country)) Varlam Liparteliani	000
(Lithuania) Karolis Bauža	100
(Kazakhstan) Timur Bolat	000
(Argentina) Hector Campos	000
(Algeria) Amar Benikhlef	001
(Italy) Roberto Meloni	002
(Ivory Coast) Kinapeya Romeo Kone	000
(Uzbekistan) Dilshod Choriev	100
(New Zealand) Ryan Dill-Russell	000
(Mongolia) Erdenebilegiin Enkhbat	000
(Poland) Krzysztof Węglarz	100

Quarterfinals
(Japan) Daiki Nishiyama	001
(Lithuania) Karolis Bauža	000
(Algeria) Amar Benikhlef	010
(Italy) Roberto Meloni	001
(Uzbekistan) Dilshod Choriev	100
(Tajikistan) Parviz Sobirov	000
(Cuba) Asley Gonzalez	001
(Poland) Krzysztof Węglarz	000

Semifinals
(Japan) Daiki Nishiyama	100
(Algeria) Amar Benikhlef	000
(Uzbekistan) Dilshod Choriev	000
(Cuba) Asley Gonzalez	001

Final
(Japan) Daiki Nishiyama	001
(Cuba) Asley Gonzalez	000

=== Repechage ===
Repechage		Third place
(Brazil) Hugo Pessanha	000
(South Korea) Lee Kyu-Won	101	(South Korea) Lee Kyu-Won	011
		(Japan) Takashi Ono	100

Repechage		Third place
(Ukraine) Valentyn Grekov	001
(Cuba) Asley Gonzalez	010	(Cuba) Asley Gonzalez	001
		(Russia) Kirill Denisov	000

=== Finals ===
Semi-finals
(Greece) Ilias Iliadis	100
(Russia) Kirill Denisov	000
(Japan) Takashi Ono	000
(Japan) Daiki Nishiyama	001

Final
(Greece) Ilias Iliadis	100
(Japan) Daiki Nishiyama	000
