= 2017 European Judo Championships – Men's team =

Judo Men's team at the 2017 European Judo Championships
- Venue: Torwar Hall
- Location: Warsaw, Poland
- Date: April 23, 2017
- Competitors: 96 from 16 nations

Medalists
| gold medal | Georgia (9th title) |
| silver medal | Russia |
| bronze medal | Hungary |
| bronze medal | Ukraine |

Competition at external databases
- Links: IJF • JudoInside

The men's team competition at the 2017 European Judo Championships in Warsaw was held on 23 April at the Torwar Hall.

Each team consisted of five judokas from the –66, 73, 81, 90 and +90 kg categories.

== Teams ==
| Austria | Azerbaijan | Czech Republic | France |
|---|---|---|---|
| 66 kg: Andreas Tiefgraber; 73 kg: Christopher Wagner; 81 kg: Lukas Reiter; 90 kg: Johannes Pacher +90 kg: Stephan Hegyi | 66 kg: Nijat Shikhalizade; 73 kg: Hidayat Heydarov; 81 kg: Rufat Ismayilov; Rustam Orujov; 90 kg: Tural Safguliyev; Mammadali Mehdiyev +90 kg: Ushangi Kokauri; Elkhan Mammadov | 66 kg: David Pulkrabek; 73 kg: Jakub Ječmínek; 81 kg: Ivan Petr; 90 kg: David Klammert +90 kg: Tomáš Knápek | 66 kg: Alexandre Mariac; 73 kg: Guillaume Chaine; Loïc Korval; 81 kg: Pape Doudou Ndiaye; 90 kg: Axel Clerget +90 kg: Cyrille Maret |
| Germany | Georgia | Hungary | Italy |
| 66 kg: Manuel Scheibel; 73 kg: Anthony Zingg; 81 kg: Benjamin Münnich; 90 kg: Eduard Trippel +90 kg: Stephan Hegyi | 66 kg: Lasha Giunashvili; Vazha Margvelashvili; 73 kg: Lasha Shavdatuashvili; Phridon Gigani; 81 kg: Zebeda Rekhviashvili; 90 kg: Beka Gviniashvili; Ushangi Margiani +90 kg: Guram Tushishvili; Adam Okruashvili | 66 kg: Ákos Bartha; 73 kg: Frigyes Szabó; 81 kg: László Csoknyai; 90 kg: Gábor Vér +90 kg: Barna Bor; Miklós Cirjenics | 66 kg: Matteo Medves; 73 kg: Leonardo Casaglia; 81 kg: Antonio Esposito; 90 kg: Matteo Marconcini +90 kg: Vincenzo D'Arco |
| Montenegro | Netherlands | Poland | Romania |
| 66 kg: Jusuf Nurković; 73 kg: Nikola Gusić; 81 kg: Arso Milić; 90 kg: Marko Bubanja +90 kg: Danilo Pantić | 66 kg: Matthijs van Harten; 73 kg: Sam van 't Westende; 81 kg: Frank de Wit; 90 kg: Noël van 't End +90 kg: Roy Meyer; Michael Korrel | 66 kg: Patryk Wawrzyczek; 73 kg: Mateusz Garbacz; 81 kg: Jakub Kubieniec; 90 kg: Piotr Kuczera +90 kg: Kamil Grabowski | 66 kg: Laszlo Szoke; 73 kg: Marcel Cercea; 81 kg: Vlad Vişan; 90 kg: Cristian Bodîrlău +90 kg: Daniel Natea |
| Russia | Serbia | Turkey | Ukraine |
| 66 kg: Anzaur Ardanov; Abdula Abdulzhalilov; 73 kg: Uali Kurzhev; Denis Iartcev; 81 kg: Denis Kalinin; Stanislav Semenov; 90 kg: Magomed Magomedov; Khusen Khalmurzaev +90 kg: Andrey Volkov; Renat Saidov | 66 kg & 73 kg: Strahinja Bunčić; 66 kg: Marko Vukićević; 73 kg & 81 kg: Filip Mosić; 81 kg & 90 kg: Bojan Došen; 90 kg: Aleksandar Kukolj +90 kg: Žarko Ćulum | 66 kg: Sinan Sandal; 73 kg: Hasan Vanlıoğlu; 81 kg: İlker Güldüren; 90 kg: Batuhan Efemgil +90 kg: Feyyaz Yazıcı | 66 kg: Gevorg Khachatrian; 73 kg: Dmytro Kanivets; 81 kg: Sergii Krivchach; 90 kg: Quedjau Nhabali; Vadym Synyavsky +90 kg: Stanislav Bondarenko; Iakiv Khammo |

== Results ==
First Round
Georgia | 4
Italy | 1
Austria | 2
Serbia | 3
Poland | 2
Hungary | 3
Germany | 2
Ukraine | 3
Russia | 4
Turkey | 1
Netherlands | 3
Romania | 2
Azerbaijan | 5
Montenegro | 0
Czech Republic | 2
France | 3

Quarterfinals
Georgia | 4
Serbia | 1
Hungary | 1
Ukraine | 4
Russia | 4
Netherlands | 1
Azerbaijan | 2
France | 3

Semifinals
Georgia | 3
Ukraine | 2
Russia | 5
France | 0

Final
Georgia | 3
Russia | 2

=== Repechage ===
| Repechage | | Third place |
| Serbia | 1 |
| Hungary | 4 | Hungary | 4 |
| | | France | 1 |

| Repechage | | Third place |
| Netherlands | 1 |
| Azerbaijan | 4 | Azerbaijan | 0 |
| | | Ukraine | 5 |
