= 2014 Judo Grand Prix Budapest =

Judo competition

Judo 2014 Judo Grand Prix Budapest
- Location: Budapest, Hungary
- Dates: 21–22 June 2014
- Competitors: 405 from 53 nations

Competition at external databases
- Links: IJF • EJU • JudoInside

The 2014 Judo Grand Prix Budapest was held in Budapest, Hungary from 21 to 22 June 2014.

== Medal summary ==
=== Men's events ===
Event	Gold	Silver	Bronze
Extra-lightweight (−60 kg)	Naohisa Takato (JPN)	Amiran Papinashvili (GEO)	Sofiane Milous (FRA)
Extra-lightweight (−60 kg)	Naohisa Takato (JPN)	Amiran Papinashvili (GEO)	Ilgar Mushkiyev (AZE)
Half-lightweight (−66 kg)	Kengo Takaichi (JPN)	Dzmitry Shershan (BLR)	Nijat Shikhalizada (AZE)
Half-lightweight (−66 kg)	Kengo Takaichi (JPN)	Dzmitry Shershan (BLR)	Georgii Zantaraia (UKR)
Lightweight (−73 kg)	Victor Scvortov (UAE)	Lasha Shavdatuashvili (GEO)	Khashbaataryn Tsagaanbaatar (MGL)
Lightweight (−73 kg)	Victor Scvortov (UAE)	Lasha Shavdatuashvili (GEO)	Zebeda Rekhviashvili (GEO)
Half-middleweight (−81 kg)	Khasan Khalmurzaev (RUS)	Sirazhudin Magomedov (RUS)	Vedat Albayrak (GRE)
Half-middleweight (−81 kg)	Khasan Khalmurzaev (RUS)	Sirazhudin Magomedov (RUS)	Alain Schmitt (FRA)
Middleweight (−90 kg)	Daiki Nishiyama (JPN)	Krisztián Tóth (HUN)	Khusen Khalmurzaev (RUS)
Middleweight (−90 kg)	Daiki Nishiyama (JPN)	Krisztián Tóth (HUN)	Noël van 't End (NED)
Half-heavyweight (−100 kg)	Henk Grol (NED)	Ryunosuke Haga (JPN)	Elmar Gasimov (AZE)
Half-heavyweight (−100 kg)	Henk Grol (NED)	Ryunosuke Haga (JPN)	Martin Pacek (SWE)
Heavyweight (+100 kg)	Adam Okruashvili (GEO)	Marius Paškevičius (LTU)	Levani Matiashvili (GEO)
Heavyweight (+100 kg)	Adam Okruashvili (GEO)	Marius Paškevičius (LTU)	Andrey Volkov (RUS)

=== Women's events ===
Event	Gold	Silver	Bronze
Extra-lightweight (−48 kg)	Éva Csernoviczki (HUN)	Valentina Moscatt (ITA)	Otgontsetseg Galbadrakh (MGL)
Extra-lightweight (−48 kg)	Éva Csernoviczki (HUN)	Valentina Moscatt (ITA)	Ami Kondo (JPN)
Half-lightweight (−52 kg)	Majlinda Kelmendi (KOS)	Odette Giuffrida (ITA)	Petra Nareks (SLO)
Half-lightweight (−52 kg)	Majlinda Kelmendi (KOS)	Odette Giuffrida (ITA)	Oleksandra Starkova (UKR)
Lightweight (−57 kg)	Kaori Matsumoto (JPN)	Hélène Receveaux (FRA)	Vlora Beđeti (SLO)
Lightweight (−57 kg)	Kaori Matsumoto (JPN)	Hélène Receveaux (FRA)	Hedvig Karakas (HUN)
Half-middleweight (−63 kg)	Miku Tashiro (JPN)	Martyna Trajdos (GER)	Maelle Di Cintio (FRA)
Half-middleweight (−63 kg)	Miku Tashiro (JPN)	Martyna Trajdos (GER)	Anicka van Emden (NED)
Middleweight (−70 kg)	Iljana Marzok (GER)	Barbara Matić (CRO)	Karen Nun-Ira (JPN)
Middleweight (−70 kg)	Iljana Marzok (GER)	Barbara Matić (CRO)	Fanny Estelle Posvite (FRA)
Half-heavyweight (−78 kg)	Marhinde Verkerk (NED)	Anamari Velenšek (SLO)	Abigél Joó (HUN)
Half-heavyweight (−78 kg)	Marhinde Verkerk (NED)	Anamari Velenšek (SLO)	Natalie Powell (GBR)
Heavyweight (+78 kg)	Megumi Tachimoto (JPN)	Svitlana Iaromka (UKR)	Larisa Cerić (BIH)
Heavyweight (+78 kg)	Megumi Tachimoto (JPN)	Svitlana Iaromka (UKR)	Jasmin Kuelbs (GER)

Source Results

=== Medal table ===
* Host nation (Hungary)

Rank	Nation	Gold	Silver	Bronze	Total
1	Japan (JPN)	6	1	2	9
2	Netherlands (NED)	2	0	2	4
3	Georgia (GEO)	1	2	2	5
4	Hungary (HUN)*	1	1	2	4
4	Russia (RUS)	1	1	2	4
6	Germany (GER)	1	1	1	3
7	Kosovo (KOS)	1	0	0	1
7	United Arab Emirates (UAE)	1	0	0	1
9	Italy (ITA)	0	2	0	2
10	France (FRA)	0	1	4	5
11	Slovenia (SLO)	0	1	2	3
11	Ukraine (UKR)	0	1	2	3
13	Belarus (BLR)	0	1	0	1
13	Croatia (CRO)	0	1	0	1
13	Lithuania (LTU)	0	1	0	1
16	Azerbaijan (AZE)	0	0	3	3
17	Mongolia (MGL)	0	0	2	2
18	Bosnia and Herzegovina (BIH)	0	0	1	1
18	Great Britain (GBR)	0	0	1	1
18	Greece (GRE)	0	0	1	1
18	Sweden (SWE)	0	0	1	1
Totals (21 entries)		14	14	28	56
