= 2012 Judo Grand Slam Rio de Janeiro =

Judo competition

Judo 2012 Judo Grand Slam Rio de Janeiro
- Location: Rio de Janeiro, Brazil
- Dates: 9–10 June 2012
- Competitors: 117 from 18 nations

Competition at external databases
- Links: IJF • JudoInside

The 2012 Judo Grand Slam Rio de Janeiro was held in Rio de Janeiro, Brazil, from 9 to 10 June 2012.

== Medal summary ==
=== Men's events ===
Event	Gold	Silver	Bronze
Extra-lightweight (−60 kg)	Bekir Özlü (GEO)	Diego Dos Santos (BRA)	Breno Alves (BRA)
Extra-lightweight (−60 kg)	Bekir Özlü (GEO)	Diego Dos Santos (BRA)	Amiran Papinashvili (GEO)
Half-lightweight (−66 kg)	Denis Lavrentiev (RUS)	Fernando González (ARG)	Danilo Ferrante (BRA)
Half-lightweight (−66 kg)	Denis Lavrentiev (RUS)	Fernando González (ARG)	Lasha Shavdatuashvili (GEO)
Lightweight (−73 kg)	Marcelo Contini (BRA)	Adriano Santos (BRA)	Alexis Morin-Martel (CAN)
Lightweight (−73 kg)	Marcelo Contini (BRA)	Adriano Santos (BRA)	Alex Pombo (BRA)
Half-middleweight (−81 kg)	Victor Penalber (BRA)	Travis Stevens (USA)	Maxim Buga (RUS)
Half-middleweight (−81 kg)	Victor Penalber (BRA)	Travis Stevens (USA)	Felipe Costa (BRA)
Middleweight (−90 kg)	Varlam Liparteliani (GEO)	Héctor Campos (ARG)	Thomas Briceño (CHI)
Middleweight (−90 kg)	Varlam Liparteliani (GEO)	Héctor Campos (ARG)	Eduardo Bettoni (BRA)
Half-heavyweight (−100 kg)	Irakli Tsirekidze (GEO)	Hugo Pessanha (BRA)	Renan Nunes (BRA)
Half-heavyweight (−100 kg)	Irakli Tsirekidze (GEO)	Hugo Pessanha (BRA)	Cristian Schmidt (ARG)
Heavyweight (+100 kg)	Adam Okruashvili (GEO)	Walter Santos (BRA)	Daniel Hernandes (BRA)
Heavyweight (+100 kg)	Adam Okruashvili (GEO)	Walter Santos (BRA)	David Moura (BRA)

=== Women's events ===
Event	Gold	Silver	Bronze
Extra-lightweight (−48 kg)	Paula Pareto (ARG)	Gabriela Chibana (BRA)	Agueda Silva (BRA)
Extra-lightweight (−48 kg)	Paula Pareto (ARG)	Gabriela Chibana (BRA)	Catiere Toledo (BRA)
Half-lightweight (−52 kg)	Eleudis Valentim (BRA)	Milena Mendes (BRA)	María García (DOM)
Half-lightweight (−52 kg)	Eleudis Valentim (BRA)	Milena Mendes (BRA)	Ilse Heylen (BEL)
Lightweight (−57 kg)	Jovana Rogić (SRB)	Flávia Gomes (BRA)	Juliene Aryecha (BRA)
Lightweight (−57 kg)	Jovana Rogić (SRB)	Flávia Gomes (BRA)	Camila Minakawa (BRA)
Half-middleweight (−63 kg)	Mariana Barros (BRA)	Katherine Campos (BRA)	Manoella Costa (BRA)
Half-middleweight (−63 kg)	Mariana Barros (BRA)	Katherine Campos (BRA)	Dione Barbosa De Lima (BRA)
Middleweight (−70 kg)	Nadia Merli (BRA)	Amanda Oliveira (BRA)	Helena Romanelli (BRA)
Half-heavyweight (−78 kg)	Kayla Harrison (USA)	Samanta Soares (BRA)	Talita Morais (BRA)
Heavyweight (+78 kg)	Vanessa Zambotti (MEX)	Claudirene César (BRA)	Rafaela Nitz (BRA)
Heavyweight (+78 kg)	Vanessa Zambotti (MEX)	Claudirene César (BRA)	Rochele Nunes (BRA)

Source Results

=== Medal table ===
* Host nation (Brazil)

Rank	Nation	Gold	Silver	Bronze	Total
1	Brazil (BRA)*	5	11	18	34
2	Georgia (GEO)	4	0	2	6
3	Argentina (ARG)	1	2	1	4
4	United States (USA)	1	1	0	2
5	Russia (RUS)	1	0	1	2
6	Mexico (MEX)	1	0	0	1
6	Serbia (SRB)	1	0	0	1
8	Belgium (BEL)	0	0	1	1
8	Canada (CAN)	0	0	1	1
8	Chile (CHI)	0	0	1	1
8	Dominican Republic (DOM)	0	0	1	1
Totals (11 entries)		14	14	26	54
