= Daiki Nishiyama =

Japanese judoka

Personal information
- Nationality: Japanese
- Born: 20 November 1990 (age 35)
- Occupation: Judoka

Sport
- Country: Japan
- Sport: Judo
- Weight class: ‍–‍90 kg, ‍–‍100 kg

Achievements and titles
- World Champ.: (silver) (2010, 2011)
- Asian Champ.: (silver) (2011, 2015)
Medal record
Men's judo
Representing Japan
World Championships
Silver medal – second place	2010 Tokyo	‍–‍90 kg
Silver medal – second place	2011 Paris	‍–‍90 kg
Asian Championships
Silver medal – second place	2011 Abu Dhabi	‍–‍90 kg
Silver medal – second place	2015 Kuwait City	‍–‍90 kg
IJF Grand Slam
Gold medal – first place	2011 Paris	‍–‍90 kg
Gold medal – first place	2016 Paris	‍–‍90 kg
Silver medal – second place	2009 Tokyo	‍–‍90 kg
Silver medal – second place	2010 Moscow	‍–‍90 kg
Silver medal – second place	2011 Moscow	‍–‍90 kg
Silver medal – second place	2014 Tokyo	‍–‍90 kg
Bronze medal – third place	2010 Rio de Janeiro	‍–‍90 kg
Bronze medal – third place	2013 Tokyo	‍–‍90 kg
Bronze medal – third place	2015 Tokyo	‍–‍90 kg
Bronze medal – third place	2016 Tokyo	‍–‍90 kg
IJF Grand Prix
Gold medal – first place	2014 Budapest	‍–‍90 kg
Bronze medal – third place	2014 Düsseldorf	‍–‍90 kg
Bronze medal – third place	2015 Düsseldorf	‍–‍90 kg
Bronze medal – third place	2017 Düsseldorf	‍–‍90 kg
Bronze medal – third place	2018 Hohhot	‍–‍100 kg
World Juniors Championships
Bronze medal – third place	2009 Paris	‍–‍90 kg

Profile at external databases
- IJF: 1347
- JudoInside.com: 56577
- Updated on 17 July 2023

Daiki Nishiyama (西山 大希, Nishiyama Daiki; born 20 November 1990 in Higashihiroshima, Hiroshima) is a Japanese judoka. He won the silver medal in the middleweight (90 kg) division at the 2010 and 2011 World Judo Championships. Because of Nishiyama's ranking and recent form it has come as even more of a surprise that he was not included in the Japan squad for the 2012 Olympics. The Japanese judo association instead went with the more experienced Masashi Nishiyama in the ‍–‍90 kg category.
