= 2004 European Cadet Judo Championships =

Judo competition

Judo 2004 European Cadet Judo Championships
- Location: Rotterdam, Netherlands
- Dates: 3–4 July 2004

Competition at external databases
- Links: JudoInside

The 2004 European Cadet Judo Championships is an edition of the European Cadet Judo Championships, organised by the International Judo Federation. It was held in Rotterdam, Netherlands from 3 to 4 July 2004.

== Medal summary ==
=== Medal table ===
* Host nation (Netherlands)

Rank	Nation	Gold	Silver	Bronze	Total
1	Azerbaijan (AZE)	4	1	2	7
2	Germany (GER)	3	0	6	9
3	Russia (RUS)	2	3	6	11
4	Romania (ROU)	2	0	3	5
5	Georgia (GEO)	1	3	3	7
6	Netherlands (NED)	1	2	2	5
7	Austria (AUT)	1	0	2	3
8	Italy (ITA)	1	0	1	2
9	Israel (ISR)	1	0	0	1
10	Great Britain (GBR)	0	2	1	3
11	Hungary (HUN)	0	1	2	3
12	France (FRA)	0	1	1	2
12	Ukraine (UKR)	0	1	1	2
14	Moldova (MDA)	0	1	0	1
14	Slovenia (SLO)	0	1	0	1
16	Belgium (BEL)	0	0	1	1
16	Poland (POL)	0	0	1	1
Totals (17 entries)		16	16	32	64

=== Men's events ===
Event	Gold	Silver	Bronze
−50 kg	Cezar Rusu (ROU)	Robert Mshvidobadze (GEO)	Bence Zámbori (HUN)
−50 kg	Cezar Rusu (ROU)	Robert Mshvidobadze (GEO)	Maxim Nikolaev (RUS)
−55 kg	Nijat Shikhalizada (AZE)	Bekir Özlü (GEO)	Igor Pukhov (RUS)
−55 kg	Nijat Shikhalizada (AZE)	Bekir Özlü (GEO)	Tomasz Kowalski (POL)
−60 kg	David Tsikhelashvili (GEO)	Mikhail Naniy (RUS)	Elman Nasibov (AZE)
−60 kg	David Tsikhelashvili (GEO)	Mikhail Naniy (RUS)	Nils Dochow (GER)
−66 kg	Elshan Karimov (AZE)	Victor Scvortov (MDA)	Alexander Holzmann (GER)
−66 kg	Elshan Karimov (AZE)	Victor Scvortov (MDA)	Adrian Merge (ROU)
−73 kg	Elnur Mammadli (AZE)	Kirill Denisov (RUS)	Albert Fercher (AUT)
−73 kg	Elnur Mammadli (AZE)	Kirill Denisov (RUS)	Givi Demetrashvili (GEO)
−81 kg	Timur Alikhanov (AZE)	Aleksander Makeev (RUS)	David Karbelashvili (GEO)
−81 kg	Timur Alikhanov (AZE)	Aleksander Makeev (RUS)	David Groom (GBR)
−90 kg	Jeffrey Schulz (GER)	Jeffrey van Emden (NED)	Aleksandre Mskhaladze (GEO)
−90 kg	Jeffrey Schulz (GER)	Jeffrey van Emden (NED)	David Bitiev (RUS)
+90 kg	Mauro Troisi (ITA)	Adam Okruashvili (GEO)	Mekhman Novruzov (AZE)
+90 kg	Mauro Troisi (ITA)	Adam Okruashvili (GEO)	Daniel Selling (GER)

=== Women's events ===
Event	Gold	Silver	Bronze
−40 kg	Violeta Dumitru (ROU)	Inna Cherniak (UKR)	Nikki Pluymaekers (NED)
−40 kg	Violeta Dumitru (ROU)	Inna Cherniak (UKR)	Yulia Korchagina (RUS)
−44 kg	Natalia Kuziutina (RUS)	Sinead Rothwell (GBR)	Xena Evers (NED)
−44 kg	Natalia Kuziutina (RUS)	Sinead Rothwell (GBR)	Anna Vasylevich (UKR)
−48 kg	Susi Zimmermann (GER)	Monika Grzelewska (GBR)	Hanne Van Bossele (BEL)
−48 kg	Susi Zimmermann (GER)	Monika Grzelewska (GBR)	Monica Ungureanu (ROU)
−52 kg	Irina Binder (RUS)	Lilla Tóth (HUN)	Andreea Chițu (ROU)
−52 kg	Irina Binder (RUS)	Lilla Tóth (HUN)	Anne-Laure Cowe (FRA)
−57 kg	Alice Schlesinger (ISR)	Michelle Diemeer (NED)	Brigitta Szigetvölgyi (HUN)
−57 kg	Alice Schlesinger (ISR)	Michelle Diemeer (NED)	Mélanie Gerber (GER)
−63 kg	Linda Bolder (NED)	Sona Ahmadli (AZE)	Andrea Kufner (AUT)
−63 kg	Linda Bolder (NED)	Sona Ahmadli (AZE)	Jana Stucke (GER)
−70 kg	Hedwig Lechenauer (AUT)	Lea Murko (SLO)	Elena Grabova (RUS)
−70 kg	Hedwig Lechenauer (AUT)	Lea Murko (SLO)	Barbara Baur (GER)
+70 kg	Christina Krahe (GER)	Cécile Delwail (FRA)	Ksenia Chibisova (RUS)
+70 kg	Christina Krahe (GER)	Cécile Delwail (FRA)	Lucia Tangorre (ITA)

Source Results
