= 2004 World Judo Juniors Championships =

Judo competition

Judo 2004 World Judo Juniors Championships
- Location: Budapest, Hungary
- Dates: 14–17 October 2004

Competition at external databases
- Links: JudoInside

The 2004 World Judo Juniors Championships was an edition of the World Judo Juniors Championships, organised by the International Judo Federation. It was held in Budapest, Hungary from 14 to 17 October 2004.

== Medal summary ==
=== Men's events ===
Event	Gold	Silver	Bronze
Extra-lightweight (−60 kg)	David Larose (FRA)	László Burján (HUN)	Hiroaki Hiraoka (JPN)
Extra-lightweight (−60 kg)	David Larose (FRA)	László Burján (HUN)	Aset Tusupov (KAZ)
Half-lightweight (−66 kg)	Hiroyuki Akimoto (JPN)	Zaza Kedelashvili (GEO)	Costel Danculea (ROU)
Half-lightweight (−66 kg)	Hiroyuki Akimoto (JPN)	Zaza Kedelashvili (GEO)	Konyshbay Shpanov (KAZ)
Lightweight (−73 kg)	Kim Jae-bum (KOR)	Mohamed Bouguerra (TUN)	Roman Mishura (RUS)
Lightweight (−73 kg)	Kim Jae-bum (KOR)	Mohamed Bouguerra (TUN)	Masahiko Otsuka (JPN)
Half-middleweight (−81 kg)	Erekle Kopaliani (RUS)	Ryuji Hanamoto (JPN)	Tijke van de Loo (NED)
Half-middleweight (−81 kg)	Erekle Kopaliani (RUS)	Ryuji Hanamoto (JPN)	Krzysztof Węglarz (POL)
Middleweight (−90 kg)	Jevgeņijs Borodavko (LAT)	Cheon Choi (KOR)	Henk Grol (NED)
Middleweight (−90 kg)	Jevgeņijs Borodavko (LAT)	Cheon Choi (KOR)	Samvel Sargsyan (RUS)
Half-heavyweight (−100 kg)	Satoshi Ishii (JPN)	Yauheni Kavalevski (BLR)	Benjamin Behrla (GER)
Half-heavyweight (−100 kg)	Satoshi Ishii (JPN)	Yauheni Kavalevski (BLR)	Tomas Vaicekonis (LTU)
Heavyweight (+100 kg)	Lasha Gujejiani (GEO)	Barna Bor (HUN)	Ivan Iliev (BUL)
Heavyweight (+100 kg)	Lasha Gujejiani (GEO)	Barna Bor (HUN)	Adiljan Tulendibaev (UZB)

=== Women's events ===
Event	Gold	Silver	Bronze
Extra-lightweight (−48 kg)	Tomoko Fukumi (JPN)	Nataliya Kondratyeva (RUS)	Emilie Lafont (FRA)
Extra-lightweight (−48 kg)	Tomoko Fukumi (JPN)	Nataliya Kondratyeva (RUS)	Xiaonan Ma (CHN)
Half-lightweight (−52 kg)	Yuka Nishida (JPN)	Delphine Delsalle (FRA)	Anna Kharitonova (RUS)
Half-lightweight (−52 kg)	Yuka Nishida (JPN)	Delphine Delsalle (FRA)	Telma Monteiro (POR)
Lightweight (−57 kg)	Mai Hiromura (JPN)	Anicka van Emden (NED)	Chloé Guerrier (FRA)
Lightweight (−57 kg)	Mai Hiromura (JPN)	Anicka van Emden (NED)	Alice Schlesinger (ISR)
Half-middleweight (−63 kg)	Ronda Rousey (USA)	Jing Jing Mao (CHN)	Irina Gromova (RUS)
Half-middleweight (−63 kg)	Ronda Rousey (USA)	Jing Jing Mao (CHN)	Margot Wetzer (NED)
Middleweight (−70 kg)	Anett Mészáros (HUN)	Olesya Ovseichuk (RUS)	Park Ka-yeon (KOR)
Middleweight (−70 kg)	Anett Mészáros (HUN)	Olesya Ovseichuk (RUS)	Katarzyna Kłys (POL)
Half-heavyweight (−78 kg)	Hitomi Ikeda (JPN)	Franziska Konitz (GER)	Lucie Louette (FRA)
Half-heavyweight (−78 kg)	Hitomi Ikeda (JPN)	Franziska Konitz (GER)	Flora Mkhitaryan (RUS)
Heavyweight (+78 kg)	Mai Tateyama (JPN)	Sirui Yan (CHN)	Gülşah Kocatürk (TUR)
Heavyweight (+78 kg)	Mai Tateyama (JPN)	Sirui Yan (CHN)	Aline Puglia (BRA)

Source Results

=== Medal table ===
* Host nation (Hungary)

Rank	Nation	Gold	Silver	Bronze	Total
1	Japan (JPN)	7	1	2	10
2	Russia (RUS)	1	2	5	8
3	Hungary (HUN)*	1	2	0	3
4	France (FRA)	1	1	3	5
5	South Korea (KOR)	1	1	1	3
6	Georgia (GEO)	1	1	0	2
7	Latvia (LAT)	1	0	0	1
7	United States (USA)	1	0	0	1
9	China (CHN)	0	2	1	3
10	Netherlands (NED)	0	1	3	4
11	Germany (GER)	0	1	1	2
12	Belarus (BLR)	0	1	0	1
12	Tunisia (TUN)	0	1	0	1
14	Kazakhstan (KAZ)	0	0	2	2
14	Poland (POL)	0	0	2	2
16	Brazil (BRA)	0	0	1	1
16	Bulgaria (BUL)	0	0	1	1
16	Israel (ISR)	0	0	1	1
16	Lithuania (LTU)	0	0	1	1
16	Portugal (POR)	0	0	1	1
16	Romania (ROU)	0	0	1	1
16	Turkey (TUR)	0	0	1	1
16	Uzbekistan (UZB)	0	0	1	1
Totals (23 entries)		14	14	28	56
