= Krzysztof Węglarz =

Polish judoka

Personal information
- Born: 21 February 1985 (age 41)
- Occupation: Judoka

Sport
- Country: Poland
- Sport: Judo
- Weight class: –81 kg, –90 kg

Achievements and titles
- World Champ.: R32 (2011)
- European Champ.: 5th (2006)
Medal record
Men's judo
Representing Poland
European U23 Championships
Gold medal – first place	2006 Moscow	–90 kg
World Juniors Championships
Bronze medal – third place	2004 Budapest	–81 kg

Profile at external databases
- IJF: 2751
- JudoInside.com: 23510
- Updated on 10 February 2022

Krzysztof Węglarz (born 21 February 1985) is a Polish judoka.

He won the bronze medal in the 81 kg class at the 2004 World Junior Championships and finished fifth in the middleweight (90 kg) class at the 2006 European Judo Championships.

He also competed at the 2010 and 2011 World Championships.
