= 2010 Judo Grand Slam Rio de Janeiro =

Judo competition

Judo 2010 Judo Grand Slam Rio de Janeiro
- Location: Rio de Janeiro, Brazil
- Dates: 22–23 May 2010
- Competitors: 355 from 40 nations

Competition at external databases
- Links: IJF • JudoInside

The 2010 Judo Grand Slam Rio de Janeiro was held in Rio de Janeiro, Brazil, from 22 to 23 May 2010.

== Medal summary ==
=== Men's events ===
Event	Gold	Silver	Bronze
Extra-lightweight (−60 kg)	Hiroaki Hiraoka (JPN)	Rishod Sobirov (UZB)	Arsen Galstyan (RUS)
Extra-lightweight (−60 kg)	Hiroaki Hiraoka (JPN)	Rishod Sobirov (UZB)	Jeroen Mooren (NED)
Half-lightweight (−66 kg)	Alim Gadanov (RUS)	Elio Verde (ITA)	Loïc Korval (FRA)
Half-lightweight (−66 kg)	Alim Gadanov (RUS)	Elio Verde (ITA)	Sanjaasürengiin Miyaaragchaa (MGL)
Lightweight (−73 kg)	Hiroyuki Akimoto (JPN)	Attila Ungvári (HUN)	Dirk Van Tichelt (BEL)
Lightweight (−73 kg)	Hiroyuki Akimoto (JPN)	Attila Ungvári (HUN)	Krzysztof Wiłkomirski (POL)
Half-middleweight (−81 kg)	Tomislav Marijanović (CRO)	Guillaume Elmont (NED)	Flávio Canto (BRA)
Half-middleweight (−81 kg)	Tomislav Marijanović (CRO)	Guillaume Elmont (NED)	Leandro Guilheiro (BRA)
Middleweight (−90 kg)	Hugo Pessanha (BRA)	Kirill Denisov (RUS)	Varlam Liparteliani (GEO)
Middleweight (−90 kg)	Hugo Pessanha (BRA)	Kirill Denisov (RUS)	Daiki Nishiyama (JPN)
Half-heavyweight (−100 kg)	Elco van der Geest (BEL)	Takamasa Anai (JPN)	Ramadan Darwish (EGY)
Half-heavyweight (−100 kg)	Elco van der Geest (BEL)	Takamasa Anai (JPN)	Levan Zhorzholiani (GEO)
Heavyweight (+100 kg)	Kazuhiko Takahashi (JPN)	Andreas Tölzer (GER)	Islam El Shehaby (EGY)
Heavyweight (+100 kg)	Kazuhiko Takahashi (JPN)	Andreas Tölzer (GER)	Keiji Suzuki (JPN)

=== Women's events ===
Event	Gold	Silver	Bronze
Extra-lightweight (−48 kg)	Tomoko Fukumi (JPN)	Frédérique Jossinet (FRA)	Nataliya Kondratyeva (RUS)
Extra-lightweight (−48 kg)	Tomoko Fukumi (JPN)	Frédérique Jossinet (FRA)	Wu Shugen (CHN)
Half-lightweight (−52 kg)	Misato Nakamura (JPN)	Marie Muller (LUX)	He Hongmei (CHN)
Half-lightweight (−52 kg)	Misato Nakamura (JPN)	Marie Muller (LUX)	Romy Tarangul (GER)
Lightweight (−57 kg)	Kaori Matsumoto (JPN)	Telma Monteiro (POR)	Sabrina Filzmoser (AUT)
Lightweight (−57 kg)	Kaori Matsumoto (JPN)	Telma Monteiro (POR)	Viola Wächter (GER)
Half-middleweight (−63 kg)	Yoshie Ueno (JPN)	Marta Labazina (RUS)	Mariana Silva (BRA)
Half-middleweight (−63 kg)	Yoshie Ueno (JPN)	Marta Labazina (RUS)	Claudia Malzahn (GER)
Middleweight (−70 kg)	Lucie Décosse (FRA)	Edith Bosch (NED)	Yoriko Kunihara (JPN)
Middleweight (−70 kg)	Lucie Décosse (FRA)	Edith Bosch (NED)	Raša Sraka (SLO)
Half-heavyweight (−78 kg)	Ruika Sato (JPN)	Akari Ogata (JPN)	Mayra Aguiar (BRA)
Half-heavyweight (−78 kg)	Ruika Sato (JPN)	Akari Ogata (JPN)	Audrey Tcheuméo (FRA)
Heavyweight (+78 kg)	Lucija Polavder (SLO)	Maria Suelen Altheman (BRA)	Idalys Ortiz (CUB)
Heavyweight (+78 kg)	Lucija Polavder (SLO)	Maria Suelen Altheman (BRA)	Urszula Sadkowska (POL)

Source Results

=== Medal table ===
* Host nation (Brazil)

Rank	Nation	Gold	Silver	Bronze	Total
1	Japan (JPN)	8	2	3	13
2	Russia (RUS)	1	2	2	5
3	Brazil (BRA)*	1	1	4	6
4	France (FRA)	1	1	2	4
5	Belgium (BEL)	1	0	1	2
5	Slovenia (SLO)	1	0	1	2
7	Croatia (CRO)	1	0	0	1
8	Netherlands (NED)	0	2	1	3
9	Germany (GER)	0	1	3	4
10	Hungary (HUN)	0	1	0	1
10	Italy (ITA)	0	1	0	1
10	Luxembourg (LUX)	0	1	0	1
10	Portugal (POR)	0	1	0	1
10	Uzbekistan (UZB)	0	1	0	1
15	China (CHN)	0	0	2	2
15	Egypt (EGY)	0	0	2	2
15	Georgia (GEO)	0	0	2	2
15	Poland (POL)	0	0	2	2
19	Austria (AUT)	0	0	1	1
19	Cuba (CUB)	0	0	1	1
19	Mongolia (MGL)	0	0	1	1
Totals (21 entries)		14	14	28	56
