= 2011 Judo Grand Slam Moscow =

Judo competition

Judo 2011 Judo Grand Slam Moscow
- Location: Moscow, Russia
- Dates: 27–29 May 2011
- Competitors: 458 from 63 nations

Competition at external databases
- Links: IJF • JudoInside

The 2011 Judo Grand Slam Moscow was held in Moscow, Russia, from 27 to 29 May 2011.

== Medal summary ==
=== Men's events ===
Event	Gold	Silver	Bronze
Extra-lightweight (−60 kg)	Rishod Sobirov (UZB)	Sofiane Milous (FRA)	Hirofumi Yamamoto (JPN)
Extra-lightweight (−60 kg)	Rishod Sobirov (UZB)	Sofiane Milous (FRA)	Davaadorjiin Tömörkhüleg (MGL)
Half-lightweight (−66 kg)	Alim Gadanov (RUS)	Tomasz Kowalski (POL)	Musa Mogushkov (RUS)
Half-lightweight (−66 kg)	Alim Gadanov (RUS)	Tomasz Kowalski (POL)	Cho Jun-ho (KOR)
Lightweight (−73 kg)	Dex Elmont (NED)	Christopher Völk (GER)	Dirk Van Tichelt (BEL)
Lightweight (−73 kg)	Dex Elmont (NED)	Christopher Völk (GER)	Murat Kodzokov (RUS)
Half-middleweight (−81 kg)	Sven Maresch (GER)	Travis Stevens (USA)	Ole Bischof (GER)
Half-middleweight (−81 kg)	Sven Maresch (GER)	Travis Stevens (USA)	Islam Bozbayev (KAZ)
Middleweight (−90 kg)	Ilias Iliadis (GRE)	Daiki Nishiyama (JPN)	Hugo Pessanha (BRA)
Middleweight (−90 kg)	Ilias Iliadis (GRE)	Daiki Nishiyama (JPN)	Roberto Meloni (ITA)
Half-heavyweight (−100 kg)	Ariel Ze'evi (ISR)	Cyrille Maret (FRA)	Maxim Rakov (KAZ)
Half-heavyweight (−100 kg)	Ariel Ze'evi (ISR)	Cyrille Maret (FRA)	Ramziddin Sayidov (UZB)
Heavyweight (+100 kg)	Kim Soo-whan (KOR)	Dmitry Sterkhov (RUS)	Janusz Wojnarowicz (POL)
Heavyweight (+100 kg)	Kim Soo-whan (KOR)	Dmitry Sterkhov (RUS)	Abdullo Tangriev (UZB)

=== Women's events ===
Event	Gold	Silver	Bronze
Extra-lightweight (−48 kg)	Tomoko Fukumi (JPN)	Nataliya Kondratyeva (RUS)	Frédérique Jossinet (FRA)
Extra-lightweight (−48 kg)	Tomoko Fukumi (JPN)	Nataliya Kondratyeva (RUS)	Elena Moretti (ITA)
Half-lightweight (−52 kg)	Mönkhbaataryn Bundmaa (MGL)	Yuka Nishida (JPN)	Joana Ramos (POR)
Half-lightweight (−52 kg)	Mönkhbaataryn Bundmaa (MGL)	Yuka Nishida (JPN)	Natalia Kuziutina (RUS)
Lightweight (−57 kg)	Aiko Sato (JPN)	Automne Pavia (FRA)	Irina Zabludina (RUS)
Lightweight (−57 kg)	Aiko Sato (JPN)	Automne Pavia (FRA)	Sabrina Filzmoser (AUT)
Half-middleweight (−63 kg)	Urška Žolnir (SLO)	Tsedevsürengiin Mönkhzayaa (MGL)	Xu Lili (CHN)
Half-middleweight (−63 kg)	Urška Žolnir (SLO)	Tsedevsürengiin Mönkhzayaa (MGL)	Yarden Gerbi (ISR)
Middleweight (−70 kg)	Edith Bosch (NED)	Haruka Tachimoto (JPN)	Chen Fei (CHN)
Middleweight (−70 kg)	Edith Bosch (NED)	Haruka Tachimoto (JPN)	Juliane Robra (SUI)
Half-heavyweight (−78 kg)	Akari Ogata (JPN)	Abigél Joó (HUN)	Lucie Louette (FRA)
Half-heavyweight (−78 kg)	Akari Ogata (JPN)	Abigél Joó (HUN)	Mayra Aguiar (BRA)
Heavyweight (+78 kg)	Tong Wen (CHN)	Kim Na-young (KOR)	Megumi Tachimoto (JPN)
Heavyweight (+78 kg)	Tong Wen (CHN)	Kim Na-young (KOR)	Gülşah Kocatürk (TUR)

Source Results

=== Medal table ===
* Host nation (Russia)

Rank	Nation	Gold	Silver	Bronze	Total
1	Japan (JPN)	3	3	2	8
2	Netherlands (NED)	2	0	0	2
3	Russia (RUS)*	1	2	4	7
4	Germany (GER)	1	1	1	3
4	Mongolia (MGL)	1	1	1	3
4	South Korea (KOR)	1	1	1	3
7	China (CHN)	1	0	2	3
7	Uzbekistan (UZB)	1	0	2	3
9	Israel (ISR)	1	0	1	2
10	Greece (GRE)	1	0	0	1
10	Slovenia (SLO)	1	0	0	1
12	France (FRA)	0	3	2	5
13	Poland (POL)	0	1	1	2
14	Hungary (HUN)	0	1	0	1
14	United States (USA)	0	1	0	1
16	Brazil (BRA)	0	0	2	2
16	Italy (ITA)	0	0	2	2
16	Kazakhstan (KAZ)	0	0	2	2
19	Austria (AUT)	0	0	1	1
19	Belgium (BEL)	0	0	1	1
19	Portugal (POR)	0	0	1	1
19	Switzerland (SUI)	0	0	1	1
19	Turkey (TUR)	0	0	1	1
Totals (23 entries)		14	14	28	56
