= 2009 Judo Grand Slam Rio de Janeiro =

Judo competition

Judo 2009 Judo Grand Slam Rio de Janeiro
- Location: Rio de Janeiro, Brazil
- Dates: 4–5 July 2009
- Competitors: 200 from 25 nations

Competition at external databases
- Links: IJF • JudoInside

The 2009 Judo Grand Slam Rio de Janeiro was held in Rio de Janeiro, Brazil, from 4 to 5 July 2009.

== Medal summary ==
=== Men's events ===
Event	Gold	Silver	Bronze
Extra-lightweight (−60 kg)	Ludwig Paischer (AUT)	Hiroaki Hiraoka (JPN)	Kisei Akimoto (JPN)
Extra-lightweight (−60 kg)	Ludwig Paischer (AUT)	Hiroaki Hiraoka (JPN)	Arsen Galstyan (RUS)
Half-lightweight (−66 kg)	Alim Gadanov (RUS)	Khashbaataryn Tsagaanbaatar (MGL)	David Larose (FRA)
Half-lightweight (−66 kg)	Alim Gadanov (RUS)	Khashbaataryn Tsagaanbaatar (MGL)	Musa Mogushkov (RUS)
Lightweight (−73 kg)	Dirk Van Tichelt (BEL)	Leandro Guilheiro (BRA)	Mansur Isaev (RUS)
Lightweight (−73 kg)	Dirk Van Tichelt (BEL)	Leandro Guilheiro (BRA)	Yoel Razvozov (ISR)
Half-middleweight (−81 kg)	Ivan Nifontov (RUS)	Nacif Elias (BRA)	Masahiko Tomouchi (JPN)
Half-middleweight (−81 kg)	Ivan Nifontov (RUS)	Nacif Elias (BRA)	Travis Stevens (USA)
Middleweight (−90 kg)	Kirill Denisov (RUS)	Hugo Pessanha (BRA)	Tiago Camilo (BRA)
Middleweight (−90 kg)	Kirill Denisov (RUS)	Hugo Pessanha (BRA)	Eduardo Santos (BRA)
Half-heavyweight (−100 kg)	Elco van der Geest (NED)	Luciano Corrêa (BRA)	Thierry Fabre (FRA)
Half-heavyweight (−100 kg)	Elco van der Geest (NED)	Luciano Corrêa (BRA)	Askhab Kostoev (RUS)
Heavyweight (+100 kg)	Daniel Hernandes (BRA)	Hiroki Tachiyama (JPN)	Pierre Robin (FRA)
Heavyweight (+100 kg)	Daniel Hernandes (BRA)	Hiroki Tachiyama (JPN)	Yasuyuki Muneta (JPN)

=== Women's events ===
Event	Gold	Silver	Bronze
Extra-lightweight (−48 kg)	Frédérique Jossinet (FRA)	Emi Yamagishi (JPN)	Sarah Menezes (BRA)
Extra-lightweight (−48 kg)	Frédérique Jossinet (FRA)	Emi Yamagishi (JPN)	Paula Pareto (ARG)
Half-lightweight (−52 kg)	Yuka Nishida (JPN)	Audrey La Rizza (FRA)	Ilse Heylen (BEL)
Half-lightweight (−52 kg)	Yuka Nishida (JPN)	Audrey La Rizza (FRA)	Érika Miranda (BRA)
Lightweight (−57 kg)	Telma Monteiro (POR)	Nae Udaka (JPN)	Sabrina Filzmoser (AUT)
Lightweight (−57 kg)	Telma Monteiro (POR)	Nae Udaka (JPN)	Rafaela Silva (BRA)
Half-middleweight (−63 kg)	Claudia Malzahn (GER)	Anicka van Emden (NED)	Claudia Ahrens (GER)
Half-middleweight (−63 kg)	Claudia Malzahn (GER)	Anicka van Emden (NED)	Gévrise Émane (FRA)
Middleweight (−70 kg)	Lucie Décosse (FRA)	Kerstin Thiele (GER)	Yuri Alvear (COL)
Middleweight (−70 kg)	Lucie Décosse (FRA)	Kerstin Thiele (GER)	Edith Bosch (NED)
Half-heavyweight (−78 kg)	Céline Lebrun (FRA)	Stéphanie Possamaï (FRA)	Tomomi Okamura (JPN)
Half-heavyweight (−78 kg)	Céline Lebrun (FRA)	Stéphanie Possamaï (FRA)	Heide Wollert (GER)
Heavyweight (+78 kg)	Mika Sugimoto (JPN)	Carola Uilenhoed (NED)	Franziska Konitz (GER)
Heavyweight (+78 kg)	Mika Sugimoto (JPN)	Carola Uilenhoed (NED)	Melissa Mojica (PUR)

Source Results

=== Medal table ===
* Host nation (Brazil)

Rank	Nation	Gold	Silver	Bronze	Total
1	France (FRA)	3	2	4	9
2	Russia (RUS)	3	0	4	7
3	Japan (JPN)	2	4	4	10
4	Brazil (BRA)*	1	4	5	10
5	Netherlands (NED)	1	2	1	4
6	Germany (GER)	1	1	3	5
7	Austria (AUT)	1	0	1	2
7	Belgium (BEL)	1	0	1	2
9	Portugal (POR)	1	0	0	1
10	Mongolia (MGL)	0	1	0	1
11	Argentina (ARG)	0	0	1	1
11	Colombia (COL)	0	0	1	1
11	Israel (ISR)	0	0	1	1
11	Puerto Rico (PUR)	0	0	1	1
11	United States (USA)	0	0	1	1
Totals (15 entries)		14	14	28	56
