= Lucie Louette =

French judoka (born 1985)

Personal information
- Born: 15 February 1985 (age 41) Amiens, France
- Occupation: Judoka

Sport
- Country: France
- Sport: Judo
- Weight class: –78 kg, +78 kg

Achievements and titles
- World Champ.: R16 (2011)
- European Champ.: (gold) (2013)
Medal record
Women's judo
Representing France
European Championships
Gold medal – first place	2013 Budapest	–78 kg
Silver medal – second place	2011 Istanbul	–78 kg
Bronze medal – third place	2010 Vienna	–78 kg
Bronze medal – third place	2014 Montpellier	–78 kg
IJF Grand Slam
Gold medal – first place	2013 Paris	–78 kg
Silver medal – second place	2011 Paris	–78 kg
Bronze medal – third place	2010 Paris	–78 kg
Bronze medal – third place	2011 Moscow	–78 kg
Bronze medal – third place	2011 Rio de Janeiro	–78 kg
IJF Grand Prix
Silver medal – second place	2009 Qingdao	–78 kg
Silver medal – second place	2016 Havana	+78 kg
Bronze medal – third place	2011 Baku	–78 kg
Bronze medal – third place	2011 Qingdao	–78 kg
Bronze medal – third place	2013 Düsseldorf	–78 kg
European U23 Championships
Gold medal – first place	2005 Kyiv	–78 kg
Gold medal – first place	2007 Salzburg	–78 kg
World Juniors Championships
Bronze medal – third place	2004 Budapest	–78 kg
European Junior Championships
Bronze medal – third place	2002 Rotterdam	–78 kg
Summer Universiade
Bronze medal – third place	2007 Bangkok	–78 kg

Profile at external databases
- IJF: 1740
- JudoInside.com: 16601
- Updated on 18 June 2022

Lucie Louette-Kanning (born 15 February 1985) is a French retired judoka who competed at international judo competitions. She is a 2013 European champion, two-time European U23 champion, World Junior bronze medalist and Summer Universiade bronze medalist. She has also won the French national judo championships four times.

Louette Kanning narrowly missed qualifying for the 2008 Summer Olympics and 2012 Summer Olympics. Louette-Kanning retired from judo in 2016.
