= 2019 Judo Grand Slam Brasilia =

Judo competition

Judo 2019 Judo Grand Slam Brasília
- Venue: Centro Internacional de Convenções do Brasil
- Location: Brasília, Brazi
- Dates: 6–8 October 2019
- Competitors: 316 from 55 nations

Competition at external databases
- Links: IJF • EJU • JudoInside

The 2019 Judo Grand Slam Brasilia was held in Brasília, Brazil from 6 to 8 October 2019.

== Medal summary ==
=== Men's events ===
Event	Gold	Silver	Bronze
Extra-lightweight (−60 kg)	Allan Kuwabara (BRA)	Eric Takabatake (BRA)	Francisco Garrigós (ESP)
Extra-lightweight (−60 kg)	Allan Kuwabara (BRA)	Eric Takabatake (BRA)	Islam Yashuev (RUS)
Half-lightweight (−66 kg)	Daniel Cargnin (BRA)	Manuel Lombardo (ITA)	Kilian Le Blouch (FRA)
Half-lightweight (−66 kg)	Daniel Cargnin (BRA)	Manuel Lombardo (ITA)	Willian Lima (BRA)
Lightweight (−73 kg)	Musa Mogushkov (RUS)	David Lima (BRA)	Soichi Hashimoto (JPN)
Lightweight (−73 kg)	Musa Mogushkov (RUS)	David Lima (BRA)	Anthony Zingg (GER)
Half-middleweight (−81 kg)	Takanori Nagase (JPN)	Vedat Albayrak (TUR)	Anri Egutidze (POR)
Half-middleweight (−81 kg)	Takanori Nagase (JPN)	Vedat Albayrak (TUR)	Alan Khubetsov (RUS)
Middleweight (−90 kg)	Nikoloz Sherazadishvili (ESP)	Iván Felipe Silva Morales (CUB)	Nemanja Majdov (SRB)
Middleweight (−90 kg)	Nikoloz Sherazadishvili (ESP)	Iván Felipe Silva Morales (CUB)	Mihael Žgank (TUR)
Half-heavyweight (−100 kg)	Kentaro Iida (JPN)	Rafael Buzacarini (BRA)	Miklós Cirjenics (HUN)
Half-heavyweight (−100 kg)	Kentaro Iida (JPN)	Rafael Buzacarini (BRA)	Kirill Denisov (RUS)
Heavyweight (+100 kg)	Teddy Riner (FRA)	David Moura (BRA)	Lukáš Krpálek (CZE)
Heavyweight (+100 kg)	Teddy Riner (FRA)	David Moura (BRA)	Inal Tasoev (RUS)

=== Women's events ===
Event	Gold	Silver	Bronze
Extra-lightweight (−48 kg)	Catarina Costa (POR)	Gabriela Chibana (BRA)	Laura Martínez (ESP)
Extra-lightweight (−48 kg)	Catarina Costa (POR)	Gabriela Chibana (BRA)	Shira Rishony (ISR)
Half-lightweight (−52 kg)	Odette Giuffrida (ITA)	Larissa Pimenta (BRA)	Natsumi Tsunoda (JPN)
Half-lightweight (−52 kg)	Odette Giuffrida (ITA)	Larissa Pimenta (BRA)	Eleudis Valentim (BRA)
Lightweight (−57 kg)	Nekoda Smythe-Davis (GBR)	Ketelyn Nascimento (BRA)	Rafaela Silva (BRA)
Lightweight (−57 kg)	Nekoda Smythe-Davis (GBR)	Ketelyn Nascimento (BRA)	Theresa Stoll (GER)
Half-middleweight (−63 kg)	Ketleyn Quadros (BRA)	Alexia Castilhos (BRA)	Maylín del Toro Carvajal (CUB)
Half-middleweight (−63 kg)	Ketleyn Quadros (BRA)	Alexia Castilhos (BRA)	Amy Livesey (GBR)
Middleweight (−70 kg)	Yuri Alvear (COL)	Giovanna Scoccimarro (GER)	Gemma Howell (GBR)
Middleweight (−70 kg)	Yuri Alvear (COL)	Giovanna Scoccimarro (GER)	Maria Portela (BRA)
Half-heavyweight (−78 kg)	Kaliema Antomarchi (CUB)	Natalie Powell (GBR)	Audrey Tcheuméo (FRA)
Half-heavyweight (−78 kg)	Kaliema Antomarchi (CUB)	Natalie Powell (GBR)	Anna-Maria Wagner (GER)
Heavyweight (+78 kg)	Beatriz Souza (BRA)	Maria Suelen Altheman (BRA)	Rochele Nunes (POR)
Heavyweight (+78 kg)	Beatriz Souza (BRA)	Maria Suelen Altheman (BRA)	Julia Tolofua (FRA)

Source Results

=== Medal table ===
* Host nation (Brazil)

Rank	Nation	Gold	Silver	Bronze	Total
1	Brazil (BRA)*	4	9	4	17
2	Japan (JPN)	2	0	2	4
3	Great Britain (GBR)	1	1	2	4
4	Cuba (CUB)	1	1	1	3
5	Italy (ITA)	1	1	0	2
6	Russia (RUS)	1	0	4	5
7	France (FRA)	1	0	3	4
8	Portugal (POR)	1	0	2	3
8	Spain (ESP)	1	0	2	3
10	Colombia (COL)	1	0	0	1
11	Germany (GER)	0	1	3	4
12	Turkey (TUR)	0	1	1	2
13	Czech Republic (CZE)	0	0	1	1
13	Hungary (HUN)	0	0	1	1
13	Israel (ISR)	0	0	1	1
13	Serbia (SRB)	0	0	1	1
Totals (16 entries)		14	14	28	56
