= Judo at the 2015 European Games – Men's team =

Judo Men's team at the 2015 European Games
- Venue: Heydar Aliyev Arena
- Location: Baku, Azerbaijan
- Date: 28 June
- Nations: 10

Medalists
gold medal	Pierre Duprat; Alexandre Iddir; Loic Korval; David Larose; Cyrille Maret; Loic Pietri; Florent Urani	France
silver medal	Beka Gviniashvili; Varlam Liparteliani; Ushangi Margiani; Levani Matiashvili; Adam Okruashvili; Amiran Papinashvili; Lasha Shavdatuashvili; Nugzar Tatalashvili; Avtandili Tchrikishvili	Georgia
bronze medal	Serhiy Drebot; Vitalii Dudchyk; Oleksandr Gordiienko; Iakiv Khammo; Artem Khomula; Quedjau Nhabali; Vadym Synyavsky; Georgii Zantaraia	Ukraine
bronze medal	Kirill Denisov; Kamal Khan-Magomedov; Alan Khubetsov; Ivan Nifontov; Mikhail Pulyaev; Renat Saidov; Kirill Voprosov; Denis Yartsev	Russia

Champions
- Men's team: France (13th title)

Competition at external databases
- Links: JudoInside

The men's team judo event at the 2015 European Games in Baku was held on 28 June at the Heydar Aliyev Arena.

== Results ==
Round of 16
Ukraine	3
Slovenia	2
Czech Republic	4
Spain	1

Quarterfinals
Russia	4
Ukraine	1
France	4
Portugal	1
Georgia	5
Czech Republic	0
Germany	2
Hungary	3

Semifinals
Russia	1
France	4
Georgia	5
Hungary	0

Final
France	4
Georgia	1

Repechage

Repechage
Ukraine	3
Portugal	2

Third place
Ukraine	3
Hungary	2

Repechage
Czech Republic	1
Germany	4

Third place
Germany	2
Russia	3
