= Nataliya Kondratyeva =

Russian judoka (born 1986)

Personal information
- Native name: Наталья Владимировна Кондратьева
- Full name: Natalya Vladimirovna Kondratieva
- Born: 28 April 1986 (age 40) Samara, Russian SFSR, Soviet Union
- Occupation: Judoka

Sport
- Country: Russia
- Sport: Judo
- Weight class: –48 kg

Achievements and titles
- Olympic Games: R32 (2012)
- World Champ.: R64 (2010, 2011)
- European Champ.: 5th (2012)
Medal record
Women's judo
Representing Russia
IJF Grand Slam
Silver medal – second place	2011 Moscow	–48 kg
Silver medal – second place	2016 Tyumen	–48 kg
Bronze medal – third place	2010 Rio de Janeiro	–48 kg
Bronze medal – third place	2014 Baku	–48 kg
Bronze medal – third place	2015 Tokyo	–48 kg
IJF Grand Prix
Gold medal – first place	2014 Tbilisi	–48 kg
Bronze medal – third place	2009 Tunis	–48 kg
Bronze medal – third place	2015 Budapest	–48 kg
European U23 Championships
Bronze medal – third place	2007 Salzburg	–48 kg
Bronze medal – third place	2008 Zagreb	–48 kg
World Juniors Championships
Silver medal – second place	2004 Budapest	–48 kg
European Junior Championships
Bronze medal – third place	2004 Sofia	–48 kg
Bronze medal – third place	2005 Zagreb	–48 kg
European Cadet Championships
Gold medal – first place	2002 Győr	–40 kg
Summer Universiade
Silver medal – second place	2007 Bangkok	–48 kg

Profile at external databases
- IJF: 1961
- JudoInside.com: 25781
- Updated on 9 February 2022

Nataliya Vladimirovna Kondratyeva (Russian: Наталия Владимировна Кондратьева; born 28 April 1986) is a Russian judoka who competes in the women's 48 kg category. At the 2012 Summer Olympics, she was defeated in the first round.
