= Egidijus Žilinskas =

Lithuanian judoka (born 1986)

Personal information
- Born: 13 March 1986 (age 40)
- Occupation: Judoka

Sport
- Country: Lithuania
- Sport: Judo
- Weight class: –100 kg

Achievements and titles
- World Champ.: 9th (2007)
- European Champ.: 7th (2008)
Medal record
Men's judo
Representing Lithuania
European U23 Championships
Silver medal – second place	2006 Moscow	–100 kg
Silver medal – second place	2008 Zagreb	–100 kg
European Junior Championships
Gold medal – first place	2005 Zagreb	–100 kg

Profile at external databases
- IJF: 540
- JudoInside.com: 25773
- Updated on 2 February 2022

Egidijus Žilinskas (born 13 March 1986) is a Lithuanian judoka.

== Achievements ==
Year	Tournament	Place	Weight class
2008	European Championships	7th	Half heavyweight (100 kg)
2007	Universiade	3rd	Half heavyweight (100 kg)

Two silver medals in European championship u23 and one gold medal in European championship u21.
