= 2014 Judo Grand Prix Tbilisi =

Judo competition

Judo 2014 Judo Grand Prix Tbilisi
- Location: Tbilisi, Georgia
- Dates: 21–23 March 2014
- Competitors: 191 from 24 nations

Competition at external databases
- Links: IJF • JudoInside

The 2014 Judo Grand Prix Tbilisi was held in Tbilisi, Georgia from 21 to 23 March 2014.

== Medal summary ==
=== Men's events ===
Event	Gold	Silver	Bronze
Extra-lightweight (−60 kg)	Orkhan Safarov (AZE)	Yerkebulan Kossayev (KAZ)	Lukhumi Chkhvimiani (GEO)
Extra-lightweight (−60 kg)	Orkhan Safarov (AZE)	Yerkebulan Kossayev (KAZ)	Arsen Galstyan (RUS)
Half-lightweight (−66 kg)	Nijat Shikhalizada (AZE)	Georgii Zantaraia (UKR)	Batgerel Battsetseg (MGL)
Half-lightweight (−66 kg)	Nijat Shikhalizada (AZE)	Georgii Zantaraia (UKR)	Alim Gadanov (RUS)
Lightweight (−73 kg)	Nugzar Tatalashvili (GEO)	Lasha Shavdatuashvili (GEO)	Musa Mogushkov (RUS)
Lightweight (−73 kg)	Nugzar Tatalashvili (GEO)	Lasha Shavdatuashvili (GEO)	Zebeda Rekhviashvili (GEO)
Half-middleweight (−81 kg)	Avtandili Tchrikishvili (GEO)	Travis Stevens (USA)	Asaf Chen (ISR)
Half-middleweight (−81 kg)	Avtandili Tchrikishvili (GEO)	Travis Stevens (USA)	Ushangi Margiani (GEO)
Middleweight (−90 kg)	Zviad Gogotchuri (GEO)	Walter Facente (ITA)	Kirill Denisov (RUS)
Middleweight (−90 kg)	Zviad Gogotchuri (GEO)	Walter Facente (ITA)	Vadym Synyavsky (UKR)
Half-heavyweight (−100 kg)	Artem Bloshenko (UKR)	Ivan Remarenco (UAE)	Elmar Gasimov (AZE)
Half-heavyweight (−100 kg)	Artem Bloshenko (UKR)	Ivan Remarenco (UAE)	Javad Mahjoub (IRI)
Heavyweight (+100 kg)	Adam Okruashvili (GEO)	Anton Krivobokov (RUS)	Stanislav Bondarenko (UKR)
Heavyweight (+100 kg)	Adam Okruashvili (GEO)	Anton Krivobokov (RUS)	Levani Matiashvili (GEO)

=== Women's events ===
Event	Gold	Silver	Bronze
Extra-lightweight (−48 kg)	Nataliya Kondratyeva (RUS)	Maryna Cherniak (UKR)	Dilara Lokmanhekim (TUR)
Extra-lightweight (−48 kg)	Nataliya Kondratyeva (RUS)	Maryna Cherniak (UKR)	Amélie Rosseneu (ISR)
Half-lightweight (−52 kg)	Gili Cohen (ISR)	Rosalba Forciniti (ITA)	Natalia Kuziutina (RUS)
Half-lightweight (−52 kg)	Gili Cohen (ISR)	Rosalba Forciniti (ITA)	Tetiana Levytska-Shukvani (UKR)
Lightweight (−57 kg)	Irina Zabludina (RUS)	Jovana Rogić (SRB)	Kifayat Gasimova (AZE)
Lightweight (−57 kg)	Irina Zabludina (RUS)	Jovana Rogić (SRB)	Shushana Hevondian (UKR)
Half-middleweight (−63 kg)	Edwige Gwend (ITA)	Yarden Gerbi (ISR)	Nina Milošević (SLO)
Half-middleweight (−63 kg)	Edwige Gwend (ITA)	Yarden Gerbi (ISR)	Pari Surakatova (RUS)
Middleweight (−70 kg)	Barbara Matić (CRO)	Ekaterina Denisenkova (RUS)	Irina Gazieva (RUS)
Middleweight (−70 kg)	Barbara Matić (CRO)	Ekaterina Denisenkova (RUS)	Lior Wildikan (ISR)
Half-heavyweight (−78 kg)	Assunta Galeone (ITA)	Viktoriya Turks (UKR)	Ivana Maranić (CRO)
Half-heavyweight (−78 kg)	Assunta Galeone (ITA)	Viktoriya Turks (UKR)	Brigita Matić-Ljuba (CRO)
Heavyweight (+78 kg)	Gülşah Kocatürk (TUR)	Sandra Jablonskytė (LTU)	Ksenia Chibisova (RUS)
Heavyweight (+78 kg)	Gülşah Kocatürk (TUR)	Sandra Jablonskytė (LTU)	Mariya Shekerova (RUS)

Source Results

=== Medal table ===
* Host nation (Georgia)

Rank	Nation	Gold	Silver	Bronze	Total
1	Georgia (GEO)*	4	1	4	9
2	Russia (RUS)	2	2	9	13
3	Italy (ITA)	2	2	0	4
4	Azerbaijan (AZE)	2	0	2	4
5	Ukraine (UKR)	1	3	4	8
6	Israel (ISR)	1	1	3	5
7	Croatia (CRO)	1	0	2	3
8	Turkey (TUR)	1	0	1	2
9	Kazakhstan (KAZ)	0	1	0	1
9	Lithuania (LTU)	0	1	0	1
9	Serbia (SRB)	0	1	0	1
9	United Arab Emirates (UAE)	0	1	0	1
9	United States (USA)	0	1	0	1
14	Iran (IRI)	0	0	1	1
14	Mongolia (MGL)	0	0	1	1
14	Slovenia (SLO)	0	0	1	1
Totals (16 entries)		14	14	28	56
