= Park Ka-yeon =

South Korean judoka (born 1986)

Personal information
- Born: 28 January 1986 (age 40)
- Occupation: Judoka
- Height: 1.70 m (5 ft 7 in)

Korean name
- Hangul: 박가연
- RR: Bak Gayeon
- MR: Pak Kayŏn

Sport
- Country: South Korea
- Sport: Judo
- Weight class: ‍–‍70 kg

Achievements and titles
- Olympic Games: 13th (2008)
- Asian Champ.: (silver) (2008)
Medal record
Women's judo
Representing South Korea
Asian Championships
Silver medal – second place	2008 Jeju	‍–‍70 kg
World Juniors Championships
Bronze medal – third place	2004 Budapest	‍–‍70 kg
Asian Junior Championships
Silver medal – second place	2005 Beirut	‍–‍70 kg
Summer Universiade
Silver medal – second place	2007 Bangkok	‍–‍70 kg

Profile at external databases
- IJF: 4069
- JudoInside.com: 34931
- Updated on 11 January 2023

Park Ka-yeon (Korean: 박가연; born 28 January 1986) is a South Korean judoka, who played for the middleweight category. She won two silver medals for her division at the 2007 Summer Universiade in Bangkok, Thailand, and at the 2008 Asian Judo Championships in Jeju City.

Park represented South Korea at the 2008 Summer Olympics in Beijing, where she competed for the women's 70 kg class. She lost the first preliminary round match, by an ippon and a kami-shiho-gatame (circling bridge or rollover), to Japan's Masae Ueno. Because her opponent advanced further into the final match, Park offered another shot for the bronze medal by entering the repechage rounds. She was defeated in her first match by China's Wang Juan, who successfully scored a yuko and a kosoto gake (small outer hook), at the end of the five-minute period.
