= 2006 European U23 Judo Championships =

Judo competition

Judo 2006 European U23 Judo Championships
- Location: Moscow, Russia
- Dates: 25–25 November 2006

Competition at external databases
- Links: JudoInside

The 2006 European U23 Judo Championships is an edition of the European U23 Judo Championships, organised by the International Judo Federation. It was held in Moscow, Russia from 25 to 25 November 2006.

== Medal summary ==
=== Medal table ===
* Host nation (Russia)

| Rank | Nation | Gold | Silver | Bronze | Total |
|---|---|---|---|---|---|
| 1 | Netherlands (NED) | 3 | 1 | 1 | 5 |
| 2 | Russia (RUS)* | 2 | 2 | 5 | 9 |
| 3 | Hungary (HUN) | 2 | 2 | 3 | 7 |
| 4 | Portugal (POR) | 2 | 0 | 0 | 2 |
| 5 | Germany (GER) | 1 | 2 | 3 | 6 |
| 6 | France (FRA) | 1 | 0 | 4 | 5 |
| 7 | Greece (GRE) | 1 | 0 | 1 | 2 |
| 7 | Poland (POL) | 1 | 0 | 1 | 2 |
| 7 | Romania (ROU) | 1 | 0 | 1 | 2 |
| 10 | Belarus (BLR) | 0 | 1 | 3 | 4 |
| 11 | Spain (ESP) | 0 | 1 | 1 | 2 |
| 12 | Belgium (BEL) | 0 | 1 | 0 | 1 |
| 12 | Czech Republic (CZE) | 0 | 1 | 0 | 1 |
| 12 | Finland (FIN) | 0 | 1 | 0 | 1 |
| 12 | Lithuania (LTU) | 0 | 1 | 0 | 1 |
| 12 | Montenegro (MNE) | 0 | 1 | 0 | 1 |
| 17 | Switzerland (SUI) | 0 | 0 | 2 | 2 |
| 18 | Austria (AUT) | 0 | 0 | 1 | 1 |
| 18 | Azerbaijan (AZE) | 0 | 0 | 1 | 1 |
| 18 | Great Britain (GBR) | 0 | 0 | 1 | 1 |
| Totals (20 entries) | | 14 | 14 | 28 | 56 |

=== Men's events ===
| Event | Gold | Silver | Bronze |
|---|---|---|---|
| Extra-lightweight (−60 kg) | Shamil Nash (RUS) | Jeroen Mooren (NED) | Ludovic Chammartin (SUI) |
| Extra-lightweight (−60 kg) | Shamil Nash (RUS) | Jeroen Mooren (NED) | László Burján (HUN) |
| Half-lightweight (−66 kg) | Dan Fâșie (ROU) | Jonas Focke (GER) | Revazi Zintiridis (GRE) |
| Half-lightweight (−66 kg) | Dan Fâșie (ROU) | Jonas Focke (GER) | Sugoi Uriarte (ESP) |
| Lightweight (−73 kg) | Johann Etienne (FRA) | Dirk Van Tichelt (BEL) | Tom Reed (GBR) |
| Lightweight (−73 kg) | Johann Etienne (FRA) | Dirk Van Tichelt (BEL) | Aleksander Burylov (RUS) |
| Half-middleweight (−81 kg) | Nick Hein (GER) | Srđan Mrvaljević (MNE) | Erekle Kopaliani (RUS) |
| Half-middleweight (−81 kg) | Nick Hein (GER) | Srđan Mrvaljević (MNE) | Tijke van de Loo (NED) |
| Middleweight (−90 kg) | Krzysztof Węglarz (POL) | Jorge Rigueira (ESP) | Yauhen Biadulin (BLR) |
| Middleweight (−90 kg) | Krzysztof Węglarz (POL) | Jorge Rigueira (ESP) | Tagir Khaybulaev (RUS) |
| Half-heavyweight (−100 kg) | Ilias Iliadis (GRE) | Egidijus Žilinskas (LTU) | Benjamin Behrla (GER) |
| Half-heavyweight (−100 kg) | Ilias Iliadis (GRE) | Egidijus Žilinskas (LTU) | Askhab Kostoev (RUS) |
| Heavyweight (+100 kg) | Barna Bor (HUN) | Aleksey Gladkov (RUS) | Jean-Sébastien Bonvoisin (FRA) |
| Heavyweight (+100 kg) | Barna Bor (HUN) | Aleksey Gladkov (RUS) | Yauheni Kavalevski (BLR) |

=== Women's events ===
| Event | Gold | Silver | Bronze |
|---|---|---|---|
| Extra-lightweight (−48 kg) | Éva Csernoviczki (HUN) | Wasilisa Prill (GER) | Emilie Lafont (FRA) |
| Extra-lightweight (−48 kg) | Éva Csernoviczki (HUN) | Wasilisa Prill (GER) | Katsiaryna Razumava (BLR) |
| Half-lightweight (−52 kg) | Telma Monteiro (POR) | Anna Kharitonova (RUS) | Frédérique Schmitt (FRA) |
| Half-lightweight (−52 kg) | Telma Monteiro (POR) | Anna Kharitonova (RUS) | Ilona Perge (HUN) |
| Lightweight (−57 kg) | Arina Pchelintseva (RUS) | Nina Koivumäki (FIN) | Bernadett Baczkó (HUN) |
| Lightweight (−57 kg) | Arina Pchelintseva (RUS) | Nina Koivumäki (FIN) | Ramila Yusubova (AZE) |
| Half-middleweight (−63 kg) | Margot Wetzer (NED) | Brigitta Szabó (HUN) | Aranka Schauer (AUT) |
| Half-middleweight (−63 kg) | Margot Wetzer (NED) | Brigitta Szabó (HUN) | Samantha Hari (SUI) |
| Middleweight (−70 kg) | Ana Cachola (POR) | Anett Mészáros (HUN) | Magali Leguay (FRA) |
| Middleweight (−70 kg) | Ana Cachola (POR) | Anett Mészáros (HUN) | Elisabeth Greve (GER) |
| Half-heavyweight (−78 kg) | Marhinde Verkerk (NED) | Alena Eiglova (CZE) | Julia Basler (GER) |
| Half-heavyweight (−78 kg) | Marhinde Verkerk (NED) | Alena Eiglova (CZE) | Alina Croitoru (ROU) |
| Heavyweight (+78 kg) | Carola Uilenhoed (NED) | Yuliya Barysik (BLR) | Natalia Sokolova (RUS) |
| Heavyweight (+78 kg) | Carola Uilenhoed (NED) | Yuliya Barysik (BLR) | Marzena Makula (POL) |

Source Results
