= Carola Uilenhoed =

Dutch judoka (born 1984)

Personal information
- Full name: Carola Constantina Uilenhoed
- Born: 10 October 1984 (age 41) The Hague, Netherlands
- Occupation: Judoka

Sport
- Country: Netherlands
- Sport: Judo
- Weight class: +78 kg

Achievements and titles
- Olympic Games: R16 (2008)
- World Champ.: (bronze) (2005, 2007)
- European Champ.: (silver) (2006, 2007)
Medal record
Women's judo
Representing the Netherlands
World Championships
Bronze medal – third place	2005 Cairo	Open
Bronze medal – third place	2007 Rio de Janeiro	+78 kg
European Championships
Silver medal – second place	2006 Tampere	+78 kg
Silver medal – second place	2007 Belgrade	+78 kg
IJF Grand Slam
Silver medal – second place	2009 Rio de Janeiro	+78 kg
European U23 Championships
Gold medal – first place	2006 Moscow	+78 kg
Bronze medal – third place	2005 Kyiv	+78 kg
European Junior Championships
Bronze medal – third place	2002 Rotterdam	+78 kg

Profile at external databases
- IJF: 291
- JudoInside.com: 9362
- Updated on 16 November 2022

Carola Constantina Uilenhoed (born 10 October 1984 in The Hague) is a Dutch judoka.

== Achievements ==
Year	Tournament	Place	Weight class
2007	World Championships	3rd	Heavyweight (+78 kg)
2007	European Championships	2nd	Heavyweight (+78 kg)
2006	European Championships	2nd	Heavyweight (+78 kg)
2005	World Championships	5th	Heavyweight (+78 kg)
2005	World Championships	3rd	Open class
2005	European Championships	7th	Heavyweight (+78 kg)
