= 2011 Judo Grand Slam Rio de Janeiro =

Judo competition

Judo 2011 Judo Grand Slam Rio de Janeiro
- Location: Rio de Janeiro, Brazil
- Dates: 18–19 June 2011
- Competitors: 333 from 55 nations

Competition at external databases
- Links: IJF • JudoInside

The 2011 Judo Grand Slam Rio de Janeiro was held in Rio de Janeiro, Brazil from 18 to 19 June 2011.

== Medal summary ==
=== Men's events ===
Event	Gold	Silver	Bronze
Extra-lightweight (−60 kg)	Hirofumi Yamamoto (JPN)	Elio Verde (ITA)	Hiroaki Hiraoka (JPN)
Extra-lightweight (−60 kg)	Hirofumi Yamamoto (JPN)	Elio Verde (ITA)	Sofiane Milous (FRA)
Half-lightweight (−66 kg)	Musa Mogushkov (RUS)	Sugoi Uriarte (ESP)	Masashi Ebinuma (JPN)
Half-lightweight (−66 kg)	Musa Mogushkov (RUS)	Sugoi Uriarte (ESP)	David Larose (FRA)
Lightweight (−73 kg)	Riki Nakaya (JPN)	João Pina (POR)	Costel Danculea (ROU)
Lightweight (−73 kg)	Riki Nakaya (JPN)	João Pina (POR)	Murat Kodzokov (RUS)
Half-middleweight (−81 kg)	Leandro Guilheiro (BRA)	Ivan Nifontov (RUS)	Sirazhudin Magomedov (RUS)
Half-middleweight (−81 kg)	Leandro Guilheiro (BRA)	Ivan Nifontov (RUS)	Elnur Mammadli (AZE)
Middleweight (−90 kg)	Takashi Ono (JPN)	Asley González (CUB)	Tiago Camilo (BRA)
Middleweight (−90 kg)	Takashi Ono (JPN)	Asley González (CUB)	Hugo Pessanha (BRA)
Half-heavyweight (−100 kg)	Takamasa Anai (JPN)	Sergei Samoilovich (RUS)	Thierry Fabre (FRA)
Half-heavyweight (−100 kg)	Takamasa Anai (JPN)	Sergei Samoilovich (RUS)	Elco van der Geest (BEL)
Heavyweight (+100 kg)	João Schlittler (BRA)	Daniel Hernandes (BRA)	Barna Bor (HUN)
Heavyweight (+100 kg)	João Schlittler (BRA)	Daniel Hernandes (BRA)	Janusz Wojnarowicz (POL)

=== Women's events ===
Event	Gold	Silver	Bronze
Extra-lightweight (−48 kg)	Haruna Asami (JPN)	Sarah Menezes (BRA)	Charline Van Snick (BEL)
Extra-lightweight (−48 kg)	Haruna Asami (JPN)	Sarah Menezes (BRA)	Éva Csernoviczki (HUN)
Half-lightweight (−52 kg)	Érika Miranda (BRA)	Rosalba Forciniti (ITA)	Pénélope Bonna (FRA)
Half-lightweight (−52 kg)	Érika Miranda (BRA)	Rosalba Forciniti (ITA)	Laura Gómez (ESP)
Lightweight (−57 kg)	Corina Căprioriu (ROU)	Rafaela Silva (BRA)	Automne Pavia (FRA)
Lightweight (−57 kg)	Corina Căprioriu (ROU)	Rafaela Silva (BRA)	Morgane Ribout (FRA)
Half-middleweight (−63 kg)	Kana Abe (JPN)	Gévrise Émane (FRA)	Maricet Espinosa (CUB)
Half-middleweight (−63 kg)	Kana Abe (JPN)	Gévrise Émane (FRA)	Elisabeth Willeboordse (NED)
Middleweight (−70 kg)	Yoriko Kunihara (JPN)	Yuri Alvear (COL)	Maria Portela (BRA)
Middleweight (−70 kg)	Yoriko Kunihara (JPN)	Yuri Alvear (COL)	Kelita Zupancic (CAN)
Half-heavyweight (−78 kg)	Mayra Aguiar (BRA)	Kayla Harrison (USA)	Lucie Louette (FRA)
Half-heavyweight (−78 kg)	Mayra Aguiar (BRA)	Kayla Harrison (USA)	Audrey Tcheuméo (FRA)
Heavyweight (+78 kg)	Megumi Tachimoto (JPN)	Gülşah Kocatürk (TUR)	Rochele Nunes (BRA)
Heavyweight (+78 kg)	Megumi Tachimoto (JPN)	Gülşah Kocatürk (TUR)	Vanessa Zambotti (MEX)

Source Results

=== Medal table ===
* Host nation (Brazil)

Rank	Nation	Gold	Silver	Bronze	Total
1	Japan (JPN)	8	0	2	10
2	Brazil (BRA)*	4	3	4	11
3	Russia (RUS)	1	2	2	5
4	Romania (ROU)	1	0	1	2
5	Italy (ITA)	0	2	0	2
6	France (FRA)	0	1	8	9
7	Cuba (CUB)	0	1	1	2
7	Spain (ESP)	0	1	1	2
9	Colombia (COL)	0	1	0	1
9	Portugal (POR)	0	1	0	1
9	Turkey (TUR)	0	1	0	1
9	United States (USA)	0	1	0	1
13	Belgium (BEL)	0	0	2	2
13	Hungary (HUN)	0	0	2	2
15	Azerbaijan (AZE)	0	0	1	1
15	Canada (CAN)	0	0	1	1
15	Mexico (MEX)	0	0	1	1
15	Netherlands (NED)	0	0	1	1
15	Poland (POL)	0	0	1	1
Totals (19 entries)		14	14	28	56
