= László Burján =

Hungarian judoka (born 1985)

Personal information
- Born: 10 March 1985 (age 41)
- Occupation: Judoka

Sport
- Country: Hungary
- Sport: Judo
- Weight class: ‍–‍60 kg

Achievements and titles
- World Champ.: R16 (2009, 2010)
- European Champ.: 7th (2004, 2007)
Medal record
Men's judo
Representing Hungary
European U23 Championships
Gold medal – first place	2007 Salzburg	‍–‍60 kg
Bronze medal – third place	2006 Moscow	‍–‍60 kg
World Juniors Championships
Silver medal – second place	2004 Budapest	‍–‍60 kg

Profile at external databases
- IJF: 237
- JudoInside.com: 1250
- Updated on 11 January 2023

László Burján (born 10 March 1985) is a Hungarian judoka.

== Achievements ==
Year	Tournament	Place	Weight class
2007	European Judo Championships	7th	Extra lightweight (60 kg)
2004	European Judo Championships	7th	Extra lightweight (60 kg)
