= Judo at the 2007 Summer Universiade =

Judo competition

Judo Judo at the 2007 Summer Universiade
- Location: Bangkok, Thailand
- Dates: 13–16 August 2007

Medalists
gold medal	Japan (5th title)
silver medal	South Korea
bronze medal	China

Champions
- Men's team: Japan (3rd title)
- Women's team: Japan (2nd title)

Competition at external databases
- Links: JudoInside

The Judo competition in the 2007 Summer Universiade were held in Bangkok, Thailand from 13 to 16 August 2007.

== Medal overview ==
=== Men's event ===
Event	Gold	Silver	Bronze
Extra-lightweight (60 kg)	Cho Nam-suk (KOR)	Maksym Korotun (UKR)	Mostafa Dalirian (IRI)
Extra-lightweight (60 kg)	Cho Nam-suk (KOR)	Maksym Korotun (UKR)	Nazir Kishmakov (RUS)
Half-lightweight (66 kg)	Ramil Gasimov (AZE)	Sugoi Uriarte (ESP)	Alessandro Bruyere (ITA)
Half-lightweight (66 kg)	Ramil Gasimov (AZE)	Sugoi Uriarte (ESP)	Armen Nazaryan (ARM)
Lightweight (73 kg)	Masahiko Otsuka (JPN)	Kim Jae-bum (KOR)	Baitraz Kaitmazov (RUS)
Lightweight (73 kg)	Masahiko Otsuka (JPN)	Kim Jae-bum (KOR)	Sergiu Toma (MDA)
Half-middleweight (81 kg)	Grigol Shinjikashvili (GEO)	Kim Min-kyu (KOR)	Hirotaka Kato (JPN)
Half-middleweight (81 kg)	Grigol Shinjikashvili (GEO)	Kim Min-kyu (KOR)	Farmon Kabulov (UZB)
Middleweight (90 kg)	Khurshid Nabiev (UZB)	Nicolas Brisson (FRA)	Karolis Bauza (LTU)
Middleweight (90 kg)	Khurshid Nabiev (UZB)	Nicolas Brisson (FRA)	Dmitrij Gerasimenko (RUS)
Half-heavyweight (100 kg)	Takamasa Anai (JPN)	Franck Moussima (CMR)	Kim Jung-hoon (KOR)
Half-heavyweight (100 kg)	Takamasa Anai (JPN)	Franck Moussima (CMR)	Egidijus Žilinskas (LTU)
Heavyweight (+100 kg)	Kim Sung-bum (KOR)	Dmitry Sterkhov (RUS)	Saeid Khosravinejad (IRI)
Heavyweight (+100 kg)	Kim Sung-bum (KOR)	Dmitry Sterkhov (RUS)	Yerbolat Yussupov (KAZ)
Openweight	Satoshi Ishii (JPN)	Aleksandar Petković (SRB)	Vitaliy Polyanskyy (UKR)
Openweight	Satoshi Ishii (JPN)	Aleksandar Petković (SRB)	Adam Okroashvili (GEO)
Team	Japan; Satoshi Ishii; Shinya Katabuchi; Takamasa Anai; Hirotaka Kato; Masahiko Otsuka; Toshiaki Umetsu; Hiroaki Hiraoka; Mai Tateyama	France; Jeremy Cadoux Duc; Jordan Amoros; Frédéric Lecanu; Thierry Fabre; Mickael Remilien; Antoine Jeannin; Jerome Wustner; Nicolas Brisson	Russia; Dmitrij Gerasimenko; Batradz Kaytmazov; Askhab Kostoev; Aleksey Gladkov; Ivan Nifontov; Dmitry Sterkhov; Nazir Kishmakhov; Mansur Isaev
Team	Japan; Satoshi Ishii; Shinya Katabuchi; Takamasa Anai; Hirotaka Kato; Masahiko Otsuka; Toshiaki Umetsu; Hiroaki Hiraoka; Mai Tateyama	France; Jeremy Cadoux Duc; Jordan Amoros; Frédéric Lecanu; Thierry Fabre; Mickael Remilien; Antoine Jeannin; Jerome Wustner; Nicolas Brisson	South Korea; Cho Nam-suk; Kim Kwang-sub; Kim Jae-bum; Kim Min-kyu; Choi Cheon; Kim Jung-hoon; Kim Sung-bum; Baeg Chul-sung

=== Women's event ===
Event	Gold	Silver	Bronze
Extra-lightweight (48 kg)	Tomoko Fukumi (JPN)	Natalia Kondratieva (RUS)	Séverine Pesch (GER)
Extra-lightweight (48 kg)	Tomoko Fukumi (JPN)	Natalia Kondratieva (RUS)	Meriem Moussa (ALG)
Half-lightweight (52 kg)	Mönkhbaataryn Bundmaa (MGL)	Lee Jee-hae (KOR)	Iwona Machalek (POL)
Half-lightweight (52 kg)	Mönkhbaataryn Bundmaa (MGL)	Lee Jee-hae (KOR)	Anush Hakobyan (ARM)
Lightweight (57 kg)	Nae Udaka (JPN)	Yahaira Aguirre (ESP)	Choe Kyong-Sil (PRK)
Lightweight (57 kg)	Nae Udaka (JPN)	Yahaira Aguirre (ESP)	Kim Mee-hwa (KOR)
Half-middleweight (63 kg)	Emmanuelle Payet (FRA)	Wang Chin-Fang (TPE)	Hilde Drexler (AUT)
Half-middleweight (63 kg)	Emmanuelle Payet (FRA)	Wang Chin-Fang (TPE)	Marta Labazina (RUS)
Middleweight (70 kg)	Yoriko Kunihara (JPN)	Park Ka-Yeon (KOR)	Catherine Roberge (CAN)
Middleweight (70 kg)	Yoriko Kunihara (JPN)	Park Ka-Yeon (KOR)	Erica Barbieri (ITA)
Half-heavyweight (78 kg)	Sayaka Anai (JPN)	Lee So-yeon (KOR)	Lucie Louette (FRA)
Half-heavyweight (78 kg)	Sayaka Anai (JPN)	Lee So-yeon (KOR)	Marylise Lévesque (CAN)
Heavyweight (+78 kg)	Wen Tong (CHN)	Belkıs Zehra Kaya (TUR)	Natalia Sokolova (RUS)
Heavyweight (+78 kg)	Wen Tong (CHN)	Belkıs Zehra Kaya (TUR)	Mika Sugimoto (JPN)
Openweight	Liu Huanyuan (CHN)	Lee Jung-eun (KOR)	Sedrine Portet (FRA)
Openweight	Liu Huanyuan (CHN)	Lee Jung-eun (KOR)	Mai Tateyama (JPN)
Team	Japan; Mika Sugimoto; Sayaka Anai; Yoriko Kunihara; Moe Kawasaki; Nae Udaka; Tomoko Fukumi; Nozomi Hirai; Mai Tateyama	France; Lucie Louette; Delphine Delsalle; Émilie Andéol; Laëtitia Payet; Sarah Loko; Emmanuelle Payet; Sandrine Portet; Magali Leguay	South Korea; Jung Ji-sun; Kim Mee-hwa; Lee Je-hee; You Mee-won; Lee So-yeon; Jung Ji-won; Lee Jung-eun; Park Ka-yeon
Team	Japan; Mika Sugimoto; Sayaka Anai; Yoriko Kunihara; Moe Kawasaki; Nae Udaka; Tomoko Fukumi; Nozomi Hirai; Mai Tateyama	France; Lucie Louette; Delphine Delsalle; Émilie Andéol; Laëtitia Payet; Sarah Loko; Emmanuelle Payet; Sandrine Portet; Magali Leguay	Russia; Irina Zabludina; Nataly Sokolova; Natalia Kondratieva; Marta Labazina; Natalia Burova; Flora Mkhitaryan; Alana Kanteeva; Liudmila Alparova

=== Medals table ===
Rank	Nation	Gold	Silver	Bronze	Total
1	Japan (JPN)	7	0	3	10
2	South Korea (KOR)	2	6	2	10
3	China (CHN)	2	0	0	2
4	France (FRA)	1	1	2	4
5	Georgia (GEO)	1	0	1	2
5	Uzbekistan (UZB)	1	0	1	2
7	Azerbaijan (AZE)	1	0	0	1
7	Mongolia (MGL)	1	0	0	1
9	Russia (RUS)	0	2	5	7
10	Spain (ESP)	0	2	0	2
11	Ukraine (UKR)	0	1	1	2
12	Cameroon (CMR)	0	1	0	1
12	Chinese Taipei (TPE)	0	1	0	1
12	Serbia (SRB)	0	1	0	1
12	Turkey (TUR)	0	1	0	1
16	Armenia (ARM)	0	0	2	2
16	Canada (CAN)	0	0	2	2
16	Iran (IRN)	0	0	2	2
16	Italy (ITA)	0	0	2	2
16	Lithuania (LTU)	0	0	2	2
21	Algeria (ALG)	0	0	1	1
21	Austria (AUT)	0	0	1	1
21	Germany (GER)	0	0	1	1
21	Kazakhstan (KAZ)	0	0	1	1
21	Moldova (MDA)	0	0	1	1
21	North Korea (PRK)	0	0	1	1
21	Poland (POL)	0	0	1	1
Totals (27 entries)		16	16	32	64
