= 2013 World Judo Championships – Men's team =

Judo competition

Judo Men's team at the 2013 World Judo Championships
- Venue: Ginásio do Maracanãzinho
- Location: Rio de Janeiro, Brazil
- Date: 1 September
- Competitors: 118 from 14 nations

Medalists
gold medal	Georgia (3rd title)
silver medal	Russia
bronze medal	Japan
bronze medal	Germany

Competition at external databases
- Links: IJF • JudoInside

The men's team competition of the 2013 World Judo Championships was held on September 1.

== Medalists ==
Gold	Silver	Bronze
Georgia; Lasha Shavdatuashvili; Amiran Papinashvili; Zebeda Rekhviashvili; Avtandil Tchrikishvili; Varlam Liparteliani; Adam Okruashvili	Russia; Alim Gadanov; Denis Yartsev; Murat Kodzokov; Sirazhudin Magomedov; Ivan Nifontov; Kirill Denisov; Yuri Panasenkov; Alexander Mikhaylin; Renat Saidov	Japan; Masaaki Fukuoka; Shohei Ono; Keita Nagashima; Masashi Nishiyama; Ryu Shichinohe Germany; Sebastian Seidl; Tobias Englmaier; Igor Wandtke; Sven Maresch; Marc Odenthal; Dimitri Peters
