= Tomislav Marijanović =

Croatian judoka (born 1981)

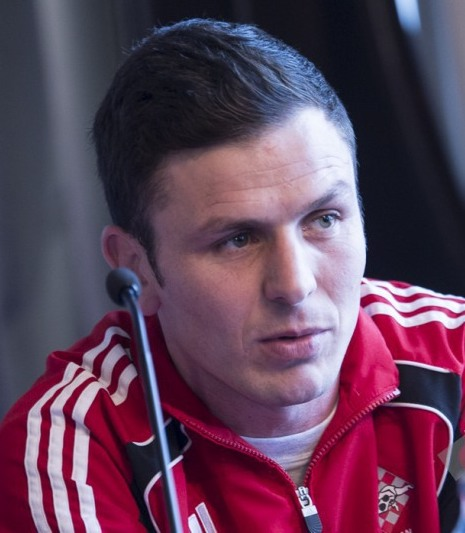

Personal information
- Born: 30 August 1981 (age 44)
- Occupation: Judoka

Sport
- Country: Croatia
- Sport: Judo
- Weight class: ‍–‍81 kg

Achievements and titles
- Olympic Games: R32 (2012)
- World Champ.: 7th (2007)
- European Champ.: (silver) (2013)
Medal record
Men's judo
Representing Croatia
European Championships
Silver medal – second place	2013 Budapest	‍–‍81 kg
IJF Grand Slam
Gold medal – first place	2010 Rio de Janeiro	‍–‍81 kg
Bronze medal – third place	2012 Moscow	‍–‍81 kg
IJF Grand Prix
Bronze medal – third place	2010 Qingdao	‍–‍81 kg
Mediterranean Games
Bronze medal – third place	2013 Mersin	‍–‍81 kg

Profile at external databases
- IJF: 569
- JudoInside.com: 17856
- Updated on 14 November 2022

Tomislav Marijanović (born 30 August 1981) is a Croatian judoka.

Marijanović placed 7th at the 2007 World Judo Championships in Brazil. He won a gold medal at the 2010 Rio de Janeiro Grand Slam. Marijanović has 12 gold medals from national senior championships (1998–2010, except 2004 when he finished 2nd). He trains in Croatian judo club "Student".

== Achievements ==
Year	Tournament	Place	Weight class
2013	European Judo Championships	2nd	Half middleweight (81 kg)
2007	World Judo Championships	7th	Half middleweight (81 kg)
2010	IJF Grand Slam	1st	Half middleweight (81 kg)
2010	IJF Grand Prix	5th	Half middleweight (81 kg)
2010	IJF Grand Prix	3rd	Half middleweight (81 kg)
2011	EJU European Cup	1st	Half middleweight (81 kg)
