= Takashi Ono (judoka) =

Japanese judoka (born 1980)

Personal information
- Born: 25 June 1980 (age 46)
- Occupation: Judoka

Sport
- Country: Japan
- Sport: Judo
- Weight class: ‍–‍81 kg, ‍–‍90 kg, ‍–‍100 kg
- Rank: 6th dan black belt

Achievements and titles
- Olympic Games: R32 (2008)
- World Champ.: (bronze) (2005, 2011)
- Asian Champ.: (gold) (2005, 2010)
Medal record
Men's judo
Representing Japan
World Championships
| Bronze medal – third place | 2005 Cairo | ‍–‍81 kg |
| Bronze medal – third place | 2011 Paris | ‍–‍90 kg |
Asian Games
| Gold medal – first place | 2010 Guangzhou | ‍–‍90 kg |
| Bronze medal – third place | 2006 Doha | ‍–‍81 kg |
Asian Championships
| Gold medal – first place | 2005 Tashkent | ‍–‍81 kg |
| Bronze medal – third place | 2001 Ulaanbaatar | ‍–‍81 kg |
| Bronze medal – third place | 2003 Jeju | ‍–‍81 kg |
| Bronze medal – third place | 2007 Kuwait City | ‍–‍81 kg |
| Bronze medal – third place | 2008 Jeju | ‍–‍81 kg |
World Masters
| Gold medal – first place | 2010 Suwon | ‍–‍90 kg |
| Bronze medal – third place | 2011 Baku | ‍–‍90 kg |
IJF Grand Slam
| Gold medal – first place | 2008 Tokyo | ‍–‍90 kg |
| Gold medal – first place | 2009 Moscow | ‍–‍90 kg |
| Gold medal – first place | 2009 Tokyo | ‍–‍90 kg |
| Gold medal – first place | 2010 Paris | ‍–‍90 kg |
| Gold medal – first place | 2010 Moscow | ‍–‍90 kg |
| Gold medal – first place | 2011 Rio de Janeiro | ‍–‍90 kg |
| Silver medal – second place | 2009 Paris | ‍–‍90 kg |
IJF Grand Prix
| Gold medal – first place | 2010 Tunis | ‍–‍90 kg |
| Silver medal – second place | 2013 Düsseldorf | ‍–‍100 kg |
World Juniors Championships
| Bronze medal – third place | 1998 Cali | ‍–‍81 kg |

Profile at external databases
- IJF: 82
- JudoInside.com: 6350
- Updated on 17 July 2023

Takashi Ono (小野 卓志, Ono Takashi; born 25 June 1980) is a Japanese judoka and the 2005 Asian Judo Championships gold medalist in the −81 kg category.

Ono is from Ishige, Ibaraki, and has studied Judo alongside Keiji Suzuki since childhood. After graduating from Tsukuba University, he joined Ryotokuji Gakuen, of which Yusuke Kanamaru, Tomoo Torii, and former Asian champion Yuta Yazaki are also members. He won the all Japanese championships from 2008 to 2010 and, although the favorite at the Tokyo 2010 World Championships, was eliminated in the 3rd round by former Olympic champion Ilias Iliadis. Ono is renowned for his uchi mata (inner thigh throw). He is also well known for his Ōuchi gari (大内刈 major inside leg reap). In 2009–2010, Ono was regarded as one of the most exciting judoka in the world. Despite his popularity, he lost his place in the 2012 Olympics; Japan instead chose Masashi Nishiyama for ‍–‍90 kg.
