= Hugo Pessanha =

Brazilian judoka (born 1986)

Personal information
- Born: 1 April 1986 (age 40) Rio de Janeiro, RJ
- Occupation: Judoka

Sport
- Country: Brazil
- Sport: Judo
- Weight class: ‍–‍90 kg

Achievements and titles
- World Champ.: 7th (2011)
- Pan American Champ.: (2006, 2010)
Medal record
Men's judo
Representing Brazil
Pan American Championships
Gold medal – first place	2006 Buenos Aires	‍–‍90 kg
Gold medal – first place	2010 San Salvador	‍–‍90 kg
World Masters
Bronze medal – third place	2012 Almaty	‍–‍90 kg
IJF Grand Slam
Gold medal – first place	2010 Rio de Janeiro	‍–‍90 kg
Silver medal – second place	2009 Rio de Janeiro	‍–‍90 kg
Silver medal – second place	2012 Rio de Janeiro	‍–‍100 kg
Bronze medal – third place	2011 Moscow	‍–‍90 kg
Bronze medal – third place	2011 Rio de Janeiro	‍–‍90 kg
IJF Grand Prix
Silver medal – second place	2013 Miami	‍–‍100 kg
Bronze medal – third place	2014 Havana	‍–‍100 kg
Pan American Cadet Championships
Gold medal – first place	2001 Acapulco	‍–‍90 kg

Profile at external databases
- IJF: 2075
- JudoInside.com: 24848
- Updated on 20 November 2022

Hugo Pessanha (born 1 April 1986) is a judoka from Brazil.

== See also ==
- History of martial arts
- List of judo techniques
- List of judoka
- Martial arts timeline
