= 2012 World Team Judo Championships – Men's team =

Judo competition

Judo Men's team at the 2012 World Team Judo Championships
- Venue: Salvador
- Location: Salvador, Brazil
- Dates: 27–28 October 2012
- Competitors: 100 from 14 nations

Medalists
gold medal	Russia (1st title)
silver medal	Japan
bronze medal	Georgia
bronze medal	Brazil

Competition at external databases
- Links: IJF • EJU • JudoInside

The men's team competition at the 2012 World Team Judo Championships was held on 27 and 28 of October in Salvador, Brazil.

== Results ==
Round of 16
United States	1
Cuba	4
Japan	4
Uzbekistan	1
Great Britain	0
Georgia	5
Ukraine	1
Russia	4
South Korea	5
Mongolia	0
Algeria	4
Argentina	1

Quarter-finals
France	3
Cuba	2
Japan	3
Georgia	2
Brazil	2
Russia	3
South Korea	4
Algeria	1

Semi-finals
France	0
Japan	5
Russia	5
South Korea	0

Final
Japan	2
Russia	3

=== Repechage ===
Repechage
Cuba	2
Georgia	3

Third place
Georgia	4
South Korea	1

Repechage
Brazil	5
Algeria	0

Third place
Brazil	3
France	2
