= Yuka Nishida =

Japanese judoka (born 1985)

Personal information
- Born: 27 December 1985 (age 40)
- Occupation: Judoka

Sport
- Country: Japan
- Sport: Judo
- Weight class: ‍–‍52 kg

Achievements and titles
- World Champ.: (2010)
- Asian Champ.: (gold) (2011, 2012)
Medal record
Women's judo
Representing Japan
World Championships
Gold medal – first place	2010 Tokyo	‍–‍52 kg
Silver medal – second place	2011 Paris	‍–‍52 kg
Bronze medal – third place	2007 Rio de Janeiro	‍–‍52 kg
Asian Championships
Gold medal – first place	2011 Abu Dhabi	‍–‍52 kg
Gold medal – first place	2012 Tashkent	‍–‍52 kg
Bronze medal – third place	2015 Kuwait City	‍–‍52 kg
World Masters
Gold medal – first place	2012 Almaty	‍–‍52 kg
Silver medal – second place	2011 Baku	‍–‍52 kg
Bronze medal – third place	2010 Suwon	‍–‍52 kg
IJF Grand Slam
Gold medal – first place	2008 Tokyo	‍–‍52 kg
Gold medal – first place	2009 Rio de Janeiro	‍–‍52 kg
Gold medal – first place	2010 Moscow	‍–‍52 kg
Gold medal – first place	2010 Tokyo	‍–‍52 kg
Gold medal – first place	2012 Paris	‍–‍52 kg
Silver medal – second place	2011 Moscow	‍–‍52 kg
Silver medal – second place	2014 Tokyo	‍–‍52 kg
IJF Grand Prix
Gold medal – first place	2011 Düsseldorf	‍–‍52 kg
Gold medal – first place	2015 Qingdao	‍–‍52 kg
Silver medal – second place	2014 Qingdao	‍–‍52 kg
World Juniors Championships
Gold medal – first place	2004 Budapest	‍–‍52 kg
Asian Junior Championships
Gold medal – first place	2003 Macau	‍–‍52 kg

Profile at external databases
- IJF: 2025
- JudoInside.com: 15205
- Updated on 17 July 2023

Yuka Nishida (西田 優香, Nishida Yuka; born 27 December 1985 in Kanoya, Kagoshima) is a female Japanese judoka. She won the gold medal in the half-lightweight (52 kg) division at the 2010 World Judo Championships.
