= Nijat Shikhalizada =

Azerbaijani judoka (born 1988)

Nijat Shikhalizade
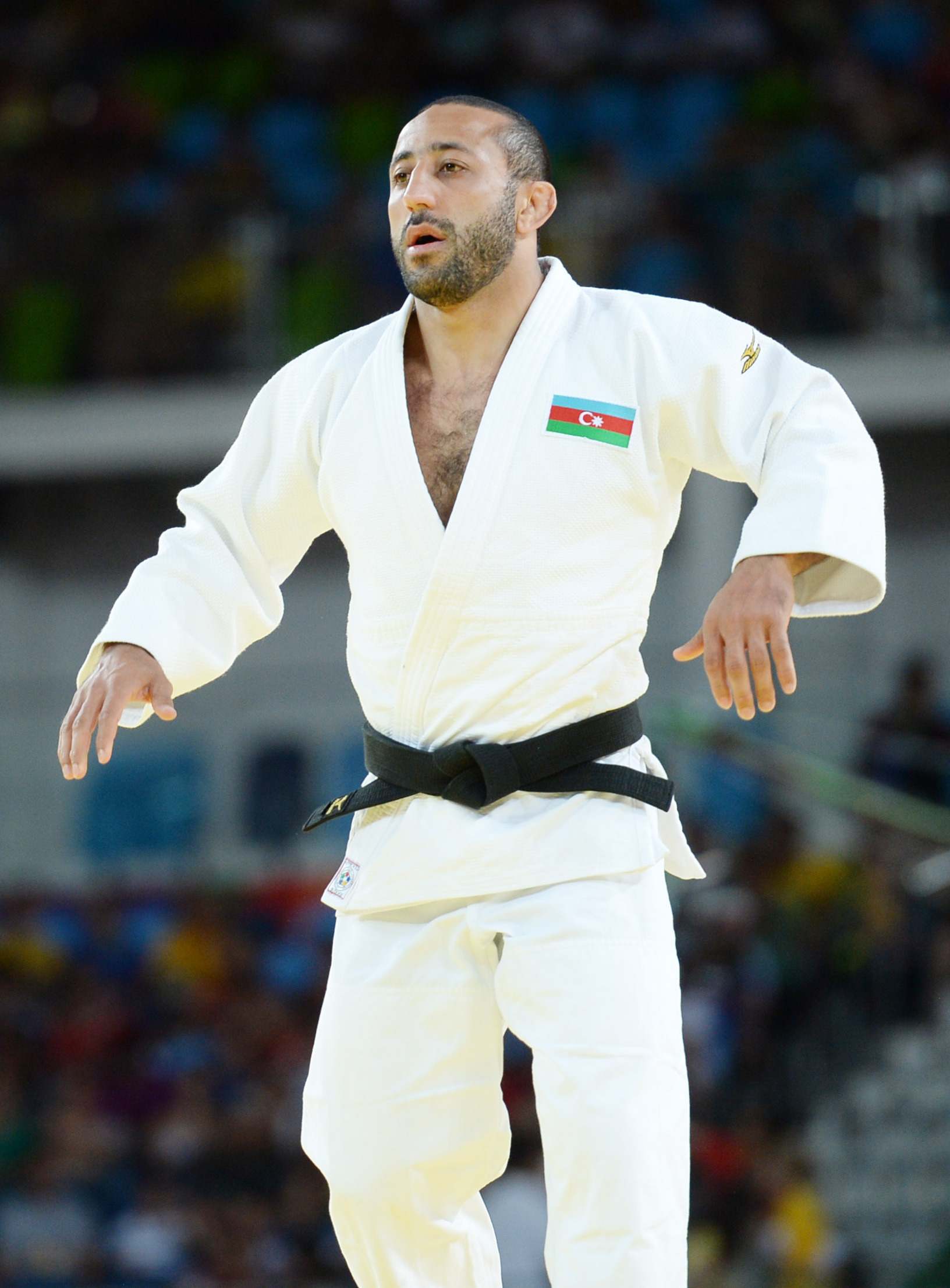

Personal information
- Born: 12 October 1988 (age 37)
- Occupation: Judoka

Sport
- Country: Azerbaijan
- Sport: Judo
- Weight class: ‍–‍60 kg, ‍–‍66 kg

Achievements and titles
- Olympic Games: R16 (2016)
- World Champ.: (bronze) (2005)
- European Champ.: (bronze) (2017)
Medal record
Men's judo
Representing Azerbaijan
World Championships
Bronze medal – third place	2005 Cairo	‍–‍60 kg
European Championships
Bronze medal – third place	2017 Warsaw	‍–‍66 kg
World Masters
Bronze medal – third place	2016 Guadalajara	‍–‍66 kg
IJF Grand Slam
Gold medal – first place	2015 Baku	‍–‍66 kg
Silver medal – second place	2013 Baku	‍–‍66 kg
Silver medal – second place	2017 Abu Dhabi	‍–‍66 kg
Silver medal – second place	2019 Baku	‍–‍66 kg
Bronze medal – third place	2017 Paris	‍–‍66 kg
Bronze medal – third place	2021 Antalya	‍–‍66 kg
IJF Grand Prix
Gold medal – first place	2012 Abu Dhabi	‍–‍66 kg
Gold medal – first place	2014 Tbilisi	‍–‍66 kg
Gold medal – first place	2015 Qingdao	‍–‍66 kg
Silver medal – second place	2013 Abu Dhabi	‍–‍66 kg
Silver medal – second place	2019 Perth	‍–‍66 kg
Bronze medal – third place	2012 Baku	‍–‍66 kg
Bronze medal – third place	2014 Budapest	‍–‍66 kg
Bronze medal – third place	2018 Tashkent	‍–‍66 kg
World Juniors Championships
Gold medal – first place	2006 Santo Domingo	‍–‍60 kg
European Junior Championships
Gold medal – first place	2005 Zagreb	‍–‍60 kg
European Cadet Championships
Gold medal – first place	2004 Rotterdam	‍–‍55 kg
Silver medal – second place	2003 Baku	‍–‍50 kg
Islamic Solidarity Games
Gold medal – first place	2017 Baku	‍–‍66 kg
Gold medal – first place	2017 Baku	Men's team

Profile at external databases
- IJF: 6978
- JudoInside.com: 30153
- Updated on 11 November 2022

Nijat Shikhalizade (Azerbaijani: Nicat Şıxəlizadə; born 12 October 1988, in Sharur, Azerbaijan) is an Azerbaijani judoka.

In 2021, Shikhalizade won a bronze medal in the men's 66 kg competition at the 2021 Judo Grand Slam Antalya held in Antalya, Turkey.

== Achievements ==
Year	Tournament	Place	Weight class
2007	European Judo Championships	5th	Extra lightweight (60 kg)
2005	World Judo Championships	3rd	Extra lightweight (60 kg)
2005	European Judo Championships	5th	Extra lightweight (60 kg)
