= 2016 European Judo Championships – Men's team =

Judo competition

Judo Men's team at the 2016 European Judo Championships
- Venue: TatNeft Arena
- Location: Kazan, Russia
- Date: 24 April

Medalists
gold medal	Georgia (8th title)
silver medal	Russia
bronze medal	Poland
bronze medal	Azerbaijan

Competition at external databases
- Links: JudoInside

The men's team competition at the 2016 European Judo Championships was held on 24 April at the TatNeft Arena in Kazan, Russia.

== Results ==
Round of 16
France	3
Belarus	2
Serbia	3
Germany	2
Russia	5
Lithuania	0
Czech Republic	3
Austria	2
Georgia	5
Hungary	0
Greece	4
Italy	1
Ukraine	2
Poland	3
Latvia	1
Azerbaijan	4

Quarterfinals
France	3
Serbia	2
Russia	4
Czech Republic	1
Georgia	4
Greece	1
Poland	3
Azerbaijan	2

Semifinals
France	2
Russia	3
Georgia	4
Poland	1

Final
Russia	2
Georgia	3

=== Repechage ===
Repechage
Serbia	0
Czech Republic	5

Third place
Czech Republic	2
Poland	3

Repechage
Greece	2
Azerbaijan	3

Third place
Azerbaijan	3
France	2
