= Kirill Denisov =

Russian judoka (born 1988)

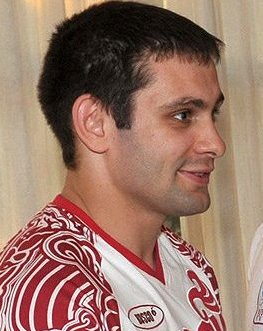
- Denisov in 2012

Personal information
- Full name: Kirill Georgiyevich Denisov
- Born: 25 January 1988 (age 38) Tryokhgorny, Chelyabinsk Oblast, Soviet Union
- Occupation: Judoka
- Height: 1.82 m (6 ft 0 in)

Sport
- Country: Russia
- Sport: Judo
- Weight class: –100 kg

Achievements and titles
- Olympic Games: 5th (2012)
- World Champ.: (silver) (2009, 2015)
- European Champ.: (gold) (2013, 2015)
Medal record
Men's judo
Representing Russia
World Championships
Silver medal – second place	2009 Rotterdam	‍–‍90 kg
Silver medal – second place	2013 Rio de Janeiro	Men's team
Silver medal – second place	2014 Chelyabinsk	Men's team
Silver medal – second place	2015 Astana	‍–‍90 kg
Bronze medal – third place	2010 Tokyo	‍–‍90 kg
Bronze medal – third place	2013 Rio de Janeiro	‍–‍90 kg
Bronze medal – third place	2017 Budapest	‍–‍100 kg
Bronze medal – third place	2019 Tokyo	Mixed team
European Games
Gold medal – first place	2015 Baku	‍–‍90 kg
Bronze medal – third place	2015 Baku	Men's team
European Championships
Gold medal – first place	2013 Budapest	‍–‍90 kg
Silver medal – second place	2011 Istanbul	‍–‍90 kg
Bronze medal – third place	2010 Vienna	Men's team
Bronze medal – third place	2017 Warsaw	‍–‍100 kg
World Masters
Silver medal – second place	2010 Suwon	‍–‍90 kg
Silver medal – second place	2013 Tyumen	‍–‍90 kg
Bronze medal – third place	2011 Baku	‍–‍90 kg
IJF Grand Slam
Gold medal – first place	2009 Rio de Janeiro	‍–‍90 kg
Gold medal – first place	2016 Tokyo	‍–‍100 kg
Silver medal – second place	2010 Rio de Janeiro	‍–‍90 kg
Silver medal – second place	2019 Ekaterinburg	‍–‍100 kg
Bronze medal – third place	2009 Paris	‍–‍90 kg
Bronze medal – third place	2012 Paris	‍–‍90 kg
Bronze medal – third place	2016 Baku	‍–‍90 kg
Bronze medal – third place	2017 Abu Dhabi	‍–‍100 kg
Bronze medal – third place	2019 Brasilia	‍–‍100 kg
IJF Grand Prix
Gold medal – first place	2010 Qingdao	‍–‍90 kg
Gold medal – first place	2013 Samsun	‍–‍90 kg
Gold medal – first place	2016 Qingdao	‍–‍100 kg
Gold medal – first place	2018 Agadir	‍–‍100 kg
Silver medal – second place	2014 Tashkent	‍–‍90 kg
Silver medal – second place	2017 Hohhot	‍–‍100 kg
Bronze medal – third place	2011 Qingdao	‍–‍90 kg
Bronze medal – third place	2013 Abu Dhabi	‍–‍90 kg
Bronze medal – third place	2014 Tbilisi	‍–‍90 kg
Bronze medal – third place	2014 Ulaanbaatar	‍–‍90 kg
Bronze medal – third place	2015 Jeju	‍–‍90 kg
Bronze medal – third place	2016 Budapest	‍–‍90 kg
European Cadet Championships
Silver medal – second place	2004 Rotterdam	‍–‍73 kg

Profile at external databases
- IJF: 362
- JudoInside.com: 33464
- Updated on 26 June 2023

Kirill Georgiyevich Denisov (Russian: Кири́лл Гео́ргиевич Дени́сов; born 25 January 1988) is a Russian judoka.

== Career ==
He competed at the 2012 Summer Olympics in the -90 kg event and lost in the semifinals to Asley González of Cuba before losing the bronze medal match to Masashi Nishiyama of Japan. Denisov won a silver medal at the 2009 World Judo Championships, a bronze at the 2010 World Judo Championships and a silver at the 2011 European Judo Championships.
