= 2013 European Judo Championships – Men's team =

Judo competition

Judo Men's team at the 2013 European Judo Championships
- Venue: László Papp Budapest Sports Arena
- Location: Budapest, Hungary
- Date: 28 April

Medalists
gold medal	Georgia (6th title)
silver medal	Russia
bronze medal	Ukraine
bronze medal	Germany

Competition at external databases
- Links: EJU • JudoInside

The men's team competition at the 2013 European Judo Championships was held on 28 April at the László Papp Budapest Sports Arena in Budapest, Hungary.

== Results ==
Round of 16
Latvia	2
Hungary	3
Poland	3
Italy	2
Czech Republic	0
Netherlands	5
Russia	5
Azerbaijan	0
Belarus	2
Slovenia	3
Ukraine	5
Austria	0
France	1
Germany	4

Quarter-finals
Georgia	4
Hungary	1
Poland	2
Netherlands	3
Russia	3
Slovenia	2
Ukraine	3
Germany	2

Semi-finals
Georgia	4
Netherlands	1
Russia	5
Ukraine	0

Final
Georgia	4
Russia	1

=== Repechage ===
Repechage
Hungary	3
Poland	2

Third place
Hungary	1
Ukraine	4

Repechage
Slovenia	2
Germany	3

Third place
Germany	3
Netherlands	2
