= 2012 World Team Judo Championships =

Judo competition

2012 Judo World Team Judo Championships
- Venue: Salvador
- Location: Salvador, Brazil
- Dates: 27–28 October

Champions
- Men's team: Russia (1st title)
- Women's team: Japan (4th title)

Competition at external databases
- Links: IJF • EJU • JudoInside

The 2012 World Team Judo Championships were held in Salvador, Brazil from 27 to 28 October 2012.

== Medal summary ==
Event	Gold	Silver	Bronze
Men's team	Russia	Japan	Georgia
Men's team	Russia	Japan	Brazil
Women's team	Japan	China	Cuba
Women's team	Japan	China	Brazil
