= 2012 European Judo Championships – Men's team =

Judo competition

Judo Men's team at the 2012 European Judo Championships
- Venue: Traktor Ice Arena
- Location: Chelyabinsk, Russia
- Date: 29 April
- Nations: 8

Medalists
gold medal	Georgia (5th title)
silver medal	Russia
bronze medal	Ukraine
bronze medal	Poland

Competition at external databases
- Links: EJU • JudoInside

The men's team competition at the 2012 European Judo Championships was held on 29 April at the Traktor Ice Arena in Chelyabinsk, Russia.

== Results ==
Quarter-finals
Ukraine	2
Poland	3
Germany	0
Russia	5
France	4
Great Britain	1
Georgia	5
Turkey	0

Semi-finals
Poland	0
Russia	5
France	2
Georgia	3

Final
Russia	2
Georgia	3

=== Repechage ===
Repechage
Ukraine	3
Germany	2

Third place
Ukraine	3
France	2

Repechage
Great Britain	5
Turkey	0

Third place
Great Britain	1
Poland	4
