= List of Pan American Games medalists in water skiing =

This is the list of Pan American medalists in water skiing.

== Men's ==
=== Jump ===
Games	Gold	Silver	Bronze
1995 Mar del Plata	Jaret Llewellyn; Canada	Carl Roberge; United States	Sammy Duvall; United States
1999 Winnipeg	Freddy Krueger; United States	Jaret Llewellyn; Canada	Simón Siegert; Colombia
2003 Santo Domingo	Freddy Krueger; United States	Jaret Llewellyn; Canada	Ryan Dodd; Canada
2007 Rio de Janeiro	Jaret Llewellyn; Canada	Ryan Dodd; Canada	Rodrigo Miranda; Chile
2011 Guadalajara	Freddy Krueger; United States	Rodrigo Miranda; Chile	Felipe Miranda; Chile
2015 Toronto	Ryan Dodd; Canada	Rodrigo Miranda; Chile	Felipe Miranda; Chile
2019 Lima	Taylor Garcia; United States	Felipe Miranda; Chile	Dorien Llewellyn; Canada
2023 Santiago	Emile Ritter; Chile	Dorien Llewellyn; Canada	Tobías Giorgis; Argentina

=== Slalom ===
Games	Gold	Silver	Bronze
1995 Mar del Plata	Carl Roberge; United States	Kreg Llewellyn; Canada	Jorge Renosto; Argentina
1999 Winnipeg	Drew Ross; Canada	Kreg Llewellyn; Canada	Emiliano Botana; Argentina
2003 Santo Domingo	Drew Ross; Canada	Jorge Suarez; Mexico	Javier Julio; Argentina
2007 Rio de Janeiro	Drew Ross; Canada	José Mesa; Colombia	Felipe Miranda; Chile
2011 Guadalajara	Jonathan Travers; United States	Jason McClintock; Canada	Carlos Lamadrid; Mexico
2015 Toronto	Nate Smith; United States	Jason McClintock; Canada	Javier Julio; Argentina
2019 Lima	Robert Pigozzi; Dominican Republic	Stephen Neveu; Canada	Carlos Lamadrid; Mexico
2023 Santiago	Nate Smith; United States	Robert Pigozzi; Dominican Republic	Felipe Simioni; Brazil

=== Tricks ===
Games	Gold	Silver	Bronze
1995 Mar del Plata	Jaret Llewellyn; Canada	Tory Baggiano; United States	Sergio Font; Mexico
1999 Winnipeg	Jaret Llewellyn; Canada	Russell Gay; United States	Javier Julio; Argentina
2003 Santo Domingo	Jaret Llewellyn; Canada	Russell Gay; United States	Jorge Ignacio; Argentina
2007 Rio de Janeiro	Jaret Llewellyn; Canada	Cory Pickos; United States	Ryan Dodd; Canada
2011 Guadalajara	Javier Julio; Argentina	Jason McClintock; Canada	Felipe Miranda; Chile
2015 Toronto	Adam Pickos; United States	Jaret Llewellyn; Canada	Javier Julio; Argentina
2019 Lima	Patricio Font; Mexico	Dorien Llewellyn; Canada	Adam Pickos; United States
2023 Santiago	Patricio Font; Mexico	Dorien Llewellyn; Canada	Matías González; Chile

=== Overall ===
Games	Gold	Silver	Bronze
2011 Guadalajara	Javier Julio; Argentina	Felipe Miranda; Chile	Rodrigo Miranda; Chile
2015 Toronto	Felipe Miranda; Chile	Jaret Llewellyn; Canada	Javier Julio; Argentina
2019 Lima	Dorien Llewellyn; Canada	Rodrigo Miranda; Chile	Tobías Giorgis; Argentina
2023 Santiago	Dorien Llewellyn; Canada	Tobías Giorgis; Argentina	Martín Labra; Chile

=== Wakeboard ===
Games	Gold	Silver	Bronze
2007 Rio de Janeiro	Marcelo Giardi; Brazil	Brad Buskas; Canada	Edgardo Martín; Argentina
2011 Guadalajara	Andrew Adkison; United States	Marcelo Giardi; Brazil	Alejo de Palma; Argentina
2015 Toronto	Rusty Malinoski; Canada	Daniel Powers; United States	Juan Mendez; Venezuela
2019 Lima	Andrew Adkison; United States	Ulf Ditsch; Argentina	Patricio González; Mexico
2023 Santiago	Kai Ditsch; Argentina	Hunter Smith; Canada	Daniel Johnson; United States

== Women's ==
=== Jump ===
Games	Gold	Silver	Bronze
1995 Mar del Plata	Sherri Sloan; United States	Kim DeMacedo; Canada	Andrea Gaytánl; Mexico
1999 Winnipeg	Rhoni Barton; United States	Karen Truelove; United States	Kim DeMacedo; Canada
2003 Santo Domingo	Karissa Wedd; Canada	Rhoni Barton; United States	Regina Jaquess; United States
2007 Rio de Janeiro	Regina Jaquess; United States	Whitney McClintock; Canada	Mandy Nightingale; United States
2011 Guadalajara	Regina Jaquess; United States	Whitney McClintock; Canada	Karen Stevens; Canada
2015 Toronto	Regina Jaquess; United States	Whitney McClintock; Canada	Fernanda Naser; Chile
2019 Lima	Regina Jaquess; United States	Whitney McClintock; Canada	Valentina González; Chile
2023 Santiago	Regina Jaquess; United States	Agustina Varas; Chile	Paige Rini; Canada

=== Slalom ===
Games	Gold	Silver	Bronze
1995 Mar del Plata	Deena Mapple; United States	Susi Graham; Canada	Kim DeMacedo; Canada
1999 Winnipeg	Kristi Overton-Johnson; United States	Susi Graham; Canada	Karen Truelove; United States
2003 Santo Domingo	Karen Truelove; United States	Regina Jaquess; United States	Mariana Ramírez; Mexico
2007 Rio de Janeiro	Whitney McClintock; Canada	Regina Jaquess; United States	Mandy Nightingale; United States
2011 Guadalajara	Regina Jaquess; United States	Whitney McClintock; Canada	Karen Stevens; Canada
2015 Toronto	Whitney McClintock; Canada	Regina Jaquess; United States	Erika Lang; United States
2019 Lima	Regina Jaquess; United States	Whitney McClintock; Canada	Paige Rini; Canada
2023 Santiago	Regina Jaquess; United States	Neilly Ross; Canada	Paige Rini; Canada

=== Tricks ===
Games	Gold	Silver	Bronze
1995 Mar del Plata	Tawn Larsen; United States	Kim DeMacedo; Canada	Lorena Botana; Argentina
1999 Winnipeg	Rhoni Barton; United States	Lorena Botana; Argentina	Mariana Ramírez; Mexico
2003 Santo Domingo	Regina Jaquess; United States	Rhoni Barton; United States	Mariana Ramírez; Mexico
2007 Rio de Janeiro	Whitney McClintock; Canada	Mandy Nightingale; United States	Regina Jaquess; United States
2011 Guadalajara	Whitney McClintock; Canada	Maria Linares; Colombia	Regina Jaquess; United States
2015 Toronto	Natalia Cuglievan; Peru	Whitney McClintock; Canada	Erika Lang; United States
2019 Lima	Natalia Cuglievan; Peru	Erika Lang; United States	Paige Rini; Canada
2023 Santiago	Erika Lang; United States	Neilly Ross; Canada	Anna Gay; United States

=== Overall ===
Games	Gold	Silver	Bronze
2011 Guadalajara	Regina Jaquess; United States	Whitney McClintock; Canada	Karen Stevens; United States
2015 Toronto	Whitney McClintock; Canada	Regina Jaquess; United States	Carolina Chapoy; Mexico
2019 Lima	Regina Jaquess; United States	Whitney McClintock; Canada	Paige Rini; Canada
2023 Santiago	Regina Jaquess; United States	Paige Rini; Canada	Anna Gay; United States

=== Wakeboard ===
Games	Gold	Silver	Bronze
2019 Lima	Eugenia De Armas; Argentina	Mary Howell; United States	Mariana Nep Ribeiro; Brazil
2023 Santiago	Eugenia de Armas; Argentina	Mary Howell; United States	Ignacia Holscher; Chile

== Team ==
Games	Gold	Silver	Bronze
1995 Mar del Plata	United States	Canada	Argentina

== All-time medal table ==
Rank	Nation	Gold	Silver	Bronze	Total
1	United States	32	17	14	63
2	Canada	19	33	12	64
3	Argentina	5	3	14	22
4	Chile	2	6	11	19
5	Mexico	2	1	9	12
6	Peru	2	0	0	2
7	Brazil	1	1	2	4
8	Dominican Republic	1	1	0	2
9	Colombia	0	2	1	3
10	Venezuela	0	0	1	1
Totals (10 entries)		64	64	64	192
