= Water skiing at the 2023 Pan American Games – Women's tricks =

Women's tricks at the 2023 Pan American Games
- Venue: Laguna Los Morros
- Dates: October 22 - October 23
- Competitors: 12 from 8 nations
- Winning score: 11030

Medalists
Gold medal	Erika Lang	United States
Silver medal	Neilly Ross	Canada
Bronze medal	Anna Gay	United States

The women's tricks competition of the water skiing events at the 2023 Pan American Games was held from October 22 to 23 at Laguna Los Morros in Santiago, Chile.

== Schedule ==
Date	Time	Round
October 22, 2023	09:30	Preliminary Round
October 23, 2023	14:20	Final

== Results ==
=== Preliminary round ===
The highest six scores advance to the final. Only 2 athletes by NOC can advance.

Rank	Name	Country	Result	Notes
1	Erika Lang	United States	10590	Q
2	Neilly Ross	Canada	10430	Q
3	Anna Gay	United States	10320	Q
4	Natalia Cuglievan	Peru	9900	Q
5	Paige Rini	Canada	8410	Q
6	Daniela Verswyvel	Colombia	7270	Q
7	Regina Jaquess	United States	6360	
8	Martina Piedrahita	Colombia	4290	
9	Violeta Mociulsky	Argentina	3970	
10	Martina Font	Mexico	3150	
11	Agustina Varas	Chile	2720	
12	Francesca Pigozzi	Dominican Republic	1660	

=== Final ===
The results were as follows:

Rank	Name	Country	Result	Notes
1st place, gold medalist(s)	Erika Lang	United States	11030	
2nd place, silver medalist(s)	Neilly Ross	Canada	10870	
3rd place, bronze medalist(s)	Anna Gay	United States	10210	
4	Natalia Cuglievan	Peru	10060	
5	Daniela Verswyvel	Colombia	8540	
6	Paige Rini	Canada	7160	
