= Water skiing at the 2023 Pan American Games – Men's tricks =

Men's tricks at the 2023 Pan American Games
- Venue: Laguna Los Morros
- Dates: October 22 - October 23
- Competitors: 12 from 8 nations
- Winning score: 11910

Medalists
| Gold medal | Patricio Font | Mexico |
| Silver medal | Dorien Llewellyn | Canada |
| Bronze medal | Matías González | Chile |

The men's tricks competition of the water skiing events at the 2023 Pan American Games was held from October 22 to 23 at Laguna Los Morros in Santiago, Chile.

== Schedule ==
| Date | Time | Round |
|---|---|---|
| October 22, 2023 | 11:10 | Preliminary Round |
| October 23, 2023 | 15:00 | Final |

== Results ==
=== Preliminary round ===
The highest nine scores advance to the final. Only 2 athletes by NOC can advance.

| Rank | Name | Country | Result | Notes |
|---|---|---|---|---|
| 1 | Patricio Font | Mexico | 12090 | Q |
| 2 | Martín Labra | Chile | 12060 | Q |
| 3 | Matías González | Chile | 11830 | Q |
| 4 | Dorien Llewellyn | Canada | 10370 | Q |
| 5 | Tobías Giorgis | Argentina | 9510 | Q |
| 6 | Patricio Zohar | Argentina | 5770 | Q |
| 7 | Carlos Lamadrid | Mexico | 4600 | Q |
| 8 | Álvaro Lamadrid | Mexico | 3710 | |
| 9 | Pablo Alvira | Colombia | 3280 | Q |
| 10 | Antonio Collazo | Argentina | 2540 | |
| 11 | Paolo Pigozzi | Dominican Republic | 650 | |
| 12 | Nate Smith | United States | 80 | |

=== Final ===
The results were as follows:

| Rank | Name | Country | Result | Notes |
|---|---|---|---|---|
| 1st place, gold medalist(s) | Patricio Font | Mexico | 11910 | |
| 2nd place, silver medalist(s) | Dorien Llewellyn | Canada | 10690 | |
| 3rd place, bronze medalist(s) | Matías González | Chile | 10170 | |
| 4 | Martín Labra | Chile | 10120 | |
| 5 | Tobías Giorgis | Argentina | 9330 | |
| 6 | Patricio Zohar | Argentina | 5890 | |
| 7 | Pablo Alvira | Colombia | 5430 | |
| 8 | Carlos Lamadrid | Mexico | DNS | |
