= Water skiing at the 2023 Pan American Games – Men's slalom =

Men's slalom at the 2023 Pan American Games
- Venue: Laguna Los Morros
- Dates: October 21 - October 23
- Competitors: 16 from 8 nations

Medalists
Gold medal	Nate Smith	United States
Silver medal	Robert Pigozzi	Dominican Republic
Bronze medal	Felipe Simioni	Brazil

The men's slalom competition of the water skiing events at the 2023 Pan American Games was held from October 21 to 23 at Laguna Los Morros in Santiago, Chile.

== Schedule ==
Date	Time	Round
October 21, 2023	11:15	Preliminary Round - Serie 2
October 21, 2023	12:10	Preliminary Round - Serie 1
October 23, 2023	10:55	Final

== Results ==
=== Preliminary round ===
Rank	Name	Country	Result	Notes
1	Nate Smith	United States	2.00/58/10.25	Q
2	Robert Pigozzi	Dominican Republic	6.00/58/10.75	Q
3	Carlos Lamadrid	Mexico	3.00/58/10.75	Q
3	Felipe Simioni	Brazil	3.00/58/10.75	Q
5	Antonio Collazo	Argentina	2.00/58/10.75	Q
6	Tobías Giorgis	Argentina	1.50/58/10.75	Q
7	Álvaro Lamadrid	Mexico	5.00/58/11.25	Q
8	Martín Labra	Chile	4.00/58/11.25	Q
9	Dorien Llewellyn	Canada	3.50/58/11.25	
9	Santiago Jaramillo	Colombia	3.50/58/11.25	
11	Andrea Pigozzi	Dominican Republic	3.00/58/11.25	
11	Patricio Zohar	Argentina	3.00/58/11.25	
13	Paolo Pigozzi	Dominican Republic	2.00/58/11.25	
14	Matías González	Chile	1.50/58/11.25	
15	Pablo Alvira	Colombia	5.00/58/12.00	
16	Anthony Furmanovich	Brazil	2.50/58/12.00	

=== Final ===
Rank	Name	Country	Result	Notes
1st place, gold medalist(s)	Nate Smith	United States	3.00/58/10.25	
2nd place, silver medalist(s)	Robert Pigozzi	Dominican Republic	1.00/58/10.25	
3rd place, bronze medalist(s)	Felipe Simioni	Brazil	4.00/58/10.75	
4	Álvaro Lamadrid	Mexico	3.00/58/10.50	
5	Antonio Collazo	Argentina	2.00/58/10.75	
6	Martín Labra	Chile	1.50/58/10.25	
6	Carlos Lamadrid	Mexico	1.50/58/10.25	
6	Tobías Giorgis	Argentina	1.50/58/10.25	
