= Water skiing at the 2023 Pan American Games – Women's slalom =

Women's slalom at the 2023 Pan American Games
- Venue: Laguna Los Morros
- Dates: October 21 - October 23
- Competitors: 13 from 8 nations

Medalists
Gold medal	Regina Jaquess	United States
Silver medal	Neilly Ross	Canada
Bronze medal	Paige Rini	Canada

The women's slalom competition of the water skiing events at the 2023 Pan American Games was held from October 21 to 23 at Laguna Los Morros in Santiago, Chile.

== Schedule ==
Date	Time	Round
October 21, 2023	09:30	Preliminary Round - Serie 2
October 21, 2023	10:20	Preliminary Round - Serie 1
October 23, 2023	13:00	Final

== Results ==
=== Preliminary round ===
- Only 2 per NOC could qualify for the final.

Rank	Name	Country	Result	Notes
1	Regina Jaquess	United States	1.00/55/10.25	Q
2	Paige Rini	Canada	2.00/55/10.75	Q
2	Neilly Ross	Canada	2.00/55/10.75	Q
4	Delfina Cuglievan	Peru	3.00/55/11.25	Q
5	Anna Gay	United States	2.00/55/11.25	Q
7	Violeta Mociuslky	Argentina	3.50/55/12.00	Q
2	Whitney McClintock	Canada	2.00/55/10.75	
6	Erika Lang	United States	1.00/55/11.25	
9	Agustina Varas	Chile	4.50/55/13.00	
10	Martina Font	Mexico	4.00/55/13.00	
11	Daniela Verswyvel	Colombia	2.00/55/13.00	
12	Martina Piedrahita	Colombia	2.00/55/13.00	
13	Francesca Pigozzi	Dominican Republic	0.00/55/18.25	

=== Final ===
Rank	Name	Country	Result	Notes
1st place, gold medalist(s)	Regina Jaquess	United States	4.00/55/10.75	
2nd place, silver medalist(s)	Neilly Ross	Canada	3.00/55/10.75	
3rd place, bronze medalist(s)	Paige Rini	Canada	1.00/55/10.75	
4	Delfina Cuglievan	Peru	3.50/55/11.25	
5	Anna Gay	United States	0.50/55/11.25	
6	Violeta Mociuslky	Argentina	4.00/55/12.00	
