= Water skiing at the 2023 Pan American Games – Men's jump =

Men's jump at the 2023 Pan American Games
- Venue: Laguna Los Morros
- Dates: October 22 - October 23
- Competitors: 10 from 7 nations
- Winning score: 64.7

Medalists
Gold medal	Emile Ritter	Chile
Silver medal	Dorien Llewellyn	Canada
Bronze medal	Tobías Georgis	Argentina

The men's jump competition of the water skiing events at the 2023 Pan American Games was held from October 22 to 23 at Laguna Los Morros in Santiago, Chile.

== Schedule ==
Date	Time	Round
October 21, 2023	11:15	Preliminary Round
October 23, 2023	10:55	Final

== Results ==
=== Preliminary round ===
Rank	Name	Country	Result	Notes
1	Tobías Georgis	Argentina	63.7	Q
2	Dorien Llewellyn	Canada	63.5	Q
3	Emile Ritter	Chile	62.8	Q
4	Martín Labra	Chile	59.3	Q
5	Patricio Zohar	Argentina	56.9	Q
6	Andrea Pigozzi	Dominican Republic	43.3	Q
7	Paolo Pigozzi	Dominican Republic	41.5	Q
8	Álvaro Lamadrid	Mexico	35.2	Q
9	Pablo Alvira	Colombia	10.8	
10	Nate Smith	United States	1.0	

=== Final ===
Rank	Name	Country	Result	Notes
1st place, gold medalist(s)	Emile Ritter	Chile	64.7	
2nd place, silver medalist(s)	Dorien Llewellyn	Canada	64.5	
3rd place, bronze medalist(s)	Tobías Georgis	Argentina	63.3	
4	Martín Labra	Chile	61.3	
5	Patricio Zohar	Argentina	56.8	
6	Andrea Pigozzi	Dominican Republic	44.2	
7	Paolo Pigozzi	Dominican Republic	43.8	
	Álvaro Lamadrid	Mexico	DNS	
