= Water skiing at the 2023 Pan American Games – Men's overall =

Men's overall at the 2023 Pan American Games
- Venue: Laguna Los Morros
- Dates: October 22 and October 24
- Competitors: 9 from 7 nations
- Winning score: 2970.59

Medalists
Gold medal	Dorien Llewellyn	Canada
Silver medal	Tobías Giorgis	Argentina
Bronze medal	Martín Labra	Chile

The men's overall competition of the water skiing events at the 2023 Pan American Games was held on October 22 and 24 at Laguna Los Morros in Santiago, Chile.

== Schedule ==
Date	Time	Round
October 22, 2023	13:50	Preliminary Round
October 24, 2023	10:40	Slalom
October 24, 2023	12:50	Jump
October 24, 2023	14:55	Tricks

== Results ==
The six best overall scores during the preliminary round advance to the final, were medals are determined.

Rank	Athlete	Preliminary Round					Final			
Rank	Athlete	Slalom	Tricks	Jump	Total	R	Slalom	Jump	Tricks	Total
1st place, gold medalist(s)	Dorien Llewellyn (CAN)	812.50	859.87	994.83	2,667.20	3	980.77	1000.00	989.82	2970.59
2nd place, silver medalist(s)	Tobías Giorgis (ARG)	883.93	788.56	1000.00	2,672.49	2	1000.00	689.09	1000.00	2689.09
3rd place, bronze medalist(s)	Martín Labra (CHI)	821.43	1000.00	886.30	2,707.73	1	855.77	963.64	852.42	2671.83
4	Patricio Zohar (ARG)	803.57	478.44	824.29	2,106.30	4	913.46	466.36	839.69	2219.51
5	Matías González (CHI)	776.79	980.93	0.00	1,757.72	5	605.77	975.45	0.00	1581.22
6	Álvaro Lamadrid (MEX)	839.29	307.63	263.57	1,410.49	6	1000.00	171.82	381.68	1553.50
7	Paolo Pigozzi (DOM)	785.71	53.90	426.36	1,265.97	7	did not advance			
8	Nate Smith (USA)	1000.00	6.63	0.00	1,006.63	8	did not advance			
9	Pablo Alvira (COL)	732.14	271.97	0.00	1,004.11	9	did not advance			
