= Water skiing at the 2023 Pan American Games – Qualification =

The following is the qualification system and qualified countries for the Water skiing at the 2023 Pan American Games competitions.

== Qualification system ==
A total of 48 athletes will qualify to compete at the games. The host nation, Chile, automatically qualifies four athletes in water ski and two in wakeboard. The top seven nations at the 2022 Pan American Water Skiing Championship will each receive four athlete quotas. A further 7 spots are made available for wakeboard qualifiers in each event.

== Qualification timeline ==
Events	Date	Venue
2022 Pan American Wakeboard Championships	May 13–15	(Brazil) Nova Lima
2022 South American Games	October 7–9	(Paraguay) Asunción
2022 Pan American Water skiing championships	November 29 – December 3	(Chile) Santiago

== Qualification summary ==
NOC	Water skiing	Men's wakeboarding	Women's wakeboarding	Total athletes
Argentina	4	1	1	6
Brazil	2	1	1	4
Canada	4	1	1	6
Chile	4	1	1	6
Colombia	4	1	1	6
Dominican Republic	4			4
Mexico	4	1	1	6
Paraguay		1	1	2
Peru	2			2
United States	4	1	1	6
Total: 10 NOCs	32	8	8	48

== Water skiing ==
Event	Qualified NOC's	Water skiers per NOC	Total
Host	Chile	4	4
2022 Pan American Championship	United States; Canada; Argentina; Mexico; Dominican Republic; Colombia; ~~Peru~~	4	24
2022 Pan American Championship	Peru; Brazil	2	2
TOTAL			32

- Peru declined two quotas. These were redistributed to Brazil.

== Wakeboarding ==
A total of eight countries qualified in wakeboarding.

Event	Quotas	Qualified Men	Qualified Women
Host nation	1/1	Chile	Chile
2022 Pan American Championship	6/6	Mexico; United States; Argentina; Brazil; Canada; Colombia	Argentina; United States; Brazil; Mexico; Colombia; Canada
2022 South American Games	1/1	Paraguay	Paraguay
TOTAL	8	8	8
