= Water skiing at the 2011 Pan American Games – Women's tricks =

Women's tricks at the 2011 Pan American Games
- Venue: Boca Laguna Water Ski Track
- Dates: October 20 – October 23
- Competitors: 10 from 8 nations

The women's tricks competition of the Water skiing events at the 2011 Pan American Games in Guadalajara were held from October 20 to October 23 at the Boca Laguna Water Ski Track. The defending champion was Whitney McClintock of Canada.

== Schedule ==
All times are Central Standard time (UTC-6).

| Date | Start | Phase |
|---|---|---|
| Thursday, October 20 | 9:00 | Preliminaries |
| Sunday, October 23 | 9:00 | Finals |

== Results ==
=== Preliminaries ===
The top six qualify for the final.

| Rank | Name | Nationality | Score | Notes |
|---|---|---|---|---|
| 1 | Whitney McClintock | Canada | 8350 | q |
| 2 | Regina Jaquess | United States | 7060 | q |
| 3 | Maria Linares | Colombia | 6420 | q |
| 4 | Natalia Cuglievan | Peru | 5960 | q |
| 5 | Sandra Chapoy | Mexico | 5780 | q |
| 6 | Lorena Botana | Argentina | 5740 | q |
| 7 | Tiare Miranda | Chile | 3940 | |
| 8 | Karen Stevens | Canada | 2470 | |
| 9 | Juliana Negaro | Brazil | 1970 | |
| | Maria Cuglievan | Peru | 0 | DNS |
