= Water skiing at the 2019 Pan American Games – Qualification =

The following is the qualification system and qualified countries for the Water skiing at the 2019 Pan American Games competitions.

== Qualification system ==
A total of 48 athletes will qualify to compete at the games. The top seven nations (including the host nation, Peru) at the 2018 Pan American Water Skiing Championship, will each receive four athlete quotas. The remaining spots (four) will be distributed as two per nation (one per gender) to the next best ranked countries. A further 8 spots are made available for wakeboard qualifiers in each event. A nation may enter a maximum of six athletes, with the host nation Peru receiving automatic qualification for all six spots.

== Qualification timeline ==
Events	Date	Venue
2017 Pan American Wakeboard Championships	October 10–14	(Colombia) Bogotá
2018 Pan American Wakeboard Championships	November 2–3	(Mexico) Chapala
2018 Pan American Water skiing championships	November 12–18	(Chile) Santiago

== Qualification summary ==
NOC	Water skiing	Men's wakeboarding	Women's wakeboarding	Total athletes
Argentina	4	1	1	6
Brazil	2	1	1	4
Canada	4	1	1	6
Chile	4	1	1	6
Colombia	4	1	1	6
Dominican Republic	2			2
Mexico	4	1	1	6
Paraguay			1	1
Peru	4	1		5
United States	4	1	1	6
Total: 10 NOCs	32	8	8	48

== Water skiing ==
Event	Qualified NOC's	Water skiers per NOC	Total
Host	Peru	4	4
2018 Pan American Championship	United States; Canada; Chile; Mexico; Argentina; Colombia	4	24
2018 Pan American Championship	Brazil; Dominican Republic	2	4
TOTAL			32

== Wakeboarding ==
A total of nine countries qualified in wakeboarding.

Event	Quotas	Qualified Men	Qualified Women
Host nation	1/~~1~~ 0	Peru	~~Peru~~
2017 Pan American Championship	2/2	Argentina; Mexico	Argentina; Mexico
2018 Pan American Championship	5/5	Canada; Brazil; Colombia; United States; Chile	United States; Colombia; Canada; Brazil; Paraguay
Reallocation	0/1	—N/a	Chile
TOTAL	8	8	8
