= Water skiing at the 2023 Pan American Games – Women's jump =

Women's jump at the 2023 Pan American Games
- Venue: Laguna Los Morros
- Dates: October 22 - October 23
- Competitors: 10 from 8 nations
- Winning score: 52.2

Medalists
Gold medal	Regina Jaquess	United States
Silver medal	Agustina Varas	Chile
Bronze medal	Paige Rini	Canada

The women's jump competition of the water skiing events at the 2023 Pan American Games was held on October 22 at Laguna Los Morros in Santiago, Chile.

== Schedule ==
Date	Time	Round
October 22, 2023	11:15	Preliminary Round
October 22, 2023	12:55	Final

== Results ==
=== Preliminary round ===
Rank	Name	Country	Result	Notes
1	Regina Jaquess	United States	49.4	Q
2	Agustina Varas	Chile	49.2	Q
3	Paige Rini	Canada	45.9	Q
4	Anna Gay	United States	39.7	Q
5	Martina Piedrahita	Colombia	34.1	Q
6	Francesca Pigozzi	Dominican Republic	19.3	Q
7	Martina Font	Mexico	13.4	
8	Delfina Cuglievan	Peru	1.0	
8	Erika Lang	United States	1.0	
8	Violeta Mociulsky	Argentina	1.0	

=== Final ===
Rank	Name	Country	Result	Notes
1st place, gold medalist(s)	Regina Jaquess	United States	52.2	
2nd place, silver medalist(s)	Agustina Varas	Chile	50.2	
3rd place, bronze medalist(s)	Paige Rini	Canada	47.3	
4	Anna Gay	United States	40.8	
5	Martina Piedrahita	Colombia	36.0	
6	Francesca Pigozzi	Dominican Republic	20.0	
