= Water skiing at the 2015 Pan American Games – Women's overall =

Women's overall at the 2015 Pan American Games
- Venue: Ontario Place West Channel
- Dates: July 22
- Competitors: 6 from 4 nations

Medalists
Gold medal	Whitney McClintock	Canada
Silver medal	Regina Jaquess	United States
Bronze medal	Carolina Chapoy	Mexico

The women's overall competition of the Water skiing events at the 2015 Pan American Games in Toronto were held on July 22 at the Ontario Place West Channel. The defending champion was Regina Jaquess of the United States.

== Results ==
=== Final ===
Rank	Name	Country	Trick	Ov. Trick	Slalom	Ov. Slalom	Jump	Ov. Jump	Overall
1st place, gold medalist(s)	Whitney McClintock	Canada	8370	1000.0	0.00/55/11.25	869.6	44.8	926.7	2796.3
2nd place, silver medalist(s)	Regina Jaquess	United States	5610	670.3	4.50/55/11.25	1000.0	47.0	1000.0	2670.3
3rd place, bronze medalist(s)	Carolina Chapoy	Mexico	5990	715.7	2.00/55/12.00	753.6	39.7	756.7	2226.0
4	Erika Lang	United States	6240	745.5	2.00/55/12.00	753.6	33.0	533.3	2032.4
5	Valentina Gonzalez	Chile	4930	589.0	1.50/55/13.00	565.2	36.5	650.0	1804.2
6	Fernanda Naser	Chile	4070	486.3	2.00/55/14.25	405.8	37.0	666.7	1558.8
