= Water skiing at the 2023 Pan American Games – Women's overall =

Women's overall at the 2023 Pan American Games
- Venue: Laguna Los Morros
- Dates: October 22 and October 24
- Competitors: 11 from 8 nations
- Winning score: 2633.02

Medalists
Gold medal	Regina Jaquess	United States
Silver medal	Paige Rini	Canada
Bronze medal	Anna Gay	United States

The women's overall competition of the water skiing events at the 2023 Pan American Games was held on October 22 and 24 at Laguna Los Morros in Santiago, Chile.

== Schedule ==
Date	Time	Round
October 22, 2023	12:30	Preliminary Round
October 24, 2023	10:00	Slalom
October 24, 2023	12:00	Jump
October 24, 2023	14:10	Tricks

== Results ==
The six best overall scores during the preliminary round advance to the final, were medals are determined. Only two athletes per NOC could advance.

Rank	Athlete	Preliminary Round					Final			
Rank	Athlete	Slalom	Tricks	Jump	Total	R	Slalom	Jump	Tricks	Total
1st place, gold medalist(s)	Regina Jaquess (USA)	1000.00	600.57	1000.00	2,600.57	1	1000.00	633.02	1000.00	2633.02
2nd place, silver medalist(s)	Paige Rini (CAN)	909.09	794.15	891.98	2,595.22	2	897.96	838.68	875.37	2612.01
3rd place, bronze medalist(s)	Anna Gay (USA)	800.00	974.50	700.62	2,475.12	3	836.73	1000.00	744.81	2581.54
4	Agustina Varas (CHI)	627.27	256.85	993.83	1,877.95	4	540.82	276.42	863.50	1680.74
5	Martina Piedrahita (COL)	581.82	405.10	527.78	1,514.70	6	530.61	410.38	572.70	1513.69
6	Daniela Verswyvel (COL)	581.82	686.50	0.00	1,268.32	7	530.61	824.53	0.00	1355.14
7	Erika Lang (USA)	781.82	1000.00	0.00	1,781.82	5	did not advance			
8	Violeta Mociulsky (ARG)	718.18	374.88	0.00	1,093.06	8	did not advance			
9	Martina Font (MEX)	618.18	297.45	0.00	915.63	9	did not advance			
10	Delfina Cuglievan (PER)	818.18	0.00	0.00	818.18	10	did not advance			
11	Francesca Pigozzi (DOM)	0.00	156.75	70.99	227.74	11	did not advance			
