= Water skiing at the 2015 Pan American Games – Women's tricks =

Women's tricks at the 2015 Pan American Games
- Venue: Ontario Place West Channel
- Dates: July 20 – July 23
- Competitors: 11 from 7 nations

Medalists
Gold medal	Natalia Cuglievan	Peru
Silver medal	Whitney McClintock	Canada
Bronze medal	Erika Lang	United States

The women's tricks competition of the Water skiing events at the 2015 Pan American Games in Toronto were held from July 20 to July 23 at the Ontario Place West Channel. The defending champion was Whitney McClintock of Canada.

== Results ==
=== Preliminary round ===
Rank	Name	Country	Result	Notes
1	Erika Lang	United States	8590	Q
2	Whitney McClintock	Canada	7920	Q
3	Natalia Cuglievan	Peru	7840	Q
4	Regina Jaquess	United States	6480	Q
5	Carolina Chapoy	Mexico	5740	Q
6	Valentina Gonzalez	Chile	5330	Q
7	Paula Jaramillo	Colombia	4910	
8	Alexandra De Osma	Peru	4180	
9	Fernanda Naser	Chile	4070	
10	Lorena Botana	Argentina	1870	
11	Delfina Cuglievan	Peru	1040	

=== Final ===
Rank	Name	Country	Result	Notes
1st place, gold medalist(s)	Natalia Cuglievan	Peru	8360	
2nd place, silver medalist(s)	Whitney McClintock	Canada	8030	
3rd place, bronze medalist(s)	Erika Lang	United States	8000	
4	Carolina Chapoy	Mexico	5870	
5	Valentina Gonzalez	Chile	4350	
6	Regina Jaquess	United States	4100	
