= Water skiing at the 2022 World Games – Men's slalom =

Water skiing - Men's slalom at the 2022 World Games
- Venue: Oak Mountain State Park, Birmingham, United States
- Dates: 14–15 July 2022
- Competitors: 14 from 14 nations

Medalists
| gold medal | Nate Smith | United States |
| silver medal | Brando Caruso | Italy |
| bronze medal | Cole McCormick | Canada |

The men's slalom competition in water skiing at the 2022 World Games took place from 14 to 15 July 2022 at the Oak Mountain State Park in Birmingham, United States.

== Competition format ==
A total of 14 athletes entered the competition. From preliminary round the best 8 skiers qualify to final.

== Results ==
=== Preliminary round ===
| Rank | Athlete | Nation | Result | Note |
|---|---|---|---|---|
| 1 | Cole McCormick | Canada | 4.00/58/10.75 | Q |
| 2 | Nate Smith | United States | 3.00/58/10.75 | Q |
| 3 | Rob Hazelwood | Great Britain | 5.00/58/11.25 | Q |
| 4 | Robert Pigozzi | Dominican Republic | 4.00/58/11.25 | Q |
| 5 | Brando Caruso | Italy | 3.50/58/11.25 | Q |
| 6 | Martin Bartalsky | Slovakia | 2.00/58/11.25 | Q |
| 7 | Nick Adams | Australia | 3.00/58/12.00 | Q |
| 8 | Travis Fisher | South Africa | 2.00/58/12.00 | Q |
| 9 | Alvaro Lamadrid | Mexico | 5.00/58/13.00 | |
| 10 | Federico Jaramillo | Colombia | 5.00/55/18.25 | |
| 10 | Daniel Odvarko | Czech Republic | 5.00/55/18.25 | |
| | Beny Stadlbaur | Switzerland | DNS | |
| | Filippos Kyprios | Greece | DNS | |
| | Kamil Belmrah | Morocco | DNS | |

=== Final ===
| Rank | Athlete | Nation | Result |
|---|---|---|---|
| 1st place, gold medalist(s) | Nate Smith | United States | 5.00/58/10.75 |
| 2nd place, silver medalist(s) | Brando Caruso | Italy | 1.50/58/10.75 |
| 3rd place, bronze medalist(s) | Cole McCormick | Canada | 4.50/58/11.25 |
| 4 | Nick Adams | Australia | 4.00/58/11.25 |
| 5 | Martin Bartalsky | Slovakia | 3.00/58/11.25 |
| 6 | Rob Hazelwood | Great Britain | 2.50/58/11.25 |
| 7 | Robert Pigozzi | Dominican Republic | 1.50/58/11.25 |
| 8 | Travis Fisher | South Africa | 3.00/58/12.00 |
