= Water skiing at the 1995 Pan American Games =

This page shows the results of the Water Ski Competition at the 1995 Pan American Games, held from March 11 to March 26 in Mar del Plata, Argentina. There were six events, three for both men and women, with the United States dominating the competition. At the 1995 edition Water Skiing made its debut at the Pan American Games.

== Men's competition ==
=== Slalom ===
RANK	FINAL RANKING
Gold medal	Carl Roberto (USA)
Silver medal	Kreg Llewellyn (CAN)
Bronze medal	Jorge Renosto (ARG)

=== Tricks ===
RANK	FINAL RANKING
Gold medal	Jaret Llewellyn (CAN)
Silver medal	Tory Baggiano (USA)
Bronze medal	Sergio Font (MEX)

=== Jump ===
RANK	FINAL RANKING
Gold medal	Jaret Llewellyn (CAN)
Silver medal	Carl Roberge (USA)
Bronze medal	Sammy Duvall (USA)

== Women's competition ==
=== Slalom ===
RANK	FINAL RANKING
Gold medal	Deena Mapple (USA)
Silver medal	Susi Graham (CAN)
Bronze medal	Kim DeMacedo (CAN)

=== Tricks ===
RANK	FINAL RANKING
Gold medal	Tawn Larsen (USA)
Silver medal	Kim DeMacedo (CAN)
	Lorena Botana (ARG)

=== Jump ===
RANK	FINAL RANKING
Gold medal	Sherri Sloan (USA)
Silver medal	Kim DeMacedo (CAN)
Bronze medal	Andrea Gaytán (MEX)

== Team competition ==
RANK	FINAL RANKING
Gold medal	United States (USA)
Silver medal	Canada (CAN)
Bronze medal	Argentina (ARG)

== Medal table ==
Place	Nation	Gold medal	Silver medal	Bronze medal	Total
1	United States	5	2	1	8
2	Canada	2	5	1	8
3	Argentina	0	0	3	3
3	Mexico	0	0	2	2
Total		7	7	7	21
