= Water skiing at the 2011 Pan American Games – Women's slalom =

Women's slalom at the 2011 Pan American Games
- Venue: Boca Laguna Water Ski Track
- Dates: October 21 – October 23
- Competitors: 10 from 8 nations

The women's slalom competition of the Water skiing events at the 2011 Pan American Games in Guadalajara were held from October 21 to October 23 at the Boca Laguna Water Ski Track. The defending champion was Whitney McClintock of Canada.

== Schedule ==
All times are Central Standard time (UTC-6).

Date	Start	Phase
Friday, October 21	9:00	Semifinals
Sunday, October 23	9:00	Finals

== Results ==
=== Preliminaries ===
The top six qualify for the final.

Rank	Name	Nationality	Score	Notes
1	Regina Jaquess	United States	43.00	q
2	Whitney McClintock	Canada	39.00	q
3	Karen Stevens	Canada	33.00	q
4	Maria Cuglievan	Peru	25.50	q
5	Tiare Miranda	Chile	22.00	q
6	Juliana Negaro	Brazil	21.50	q
7	Sandra Chapoy	Mexico	21.00	
8	Maria Linares	Colombia	20.00	
9	Lorena Botana	Argentina	19.50	
10	Ivanna Cuglievan	Peru	17.00	
