= Water skiing at the 2019 Pan American Games =

- Water skiing pictogram
- Venue: La Laguna de Bujama
- Dates: July 27–30, 2019
- No. of events: 10 (5 men, 5 women)
- Competitors: 48 from 10 nations

Water skiing competitions at the 2019 Pan American Games in Lima, Peru were held between July 27th and 30th, 2019 at the La Laguna de Bujama in the district of Mala.

There were a total of ten events held, equally split among men and women. Women's wakeboarding made its Pan American Games debut.

== Medalists ==
=== Medal table ===
* Host nation (Peru)

Rank	Nation	Gold	Silver	Bronze	Total
1	United States	5	2	1	8
2	Canada	1	5	4	10
3	Argentina	1	1	1	3
4	Mexico	1	0	2	3
5	Dominican Republic	1	0	0	1
5	Peru*	1	0	0	1
7	Chile	0	2	1	3
8	Brazil	0	0	1	1
Totals (8 entries)		10	10	10	30

=== Men's events ===
Event	Gold	Silver	Bronze
Jump	Taylor Garcia; United States	Felipe Miranda; Chile	Dorien Llewellyn; Canada
Slalom	Robert Pigozzi; Dominican Republic	Stephen Neveu; Canada	Carlos Lamadrid; Mexico
Tricks	Patricio Font; Mexico	Dorien Llewellyn; Canada	Adam Pickos; United States
Overall	Dorien Llewellyn; Canada	Rodrigo Miranda; Chile	Tobías Giorgis; Argentina
Wakeboard	Andrew Adkison; United States	Ulf Ditsch; Argentina	Patricio González; Mexico

=== Women's events ===
Event	Gold	Silver	Bronze
Jump	Regina Jaquess; United States	Whitney McClintock; Canada	Valentina González; Chile
Slalom	Regina Jaquess; United States	Whitney McClintock; Canada	Paige Rini; Canada
Tricks	Natalia Cuglievan; Peru	Erika Lang; United States	Paige Rini; Canada
Overall	Regina Jaquess; United States	Whitney McClintock; Canada	Paige Rini; Canada
Wakeboard	Eugenia De Armas; Argentina	Mary Howell; United States	Mariana Nep Ribeiro; Brazil

== Participating nations ==
A total of 10 countries qualified athletes. The number of athletes a nation entered is in parentheses beside the name of the country.

- Argentina (6)
- Brazil (4)
- Canada (6)
- Chile (6)
- Colombia (6)
- Dominican Republic (2)
- Mexico (6)
- Paraguay (1)
- Peru (5)
- United States (6)

== Qualification ==
A total of 48 athletes will qualify to compete at the games. The top seven nations (including the host nation, Peru) at the 2018 Pan American Water Skiing Championship, will each receive four athlete quotas. The remaining spots (four) will be distributed as two per nation (one per gender) to the next best ranked countries. A further 8 spots are made available for wakeboard qualifiers in each event. A nation may enter a maximum of six athletes, with the host nation Peru receiving automatic qualification for all six spots.
