= Dominican Republic at the 2022 World Games =

- IOC code: DOM
- NOC: Dominican Republic Olympic Committee

in Birmingham, United States 7 July 2022 – 17 July 2022
- Competitors: 2 (2 men) in 2 sports
- Medals: Gold 0 Silver 0 Bronze 0 Total 0

World Games appearances
- 1981; 1985; 1989; 1993; 1997; 2001; 2005; 2009; 2013; 2017; 2022; 2025

The Dominican Republic competed at the 2022 World Games held in Birmingham, United States from 7 to 17 July 2022.

== Competitors ==
The following is the list of number of competitors in the Games.

| Sport | Men | Women | Total |
|---|---|---|---|
| Racquetball | 1 | 0 | 1 |
| Water skiing | 1 | 0 | 1 |
| Total | 2 | 0 | 2 |

== Racquetball ==
The Dominican Republic competed in racquetball.

| Athlete | Event | Round of 16 | Quarterfinal | Semifinal | Final / BM | |
| Athlete | Event | Opposition Result | Opposition Result | Opposition Result | Opposition Result | Rank |
|---|---|---|---|---|---|---|
| Ramón de León | Men's singles | A Parrilla (MEX); L 6–15, 7–15, 13–15 | did not advance | | | =9 |

== Water skiing ==
The Dominican Republic competed in water skiing.

| Athlete | Event | Qualification | | Final | |
| Athlete | Event | Result | Rank | Result | Rank |
|---|---|---|---|---|---|
| Robert Pigozzi | Men's slalom | 11.25 | 4th Q | 11.25 | 7th |
