= Water skiing at the 1999 Pan American Games =

This page shows the results of the Water Ski Competition at the 1999 Pan American Games, held from July 23 to August 8 in Winnipeg, Manitoba, Canada. There were six events, three for both men and women, with Canada and the United States dominating the competition.

== Men's competition ==
=== Slalom ===
RANK	FINAL RANKING
Gold medal	Drew Ross (CAN)
Silver medal	Kreg Llewellyn (CAN)
Bronze medal	Emiliano Botana (ARG)

=== Tricks ===
RANK	FINAL RANKING
Gold medal	Jaret Llewellyn (CAN)
Silver medal	Russell Gay (USA)
Bronze medal	Javier Julio (ARG)

=== Jump ===
RANK	FINAL RANKING
Gold medal	Freddy Krueger (USA)
Silver medal	Jaret Llewellyn (CAN)
Bronze medal	Simón Siegert (COL)

== Women's competition ==
=== Slalom ===
RANK	FINAL RANKING
Gold medal	Kristi Overton Johnson (USA)
Silver medal	Susi Graham (CAN)
Bronze medal	Karen Truelove (USA)

=== Tricks ===
RANK	FINAL RANKING
Gold medal	Rhoni Barton (USA)
Silver medal	Lorena Botana (ARG)
	Mariana Ramírez (MEX)

=== Jump ===
RANK	FINAL RANKING
Gold medal	Rhoni Barton (USA)
Silver medal	Karen Truelove (USA)
Bronze medal	Kim DeMacedo (CAN)

== Medal table ==
Place	Nation	Gold medal	Silver medal	Bronze medal	Total
1	United States	4	2	1	7
2	Canada	2	3	1	6
3	Argentina	0	1	2	3
4	Mexico	0	0	1	1
4	Colombia	0	0	1	1
Total		6	6	6	18
