= Taekwondo at the 2023 Pan American Games – Men's 68 kg =

Men's 68 kg at the 2023 Pan American Games
- Venue: Contact Sports Center
- Start date: October 21, 2023
- End date: October 21, 2023
- Competitors: 15 from 14 nations

Medalists
Gold medal	Khalfani Harris	United States
Silver medal	Bernando Pie	Dominican Republic
Bronze medal	Tae-Ku Park	Canada
Bronze medal	José Luis Acuña	Argentina

The men's 68 kg competition of the taekwondo events at the 2023 Pan American Games in Santiago, Chile, was held on October 21 at the Contact Sports Center. A total of 15 athletes from 14 NOC's competed.

== Qualification ==
The host nation, Chile, automatically qualified automatically and the quotas spots were awarded at the qualification tournament held in Rio de Janeiro in March 2023. The final quota spots were awarded as wildcards (if applicable).

== Results ==
=== Bracket ===
Round of 16
Gamalier De Luis (PUR)	0
David Paz (COL)	2
Carlos Navarro (MEX)	1
Angel Fernandez (CUB)	2
Uriel Gomez (MEX)	0
Khalfani Harris (USA)	2
Ignacio Morales (CHI)	2
Samaki Pinas (SUR)	0
Jose Nieto (ECU)	0
Tae Ku Park (CAN)	2
Federico González (URU)	2
Diego Montufar (EAI)	1
José Luis Acuña (ARG)	0
Bernando Pie (DOM)	2

Quarterfinals
Edival Pontes (BRA)	1
David Paz (COL)	2
Angel Fernandez (CUB)	0
Khalfani Harris (USA)	2
Ignacio Morales (CHI)	1
Tae Ku Park (CAN)	2
Federico González (URU)	0
Bernando Pie (DOM)	2

Semifinals
David Paz (COL)	0
Khalfani Harris (USA)	2
Tae-Ku Park (CAN)	1
Bernando Pie (DOM)	2

Gold medal match
Khalfani Harris (USA)	2
Bernando Pie (DOM)	0

=== Repechage ===
Repechage		Bronze medal match
Uriel Gomez (MEX)	1
Ángel Fernández (CUB)	2
Ángel Fernández (CUB)	2	Ángel Fernández (CUB)	0
		Tae-Ku Park (CAN)	2

Repechage		Bronze medal match
Federico González (URU)	0
José Luis Acuña (ARG)	2
José Luis Acuña (ARG)	2	José Luis Acuña (ARG)	2
		David Paz (COL)	0
