= Judo at the 2023 Pan American Games – Men's 81 kg =

Judo Men's 81 kg at the 2023 Pan American Games
- Venue: Contact Sports Center
- Location: Santiago, Chile
- Date: October 29
- Competitors: 10 from 10 nations
- Website: Official website

Medalists
gold medal	Guilherme Schimidt (1st title); Brazil
silver medal	Jorge Pérez; Chile
bronze medal	David Popovici; Canada
bronze medal	Medickson del Orbe; Dominican Republic

Competition at external databases
- Links: IJF

The men's 81 kg competition of the judo events at the 2023 Pan American Games was held on October 29 at the Contact Sports Center (Centro de Entrenamiento de los Deportes de Contacto) in Santiago, Chile. A total of 10 athletes from 10 NOC's competed.

== Schedule ==
All times are local (UTC−3)

Date	Time	Event
Sunday, 29 October 2023	10:00	Elimination round of 16
Sunday, 29 October 2023	11:00	Quarterfinals
Sunday, 29 October 2023	11:00	Repechage
Sunday, 29 October 2023	12:00	Semifinals
Sunday, 29 October 2023	15:00	Finals

== Results ==
=== Main Bracket ===
Round of 16
Kell Berliner (USA)	00
David Popovici (CAN)	10
Gustavo López (ESA)	00
Jorge Pérez (CHI)	10 (yellow card)

Quarter-finals
Medickson del Orbe (DOM)	11 (yellow card)
Tomás Morales (ARG)	01 (yellow card)
Guilherme Schimidt (BRA)	10
David Popovici (CAN)	00
Maikel McKenzie (CUB)	01 (yellow card)
Samuel Ayala (MEX)	00 (yellow card)
Alain Mikael Aprahamian (URU)	00 (yellow card)
Jorge Pérez (CHI)	10 (yellow card)

Semi-finals
Medickson del Orbe (DOM)	00
Guilherme Schimidt (BRA)	10
Maikel McKenzie (CUB)	00
Jorge Pérez (CHI)	10 (yellow card)

Gold medal contest
Guilherme Schimidt (BRA)	10
Jorge Pérez (CHI)	00

=== Repechage ===
Repechage
Tomás Morales (ARG)	00 (yellow card)
David Popovici (CAN)	01 (yellow card)
Samuel Ayala (MEX)	00 (yellow card)
Alain Mikael Aprahamian (URU)	01

Bronze medal contests
David Popovici (CAN)	11 (yellow card)
Maikel McKenzie (CUB)	01
Alain Mikael Aprahamian (URU)	00
Medickson del Orbe (DOM)	01 (yellow card)
