= Judo at the 2023 Pan American Games – Women's +78 kg =

Judo Women's +78 kg at the 2023 Pan American Games
- Venue: Contact Sports Center
- Location: Santiago, Chile
- Date: 30 October
- Competitors: 9 from 9 nations
- Website: Official website

Medalists
gold medal	Idalys Ortiz (4th title)	Cuba
silver medal	Brigitte Carabalí	Colombia
bronze medal	Moira Morillo	Dominican Republic
bronze medal	Beatriz Souza	Brazil

Competition at external databases
- Links: IJF

The women's +78 kg competition of the judo events at the 2023 Pan American Games was held on 30 October at the Contact Sports Center (Centro de Entrenamiento de los Deportes de Contacto) in Santiago, Chile. A total of 9 athletes from 9 NOC's competed.

== Schedule ==
All times are local (UTC−3)

Date	Time	Event
Monday, 30 October 2023	10:00	Elimination round of 16
Monday, 30 October 2023	11:00	Quarterfinals
Monday, 30 October 2023	11:55	Repechage
Monday, 30 October 2023	12:00	Semifinals
Monday, 30 October 2023	15:00	Finals

== Results ==
=== Main Bracket ===
Round of 16
Katherine Quevedo (CHI)	00 (yellow card)
Beatriz Souza (BRA)	10

Quarter-finals
Amarantha Urdaneta (VEN)	10 (yellow card)
Izayana Marenco (NCA)	00
Mackenzie Williams (USA)	00
Brigitte Carabalí (COL)	10
Idalys Ortiz (CUB)	10 (yellow card)
Beatriz Souza (BRA)	00
Moira Morillo (DOM)	10
Yuliana Bolívar (PER)	00

Semi-finals
Amarantha Urdaneta (VEN)	00
Brigitte Carabalí (COL)	10
Idalys Ortiz (CUB)	10
Moira Morillo (DOM)	00

Gold medal contest
Brigitte Carabalí (COL)	00
Idalys Ortiz (CUB)	10

=== Repechage ===
Repechage
Izayana Marenco (NCA)	11
Mackenzie Williams (USA)	00
Beatriz Souza (BRA)	10
Yuliana Bolívar (PER)	00 (yellow card)

Bronze medal contests
Izayana Marenco (NCA)	00
Moira Morillo (DOM)	10 (yellow card)
Beatriz Souza (BRA)	10
Amarantha Urdaneta (VEN)	00
