= Adelaide Aquilla =

American track and field athlete (born 1999)

Adelaide Aquilla OLY
Personal information
- Born: Adelaide Aquilla; March 3, 1999 (age 27) Westlake, Ohio, U.S.
- Education: Ohio State University

Sport
- Country: United States
- Sport: Athletics (track and field)
- Events: Shot put; Discus throw; Hammer throw
- University team: Ohio State Buckeyes

Achievements and titles
- Highest world ranking: 10th (shot put, 2023)
- Personal bests: Shot put: 19.64 m (64 ft 5 in) (2022); Discus throw: 57.86 m (189 ft 9 3/4 in) (2022); Hammer throw: 46.19 m (151 ft 6 1/2 in) (2022)
Medal record
Women's athletics
Representing United States
Pan American Games
Bronze medal – third place	2023 Santiago	Shot put

Adelaide Aquilla (/æˈdɛˈleɪd əˈkwɪlˈə/ A-deh-layd ə-KWIL-ə; born March 3, 1999) is an American track and field athlete who competes in shot put. She represented the United States at the 2020 Summer Olympics in Tokyo.

== Early life and education ==
Aquilla was born in Westlake, Ohio, to Tracy and Jared Aquilla. She grew up in Rocky River, Ohio, and has two younger brothers, Jonas and Ambrose.

Aquilla graduated from Magnificat High School in 2017. She then attended Ohio State University, where she double majored in communications and hospitality management and was a walk-on for the Buckeyes track team. She was coached by Ashley Kovacs, wife of Olympic shot putter Joe Kovacs.

== Career ==
Aquilla was a 2019 NCAA outdoor qualifier in the shot put and finished 12th with a personal best outdoor toss of 16.59 m (54 ft 5 in) to earn second-team All-America honors. In 2021 she was successful in defending the title of Big Ten Conference indoor shot put champion, winning at the 2020 meet with a personal best toss of 17.82 m (58 ft 5 1/2 in), and in 2021 she set another personal best with a throw of 19.12 m (62 ft 8 3/4 in). She was a 2020 NCAA indoor All-American in the shot with the nation's third-longest throw. In 2021 Aquilla won both indoor and outdoor NCAA titles and she was named Ohio State's female athlete of the year alongside Justin Fields as her male counterpart.

At the U.S. Olympic Trials in June 2021, Aquilla finished third with a throw of 18.95 m (62 ft 2 in), securing a place at the delayed 2020 Summer Olympics behind Raven Saunders and Jessica Ramsey. She placed 20th at the Olympics with a throw of 17.68 m (58 ft 0 in).

Aquilla won additional NCAA championships at the Outdoor Track and Field Championships in 2022 and the Indoor Track and Field Championships in 2023, setting a collegiate record with a throw of 19.64 m (64 ft 5 in) in the former.

In November 2023, Aquilla won a bronze medal in the shot put at the Pan American Games held in Santiago, Chile.

She finished sixth in shot put at the 2024 Diamond League event in Rabat.

On 25 July, she placed third in the shot put at the 2026 USA Outdoor Track and Field Championships in New York.

== Competition history ==
All results are from World Athletics.

=== International competitions ===
Representing the United States
Year	Competition	Venue	Position	Event	Result	Notes
2021	Olympic Games	Tokyo, Japan	20th	Shot put	17.68 m (58 ft 0 in)	—N/a
2023	Pan American Games	Santiago, Chile	3rd	Shot put	17.73 m (58 ft 2 in)	—N/a

=== National competitions ===
Year	Competition	Venue	Position	Event	Result	Notes
2021	United States Olympic Trials	Eugene, Oregon	3rd	Shot put	18.95 m (62 ft 2 in)	—N/a
2022	USA Championships	Eugene, Oregon	2nd	Shot put	19.45 m (63 ft 9 1/2 in)	—N/a
2023	USA Championships	Eugene, Oregon	2nd	Shot put	19.02 m (62 ft 4 3/4 in)	—N/a
2024	USA Indoor Championships	Albuquerque, New Mexico	3rd	Shot put	18.74 m (61 ft 5 3/4 in)	—N/a
2024	United States Olympic Trials	Eugene, Oregon	4th	Shot put	18.92 m (62 ft 3/4 in)	—N/a
2025	USA Indoor Championships	Staten Island, New York	5th	Shot put	17.76 m (58 ft 3 in)	—N/a

=== NCAA titles ===
- Division I Indoor Track and Field Championships
  - Shot put: 2021, 2023
- Division I Outdoor Track and Field Championships
  - Shot put: 2021, 2022 (PB)
