= Judo at the 2022 Bolivarian Games =

Judo competitions at the 2022 Bolivarian Games

- Judo pictogram
- Venue: Coliseo Colegio Bilingüe
- Dates: 25–28 June 2022
- Competitors: 80 from 9 nations

Champions
- Venezuela (6 gold, 2 silver, 5 bronze)

Judo competitions at the 2022 Bolivarian Games in Valledupar, Colombia were held from 25 to 28 June 2022 at Coliseo Colegio Bilingüe.

Fifteen medal events were scheduled to be contested; seven weight categories each for men and women and one mixed team event. A total of 80 athletes (44 men and 36 women) competed in the events. The events were open competitions without age restrictions.

Venezuela, who were the competition defending champions after Santa Marta 2017, won the judo competitions again after winning 6 of the 15 gold medals at stake.

== Participating nations ==
A total of 9 nations (all the 7 ODEBO nations and 2 invited) registered athletes for the judo events. Each nation was able to enter a maximum of 14 judokas (up to 7 per gender). Each nation could register a maximum of one judoka for the individual events and a team composed by six judokas (3 men and 3 women) for the team mixed event.

- Bolivia (3 athletes)
- Chile (10)
- Colombia (14)
- Ecuador (7)
- Dominican Republic (10)
- Panama (6)
- Paraguay (5)
- Peru (13)
- Venezuela (12)

The participation of judokas from Guatemala was expected, but finally they did not take part.

== Venue ==
The judo competitions were originally scheduled to be held at Coliseo de Combate Óscar Muñoz located within the Centro de Alto Rendimiento La Gota Fría, however, they were eventually held at Coliseo of Fundación Colegio Bilingüe in Valledupar.

== Medal summary ==
=== Medal table ===
* Host nation (Host nation)

Rank	Nation	Gold	Silver	Bronze	Total
1	Venezuela	6	2	5	13
2	Colombia*	4	4	5	13
3	Peru	3	3	5	11
4	Dominican Republic	2	3	2	7
5	Ecuador	0	3	1	4
6	Chile	0	0	6	6
7	Panama	0	0	2	2
Totals (7 entries)		15	15	26	56

Source: Bolivarianos Valledupar 2022 – Judo medals

=== Medalists ===
==== Men's events ====
Event	Gold	Silver	Bronze
60 kg	John Futtinico; Colombia	Iván Salas; Venezuela	Bryan Garboa; Ecuador
60 kg	John Futtinico; Colombia	Iván Salas; Venezuela	Bernabé Vergara; Panama
66 kg	Juan Postigos; Peru	Elmert Ramírez; Dominican Republic	Juan Hernández; Colombia
66 kg	Juan Postigos; Peru	Elmert Ramírez; Dominican Republic	Willis García; Venezuela
73 kg	Arkangel Barboza; Colombia	Sergio Mattey; Venezuela	Alonso Wong; Peru
73 kg	Arkangel Barboza; Colombia	Sergio Mattey; Venezuela	Juan Pablo Vega; Chile
81 kg	Alexander Martínez; Colombia	Albis Castro; Dominican Republic	Jonheluis Patete; Venezuela
81 kg	Alexander Martínez; Colombia	Albis Castro; Dominican Republic	Jorge Daniel Pérez; Chile
90 kg	Carlos Páez; Venezuela	Daniel Paz; Colombia	Yuta Galarreta; Peru
90 kg	Carlos Páez; Venezuela	Daniel Paz; Colombia	Daniel Arancibia; Chile
100 kg	Daryl Yamamoto; Peru	Alejandro Escobar; Colombia	Rafael Romo; Chile
+100 kg	José Nova; Dominican Republic	Freddy Figueroa; Ecuador	William Meléndez; Colombia
+100 kg	José Nova; Dominican Republic	Freddy Figueroa; Ecuador	Mauricio Amézquita; Venezuela

==== Women's events ====
Event	Gold	Silver	Bronze
48 kg	Brillith Gamarra; Peru	Erika Lasso; Colombia	María Gimenez; Venezuela
48 kg	Brillith Gamarra; Peru	Erika Lasso; Colombia	Nemesis Kiroba; Panama
52 kg	Fabiola Díaz; Venezuela	Noemi Huayhuameza; Peru	Luz Álvarez; Colombia
52 kg	Fabiola Díaz; Venezuela	Noemi Huayhuameza; Peru	Judith González; Chile
57 kg	Kady Cabezo; Venezuela	Astrid Gavidia; Ecuador	Marian Flores; Peru
57 kg	Kady Cabezo; Venezuela	Astrid Gavidia; Ecuador	Clara Barinas; Dominican Republic
63 kg	Cindy Mera; Colombia	Creymarlin Valdez; Dominican Republic	Allyson Quevedo; Chile
70 kg	Elvismar Rodríguez; Venezuela	Celinda Corozo; Ecuador	Luisa Bonilla; Colombia
70 kg	Elvismar Rodríguez; Venezuela	Celinda Corozo; Ecuador	Xsara Morales; Peru
78 kg	Karen León; Venezuela	Camila Figueroa; Peru	Brenda Olaya; Colombia
+78 kg	Moira Morillo; Dominican Republic	Brigitte Carabalí; Colombia	Yuliana Bolívar; Peru
+78 kg	Moira Morillo; Dominican Republic	Brigitte Carabalí; Colombia	Amarantha Urdaneta; Venezuela

==== Mixed event ====
Event	Gold	Silver	Bronze
Mixed team	Venezuela (VEN); Mauricio Amézquita; Kady Cabezo; Fabiola Díaz; Willis García; Karen León; Sergio Mattey; Carlos Páez; Jonheluis Patete; Elvismar Rodríguez; Amarantha Urdaneta	Peru (PER); Yuliana Bolívar; Ariana Cornejo; Camila Figueroa; Yuta Galarreta; Brillith Gamarra; Noemi Huayhuameza; Xsara Morales; Juan Postigos; Javier Saavedra; Alonso Wong; Daryl Yamamoto	Dominican Republic (DOM); Albis Castro; Moira Morillo; José Manuel Nova; Antfernee Pepin; Elmert Ramírez; Omaira Ramírez; Coral Velásquez
