= Judo at the 2023 Pan American Games – Men's 90 kg =

Judo Men's 90 kg at the 2023 Pan American Games
- Venue: Contact Sports Center
- Location: Santiago, Chile
- Date: October 30
- Competitors: 10 from 9 nations
- Website: Official website

Medalists
gold medal	Iván Felipe Silva Morales (2nd title); Cuba
silver medal	Rafael Macedo; Brazil
bronze medal	Alexander Knauf; United States
bronze medal	Robert Florentino; Dominican Republic

Competition at external databases
- Links: IJF

The men's 90 kg competition of the judo events at the 2023 Pan American Games was held on October 30 at the Contact Sports Center (Centro de Entrenamiento de los Deportes de Contacto) in Santiago, Chile. A total of 10 athletes from 9 NOC's competed.

== Schedule ==
All times are local (UTC−3)

Date	Time	Event
Monday, 30 October 2023	10:00	Elimination round of 16
Monday, 30 October 2023	10:00	Quarterfinals
Monday, 30 October 2023	11:00	Repechage
Monday, 30 October 2023	11:00	Semifinals
Monday, 30 October 2023	15:00	Finals

== Results ==
=== Main Bracket ===
Round of 16
Carlos Páez (VEN)	10
Daniel Arancibia (CHI)	00
Ángel García (MEX)	00 (yellow card)
Mariano Coto (ARG)	10

Quarter-finals
Robert Florentino (DOM)	11
Alexander Knauf (USA)	00 (yellow card)
Rafael Macedo (BRA)	10 (yellow card)
Carlos Páez (VEN)	00
Iván Felipe Silva Morales (CUB)	10
Gerónimo Saucedo (USA)	00 (yellow card)
Daniel Paz (COL)	00
Mariano Coto (ARG)	10 (yellow card)

Semi-finals
Robert Florentino (DOM)	00
Rafael Macedo (BRA)	10 (yellow card)
Iván Felipe Silva Morales (CUB)	11
Mariano Coto (ARG)	00

Gold medal contest
Rafael Macedo (BRA)	00
Iván Felipe Silva Morales (CUB)	10 (yellow card)

=== Repechage ===
Repechage
Alexander Knauf (USA)	10
Carlos Páez (VEN)	00
Gerónimo Saucedo (USA)	00
Daniel Paz (COL)	01

Bronze medal contests
Alexander Knauf (USA)	10
Mariano Coto (ARG)	00
Daniel Paz (COL)	00
Robert Florentino (DOM)	10
