= Water skiing at the 2003 Pan American Games =

- Dates: 1–17 August 2003
- No. of events: 6

This page shows the results of the Water Ski Competition at the 2003 Pan American Games, held from 1 to 17 August 2003 in Santo Domingo, Dominican Republic. There were six events, three for both men and women, with Canada and the United States dominating the competition.

== Men's competition ==
=== Slalom ===
RANK	FINAL RANKING
1st place, gold medalist(s)	Drew Ross (CAN)
2nd place, silver medalist(s)	Jorge Suárez (MEX)
3rd place, bronze medalist(s)	Javier Julio (ARG)

=== Tricks ===
RANK	FINAL RANKING
1st place, gold medalist(s)	Jaret Llewellyn (CAN)
2nd place, silver medalist(s)	Russell Gay (USA)
3rd place, bronze medalist(s)	Jorge Ignacio (ARG)

=== Jump ===
RANK	FINAL RANKING
1st place, gold medalist(s)	Freddy Krueger (USA)
2nd place, silver medalist(s)	Jaret Llewellyn (CAN)
3rd place, bronze medalist(s)	Ryan Dodd (CAN)

== Women's competition ==
=== Slalom ===
RANK	FINAL RANKING
1st place, gold medalist(s)	Karen Truelove (USA)
2nd place, silver medalist(s)	Regina Jaquess (USA)
3rd place, bronze medalist(s)	Mariana Ramírez (MEX)

=== Tricks ===
RANK	FINAL RANKING
1st place, gold medalist(s)	Regina Jaquess (USA)
2nd place, silver medalist(s)	Rhoni Barton (USA)
3rd place, bronze medalist(s)	Mariana Ramírez (MEX)

=== Jump ===
RANK	FINAL RANKING
1st place, gold medalist(s)	Karissa Wedd (CAN)
2nd place, silver medalist(s)	Rhoni Barton (USA)
3rd place, bronze medalist(s)	Regina Jaquess (USA)

== Medal table ==
* Host nation (Dominican Republic)

Rank	Nation	Gold	Silver	Bronze	Total
1	United States	3	4	1	8
2	Canada	3	1	1	5
3	Mexico	0	1	2	3
4	Argentina	0	0	2	2
Totals (4 entries)		6	6	6	18
