= Water skiing at the 2026 Central American and Caribbean Games =

- Venue: Catalina Water Ski Lake
- Location: San Antonio de Guerra, Santo Domingo Province, Dominican Republic
- Dates: 25–28 July
- Competitors: 24 from 6 nations

The water skiing competition at the 2026 Central American and Caribbean Games was held in Catalina Water Ski Lake, San Antonio de Guerra, Santo Domingo Province, Dominican Republic, from 25 to 28 July 2026.

== Participating nations ==
A total of 6 nations qualified athletes. The number of athletes a nation entered is in parentheses beside the name of the country.

- Colombia (6)
- Dominican Republic (6)
- El Salvador (2)
- Guatemala (2)
- Mexico (6)
- Turks and Caicos Islands (2)

== Medal table ==
* Host nation (Dominican Republic)

Rank	Nation	Gold	Silver	Bronze	Total
1	Colombia (COL)	4	6	2	12
2	Dominican Republic (DOM)*	3	3	6	12
3	Mexico (MEX)	3	1	2	6
Totals (3 entries)		10	10	10	30

== Medal summary ==
=== Men's water skiing ===
Event	Gold	Silver	Bronze
Jump	Andrea Pigozzi; Dominican Republic	Sebastián Martínez; Colombia	Paolo Pigozzi; Dominican Republic
Slalom	Robert Pigozzi; Dominican Republic	Andrea Pigozzi; Dominican Republic	Carlos Lamadrid; Mexico
Tricks	Patricio Font; Mexico	Pablo Font; Mexico	Pablo Alvira; Colombia
Overall	Paolo Pigozzi; Dominican Republic	Andrea Pigozzi; Dominican Republic	Patricio Font; Mexico

=== Women's water skiing ===
Event	Gold	Silver	Bronze
Jump	Martina Piedrahita; Colombia	Daniela Verswyvel; Colombia	Francesca Pigozzi; Dominican Republic
Slalom	Daniela Verswyvel; Colombia	Francesca Pigozzi; Dominican Republic	Martina Piedrahita; Colombia
Tricks	Daniela Verswyvel; Colombia	Martina Piedrahita; Colombia	Francesca Pigozzi; Dominican Republic
Overall	Daniela Verswyvel; Colombia	Martina Piedrahita; Colombia	Francesca Pigozzi; Dominican Republic

=== Wakeboarding ===
Event	Gold	Silver	Bronze
Men	Pablo Monroy; Mexico	Jorge Rocha; Colombia	Willem Bouma; Dominican Republic
Women	Natasha Landsmanas; Mexico	Luciana Toro; Colombia	Andrea Reyes; Dominican Republic
