= Athletics at the 2023 Pan American Games – Women's shot put =

Women's shot put at the 2023 Pan American Games
- Venue: Julio Martínez National Stadium
- Dates: November 2
- Competitors: 11 from 9 nations
- Winning distance: 19.19

Medalists
| Gold medal | Sarah Mitton | Canada |
| Silver medal | Rosa Ramírez | Dominican Republic |
| Bronze medal | Adelaide Aquilla | United States |

The women's shot put competition of the athletics events at the 2023 Pan American Games took place on November 2 at the Julio Martínez National Stadium.

== Records ==
Prior to this competition, the existing world and Pan American Games records were as follows:

| World record | Natalya Lisovskaya (URS) | 22.63 | Moscow, Soviet Union | June 7, 1987 |
| Pan American Games record | Danniel Thomas-Dodd (JAM) | 19.55 | Lima, Peru | August 9, 2019 |

== Schedule ==
| Date | Time | Round |
|---|---|---|
| November 2, 2023 | 18:15 | Final |

== Results ==
All marks shown are in meters.

| KEY: | q | Fastest non-qualifiers | Q | Qualified | NR | National record | PB | Personal best | SB | Seasonal best | DQ | Disqualified |

=== Final ===
The results were as follows:

| Rank | Name | Nationality | #1 | #2 | #3 | #4 | #5 | #6 | Mark | Notes |
|---|---|---|---|---|---|---|---|---|---|---|
| 1st place, gold medalist(s) | Sarah Mitton | Canada | 18.90 | 18.87 | 19.02 | x | 19.19 | 19.19 | 19.19 | |
| 2nd place, silver medalist(s) | Rosa Ramírez | Dominican Republic | 17.79 | 17.01 | 17.13 | 17.99 | 17.16 | 17.87 | 17.99 | |
| 3rd place, bronze medalist(s) | Adelaide Aquilla | United States | 17.73 | x | x | 17.54 | 17.54 | 17.71 | 17.73 | |
| 4 | Layselis Jiménez | Cuba | 16.37 | 16.33 | 16.85 | 16.58 | 16.49 | 16.25 | 16.85 | |
| 5 | Ana Caroline da Silva | Brazil | 16.29 | 16.46 | x | 16.50 | x | 16.70 | 16.70 | |
| 6 | Lloydricia Cameron | Jamaica | x | 16.08 | 16.15 | 16.52 | x | 16.63 | 16.63 | |
| 7 | Natalia Duco | Chile | 16.42 | 16.47 | 15.78 | x | 16.40 | 16.58 | 16.58 | |
| 8 | Livia Avancini | Brazil | 16.44 | 16.36 | 16.45 | 16.12 | 16.54 | 16.32 | 16.54 | |
| 9 | Ahymara Espinoza | Venezuela | 14.96 | 15.97 | x | | | | 15.97 | |
| 10 | Kelsie Murrell-Ross | Grenada | 15.88 | 15.84 | x | | | | 15.88 | |
| 11 | Ivana Gallardo | Chile | 15.27 | x | 15.30 | | | | 15.30 | |
