= Water skiing at the 2022 Bolivarian Games =

Water skiing competitions at the 2022 Bolivarian Games

- Water skiing pictogram
- Venue: Club Los Lagartos
- Dates: 2–4 July 2022
- Competitors: 18 from 4 nations

Champions
- Chile (5 gold, 4 silver, 2 bronze)

Water skiing competitions at the 2022 Bolivarian Games in Valledupar, Colombia were held from 2 to 4 July 2022 at Club Los Lagartos in Bogotá, a sub-venue outside Valledupar.

Eight medal events were scheduled to be contested in four disciplines; jump, tricks, slalom and overall for each men and women. A total of 18 athletes (10 men and 8 women) competed in the events. The water skiers who participated in the events had to be at least 12 years old.

It was planned that a wakeboard event for both men and women would be held, but finally did not take place.

Colombia were the water skiing competitions defending champions after having won them in the previous edition in Santa Marta 2017. Chile obtained 5 of the 8 gold medals at stake to win the water skiing competitions.

== Participating nations ==
A total of 4 nations (3 ODEBO nations and 1 invited) registered athletes for the water skiing competitions. Each nation was able to enter a maximum of 12 water skiers (6 per gender).

- Chile (8 athletes)
- Colombia (4)
- Dominican Republic (2)
- Peru (4)

== Venue ==
The water skiing competitions were held at Club Los Lagartos in Bogotá.

== Medal summary ==
=== Medal table ===
* Host nation (Host nation)

Rank	Nation	Gold	Silver	Bronze	Total
1	Chile	5	4	2	11
2	Peru	1	2	4	7
3	Colombia	1	2	2	5
4	Dominican Republic	1	0	0	1
Totals (4 entries)		8	8	8	24

Source: Bolivarianos Valledupar 2022 – Water skiing medals

=== Medalists ===
==== Men's events ====
Event	Gold	Silver	Bronze
Jump	Emile Ritter; Chile	Martín Labra; Chile	Rafael De Osma; Peru
Slalom	Robert Pigozzi; Dominican Republic	Santiago Correa; Colombia	Juan Luis Piwonka; Chile
Tricks	Matías González; Chile	Martín Labra; Chile	Rafael De Osma; Peru
Overall	Martín Labra; Chile	Rafael De Osma; Peru	Martin Verswyvel; Colombia

==== Women's events ====
Event	Gold	Silver	Bronze
Jump	Agustina Varas; Chile	Maria Alejandra De Osma; Peru	Daniela Verswyvel; Colombia
Slalom	Maria Alejandra De Osma; Peru	Daniela Kretschmer; Chile	Dominga González; Chile
Tricks	Daniela Verswyvel; Colombia	Dominga González; Chile	Cristhiana De Osma; Peru
Overall	Agustina Varas; Chile	Daniela Verswyvel; Colombia	Maria Alejandra De Osma; Peru
