= Louisiana Ragin' Cajuns water skiing =

American college water ski team

Louisiana Ragin' Cajuns water ski
- Founded: 1988
- League: NCWSA
- Based in: Lafayette, Louisiana
- Colors: Vermilion and white
- Head coach: Ryan Gonzales
- Championships: 12 (1995, 1997, 2003, 2005, 2010, 2015, 2019, 2021, 2022, 2023, 2024, 2025)
- Website: Ragin' Cajuns water ski

The Louisiana Ragin' Cajuns water ski program is a co-ed collegiate water ski team that represents the University of Louisiana at Lafayette in the National Collegiate Water Ski Association. It is one of the two most successful college programs in the sport's history, having won 12 national championships – in 1995, 1997, 2003, 2005, 2010, 2015, 2019, 2021, 2022, 2023, 2024, and 2025. Since 1993, it has finished no lower than third place at any national championships.

As of November 2025, it has not lost a competition since 2019.

== History ==
The team's primary rival is the University of Louisiana at Monroe, the only squad with more national titles than the Ragin' Cajuns. Between 1993 and 2025, the two Louisiana schools split 30 of the 31 national championships awarded. (The 2020 championship was not held due to the COVID-19 pandemic.) The sole non-Louisiana champion in that span was Arizona State, in 2001.

Water skiing is not a sport organized by the National Collegiate Athletic Association (NCAA), so Louisiana's squad operates as a club sport, within the National Collegiate Water Ski Association and USA Water Ski & Wake Sports. The team's head coach since 2011 is Ryan Gonzales, a native of New Iberia, Louisiana.

The team draws recruits internationally and is one of the few universities to offer scholarships for water skiers. Its 2023 national championship team included members from Argentina, Austria, Canada, Germany, Italy, New Zealand, Switzerland, the United Kingdom, and the United States. In the 2021 IWWF World Waterski Championships, nearly one-sixth of all competitors were either current or former Ragin' Cajuns skiers.
