= Robert Pigozzi =

Dominican water skier (born 1997)

Robert Pigozzi Perdomo
Personal information
- Born: 13 September 1997 (age 28) Santo Domingo
- Education: Universidad APEC

Sport
- Country: Dominican Republic
- Sport: Waterskiing

Robert Pigozzi
Medal record

Men's water skiing

Representing the Dominican Republic

Pan American Games
Gold medal – first place	2019 Lima	Slalom
Silver medal – second place	2023 Santiago	Slalom

Central American and Caribbean Games
Gold medal – first place	2026 Santo Domingo	Slalom

Bolivarian Games
Gold medal – first place	2017 Santa Marta	Slalom
Gold medal – first place	2022 Valledupar	Slalom

Robert Pigozzi Perdomo (born 13 September 1997) is a Dominican water skier. He won the gold medal in Water skiing at the 2019 Pan American Games and the silver in 2023. He has won gold medals in the 2017 and the 2022 Bolivarian Games.

== Personal and early life ==
His parents are Mario Pigozzi, Italian and Niurkys Perdomo. He started practicing water skiing guided by his father. In his early years he also practiced football and baseball. He studied digital communications at Universidad APEC.

He is sponsored by Nautique Boats since 2019.

== Career ==
=== 2015—2016 ===
He became 2015 World Junior Waterski Championships, held at Bujama, Peru setting a U17 world record with the 3.50/58/10.75 mark from the first round. He participated in the Water skiing at the 2015 Pan American Games, ranking sixth in the preliminary round and eight in the final of the slalom competition.

Because of his 2015 and 2016 results, the International Waterski & Wakeboard Federation selected him to participate in the 2017 World Games.

=== 2017 ===
Pigozzi competed in the 2017 World Games, ranking ninth at the qualification with 1.0b/18.25m and ending up in seventh place in the final with 4.0b/11.25m in slalom. He won the 2017 Bolivarian Games slalom competition gold medal, setting a games record in his category.

=== 2018 ===
Pigozzi won the U21 Pan American Championships held in Chile, setting a new record with 1.5/58/10.25 mark. He finished in second place in the Open category, qualifying for the 2019 Pan American Games. He became the first Latin American water skier to qualify for the Masters Water Ski Tournament. At the Botaski Pro-Am World, held at the Seseña Waterski Complex, Spain, he set an U21 world record with a 1.00/58/9.75 mark in the first round of the competition, that he ended up in seventh place. He was the eighth athlete and the younger ever to achieve the 41 off record.

=== 2019—2021 ===
He won the National Championships with a 2.00/58/10.75 mark. At the XXXVII Latin American Championships held in Chile, he won his fifth consecutive title, when he marked a 4 @ 10.75. He qualified for the Open Masters for second consecutive time in the Orlando, Florida qualifier. He announced that he would spend the month of June competing in Europe to get in shape for the upcoming regional games.

In the Pan American Games, he won the gold medal of the slalom competition after having 2.50/58/10.25 in the preliminary round and 2.50/58/10.25 in the final round. He would later recall this winning as the one who make him notable at home, because this is the kind of competition that really matters for his home country.

He won the 2021 Dominican Republic Athlete of the Year award awarded by the Dominican Republic Olympic Committee and winning to fellow athletes: karate practitioner María Dimitrova, judoka Ana Rosa García and volleyball player Bethania de la Cruz.

=== 2022 ===
During the 2022 Bolivarian Games, he won the slalom gold medal. In July, he represented the Dominican Republic at the 2022 World Games held in Birmingham, United States. He recorded 4.00/58/11.25 in the slalom's preliminary round and 1.50/58/11.25, ranking seventh in the final. He ranked eighth at the 2022 IWWF Waterski Pan American Championships with a 4,00/58/10.75 mark.

=== 2023 ===
Pigozzi won the National Championships setting a 4.50/58/11.25 mark. In May, at Groveland, Florida he qualified for the Open Masters for the fifth time in Slalom.

He represented his home country and selected to carry the national flag at the Parade of Nations of the 2023 Pan American Games along with Yvonne Losos de Muñiz. During the slalom competition, he scored 6.00/58/10.75 in the preliminary round and later scored 1.00/58/10.25 to win the silver medal.

=== 2026 ===
During the Central American and Caribbean Games slalom competition, he led a 1-2 finish for the Dominican Republic alongside his brother Andrea with a 6.00/58/11.25 mark.

== Achievements ==
=== World records ===
World Records
3.50@58/10.75	11 January 2015	World Junior Championships	Bujama, Peru

=== Major titles ===
Major slalom titles
World Junior Championship Titles	2015
Pan American Games	2019
Latin American Championships	2016, 2017, 2018, 2019
National Championships	2018, 2019, 2023
