= Tae-Ku Park =

Canadian taekwondo athlete

Personal information
- Nationality: Canadian
- Born: 27 March 2001 (age 25) Winnipeg, Manitoba, Canada
- Home town: Winnipeg, Manitoba, Canada
- Weight: 74 kg (163 lb)
- Relative: Skylar Park

Sport
- Country: Canada
- Sport: Taekwondo
- Event: –74 kg
- Club: TRP Academy
- Team: CAN
- Coached by: Jae Park
Medal record
Men's taekwondo
Representing Canada
Pan American Games
Bronze medal – third place	2023 Santiago	68 kg
- Updated on 24 October 2023

Tae-Ku Park (born 27 March 2001) is a Canadian taekwondo athlete. Park won a bronze medal at the 2023 Pan American Games in Santiago.

Park's father is Korean and his mother was born in Chile and is of Italian heritage. His family has 16 black belts in taekwondo and the sport was practiced by his grandparents, his father, aunts, cousins, and brothers. His sister Skylar Park won gold at the same 2023 Pan American Games where he won his bronze, becoming the first siblings in the sport to medal at the same Pan American Games.
