= Natalia Cuglievan =

Peruvian water skier (born 1997)

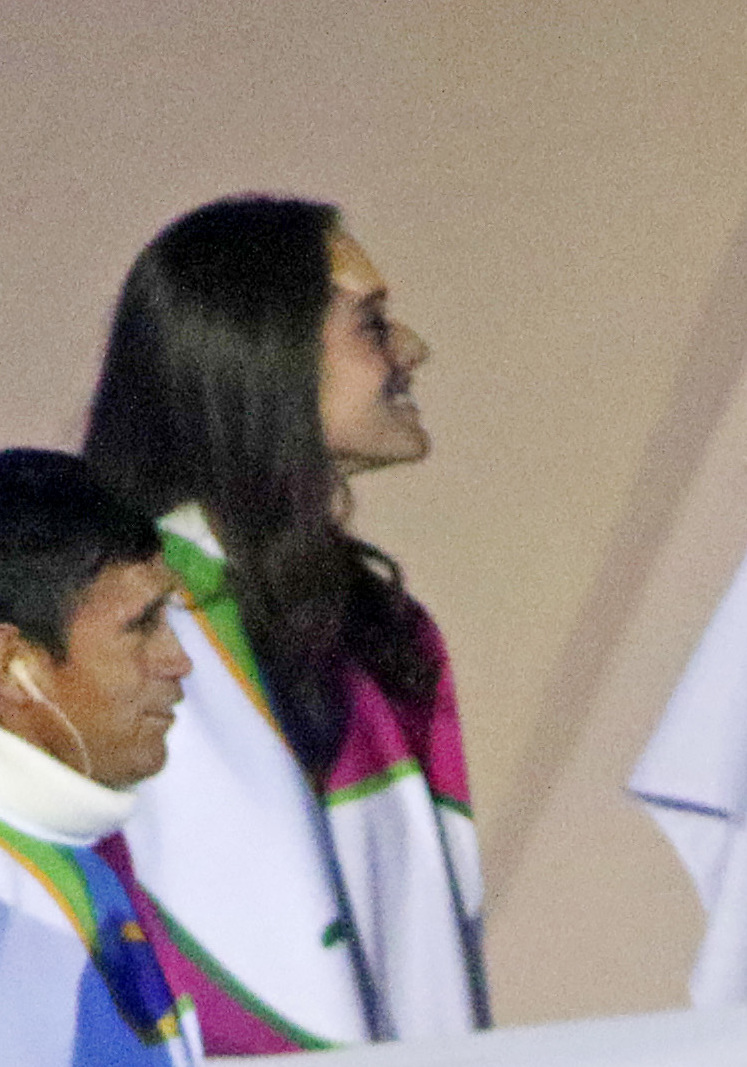

Personal information
- National team: Peru
- Born: 20 January 1997 (age 29)
Medal record
Representing Peru
Pan American Games
Women's tricks
Gold medal – first place	2015 Toronto
Gold medal – first place	2019 Lima

Natalia Cuglievan (born 20 March 1997) is a Peruvian water skier. She won gold medals for Peru at the 2015 and 2019 Pan American Games.

== Biography ==
Natalia Cuglievan was born on 20 March 1997 in Peru. She began water skiing in 2005, practising at Club Bujama Lacus, 83 km south of Lima. Her sister is María Cuglievan, who also competes in water skiing internationally.

== Career ==
=== 2011 Pan American Games ===
Cuglievan made her Pan American debut at the 2011 Pan American Games in Guadalajara, Mexico. She competed in the women's tricks event. In the preliminaries on 20 October, she came in fourth with a score of 5,960, qualifying for the finals. On 24 October, in the finals, she placed third in a tie with American Regina Jaquess with a score of 6,090. Their preliminary scores were used as a tie breaker — Jaquess won bronze with her initial score of 7,060, while Cuglievan took fourth place.

=== 2015 Pan American Games ===
Cuglievan competed at the 2015 Pan American Games in Toronto, Canada. In the women's tricks preliminaries at the Ontario Place West Channel, she placed third with a score of 7840. In the finals on 23 July, Cuglievan won Peru's third gold medal of the games, with 8300 points, 360 points ahead of Canadian Whitney McClintock and American Erika Lang,

=== 2019 Pan American Games ===
At the 2019 Pan American Games in Lima, Peru, Cuglievan competed in the women's tricks event, which took place at Club Bujama Lacus, the artificial lagoon where she began water skiing. In the preliminaries on 28 July, she placed fourth with a score of 7970, qualifying her for the finals. In the finals, she won gold and broke a Pan American record with a score of 9910, 190 points ahead of second place Erika Lang.

=== 2019 World Aquatic Ski Championships ===
At Putrajaya Lake in Putrajaya, Malaysia from August 13—18, 2019, Cuglievan participated in the women's tricks event at the Water Ski World Championships. She scored 9570 points, winning the silver medal behind first place American, Anna Gay, and in front of third place German, Giannina Bonnemann who scored 10530 and 8740 points respectively.
