= Moira Morillo =

Dominican Republic judoka (born 2001)

Personal information
- Born: 15 February 2001 (age 25) Santo Domingo
- Occupation: Judoka

Sport
- Country: Dominican Republic
- Sport: Judo
- Weight class: +78 kg

Achievements and titles
- Olympic Games: R32 (2024)
- World Champ.: R32 (2024, 2026)
- Pan American Champ.: (silver) (2026)
Medal record
Women's judo
Representing Dominican Republic
Pan American Games
| Bronze medal – third place | 2023 Santiago | +78 kg |
| Bronze medal – third place | 2023 Santiago | Mixed team |
Pan American Championships
| Silver medal – second place | 2026 Panama City | +78 kg |
| Bronze medal – third place | 2022 Lima | +78 kg |
| Bronze medal – third place | 2024 Rio de Janeiro | +78 kg |
Central American and Caribbean Games
| Silver medal – second place | 2023 San Salvador | Mixed team |
| Bronze medal – third place | 2018 Barranquilla | +78 kg |
| Bronze medal – third place | 2023 San Salvador | +78 kg |
Junior Pan American Games
| Silver medal – second place | 2021 Cali Valle | +78 kg |
| Bronze medal – third place | 2021 Cali Valle | Mixed team |
Pan American Junior Championships
| Bronze medal – third place | 2017 Cancún | +78 kg |

Profile at external databases
- IJF: 31371
- JudoInside.com: 113490
- Updated on 10 October 2026

Moira Yeilin Morillo Polanco (born 15 February 2001) is a female judoka from Santo Domingo, Dominican Republic.

Morillo is a 2022 Bolivarian Games gold medalist in the ‍–‍78 kg category and represented the Dominican Republic at the 2020 Summer Olympics.
