= Kreg Llewellyn =

Canadian water skier

Personal information
- Full name: Donald Kreg Llewellyn
- Nationality: Canada
- Born: August 11, 1967 Innisfail, Alberta
- Died: July 7, 2020 (aged 52)
- Height: 167 cm (5 ft 6 in)
- Weight: 68 kg (150 lb)
Medal record
Men's water skiing
Representing Canada
Pan American Games
| Silver medal – second place | 1995 Mar del Plata | Slalom |
| Silver medal – second place | 1999 Winnipeg | Slalom |

Donald Kreg Llewellyn (born August 11, 1967) was a Canadian water skier. Llewellyn won a silver medal in each of Pan American Games Champion when he won gold in men's water skiing events at the games in slalom at the 1995 Pan American Games as well as in 1999. He was inducted into the Alberta Sports Hall of Fame in 2019. Llewellyn was an innovator, having helped invent the skurfer a precursor to the wakeboard. Llewellyn held 24 Canadian records and won 7 individual World Championship medals. His brother Jaret Llewellyn is also a professional water skier with Pan American Games titles and his nephew Dorien Llewellyn is also a professional water skier.
