= Dominican Republic at the 2023 Pan American Games =

- IOC code: DOM
- NOC: Dominican Republic Olympic Committee

in Santiago, Chile 20 October 2023 – 5 November 2023
- Competitors: 161 in 22 sports
- Flag bearers (opening): Robert Pigozzi & Yvonne Losos de Muñiz
- Flag bearers (closing): José González & Pamela Rodríguez
- Medals Ranked 11th: Gold 8 Silver 7 Bronze 17 Total 32

Pan American Games appearances (overview)
- 1951; 1955; 1959; 1963; 1967; 1971; 1975; 1979; 1983; 1987; 1991; 1995; 1999; 2003; 2007; 2011; 2015; 2019; 2023

Dominican Republic competed at the 2023 Pan American Games in Santiago, Chile from October 20 to November 5, 2023. This was Dominican Republic's 18th appearance at the Pan American Games, having competed at every edition of the Games except 1963.

Water skier Robert Pigozzi and equestrian Yvonne Losos de Muñiz were the country's flagbearers during the opening ceremony. Meanwhile, track athlete José González and karateka Pamela Rodríguez were the country's flagbearers during the closing ceremony.

== Medalists ==
The following Dominican Republic competitors won medals at the games. In the by discipline sections below, medalists' names are bolded.

Medal	Name	Sport	Event	Date
Gold	Dahiana Ortiz	Weightlifting	Women's 49 kg	October 21
Gold	Mayerlin Mejía; Madelyn Rodríguez; Katherine Rodríguez	Taekwondo	Women's Kyorugi team	October 24
Gold	Audrys Nin Reyes	Gymnastics	Men's vault	October 25
Gold	Dominican Republic women's national volleyball team: Cándida Arias; Lisvel Elisa Eve; Vielka Peralta; Brenda Castillo; Niverka Marte; Yokaty Pérez; Yonkaira Peña; Bethania de la Cruz; Brayelin Martínez; Jineiry Martínez; Gaila González; Larysmer Martínez	Volleyball	Women's tournament	October 26
Gold	Yunior Alcantara	Boxing	Men's 51 kg	October 27
Gold	Ezequiel Suárez; Anabel Medina; Robert King; Marileidy Paulino	Athletics	Mixed 4 × 400 metres relay	October 30
Gold	José González	Athletics	Men's 100 metres	October 31
Gold	Marileidy Paulino	Athletics	Women's 200 metres	November 1
Silver	Bernando Pie	Taekwondo	Men's 68 kg	October 21
Silver	Jonathan Ruvalcaba	Diving	Men's 1 metre springboard	October 21
Silver	Robert Pigozzi	Water skiing	Men's slalom	October 23
Silver	Yudelina Mejía	Weightlifting	Women's 81 kg	October 23
Silver	Rosa Ramírez	Athletics	Women's shot put	November 1
Silver	José González	Athletics	Men's 200 metres	November 1
Silver	Mariana Pérez; Anabel Medina; Franshina Martínez; Marileidy Paulino	Athletics	Women's 4 × 400 metres relay	November 4
Bronze	Beatriz Pirón	Weightlifting	Women's 49 kg	October 21
Bronze	Crismery Santana	Weightlifting	Women's +81 kg	October 24
Bronze	José de los Santos	Boxing	Men's –57 kg	October 26
Bronze	Alexy de la Cruz	Boxing	Men's –63.5 kg	October 26
Bronze	Nick Hardt; Roberto Cid	Tennis	Men's doubles	October 28
Bronze	Medickson del Orbe	Judo	Men's –81 kg	October 29
Bronze	Robert Florentino	Judo	Men's −90 kg	October 30
Bronze	Eiraima Silvestre	Judo	Women's −78 kg	October 30
Bronze	Moira Morillo	Judo	Women's +78 kg	October 30
Bronze	José Nova	Judo	Men's +100 kg	October 30
Bronze	Antonio Tornal; Medickson del Orbe; Robert Florentino; José Nova; Eiraima Silvestre; Ana Rosa García; Ariela Sánchez; Estefania Soriano; Moira Morillo	Judo	Mixed Team	October 31
Bronze	Liranyi Alonso; Marileidy Paulino; Martha Méndez; Anabel Medina; Darianny Jiménez	Athletics	Women's 4 × 100 metres relay	November 1
Bronze	Larry Aracena	Karate	Men's individual Kata	November 3
Bronze	Pamela Rodríguez	Karate	Women's +68 kg	November 3
Bronze	Deury Corniel	Sailing	Men's kite	November 3
Bronze	Marysabel Senyu	Athletics	Women's high jump	November 4
Bronze	Ezequiel Suárez; Robert King; Ferdy Agramonte; Yeral Nuñez	Athletics	Men's 4 × 400 metres relay	November 4

== Competitors ==
The following is the list of number of competitors (per gender) participating at the games per sport/discipline.

Sport	Men	Women	Total
Badminton	2	2	4
Baseball	24	0	24
Basketball	4	4	8
Bowling	2	0	2
Boxing	6	6	12
Canoeing	2	0	2
Cycling	1	1	2
Equestrian			6
Football	18	0	18
Gymnastics	3	2	5
Handball	14	0	14
Judo	5	4	9
Karate	2	3	5
Modern pentathlon	2	2	4
Racquetball	0	2	2
Roller sports	1	1	2
Rowing	1	0	1
Sailing	3	0	3
Shooting	4	0	4
Table tennis	1	3	4
Taekwondo	3	2	5
Triathlon	1	1	2
Volleyball	12	12	24
Water skiing	3	1	4
Weightlifting	4	5	9
Wrestling	8	2	10
Total	126	53	179

== Archery ==
Women

Athlete	Event	Ranking Round		Round of 32	Round of 16	Quarterfinals	Semifinals	Final / BM	Rank
Athlete	Event	Score	Seed	Opposition Score	Opposition Score	Opposition Score	Opposition Score	Opposition Score	Rank
Santa Ortíz	Individual recurve	589	24	—N/a	Sepúlveda (COL); L 0–6	Did not advance			

== Athletics ==
Men
Track & road events

Athlete	Event	Semifinal		Final	
Athlete	Event	Time	Rank	Time	Rank
José González	100 m	10.30	1 Q	10.30	1st place, gold medalist(s)
Melbin Marcelino	100 m	10.59	18	Did not advance	
José González	200 m	20.81	2 Q	25.56	2nd place, silver medalist(s)
Yancarlos Martínez	200 m	21.30	9	Did not advance	
Ezequiel Suárez	400 m	47.40	9	Did not advance	
Ferdy Agramonte	800 m	1:47.55	5 q	DNF	
Luis Peralta	800 m	1:55.74	18	Did not advance	
Juander Santos	400 m h	52.64	13	Did not advance	
Yeral Nuñez	400 m h	51.27	6 Q	49.89	4
Yancarlos Martínez; José González; Melbin Marcelino; Christopher Valdez; Franquelo Pérez	4 × 100 m relay	DNF		Did not advance	
Yeral Nuñez; Juander Santos; Ezequiel Suárez; Ferdy Agramonte; Robert King	4 × 400 m relay	—N/a		3:05.98	3rd place, bronze medalist(s)
Álvaro Abreu	Marathon	—N/a		2:15:27	7

Combined events – Decathlon

Athlete	Event	100 m	LJ	SP	HJ	400 m	110H	DT	PV	JT	1500 m	Total	Rank
José Miguel Paulino	Result	11.04	7.54	13.18	1.95	49.70	14.72	37.72	3.40	56.15	4:50.70	7588	4
José Miguel Paulino	Points	852	945	678	758	828	884	618	771	680	614	7588	4

Women
Track events

Athlete	Event	Semifinal		Final	
Athlete	Event	Time	Rank	Time	Rank
Liranyi Alonso	100 m	11.69	6 Q	11.63	5
Marileidy Paulino	200 m	23.04	1 Q	22.74	1st place, gold medalist(s)
Martha Méndez	200 m	DNF		Did not advance	
Anabel Medina	400 m	DQ		Did not advance	
Franshina Martínez	400 m h	1:00.55	1 q	1:02.20	7
Darianny Jiménez; Anabel Medina; Marileidy Paulino; Franshina Martínez; Liranyi Alonso; Martha Méndez	4 × 100 m relay	45.05	8 q	44.32	3rd place, bronze medalist(s)
Marileidy Paulino; Franshina Martínez; Anabel Medina; Mariana Pérez	4 × 400 m relay	—N/a		3:34.27	2nd place, silver medalist(s)

Field events

Athlete	Event	Result	Rank
Marysabel Senyu	High jump	1.81	3rd place, bronze medalist(s)
Rosa Ramírez	Shot put	17.99	2nd place, silver medalist(s)

Mixed

Athlete	Event	Result	Rank
Anabel Medina; Mariana Pérez; Marileidy Paulino; Juander Santos; Ezequiel Suárez	4 × 400 metres relay	3:16.05	1st place, gold medalist(s)

== Badminton ==
Dominican Republic qualified a team of four athletes (two men and two women).

Men

Athlete	Event	First round	Second round	Quarterfinals	Semifinals	Final	Rank
Athlete	Event	Opposition Result	Opposition Result	Opposition Result	Opposition Result	Opposition Result	Rank
Ángel Mariñez	Singles	Miguel Quirama (COL)					
Yonatan Linarez	Singles	Manuel Mejia (ESA)					
Ángel Mariñez; Yonatan Linarez	Men's doubles	Juan Carlos Otaño (CUB); Roberto Herrera Vazquez (CUB)	—N/a				

Women

Athlete	Event	First round	Second round	Quarterfinals	Semifinals	Final	Rank
Athlete	Event	Opposition Result	Opposition Result	Opposition Result	Opposition Result	Opposition Result	Rank
Alisa Acosta	Singles	Bye	Nikté Sotomayor (EAI)				
Nairoby Abigail Jimenez	Singles	Bye	Wen Yu Zhang (CAN)				
Alisa Acosta; Nairoby Abigail Jimenez	Women's doubles	Eliana Zhang (CAN); Wen Yu Zhang (CAN)	—N/a				

Mixed

Athlete	Event	First round	Second round	Quarterfinals	Semifinals	Final	Rank
Athlete	Event	Opposition Result	Opposition Result	Opposition Result	Opposition Result	Opposition Result	Rank
Angel Marinez Ulloa; Alisa Juleisy Acosta	Mixed doubles	Bye					
Yonatan Linarez; Nairoby Abigail Jimenez	Mixed doubles	Nicolas Oliva (ARG); Ailen Oliva (ARG)					

== Baseball ==
Summary

Team	Event	Preliminary round				Semifinal	Final / BM / Pl.	
Team	Event	Opposition Result	Opposition Result	Opposition Result	Rank	Opposition Result	Opposition Result	Rank
Dominican Republic men	Men's tournament	Panama	Mexico	Chile				

Dominican Republic qualified a men's team (of 24 athletes) by finishing fourth in the 2023 Central American and Caribbean Games.

Group A

Pos	Team	Pld	W	L	RF	RA	PCT	GB	Qualification
1	Panama	3	3	0	18	3	1.000	—	Super Round
2	Mexico	3	2	1	19	8	.667	1	Super Round
3	Dominican Republic	3	1	2	13	7	.333	2	Fifth place game
4	Chile (H)	3	0	3	2	34	.000	3	Seventh place game

Source: Santiago 2023 and WBSC Americas
(H) Hosts

October 19; 9:30	Panama	4–1	Dominican Republic	Parque Bicentenario de Cerrillos, Cerrillos
October 19; 9:30		Boxscore		Parque Bicentenario de Cerrillos, Cerrillos

October 21; 9:30	Dominican Republic	0–1	Mexico	Parque Bicentenario de Cerrillos, Cerrillos
October 21; 9:30		Boxscore		Parque Bicentenario de Cerrillos, Cerrillos

October 23; 15:00	Chile	2–12 (F/5)	Dominican Republic	Parque Bicentenario de Cerrillos, Cerrillos
October 23; 15:00		Boxscore		Parque Bicentenario de Cerrillos, Cerrillos

== Basketball ==
3x3

=== Men's tournament ===
Dominican Republic qualified a men's team (of 4 athletes) by finishing 5th at the 2022 FIBA 3x3 Americup.

Summary

Team	Event	Preliminary round						Semifinal	Final / BM / Pl.	
Team	Event	Opposition Result	Opposition Result	Opposition Result	Opposition Result	Opposition Result	Rank	Opposition Result	Opposition Result	Rank
Dominican Republic men	Men's tournament									

=== Women's tournament ===
Dominican Republic qualified a women's team (of 4 athletes) by finishing as one of the six best non qualified teams in the FIBA 3x3 Rankings.

Summary

Team	Event	Preliminary round						Semifinal	Final / BM / Pl.	
Team	Event	Opposition Result	Opposition Result	Opposition Result	Opposition Result	Opposition Result	Rank	Opposition Result	Opposition Result	Rank
Dominican Republic women	Women's tournament									

== Beach volleyball ==
Athletes	Event	Preliminary round				Round of 16	Quarterfinals	Semifinals	Finals	Rank
Athletes	Event	Opposition Score	Opposition Score	Opposition Score	Rank	Opposition Score	Opposition Score	Opposition Score	Opposition Score	Rank
Bethania Almánzar; Julibeth Payano	Women's	Mongelos / Valiente (PAR); L (20–22, 16–21)	Humana-Paredes / Wilkerson (CAN); L (11–21, 11–21)	Acuña / Bianchi (URU); W (32–30, 21–19)	3 Q	Gallay / Pereyra (ARG); L (18–21, 15–21)	—N/a	9th-12th semifinals Simisterra / Vilela (COL); W (21-17, 21-14)	9th place match Rios / Guzmán (COL); W (21-13, 21-13)	9

== Bowling ==
Dominican Republic qualified a team of two men.

Athlete	Event	Qualification / Final																Round robin											Semifinal	Final / BM	
Athlete	Event	Block 1							Block 2							Total	Rank	Round robin											Semifinal	Final / BM	
Athlete	Event	1	2	3	4	5	6	Total	7	8	9	10	11	12	Total	Total	Rank	1	2	3	4	5	6	7	8	Total	Grand total	Rank	Opposition Result	Opposition Result	Rank
	Men's singles																														
	Men's doubles																	—N/a													

== Boxing ==
Dominican Republic qualified 12 boxers (six men and six women).

Men

Athlete	Event	Round of 32	Round of 16	Quarterfinals	Semifinals	Final	Rank
Athlete	Event	Opposition Result	Opposition Result	Opposition Result	Opposition Result	Opposition Result	Rank
Yunior Alcantara	–51 kg	—N/a	Parina (CAN); W 5–0	Castañeda (MEX); W 3–0	Hill (USA); W 4–1	Trindade (BRA); W WO	1st place, gold medalist(s)
José de los Santos	–57 kg	—N/a	Finol (VEN); W 4–1	Caicedo (ECU); W 5–0	Horta (CUB); L 1–4	Did not advance	3rd place, bronze medalist(s)
Alexy de la Cruz	–63.5 kg	—N/a	Williamson (GUY); W 5–0	Garcia (USA); W 2–0	Martínez (MEX); L 2–3	Did not advance	3rd place, bronze medalist(s)
Jhonny Fernández	—N/a	–71 kg	Arboleda (COL); L 0–5	Did not advance			
Cristian Pinales	–80 kg	—N/a	Gonzales (USA); W 3–2	Pereira (BRA); L 0–5	Did not advance		
Daniel Guzmán	–92 kg	—N/a	Hurtado (COL); L 0–5	Did not advance			

Women

Athlete	Event	Round of 32	Round of 16	Quarterfinals	Semifinals	Final	Rank
Athlete	Event	Opposition Result	Opposition Result	Opposition Result	Opposition Result	Opposition Result	Rank
Novoanny Nuñez	–50 kg	—N/a	Hinestroza (PAN); L 1–4	Did not advance			
Estefany Almanzar	–54 kg	—N/a	Chagas (BRA); L 2–3	Did not advance			
Miguelina Hernández	–57 kg	—N/a	Arboleda (COL); L 0–5	Did not advance			
Jessica Muñoz	–60 kg	—N/a	Saputo (ARG); L 0–5	Did not advance			
María Moronta	–66 kg	—N/a	Imbert (CUB); W RSC	dos Santos (BRA); L 0–5	Did not advance		
Milena Jiménez	–75 kg	—N/a	Thibeault (CAN); L RSC	Did not advance			

== Canoeing ==
=== Sprint ===
Dominican Republic qualified a total of two male sprint canoeists.

Men

Athlete	Event	Heat		Semifinal		Final	
Athlete	Event	Time	Rank	Time	Rank	Time	Rank
Antonely Viloria	C-1 1000 m	4:39.78	5 SF	4:33.32	6 FB	4:29.87	10
José Miguel Jiménez	K-1 1000 m	4:26.34	8 S2	4:19.88	6 FB	4:14.05	14

== Cycling ==
Dominican Republic qualified 1 cyclist at the Caribbean Championships. Dominican Republic also qualified 1 cyclist at the Pan American Championships.

=== Road ===
Athlete	Event	Time	Rank
Steven Polanco	Men's road race	3:48:30	26
Flor Espiritusanto	Women's road race	3:17:34	33

== Diving ==
Men

Athlete	Event	Preliminary		Final	
Athlete	Event	Score	Rank	Score	Rank
Jonathan Ruvalcaba	1 m springboard	374.40	2 Q	384.90	2nd place, silver medalist(s)
Frandiel Gómez	1 m springboard	317.20	12 Q	335.00	10
Jonathan Ruvalcaba	3 m springboard	419.65	3 Q	379.85	8
Frandiel Gómez	3 m springboard	345.30	12 Q	381.25	7
Jonathan Ruvalcaba; Frandiel Gómez	3 m synchro	—N/a		364.71	4
Jonathan Ruvalcaba; Frandiel Gómez	10 m synchro platform	—N/a		DNS	

Women

Athlete	Event	Preliminary		Final	
Athlete	Event	Points	Rank	Points	Rank
Victoria Garza	1 m springboard	201.60	14	Did not advance	
Victoria Garza	10 m Platform	246.95	12 Q	265.85	9

== Equestrian ==
Dominican Republic qualified a team of four equestrians in Jumping and two individuals in Dressage.

=== Dressage ===
Athlete	Horse	Event	Qualification						Grand Prix Freestyle / Intermediate I Freestyle	
Athlete	Horse	Event	Grand Prix / Prix St. Georges		Grand Prix Special / Intermediate I		Total		Grand Prix Freestyle / Intermediate I Freestyle	
Athlete	Horse	Event	Score	Rank	Score	Rank	Score	Rank	Score	Rank
Yvonne Losos de Muniz	Aquamarijn	Individual								
Stephanie Engstrom	Resperanzo	Individual								

=== Jumping ===
Athlete	Horse	Event	Qualification								Final					
Athlete	Horse	Event	Round 1		Round 2		Round 3		Total		Round A		Round B		Total	
Athlete	Horse	Event	Faults	Rank	Faults	Rank	Faults	Rank	Faults	Rank	Faults	Rank	Faults	Rank	Faults	Rank
		Individual														

== Football ==
Dominican Republic qualified a men's team of 18 athletes after finishing as the top ranked Caribbean team at the 2022 CONCACAF U-20 Championship.

=== Men's tournament ===
Summary

Key:

- A.E.T – After extra time.
- P – Match decided by penalty-shootout.

Team	Event	Group Stage				Semifinal	Final / BM	
Team	Event	Opposition Score	Opposition Score	Opposition Score	Rank	Opposition Score	Opposition Score	Rank
Dominican Republic men's	Men's tournament							

== Gymnastics ==
=== Artistic ===
Dominican Republic qualified four gymnasts in artistic (two men and two women) at the 2023 Pan American Championships.

Men

Athlete	Event	Qualification						Total	Rank
Athlete	Event	F	PH	R	V	PB	HB	Total	Rank
Audrys Nin Reyes	Individual all-around	13.266	11.900	12.633	14.000 Q	13.600	13.566 Q	78.965	10 Q
Leandro Peña	Individual all-around			12.500	6.333		12.766		

Qualification Legend: Q = Qualified to apparatus final

Individual finals

Athlete	Event	Apparatus						Total	
Athlete	Event	F	PH	R	V	PB	HB	Score	Rank
Audrys Nin Reyes	All-around	13.233	12.400	13.066	14.600	13.333	13.533	80.165	5
Audrys Nin Reyes	Vault	—N/a			14.466	—N/a			1st place, gold medalist(s)
Audrys Nin Reyes	Horizontal bar	—N/a					12.266	—N/a	7

Women

Athlete	Event	Qualification				Total	Rank
Athlete	Event	V	UB	BB	F	Total	Rank
Ana Fuentes	Individual all-around	11.966	8.666	6.033	10.533	37.198	37
Camil Betances	Individual all-around	12.633 Q	10.533	9.333	10.066	42.565	35

Qualification Legend: Q = Qualified to apparatus final

Individual Finals

Athlete	Event	Apparatus				Total	
Athlete	Event	F	BB	V	UB	Score	Rank
Camil Betances	Vault	—N/a		12.349	—N/a		6

=== Trampoline ===
Dominican Republican qualified one male gymnast in trampoline at the 2023 Pan American Championships.

Athlete	Event	Qualification		Final	
Athlete	Event	Score	Rank	Score	Rank
Junior Mateo	Men's	30.730	12	Did not advance	

== Handball ==
Summary

Team	Event	Group stage				Semifinal	Final / BM / Pl.	
Team	Event	Opposition Result	Opposition Result	Opposition Result	Rank	Opposition Result	Opposition Result	Rank
Dominican Republic men	Men's tournament	Chile; L 21–30	Brazil	Mexico				

=== Men's tournament ===
Dominican Republic qualified a men's team (of 14 athletes) by reaching the final of the 2023 Central American and Caribbean Games.

Group A

Pos	Team	Pld	W	D	L	GF	GA	GD	Pts	Qualification
1	Brazil	3	3	0	0	117	67	+50	6	Semifinals
2	Chile (H)	3	2	0	1	90	72	+18	4	Semifinals
3	Mexico	3	1	0	2	66	102	−36	2	5–8th place semifinals
4	Dominican Republic	3	0	0	3	60	92	−32	0	5–8th place semifinals

Source: Santiago 2023
Rules for classification: 1) points; 2) head-to-head points; 3) head-to-head goal difference; 4) head-to-head goals scored; 5) goal difference; 6) goals scored; 7) draw.
(H) Hosts

30 October 2023; 20:00	Chile	30–21	Dominican Republic	Gimnasio Polideportivo de Viña del Mar; Referees: Correa, Conberse (ARG)
30 October 2023; 20:00	Salgado 7	(12–10)	Beras 6	Gimnasio Polideportivo de Viña del Mar; Referees: Correa, Conberse (ARG)
30 October 2023; 20:00	6× (suspension)	Report	1× (yellow card) 3× (suspension) 1× (red card)	Gimnasio Polideportivo de Viña del Mar; Referees: Correa, Conberse (ARG)

31 October 2023; 17:30	Dominican Republic	20–36	Brazil	Gimnasio Polideportivo de Viña del Mar; Referees: Reyes, Zuñiga (CUB)
31 October 2023; 17:30	Beras 6	(11–18)	Hackbarth 7	Gimnasio Polideportivo de Viña del Mar; Referees: Reyes, Zuñiga (CUB)
31 October 2023; 17:30	1× (suspension)	Report		Gimnasio Polideportivo de Viña del Mar; Referees: Reyes, Zuñiga (CUB)

1 November 2023; 17:30	Dominican Republic	19–26	Mexico	Gimnasio Polideportivo de Viña del Mar; Referees: Magalhães, Godoy (BRA)
1 November 2023; 17:30	Soto 5	(7–13)	Morales 6	Gimnasio Polideportivo de Viña del Mar; Referees: Magalhães, Godoy (BRA)
1 November 2023; 17:30	6× (suspension) 1× (red card)	Report	2× (suspension)	Gimnasio Polideportivo de Viña del Mar; Referees: Magalhães, Godoy (BRA)

== Judo ==
Dominican Republic has qualified 9 judokas (five men and four women).

Men

Athlete	Event	Round of 16	Quarterfinals	Semifinals	Repechage	Final / BM	
Athlete	Event	Opposition Result	Opposition Result	Opposition Result	Opposition Result	Opposition Result	Rank
Elmert Ramírez	−66 kg	Bye	Postigos (PER); L 00S2–01S2	Did not advance	Preciado (ECU); L 00S1–10S1	Did not advance	
Antonio Tornal	−73 kg	Mattey (VEN); W 01S1–00S2	Estrada (CUB); W 01S2–00S2	Falcão (BRA); L 00S3–10S1	Bye	Bouchard (CAN); L 00S1–10S1	4
Medickson del Orbe	−81 kg	Bye	Morales (ARG); W 11S1–01S1	Schimidt (BRA); L 00S2–10S2	Bye	Aprahamian (URU); W 01S1–00S2	3rd place, bronze medalist(s)
Robert Florentino	−90 kg	Bye	Knauf (USA); W 11–00S1	Macedo (BRA); L 00–10S1	Bye	Paz (COL); W 12–00	3rd place, bronze medalist(s)
José Nova	+100 kg	Bye	del Sol (MEX); W 22S1–00S1	Granda (CUB); L 00S1–10S2	Bye	Figueroa (ECU); W 10–00S3	3rd place, bronze medalist(s)

Women

Athlete	Event	Round of 16	Quarterfinals	Semifinals	Repechage	Final / BM	
Athlete	Event	Opposition Result	Opposition Result	Opposition Result	Opposition Result	Opposition Result	Rank
Estefanía Soriano	−57 kg	Lasso (COL); L 00S3–11	Did not advance				
Ana Rosa García	−57 kg	Bye	Cancela (USA); W 10S1–00S3	Gómez (ARG); L 00S3–11	Bye	Jiménez (PAN); L 00–01S2	4
Ariela Sánchez	−63 kg	Golden (USA); L 01–10	Did not advance				
Eiraima Silvestre	−78 kg	Bye	Godbout (CAN); W 01S1–00	Colón (PUR); L 00–12	Bye	Cardona (CUB); W 10–00	3rd place, bronze medalist(s)
Moira Morillo	+78 kg	Bye	Bolívar (PER); W 10–00S3	Ortiz (CUB); L 00S2–12S2	Bye	Marenco (NCA); W 10S1–00S3	3rd place, bronze medalist(s)

Mixed

Athlete	Event	Round of 16	Quarterfinal	Semifinal	Repechage	Final / BM	
Athlete	Event	Opposition Result	Opposition Result	Opposition Result	Opposition Result	Opposition Result	Rank
Antonio Tornal; Medickson del Orbe; Robert Florentino; José Nova; Eiraima Silvestre; Ana Rosa García; Ariela Sánchez; Estefania Soriano; Moira Morillo	Team	Bye	Chile; W 4–0	Cuba; L 2–4	Bye	Argentina; W 4–1	3rd place, bronze medalist(s)

== Karate ==
Dominican Republic qualified a team of five karatekas (two men and three women) in the 2023 Central American and Caribbean Championship and the 2023 Pan American Championships.

Kumite

Athlete	Event	Round robin					Semifinal	Final	
Athlete	Event	Opposition Result	Opposition Result	Opposition Result	Opposition Result	Rank	Opposition Result	Opposition Result	Rank
Anel Castillo	Men's +84 kg	Rojas (CHI); L 0–4	Fernades (BRA); L 3–6	Irr (USA); L 2–5	Molina (ARG); W 5–0	4	Did not advance		
Penélope Polanco	Women's -50 kg	Salazar (VEN); L 0–3	Lahyanssa (CAN); L 0–2	Vega (CHI); L 8–1	—N/a	3	Did not advance		
Pamela Rodríguez	Women's +68 kg	Padilha (BRA); L 3–5	González (CHI); W 8–1	Fernández (PER); W 5–2	Torres (COL); L 2–2	2	Echever (ECU); L 6–11	Did not advance	3rd place, bronze medalist(s)

Kata

Athlete	Event	Pool round 1		Pool round 2		Final / BM	
Athlete	Event	Score	Rank	Score	Rank	Opposition Result	Rank
Larry Aracena	Men's individual					Bronze medal match Ferreira (BRA); W 39.70–39.20	3rd place, bronze medalist(s)
María Dimitrova	Women's individual	0	7	Did not advance			

== Modern pentathlon ==
Dominican Republic qualified four modern pentathletes (two men and two women).

Athlete	Event	Fencing (Épée one touch)				Swimming (200 m freestyle)			Riding (Show jumping)			Shooting / Running (10 m laser pistol / 3000 m cross-country)			Total	
Athlete	Event	V – D	Rank	MP points	BP	Time	Rank	MP points	Penalties	Rank	MP points	Time	Rank	MP points	MP points	Rank
Brayan Almonte	Men's individual															
Gabriel Domínguez	Men's individual															
Brayan Almonte; Gabriel Domínguez	Men's relay															
Ana Leidys Arias	Women's individual															
Ceclia Fermín	Women's individual															
Ana Leidys Arias; Cecilia Fermín	Women's relay															
Gabriel Domínguez; Cecilia Fermín	Mixed relay															

== Racquetball ==
Dominican Republic qualified two female racquetball athletes.

Athlete	Event	Preliminary round				Round of 16	Quarterfinal	Semifinal	Final	
Athlete	Event	Opposition Result	Opposition Result	Opposition Result	Rank	Opposition Result	Opposition Result	Opposition Result	Opposition Result	Rank
María Céspedes	Women's singles									
Merynanyelly Delgado	Women's singles									
María Céspedes; Merynanyelly Delgado	Women's doubles									
María Céspedes; Merynanyelly Delgado	Women's team	—N/a								

== Roller sports ==
=== Figure ===
Dominican Republic qualified two athletes in figure skating (one per gender).

Athlete	Event	Short program		Long program		Total	
Athlete	Event	Score	Rank	Score	Rank	Score	Rank
Micaela Marcelloni	Women's	31.26	8	46.84	9	78.66	9

== Rowing ==
Dominican Republic qualified a male rower.

Men

Athlete	Event	Heat		Repechage		Semifinal		Final A/B	
Athlete	Event	Time	Rank	Time	Rank	Time	Rank	Time	Rank
Ignacio Vásquez	Single sculls	7:37:01	8 R	7:24.27	3 SA/B	7:33.26	8 FB	7:29.63	9

== Sailing ==
Dominican Republic qualified 3 boats for a total of 3 sailors.

Men

Athlete	Event	Race													Total	
Athlete	Event	1	2	3	4	5	6	7	8	9	10	11	12	M	Points	Rank
Samuel Antonio Pérez	IQFoil	7	6	5	8	6	6	8	9	7	5	5	7	—N/a	82	6
Esneiry Pérez	Sunfish	7	6	5	6	6	7	5	5	7	3	8	6	—N/a	77	9
Deury Corniel	Kite	3	4	4	2	2	3	4	2	4	3	3	4	3	40	3rd place, bronze medalist(s)

== Shooting ==
Dominican Republic qualified a total of four shooters in the 2022 Americas Shooting Championships.

Men

Shotgun

Athlete	Event	Qualification		Final	
Athlete	Event	Points	Rank	Points	Rank
Domingo Nicolás Lorenzo	Trap	105	20	Did not advance	
Eduardo Lorenzo	Trap	109	16	Did not advance	
Stefano Hazoury	Skeet	110	16	Did not advance	
Julio Dujarric	Skeet	112	14	Did not advance	

== Swimming ==
Men

Athlete	Event	Heat		Final	
Athlete	Event	Time	Rank	Time	Rank
Juan Diego Núñez	10 km open water	—N/a		2:06:15.2	21

== Table tennis ==
Dominican Republic qualified a team of four athletes (one man and three women) through the 2023 Special Qualification Event.

Men

Athlete	Event	Group stage				First round	Second round	Quarterfinal	Semifinal	Final / BM	
Athlete	Event	Opposition Result	Opposition Result	Opposition Result	Rank	Opposition Result	Opposition Result	Opposition Result	Opposition Result	Opposition Result	Rank
Jiaji Wu	Singles	—N/a				Cifuentes (ARG); L 2-4	Did not advance				

Women

Athlete	Event	Group stage				First round	Second round	Quarterfinal	Semifinal	Final / BM	
Athlete	Event	Opposition Result	Opposition Result	Opposition Result	Rank	Opposition Result	Opposition Result	Opposition Result	Opposition Result	Opposition Result	Rank
Esmerlyn Castro	Singles	—N/a				Wang (CAN); L 1-4	Did not advance				
Eva Brito	Singles	—N/a				Zeng (CHI); L 2-4	Did not advance				
Esmerlyn Castro; Eva Brito	Doubles	—N/a						Bruna Takahashi; Giulia Takahashi (BRA); L 0-4	Did not advance		
Esmerlyn Castro; Eva Brito; Yasiris Ortíz	Team	—N/a	Puerto Rico; L 1-3	Cuba; L 1-3	9	—N/a		Did not advance			

Mixed

Athlete	Event	First Round	Quarterfinal	Semifinal	Final / BM	
Athlete	Event	Opposition Result	Opposition Result	Opposition Result	Opposition Result	Rank
Jiaji Wu; Yasiris Ortíz	Doubles	Jishan Liang; Lily Zhang (USA); L 0-4	Did not advance			

== Taekwondo ==
Dominican Republic qualified 5 athletes (three men and two women) during the Pan American Games Qualification Tournament.

Kyorugi

Men

Athlete	Event	Round of 16	Quarterfinals	Semifinals	Repechage	Final/ BM	
Athlete	Event	Opposition Result	Opposition Result	Opposition Result	Opposition Result	Opposition Result	Rank
Cristofer Reyes	–58 kg	Morales (PUR); W 2-0	Melo (BRA); L 0-2	Did not advance			
Bernardo Pie	–68 kg	Acuña (ARG); W 2-0	González (URU); W 2-0	Park (CAN); W 2-1	Bye	Harris (USA); L 0-2	2nd place, silver medalist(s)
Moisés Hernández	–80 kg	Olmedo (ARG); W 2-0	Trejos (COL); L 0-2	Did not advance	Calderón (CUB); L 1-2	Did not advance	
Cristofer Reyes; Bernardo Pie; Moisés Hernández	Team	—N/a	Ecuador; L 63-74	Did not advance			

Women

Athlete	Event	Round of 16	Quarterfinals	Semifinals	Repechage	Final / BM	
Athlete	Event	Opposition Result	Opposition Result	Opposition Result	Opposition Result	Opposition Result	Rank
Mayerlin Mejía	–57 kg	Cox (USA); L 0-1	Did not advance				
Madelyn Rodríguez	–67 kg	Velázquez (MEX); L 1-2	Did not advance				
Katherine Rodríguez	+67 kg	Weekes (PUR); L 0-2	Did not advance				
Mayerlin Mejía; Madelyn Rodríguez; Katherine Rodríguez	Team	—N/a	Colombia; W 63-66	Cuba; W 33-31	—N/a	Mexico; W 54-44	1st place, gold medalist(s)

== Tennis ==
Men

Athlete	Event	Round of 64	Round of 32	Round of 16	Quarterfinal	Semifinal	Final / BM	
Athlete	Event	Opposition Result	Opposition Result	Opposition Result	Opposition Result	Opposition Result	Opposition Result	Rank
Nick Hardt	Men's singles	Bye	Martínez (VEN); W 2–0 (6–1, 6–0)	Rubio (MEX); W 2–0 (7–6, 6–1)	Barrios (CHI); L 1–2 (6–2, 4–6, 4–6)	Did not advance		
Peter Bertran	Men's singles	Bye	Maginley (ANT); W 2–0 (6–4, 7–6)	Escobedo (MEX); L 0–2 (1–6, 3–6)	Did not advance			
Roberto Cid	Men's singles	Bye	Rodríguez-Pace (VEN); W 2–0 (6–2, 6–0)	Rubio (MEX); L 0–2 (5–7, 4–6)	Did not advance			
Nick Hardt; Roberto Cid	Men's doubles	—N/a			Vallejo / Vergara (PAR); W 2–1 (5–7, 6–4, 10-8)	Heide / Demoliner (BRA); L 0–2 (6–7, 3–6)	Crespo / Flores (CRC); W 2–1 (7–6, 4–6, 12-10)	3rd place, bronze medalist(s)

Women

Athlete	Event	Round of 64	Round of 32	Round of 16	Quarterfinal	Semifinal	Final / BM	
Athlete	Event	Opposition Result	Opposition Result	Opposition Result	Opposition Result	Opposition Result	Opposition Result	Rank
Ana Zamburek	Singles	Moyano (ARG); L 0–2 (5–7, 4–6)	Did not advance					
Kelly Williford	Singles	Bye	Labraña (CHI); L 1–2 (6–4, 1–6, 4–6)	Did not advance				
Kelly Williford; Ana Zamburek	Women's doubles	—N/a		Iamachkine / Pérez (PER); L 0–2 (3–6, 4–6)	Did not advance			

Mixed

Athlete	Event	Round of 64	Round of 32	Round of 16	Quarterfinal	Semifinal	Final / BM	
Athlete	Event	Opposition Result	Opposition Result	Opposition Result	Opposition Result	Opposition Result	Opposition Result	Rank
Kelly Williford; Peter Bertran	Mixed doubles	—N/a		Huertas / Ccuno (PER); L 0–2 (0–6, 2–6)	Did not advance			

== Triathlon ==
Dominican Republic qualified a triathlon team of two athletes (one man and one woman).

Athlete	Event	Swim (1.5 km)	Trans 1	Bike (40 km)	Trans 2	Run (10 km)	Total	Rank
Melvin Martínez	Men's individual	19:38	20:30	Did not finish				
Camila Romero	Women's individual	DNF						

== Volleyball ==
=== Men's tournament ===
Dominican Republic qualified a men's team (of 12 athletes) after being the best team from NORCECA at the 2021 Junior Pan American Games.

Summary

Team	Event	Group stage				Semifinal	Final / BM / Pl.	
Team	Event	Opposition Result	Opposition Result	Opposition Result	Rank	Opposition Result	Opposition Result	Rank
Dominican Republic men	Men's tournament	Chile; L 1–3	Argentina	Puerto Rico				

=== Women's tournament ===
Dominican Republic qualified a women's team (of 12 athletes) by winning the 2021 Women's Pan-American Volleyball Cup.

Summary

Team	Event	Group stage				Semifinal	Final / BM / Pl.	
Team	Event	Opposition Result	Opposition Result	Opposition Result	Rank	Opposition Result	Opposition Result	Rank
Dominican Republic women	Women's tournament	Chile; W 3–0	Mexico; W 3–0	Colombia; W 3–0	1 Q	Argentina; W 3–1	Brazil; W 3–0	1st place, gold medalist(s)

== Water skiing ==
Dominican Republic qualified four water skiers during the 2022 Pan American Water skiing Championship.

Men

Athlete	Event	Preliminary		Final				
Athlete	Event	Score	Rank	Slalom	Jump	Tricks	Total	Rank
Andrea Pigozzi	Slalom	3.00/58/11.25	11					
Paolo Pigozzi	Slalom	2.00/58/11.25	13					
Robert Pigozzi	Slalom	0.00/58/10.25	2 Q	Did not advance			1.00/58/10.25	2nd place, silver medalist(s)
Andrea Pigozzi	Jump							
Paolo Pigozzi	Jump							
Paolo Pigozzi	Overall					650		

Women

Athlete	Event	Preliminary		Final				
Athlete	Event	Score	Rank	Slalom	Jump	Tricks	Total	Rank
Francesca Pigozzi	Slalom	0.00/55/18.25	13					
Francesca Pigozzi	Jump	19.3	6					
Francesca Pigozzi	Tricks	1660	12					
Francesca Pigozzi	Overall							

== Weightlifting ==
Dominican Republic qualified nine weightlifters (four men and five women).

Men

Athlete	Event	Snatch		Clean & Jerk		Total	Rank
Athlete	Event	Result	Rank	Result	Rank	Total	Rank
Julio Cedeño	Men's 73 kg	141	4	165	7	306	5
Ray Reyes	Men's 89 kg	135	10	170	10	305	10
Confesor Santana	Men's 102 kg	140	13	175	12	315	13
Ezequiel Germán	Men's +102 kg	161	6	204	4	365	5

Women

Athlete	Event	Snatch		Clean & Jerk		Total	Rank
Athlete	Event	Result	Rank	Result	Rank	Total	Rank
Dahiana Ortiz	Women's 49 kg	83	3	107	1	190	1st place, gold medalist(s)
Beatriz Pirón	Women's 49 kg	84	1	97	3	181	3rd place, bronze medalist(s)
Daiana Serrano	Women's 71 kg	103	5	121	6	224	6
Yudelina Mejía	Women's 81 kg	111	2	133	3	244	2nd place, silver medalist(s)
Crismery Santana	Women's +81 kg	117	3	150	3	267	3rd place, bronze medalist(s)

== Wrestling ==
Dominican Republic qualified 10 wrestlers (eight men and two women) through the 2022 Pan American Wrestling Championships and the 2023 Pan American Wrestling Championships.

Key:

- VT – Victory by fall.
- PP – Decision by points – the loser with technical points.
- PO – Decision by points – the loser without technical points.
- SP – Technical superiority – the loser with technical points and a margin of victory of at least 9 (Greco-Roman) or 10 (freestyle) points.
- ST – Great superiority – the loser without technical points and a margin of victory of at least 8 (Greco-Roman) or 10 (freestyle) points.
- VA – Decision by withdrawal

Men

Athlete	Event	Quarterfinal	Semifinal	Final / BM	
Athlete	Event	Opposition Result	Opposition Result	Opposition Result	Rank
	Freestyle 65 kg				
	Freestyle 97 kg				
	Freestyle 125 kg				
	Greco-Roman 60 kg				
	Greco-Roman 67 kg				
	Greco-Roman 87 kg				
	Greco-Roman 97 kg				
	Greco-Roman 130 kg				

Women

Athlete	Event	Quarterfinal	Semifinal	Final / BM	
Athlete	Event	Opposition Result	Opposition Result	Opposition Result	Rank
	68 kg				
	76 kg				

== See also ==
- Dominican Republic at the 2023 Parapan American Games
- Dominican Republic at the 2024 Summer Olympics
