= Dorien Llewellyn =

Canadian water skier (born 1996)

Personal information
- Nationality: Canadian
- Born: May 16, 1996 (age 30) Orlando, Florida, United States
- Home town: Innisfail, Alberta
- Height: 172 cm (5 ft 8 in)
- Weight: 66 kg (146 lb)
Medal record
Men's water skiing
Representing Canada
World Championships
Gold medal – first place	2025 Recetto	Overall
Gold medal – first place	2021 Lake County	Trick
Gold medal – first place	2021 Lake County	Team
Gold medal – first place	2019 Putrajaya	Team
Silver medal – second place	2025 Recetto	Team
Silver medal – second place	2023 Lake County	Team
Silver medal – second place	2021 Lake County	Overall
Bronze medal – third place	2025 Recetto	Jump
Bronze medal – third place	2023 Lake County	Overall
Bronze medal – third place	2017 Paris	Team
Pan American Games
Gold medal – first place	2023 Santiago	Overall
Gold medal – first place	2019 Lima	Overall
Silver medal – second place	2023 Santiago	Tricks
Silver medal – second place	2023 Santiago	Jump
Silver medal – second place	2019 Lima	Trick
Bronze medal – third place	2019 Lima	Jump

Dorien Llewellyn (born May 16, 1996) is a Canadian water skier. Llewellyn was the Pan American Games Champion when he won gold in men's water skiing at the 2019 Pan Am Games in Lima. He also owns 21 national water skiing titles to his name. His father Jaret Llewellyn is an 11-time world champion, 12-time Pan American Games medalist, and owns a record 117 professional titles; while his uncle Kreg Llewellyn was also a professional water skier.

Llewellyn graduated from Rollins College with a physics degree in 2019. He then competed collegiately for the Louisiana Ragin' Cajuns water skiing team, leading the team to its 8th National Title with a gold medal in Men's Overall in 2021. During his time at the University of Louisiana at Lafayette, Llewellyn earned a master's degree in systems engineering.

Though the Llewellyn family calls Innisfail, Alberta home, they live and train in Orlando, Florida due to the fact they can train all year in Florida.
