= Jaret Llewellyn =

Canadian water skier

Personal information
- National team: Canada
- Born: July 27, 1970 (age 56) Innisfail, Alberta
- Height: 167 cm (5 ft 6 in)
- Weight: 68 kg (150 lb)
- Spouse: Britta Grebe

Sport
- Country: Canada
- Sport: Waterskiing
Medal record
Men's water skiing
Representing Canada
Pan American Games
| Gold medal – first place | 1999 Winnipeg | Tricks |
| Gold medal – first place | 2003 Santo Domingo | Tricks |
| Gold medal – first place | 2007 Rio de Janeiro | Jumps |
| Gold medal – first place | 2007 Rio de Janeiro | Tricks |
| Silver medal – second place | 1999 Winnipeg | Jumps |
| Silver medal – second place | 2003 Santo Domingo | Jumps |
| Silver medal – second place | 2015 Toronto | Tricks |
| Silver medal – second place | 2015 Toronto | Overall |

Jaret Llewellyn (born 27 July 1970) is a retired Canadian water skier. Llewellyn is a four-time Pan American Games Champion when he won gold in men's water skiing events at the games in 1999, 2003, and 2 gold at the 2007 games. He won two silver medals at the 2015 Pan American Games while competing at the age of 44, just one week shy of his birthday.

He is an 11-time world champion, 12-time Pan American Games medalist, and owns a record 117 professional titles. His son Dorien Llewellyn is also a professional water skier with Pan American Games titles and his older brother Kreg Llewellyn was also a professional water skier.

== Notable accomplishments ==
=== World records ===
World Jump Records
| 63.0 m | May 23, 1992 | Robin Lake | Pine Mountain, GA |
| 68.3 m | June 19, 1999 | Austin Aquaplex | Austin, TX |
| 70.3 m | August 29, 1999 | Lacanau | Lacanau France |
| 71.7 m | September 29, 2002 | McCormick's | Seffner, FL |

World Overall Records
| 2676.98 pts | August 7, 2000 | 3 @ 11.25 m | 10,740 pts | 66.8 m | Yarra River | Edmonton Canada |
| 2818.01 pts | September 29, 2002 | 5 @ 11.25 m | 10,730 pts | 71.7 m | McCormick's | Seffner, FL |

=== Major titles ===
Major Trick Titles
| World Championship Titles | 1999 |
| Moomba Masters Titles | 1999, 2004, 2005 |

Major jump titles
| World Championship Titles | 1999, 2001, 2005 |
| Pro Tour Titles | 1998, 1999, 2001 |
| Masters Titles | 1998, 2002, 2003, 2004 |
| Moomba Masters Titles | 2000, 2001, 2002, 2008, 2009 |
| U.S. Open Titles | 2007 |

Major Overall Titles
| World Championship Titles | 2001, 2007 |
| Masters Titles | 1992, 1993, 1999, 2000 |
