= Paige Rini =

Canadian water skier (born 2000)

Personal information
- Full name: Paige Louise Rini
- Nationality: Canadian
- Born: March 14, 2000 (age 26) Kissimmee, Florida, U.S.

Sport
- Country: Canada
- Sport: Water-skiing
Medal record
Pan American Games
Silver medal – second place	2023 Santiago	Overall
Bronze medal – third place	2019 Lima	Tricks
Bronze medal – third place	2019 Lima	Slalom
Bronze medal – third place	2019 Lima	Overall
Bronze medal – third place	2023 Santiago	Jump
Bronze medal – third place	2023 Santiago	Slalom

Paige Louise Rini (born March 14, 2000) is a Canadian water skier.

She competed at the 2019 Pan American Games where she won bronze medals in the tricks, slalom and overall events.

She is the stepdaughter of water-skier Whitney McClintock-Rini.
