= Whitney McClintock-Rini =

Canadian water skier (born 1989)

Personal information
- Born: October 2, 1989 (age 37) Cambridge, Ontario, Canada
- Height: 172 cm (5 ft 8 in)
- Weight: 62 kg (137 lb)

Sport
- Country: Canada
- Sport: Water skiing
Medal record
Women's water skiing
Representing Canada
World Championships
Gold medal – first place	2011 Dubna	Slalom
Gold medal – first place	2009 Calgary	Slalom
Gold medal – first place	2009 Calgary	Jump
Gold medal – first place	2009 Calgary	Overall
Gold medal – first place	2009 Calgary	Team
Silver medal – second place	2017 Paris	Slalom
Silver medal – second place	2015 Chapala	Slalom
Silver medal – second place	2015 Chapala	Overall
Silver medal – second place	2013 Santiago	Slalom
Silver medal – second place	2013 Santiago	Overall
Pan American Games
Gold medal – first place	2007 Rio de Janeiro	Tricks
Gold medal – first place	2011 Guadalajara	Tricks
Gold medal – first place	2015 Toronto	Slalom
Gold medal – first place	2015 Toronto	Overall
Silver medal – second place	2007 Rio de Janeiro	Jump
Silver medal – second place	2007 Rio de Janeiro	Slalom
Silver medal – second place	2011 Guadalajara	Slalom
Silver medal – second place	2011 Guadalajara	Jump
Silver medal – second place	2011 Guadalajara	Overall
Silver medal – second place	2015 Toronto	Jump
Silver medal – second place	2015 Toronto	Tricks
Silver medal – second place	2019 Lima	Jump
Silver medal – second place	2019 Lima	Slalom
Silver medal – second place	2019 Lima	Overall

Whitney McClintock (born October 2, 1989) is a Canadian water skier. She is a five time world champion. McClintock has also won thirteen Pan American Games medals (four gold and ten silver).

== Early life ==
McClintock was born October 2, 1989, in Cambridge, Ontario.

== Career ==
=== World Championships ===
McClintock has won multiple World Championships medals. In 2009 McClintock won four gold medals, in 2011 McClintock won a single gold and followed that up with two silvers in 2013.

=== Pan American Games ===
McClintock made her Pan American Games debut in 2007, where she won three medals (two gold and a silver). In 2011, McClintock won four medals (one gold and three silver). In June 2015, McClintock was named to her third Pan American Games team. At the 2015 games, McClintock again won four medals (two gold and two silver).

== Personal life ==
In 2018, she married Matt Rini, a Water-skiing coach, and her stepdaughter is water skier Paige Rini.
