= Water skiing at the 2023 Pan American Games =

- Water skiing pictogram
- Venue: Los Morros Lagoon
- Start date: October 21, 2023
- End date: October 24, 2023
- No. of events: 10 (5 men, 5 women)
- Competitors: 48 from 10 nations

Water skiing competitions at the 2023 Pan American Games in Santiago, Chile are scheduled to be held between October 21 and 24, 2023 at the Los Morros Lagoon.

There will be a total of ten events held, equally split among men and women.

== Qualification system ==
A total of 48 athletes will qualify to compete at the games. The host nation, Chile, automatically qualifies four athletes in water ski and two in wakeboard. The top seven nations at the 2022 Pan American Water Skiing Championship will each receive four athlete quotas. A further 7 spots are made available for wakeboard qualifiers in each event.

== Participating nations ==
A total of 10 countries qualified athletes. The number of athletes a nation entered is in parentheses beside the name of the country.

- Argentina (6)
- Brazil (4)
- Canada (6)
- Chile (6)
- Colombia (6)
- Dominican Republic (4)
- Mexico (6)
- Paraguay (2)
- Peru (2)
- United States (6)

== Medal summary ==
=== Medal table ===
* Host nation (Chile)

Rank	Nation	Gold	Silver	Bronze	Total
1	United States	5	1	3	9
2	Argentina	2	1	1	4
3	Canada	1	6	2	9
4	Chile*	1	1	3	5
5	Mexico	1	0	0	1
6	Dominican Republic	0	1	0	1
7	Brazil	0	0	1	1
Totals (7 entries)		10	10	10	30

=== Men's events ===
Event	Gold	Silver	Bronze
Jump	Emile Ritter; Chile	Dorien Llewellyn; Canada	Tobías Giorgis; Argentina
Slalom	Nate Smith; United States	Robert Pigozzi; Dominican Republic	Felipe Simioni; Brazil
Tricks	Patricio Font; Mexico	Dorien Llewellyn; Canada	Matías González; Chile
Overall	Dorien Llewellyn; Canada	Tobías Giorgis; Argentina	Martín Labra; Chile
Wakeboard	Kai Ditsch; Argentina	Hunter Smith; Canada	Daniel Johnson; United States

=== Women's events ===
Event	Gold	Silver	Bronze
Jump	Regina Jaquess; United States	Agustina Varas; Chile	Paige Rini; Canada
Slalom	Regina Jaquess; United States	Neilly Ross; Canada	Paige Rini; Canada
Tricks	Erika Lang; United States	Neilly Ross; Canada	Anna Gay; United States
Overall	Regina Jaquess; United States	Paige Rini; Canada	Anna Gay; United States
Wakeboard	Eugenia de Armas; Argentina	Mary Morgan Howell; United States	Ignacia Holscher; Chile
