= Nate Smith (water skier) =

American professional waterskier (born 1990)

Personal information
- Born: November 29, 1990 (age 35) Indianapolis, Indiana

Sport
- Country: United States
- Sport: Waterskiing
- Event: Slalom
Medal record
Men's water skiing
Representing United States
Pan American Games
Gold medal – first place	2023 Santiago	Slalom

Nate Smith (born November 29, 1990) is an American professional waterskier. Skiing professionally since 2010, Smith is the current slalom world record holder, setting the record on September 7, 2013 and then again tying the record on May 14, 2017. In addition to holding the world record, Smith has won 95 professional titles and 4 World Championships.

== Biography ==
Smith was born in Indianapolis. Skiing professionally since the 2010 season, on October 3 of that year he became the youngest skier to ever to compete at 41 off, scoring 3.50 and 5.00 @ 10.25 m. On June 2, 2013 he tied Chris Parrish's world record of 2.00 @ 9.75 m, and on September 7 of that same year broke the record with a score of 2.50 @ 9.75 m. He broke his own world record on May 14, 2017 at the Swiss Pro Slalom with 3.00 @ 9.75 m. The record was declined for irregular driving.

Nate Smith is sponsored by D3 Skis.

== Achievements ==
=== World records ===
World Records
2@43 off	June 2, 2013	Little Mountain	Maiden, NC
2.5@43 off	September 7, 2013	Covington Ski Ranch	Covington, LA

=== Major titles ===
Major slalom titles
World Championship Titles	2013, 2015, 2021, 2025
Masters Titles	2012, 2015, 2016, 2017, 2018, 2022, 2023
Moomba Masters Titles	2012, 2015, 2018, 2020, 2022, 2023
U.S. Open Titles	2021
