= Regina Jaquess =

American water skier (born 1984)

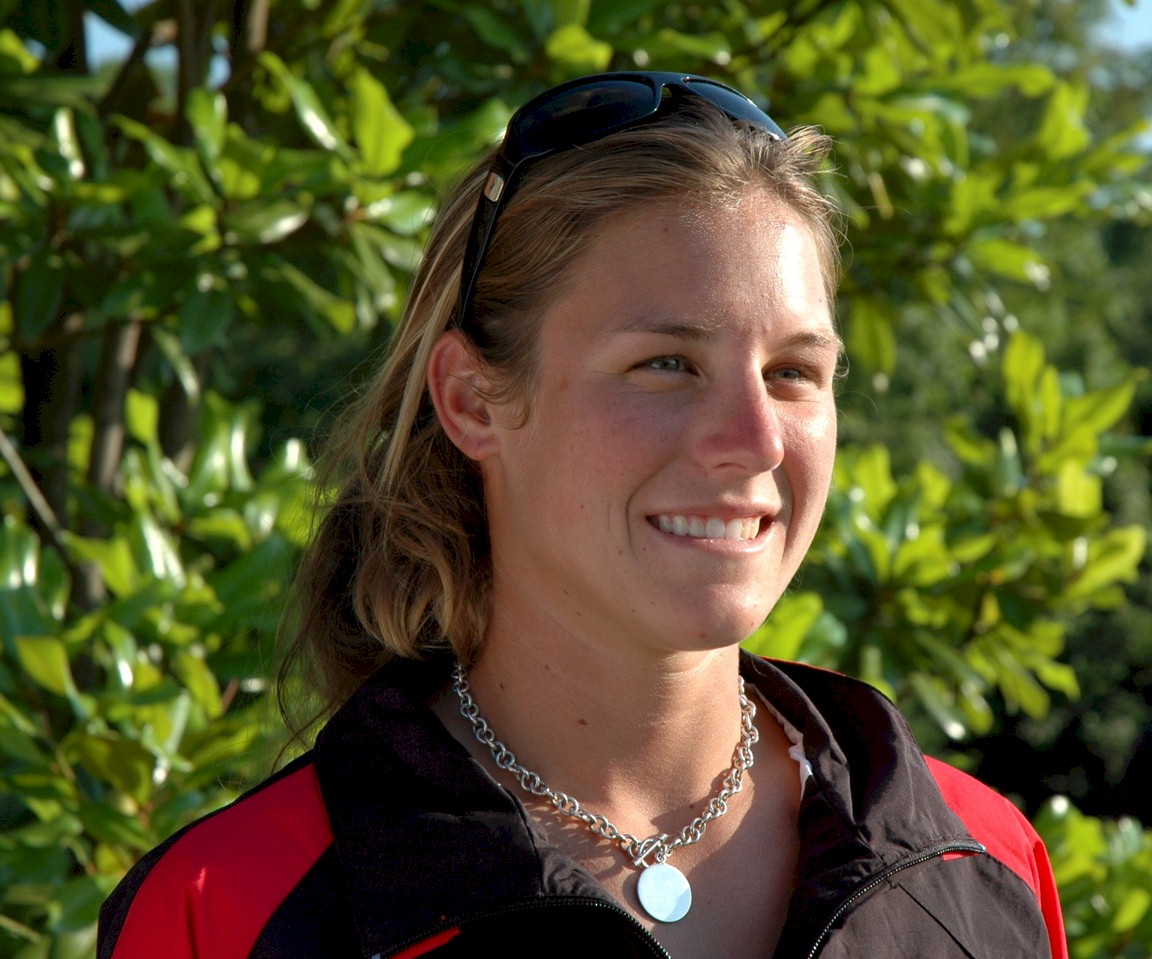

Personal information
- Born: June 7, 1984 (age 42) Duluth, Georgia
- Education: University of Louisiana at Monroe

Sport
- Country: United States
- Sport: Waterskiing

Regina Jaquess
Medal record

Women's water skiing

Representing United States

World Games
Gold medal – first place	2013 Cali	Jump
Gold medal – first place	2013 Cali	Slalom

Pan American Games
Gold medal – first place	2011 Guadalajara	Slalom
Gold medal – first place	2019 Lima	Jump
Gold medal – first place	2019 Lima	Slalom
Gold medal – first place	2019 Lima	Overall
Gold medal – first place	2023 Santiago	Jump
Gold medal – first place	2023 Santiago	Slalom
Gold medal – first place	2023 Santiago	Overall
Silver medal – second place	2003 Santo Domingo	Slalom

Regina Jaquess (born June 7, 1984) is an American water skier. She had won awards in the sport by age 13 and won medals in Water skiing at the 2003 Pan American Games. In that same year she won at the Water Ski World Championship. She won gold medals in Water skiing at the 2011 Pan American Games and for 2012–2013 was named "Female Slalom Skier of the Year" by Water Ski Magazine.

In December 2016, the International Waterski and Wakeboard Federation's (IWWF) Tournament Council approved Jaquess' November 5, 2016 world record of three and a half buoys at 10.25 meters (41' off) as part of the Malibu Boats team.

On July 6, 2019, Jaquess set a new world record of 4.5 buoys at 10.25 meters (41' off) during the Regina Jaquess Open II tournament at Lymanland in Duncanville, Alabama. The record was approved by the IWWF Tournament Council in July 2019.

== Notable accomplishments ==
=== World records ===
World Records
1@41 off	July 4, 2009	Shoreline Lakes	Santa Rosa Beach, FL
1.25@41 off	October 23, 2010	Shoreline Lakes	Santa Rosa Beach, FL
1.5@41 off	October 24, 2010	Shoreline Lakes	Santa Rosa Beach, FL
2@41 off	October 2, 2011	Shoreline Lakes	Santa Rosa Beach, FL
3@41 off	June 17, 2012	Cedar Ridge	Canton, MS
3.25@41 off	June 7, 2014	Cedar Ridge	Canton, MS
3.5@41 off	November 5, 2016	Isles of Lake Hancock	Winter Garden, FL
4@41 off	July 16, 2018	Isles of Lake Hancock	Winter Garden, FL
4.5@41 off	July 6, 2019	Lymanland USA	Duncanville, AL
5@41 off	September 22, 2023	Lymanland USA	Duncanville, AL

=== Major titles ===
Major slalom titles
World Championship Titles	2005, 2013, 2015, 2017
Masters Titles	2008, 2010, 2012, 2013, 2014, 2015, 2016, 2019, 2022, 2023
Pan American Games	2011, 2019

Major Trick Titles
Moomba Masters Titles	2003
Pan American Games	2003

Major jump titles
Pan American Games	2007, 2011, 2015, 2019

Major Overall Titles
World Championship Titles	2003, 2005, 2013, 2015, 2017
Pan American Games	2011, 2019
