= Judo at the 2023 Pan American Games – Mixed team =

Judo Mixed team at the 2023 Pan American Games
- Venue: Contact Sports Center
- Date: 31 October
- Competitors: 99 from 10 nations
- Website: Official website

Medalists
gold medal	Lianet Cardona; Liester Cardona; Omar Cruz; Magdiel Estrada; Andy Granda; Idelannis Gómez; Maikel McKenzie; Idalys Ortiz; Orlando Polanco; Iván Felipe Silva Morales; Maylín del Toro; (1st title)	Cuba
silver medal	Daniel Cargnin; Luana Carvalho; Aléxia Castilhos; Gabriel Falcão; Leonardo Gonçalves; Willian Lima; Rafael Macedo; Larissa Pimenta; Guilherme Schimidt; Rafael Silva; Rafaela Silva; Samanta Soares; Beatriz Souza	Brazil
bronze medal	Robert Florentino; Moira Morillo; Medickson del Orbe; Elmert Ramírez; Ana Rosa García; Ariela Sánchez; Eiraima Silvestre; Estefanía Soriano; Antonio Tornal	Dominican Republic
bronze medal	Francisco Balanta; Luisa Bonilla; Brigitte Carabalí; Daniel Paz; Andrés Sandoval; María Villalba	Colombia

Competition at external databases
- Links: JudoInside

The mixed team competition of the judo events at the 2023 Pan American Games was held on 31 October at the Contact Sports Center (Centro de Entrenamiento de los Deportes de Contacto) in Santiago, Chile.

It was the first time a mixed team event was contested, increasing the number of judo events from fourteen (all individual events) to fifteen.

== Schedule ==
All times are local (UTC−3)

Date	Time	Event
Tuesday, 31 October 2023	10:00	Elimination round of 16
Tuesday, 31 October 2023	10:00	Quarterfinals
Tuesday, 31 October 2023	11:00	Repechage
Tuesday, 31 October 2023	12:00	Semifinals
Tuesday, 31 October 2023	13:00	Finals

== Teams ==
Ten NOC's competed in group consisting of six to thirteen judokas.

Team	Judokas					
Argentina	Victoria Delvecchio	Agustina De Lucía	Brisa Gómez	Agustina Lahiton	Mariano Coto	Ivo Dargoltz
Argentina	Matteo Etchechury	Nicolás Gil	Tomás Morales	Joaquín Tovagliari		
Brazil	Willian Lima	Gabriel Falcão	Leonardo Gonçalves	Guilherme Schimidt	Rafael Macedo	Larissa Pimenta
Brazil	Rafael Silva	Rafaela Silva	Aléxia Castilhos	Luana Carvalho	Samanta Soares	Beatriz Souza
Brazil	Daniel Cargnin					
Chile	Juan Pablo Vega	Daniel Arancibia	Sebastián Pérez	Camila Lagos	Constanza Pérez	Elizabeth Segura
Chile	Judith González	Francisco Solis	Katherine Quevedo	Jorge Pérez	Thomas Briceño	Karina Venegas
Colombia	Brigitte Carabalí	Francisco Balanta	María Villalba	Luisa Bonilla	Daniel Paz	Andrés Sandoval
Cuba	Lianet Cardona	Idelannis Gómez	Liester Cardona	Omar Cruz	Magdiel Estrada	Andy Granda
Cuba	Maikel McKenzie	Orlando Polanco	Iván Silva	Maylín del Toro	Idalys Ortiz	
Dominican Republic	Ariela Sanchez	Eiraima Silvestre	Estefania Soriano	Moira Morillo	Medickson del Orde	Ana Rosa
Dominican Republic	Robert Florentino	José Nova	Elmert Ramirez	Antonio Tornal		
Ecuador	Junior Angulo	Juan Ayala	Luz Peña	Edith Ortiz	Bryan Garboa	Astrid Gavidia
Ecuador	Celinda Corozo	Aracelly Barrionuevo	Vanessa Chalá	Lenin Preciado	Freddy Figueroa	
Mexico	Sergio del Sol	Paulina Martínez	Edna Carrillo	Ángel García	Renata Ortíz	Gilberto Cardoso
Mexico	Prisca Awiti	Alexis Esquivel	Robin Jara	Samuel Ayala		
United States	Alexander Knauf	Mackenzie Williams	Mariah Holguin	Yasmin Alamin	Dominic Rodríguez	Philip Horiuchi
Venezuela	Iván Salas	Fabiola Díaz	Elvismar Rodríguez	Amarantha Urdeneta	Sergio Mattey	Carlos Paez
Venezuela	Luis Amézquita	María Giménez	Willis García			

== Results ==
=== Main Bracket ===
Round of 16
Chile	4
Ecuador	3

Quarter-finals
Brazil	4
Venezuela	1
Argentina	0
Colombia	4
Cuba	4
Mexico	1
Dominican Republic	4
Chile	0

Semi-finals
Brazil	4
Colombia	0
Cuba	4
Dominican Republic	2

Final
Brazil	3
Cuba	4

=== Repechage ===
Repechage
Venezuela	2
Argentina	4
Mexico	4
Chile	0

Bronze medal
Argentina	1
Dominican Republic	4
Mexico	2
Colombia	4

== Matches ==
=== Round of 16 ===
==== Chile vs Ecuador ====
Weight Class	Chile	Result	Ecuador	Score
Women +70 kg	Katherine Quevedo	00 – 10	Vanessa Chalá	0 – 1
Men +90 kg	Francisco Solis	10 – 00	Freddy Figueroa	1 – 1
Women –57 kg	Judith González	00 – 01	Astrid Gavidia	1 – 2
Men –73 kg	Sebastián Pérez	00 – 10	Lenin Preciado	1 – 3
Women –70 kg	Camila Lagos	10 – 00	Celinda Corozo	2 – 3
Men –90 kg	Daniel Arancibia	w/o – DNS	~~Celinda Corozo~~	3 – 3
Men –90 kg	Daniel Arancibia	w/o –	-none Men –90 kg-	4 – 3
Results

=== Quarter-finals ===
==== Brazil vs Venezuela ====
Weight Class	Brazil	Result	Venezuela	Score
Men +90 kg	Leonardo Gonçalves	10 – 00	Luis Amézquita	1 – 0
Women –57 kg	Rafaela Silva	11 – 00 (yellow card)	Fabiola Díaz	2 – 0
Men –73 kg	Gabriel Falcão	11 – 00	Sergio Mattey	3 – 0
Women -70 kg	Aléxia Castilhos	00 (yellow card) – 10	Elvismar Rodríguez	3 – 1
Men –90 kg	Guilherme Schimidt	10 – 00	Carlos Páez	4 – 1
Women +70 kg	Beatriz Souza	—	Amarantha Urdaneta	—
Results

==== Argentina vs Colombia ====
Weight Class	Argentina	Result	Colombia	Score
Men +90 kg	Ivo Dargoltz	00 – 10 (yellow card)	Francisco Balanta	0 – 1
Women –57 kg	Brisa Gómez	00 – 10 (yellow card)	María Villalba	0 – 2
Men –73 kg	Matteo Etchechury	00 – 10	Andrés Sandoval	0 – 3
Women -70 kg	Agustina De Lucía	00 – 10 (yellow card)	Luisa Bonilla	0 – 4
Men –90 kg	Mariano Coto	—	Daniel Paz	—
Women +70 kg	Victoria Delvecchio	—	Brigitte Carabalí	—
Results

==== Cuba vs Mexico ====
Weight Class	Cuba	Result	Mexico	Score
Men +90 kg	Andy Granda	10 (yellow card) – 00	Sergio del Sol	1 – 0
Women –57 kg	-none Women –57 kg-	DNS – w/o	Edna Carrillo	1 – 1
Men –73 kg	Magdiel Estrada	10 – 01	Robin Jara	2 – 1
Women -70 kg	Idelannis Gómez	10 – 00	Renata Ortiz	3 – 1
Men –90 kg	Iván Felipe Silva Morales	11 – 00 (yellow card)	Ángel García	4 – 1
Women +70 kg	Idalys Ortiz	—	Katia Castillo	—
Results

==== Dominican Republic vs Chile ====
Weight Class	Dominican Republic	Result	Chile	Score
Men +90 kg	Robert Florentino	10 (yellow card) – 01	Thomas Briceño	1 – 0
Women –57 kg	Ana Rosa García	10 – 00	Elizabeth Segura	2 – 0
Men –73 kg	Antonio Tornal	10 – 00 (yellow card)	Juan Pablo Vega	3 – 0
Women -70 kg	Ariela Sánchez	10 – 00	Camila Lagos	4 – 0
Men –90 kg	Medickson del Orbe	—	Daniel Arancibia	—
Women +70 kg	Eiraima Silvestre	—	Katherine Quevedo	—
Results

=== Repechages ===
==== Venezuela vs Argentina ====
Weight Class	Venezuela	Result	Argentina	Score
Women –57 kg	Fabiola Díaz	00 – 10	Brisa Gómez	0 – 1
Men –73 kg	Sergio Mattey	01 – 00	Matteo Etchechury	1 – 1
Women -70 kg	Elvismar Rodríguez	10 – 00	Agustina De Lucía	2 – 1
Men –90 kg	Carlos Páez	00 – 10	Mariano Coto	2 – 2
Women +70 kg	Amarantha Urdaneta	00 – 10 (yellow card)	Victoria Delvecchio	2 – 3
Men +90 kg	Luis Amézquita	00 (yellow card) – 01	Ivo Dargoltz	2 – 4
Results

==== Mexico vs Chile ====
Weight Class	Mexico	Result	Chile	Score
Women –57 kg	Paulina Martínez	11 – 00	Elizabeth Segura	1 – 0
Men –73 kg	Gilberto Cardoso	10 – 00	Sebastián Pérez	2 – 0
Women -70 kg	Prisca Awiti Alcaraz	10 – 00 (yellow card)	Camila Lagos	3 – 0
Men –90 kg	Samuel Ayala	10 – 00	Daniel Arancibia	4 – 0
Women +70 kg	Katia Castillo	—	Katherine Quevedo	—
Men +90 kg	Alexis Esquivel	—	Francisco Solis	—
Results

=== Semi-finals ===
==== Brazil vs Colombia ====
Weight Class	Brazil	Result	Colombia	Score
Women –57 kg	Rafaela Silva	10 (yellow card) – 00	María Villalba	1 – 0
Men –73 kg	Willian Lima	10 (yellow card) – 00 (yellow card)	Andrés Sandoval	2 – 0
Women -70 kg	Luana Carvalho	11 – 01	Luisa Bonilla	3 – 0
Men –90 kg	Rafael Macedo	10 – 00 (yellow card)	Daniel Paz	4 – 0
Women +70 kg	Beatriz Souza	—	Brigitte Carabalí	—
Men +90 kg	Rafael Silva	—	Francisco Balanta	—
Results

==== Cuba vs Dominican Republic ====
Weight Class	Cuba	Result	Dominican Republic	Score
Women –57 kg	-none Women –57 kg-	DNS – w/o	Ana Rosa García	0 – 1
Men –73 kg	Magdiel Estrada	01 – 11	Antonio Tornal	0 – 2
Women -70 kg	Idelannis Gómez	10 – 00	Ariela Sánchez	1 – 2
Men –90 kg	Iván Felipe Silva Morales	10 (yellow card) – 00	Robert Florentino	2 – 2
Women +70 kg	Idalys Ortiz	10 – 00	Moira Morillo	3 – 2
Men +90 kg	Andy Granda	10 – 00	José Nova	4 – 2
Results

=== Bronze medal matches ===
==== Argentina vs Dominican Republic ====
Weight Class	Argentina	Result	Dominican Republic	Score
Men –73 kg	Matteo Etchechury	00 (yellow card) – 10	Antonio Tornal	0 – 1
Women -70 kg	Agustina De Lucía	10 – 00 (yellow card)	Ariela Sánchez	1 – 1
Men –90 kg	Mariano Coto	00 – 10 (yellow card)	Robert Florentino	1 – 2
Women +70 kg	Victoria Delvecchio	00 (yellow card) – 10 (yellow card)	Eiraima Silvestre	1 – 3
Men +90 kg	Ivo Dargoltz	00 (yellow card) – 10	José Nova	1 – 4
Women –57 kg	Agustina Lahiton	—	Ana Rosa García	—
Results

==== Mexico vs Colombia ====
Weight Class	Mexico	Result	Colombia	Score
Men –73 kg	Robin Jara	00 – 10	Andrés Sandoval	0 – 1
Women -70 kg	Prisca Awiti Alcaraz	10 – 00	Luisa Bonilla	1 – 1
Men –90 kg	Ángel García	10 (yellow card) – 00	Daniel Paz	2 – 1
Women +70 kg	Katia Castillo	00 – 10	Brigitte Carabalí	2 – 2
Men +90 kg	Alexis Esquivel	00 (yellow card) – 10	Francisco Balanta	2 – 3
Women –57 kg	Paulina Martínez	00 – 10	María Villalba	2 – 4
Results

=== Gold medal match ===
==== Brazil vs Cuba ====
Weight Class	Brazil	Result	Cuba	Score
Men –73 kg	Gabriel Falcão	01 – 00	Magdiel Estrada	1 – 0
Women -70 kg	Luana Carvalho	00 – 10	Idelannis Gómez	1 – 1
Men –90 kg	Rafael Macedo	00 – 01 (yellow card)	Iván Felipe Silva Morales	1 – 2
Women +70 kg	Beatriz Souza	10 – 00	Idalys Ortiz	2 – 2
Men +90 kg	Rafael Silva	00 – 10	Andy Granda	2 – 3
Women –57 kg	Rafaela Silva	w/o – DNS	-none Women –57 kg-	3 – 3
Men +90 kg	Rafael Silva	00 – 10	Andy Granda	3 – 4
Results
