= Judo at the 2022 South American Games =

Judo competitions at the 2022 South American Games

- Venue: Pavilion 2 of SND
- Dates: October 11−13
- Nations: 11

Judo competitions at the 2022 South American Games in Asunción, Paraguay are scheduled to be held between October 11 and 13, 2022 at the Pavilion 2 of SND

== Schedule ==
The competition schedule is as follows:

Men
Date Event	Tue 11	Wed 12	Thu 13
Men's 60 kg	F		
Men's 66 kg	F		
Men's 73 kg	F		
Men's 81 kg		F	
Men's 90 kg		F	
Men's 100 kg		F	
Men's +100 kg		F	

F	Final

Mixed
Date Event	Tue 11	Wed 12	Thu 13
Mixed team			F

Women
Date Event	Tue 11	Wed 12	Thu 13
Women's 48 kg	F		
Women's 52 kg	F		
Women's 57 kg	F		
Women's 63 kg	F		
Women's 70 kg		F	
Women's 78 kg		F	
Women's +78 kg		F	

== Medal summary ==
=== Medal table ===
* Host nation (Paraguay)

Rank	Nation	Gold	Silver	Bronze	Total
1	Brazil (BRA)	6	3	4	13
2	Ecuador (ECU)	3	0	3	6
3	Venezuela (VEN)	2	5	4	11
4	Peru (PER)	2	2	1	5
5	Chile (CHI)	1	2	2	5
6	Argentina (ARG)	1	1	8	10
7	Colombia (COL)	0	2	5	7
8	Uruguay (URU)	0	0	2	2
9	Paraguay (PAR)*	0	0	1	1
Totals (9 entries)		15	15	30	60

=== Medalists ===
==== Men ====
Event	Gold	Silver	Bronze
60 kg	Juan Ayala; Ecuador	Iván Salas; Venezuela	Michel Augusto; Brazil
60 kg	Juan Ayala; Ecuador	Iván Salas; Venezuela	John Futtinico; Colombia
66 kg	Ronald Lima; Brazil	Willis García; Venezuela	Lenin Preciado; Ecuador
66 kg	Ronald Lima; Brazil	Willis García; Venezuela	Rodrigo Jara; Argentina
73 kg	Alonso Wong; Peru	Jonas Ribeiro; Brazil	Sergio Mattey; Venezuela
73 kg	Alonso Wong; Peru	Jonas Ribeiro; Brazil	Arkangel Barboza; Colombia
81 kg	Agustin Nicolas Gil; Argentina	Jorge Pérez; Chile	Kauan dos Santos; Brazil
81 kg	Agustin Nicolas Gil; Argentina	Jorge Pérez; Chile	Franklin Gamou; Uruguay
90 kg	Yuta Galarreta; Peru	Mariano Coto; Argentina	Alain Mikael Aprahamian; Uruguay
90 kg	Yuta Galarreta; Peru	Mariano Coto; Argentina	Wilgner Mendes; Brazil
100 kg	Gabriel Dezani; Brazil	Antonio Rodríguez; Venezuela	Daryl Yamamoto; Peru
100 kg	Gabriel Dezani; Brazil	Antonio Rodríguez; Venezuela	Thomas Briceño; Chile
+100 kg	Freddy Figueroa; Ecuador	Luis Amézquita; Venezuela	Francisco Solis; Chile
+100 kg	Freddy Figueroa; Ecuador	Luis Amézquita; Venezuela	Joaquin Alejo; Argentina

==== Women ====
Event	Gold	Silver	Bronze
48 kg	Mary Dee Vargas; Chile	Erika Lasso; Colombia	María Giménez; Venezuela
48 kg	Mary Dee Vargas; Chile	Erika Lasso; Colombia	Gabriela Narváez; Paraguay
52 kg	Thayná Lemos; Brazil	Judith González; Chile	Fabiola Díaz; Venezuela
52 kg	Thayná Lemos; Brazil	Judith González; Chile	Agustina Lahiton; Argentina
57 kg	Gabrielle Gonzaga; Brazil	Marian Flores; Peru	Astrid Gavidia; Ecuador
57 kg	Gabrielle Gonzaga; Brazil	Marian Flores; Peru	Brisa Candela; Argentina
63 kg	Anriquelis Barrios; Venezuela	Cindy Mera; Colombia	Gabriella Moraes; Brazil
63 kg	Anriquelis Barrios; Venezuela	Cindy Mera; Colombia	Agustina De Lucía; Argentina
70 kg	Celinda Corozo; Ecuador	Millena Silva; Brazil	Luisa Bonilla; Colombia
70 kg	Celinda Corozo; Ecuador	Millena Silva; Brazil	Lucia Cantero; Argentina
78 kg	Elvismar Rodríguez; Venezuela	Beatriz Freitas; Brazil	Vanessa Chalá; Ecuador
78 kg	Elvismar Rodríguez; Venezuela	Beatriz Freitas; Brazil	Brenda Olaya; Colombia
+78 kg	Giovanna Santos; Brazil	Amarantha Urdaneta; Venezuela	Brigitte Carabalí; Colombia
+78 kg	Giovanna Santos; Brazil	Amarantha Urdaneta; Venezuela	Amanda Bredeston; Argentina

==== Mixed ====
Event	Gold	Silver	Bronze
Team	Brazil; Alexia Nascimento; Beatriz Freitas; Gabriel Dezani; Gabriella Moraes; Gabrielle Gonzaga; Giovanna Santos; Guilherme Cabral; Jonas Ribeiro; Kauan dos Santos; Michel Augusto; Millena Silva; Ronald Lima; Thayná Lemos; Wilgner Mendes	Peru; Camila Figueroa; Daryl Yamamoto; Dilmer Calle; Alonso Wong; Javier Saavedra Bobadilla; Juan Postigos; Marian Flores; Yuta Galarreta; Thalia Gamarra; Xsara Morales	Venezuela; Amarantha Urdaneta; Anriquelis Barrios; Antonio Rodríguez; Carlos Paez Mendoza; Elvismar Rodríguez; Fabiola Díaz; Iván Salas; Jonheluis Patete; Kady Cabezo; Luis Amézquita; María Giménez; Sergio Mattey; Willis García
Team	Brazil; Alexia Nascimento; Beatriz Freitas; Gabriel Dezani; Gabriella Moraes; Gabrielle Gonzaga; Giovanna Santos; Guilherme Cabral; Jonas Ribeiro; Kauan dos Santos; Michel Augusto; Millena Silva; Ronald Lima; Thayná Lemos; Wilgner Mendes	Peru; Camila Figueroa; Daryl Yamamoto; Dilmer Calle; Alonso Wong; Javier Saavedra Bobadilla; Juan Postigos; Marian Flores; Yuta Galarreta; Thalia Gamarra; Xsara Morales	Argentina; Agustin Nicolas Gil; Agustina Lahiton; Agustina De Lucía; Amanda Bredeston; Anahi Galeano; Brisa Candela; Ingrid Perafán; Ivo Dargoltz; Joaquin Alejo; Lucia Cantero; Mariano Coto; Rodrigo Jara

== Participation ==
Eleven nations will participate in judo events of the 2022 South American Games.

- Argentina
- Bolivia
- Brazil
- Chile
- Colombia
- Ecuador
- Panama
- Paraguay
- Peru
- Uruguay
- Venezuela

== Results ==
=== Men's 60kg ===
Main Bracket

Round of 16
(Paraguay) Mateo Ortiz	01
(Ecuador) Juan Ayala	10 (yellow card)

Quarter-finals
(Colombia) John Futtinico	00
(Ecuador) Juan Ayala	10 (yellow card)
(Peru) Dilmer Calle	10
(Bolivia) Alejandro Zamudio	00
(Venezuela) Iván Salas	01
(Brazil) Michel Augusto	00 (yellow card)
(Panama) Bernabé Vergara	10
(Chile) Lucas Fernández	00

Semi-finals
(Ecuador) Juan Ayala	10
(Peru) Dilmer Calle	00
(Venezuela) Iván Salas	10
(Panama) Bernabé Vergara	00

Gold medal contest
(Ecuador) Juan Ayala	10
(Venezuela) Iván Salas	00

Repechage

Repechage
(Colombia) John Futtinico	10
(Bolivia) Alejandro Zamudio	00
(Brazil) Michel Augusto	01
(Chile) Lucas Fernández	00 (yellow card)

Bronze medal contests
(Colombia) John Futtinico	10
(Panama) Bernabé Vergara	00
(Brazil) Michel Augusto	10
(Peru) Dilmer Calle	00

=== Men's 66kg ===
Main Bracket

Round of 16
(Paraguay) Ezequiel Duarte	00
(Brazil) Ronald Oliveira	11 (yellow card)

Quarter-finals
(Peru) Juan Postigos	00
(Chile) Juan Pérez	01 (yellow card)
(Ecuador) Lenin Preciado	00
(Brazil) Ronald Oliveira	01 (yellow card)
(Colombia) Juan Hernández	01
(Argentina) Rodrigo Jara	00 (yellow card)
(Venezuela) Willis García	01
(Uruguay) Agustín Durán	00 (yellow card)

Semi-finals
(Chile) Juan Pérez	00
(Brazil) Ronald Oliveira	10 (yellow card)
(Colombia) Juan Hernández	00
(Venezuela) Willis García	11 (yellow card)

Gold medal contest
(Brazil) Ronald Oliveira	10
(Venezuela) Willis García	00

Repechage

Repechage
(Peru) Juan Postigos	00
(Ecuador) Lenin Preciado	01 (yellow card)
(Argentina) Rodrigo Jara	01
(Uruguay) Agustín Durán	00 (yellow card)

Bronze medal contests
(Ecuador) Lenin Preciado	10
(Colombia) Juan Hernández	00
(Argentina) Rodrigo Jara	10
(Chile) Juan Pérez	00

=== Men's 73kg ===
Main Bracket

Quarter-finals
(Venezuela) Sergio Mattey	10
(Paraguay) Saúl Landaira	00
(Colombia) Arkangel Barboza	10
(Uruguay) Agustín Gorriz	00
(Chile) Juan Pablo Vega	00
(Brazil) Jonas Ribeiro	01 (yellow card)

Semi-finals
(Peru) Alonso Wong	10
(Venezuela) Sergio Mattey	00
(Colombia) Arkangel Barboza	00
(Brazil) Jonas Ribeiro	10 (yellow card)

Final
(Peru) Alonso Wong	10
(Brazil) Jonas Ribeiro	00

Repechage

Repechage
(Uruguay) Agustín Gorriz	00
(Chile) Juan Pablo Vega	10 (yellow card)
Bye
Bye

Bronze medal contests
(Chile) Juan Pablo Vega	00
(Venezuela) Sergio Mattey	10 (yellow card)
(Paraguay) Saúl Landaira	00
(Colombia) Arkangel Barboza	10 (yellow card)

=== Men's 81kg ===
Main Bracket

Round of 16
(Panama) Alexis Harrison	00
(Brazil) Kauan Dos Santos	10 (yellow card)

Quarter-finals
(Argentina) Agustín Gil	10
(Brazil) Kauan Dos Santos	00
(Uruguay) Franklin Gamou	10
(Bolivia) Luis Roca	00 (yellow card)
(Peru) Javier Saavedra	10
(Paraguay) Diego Noguera	00
(Venezuela) Jonheluis Patete	00
(Chile) Jorge Pérez	10 (yellow card)

Semi-finals
(Argentina) Agustín Gil	10
(Uruguay) Franklin Gamou	00 (yellow card)
(Peru) Javier Saavedra	00
(Chile) Jorge Pérez	01 (yellow card)

Gold medal contest
(Argentina) Agustín Gil	01
(Chile) Jorge Pérez	00 (yellow card)

Repechage

Repechage
(Brazil) Kauan Dos Santos	11
(Bolivia) Luis Roca	00
(Paraguay) Diego Noguera	00
(Venezuela) Jonheluis Patete	10 (yellow card)

Bronze medal contests
(Brazil) Kauan Dos Santos	10
(Peru) Javier Saavedra	00
(Venezuela) Jonheluis Patete	00
(Uruguay) Franklin Gamou	01 (yellow card)

=== Men's 90 kg ===
Main Bracket

Round of 16
(Bolivia) Edgar Justiniano	00
(Uruguay) Alain Aprahamian	10

Quarter-finals
(Peru) Yuta Galarreta	10
(Brazil) Wilgner Mendes	00
(Venezuela) Carlos Páez	11
(Chile) Daniel Arancibia	00 (yellow card)
(Colombia) Daniel Paz	10
(Paraguay) Ángel Gini	00
(Argentina) Mariano Coto	10
(Uruguay) Alain Aprahamian	00 (yellow card)

Semi-finals
(Peru) Yuta Galarreta	10
(Venezuela) Carlos Páez	00
(Colombia) Daniel Paz	00
(Argentina) Mariano Coto	10 (yellow card)

Gold medal contest
(Peru) Yuta Galarreta	01
(Argentina) Mariano Coto	00 (yellow card)

Repechage

Repechage
(Brazil) Wilgner Mendes	10
(Chile) Daniel Arancibia	00 (yellow card)
(Paraguay) Ángel Gini	00
(Uruguay) Alain Aprahamian	11 (yellow card)

Bronze medal contests
(Brazil) Wilgner Mendes	01
(Colombia) Daniel Paz	00 (yellow card)
(Uruguay) Alain Aprahamian	11
(Venezuela) Carlos Páez	01 (yellow card)

=== Men's 100 kg ===
Main Bracket

Quarter-finals
(Argentina) Ivo Dargoltz	00
(Brazil) Gabriel Arevalo	01 (yellow card)
(Colombia) Alejandro Escobar	00
(Venezuela) Antonio Rodríguez	10 (yellow card)

Semi-finals
(Chile) Thomas Briceño	00
(Brazil) Gabriel Arevalo	10 (yellow card)
(Peru) Daryl Yamamoto	00
(Venezuela) Antonio Rodríguez	10 (yellow card)

Final
(Brazil) Gabriel Arevalo	01
(Venezuela) Antonio Rodríguez	00 (yellow card)

Repechage

Repechage
Bye
Bye
Bye
Bye

Bronze medal contests
(Argentina) Ivo Dargoltz	00
(Peru) Daryl Yamamoto	10 (yellow card)
(Colombia) Alejandro Escobar	00
(Chile) Thomas Briceño	10 (yellow card)

=== Men's +100 kg ===
Pos	Team	Pld	W	L	PF	PA	PD	Pts	Result	ECU	VEN	CHI	ARG	BRA
1	(Ecuador) Freddy Figueroa	4	4	0	4	0	+4	8	1st place, gold medalist(s)	—	01–00	10–00	10–00	01–00
2	(Venezuela) Luis Amezquita	4	2	2	2	2	0	6	2nd place, silver medalist(s)	00–01	—	10–01	00–10	10–00
3	(Chile) Francisco Solis	4	2	2	2	2	0	6	3rd place, bronze medalist(s)	00–10	01–10	—	10–00	10–00
4	(Argentina) Joaquín Burgos	4	2	2	2	2	0	6	3rd place, bronze medalist(s)	00–10	10–00	00–10	—	01–00
5	(Brazil) Guilherme Cabral	4	0	4	0	4	−4	4		00–01	00–10	00–10	00–01	—

=== Women's 48 kg ===
Main Bracket

Quarter-finals
(Chile) Mary Dee Vargas	10
(Venezuela) María Giménez	00 (yellow card)
(Peru) Thalia Gamarra	00
(Paraguay) Gabriela Narváez	01 (yellow card)
(Argentina) Ingrid Perafan	10
(Panama) Némesis Candelo	00
(Brazil) Alexia Nascimento	10
(Colombia) Erika Lasso	00

Semi-finals
(Chile) Mary Dee Vargas	10
(Paraguay) Gabriela Narváez	00
(Argentina) Ingrid Perafan	00
(Colombia) Erika Lasso	10 (yellow card)

Final
(Chile) Mary Dee Vargas	10
(Colombia) Erika Lasso	00

Repechage

Repechage
(Venezuela) María Giménez	10
(Peru) Thalia Gamarra	00
(Panama) Némesis Candelo	10
(Brazil) Alexia Nascimento	00 (yellow card)

Bronze medal contests
(Venezuela) María Giménez	10
(Argentina) Ingrid Perafan	00
(Panama) Némesis Candelo	00
(Paraguay) Gabriela Narváez	10 (yellow card)

=== Women's 52 kg ===
Main Bracket

Quarter-finals
(Bolivia) Juana Sacaca	00
(Brazil) Thayná Lemos	10 (yellow card)
(Chile) Judith González	10
(Paraguay) Ashliegh Talavera	00 (yellow card)

Semi-finals
(Venezuela) Fabiola Díaz	00
(Brazil) Thayná Lemos	10 (yellow card)
(Argentina) Agustina Lahiton	00
(Chile) Judith González	01 (yellow card)

Final
(Brazil) Thayná Lemos	10
(Chile) Judith González	00 (yellow card)

Repechage

Repechage
Bye
Bye
Bye
Bye

Bronze medal contests
(Bolivia) Juana Sacaca	00
(Argentina) Agustina Lahiton	10 (yellow card)
(Paraguay) Ashliegh Talavera	00
(Venezuela) Fabiola Díaz	10 (yellow card)

=== Women's 57 kg ===
Main Bracket

Quarter-finals
(Argentina) Brisa Gómez	10
(Uruguay) Renata Almeida	00
(Peru) Marian Flores	10
(Paraguay) Fiorella Aranda	00 (yellow card)
(Panama) Kristine Jimenez	00
(Brazil) Gabrielle Gonzaga	10 (yellow card)
(Ecuador) Astrid Gavidia	01
(Venezuela) Kady Cabezo	00 (yellow card)

Semi-finals
(Argentina) Brisa Gómez	00
(Peru) Marian Flores	01 (yellow card)
(Brazil) Gabrielle Gonzaga	10
(Ecuador) Astrid Gavidia	00

Final
(Peru) Marian Flores	00
(Brazil) Gabrielle Gonzaga	10 (yellow card)

Repechage

Repechage
(Uruguay) Renata Almeida	00
(Paraguay) Fiorella Aranda	01 (yellow card)
(Panama) Kristine Jimenez	00
(Venezuela) Kady Cabezo	10 (yellow card)

Bronze medal contests
(Paraguay) Fiorella Aranda	00
(Ecuador) Astrid Gavidia	10 (yellow card)
(Venezuela) Kady Cabezo	00
(Argentina) Brisa Gómez	10 (yellow card)

=== Women's 63 kg ===
Main Bracket

Quarter-finals
(Argentina) Agustina de Lucía	10
(Uruguay) Martina Howard	00 (yellow card)
(Brazil) Gabriela Moraes	10
(Chile) Constanza Pérez	00

Semi-finals
(Venezuela) Anriquelis Barrios	10
(Argentina) Agustina de Lucía	00 (yellow card)
(Colombia) Cindy Mera	10
(Brazil) Gabriella Moraes	00 (yellow card)

Final
(Venezuela) Anriquelis Barrios	10
(Colombia) Cindy Mera	00

Repechage

Repechage
Bye
Bye
Bye
Bye

Bronze medal contests
(Uruguay) Martina Howard	00
(Brazil) Gabriella Moraes	10 (yellow card)
(Chile) Constanza Pérez	00
(Argentina) Agustina de Lucía	10 (yellow card)

=== Women's 70 kg ===
Main Bracket

Quarter-finals
(Peru) Xsara Morales	10
(Bolivia) Alejandra Baldiviezo	00
(Brazil) Millena Da Silva	10
(Argentina) Lucía Cantero	00

Semi-finals
(Ecuador) Celinda Corozo	10
(Peru) Xsara Morales	00 (yellow card)
(Colombia) Luisa Bonilla	00
(Brazil) Millena Da Silva	10 (yellow card)

Final
(Ecuador) Celinda Corozo	10
(Brazil) Millena Da Silva	00

Repechage

Repechage
Bye
Bye
Bye
Bye

Bronze medal contests
(Bolivia) Alejandra Baldiviezo	00
(Colombia) Luisa Bonilla	10 (yellow card)
(Argentina) Lucía Cantero	10
(Peru) Xsara Morales	00

=== Women's 78 kg ===
Main Bracket

Quarter-finals
(Colombia) Brenda Olaya	00
(Venezuela) Elvismar Rodríguez	10 (yellow card)
(Brazil) Beatriz Freitas	10
(Bolivia) Nayda Ingala	00
(Peru) Camila Figueroa	10
(Argentina) Anahi Galeano	00

Semi-finals
(Ecuador) Vanessa Chala	00
(Venezuela) Elvismar Rodríguez	10 (yellow card)
(Brazil) Beatriz Freitas	10
(Peru) Camila Figueroa	00

Final
(Venezuela) Elvismar Rodríguez	10
(Brazil) Beatriz Freitas	00

Repechage

Repechage
Bye
Bye
(Bolivia) Nayda Ingala	00
(Argentina) Anahi Galeano	10 (yellow card)

Bronze medal contests
(Colombia) Brenda Olaya	10
(Peru) Camila Figueroa	00
(Argentina) Anahi Galeano	00
(Ecuador) Vanessa Chala	10 (yellow card)

=== Women's +78 kg ===
Pos	Team	Pld	W	L	PF	PA	PD	Pts	Result	BRA	VEN	COL	ARG	CHI
1	(Brazil) Giovanna Dos Santos	4	4	0	4	0	+4	8	1st place, gold medalist(s)	—	10–00	10–00	10–00	10–00
2	(Venezuela) Amarantha Urdaneta	4	3	1	3	1	+2	7	2nd place, silver medalist(s)	00–10	—	10–00	10–00	10–00
3	(Colombia) Brigitte Carabalí	4	2	2	2	2	0	6	3rd place, bronze medalist(s)	00–10	00–10	—	10–00	10–00
4	(Argentina) Amanda Bredeston	4	1	3	1	3	−2	5	3rd place, bronze medalist(s)	00–10	00–10	00–10	—	10–00
5	(Chile) Giordanna Gutiérrez	4	0	4	0	4	−4	4		00–10	00–10	00–10	00–10	—

=== Mixed team ===
Main Bracket

Quarter-finals
Argentina	3
Venezuela	4
Chile	3
Colombia	4

Semi-finals
Brazil	4
Venezuela	1
Peru	4
Colombia	1

Final
Brazil	4
Peru	3

Repechage

Repechage
Bye
Bye
Bye
Bye

Bronze medal contests
Chile	1
Venezuela	4
Argentina	4
Colombia	2
