= Robert Florentino =

Dominican judoka (born 1997)

Personal information
- Full name: Robert Alfonso Florentino Tapia
- Born: 14 June 1997 (age 29)
- Occupation: Judoka

Sport
- Country: Dominican Republic
- Sport: Judo
- Weight class: ‍–‍90 kg

Achievements and titles
- Olympic Games: R32 (2020, 2024)
- World Champ.: R16 (2023)
- Pan American Champ.: (2021, 2024, 2026)
Medal record
Men's judo
Representing Dominican Republic
Pan American Games
Bronze medal – third place	2023 Santiago	‍–‍90 kg
Bronze medal – third place	2023 Santiago	Mixed team
Pan American Championships
Gold medal – first place	2021 Guadalajara	‍–‍90 kg
Gold medal – first place	2024 Rio de Janeiro	‍–‍90 kg
Gold medal – first place	2026 Panama City	‍–‍90 kg
Silver medal – second place	2025 Santiago	‍–‍100 kg
Bronze medal – third place	2016 Havana	‍–‍90 kg
Bronze medal – third place	2018 San José	‍–‍90 kg
Bronze medal – third place	2019 Lima	‍–‍90 kg
Bronze medal – third place	2020 Guadalajara	‍–‍100 kg
Bronze medal – third place	2022 Lima	‍–‍90 kg
IJF Grand Slam
Bronze medal – third place	2026 Tbilisi	‍–‍100 kg
IJF Grand Prix
Bronze medal – third place	2019 Marrakesh	‍–‍90 kg
World Juniors Championships
Silver medal – second place	2017 Zagreb	‍–‍90 kg
Pan American Junior Championships
Gold medal – first place	2016 Cordoba	‍–‍90 kg
Gold medal – first place	2017 Cancún	‍–‍90 kg

Profile at external databases
- IJF: 13598
- JudoInside.com: 22806
- Updated on 23 April 2026

Robert Florentino (born 14 June 1997) is a male judoka from the Dominican Republic.

Florentino is the 2021 Pan American Judo Championships gold medalist in the ‍–‍90 kg category and represented the Dominican Republic at the 2020 Summer Olympics.
