= Guilherme Schimidt =

Brazilian judoka (born 2000)

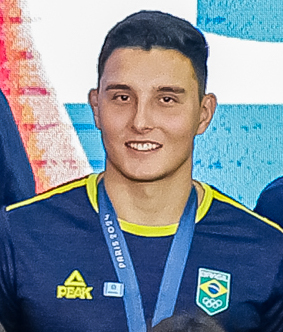
- Schimidt in 2024

Personal information
- Born: 6 November 2000 (age 26) Brasília, Federal District, Brazil
- Occupation: Judoka
- Height: 182 cm (6 ft 0 in)

Sport
- Country: Brazil
- Sport: Judo
- Weight class: ‍–‍81 kg, ‍–‍90 kg

Achievements and titles
- Olympic Games: R16 (2024)
- World Champ.: R16 (2022, 2024)
- Pan American Champ.: (gold) (2021, 2022, 2024)
Medal record
Men's judo
Representing Brazil
Olympic Games
Bronze medal – third place	2024 Paris	Mixed team
Pan American Games
Gold medal – first place	2023 Santiago	‍–‍81 kg
Silver medal – second place	2023 Santiago	Mixed team
Pan American Championships
Gold medal – first place	2021 Guadalajara	‍–‍81 kg
Gold medal – first place	2022 Lima	‍–‍81 kg
Gold medal – first place	2022 Lima	Mixed team
Gold medal – first place	2023 Calgary	Mixed team
Gold medal – first place	2024 Rio de Janeiro	‍–‍81 kg
Silver medal – second place	2023 Calgary	‍–‍81 kg
World Masters
Silver medal – second place	2023 Budapest	‍–‍81 kg
IJF Grand Slam
Gold medal – first place	2022 Antalya	‍–‍81 kg
Gold medal – first place	2022 Budapest	‍–‍81 kg
Gold medal – first place	2026 Budapest	‍–‍90 kg
Silver medal – second place	2023 Astana	‍–‍81 kg
Silver medal – second place	2026 Astana	‍–‍90 kg
Bronze medal – third place	2024 Antalya	‍–‍81 kg
Bronze medal – third place	2026 Tbilisi	‍–‍90 kg
IJF Grand Prix
Gold medal – first place	2026 Zagreb	‍–‍90 kg
Silver medal – second place	2021 Zagreb	‍–‍81 kg
Silver medal – second place	2026 Qingdao	‍–‍90 kg
Bronze medal – third place	2025 Guadalajara	‍–‍90 kg
Bronze medal – third place	2026 Lima	‍–‍90 kg
World Juniors Championships
Bronze medal – third place	2019 Marrakesh	‍–‍81 kg
Pan American Junior Championships
Silver medal – second place	2019 Cali	‍–‍81 kg
Pan American Cadet Championships
Bronze medal – third place	2017 Cancún	‍–‍73 kg

Profile at external databases
- IJF: 36972
- JudoInside.com: 114643
- Updated on 15 November 2026

Guilherme César Schimidt (born 6 November 2000 in Brasília) is a Brazilian judoka. He currently ranks 4th in the International Judo Federation world ranking in the under-81kg category.

== Career ==
Schimidt was born and raised in Brasília. He suffered from financial problems during his journey to becoming a professional. Sometimes he even campaigned on social media to raise money and be able to compete in certain competitions. He managed to overcome the adversities at the beginning of his career to become one of the main Brazilian judokas.

In 2019, Schimidt was a bronze medalist at the World Junior Championships, held in Morocco.

At the 2021 Pan American Judo Championships held in Guadalajara, Mexico, he won his first title in the Half-middleweight (81 kg) category.

On 25 September 2021, Schimidt won his first medal on the IJF World Tour by placing second in the Zagreb Grand Prix (Croatia), in the ‍–‍81 kg category. He won three matches and lost the final to the Georgian Tato Grigalashvili.

On 1 April 2022, Schimidt won the gold medal in the ‍–‍81 kg category of the Antalya Grand Slam (Grand Slam is the tournament that gives the most points in the judo rankings after the Olympics, the World Championships and the World Masters). In the final, he defeated Vedat Albayrak, from Turkey.

At the 2022 Pan American-Oceania Judo Championships held in Lima, Peru, became two-time champion of the Half-middleweight (81 kg) category and won the gold in mixed teams.

On 8 July 2022, Schimidt won the gold medal in the ‍–‍81 kg category of the Budapest Grand Slam by defeating 2018 world champion Saeid Mollaei, from Azerbaijan.

Schimidt participated in the 2021, 2022 and 2023 World Judo Championships.

At the 2023 Judo Grand Slam Astana, Schimidt won a silver medal.

At 2023 Judo World Masters (second most important competition on the world judo circuit, after the World Championship), Schimidt obtained a silver medal. To reach the decision, he defeated the Olympic champion, Japanese Takanori Nagase and the ranking leader and current two-time world champion Tato Grigalashvili.

At the 2023 Pan American-Oceania Judo Championships held in Calgary, Canada, Schimidt won two medals: he was runner-up in the Half-middleweight (−81 kg) division and won the gold in mixed teams.

At the 2023 Pan American Games he obtained his greatest title when he won the gold medal in the Half-middleweight (−81 kg) division, in addition to also obtaining silver in the Brazilian mixed team.

At the 2024 Judo Grand Slam Antalya, he won a bronze medal.

At the 2024 Pan American-Oceania Judo Championships, he won the gold medal, becoming three-time champion of the competition.

At the 2024 World Judo Championships, Schimidt, currently fourth in the world rankings in his category, won his first fight, but in the round of 16, he ended up being beaten by the Austrian Bernd Fasching by ippon.

During the 2024 Summer Olympics, Schimidt won only one fight before elimination, but proceeded to win a bronze medal in the mixed team competition.
