= Rafael Macedo (judoka) =

Brazilian judoka (born 1994)

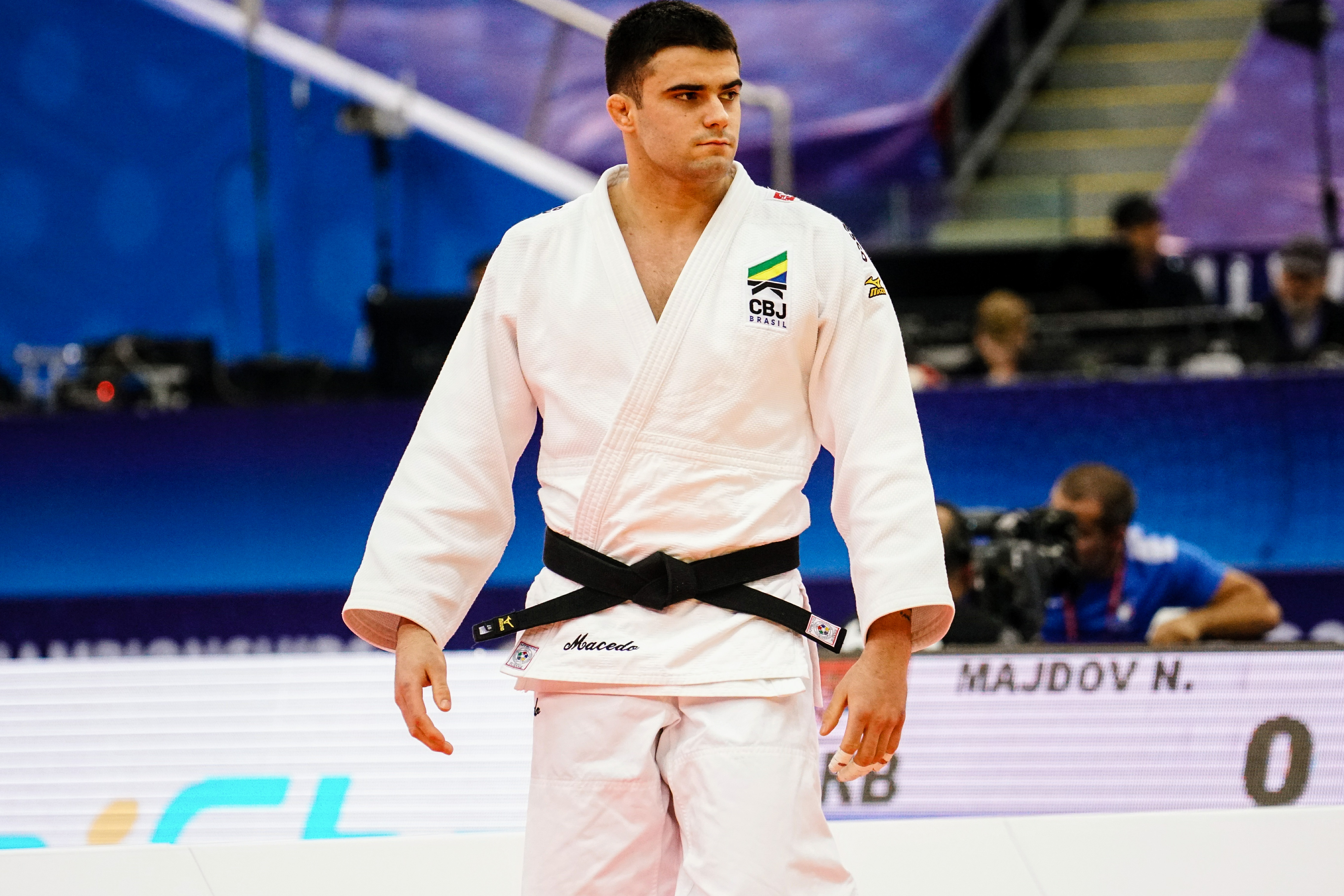
- Macedo in 2018

Personal information
- Born: 15 September 1994 (age 31) São José dos Campos, Brazil
- Occupation: Judoka
- Height: 180 cm (5 ft 11 in)

Sport
- Country: Brazil
- Sport: Judo
- Weight class: ‍–‍90 kg

Achievements and titles
- Olympic Games: 5th (2024)
- World Champ.: R16 (2021, 2022, 2023, 2024)
- Pan American Champ.: (gold) (2023, 2025)
Medal record
Men's judo
Representing Brazil
Olympic Games
| Bronze medal – third place | 2024 Paris | Mixed team |
World Championships
| Bronze medal – third place | 2019 Tokyo | Mixed team |
| Bronze medal – third place | 2021 Budapest | Mixed team |
Pan American Games
| Silver medal – second place | 2023 Santiago | ‍–‍90 kg |
| Silver medal – second place | 2023 Santiago | Mixed team |
Pan American Championships
| Gold medal – first place | 2019 Lima | Mixed team |
| Gold medal – first place | 2020 Guadalajara | Mixed team |
| Gold medal – first place | 2023 Calgary | ‍–‍90 kg |
| Gold medal – first place | 2023 Calgary | Mixed team |
| Gold medal – first place | 2025 Santiago | ‍–‍90 kg |
| Silver medal – second place | 2019 Lima | ‍–‍90 kg |
| Silver medal – second place | 2020 Guadalajara | ‍–‍90 kg |
| Silver medal – second place | 2021 Guadalajara | ‍–‍90 kg |
| Bronze medal – third place | 2017 Panama City | ‍–‍90 kg |
| Bronze medal – third place | 2024 Rio de Janeiro | ‍–‍90 kg |
| Bronze medal – third place | 2026 Panama City | ‍–‍90 kg |
World Masters
| Bronze medal – third place | 2022 Jerusalem | ‍–‍90 kg |
IJF Grand Slam
| Bronze medal – third place | 2019 Ekaterinburg | ‍–‍90 kg |
| Bronze medal – third place | 2022 Antalya | ‍–‍90 kg |
| Bronze medal – third place | 2025 Tbilisi | ‍–‍90 kg |
IJF Grand Prix
| Gold medal – first place | 2018 Tbilisi | ‍–‍90 kg |
| Gold medal – first place | 2025 Lima | ‍–‍90 kg |
| Gold medal – first place | 2026 Lima | ‍–‍90 kg |
| Silver medal – second place | 2017 Zagreb | ‍–‍90 kg |
| Silver medal – second place | 2019 Perth | ‍–‍90 kg |
| Silver medal – second place | 2022 Zagreb | ‍–‍90 kg |
| Bronze medal – third place | 2018 Cancún | ‍–‍90 kg |
| Bronze medal – third place | 2019 Montreal | ‍–‍90 kg |
| Bronze medal – third place | 2020 Tel Aviv | ‍–‍90 kg |
| Bronze medal – third place | 2023 Zagreb | ‍–‍90 kg |
World Juniors Championships
| Gold medal – first place | 2014 Fort Lauderdale | ‍–‍81 kg |
Pan American Junior Championships
| Gold medal – first place | 2014 San Salvador | ‍–‍81 kg |

Profile at external databases
- IJF: 17101
- JudoInside.com: 76969
- Updated on 17 August 2026

Rafael Godoy de Macedo (born 15 September 1994 in São José dos Campos) is a Brazilian judoka.

== Career ==
He moved to Porto Alegre in 2013 and started training at Sogipa, alongside some of the best judokas in the country.

In 2014, he won the gold medal at the World Judo Juniors Championships.

At the 2017 Pan American Judo Championships Macedo won a bronze medal in Middleweight (90 kg) category.

At the 2019 Judo Grand Slam Ekaterinburg (Grand Slam is the tournament that gives the most points in the judo rankings after the Olympics, the World Championships and the World Masters), Macedo obtained the bronze medal.

At the 2019 Pan American Judo Championships, Macedo won a silver medal in the Middleweight (90 kg) category, and a gold medal at the Mixed team.

At the 2019 World Judo Championships, Macedo won the first fight but was eliminated in the 2nd round. Representing Brazil in the mixed team, he obtained a bronze medal.

At the 2020 Pan American Judo Championships, Macedo won a silver medal in the Middleweight (90 kg) category, and a gold medal at the Mixed team.

Macedo represented Brazil at the 2020 Summer Olympics.

At the 2021 Pan American Judo Championships, Macedo won a silver medal in the Middleweight (90 kg) category.

Ranking 18th in the world, he participated in the 2021 World Judo Championships, where he won two fights and was eliminated in the round of 16 by Mongolian Gantulgyn Altanbagana. In the mixed team competition, Macedo won a bronze representing Brazil.

At the 2022 Judo Grand Slam Antalya, Macedo obtained the bronze medal.

At the 2022 World Judo Championships held in Tashkent, Macedo debuted with victory, but was eliminated by Olympic champion Lasha Bekauri in the round of 16.

At the 2022 Judo World Masters (second most important competition on the judo circuit, after the World Championship), Macedo won the bronze medal.

Ranking 11th in the world rankings in the 90 kg judo category, Macedo competed in the 2023 World Judo Championships in Doha, Qatar. He won two fights, one of them against Krisztián Tóth, a Hungarian bronze medalist at the Olympics, but was eliminated in the round of 16 by Russian Mansur Lorsanov.

At the 2023 Pan American-Oceania Judo Championships held in Calgary, Canada, he won three fights by ippon and won, for the first time, the gold medal in the continental competition after obtaining silver in three previous finals.

At the 2023 Pan American Games, Macedo reached the final against Cuban Ivan Felipe Silva Morales and even forced two punishments on his opponent. Macedo was better in the fight, but, in an attempt to enter, he placed his head on the ground in a movement interpreted by the referee as irregular (hansoku-make, which is using the head as a defense of an entrance) and was disqualified, obtaining the silver medal. He also obtained silver in the Brazilian mixed team.

At the 2024 Pan American-Oceania Judo Championships, he won a bronze medal.

At the 2024 World Judo Championships, Macedo reached the round of 16 of the competition for the fourth time in a row, where he was eliminated by the Japanese Goki Tajima, who ended up being the tournament champion.

At the 2024 Olympic Games in Paris, Macedo reached the fight to compete for the bronze medal. In the bout, he suffered three shido (penalties). The referee's decision to give a third shido, which disqualified him as per judo rules, has been subject to criticism in his home country. Macedo finished in 5th place in the men's 90 kg event. A few days later, the Brazilian team won one of the two bronze medals in the mixed team event, thus earning Macedo his first olympic medal.

In March 2025, he won the bronze medal at the 2025 Judo Grand Slam Tbilisi.

At the 2025 Pan American-Oceania Judo Championships, he won the gold medal, winning his second title in this tournament.
