= Magdiel Estrada =

Cuban Olympic judoka (born 1994)

Personal information
- Born: 26 August 1994 (age 31) Matanzas, Cuba
- Occupation: Judoka

Sport
- Country: Cuba
- Sport: Judo
- Weight class: ‍–‍73 kg

Achievements and titles
- Olympic Games: R32 (2016, 2020)
- World Champ.: R16 (2017, 2022)
- Pan American Champ.: (2019, 2021)
Medal record
Men's judo
Representing Cuba
Pan American Games
Gold medal – first place	2015 Toronto	‍–‍73 kg
Gold medal – first place	2019 Lima	‍–‍73 kg
Gold medal – first place	2023 Santiago	Mixed team
Pan American Championships
Gold medal – first place	2019 Lima	‍–‍73 kg
Gold medal – first place	2021 Guadalajara	‍–‍73 kg
Silver medal – second place	2013 San José	‍–‍73 kg
Silver medal – second place	2014 Guayaquil	‍–‍73 kg
Silver medal – second place	2015 Edmonton	‍–‍73 kg
Silver medal – second place	2018 San José	‍–‍73 kg
Bronze medal – third place	2016 Havana	‍–‍73 kg
Bronze medal – third place	2017 Panama City	‍–‍73 kg
Bronze medal – third place	2022 Lima	‍–‍73 kg
Bronze medal – third place	2023 Calgary	‍–‍73 kg
IJF Grand Slam
Bronze medal – third place	2023 Tashkent	‍–‍73 kg
IJF Grand Prix
Silver medal – second place	2014 Havana	‍–‍73 kg
Silver medal – second place	2019 Tbilisi	‍–‍73 kg
Silver medal – second place	2022 Zagreb	‍–‍73 kg
Bronze medal – third place	2019 Tashkent	‍–‍73 kg

Profile at external databases
- IJF: 11850
- JudoInside.com: 87163
- Updated on 18 September 2023

Magdiel Estrada (born 26 August 1994) is a Cuban judoka. He competed at the 2016 Summer Olympics in the men's 73 kg event, in which he was eliminated in the second round by Lasha Shavdatuashvili.

Estrada represented Cuba at the 2020 Summer Olympics.
