= Maylín del Toro =

Cuban judoka (born 1994)

Personal information
- Born: 22 October 1994 (age 31) Santiago de Cuba, Cuba
- Occupation: Judoka

Sport
- Country: Cuba
- Sport: Judo
- Weight class: ‍–‍63 kg

Achievements and titles
- Olympic Games: R16 (2020)
- World Champ.: 5th (2018)
- Pan American Champ.: (2015, 2018)
Medal record
Women's judo
Representing Cuba
Pan American Games
Gold medal – first place	2019 Lima	‍–‍63 kg
Gold medal – first place	2023 Santiago	‍–‍63 kg
Gold medal – first place	2023 Santiago	Mixed team
Bronze medal – third place	2015 Toronto	‍–‍63 kg
Pan American Championships
Gold medal – first place	2015 Edmonton	‍–‍63 kg
Gold medal – first place	2018 San José	‍–‍63 kg
Silver medal – second place	2019 Lima	‍–‍63 kg
Bronze medal – third place	2023 Calgary	‍–‍63 kg
Bronze medal – third place	2024 Rio de Janeiro	‍–‍63 kg
Bronze medal – third place	2025 Santiago	‍–‍63 kg
IJF Grand Slam
Silver medal – second place	2019 Abu Dhabi	‍–‍63 kg
Silver medal – second place	2023 Tel Aviv	‍–‍63 kg
Bronze medal – third place	2019 Brasilia	‍–‍63 kg
Bronze medal – third place	2020 Düsseldorf	‍–‍63 kg
Bronze medal – third place	2022 Budapest	‍–‍63 kg
Bronze medal – third place	2023 Paris	‍–‍63 kg
Bronze medal – third place	2025 Tbilisi	‍–‍63 kg
IJF Grand Prix
Gold medal – first place	2019 Antalya	‍–‍63 kg
Bronze medal – third place	2019 Tbilisi	‍–‍63 kg
Bronze medal – third place	2019 Budapest	‍–‍63 kg
Central American and Caribbean Games
Gold medal – first place	2023 San Salvador	Mixed team
Silver medal – second place	2023 San Salvador	‍–‍63 kg
Bronze medal – third place	2026 Santo Domingo	‍–‍63 kg
World Juniors Championships
Bronze medal – third place	2013 Ljubljana	‍–‍63 kg

Profile at external databases
- IJF: 14589
- JudoInside.com: 58450
- Updated on 27 July 2026

Maylín del Toro Carvajal (born 22 October 1994) is a Cuban judoka.

Del Toro is twice gold medalist of the Pan American Judo Championships in the ‍–‍63 kg category. She represented Cuba at the 2020 Summer Olympics.
