= Iván Felipe Silva Morales =

Cuban judoka (born 1996)

Iván Silva
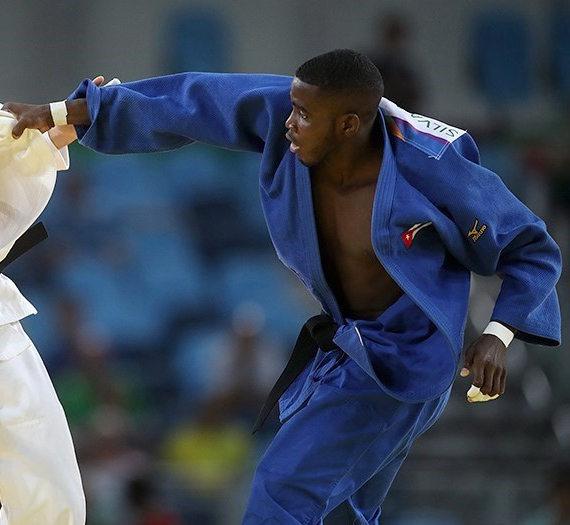
- Silva Morales at the 2016 Olympics

Personal information
- Full name: Iván Felipe Silva Morales
- Born: 8 February 1996 (age 30) Matanzas, Cuba
- Occupation: Judoka
- Height: 180 cm (5 ft 11 in)

Sport
- Country: Cuba
- Sport: Judo
- Weight class: ‍–‍90 kg
- Coached by: Justo Noda (national)

Achievements and titles
- Olympic Games: R32 (2020, 2024)
- World Champ.: (silver) (2018)
- Pan American Champ.: (2017, 2018, 2019, 2020, 2022)
Medal record
Men's judo
Representing Cuba
World Championships
Silver medal – second place	2018 Baku	‍–‍90 kg
Pan American Games
Gold medal – first place	2019 Lima	‍–‍90 kg
Gold medal – first place	2023 Santiago	‍–‍90 kg
Gold medal – first place	2023 Santiago	Mixed team
Silver medal – second place	2015 Toronto	‍–‍81 kg
Pan American Championships
Gold medal – first place	2017 Panama City	‍–‍90 kg
Gold medal – first place	2018 San José	‍–‍90 kg
Gold medal – first place	2019 Lima	‍–‍90 kg
Gold medal – first place	2020 Guadalajara	‍–‍90 kg
Gold medal – first place	2022 Lima	‍–‍90 kg
Silver medal – second place	2026 Panama City	‍–‍100 kg
Bronze medal – third place	2014 Guayaquil	‍–‍81 kg
Bronze medal – third place	2016 Havana	‍–‍81 kg
Bronze medal – third place	2024 Rio de Janeiro	‍–‍90 kg
IJF Grand Slam
Gold medal – first place	2022 Antalya	‍–‍90 kg
Silver medal – second place	2019 Brasilia	‍–‍90 kg
Bronze medal – third place	2016 Baku	‍–‍81 kg
Bronze medal – third place	2020 Paris	‍–‍90 kg
Bronze medal – third place	2022 Tel Aviv	‍–‍90 kg
Bronze medal – third place	2022 Budapest	‍–‍90 kg
Bronze medal – third place	2023 Paris	‍–‍90 kg
Bronze medal – third place	2023 Tbilisi	‍–‍90 kg
Bronze medal – third place	2024 Antalya	‍–‍90 kg
Bronze medal – third place	2025 Paris	‍–‍100 kg
Bronze medal – third place	2025 Tashkent	‍–‍100 kg
IJF Grand Prix
Gold medal – first place	2016 Almaty	‍–‍81 kg
Gold medal – first place	2018 Cancún	‍–‍90 kg
Gold medal – first place	2019 Tbilisi	‍–‍90 kg
Gold medal – first place	2024 Linz	‍–‍90 kg
Gold medal – first place	2025 Linz	‍–‍100 kg
Bronze medal – third place	2017 Cancún	‍–‍90 kg
Bronze medal – third place	2018 Budapest	‍–‍90 kg
Bronze medal – third place	2019 Hohhot	‍–‍90 kg
Bronze medal – third place	2019 Budapest	‍–‍90 kg
World Juniors Championships
Bronze medal – third place	2015 Abu Dhabi	‍–‍81 kg
Youth Olympic Games
Bronze medal – third place	2014 Nanjing	‍–‍81 kg

Profile at external databases
- IJF: 13809
- JudoInside.com: 87190
- Updated on 23 April 2026

Iván Felipe Silva Morales (born 8 February 1996) is a Cuban judoka who competes in the 81 and 90 kg division. He won a silver medal at the 2015 Pan American Games and bronze medals at the 2014 and 2016 Pan American championships. He was eliminated in the second round at the 2016 Olympics.

He represented Cuba at the 2020 Summer Olympics.

He won one of the bronze medals in his event at the 2022 Judo Grand Slam Tel Aviv held in Tel Aviv, Israel.
