= Judo at the 2023 Pan American Games – Men's 60 kg =

Judo Men's 60 kg at the 2023 Pan American Games
- Venue: Contact Sports Center
- Location: Santiago, Chile
- Date: 28 October
- Competitors: 11 from 10 nations
- Website: Official website

Medalists
gold medal	Michel Augusto (1st title)	Brazil
silver medal	Johan Rojas	Colombia
bronze medal	Arath Juárez	Mexico
bronze medal	Juan Ayala	Ecuador

Competition at external databases
- Links: IJF

The men's 60 kg competition of the judo events at the 2023 Pan American Games was held on 28 October at the Contact Sports Center (Centro de Entrenamiento de los Deportes de Contacto) in Santiago, Chile. A total of 11 athletes from 10 NOC's competed.

== Schedule ==
All times are local (UTC−3)

Date	Time	Event
Saturday, 28 October 2023	10:00	Elimination round of 16
Saturday, 28 October 2023	10:00	Quarterfinals
Saturday, 28 October 2023	11:00	Repechage
Saturday, 28 October 2023	11:00	Semifinals
Saturday, 28 October 2023	15:00	Finals

== Results ==
=== Main Bracket ===
Round of 16
Iván Salas (VEN)	00
Johan Rojas (COL)	01
José Ramos (EAI)	00
Jairo Moreno (ESA)	10 (yellow card)
Juan Ayala (ECU)	10
David Terao (USA)	00

Quarter-finals
Bryan Garboa (ECU)	00
Lucas Fernández (CHI)	10 (yellow card)
Arath Juárez (MEX)	00
Johan Rojas (COL)	10
Michel Augusto (BRA)	01
Jairo Moreno (ESA)	00
Sebastián Sancho (CRC)	01
Juan Ayala (ECU)	00 (yellow card)

Semi-finals
Lucas Fernández (CHI)	00
Johan Rojas (COL)	10
Michel Augusto (BRA)	01 (yellow card)
Sebastián Sancho (CRC)	00

Gold medal contest
Johan Rojas (COL)	00
Michel Augusto (BRA)	10

=== Repechage ===
Repechage
Bryan Garboa (ECU)	00
Arath Juárez (MEX)	10
Jairo Moreno (ESA)	00
Juan Ayala (ECU)	10

Bronze medal contests
Arath Juárez (MEX)	11
Sebastián Sancho (CRC)	00
Juan Ayala (ECU)	10
Lucas Fernández (CHI)	00
