= Andy Granda =

Cuban judoka (born 1992)

Personal information
- Born: 4 February 1992 (age 34) Matanzas, Cuba
- Occupation: Judoka

Sport
- Country: Cuba
- Sport: Judo
- Weight class: +100 kg

Achievements and titles
- Olympic Games: 5th (2024)
- World Champ.: (2022)
- Pan American Champ.: (2020, 2022, 2023, 2024, 2025)
Medal record
Men's judo
Representing Cuba
World Championships
Gold medal – first place	2022 Tashkent	+100 kg
Pan American Games
Gold medal – first place	2019 Lima	+100 kg
Gold medal – first place	2023 Santiago	+100 kg
Gold medal – first place	2023 Santiago	Mixed team
Pan American Championships
Gold medal – first place	2020 Guadalajara	+100 kg
Gold medal – first place	2022 Lima	+100 kg
Gold medal – first place	2023 Calgary	+100 kg
Gold medal – first place	2024 Rio de Janeiro	+100 kg
Gold medal – first place	2025 Santiago	+100 kg
Silver medal – second place	2014 Guayaquil	‍–‍90 kg
Silver medal – second place	2017 Panama City	‍–‍100 kg
Bronze medal – third place	2018 San José	+100 kg
Bronze medal – third place	2019 Lima	+100 kg
Bronze medal – third place	2026 Panama City	+100 kg
IJF Grand Slam
Bronze medal – third place	2020 Paris	+100 kg
Bronze medal – third place	2021 Tbilisi	+100 kg
Bronze medal – third place	2022 Antalya	+100 kg
Bronze medal – third place	2023 Tashkent	+100 kg
Bronze medal – third place	2023 Tbilisi	+100 kg
Bronze medal – third place	2024 Tbilisi	+100 kg
Bronze medal – third place	2025 Tashkent	+100 kg
IJF Grand Prix
Silver medal – second place	2018 Cancún	+100 kg
Silver medal – second place	2024 Linz	+100 kg
Bronze medal – third place	2017 Cancún	‍–‍100 kg
Bronze medal – third place	2018 Antalya	+100 kg
Central American and Caribbean Games
Gold medal – first place	2014 Veracruz	Men's team
Gold medal – first place	2018 Barranquilla	+100 kg
Gold medal – first place	2018 Barranquilla	Men's team

Profile at external databases
- IJF: 16119
- JudoInside.com: 78634
- Updated on 23 April 2026

Andy Granda (born 4 February 1992) is a Cuban judoka. He won the gold medal in the men's +100 kg event at the 2022 World Judo Championships held in Tashkent, Uzbekistan. He is a two-time gold medalist in the men's +100 kg event at the Pan American Games.

== Career ==
In 2014, Granda won the gold medal in the men's team event at the Central American and Caribbean Games held in Veracruz, Mexico. Four years later, in 2018, he won the gold medal in both the men's +100 kg event and the men's team event at the 2018 Central American and Caribbean Games held in Barranquilla, Colombia.

He won the gold medal in the men's +100 kg event at the 2019 Pan American Games held in Lima, Peru.

In 2020, Granda won one of the bronze medals in the men's +100 kg event at the Judo Grand Slam Paris held in Paris, France. In the same year, he won the gold medal in the men's +100 kg event at the 2020 Pan American Judo Championships held in Guadalajara, Mexico.

In 2021, Granda competed in the men's +100 kg event at the Judo World Masters held in Doha, Qatar. He also competed in the men's +100 kg event at the 2021 World Judo Championships in Budapest, Hungary.

Granda represented Cuba at the 2020 Summer Olympics in Tokyo, Japan. He competed in the men's +100 kg event where he was eliminated in his first match.

Granda won one of the bronze medals in his event at the 2022 Judo Grand Slam Antalya held in Antalya, Turkey and the gold in the 2022 World Judo Championships, having won the final against Saito Tatsuro from Japan.
