= Estefanía Soriano =

Dominican judoka (born 1996)

Personal information
- Nationality: Dominican
- Born: 1 October 1996 (age 29)
- Occupation: Judoka

Sport
- Country: Dominican Republic
- Sport: Judo
- Weight class: ‍–‍48 kg

Achievements and titles
- World Champ.: R64 (2019, 2022)
- Pan American Champ.: (2014)
Medal record
Women's judo
Representing Dominican Republic
Pan American Games
| Gold medal – first place | 2019 Lima | ‍–‍48 kg |
| Bronze medal – third place | 2023 Santiago | Mixed team |
Pan American Championships
| Silver medal – second place | 2014 Guayaquil | ‍–‍44 kg |
| Bronze medal – third place | 2013 San José | ‍–‍44 kg |
| Bronze medal – third place | 2022 Lima | ‍–‍48 kg |
Central American and Caribbean Games
| Silver medal – second place | 2026 Santo Domingo | ‍–‍48 kg |
Pan American Cadet Championships
| Bronze medal – third place | 2013 Buenos Aires | ‍–‍44 kg |

Profile at external databases
- IJF: 12258
- JudoInside.com: 56693
- Updated on 25 July 2026

Estefanía Soriano (born 1 October 1996) is a judoka from the Dominican Republic. She won the gold medal at the 2019 Pan American Games in Lima, Peru, at the ‍–‍48 kg division.

Soriano has also participated at the 2013 Youth World Championships, the 2014 Youth Olympic Games and the 2019 Senior World Championships.
