= Judo at the 2023 Pan American Games – Men's +100 kg =

Judo Men's +100 kg at the 2023 Pan American Games
- Venue: Contact Sports Center
- Location: Santiago, Chile
- Date: October 30
- Competitors: 11 from 10 nations
- Website: Official website

Medalists
gold medal	Andy Granda (2nd title)	Cuba
silver medal	Francisco Solis	Chile
bronze medal	Rafael Silva	Brazil
bronze medal	José Nova	Dominican Republic

Competition at external databases
- Links: IJF

The men's +100 kg competition of the judo events at the 2023 Pan American Games was held on 30 October at the Contact Sports Center (Centro de Entrenamiento de los Deportes de Contacto) in Santiago, Chile. A total of 11 athletes from 10 NOC's competed.

== Schedule ==
All times are local (UTC−3)

Date	Time	Event
Monday, 30 October 2023	10:00	Elimination round of 16
Monday, 30 October 2023	11:00	Quarterfinals
Monday, 30 October 2023	12:00	Repechage
Monday, 30 October 2023	12:00	Semifinals
Monday, 30 October 2023	15:00	Finals

== Results ==
=== Main Bracket ===
Round of 16
Luis Amézquita (VEN)	00 (yellow card)
Rafael Silva (BRA)	10
Valentino Valdivia (PER)	00
Sergio del Sol (MEX)	10
Philip Horiuchi (USA)	00
Omar Cruz (CUB)	11

Quarter-finals
Andy Granda (CUB)	10
Rafael Silva (BRA)	00 (yellow card)
José Nova (DOM)	20 (yellow card)
Sergio del Sol (MEX)	00 (yellow card)
Freddy Figueroa (ECU)	00 (yellow card)
Marc Deschenes (CAN)	10
Francisco Solis (CHI)	10
Omar Cruz (CUB)	00

Semi-finals
Andy Granda (CUB)	10
José Nova (DOM)	00 (yellow card)
Marc Deschenes (CAN)	00
Francisco Solis (CHI)	10

Gold medal contest
Andy Granda (CUB)	10
Francisco Solis (CHI)	00

=== Repechage ===
Repechage
Rafael Silva (BRA)	10
Sergio del Sol (MEX)	00 (yellow card)
Freddy Figueroa (ECU)	11
Omar Cruz (CUB)	00

Bronze medal contests
Rafael Silva (BRA)	10 (yellow card)
Marc Deschenes (CAN)	00 (yellow card)
Freddy Figueroa (ECU)	00
José Nova (DOM)	10
