= Leonardo Gonçalves =

Brazilian judoka (born 1996)

Personal information
- Born: 1 March 1996 (age 30) Iguape, São Paulo
- Occupation: Judoka
- Height: 190 cm (6 ft 3 in)

Sport
- Country: Brazil
- Sport: Judo
- Weight class: ‍–‍100 kg

Achievements and titles
- Olympic Games: R32 (2024)
- World Champ.: R16 (2025, 2026)
- Pan American Champ.: (gold) (2018, 2025, 2026)
Medal record
Men's judo
Representing Brazil
Olympic Games
| Bronze medal – third place | 2024 Paris | Mixed team |
Pan American Games
| Silver medal – second place | 2023 Santiago | Mixed team |
Pan American Championships
| Gold medal – first place | 2018 San José | ‍–‍100 kg |
| Gold medal – first place | 2023 Calgary | Mixed team |
| Gold medal – first place | 2025 Santiago | ‍–‍100 kg |
| Gold medal – first place | 2026 Panama City | ‍–‍100 kg |
| Silver medal – second place | 2019 Lima | ‍–‍100 kg |
| Silver medal – second place | 2023 Calgary | ‍–‍100 kg |
| Bronze medal – third place | 2017 Panama City | ‍–‍100 kg |
| Bronze medal – third place | 2021 Guadalajara | ‍–‍100 kg |
| Bronze medal – third place | 2024 Rio de Janeiro | ‍–‍100 kg |
South American Games
| Gold medal – first place | 2018 Cochabamba | ‍–‍100 kg |
IJF Grand Slam
| Silver medal – second place | 2025 Paris | ‍–‍100 kg |
| Silver medal – second place | 2025 Baku | ‍–‍100 kg |
| Bronze medal – third place | 2023 Tel Aviv | ‍–‍100 kg |
| Bronze medal – third place | 2025 Abu Dhabi | ‍–‍100 kg |
| Bronze medal – third place | 2026 Astana | ‍–‍100 kg |
IJF Grand Prix
| Gold medal – first place | 2023 Linz | ‍–‍100 kg |
| Gold medal – first place | 2023 Perth | ‍–‍100 kg |
| Gold medal – first place | 2024 Linz | ‍–‍100 kg |
| Silver medal – second place | 2020 Tel Aviv | ‍–‍100 kg |
| Silver medal – second place | 2025 Lima | ‍–‍100 kg |
| Bronze medal – third place | 2018 Tunis | ‍–‍100 kg |
| Bronze medal – third place | 2018 The Hague | ‍–‍100 kg |
| Bronze medal – third place | 2019 Montreal | ‍–‍100 kg |
| Bronze medal – third place | 2023 Zagreb | ‍–‍100 kg |
| Bronze medal – third place | 2025 Guadalajara | ‍–‍100 kg |
| Bronze medal – third place | 2026 Lima | ‍–‍100 kg |
World Juniors Championships
| Silver medal – second place | 2015 Abu Dhabi | ‍–‍100 kg |
Pan American Junior Championships
| Gold medal – first place | 2016 Cordoba | ‍–‍100 kg |

Profile at external databases
- IJF: 24611
- JudoInside.com: 17656
- Updated on 9 October 2026

Leonardo Ribeiro Gonçalves (born 1 March 1996) is a Brazilian judoka.

== Career ==
At the 2015 World Judo Juniors Championships, he won a silver medal in the −100 kg category.

At the 2017 Pan American Judo Championships held in Panama, he won a bronze medal in the Half-heavyweight (100 kg) category.

At the 2018 Pan American Judo Championships held in San José, Costa Rica, Gonçalves won his biggest title, winning a gold medal in the ‍–‍100 kg category.

At the 2018 South American Games held in Cochabamba, Bolivia, he got the title, winning a gold medal in the 100 kg category.

At the 2019 Pan American Judo Championships held in Lima, Peru, he won a silver medal in the Half-heavyweight (100 kg) category.

At the 2019 World Judo Championships held in Tokyo, Japan, making his debut at the Adult World Championships, Gonçalves faced Zelym Kotsoiev, from Azerbaijan, who would later become European champion and World Championships medalist. Gonçalves was currently ranked 17th in the world and his opponent was ranked 18th in the world and had been world junior champion in 2017. Gonçalves lost in his debut.

He did not participate in the 2019 Pan American Games due to an injury to his right elbow.

He was unable to participate in the 2020 Summer Olympics, as Brazil's place in the 100 kg category went to Rafael Buzacarini.

He participated in the 2020 Pan American Judo Championships held in Guadalajara, Mexico, finishing 5th in the 100 kg category.

At the 2021 Pan American Judo Championships held in Guadalajara, Mexico, Gonçalves won a bronze medal in the Half-heavyweight (100 kg) category.

At the 2021 World Judo Championships held in Budapest, Hungary, he lost in his first fight.

At the 2023 Judo Grand Slam Tel Aviv (Grand Slam is the tournament that gives the most points in the judo ranking after the Olympic Games, the World Championships and the World Masters), Gonçalves won his first Grand Slam medal, a bronze.

At the 2023 Pan American-Oceania Judo Championships held in Calgary, Canada, Gonçalves was runner-up in the Half-heavyweight (−100 kg) category and won gold in the mixed team competition representing Brasil.

At the 2023 Pan American Games held in Santiago, he finished 5th in the 100 kg category. He also obtained a silver medal for participating in the mixed team modality.

At the 2024 Pan American-Oceania Judo Championships, he won a bronze medal.

At the 2024 World Judo Championship, Gonçalves debuted against the current world champion, Arman Adamian, from Russia, scoring a waza-ari. But, later, the opponent managed to project the Brazilian twice to turn the score around and win the fight.

At the 2024 Olympic Games, he won bronze in the Mixed Team event.

As of February 2025, he has won two silver medals in Grand Slams, in the 2025 Judo Grand Slam Paris and in the 2025 Judo Grand Slam Baku.

At the 2025 Pan American-Oceania Judo Championships, he won the gold medal, obtaining his second title in this tournament.
