= Michel Augusto =

Brazilian judoka (born 2004)

Personal information
- Full name: Michel Natan Felix Augusto
- Born: 9 November 2004 (age 21) Bastos, São Paulo
- Occupation: Judoka
- Height: 1.62 m (5 ft 4 in)

Sport
- Country: Brazil
- Sport: Judo
- Weight class: ‍–‍60 kg

Achievements and titles
- Olympic Games: R16 (2024)
- World Champ.: 5th (2025)
- Pan American Champ.: (gold) (2024, 2025)
- Highest world ranking: 2^{nd}
Medal record
Men's judo
Representing Brazil
Pan American Games
Gold medal – first place	2023 Santiago	‍–‍60 kg
Pan American Championships
Gold medal – first place	2024 Rio de Janeiro	‍–‍60 kg
Gold medal – first place	2025 Santiago	‍–‍60 kg
Bronze medal – third place	2023 Calgary	‍–‍60 kg
IJF Grand Slam
Silver medal – second place	2025 Tbilisi	‍–‍60 kg
Bronze medal – third place	2026 Lausanne	‍–‍60 kg
IJF Grand Prix
Gold medal – first place	2026 Lima	‍–‍60 kg
Silver medal – second place	2024 Odivelas	‍–‍60 kg
Silver medal – second place	2025 Guadalajara	‍–‍60 kg
Bronze medal – third place	2023 Perth	‍–‍60 kg
Bronze medal – third place	2025 Linz	‍–‍60 kg
Pan American Junior Championships
Gold medal – first place	2023 Calgary	‍–‍60 kg
South American Games
Bronze medal – third place	2022 Asunción	‍–‍60 kg

Profile at external databases
- IJF: 52732
- JudoInside.com: 138158
- Updated on 31 August 2026

Michel Natan Felix Augusto (born 9 November 2004 in Bastos) is a Brazilian judoka.

== Career ==
Augusto started training judo at the age of 6, in 2009, at the Bastos Judo Association.

At the 2022 South American Games held in Asunción, Paraguay, Augusto won a bronze medal in the ‍–‍60 kg category.

At the age of 18, Augusto won a bronze medal at the 2023 Pan American-Oceania Judo Championships held in Calgary.

At the 2023 Pan American Games, Augusto won his biggest title, obtaining the gold medal in the ‍–‍60 kg category.

At the 2024 Pan American-Oceania Judo Championships held in Rio de Janeiro, he obtained his first title in this championship, winning the gold medal.

At the 2024 World Judo Championships, he won two fights (in one of them, defeating the last European champion, Balabay Aghaye (5th in the world)), thus reaching the round of 16, and guaranteeing his qualification for the 2024 Olympic Games.

At the 2024 Olympic Games in Paris, he won his first fight before being eliminated by Japanese Ryuju Nagayama in the round of 16. He returned shortly after his elimination, and thus did not stay for the dispute of teams.

In March 2025 he won the silver medal at 2025 Judo Grand Slam Tbilisi.

At the 2025 Pan American-Oceania Judo Championships, he won the gold medal, obtaining his second title in a row in this tournament.

At the age of 20, participating in the 2025 World Judo Championships, he came close to winning a medal. Augusto reached the semi-finals, losing to the eventual champion of the tournament Ryuju Nagayama. In the dispute for the bronze medal, he suffered an injury (an ankle sprain) and lost the fight due to excessive shidos (punishments), finishing in 5th place.
