= Mary Dee Vargas =

Chilean judoka (born 1996)

Personal information
- Full name: Mary Dee Vargas Ley
- Born: 7 December 1996 (age 29) Santiago, Chile
- Occupation: Judoka

Sport
- Country: Chile
- Sport: Judo
- Weight class: ‍–‍48 kg

Achievements and titles
- Olympic Games: R16 (2020)
- World Champ.: 5th (2022)
- Pan American Champ.: (gold) (2021, 2023, 2024)
Medal record
Women's judo
Representing Chile
Pan American Games
Bronze medal – third place	2019 Lima	‍–‍48 kg
Pan American Championships
Gold medal – first place	2021 Guadalajara	‍–‍48 kg
Gold medal – first place	2023 Calgary	‍–‍48 kg
Gold medal – first place	2024 Rio de Janeiro	‍–‍48 kg
Silver medal – second place	2022 Lima	‍–‍48 kg
Silver medal – second place	2026 Panama City	‍–‍48 kg
Bronze medal – third place	2020 Guadalajara	‍–‍48 kg
Bronze medal – third place	2025 Santiago	‍–‍48 kg
IJF Grand Prix
Gold medal – first place	2025 Lima	‍–‍48 kg
Silver medal – second place	2025 Qingdao	‍–‍48 kg
Bronze medal – third place	2025 Guadalajara	‍–‍48 kg
South American Games
Gold medal – first place	2022 Asunción	‍–‍48 kg
Bronze medal – third place	2018 Cochabamba	‍–‍48 kg
Pan American Junior Championships
Bronze medal – third place	2016 Cordoba	‍–‍48 kg

Profile at external databases
- IJF: 28592
- JudoInside.com: 100845
- Updated on 23 April 2026

Mary Dee Vargas Ley (born 7 December 1996) is a Chilean judoka. She is a five-time medalist, including three gold medals, at the Pan American Judo Championships and a bronze medalist at the 2019 Pan American Games. She represented Chile at the 2020 Summer Olympics in Tokyo, Japan and the 2024 Summer Olympics in Paris, France.

== Career ==
In 2017, Vargas competed in the women's 48 kg event at the World Judo Championships held in Budapest, Hungary. She was eliminated from the competition in her first match by Milica Nikolić of Serbia.

At the 2019 Pan American Games held in Lima, Peru, Vargas won one of the bronze medals in the women's 48 kg event.

In 2020, Vargas won one of the bronze medals in the women's 48 kg event at the Pan American Judo Championships held in Guadalajara, Mexico. In January 2021, she competed in the women's 48 kg event at the 2021 Judo World Masters held in Doha, Qatar. In June 2021, she competed in the women's 48 kg event at the World Judo Championships held in Budapest, Hungary.

Vargas represented Chile at the 2020 Summer Olympics in Tokyo, Japan. She competed in the women's 48 kg event where she was eliminated in her second match.

She competed in the women's 48 kg event at the 2023 World Judo Championships held in Doha, Qatar where she was eliminated in her first match. In 2024, Vargas represented Chile at the Summer Olympics in Paris, France. She was eliminated in her first match in the women's 48 kg event.

== Achievements ==
Year	Tournament	Place	Weight class
2018	South American Games	3rd	−48 kg
2019	Pan American Games	3rd	−48 kg
2020	Pan American Championships	3rd	−48 kg
2021	Pan American Championships	1st	−48 kg
2022	Pan American-Oceania Judo Championships	2nd	−48 kg
2023	Pan American-Oceania Judo Championships	1st	−48 kg
2024	Pan American-Oceania Judo Championships	1st	−48 kg
