= Judo at the 2019 Pan American Games – Men's 100 kg =

Men's 100 kg at the 2019 Pan American Games
- Venue: Polideportivo 3
- Dates: August 11
- Competitors: 9 from 9 nations

Medalists
Gold medal	Thomas Briceño	Chile
Silver medal	L.A. Smith III	United States
Bronze medal	Lewis Medina	Dominican Republic
Bronze medal	Junior Angulo	Ecuador

The men's 100 kg competition of the judo events at the 2019 Pan American Games in Lima, Peru, was held on August 11 at the Polideportivo 3.

== Results ==
All times are local (UTC−5)

=== Bracket ===
Round of 16
Pablo Aprahamian (URU)	00S2
Junior Angulo (ECU)	01S2

Quarter Finals
Lewis Medina (DOM)	01
Junior Angulo (ECU)	10
L.A. Smith III (USA)	10
Alexis Esquivel (MEX)	00
Liester Cardona (CUB)	10
José Arroyo (PER)	00S2
Thomas Briceño (CHI)	10
Carlos Garzón (COL)	00S1

Semi Finals
Junior Angulo (ECU)	00S3
L.A. Smith III (USA)	10S1
Liester Cardona (CUB)	00S1
Thomas Briceño (CHI)	01S2

Final
L.A. Smith III (USA)	01
Thomas Briceño (CHI)	10S1

=== Repechage round ===
Two bronze medals were awarded.

Repechage		Bronze medal
Lewis Medina (DOM)	10
Alexis Esquivel (MEX)	00	Lewis Medina (DOM)	11S2
		Liester Cardona (CUB)	01S3

Repechage		Bronze medal
José Arroyo (PER)	11S1
Carlos Garzón (COL)	00S1	José Arroyo (PER)	00S2
		Junior Angulo (ECU)	01S2
