= Edna Carrillo =

Mexican judoka (born 1991)

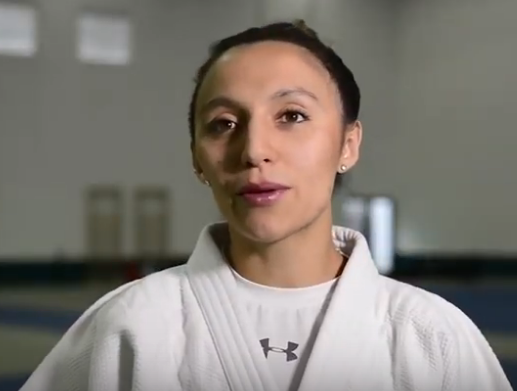

Personal information
- Full name: Edna Guadalupe Carrillo Torres
- Born: 12 November 1991 (age 34) Guadalajara, Jalisco, Mexico
- Occupation: Judoka

Sport
- Country: Mexico
- Sport: Judo
- Weight class: ‍–‍48 kg

Achievements and titles
- Olympic Games: R16 (2016)
- World Champ.: R16 (2014, 2015)
- Pan American Champ.: (2017, 2020, 2023)
Medal record
Women's judo
Representing Mexico
Pan American Games
| Silver medal – second place | 2023 Santiago | ‍–‍48 kg |
| Bronze medal – third place | 2015 Toronto | ‍–‍48 kg |
| Bronze medal – third place | 2019 Lima | ‍–‍48 kg |
Pan American Championships
| Silver medal – second place | 2017 Panama City | ‍–‍48 kg |
| Silver medal – second place | 2020 Guadalajara | ‍–‍48 kg |
| Silver medal – second place | 2023 Calgary | ‍–‍48 kg |
| Bronze medal – third place | 2009 Buenos Aires | ‍–‍48 kg |
| Bronze medal – third place | 2010 San Salvador | ‍–‍48 kg |
| Bronze medal – third place | 2011 Guadalajara | ‍–‍48 kg |
| Bronze medal – third place | 2012 Montreal | ‍–‍48 kg |
| Bronze medal – third place | 2013 San José | ‍–‍48 kg |
| Bronze medal – third place | 2014 Guayaquil | ‍–‍48 kg |
| Bronze medal – third place | 2018 San José | ‍–‍48 kg |
| Bronze medal – third place | 2019 Lima | ‍–‍48 kg |
IJF Grand Prix
| Silver medal – second place | 2017 Cancún | ‍–‍48 kg |
Pan American Junior Championships
| Silver medal – second place | 2009 San Salvador | ‍–‍48 kg |
Central American and Caribbean Games
| Gold medal – first place | 2010 Mayagüez | ‍–‍48 kg |
| Silver medal – second place | 2014 Veracruz | ‍–‍48 kg |

Profile at external databases
- IJF: 3001
- JudoInside.com: 43154
- Updated on 1 November 2023

Edna Guadalupe Carrillo Torres (born 12 November 1991) is a Mexican judoka.

Torres has two bronze from Pan American Games and some minor medals from national and regional tournaments.

== Achievements ==
| Year | Tournament | Place | Weight class |
|---|---|---|---|
| 2009 | Pan American Judo Championships | 3rd | Extra-Lightweight (–48 kg) |
| 2010 | Pan American Judo Championships | 3rd | Extra-Lightweight (–48 kg) |
| 2011 | Pan American Judo Championships | 3rd | Extra-Lightweight (–48 kg) |
