= Juan Postigos =

Peruvian judoka (born 1989)

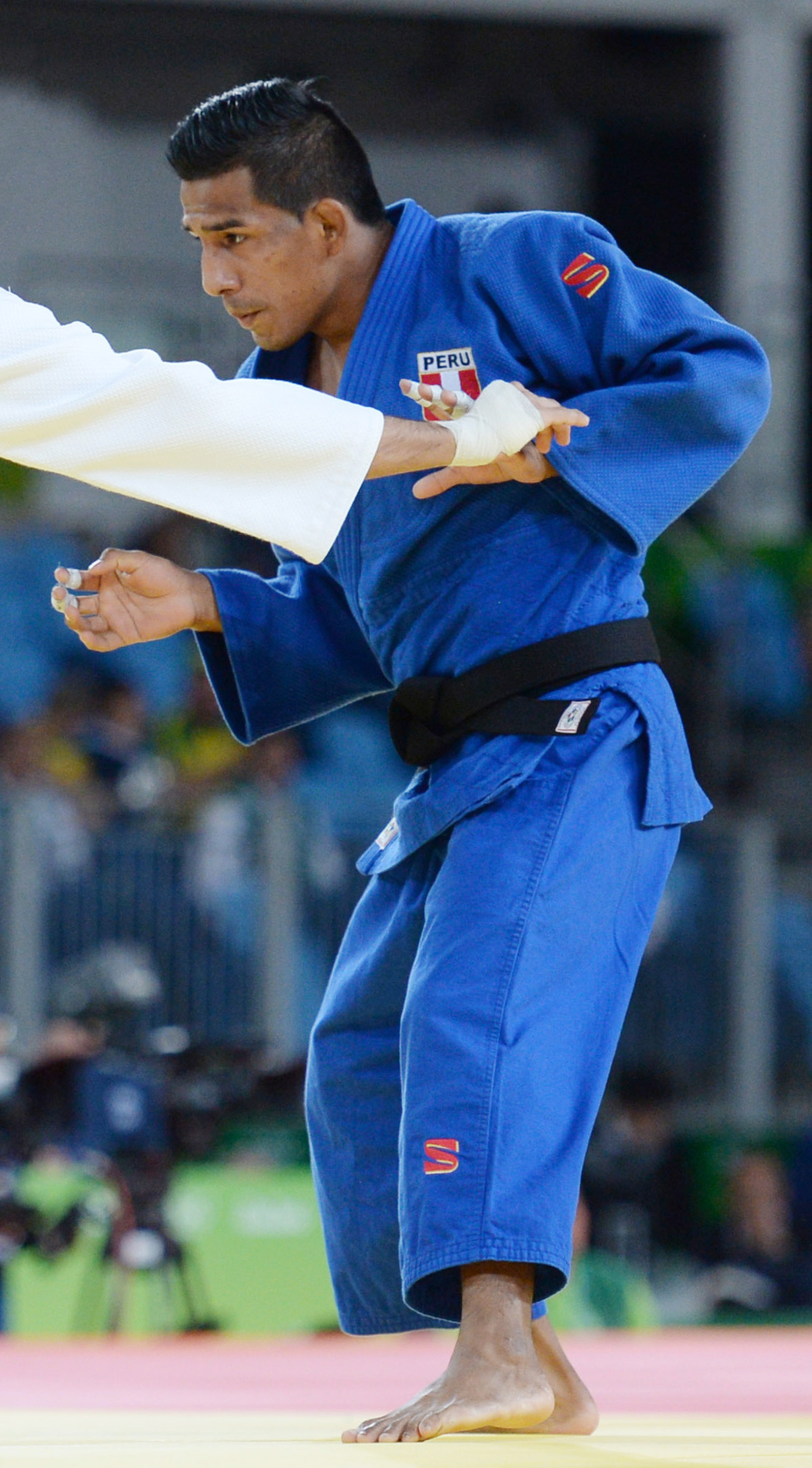
- Postigos at the 2016 Olympics

Personal information
- Full name: Juan Miguel Postigos Acuña
- Nickname: Tigre
- Nationality: Peru
- Born: 13 May 1989 (age 37) Lima, Peru
- Occupation: Judoka
- Height: 160 cm (5 ft 3 in)
- Weight: 60 kg (132 lb)

Sport
- Country: Peru
- Sport: Judo
- Weight class: ‍–‍66 kg
- Club: Pole Espoir Rouen Judo (France)

Achievements and titles
- Olympic Games: R32 (2016, 2020, 2024)
- World Champ.: R32 (2009, 2017)
- Pan American Champ.: (2019, 2022, 2024)
Medal record
Men's judo
Representing Peru
Pan American Games
| Bronze medal – third place | 2011 Guadalajara | ‍–‍60 kg |
Pan American Championships
| Silver medal – second place | 2019 Lima | ‍–‍66 kg |
| Silver medal – second place | 2022 Lima | ‍–‍66 kg |
| Silver medal – second place | 2024 Rio de Janeiro | ‍–‍66 kg |
| Bronze medal – third place | 2010 San Salvador | ‍–‍60 kg |
| Bronze medal – third place | 2016 Havana | ‍–‍60 kg |
| Bronze medal – third place | 2017 Panama City | ‍–‍66 kg |
| Bronze medal – third place | 2021 Guadalajara | ‍–‍66 kg |
IJF Grand Prix
| Bronze medal – third place | 2017 Cancún | ‍–‍66 kg |
South American Junior Championships
| Bronze medal – third place | 2006 Cali | ‍–‍60 kg |

Profile at external databases
- IJF: 4119
- JudoInside.com: 74806
- Updated on 28 July 2024

Juan Miguel Postigos Acuña (born 13 May 1989) is a Peruvian judoka who won a bronze medal at the 2011 Pan American Games. That same year Postigos moved to France seeking better training conditions. He competed at the 2012 and 2016 Olympics, but was eliminated in his first match on both occasions. He was also eliminated in his first match in the men's 66 kg event at the 2020 Summer Olympics in Tokyo, Japan.

Olympic Games
| Preceded by Ornella Oettl Reyes | Flag bearer for Peru; Paris 2024 with María Luisa Doig | Succeeded by Incumbent |
