= 2026 Pan American Judo Championships =

Judo competition

Judo 2026 Pan American Judo Championships
- Location: Panama City, Panama
- Dates: 18–20 April 2026
- No. of events: 15 (7 men, 7 women, 1 mixed)

Competition at external databases
- Links: IJF • JudoInside

The 2026 Pan American Judo Championships is an edition of the Pan American Judo Championships, organised by the Pan American Judo Confederation. It was held in Panama City, Panama from 18 to 20 April 2026.

== Medal summary ==
=== Men's events ===
Event	Gold	Silver	Bronze
Extra-lightweight (−60 kg)	Jonathan Charon (CUB)	Jonathan Yang (USA)	Jairo Moreno (ESA)
Extra-lightweight (−60 kg)	Jonathan Charon (CUB)	Jonathan Yang (USA)	Diego García Ramírez (DOM)
Half-lightweight (−66 kg)	Orlando Polanco (CUB)	Jonathan Benavides (ECU)	Ari Berliner (USA)
Half-lightweight (−66 kg)	Orlando Polanco (CUB)	Jonathan Benavides (ECU)	Joaquín Tovagliari (ARG)
Lightweight (−73 kg)	Daniel Cargnin (BRA)	Jack Yonezuka (USA)	Justin Lemire (CAN)
Lightweight (−73 kg)	Daniel Cargnin (BRA)	Jack Yonezuka (USA)	Guilherme de Oliveira (BRA)
Half-middleweight (−81 kg)	Dominic Rodriguez (USA)	Medickson del Orbe (DOM)	David Lima (BRA)
Half-middleweight (−81 kg)	Dominic Rodriguez (USA)	Medickson del Orbe (DOM)	Johan Silot (USA)
Middleweight (−90 kg)	Robert Florentino (DOM)	John Jayne (USA)	Rafael Macedo (BRA)
Middleweight (−90 kg)	Robert Florentino (DOM)	John Jayne (USA)	Diego Díaz (MEX)
Half-heavyweight (−100 kg)	Leonardo Gonçalves (BRA)	Iván Silva (CUB)	Francisco Balanta (COL)
Half-heavyweight (−100 kg)	Leonardo Gonçalves (BRA)	Iván Silva (CUB)	Oscar Santana (DOM)
Heavyweight (+100 kg)	Francisco Solís (CHI)	Alex Semenenko (USA)	Lucas Lima (BRA)
Heavyweight (+100 kg)	Francisco Solís (CHI)	Alex Semenenko (USA)	Andy Granda (CUB)

=== Women's events ===
Event	Gold	Silver	Bronze
Extra-lightweight (−48 kg)	Clarice Ribeiro (BRA)	Mary Dee Vargas (CHI)	Maria Celia Laborde (USA)
Extra-lightweight (−48 kg)	Clarice Ribeiro (BRA)	Mary Dee Vargas (CHI)	Laura Vasquez (ECU)
Half-lightweight (−52 kg)	Larissa Pimenta (BRA)	Evelyn Beaton (CAN)	Francine Echevarría (PUR)
Half-lightweight (−52 kg)	Larissa Pimenta (BRA)	Evelyn Beaton (CAN)	Paulina Martínez (MEX)
Lightweight (−57 kg)	Shirlen Nascimento (BRA)	Sarah Souza (BRA)	María Villalba (COL)
Lightweight (−57 kg)	Shirlen Nascimento (BRA)	Sarah Souza (BRA)	Ana Rosa García (DOM)
Half-middleweight (−63 kg)	Jessica Klimkait (CAN)	Rafaela Silva (BRA)	Anriquelis Barrios (VEN)
Half-middleweight (−63 kg)	Jessica Klimkait (CAN)	Rafaela Silva (BRA)	Catherine Beauchemin-Pinard (CAN)
Middleweight (−70 kg)	Nauana Silva (BRA)	Esmeralda Damiano Guerrero (DOM)	Charlie Thibault (CAN)
Middleweight (−70 kg)	Nauana Silva (BRA)	Esmeralda Damiano Guerrero (DOM)	Luana Carvalho (BRA)
Half-heavyweight (−78 kg)	Brenda Olaya (COL)	Sairy Colón (PUR)	Beatriz Freitas (BRA)
Half-heavyweight (−78 kg)	Brenda Olaya (COL)	Sairy Colón (PUR)	Coralie Godbout (CAN)
Heavyweight (+78 kg)	Karen León (VEN)	Moira Morillo (DOM)	Karra Hanna (BAH)
Heavyweight (+78 kg)	Karen León (VEN)	Moira Morillo (DOM)	Dayanara Curbelo (CUB)

Source results:

=== Medal table ===
* Host nation (Panama)

Rank	Nation	Gold	Silver	Bronze	Total
1	Brazil (BRA)	6	2	6	14
2	Cuba (CUB)	2	1	2	5
3	United States (USA)	1	4	3	8
4	Dominican Republic (DOM)	1	3	3	7
5	Canada (CAN)	1	1	4	6
6	Chile (CHI)	1	1	0	2
7	Colombia (COL)	1	0	2	3
8	Venezuela (VEN)	1	0	1	2
9	Ecuador (ECU)	0	1	1	2
9	Puerto Rico (PUR)	0	1	1	2
11	Mexico (MEX)	0	0	2	2
12	Argentina (ARG)	0	0	1	1
12	Bahamas (BAH)	0	0	1	1
12	El Salvador (ESA)	0	0	1	1
Totals (14 entries)		14	14	28	56
