= 2019 Pan American Judo Championships =

Judo competition

2019 Judo Pan American Judo Championships
- Venue: Lima
- Location: Lima, Peru
- Dates: 25–27 April 2019
- Competitors: 210 from 27 nations

Competition at external databases
- Links: IJF • JudoInside

The 2019 Pan American Judo Championships was held in Lima, Peru from 25 to 27 April 2019.

== Results ==
=== Men's events ===
Event	Gold	Silver	Bronze
Extra-lightweight (60 kg)	Lenin Preciado; Ecuador	Eric Takabatake; Brazil	Roberto Almenares; Cuba Steven Morocho; Ecuador
Half-lightweight (66 kg)	Daniel Cargnin; Brazil	Juan Postigos; Peru	Orlando Polanco; Cuba Jacob Valois; Canada
Lightweight (73 kg)	Magdiel Estrada; Cuba	Arthur Margelidon; Canada	Antoine Bouchard; Canada Sergio Mattey; Venezuela
Half-middleweight (81 kg)	Antoine Valois-Fortier; Canada	Étienne Briand; Canada	Eduardo Yudi Santos; Brazil Jack Hatton; United States
Middleweight (90 kg)	Iván Felipe Silva Morales; Cuba	Rafael Macedo; Brazil	Robert Florentino; Dominican Republic Zachary Burt; Canada
Half-heavyweight (100 kg)	Shady El Nahas; Canada	Leonardo Gonçalves; Brazil	Liester Cardona; Cuba Thomas Briceño; Chile
Heavyweight (+100 kg)	Rafael Silva; Brazil	David Moura; Brazil	Andy Granda; Cuba Francisco Solis; Chile

=== Women's events ===
Event	Gold	Silver	Bronze
Extra-lightweight (48 kg)	Paula Pareto; Argentina	Nathalia Brigida; Brazil	Edna Carrillo; Mexico Vanesa Godínes; Cuba
Half-lightweight (52 kg)	Larissa Pimenta; Brazil	Angelica Delgado; United States	Brillith Gamarra; Peru Sarah Menezes; Brazil
Lightweight (57 kg)	Christa Deguchi; Canada	Rafaela Silva; Brazil	Anailis Dorvigni; Cuba Ana Rosa García; Dominican Republic
Half-middleweight (63 kg)	Catherine Beauchemin-Pinard; Canada	Maylín del Toro Carvajal; Cuba	Hannah Martin; United States Estefania García; Ecuador
Middleweight (70 kg)	María Pérez; Puerto Rico	Maria Portela; Brazil	Kelita Zupancic; Canada Elvismar Rodríguez; Venezuela
Half-heavyweight (78 kg)	Mayra Aguiar; Brazil	Kaliema Antomarchi; Cuba	Lucia Cantero; Argentina Nefeli Papadakis; United States
Heavyweight (+78 kg)	Idalys Ortiz; Cuba	Maria Suelen Altheman; Brazil	Beatriz Souza; Brazil Melissa Mojica; Puerto Rico

=== Mixed event ===
Event	Gold	Silver	Bronze
Mixed team	Brazil	Cuba	Peru

== Medal table ==
* Host nation (Peru)

Rank	Nation	Gold	Silver	Bronze	Total
1	Brazil (BRA)	5	8	3	16
2	Canada (CAN)	4	2	4	10
3	Cuba (CUB)	3	3	6	12
4	Ecuador (ECU)	1	0	2	3
5	Argentina (ARG)	1	0	1	2
5	Puerto Rico (PUR)	1	0	1	2
7	United States (USA)	0	1	3	4
8	Peru (PER)*	0	1	2	3
9	Chile (CHI)	0	0	2	2
9	Dominican Republic (DOM)	0	0	2	2
9	Venezuela (VEN)	0	0	2	2
12	Mexico (MEX)	0	0	1	1
Totals (12 entries)		15	15	29	59
