= 2024 Pan American-Oceania Judo Championships =

Judo competition

Judo 2024 Pan American-Oceania Judo Championships
- Venue: Carioca Arena 1
- Location: Rio de Janeiro, Brazil
- Dates: 25–28 April 2024
- Competitors: 156 from 26 nations

Competition at external databases
- Links: IJF • JudoInside

The 2024 Pan American-Oceania Judo Championships was a joint edition of the Pan American Judo Championships and the Oceania Judo Championships that was held at the Carioca Arena 1 in Rio de Janeiro, Brazil from 25 to 28 April 2024 as part of the IJF World Tour and during the 2024 Summer Olympics qualification period. The last day of competition featured a mixed team event.

== Medal table ==
* Host nation (Brazil)

Rank	Nation	Gold	Silver	Bronze	Total
1	Brazil (BRA)*	6	3	6	15
2	Canada (CAN)	2	4	2	8
3	Dominican Republic (DOM)	2	0	3	5
4	Australia (AUS)	1	1	0	2
5	Cuba (CUB)	1	0	6	7
6	Puerto Rico (PUR)	1	0	1	2
7	Chile (CHI)	1	0	0	1
8	United States (USA)	0	3	2	5
9	Colombia (COL)	0	2	1	3
10	Peru (PER)	0	1	0	1
11	Ecuador (ECU)	0	0	4	4
12	Mexico (MEX)	0	0	2	2
13	Jamaica (JAM)	0	0	1	1
Totals (13 entries)		14	14	28	56

== Medal summary ==
=== Men's events ===
Event	Gold	Silver	Bronze
Extra-lightweight (−60 kg)	Michel Augusto; Brazil	David Terao; United States	Jonathan Charon; Cuba
Extra-lightweight (−60 kg)	Michel Augusto; Brazil	David Terao; United States	Arath Juárez; Mexico
Half-lightweight (−66 kg)	Willian Lima; Brazil	Juan Postigos; Peru	Lenin Preciado; Ecuador
Half-lightweight (−66 kg)	Willian Lima; Brazil	Juan Postigos; Peru	Juan Hernández; Colombia
Lightweight (−73 kg)	Arthur Margelidon; Canada	Daniel Cargnin; Brazil	Ulises Méndez; Mexico
Lightweight (−73 kg)	Arthur Margelidon; Canada	Daniel Cargnin; Brazil	Antonio Tornal; Dominican Republic
Half-middleweight (−81 kg)	Guilherme Schimidt; Brazil	François Gauthier-Drapeau; Canada	Adrián Gandía; Puerto Rico
Half-middleweight (−81 kg)	Guilherme Schimidt; Brazil	François Gauthier-Drapeau; Canada	Max Stewart; Jamaica
Middleweight (−90 kg)	Robert Florentino; Dominican Republic	John Jayne; United States	Rafael Macedo; Brazil
Middleweight (−90 kg)	Robert Florentino; Dominican Republic	John Jayne; United States	Iván Felipe Silva Morales; Cuba
Half-heavyweight (−100 kg)	Shady El Nahas; Canada	Kyle Reyes; Canada	Leonardo Gonçalves; Brazil
Half-heavyweight (−100 kg)	Shady El Nahas; Canada	Kyle Reyes; Canada	Rafael Buzacarini; Brazil
Heavyweight (+100 kg)	Andy Granda; Cuba	Rafael Silva; Brazil	John Jr. Messé A Bessong; Canada
Heavyweight (+100 kg)	Andy Granda; Cuba	Rafael Silva; Brazil	Freddy Figueroa; Ecuador

Source results:

=== Women's events ===
Event	Gold	Silver	Bronze
Extra-lightweight (−48 kg)	Mary Dee Vargas; Chile	Erika Lasso; Colombia	Amanda Lima; Brazil
Extra-lightweight (−48 kg)	Mary Dee Vargas; Chile	Erika Lasso; Colombia	Maria Celia Laborde; United States
Half-lightweight (−52 kg)	Larissa Pimenta; Brazil	Angelica Delgado; United States	Kelly Deguchi; Canada
Half-lightweight (−52 kg)	Larissa Pimenta; Brazil	Angelica Delgado; United States	Aleanny Carbonell; Cuba
Lightweight (−57 kg)	Rafaela Silva; Brazil	Christa Deguchi; Canada	Mariah Holguin; United States
Lightweight (−57 kg)	Rafaela Silva; Brazil	Christa Deguchi; Canada	Ana Rosa García; Dominican Republic
Half-middleweight (−63 kg)	Katharina Haecker; Australia	Nauana Silva; Brazil	Ketleyn Quadros; Brazil
Half-middleweight (−63 kg)	Katharina Haecker; Australia	Nauana Silva; Brazil	Maylín del Toro Carvajal; Cuba
Middleweight (−70 kg)	María Pérez; Puerto Rico	Aoife Coughlan; Australia	Luana Carvalho; Brazil
Middleweight (−70 kg)	María Pérez; Puerto Rico	Aoife Coughlan; Australia	Celinda Corozo; Ecuador
Half-heavyweight (−78 kg)	Eiraima Silvestre; Dominican Republic	Brenda Olaya; Colombia	Lianet Cardona; Cuba
Half-heavyweight (−78 kg)	Eiraima Silvestre; Dominican Republic	Brenda Olaya; Colombia	Vanessa Chalá; Ecuador
Heavyweight (+78 kg)	Beatriz Souza; Brazil	Ana Laura Portuondo-Isasi; Canada	Moira Morillo; Dominican Republic
Heavyweight (+78 kg)	Beatriz Souza; Brazil	Ana Laura Portuondo-Isasi; Canada	Idalys Ortiz; Cuba

Source results:

=== Mixed events ===
Event	Gold	Silver	Bronze
Mixed team	Brazil	Cuba	—

Source results:
