= 2025 Pan American-Oceania Judo Championships =

Judo competition

Judo 2025 Pan American-Oceania Judo Championships
- Venue: Contact Sports Center
- Location: Santiago, Chile
- Dates: 25–27 April
- Competitors: 206 from 24 nations

Competition at external databases
- Links: IJF • JudoInside

The 2025 Pan American-Oceania Judo Championships is a joint edition of the Pan American Judo Championships and the Oceania Judo Championships that was held at the Contact Sports Center in Santiago, Chile from 25 to 27 April 2025 as part of the IJF World Tour. The last day of competition featured a mixed team event.

== Medal summary ==
=== Men's events ===
Event	Gold	Silver	Bronze
Extra-lightweight (−60 kg)	Michel Augusto; Brazil	Jonathan Charon; Cuba	Jonathan Benavides; Ecuador
Extra-lightweight (−60 kg)	Michel Augusto; Brazil	Jonathan Charon; Cuba	Jonathan Yang; United States
Half-lightweight (−66 kg)	Ronald Lima; Brazil	Diego Calix; El Salvador	Julien Frascadore; Canada
Half-lightweight (−66 kg)	Ronald Lima; Brazil	Diego Calix; El Salvador	Lenin Preciado; Ecuador
Lightweight (−73 kg)	Jack Yonezuka; United States	Daniel Cargnin; Brazil	Antonio Tornal; Dominican Republic
Lightweight (−73 kg)	Jack Yonezuka; United States	Daniel Cargnin; Brazil	Yanis Hachemi; Canada
Half-middleweight (−81 kg)	Gabriel Falcão; Brazil	Keagan Young; Canada	Agustín Gil; Argentina
Half-middleweight (−81 kg)	Gabriel Falcão; Brazil	Keagan Young; Canada	Luan Almeida; Brazil
Middleweight (−90 kg)	Rafael Macedo; Brazil	Mariano Coto; Argentina	Medickson del Orbe; Dominican Republic
Middleweight (−90 kg)	Rafael Macedo; Brazil	Mariano Coto; Argentina	John Jayne; United States
Half-heavyweight (−100 kg)	Leonardo Gonçalves; Brazil	Robert Florentino; Dominican Republic	Francisco Balanta; Colombia
Half-heavyweight (−100 kg)	Leonardo Gonçalves; Brazil	Robert Florentino; Dominican Republic	Ivo Dargoltz; Argentina
Heavyweight (+100 kg)	Andy Granda; Cuba	Rafael Buzacarini; Brazil	Jonathan Loynaz; Cuba
Heavyweight (+100 kg)	Andy Granda; Cuba	Rafael Buzacarini; Brazil	Francisco Solis; Chile

=== Women's events ===
Event	Gold	Silver	Bronze
Extra-lightweight (−48 kg)	Natasha Ferreira; Brazil	Maria Celia Laborde; United States	Mary Dee Vargas; Chile
Extra-lightweight (−48 kg)	Natasha Ferreira; Brazil	Maria Celia Laborde; United States	Laura Vasquez; Ecuador
Half-lightweight (−52 kg)	Evelyn Beaton; Canada	Jéssica Pereira; Brazil	Keisy Perafán; Argentina
Half-lightweight (−52 kg)	Evelyn Beaton; Canada	Jéssica Pereira; Brazil	Agustina Lahiton; Argentina
Lightweight (−57 kg)	Shirlen Nascimento; Brazil	Mariah Holguin; United States	Bianca Reis; Brazil
Lightweight (−57 kg)	Shirlen Nascimento; Brazil	Mariah Holguin; United States	Tinka Easton; Australia
Half-middleweight (−63 kg)	Nauana Silva; Brazil	Catherine Beauchemin-Pinard; Canada	Maylín del Toro; Cuba
Half-middleweight (−63 kg)	Nauana Silva; Brazil	Catherine Beauchemin-Pinard; Canada	Rafaela Silva; Brazil
Middleweight (−70 kg)	Aoife Coughlan; Australia	Celinda Corozo; Ecuador	Luana Carvalho; Brazil
Middleweight (−70 kg)	Aoife Coughlan; Australia	Celinda Corozo; Ecuador	Eliana Aguiar; Venezuela
Half-heavyweight (−78 kg)	Brenda Olaya; Colombia	Coralie Godbout; Canada	Lianet Cardona; Cuba
Half-heavyweight (−78 kg)	Brenda Olaya; Colombia	Coralie Godbout; Canada	Maria Swan; Australia
Heavyweight (+78 kg)	Beatriz Souza; Brazil	Sydnee Andrews; New Zealand	Naomis Elizarde; Cuba
Heavyweight (+78 kg)	Beatriz Souza; Brazil	Sydnee Andrews; New Zealand	Brigitte Carabalí; Colombia

=== Mixed events ===
Event	Gold	Silver	Bronze
Mixed Team	Brazil	Cuba	Mexico

=== Medal table ===
* Host nation (Chile)

Rank	Nation	Gold	Silver	Bronze	Total
1	Brazil (BRA)	10	3	4	17
2	Canada (CAN)	1	3	2	6
3	Cuba (CUB)	1	2	4	7
4	United States (USA)	1	2	2	5
5	Australia (AUS)	1	0	2	3
5	Colombia (COL)	1	0	2	3
7	Argentina (ARG)	0	1	4	5
8	Ecuador (ECU)	0	1	3	4
9	Dominican Republic (DOM)	0	1	2	3
10	El Salvador (ESA)	0	1	0	1
10	New Zealand (NZL)	0	1	0	1
12	Chile (CHI)*	0	0	2	2
13	Mexico (MEX)	0	0	1	1
13	Venezuela (VEN)	0	0	1	1
Totals (14 entries)		15	15	29	59
