= Francisco Solis (judoka) =

Chilean judoka (born 1999)

Personal information
- Nationality: Chilean
- Born: 12 January 1999 (age 27)
- Occupation: Judoka

Sport
- Country: Chile
- Sport: Judo
- Weight class: +100 kg

Achievements and titles
- World Champ.: R32 (2018, 2019, 2023, 2025)
- Pan American Champ.: (gold) (2026)
Medal record
Men's judo
Representing Chile
Pan American Games
Silver medal – second place	2023 Santiago	+100 kg
Pan American Championships
Gold medal – first place	2026 Panama City	+100 kg
Bronze medal – third place	2018 San José	+100 kg
Bronze medal – third place	2019 Lima	+100 kg
Bronze medal – third place	2022 Lima	+100 kg
Bronze medal – third place	2025 Santiago	+100 kg
IJF Grand Prix
Bronze medal – third place	2017 Cancún	+100 kg
Pan American Junior Championships
Gold medal – first place	2018 La Paz	+100 kg
Silver medal – second place	2019 Cali	+100 kg
Bronze medal – third place	2017 Cancún	+100 kg
South American Games
Bronze medal – third place	2022 Asunción	+100 kg

Profile at external databases
- IJF: 37562
- JudoInside.com: 112495
- Updated on 23 April 2026

Francisco Solis (born 12 January 1999) is a Chilean judoka.

He is the bronze medallist of the 2017 Judo Grand Prix Cancún in the +100 kg category.
