= 2023 Pan American-Oceania Judo Championships =

Judo competition

Judo 2023 Pan American-Oceania Judo Championships
- Venue: Canada Olympic Park
- Location: Calgary, Canada
- Dates: 15–17 September 2023
- Competitors: 159 from 23 nations

Competition at external databases
- Links: IJF • JudoInside

The 2023 Pan American-Oceania Judo Championships was a joint edition of the Pan American Judo Championships and the Oceania Judo Championships that was held at the Canada Olympic Park in Calgary, Canada from 15 to 17 September 2023.

== Medal summary ==
=== Men's events ===
Event	Gold	Silver	Bronze
Extra-lightweight (−60 kg)	Matheus Takaki; Brazil	Josh Katz; Australia	Michel Augusto; Brazil
Extra-lightweight (−60 kg)	Matheus Takaki; Brazil	Josh Katz; Australia	Jonathan Charon; Cuba
Half-lightweight (−66 kg)	Julien Frascadore; Canada	Orlando Polanco; Cuba	Willian Lima; Brazil
Half-lightweight (−66 kg)	Julien Frascadore; Canada	Orlando Polanco; Cuba	Juan Hernández; Colombia
Lightweight (−73 kg)	Daniel Cargnin; Brazil	Arthur Margelidon; Canada	Magdiel Estrada; Cuba
Lightweight (−73 kg)	Daniel Cargnin; Brazil	Arthur Margelidon; Canada	Gilberto Cardoso; Mexico
Half-middleweight (−81 kg)	François Gauthier-Drapeau; Canada	Guilherme Schimidt; Brazil	Adrián Gandía; Puerto Rico
Half-middleweight (−81 kg)	François Gauthier-Drapeau; Canada	Guilherme Schimidt; Brazil	Medickson del Orbe; Dominican Republic
Middleweight (−90 kg)	Rafael Macedo; Brazil	Louis Krieber-Gagnon; Canada	John Jayne; United States
Middleweight (−90 kg)	Rafael Macedo; Brazil	Louis Krieber-Gagnon; Canada	Mariano Coto; Argentina
Half-heavyweight (−100 kg)	Shady El Nahas; Canada	Leonardo Gonçalves; Brazil	Nate Keeve; United States
Half-heavyweight (−100 kg)	Shady El Nahas; Canada	Leonardo Gonçalves; Brazil	Thomas Briceño; Chile
Heavyweight (+100 kg)	Andy Granda; Cuba	Rafael Silva; Brazil	Marc Deschenes; Canada
Heavyweight (+100 kg)	Andy Granda; Cuba	Rafael Silva; Brazil	Freddy Figueroa; Ecuador

=== Women's events ===
Event	Gold	Silver	Bronze
Extra-lightweight (−48 kg)	Mary Dee Vargas; Chile	Edna Carrillo; Mexico	Maria Celia Laborde; United States
Extra-lightweight (−48 kg)	Mary Dee Vargas; Chile	Edna Carrillo; Mexico	Natasha Ferreira; Brazil
Half-lightweight (−52 kg)	Larissa Pimenta; Brazil	Paulina Martínez; Mexico	Tinka Easton; Australia
Half-lightweight (−52 kg)	Larissa Pimenta; Brazil	Paulina Martínez; Mexico	Jéssica Pereira; Brazil
Lightweight (−57 kg)	Christa Deguchi; Canada	Rafaela Silva; Brazil	Jessica Klimkait; Canada
Lightweight (−57 kg)	Christa Deguchi; Canada	Rafaela Silva; Brazil	Brisa Gómez; Argentina
Half-middleweight (−63 kg)	Katharina Haecker; Australia	Prisca Awiti Alcaraz; Mexico	Hannah Martin; United States
Half-middleweight (−63 kg)	Katharina Haecker; Australia	Prisca Awiti Alcaraz; Mexico	Maylín del Toro Carvajal; Cuba
Middleweight (−70 kg)	Elvismar Rodríguez; Venezuela	Aoife Coughlan; Australia	Luana Carvalho; Brazil
Middleweight (−70 kg)	Elvismar Rodríguez; Venezuela	Aoife Coughlan; Australia	Celinda Corozo; Ecuador
Half-heavyweight (−78 kg)	Mayra Aguiar; Brazil	Moira de Villiers; New Zealand	Maria Swan; Australia
Half-heavyweight (−78 kg)	Mayra Aguiar; Brazil	Moira de Villiers; New Zealand	Vanessa Chalá; Ecuador
Heavyweight (+78 kg)	Beatriz Souza; Brazil	Idalys Ortiz; Cuba	Sydnee Andrews; New Zealand
Heavyweight (+78 kg)	Beatriz Souza; Brazil	Idalys Ortiz; Cuba	Brigitte Carabalí; Colombia

=== Mixed ===
Event	Gold	Silver	Bronze
Mixed team	Brazil	Cuba	Canada

=== Medal table ===
* Host nation (Canada)

Rank	Nation	Gold	Silver	Bronze	Total
1	Brazil (BRA)	7	4	5	16
2	Canada (CAN)*	4	2	3	9
3	Cuba (CUB)	1	3	3	7
4	Australia (AUS)	1	2	2	5
5	Chile (CHI)	1	0	1	2
6	Venezuela (VEN)	1	0	0	1
7	Mexico (MEX)	0	3	1	4
8	New Zealand (NZL)	0	1	1	2
9	United States (USA)	0	0	4	4
10	Ecuador (ECU)	0	0	3	3
11	Argentina (ARG)	0	0	2	2
11	Colombia (COL)	0	0	2	2
13	Dominican Republic (DOM)	0	0	1	1
13	Puerto Rico (PUR)	0	0	1	1
Totals (14 entries)		15	15	29	59
