= Judo at the 2019 Pan American Games – Women's 48 kg =

Women's 48 kg at the 2019 Pan American Games
- Venue: Polideportivo 3
- Dates: August 8
- Competitors: 10 from 10 nations

Medalists
Gold medal	Estefanía Soriano	Dominican Republic
Silver medal	Vanesa Godines Alemán	Cuba
Bronze medal	Mary Dee Vargas	Chile
Bronze medal	Edna Carrillo	Mexico

The women's 48 kg competition of the judo events at the 2019 Pan American Games in Lima, Peru, was held on August 8 at the Polideportivo 3.

== Results ==
All times are local (UTC−5)

=== Bracket ===
Round of 16
Larissa Farias (BRA)	11
Jacqueline Solís (GUA)	00
Mary Dee Vargas (CHI)	01
Noemí Huayhuameza (PER)	00

Quarter Finals
Paula Pareto (ARG)	01S1
Larissa Farias (BRA)	00S2
Vanesa Godines Alemán (CUB)	10
Anne Suzuki (USA)	00S3
Edna Carrillo (MEX)	00S1
Mary Dee Vargas (CHI)	01S1
Luz Álvarez (COL)	00S2
Estefanía Soriano (DOM)	01S1

Semi Finals
Paula Pareto (ARG)	00S3
Vanesa Godines Alemán (CUB)	10S1
Mary Dee Vargas (CHI)	00S1
Estefanía Soriano (DOM)	10

Final
Vanesa Godines Alemán (CUB)	00S2
Estefanía Soriano (DOM)	01S2

=== Repechage round ===
Two bronze medals were awarded.

Repechage		Bronze medal
Larissa Farias (BRA)	01
Anne Suzuki (USA)	00	Larissa Farias (BRA)	00S2
		Mary Dee Vargas (CHI)	01S2

Repechage		Bronze medal
Edna Carrillo (MEX)	10S2
Luz Álvarez (COL)	00S3	Edna Carrillo (MEX)	10
		Paula Pareto (ARG)	00
