= Thomas Briceño =

Chilean judoka (born 1993)

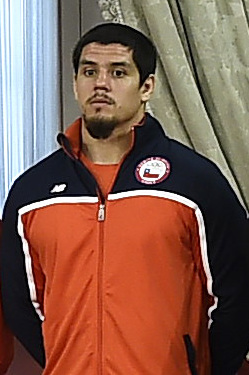

Personal information
- Nationality: Chilean
- Born: 16 September 1993 (age 33)
- Occupation: Judoka

Sport
- Country: Chile
- Sport: Judo
- Weight class: ‍–‍90 kg, ‍–‍100 kg

Achievements and titles
- Olympic Games: R32 (2016, 2024)
- World Champ.: R32 (2018)
- Pan American Champ.: (silver) (2021)
Medal record
Men's judo
Representing Chile
Pan American Games
Gold medal – first place	2019 Lima	‍–‍100 kg
Silver medal – second place	2023 Santiago	‍–‍100 kg
Pan American Championships
Silver medal – second place	2021 Guadalajara	‍–‍100 kg
Bronze medal – third place	2016 Havana	‍–‍90 kg
Bronze medal – third place	2019 Lima	‍–‍100 kg
Bronze medal – third place	2023 Calgary	‍–‍100 kg
IJF Grand Slam
Bronze medal – third place	2012 Rio de Janeiro	‍–‍90 kg
South American Games
Bronze medal – third place	2022 Asunción	‍–‍100 kg
South American Junior Championships
Bronze medal – third place	2013 Buenos Aires	‍–‍90 kg
Pan American Junior Championships
Silver medal – second place	2013 Buenos Aires	‍–‍90 kg
Bronze medal – third place	2010 Buena Vista	‍–‍90 kg

Profile at external databases
- IJF: 10231
- JudoInside.com: 71190
- Updated on 3 August 2024

Thomas Briceño (born 16 September 1993) is a Chilean judoka.

Briceño competed at the 2016 Summer Olympics in Rio de Janeiro, in the men's 90 kg.
