= 2025 Judo Grand Slam Tbilisi =

Judo competition

Judo 2025 Judo Grand Slam Tbilisi
- Venue: Olympic Palace
- Location: Tbilisi, Georgia
- Dates: 21–23 March 2025
- Competitors: 385 from 53 nations
- Total prize money: €154,000

Competition at external databases
- Links: IJF • EJU • JudoInside

The 2025 Judo Grand Slam Tbilisi is a Judo Grand Slam tournament that was held at the Olympic Palace in Tbilisi, Georgia, from 21 to 23 March 2025 as part of the IJF World Tour.

== Medal summary ==
=== Men's events ===
Event	Gold	Silver	Bronze
Extra-lightweight (−60 kg)	Luka Mkheidze (FRA)	Michel Augusto (BRA)	Jonathan Charon (CUB)
Extra-lightweight (−60 kg)	Luka Mkheidze (FRA)	Michel Augusto (BRA)	Emiel Jaring (NED)
Half-lightweight (−66 kg)	Abrek Naguchev (IJF)	Temur Nozadze (GEO)	Azizbek Ortikov (UZB)
Half-lightweight (−66 kg)	Abrek Naguchev (IJF)	Temur Nozadze (GEO)	Abdurakhim Nutfulloev (UZB)
Lightweight (−73 kg)	Lasha Shavdatuashvili (GEO)	Armen Agaian (IJF)	Samuel Gaßner (AUT)
Lightweight (−73 kg)	Lasha Shavdatuashvili (GEO)	Armen Agaian (IJF)	Leonardo Valeriani (ITA)
Half-middleweight (−81 kg)	Vedat Albayrak (TUR)	Petru Pelivan (MDA)	Irakli Beroshvili (GEO)
Half-middleweight (−81 kg)	Vedat Albayrak (TUR)	Petru Pelivan (MDA)	Zaur Dvalashvili (GEO)
Middleweight (−90 kg)	Umar Bozorov (UZB)	Alexis Mathieu (FRA)	Rafael Macedo (BRA)
Middleweight (−90 kg)	Umar Bozorov (UZB)	Alexis Mathieu (FRA)	Giorgi Jabniashvili (GEO)
Half-heavyweight (−100 kg)	Anton Savytskiy (UKR)	Simeon Catharina (NED)	Kyle Reyes (CAN)
Half-heavyweight (−100 kg)	Anton Savytskiy (UKR)	Simeon Catharina (NED)	Arman Adamian (IJF)
Heavyweight (+100 kg)	Inal Tasoev (IJF)	Guram Tushishvili (GEO)	Jur Spijkers (NED)
Heavyweight (+100 kg)	Inal Tasoev (IJF)	Guram Tushishvili (GEO)	Irakli Demetrashvili (GEO)

=== Women's events ===
Event	Gold	Silver	Bronze
Extra-lightweight (−48 kg)	Ganbaataryn Narantsetseg (MGL)	Eva Pérez Soler (ESP)	Shirine Boukli (FRA)
Extra-lightweight (−48 kg)	Ganbaataryn Narantsetseg (MGL)	Eva Pérez Soler (ESP)	Tara Babulfath (SWE)
Half-lightweight (−52 kg)	Amandine Buchard (FRA)	Gefen Primo (ISR)	Naomi van Krevel (NED)
Half-lightweight (−52 kg)	Amandine Buchard (FRA)	Gefen Primo (ISR)	Ariane Toro (ESP)
Lightweight (−57 kg)	Eteri Liparteliani (GEO)	Martha Fawaz (FRA)	Nino Loladze (GEO)
Lightweight (−57 kg)	Eteri Liparteliani (GEO)	Martha Fawaz (FRA)	Marica Perišić (SRB)
Half-middleweight (−63 kg)	Catherine Beauchemin-Pinard (CAN)	Manon Deketer (FRA)	Maylín del Toro (CUB)
Half-middleweight (−63 kg)	Catherine Beauchemin-Pinard (CAN)	Manon Deketer (FRA)	Clarisse Agbegnenou (FRA)
Middleweight (−70 kg)	Szofi Özbas (HUN)	Sanne van Dijke (NED)	Adelina Novitzki (ISR)
Middleweight (−70 kg)	Szofi Özbas (HUN)	Sanne van Dijke (NED)	Madina Taimazova (IJF)
Half-heavyweight (−78 kg)	Metka Lobnik (SLO)	Brenda Olaya (COL)	Patrícia Sampaio (POR)
Half-heavyweight (−78 kg)	Metka Lobnik (SLO)	Brenda Olaya (COL)	Fanny Estelle Posvite (FRA)
Heavyweight (+78 kg)	Romane Dicko (FRA)	Elis Startseva (IJF)	Julia Tolofua (FRA)
Heavyweight (+78 kg)	Romane Dicko (FRA)	Elis Startseva (IJF)	Marit Kamps (NED)

=== Medal table ===
* Host nation (Georgia)

Rank	Nation	Gold	Silver	Bronze	Total
1	France (FRA)	3	3	4	10
2	Georgia (GEO)*	2	2	5	9
3	International Judo Federation (IJF)	2	2	2	6
4	Uzbekistan (UZB)	1	0	2	3
5	Canada (CAN)	1	0	1	2
6	Hungary (HUN)	1	0	0	1
6	Mongolia (MGL)	1	0	0	1
6	Slovenia (SLO)	1	0	0	1
6	Turkey (TUR)	1	0	0	1
6	Ukraine (UKR)	1	0	0	1
11	Netherlands (NED)	0	2	4	6
12	Brazil (BRA)	0	1	1	2
12	Israel (ISR)	0	1	1	2
12	Spain (ESP)	0	1	1	2
15	Colombia (COL)	0	1	0	1
15	Moldova (MDA)	0	1	0	1
17	Cuba (CUB)	0	0	2	2
18	Austria (AUT)	0	0	1	1
18	Italy (ITA)	0	0	1	1
18	Portugal (POR)	0	0	1	1
18	Serbia (SRB)	0	0	1	1
18	Sweden (SWE)	0	0	1	1
Totals (22 entries)		14	14	28	56

== Prize money ==
The sums written are per medalist, bringing the total prizes awarded to €154,000. (retrieved from:)

Medal	Total	Judoka	Coach
Gold	€5,000	€4,000	€1,000
Silver	€3,000	€2,400	€600
Bronze	€1,500	€1,200	€300
