= 2026 Judo Grand Prix Lima =

Judo Competition

Judo 2026 Judo Grand Prix Lima
- Venue: Villa Deportiva Nacional
- Location: Lima, Peru
- Dates: 14–16 August 2026
- Competitors: 296 from 50 nations
- Total prize money: €98,000

Competition at external databases
- Links: IJF • JudoInside

The 2026 Judo Grand Prix Lima was held at the Villa Deportiva Nacional arena in Lima, Peru from 14 to 16 August 2026 as part of the IJF World Tour and during the 2028 Summer Olympics qualification period.

== Medal summary ==
=== Men's events ===
Event	Gold	Silver	Bronze
Extra-lightweight (−60 kg)	Michel Augusto (BRA)	Jonathan Yang (USA)	Andrea Carlino (ITA)
Extra-lightweight (−60 kg)	Michel Augusto (BRA)	Jonathan Yang (USA)	Christopher Velazco (USA)
Half-lightweight (−66 kg)	Radu Izvoreanu (MDA)	Denis Vieru (MDA)	Miguel Nery Gago (POR)
Half-lightweight (−66 kg)	Radu Izvoreanu (MDA)	Denis Vieru (MDA)	Jonathan Benavides (ECU)
Lightweight (−73 kg)	Vlad Mitru (MDA)	Jack Yonezuka (USA)	Guilherme de Oliveira (BRA)
Lightweight (−73 kg)	Vlad Mitru (MDA)	Jack Yonezuka (USA)	Giovanni Esposito (ITA)
Half-middleweight (−81 kg)	David Lima (BRA)	François Gauthier-Drapeau (CAN)	Johan Silot (USA)
Half-middleweight (−81 kg)	David Lima (BRA)	François Gauthier-Drapeau (CAN)	Petru Pelivan (MDA)
Middleweight (−90 kg)	Rafael Macedo (BRA)	Mihail Latișev (MDA)	Kenny Komi Bedel (ITA)
Middleweight (−90 kg)	Rafael Macedo (BRA)	Mihail Latișev (MDA)	Guilherme Schimidt (BRA)
Half-heavyweight (−100 kg)	Gennaro Pirelli (ITA)	Daniele Accogli (ITA)	Leonardo Gonçalves (BRA)
Half-heavyweight (−100 kg)	Gennaro Pirelli (ITA)	Daniele Accogli (ITA)	Yuta Kasai (JPN)
Heavyweight (+100 kg)	Giannis Antoniou (CYP)	Mikita Sviryd (CRO)	Denis Batchaev (RUS)
Heavyweight (+100 kg)	Giannis Antoniou (CYP)	Mikita Sviryd (CRO)	Stefan Kovinić (MNE)

=== Women's events ===
Event	Gold	Silver	Bronze
Extra-lightweight (−48 kg)	Assunta Scutto (ITA)	Maria Celia Laborde (USA)	Catarina Costa (POR)
Extra-lightweight (−48 kg)	Assunta Scutto (ITA)	Maria Celia Laborde (USA)	Sarah Ischt (GER)
Half-lightweight (−52 kg)	Rafaela Rodrigues (BRA)	Francine Echevarría (PUR)	Driulys Rivas (PER)
Half-lightweight (−52 kg)	Rafaela Rodrigues (BRA)	Francine Echevarría (PUR)	Tihea Topolovec (CRO)
Lightweight (−57 kg)	Pihla Salonen (FIN)	Adriana Rodríguez Salvador (ESP)	Jéssica Lima (BRA)
Lightweight (−57 kg)	Pihla Salonen (FIN)	Adriana Rodríguez Salvador (ESP)	Marica Perišić (SRB)
Half-middleweight (−63 kg)	Seiko Watanabe (JPN)	Laura Vázquez (ESP)	Laurence Biron (CAN)
Half-middleweight (−63 kg)	Seiko Watanabe (JPN)	Laura Vázquez (ESP)	Anriquelis Barrios (VEN)
Middleweight (−70 kg)	Dena Pohl (GER)	Nauana Silva (BRA)	Serafima Moscalu (ROU)
Middleweight (−70 kg)	Dena Pohl (GER)	Nauana Silva (BRA)	Giorgia Stangherlin (ITA)
Half-heavyweight (−78 kg)	Mathilda Sophie Niemeyer (GER)	Fanny Estelle Posvite (FRA)	Marie Branser (GUI)
Half-heavyweight (−78 kg)	Mathilda Sophie Niemeyer (GER)	Fanny Estelle Posvite (FRA)	Brenda Olaya (COL)
Heavyweight (+78 kg)	Beatriz Souza (BRA)	Asya Tavano (ITA)	Raz Hershko (ISR)
Heavyweight (+78 kg)	Beatriz Souza (BRA)	Asya Tavano (ITA)	Thauana Silva (BRA)

=== Medal table ===
* Host nation (Peru)

Rank	Nation	Gold	Silver	Bronze	Total
1	Brazil (BRA)	5	1	5	11
2	Italy (ITA)	2	2	4	8
3	Moldova (MDA)	2	2	1	5
4	Germany (GER)	2	0	1	3
5	Japan (JPN)	1	0	1	2
6	Cyprus (CYP)	1	0	0	1
6	Finland (FIN)	1	0	0	1
8	United States (USA)	0	3	2	5
9	Spain (ESP)	0	2	0	2
10	Canada (CAN)	0	1	1	2
10	Croatia (CRO)	0	1	1	2
12	France (FRA)	0	1	0	1
12	Puerto Rico (PUR)	0	1	0	1
14	Portugal (POR)	0	0	2	2
15	Colombia (COL)	0	0	1	1
15	Ecuador (ECU)	0	0	1	1
15	Guinea (GUI)	0	0	1	1
15	Israel (ISR)	0	0	1	1
15	Montenegro (MNE)	0	0	1	1
15	Peru (PER)*	0	0	1	1
15	Romania (ROU)	0	0	1	1
15	Russia (RUS)	0	0	1	1
15	Serbia (SRB)	0	0	1	1
15	Venezuela (VEN)	0	0	1	1
Totals (24 entries)		14	14	28	56

== Prize money ==
The sums written are per medalist, bringing the total prizes awarded to €98,000. (retrieved from:)

Medal	Total	Judoka	Coach
Gold	€3,000	€2,400	€600
Silver	€2,000	€1,600	€400
Bronze	€1,000	€800	€200
