= Elvismar Rodríguez =

Venezuelan judoka

Personal information
- Born: 14 Feb 1997 (age 29) Puerto Ordaz, Bolivar, Venezuela
- Occupation: Judoka

Sport
- Country: Venezuela
- Sport: Judo
- Weight class: ‍–‍70 kg

Achievements and titles
- Olympic Games: R32 (2016, 2020)
- World Champ.: 5th (2023)
- Pan American Champ.: (gold) (2022, 2023)
Medal record
Women's judo
Representing Venezuela
Pan American Games
Gold medal – first place	2019 Lima	‍–‍70 kg
Bronze medal – third place	2023 Santiago	‍–‍70 kg
Pan American Championships
Gold medal – first place	2022 Lima	‍–‍70 kg
Gold medal – first place	2023 Calgary	‍–‍70 kg
Silver medal – second place	2018 San José	‍–‍70 kg
Bronze medal – third place	2016 Havana	‍–‍70 kg
Bronze medal – third place	2017 Panama City	‍–‍70 kg
Bronze medal – third place	2019 Lima	‍–‍70 kg
Bronze medal – third place	2020 Guadalajara	‍–‍70 kg
IJF Grand Slam
Silver medal – second place	2017 Baku	‍–‍70 kg
Bronze medal – third place	2016 Baku	‍–‍70 kg
Bronze medal – third place	2016 Tyumen	‍–‍70 kg
Bronze medal – third place	2016 Tokyo	‍–‍70 kg
Bronze medal – third place	2017 Paris	‍–‍70 kg
Bronze medal – third place	2019 Abu Dhabi	‍–‍70 kg
Bronze medal – third place	2021 Tashkent	‍–‍70 kg
Bronze medal – third place	2021 Antalya	‍–‍70 kg
Bronze medal – third place	2022 Baku	‍–‍70 kg
IJF Grand Prix
Gold medal – first place	2016 Budapest	‍–‍70 kg
Silver medal – second place	2017 Tbilisi	‍–‍70 kg
Silver medal – second place	2017 Antalya	‍–‍70 kg
Silver medal – second place	2023 Almada	‍–‍70 kg
Bronze medal – third place	2016 Samsun	‍–‍70 kg
Bronze medal – third place	2017 Cancún	‍–‍70 kg
Bronze medal – third place	2018 Tashkent	‍–‍70 kg
Bronze medal – third place	2019 Antalya	‍–‍70 kg
Bronze medal – third place	2019 Tashkent	‍–‍70 kg
Bronze medal – third place	2022 Zagreb	‍–‍70 kg
Bronze medal – third place	2026 Zagreb	‍–‍78 kg
Pan American Junior Championships
Bronze medal – third place	2017 Cancún	‍–‍70 kg
Pan American Cadet Championships
Gold medal – first place	2013 Buenos Aires	‍–‍70 kg
Youth Olympic Games
Bronze medal – third place	2014 Nanjing	‍–‍78 kg

Profile at external databases
- IJF: 12074
- JudoInside.com: 64700
- Updated on 15 November 2026

Elvismar Nicanor Rodríguez Ruiz is a judoka from Venezuela. She represented her country in the 2016 Summer Olympics in the Women's 70 kg competition, but lost to Antónia Moreira of Angola in the first round via ippon. She also competed in the women's 70 kg event at the 2020 Summer Olympics in Tokyo, Japan.

In 2020, Rodríguez won one of the bronze medals in the women's 70 kg event at the 2020 Pan American Judo Championships held in Guadalajara, Mexico.
