= Judo at the 2023 Pan American Games =

Judo Judo at the 2023 Pan American Games
- Venue: Centro de Entrenamiento de los Deportes de Contacto
- Location: Santiago, Chile
- Start date: October 28
- End date: October 31
- No. of events: 15 (7 men, 7 women, 1 mixed)
- Competitors: 148 from 20 nations
- Website: Official website

Competition at external databases
- Links: IJF • JudoInside

Judo competitions at the 2023 Pan American Games in Santiago, Chile will be held at the Centro de Entrenamiento de los Deportes de Contacto, which will also host the Taekwondo and Karate events, from 28 to 31 October 2023.

15 medal events were contested: seven weight categories each for men and women and one event for mixed teams. The mixed teams was held for the first time ever.

== Qualification system ==
A total of up to 154 judokas will qualify to compete at the games. One quota per each weight category were directly allocated to the gold medal winners in the Cali 2021 Junior Pan American Games. The top nine athletes (one per NOC) in each weight category's ranking after the four best results among eleven qualification tournaments will qualify along with one spot per category for the host nation, Chile. Each nation can enter a maximum of 14 athletes (seven men and seven women), except for NOCs whose athletes qualified by quota for Cali 2021 and may have a maximum of two athletes in one weight category.

== Participating nations ==
A total of 20 countries/teams qualified judokas. The number of athletes a nation has entered is in parentheses beside the name of the country or team.

- Argentina (10)
- Brazil (19)
- Canada (7)
- Chile (14)
- Colombia (10)
- Costa Rica (1)
- Cuba (11)
- Dominican Republic (10)
- Ecuador (11)
- El Salvador (2)
- Haiti (1)
- Independent Athletes Team (2)
- Mexico (12)
- Nicaragua (2)
- Panama (2)
- Peru (7)
- Puerto Rico (3)
- United States (14)
- Uruguay (1)
- Venezuela (9)

== Medal table ==
* Host nation (Chile)

Rank	Nation	Gold	Silver	Bronze	Total
1	Brazil	7	3	6	16
2	Cuba	6	0	1	7
3	Canada	1	2	2	5
4	Venezuela	1	0	1	2
5	Chile*	0	3	0	3
6	Colombia	0	2	3	5
6	Mexico	0	2	3	5
8	Puerto Rico	0	2	0	2
9	Argentina	0	1	0	1
10	Dominican Republic	0	0	6	6
11	United States	0	0	3	3
12	Ecuador	0	0	2	2
12	Panama	0	0	2	2
14	Peru	0	0	1	1
Totals (14 entries)		15	15	30	60

== Medalists ==
=== Men's events ===
Event	Gold	Silver	Bronze
60 kg	Michel Augusto; Brazil	Johan Rojas; Colombia	Arath Juárez; Mexico
60 kg	Michel Augusto; Brazil	Johan Rojas; Colombia	Juan Ayala; Ecuador
66 kg	Willis García; Venezuela	Julien Frascadore; Canada	Orlando Polanco; Cuba
66 kg	Willis García; Venezuela	Julien Frascadore; Canada	Willian Lima; Brazil
73 kg	Gabriel Falcão; Brazil	Daniel Cargnin; Brazil	Antoine Bouchard; Canada
73 kg	Gabriel Falcão; Brazil	Daniel Cargnin; Brazil	Gilberto Cardoso; Mexico
81 kg	Guilherme Schimidt; Brazil	Jorge Pérez; Chile	David Popovici; Canada
81 kg	Guilherme Schimidt; Brazil	Jorge Pérez; Chile	Medickson del Orbe; Dominican Republic
90 kg	Iván Felipe Silva Morales; Cuba	Rafael Macedo; Brazil	Alexander Knauf; United States
90 kg	Iván Felipe Silva Morales; Cuba	Rafael Macedo; Brazil	Robert Florentino; Dominican Republic
100 kg	Shady El Nahas; Canada	Thomas Briceño; Chile	Kayo Santos; Brazil
100 kg	Shady El Nahas; Canada	Thomas Briceño; Chile	Francisco Balanta; Colombia
+100 kg	Andy Granda; Cuba	Francisco Solis; Chile	Rafael Silva; Brazil
+100 kg	Andy Granda; Cuba	Francisco Solis; Chile	José Nova; Dominican Republic

=== Women's events ===
Event	Gold	Silver	Bronze
48 kg	Alexia Nascimento; Brazil	Edna Carrillo; Mexico	Maria Celia Laborde; United States
48 kg	Alexia Nascimento; Brazil	Edna Carrillo; Mexico	Amanda Lima; Brazil
52 kg	Larissa Pimenta; Brazil	Paulina Martínez; Mexico	Angelica Delgado; United States
52 kg	Larissa Pimenta; Brazil	Paulina Martínez; Mexico	Lilian Cordones; Panama
57 kg	Rafaela Silva; Brazil	Brisa Gómez; Argentina	Kristine Jiménez; Panama
57 kg	Rafaela Silva; Brazil	Brisa Gómez; Argentina	María Villalba; Colombia
63 kg	Maylín del Toro Carvajal; Cuba	Isabelle Harris; Canada	Prisca Awiti Alcaraz; Mexico
63 kg	Maylín del Toro Carvajal; Cuba	Isabelle Harris; Canada	Ketleyn Quadros; Brazil
70 kg	Idelannis Gómez; Cuba	María Pérez; Puerto Rico	Elvismar Rodríguez; Venezuela
70 kg	Idelannis Gómez; Cuba	María Pérez; Puerto Rico	Celinda Corozo; Ecuador
78 kg	Samanta Soares; Brazil	Sairy Colón; Puerto Rico	Camila Figueroa; Peru
78 kg	Samanta Soares; Brazil	Sairy Colón; Puerto Rico	Eiraima Silvestre; Dominican Republic
+78 kg	Idalys Ortiz; Cuba	Brigitte Carabalí; Colombia	Moira Morillo; Dominican Republic
+78 kg	Idalys Ortiz; Cuba	Brigitte Carabalí; Colombia	Beatriz Souza; Brazil

=== Mixed ===
Games	Gold	Silver	Bronze
Mixed team	Cuba; Lianet Cardona; Liester Cardona; Omar Cruz; Magdiel Estrada; Andy Granda; Idelannis Gómez; Maikel McKenzie; Idalys Ortíz; Orlando Polanco; Iván Felipe Silva Morales; Maylín del Toro Carvajal	Brazil; Daniel Cargnin; Luana Carvalho; Aléxia Castilhos; Gabriel Falcão; Leonardo Gonçalves; Willian Lima; Rafael Macedo; Larissa Pimenta; Guilherme Schimidt; Rafael Silva; Rafaela Silva; Samanta Soares; Beatriz Souza	Dominican Republic; Robert Florentino; Moira Morillo; Medickson del Orbe; Elmert Ramírez; Ana Rosa García; Ariela Sánchez; Eiraima Silvestre; Estefanía Soriano; Antonio Tornal
Mixed team	Cuba; Lianet Cardona; Liester Cardona; Omar Cruz; Magdiel Estrada; Andy Granda; Idelannis Gómez; Maikel McKenzie; Idalys Ortíz; Orlando Polanco; Iván Felipe Silva Morales; Maylín del Toro Carvajal	Brazil; Daniel Cargnin; Luana Carvalho; Aléxia Castilhos; Gabriel Falcão; Leonardo Gonçalves; Willian Lima; Rafael Macedo; Larissa Pimenta; Guilherme Schimidt; Rafael Silva; Rafaela Silva; Samanta Soares; Beatriz Souza	Colombia; Francisco Balanta; Luisa Bonilla; Brigitte Carabalí; Daniel Paz; Andrés Sandoval; María Villalba

== See also ==
- Judo at the 2023 Parapan American Games
- Judo at the 2024 Summer Olympics
