= Judo at the Pan American Games =

- No. of events: 14 (men: 7; women: 7)

Judo has been a part of the Pan American Games since 1963 edition in São Paulo, Brazil, but only for men. Women's competition started on 1983, in Caracas, Venezuela.

== Medal table ==
Updated after the 2023 Pan American Games.

Rank	Nation	Gold	Silver	Bronze	Total
1	Cuba	74	26	57	157
2	Brazil	47	39	64	150
3	United States	32	30	56	118
4	Canada	16	26	47	89
5	Argentina	5	11	29	45
6	Venezuela	3	15	29	47
7	Puerto Rico	3	10	11	24
8	Mexico	3	7	18	28
9	Dominican Republic	3	7	16	26
10	Ecuador	2	5	11	18
11	Chile	1	3	3	7
12	Colombia	0	7	12	19
13	Peru	0	1	5	6
14	Haiti	0	1	3	4
15	Netherlands Antilles	0	1	2	3
16	Panama	0	0	4	4
17	Uruguay	0	0	3	3
18	Costa Rica	0	0	1	1
18	El Salvador	0	0	1	1
18	Honduras	0	0	1	1
Totals (20 entries)		189	189	373	751
