= Judo at the 2022 Commonwealth Games =

- Judo pictogram for the Games
- Venue: Coventry Arena
- Location: Coventry, England
- Dates: 1–3 August 2022
- Competitors: 160 from 36 nations

Judo at the 2022 Commonwealth Games was the fifth appearance of that Judo at the Commonwealth Games. The judo competition at the 2022 Commonwealth Games was held in Birmingham, England, from 1 to 3 August 2022. This was the fifth edition of the sport since it was introduced as a demonstration sport in 1986, and made official at the next edition in 1990. Its second appearance within England specifically, spread across fourteen weight categories. At the World Judo Championships each country can enter up to 2 participants per weight. The sport awarded two bronze medals, one for the winner from repechage and another for the athlete who won the third place combat.

It will be the first time that Judo will become a core sport at the Commonwealth Games, previously classified as an optional sport in three previous editions.

== Schedule ==
The competition schedule is as follows:

Preliminaries, quarter-finals, semi-finals & repechages	Medal matches

Men
Date Event	Mon 1		Tue 2		Wed 3	
Session →	M	E	M	E	M	E
60 kg						
66 kg						
73 kg						
81 kg						
90 kg						
100 kg						
+100 kg						

Women
Date Event	Mon 1		Tue 2		Wed 3	
Session →	M	E	M	E	M	E
48 kg						
52 kg						
57 kg						
63 kg						
70 kg						
78 kg						
+78 kg						

== Venue ==
The judo competitions was held at the Coventry Arena in Coventry. The wrestling competitions will also take place there, whilst the adjacent Coventry Stadium will play host to rugby sevens.

== Medal summary ==
=== Medal table ===
* Host nation (England)

Rank	CGA	Gold	Silver	Bronze	Total
1	England*	5	3	5	13
2	Canada	4	3	1	8
3	Australia	2	0	8	10
4	Scotland	1	1	2	4
5	South Africa	1	0	1	2
6	Cyprus	1	0	0	1
7	India	0	2	1	3
8	Mauritius	0	1	2	3
8	New Zealand	0	1	2	3
10	Wales	0	1	1	2
11	Jamaica	0	1	0	1
11	The Gambia	0	1	0	1
13	Northern Ireland	0	0	2	2
14	Malaysia	0	0	1	1
14	Malta	0	0	1	1
14	Pakistan	0	0	1	1
Totals (16 entries)		14	14	28	56

=== Men ===
Event	Gold	Silver	Bronze
60 kg	Ashley McKenzie; England	Samuel Hall; England	Josh Katz; Australia
60 kg	Ashley McKenzie; England	Samuel Hall; England	Vijay Kumar Yadav; India
66 kg	Georgios Balarjishvili; Cyprus	Finlay Allan; Scotland	Nathan Katz; Australia
66 kg	Georgios Balarjishvili; Cyprus	Finlay Allan; Scotland	Nathon Burns; Northern Ireland
73 kg	Daniel Powell; England	Faye Njie; The Gambia	Jake Bensted; Australia
73 kg	Daniel Powell; England	Faye Njie; The Gambia	Amir Majeed; Malaysia
81 kg	Lachlan Moorhead; England	François Gauthier-Drapeau; Canada	Mohab Elnahas; Canada
81 kg	Lachlan Moorhead; England	François Gauthier-Drapeau; Canada	Uros Nikolic; Australia
90 kg	Jamal Petgrave; England	Remi Feuillet; Mauritius	Shah Hussain Shah; Pakistan
90 kg	Jamal Petgrave; England	Remi Feuillet; Mauritius	Harrison Cassar; Australia
100 kg	Shady Elnahas; Canada	Kyle Reyes; Canada	Rhys Thompson; England
100 kg	Shady Elnahas; Canada	Kyle Reyes; Canada	Harry Lovell-Hewitt; England
+100 kg	Marc Deschenes; Canada	Kody Andrews; New Zealand	Sebastien Perrinne; Mauritius
+100 kg	Marc Deschenes; Canada	Kody Andrews; New Zealand	Liam Park; Australia

=== Women ===
Event	Gold	Silver	Bronze
48 kg	Geronay Whitebooi; South Africa	Shushila Likmabam; India	Amy Platten; England
48 kg	Geronay Whitebooi; South Africa	Shushila Likmabam; India	Katryna Esposito; Malta
52 kg	Tinka Easton; Australia	Kelly Deguchi; Canada	Yasmin Javadian; Northern Ireland
52 kg	Tinka Easton; Australia	Kelly Deguchi; Canada	Charne Griesel; South Africa
57 kg	Christa Deguchi; Canada	Acelya Toprak; England	Christianne Legentil; Mauritius
57 kg	Christa Deguchi; Canada	Acelya Toprak; England	Malin Wilson; Scotland
63 kg	Catherine Beauchemin-Pinard; Canada	Gemma Howell; England	Katharina Haecker; Australia
63 kg	Catherine Beauchemin-Pinard; Canada	Gemma Howell; England	Jasmine Hacker-Jones; Wales
70 kg	Aoife Coughlan; Australia	Ebony Drysdale Daley; Jamaica	Katie-Jemima Yeats-Brown; England
70 kg	Aoife Coughlan; Australia	Ebony Drysdale Daley; Jamaica	Kelly Petersen-Pollard; England
78 kg	Emma Reid; England	Natalie Powell; Wales	Moira de Villiers; New Zealand
78 kg	Emma Reid; England	Natalie Powell; Wales	Rachel Tytler; Scotland
+78 kg	Sarah Adlington; Scotland	Tulika Maan; India	Sydnee Andrews; New Zealand
+78 kg	Sarah Adlington; Scotland	Tulika Maan; India	Abigail Paduch; Australia

== Participating nations ==
There were 36 participating Commonwealth Games Associations (CGA's) in judo with a total of 160 (97 men and 63 women) athletes. The number of athletes a nation entered is in parentheses beside the name of the country.

- Australia (11)
- Bahamas (2)
- Barbados (1)
- Botswana (2)
- Cameroon (5)
- Canada (9)
- Cyprus (6)
- England (14)
- Fiji (3)
- The Gambia (2)
- Ghana (5)
- India (6)
- Jamaica (3)
- Kenya (2)
- Malawi (2)
- Malaysia (2)
- Malta (2)
- Mauritius (8)
- Mozambique (3)
- Nauru (3)
- New Zealand (7)
- Nigeria (4)
- Northern Ireland (7)
- Pakistan (2)
- Samoa (1)
- Seychelles (2)
- Scotland (11)
- Sierra Leone (2)
- Solomon Islands (1)
- South Africa (4)
- Sri Lanka (5)
- Tanzania (2)
- Trinidad and Tobago (4)
- Vanuatu (6)
- Wales (6)
- Zambia (5)
