= Saya Middleton =

Australian judoka (born 2003)

Personal information
- Born: 5 June 2003 (age 23)
- Occupation: Judoka

Sport
- Country: Australia
- Sport: Judo
- Weight class: ‍–‍63 kg

Achievements and titles
- World Champ.: R64 (2026)
- Oceania Champ.: (bronze) (2026)
- Commonwealth Games: (silver) (2026)
Medal record
Women's judo
Representing Australia
Oceania Championships
Bronze medal – third place	2026 Melbourne	‍–‍63 kg
Pan American Junior Championships
Bronze medal – third place	2022 Lima	‍–‍63 kg
Bronze medal – third place	2023 Calgary	‍–‍70 kg
Commonwealth Games
Silver medal – second place	2026 Glasgow	‍–‍63 kg

Profile at external databases
- IJF: 48432
- JudoInside.com: 124634
- Updated on 7 October 2026

Saya Middleton (born 5 June 2003) is an Australian judoka.

== Early life ==
Middleton's parents, Peter and Cathy have owned and run the Judo International club in Perth since 2004. Her younger brother, Vas, is also a judoka.

== Career ==
In April 2026, Middleton competed at the 2026 Oceania Judo Championships and won a bronze medal in the –‍63 kg category. In June 2026, she was selected to represent Australia at the 2026 Commonwealth Games, along with her brother, Vas. She won a silver medal in the –‍63 kg category. During the final, Canada's Laurence Biron won by penalty as Middleton accumulated the maximum three penalties in a scoreless match.
