= Tevita Takayawa =

Fijian judoka (born 1996)

Personal information
- Born: 18 May 1996 (age 30)
- Occupation: Judoka
- Father: Viliame Takayawa
- Relatives: Nacanieli Takayawa-Qerawaqa (brother)

Sport
- Country: Fiji
- Sport: Judo
- Weight class: ‍–‍100 kg

Achievements and titles
- Olympic Games: R32 (2020)
- World Champ.: R32 (2021)
- Oceania Champ.: (gold) (2018)
Medal record
Men's judo
Representing Fiji
Oceania Championships
Gold medal – first place	2018 Nouméa	‍–‍100 kg
Bronze medal – third place	2017 Nukuʻalofa	‍–‍100 kg
IJF Grand Prix
Bronze medal – third place	2022 Perth	‍–‍100 kg

Profile at external databases
- IJF: 12863
- JudoInside.com: 45443
- Updated on 30 June 2026

Tevita Takayawa (born 18 May 1996) is a Fijian judoka.

From a family with a strong tradition in judo, as Takayawa's father Viliame Takayawa represented Fiji at the Olympic Games in 1984 and 1988, and his older brother Nacanieli Takayawa-Qerawaqa also competed in judo at the Olympic Games in 1992, 1996 and 2000 and won a Commonwealth Games gold medal in 2002. His niece, and Nacianieli's daughter, Shanice Takawaya also competes in Judo. After being selected to compete at the 2020 Summer Games Tevita Takayawa was drawn against Aleksandar Kukolj in the opening round.
