= Unnati Sharma =

Indian judoka

Personal information
- Born: 25 March 2003 (age 23)
- Occupation: Judoka

Sport
- Country: India
- Sport: Judo
- Weight class: ‍–‍63 kg

Achievements and titles
- Asian Champ.: R16 (2025)
- Commonwealth Games: (bronze) (2026)
Medal record
Women's judo
Representing India
Asian Cadet Championships
Bronze medal – third place	2019 Taipei	‍–‍63 kg
Commonwealth Games
Bronze medal – third place	2026 Glasgow	‍–‍63 kg

Profile at external databases
- IJF: 45395
- JudoInside.com: 123291
- Updated on 2 August 2026

Unnati Sharma (born 25 March 2003) is an Indian judoka who competes in the women's 63 kg category. She won a bronze medal in the women's 63 kg event at the 2026 Commonwealth Games. She has also won a gold medal at the 2026 Dakar African Open.

== Life and career ==
Unnati Sharma was born on 25 March 2003. Sharma competes in the women's 63 kg category on the International Judo Federation World Tour.

In January 2019, Sharma won the bronze medal in the 63 kg category in the National Judo Championships in Visakhapatnam. In July 2019, she won the bronze medal in the same weight class in the Asia Oceania Under-18 Judo Championships at Taipei. Later, in October, she won the gold medal in the 63 kg category in the National Under-18 Judo Championships in Imphal, and followed it up with the gold medal in the same weight class in the National Under-21 Judo Championships in Lucknow two months later.

In April 2023, Sharma won the silver medal in the 63 kg category in the Asian Open event at Kuwait. In July 2023, she won a gold medal in the Under-21 Asian Cup in Macau and a bronze medal in the Under-21 Asian Cup event in Hong Kong. In November 2025, she won a bronze in the Asian Open at Hong Kong.

In March 2026, Sharma won the gold medal in the 63 kg category at the African Open at Dakar. Following her performances on the international circuit, Sharma represented India at the 2026 Commonwealth Games in Glasgow. In the women's 63 kg event, she defeated Lamelula Magagula of Eswatini in the round of 16 by ippon and Qona Christie of New Zealand in the quarter-finals. However, she lost to Saya Middleton of Australia in the semi-finals. She defeated South Africa's Skye Knoester by ippon in the bronze-medal bout to win the bronze medal.
