= Pan American-Oceania Judo Championships =

The Pan American-Oceania Judo Championships may refer to:

- OJU Senior Championships
- Pan American Judo Championships
