= Judo at the 2022 Commonwealth Games – Women's 70 kg =

Judo competition

Judo – Women's 70 kg at the 2022 Commonwealth Games
- Venue: Coventry Arena
- Date: 2 August 2022
- Competitors: 7 from 6 nations

Medalists
gold medal	Aoife Coughlan	Australia
silver medal	Ebony Drysdale Daley	Jamaica
bronze medal	Katie-Jemima Yeats-Brown	England
bronze medal	Kelly Petersen Pollard	England

The women's 70 kg judo competitions at the 2022 Commonwealth Games in Birmingham, England took place on August 3 at the Coventry Arena. A total of 7 competitors from 6 nations took part.

== Results ==
The draw is as follows:

Quarter-finals
Rachael Hawkes (NIR)	00 (yellow card)
Ebony Drysdale Daley (JAM)	10 (yellow card)
Aoife Coughlan (AUS)	10
Joy Asonye (NGR)	00
Katie-Jemima Yeats-Brown (ENG)	10
Shanice Takawaya (FIJ)	00 (yellow card)

Semi-finals
Kelly Petersen Pollard (ENG)	00
Ebony Drysdale Daley (JAM)	10
Aoife Coughlan (AUS)	10
Katie-Jemima Yeats-Brown (ENG)	00

Final
Ebony Drysdale Daley (JAM)	00
Aoife Coughlan (AUS)	10 (yellow card)

=== Repechages ===
Repechage
Joy Asonye (NGR)	10 (yellow card)
Shanice Takawaya (FIJ)	00

Bronze medal
Rachael Hawkes (NIR)	00 (yellow card)
Katie-Jemima Yeats-Brown (ENG)	10
Joy Asonye (NGR)	00
Kelly Petersen Pollard (ENG)	10
