= Asian-Pacific Judo Championships =

Pan American-Oceania Judo Championships may refer to:

- OJU Senior Championships
- Asian Judo Championships
