= Christa Deguchi =

Canadian judoka (born 1995)

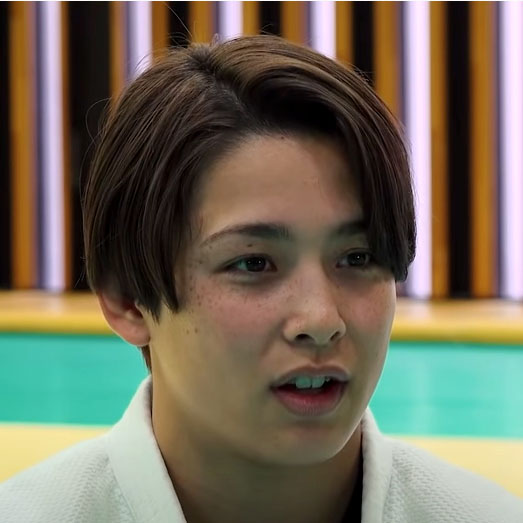
- Deguchi in 2020

Personal information
- Nationality: Canadian
- Born: 29 October 1995 (age 31) Shiojiri, Nagano, Japan
- Occupation: Judoka
- Height: 160 cm (5 ft 3 in)

Sport
- Country: Japan (until 2014); Canada (since 2017)
- Sport: Judo
- Weight class: ‍–‍57 kg

Achievements and titles
- Olympic Games: (gold) (2024)
- World Champ.: (gold) (2019, 2023)
- Pan American Champ.: (gold) (2018, 2019, 2023)
- Commonwealth Games: (gold) (2022)
- Highest world ranking: 1^{st}
Medal record
Women's judo
Representing Canada
Olympic Games
Gold medal – first place	2024 Paris	‍–‍57 kg
World Championships
Gold medal – first place	2019 Tokyo	‍–‍57 kg
Gold medal – first place	2023 Doha	‍–‍57 kg
Silver medal – second place	2024 Abu Dhabi	‍–‍57 kg
Bronze medal – third place	2018 Baku	‍–‍57 kg
Pan American Championships
Gold medal – first place	2018 San José	‍–‍57 kg
Gold medal – first place	2019 Lima	‍–‍57 kg
Gold medal – first place	2023 Calgary	‍–‍57 kg
Silver medal – second place	2024 Rio de Janeiro	‍–‍57 kg
World Masters
Gold medal – first place	2022 Jerusalem	‍–‍57 kg
IJF Grand Slam
Gold medal – first place	2018 Paris	‍–‍57 kg
Gold medal – first place	2019 Paris	‍–‍57 kg
Gold medal – first place	2019 Ekaterinburg	‍–‍57 kg
Gold medal – first place	2020 Paris	‍–‍57 kg
Gold medal – first place	2021 Antalya	‍–‍57 kg
Gold medal – first place	2022 Baku	‍–‍57 kg
Gold medal – first place	2023 Ulaanbaatar	‍–‍57 kg
Gold medal – first place	2023 Tokyo	‍–‍57 kg
Gold medal – first place	2024 Baku	‍–‍57 kg
Gold medal – first place	2024 Antalya	‍–‍57 kg
Gold medal – first place	2024 Astana	‍–‍57 kg
Silver medal – second place	2023 Tel Aviv	‍–‍57 kg
Silver medal – second place	2023 Antalya	‍–‍57 kg
Silver medal – second place	2023 Abu Dhabi	‍–‍57 kg
Silver medal – second place	2024 Paris	‍–‍57 kg
Bronze medal – third place	2021 Tbilisi	‍–‍57 kg
Bronze medal – third place	2024 Tbilisi	‍–‍57 kg
IJF Grand Prix
Gold medal – first place	2018 Hohhot	‍–‍57 kg
Gold medal – first place	2018 Zagreb	‍–‍57 kg
Gold medal – first place	2019 Montreal	‍–‍57 kg
Gold medal – first place	2022 Zagreb	‍–‍57 kg
Bronze medal – third place	2018 Budapest	‍–‍57 kg
Commonwealth Games
Gold medal – first place	2022 Birmingham	‍–‍57 kg
Representing Japan
IJF Grand Slam
Bronze medal – third place	2013 Tokyo	‍–‍57 kg
IJF Grand Prix
Gold medal – first place	2013 Jeju	‍–‍57 kg
World Juniors Championships
Silver medal – second place	2014 Fort Lauderdale	‍–‍57 kg
Bronze medal – third place	2013 Ljubljana	‍–‍57 kg

Profile at external databases
- IJF: 41546, 14821
- JudoInside.com: 83508
- Updated on 31 July 2024

Christa Deguchi (出口 クリスタ Deguchi Christa, born 29 October 1995) is a Japanese-born Canadian judoka. She is the reigning Olympic champion in the women's 57 kg event, after winning gold at the 2024 Summer Olympics in Paris. Her victory made her the first ever Canadian to win gold in judo at the Olympics.

Though competing for Canada, Deguchi still lives and trains in Shiojiri, Japan.

== Early life ==
Deguchi was born in Japan to a Canadian father and Japanese mother. Her younger sister Kelly Deguchi was born shortly after, and is also a judoka for Canada.

== Career ==
In 2012, Deguchi was first approached to represent Canada in judo. She competed for Japan at the time and refused to switch. Realizing her best bet to make the Olympics would be competing for Canada, Deguchi eventually agreed to represent Canada in 2017.

Deguchi participated at the 2018 World Judo Championships, winning a bronze medal. This made her the first female judoka representing Canada to win a World Judo Championships medal. She won her first gold medal in the 2019 world championship

In 2021, she won the gold medal in her event at the 2021 Judo Grand Slam Antalya held in Antalya, Turkey. In August 2022, competing in her first major multi-sport event, the 2022 Commonwealth Games, Deguchi won the gold medal, defeating Acelya Toprak of England in the gold medal match of the 57 kg event.

In 2022, she won gold at the 2022 Judo Grand Slam Baku.

In 2024, she won gold at the 2024 Summer Olympics – Women's 57 kg

On March 24, 2026, she announced her retirement from professional judo, together with her sister Kelly.

== International results ==
=== Representing Canada ===
As of 27 August 2019

International Medals
	1st place, gold medalist(s)	2nd place, silver medalist(s)	3rd place, bronze medalist(s)
World Championships	1	0	1
World Masters	0	0	0
Grand Slam	3	0	0
Continental Championships	2	0	0
Grand Prix	3	0	1
Continental Open	1	0	0
Totals	10	0	2

Tournament	2017	2018	2019
World Judo Championships		3rd place, bronze medalist(s)	1st place, gold medalist(s)
Pan American Judo Championships		1st place, gold medalist(s)	1st place, gold medalist(s)
World Masters		2R	
Grand Slam Abu Dhabi	2R		
Grand Slam Ekaterinburg			1st place, gold medalist(s)
Grand Slam Osaka		5	
Grand Slam Paris		1st place, gold medalist(s)	1st place, gold medalist(s)
Grand Slam Tokyo	1R		
Grand Prix Budapest		3rd place, bronze medalist(s)	
Grand Prix Hohhot		1st place, gold medalist(s)	
Grand Prix Montreal			1st place, gold medalist(s)
Grand Prix Zagreb		1st place, gold medalist(s)	WD
European Open Odivelas		1st place, gold medalist(s)	

=== Representing Japan ===
Tournament	2011	2013	2014
World U21 Championships		3rd place, bronze medalist(s)	2nd place, silver medalist(s)
World Junior Team Championships		1st place, gold medalist(s)	1st place, gold medalist(s)
Grand Slam Tokyo		3rd place, bronze medalist(s)	
Grand Slam Tyumen			5
Grand Prix Jeju		1st place, gold medalist(s)	
European Open Rome			2nd place, silver medalist(s)
Tournament Aix-En-Provence U20	1st place, gold medalist(s)		

== See also ==
- Judo in Canada
- List of Canadian judoka
