= Josh Katz =

Australian Olympic judoka (born 1997)

Personal information
- Nickname: Katzy
- Born: 29 December 1997 (age 28) Baulkham Hills, New South Wales, Australia
- Education: University of Canberra; La Trobe University
- Occupation: Judoka
- Height: 167 cm (5 ft 6 in)
- Weight: 60 kg (132 lb)
- Website: www.teamkatz.com.au

Sport
- Sport: Judo
- Weight class: ‍–‍60 kg
- Club: Budokan Judo Club
- Coached by: Nathan Katz

Achievements and titles
- Olympic Games: R32 (2016, 2024)
- World Champ.: R16 (2019)
- Oceania Champ.: (gold) (2015, 2016, 2017, 2018); (silver) (2023)
- Commonwealth Games: (silver) (2026)
Medal record
Men's judo
Representing Australia
Pan American-Oceania Championships
Silver medal – second place	2023 Calgary	‍–‍60 kg
Bronze medal – third place	2022 Lima	‍–‍60 kg
Oceania Championships
Gold medal – first place	2015 Nouvelle	‍–‍60 kg
Gold medal – first place	2016 Canberra	‍–‍60 kg
Gold medal – first place	2017 Nukuʻalofa	‍–‍60 kg
Gold medal – first place	2018 Nouméa	‍–‍60 kg
Oceania Junior Championships
Gold medal – first place	2012 Cairns	‍–‍55 kg
Gold medal – first place	2013 Apia	‍–‍55 kg
Gold medal – first place	2014 Auckland	‍–‍60 kg
Gold medal – first place	2015 Nouvelle	‍–‍60 kg
Commonwealth Games
Silver medal – second place	2026 Glasgow	‍–‍60 kg
Bronze medal – third place	2022 Birmingham	‍–‍60 kg

Profile at external databases
- IJF: 12339
- JudoInside.com: 20803
- Updated on 1 August 2026

Joshua Katz (born 29 December 1997) is an Australian Olympic judoka, who competes at −60 kg. He has won 11 Oceania titles and 12 Australian titles as of February 2024. He also won the 2022 Commonwealth Games bronze medal and the 2023 Pan American-Oceania Judo Championships silver medal.

== Early and personal life ==
Katz was born on 29 December 1997 in Baulkham Hills, New South Wales, Australia, to a Jewish family. Katz's mother is former judoka Kerrye Katz, who competed at the 1988 Summer Olympics, when judo was a demonstration event for women, and came in seventh; she also won the 1985 Oceania Judo Championship in U66k and 11 Australian national championships. His father Robert was a judoka on the Australian national team and a national judo coach for Australia at both the 1988 Seoul Olympics and the 2016 Rio Olympics. His older brother, Nathan Katz, also competed for Australia in judo at the Rio Olympics. The two brothers have been training partners since they were children.

His high school was William Clarke College, in Kellyville. Katz studied sports and exercise science and sports management at the University of Canberra and has attended La Trobe University, studying for a Bachelor of Exercise Science. He also lived in Northmead, New South Wales, and moved to Melbourne in 2022 to train at the newly opened national training centre. He is 167 cm (5 ft 6 in) tall and weighs 60 kg (132 lb).

== Judo career ==
Katz's judo club is the Budokan Judo Club, in Castle Hill, New South Wales, and his coach is his brother Nathan Katz. He had won 11 Oceania titles and 12 Australian titles as of February 2024. He also won the 2022 Commonwealth Games bronze medal and the 2023 Pan American-Oceania Judo Championships silver medal.

=== Early years; National and Oceania championships ===
Katz won the 2013 and 2014 Australian junior national judo championships and the 2015, 2017, 2019, and 2022 Australian National Judo Championships. He also won the 2012, 2013, 2014, and 2015 Junior Oceania Judo Championships. He won the 2015, 2016, 2017, and 2018 senior Oceania Judo Championships. He also was named the 2010 New South Wales Junior Boy of the Year and received the 2010 Hills Shire Times Young Achiever Award.

=== 2016 Rio Olympics ===
Katz competed at the 2016 Rio Olympics in the men's 60 kg event at 18 years of age, months after he finished high school. He was eliminated in the second round by Diyorbek Urozboev of Uzbekistan, who went on to win the bronze medal, and came in 17th in the tournament. He was Australia’s youngest-ever male judoka to compete at an Olympic Games, and was also the youngest judoka from any nation at those Games. He and his brother Nathan became the first brothers to compete in judo for Australia at the same Olympic Games. Competing at Rio, Katz suffered torn shoulder ligaments.

=== 2017–23 ===
Katz won the 2017 Canberra Junior ACT Cup. He won the gold medal in the 2018 Perth Oceania Open, won a silver medal in the 2018 Hong Kong Asian Open, and won a bronze medal in the 2018 Malaga Senior European Cup.

In 2021, Katz did not make the Australian Olympic team for the Tokyo Olympic Games, because he was injured. He then broke his leg in September 2022, and also had shoulder surgery in 2022.

Competing in judo at the 2022 Commonwealth Games in the men's 60 kg in Birmingham, England, in August, he won a bronze medal, after not having competed for six months due to injuries. In 2022 he also won the Australian national championship, a bronze medal at the European Open in February in Sarajevo, Bosnia and Herzegovina; a silver medal at the European Open in February in Warsaw, Poland, and a bronze medal at the 2022 Pan American-Oceania Judo Championships in April in Lima, Peru. In November 2022, in a competition he suffered elbow ligament and tendon damage, necessitating surgery, and ending his season.

Katz had a second shoulder surgery in March 2023. In September 2023, competing in the 2023 Pan American-Oceania Judo Championships in Calgary, Canada, he won a silver medal.

=== 2024–present; Paris Olympics ===
In January 2024, Katz suffered a completely ruptured ACL in his knee.

At the April 2024 Pan American and Oceania Championships he returned to competition, and came in fifth. On 8 June 2024, winning a silver medal at the 2024 Abidjan African Open in the Ivory Coast, he qualified for the 2024 Olympics.

In July 2024 he competed again in the 2024 Paris Olympics at Men's 60 kg and was defeated in the first round, 1–0.
