= Judo at the 2026 Commonwealth Games – Women's 63 kg =

Judo competition

Judo – Women's 63 kg at the 2026 Commonwealth Games
- Venue: SEC Centre, Glasgow
- Date: August 1 2026
- Competitors: 15 from 13 nations

Medalists
gold medal	Laurence Biron	Canada
silver medal	Saya Middleton	Australia
bronze medal	Unnati Sharma	India
bronze medal	Enku Ekuta	Nigeria

The Women's 63 kg judo competitions at the 2026 Commonwealth Games in Glasgow, Scotland took place on August 1 at the SEC Centre. Fifteen judoka from thirteen nations will enter.

== Seedings ==
The following judoka were seeded in advance of the draw:

Women's 63 kg
Seed	Judoka	Nation
1	Maeve Coughlan	Australia
2	Qona Christie	New Zealand
3	Saya Middleton	Australia
4	Laurence Biron	Canada
5	Skye Knoester	South Africa
6	Enku Ekuta	Nigeria
7	Millie Bayliss	Wales
8	Unnati Sharma	India

== Results ==
=== Gold final path ===
Round of 16
Rita Kabinda (ZAM)	100
Lauren Semple (JAM)	000 (yellow card)
Laurence Biron (CAN)	101
Sophie Wood (SCO)	000 (yellow card)
Skye Knoester (RSA)	w/o
~~Elizabeth Oduro (GHA)~~	DSQ
Unnati Sharma (IND)	100
Lamelula Magagula (SWZ)	000
Saya Middleton (AUS)	010 (yellow card)
Sunny Doig (SCO)	001
Enku Ekuta (NGR)	100
Georgina Samo George (SOL)	000

Quarterfinals
Maeve Coughlan (AUS)	000
Rita Kabinda (ZAM)	011 (yellow card)
Laurence Biron (CAN)	002
Skye Knoester (RSA)	001 (yellow card)
Qona Christie (NZL)	000
Unnati Sharma (IND)	011
Saya Middleton (AUS)	100
Enku Ekuta (NGR)	000

Semifinal
Rita Kabinda (ZAM)	000 (yellow card)
Laurence Biron (CAN)	101
Unnati Sharma (IND)	001
Saya Middleton (AUS)	101 (yellow card)

Gold medal final
Laurence Biron (CAN)	100 (yellow card)
Saya Middleton (AUS)	000

=== Repechage/bronze medal path ===
Competitors who are eliminated by either finalist enter the repechage to contest for the bronze medals.

Repechage
Maeve Coughlan (AUS)	000
Skye Knoester (RSA)	100 (yellow card)
Qona Christie (NZL)	000 (yellow card)
Enku Ekuta (NGR)	010

Bronze medal
Skye Knoester (RSA)	000
Unnati Sharma (IND)	100
Enku Ekuta (NGR)	110 (yellow card)
Rita Kabinda (ZAM)	000 (yellow card)
