= 2025 Judo Oceania Open Gold Coast =

Judo Competition

Judo 2025 Judo Gold Coast Oceania Open
- Venue: Carrara Indoor Stadium
- Location: Gold Coast, Queensland, Australia
- Dates: 1–2 November 2025
- Competitors: 124 from 22 nations

Competition at external databases
- Links: IJF • JudoInside

The 2025 Judo Oceania Open Gold Coast was a judo competition held at the Carrara Indoor Stadium in Gold Coast, Queensland, Australia, from 1 to 2 November 2025 as part of the IJF World Tour. Like the 2019, 2022 and 2023 Judo Oceania Open Perth before it, this "Continental Open" level event's rules were those of a Grand Prix level event, and it awarded ranking points as one.

== Medal summary ==
=== Men's events ===
Event	Gold	Silver	Bronze
Extra-lightweight (−60 kg)	Yang Yung-wei (TPE)	Maxime Merlin (FRA)	Christopher Velazco (USA)
Extra-lightweight (−60 kg)	Yang Yung-wei (TPE)	Maxime Merlin (FRA)	Chu Wei-jie (TPE)
Half-lightweight (−66 kg)	Georgios Balarjishvili (CYP)	Luukas Saha (FIN)	Lin Chong-you (TPE)
Half-lightweight (−66 kg)	Georgios Balarjishvili (CYP)	Luukas Saha (FIN)	Lenny Sheynfeld (USA)
Lightweight (−73 kg)	Justin Lemire (CAN)	Joshua Green (IRL)	Masayuki Terada (THA)
Lightweight (−73 kg)	Justin Lemire (CAN)	Joshua Green (IRL)	Kohsei Toyoshima (AUS)
Half-middleweight (−81 kg)	Eetu Ihanamäki (FIN)	Dominic Rodriguez (USA)	Keishin Ochi (AUS)
Half-middleweight (−81 kg)	Eetu Ihanamäki (FIN)	Dominic Rodriguez (USA)	Johan Silot (USA)
Middleweight (−90 kg)	Alexander Knauf (USA)	Noah Walliss (NZL)	Chen Peng-yu (TPE)
Middleweight (−90 kg)	Alexander Knauf (USA)	Noah Walliss (NZL)	Danny Vojnikovich (AUS)
Half-heavyweight (−100 kg)	Oliver Barratt (GBR)	Chino Sy (PHI)	Axel Nightingale (AUS)
Half-heavyweight (−100 kg)	Oliver Barratt (GBR)	Chino Sy (PHI)	Jack Rigby (AUS)
Heavyweight (+100 kg)	Martti Puumalainen (FIN)	Kayhan Ozcicek-Takagi (AUS)	Akira Nakajima (UGA)
Heavyweight (+100 kg)	Martti Puumalainen (FIN)	Kayhan Ozcicek-Takagi (AUS)	Philip Horiuchi (USA)

=== Women's events ===
Event	Gold	Silver	Bronze
Extra-lightweight (−48 kg)	Lin Chen-hao (TPE)	Maria Celia Laborde (USA)	Chiu Chi-jou (TPE)
Extra-lightweight (−48 kg)	Lin Chen-hao (TPE)	Maria Celia Laborde (USA)	Lok Yi-ho (HKG)
Half-lightweight (−52 kg)	Shraddha Kadubal Chopade (IND)	Tsui Shuk-ki (HKG)	Ria Kney (NZL)
Half-lightweight (−52 kg)	Shraddha Kadubal Chopade (IND)	Tsui Shuk-ki (HKG)	Maelie Tournier (AUS)
Lightweight (−57 kg)	Ana Viktorija Puljiz (CRO)	Pihla Matikainen (FIN)	Dora Bortas (CRO)
Lightweight (−57 kg)	Ana Viktorija Puljiz (CRO)	Pihla Matikainen (FIN)	Mariah Holguin (USA)
Half-middleweight (−63 kg)	Iva Oberan (CRO)	Katarina Krišto (CRO)	Emily Daniela Jaspe (USA)
Half-middleweight (−63 kg)	Iva Oberan (CRO)	Katarina Krišto (CRO)	Karlee Carrouth (USA)
Middleweight (−70 kg)	Aoife Coughlan (AUS)	Liao Yu-jung (TPE)	Rachael Hawkes (GBR)
Middleweight (−70 kg)	Aoife Coughlan (AUS)	Liao Yu-jung (TPE)	Moira de Villiers (NZL)
Half-heavyweight (−78 kg)	Maria Swan (AUS)	Hsu Wang Shu-huei (TPE)	Alannah Joyce (AUS)
Half-heavyweight (−78 kg)	Maria Swan (AUS)	Hsu Wang Shu-huei (TPE)	Wang Chieh-hsi (TPE)
Heavyweight (+78 kg)	Sydnee Andrews (NZL)	Helena Vuković (CRO)	Urszula Hofman (POL)
Heavyweight (+78 kg)	Sydnee Andrews (NZL)	Helena Vuković (CRO)	Chang Ling-fang (TPE)

=== Medal table ===
* Host nation (Australia)

Rank	Nation	Gold	Silver	Bronze	Total
1	Chinese Taipei (TPE)	2	2	6	10
2	Croatia (CRO)	2	2	1	5
3	Finland (FIN)	2	2	0	4
4	Australia (AUS)*	2	1	7	10
5	United States (USA)	1	2	7	10
6	New Zealand (NZL)	1	1	2	4
7	Great Britain (GBR)	1	0	1	2
8	Canada (CAN)	1	0	0	1
8	Cyprus (CYP)	1	0	0	1
8	India (IND)	1	0	0	1
11	Hong Kong (HKG)	0	1	1	2
12	France (FRA)	0	1	0	1
12	Ireland (IRL)	0	1	0	1
12	Philippines (PHI)	0	1	0	1
15	Poland (POL)	0	0	1	1
15	Thailand (THA)	0	0	1	1
15	Uganda (UGA)	0	0	1	1
Totals (17 entries)		14	14	28	56
