= 2026 Oceania Judo Championships =

Judo competition

2026 Judo Oceania Judo Championships
- Location: Melbourne, Australia
- Date: 19 April 2026
- No. of events: 15 (7 men, 7 women, 1 mixed)

Competition at external databases
- Links: IJF • JudoInside

The 2026 Oceania Judo Championships was an edition of the Oceania Judo Championships, organised by the Oceania Judo Union. It was held in Melbourne, Australia on 19 April 2026.

== Medal summary ==
=== Men's events ===
Event	Gold	Silver	Bronze
Extra-lightweight (−60 kg)	Pedro Antun Neto (AUS)	Lukas Chene (PYF)	Hayden Brosius (NZL)
Extra-lightweight (−60 kg)	Pedro Antun Neto (AUS)	Lukas Chene (PYF)	Gensric Sakiman (NCL)
Half-lightweight (−66 kg)	Vas Middleton (AUS)	Timeo Tournier (AUS)	Dylan Payne (NZL)
Half-lightweight (−66 kg)	Vas Middleton (AUS)	Timeo Tournier (AUS)	Tatalong Hannarong (NZL)
Lightweight (−73 kg)	Kohsei Toyoshima (AUS)	Joel Robinson (NZL)	Kerian Vasapolli (PYF)
Half-middleweight (−81 kg)	Keishin Ochi (AUS)	Vincent Burani (NCL)	Toanui Lucas (PYF)
Middleweight (−90 kg)	Danny Vojnikovich (AUS)	Noah Walliss (NZL)	Elliott Connolly (NZL)
Half-heavyweight (−100 kg)	Axel Nightingale (AUS)	Jack Rigby (AUS)	Matthew Rowley (NZL)
Half-heavyweight (−100 kg)	Axel Nightingale (AUS)	Jack Rigby (AUS)	Jérémy Picard (PYF)
Heavyweight (+100 kg)	Kayhan Ozcicek-Takagi (AUS)	Gerard Takayawa (FIJ)	Kody Andrews (NZL)
Heavyweight (+100 kg)	Kayhan Ozcicek-Takagi (AUS)	Gerard Takayawa (FIJ)	Paula Monta (TGA)

=== Women's events ===
Event	Gold	Silver	Bronze
Extra-lightweight (−48 kg)	Abbey Cook (AUS)	—	—
Half-lightweight (−52 kg)	Tinka Easton (AUS)	Ria Kney (NZL)	—
Lightweight (−57 kg)	Lisa Caravello (AUS)	Oren Kelly (AUS)	Siobhan Voyce (NZL)
Lightweight (−57 kg)	Lisa Caravello (AUS)	Oren Kelly (AUS)	Roberta Griffiths (NZL)
Half-middleweight (−63 kg)	Maeve Coughlan (AUS)	Teraimatuatini Bopp (PYF)	Saya Middleton (AUS)
Half-middleweight (−63 kg)	Maeve Coughlan (AUS)	Teraimatuatini Bopp (PYF)	Qona Christie (NZL)
Middleweight (−70 kg)	Aoife Coughlan (AUS)	Moira de Villiers (NZL)	Ella Kelso (NZL)
Middleweight (−70 kg)	Aoife Coughlan (AUS)	Moira de Villiers (NZL)	Nathalyn Takayawa (FIJ)
Half-heavyweight (−78 kg)	Maria Swan (AUS)	Hannah Bradbury (AUS)	Ashley Suta Dit Saponia (NCL)
Heavyweight (+78 kg)	Rauhiti Vernaudon (PYF)	—	—

Source results:

=== Mixed events ===
Event	Gold	Silver	Bronze
Mixed team	Australia	New Zealand	French Polynesia

=== Medal table ===
* Host nation (Australia)

Rank	Nation	Gold	Silver	Bronze	Total
1	Australia (AUS)*	14	4	1	19
2	French Polynesia (PYF)	1	2	4	7
3	New Zealand (NZL)	0	5	10	15
4	New Caledonia (NCL)	0	1	2	3
5	Fiji (FIJ)	0	1	1	2
6	Tonga (TGA)	0	0	1	1
7	Guam (GUM)	0	0	0	0
Totals (7 entries)		15	13	19	47
