= 2014 World Judo Championships – Women's 48 kg =

Judo competition

Judo Women's 48 kg at the 2014 World Judo Championships
- Venue: Traktor Ice Arena
- Location: Chelyabinsk, Russia
- Date: 25 August 2014
- Competitors: 34 from 30 nations
- Total prize money: 14,000$

Medalists
gold medal	Ami Kondo (1st title)	Japan
silver medal	Paula Pareto	Argentina
bronze medal	Amandine Buchard	France
bronze medal	Maria Celia Laborde	Cuba

Competition at external databases
- Links: IJF • JudoInside

The women's 48 kg competition of the 2014 World Judo Championships was held on 25 August.

== Medalists ==
Gold	Silver	Bronze
Ami Kondo (JPN)	Paula Pareto (ARG)	Amandine Buchard (FRA); Maria Celia Laborde (CUB)

== Results ==
=== Finals ===
Semi-finals
(Japan) Ami Kondo	100
(Cuba) Maria Laborde	000
(France) Amandine Buchard	000
(Argentina) Paula Pareto	010

Final
(Japan) Ami Kondo	000
(Argentina) Paula Pareto	000

=== Repechage ===
Repechage		Third place
(Russia) Alesya Kuznetsova	100
(Hungary) Éva Csernoviczki	000	(Russia) Alesya Kuznetsova	000
		(France) Amandine Buchard	001

Repechage		Third place
(Ukraine) Maryna Cherniak	000
(Cuba) Dayaris Mestre Álvarez	011	(Cuba) Dayaris Mestre Álvarez	000
		(Cuba) Maria Laborde	101

=== Pool A ===
Quarterfinals		Semifinals		Final
(Mongolia) Mönkhbatyn Urantsetseg	000
(China) Xie Shishi	000	(Mongolia) Mönkhbatyn Urantsetseg	000
(Japan) Ami Kondo	101	(Japan) Ami Kondo	001
(Turkey) Ebru Şahin	000			(Japan) Ami Kondo	100
(Russia) Alesya Kuznetsova	100			(Russia) Alesya Kuznetsova	000
(Algeria) Sabrina Saidi	000	(Russia) Alesya Kuznetsova	011
(Ecuador) Diana Cobos	000	(Spain) Julia Figueroa	010
(Spain) Julia Figueroa	100

=== Pool B ===
First Round
(Romania) Monica Ungureanu	101
(Kazakhstan) Meruyert Imangaliyeva	000

Quarterfinals
(Cuba) Maria Laborde	110
(Kyrgyzstan) Aizaada Zhanalieva	000
(Belarus) Katsiaryna Nakhayenka	000
(North Korea) Kim Sol-mi	011
(Hungary) Éva Csernoviczki	100
(Romania) Monica Ungureanu	000
(Portugal) Leandra Freitas	000
(Mexico) Edna Carrillo	001

Semifinals
(Cuba) Maria Laborde	001
(North Korea) Kim Sol-mi	000
(Hungary) Éva Csernoviczki	100
(Mexico) Edna Carrillo	000

Final
(Cuba) Maria Laborde	000
(Hungary) Éva Csernoviczki	000

=== Pool C ===
Quarterfinals		Semifinals		Final
(Brazil) Sarah Menezes	000
(France) Amandine Buchard	001	(France) Amandine Buchard	100
(Malawi) Harriet Boniface	000	(Zambia) Abigail Chindele	000
(Zambia) Abigail Chindele	100			(France) Amandine Buchard	010
(Ukraine) Maryna Cherniak	100			(Ukraine) Maryna Cherniak	000
(Venezuela) Diana Ortiz	000	(Ukraine) Maryna Cherniak	100
(Nepal) Lila Adhikari	000	(Uzbekistan) Mukaddas Kubeeva	000
(Uzbekistan) Mukaddas Kubeeva	100

=== Pool D ===
First Round
(Mongolia) Galbadrakh Otgontsetseg	010
(Russia) Irina Dolgova	000

Quarterfinals
(Guinea-Bissau) Taciana Lima	000
(Argentina) Paula Pareto	010
(Poland) Ewa Konieczny	000
(Turkey) Sümeyye Akkuş	000
(Italy) Valentina Moscatt	100
(Madagascar) Asaramanitra Ratiarison	000
(Mongolia) Galbadrakh Otgontsetseg	000
(Cuba) Dayaris Mestre Álvarez	011

Semifinals
(Argentina) Paula Pareto	000
(Poland) Ewa Konieczny	000
(Italy) Valentina Moscatt	000
(Cuba) Dayaris Mestre Álvarez	000

Final
(Argentina) Paula Pareto	001
(Cuba) Dayaris Mestre Álvarez	000

== Prize money ==
The sums listed bring the total prizes awarded to 14,000$ for the individual event.

Medal	Total	Judoka	Coach
Gold	6,000$	4,800$	1,200$
Silver	4,000$	3,200$	800$
Bronze	2,000$	1,600$	400$
