= 2020 in combat sports =

== Boxing ==
=== 2020 Summer Olympics (Boxing) ===
- February 20 – 29: Olympic Qualifying Tournament – Africa in (Senegal) Dakar
- March 3 – 11: Olympic Qualifying Tournament – Asia & Oceania in (Jordan) Amman (Note: Originally scheduled to be held in Wuhan, China from February 3–14, 2020 but was cancelled by local organizers amidst concerns over the COVID-19 pandemic which believed to originate from the city. The qualifiers were moved to Amman, Jordan.)
- March 13 – 23: Olympic Qualifying Tournament – Europe in (United Kingdom) London
- March 26 – April 3: Olympic Qualifying Tournament – Americas in (Argentina) Buenos Aires
- May 13 – 24: World Olympic Qualifying Tournament in (France) Paris

=== International boxing events ===
- October 10 – 15: 2020 World University Boxing Championships in (Poland) Katowice

== Fencing ==
=== International fencing events ===
- February 22 – 29: 2020 Pan American Junior Fencing Championships in (El Salvador) San Salvador
- February 22 – March 3: 2020 European Junior Fencing Championships in (Croatia) Poreč
- February 24 – 29: 2020 African Junior Fencing Championships in Ghana (location TBA)
- February 25 – March 5: 2020 Asian Junior Fencing Championships in (Indonesia) Jakarta
- April 3 – 11: 2020 World Junior & Cadet Fencing Championships in (United States) Salt Lake City
- April 17 – 22: 2020 Asian Fencing Championships in (South Korea) Seoul
- April 19 – 24: 2020 African Fencing Championships in (Egypt) Cairo
- June 16 – 21: 2020 Pan American Fencing Championships in (Paraguay) Asunción
- June 16 – 21: 2020 European Fencing Championships in (Belarus) Minsk

=== 2019–20 Fencing Grand Prix ===
- Épée Grand Prix
  - January 24 – 26: Qatari Grand Prix in (Qatar) Doha
  - March 6 – 8: Hungarian Grand Prix in (Hungary) Budapest
  - May 1 – 3: Colombian Grand Prix (final) in (Colombia) Cali
- Foil Grand Prix
  - February 7 – 9: Italian Grand Prix in (Italy) Turin
  - March 13 – 15: American Grand Prix in (United States) Anaheim
  - May 15 – 17: Chinese Grand Prix (final) in (China) Shanghai
- Sabre Grand Prix
  - January 10 – 12: Canadian Grand Prix in (Canada) Montreal
  - April 26 – 28: Korean Grand Prix in (South Korea) Seoul
  - May 24 – 26: Russian Grand Prix (final) in (Russia) Moscow

=== 2019–20 Fencing World Cup ===
- Men's Épée World Cup
  - November 22 – 24, 2019: Swiss World Cup in (Switzerland) Bern
    - Winner: (Ukraine) Ihor Reizlin
    - Team winners: France
  - January 9 – 11: German Men's Épée World Cup in (Germany) Heidenheim an der Brenz
  - February 7 – 9: Canadian World Cup in (Canada) Vancouver
  - March 20 – 22: Argentinian World Cup in (Argentina) Buenos Aires
  - May 15 – 17: French Men's Épée World Cup (final) in (France) Paris
- Women's Épée World Cup
  - November 1 – 3, 2019: Estonian World Cup in (Estonia) Tallinn
    - Winner: (Romania) Ana Maria Popescu
    - Team winners: Poland
  - January 10 – 12: Cuban World Cup in (Cuba) Havana
  - February 7 – 9: Spanish Women's Épée World Cup in (Spain) Barcelona
  - March 20 – 22: Chinese World Cup in (China) Chengdu
  - May 15 – 17: Emirati World Cup (final) in (United Arab Emirates) Dubai
- Men's Foil World Cup
  - November 8 – 10, 2019: German Men's Foil World Cup in (Germany) Bonn
    - Winner: (France) Julien Mertine
    - Team winners: United States
  - December 13 – 15, 2019: Japanese World Cup (Olympic Test Event) in (Japan) Tokyo
    - Winner: (Italy) Alessio Foconi
    - Team winners: France
  - January 10 – 12: French Men's Foil World Cup in (France) Paris
  - February 21 – 23: Egyptian Men's Foil World Cup in (Egypt) Cairo
  - May 1 – 3: Russian World Cup (final) in (Russia) Saint Petersburg
- Women's Foil World Cup
  - November 22 – 24, 2019: Egyptian Women's Foil World Cup in (Egypt) Cairo
    - Winner: (Italy) Arianna Errigo
    - Team winners: Italy
  - December 13 – 15, 2019: French Women's Foil World Cup in (France) Saint-Maur-des-Fossés
    - Winner: (Italy) Alice Volpi
    - Team winners: Russia
  - January 10 – 12: Polish Women's Foil World Cup in (Poland) Katowice
  - February 21 – 23: (TBA)
  - May 1 – 3: German Women's Foil World Cup (final) in (Germany) Tauberbischofsheim
- Men's Sabre World Cup
  - November 15 – 17, 2019: Egyptian Men's Sabre World Cup in (Egypt) Cairo
    - Winner: (France) Vincent Anstett
    - Team winners: South Korea
  - February 21 – 23: Polish Men's Sabre World Cup in (Poland) Warsaw
  - March 6 – 8: Italian World Cup in (Italy) Padua
  - March 20 – 22: Hungarian World Cup in (Hungary) Budapest
  - May 8 – 10: Spanish Men's Sabre World Cup (final) in (Spain) Madrid
- Women's Sabre World Cup
  - November 22 – 24, 2019: French Women's Sabre World Cup in (France) Orléans
    - Winner: (France) Manon Brunet
    - Team winners: Russia
  - December 13 – 15, 2019: American World Cup in (United States) Salt Lake City
    - Winner: (Ukraine) Olha Kharlan
    - Team winners: Russia
  - March 6 – 8: Greek World Cup in (Greece) Athens
  - March 20 – 22: Belgian World Cup in (Belgium) Sint-Niklaas
  - May 8 – 10: Tunisian World Cup (final) in (Tunisia) Tunis

== Judo ==
=== 2020 World and continental judo events ===
- April 16 – 19: 2020 African Judo Championships in (Morocco) Casablanca
- ~~April 17 – 19: 2020 Asian-Pacific Judo Championships (Senior & Team) in (Mongolia) Ulaanbaatar~~
- April 17 – 19: 2020 Pan American Judo Championships in (Canada) Montreal
- May 1 – 3: 2020 European Judo Championships in (Czech Republic) Prague

=== 2020 Judo Grand Slam ===
- February 8 & 9: JGS #1 in (France) Paris
- February 21 – 23: JGS #2 in (Germany) Düsseldorf
- October 23–25: JGS #3 in (Hungary) Budapest

=== 2020 Judo Grand Prix ===
- January 23 – 25: JUGP #1 in (Israel) Tel Aviv

=== 2020 Asian Open ===
- July 4 & 5: AsJO #1 in (Kazakhstan) Aktau
- August 29 & 30: AsJO #2 in (Chinese Taipei) Taipei
- September 5 & 6: AsJO #3 (final) in (Hong Kong) Kowloon

=== 2020 European Open ===
- February 1 & 2: EJO #1 in (Bulgaria) Sofia (Men) & (Portugal) Odivelas (Women)
- February 15 & 16: EJO #2 in (Austria) Oberwart (Men) & (Slovakia) Bratislava (Women)
- February 29 & March 1: EJO #3 in (Poland) Warsaw

=== 2020 European Cup ===
- March 7 & 8: EJC #1 in (Switzerland) Zürich
- March 21 & 22: EJC #2 in (Bosnia and Herzegovina) Sarajevo
- June 20 & 21: EJC #4 in (Slovenia) Celje-Podčetrtek
- October 3 & 4: EJC #7 (final) in (Croatia) Dubrovnik

=== 2020 Pan American Open ===
- March 7 & 8: PAJO #1 in (Argentina) Bariloche
- March 14 & 15: PAJO #2 in (Chile) Santiago
- March 21 & 22: PAJO #3 in (Peru) Lima
- June 20 & 21: PAJO #4 in (Ecuador) Guayaquil
- September 5 & 6: PAJO #5 (final) in (Dominican Republic) Santo Domingo

=== 2020 African Open ===
- November 7 & 8: AJO #1 in (Cameroon) Yaoundé
- November 14 & 15: AJO #2 (final) in (Senegal) Dakar

== Karate ==
=== International karate events ===
- February 7 – 9: 2020 EKF Junior, Cadet, & U21 Karate Championships in (Hungary) Budapest
- February 7 – 9: 2020 UFAK Junior & Senior Karate Championships in (Morocco) Tangier
- March 25 – 29: 2020 European Karate Championships in (Azerbaijan) Baku
- April 3 – 5: 2020 Mediterranean Karate Championships in (Cyprus) Nicosia
- May 25 – 30: 2020 PKF Karate Championships in (Costa Rica) San José
- June 12 & 13: 2020 OKF Junior & Senior Karate Championships in New Caledonia (location TBA)
- June 29 – July 2: 2020 WKF Youth Camp in (Croatia) Poreč
- July 10 – 12: 2020 AKF Junior, Cadet, & U21 Karate Championships in Kuwait City
- August 24 – 29: 2020 PKF Junior, Cadet, & U21 Karate Championships in (Mexico) Monterrey
- September 4 – 6: 2020 Asian Karate Championships in (Indonesia) Bali
- November 5 – 8: 2020 World University Karate Championships in (Brazil) Brasília
- November 17 – 22: 2020 World Karate Championships in (United Arab Emirates) Dubai

=== 2020 Karate 1 – Premier League ===
- January 24 – 26: K1PL #1 in (France) Paris
- February 14 – 16: K1PL #2 in (United Arab Emirates) Dubai
- February 28 – March 1: K1PL #3 in (Austria) Salzburg
- March 13 – 15: K1PL #4 in (Morocco) Rabat
- April 17 – 19: K1PL #5 in (Spain) Madrid
- October 2 – 4: K1PL #6 (final) in (Russia) Moscow

=== 2020 Karate 1 – Series A ===
- January 10 – 12: K1SA #1 in (Chile) Santiago
- June 19 – 21: K1SA #2 in (Turkey) Istanbul
- September 11 – 13: K1SA #3 (final) in (South Africa) Durban

=== 2020 Karate 1 – Youth League ===
- May 1 – 3: K1YL #1 in (Cyprus) Limassol
- July 3 – 5: K1YL #2 in (Croatia) Poreč
- September 25 – 27: K1YL #3 in (Mexico) Monterrey
- December 4 – 6: K1YL #4 (final) in (Italy) Venice

== Mixed Martial Arts ==
=== UFC ===
The UFC promotional company held a total of 41 events in 2020, with 5 being cancelled altogether. 11 of these events were pay-per-view events for championships which held 19 title fights. Due to the coronavirus pandemic, it held the record of the lowest in person attendance since the inception of the UFC.

=== Bellator ===
In 2020 Bellator held a total of 18 events out of their planned 24, due to 6 events being cancelled.

== Taekwondo ==
=== 2020 Summer Olympics (Taekwondo) ===
- February 22 & 23: African Olympic Qualifier for Tokyo 2020 in (Morocco) Rabat
- February 29: Oceania Olympic Qualifier for Tokyo 2020 in (Australia) Gold Coast
- March 11 & 12: Pan American Olympic Qualifier for Tokyo 2020 in (Costa Rica) San José
- April 10 & 11: Asian Olympic Qualifier for Tokyo 2020 in (China) Wuxi
- April 24 & 25: European Olympic Qualifier for Tokyo 2020 in (Italy) Milan

=== International Taekwondo championships ===
- February 7 – 9: 2020 El Hassan Cup in (Jordan) Amman
- February 18 – 21: 2020 President's Cup - European Region in (Sweden) Helsingborg
- October 14 – 18: 2020 World Junior Taekwondo Championships in (Bulgaria) Sofia

=== 2020 Open tournaments ===
- January 31 – February 2: Fujairah Open in the United Arab Emirates
- February 3 – 5: Turkish Open in (Turkey) Istanbul
- February 6 – 8: Mexico Open in Puerto Vallarta
- February 22 & 23: Helsingborg Open in Sweden
- February 22 & 23: Slovenia Open in Ljubljana
- February 29 & March 1: German Open in (Germany) Hamburg

== Wrestling ==
=== 2020 Wrestling Continental Championships ===
- 2020 Individual Wrestling World Cup in (Serbia) Belgrade ⇒ 12–18 December
- 2020 European Wrestling Championships in (Italy) Rome ⇒ 10–16 February
- 2020 Asian Wrestling Championships in (India) New Delhi ⇒ 18–23 February
- 2020 Pan American Wrestling Championships in (Canada) Ottawa ⇒ 6–9 March
- 2020 African Wrestling Championships in (Algeria) Algiers ⇒ 8–9 February
- 2020 Pan American Wrestling Olympic Qualification Tournament in (Canada) Ottawa ⇒ 13–15 March

=== 2020 Wrestling International Tournament ===
- 2020 Yasar Dogu Tournament in (Turkey) Istanbul ⇒ 10–12 January
- Golden Grand Prix Ivan Yarygin 2020 in (Russia) Krasnoyarsk ⇒ 23–26 January
- 2020 Grand Prix Zagreb Open in (Croatia) Zagreb ⇒ 7–8 November
- 2020 Wladyslaw Pytlasinski Cup in (Poland) Warsaw ⇒ 7–8 November

== Wushu ==
- TBA: 2020 World Junior Wushu Championships in Morocco (location TBA)
- TBA: 2020 Taolu World Cup in Japan (location TBA)
- TBA: 2020 Sanda World Cup in China (location TBA)
- TBA: 2020 World Taijiquan Championships in Italy (location TBA)
