= Kody Andrews =

New Zealand judoka

Personal information
- Born: 12 June 2000 (age 26) Christchurch, New Zealand
- Occupation: Judoka
- Height: 1.94 m (6 ft 4 in)
- Weight: 108 kg (238 lb)

Sport
- Country: New Zealand
- Sport: Judo
- Weight class: +100 kg
- Club: Premiere Equipe Judo Club

Achievements and titles
- World Champ.: R32 (2022)
- Oceania Champ.: (bronze) (2026)
- Commonwealth Games: (silver) (2022)
Medal record
Men's judo
Representing New Zealand
Oceania Championships
Bronze medal – third place	2026 Melbourne	+100 kg
Commonwealth Games
Silver medal – second place	2022 Birmingham	+100 kg
Bronze medal – third place	2026 Glasgow	+100 kg

Profile at external databases
- IJF: 56931
- JudoInside.com: 129136
- Updated on 3 August 2026

Kody Andrews (born 12 June 2000) is a New Zealand judoka, who won the silver medal in the over-100 kg category representing his country at the 2022 Commonwealth Games.

== Biography ==
Andrews was born on 12 June 2000 in Christchurch, where he is a member of the Premiere Equipe Judo Club. He was runner-up in the under-90 kg class at the 2018 New Zealand national judo championships. The following year, he moved up to the under-100 kg category, and again finished in second place. He first competed overseas at the 2019 Oceania Open under-21 tournament in Perth, Australia, where he won the under-100 kg event.

In 2022, in the lead-up to the Commonwealth Games, Andrews trained and competed overseas. He placed seventh in the over-100 kg class in World Cup events at both the Tunis Open and Algiers Open in March, and was also seventh in the same class at the 2022 Pan American-Oceania Judo Championships in Lima the following month. He then finished in second place in the over-100 kg class at the European Cup event at Winterthur in July, before winning the silver medal in the same division at the 2022 Commonwealth Games.
