= 2024 World Judo Championships – Women's 57 kg =

Judo competition

Judo Women's 57 kg at the 2024 World Judo Championships
- Venue: Mubadala Arena
- Location: Abu Dhabi, United Arab Emirates
- Date: 20 May 2024
- Competitors: 41 from 35 nations
- Total prize money: €57,000

Medalists
gold medal	Huh Mi-mi (1st title)	South Korea
silver medal	Christa Deguchi	Canada
bronze medal	Jessica Klimkait	Canada
bronze medal	Momo Tamaoki	Japan

Competition at external databases
- Links: IJF • JudoInside

The Women's 57 kg event at the 2024 World Judo Championships was held at the Mubadala Arena in Abu Dhabi, United Arab Emirates on 20 May 2024.

== Results ==
=== Finals ===
Semi-finals
(Canada) Christa Deguchi	01
(Japan) Momo Tamaoki	00
(Canada) Jessica Klimkait	00
(South Korea) Huh Mi-mi	01

Final
(Canada) Christa Deguchi	00
(South Korea) Huh Mi-mi	10

=== Repechage ===
Repechage
(Israel) Timna Nelson-Levy	10 (yellow card)
(Mongolia) Mönkhtsedeviin Ichinkhorloo	00 (yellow card)
(Mongolia) Lkhagvatogoogiin Enkhriilen	10 (yellow card)
(Uzbekistan) Shukurjon Aminova	00

Bronze medal
(Israel) Timna Nelson-Levy	00
(Canada) Jessica Klimkait	01 (yellow card)
(Mongolia) Lkhagvatogoogiin Enkhriilen	00
(Japan) Momo Tamaoki	10

=== Pool A ===
First round
(Germany) Seija Ballhaus	10
(Turkey) Özlem Yıldız	00
(United Kingdom) Lele Nairne	02
(Croatia) Tihea Topolovec	01
(Argentina) Brisa Gómez	00
(Georgia (country)) Nino Loladze	02

Round of 32
(Canada) Christa Deguchi	10
(Belgium) Mina Libeer	00
(Germany) Seija Ballhaus	00 (yellow card)
(Guinea) Mariana Esteves	01
(Israel) Timna Nelson-Levy	11 (yellow card)
(United Kingdom) Lele Nairne	01
(Georgia (country)) Nino Loladze	00 (yellow card)
(Bulgaria) Ivelina Ilieva	02

Round of 16
(Canada) Christa Deguchi	02
(Guinea) Mariana Esteves	00
(Israel) Timna Nelson-Levy	10 (yellow card)
(Bulgaria) Ivelina Ilieva	00

Quarter-finals
(Canada) Christa Deguchi	02
(Israel) Timna Nelson-Levy	00

=== Pool B ===
First round
(India) Yamini Mourya	00
(Mongolia) Mönkhtsedeviin Ichinkhorloo	10 (yellow card)
(Turkmenistan) Maýsa Pardaýewa	00
(Japan) Momo Tamaoki	10

Round of 32
(Serbia) Marica Perišić	11
(United Arab Emirates) Altantsetseg Batsukh	00
(Mongolia) Mönkhtsedeviin Ichinkhorloo	11
(South Africa) Jasmine Martin	00
(Italy) Veronica Toniolo	00 (yellow card)
(Japan) Momo Tamaoki	01
(Panama) Kristine Jiménez	10
(France) Faïza Mokdar	00

Round of 16
(Serbia) Marica Perišić	00 (yellow card)
(Mongolia) Mönkhtsedeviin Ichinkhorloo	01 (yellow card)
(Japan) Momo Tamaoki	02
(Panama) Kristine Jiménez	00

Quarter-finals
(Mongolia) Mönkhtsedeviin Ichinkhorloo	00 (yellow card)
(Japan) Momo Tamaoki	10

=== Pool C ===
First round
(Finland) Pihla Salonen	00
(Netherlands) Julie Beurskens	01 (yellow card)
(Mongolia) Lkhagvatogoogiin Enkhriilen	02
(Austria) Laura Kallinger	00

Round of 32
(Canada) Jessica Klimkait	01
(Netherlands) Julie Beurskens	00
(China) Cai Qi	00
(Poland) Arleta Podolak	10
(Germany) Pauline Starke	00 (yellow card)
(Mongolia) Lkhagvatogoogiin Enkhriilen	10
(France) Priscilla Gneto	10
(United States) Mariah Holguin	00

Round of 16
(Canada) Jessica Klimkait	11 (yellow card)
(Poland) Arleta Podolak	00
(Mongolia) Lkhagvatogoogiin Enkhriilen	11 (yellow card)
(France) Priscilla Gneto	00

Quarter-finals
(Canada) Jessica Klimkait	10 (yellow card)
(Mongolia) Lkhagvatogoogiin Enkhriilen	00

=== Pool D ===
First round
(Azerbaijan) Acelya Toprak	10
(Kazakhstan) Bakyt Kussakbayeva	00
(Chinese Taipei) Lien Chen-ling	00
(Uzbekistan) Shukurjon Aminova	10

Round of 32
(South Korea) Huh Mi-mi	02 (yellow card)
Daria Kurbonmamadova	00
(Azerbaijan) Acelya Toprak	10
(Portugal) Telma Monteiro	00
(Brazil) Jéssica Lima	01 (yellow card)
(Turkey) Hasret Bozkurt	02 (yellow card)
(Uzbekistan) Shukurjon Aminova	10
(United Kingdom) Nekoda Smythe-Davis	00

Round of 16
(South Korea) Huh Mi-mi	10
(Azerbaijan) Acelya Toprak	00 (yellow card)
(Turkey) Hasret Bozkurt	00
(Uzbekistan) Shukurjon Aminova	01 (yellow card)

Quarter-finals
(South Korea) Huh Mi-mi	02
(Uzbekistan) Shukurjon Aminova	00

== Prize money ==
The sums listed bring the total prizes awarded to €57,000 for the individual event.

Medal	Total	Judoka	Coach
Gold	€26,000	€20,800	€5,200
Silver	€15,000	€12,000	€3,000
Bronze	€8,000	€6,400	€1,600
