= Kelly Petersen Pollard =

British judoka (born 1999)

Personal information
- Born: 30 April 1999 (age 27) Birmingham, England
- Occupation: Judoka
- Height: 165 cm (5 ft 5 in)

Sport
- Sport: Judo
- Weight class: ‍–‍70 kg
- Coached by: Fitzroy Davis

Achievements and titles
- World Champ.: R16 (2024, 2026)
- European Champ.: 7th (2022)
- Commonwealth Games: (gold) (2026)
Medal record
Women's judo
Representing Great Britain
IJF Grand Slam
Silver medal – second place	2025 Dushanbe	‍–‍70 kg
Bronze medal – third place	2021 Baku	‍–‍70 kg
Bronze medal – third place	2021 Abu Dhabi	‍–‍70 kg
Bronze medal – third place	2022 Tel Aviv	‍–‍70 kg
Bronze medal – third place	2024 Dushanbe	‍–‍70 kg
IJF Grand Prix
Silver medal – second place	2021 Zagreb	‍–‍70 kg
Silver medal – second place	2023 Linz	‍–‍70 kg
Bronze medal – third place	2023 Dushanbe	‍–‍70 kg
European Junior Championships
Gold medal – first place	2019 Vantaa	‍–‍70 kg
Representing England
Commonwealth Games
Gold medal – first place	2026 Glasgow	‍–‍70 kg
Bronze medal – third place	2022 Birmingham	‍–‍70 kg

Profile at external databases
- IJF: 30500
- JudoInside.com: 90707
- Updated on 8 October 2026

Kelly Petersen Pollard (born 30 April 1999) is a British judoka.

== Judo career ==
Petersen Pollard won her first three three British middleweight titles at the British Judo Championships in 2018, 2019 and 2021.

She is the bronze medallist of the 2021 Judo Grand Slam Baku in the -70 kg category. At the 2021 Judo Grand Slam Abu Dhabi held in Abu Dhabi, United Arab Emirates, she won one of the bronze medals in her event.

She won one of the bronze medals in her event at the 2022 Judo Grand Slam Tel Aviv held in Tel Aviv, Israel.

In the December of 2024 and 2025, she won her 4th and 5th British middleweight title respectively, at the British Judo Championships.

At the 2026 Commonwealth Games, she won the gold medal in ‍–‍70 kg division, defeating Australia's Aoife Coughlan in the final.
