= Ineti Felemi =

Algerian judoka

Personal information
- Nationality: Tongan
- Born: 28 October 1999 (age 26)

Sport
- Country: Tonga
- Sport: Judo
- Event: Women's 95+ kg

Ineti Felemi (born 28 October 1999) is a Tongan judoka.

== Career ==
Felemi won a gold medal in the 2017 Senior Oceania Championships after defeating Fugalaau Mafi by ippon. She won a silver medal in the 2017 Junior Oceania Championships losing to Fugalaau Mafi.
