= Judo at the 2026 Commonwealth Games – Women's 70 kg =

Judo competition

Judo – Women's 70 kg at the 2026 Commonwealth Games
- Venue: SEC Centre, Glasgow
- Date: August 1 2026
- Competitors: 11 from 10 nations

Medalists
gold medal	Kelly Petersen Pollard	England
silver medal	Aoife Coughlan	Australia
bronze medal	Rachael Hawkes	Northern Ireland
bronze medal	Jemima Yeats-Brown	England

The Women's 70 kg judo competitions at the 2026 Commonwealth Games in Glasgow, Scotland will place on August 1 at the SEC Centre. The event will feature eleven judoka from ten nations.

== Seedings ==
The following judoka were seeded in advance of the draw:

Women's 70 kg
Seed	Judoka	Nation
1	Aoife Coughlan	Australia
2	Kelly Petersen Pollard	England
3	Inunganbi Takhellambam	India
4	Moira de Villiers	New Zealand
5	Rachael Hawkes	Northern Ireland
6	Jemima Yeats-Brown	England
7	Charlie Thibault	Canada
8	Holly Devall	Wales

== Results ==
=== Gold final path ===
Round of 16
Holly Devall (WAL)	102
Noemie Evenor (MRI)	000 (yellow card)
Jemima Yeats-Brown (ENG)	102
Mary Njeri (KEN)	000
Charlie Thibault (CAN)	001 (yellow card)
Zubida Talikaza (UGA)	000 (yellow card)

Quarterfinals
Aoife Coughlan (AUS)	101
Holly Devall (WAL)	000 (yellow card)
Moira de Villiers (NZL)	101 (yellow card)
Rachael Hawkes (NIR)	000
Kelly Petersen Pollard (ENG)	101
Jemima Yeats-Brown (ENG)	000
Inunganbi Takhellambam (IND)	000 (yellow card)
Charlie Thibault (CAN)	101 (yellow card)

Semifinal
Aoife Coughlan (AUS)	100
Moira de Villiers (NZL)	000
Kelly Petersen Pollard (ENG)	100
Charlie Thibault (CAN)	000

Gold medal final
Aoife Coughlan (AUS)	000
Kelly Petersen Pollard (ENG)	100

=== Repechage/bronze medal path ===
Competitors who are eliminated by either finalist enter the repechage to contest for the bronze medals.

Repechage
Holly Devall (WAL)	000 (yellow card)
Rachael Hawkes (NIR)	001 (yellow card)
Jemima Yeats-Brown (ENG)	100
Inunganbi Takhellambam (IND)	000 (yellow card)

Bronze medal
Rachael Hawkes (NIR)	100
Charlie Thibault (CAN)	000
Jemima Yeats-Brown (ENG)	100 (yellow card)
Moira de Villiers (NZL)	000
