= Ebony Drysdale Daley =

Jamaican judoka (born 1995)

Personal information
- Nationality: Jamaican
- Born: 21 January 1995 (age 31) Birmingham, United Kingdom
- Occupation: Judoka

Sport
- Country: Great Britain (2014–18); Jamaica (2019–present)
- Sport: Judo
- Weight class: ‍–‍70 kg

Achievements and titles
- Olympic Games: R32 (2020)
- World Champ.: R32 (2021, 2022, 2024)
- Pan American Champ.: 5th (2020)
- Commonwealth Games: (silver) (2022)
Medal record
Women's judo
Representing Great Britain
World Juniors Championships
Silver medal – second place	2014 Fort Lauderdale	‍–‍70 kg
Representing Jamaica
Commonwealth Games
Silver medal – second place	2022 Birmingham	‍–‍70 kg

Profile at external databases
- IJF: 48362, 17176
- JudoInside.com: 66150
- Updated on 22 May 2024

Ebony Drysdale Daley (born 21 January 1995) is a British-born Jamaican judoka who competes in the women's 70 kg class. She was the first judoka from Jamaica to qualify for the Summer Olympic Games.

== Personal life ==
Born in Birmingham, United Kingdom, Daley has dual British and Jamaican heritage, with her father being a first-generation British citizen and her mother a second-generation British citizen. Her father was born in Jamaica. Daley previously competed for Great Britain, earning a silver medal at the Junior World Championships in 2014. She has been representing Jamaica since 2019. Her brother, Nicholi, has also competed in judo for Jamaica. Drysdale Daley attended the University of Wolverhampton.

== Career ==
She competed at the 2019 Commonwealth Games Judo Championships, 2019 World Judo Championships, and 2020 Panamerican Senior Championships.

She qualified for the 2020 Summer Olympics, becoming her country’s first-ever competitor in the sport to qualify for the Olympic Games. She competed in the women's 70 kg event. She attempted to qualify for the 2024 Summer Olympics, however she was blocked from qualifying by the Jamaican Judo Association which they claimed were on the grounds of Drysdale Daly missing anti-doping deadlines. She accused them of favouring the male judoka Ashley McKenzie and the Jamaica Olympic Association of ignoring her emails, but she was banned for a year by the Jamaican Judo Association. She appealed and the suspension was lifted on the grounds that the Judo Association failed to follow correct procedures.
