= Lele Nairne =

British judoka (born 1997)

Personal information
- Nationality: British (English)
- Born: 29 September 1997 (age 28) Weston-super-Mare, Somerset, England
- Occupation: Judoka
- Website: lelenairnejudo.com

Sport
- Country: Great Britain
- Sport: Judo
- Weight class: ‍–‍57 kg
- Club: Bradley Stoke

Achievements and titles
- Olympic Games: R32 (2024)
- World Champ.: R32 (2019, 2024)
- European Champ.: R32 (2023, 2024)
- Commonwealth Games: (bronze) (2026)
Medal record
Women's judo
Representing Great Britain
IJF Grand Prix
Gold medal – first place	2022 Perth	‍–‍57 kg
European U23 Championships
Silver medal – second place	2018 Győr	‍–‍57 kg
Representing England
Commonwealth Games
Bronze medal – third place	2026 Glasgow	‍–‍57 kg

Profile at external databases
- IJF: 20991
- JudoInside.com: 84273
- Updated on 1 August 2026

Lele Nairne (born 29 September 1997) is an English international judoka. She has represented England at the Commonwealth Games.

== Biography ==
Nairne won the 2018 European U23 silver. In 2022, she was selected for the 2022 Commonwealth Games in Birmingham as a replacement for the injured Lucy Renshall. She competed in the women's -57 kg category, reaching the semi-finals and just missing out on a medal after losing in the repechage bronze medal match.

In 2023, she won the -57 kg title at the British Judo Championships.

== Personal life ==
Her brother Ethan Nairne is also an international judoka with the pair later training at the Bradley Stoke Judo Club in Bristol, under coach Pete Douglas.
