= 2018 Oceania Judo Championships =

Judo competition

Judo 2018 Oceania Judo Championships
- Venue: Salle omnisport de l'Anse Vata
- Location: Nouméa, New Caledonia
- Dates: 6–8 April 2018
- Competitors: 59 from 11 nations

Competition at external databases
- Links: IJF • JudoInside

The 2018 Oceania Judo Championships was not the ninth but the thirty second edition of the Oceania Judo Championships, organised by the Oceania Judo Union. It took place in Nouméa, New Caledonia from 6–8 April 2018.

== Medal overview ==
=== Men ===
Event	Gold	Silver	Bronze
−60 kg	Joshua Katz (AUS)	Gensric Sakiman (NCL)	Sam Entwistle (NZL)
−66 kg	Kyle Mcindoe (AUS)	James Entwistle (NZL)	Rexly Theuil (VAN)
−73 kg	Calvin Knoester (AUS)	Kinsley Vui (PNG)	Gaston Lafon (PYF); Laurent Taimourlank (NCL)
−81 kg	Eoin Coughlan (AUS)	Anthony Kouros (AUS)	Elliott Connolly (NZL); Joshter Andrew (GUM)
−90 kg	Sebastian Temesi (AUS)	Teva Gouriou (NCL)	Tanguy La Pointe (NCL); Ockert Steyn (NZL)
−100 kg	Tevita Takayawa (FIJ)	David Put (NCL)	Jason Koster (NZL)
+100 kg	Liam Park (AUS)	Derek Sua (SAM)	none awarded

=== Women ===
Event	Gold	Silver	Bronze
−48 kg	Caroline Hain (AUS)	Emma Rouse (NZL)	none awarded
−57 kg	Qona Christie (NZL)	Florence Daoleuang (VAN)	Justine Bishop (NZL)
−63 kg	Katharina Haecker (AUS)	Maeve Coughlan (AUS)	Louise Kelly (NZL); Emeline Kaddour (NCL)
−70 kg	Aoife Coughlan (AUS)	Esther Dumons (NCL)	none awarded
−78 kg	Anaïs Gopea (NCL)	Melanie Wallis (AUS)	Aickessa Atuvaha (NCL)

=== Medal table ===
Rank	Nation	Gold	Silver	Bronze	Total
1	Australia (AUS)	9	3	0	12
2	New Caledonia (NCL)	1	4	4	9
3	New Zealand (NZL)	1	2	6	9
4	Fiji (FIJ)	1	0	0	1
5	Vanuatu (VAN)	0	1	1	2
6	Papua New Guinea (PNG)	0	1	0	1
6	Samoa (SAM)	0	1	0	1
8	French Polynesia (PYF)	0	0	1	1
8	Guam (GUM)	0	0	1	1
Totals (9 entries)		12	12	13	37

== Participating nations ==
There was a total of 59 participants from 11 nations.

- Australia (17)
- Fiji (3)
- French Polynesia (1)
- Guam (1)
- Kiribati (1)
- Nauru (4)
- New Caledonia (12)
- New Zealand (13)
- Papua New Guinea (1)
- Samoa (1)
- Vanuatu (5)
