= Vijay Kumar Yadav (judoka) =

Indian judoka (born 1996)

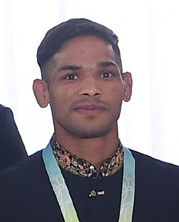
- Yadav in August 2022

Personal information
- Born: 15 April 1996 (age 30)
- Occupation: Judoka
- Height: 1.65 m (5 ft 5 in)

Sport
- Country: India
- Sport: Judo
- Weight class: ‍–‍60 kg

Achievements and titles
- World Champ.: R64 (2017, 2019)
- Asian Champ.: 5th (2017)
- Commonwealth Games: (bronze) (2022)
Medal record
Men's judo
Representing India
Commonwealth Games
Bronze medal – third place	2022 Birmingham	‍–‍60 kg
South Asian Games
Gold medal – first place	2019 Nepal	‍–‍60 kg
Asian Cadet Championships
Silver medal – second place	2012 Taipei	‍–‍60 kg
Bronze medal – third place	2013 Hainan	‍–‍60 kg

Profile at external databases
- IJF: 13175
- JudoInside.com: 90393
- Updated on 6 February 2023

Vijay Kumar Yadav (born 15 April 1996) is an Indian judoka who competes in the 60 kg weight class. He won the bronze medal at the 2022 Commonwealth Games.
