= Malin Wilson =

British judoka (born 1994)

Personal information
- Born: 25 October 1994 (age 31) Scotland
- Occupation: Judoka

Sport
- Country: Great Britain (until 16 February 2024); Spain (since 22 March 2024)
- Sport: Judo
- Weight class: ‍–‍57 kg
- Club: Asociación Judo Móstoles

Achievements and titles
- World Champ.: R32 (2025)
- European Champ.: R32 (2025)
- Commonwealth Games: (bronze) (2022)
Medal record
Women's judo
Representing Scotland
Commonwealth Games
Bronze medal – third place	2022 Birmingham	‍–‍57 kg

Profile at external databases
- IJF: 25918, 82059
- JudoInside.com: 16800
- Updated on 15 June 2025

Malin Wilson (born 25 October 1994) is a Scottish international judoka. She has represented Scotland at the 2022 Commonwealth Games and won a bronze medal.

== Biography ==
Wilson is from Ullapool but lives in Madrid. In 2017, she won silver medals at the Malaga and Dubrovnik European Opens. She became champion of Great Britain, winning the lightweight division at the British Judo Championships in 2018.

In 2022, she was selected for the 2022 Commonwealth Games in Birmingham, where she competed in the women's -57 kg, winning the bronze medal. At the 2022 British National Championships she successfully regained her -57 kg title.
