= Inunganbi Takhellambam =

Indian judoka (born 1999)

Personal information
- Born: 24 January 1999 (age 27)
- Occupation: Judoka

Sport
- Country: India
- Sport: Judo
- Weight class: ‍–‍70 kg

Achievements and titles
- World Champ.: R32 (2026)
- Asian Champ.: (bronze) (2026)
- Commonwealth Games: 7th (2026)
Medal record
Women's judo
Representing India
Asian Championships
Bronze medal – third place	2026 Ordos	‍–‍70 kg

Profile at external databases
- IJF: 40499
- JudoInside.com: 115964
- Updated on 8 October 2026

Inunganbi Takhellambam (born 24 January 1999) is an Indian judoka from Manipur. She competes in the middleweight −70 kg weight class.

== Career ==
In April 2026, Takhellambam won a bronze medal in -70 kg division in the Asian Judo Championships at in Ordos City, the People's Republic of China. She defeated Mongolia's Lkhagvadulam Sarantsetseg by ippon in the bronze medal match. It was the first medal for India in 13 years in the continental championship after the bronze won by Angom Anita Chanu in the women's -52 kg category in 2013 at Bangkok, Thailand.

In August 2025, she won a gold medal in the Amman Asian Open in Jordan.

In 2026, she won a bronze medal at the 2026 Asian Judo Championships in the category.
