= 2014 World Judo Juniors Championships =

Judo competition

Judo 2014 World Judo Juniors Championships
- Location: Fort Lauderdale, United States
- Dates: 22–26 October 2014
- Competitors: 518 from 72 nations

Champions
- Men's team: Japan (1st title)
- Women's team: Japan (2nd title)

Competition at external databases
- Links: IJF • EJU • JudoInside

The 2014 World Judo Juniors Championships was held between 22 and 26 October 2014 in Fort Lauderdale, United States. The final day of competition featured men's and women's team events, both won by team Japan.

== Medal summary ==
=== Men's events ===
| Event | Gold | Silver | Bronze |
|---|---|---|---|
| −55 kg | Umekita Wataru (JPN) | Kamal Fikri (FRA) | Amartuvshin Bayaraa (MGL) |
| −55 kg | Umekita Wataru (JPN) | Kamal Fikri (FRA) | Ganbaatar Battulga (MGL) |
| −60 kg | Francisco Garrigós (ESP) | Tsend-Ochiryn Tsogtbaatar (MGL) | Mehman Sadigov (AZE) |
| −60 kg | Francisco Garrigós (ESP) | Tsend-Ochiryn Tsogtbaatar (MGL) | Choi In-hyuk (KOR) |
| −66 kg | Egor Mgdsyan (RUS) | Hifumi Abe (JPN) | Ricardo Santos Junior (BRA) |
| −66 kg | Egor Mgdsyan (RUS) | Hifumi Abe (JPN) | Baruch Shmailov (ISR) |
| −73 kg | An Chang-rim (KOR) | Yuji Yamamoto (JPN) | Nuno Saraiva (POR) |
| −73 kg | An Chang-rim (KOR) | Yuji Yamamoto (JPN) | Koba Mchedlishvili (GEO) |
| −81 kg | Rafael Macedo (BRA) | Mikhail Igolnikov (RUS) | Levan Gugava (GEO) |
| −81 kg | Rafael Macedo (BRA) | Mikhail Igolnikov (RUS) | Pape Doudou Ndiaye (FRA) |
| −90 kg | Krisztián Tóth (HUN) | Nikoloz Sherazadishvili (ESP) | Max de Vreeze (NED) |
| −90 kg | Krisztián Tóth (HUN) | Nikoloz Sherazadishvili (ESP) | Beka Gviniashvili (GEO) |
| −100 kg | Gotō Ryūtarō (JPN) | Niyaz Ilyasov (RUS) | Ramazan Malsuigenov (RUS) |
| −100 kg | Gotō Ryūtarō (JPN) | Niyaz Ilyasov (RUS) | Aaron Wolf (JPN) |
| +100 kg | Ölziibayaryn Düürenbayar (MGL) | Guga Kibordzalidze (GEO) | Iakiv Khammo (UKR) |
| +100 kg | Ölziibayaryn Düürenbayar (MGL) | Guga Kibordzalidze (GEO) | Ruslan Shakhbazov (RUS) |
| Team | Japan | Georgia | South Korea |
| Team | Japan | Georgia | Russia |

Source Results

=== Women's events ===
| Event | Gold | Silver | Bronze |
|---|---|---|---|
| −44 kg | Sakaguchi Hitomi (JPN) | Larissa Farias (BRA) | Melisa Çakmaklı (TUR) |
| −44 kg | Sakaguchi Hitomi (JPN) | Larissa Farias (BRA) | Olfa Saoudi (TUN) |
| −48 kg | Ami Kondo (JPN) | Dilara Lokmanhekim (TUR) | Alexandra Pop (ROU) |
| −48 kg | Ami Kondo (JPN) | Dilara Lokmanhekim (TUR) | Patrycia Szekely (GER) |
| −52 kg | Amandine Buchard (FRA) | Alexandra-Larisa Florian (ROU) | Astride Gneto (FRA) |
| −52 kg | Amandine Buchard (FRA) | Alexandra-Larisa Florian (ROU) | Mako Uchio (JPN) |
| −57 kg | Momo Tamaoki (JPN) | Christa Deguchi (JPN) | Catherine Beauchemin-Pinard (CAN) |
| −57 kg | Momo Tamaoki (JPN) | Christa Deguchi (JPN) | Daria Kurbonmamadova (RUS) |
| −63 kg | Miho Minei (JPN) | Nami Nabekura (JPN) | Katie-Jemima Yeats-Brown (GBR) |
| −63 kg | Miho Minei (JPN) | Nami Nabekura (JPN) | Vivian Herrmann (GER) |
| −70 kg | Barbara Matić (CRO) | Ebony Drysdale Daley (GBR) | Mélissa Héleine (FRA) |
| −70 kg | Barbara Matić (CRO) | Ebony Drysdale Daley (GBR) | Marie-Ève Gahié (FRA) |
| −78 kg | Sarra Mzougui (TUN) | Sama Hawa Camara (FRA) | Ana Laura Portuondo Isasi (CAN) |
| −78 kg | Sarra Mzougui (TUN) | Sama Hawa Camara (FRA) | Beata Pacut (POL) |
| +78 kg | Sarah Asahina (JPN) | Anastasiia Komovych (UKR) | Marlín Viveros (ECU) |
| +78 kg | Sarah Asahina (JPN) | Anastasiia Komovych (UKR) | Marine Erb (FRA) |
| Team | Japan | France | South Korea |
| Team | Japan | France | Russia |

Source Results

=== Medal table ===
* Host nation (United States)

| Rank | Nation | Gold | Silver | Bronze | Total |
|---|---|---|---|---|---|
| 1 | Japan (JPN) | 7 | 4 | 2 | 13 |
| 2 | France (FRA) | 1 | 2 | 5 | 8 |
| 3 | Russia (RUS) | 1 | 2 | 3 | 6 |
| 4 | Mongolia (MGL) | 1 | 1 | 2 | 4 |
| 5 | Brazil (BRA) | 1 | 1 | 1 | 3 |
| 6 | Spain (ESP) | 1 | 1 | 0 | 2 |
| 7 | South Korea (KOR) | 1 | 0 | 1 | 2 |
| 7 | Tunisia (TUN) | 1 | 0 | 1 | 2 |
| 9 | Croatia (CRO) | 1 | 0 | 0 | 1 |
| 9 | Hungary (HUN) | 1 | 0 | 0 | 1 |
| 11 | Georgia (GEO) | 0 | 1 | 3 | 4 |
| 12 | Great Britain (GBR) | 0 | 1 | 1 | 2 |
| 12 | Romania (ROU) | 0 | 1 | 1 | 2 |
| 12 | Turkey (TUR) | 0 | 1 | 1 | 2 |
| 12 | Ukraine (UKR) | 0 | 1 | 1 | 2 |
| 16 | Canada (CAN) | 0 | 0 | 2 | 2 |
| 16 | Germany (GER) | 0 | 0 | 2 | 2 |
| 18 | Azerbaijan (AZE) | 0 | 0 | 1 | 1 |
| 18 | Ecuador (ECU) | 0 | 0 | 1 | 1 |
| 18 | Israel (ISR) | 0 | 0 | 1 | 1 |
| 18 | Netherlands (NED) | 0 | 0 | 1 | 1 |
| 18 | Poland (POL) | 0 | 0 | 1 | 1 |
| 18 | Portugal (POR) | 0 | 0 | 1 | 1 |
| Totals (23 entries) | | 16 | 16 | 32 | 64 |
