= Moira de Villiers =

New Zealand judoka

Personal information
- Nationality: New Zealander
- Born: 16 March 1990 (age 36) Johannesburg, South Africa
- Occupation: Judoka

Sport
- Country: New Zealand
- Sport: Judo
- Weight class: ‍–‍70 kg, ‍–‍78 kg

Achievements and titles
- Olympic Games: R32 (2012, 2024)
- World Champ.: R16 (2022, 2023)
- Oceania Champ.: (gold) (× 8 times); (silver) (2023)
- Commonwealth Games: (silver) (2014)
Medal record
Women's judo
Representing New Zealand
Pan American-Oceania Championships
Silver medal – second place	2023 Calgary	‍–‍78 kg
Bronze medal – third place	2022 Lima	‍–‍78 kg
Oceania Championships
Gold medal – first place	2008 Christchurch	Open
Gold medal – first place	2010 Canberra	‍–‍70 kg
Gold medal – first place	2011 Papeete	‍–‍70 kg
Gold medal – first place	2012 Cairns	‍–‍70 kg
Gold medal – first place	2013 Apia	‍–‍70 kg
Gold medal – first place	2014 Auckland	‍–‍70 kg
Gold medal – first place	2015 Nouvelle	‍–‍70 kg
Gold medal – first place	2016 Canberra	‍–‍70 kg
Silver medal – second place	2008 Christchurch	‍–‍70 kg
Silver medal – second place	2026 Melbourne	‍–‍70 kg
IJF Grand Prix
Bronze medal – third place	2022 Perth	‍–‍70 kg
Bronze medal – third place	2025 Gold Coast	‍–‍70 kg
Commonwealth Games
Silver medal – second place	2014 Glasgow	‍–‍70 kg
Bronze medal – third place	2022 Birmingham	‍–‍78 kg
Oceania Junior Championships
Gold medal – first place	2006 Papeete	‍–‍70 kg
Gold medal – first place	2008 Christchurch	‍–‍70 kg

Profile at external databases
- IJF: 1331
- JudoInside.com: 43303
- Updated on 30 April 2026

Moira de Villiers (born 16 March 1990), also known by her married name of Koster, is a South African-born New Zealand judoka. She competed in the 70 kg event at the 2012 Summer Olympics losing in the first round. She competed in the women's 70 kg event at the 2014 Commonwealth Games where she won the silver medal.

De Villiers is married to Jason Koster; he is also a judoka. They have a daughter together and her husband has a son from a previous relationship.
