= Samuel Hall (judoka) =

British judoka (born 1995)

Personal information
- Nationality: British
- Born: 20 August 1995 (age 30)
- Occupation: Judoka

Sport
- Country: United Kingdom
- Sport: Judo
- Weight class: ‍–‍60 kg, ‍–‍66 kg

Achievements and titles
- World Champ.: R32 (2022)
- European Champ.: R32 (2022, 2023, 2024)
- Commonwealth Games: (silver) (2022)
Medal record
Men's judo
Representing Great Britain
IJF Grand Slam
| Bronze medal – third place | 2021 Abu Dhabi | ‍–‍60 kg |
IJF Grand Prix
| Gold medal – first place | 2021 Zagreb | ‍–‍60 kg |
| Bronze medal – third place | 2022 Perth | ‍–‍60 kg |
European Junior Championships
| Silver medal – second place | 2015 Oberwart | ‍–‍60 kg |
Representing England
Commonwealth Games
| Silver medal – second place | 2022 Birmingham | ‍–‍60 kg |

Profile at external databases
- IJF: 7849
- JudoInside.com: 56269
- Updated on 25 April 2024

Samuel Hall (born 20 August 1995) is a British judoka.

== Judo career ==
Hall is a four times champion of Great Britain, winning the British Judo Championships in 2016, 2017, 2019 and 2021.

He is the gold medallist of the 2021 Judo Grand Prix Zagreb in the -60 kg category. At the 2021 Judo Grand Slam Abu Dhabi held in Abu Dhabi, United Arab Emirates, he won one of the bronze medals in his event.
