= Yasmin Javadian =

British judoka (born 2000)

Personal information
- Born: 15 November 2000 (age 25) Coventry, West Midlands, United Kingdom
- Occupation: Judoka
- Height: 160 cm (5 ft 3 in)

Sport
- Sport: Judo
- Weight class: –52 kg
- Rank: 1st dan black belt
Medal record
Women's Judo
Representing Northern Ireland
Commonwealth Games
Bronze medal – third place	2022 Birmingham	52 kg
British Judo Championships
Gold medal – first place	2019	‍–‍52 kg
British University Championships
Gold medal – first place	2020	‍–‍52 kg
U21 British Judo Championships
Gold medal – first place	2019	‍–‍52 kg
Silver medal – second place	2018	‍–‍52 kg
Gold medal – first place	2017	‍–‍52 kg
U18 British Judo Championships
Gold medal – first place	2016	‍–‍52 kg
Gold medal – first place	2015	‍–‍52 kg
Gold medal – first place	2014	‍–‍48 kg
Representing Great Britain
U23 European Championships
Bronze medal – third place	2019 Izhevsk	‍–‍52 kg
U21 European Championships
Bronze medal – third place	2019 Vantaa	‍–‍52 kg
U21 European Cup
Bronze medal – third place	2018 Paks	‍–‍52 kg
Silver medal – second place	2018 La Coruna	‍–‍52 kg
Silver medal – second place	2018 Coimbra	‍–‍52 kg
U18 European Cup
Silver medal – second place	2017 Fuengirola	‍–‍52 kg
Bronze medal – third place	2017 Follonica	‍–‍52 kg
Bronze medal – third place	2016 Coimbra	‍–‍52 kg
Bronze medal – third place	2016 Cluj Napoca	‍–‍52 kg
Silver medal – second place	2015 Coimbra	‍–‍48 kg
Bronze medal – third place	2015 Fuengirola	‍–‍48 kg

Profile at external databases
- IJF: 20890
- JudoInside.com: 90690

Yasmin Javadian (born 15 November 2000) is a British judoka from Northern Ireland. She won the bronze medal in the Women’s -52 kg event at the 2022 Commonwealth Games held in Birmingham, whilst studying dentistry at the University of Birmingham. In 2019 she took the title at the British Judo Championships after winning the bronze medal in both the U21 and U23 European Judo Championships.

== Career ==
In 2019, Javadian became champion of Great Britain, winning the half-lightweight division at the British Judo Championships. In 2022, she won the bronze medal at the Commonwealth Games, in the women's 52 kg category, during her undergraduate study in the College of Medical and Dental Sciences at the University of Birmingham
