= Maria Celia Laborde =

Cuban judoka

Personal information
- Nationality: American
- Born: 2 August 1990 (age 36)
- Occupation: Judoka
- Height: 5 ft 1 in (155 cm)

Sport
- Country: Cuba; (until 2014); United States; (since 2022)
- Sport: Judo
- Weight class: ‍–‍48 kg

Achievements and titles
- Olympic Games: R16 (2024)
- World Champ.: (bronze) (2014)
- Pan American Champ.: (gold) (2014)
Medal record
Women's judo
Representing United States
Pan American Games
Bronze medal – third place	2023 Santiago	‍–‍48 kg
Pan American Championships
Silver medal – second place	2025 Santiago	‍–‍48 kg
Bronze medal – third place	2022 Lima	‍–‍48 kg
Bronze medal – third place	2023 Calgary	‍–‍48 kg
Bronze medal – third place	2024 Rio de Janeiro	‍–‍48 kg
Bronze medal – third place	2026 Panama City	‍–‍48 kg
World Masters
Silver medal – second place	2023 Budapest	‍–‍48 kg
IJF Grand Slam
Bronze medal – third place	2026 Tashkent	‍–‍48 kg
IJF Grand Prix
Gold medal – first place	2022 Perth	‍–‍48 kg
Gold medal – first place	2025 Guadalajara	‍–‍48 kg
Silver medal – second place	2025 Gold Coast	‍–‍48 kg
Silver medal – second place	2026 Lima	‍–‍48 kg
Bronze medal – third place	2025 Linz	‍–‍48 kg
Representing Cuba
World Championships
Bronze medal – third place	2014 Chelyabinsk	‍–‍48 kg
Pan American Championships
Gold medal – first place	2014 Guayaquil	‍–‍48 kg
IJF Grand Slam
Bronze medal – third place	2013 Paris	‍–‍48 kg
IJF Grand Prix
Gold medal – first place	2014 Havana	‍–‍48 kg

Profile at external databases
- IJF: 11808, 67154
- JudoInside.com: 56350
- Updated on 15 August 2026

Maria Celia Laborde (born 2 August 1990) is a Cuban-born American judoka.

Laborde won a bronze medal at the 2014 World Judo Championships in Chelyabinsk for Cuba. After winning bronze at the 2013 Paris Grand Slam, she immigrated to the United States. According to a USA Today profile on Laborde before her first appearance at the Olympic Games in 2024, she had been third in the world in her weight class at the time, which would have made her likely to represent Cuba at the 2016 games; however, she originally intended to take those qualification points and use them to represent the USA, but was told that she required American citizenship and had to start from scratch. Laborde received American citizenship in 2022, making her eligible to represent the USA, and claimed a bronze medal at the 2022 Pan American-Oceania Championships, in Lima, Peru.
