= Judo at the 2022 Commonwealth Games – Women's 48 kg =

Judo competition

Judo – Women's 48 kg at the 2022 Commonwealth Games
- Venue: Coventry Arena
- Dates: 1 August 2022
- Competitors: 9 from 9 nations

Medalists
gold medal	Geronay Whitebooi	South Africa
silver medal	Shushila Likmabam	India
bronze medal	Katryna Esposito	Malta
bronze medal	Amy Platten	England

The women's 48 kg judo competitions at the 2022 Commonwealth Games in Birmingham, England took place on August 1 at the Coventry Arena. Geronay Whitebooi of South Africa won the gold medal, beating Shushila Likmabam of India. Katryna Esposito of Malta and Amy Platten of England each won the bronze medal.

== Results ==
Round of 16
Ashleigh-Anne Barnikel (WAL)	10
Chamila Marappulige (SRI)	00

Quarter-finals
Priscilla Morand (MRI)	10
Veronica Tari (VAN)	00 (yellow card)
Shushila Devi Likmabam (IND)	10 (yellow card)
Harriet Boniface (MAW)	00 (yellow card)
Geronay Whitebooi (RSA)	10
Ashleigh-Anne Barnikel (WAL)	00
Amy Platten (ENG)	10
Katryna Esposito (MLT)	00

Semi-finals
Shushila Devi Likmabam (IND)	10
Priscilla Morand (MRI)	00
Geronay Whitebooi (RSA)	01
Amy Platten (ENG)	00

Final
Geronay Whitebooi (RSA)	01
Shushila Devi Likmabam (IND)	00

=== Repechages ===
Repechage
Harriet Boniface (MAW)	10 (yellow card)
Veronica Tari (VAN)	00
Katryna Esposito (MLT)	10
Ashleigh-Anne Barnikel (WAL)	00

Bronze medal
Harriet Boniface (MAW)	00
Amy Platten (ENG)	10
Katryna Esposito (MLT)	10
Priscilla Morand (MRI)	00
