= Judo at the 2023 Pan American Games – Women's 48 kg =

Judo Women's 48 kg at the 2023 Pan American Games
- Venue: Contact Sports Center
- Location: Santiago, Chile
- Date: 28 October
- Competitors: 11 from 10 nations
- Website: Official website

Medalists
gold medal	Alexia Nascimento (1st title)	Brazil
silver medal	Edna Carrillo	Mexico
bronze medal	Maria Celia Laborde	United States
bronze medal	Amanda Lima	Brazil

Competition at external databases
- Links: IJF

The women's 48 kg competition of the judo events at the 2023 Pan American Games was held on 28 October at the Contact Sports Center (Centro de Entrenamiento de los Deportes de Contacto) in Santiago, Chile. A total of 11 athletes from 10 NOC's competed.

== Schedule ==
All times are local (UTC−3)

Date	Time	Event
Saturday, 28 October 2023	10:00	Elimination round of 16
Saturday, 28 October 2023	10:00	Quarterfinals
Saturday, 28 October 2023	11:00	Repechage
Saturday, 28 October 2023	11:00	Semifinals
Saturday, 28 October 2023	15:00	Finals

== Results ==
=== Main Bracket ===
Round of 16
Jacqueline Solís (EAI)	00
Maria Celia Laborde (USA)	01 (yellow card)
Estefanía Soriano (DOM)	00
Erika Lasso (COL)	11
María Giménez (VEN)	00
Alexia Nascimento (BRA)	10

Quarter-finals
Amanda Lima (BRA)	10
Luz Peña (ECU)	00
Edna Carrillo (MEX)	10
Maria Celia Laborde (USA)	00
Mary Dee Vargas (CHI)	00 (yellow card)
Erika Lasso (COL)	10 (yellow card)
Keisy Perafán (ARG)	00
Alexia Nascimento (BRA)	10 (yellow card)

Semi-finals
Amanda Lima (BRA)	00
Edna Carrillo (MEX)	10
Erika Lasso (COL)	00
Alexia Nascimento (BRA)	01

Gold medal contest
Edna Carrillo (MEX)	00
Alexia Nascimento (BRA)	10

=== Repechage ===
Repechage
Luz Peña (ECU)	00 (yellow card)
Maria Celia Laborde (USA)	11 (yellow card)
Mary Dee Vargas (CHI)	10
Keisy Perafán (ARG)	00 (yellow card)

Bronze medal contests
Maria Celia Laborde (USA)	10 (yellow card)
Erika Lasso (COL)	01
Mary Dee Vargas (CHI)	00
Amanda Lima (BRA)	10
