= Kelly Deguchi =

Canadian judoka (born 1999)

Personal information
- Born: 13 February 1999 (age 27) Shiojiri, Nagano, Japan
- Occupation: Judoka

Sport
- Country: Canada
- Sport: Judo
- Weight class: ‍–‍52 kg

Achievements and titles
- Olympic Games: R32 (2024)
- World Champ.: 7th (2025)
- Pan American Champ.: (2021, 2022, 2024)
- Commonwealth Games: (silver) (2022)
Medal record
Women's judo
Representing Canada
Pan American Championships
Bronze medal – third place	2021 Guadalajara	‍–‍57 kg
Bronze medal – third place	2022 Lima	‍–‍52 kg
Bronze medal – third place	2024 Rio de Janeiro	‍–‍52 kg
Commonwealth Games
Silver medal – second place	2022 Birmingham	‍–‍52 kg

Profile at external databases
- IJF: 49228
- JudoInside.com: 139601
- Updated on 28 July 2024

Kelly Deguchi (born 13 February 1999) is a Canadian judoka.

== Career ==
Deguchi was born in Japan to a Canadian father and Japanese mother. Originally representing Japan, in 2018 she switched to represent Canada. She is the younger sister of Christa Deguchi, also a judoka.

She won the silver medal in Judo at the 2022 Commonwealth Games – Women's 52 kg .

She qualified to represent Canada at the 2024 Summer Olympics.

== See also ==
- Judo in Canada
- List of Canadian judoka
