= Judo at the 2026 Commonwealth Games – Women's 57 kg =

Judo competition

Judo – Women's 57 kg at the 2026 Commonwealth Games
- Venue: SEC Centre, Glasgow
- Date: July 31 2026
- Competitors: 11 from 10 nations

Medalists
gold medal	Acelya Toprak	England
silver medal	Yamini Mourya	India
bronze medal	Donne Breytenbach	South Africa
bronze medal	Lele Neirne	England

The Women's 57 kg judo competitions at the 2026 Commonwealth Games in Glasgow, Scotland will place on July 31 at the SEC Centre. Ten judoka entered in this class, representing nine nations.

== Seedings ==
The following judoka were seeded in advance of the draw:

Women's 57 kg
Seed	Judoka	Nation
1	Acelya Toprak	England
2	Yamini Mourya	India
3	Donne Breytenbach	South Africa
4	Marie Begue	Mauritius
5	Lele Neirne	England
6	Sylvia Nawila	Zambia
7	Frema Agyei	Ghana
8	Eritabeta Kourabi	Kiribati

== Results ==
=== Gold final path ===
Round of 16
Eritabeta Kourabi (KIR)	000
Kaina Delrieu (VAN)	100
Frema Agyei (GHA)	100
Adama Sesay (SLE)	010
Sylvia Nawila (ZAM)	100
Deann Walton (BAR)	000

Quarterfinals
Acelya Toprak (ENG)	100
Kaina Delrieu (VAN)	000
Marie Begue (MRI)	000
Lele Neirne (ENG)	100
Yamini Mourya (IND)	100
Frema Agyei (GHA)	000
Donne Breytenbach (RSA)	100
Sylvia Nawila (ZAM)	000

Semifinal
Acelya Toprak (ENG)	001
Lele Neirne (ENG)	000
Yamini Mourya (IND)	100
Donne Breytenbach (RSA)	000

Gold medal final
Acelya Toprak (ENG)	100
Yamini Mourya (IND)	000

=== Repechage/bronze medal path ===
Competitors who are eliminated by either finalist enter the repechage to contest for the bronze medals.

Repechage
Kaina Delrieu (VAN)	001
Marie Begue (MRI)	100
Frema Agyei (GHA)	100
Sylvia Nawila (ZAM)	001

Bronze medal
Marie Begue (MRI)	000
Donne Breytenbach (RSA)	100
Frema Agyei (GHA)	000
Lele Neirne (ENG)	100
