= Rachael Hawkes =

Northern Itish judoka (born 1994)

Personal information
- Born: 12 September 1994 (age 31)
- Occupation: Judoka

Sport
- Country: Great Britain (2018, since October 2025); Ireland (2021–March 2025)
- Sport: Judo
- Weight class: ‍–‍70 kg

Achievements and titles
- World Champ.: R32 (2023)
- European Champ.: R32 (2022, 2023)
- Commonwealth Games: (bronze) (2026)
Medal record
Women's judo
Representing Great Britain
IJF Grand Prix
Bronze medal – third place	2025 Gold Coast	‍–‍70 kg
Representing Northern Ireland
Commonwealth Games
Bronze medal – third place	2026 Glasgow	‍–‍70 kg

Profile at external databases
- IJF: 27915, 63195
- JudoInside.com: 83865
- Updated on 4 August 2026

Rachael Hawkes (born 12 September 1994) is a Northern Irish judoka. She won a bronze medal competing in the 70 kg division at the 2026 Commonwealth Games in Glasgow.

== Biography ==
From Omagh in County Tyrone, she began in judoka at Omagh Judo Club at the age of six years-old under coach Kathleen Keaveney. Later living in England and training at Camberley Judo Club in Surrey, Hawkes was later coached by he sister Sarah who also competed at the Commonwealth Games before becoming the Performance Lead for Northern Ireland Judo.

Hawkes represented Northern Ireland at the 2022 Commonwealth Games, where her sister also competed, and reached the bronze medal match, losing to England's Jemima Yeats-Brown. Four years later, Hawkes won a bronze medal in the 70kg category at the 2026 Commonwealth Games in Glasgow.
