= Amy Platten =

British judoka (born 2000)

Personal information
- Nationality: British (English)
- Born: 27 October 2000 (age 25) Hertfordshire
- Occupation: Judoka

Sport
- Country: Great Britain
- Sport: Judo
- Weight class: ‍–‍48 kg
- Club: Redbridge Club

Achievements and titles
- Commonwealth Games: (bronze) (2022)
Medal record
Women's judo
Representing Great Britain
IJF Grand Prix
Silver medal – second place	2022 Perth	‍–‍48 kg
European U23 Championships
Bronze medal – third place	2021 Budapest	‍–‍48 kg
Representing England
Commonwealth Games
Bronze medal – third place	2022 Birmingham	‍–‍48 kg

Profile at external databases
- IJF: 20887
- JudoInside.com: 95920
- Updated on 29 October 2022

Amy Platten (born 27 October 2000) is an English international judoka. She has represented England at the Commonwealth Games and won a bronze medal.

== Biography ==
Platten was the European Youth Olympic Festival champion in 2017 and won a bronze medal at the 2021 European Under-23 Championships. Also in 2021, she became champion of Great Britain, winning the light-heavyweight division at the British Judo Championships.

In 2022, she was selected for the 2022 Commonwealth Games in Birmingham, where she competed in the women's -48 kg, winning the bronze medal.
