= Enku Ekuta =

Nigerian judoka (born 1998)

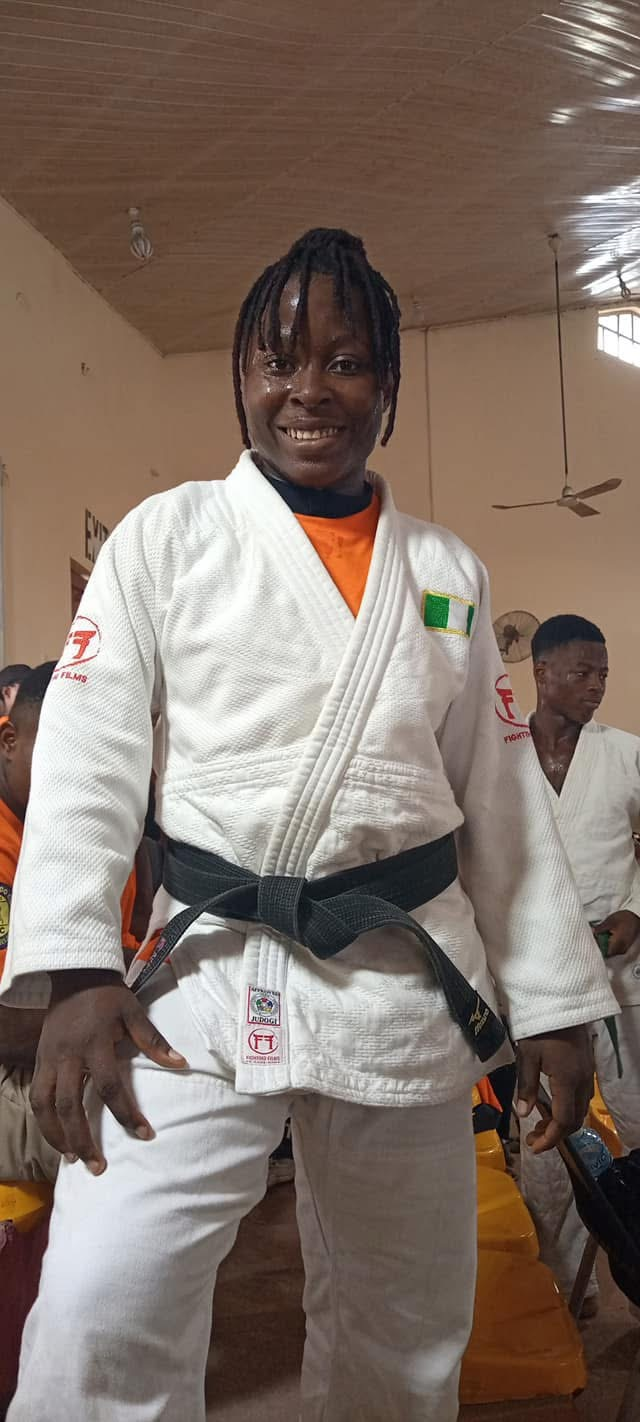
- At the 2020 Edo National Sports Festival

Personal information
- Full name: Enku Ewa Ekuta
- Born: 15 March 1998 (age 28)
- Occupation: Judoka

Sport
- Country: Nigeria
- Sport: Judo
- Weight class: ‍–‍63 kg

Achievements and titles
- African Champ.: (bronze) (2020)
- Commonwealth Games: (bronze) (2026)
Medal record
Women's judo
Representing Nigeria
African Championships
Bronze medal – third place	2020 Antananarivo	‍–‍63 kg
Commonwealth Games
Bronze medal – third place	2026 Glasgow	‍–‍63 kg

Profile at external databases
- IJF: 49279
- JudoInside.com: 143715
- Updated on 2 August 2026

Enku Ewa Ekuta (born 15 March 1998) is a Nigerian judoka who competed in the women's category.

Ekuta competed for Nigeria at local and international Judo competitions.

== Sports career ==
Ekuta hails from a family of Judokas. Her mum, Catherine Ekuta is a judoka who competed at international level for Nigeria while her dad Ewa Ekuta is a former Judoka who also excelled at National level. He is also part of the Nigeria Judo Federation.

At the 2020 African Judo Championships in Dakar, Ekuta competed in the 63 kg event and won a gold medal by defeating the 2019 African games champion and 2014 commonwealth silver medalist Hélène Wezeu Dombeu of Cameroun.

At the 2019 African Judo Championships held in cameroun, She won a silver medal in the 63 kg event.

She also won a bronze medal at the 2019 African Judo Championships held in Senegal.

She is also a National Youth Games champion and a Nigeria University Games gold medalist.

She finished with a bronze medal at the 2026 Commonwealth Games in Glasgow
