= Joy Asonye =

Nigerian Olympic judoka

Personal information
- Full name: Joy Asonye Oluchi
- Nationality: Nigeria
- Born: 8 November 1996 (age 29)

Sport
- Sport: Judo
- Event: 78 kg

Joy Asonye Oluchi (born 8 November 1996) is a Nigerian judoka, who played for the half-heavyweight category.

She competed for Nigeria at local and international Judo competitions.

== Achievements ==
Oluchi represented Nigeria at the 2022 Commonwealth Games in England. She won Fiji's Shanice Takayawa in her repechage match but lost to Aoife Coughlan of Australia in the women's 70 kg quarter-final game.

She was among the Nigerian team that won medals in the African judo international championships in Niger republic in 2018.

She also participated in the African Senior Championships 2021 and the Yaounde African Open 2022.
