= Judo at the 2022 Commonwealth Games – Women's 57 kg =

Judo competition

Judo – Women's 57 kg at the 2022 Commonwealth Games
- Venue: Coventry Arena
- Dates: 1 August 2022
- Competitors: 10 from 9 nations

Medalists
gold medal	Christa Deguchi	Canada
silver medal	Acelya Toprak	England
bronze medal	Christianne Legentil	Mauritius
bronze medal	Malin Wilson	Scotland

The women's 57 kg judo competitions at the 2022 Commonwealth Games in Birmingham, England took place on August 1 at the Coventry Arena. A total of ten competitors from nine nations took part.

Former World Champion Christa Deguchi of Canada, competing in her first major multi-sport event won the gold medal, defeating Acelya Toprak of England in the gold medal match.

== Results ==
The draw is as follows:

Round of 16
Rita Kabinda (ZAM)	01
Suchika Tariyal (IND)	10
Malin Wilson (SCO)	10
Kamini Segaran (MAS)	00

Quarter-finals
Christa Deguchi (CAN)	11
Suchika Tariyal (IND)	00
Donne Breytenbach (RSA)	00
Lele Nairne (ENG)	01
Acelya Toprak (ENG)	10
Malin Wilson (SCO)	00
Christianne Legentil (MRI)	01
Qona Christie (NZL)	00

Semi-finals
Christa Deguchi (CAN)	01
Lele Nairne (ENG)	00
Acelya Toprak (ENG)	10 (yellow card)
Christianne Legentil (MRI)	00

Final
Christa Deguchi (CAN)	10
Acelya Toprak (ENG)	00

=== Repechages ===
Repechage
Suchika Tariyal (IND)	11 (yellow card)
Donne Breytenbach (RSA)	00
Malin Wilson (SCO)	10
Qona Christie (NZL)	00

Bronze medal
Suchika Tariyal (IND)	00 (yellow card)
Christianne Legentil (MRI)	01
Malin Wilson (SCO)	10 (yellow card)
Lele Nairne (ENG)	00
