= Judo at the 2022 Commonwealth Games – Men's 60 kg =

Judo competition

Judo – Men's 60 kg at the 2022 Commonwealth Games
- Venue: Coventry Arena
- Date: 1 August 2022
- Competitors: 20 from 15 nations

Medalists
gold medal	Ashley McKenzie	England
silver medal	Samuel Hall	England
bronze medal	Josh Katz	Australia
bronze medal	Vijay Kumar Yadav	India

The Men's 60 kg judo competitions at the 2022 Commonwealth Games in Birmingham, England, took place on August 1 at the Coventry Arena. A total of 20 competitors from 15 nations took part.

== Results ==
The draw is as follows:

=== Final ===
Final
Samuel Hall (ENG)	00
Ashley McKenzie (ENG)	10

=== Top half ===
Round of 32
1 Zeo Agudoo (GHA)	00
Daniel Rabbitt (WAL)	10
Petros Christodoulides (CYP)	10
Kenny Williams (SLE)	00

Round of 16
Samuel Hall (ENG)	10
Isamaela Solomon (NRU)	00
David Ferguson (SCO)	00
Daniel Rabbitt (WAL)	10
Bernadin Tsala Tsala (CMR)	01
Petros Christodoulides (CYP)	10
Simon Zulu (ZAM)	10
Tyrone Charles (TTO)	00

Quarterfinals
Samuel Hall (ENG)	10
Daniel Rabbitt (WAL)	00
Petros Christodoulides (CYP)	01 (yellow card)
Simon Zulu (ZAM)	00 (yellow card)

Semifinal
Samuel Hall (ENG)	10
Petros Christodoulides (CYP)	00

=== Bottom half ===
Round of 32
Thomas Mwenda (TAN)	00
Callum Bennett (WAL)	10
Alfred Bangura (LES)	01
Sandor Iddris (GHA)	10

Round of 16
Josh Katz (AUS)	10
Callum Bennett (WAL)	00
Vijay Kumar Yadav (IND)	10
Winsley Gangaya (MRI)	00 (yellow card)
Ashley McKenzie (ENG)	10
Sandor Iddris (GHA)	00
Dylan Munro (SCO)	10
Priyankara Wimukthi (SRI)	00 (yellow card)

Quarterfinals
Josh Katz (AUS)	10 (yellow card)
Vijay Kumar Yadav (IND)	00
Ashley McKenzie (ENG)	01 (yellow card)
Dylan Munro (SCO)	00

Semifinal
Josh Katz (AUS)	00 (yellow card)
Ashley McKenzie (ENG)	01

=== Repechages ===
Repechage
Daniel Rabbitt (WAL)	00 (yellow card)
Simon Zulu (ZAM)	10
Vijay Kumar Yadav (IND)	01
Dylan Munro (SCO)	00 (yellow card)

Bronze medal
Simon Zulu (ZAM)	00
Josh Katz (AUS)	10
Vijay Kumar Yadav (IND)	10
Petros Christodoulides (CYP)	00
