= Judo at the 2022 Commonwealth Games – Men's +100 kg =

Judo competition

Judo – Men's +100 kg at the 2022 Commonwealth Games
- Venue: Coventry Arena
- Dates: 3 August 2022
- Competitors: 10 from 10 nations

Medalists
gold medal	Marc Deschenes	Canada
silver medal	Kody Andrews	New Zealand
bronze medal	Sebastien Perrinne	Mauritius
bronze medal	Liam Park	Australia

The Men's +100 kg judo competitions at the 2022 Commonwealth Games in Birmingham, England took place on August 3 at the Coventry Arena. A total of ten competitors from ten nations took part.

== Results ==
The draw is as follows:

Round of 16
Giannis Antoniou (CYP)	10
Gerard Takayawa (FIJ)	00
Steven Moore (JAM)	00
Dominic Dugasse (SEY)	10 (yellow card)

Quarter-finals
Marc Deschenes (CAN)	10
Giannis Antoniou (CYP)	00 (yellow card)
Andrew McWatt (SCO)	00
Liam Park (AUS)	10
Kody Andrews (NZL)	10 (yellow card)
Dominic Dugasse (SEY)	01
Kalvin Afude (KEN)	00 (yellow card)
Sebastien Perrinne (MRI)	10

Semi-finals
Marc Deschenes (CAN)	10
Liam Park (AUS)	00
Kody Andrews (NZL)	10
Sebastien Perrinne (MRI)	00

Final
Marc Deschenes (CAN)	10
Kody Andrews (NZL)	00

=== Repechages ===
Repechage
Giannis Antoniou (CYP)	00
Andrew McWatt (SCO)	10
Dominic Dugasse (SEY)	10 (yellow card)
Kalvin Afude (KEN)	00 (yellow card)

Bronze medal
Andrew McWatt (SCO)	00
Sebastien Perrinne (MRI)	01
Dominic Dugasse (SEY)	00
Liam Park (AUS)	10 (yellow card)
