= Aoife Coughlan =

Australian judoka (born 1995)

Personal information
- Born: 13 October 1995 (age 31) Traralgon, Victoria, Australia
- Occupation: Judoka

Sport
- Country: Australia
- Sport: Judo
- Weight class: ‍–‍63 kg, ‍–‍70 kg

Achievements and titles
- Olympic Games: R16 (2020, 2024)
- World Champ.: 5th (2025)
- Regional finals: (gold) (2017, 2018, 2026); (bronze) (2019, 2021); (gold) (2025)
- Commonwealth Games: (gold) (2022)
Medal record
Women's judo
Representing Australia
Pan American-Oceania Championships
Gold medal – first place	2025 Santiago	‍–‍70 kg
Silver medal – second place	2023 Calgary	‍–‍70 kg
Silver medal – second place	2024 Rio de Janeiro	‍–‍70 kg
Bronze medal – third place	2022 Lima	‍–‍70 kg
Asian-Pacific Championships
Bronze medal – third place	2019 Fujairah	‍–‍70 kg
Bronze medal – third place	2021 Bishkek	‍–‍70 kg
Oceania Championships
Gold medal – first place	2017 Nukuʻalofa	‍–‍70 kg
Gold medal – first place	2018 Nouméa	‍–‍70 kg
Gold medal – first place	2026 Melbourne	‍–‍70 kg
Silver medal – second place	2012 Cairns	‍–‍63 kg
Silver medal – second place	2013 Apia	‍–‍63 kg
Silver medal – second place	2016 Canberra	‍–‍70 kg
Bronze medal – third place	2015 Nouvelle	‍–‍70 kg
IJF Grand Slam
Silver medal – second place	2022 Tokyo	‍–‍70 kg
Silver medal – second place	2025 Abu Dhabi	‍–‍70 kg
Silver medal – second place	2026 Tbilisi	‍–‍70 kg
Silver medal – second place	2026 Ulaanbaatar	‍–‍70 kg
Bronze medal – third place	2023 Tel Aviv	‍–‍70 kg
Bronze medal – third place	2023 Astana	‍–‍70 kg
Bronze medal – third place	2023 Abu Dhabi	‍–‍70 kg
Bronze medal – third place	2026 Abu Dhabi	‍–‍70 kg
IJF Grand Prix
Gold medal – first place	2023 Almada	‍–‍70 kg
Gold medal – first place	2025 Linz	‍–‍70 kg
Gold medal – first place	2025 Gold Coast	‍–‍70 kg
Silver medal – second place	2022 Perth	‍–‍70 kg
Bronze medal – third place	2023 Perth	‍–‍70 kg
Oceania Junior Championships
Gold medal – first place	2011 Papeete	‍–‍63 kg
Gold medal – first place	2012 Cairns	‍–‍63 kg
Gold medal – first place	2013 Apia	‍–‍70 kg
Gold medal – first place	2015 Nouvelle	‍–‍70 kg
Silver medal – second place	2010 Canberra	‍–‍63 kg
Commonwealth Games
Gold medal – first place	2022 Birmingham	‍–‍70 kg
Silver medal – second place	2026 Glasgow	‍–‍70 kg

Profile at external databases
- IJF: 3539
- JudoInside.com: 68639
- Updated on 31 October 2026

Aoife Coughlan (born 13 October 1995) is an Australian judoka.

Coughlan was picked for the Tokyo 2020 Olympics where she competed in the women's 70 kg event. She won her first bout against Kinaua Biribo of Kiribati but then lost to Giovanna Scoccimaro of Germany and did not advance to the quarterfinals.

She is the bronze medallist of the 2021 Asian-Pacific Judo Championships in the ‍–‍70 kg category.

== Personal life ==
Born in Australia, Coughlan is of Irish descent.
