= Acelya Toprak =

British judoka (born 1998)

Personal information
- Nationality: British (English)
- Born: 1 June 1998 (age 28) Lewisham, London
- Occupation: Judoka

Sport
- Sport: Judo
- Weight class: ‍–‍57 kg
- Club: Metro Club

Achievements and titles
- World Champ.: R16 (2024)
- European Champ.: 5th (2026)
- Commonwealth Games: (gold) (2026)
Medal record
Women's judo
Representing Azerbaijan
IJF Grand Slam
Bronze medal – third place	2024 Abu Dhabi	‍–‍57 kg
Representing Great Britain
IJF Grand Prix
Silver medal – second place	2022 Perth	‍–‍57 kg
Bronze medal – third place	2025 Guadalajara	‍–‍57 kg
European Junior Championships
Silver medal – second place	2017 Maribor	‍–‍57 kg
Representing England
Commonwealth Games
Gold medal – first place	2026 Glasgow	‍–‍57 kg
Silver medal – second place	2022 Birmingham	‍–‍57 kg

Profile at external databases
- IJF: 18893
- JudoInside.com: 81885
- Updated on 1 August 2026

Acelya Toprak (born 1 June 1998) is an English international judoka. She is the 2026 Commonwealth Games champion at ‍–‍57 kg. She had previously won a silver medal at the 2022 Games.

== Biography ==
Toprak won the 2017 European junior silver medal and won gold at the Dubrovnik European Cup in 2021. She won her first three British lightweight titles at the British Judo Championships in 2016, 2017 and 2021.

In 2022, she was selected for the 2022 Commonwealth Games in Birmingham, where she competed in the women's -57 kg, winning the silver medal.

She transferred allegiance to Azerbaijan in 2023 in an effort to qualify for the 2024 Summer Olympics, but returned to representing Great Britain in May 2025. In June 2025 she was selected to represent Great Britain at the 2025 World Judo Championships.

In December 2025, Toprak won the British lightweight title at the British Judo Championships for the fourth time.

At the 2026 Commonwealth Games, she won the gold medal in 57 kg division, defeating India's Yamini Mourya in the final.

== Personal life ==
Born in England, Toprak is of Turkish-Cypriot descent.
