= Judo at the 2022 Commonwealth Games – Women's 52 kg =

Judo competition

Judo – Women's 52 kg at the 2022 Commonwealth Games
- Venue: Coventry Arena
- Dates: 1 August 2022
- Competitors: 10 from 9 nations

Medalists
gold medal	Tinka Easton	Australia
silver medal	Kelly Deguchi	Canada
bronze medal	Yasmin Javadian	Northern Ireland
bronze medal	Charne Griesel	South Africa

The women's 52 kg judo competitions at the 2022 Commonwealth Games in Birmingham, England took place on August 1 at the Coventry Arena. A total of ten competitors from nine nations took part.

Tinka Easton of Australia won the gold medal, defeating Kelly Deguchi of Canada in the gold medal match.

== Results ==
The draw is as follows:

Round of 16
Kirsty Marsh (SCO)	11
Mariel Kalomor (VAN)	00
Sofia Asvesta (CYP)	10
Kimberley Renicks (SCO)	00

Quarter-finals
Kelly Deguchi (CAN)	10
Kirsty Marsh (SCO)	00 (yellow card)
Jacira Ferreira (MOZ)	00
Marie Céline Baba Matia (CMR)	01
Tinka Easton (AUS)	10 (yellow card)
Sofia Asvesta (CYP)	00
Charne Griesel (RSA)	00 (yellow card)
Yasmin Javadian (NIR)	10

Semi-finals
Kelly Deguchi (CAN)	11
Marie Céline Baba Matia (CMR)	00
Tinka Easton (AUS)	01
Yasmin Javadian (NIR)	00

Final
Kelly Deguchi (CAN)	00
Tinka Easton (AUS)	01

=== Repechages ===
Repechage
Kirsty Marsh (SCO)	01
Jacira Ferreira (MOZ)	10
Sofia Asvesta (CYP)	00
Charne Griesel (RSA)	01

Bronze medal
Jacira Ferreira (MOZ)	00
Yasmin Javadian (NIR)	01
Charne Griesel (RSA)	11
Marie Céline Baba Matia (CMR)	00 (yellow card)
