= Oceania Judo Union =

Oceania governing body in Judo

- Sport: Judo
- Membership: 20
- Abbreviation: OJU
- Founded: 1965
- Affiliation: International Judo Federation
- Headquarters: Tahiti, French Polynesia
- President: Rehia Davio
- Secretary: Robert Ivers

Official website
- oceaniajudo.org

The Oceania Judo Union (OJU) is the Oceania governing body in judo. It is a member of the world governing body International Judo Federation (IJF). The OJU was founded in 1965 with three member countries, Australia, New Zealand and Papua New Guinea and now has 20 member countries. The first OJU Championships were held in Auckland, New Zealand in 1965. Subsequent OJU Championship were held in 1966 Sydney, Australia; 1969 Taita, New Zealand, 1970 Noumea, New Caledonia, 1975 Christchurch, New Zealand then every second year until 2012, and every year since then until 2018.

The current President of the OJU is Mr. Rehia Davio of French Polynesia.

== See also ==
- Oceania Judo Championships
- List of judo organizations
- Judo by country
- Category:National members of the Oceanian Judo Union
