= 2022 Judo Oceania Open Perth =

Judo Competition

Judo 2022 Judo Perth Oceania Open
- Venue: Gold Netball Centre
- Location: Perth, Western Australia
- Dates: 29–30 October 2022
- Competitors: 127 from 32 nations

Competition at external databases
- Links: IJF • JudoInside

The 2022 Judo Oceania Open Perth was held at the Gold Netball Centre in Perth, Western Australia, from 29 to 30 October 2022 as part of the IJF World Tour and during the 2024 Summer Olympics qualification period. Like the 2019 Judo Oceania Open Perth before it, this "Continental Open" level event's rules were those of a Grand Prix level event, and it awarded ranking points as one.

== Medal summary ==
=== Men's events ===
Event	Gold	Silver	Bronze
Extra-lightweight (−60 kg)	Cédric Revol (FRA)	David Pulkrábek (CZE)	Samuel Hall (GBR)
Extra-lightweight (−60 kg)	Cédric Revol (FRA)	David Pulkrábek (CZE)	Maxime Merlin (FRA)
Half-lightweight (−66 kg)	Reda Seddouki (FRA)	Daikii Bouba (FRA)	Martin Setz (GER)
Half-lightweight (−66 kg)	Reda Seddouki (FRA)	Daikii Bouba (FRA)	Michael Fryer (GBR)
Lightweight (−73 kg)	Martin Hojak (SLO)	Benjamin Axus (FRA)	Valtteri Olin (FIN)
Lightweight (−73 kg)	Martin Hojak (SLO)	Benjamin Axus (FRA)	Eric Ham (GBR)
Half-middleweight (−81 kg)	Nicolas Chilard (FRA)	Lachlan Moorhead (GBR)	Leonardo Casaglia (ITA)
Half-middleweight (−81 kg)	Nicolas Chilard (FRA)	Lachlan Moorhead (GBR)	Tim Gramkow (GER)
Middleweight (−90 kg)	David Klammert (CZE)	Jamal Petgrave (GBR)	Paul Livolsi (FRA)
Middleweight (−90 kg)	David Klammert (CZE)	Jamal Petgrave (GBR)	Noah Walliss (NZL)
Half-heavyweight (−100 kg)	Rhys Thompson (GBR)	George Udsilauri (GER)	Tevita Takayawa (FIJ)
Half-heavyweight (−100 kg)	Rhys Thompson (GBR)	George Udsilauri (GER)	Isaac Bezzina (MLT)
Heavyweight (+100 kg)	Martti Puumalainen (FIN)	Vito Dragič (SLO)	I Gede Agastya Darma Wardana (INA)
Heavyweight (+100 kg)	Martti Puumalainen (FIN)	Vito Dragič (SLO)	Mun Gyu-seon (KOR)

=== Women's events ===
Event	Gold	Silver	Bronze
Extra-lightweight (−48 kg)	Maria Celia Laborde (USA)	Amy Platten (GBR)	Ellen Salens (BEL)
Extra-lightweight (−48 kg)	Maria Celia Laborde (USA)	Amy Platten (GBR)	Keisy Perafán (ARG)
Half-lightweight (−52 kg)	Sofía Fiora (ITA)	Jang Se-yun (KOR)	Angelica Delgado (USA)
Lightweight (−57 kg)	Lele Nairne (GBR)	Acelya Toprak (GBR)	Mariah Holguin (USA)
Lightweight (−57 kg)	Lele Nairne (GBR)	Acelya Toprak (GBR)	Věra Zemanová (CZE)
Half-middleweight (−63 kg)	Katharina Haecker (AUS)	Renata Zachová (CZE)	Prisca Awiti Alcaraz (MEX)
Half-middleweight (−63 kg)	Katharina Haecker (AUS)	Renata Zachová (CZE)	Agnese Zucco (ITA)
Middleweight (−70 kg)	Anka Pogačnik (SLO)	Aoife Coughlan (AUS)	Marlene Galandi (GER)
Middleweight (−70 kg)	Anka Pogačnik (SLO)	Aoife Coughlan (AUS)	Katie-Jemima Yeats-Brown (GBR)
Half-heavyweight (−78 kg)	Anna Monta Olek (GER)	Metka Lobnik (SLO)	Moira de Villiers (NZL)
Heavyweight (+78 kg)	Lee Hyeon-ji (KOR)	Sydnee Andrews (NZL)	—

Source Results

=== Medal table ===
* Host nation (Australia)

Rank	Nation	Gold	Silver	Bronze	Total
1	France (FRA)	3	2	2	7
2	Great Britain (GBR)	2	4	4	10
3	Slovenia (SLO)	2	2	0	4
4	Czech Republic (CZE)	1	2	1	4
5	Germany (GER)	1	1	3	5
6	South Korea (KOR)	1	1	1	3
7	Australia (AUS)*	1	1	0	2
8	Italy (ITA)	1	0	2	3
8	United States (USA)	1	0	2	3
10	Finland (FIN)	1	0	1	2
11	New Zealand (NZL)	0	1	2	3
12	Argentina (ARG)	0	0	1	1
12	Belgium (BEL)	0	0	1	1
12	Fiji (FIJ)	0	0	1	1
12	Indonesia (INA)	0	0	1	1
12	Malta (MLT)	0	0	1	1
12	Mexico (MEX)	0	0	1	1
Totals (17 entries)		14	14	24	52
