= Katie-Jemima Yeats-Brown =

British judoka (born 1995)

Jemima Yeats-Brown
Personal information
- Full name: Katie-Jemima Yeats-Brown
- Nickname: Mima
- Born: 5 July 1995 (age 31) Pembury, England
- Occupation: Judoka

Sport
- Country: Great Britain / England
- Sport: Judo
- Weight class: ‍–‍63 kg, ‍–‍70 kg, ‍–‍78 kg
- Retired: August 2026

Achievements and titles
- Olympic Games: R16 (2024)
- World Champ.: 5th (2018, 2023)
- European Champ.: R16 (2019, 2023)
- Commonwealth Games: (bronze) (2014, 2022, 2026)
Medal record
Women's judo
Representing Great Britain
IJF Grand Slam
Bronze medal – third place	2016 Abu Dhabi	‍–‍70 kg
Bronze medal – third place	2022 Abu Dhabi	‍–‍70 kg
Bronze medal – third place	2024 Astana	‍–‍70 kg
IJF Grand Prix
Bronze medal – third place	2016 Qingdao	‍–‍70 kg
Bronze medal – third place	2019 Tel Aviv	‍–‍78 kg
Bronze medal – third place	2022 Perth	‍–‍70 kg
European U23 Championships
Silver medal – second place	2016 Tel Aviv	‍–‍70 kg
World Juniors Championships
Bronze medal – third place	2014 Fort Lauderdale	‍–‍63 kg
World Cadets Championships
Bronze medal – third place	2011 Kyiv	‍–‍63 kg
European Cadet Championships
Gold medal – first place	2011 Cottonera	‍–‍63 kg
Representing England
Commonwealth Games
Bronze medal – third place	2014 Glasgow	‍–‍63 kg
Bronze medal – third place	2022 Birmingham	‍–‍70 kg
Bronze medal – third place	2026 Glasgow	‍–‍70 kg

Profile at external databases
- IJF: 7848
- JudoInside.com: 66148
- Updated on 1 August 2026

Katie-Jemima Yeats-Brown (born 5 July 1995), also known as Jemima Yeats-Brown, is a British former judoka who announced her retirement in August 2026. She previously trained full-time at the British Judo Centre of Excellence in Walsall.

== Early life and education ==
Yeats-Brown is from Pembury, Kent. She graduated from the University of Wolverhampton in 2023 with a degree in Sport and Exercise Science.

== Judo career ==
Yeats-Brown competed for England at the 2014 Commonwealth Games in the women's 63 kg event where she won a bronze medal.

She is a three times champion of Great Britain, winning the middleweight division at the British Judo Championships in 2016 and 2017 and the half-heavyweight title in 2018. In 2018, she finished fifth in the 2018 World Judo Championships in Baku, when ranked world 32 on IJF ranking list. Compeign in the women's 78 kg category she lost to Guusje Steenhuis in the quarter finals.

In 2022, Yeats-Brown went to her second Commonwealth Games, competing in the women's 70 kg category she won a bronze medal. She competed again for England at the 2026 Commonwealth Games, winning a bronze medal in the women's 70 kg event.
