= 2022 Pan American-Oceania Judo Championships =

Judo competition

2022 Judo Pan American-Oceania Judo Championships
- Venue: Villa Deportiva Nacional
- Location: Lima, Peru
- Dates: 15–17 April
- Competitors: 217 from 24 nations

Competition at external databases
- Links: IJF • JudoInside

The 2022 Pan American Judo Championships were held in Lima, Peru from 15 to 17 April 2022. This edition of the Pan American Judo Championships was combined with the Oceania Judo Championships.

== Medal table ==
* Host nation (Peru)

Rank	Nation	Gold	Silver	Bronze	Total
1	Brazil	8	5	3	16
2	Cuba	2	3	2	7
3	United States	1	1	6	8
4	Canada	1	1	4	6
5	Venezuela	1	1	0	2
6	Australia	1	0	5	6
7	Costa Rica	1	0	0	1
8	Peru*	0	3	1	4
9	Chile	0	1	1	2
10	Dominican Republic	0	0	5	5
11	Colombia	0	0	1	1
11	New Zealand	0	0	1	1
11	Panama	0	0	1	1
Totals (13 entries)		15	15	30	60

== Results ==
=== Men's events ===
Event	Gold	Silver	Bronze
Extra-lightweight (60 kg)	Sebastián Sancho; Costa Rica	Danny Porte; Cuba	Josh Katz; Australia Bernabé Vergara; Panama
Half-lightweight (66 kg)	Eric Takabatake; Brazil	Juan Postigos; Peru	Willian Lima; Brazil Ari Berliner; United States
Lightweight (73 kg)	Dominic Rodriguez; United States	Alonso Wong; Peru	Antoine Bouchard; Canada Magdiel Estrada; Cuba
Half-middleweight (81 kg)	Guilherme Schimidt; Brazil	Vinicius Panini; Brazil	Étienne Briand; Canada François Gauthier-Drapeau; Canada
Middleweight (90 kg)	Iván Felipe Silva Morales; Cuba	Marcelo Gomes; Brazil	Robert Florentino; Dominican Republic John Jayne; United States
Half-heavyweight (100 kg)	Shady El Nahas; Canada	Rafael Buzacarini; Brazil	Daryl Yamamoto; Peru Kayhan Ozcicek-Takagi; Australia
Heavyweight (+100 kg)	Andy Granda; Cuba	Rafael Silva; Brazil	Francisco Solis; Chile Christian Konoval; United States

=== Women's events ===
Event	Gold	Silver	Bronze
Extra-lightweight (48 kg)	Amanda Lima; Brazil	Mary Dee Vargas; Chile	Maria Celia Laborde; United States Estefanía Soriano; Dominican Republic
Half-lightweight (52 kg)	Larissa Pimenta; Brazil	Angelica Delgado; United States	Kelly Deguchi; Canada Tinka Easton; Australia
Lightweight (57 kg)	Jéssica Lima; Brazil	Arnaes Odelín; Cuba	Rafaela Silva; Brazil Mariah Holguin; United States
Half-middleweight (63 kg)	Katharina Haecker; Australia	Catherine Beauchemin-Pinard; Canada	Cindy Mera; Colombia Yusmari Reyes; Cuba
Middleweight (70 kg)	Elvismar Rodríguez; Venezuela	Luana Carvalho; Brazil	Aoife Coughlan; Australia Maria Portela; Brazil
Half-heavyweight (78 kg)	Mayra Aguiar; Brazil	Karen León; Venezuela	Moira de Villiers; New Zealand Eiraima Silvestre; Dominican Republic
Heavyweight (+78 kg)	Beatriz Souza; Brazil	Yuliana Bolívar; Peru	Moira Morillo; Dominican Republic Nina Cutro-Kelly; United States

=== Mixed event ===
Event	Gold	Silver	Bronze
Team	Brazil	Cuba	Australia Dominican Republic
