= Laurence Biron =

Canadian judoka (born 2003)

Personal information
- Born: November 28, 2003 (age 22)
- Occupation: Judoka

Sport
- Country: Canada
- Sport: Judo
- Weight class: ‍–‍63 kg

Achievements and titles
- Pan American Champ.: 7th (2023, 2025)
- Commonwealth Games: (gold) (2026)
Medal record
Women's judo
Representing Canada
IJF Grand Prix
Bronze medal – third place	2026 Lima	‍–‍63 kg
Pan American Junior Championships
Gold medal – first place	2023 Calgary	‍–‍70 kg
Commonwealth Games
Gold medal – first place	2026 Glasgow	‍–‍63 kg

Profile at external databases
- IJF: 55085
- JudoInside.com: 129646
- Updated on 16 August 2026

Laurence Biron (born November 28, 2003) is a Canadian judoka.

== Career ==
In July 2026, Biron competed at the 2026 Commonwealth Games and won a gold medal in the –‍63 kg category. She defeated Australia's Saya Middleton in the final. In August, she competed at the 2026 Judo Grand Prix Lima and won a bronze medal in the −63 kg category.
