= Qona Christie =

New Zealand judoka (born 1999)

Personal information
- Full name: Qona Venus Harrigan Christie
- Born: 9 March 1999 (age 27) Sydney, Australia
- Occupation: Judoka

Sport
- Country: New Zealand
- Sport: Judo
- Weight class: ‍–‍57 kg, ‍–‍63 kg

Achievements and titles
- World Champ.: R32 (2023)
- Oceania Champ.: (gold) (2018)
- Commonwealth Games: 7th (2022)
Medal record
Women's judo
Representing New Zealand
Oceania Championships
Gold medal – first place	2018 Nouméa	‍–‍57 kg
Silver medal – second place	2017 Nukuʻalofa	‍–‍57 kg
Bronze medal – third place	2026 Melbourne	‍–‍63 kg
Oceania Junior Championships
Gold medal – first place	2018 Nouméa	‍–‍57 kg
Silver medal – second place	2016 Canberra	‍–‍52 kg
Silver medal – second place	2017 Nukuʻalofa	‍–‍57 kg
Bronze medal – third place	2015 Nouvelle	‍–‍52 kg

Profile at external databases
- IJF: 20892
- JudoInside.com: 96975
- Updated on 30 April 2026

Qona Venus Harrigan Christie (born 9 March 1999) is a New Zealand judoka. She competed in the Tunis and Algeria African Judo Open in early 2022 where she gained a bronze medal and a 5th placing respectively.

Christie has been selected to represent New Zealand at the 2022 Commonwealth Games.

== Personal life ==
Christie was born via sperm donor to a lesbian couple. Her father is gay, and also helped raise her with his partner. Her birth father is Australian, and her birth mother is from New Zealand, and she spent her childhood between both countries.
