= Yamini Mourya =

Indian judoka

Personal information
- Born: 26 March 1998 (age 28)
- Occupation: Judoka

Sport
- Country: India
- Sport: Judo
- Weight class: ‍–‍57 kg

Achievements and titles
- World Champ.: R32 (2026)
- Asian Champ.: 5th (2026)
- Commonwealth Games: (silver) (2026)
Medal record
Women's judo
Representing India
Asian Cadet Championships
Bronze medal – third place	2015 Bangkok	‍–‍57 kg
World University Games
Bronze medal – third place	2021 Chengdu	‍–‍57 kg
Commonwealth Games
Silver medal – second place	2026 Glasgow	‍–‍57 kg

Profile at external databases
- IJF: 28190
- JudoInside.com: 94186
- Updated on 2 August 2026

Yamini Mourya (born 26 March 1998) is an Indian judoka who competes in the women's 57 kg category. She won the silver medal in the women's 57 kg event at the 2026 Commonwealth Games. She is also the first Indian judoka to win a medal at the World University Games, doing so in 2023 at Chengdu 2021, and has won gold medals at the 2025 Hong Kong Asian Open and the 2026 Dakar African Open.

== Life and career ==
Yamini Mourya was born 26 March 1998, and hails from Sagar, Madhya Pradesh. She competes in the women's 57 kg category on the International Judo Federation World Tour. She trains in judo at the Inspire Institute of Sport in Ballari district under coach Jiwan Sharma.

Mourya won the Indian Under-18 National Judo Championships at Vadodara in 2015, and won a bronze medal in Asian Under-18 Judo Championships at Bangkok later that year. She won the Indian Under-21 National Judo Championships at Saifai in 2016, and a gold medal at the Senior National Judo Championships at Visakhapatnam in 2019.

In 2023, Mourya became the first Indian judoka to win a gold medal in the FISU World University Games at Chengdu. She also won the gold medal at the 2025 Hong Kong Asian Open and the 2026 Dakar African Open in the 57 kg category. In 2026, she finished fifth at the 2026 Asian Judo Championships and seventh at the 2026 Qazaqstan Barysy Grand Slam.

Mourya represented India at the 2026 Commonwealth Games in Glasgow. She won the quarter-final and semi-final bouts by an ippon, and advanced to the final of the women's 57 kg event. The final against England's Acelya Toprak went to golden score period after both the judokas remained scoreless during the normal period. During the golden score period, Mourya received her third shido penalty, which resulted in a hansoku-make and a win for Toprak. As a result, she won the silver medal.
