= Harriet Boniface =

Malawian judoka (born 1993)

Personal information
- Nationality: Malawian
- Born: 26 January 1993 (age 33)

Sport
- Country: Malawi
- Sport: Judo
- Weight class: 48 kg

Harriet Boniface (born 26 January 1993) is a Malawian Judoka, she represents Malawi internationally in Judo Tournament in the Extra-lightweight (48 kg) event. She competed at the Zone 6 Youth Games, winning a bronze medal, as well as the 2019 African Games.

== Life ==
Her home village is Chikowi, Zomba District.

Boniface is the first Malawian judoka to qualify for the Olympic Games and she competed at the 2020 Tokyo Games. Competing in the 48 kg division, she lost to Brazil's Gabrielle Chibana in the round of 32.

In 2022 she beat Veronica Tari from Vanuatu and she came close to winning a bronze medal at the 2022 Commonwealth Games in Birmingham when she was beaten by Shushila Devi Likmabam.
