= 2020 Asian-Pacific Judo Championships =

Cancelled judo event

The 2020 Asian-Pacific Judo Championships was a Judo event expected to take place in Ulaanbaatar, Mongolia. The championships were originally scheduled to take place from 17 to 19 April, then from 26 to 29 November, but were postponed both times due to the COVID-19 pandemic. The event was eventually cancelled.
