= Oceania Judo Championships =

Judo competition

- Current event or competition: 2026 Oceania Judo Championships

Competition details
- Competition date(s): 1965
- Discipline: Judo
- Type: Annual
- Organiser: Oceania Judo Union

History
- Most wins: Australia
- Most recent: 2025 Santiago
- Next edition: 2026 Melbourne

Oceania Judo Championships is the Judo Oceanian Championship organized by the Oceania Judo Union. From 2022 to 2025 the tournament was held together with the Pan American Judo Championships and renamed at that time to Pan American-Oceania Judo Championships.

== Tournaments ==
Tournaments
| Year | Host city (Country) | # Countries | # Athletes | Ref. |
|---|---|---|---|---|
| 1965 | Auckland, New Zealand | | | |
| 1966 | Sydney, Australia | | | |
| 1970 | Noumea, New Caledonia | | | |
| 1973 | Sydney, Australia | | | |
| 1975 | Christchurch, New Zealand | | | |
| 1977 | Melbourne, Australia | | | |
| 1979 | Rotorua, New Zealand | | | |
| 1981 | Suva, Fiji | | | |
| 1983 | Noumea, New Caledonia | | | |
| 1985 | Auckland, New Zealand | | | |
| 1988 | Sydney, Australia | | | |
| 1990 | Papeete, Tahiti, French Polynesia | | | |
| 1992 | Wellington, New Zealand | | | |
| 1994 | Sydney, Australia | | | |
| 1996 | Wellington, New Zealand | | | |
| 1998 | Apia, Samoa | | | |
| 2000 | Sydney, Australia | | | |
| 2002 | Wellington, New Zealand | | | |
| 2003 | Suva, Fiji | | | |
| 2004 | Noumea, New Caledonia | | | |
| 2006 | Papeete, Tahiti, French Polynesia | | | |
| 2008 | Christchurch, New Zealand | | | |
| 2010 | Canberra, Australia | 9 | 72 | |
| 2011 | Papeete, Tahiti, French Polynesia | 8 | 73 | |
| 2012 | Cairns/Sydney, Australia | 14 | 77 | |
| 2013 | Cairns, Australia; Apia, Samoa | 7 | 47 | |
| 2014 | Auckland, New Zealand | 8 | 123 | |
| 2015 | Paita, New Caledonia | 9 | 59 | |
| 2016 | Canberra, Australia | 9 | 62 | |
| 2017 | Nukuʻalofa, Tonga | 12 | 52 | |
| 2018 | Noumea, New Caledonia | 11 | 58 | |
as Asian-Pacific Judo Championships
| 2019 | Fujairah, United Arab Emirates | 39 | 271 | |
| ~~2020~~ | ~~Ulaanbaatar, Mongolia~~ | Cancelled | | |
| 2021 | Bishkek, Kyrgyzstan | 29 | 182 | |
as Pan American-Oceania Judo Championships
| 2022 | Lima, Peru | 24 | 217 | |
| 2023 | Calgary, Alberta, Canada | | | |
| 2024 | Rio de Janeiro, Brazil | | | |
| 2025 | Santiago, Chile | | | |
as Oceania Judo Championships
| 2026 | Melbourne, Australia | | | |
