= Judo at the 2015 Pan American Games =

Judo Judo at the 2015 Pan American Games
- Venue: Mississauga Sports Centre
- Location: Mississauga, Ontario, Canada
- Dates: July 11–14
- No. of events: 14 (7 men, 7 women)
- Competitors: 135 from 19 nations

Competition at external databases
- Links: IJF • JudoInside

Judo competitions at the 2015 Pan American Games in Toronto were held from July 11 to 14 at the Hershey Centre (Mississauga Sports Centre) in Mississauga. Due to naming rights the arena was known as the latter for the duration of the games. A total of fourteen judo events were held: seven each for men and women.

== Competition schedule ==
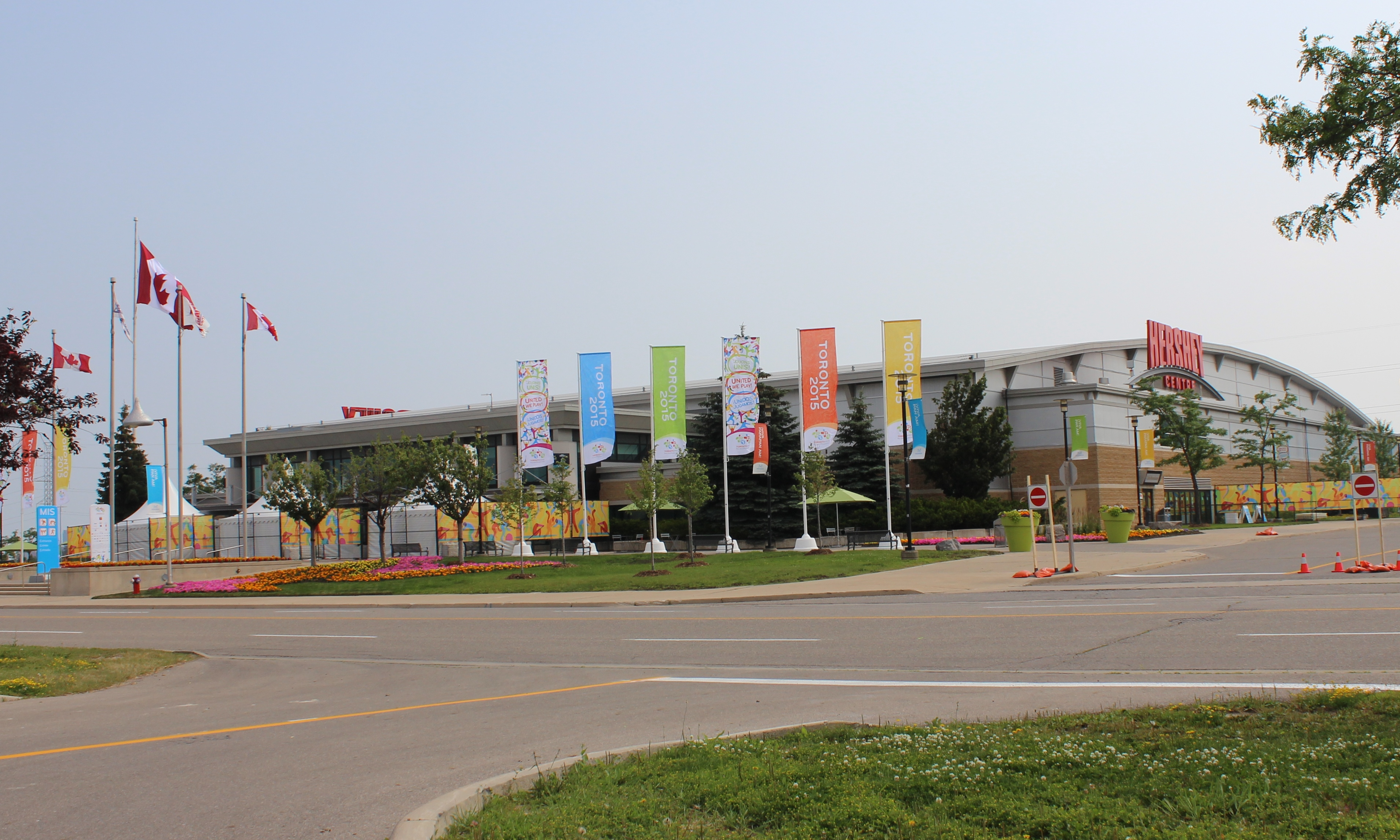
The Hershey Centre (Mississauga Sports Centre), in Mississauga, was the venue for the judo competitions.

The following was the competition schedule for the judo competitions:

| E | Eliminations | R | Repechage | SF | Semifinals | F | Final |

| Event↓/Date → | Sat 11 | | | | Sun 12 | | | | Mon 13 | | | | Tue 14 | | | |
|---|---|---|---|---|---|---|---|---|---|---|---|---|---|---|---|---|
| Men's 60 kg | E | R | SF | F | | | | | | | | | | | | |
| Men's 66 kg | | | | | E | R | SF | F | | | | | | | | |
| Men's 73 kg | | | | | E | R | SF | F | | | | | | | | |
| Men's 81 kg | | | | | | | | | E | R | SF | F | | | | |
| Men's 90 kg | | | | | | | | | E | R | SF | F | | | | |
| Men's 100 kg | | | | | | | | | | | | | E | R | SF | F |
| Men's +100 kg | | | | | | | | | | | | | E | R | SF | F |
| Women's 48 kg | E | R | SF | F | | | | | | | | | | | | |
| Women's 52 kg | E | R | SF | F | | | | | | | | | | | | |
| Women's 57 kg | | | | | E | R | SF | F | | | | | | | | |
| Women's 63 kg | | | | | | | | | E | R | SF | F | | | | |
| Women's 70 kg | | | | | | | | | E | R | SF | F | | | | |
| Women's 78 kg | | | | | | | | | | | | | E | R | SF | F |
| Women'ss +78 kg | | | | | | | | | | | | | E | R | SF | F |

== Medal table ==
* Host nation (Canada)

| Rank | Nation | Gold | Silver | Bronze | Total |
|---|---|---|---|---|---|
| 1 | Brazil | 5 | 2 | 6 | 13 |
| 2 | Cuba | 3 | 3 | 8 | 14 |
| 3 | United States | 3 | 0 | 3 | 6 |
| 4 | Ecuador | 2 | 1 | 0 | 3 |
| 5 | Canada* | 1 | 5 | 2 | 8 |
| 6 | Argentina | 0 | 2 | 2 | 4 |
| 7 | Mexico | 0 | 1 | 3 | 4 |
| 8 | Colombia | 0 | 0 | 3 | 3 |
| 9 | Puerto Rico | 0 | 0 | 1 | 1 |
| Totals (9 entries) | | 14 | 14 | 28 | 56 |

== Medalists ==
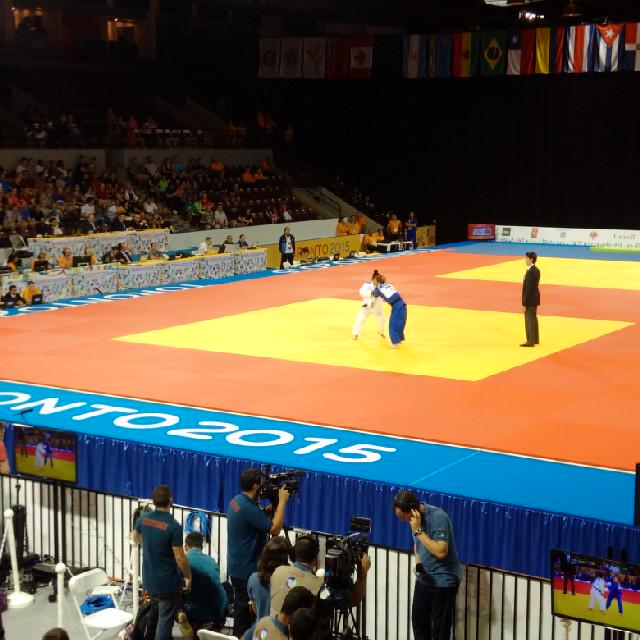
During the competition

=== Men's events ===
| Event | Gold | Silver | Bronze |
|---|---|---|---|
| Extra-lightweight (60 kg) | Lenin Preciado; Ecuador | Felipe Kitadai; Brazil | John Futtinico; Colombia |
| Extra-lightweight (60 kg) | Lenin Preciado; Ecuador | Felipe Kitadai; Brazil | Yandry Torres; Cuba |
| Half-lightweight (66 kg) | Charles Chibana; Brazil | Antoine Bouchard; Canada | Carlos Tondique; Cuba |
| Half-lightweight (66 kg) | Charles Chibana; Brazil | Antoine Bouchard; Canada | Fernando González; Argentina |
| Lightweight (73 kg) | Magdiel Estrada; Cuba | Alejandro Clara; Argentina | Augusto Miranda; Puerto Rico |
| Lightweight (73 kg) | Magdiel Estrada; Cuba | Alejandro Clara; Argentina | Arthur Margelidon; Canada |
| Half-middleweight (81 kg) | Travis Stevens; United States | Iván Felipe Silva Morales; Cuba | Pedro Castro; Colombia |
| Half-middleweight (81 kg) | Travis Stevens; United States | Iván Felipe Silva Morales; Cuba | Victor Penalber; Brazil |
| Middleweight (90 kg) | Tiago Camilo; Brazil | Asley González; Cuba | Jacob Larsen; United States |
| Middleweight (90 kg) | Tiago Camilo; Brazil | Asley González; Cuba | Isao Cárdenas; Mexico |
| Half-heavyweight (100 kg) | Luciano Corrêa; Brazil | Marc Deschenes; Canada | Hector Campos; Argentina |
| Half-heavyweight (100 kg) | Luciano Corrêa; Brazil | Marc Deschenes; Canada | José Armenteros; Cuba |
| Heavyweight (+100 kg) | David Moura; Brazil | Freddy Figueroa; Ecuador | Alex García Mendoza; Cuba |
| Heavyweight (+100 kg) | David Moura; Brazil | Freddy Figueroa; Ecuador | José Cuevas; Mexico |

=== Women's events ===
| Event | Gold | Silver | Bronze |
|---|---|---|---|
| Extra-lightweight (48 kg) | Dayaris Mestre Alvarez; Cuba | Paula Pareto; Argentina | Edna Carrillo; Mexico |
| Extra-lightweight (48 kg) | Dayaris Mestre Alvarez; Cuba | Paula Pareto; Argentina | Nathalia Brigida; Brazil |
| Half-lightweight (52 kg) | Érika Miranda; Brazil | Ecaterina Guica; Canada | Angelica Delgado; United States |
| Half-lightweight (52 kg) | Érika Miranda; Brazil | Ecaterina Guica; Canada | Gretter Romero; Cuba |
| Lightweight (57 kg) | Marti Malloy; United States | Catherine Beauchemin-Pinard; Canada | Rafaela Silva; Brazil |
| Lightweight (57 kg) | Marti Malloy; United States | Catherine Beauchemin-Pinard; Canada | Aliuska Ojeda; Cuba |
| Half-middleweight (63 kg) | Estefania Garcia; Ecuador | Stéfanie Tremblay; Canada | Maylín del Toro Carvajal; Cuba |
| Half-middleweight (63 kg) | Estefania Garcia; Ecuador | Stéfanie Tremblay; Canada | Mariana Silva; Brazil |
| Middleweight (70 kg) | Kelita Zupancic; Canada | Onix Cortés; Cuba | Maria Portela; Brazil |
| Middleweight (70 kg) | Kelita Zupancic; Canada | Onix Cortés; Cuba | Yuri Alvear; Colombia |
| Half-heavyweight (78 kg) | Kayla Harrison; United States | Mayra Aguiar; Brazil | Yalennis Castillo; Cuba |
| Half-heavyweight (78 kg) | Kayla Harrison; United States | Mayra Aguiar; Brazil | Catherine Roberge; Canada |
| Heavyweight (+78 kg) | Idalys Ortiz; Cuba | Vanessa Zambotti; Mexico | Maria Suelen Altheman; Brazil |
| Heavyweight (+78 kg) | Idalys Ortiz; Cuba | Vanessa Zambotti; Mexico | Nina Cutro-Kelly; United States |

== Participating nations ==
A total of 19 countries qualified athletes. The number of athletes a nation entered is in parentheses beside the name of the country.

- Argentina (11)
- Brazil (14)
- Canada (13)
- Chile (4)
- Colombia (8)
- Costa Rica (1)
- Cuba (14)
- Dominican Republic (8)
- Ecuador (10)
- El Salvador (3)
- Guatemala (3)
- Honduras (1)
- Mexico (12)
- Peru (4)
- Puerto Rico (3)
- Trinidad and Tobago (1)
- United States (11)
- Uruguay (2)
- Venezuela (12)

== Qualification ==
A total of 140 judokas (ten per weight category) will qualify to compete at the games. There will be six qualification events for athletes to earn ranking points, and the top nine nations qualify per event. The host nation (Canada) is automatically qualified in each event, for a total of ten per event. If the host nations is not ranked in the top ten places, Canada will take the place of the tenth ranked nation. If Canada is ranked in the top nine nations, the tenth ranked nation will qualify instead. A nation may enter a maximum of one athlete per weight category.

== See also ==
- Judo at the 2016 Summer Olympics
