= 2017 World Judo Championships – Men's +100 kg =

Judo competition

Judo Men's +100 kg at the 2017 World Judo Championships
- Venue: László Papp Budapest Sports Arena
- Location: Budapest, Hungary
- Dates: 2 September
- Competitors: 42 from 33 nations
- Total prize money: 57,000$

Medalists
gold medal	Teddy Riner (8th title)	France
silver medal	David Moura	Brazil
bronze medal	Naidangiin Tüvshinbayar	Mongolia
bronze medal	Rafael Silva	Brazil

Competition at external databases
- Links: IJF • JudoInside

The Men's +100 kg competition at the 2017 World Judo Championships was held on 2 September 2017.

== Results ==
=== Finals ===
Semi-finals
(Brazil) David Moura	10
(Hungary) Barna Bor	00
(Georgia (country)) Guram Tushishvili	00
(France) Teddy Riner	01

Final
(Brazil) David Moura	00
(France) Teddy Riner	10

=== Repechage ===
Repechage
(Mongolia) Naidangiin Tüvshinbayar	10
(Georgia (country)) Adam Okruashvili	00

Third place
(Mongolia) Naidangiin Tüvshinbayar	11
(Georgia (country)) Guram Tushishvili	00

Repechage
(Austria) Daniel Allerstorfer	00
(Brazil) Rafael Silva	10

Third place
(Brazil) Rafael Silva	00
(Hungary) Barna Bor	00

=== Pool A ===
First round
(Australia) Liam Park	00
(Serbia) Žarko Ćulum	11
(Bosnia and Herzegovina) Harun Sadiković	00
(Belarus) Aliaksandr Vakhaviak	11
(Austria) Stephan Hegyi	12
(Jordan) Mohammad Al-Rfooh	00

Second round
(Brazil) David Moura	10
(Serbia) Žarko Ćulum	00
(Kyrgyzstan) Iurii Krakovetskii	00
(Belarus) Aliaksandr Vakhaviak	10
(Japan) Hisayoshi Harasawa	00
(Austria) Stephan Hegyi	00
(Mongolia) Naidangiin Tüvshinbayar	11
(Kazakhstan) Yerzhan Shynkeyev	00

Third round
(Brazil) David Moura	01
(Belarus) Aliaksandr Vakhaviak	00
(Austria) Stephan Hegyi	00
(Mongolia) Naidangiin Tüvshinbayar	01

Quarterfinals
(Brazil) David Moura	01
(Mongolia) Naidangiin Tüvshinbayar	00

=== Pool B ===
First round
(South Africa) Kevin Keuvelaar	00
(Romania) Mircea Croitoru	10
(Algeria) Nadjib Temmar	10
(Senegal) Mbagnick Ndiaye	00
(Egypt) Ahmed Wahid	02
(Estonia) Juhan Mettis	01

Second round
(Hungary) Barna Bor	10
(Puerto Rico) Rafael Ferrer	00
(Romania) Mircea Croitoru	10
(China) Liu Jian	00
(Ukraine) Stanislav Bondarenko	10
(Algeria) Nadjib Temmar	00
(Georgia (country)) Adam Okruashvili	02
(Egypt) Ahmed Wahid	00

Third round
(Hungary) Barna Bor	11
(Romania) Mircea Croitoru	00
(Ukraine) Stanislav Bondarenko	00
(Georgia (country)) Adam Okruashvili	10

Quarterfinals
(Hungary) Barna Bor	13
(Georgia (country)) Adam Okruashvili	00

=== Pool C ===
First round
(Belarus) Uladzislau Tsiarpitski	00
(South Korea) Kim Sung-min	01
(Poland) Maciej Sarnacki	00
(Cuba) Alex García Mendoza	01

Second round
(Georgia (country)) Guram Tushishvili	11
(South Korea) Kim Sung-min	00
(Netherlands) Roy Meyer	00
(Cuba) Alex García Mendoza	01
(Japan) Takeshi Ojitani	11
(Uzbekistan) Mukhsin Khisomiddinov	00
(Ukraine) Iakiv Khammo	00
(Austria) Daniel Allerstorfer	00

Third round
(Georgia (country)) Guram Tushishvili	01
(Cuba) Alex García Mendoza	00
(Japan) Takeshi Ojitani	01
(Austria) Daniel Allerstorfer	02

Quarterfinals
(Georgia (country)) Guram Tushishvili	10
(Austria) Daniel Allerstorfer	00

=== Pool D ===
First round
(Egypt) Maisara El-Nagar	00
(France) Teddy Riner	11
(Azerbaijan) Ushangi Kokauri	00
(Brazil) Rafael Silva	10

Second round
(Mongolia) Duurenbayar Ulziibayar	00
(France) Teddy Riner	10
(Morocco) Adil Hajji	00
(Ecuador) Freddy Figueroa	10
(Romania) Daniel Natea	00
(Brazil) Rafael Silva	01
(Argentina) Héctor Campos	00
(Tunisia) Faicel Jaballah	10

Third round
(France) Teddy Riner	11
(Ecuador) Freddy Figueroa	00
(Brazil) Rafael Silva	11
(Tunisia) Faicel Jaballah	00

Quarterfinals
(France) Teddy Riner	12
(Brazil) Rafael Silva	00

== Prize money ==
The sums listed bring the total prizes awarded to 57,000$ for the individual event.

Medal	Total	Judoka	Coach
Gold	26,000$	20,800$	5,200$
Silver	15,000$	12,000$	3,000$
Bronze	8,000$	6,400$	1,600$
