= Judo at the 2023 Pan American Games – Women's 78 kg =

Judo Women's 78 kg at the 2023 Pan American Games
- Venue: Contact Sports Center
- Location: Santiago, Chile
- Date: 30 October
- Competitors: 10 from 9 nations
- Website: Official website

Medalists
gold medal	Samanta Soares (1st title)	Brazil
silver medal	Sairy Colón	Puerto Rico
bronze medal	Camila Figueroa	Peru
bronze medal	Eiraima Silvestre	Dominican Republic

Competition at external databases
- Links: IJF

The women's 78 kg competition of the judo events at the 2023 Pan American Games was held on 30 October at the Contact Sports Center (Centro de Entrenamiento de los Deportes de Contacto) in Santiago, Chile. A total of 10 athletes from 9 NOC's competed.

== Schedule ==
All times are local (UTC−3)

Date	Time	Event
Monday, 30 October 2023	10:00	Elimination round of 16
Monday, 30 October 2023	10:00	Quarterfinals
Monday, 30 October 2023	11:00	Repechage
Monday, 30 October 2023	11:00	Semifinals
Monday, 30 October 2023	15:00	Finals

== Results ==
=== Main Bracket ===
Round of 16
Eliza Ramos (BRA)	00
Sairy Colón (PUR)	10 (yellow card)
Keyra Ortiz (NCA)	00
Lianet Cardona (CUB)	11

Quarter-finals
Eiraima Silvestre (DOM)	01 (yellow card)
Coralie Godbout (CAN)	00
Camila Figueroa (PER)	00 (yellow card)
Sairy Colón (PUR)	11 (yellow card)
Vanessa Chalá (ECU)	10
Karina Venegas (CHI)	00
Samanta Soares (BRA)	11
Lianet Cardona (CUB)	00

Semi-finals
Eiraima Silvestre (DOM)	00
Sairy Colón (PUR)	10
Vanessa Chalá (ECU)	01
Samanta Soares (BRA)	10 (yellow card)

Gold medal contest
Sairy Colón (PUR)	00 (yellow card)
Samanta Soares (BRA)	01 (yellow card)

=== Repechage ===
Repechage
Coralie Godbout (CAN)	00
Camila Figueroa (PER)	10
Karina Venegas (CHI)	00
Lianet Cardona (CUB)	10

Bronze medal contests
Camila Figueroa (PER)	01 (yellow card)
Vanessa Chalá (ECU)	00
Lianet Cardona (CUB)	00
Eiraima Silvestre (DOM)	10
