= 2015 Pan American Judo Championships =

Judo competition

2015 Judo Pan American Judo Championships
- Venue: Edmonton
- Location: Edmonton, Alberta, Canada
- Dates: 24–26 April 2015
- Competitors: 195 from 23 nations

Competition at external databases
- Links: IJF • JudoInside

The 2015 Pan American Judo Championships was held in Edmonton, Alberta, Canada from April 24–26, 2015.

== Results ==
=== Men's events ===
Event	Gold	Silver	Bronze
Super extra-lightweight (55 kg)	Juan Trujillo; Colombia	Cristhian Toala; Ecuador	César Ramos; Mexico
Super extra-lightweight (55 kg)	Juan Trujillo; Colombia	Cristhian Toala; Ecuador	Not awarded
Extra-lightweight (60 kg)	Felipe Kitadai; Brazil	Eric Takabatake; Brazil	Aaron Kunihiro; United States
Extra-lightweight (60 kg)	Felipe Kitadai; Brazil	Eric Takabatake; Brazil	Lenin Preciado; Ecuador
Half-lightweight (66 kg)	Antoine Bouchard; Canada	Wander Mateo; Dominican Republic	Ángel Hernández; Mexico
Half-lightweight (66 kg)	Antoine Bouchard; Canada	Wander Mateo; Dominican Republic	Carlos Tondique; Cuba
Lightweight (73 kg)	Alex Pombo; Brazil	Magdiel Estrada; Cuba	Nicholas Delpopolo; United States
Lightweight (73 kg)	Alex Pombo; Brazil	Magdiel Estrada; Cuba	Arthur Margelidon; Canada
Half-middleweight (81 kg)	Victor Penalber; Brazil	Emmanuel Lucenti; Argentina	Travis Stevens; United States
Half-middleweight (81 kg)	Victor Penalber; Brazil	Emmanuel Lucenti; Argentina	Antoine Valois-Fortier; Canada
Middleweight (90 kg)	Tiago Camilo; Brazil	Asley González; Cuba	Rafael Romo; Chile
Middleweight (90 kg)	Tiago Camilo; Brazil	Asley González; Cuba	Cristian Schmidt; Argentina
Half-heavyweight (100 kg)	José Armenteros; Cuba	Luciano Corrêa; Brazil	Héctor Campos; Argentina
Half-heavyweight (100 kg)	José Armenteros; Cuba	Luciano Corrêa; Brazil	Kyle Reyes; Canada
Heavyweight (+100 kg)	David Moura; Brazil	Rafael Silva; Brazil	Freddy Figueroa; Ecuador
Heavyweight (+100 kg)	David Moura; Brazil	Rafael Silva; Brazil	Alex García Mendoza; Cuba

=== Women's events ===
Event	Gold	Silver	Bronze
Super extra-lightweight (44 kg)	Vanesa Godines Alemán; Cuba	Mónica Heredia; Ecuador	Not awarded
Super extra-lightweight (44 kg)	Vanesa Godines Alemán; Cuba	Mónica Heredia; Ecuador	Not awarded
Extra-lightweight (48 kg)	Sarah Menezes; Brazil	Paula Pareto; Argentina	Diana Cobos; Ecuador
Extra-lightweight (48 kg)	Sarah Menezes; Brazil	Paula Pareto; Argentina	Dayaris Mestre Álvarez; Cuba
Half-lightweight (52 kg)	Érika Miranda; Brazil	Angelica Delgado; United States	Ecaterina Guica; Canada
Half-lightweight (52 kg)	Érika Miranda; Brazil	Angelica Delgado; United States	Gretel Romero; Cuba
Lightweight (57 kg)	Marti Malloy; United States	Rafaela Silva; Brazil	Yadinis Amarís; Colombia
Lightweight (57 kg)	Marti Malloy; United States	Rafaela Silva; Brazil	Catherine Beauchemin-Pinard; Canada
Half-middleweight (63 kg)	Maylín del Toro Carvajal; Cuba	Mariana Silva; Brazil	Leilani Akiyama; United States
Half-middleweight (63 kg)	Maylín del Toro Carvajal; Cuba	Mariana Silva; Brazil	Olga Masferrer; Cuba
Middleweight (70 kg)	Kelita Zupancic; Canada	Yuri Alvear; Colombia	Onix Cortés; Cuba
Middleweight (70 kg)	Kelita Zupancic; Canada	Yuri Alvear; Colombia	Maria Portela; Brazil
Half-heavyweight (78 kg)	Mayra Aguiar; Brazil	Kayla Harrison; United States	Kaliema Antomarchi; Cuba
Half-heavyweight (78 kg)	Mayra Aguiar; Brazil	Kayla Harrison; United States	Yalennis Castillo; Cuba
Heavyweight (+78 kg)	Idalys Ortiz; Cuba	Rochele Nunes; Brazil	Nina Cutro-Kelly; United States
Heavyweight (+78 kg)	Idalys Ortiz; Cuba	Rochele Nunes; Brazil	Vanessa Zambotti; Mexico

== Medal table ==
* Host nation (Canada)

Rank	Nation	Gold	Silver	Bronze	Total
1	Brazil (BRA)	8	6	1	15
2	Cuba (CUB)	4	2	8	14
3	Canada (CAN)*	2	0	5	7
4	United States (USA)	1	2	5	8
5	Colombia (COL)	1	1	1	3
6	Ecuador (ECU)	0	2	3	5
7	Argentina (ARG)	0	2	2	4
8	Dominican Republic (DOM)	0	1	0	1
9	Mexico (MEX)	0	0	3	3
10	Chile (CHI)	0	0	1	1
Totals (10 entries)		16	16	29	61

== See also ==
- Judo at the 2015 Pan American Games
