= 2013 World Judo Championships – Women's +78 kg =

Judo competition

Judo Women's +78 kg at the 2013 World Judo Championships
- Venue: Ginásio do Maracanãzinho
- Location: Rio de Janeiro, Brazil
- Date: 31 August 2013
- Competitors: 21 from 20 nations

Medalists
gold medal	Idalys Ortiz (1st title)	Cuba
silver medal	Maria Suelen Altheman	Brazil
bronze medal	Megumi Tachimoto	Japan
bronze medal	Lee Jung-Eun	South Korea

Competition at external databases
- Links: IJF • JudoInside

The women's 78 kg competition of the 2013 World Judo Championships was held on August 31.

== Medalists ==
Gold	Silver	Bronze
Idalys Ortiz (CUB)	Maria Suelen Altheman (BRA)	Megumi Tachimoto (JPN); Lee Jung-Eun (KOR)

== Results ==
=== Pool A ===
Quarterfinals
(Algeria) Sonia Asselah	001
(Kazakhstan) Gulzhan Issanova	110
(South Korea) Kim Eun-Kyeong	101
(United Kingdom) Sarah Adlington	000

Semifinals
(Brazil) Maria Suelen Altheman	100
(Kazakhstan) Gulzhan Issanova	000
(Venezuela) Giovanna Blanco	000
(South Korea) Kim Eun-Kyeong	100

Final
(Brazil) Maria Suelen Altheman	100
(South Korea) Kim Eun-Kyeong	000

=== Pool B ===
Quarterfinals		Semifinals		Final
		(Turkey) Belkıs Zehra Kaya	000
(Spain) Sara Álvarez	000	(Bosnia and Herzegovina) Larisa Cerić	001
(Bosnia and Herzegovina) Larisa Cerić	101			(Bosnia and Herzegovina) Larisa Cerić	000
				(France) Emilie Andeol	100
		(France) Emilie Andeol	100
		(Argentina) Samantha da Cunha	000

=== Pool C ===
Quarterfinals		Semifinals		Final
		(Cuba) Idalys Ortiz	100
(Ecuador) Marlín Viveros	100	(Ecuador) Marlín Viveros	000
(Kenya) Esther Ratugi	000			(Cuba) Idalys Ortiz	000
				(Germany) Jasmin Külbs	000
		(Germany) Jasmin Külbs	000
		(Belarus) Maryna Slutskaya	000

=== Pool D ===
Quarterfinals
(Russia) Mariia Shekerova	100
(Colombia) Anny Cortes	000

Semifinals
(Japan) Megumi Tachimoto	100
(China) Kang Jie	000
(South Korea) Lee Jung-Eun	000
(Russia) Mariia Shekerova	000

Final
(Japan) Megumi Tachimoto	100
(South Korea) Lee Jung-Eun	000

=== Finals ===
Semi-finals
(Brazil) Maria Suelen Altheman	000
(France) Emilie Andeol	000
(Cuba) Idalys Ortiz	000
(Japan) Megumi Tachimoto	000

Final
(Brazil) Maria Suelen Altheman	000
(Cuba) Idalys Ortiz	100

=== Repechage ===
Repechage		Third place
(South Korea) Kim Eun-Kyeong	000
(Bosnia and Herzegovina) Larisa Cerić	100	(Bosnia and Herzegovina) Larisa Cerić	000
		(Japan) Megumi Tachimoto	100

Repechage		Third place
(Germany) Jasmin Külbs	000
(South Korea) Lee Jung-Eun	011	(South Korea) Lee Jung-Eun	101
		(France) Emilie Andeol	000
