= Judo at the 2019 Pan American Games – Men's +100 kg =

Men's +100 kg at the 2019 Pan American Games
- Venue: Polideportivo 3
- Dates: August 11
- Competitors: 10 from 10 nations

Medalists
Gold medal	Andy Granda	Cuba
Silver medal	Pedro Pineda	Venezuela
Bronze medal	David Moura	Brazil
Bronze medal	Freddy Figueroa	Ecuador

The men's +100 kg competition of the judo events at the 2019 Pan American Games in Lima, Peru, was held on August 11 at the Polideportivo 3.

== Results ==
All times are local (UTC−5)

=== Bracket ===
Round of 16
Ajax Tadehara (USA)	10
Frank Alvarado (PER)	00S2
José Nova (DOM)	10S1
Marc Deschênes (CAN)	00

Quarter Finals
Freddy Figueroa (ECU)	10
Ajax Tadehara (USA)	00
Héctor Campos (ARG)	00S3
Pedro Pineda (VEN)	10
Andy Granda (CUB)	10S2
José Nova (DOM)	00S2
Francisco Solis (CHI)	00S1
David Moura (BRA)	01

Semi Finals
Freddy Figueroa (ECU)	00S2
Pedro Pineda (VEN)	10
Andy Granda (CUB)	10S2
David Moura (BRA)	00S2

Final
Pedro Pineda (VEN)	00S2
Andy Granda (CUB)	10S1

=== Repechage round ===
Two bronze medals were awarded.

Repechage		Bronze medal
Ajax Tadehara (USA)	10S
Héctor Campos (ARG)	00S3	Ajax Tadehara (USA)	00S1
		David Moura (BRA)	10

Repechage		Bronze medal
José Nova (DOM)	00S2
Francisco Solis (CHI)	00S1	Francisco Solis (CHI)	00S1
		Freddy Figueroa (ECU)	01S2
