= Lee Jung-eun (judoka) =

South Korean judoka (born 1988)

Personal information
- Born: 9 April 1988 (age 38)
- Occupation: Judoka

Korean name
- Hangul: 이정은
- RR: I Jeongeun
- MR: I Chŏngŭn

Sport
- Country: South Korea
- Sport: Judo
- Weight class: +78 kg

Achievements and titles
- World Champ.: (bronze) (2013)
- Asian Champ.: (gold) (2013)
Medal record
Women's judo
Representing South Korea
World Championships
Bronze medal – third place	2013 Rio de Janeiro	+78 kg
Asian Games
Silver medal – second place	2014 Incheon	Women's team
Asian Championships
Gold medal – first place	2013 Bangkok	+78 kg
Bronze medal – third place	2007 Kuwait City	Open
Bronze medal – third place	2007 Kuwait City	+78 kg
IJF Grand Slam
Silver medal – second place	2014 Tyumen	+78 kg
IJF Grand Prix
Silver medal – second place	2013 Jeju	+78 kg
Bronze medal – third place	2010 Tunis	+78 kg
Asian Junior Championships
Bronze medal – third place	2003 Macau	+78 kg
Summer Universiade
Gold medal – first place	2013 Kazan	Women's team
Silver medal – second place	2007 Bangkok	Open
Silver medal – second place	2009 Belgrade	+78 kg

Profile at external databases
- IJF: 9155
- JudoInside.com: 35296
- Updated on 10 July 2023

Lee Jung-eun (born 9 April 1988) is a South Korean judoka. She won a Bronze medal in the +78 kg category at the 2013 World Judo Championships.
