= Nina Cutro-Kelly =

American judoka (born 1984)

Personal information
- Born: 12 December 1984 (age 41) Albany, New York
- Occupation: Judoka
- Years active: 2002 to current
- Height: 5 ft 9 in (175 cm)
- Weight: 220 lb (100 kg)
- Website: ninacutrokelly.com

Sport
- Country: United States
- Sport: Judo
- Weight class: +78 kg
- Rank: 3rd dan black belt
- Club: Universal Judo
- Coached by: Jim Hrbek

Achievements and titles
- Olympic Games: R32 (2020)
- World Champ.: R16 (2011)
- Pan American Champ.: (2021)
Medal record
Women's judo
Representing United States
Pan American Games
Bronze medal – third place	2015 Toronto	+78 kg
Pan American Championships
Silver medal – second place	2021 Guadalajara	+78 kg
Bronze medal – third place	2015 Edmonton	+78 kg
Bronze medal – third place	2017 Panama City	+78 kg
Bronze medal – third place	2022 Lima	+78 kg

Profile at external databases
- IJF: 55
- JudoInside.com: 19137
- Updated on 3 July 2022

Nina Cutro-Kelly (born 12 December 1984) is an American international level judoka. She competes in both judo and sambo. She competed in the women's +78 kg event at the 2020 Summer Olympics in Tokyo, Japan.

Cutro-Kelly is a member of Team USA, having competed in nine world championships in the sport of Judo. She competes as a heavyweight, and is a 3rd degree black belt. Cutro-Kelly was 2022 Deaflympic champion in judo in +78 kg.

Cutro-Kelly graduated of Union College in Schenectady, New York and received a Master's Degree from Université de Rennes in Rennes, France. She is openly bisexual.

Cutro-Kelly was suspended on April 12, 2023 for two years after violating the United States Anti-Doping Agency policies. She accepted her punishment without appeal. She was also ordered to vacate all of her wins obtained on and after October 2, 2022.
