= 2020 Pan American Judo Championships =

Judo competition

2020 Judo Pan American Judo Championships
- Venue: Guadalajara
- Location: Guadalajara, Mexico
- Dates: 19–22 November 2020
- Competitors: 122 from 17 nations

Competition at external databases
- Links: IJF • JudoInside

The 2020 Pan American Judo Championships was a judo event which took place in Guadalajara, Mexico, from 19 to 22 November 2020. The championships were originally scheduled to be held in Montreal, Canada, from 17 to 19 April 2020, but were postponed due to the COVID-19 pandemic.

== Medal table ==
* Host nation (Mexico)

Rank	Nation	Gold	Silver	Bronze	Total
1	Brazil (BRA)	5	6	4	15
2	Canada (CAN)	4	0	3	7
3	Cuba (CUB)	2	2	3	7
4	Puerto Rico (PUR)	1	1	0	2
5	Argentina (ARG)	1	0	2	3
5	Ecuador (ECU)	1	0	2	3
7	Panama (PAN)	1	0	0	1
8	United States (USA)	0	3	3	6
9	Mexico (MEX)*	0	2	1	3
10	Venezuela (VEN)	0	1	2	3
11	Peru (PER)	0	0	4	4
12	Dominican Republic (DOM)	0	0	2	2
13	Chile (CHI)	0	0	1	1
13	Costa Rica (CRC)	0	0	1	1
Totals (14 entries)		15	15	28	58

== Results ==
=== Men's events ===
Event	Gold	Silver	Bronze
Extra-lightweight (60 kg)	Eric Takabatake; Brazil	Adonis Diaz; United States	Steven Morocho; Ecuador Lenin Preciado; Ecuador
Half-lightweight (66 kg)	Daniel Cargnin; Brazil	Osniel Solís; Cuba	Tal Almog; Argentina Orlando Polanco; Cuba
Lightweight (73 kg)	Antoine Bouchard; Canada	Eduardo Barbosa; Brazil	Gilberto Cardoso; Mexico Alonso Wong; Peru
Half-middleweight (81 kg)	Adrián Gandía; Puerto Rico	Eduardo Yudi Santos; Brazil	Luis Angeles; Peru Medickson del Orbe; Dominican Republic
Middleweight (90 kg)	Iván Felipe Silva Morales; Cuba	Rafael Macedo; Brazil	Colton Brown; United States Zachary Burt; Canada
Half-heavyweight (100 kg)	Shady El Nahas; Canada	Rafael Buzacarini; Brazil	Robert Florentino; Dominican Republic Kyle Reyes; Canada
Heavyweight (+100 kg)	Andy Granda; Cuba	Rafael Silva; Brazil	David Moura; Brazil Marc Deschenes; Canada

=== Women's events ===
Event	Gold	Silver	Bronze
Extra-lightweight (48 kg)	Paula Pareto; Argentina	Edna Carrillo; Mexico	Keisy Perafán; Argentina Mary Dee Vargas; Chile
Half-lightweight (52 kg)	Ecaterina Guica; Canada	Luz Olvera; Mexico	Nahomys Acosta; Cuba Larissa Pimenta; Brazil
Lightweight (57 kg)	Miryam Roper; Panama	Leilani Akiyama; United States	Arnaes Odelín; Cuba Jéssica Pereira; Brazil
Half-middleweight (63 kg)	Catherine Beauchemin-Pinard; Canada	Anriquelis Barrios; Venezuela	Alisha Galles; United States Ketleyn Quadros; Brazil
Middleweight (70 kg)	Maria Portela; Brazil	María Pérez; Puerto Rico	Chantal Wright; United States Elvismar Rodríguez; Venezuela
Half-heavyweight (78 kg)	Vanessa Chalá; Ecuador	Nefeli Papadakis; United States	Diana Brenes; Costa Rica Karen León; Venezuela
Heavyweight (+78 kg)	Maria Suelen Altheman; Brazil	Beatriz Souza; Brazil	Yuliana Bolívar; Peru

- Only four competitors took part in the +78 kg event, so only one bronze was awarded

=== Mixed event ===
Event	Gold	Silver	Bronze
Mixed team	Brazil	Cuba	Peru
