= Alonso Wong =

Peruvian judoka (born 1993)

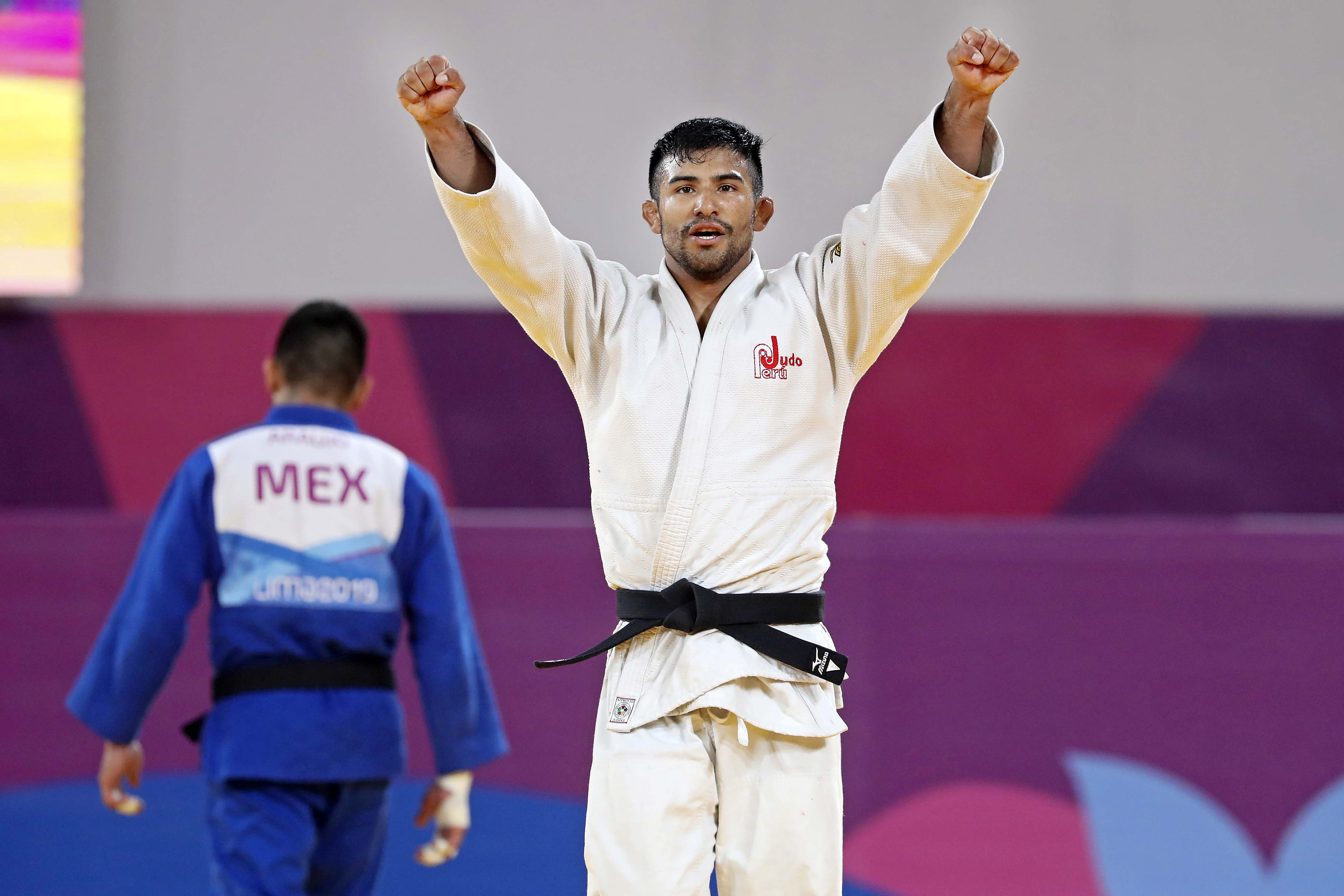

Personal information
- Born: 10 June 1993 (age 33)
- Occupation: Judoka

Sport
- Country: Peru
- Sport: Judo
- Weight class: ‍–‍66 kg, ‍–‍73 kg

Achievements and titles
- World Champ.: R64 (2011, 2014, 2015, 2017, 2019, 2021, 2023)
- Pan American Champ.: (2014, 2019, 2021, 2022)
Medal record
Men's judo
Representing Peru
Pan American Games
Silver medal – second place	2019 Lima	‍–‍73 kg
Pan American Championships
Silver medal – second place	2014 Guayaquil	‍–‍66 kg
Silver medal – second place	2021 Guadalajara	‍–‍73 kg
Silver medal – second place	2022 Lima	‍–‍73 kg
Bronze medal – third place	2016 Havana	‍–‍73 kg
Bronze medal – third place	2018 San José	‍–‍73 kg
Bronze medal – third place	2020 Guadalajara	‍–‍73 kg
IJF Grand Prix
Bronze medal – third place	2017 Cancún	‍–‍73 kg
Pan American Junior Championships
Silver medal – second place	2010 Buena Vista	‍–‍66 kg
Silver medal – second place	2013 Buenos Aires	‍–‍66 kg
South American Junior Championships
Gold medal – first place	2010 Buenos Aires	‍–‍66 kg

Profile at external databases
- IJF: 16049
- JudoInside.com: 69198
- Updated on 9 May 2023

Alonso Wong (born 10 June 1993) is a Peruvian judoka. He won the silver medal in the men's 73 kg event at the 2019 Pan American Games held in Lima, Peru.

== Career ==
He won the silver medal in the men's 66 kg event at the 2014 Pan American Judo Championships held in Guayaquil, Ecuador. In the following years, he competed in the 73 kg weight class. He won one of the bronze medals in the men's 73 event at this competition, both in 2016 and in 2018.

In 2020, he repeated this for the third time by winning one of the bronze medals in the men's 73 kg event at the Pan American Judo Championships held in Guadalajara, Mexico. In 2021, he competed in the men's 73 kg event at the World Judo Championships held in Budapest, Hungary.
