= Maria Suelen Altheman =

Brazilian judoka (born 1988)

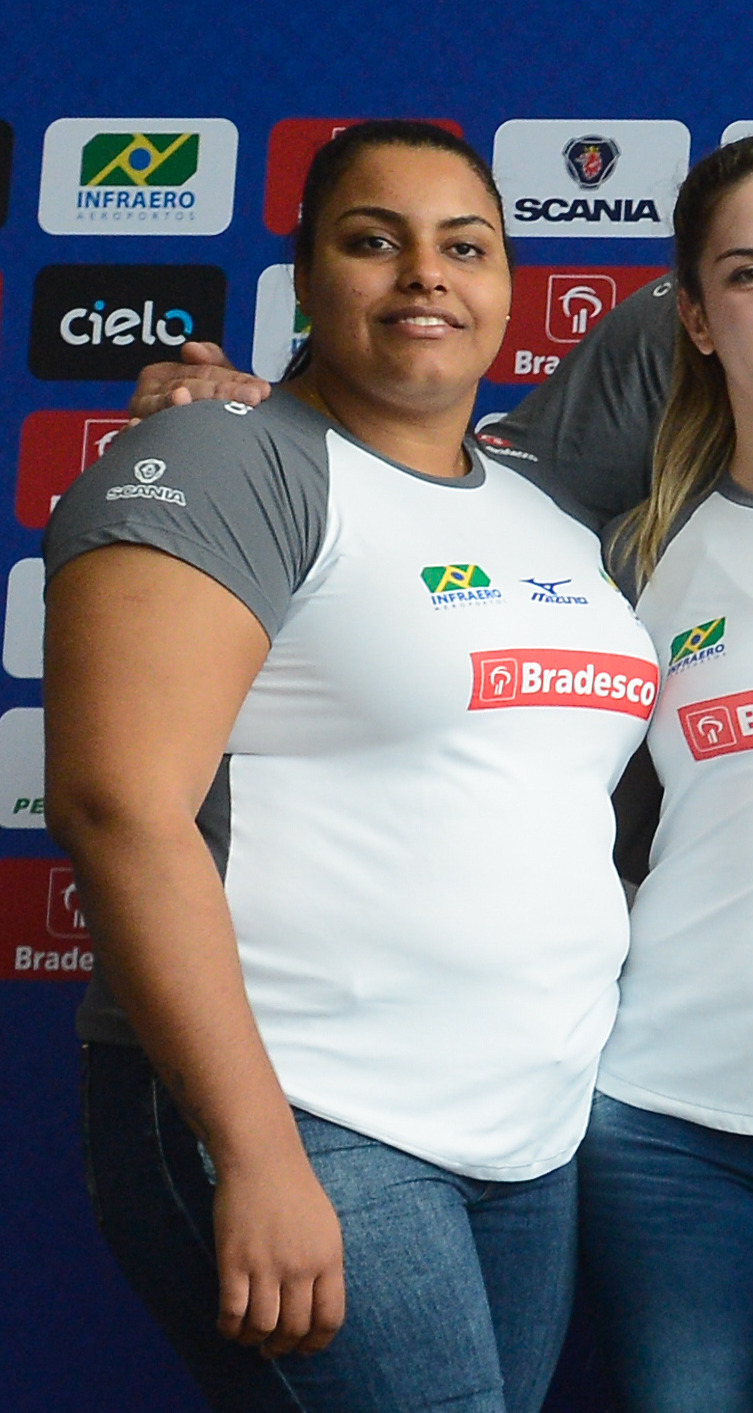
- Altheman in 2016

Personal information
- Born: 12 August 1988 (age 38) São Paulo, Brazil
- Occupation: Judoka
- Height: 175 cm (5 ft 9 in)
- Weight: 110 kg (243 lb)

Sport
- Country: Brazil
- Sport: Judo
- Weight class: +78 kg
- Club: Associação Rogério Sampaio
- Coached by: Adriano Santos

Achievements and titles
- Olympic Games: 5th (2012)
- World Champ.: (silver) (2013, 2014)
- Pan American Champ.: (gold) (2020)
Medal record
Women's judo
Representing Brazil
World Championships
Silver medal – second place	2013 Rio de Janeiro	+78 kg
Silver medal – second place	2014 Chelyabinsk	+78 kg
Bronze medal – third place	2021 Budapest	+78 kg
Bronze medal – third place	2021 Budapest	Mixed team
Pan American Games
Bronze medal – third place	2011 Guadalajara	+78 kg
Bronze medal – third place	2015 Toronto	+78 kg
Pan American Championships
Gold medal – first place	2020 Guadalajara	+78 kg
Silver medal – second place	2014 Guayaquil	+78 kg
Silver medal – second place	2016 Havana	+78 kg
Silver medal – second place	2019 Lima	+78 kg
Bronze medal – third place	2005 Caguas (PUR)	+78 kg
Bronze medal – third place	2010 San Salvador	+78 kg
Bronze medal – third place	2010 San Salvador	Open
Bronze medal – third place	2011 Guadalajara	+78 kg
Bronze medal – third place	2012 Montreal	+78 kg
World Masters
Silver medal – second place	2013 Tyumen	+78 kg
Bronze medal – third place	2017 Saint Petersburg	+78 kg
Bronze medal – third place	2018 Guangzhou	+78 kg
IJF Grand Slam
Gold medal – first place	2012 Moscow	+78 kg
Gold medal – first place	2013 Baku	+78 kg
Gold medal – first place	2013 Moscow	+78 kg
Gold medal – first place	2016 Abu Dhabi	+78 kg
Gold medal – first place	2019 Ekaterinburg	+78 kg
Silver medal – second place	2010 Rio de Janeiro	+78 kg
Silver medal – second place	2018 Ekaterinburg	+78 kg
Silver medal – second place	2019 Brasilia	+78 kg
Bronze medal – third place	2012 Tokyo	+78 kg
Bronze medal – third place	2014 Tyumen	+78 kg
Bronze medal – third place	2017 Abu Dhabi	+78 kg
Bronze medal – third place	2017 Tokyo	+78 kg
Bronze medal – third place	2019 Düsseldorf	+78 kg
Bronze medal – third place	2019 Abu Dhabi	+78 kg
Bronze medal – third place	2020 Budapest	+78 kg
Bronze medal – third place	2021 Tel Aviv	+78 kg
Bronze medal – third place	2021 Tbilisi	+78 kg
Bronze medal – third place	2021 Kazan	+78 kg
IJF Grand Prix
Gold medal – first place	2011 Amsterdam	+78 kg
Gold medal – first place	2013 Düsseldorf	+78 kg
Gold medal – first place	2016 Düsseldorf	+78 kg
Silver medal – second place	2012 Abu Dhabi	+78 kg
Silver medal – second place	2016 Tbilisi	+78 kg
Silver medal – second place	2017 Tbilisi	+78 kg
Silver medal – second place	2018 Cancún	+78 kg
Bronze medal – third place	2014 Samsun	+78 kg
Bronze medal – third place	2018 Hohhot	+78 kg

Profile at external databases
- IJF: 2081
- JudoInside.com: 52913
- Updated on 23 May 2023

Maria Suelen Altheman (born 12 August 1988) is a Brazilian heavyweight judoka. She won silver medals at the world championships in 2013 and 2014 and bronze medals at the Pan American Games in 2011 and 2015.

Altheman finished joint 5th at the 2012 Summer Olympics. She beat Anne-Sophie Mondière in her first match, then Nihel Cheikh Rouhou before losing to Mika Sugimoto in the quarterfinals. Because Sugimoto reached the final, Altheman was entered into the repechage. In the repechage, she beat Gulzhan Issanova before losing her bronze medal match to Tong Wen.

Altheman qualified for the 2016 Summer Olympics, where she lost in the first fight. At the 2020 Summer Olympics, Altman won her first fight only to injure her knee losing the quarterfinal to Romane Dicko, forcing her to abandon the tournament rather than go to the repechage. This turned out to be Altheman's last competition, as afterwards she operated her knee and would become a coach at Esporte Clube Pinheiros.
