= Freddy Figueroa =

Ecuadorian judoka (born 1994)

Personal information
- Born: 26 November 1994 (age 31)
- Occupation: Judoka

Sport
- Country: Ecuador
- Sport: Judo
- Weight class: +100 kg

Achievements and titles
- Olympic Games: R32 (2016)
- World Champ.: R16 (2017, 2019)
- Pan American Champ.: (2018)
Medal record
Men's judo
Representing Ecuador
Pan American Games
Silver medal – second place	2015 Toronto	+100 kg
Bronze medal – third place	2019 Lima	+100 kg
Pan American Championships
Gold medal – first place	2018 San José	+100 kg
Bronze medal – third place	2015 Edmonton	+100 kg
Bronze medal – third place	2017 Panama City	+100 kg
Bronze medal – third place	2021 Guadalajara	+100 kg
Bronze medal – third place	2023 Calgary	+100 kg
Bronze medal – third place	2024 Rio de Janeiro	+100 kg
Pan American Junior Championships
Gold medal – first place	2014 San Salvador	+100 kg
Bronze medal – third place	2013 Buenos Aires	+100 kg
South American Junior Championships
Bronze medal – third place	2013 Buenos Aires	+100 kg

Profile at external databases
- IJF: 12236
- JudoInside.com: 69887
- Updated on 29 April 2024

Freddy Figueroa (born 26 November 1994) is an Ecuadorian judoka. He competed at the 2016 Summer Olympics in the men's +100 kg event, in which he was eliminated in the first round by Kim Sung-min.
