= Antoine Bouchard (judoka) =

Canadian judoka (born 1994)

Personal information
- Born: 24 August 1994 (age 31)
- Occupation: Judoka

Sport
- Country: Canada
- Sport: Judo
- Weight class: ‍–‍66 kg / ‍–‍73 kg
- Retired: 18 November 2023

Achievements and titles
- Olympic Games: 5th (2016)
- World Champ.: R32 (2015)
- Pan American Champ.: (2015, 2018, 2020)
Medal record
Men's judo
Representing Canada
Pan American Games
Silver medal – second place	2015 Toronto	‍–‍66 kg
Bronze medal – third place	2023 Santiago	‍–‍73 kg
Pan American Championships
Gold medal – first place	2015 Edmonton	‍–‍66 kg
Gold medal – first place	2018 San José	‍–‍73 kg
Gold medal – first place	2020 Guadalajara	‍–‍73 kg
Bronze medal – third place	2016 Havana	‍–‍66 kg
Bronze medal – third place	2019 Lima	‍–‍73 kg
Bronze medal – third place	2022 Lima	‍–‍73 kg
IJF Grand Prix
Bronze medal – third place	2019 Marrakesh	‍–‍73 kg
Bronze medal – third place	2019 Montreal	‍–‍73 kg

Profile at external databases
- IJF: 9173
- JudoInside.com: 69922
- Updated on 21 November 2023

Antoine Bouchard (born 24 August 1994 in Jonquière, Quebec) is a Canadian retired judoka who competed in the men's ‍–‍66 kg and ‍–‍73 kg categories. He has been ranked in the world's top 10.

In June 2016, Bouchard was named to Canada's Olympic team.

== See also ==
- Judo in Quebec
- Judo in Canada
- List of Canadian judoka
