= José Armenteros =

Cuban judoka (born 1992)

Personal information
- Full name: José Alexis Armenteros Suárez
- Nationality: Cuban
- Born: 13 December 1992 (age 33)
- Occupation: Judoka

Sport
- Country: Cuba
- Sport: Judo
- Weight class: –100 kg

Achievements and titles
- Olympic Games: R16 (2016)
- World Champ.: (silver) (2014)
- Pan American Champ.: (2014, 2015, 2016, 2017)
Medal record
Men's judo
Representing Cuba
World Championships
Silver medal – second place	2014 Chelyabinsk	‍–‍100 kg
Pan American Games
Bronze medal – third place	2015 Toronto	‍–‍100 kg
Pan American Championships
Gold medal – first place	2014 Guayaquil	‍–‍100 kg
Gold medal – first place	2015 Edmonton	‍–‍100 kg
Gold medal – first place	2016 Havana	‍–‍100 kg
Gold medal – first place	2017 Panama City	‍–‍100 kg
Silver medal – second place	2013 San José	‍–‍100 kg
Bronze medal – third place	2018 San José	‍–‍100 kg
IJF Grand Prix
Silver medal – second place	2015 Jeju	‍–‍100 kg
Silver medal – second place	2016 Düsseldorf	‍–‍100 kg
World Juniors Championships
Gold medal – first place	2011 Cape Town	‍–‍100 kg

Profile at external databases
- IJF: 4378
- JudoInside.com: 71819
- Updated on 4 July 2023

José Alexis Armenteros Suárez (born 13 December 1992) is a Cuban judoka. He competed at the 2016 Summer Olympics in the men's 100 kg event, in which he was eliminated in the third round by Ramadan Darwish.
