= Judo at the 2019 Pan American Games – Women's 78 kg =

Women's 78 kg at the 2019 Pan American Games
- Venue: Polideportivo 3
- Dates: August 11
- Competitors: 10 from 10 nations

Medalists
Gold medal	Mayra Aguiar	Brazil
Silver medal	Kaliema Antomarchi	Cuba
Bronze medal	Diana Brenes	Costa Rica
Bronze medal	Vanessa Chalá	Ecuador

The women's 78 kg competition of the judo events at the 2019 Pan American Games in Lima, Peru, was held on August 11 at the Polideportivo 3.

== Results ==
All times are local (UTC−5)

=== Bracket ===
Round of 16
Diana Brenes (CRC)	11S1
Mina Coulombe (CAN)	01S3
Nefeli Papadakis (USA)	01
Camila Figueroa (PER)	00S2

Quarter Finals
Kaliema Antomarchi (CUB)	01S2
Diana Brenes (CRC)	00S2
Vanessa Chalá (ECU)	10
Lucía Cantero (ARG)	00
Mayra Aguiar (BRA)	10
Nefeli Papadakis (USA)	00
Karen León (VEN)	10S1
Liliana Cárdenas (MEX)	00S3

Semi Finals
Kaliema Antomarchi (CUB)	10S1
Vanessa Chalá (ECU)	00S1
Mayra Aguiar (BRA)	10
Karen León (VEN)	00

Final
Kaliema Antomarchi (CUB)	00S1
Mayra Aguiar (BRA)	10S1

=== Repechage round ===
Two bronze medals were awarded.

Repechage		Bronze medal
Diana Brenes (CRC)	10
Lucía Cantero (ARG)	00S2	Diana Brenes (CRC)	10
		Karen León (VEN)	00S3

Repechage		Bronze medal
Nefeli Papadakis (USA)	00S1
Liliana Cárdenas (MEX)	10	Liliana Cárdenas (MEX)	00S2
		Vanessa Chalá (ECU)	10
