= Marc Deschenes =

Canadian judoka (born 1993)

Personal information
- Nationality: Canadian
- Born: 1 January 1993 (age 33)
- Occupation: Judoka

Sport
- Country: Canada
- Sport: Judo
- Weight class: ‍–‍100 kg, +100 kg

Achievements and titles
- World Champ.: R32 (2021)
- Pan American Champ.: (2016, 2020, 2023)
- Commonwealth Games: (gold) (2022)
Medal record
Men's judo
Representing Canada
Pan American Games
Silver medal – second place	2015 Toronto	‍–‍100 kg
Pan American Championships
Bronze medal – third place	2016 Havana	‍–‍100 kg
Bronze medal – third place	2020 Guadalajara	+100 kg
Bronze medal – third place	2023 Calgary	+100 kg
IJF Grand Slam
Bronze medal – third place	2021 Abu Dhabi	+100 kg
Commonwealth Games
Gold medal – first place	2022 Birmingham	+100 kg

Profile at external databases
- IJF: 9170
- JudoInside.com: 50958
- Updated on 18 September 2023

Marc Deschenes (born 1 January 1993) is a Canadian judoka.

Deschenes is a bronze medalist of the 2021 Judo Grand Slam Abu Dhabi in the +100 kg category.
