= Mariya Shekerova =

Uzbekistani-Russian Olympic judoka

Personal information
- Born: 9 December 1988 (age 37)
- Occupation: Judoka
- Height: 1.78 m (5 ft 10 in)
- Weight: 104 kg (229 lb)

Sport
- Country: Uzbekistan (2006–09); Russia (2012–18)
- Sport: Judo
- Weight class: +78 kg

Achievements and titles
- Olympic Games: R32 (2008)
- World Champ.: R16 (2013)
- Asian Champ.: (silver) (2008)
Medal record
Women's judo
Representing Russia
Asian Championships
| Silver medal – second place | 2008 Jeju | +78 kg |
| Bronze medal – third place | 2004 Almaty | Open |
| Bronze medal – third place | 2005 Tashkent | +78 kg |
| Bronze medal – third place | 2005 Tashkent | Open |
| Bronze medal – third place | 2008 Jeju | Open |
IJF Grand Slam
| Bronze medal – third place | 2012 Moscow | +78 kg |
IJF Grand Prix
| Silver medal – second place | 2013 Miami | +78 kg |
| Bronze medal – third place | 2014 Tbilisi | +78 kg |
Asian Junior Championships
| Gold medal – first place | 2005 Beirut | +78 kg |
| Gold medal – first place | 2006 Jeju | +78 kg |
| Gold medal – first place | 2007 Hyderabad | +78 kg |
| Bronze medal – third place | 2003 Macau | +78 kg |
Summer Universiade
| Bronze medal – third place | 2013 Kazan | +78 kg |
| Bronze medal – third place | 2013 Kazan | Women's team |

Profile at external databases
- IJF: 10202, 52730
- JudoInside.com: 33038
- Updated on 27 November 2022

Mariya Shekerova (Russian: Мария Шекерова; born December 9, 1988) is an Uzbekistani-Russian judoka, who played for the heavyweight category. Shekerova represented Uzbekistan at the 2008 Summer Olympics in Beijing, where she competed for the women's heavyweight class (+78 kg). She lost the first preliminary match against France's Anne-Sophie Mondière, who successfully scored a waza-ari awasete ippon (two waza-ari), seven seconds before the five-minute period had ended.
