= Daniel Cargnin (judoka) =

Brazilian judoka (born 1997)

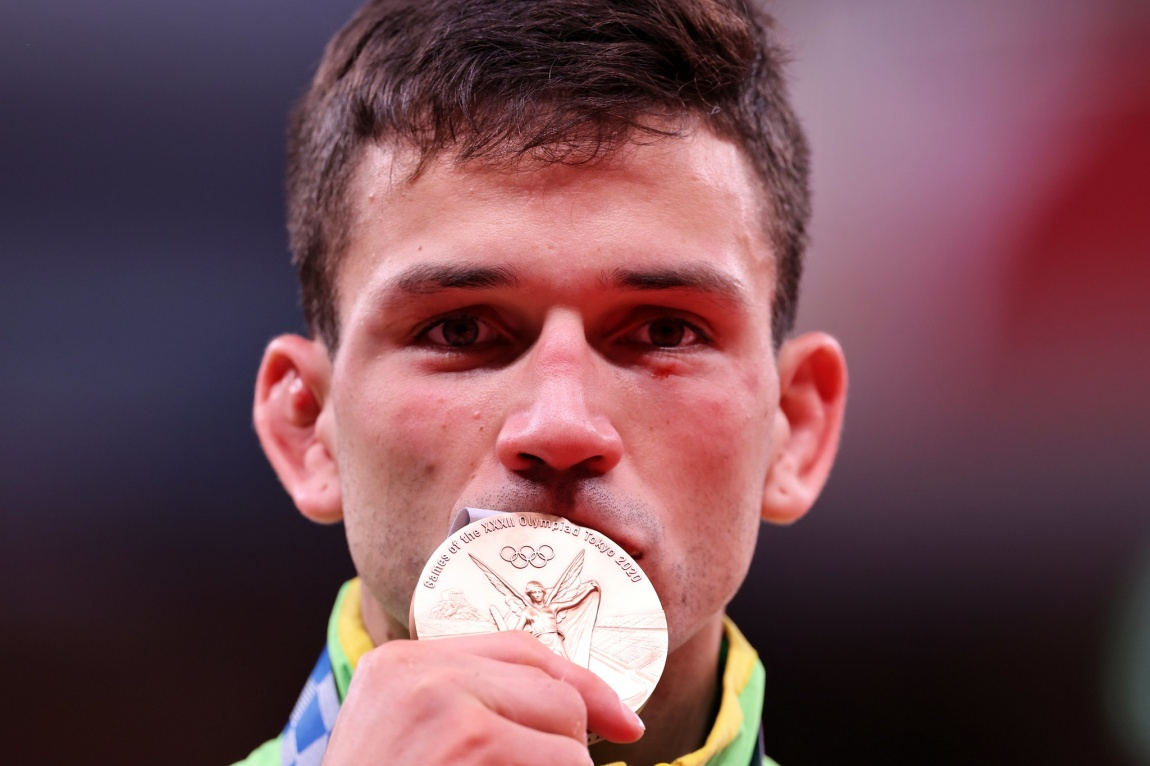
- Cargnin at the 2020 Summer Olympics

Personal information
- Full name: Daniel Borges Cargnin
- Nationality: Brazil
- Born: 20 December 1997 (age 28) Porto Alegre, Rio Grande do Sul, Brazil
- Occupation: Judoka
- Height: 168 cm (5 ft 6 in)

Sport
- Country: Brazil
- Sport: Judo
- Weight class: ‍–‍66 kg, ‍–‍73 kg

Achievements and titles
- Olympic Games: (bronze) (2020)
- World Champ.: (silver) (2025)
- Pan American Champ.: (gold) (2019, 2020, 2023, 2026)
Medal record
Men's judo
Representing Brazil
Olympic Games
Bronze medal – third place	2020 Tokyo	‍–‍66 kg
Bronze medal – third place	2024 Paris	Mixed team
World Championships
Silver medal – second place	2025 Budapest	‍–‍73 kg
Bronze medal – third place	2022 Tashkent	‍–‍73 kg
Pan American Games
Silver medal – second place	2019 Lima	‍–‍66 kg
Silver medal – second place	2023 Santiago	‍–‍73 kg
Silver medal – second place	2023 Santiago	Mixed team
Pan American Championships
Gold medal – first place	2019 Lima	‍–‍66 kg
Gold medal – first place	2020 Guadalajara	‍–‍66 kg
Gold medal – first place	2023 Calgary	‍–‍73 kg
Gold medal – first place	2023 Calgary	Mixed team
Gold medal – first place	2026 Panama City	‍–‍73 kg
Silver medal – second place	2017 Panama City	‍–‍66 kg
Silver medal – second place	2018 San José	‍–‍66 kg
Silver medal – second place	2024 Rio de Janeiro	‍–‍73 kg
Silver medal – second place	2025 Santiago	‍–‍73 kg
World Masters
Gold medal – first place	2022 Jerusalem	‍–‍73 kg
IJF Grand Slam
Gold medal – first place	2019 Brasilia	‍–‍66 kg
Gold medal – first place	2026 Lausanne	‍–‍73 kg
Silver medal – second place	2023 Paris	‍–‍73 kg
Bronze medal – third place	2023 Tel Aviv	‍–‍73 kg
Bronze medal – third place	2025 Abu Dhabi	‍–‍73 kg
IJF Grand Prix
Gold medal – first place	2025 Lima	‍–‍73 kg
Silver medal – second place	2018 Tbilisi	‍–‍66 kg
Bronze medal – third place	2020 Tel Aviv	‍–‍66 kg
Bronze medal – third place	2022 Zagreb	‍–‍73 kg
Bronze medal – third place	2026 Linz	‍–‍73 kg
World Juniors Championships
Gold medal – first place	2017 Zagreb	‍–‍66 kg
Bronze medal – third place	2015 Abu Dhabi	‍–‍66 kg
Pan American Junior Championships
Gold medal – first place	2017 Cancún	‍–‍66 kg
Silver medal – second place	2016 Cordoba	‍–‍66 kg
Pan American Cadet Championships
Gold medal – first place	2014 San Salvador	‍–‍60 kg

Profile at external databases
- IJF: 17835
- JudoInside.com: 55793
- Updated on 31 August 2026

Daniel Borges Cargnin (born 20 December 1997 in Porto Alegre) is a Brazilian judoka. He won the silver medal at the 2025 World Championships, and bronze medal at the 2020 Olympic Games and the 2022 World Championships, in addition to being three-time Pan American Judo champion.

== Career ==
Judo entered Cargnin's life very early, at the age of six. Encouraged by a school friend, the Porto Alegre native started playing the sport at an academy in Canoas, in the metropolitan region of Porto Alegre. He began to stand out and, at the age of 13, he received an invitation from coach Antônio Carlos Pereira, known as Kiko, to join the Sogipa team. However, until his adolescence, the gaucho still shared his attention with football — he was a right-back at Grêmio's schools. Until one day his mother, Ana Rita, advised her son to dedicate himself to just one of the activities. That was when Daniel chose judo and, since then, his evolution has been constant.

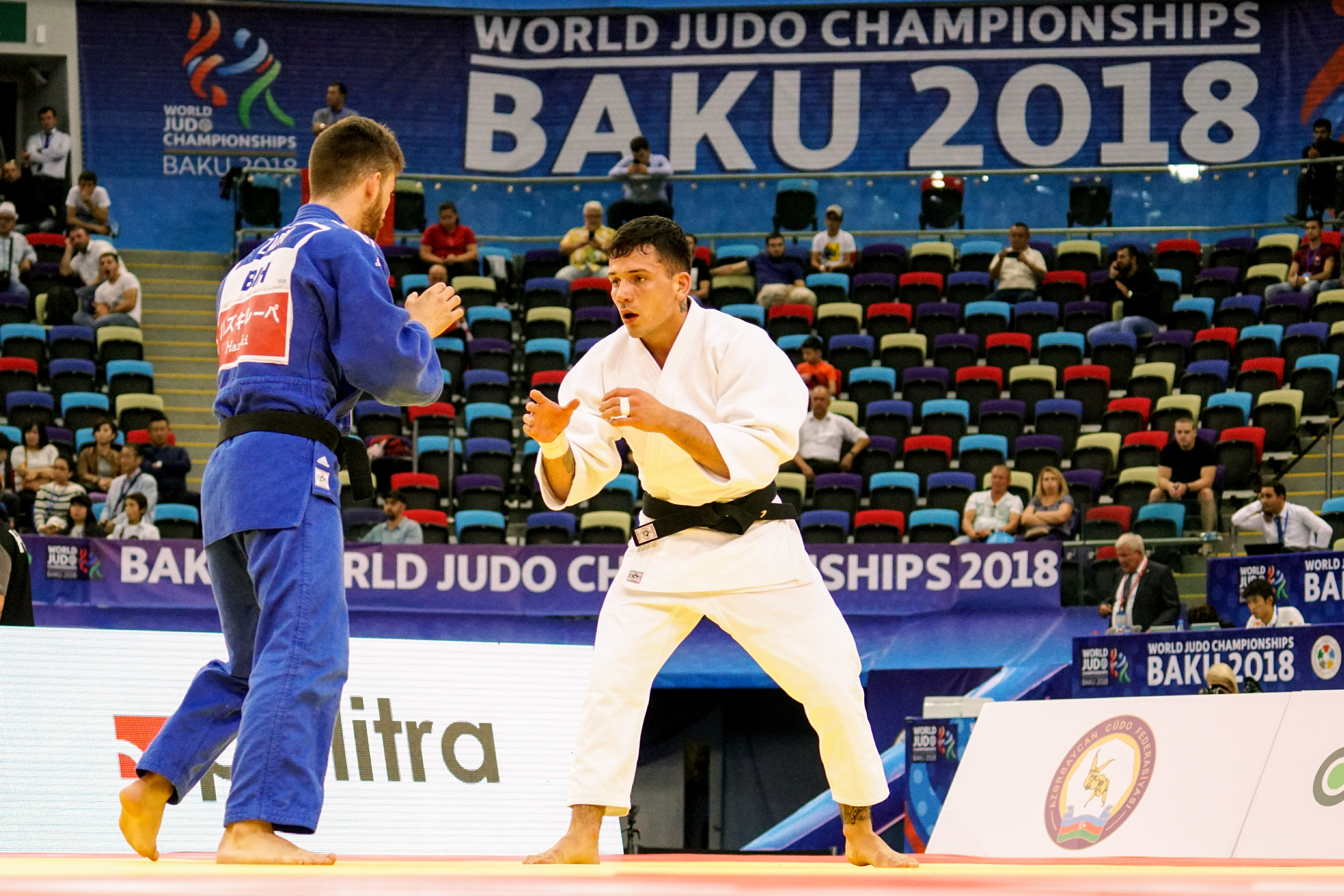
Cargin at the 2018 World Judo Championships

Since 2015, Daniel has participated in competitions for both the junior and senior Brazilian teams. But it was in 2017, after winning the 2017 World Judo Juniors Championships in Zagreb and becoming champion of the Olympic Trials, that Cargnin established himself in the main team, at the age of 20.

In Brazil, he was the main name in the welterweight division (-66 kg): 2019 Judo Grand Slam Brasilia champion, two-time Pan American champion (2019 and 2020) and runner-up at the 2019 Pan American Games in Lima.

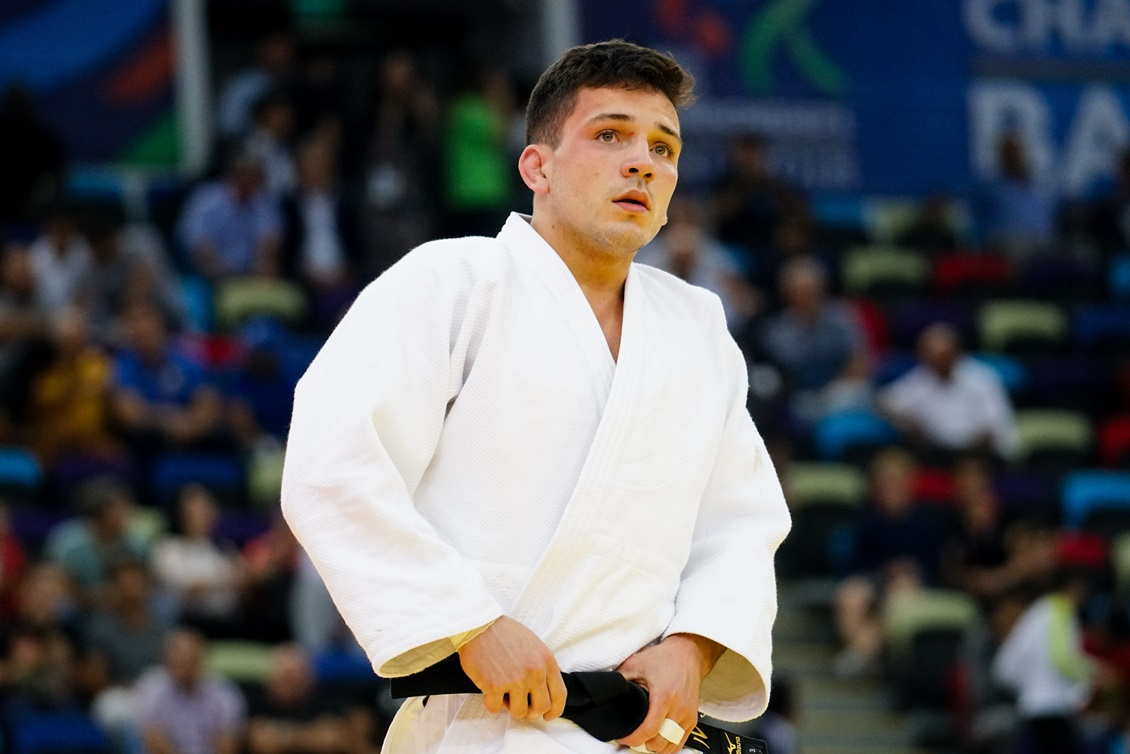
Cargin at the 2020 Judo Grand Slam Düsseldorf.

Cargnin won a bronze medal at the 2020 Summer Olympics. On June 16, 2021, Cargnin was called up by the Brazilian Judo Confederation (CBJ) for his first Olympics: the Tokyo 2020 Olympic Games, in Japan. The gaucho fought on July 25, the second day of the competition in Tokyo, and won the bronze medal. Daniel started the competition by beating the Egyptian Mohamed Abdelmawgoud, by ippon, on the golden score. Then, in the round of 16, he beat Moldovan Denis Vieru with a wazari also on the golden score. In the quarterfinals, he defeated the Italian Manuel Lombardo, world runner-up and leader of the ranking, with a wazari. In the semi-final, he lost by ippon to Japanese Hifumi Abe, two-time world champion. And, in the bronze medal match, he beat Israeli Baruch Shmailov with a wazari.

In January 2022, the judoka from Porto Alegre switched categories: he started to represent Brazil in the lightweight category (up to 73 kg).

At the 2022 World Judo Championships held in Tashkent, Uzbekistan, he won a bronze medal defeating world champion Manuel Lombardo.

At the 2022 Judo World Masters (second most important competition on the judo circuit, after the World Championship), Cargnin won the gold medal. The last time Brazil won gold at the Masters was 10 years ago, with Rafael Silva.

Cargnin once again stood out in the Grand Slams (the tournament that gives the most points in the judo rankings after the Olympics, the World Championships and the World Masters) in 2023. He won a silver at the 2023 Judo Grand Slam Paris and a bronze at the 2023 Judo Grand Slam Tel Aviv.

In 2023, Cargnin reached his third individual title at the Pan American Championship and also won a gold medal in the Brazil's mixed team, and at the Pan American Games, he reached the final, but due to a physical injury, he had to abandon the final, leaving the gold to his fellow compatriot Gabriel Falcão, ensuring, however, a place for the 2024 Olympic Games. He also obtained a silver medal for participating in the mixed team modality.

At the 2024 Pan American-Oceania Judo Championships, held in Rio de Janeiro, Cargnin reached the final, where, in a controversial fight, where the referee did not give several blows applied by the Brazilian to the Canadian Arthur Margelidon, and also stopped applying shidos to the Canadian, the Brazilian ended up with silver.

At the 2024 Judo World Championships, Cargnin reached the bronze medal match, but finished in 5th place in the competition.

At the 2024 Olympic Games in Paris, he lost in his debut to Kosovar Akil Gjakova. In the team competition, he lost two fights but ended up winning the bronze medal along with the rest of the Brazilian team.

At the 2025 Pan American-Oceania Judo Championships, held in Santiago, he won a silver medal.

At the 2025 World Judo Championships, Cargnin won 5 consecutive fights and reached the final for the first time in his career, defeating judokas such as European champion Akil Gjakova and Japanese Tatsuki Ishihara along the way. In the final, against Frenchman Joan-Benjamin Gaba, Olympic runner-up, he took the fight to the golden score, where he started bleeding from the head and ended up being defeated, finishing with the silver medal, in his best campaign in world championships.
