= 2017 Pan American Judo Championships =

Judo competition

2017 Judo Pan American Judo Championships
- Venue: Panama City
- Location: Panama City, Panama
- Dates: 28–29 April 2017
- Competitors: 188 from 23 nations

Competition at external databases
- Links: IJF • JudoInside

The 2017 Pan American Judo Championships was held in Panama City, Panama from 28 to 29 April 2017.

== Results ==
=== Men's events ===
Event	Gold	Silver	Bronze
Extra-lightweight (60 kg)	Eric Takabatake; Brazil	Lenin Preciado; Ecuador	Adonis Diaz; United States
Extra-lightweight (60 kg)	Eric Takabatake; Brazil	Lenin Preciado; Ecuador	Yandry Torres; Cuba
Half-lightweight (66 kg)	Osniel Solís; Cuba	Daniel Cargnin; Brazil	Ángel Hernández; Mexico
Half-lightweight (66 kg)	Osniel Solís; Cuba	Daniel Cargnin; Brazil	Juan Postigos; Peru
Lightweight (73 kg)	Eduardo Barbosa; Brazil	Eduardo Araújo; Mexico	Magdiel Estrada; Cuba
Lightweight (73 kg)	Eduardo Barbosa; Brazil	Eduardo Araújo; Mexico	Alexander Turner; United States
Half-middleweight (81 kg)	Eduardo Yudi Santos; Brazil	Emmanuel Lucenti; Argentina	Étienne Briand; Canada
Half-middleweight (81 kg)	Eduardo Yudi Santos; Brazil	Emmanuel Lucenti; Argentina	Jorge Martínez; Cuba
Middleweight (90 kg)	Iván Felipe Silva Morales; Cuba	Colton Brown; United States	Rafael Macedo; Brazil
Middleweight (90 kg)	Iván Felipe Silva Morales; Cuba	Colton Brown; United States	Víctor Ochoa; Mexico
Half-heavyweight (100 kg)	José Armenteros; Cuba	Andy Granda; Cuba	Pablo Aprahamian; Uruguay
Half-heavyweight (100 kg)	José Armenteros; Cuba	Andy Granda; Cuba	Leonardo Gonçalves; Brazil
Heavyweight (+100 kg)	Alex García Mendoza; Cuba	Héctor Campos; Argentina	Freddy Figueroa; Ecuador
Heavyweight (+100 kg)	Alex García Mendoza; Cuba	Héctor Campos; Argentina	Ruan Isquierdo; Brazil

=== Women's events ===
Event	Gold	Silver	Bronze
Extra-lightweight (48 kg)	Paula Pareto; Argentina	Edna Carrillo; Mexico	Katelyn Jarrell-Bouyssou; United States
Extra-lightweight (48 kg)	Paula Pareto; Argentina	Edna Carrillo; Mexico	Stefannie Arissa Koyama; Brazil
Half-lightweight (52 kg)	Jéssica Pereira; Brazil	Luz Olvera; Mexico	Angelica Delgado; United States
Half-lightweight (52 kg)	Jéssica Pereira; Brazil	Luz Olvera; Mexico	Ecaterina Guica; Canada
Lightweight (57 kg)	Jessica Klimkait; Canada	Catherine Beauchemin-Pinard; Canada	Marti Malloy; United States
Lightweight (57 kg)	Jessica Klimkait; Canada	Catherine Beauchemin-Pinard; Canada	Aliuska Ojeda; Cuba
Half-middleweight (63 kg)	Estefania García; Ecuador	Yanka Pascoalino; Brazil	Anriquelis Barrios; International Judo Federation^{A}
Half-middleweight (63 kg)	Estefania García; Ecuador	Yanka Pascoalino; Brazil	Hannah Martin; United States
Middleweight (70 kg)	Yuri Alvear; Colombia	Kelita Zupancic; Canada	Olga Masferrer; Cuba
Middleweight (70 kg)	Yuri Alvear; Colombia	Kelita Zupancic; Canada	Elvismar Rodríguez; International Judo Federation^{A}
Half-heavyweight (78 kg)	Samanta Soares; Brazil	Kaliema Antomarchi; Cuba	Diana Brenes; Costa Rica
Half-heavyweight (78 kg)	Samanta Soares; Brazil	Kaliema Antomarchi; Cuba	Liliana Cárdenas; Mexico
Heavyweight (+78 kg)	Beatriz Souza; Brazil	Melanie Bolaños; Mexico	Nina Cutro-Kelly; United States

== Medal table ==
Rank	Nation	Gold	Silver	Bronze	Total
1	Brazil	6	2	4	12
2	Cuba	4	2	5	11
3	Canada	1	2	2	5
4	Argentina	1	2	0	3
5	Ecuador	1	1	1	3
6	Colombia	1	0	0	1
7	Mexico	0	4	3	7
8	United States	0	1	7	8
9	International Judo Federation^{A}	0	0	2	2
10	Costa Rica	0	0	1	1
10	Peru	0	0	1	1
10	Uruguay	0	0	1	1
Totals (12 entries)		14	14	27	55

== Notes ==
A. Barrios and Rodríguez did not compete under the Venezuelan flag but under the International Judo Federation flag.
