= Leilani Akiyama =

American judoka (born 1987)

Personal information
- Born: February 21, 1987 (age 39)

Sport
- Country: United States
- Sport: Judo
Medal record
Women's judo
Representing United States
Pan American Judo Championships
Silver medal – second place	2020 Guadalajara	–57 kg
Bronze medal – third place	2014 Guayaquil	–63 kg
Bronze medal – third place	2015 Edmonton	–63 kg

Leilani Akiyama (born February 21, 1987) is an American judoka. She competed at the World Judo Championships in 2014, 2015, 2017 and 2018.

In 2020, she won the silver medal in the women's 57 kg event at the Pan American Judo Championships held in Guadalajara, Mexico.
