= Judo at the 2019 Pan American Games – Men's 66 kg =

Men's 66 kg at the 2019 Pan American Games
- Venue: Polideportivo 3
- Dates: August 9
- Competitors: 10 from 10 nations

Medalists
Gold medal	Wander Mateo	Dominican Republic
Silver medal	Daniel Cargnin	Brazil
Bronze medal	Ricardo Valderrama	Venezuela
Bronze medal	Osniel Solís	Cuba

The men's 66 kg competition of the judo events at the 2019 Pan American Games in Lima, Peru, was held on August 9 at the Polideportivo 3.

== Participants by country ==
=== Bracket ===
Round of 16
Minoru Tamashiro (ARG)	00
Jorge González (COL)	11
Nabor Castillo (MEX)	01
Ryan Vargas (USA)	00S1

Quarter Finals
Osniel Solís (CUB)	01
Jorge González (COL)	00
Juan Postigos (PER)	00S1
Wander Mateo (DOM)	10
Daniel Cargnin (BRA)	10S2
Nabor Castillo (MEX)	00S3
Ricardo Valderrama (VEN)
Bye

Semi Finals
Osniel Solís (CUB)	00
Wander Mateo (DOM)	01S2
Daniel Cargnin (BRA)	10S2
Ricardo Valderrama (VEN)	00

Final
Wander Mateo (DOM)	01S2
Daniel Cargnin (BRA)	00S1

=== Repechage round ===
Two bronze medals were awarded.

Repechage		Bronze medal
Jorge González (COL)	00S1
Juan Postigos (PER)	01S1	Juan Postigos (PER)	00S2
		Ricardo Valderrama (VEN)	10S1

Repechage	Bronze medal
Nabor Castillo (MEX)
Bye	Nabor Castillo (MEX)	00S2
	Osniel Solís (CUB)	10S1

== Results ==
All times are local (UTC−5)
