= David Moura =

Brazilian judoka (born 1987)

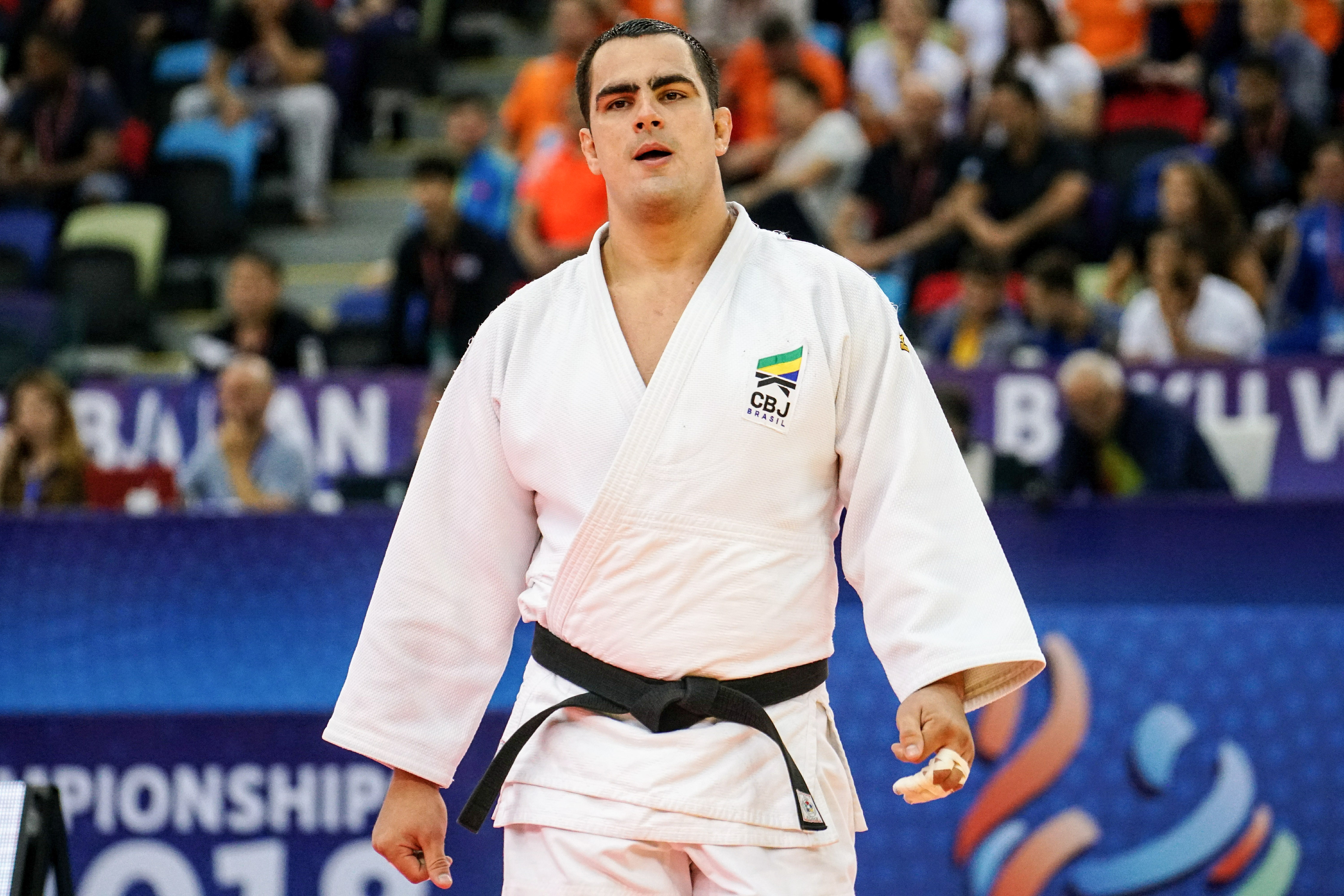

Personal information
- Full name: David Moura Pereira da Silva
- Born: 24 August 1987 (age 38) Cuiabá, Brazil
- Occupation: Judoka
- Height: 1.92 m (6 ft 4 in)

Sport
- Country: Brazil
- Sport: Judo
- Weight class: +100 kg

Achievements and titles
- World Champ.: (silver) (2017)
- Pan American Champ.: (2015)
Medal record
Men's judo
Representing Brazil
World Championships
Silver medal – second place	2017 Budapest	+100 kg
Silver medal – second place	2017 Budapest	Mixed team
Bronze medal – third place	2019 Tokyo	Mixed team
Bronze medal – third place	2021 Budapest	Mixed team
Pan American Games
Gold medal – first place	2015 Toronto	+100 kg
Bronze medal – third place	2019 Lima	+100 kg
Pan American Championships
Gold medal – first place	2015 Edmonton	+100 kg
Gold medal – first place	2020 Guadalajara	Mixed team
Silver medal – second place	2016 Havana	+100 kg
Silver medal – second place	2019 Lima	+100 kg
Silver medal – second place	2021 Guadalajara	+100 kg
Bronze medal – third place	2014 Guayaquil	+100 kg
Bronze medal – third place	2020 Guadalajara	+100 kg
World Masters
Silver medal – second place	2017 Saint Petersburg	+100 kg
Bronze medal – third place	2018 Guangzhou	+100 kg
IJF Grand Slam
Gold medal – first place	2017 Ekaterinburg	+100 kg
Silver medal – second place	2013 Baku	+100 kg
Silver medal – second place	2014 Paris	+100 kg
Silver medal – second place	2015 Paris	+100 kg
Silver medal – second place	2019 Brasilia	+100 kg
Bronze medal – third place	2012 Rio de Janeiro	+100 kg
Bronze medal – third place	2016 Paris	+100 kg
Bronze medal – third place	2016 Baku	+100 kg
Bronze medal – third place	2016 Abu Dhabi	+100 kg
Bronze medal – third place	2017 Tokyo	+100 kg
Bronze medal – third place	2019 Ekaterinburg	+100 kg
Bronze medal – third place	2021 Kazan	+100 kg
IJF Grand Prix
Gold medal – first place	2017 Cancún	+100 kg
Silver medal – second place	2012 Abu Dhabi	+100 kg
Bronze medal – third place	2013 Düsseldorf	+100 kg
Bronze medal – third place	2013 Almaty	+100 kg
Bronze medal – third place	2013 Tashkent	+100 kg
Bronze medal – third place	2017 Tbilisi	+100 kg
Bronze medal – third place	2019 Montreal	+100 kg
Summer Universiade
Bronze medal – third place	2011 Shenzhen	Open
Bronze medal – third place	2013 Kazan	Open
Bronze medal – third place	2013 Kazan	Team

Profile at external databases
- IJF: 2620
- JudoInside.com: 77369
- Updated on 26 June 2023

David Moura Pereira da Silva (born 24 August 1987) is a Brazilian judoka. He won a silver medal at the 2017 World Judo Championships, was the gold medalist at the 2015 Pan American Games, the 2015 Pan American Judo Championships and ended 2017 as leader of the world rankings.

He is the nephew of fellow judo champion Luiz Virgilio Castro de Moura.

== Career ==
At the 2011 Summer Universiade, Moura won a bronze medal in the Open category.

He won his first Grand Slam (the tournament that gives the most points in the judo ranking after the Olympic Games, the World Championships and the World Masters) medal at the 2012 Judo Grand Slam Rio de Janeiro, where he won a bronze medal.

At the 2013 Judo Grand Slam Baku, Moura reached the final, against fellow Brazilian Walter Santos, taking silver.

At the 2013 Summer Universiade, Moura won his second bronze medal in a row in the Open category.

At the 2014 Judo Grand Slam Paris, Moura reached the final, losing to Japanese Ryu Shichinohe, taking silver.

At the 2014 Pan American Judo Championships, Moura won a bronze medal in the Heavyweight (+100 kg) category.

At the 2014 World Judo Championships, Moura reached the semifinals, but lost two fights in a row and ended up without a medal, finishing in 5th place.

2015 was one of the best years of Moura's career. In April, participating in the 2015 Pan American Judo Championships in Canada, he defeated his main rival in Brazil, Rafael Silva (who took away his Olympic place in 2012, 2016 and 2020) and obtained the gold medal (it was the only time in his career that he managed to become champion of this tournament). In June, Rafael Silva suffered an injury and was cut from the Pan American Games, giving his place to Moura. At this time, Moura was number 12 in the world rankings in the heavyweight category (+100 kg). At the 2015 Pan American Games, Moura won his biggest title when he won gold in the Men's +100 kg category, another gold that he did not repeat later in his career. Moura also participated at the 2015 World Judo Championships, where he was eliminated in the second round by the Japanese Ryu Shichinohe, world runner-up in 2014, who ended up being world runner-up again this year. In October, he also won the silver medal at the 2015 Judo Grand Slam Paris.

At the 2016 Pan American Judo Championships, Moura made the second final in a row against Rafael Silva, where the fight went to the golden score, with Silva winning; Moura got silver.

In 2016, Moura also won three bronzes at the Grand Slams in Paris, Baku and Abu Dhabi.

2017 was the best year of Moura's career. In May 2017, Moura won one of his biggest singles titles when he became 2017 Judo Grand Slam Ekaterinburg champion. At the 2017 World Judo Championships, Moura had his best campaign at the world championships, reaching the final and losing only to the legendary judoka Teddy Riner, obtaining the silver medal. In the mixed team modality, he won another silver medal representing Brazil. In early December, he won bronze at the 2017 Judo Grand Slam Tokyo and, in the last competition of the year, the 2017 Judo World Masters (the World Masters is the second most important competition on the judo circuit after the World Championships), he obtained a silver medal. Moura ended 2017 as leader of the world rankings in his category.

At the 2018 World Judo Championships, Moura did not have a good campaign, being eliminated on his debut.

At the 2018 Judo World Masters in Guangzhou, Moura won the bronze medal.

At the 2019 Judo Grand Slam Ekaterinburg, Moura won a bronze medal.

At the 2019 Pan American Judo Championships held in Lima, Peru, in April, in another Brazilian final with Moura facing Rafael Silva for the 3rd time in the finals of this tournament, Silva obtained his fifth gold in Pan American Judo Championships and Moura, his second silver.

At the 2019 Pan American Games, in August, Moura, third in the world rankings in his category, ended up being defeated by Andy Granda (who would later become world champion), obtaining bronze.

At the 2019 World Judo Championships, which took place right after the Pan, Moura reached the quarterfinals, losing to Korean Kim Min-jong. In the mixed team modality, he won a bronze medal representing Brazil.

At the 2019 Judo Grand Slam Brasília, Moura won a silver medal.

At the 2020 Pan American Judo Championships, Moura won a bronze medal in the +100 kg category and another gold medal for the Brazilian team.

In 2021, he competed in the men's +100 kg event at the 2021 Judo World Masters held in Doha, Qatar.

At the 2021 Pan American Judo Championships held in Guadalajara, Mexico, in another Brazilian final with Moura (then 11th in the world) facing Rafael Silva (then 10th in the world) for the 4th time in the finals of this tournament, Silva obtained his sixth gold in Pan American Judo Championships, and Moura, his third silver medal.

At the 2021 Judo Grand Slam Kazan, Moura won a bronze medal.

At the 2021 World Judo Championships, Moura won the first fight, but was eliminated in the round of 16. In the mixed team modality, he won a bronze medal representing Brazil.

At the end of 2021, at the age of 34, Moura announced his retirement from professional sport to dedicate himself to the Instituto Reação social project. In April 2022, he took on the position of assistant secretary of sports for the state of Mato Grosso.
