= 2014 Pan American Judo Championships =

Judo competition

2014 Judo Pan American Judo Championships
- Venue: Guayaquil
- Location: Guayaquil, Ecuador
- Dates: 24–26 April 2014
- Competitors: 415 from 24 nations

Competition at external databases
- Links: IJF • JudoInside

The 2014 Pan American Judo Championships was held in Guayaquil, Ecuador from April 24–26, 2014.

== Medal table ==
* Host nation (Ecuador)

Rank	Nation	Gold	Silver	Bronze	Total
1	Brazil (BRA)	7	4	5	16
2	Cuba (CUB)	7	4	4	15
3	United States (USA)	1	0	4	5
4	Colombia (COL)	1	0	0	1
5	Canada (CAN)	0	3	2	5
6	Ecuador (ECU)*	0	1	6	7
7	Mexico (MEX)	0	1	4	5
8	Dominican Republic (DOM)	0	1	2	3
8	Venezuela (VEN)	0	1	2	3
10	Peru (PER)	0	1	0	1
11	Argentina (ARG)	0	0	2	2
12	Puerto Rico (PUR)	0	0	1	1
Totals (12 entries)		16	16	32	64

== Results ==
=== Men's events ===
Event	Gold	Silver	Bronze
Super extra-lightweight (55 kg)	Yandry Torres; Cuba (CUB)	Jesús Agüero; Venezuela (VEN)	Armando Maita; Venezuela (VEN)
Super extra-lightweight (55 kg)	Yandry Torres; Cuba (CUB)	Jesús Agüero; Venezuela (VEN)	Cristian Toala; Ecuador (ECU)
Extra-lightweight (60 kg)	Felipe Kitadai; Brazil (BRA)	Nabor Castillo; Mexico (MEX)	Janier Peña; Cuba (CUB)
Extra-lightweight (60 kg)	Felipe Kitadai; Brazil (BRA)	Nabor Castillo; Mexico (MEX)	Lenin Preciado; Ecuador (ECU)
Half-lightweight (66 kg)	Charles Chibana; Brazil (BRA)	Alonso Wong; Peru (PER)	Wander Mateo; Dominican Republic (DOM)
Half-lightweight (66 kg)	Charles Chibana; Brazil (BRA)	Alonso Wong; Peru (PER)	Gilberto Armas; Cuba (CUB)
Lightweight (73 kg)	Alex Pombo; Brazil (BRA)	Magdiel Estrada; Cuba (CUB)	Fernando Ibáñez; Ecuador (ECU)
Lightweight (73 kg)	Alex Pombo; Brazil (BRA)	Magdiel Estrada; Cuba (CUB)	Nicholas Delpopolo; United States (USA)
Half-middleweight (81 kg)	Victor Penalber; Brazil (BRA)	Antoine Valois-Fortier; Canada (CAN)	Travis Stevens; United States (USA)
Half-middleweight (81 kg)	Victor Penalber; Brazil (BRA)	Antoine Valois-Fortier; Canada (CAN)	Iván Felipe Silva Morales; Cuba (CUB)
Middleweight (90 kg)	Tiago Camilo; Brazil (BRA)	Andy Granda; Cuba (CUB)	Cristian Gomera; Dominican Republic (DOM)
Middleweight (90 kg)	Tiago Camilo; Brazil (BRA)	Andy Granda; Cuba (CUB)	Jacob Larsen; United States (USA)
Half-heavyweight (100 kg)	José Armenteros; Cuba (CUB)	Luciano Corrêa; Brazil (BRA)	Rafael Buzacarini; Brazil (BRA)
Half-heavyweight (100 kg)	José Armenteros; Cuba (CUB)	Luciano Corrêa; Brazil (BRA)	Dilyaver Sheykhislyamov; Canada (CAN)
Heavyweight (+100 kg)	Rafael Silva; Brazil (BRA)	Óscar Brayson; Cuba (CUB)	David Moura; Brazil (BRA)
Heavyweight (+100 kg)	Rafael Silva; Brazil (BRA)	Óscar Brayson; Cuba (CUB)	Pedro Pineda; Venezuela (VEN)

=== Women's events ===
Event	Gold	Silver	Bronze
Super extra-lightweight (44 kg)	Dayaris Mestre Alvarez; Cuba (CUB)	Estefanía Soriano; Dominican Republic (DOM)	Sandra Sánchez; Mexico (MEX)
Super extra-lightweight (44 kg)	Dayaris Mestre Alvarez; Cuba (CUB)	Estefanía Soriano; Dominican Republic (DOM)	Mónica Heredia; Ecuador (ECU)
Extra-lightweight (48 kg)	Maria Celia Laborde; Cuba (CUB)	Sarah Menezes; Brazil (BRA)	Paula Pareto; Argentina (ARG)
Extra-lightweight (48 kg)	Maria Celia Laborde; Cuba (CUB)	Sarah Menezes; Brazil (BRA)	Edna Carrillo; Mexico (MEX)
Half-lightweight (52 kg)	Érika Miranda; Brazil (BRA)	Yanet Bermoy; Cuba (CUB)	Oritia González; Argentina (ARG)
Half-lightweight (52 kg)	Érika Miranda; Brazil (BRA)	Yanet Bermoy; Cuba (CUB)	Mónica Hernández; Mexico (MEX)
Lightweight (57 kg)	Marti Malloy; United States (USA)	Rafaela Silva; Brazil (BRA)	Ketleyn Quadros; Brazil (BRA)
Lightweight (57 kg)	Marti Malloy; United States (USA)	Rafaela Silva; Brazil (BRA)	Aliuska Ojeda; Cuba (CUB)
Half-middleweight (63 kg)	Maricet Espinosa; Cuba (CUB)	Estefania García; Ecuador (ECU)	Leilani Akiyama; United States (USA)
Half-middleweight (63 kg)	Maricet Espinosa; Cuba (CUB)	Estefania García; Ecuador (ECU)	Andrea Gutiérrez; Mexico (MEX)
Middleweight (70 kg)	Yuri Alvear; Colombia (COL)	Kelita Zupancic; Canada (CAN)	Vanessa Chalá; Ecuador (ECU)
Middleweight (70 kg)	Yuri Alvear; Colombia (COL)	Kelita Zupancic; Canada (CAN)	María Pérez; Puerto Rico (PUR)
Half-heavyweight (78 kg)	Yalennis Castillo; Cuba (CUB)	Catherine Roberge; Canada (CAN)	Ana Laura Portuondo-Isasi; Canada (CAN)
Half-heavyweight (78 kg)	Yalennis Castillo; Cuba (CUB)	Catherine Roberge; Canada (CAN)	Samanta Soares; Brazil (BRA)
Heavyweight (+78 kg)	Idalys Ortiz; Cuba (CUB)	Maria Suelen Altheman; Brazil (BRA)	Rochele Nunes; Brazil (BRA)
Heavyweight (+78 kg)	Idalys Ortiz; Cuba (CUB)	Maria Suelen Altheman; Brazil (BRA)	Marlín Viveros; Ecuador (ECU)
