= Judo at the 2015 Pan American Games – Men's +100 kg =

Men's +100 kg at the 2015 Pan American Games
- Venue: Mississauga Sports Centre
- Dates: July 14
- Competitors: 9 from 9 nations

Medalists
Gold medal	David Moura	Brazil
Silver medal	Freddy Figueroa	Ecuador
Bronze medal	Alex García Mendoza	Cuba
Bronze medal	Jose Cuevas	Mexico

The men's +100 kg competition of the judo events at the 2015 Pan American Games in Toronto, Canada, was held on July 14 at the Mississauga Sports Centre.

== Schedule ==
All times are Central Standard Time (UTC-6).

Date	Time	Round
July 14, 2015	15:42	Preliminary bout
July 14, 2015	15:14	Quarterfinals
July 14, 2015	16:17	Repechage
July 14, 2015	17:34	Semifinals
July 14, 2015	21:23	Bronze medal matches
July 14, 2015	21:37	Final

== Results ==
Legend

- 1st number = Ippon
- 2nd number = Waza-ari
- 3rd number = Yuko

=== Bracket ===
Preliminaries
Ramon Pileta (HON)	100
Martin Rygielski (CAN)	000S1

Quarter Finals
David Moura (BRA)	100
Joshua Santos (PER)	000
Pedro Pineda (VEN)	100S3
Ramon Pileta (HON)	000S4
Freddy Figueroa (ECU)	011S1
Akbar Iminov (USA)	000S3
Jose Cuevas (MEX)	000S3
Alex García Mendoza (CUB)	011

Semi Finals
David Moura (BRA)	000
Pedro Pineda (VEN)	000S4
Freddy Figueroa (ECU)	100
Alex García Mendoza (CUB)	000S1

Final
David Moura (BRA)	100
Freddy Figueroa (ECU)	000

=== Repechage round ===
Two bronze medals were awarded.

Repechage		Bronze medal
Joshua Santos (PER)	000S1
Ramon Pileta (HON)	100S1	Ramon Pileta (HON)	000S4
		Alex García Mendoza (CUB)	100S1

Repechage		Bronze medal
Akbar Iminov (USA)	000S2
Jose Cuevas (MEX)	000S1	Jose Cuevas (MEX)	100S3
		Pedro Pineda (VEN)	000S4
