= 2018 Pan American Judo Championships =

Judo competition

2018 Judo Pan American Judo Championships
- Venue: San José
- Location: San José, Costa Rica
- Dates: 20–21 April 2018
- Competitors: 222 from 25 nations

Competition at external databases
- Links: IJF • JudoInside

The 2018 Pan American Judo Championships was held in San José, Costa Rica from 20 to 21 April 2018.

== Results ==
=== Men's events ===
Event	Gold	Silver	Bronze
Extra-lightweight (60 kg)	Lenin Preciado; Ecuador	Roberto Almenares; Cuba	Adonis Diaz; United States
Extra-lightweight (60 kg)	Lenin Preciado; Ecuador	Roberto Almenares; Cuba	Yandry Torres; Cuba
Half-lightweight (66 kg)	Osniel Solís; Cuba	Daniel Cargnin; Brazil	Ricardo Valderrama; Venezuela
Half-lightweight (66 kg)	Osniel Solís; Cuba	Daniel Cargnin; Brazil	Ryan Vargas; United States
Lightweight (73 kg)	Antoine Bouchard; Canada	Magdiel Estrada; Cuba	Nicholas Delpopolo; United States
Lightweight (73 kg)	Antoine Bouchard; Canada	Magdiel Estrada; Cuba	Alonso Wong; Peru
Half-middleweight (81 kg)	Antoine Valois-Fortier; Canada	Medickson del Orbe; Dominican Republic	Adrián Gandía; Puerto Rico
Half-middleweight (81 kg)	Antoine Valois-Fortier; Canada	Medickson del Orbe; Dominican Republic	Eduardo Yudi Santos; Brazil
Middleweight (90 kg)	Iván Felipe Silva Morales; Cuba	Asley González; Cuba	Colton Brown; United States
Middleweight (90 kg)	Iván Felipe Silva Morales; Cuba	Asley González; Cuba	Robert Florentino; Dominican Republic
Half-heavyweight (100 kg)	Leonardo Gonçalves; Brazil	Lewis Medina; Dominican Republic	José Armenteros; Cuba
Half-heavyweight (100 kg)	Leonardo Gonçalves; Brazil	Lewis Medina; Dominican Republic	L.A. Smith III; United States
Heavyweight (+100 kg)	Freddy Figueroa; Ecuador	Héctor Campos; Argentina	Andy Granda; Cuba
Heavyweight (+100 kg)	Freddy Figueroa; Ecuador	Héctor Campos; Argentina	Francisco Solis; Chile

=== Women's events ===
Event	Gold	Silver	Bronze
Extra-lightweight (48 kg)	Paula Pareto; Argentina	Keisy Perafán; Argentina	Luz Álvarez; Colombia
Extra-lightweight (48 kg)	Paula Pareto; Argentina	Keisy Perafán; Argentina	Edna Carrillo; Mexico
Half-lightweight (52 kg)	Jéssica Pereira; Brazil	Angelica Delgado; United States	Ecaterina Guica; Canada
Half-lightweight (52 kg)	Jéssica Pereira; Brazil	Angelica Delgado; United States	Luz Olvera; Mexico
Lightweight (57 kg)	Christa Deguchi; Canada	Tamires Crude; Brazil	Jessica Klimkait; Canada
Lightweight (57 kg)	Christa Deguchi; Canada	Tamires Crude; Brazil	Miryam Roper; Panama
Half-middleweight (63 kg)	Maylín del Toro Carvajal; Cuba	Catherine Beauchemin-Pinard; Canada	Anriquelis Barrios; Venezuela
Half-middleweight (63 kg)	Maylín del Toro Carvajal; Cuba	Catherine Beauchemin-Pinard; Canada	Alexia Castilhos; Brazil
Middleweight (70 kg)	Yuri Alvear; Colombia	Elvismar Rodríguez; Venezuela	Onix Cortés; Cuba
Middleweight (70 kg)	Yuri Alvear; Colombia	Elvismar Rodríguez; Venezuela	Kelita Zupancic; Canada
Half-heavyweight (78 kg)	Kaliema Antomarchi; Cuba	Karen León; Venezuela	Diana Brenes; Costa Rica
Half-heavyweight (78 kg)	Kaliema Antomarchi; Cuba	Karen León; Venezuela	Vanessa Chalá; Ecuador
Heavyweight (+78 kg)	Idalys Ortiz; Cuba	Beatriz Souza; Brazil	

=== Mixed event ===
Event	Gold	Silver	Bronze
Mixed team	Cuba	Brazil	Peru
Mixed team	Cuba	Brazil	Venezuela

== Medal table ==
Key

The host country is highlighted

Rank	Nation	Gold	Silver	Bronze	Total
1	Cuba (CUB)	6	3	4	13
2	Canada (CAN)	3	1	3	7
3	Brazil (BRA)	2	4	2	8
4	Ecuador (ECU)	2	0	1	3
5	Argentina (ARG)	1	2	0	3
6	Colombia (COL)	1	0	1	2
7	Venezuela (VEN)	0	2	3	5
8	Dominican Republic (DOM)	0	2	1	3
9	United States (USA)	0	1	6	7
10	Mexico (MEX)	0	0	2	2
10	Peru (PER)	0	0	2	2
12	Chile (CHI)	0	0	1	1
12	Costa Rica (CRC)*	0	0	1	1
12	Panama (PAN)	0	0	1	1
12	Puerto Rico (PUR)	0	0	1	1
Totals (15 entries)		15	15	29	59
