= Nefeli Papadakis =

American judoka (born 1998)

Personal information
- Born: October 2, 1998 (age 27)
- Occupation: Judoka

Sport
- Country: United States
- Sport: Judo
- Weight class: 78 kg
Medal record
Women's judo
Representing United States
Pan American Championships
Silver medal – second place	2020 Guadalajara	–78 kg
Bronze medal – third place	2019 Lima	–78 kg
Bronze medal – third place	2021 Guadalajara	–78 kg

Profile at external databases
- IJF: 13312
- JudoInside.com: 31891
- Updated on 3 November 2021

Nefeli Papadakis (born October 2, 1998) is an American judoka. In 2020, she won the silver medal in the women's 78 kg event at the 2020 Pan American Judo Championships held in Guadalajara, Mexico. She also won a bronze medal in this event, both in 2019 and in 2021.

In 2019, she competed in the women's 78 kg event at the 2019 Pan American Games held in Lima, Peru. In that same year, she also competed in the women's 78 kg event at the 2019 World Judo Championships held in Tokyo, Japan.

In 2021, she competed in the women's 78 kg event at the 2021 Judo World Masters held in Doha, Qatar. She competed in the women's 78 kg event at the 2020 Summer Olympics in Tokyo, Japan. She was eliminated in her first match by Yoon Hyun-ji of South Korea.

== Achievements ==
Year	Tournament	Place	Weight class
2019	Pan American Championships	3rd	–78 kg
2020	Pan American Championships	2nd	–78 kg
2021	Pan American Championships	3rd	–78 kg
