= Eduardo Yudy Santos =

Brazilian judoka (born 1994)

Personal information
- Nationality: Brazilian
- Born: 25 October 1994 (age 31) Ibaraki, Japan
- Occupation: Judoka

Sport
- Country: Brazil
- Sport: Judo
- Weight class: –81 kg

Achievements and titles
- Olympic Games: R32 (2020)
- World Champ.: R16 (2018, 2021, 2023)
- Pan American Champ.: (gold) (2017)
Medal record
Men's judo
Representing Brazil
World Championships
Bronze medal – third place	2019 Tokyo	Mixed team
Bronze medal – third place	2021 Budapest	Mixed team
Pan American Games
Gold medal – first place	2019 Lima	‍–‍81 kg
Pan American Championships
Gold medal – first place	2017 Panama City	‍–‍81 kg
Silver medal – second place	2020 Guadalajara	‍–‍81 kg
Bronze medal – third place	2018 San José	‍–‍81 kg
Bronze medal – third place	2019 Lima	‍–‍81 kg
IJF Grand Prix
Bronze medal – third place	2018 Tunis	‍–‍81 kg
Bronze medal – third place	2019 Perth	‍–‍81 kg
Bronze medal – third place	2020 Tel Aviv	‍–‍81 kg
Pan American Junior Championships
Silver medal – second place	2014 San Salvador	‍–‍81 kg

Profile at external databases
- IJF: 17102
- JudoInside.com: 81633
- Updated on 21 May 2023

Eduardo Yudy Santos (born 25 October 1994) is a Brazilian judoka.

He won a medal at the 2019 World Judo Championships.

In 2020, he won the silver medal in the men's 81 kg event at the 2020 Pan American Judo Championships held in Guadalajara, Mexico.

He represented Brazil at the 2020 Summer Olympics.
