= Judo at the 2019 Pan American Games – Men's 81 kg =

Men's 81 kg at the 2019 Pan American Games
- Venue: Polideportivo 3
- Dates: August 10
- Competitors: 9 from 9 nations

Medalists
Gold medal	Eduardo Yudy	Brazil
Silver medal	Medickson del Orbe	Dominican Republic
Bronze medal	Adrián Gandía	Puerto Rico
Bronze medal	Jorge Martínez	Cuba

The men's 81 kg competition of the judo events at the 2019 Pan American Games in Lima, Peru, was held on August 10 at the Polideportivo 3.

== Results ==
All times are local (UTC−5)

=== Bracket ===
Round of 16
Samuel Ayala (MEX)	10S2
Luis Ángeles Sotelo (PER)	00S1

Quarter Finals
Medickson del Orbe (DOM)	01S1
Samuel Ayala (MEX)	00S2
Adrián Gandía (PUR)	00
Jorge Martínez (CUB)	01S1
Eduardo Yudy (BRA)	01
Luis Vega (ARG)	00S2
Noel Peña (VEN)	00S2
Jack Hatton (USA)	10S1

Semi Finals
Medickson del Orbe (DOM)	01S1
Jorge Martínez (CUB)	00
Eduardo Yudy (BRA)	10
Jack Hatton (USA)	00S2

Final
Medickson del Orbe (DOM)	00
Eduardo Yudy (BRA)	10

=== Repechage round ===
Two bronze medals were awarded.

Repechage		Bronze medal
Samuel Ayala (MEX)	00S2
Adrián Gandía (PUR)	01S1	Adrián Gandía (PUR)	10S1
		Jack Hatton (USA)	00S3

Repechage		Bronze medal
Luis Vega (ARG)	01
Noel Peña (VEN)	10	Noel Peña (VEN)	01S1
		Jorge Martínez (CUB)	11S1
