= Judo at the 2023 Pan American Games – Men's 73 kg =

Judo Men's 73 kg at the 2023 Pan American Games
- Venue: Contact Sports Center
- Location: Santiago, Chile
- Date: October 29
- Competitors: 11 from 10 nations
- Website: Official website

Medalists
| gold medal | Gabriel Falcão (1st title) | Brazil |
| silver medal | Daniel Cargnin | Brazil |
| bronze medal | Antoine Bouchard | Canada |
| bronze medal | Gilberto Cardoso | Mexico |

Competition at external databases
- Links: IJF

The men's 73 kg competition of the judo events at the 2023 Pan American Games was held on October 29 at the Contact Sports Center (Centro de Entrenamiento de los Deportes de Contacto) in Santiago, Chile. A total of 11 athletes from 10 NOC's competed.

== Schedule ==
All times are local (UTC−3)

| Date | Time | Event |
|---|---|---|
| Sunday, 29 October 2023 | 10:00 | Elimination round of 16 |
| Sunday, 29 October 2023 | 10:00 | Quarterfinals |
| Sunday, 29 October 2023 | 11:00 | Repechage |
| Sunday, 29 October 2023 | 11:00 | Semifinals |
| Sunday, 29 October 2023 | 15:00 | Finals |

== Results ==
=== Main Bracket ===
Round of 16
Matteo Etchechury (ARG) | 00 (yellow card)
Daniel Cargnin (BRA) | 10 (yellow card)
Antonio Tornal (DOM) | 01 (yellow card)
Sergio Mattey (VEN) | 00
~~Jack Yonezuka (USA)~~ | 00 (DNS)
Gabriel Falcão (BRA) | w/o

Quarter-finals
Antoine Bouchard (CAN) | 00
Daniel Cargnin (BRA) | 01 (yellow card)
Andrés Sandoval (COL) | 10 (yellow card)
Juan Pablo Vega (CHI) | 00
Magdiel Estrada (CUB) | 00
Antonio Tornal (DOM) | 01
Gilberto Cardoso (MEX) | 00
Gabriel Falcão (BRA) | 01

Semi-finals
Daniel Cargnin (BRA) | 10 (yellow card)
Andrés Sandoval (COL) | 00
Antonio Tornal (DOM) | 00
Gabriel Falcão (BRA) | 10 (yellow card)

Gold medal contest
Daniel Cargnin (BRA) | 00 (DNS)
Gabriel Falcão (BRA) | w/o

=== Repechage ===
Repechage
Antoine Bouchard (CAN) | 10
Juan Pablo Vega (CHI) | 00
Magdiel Estrada (CUB) | 00
Gilberto Cardoso (MEX) | 11 (yellow card)

Bronze medal contests
Antoine Bouchard (CAN) | 10 (yellow card)
Antonio Tornal (DOM) | 00
Gilberto Cardoso (MEX) | 10
Andrés Sandoval (COL) | 00
