= Nathalia Brigida =

Brazilian judoka (born 1993)

Personal information
- Nationality: Brazilian
- Born: 28 February 1993 (age 33) Atibaia, São Paulo
- Occupation: Judoka

Sport
- Country: Brazil
- Sport: Judo
- Weight class: –48 kg

Achievements and titles
- World Champ.: 5th (2015)
- Pan American Champ.: (2019)
Medal record
Women's judo
Representing Brazil
Pan American Games
Bronze medal – third place	2015 Toronto	‍–‍48 kg
Pan American Championships
Silver medal – second place	2019 Lima	‍–‍48 kg
Bronze medal – third place	2016 Havana	‍–‍48 kg
Bronze medal – third place	2021 Guadalajara	‍–‍48 kg
IJF Grand Slam
Bronze medal – third place	2015 Baku	‍–‍48 kg
Bronze medal – third place	2016 Abu Dhabi	‍–‍48 kg
Bronze medal – third place	2019 Düsseldorf	‍–‍48 kg
IJF Grand Prix
Silver medal – second place	2013 Miami	‍–‍48 kg
Silver medal – second place	2014 Astana	‍–‍48 kg
Silver medal – second place	2015 Samsun	‍–‍48 kg
Bronze medal – third place	2016 Almaty	‍–‍48 kg
Bronze medal – third place	2019 Tel Aviv	‍–‍48 kg
Bronze medal – third place	2019 Tbilisi	‍–‍48 kg
World Juniors Championships
Bronze medal – third place	2010 Agadir	‍–‍48 kg
Pan American Junior Championships
Gold medal – first place	2010 Buena Vista	‍–‍48 kg

Profile at external databases
- IJF: 3334
- JudoInside.com: 58346
- Updated on 21 May 2023

Nathalia Brigida (born 28 February 1993) is a Brazilian judoka.

She is the bronze medallist of the 2015 Pan American Games in the ‍–‍48 kg category.
