= Jeferson Santos Junior =

Brazilian judoka (born 1999)

Personal information
- Nickname: Juninho Bomba
- Nationality: Brazilian
- Born: 19 April 1999 (age 27) São José dos Campos
- Height: 1.68
- Weight: 73 kg (161 lb)

Sport
- Country: Brazil
- Sport: Judo
- Event: –73 kg
Medal record
World Championships
Bronze medal – third place	2019 Tokyo	Mixed team
Pan American Games
Bronze medal – third place	2019 Lima	–73 kg

Jeferson Santos Junior (born 19 April 1999) is a Brazilian judoka.

He won a medal at the 2019 World Judo Championships.
