= Judo at the 2019 Pan American Games – Men's 73 kg =

Men's 73 kg at the 2019 Pan American Games
- Venue: Polideportivo 3
- Dates: August 9
- Competitors: 10 from 10 nations

Medalists
Gold medal	Magdiel Estrada	Cuba
Silver medal	Alonso Wong	Peru
Bronze medal	Jeferson Santos Junior	Brazil
Bronze medal	Nicholas Delpopolo	United States

The men's 73 kg competition of the judo events at the 2019 Pan American Games in Lima, Peru, was held on August 9 at the Polideportivo 3.

== Results ==
All times are local (UTC−5)

=== Bracket ===
Round of 16
Jeffrey Ruiz (PUR)	00
Leider Navarro (COL)	01S2
Bradley Langlois (CAN)	11
Philippe Metellus (HAI)	00S1

Quarter Finals
Magdiel Estrada (CUB)	10S1
Leider Navarro (COL)	00S1
Sergio Mattey (VEN)	01S2
Jeferson Santos (BRA)	00
Alonso Wong (PER)	10
Bradley Langlois (CAN)	00S3
Eduardo Araújo (MEX)	10
Nicholas Delpopolo (USA)	00

Semi Finals
Magdiel Estrada (CUB)	10S2
Sergio Mattey (VEN)	00S1
Alonso Wong (PER)	10S1
Eduardo Araújo (MEX)	00S3

Final
Magdiel Estrada (CUB)	10S1
Alonso Wong (PER)	00S2

=== Repechage round ===
Two bronze medals were awarded.

Repechage		Bronze medal
Leider Navarro (COL)	00S3
Jeferson Santos (BRA)	10S1	Jeferson Santos (BRA)	10S1
		Eduardo Araújo (MEX)	00

Repechage		Bronze medal
Bradley Langlois (CAN)	00S3
Nicholas Delpopolo (USA)	10	Nicholas Delpopolo (USA)	01S1
		Sergio Mattey (VEN)	00S1
