= Samanta Soares =

Brazilian judoka (born 1993)

Personal information
- Nationality: Brazilian
- Born: 16 July 1993 (age 32) São Paulo
- Occupation: Judoka
- Height: 165 cm (5 ft 5 in)

Sport
- Country: Brazil
- Sport: Judo
- Weight class: ‍–‍78 kg

Achievements and titles
- World Champ.: R32 (2017)
- Pan American Champ.: (2017)
Medal record
Women's judo
Representing Brazil
Pan American Games
Gold medal – first place	2023 Santiago	‍–‍78 kg
Silver medal – second place	2023 Santiago	Mixed team
Pan American Championships
Gold medal – first place	2017 Panama City	‍–‍78 kg
Bronze medal – third place	2014 Guayaquil	‍–‍78 kg
IJF Grand Slam
Silver medal – second place	2012 Rio de Janeiro	‍–‍78 kg
Bronze medal – third place	2016 Abu Dhabi	‍–‍78 kg
IJF Grand Prix
Bronze medal – third place	2018 Hohhot	‍–‍78 kg
Bronze medal – third place	2018 Cancún	‍–‍78 kg
Bronze medal – third place	2018 The Hague	‍–‍78 kg
World Juniors Championships
Silver medal – second place	2013 Ljubljana	‍–‍78 kg
World Cadets Championships
Bronze medal – third place	2009 Budapest	+70 kg

Profile at external databases
- IJF: 2643
- JudoInside.com: 57765
- Updated on 1 November 2023

Samanta de Almeida Batista Soares (born 16 July 1993 in São Paulo) is a Brazilian judoka.

She is the silver medallist of the 2018 Judo Grand Prix The Hague in the ‍–‍78 kg category.
