= Diana Brenes =

Costa Rican judoka (born 1997)

Personal information
- Born: 16 February 1997 (age 29)
- Occupation: Judoka

Sport
- Country: Costa Rica
- Sport: Judo
- Weight class: ‍–‍78 kg

Achievements and titles
- World Champ.: R32 (2017, 2018, 2019)
- Pan American Champ.: (2017, 2018, 2020)
Medal record
Women's judo
Representing Costa Rica
Pan American Games
Bronze medal – third place	2019 Lima	‍–‍78 kg
Pan American Championships
Bronze medal – third place	2017 Panama City	‍–‍78 kg
Bronze medal – third place	2018 San José	‍–‍78 kg
Bronze medal – third place	2020 Guadalajara	‍–‍78 kg
Pan American Junior Championships
Gold medal – first place	2014 San Salvador	‍–‍70 kg
Silver medal – second place	2016 Cordoba	‍–‍78 kg
Silver medal – second place	2017 Cancún	‍–‍78 kg
Pan American Cadet Championships
Gold medal – first place	2014 San Salvador	‍–‍70 kg

Profile at external databases
- IJF: 17280
- JudoInside.com: 71707
- Updated on 12 July 2023

Diana Brenes (born 16 February 1997) is a Costa Rican judoka. She is a bronze medalist at the Pan American Games and a three-time bronze medalist at the Pan American Judo Championships.

== Career ==
At the 2019 Pan American Games held in Lima, Peru, she won one of the bronze medals in the women's 78 kg event. In that same year, she also competed in the women's 78 kg event at the 2019 World Judo Championships held in Tokyo, Japan.

In 2020, she won one of the bronze medals in the women's 78 kg event at the Pan American Judo Championships held in Guadalajara, Mexico.

== Achievements ==
Year	Tournament	Place	Weight class
2017	Pan American Judo Championships	3rd	78 kg
2018	Pan American Judo Championships	3rd	78 kg
2019	Pan American Games	3rd	78 kg
2020	Pan American Judo Championships	3rd	78 kg
