= 2016 Pan American Judo Championships =

Judo competition

2016 Judo Pan American Judo Championships
- Venue: Havana
- Location: Havana, Cuba
- Dates: 29–30 April 2016
- Competitors: 196 from 24 nations

Competition at external databases
- Links: IJF • JudoInside

The 2016 Pan American Judo Championships was held in Havana, Cuba from 29 to 30 April 2016.

== Results ==
=== Men's events ===
Event	Gold	Silver	Bronze
Extra-lightweight (60 kg)	Felipe Kitadai; Brazil	Sérgio Pessoa; Canada	Juan Postigos; Peru
Extra-lightweight (60 kg)	Felipe Kitadai; Brazil	Sérgio Pessoa; Canada	Eric Takabatake; Brazil
Half-lightweight (66 kg)	Charles Chibana; Brazil	Eduardo Araújo; Mexico	Antoine Bouchard; Canada
Half-lightweight (66 kg)	Charles Chibana; Brazil	Eduardo Araújo; Mexico	Ángel Hernández; Mexico
Lightweight (73 kg)	Arthur Margelidon; Canada	Alex Pombo; Brazil	Magdiel Estrada; Cuba
Lightweight (73 kg)	Arthur Margelidon; Canada	Alex Pombo; Brazil	Alonso Wong; Peru
Half-middleweight (81 kg)	Antoine Valois-Fortier; Canada	Travis Stevens; United States	Victor Penalber; Brazil
Half-middleweight (81 kg)	Antoine Valois-Fortier; Canada	Travis Stevens; United States	Iván Felipe Silva Morales; Cuba
Middleweight (90 kg)	Tiago Camilo; Brazil	Colton Brown; United States	Thomas Briceño; Chile
Middleweight (90 kg)	Tiago Camilo; Brazil	Colton Brown; United States	Robert Florentino; Dominican Republic
Half-heavyweight (100 kg)	José Armenteros; Cuba	Kyle Reyes; Canada	Luciano Corrêa; Brazil
Half-heavyweight (100 kg)	José Armenteros; Cuba	Kyle Reyes; Canada	Marc Deschenes; Canada
Heavyweight (+100 kg)	Rafael Silva; Brazil	David Moura; Brazil	José Cuevas; Mexico
Heavyweight (+100 kg)	Rafael Silva; Brazil	David Moura; Brazil	Alex García Mendoza; Cuba

=== Women's events ===
Event	Gold	Silver	Bronze
Extra-lightweight (48 kg)	Sarah Menezes; Brazil	Paula Pareto; Argentina	Nathalia Brigida; Brazil
Extra-lightweight (48 kg)	Sarah Menezes; Brazil	Paula Pareto; Argentina	Dayaris Mestre Álvarez; Cuba
Half-lightweight (52 kg)	Érika Miranda; Brazil	Ecaterina Guica; Canada	Angelica Delgado; United States
Half-lightweight (52 kg)	Érika Miranda; Brazil	Ecaterina Guica; Canada	Gretel Romero; Cuba
Lightweight (57 kg)	Marti Malloy; United States	Catherine Beauchemin-Pinard; Canada	Anailis Dorvigni; Cuba
Lightweight (57 kg)	Marti Malloy; United States	Catherine Beauchemin-Pinard; Canada	Rafaela Silva; Brazil
Half-middleweight (63 kg)	Mariana Silva; Brazil	Maricet Espinosa; Cuba	Estefania García; Ecuador (ECU)
Half-middleweight (63 kg)	Mariana Silva; Brazil	Maricet Espinosa; Cuba	Stéfanie Tremblay; Canada
Middleweight (70 kg)	Yuri Alvear; Colombia	Kelita Zupancic; Canada	María Pérez; Puerto Rico
Middleweight (70 kg)	Yuri Alvear; Colombia	Kelita Zupancic; Canada	Elvismar Rodríguez; Venezuela
Half-heavyweight (78 kg)	Kayla Harrison; United States	Mayra Aguiar; Brazil	Kaliema Antomarchi; Cuba
Half-heavyweight (78 kg)	Kayla Harrison; United States	Mayra Aguiar; Brazil	Yalennis Castillo; Cuba
Heavyweight (+78 kg)	Idalys Ortiz; Cuba	Maria Suelen Altheman; Brazil	Melissa Mojica; Puerto Rico
Heavyweight (+78 kg)	Idalys Ortiz; Cuba	Maria Suelen Altheman; Brazil	Rochele Nunes; Brazil

== Medal table ==
Key

The host country is highlighted

Rank	Nation	Gold	Silver	Bronze	Total
1	Brazil (BRA)	7	4	6	17
2	Canada (CAN)	2	5	3	10
3	United States (USA)	2	2	1	5
4	Cuba (CUB)*	2	1	8	11
5	Colombia (COL)	1	0	0	1
6	Mexico (MEX)	0	1	2	3
7	Argentina (ARG)	0	1	0	1
8	Peru (PER)	0	0	2	2
8	Puerto Rico (PUR)	0	0	2	2
10	Chile (CHI)	0	0	1	1
10	Dominican Republic (DOM)	0	0	1	1
10	Ecuador (ECU)	0	0	1	1
10	Venezuela (VEN)	0	0	1	1
Totals (13 entries)		14	14	28	56
