= Vanessa Chalá =

Ecuadorian judoka (born 1990)

Personal information
- Full name: Vanessa Fernanda Chalá Minda
- Born: 13 March 1990 (age 36) Ibarra, Imbabura, Ecuador
- Occupation: Judoka

Sport
- Country: Ecuador
- Sport: Judo
- Weight class: ‍–‍70 kg, ‍–‍78 kg

Achievements and titles
- Olympic Games: R32 (2020, 2024)
- World Champ.: R16 (2011, 2015, 2019)
- Pan American Champ.: (2020, 2021)
Medal record
Women's judo
Representing Ecuador
Pan American Games
Bronze medal – third place	2019 Lima	‍–‍78 kg
Pan American Championships
Gold medal – first place	2020 Guadalajara	‍–‍78 kg
Gold medal – first place	2021 Guadalajara	‍–‍78 kg
Bronze medal – third place	2014 Guayaquil	‍–‍70 kg
Bronze medal – third place	2018 San José	‍–‍78 kg
Bronze medal – third place	2023 Calgary	‍–‍78 kg
Bronze medal – third place	2024 Rio de Janeiro	‍–‍78 kg
IJF Grand Slam
Bronze medal – third place	2021 Antalya	‍–‍78 kg
IJF Grand Prix
Bronze medal – third place	2019 Montreal	‍–‍78 kg
Pan American Junior Championships
Silver medal – second place	2009 San Salvador	‍–‍70 kg
South American Games
Gold medal – first place	2018 Cochabamba	‍–‍78 kg

Profile at external databases
- IJF: 1022
- JudoInside.com: 56494
- Updated on 3 August 2024

Vanessa Fernanda Chalá Minda (born 13 March 1990) is an Ecuadorian judoka. She is a gold medalist at the South American Games and a two-time gold medalist at the Pan American Judo Championships. She is also a bronze medalist at the Pan American Games.

== Career ==
Chalá won one of the bronze medals in the women's 70 kg event at the 2014 Pan American Judo Championships held in Guayaquil, Ecuador.

Chalá won a bronze medal in the women's 78 kg event at the 2018 Pan American Judo Championships held in San José, Costa Rica. In the same year, she won the gold medal in her event at the South American Games held in Cochabamba, Bolivia.

At the 2019 Pan American Games held in Lima, Peru, Chalá won one of the bronze medals in the women's 78 kg event. She defeated Liliana Cárdenas of Mexico in her bronze medal match. She won the gold medal in her event at the 2020 Pan American Judo Championships held in Guadalajara, Mexico.

In 2021, Chalá competed in the women's 78 kg event at the Judo World Masters held in Doha, Qatar. A few months later, she won one of the bronze medals in her event at the 2021 Judo Grand Slam Antalya held in Antalya, Turkey. In April 2021, she won the gold medal in her event at the 2021 Pan American Judo Championships held in Guadalajara, Mexico. In June 2021, she competed in the women's 78 kg event at the World Judo Championships held in Budapest, Hungary where she was eliminated in her first match.

Chalá represented Ecuador at the 2020 Summer Olympics in Tokyo, Japan. She competed in the women's 78 kg event where she was eliminated in her first match.

She won a bronze medal in her event at both the 2023 Pan American-Oceania Judo Championships held in Calgary, Canada and the 2024 Pan American-Oceania Judo Championships held in Rio de Janeiro, Brazil.

== Achievements ==
Year	Tournament	Place	Weight class
2014	Pan American Championships	3rd	−70 kg
2018	Pan American Championships	3rd	−78 kg
2018	South American Games	1st	–78 kg
2019	Pan American Games	3rd	–78 kg
2020	Pan American Championships	1st	−78 kg
2021	Pan American Championships	1st	−78 kg
2023	Pan American-Oceania Judo Championships	3rd	−78 kg
2024	Pan American-Oceania Judo Championships	3rd	−78 kg
