= Kim Eun-kyeong =

South Korean handball player (born 1991)

Personal information
- Nationality: South Korean
- Born: 3 September 1991 (age 35)
- Height: 1.78 m (5 ft 10 in)

Sport
- Sport: Handball
- Position: Left back
- Current club: Gyeongnam
National team
- Years: Team
- –: South Korea
- Kim Eun-kyeong
- Hangul: 김은경
- RR: Gim Eungyeong
- MR: Kim Ŭn'gyŏng

Kim Eun-kyeong (born 3 September 1991) is a South Korean handball player for Gyeongnam and the South Korean Republic national team.
