= Ramón Pileta =

Honduran Olympic judoka

Personal information
- Born: 20 March 1977 (age 49) Holguín, Cuba

Sport
- Sport: Judo
Medal record
Representing Honduras
Central American and Caribbean Games
Bronze medal – third place	2014 Veracruz	+100kg

Ramón Pileta Tamayo (born March 20, 1977) is a Honduran judoka. He competed at the 2016 Summer Olympics in the men's +100 kg event, in which he was eliminated in the first round by Rafael Silva.
