= Judo at the 2015 Pan American Games – Women's 48 kg =

Women's 48 kg at the 2015 Pan American Games
- Venue: Mississauga Sports Centre
- Dates: July 11
- Competitors: 10 from 10 nations

Medalists
Gold medal	Dayaris Mestre Álvarez	Cuba
Silver medal	Paula Pareto	Argentina
Bronze medal	Edna Carrillo	Mexico
Bronze medal	Nathalia Brigida	Brazil

The women's 48 kg competition of the judo events at the 2015 Pan American Games in Toronto, Canada, was held on July 11 at the Mississauga Sports Centre.

== Schedule ==
All times are Central Standard Time (UTC-6).

Date	Time	Round
July 11, 2015	15:30	Preliminary bout
July 11, 2015	15:51	Quarterfinals
July 11, 2015	16:12	Repechage
July 11, 2015	16:54	Semifinals
July 11, 2015	20:00	Bronze medal matches
July 11, 2015	20:14	Final

== Results ==
Legend

- 1st number = Ippon
- 2nd number = Waza-ari
- 3rd number = Yuko

=== Bracket ===
Preliminaries
Erin Morgan (CAN)	000
Isandrina Sánchez (DOM)	111
Diana Cobos (ECU)	000S1
Luz Álvarez (COL)	000S2

Quarter Finals
Paula Pareto (ARG)	100
Isandrina Sánchez (DOM)	000
Nathalia Brigida (BRA)	000S1
Andrea Gómez (VEN)	000S2
Edna Carrillo (MEX)	012
Judith González (CHI)	000S2
Dayaris Mestre Álvarez (CUB)	010S1
Diana Cobos (ECU)	000S1

Semi Finals
Paula Pareto (ARG)	000S1
Nathalia Brigida (BRA)	000S2
Edna Carrillo (MEX)	000S1
Dayaris Mestre Álvarez (CUB)	001S1

Final
Paula Pareto (ARG)	000S1
Dayaris Mestre Álvarez (CUB)	010S1

=== Repechage round ===
Two bronze medals were awarded.

Repechage		Bronze medal
Isandrina Sánchez (DOM)	100
Andrea Gómez (VEN)	000S1	Isandrina Sánchez (DOM)	000
		Edna Carrillo (MEX)	001S1

Repechage		Bronze medal
Judith González (CHI)	000
Diana Cobos (ECU)	101	Diana Cobos (ECU)	000S2
		Nathalia Brigida (BRA)	002S1
