= Alex García Mendoza =

Cuban judoka (born 1993)

Personal information
- Born: 2 June 1993 (age 33)
- Occupation: Judoka

Sport
- Country: Cuba
- Sport: Judo
- Weight class: +100 kg

Achievements and titles
- Olympic Games: 5th (2016)
- World Champ.: (bronze) (2017)
- Pan American Champ.: (2017)
Medal record
Men's judo
Representing Cuba
World Championships
Bronze medal – third place	2017 Marrakesh	Open
Pan American Games
Bronze medal – third place	2015 Toronto	+100 kg
Pan American Championships
Gold medal – first place	2017 Panama City	+100 kg
Bronze medal – third place	2013 San José	+100 kg
Bronze medal – third place	2015 Edmonton	+100 kg
Bronze medal – third place	2016 Havana	+100 kg
World Masters
Bronze medal – third place	2017 Saint Petersburg	+100 kg
IJF Grand Prix
Silver medal – second place	2017 Cancún	+100 kg
Bronze medal – third place	2016 Havana	+100 kg

Profile at external databases
- IJF: 1405
- JudoInside.com: 58449
- Updated on 26 June 2023

Alex Maxwell García Mendoza (born 2 June 1993) is a Cuban judoka.

García Mendoza competed at the 2016 Summer Olympics in Rio de Janeiro, in the men's +100 kg. There, he was defeated in a bronze medal match by Or Sasson of Israel.
