= Judo at the 2015 Pan American Games – Men's 100 kg =

Men's 100 kg at the 2015 Pan American Games
- Venue: Mississauga Sports Centre
- Dates: July 14
- Competitors: 10 from 10 nations

Medalists
Gold medal	Luciano Corrêa	Brazil
Silver medal	Marc Deschenes	Canada
Bronze medal	Hector Campos	Argentina
Bronze medal	Jose Armenteros	Cuba

The men's 100 kg competition of the judo events at the 2015 Pan American Games in Toronto, Canada, was held on July 14 at the Mississauga Sports Centre.

== Schedule ==
All times are Central Standard Time (UTC-6).

Date	Time	Round
July 14, 2015	15:07	Preliminary bout
July 14, 2015	16:10	Quarterfinals
July 14, 2015	15:49	Repechage
July 14, 2015	17:06	Semifinals
July 14, 2015	20:21	Bronze medal matches
July 14, 2015	20:35	Final

== Results ==
Legend

- 1st number = Ippon
- 2nd number = Waza-ari
- 3rd number = Yuko

=== Bracket ===
Preliminaries
Christopher George (TTO)	000
Manuel Bueno (URU)	100
Antony Peña (VEN)	101S1
Jose Luis Arroyo (PER)	000S3

Quarter Finals
Jose Armenteros (CUB)	100S1
Manuel Bueno (URU)	000S4
Ajax Tadehara (USA)	000
Marc Deschenes (CAN)	110
Luciano Corrêa (BRA)	100
Antony Peña (VEN)	000S2
Hector Campos (ARG)	000S1
Jaime Esquivel (MEX)	000S2

Semi Finals
Jose Armenteros (CUB)	010H
Marc Deschenes (CAN)	100S1
Luciano Corrêa (BRA)	100
Hector Campos (ARG)	000

Final
Marc Deschenes (CAN)	000S4
Luciano Corrêa (BRA)	100

=== Repechage round ===
Two bronze medals were awarded.

Repechage		Bronze medal
Manuel Bueno (URU)	101S1
Ajax Tadehara (USA)	000	Manuel Bueno (URU)	000S1
		Hector Campos (ARG)	100

Repechage		Bronze medal
Antony Peña (VEN)	100S2
Jaime Esquivel (MEX)	000	Antony Peña (VEN)	000S1
		Jose Armenteros (CUB)	101
