= Judo at the 2015 Pan American Games – Women's +78 kg =

Women's +78 kg at the 2015 Pan American Games
- Venue: Mississauga Sports Centre
- Dates: July 14
- Competitors: 8 from 8 nations

Medalists
Gold medal	Idalys Ortiz	Cuba
Silver medal	Vanessa Zambotti	Mexico
Bronze medal	Maria Suelen Altheman	Brazil
Bronze medal	Nina Cutro-Kelly	United States

The women's +78 kg competition of the judo events at the 2015 Pan American Games in Toronto, Canada, was held on July 14 at the Mississauga Sports Centre.

== Schedule ==
All times are Central Standard Time (UTC-6).

Date	Time	Round
July 14, 2015	15:14	Quarterfinals
July 14, 2015	16:03	Repechage
July 14, 2015	17:20	Semifinals
July 14, 2015	20:52	Bronze medal matches
July 14, 2015	21:06	Final

== Results ==
Legend

- 1st number = Ippon
- 2nd number = Waza-ari
- 3rd number = Yuko

=== Bracket ===
Quarter Finals
Idalys Ortiz (CUB)	100
Kenia Rodríguez (CRC)	000S1
Nina Cutro-Kelly (USA)	101S1
Leidi German (DOM)	000
Maria Suelen Altheman (BRA)	101
Emileidys López (VEN)	000
Vanessa Zambotti (MEX)	101
Samantha da Cunha (ARG)	000S1

Semi Finals
Idalys Ortiz (CUB)	101
Nina Cutro-Kelly (USA)	000
Maria Suelen Altheman (BRA)	000S2
Vanessa Zambotti (MEX)	001S3

Final
Idalys Ortiz (CUB)	000S2
Vanessa Zambotti (MEX)	000S3

=== Repechage round ===
Two bronze medals were awarded.

Repechage		Bronze medal
Kenia Rodríguez (CRC)	000S3
Leidi German (DOM)	000	Leidi German (DOM)	000
		Maria Suelen Altheman (BRA)	100

Repechage		Bronze medal
Emileidys López (VEN)	001S1
Samantha da Cunha (ARG)	101S1	Samantha da Cunha (ARG)	000S3
		Nina Cutro-Kelly (USA)	100S1
