= Héctor Campos (judoka) =

Argentine judoka (born 1987)

Personal information
- Nickname: Toto
- Born: 19 December 1988 (age 37)
- Occupation: Judoka

Sport
- Country: Argentina
- Sport: Judo
- Weight class: ‍–‍90 kg, ‍–‍100 kg, +100 kg

Achievements and titles
- Olympic Games: R32 (2012)
- World Champ.: R16 (2010)
- Pan American Champ.: (2017, 2018)
Medal record
Men's judo
Representing Argentina
Pan American Games
Bronze medal – third place	2015 Toronto	‍–‍100 kg
Pan American Championships
Silver medal – second place	2017 Panama City	+100 kg
Silver medal – second place	2018 San José	+100 kg
Bronze medal – third place	2009 Buenos Aires	Open
Bronze medal – third place	2015 Edmonton	‍–‍100 kg
IJF Grand Slam
Silver medal – second place	2012 Rio de Janeiro	‍–‍90 kg

Profile at external databases
- IJF: 2673
- JudoInside.com: 56487
- Updated on 27 November 2022

Héctor Campos (born 19 December 1987, in General Roca, Argentina) is an Argentine judoka. He competed at the 2012 Summer Olympics in the ‍–‍90 kg event.
