= 2011 World Judo Championships – Women's 48 kg =

Judo competition

Judo Women's 48 kg at the 2011 World Judo Championships
- Venue: Accor Arena
- Location: Paris, France
- Date: 23 August 2011
- Competitors: 50 from 39 nations

Medalists
gold medal	Haruna Asami (2nd title)	Japan
silver medal	Tomoko Fukumi	Japan
bronze medal	Éva Csernoviczki	Hungary
bronze medal	Sarah Menezes	Brazil

Competition at external databases
- Links: IJF • JudoInside

The women's 48 kg competition of the 2011 World Judo Championships was held on August 23.

== Medalists ==
Gold	Silver	Bronze
Haruna Asami (JPN)	Tomoko Fukumi (JPN)	Éva Csernoviczki (HUN); Sarah Menezes (BRA)

== Results ==
=== Pool A ===
First Round
(Thailand) Wanwisa Muenjit	002
(Macau) Leong Siu Pou	010
(Cuba) Dayaris Mestre Alvarez	101
(United States) Ann Shiraishi	000
(China) Wu Shugen	001
(Vietnam) Ngoc Tu Van	000
(Russia) Liudmila Bogdanova	011
(Turkey) Sümeyye Akkuş	000

Quarterfinals
(Japan) Haruna Asami	102
(Macau) Leong Siu Pou	000
(Mongolia) Baljinnyamyn Bat-Erdene	000
(Cuba) Dayaris Mestre Alvarez	011
(China) Wu Shugen	010
(Portugal) Leandra Freitas	000
(Russia) Liudmila Bogdanova	100
(Turkmenistan) Margarita Filippova	000

Semifinals
(Japan) Haruna Asami	001
(Cuba) Dayaris Mestre Alvarez	000
(China) Wu Shugen	001
(Russia) Liudmila Bogdanova	000

Final
(Japan) Haruna Asami	100
(China) Wu Shugen	000

=== Pool B ===
First Round
(Ukraine) Olha Sukha	000
(Spain) Oiana Blanco	011
(South Korea) Shin Seung-min	100
(Qatar) Salha Al-Badi	000
(Hungary) Éva Csernoviczki	001
(Armenia) Gayane Arutiunyan	000
(Nigeria) Franca Audu	000
(France) Laëtitia Payet	101
(Morocco) Wafae Idrissi Chofri	100
(Italy) Elena Moretti	010

Quarterfinals
(Brazil) Sarah Menezes	011
(Spain) Oiana Blanco	001
(South Korea) Shin Seung-min	100
(India) Suchika Tariyal	000
(Hungary) Éva Csernoviczki	101
(Senegal) Mame Seydi	000
(France) Laëtitia Payet	100
(Morocco) Wafae Idrissi Chofri	000

Semifinals
(Brazil) Sarah Menezes	101
(South Korea) Shin Seung-min	000
(Hungary) Éva Csernoviczki	010
(France) Laëtitia Payet	001

Final
(Brazil) Sarah Menezes	100
(Hungary) Éva Csernoviczki	000

=== Pool C ===
First Round
(Japan) Tomoko Fukumi	101
(Israel) Roni Schwartz	000
(Greece) Maria Karagiannopoulou	100
(Vanuatu) Veronica Tari	000
(France) Frédérique Jossinet	101
(Mexico) Edna Carrillo	000
(Netherlands) Birgit Ente	010
(South Korea) Jeong Bo Kyeong	001
(Cameroon) Philomene Bata	100
(Sri Lanka) Chamila Dewadipathi	000

Quarterfinals
(Japan) Tomoko Fukumi	001
(Kazakhstan) Alexandra Podryadova	000
(Greece) Maria Karagiannopoulou	000
(Ukraine) Maryna Cherniak	100
(France) Frédérique Jossinet	001
(Netherlands) Birgit Ente	000
(United States) Angela Woosley	101
(Cameroon) Philomene Bata	000

Semifinals
(Japan) Tomoko Fukumi	002
(Ukraine) Maryna Cherniak	000
(France) Frédérique Jossinet	100
(United States) Angela Woosley	000

Final
(Japan) Tomoko Fukumi	100
(France) Frédérique Jossinet	000

=== Pool D ===
First Round
(Romania) Alina Dumitru	101
(Turkmenistan) Madina Babakuleva	000
(Portugal) Ana Hormigo	001
(Russia) Nataliya Kondratyeva	000
(Belgium) Charline Van Snick	102
(China) Xie Shishi	000
(Republic of Ireland) Lisa Kearney	100
(Colombia) Luz Adiela Alvarez	000

Quarterfinals
(Romania) Alina Dumitru	101
(Mongolia) Munkhbat Urantsetseg	000
(Italy) Valentina Moscatt	000
(Portugal) Ana Hormigo	001
(Belgium) Charline Van Snick	101
(Dominican Republic) Isandrina Sanchez	000
(Republic of Ireland) Lisa Kearney	101
(Poland) Ewa Konieczny	000

Semifinals
(Romania) Alina Dumitru	010
(Portugal) Ana Hormigo	001
(Belgium) Charline Van Snick	100
(Republic of Ireland) Lisa Kearney	000

Final
(Romania) Alina Dumitru	010
(Belgium) Charline Van Snick	011

=== Repechage ===
Repechage		Third place
(China) Wu Shugen	001
(Hungary) Éva Csernoviczki	010	(Hungary) Éva Csernoviczki	110
		(Belgium) Charline Van Snick	000

Repechage		Third place
(France) Frédérique Jossinet	100
(Romania) Alina Dumitru	000	(France) Frédérique Jossinet	001
		(Brazil) Sarah Menezes	101

=== Finals ===
Semi-finals
(Japan) Haruna Asami	100
(Brazil) Sarah Menezes	000
(Japan) Tomoko Fukumi	001
(Belgium) Charline Van Snick	000

Final
(Japan) Haruna Asami	001
(Japan) Tomoko Fukumi	000
