= 2010 World Judo Championships – Women's 48 kg =

Judo competition

Judo Women's 48 kg at the 2010 World Judo Championships
- Venue: Yoyogi National Gymnasium
- Location: Tokyo, Japan
- Date: 12 September 2010
- Competitors: 45 from 33 nations

Medalists
gold medal	Haruna Asami (1st title)	Japan
silver medal	Tomoko Fukumi	Japan
bronze medal	Alina Dumitru	Romania
bronze medal	Sarah Menezes	Brazil

Competition at external databases
- Links: IJF • JudoInside

The women's 48 kg competition of the 2010 World Judo Championships was held on September 12.

== Medalists ==
Gold	Silver	Bronze
Haruna Asami (JPN)	Tomoko Fukumi (JPN)	Alina Dumitru (ROU); Sarah Menezes (BRA)

== Results ==
=== Pool A ===
First Round
(Japan) Tomoko Fukumi	100
(Spain) Oiana Blanco	000
(Mali) Mama Diarra	000
(France) Laëtitia Payet	102
(China) Qinqin Mo	100
(Thailand) Wanwisa Muenjit	000
(Macau) Leong Siu Pou	000
(Philippines) Nancy Quillotes	112

Quarterfinals
(Japan) Tomoko Fukumi	100
(Mongolia) Munkhbat Urantsetseg	000
(Romania) Carmen Bogdan	000
(France) Laëtitia Payet	101
(Argentina) Paula Pareto	011
(China) Qinqin Mo	001
(Israel) Roni Schwartz	020
(Philippines) Nancy Quillotes	000

Semifinals
(Japan) Tomoko Fukumi	100
(France) Laëtitia Payet	000
(Argentina) Paula Pareto	001
(Israel) Roni Schwartz	000

Final
(Japan) Tomoko Fukumi	100
(Argentina) Paula Pareto	002

=== Pool B ===
First Round
(Italy) Elena Moretti	110
(Tunisia) Amani Khalfaoui	000
(India) Khumujam Tombi Devi	000
(Mexico) Edna Carrillo	001
(Belgium) Charline Van Snick	000
(Belarus) Volha Leshchanka	100

Quarterfinals
(South Korea) Jung-Yeon Chung	110
(United States) Katelyn Bouyssou	001
(United Kingdom) Kimberley Renicks	000
(Italy) Elena Moretti	013
(Brazil) Sarah Menezes	100
(Mexico) Edna Carrillo	000
(Russia) Liudmila Bogdanova	100
(Belarus) Volha Leshchanka	000

Semifinals
(South Korea) Jung-Yeon Chung	100
(Italy) Elena Moretti	000
(Brazil) Sarah Menezes	001
(Russia) Liudmila Bogdanova	000

Final
(South Korea) Jung-Yeon Chung	000
(Brazil) Sarah Menezes	100

=== Pool C ===
First Round
(Japan) Haruna Asami	101
(Belgium) Amelie Rosseneu	000
(Spain) Vanesa Garcia	000
(China) Wu Shugen	001
(Russia) Nataliya Kondratyeva	000
(Portugal) Leandra Freitas	001

Quarterfinals
(Japan) Haruna Asami	101
(Canada) Isabel Latulippe	001
(Turkey) Sümeyye Akkuş	000
(China) Wu Shugen	001
(Portugal) Leandra Freitas	020
(Qatar) Salha Al-Badi	000
(Turkmenistan) Margarita Filippova	000
(United Kingdom) Kelly Edwards	001

Semifinals
(Japan) Haruna Asami	100
(China) Wu Shugen	000
(Portugal) Leandra Freitas	001
(United Kingdom) Kelly Edwards	000

Final
(Japan) Haruna Asami	100
(Portugal) Leandra Freitas	000

=== Pool D ===
First Round
(Vietnam) Ngoc Tu Van	000
(Armenia) Gayane Arutiunyan	100
(Cuba) Dayaris Mestre Alvarez	011
(Germany) Michaela Baschin	000
(United States) Ann Shiraishi	022
(El Salvador) Stefany Garcia	000

Quarterfinals
(France) Frédérique Jossinet	002
(Armenia) Gayane Arutiunyan	000
(South Korea) Kim Mi-ri	000
(Cuba) Dayaris Mestre Alvarez	001
(Romania) Alina Dumitru	002
(Italy) Valentina Moscatt	000
(Mongolia) Baljinnyamyn Bat-Erdene	110
(United States) Ann Shiraishi	000

Semifinals
(France) Frédérique Jossinet	003
(Cuba) Dayaris Mestre Alvarez	000
(Romania) Alina Dumitru	100
(Mongolia) Baljinnyamyn Bat-Erdene	001H

Final
(France) Frédérique Jossinet	002
(Romania) Alina Dumitru	101

=== Repechage ===
Repechage		Third place
(Argentina) Paula Pareto	000
(South Korea) Jung-Yeon Chung	100	(South Korea) Jung-Yeon Chung	001
		(Romania) Alina Dumitru	020

Repechage		Third place
(Portugal) Leandra Freitas	000
(France) Frédérique Jossinet	020	(France) Frédérique Jossinet	001
		(Brazil) Sarah Menezes	100

=== Finals ===
Semi-finals
(Japan) Tomoko Fukumi	000
(Brazil) Sarah Menezes	000
(Japan) Haruna Asami	100
(Romania) Alina Dumitru	000

Final
(Japan) Tomoko Fukumi	000
(Japan) Haruna Asami	001
