= Judo Grand Slam Paris =

Judo competition

The Paris Grand Slam (Super A-Tournament Tournoi de Paris until 2004, Super World Cup Tournoi de Paris until 2008) is an international, judo competition held at the Palais Omnisports de Paris-Bercy in Paris, as part of the IJF World Tour Grand Slam series organized by the IJF.

== Venues ==
- Stade Pierre de Coubertin (1971–1999)
- Palais Omnisports de Paris-Bercy (2000–)

== Past winners ==
=== Men's ===
Year	−60 kg	−66 kg	−73 kg	−81 kg	−90 kg	−100 kg	+100 kg	Ref.
as Super A-Tournament Tournoi de Paris
2004	(Japan) Tadahiro Nomura	(Japan) Tomoo Torii	(Japan) Masahiro Takamatsu	(France) Anthony Rodriguez	(Japan) Hiroshi Izumi	(Israel) Ariel Ze'evi	(Iran) Mahmoud Miran	
as Super World Cup Tournoi de Paris
2005	(Austria) Ludwig Paischer	(Japan) Hiroyuki Akimoto	(France) Daniel Fernandes	(Netherlands) Guillaume Elmont	(Greece) Ilias Iliadis	(South Korea) Yoo Kwang-sun	(Tunisia) Anis Chedly	
2006	(South Korea) Cho Nam-suk	(Brazil) João Derly	(Bulgaria) Georgi Georgiev	(Italy) Giuseppe Maddaloni	(South Korea) Hwang Hee-tae	(Russia) Ruslan Gasimov	(Japan) Yohei Takai	
2007	(Azerbaijan) Nijat Shikhalizada	(Japan) Hiroyuki Akimoto	(Japan) Yusuke Kanamaru	(Netherlands) Guillaume Elmont	(Russia) Khasanbi Taov	(Hungary) Dániel Hadfi	(Japan) Kōsei Inoue	
2008	(Japan) Hiroaki Hiraoka	(South Korea) Kim Joo-jin	(Moldova) Sergiu Toma	(Russia) Alibek Bashkaev	(Russia) Khasanbi Taov	(Greece) Ilias Iliadis	(France) Teddy Riner	
as Grand Slam Paris
2009	(France) Dimitri Dragin	(Japan) Masato Uchishiba	(South Korea) Wang Ki-chun	(South Korea) Song Dae-nam	(France) Yves-Matthieu Dafreville	(Japan) Takamasa Anai	(France) Teddy Riner	
2010	(Georgia (country)) David Asumbani	(South Korea) Kim Joo-jin	(South Korea) Wang Ki-chun	(Brazil) Leandro Guilheiro	(Japan) Takashi Ono	(Belgium) Elco van der Geest	(France) Teddy Riner	
2011	(Uzbekistan) Rishod Sobirov	(Japan) Junpei Morishita	(Japan) Riki Nakaya	(South Korea) Kim Jae-bum	(Japan) Daiki Nishiyama	(Netherlands) Henk Grol	(France) Teddy Riner	
2012	(Uzbekistan) Rishod Sobirov	(France) David Larose	(Mongolia) Sainjargalyn Nyam-Ochir	(Germany) Ole Bischof	(Uzbekistan) Dilshod Choriev	(Mongolia) Naidangiin Tüvshinbayar	(France) Teddy Riner	
2013	(Japan) Naohisa Takato	(France) David Larose	(Mongolia) Khashbaataryn Tsagaanbaatar	(Uzbekistan) Yakhyo Imamov	(Georgia (country)) Varlam Liparteliani	(Czech Republic) Lukáš Krpálek	(France) Teddy Riner	
2014	(Mongolia) Ganbatyn Boldbaatar	(Russia) Mikhail Pulyaev	(South Korea) Bang Gui-man	(Georgia (country)) Avtandili Tchrikishvili	(South Korea) Lee Kyu-won	(France) Cyrille Maret	(Japan) Ryu Shichinohe	
2015	(Japan) Naohisa Takato	(Mongolia) Davaadorjiin Tömörkhüleg	(Japan) Hiroyuki Akimoto	(Uzbekistan) Shakhzodbek Sabirov	(Georgia (country)) Varlam Liparteliani	(France) Cyrille Maret	(Japan) Hisayoshi Harasawa	
2016	(Japan) Toru Shishime	(Japan) Masashi Ebinuma	(South Korea) An Chang-rim	(Georgia (country)) Avtandili Tchrikishvili	(Japan) Daiki Nishiyama	(France) Cyrille Maret	(Japan) Hisayoshi Harasawa	
2017	(Japan) Naohisa Takato	(Japan) Hifumi Abe	(Japan) Soichi Hashimoto	(Netherlands) Frank de Wit	(China) Cheng Xunzhao	(Japan) Kentaro Iida	(Japan) Takeshi Ōjitani	
2018	(Japan) Toru Shishime	(South Korea) An Ba-ul	(Kosovo) Akil Gjakova	(Japan) Sotaro Fujiwara	(Japan) Shoichiro Mukai	(Netherlands) Michael Korrel	(Japan) Kokoro Kageura	
2019	(Japan) Naohisa Takato	(Moldova) Denis Vieru	(Japan) Soichi Hashimoto	(Germany) Dominic Ressel	(South Korea) Gwak Dong-han	(Georgia (country)) Varlam Liparteliani	(South Korea) Kim Sung-min	
2020	(Japan) Ryuju Nagayama	(South Korea) An Ba-ul	(Japan) Soichi Hashimoto	(Belgium) Matthias Casse	(Spain) Nikoloz Sherazadishvili	(Israel) Peter Paltchik	(Netherlands) Henk Grol	
2021	(Azerbaijan) Balabay Aghayev	(Japan) Ryoma Tanaka	(Japan) Kenshi Harada	(Japan) Takeshi Sasaki	(Japan) Kenta Nagasawa	(Russia) Arman Adamian	(Russia) Inal Tasoev	
2022	(Japan) Ryuju Nagayama	(Mongolia) Yondonperenlein Baskhüü	(Georgia (country)) Lasha Shavdatuashvili	(Japan) Sotaro Fujiwara	(Japan) Sanshiro Murao	(Belgium) Toma Nikiforov	(Mongolia) Odkhüügiin Tsetsentsengel	
2023	(Azerbaijan) Balabay Aghayev	(Ukraine) Bogdan Iadov	(Georgia (country)) Lasha Shavdatuashvili	(Georgia (country)) Tato Grigalashvili	(Netherlands) Noël van 't End	(Netherlands) Michael Korrel	(France) Teddy Riner	
2024	(France) Luka Mkheidze	(Japan) Takeshi Takeoka	(Japan) Tatsuki Ishihara	(Belgium) Matthias Casse	(Turkey) Mihael Žgank	(Japan) Aaron Wolf	(France) Teddy Riner	
2025	(France) Romain Valadier-Picard	(Azerbaijan) Ruslan Pashayev	(Uzbekistan) Shakhram Ahadov	(Canada) François Gauthier-Drapeau	(South Korea) Kim Jong-hoon	(United Arab Emirates) Dzhafar Kostoev	Inal Tasoev	
2026	(Azerbaijan) Balabay Aghayev	(Japan) Takeshi Takeoka	(United Arab Emirates) Makhmadbek Makhmadbekov	(Japan) Yuhei Oino	(Japan) Goki Tajima	(Japan) Dota Arai	(Japan) Kanta Nakano	

=== Women's ===
Year	−48 kg	−52 kg	−57 kg	−63 kg	−70 kg	−78 kg	+78 kg	Ref.
as Grand Slam Paris
2009	(Japan) Emi Yamagishi	(Russia) Natalia Kuziutina	(Greece) Ioulietta Boukouvala	(Japan) Yoshie Ueno	(France) Lucie Décosse	(France) Céline Lebrun	(China) Tong Wen	
2010	(Japan) Emi Yamagishi	(Japan) Misato Nakamura	(Japan) Kaori Matsumoto	(France) Gévrise Émane	(France) Lucie Décosse	(Japan) Akari Ogata	(Russia) Elena Ivashchenko	
2011	(Japan) Haruna Asami	(Mongolia) Mönkhbaataryn Bundmaa	(France) Automne Pavia	(France) Gévrise Émane	(France) Lucie Décosse	(France) Audrey Tcheuméo	(Japan) Megumi Tachimoto	
2012	(Japan) Tomoko Fukumi	(Japan) Yuka Nishida	(Portugal) Telma Monteiro	(Japan) Miki Tanaka	(Japan) Haruka Tachimoto	(Brazil) Mayra Aguiar	(Japan) Megumi Tachimoto	
2013	(Japan) Haruna Asami	(Japan) Yuki Hashimoto	(France) Automne Pavia	(France) Clarisse Agbegnenou	(Netherlands) Kim Polling	(France) Lucie Louette	(Japan) Megumi Tachimoto	
2014	(Japan) Emi Yamagishi	(Kosovo) Majlinda Kelmendi	(Japan) Anzu Yamamoto	(France) Clarisse Agbegnenou	(Netherlands) Linda Bolder	(Slovenia) Anamari Velenšek	(Japan) Kanae Yamabe	
2015	(Mongolia) Mönkhbatyn Urantsetseg	(Kosovo) Majlinda Kelmendi	(Portugal) Telma Monteiro	(Slovenia) Tina Trstenjak	(Japan) Haruka Tachimoto	(France) Audrey Tcheuméo	(France) Émilie Andéol	
2016	(Kazakhstan) Otgontsetseg Galbadrakh	(Kosovo) Majlinda Kelmendi	(South Korea) Kim Jan-di	(France) Clarisse Agbegnenou	(South Korea) Kim Seong-yeon	(Brazil) Mayra Aguiar	(Japan) Megumi Tachimoto	
2017	(South Korea) Jeong Bo-kyeong	(Kosovo) Majlinda Kelmendi	(South Korea) Kwon You-jeong	(Slovenia) Tina Trstenjak	(Japan) Chizuru Arai	(France) Audrey Tcheuméo	(Japan) Sarah Asahina	
2018	(Ukraine) Daria Bilodid	(Japan) Uta Abe	(Canada) Christa Deguchi	(France) Clarisse Agbegnenou	(United Kingdom) Sally Conway	(France) Audrey Tcheuméo	(South Korea) Kim Min-jeong	
2019	(Japan) Ami Kondo	(Japan) Ai Shishime	(Canada) Christa Deguchi	(France) Clarisse Agbegnenou	(Japan) Yoko Ono	(France) Madeleine Malonga	(Cuba) Idalys Ortiz	
2020	(Ukraine) Daria Bilodid	(Kosovo) Distria Krasniqi	(Canada) Christa Deguchi	(France) Clarisse Agbegnenou	(Japan) Yoko Ono	(France) Madeleine Malonga	(France) Romane Dicko	
2021	(Japan) Wakana Koga	(Israel) Gefen Primo	(Japan) Haruka Funakubo	(Portugal) Bárbara Timo	(Japan) Saki Niizoe	(Russia) Aleksandra Babintseva	(Israel) Raz Hershko	
2022	(Japan) Natsumi Tsunoda	(France) Amandine Buchard	(Japan) Haruka Funakubo	(Japan) Nami Nabekura	(France) Margaux Pinot	(France) Audrey Tcheuméo	(Japan) Wakaba Tomita	
2023	(France) Blandine Pont	(Kosovo) Distria Krasniqi	(France) Priscilla Gneto	(Israel) Gili Sharir	(Spain) Ai Tsunoda	(France) Audrey Tcheuméo	(South Korea) Kim Ha-yun	
2024	(France) Shirine Boukli	(Kosovo) Distria Krasniqi	(France) Faïza Mokdar	(France) Clarisse Agbegnenou	(Germany) Miriam Butkereit	(Germany) Anna-Maria Wagner	(France) Romane Dicko	
2025	(Japan) Mitsuki Kondo	(Japan) Kisumi Omori	(France) Martha Fawaz	(Japan) Haruka Kaju	(Spain) Ai Tsunoda	(Portugal) Patrícia Sampaio	(France) Léa Fontaine	
2026	(France) Shirine Boukli	(Kosovo) Distria Krasniqi	(France) Sarah-Léonie Cysique	(Brazil) Rafaela Silva	(Hungary) Szofi Özbas	(Italy) Alice Bellandi	(France) Romane Dicko	
