= 2013 World Judo Championships – Women's 48 kg =

Judo competition

Judo Women's 48 kg at the 2013 World Judo Championships
- Venue: Ginásio do Maracanãzinho
- Location: Rio de Janeiro, Brazil
- Date: 26 August 2013
- Competitors: 37 from 28 nations

Medalists
gold medal	Munkhbat Urantsetseg (1st title)	Mongolia
silver medal	Haruna Asami	Japan
bronze medal	Charline Van Snick	Belgium
bronze medal	Sarah Menezes	Brazil

Competition at external databases
- Links: IJF • JudoInside

The women's 48 kg competition of the 2013 World Judo Championships was held on August 26.

== Medalists ==
Gold	Silver	Bronze
Munkhbat Urantsetseg (MGL)	Haruna Asami (JPN)	Charline Van Snick (BEL); Sarah Menezes (BRA)

== Results ==
=== Pool A ===
First Round
(Guatemala) Jacqueline Solis	000
(Romania) Monica Ungureanu	100

Quarterfinals
(Brazil) Sarah Menezes	010
(Kazakhstan) Aigul Baikuleva	000
(North Korea) Rim Song Sim	000
(Belgium) Amelie Rosseneu	000
(Turkey) Ebru Sahin	001
(Ecuador) Diana Cobos	000
(France) Laëtitia Payet	100
(Romania) Monica Ungureanu	000

Semifinals
(Brazil) Sarah Menezes	110
(Belgium) Amelie Rosseneu	000
(Turkey) Ebru Sahin	000
(France) Laëtitia Payet	000

Final
(Brazil) Sarah Menezes	100
(Turkey) Ebru Sahin	000

=== Pool B ===
First Round
(Cuba) Maria Celia Laborde	100
(Italy) Valentina Moscatt	010
(Ukraine) Maryna Krot	002
(Russia) Lusine Avakyan	000

Quarterfinals
(Hungary) Éva Csernoviczki	110
(China) Li Yanan	000
(United States) Alexa Liddie	000
(Cuba) Maria Celia Laborde	100
(Mongolia) Munkhbat Urantsetseg	100
(Ukraine) Maryna Krot	000
(Venezuela) Andrea Gomez	000
(Colombia) Eblin Lucumi	001

Semifinals
(Hungary) Éva Csernoviczki	001
(Cuba) Maria Celia Laborde	010
(Mongolia) Munkhbat Urantsetseg	100
(Colombia) Eblin Lucumi	000

Final
(Cuba) Maria Celia Laborde	000
(Mongolia) Munkhbat Urantsetseg	110

=== Pool C ===
First Round
(Turkey) Sümeyye Akkuş	000
(Kazakhstan) Alexandra Podryadova	001

Quarterfinals
(Japan) Haruna Asami	100
(Kazakhstan) Alexandra Podryadova	000
(Romania) Carmen Bogdan	100
(Gabon) Esther Corine Ewala Bondime	000
(Cuba) Dayaris Mestre Alvarez	100
(Chile) Antonieta Galleguillos	000
(Barbados) Onoh Obasi Okey	000
(Argentina) Paula Pareto	111

Semifinals
(Japan) Haruna Asami	100
(Romania) Carmen Bogdan	000
(Cuba) Dayaris Mestre Alvarez	000
(Argentina) Paula Pareto	000

Final
(Japan) Haruna Asami	100
(Cuba) Dayaris Mestre Alvarez	000

=== Pool D ===
First Round
(Madagascar) Asaramanitra Ratiarison	000
(Dominican Republic) Isandrina Sanchez	000

Quarterfinals
(Belgium) Charline Van Snick	101
(Dominican Republic) Isandrina Sanchez	000
(Guinea-Bissau) Taciana Lima	101
(South Korea) Choi Soo-hee	000
(Mongolia) Otgontsetseg Galbadrakh	000
(Russia) Alesya Kuznetsova	100
(North Korea) Kim Sol Mi	010
(Ukraine) Maryna Cherniak	000

Semifinals
(Belgium) Charline Van Snick	110
(Guinea-Bissau) Taciana Lima	000
(Russia) Alesya Kuznetsova	000
(North Korea) Kim Sol Mi	010

Final
(Belgium) Charline Van Snick	100
(North Korea) Kim Sol Mi	000

=== Finals ===
Semi-finals
(Brazil) Sarah Menezes	000
(Mongolia) Munkhbat Urantsetseg	002
(Japan) Haruna Asami	010
(Belgium) Charline Van Snick	000

Final
(Mongolia) Munkhbat Urantsetseg	100
(Japan) Haruna Asami	000

=== Repechage ===
Repechage		Third place
(Turkey) Ebru Sahin	000
(Cuba) Maria Celia Laborde	011	(Cuba) Maria Celia Laborde	000
		(Belgium) Charline Van Snick	110

Repechage		Third place
(Cuba) Dayaris Mestre Alvarez	000
(North Korea) Kim Sol Mi	100	(North Korea) Kim Sol Mi	000
		(Brazil) Sarah Menezes	100
