= Laëtitia Payet =

French judoka (born 1985)

Personal information
- Born: 2 October 1985 (age 41)
- Occupation: Judoka

Sport
- Country: France
- Sport: Judo
- Weight class: ‍–‍48 kg

Achievements and titles
- Olympic Games: R16 (2012, 2016)
- World Champ.: R16 (2010, 2011, 2013)
- European Champ.: (bronze) (2011, 2012, 2013)
Medal record
Women's judo
Representing France
European Championships
Bronze medal – third place	2011 Istanbul	‍–‍48 kg
Bronze medal – third place	2012 Chelyabinsk	‍–‍48 kg
Bronze medal – third place	2013 Budapest	‍–‍48 kg
IJF Grand Slam
Silver medal – second place	2013 Paris	‍–‍48 kg
Bronze medal – third place	2010 Moscow	‍–‍48 kg
Bronze medal – third place	2016 Baku	‍–‍48 kg
IJF Grand Prix
Gold medal – first place	2015 Ulaanbaatar	‍–‍48 kg
Silver medal – second place	2010 Tunis	‍–‍48 kg
Silver medal – second place	2010 Qingdao	‍–‍48 kg
Bronze medal – third place	2009 Abu Dhabi	‍–‍48 kg
Bronze medal – third place	2009 Qingdao	‍–‍48 kg
Bronze medal – third place	2010 Abu Dhabi	‍–‍48 kg
Bronze medal – third place	2012 Düsseldorf	‍–‍48 kg
Bronze medal – third place	2016 Samsun	‍–‍48 kg
European U23 Championships
Gold medal – first place	2005 Kyiv	‍–‍48 kg
Mediterranean Games
Bronze medal – third place	2009 Pescara	‍–‍48 kg

Profile at external databases
- IJF: 1738
- JudoInside.com: 18855
- Updated on 14 November 2022

Laëtitia Payet (born 2 October 1985 in Meslan) is a French judoka who competes in the women's 48 kg category. At the 2012 Summer Olympics, she was defeated in the second round. At the 2016 Summer Olympics, she was eliminated by Mönkhbatyn Urantsetseg in the second round.
