= Alina Dumitru =

Romanian judoka (born 1982)

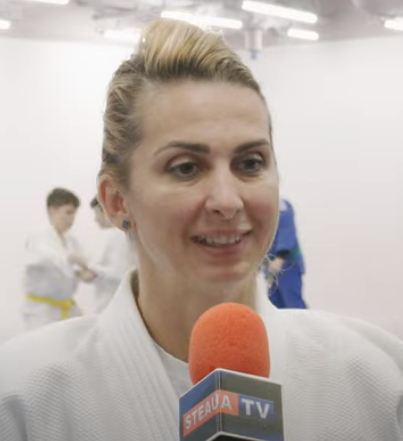

Personal information
- Full name: Alina Alexandra Dumitru
- Nickname: Piti
- Born: 30 August 1982 (age 43) Bucharest, Romania
- Occupation: Judoka
- Height: 1.58 m (5 ft 2 in)

Sport
- Country: Romania
- Sport: Judo
- Weight class: ‍–‍48 kg
- Club: CSA Steaua București
- Coached by: Florin Bercean

Achievements and titles
- Olympic Games: (gold) (2008)
- World Champ.: (bronze) (2005, 2007, 2010)
- European Champ.: (gold) (2004, 2005, 2006, 2007, 2008, 2010, 2011, 2012)
Medal record
Women's judo
Representing Romania
Olympic Games
Gold medal – first place	2008 Beijing	‍–‍48 kg
Silver medal – second place	2012 London	‍–‍48 kg
World Championships
Bronze medal – third place	2005 Cairo	‍–‍48 kg
Bronze medal – third place	2007 Rio de Janeiro	‍–‍48 kg
Bronze medal – third place	2010 Tokyo	‍–‍48 kg
European Championships
Gold medal – first place	2004 Bucharest	‍–‍48 kg
Gold medal – first place	2005 Rotterdam	‍–‍48 kg
Gold medal – first place	2006 Tampere	‍–‍48 kg
Gold medal – first place	2007 Belgrade	‍–‍48 kg
Gold medal – first place	2008 Lisbon	‍–‍48 kg
Gold medal – first place	2010 Vienna	‍–‍48 kg
Gold medal – first place	2011 Istanbul	‍–‍48 kg
Gold medal – first place	2012 Chelyabinsk	‍–‍48 kg
Bronze medal – third place	2002 Maribor	‍–‍52 kg
Bronze medal – third place	2009 Tbilisi	‍–‍48 kg
IJF Grand Slam
Silver medal – second place	2012 Moscow	‍–‍48 kg
Bronze medal – third place	2012 Paris	‍–‍48 kg
IJF Grand Prix
Gold medal – first place	2010 Tunis	‍–‍48 kg
Gold medal – first place	2010 Abu Dhabi	‍–‍48 kg
Silver medal – second place	2009 Hamburg	‍–‍48 kg
Silver medal – second place	2010 Rotterdam	‍–‍48 kg
Bronze medal – third place	2010 Düsseldorf	‍–‍48 kg
Bronze medal – third place	2011 Düsseldorf	‍–‍48 kg
Bronze medal – third place	2011 Amsterdam	‍–‍48 kg
World Juniors Championships
Gold medal – first place	2000 Nabeul	‍–‍48 kg
European Junior Championships
Silver medal – second place	2001 Budapest	‍–‍48 kg

Profile at external databases
- IJF: 383
- JudoInside.com: 8604
- Updated on 18 April 2024

Alina Dumitru (Romanian pronunciation: [aˈlina duˈmitru]; born 30 August 1982) is a Romanian judoka, Olympic Gold medallist and multiple European champion. At the 2008 Summer Olympics she became Romania's first judoka to win an Olympic Gold medal.

== Career ==
=== Early life ===
Dumitru was born on 30 August 1982. She trained with Romania's national judo team under coach Florin Bercean.

=== 2008 Summer Olympics ===
At the Beijing Science and Technology University Gymnasium, Dumitru reached the Women's 48 kg semifinals. There she faced Japanese double gold medalist Ryoko Tani, who until then had been undefeated in major international competitions for 12 years. She defeated Tani by "keikoku" and described her semifinal victory as "a dream". In the final she overcame Yanet Bermoy from Cuba, taking just 80 seconds to win the bout by ippon. In doing so, Dumitru became the first Romanian judoka to win a gold medal in the Summer Olympic Games.

=== 2012 Summer Olympics ===
Dumitru took part in the Judo at the 2012 Summer Olympics. She defeated Mongolian Mönkhbatyn Urantsetseg in the quarter finals in a close contest. In the semifinals, Dumitru beat world number one Tomoko Fukumi, her first victory against the opponent after four defeats. She lost in the final against Brazilian Sarah Menezes to win a silver medal, which was Romania's first medal at the London Olympics. In 2013 she announced her retirement from the sport.

=== Other events ===
Dumitru won nine medals, seven gold and two silver, at the European Judo Championships. She also won three bronze medals at the World Championships.

== Awards ==
Dumitru was decorated by the president of Romania, Traian Băsescu, with Medalia "Meritul Sportiv" ("Sportive Merit" Medal) class I.

She was given the award of Cetățean de onoare ("Honorary Citizen") of her hometown Ploiești in 2008. In 2012 she received the title Honorary Citizen of Cluj County.
