= 2011 Judo Grand Slam Paris =

Judo competition

Judo 2011 Judo Grand Slam Paris
- Venue: Accor Arena
- Location: Paris, France
- Dates: 5–6 February 2011
- Competitors: 511 from 79 nations

Competition at external databases
- Links: IJF • EJU • JudoInside

The 2011 Judo Grand Slam Paris was held in Paris, France, from 5 to 6 February 2011.

== Medal summary ==
=== Men's events ===
| Event | Gold | Silver | Bronze |
|---|---|---|---|
| Extra-lightweight (−60 kg) | Rishod Sobirov (UZB) | Hovhannes Davtyan (ARM) | Amiran Papinashvili (GEO) |
| Extra-lightweight (−60 kg) | Rishod Sobirov (UZB) | Hovhannes Davtyan (ARM) | Georgii Zantaraia (UKR) |
| Half-lightweight (−66 kg) | Junpei Morishita (JPN) | Armen Nazaryan (ARM) | Masaaki Fukuoka (JPN) |
| Half-lightweight (−66 kg) | Junpei Morishita (JPN) | Armen Nazaryan (ARM) | David Larose (FRA) |
| Lightweight (−73 kg) | Riki Nakaya (JPN) | Attila Ungvári (HUN) | Yasuhiro Awano (JPN) |
| Lightweight (−73 kg) | Riki Nakaya (JPN) | Attila Ungvári (HUN) | Ugo Legrand (FRA) |
| Half-middleweight (−81 kg) | Kim Jae-bum (KOR) | Guillaume Elmont (NED) | László Csoknyai (HUN) |
| Half-middleweight (−81 kg) | Kim Jae-bum (KOR) | Guillaume Elmont (NED) | Alain Schmitt (FRA) |
| Middleweight (−90 kg) | Daiki Nishiyama (JPN) | Tiago Camilo (BRA) | Romain Buffet (FRA) |
| Middleweight (−90 kg) | Daiki Nishiyama (JPN) | Tiago Camilo (BRA) | Khurshid Nabiev (UZB) |
| Half-heavyweight (−100 kg) | Henk Grol (NED) | Naidangiin Tüvshinbayar (MGL) | Jevgeņijs Borodavko (LAT) |
| Half-heavyweight (−100 kg) | Henk Grol (NED) | Naidangiin Tüvshinbayar (MGL) | Hwang Hee-tae (KOR) |
| Heavyweight (+100 kg) | Teddy Riner (FRA) | Daiki Kamikawa (JPN) | Óscar Brayson (CUB) |
| Heavyweight (+100 kg) | Teddy Riner (FRA) | Daiki Kamikawa (JPN) | Kim Sung-min (KOR) |

=== Women's events ===
| Event | Gold | Silver | Bronze |
|---|---|---|---|
| Extra-lightweight (−48 kg) | Haruna Asami (JPN) | Éva Csernoviczki (HUN) | Dayaris Mestre Álvarez (CUB) |
| Extra-lightweight (−48 kg) | Haruna Asami (JPN) | Éva Csernoviczki (HUN) | Sarah Menezes (BRA) |
| Half-lightweight (−52 kg) | Mönkhbaataryn Bundmaa (MGL) | Soraya Haddad (ALG) | Ana Carrascosa (ESP) |
| Half-lightweight (−52 kg) | Mönkhbaataryn Bundmaa (MGL) | Soraya Haddad (ALG) | Priscilla Gneto (FRA) |
| Lightweight (−57 kg) | Automne Pavia (FRA) | Aiko Sato (JPN) | Corina Căprioriu (ROU) |
| Lightweight (−57 kg) | Automne Pavia (FRA) | Aiko Sato (JPN) | Telma Monteiro (POR) |
| Half-middleweight (−63 kg) | Gévrise Émane (FRA) | Xu Lili (CHN) | Clarisse Agbegnenou (FRA) |
| Half-middleweight (−63 kg) | Gévrise Émane (FRA) | Xu Lili (CHN) | Urška Žolnir (SLO) |
| Middleweight (−70 kg) | Lucie Décosse (FRA) | Kerstin Thiele (GER) | Edith Bosch (NED) |
| Middleweight (−70 kg) | Lucie Décosse (FRA) | Kerstin Thiele (GER) | Yoriko Kunihara (JPN) |
| Half-heavyweight (−78 kg) | Audrey Tcheuméo (FRA) | Lucie Louette (FRA) | Mayra Aguiar (BRA) |
| Half-heavyweight (−78 kg) | Audrey Tcheuméo (FRA) | Lucie Louette (FRA) | Abigél Joó (HUN) |
| Heavyweight (+78 kg) | Megumi Tachimoto (JPN) | Lucija Polavder (SLO) | Liu Huanyuan (CHN) |
| Heavyweight (+78 kg) | Megumi Tachimoto (JPN) | Lucija Polavder (SLO) | Idalys Ortiz (CUB) |

Source Results

=== Medal table ===
* Host nation (France)

| Rank | Nation | Gold | Silver | Bronze | Total |
|---|---|---|---|---|---|
| 1 | Japan (JPN) | 5 | 2 | 3 | 10 |
| 2 | France (FRA)* | 5 | 1 | 6 | 12 |
| 3 | Netherlands (NED) | 1 | 1 | 1 | 3 |
| 4 | Mongolia (MGL) | 1 | 1 | 0 | 2 |
| 5 | South Korea (KOR) | 1 | 0 | 2 | 3 |
| 6 | Uzbekistan (UZB) | 1 | 0 | 1 | 2 |
| 7 | Hungary (HUN) | 0 | 2 | 2 | 4 |
| 8 | Armenia (ARM) | 0 | 2 | 0 | 2 |
| 9 | Brazil (BRA) | 0 | 1 | 2 | 3 |
| 10 | China (CHN) | 0 | 1 | 1 | 2 |
| 10 | Slovenia (SLO) | 0 | 1 | 1 | 2 |
| 12 | Algeria (ALG) | 0 | 1 | 0 | 1 |
| 12 | Germany (GER) | 0 | 1 | 0 | 1 |
| 14 | Cuba (CUB) | 0 | 0 | 3 | 3 |
| 15 | Georgia (GEO) | 0 | 0 | 1 | 1 |
| 15 | Latvia (LAT) | 0 | 0 | 1 | 1 |
| 15 | Portugal (POR) | 0 | 0 | 1 | 1 |
| 15 | Romania (ROU) | 0 | 0 | 1 | 1 |
| 15 | Spain (ESP) | 0 | 0 | 1 | 1 |
| 15 | Ukraine (UKR) | 0 | 0 | 1 | 1 |
| Totals (20 entries) | | 14 | 14 | 28 | 56 |
