= Victor Penalber =

Brazilian judoka (born 1990)

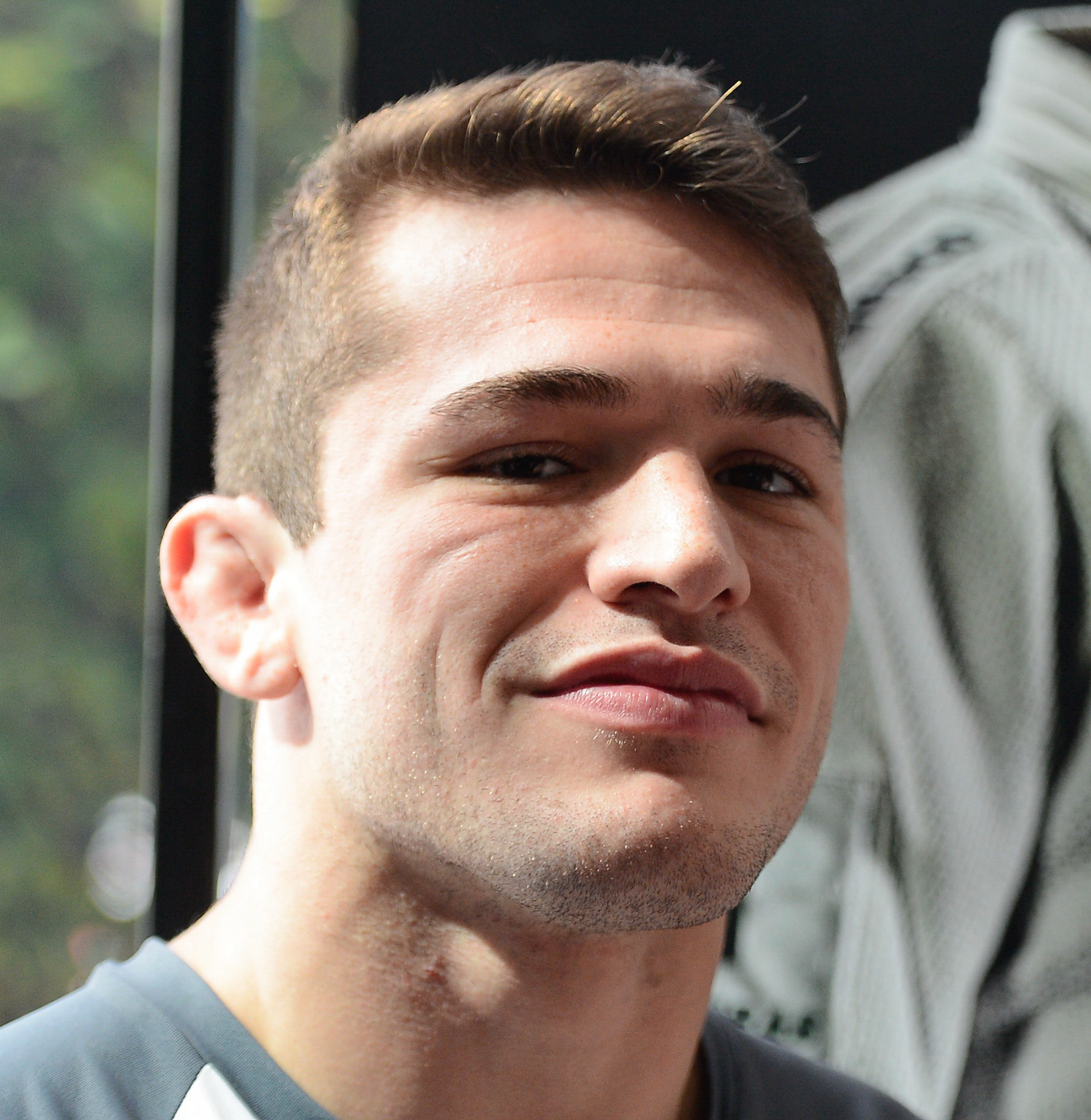
- Penalber in 2016

Personal information
- Full name: Victor Rodrigues Penalber de Oliveira
- Nationality: Brazilian
- Born: 22 May 1990 (age 36) Rio de Janeiro, Rio de Janeiro
- Occupation: Judoka
- Height: 175 cm (5 ft 9 in)

Sport
- Country: Brazil
- Sport: Judo
- Weight class: –81 kg
- Club: Instituto Reação
- Coached by: Geraldo Bernardes

Achievements and titles
- Olympic Games: R16 (2016)
- World Champ.: (bronze) (2015)
- Pan American Champ.: (2008, 2013, 2014, 2015)
Medal record
Men's judo
Representing Brazil
World Championships
Silver medal – second place	2017 Budapest	Mixed team
Bronze medal – third place	2015 Astana	‍–‍81 kg
Pan American Games
Bronze medal – third place	2015 Toronto	‍–‍81 kg
Pan American Championships
Gold medal – first place	2008 Miami	‍–‍73 kg
Gold medal – first place	2013 San José	‍–‍81 kg
Gold medal – first place	2014 Guayaquil	‍–‍81 kg
Gold medal – first place	2015 Edmonton	‍–‍81 kg
Bronze medal – third place	2016 Havana	‍–‍81 kg
World Masters
Bronze medal – third place	2013 Tyumen	‍–‍81 kg
IJF Grand Slam
Gold medal – first place	2012 Rio de Janeiro	‍–‍81 kg
Gold medal – first place	2014 Tyumen	‍–‍81 kg
Silver medal – second place	2016 Abu Dhabi	‍–‍81 kg
Bronze medal – third place	2012 Tokyo	‍–‍81 kg
Bronze medal – third place	2013 Paris	‍–‍81 kg
Bronze medal – third place	2016 Paris	‍–‍81 kg
IJF Grand Prix
Gold medal – first place	2012 Abu Dhabi	‍–‍81 kg
Gold medal – first place	2012 Qingdao	‍–‍81 kg
Gold medal – first place	2017 Tbilisi	‍–‍81 kg
Silver medal – second place	2018 Cancún	‍–‍81 kg
Bronze medal – third place	2017 Cancún	‍–‍81 kg
World Juniors Championships
Bronze medal – third place	2008 Bangkok	‍–‍73 kg
Summer Universiade
Bronze medal – third place	2011 Shenzhen	‍–‍81 kg

Profile at external databases
- IJF: 3944
- JudoInside.com: 46400
- Updated on 3 July 2023

Victor Rodrigues Penalber de Oliveira (born 22 May 1990) is a Brazilian judoka.

== Career ==
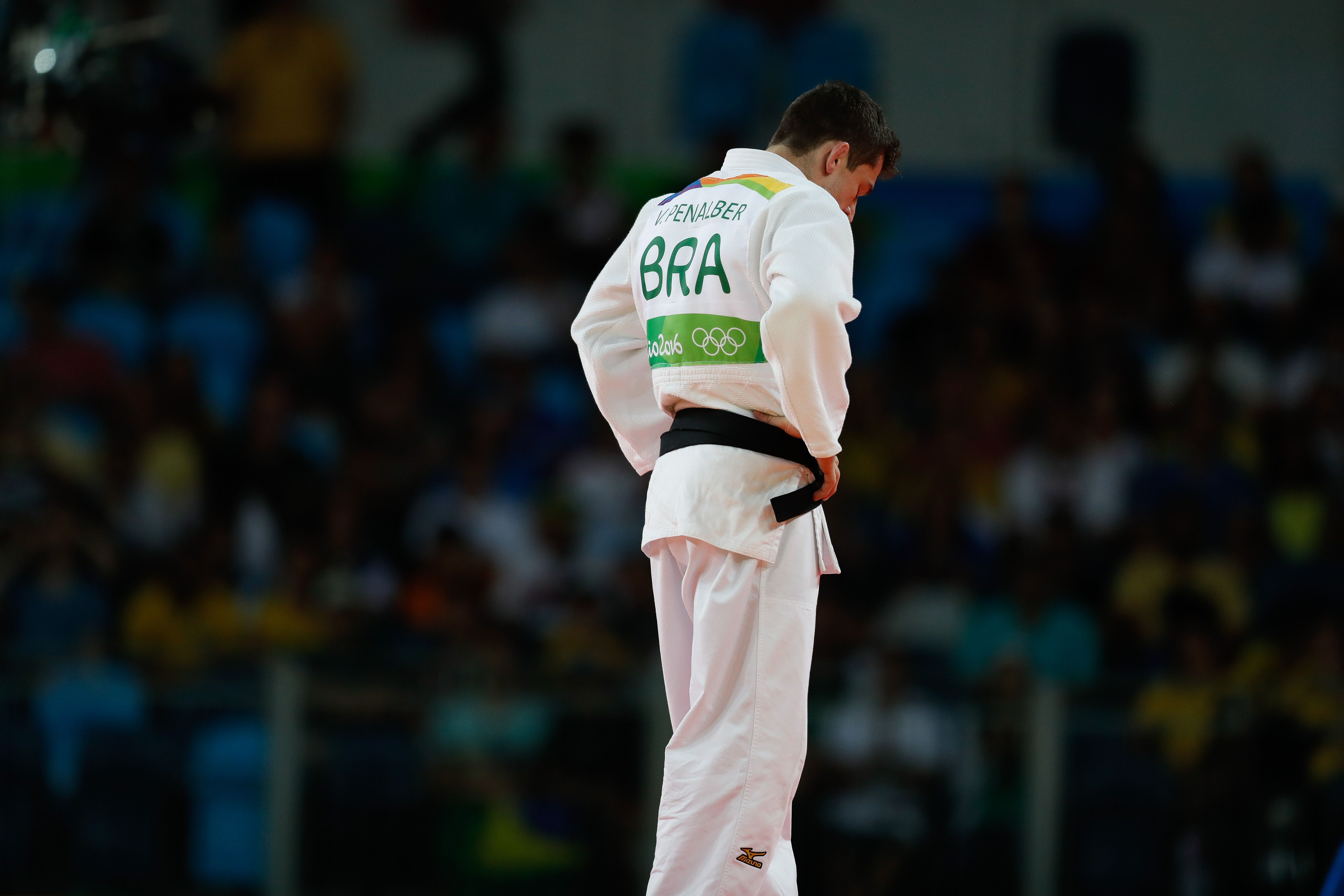
Victor Penalber

Penalber started to practice judo at the age of four. He studied and trained at Universidade Gama Filho, and today trains at the Instituto Reação, created by the ex-judoka Flávio Canto. He is left handed and his preferred technique is seoi-nage.

His first success was the gold medal at the 2008 Pan American Judo Championships at the 73 kg class; he won again in 2013 in the 81 kg class. At the 2008 World Judo Teams Championship in Tokyo he tested positive for furosemide and was suspended for two years.

Penalber competed at the 2013 World Judo Championships held in his home town, and lost his third bout to the eventual gold medalist Loïc Pietri. He won bronze medals at the 2015 World Judo Championships and 2015 Pan American Games.

Penalber competed at the 2016 Summer Olympics in the men's 81 kg event, in which he was eliminated in the third round by Sergiu Toma.

== Personal life ==
Wrestler Giullia Penalber is his sister. She also competed in judo before switching to freestyle wrestling.
