= 2010 Judo Grand Prix Tunis =

Judo competition

Judo 2010 Judo Grand Prix Tunis
- Location: Tunis, Tunisia
- Dates: 7–9 May 2010
- Competitors: 346 from 50 nations

Competition at external databases
- Links: IJF • EJU • JudoInside

The 2010 Judo Grand Prix Tunis was held in Tunis, Tunisia from 7 to 9 May 2010.

== Medal summary ==
=== Men's events ===
Event	Gold	Silver	Bronze
Extra-lightweight (−60 kg)	Rishod Sobirov (UZB)	Masaaki Fukuoka (JPN)	Anton Khoroshilov (RUS)
Extra-lightweight (−60 kg)	Rishod Sobirov (UZB)	Masaaki Fukuoka (JPN)	Georgii Zantaraia (UKR)
Half-lightweight (−66 kg)	Rok Drakšič (SLO)	Miklós Ungvári (HUN)	Florent Urani (FRA)
Half-lightweight (−66 kg)	Rok Drakšič (SLO)	Miklós Ungvári (HUN)	Dastan Ykybayev (KAZ)
Lightweight (−73 kg)	Volodymyr Soroka (UKR)	Hiroyuki Akimoto (JPN)	Murat Kodzokov (RUS)
Lightweight (−73 kg)	Volodymyr Soroka (UKR)	Hiroyuki Akimoto (JPN)	Dirk Van Tichelt (BEL)
Half-middleweight (−81 kg)	Ole Bischof (GER)	Leandro Guilheiro (BRA)	Guillaume Elmont (NED)
Half-middleweight (−81 kg)	Ole Bischof (GER)	Leandro Guilheiro (BRA)	Shokir Muminov (UZB)
Middleweight (−90 kg)	Takashi Ono (JPN)	Elkhan Mammadov (AZE)	Murat Gasiev (RUS)
Middleweight (−90 kg)	Takashi Ono (JPN)	Elkhan Mammadov (AZE)	Varlam Liparteliani (GEO)
Half-heavyweight (−100 kg)	Yauhen Biadulin (BLR)	Frédéric Stiegelmann (FRA)	Vyacheslav Denysov (UKR)
Half-heavyweight (−100 kg)	Yauhen Biadulin (BLR)	Frédéric Stiegelmann (FRA)	Levan Zhorzholiani (GEO)
Heavyweight (+100 kg)	Keiji Suzuki (JPN)	Barna Bor (HUN)	Kazuhiko Takahashi (JPN)
Heavyweight (+100 kg)	Keiji Suzuki (JPN)	Barna Bor (HUN)	Andreas Tölzer (GER)

=== Women's events ===
Event	Gold	Silver	Bronze
Extra-lightweight (−48 kg)	Alina Dumitru (ROU)	Laëtitia Payet (FRA)	Carmen Bogdan (ROU)
Extra-lightweight (−48 kg)	Alina Dumitru (ROU)	Laëtitia Payet (FRA)	Amélie Rosseneu (BEL)
Half-lightweight (−52 kg)	Majlinda Kelmendi (KOS)	Ana Carrascosa (ESP)	Kitty Bravik (NED)
Half-lightweight (−52 kg)	Majlinda Kelmendi (KOS)	Ana Carrascosa (ESP)	Laura Gómez (ESP)
Lightweight (−57 kg)	Automne Pavia (FRA)	Sabrina Filzmoser (AUT)	Corina Căprioriu (ROU)
Lightweight (−57 kg)	Automne Pavia (FRA)	Sabrina Filzmoser (AUT)	Miryam Roper (GER)
Half-middleweight (−63 kg)	Claudia Malzahn (GER)	Elisabeth Willeboordse (NED)	Anicka van Emden (NED)
Half-middleweight (−63 kg)	Claudia Malzahn (GER)	Elisabeth Willeboordse (NED)	Urška Žolnir (SLO)
Middleweight (−70 kg)	Haruka Tachimoto (JPN)	Raša Sraka (SLO)	Iljana Marzok (GER)
Middleweight (−70 kg)	Haruka Tachimoto (JPN)	Raša Sraka (SLO)	Houda Miled (TUN)
Half-heavyweight (−78 kg)	Audrey Tcheuméo (FRA)	Heide Wollert (GER)	Daria Pogorzelec (POL)
Half-heavyweight (−78 kg)	Audrey Tcheuméo (FRA)	Heide Wollert (GER)	Stéphanie Possamaï (FRA)
Heavyweight (+78 kg)	Lucija Polavder (SLO)	Nihel Cheikh Rouhou (TUN)	Lee Jung-eun (KOR)
Heavyweight (+78 kg)	Lucija Polavder (SLO)	Nihel Cheikh Rouhou (TUN)	Urszula Sadkowska (POL)

Source Results

=== Medal table ===
* Host nation (Tunisia)

Rank	Nation	Gold	Silver	Bronze	Total
1	Japan (JPN)	3	2	1	6
2	France (FRA)	2	2	2	6
3	Germany (GER)	2	1	3	6
4	Slovenia (SLO)	2	1	1	4
5	Romania (ROU)	1	0	2	3
5	Ukraine (UKR)	1	0	2	3
7	Uzbekistan (UZB)	1	0	1	2
8	Belarus (BLR)	1	0	0	1
8	Kosovo (KOS)	1	0	0	1
10	Hungary (HUN)	0	2	0	2
11	Netherlands (NED)	0	1	3	4
12	Spain (ESP)	0	1	1	2
12	Tunisia (TUN)*	0	1	1	2
14	Austria (AUT)	0	1	0	1
14	Azerbaijan (AZE)	0	1	0	1
14	Brazil (BRA)	0	1	0	1
17	Russia (RUS)	0	0	3	3
18	Belgium (BEL)	0	0	2	2
18	Georgia (GEO)	0	0	2	2
18	Poland (POL)	0	0	2	2
21	Kazakhstan (KAZ)	0	0	1	1
21	South Korea (KOR)	0	0	1	1
Totals (22 entries)		14	14	28	56
