= 2012 Judo Grand Prix Qingdao =

Judo competition

Judo 2012 Judo Grand Prix Qingdao
- Location: Qingdao, China
- Dates: 24–25 November 2012
- Competitors: 181 from 18 nations

Competition at external databases
- Links: IJF • JudoInside

The 2012 Judo Grand Prix Qingdao was held in Qingdao, China from 24 to 25 November 2012.

== Medal summary ==
=== Men's events ===
Event	Gold	Silver	Bronze
Extra-lightweight (−60 kg)	Ganboldyn Kherlen (MGL)	Dashdavaagiin Amartüvshin (MGL)	Choi Sung-yoon (KOR)
Extra-lightweight (−60 kg)	Ganboldyn Kherlen (MGL)	Dashdavaagiin Amartüvshin (MGL)	Robert Mshvidobadze (RUS)
Half-lightweight (−66 kg)	Davaadorjiin Tömörkhüleg (MGL)	Khishigbayar Buuveibaatar (MGL)	Kento Shimizu (JPN)
Half-lightweight (−66 kg)	Davaadorjiin Tömörkhüleg (MGL)	Khishigbayar Buuveibaatar (MGL)	Kamal Khan-Magomedov (RUS)
Lightweight (−73 kg)	Dirk Van Tichelt (BEL)	Rok Drakšič (SLO)	Saito Ryo (JPN)
Lightweight (−73 kg)	Dirk Van Tichelt (BEL)	Rok Drakšič (SLO)	Ganbaataryn Odbayar (MGL)
Half-middleweight (−81 kg)	Victor Penalber (BRA)	Murat Khabachirov (RUS)	Li Maojian (CHN)
Half-middleweight (−81 kg)	Victor Penalber (BRA)	Murat Khabachirov (RUS)	Otgonbaataryn Uuganbaatar (MGL)
Middleweight (−90 kg)	Cheng Xunzhao (CHN)	Zhang Jun (CHN)	Huh Chae-goo (KOR)
Middleweight (−90 kg)	Cheng Xunzhao (CHN)	Zhang Jun (CHN)	Kim Kwang-ho (KOR)
Half-heavyweight (−100 kg)	Yūsuke Kumashiro (JPN)	Renan Nunes (BRA)	Kim Do-hyoung (KOR)
Half-heavyweight (−100 kg)	Yūsuke Kumashiro (JPN)	Renan Nunes (BRA)	Yuan Jinling (CHN)
Heavyweight (+100 kg)	Marius Paškevičius (LTU)	Renat Saidov (RUS)	Quanchao Wang (CHN)
Heavyweight (+100 kg)	Marius Paškevičius (LTU)	Renat Saidov (RUS)	Wang Qiang (CHN)

=== Women's events ===
Event	Gold	Silver	Bronze
Extra-lightweight (−48 kg)	Amélie Rosseneu (BEL)	Chung Jung-yeon (KOR)	Sa Han (CHN)
Extra-lightweight (−48 kg)	Amélie Rosseneu (BEL)	Chung Jung-yeon (KOR)	Gabriela Chibana (BRA)
Half-lightweight (−52 kg)	Ma Yingnan (CHN)	Érika Miranda (BRA)	Mönkhbatyn Urantsetseg (MGL)
Half-lightweight (−52 kg)	Ma Yingnan (CHN)	Érika Miranda (BRA)	Ilse Heylen (BEL)
Lightweight (−57 kg)	Dorjsürengiin Sumiyaa (MGL)	Ketleyn Quadros (BRA)	Vesna Đukić (SLO)
Lightweight (−57 kg)	Dorjsürengiin Sumiyaa (MGL)	Ketleyn Quadros (BRA)	Liu Yang (CHN)
Half-middleweight (−63 kg)	Miki Tanaka (JPN)	Martyna Trajdos (GER)	Tina Trstenjak (SLO)
Half-middleweight (−63 kg)	Miki Tanaka (JPN)	Martyna Trajdos (GER)	Gemma Howell (GBR)
Middleweight (−70 kg)	Chen Fei (CHN)	Maria Portela (BRA)	Laura Vargas Koch (GER)
Middleweight (−70 kg)	Chen Fei (CHN)	Maria Portela (BRA)	Zhou Chao (CHN)
Half-heavyweight (−78 kg)	Anamari Velenšek (SLO)	Jung Da-woon (KOR)	Li Han (CHN)
Half-heavyweight (−78 kg)	Anamari Velenšek (SLO)	Jung Da-woon (KOR)	Misaki Hidaka (JPN)
Heavyweight (+78 kg)	Yu Song (CHN)	Qin Qian (CHN)	Li Yang (CHN)
Heavyweight (+78 kg)	Yu Song (CHN)	Qin Qian (CHN)	Wang Rui (CHN)

Source Results

=== Medal table ===
* Host nation (China)

Rank	Nation	Gold	Silver	Bronze	Total
1	China (CHN)*	4	2	10	16
2	Mongolia (MGL)	3	2	3	8
3	Japan (JPN)	2	0	3	5
4	Belgium (BEL)	2	0	1	3
5	Brazil (BRA)	1	4	1	6
6	Slovenia (SLO)	1	1	2	4
7	Lithuania (LTU)	1	0	0	1
8	South Korea (KOR)	0	2	4	6
9	Russia (RUS)	0	2	2	4
10	Germany (GER)	0	1	1	2
11	Great Britain (GBR)	0	0	1	1
Totals (11 entries)		14	14	28	56
