= 2013 Judo Grand Slam Paris =

Judo competition

Judo 2013 Judo Grand Slam Paris
- Venue: Accor Arena
- Location: Paris, France
- Dates: 9–10 February 2013
- Competitors: 387 from 54 nations

Competition at external databases
- Links: IJF • EJU • JudoInside

The 2013 Judo Grand Slam Paris was held in Paris, France, from 9 to 10 February 2013.

== Medal summary ==
=== Men's events ===
Event	Gold	Silver	Bronze
Extra-lightweight (−60 kg)	Naohisa Takato (JPN)	Jin-Min Jang (KOR)	Amiran Papinashvili (GEO)
Extra-lightweight (−60 kg)	Naohisa Takato (JPN)	Jin-Min Jang (KOR)	Beslan Mudranov (RUS)
Half-lightweight (−66 kg)	David Larose (FRA)	Davaadorjiin Tömörkhüleg (MGL)	Cho Jun-ho (KOR)
Half-lightweight (−66 kg)	David Larose (FRA)	Davaadorjiin Tömörkhüleg (MGL)	Tomofumi Takajo (JPN)
Lightweight (−73 kg)	Khashbaataryn Tsagaanbaatar (MGL)	Bruno Mendonça (BRA)	Dex Elmont (NED)
Lightweight (−73 kg)	Khashbaataryn Tsagaanbaatar (MGL)	Bruno Mendonça (BRA)	Shohei Ono (JPN)
Half-middleweight (−81 kg)	Yakhyo Imamov (UZB)	Avtandili Tchrikishvili (GEO)	Keita Nagashima (JPN)
Half-middleweight (−81 kg)	Yakhyo Imamov (UZB)	Avtandili Tchrikishvili (GEO)	Victor Penalber (BRA)
Middleweight (−90 kg)	Varlam Liparteliani (GEO)	Asley González (CUB)	Dilshod Choriev (UZB)
Middleweight (−90 kg)	Varlam Liparteliani (GEO)	Asley González (CUB)	Hirotaka Kato (JPN)
Half-heavyweight (−100 kg)	Lukáš Krpálek (CZE)	Battulgyn Temüülen (MGL)	Henk Grol (NED)
Half-heavyweight (−100 kg)	Lukáš Krpálek (CZE)	Battulgyn Temüülen (MGL)	Cyrille Maret (FRA)
Heavyweight (+100 kg)	Teddy Riner (FRA)	Kim Sung-min (KOR)	Rafael Silva (BRA)
Heavyweight (+100 kg)	Teddy Riner (FRA)	Kim Sung-min (KOR)	Cho Gu-ham (KOR)

=== Women's events ===
Event	Gold	Silver	Bronze
Extra-lightweight (−48 kg)	Haruna Asami (JPN)	Laëtitia Payet (FRA)	Mönkhbatyn Urantsetseg (MGL)
Extra-lightweight (−48 kg)	Haruna Asami (JPN)	Laëtitia Payet (FRA)	Maria Celia Laborde (CUB)
Half-lightweight (−52 kg)	Yuki Hashimoto (JPN)	Majlinda Kelmendi (KOS)	Andreea Chițu (ROU)
Half-lightweight (−52 kg)	Yuki Hashimoto (JPN)	Majlinda Kelmendi (KOS)	Takumi Miyakawa (JPN)
Lightweight (−57 kg)	Automne Pavia (FRA)	Anzu Yamamoto (JPN)	Nae Udaka (JPN)
Lightweight (−57 kg)	Automne Pavia (FRA)	Anzu Yamamoto (JPN)	Loredana Ohai (ROU)
Half-middleweight (−63 kg)	Clarisse Agbegnenou (FRA)	Anicka van Emden (NED)	Miki Tanaka (JPN)
Half-middleweight (−63 kg)	Clarisse Agbegnenou (FRA)	Anicka van Emden (NED)	Kana Abe (JPN)
Middleweight (−70 kg)	Kim Polling (NED)	Kelita Zupancic (CAN)	Lucie Décosse (FRA)
Middleweight (−70 kg)	Kim Polling (NED)	Kelita Zupancic (CAN)	Laura Vargas Koch (GER)
Half-heavyweight (−78 kg)	Lucie Louette (FRA)	Akari Ogata (JPN)	Ruika Sato (JPN)
Half-heavyweight (−78 kg)	Lucie Louette (FRA)	Akari Ogata (JPN)	Catherine Roberge (CAN)
Heavyweight (+78 kg)	Megumi Tachimoto (JPN)	Idalys Ortiz (CUB)	Kim Ji-youn (KOR)
Heavyweight (+78 kg)	Megumi Tachimoto (JPN)	Idalys Ortiz (CUB)	Kim Min-jeong (KOR)

Source Results

=== Medal table ===
* Host nation (France)

Rank	Nation	Gold	Silver	Bronze	Total
1	France (FRA)*	5	1	2	8
2	Japan (JPN)	4	2	9	15
3	Mongolia (MGL)	1	2	1	4
4	Netherlands (NED)	1	1	2	4
5	Georgia (GEO)	1	1	1	3
6	Uzbekistan (UZB)	1	0	1	2
7	Czech Republic (CZE)	1	0	0	1
8	South Korea (KOR)	0	2	4	6
9	Cuba (CUB)	0	2	1	3
10	Brazil (BRA)	0	1	2	3
11	Canada (CAN)	0	1	1	2
12	Kosovo (KOS)	0	1	0	1
13	Romania (ROU)	0	0	2	2
14	Germany (GER)	0	0	1	1
14	Russia (RUS)	0	0	1	1
Totals (15 entries)		14	14	28	56
