= Sarah Menezes =

Brazilian judoka (born 1990)

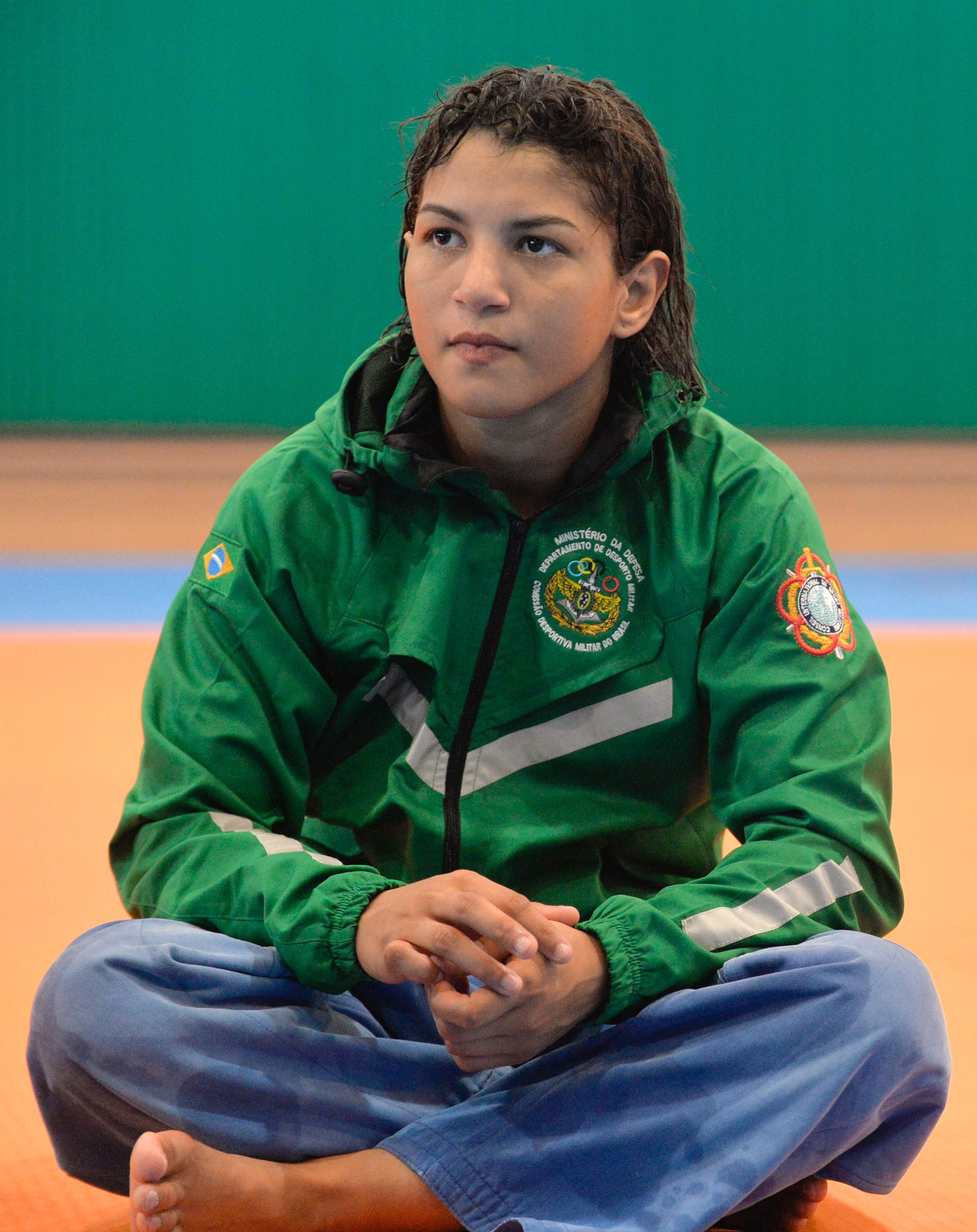
- Menezes at the 2015 Military World Games

Personal information
- Full name: Sarah Gabrielle Cabral de Menezes
- Born: 26 March 1990 (age 36) Teresina, Piauí, Brazil
- Occupation: Judoka
- Height: 155 cm (5 ft 1 in)

Sport
- Country: Brazil
- Sport: Judo
- Weight class: –48 kg, –52 kg
- Club: Associação de Judô Expedito Falcão
- Coached by: Expedito Falcão

Achievements and titles
- Olympic Games: (gold) (2012)
- World Champ.: (bronze) (2010, 2011, 2013)
- Pan American Champ.: (2010, 2013, 2015, 2016)
Medal record
Women's judo
Representing Brazil
Olympic Games
Gold medal – first place	2012 London	‍–‍48 kg
World Championships
Bronze medal – third place	2010 Tokyo	‍–‍48 kg
Bronze medal – third place	2011 Paris	‍–‍48 kg
Bronze medal – third place	2013 Rio de Janeiro	‍–‍48 kg
Pan American Games
Bronze medal – third place	2011 Guadalajara	‍–‍48 kg
Pan American Championships
Gold medal – first place	2010 San Salvador	‍–‍48 kg
Gold medal – first place	2013 San José	‍–‍48 kg
Gold medal – first place	2015 Edmonton	‍–‍48 kg
Gold medal – first place	2016 Havana	‍–‍48 kg
Silver medal – second place	2012 Montreal	‍–‍48 kg
Silver medal – second place	2014 Guayaquil	‍–‍48 kg
Bronze medal – third place	2005 Caguas (PUR)	‍–‍44 kg
Bronze medal – third place	2009 Buenos Aires	‍–‍48 kg
Bronze medal – third place	2019 Lima	‍–‍52 kg
World Masters
Silver medal – second place	2013 Tyumen	‍–‍48 kg
Silver medal – second place	2016 Guadalajara	‍–‍48 kg
Bronze medal – third place	2011 Baku	‍–‍48 kg
Bronze medal – third place	2012 Almaty	‍–‍48 kg
IJF Grand Slam
Gold medal – first place	2012 Moscow	‍–‍48 kg
Gold medal – first place	2013 Moscow	‍–‍48 kg
Gold medal – first place	2014 Tyumen	‍–‍48 kg
Silver medal – second place	2011 Rio de Janeiro	‍–‍48 kg
Silver medal – second place	2012 Paris	‍–‍48 kg
Bronze medal – third place	2009 Rio de Janeiro	‍–‍48 kg
Bronze medal – third place	2009 Tokyo	‍–‍48 kg
Bronze medal – third place	2010 Tokyo	‍–‍48 kg
Bronze medal – third place	2011 Paris	‍–‍48 kg
Bronze medal – third place	2013 Tokyo	‍–‍48 kg
Bronze medal – third place	2015 Tokyo	‍–‍48 kg
Bronze medal – third place	2016 Paris	‍–‍48 kg
IJF Grand Prix
Gold medal – first place	2016 Havana	‍–‍48 kg
Silver medal – second place	2017 Cancún	‍–‍52 kg
Bronze medal – third place	2014 Havana	‍–‍48 kg
Bronze medal – third place	2016 Samsun	‍–‍48 kg
Bronze medal – third place	2018 Tbilisi	‍–‍48 kg
Bronze medal – third place	2018 Antalya	‍–‍48 kg
Bronze medal – third place	2019 Montreal	‍–‍52 kg
World Juniors Championships
Gold medal – first place	2008 Bangkok	‍–‍48 kg
Gold medal – first place	2009 Paris	‍–‍48 kg
Military World Games
Gold medal – first place	2015 Mungyeong	Team
Bronze medal – third place	2015 Mungyeong	‍–‍48 kg

Profile at external databases
- IJF: 436
- JudoInside.com: 43111
- Updated on 25 May 2023

Sarah Gabrielle Cabral de Menezes (born 26 March 1990) is a judoka from Brazil. In 2012, she became the first Brazilian woman to win an Olympic gold medal in judo, after defeating the reigning Olympic champion Alina Dumitru. She also competed at the 2008 and 2016 Summer Olympics.

Menezes won her first major medal by claiming bronze at the World Judo Championships in Tokyo in September 2010.

Menezes retired in 2020, as she got pregnant from French judoka Loic Pietri, and their daughter was born in May 2021. In 2021, she was approached by the Brazilian Judo Confederation to coach the national team. In the 2024 Summer Olympics, Menezes coached Larissa Pimenta to a bronze medal and Beatriz Souza to the gold.
