= 2012 Judo Grand Slam Tokyo =

Judo competition

Judo 2012 Judo Grand Slam Tokyo
- Location: Tokyo, Japan
- Dates: 30 November – 2 December 2012
- Competitors: 268 from 36 nations

Competition at external databases
- Links: IJF • EJU • JudoInside

The 2012 Judo Grand Slam Tokyo was held in Tokyo, Japan, from 30 November to 2 December 2012.

== Medal summary ==
=== Men's events ===
Event	Gold	Silver	Bronze
Extra-lightweight (−60 kg)	Naohisa Takato (JPN)	Hironori Ishikawa (JPN)	Felipe Kitadai (BRA)
Extra-lightweight (−60 kg)	Naohisa Takato (JPN)	Hironori Ishikawa (JPN)	Sofiane Milous (FRA)
Half-lightweight (−66 kg)	Junpei Morishita (JPN)	David Larose (FRA)	Mikhail Pulyaev (RUS)
Half-lightweight (−66 kg)	Junpei Morishita (JPN)	David Larose (FRA)	Tomofumi Takajo (JPN)
Lightweight (−73 kg)	Shohei Ono (JPN)	Riki Nakaya (JPN)	Khashbaataryn Tsagaanbaatar (MGL)
Lightweight (−73 kg)	Shohei Ono (JPN)	Riki Nakaya (JPN)	Yuki Nishiyama (JPN)
Half-middleweight (−81 kg)	Kim Jae-bum (KOR)	Ivan Vorobev (RUS)	Tomohiro Kawakami (JPN)
Half-middleweight (−81 kg)	Kim Jae-bum (KOR)	Ivan Vorobev (RUS)	Victor Penalber (BRA)
Middleweight (−90 kg)	Lee Kyu-won (KOR)	Masashi Nishiyama (JPN)	Islam Bozbayev (KAZ)
Middleweight (−90 kg)	Lee Kyu-won (KOR)	Masashi Nishiyama (JPN)	Shohei Shimowada (JPN)
Half-heavyweight (−100 kg)	Daisuke Kobayashi (JPN)	Ilias Iliadis (GRE)	Battulgyn Temüülen (MGL)
Half-heavyweight (−100 kg)	Daisuke Kobayashi (JPN)	Ilias Iliadis (GRE)	Maxim Rakov (KAZ)
Heavyweight (+100 kg)	Kim Sung-min (KOR)	Rafael Silva (BRA)	Jean-Sébastien Bonvoisin (FRA)
Heavyweight (+100 kg)	Kim Sung-min (KOR)	Rafael Silva (BRA)	Ryu Shichinohe (JPN)

=== Women's events ===
Event	Gold	Silver	Bronze
Extra-lightweight (−48 kg)	Haruna Asami (JPN)	Dayaris Mestre Álvarez (CUB)	Jeong Bo-kyeong (KOR)
Extra-lightweight (−48 kg)	Haruna Asami (JPN)	Dayaris Mestre Álvarez (CUB)	Amélie Rosseneu (BEL)
Half-lightweight (−52 kg)	Yuki Hashimoto (JPN)	Nodoka Tanimoto (JPN)	Yanet Bermoy (CUB)
Half-lightweight (−52 kg)	Yuki Hashimoto (JPN)	Nodoka Tanimoto (JPN)	Takumi Miyakawa (JPN)
Lightweight (−57 kg)	Anzu Yamamoto (JPN)	Nozomi Hirai (JPN)	Lien Chen-ling (TPE)
Lightweight (−57 kg)	Anzu Yamamoto (JPN)	Nozomi Hirai (JPN)	Automne Pavia (FRA)
Half-middleweight (−63 kg)	Megumi Tsugane (JPN)	Kana Abe (JPN)	Maricet Espinosa (CUB)
Half-middleweight (−63 kg)	Megumi Tsugane (JPN)	Kana Abe (JPN)	Rafaela Silva (BRA)
Middleweight (−70 kg)	Linda Bolder (NED)	Haruka Tachimoto (JPN)	Hwang Ye-sul (KOR)
Middleweight (−70 kg)	Linda Bolder (NED)	Haruka Tachimoto (JPN)	Yuko Imai (JPN)
Half-heavyweight (−78 kg)	Ruika Sato (JPN)	Akari Ogata (JPN)	Amy Cotton (CAN)
Half-heavyweight (−78 kg)	Ruika Sato (JPN)	Akari Ogata (JPN)	Yoon Hyun-ji (KOR)
Heavyweight (+78 kg)	Megumi Tachimoto (JPN)	Idalys Ortiz (CUB)	Maria Suelen Altheman (BRA)
Heavyweight (+78 kg)	Megumi Tachimoto (JPN)	Idalys Ortiz (CUB)	Sarah Asahina (JPN)

Source Results

=== Medal table ===
* Host nation (Japan)

Rank	Nation	Gold	Silver	Bronze	Total
1	Japan (JPN)*	10	8	8	26
2	South Korea (KOR)	3	0	3	6
3	Netherlands (NED)	1	0	0	1
4	Cuba (CUB)	0	2	2	4
5	Brazil (BRA)	0	1	4	5
6	France (FRA)	0	1	3	4
7	Russia (RUS)	0	1	1	2
8	Greece (GRE)	0	1	0	1
9	Kazakhstan (KAZ)	0	0	2	2
9	Mongolia (MGL)	0	0	2	2
11	Belgium (BEL)	0	0	1	1
11	Canada (CAN)	0	0	1	1
11	Chinese Taipei (TPE)	0	0	1	1
Totals (13 entries)		14	14	28	56
