= 2010 Judo Grand Slam Moscow =

Judo competition

Judo 2010 Judo Grand Slam Moscow
- Location: Moscow, Russia
- Dates: 3–4 July 2010
- Competitors: 488 from 53 nations

Competition at external databases
- Links: IJF • JudoInside

The 2010 Judo Grand Slam Moscow was held in Moscow, Russia, from 3 to 4 July 2010.

== Medal summary ==
=== Men's events ===
Event	Gold	Silver	Bronze
Extra-lightweight (−60 kg)	Rishod Sobirov (UZB)	Jeroen Mooren (NED)	Dashdavaagiin Amartüvshin (MGL)
Extra-lightweight (−60 kg)	Rishod Sobirov (UZB)	Jeroen Mooren (NED)	Elio Verde (ITA)
Half-lightweight (−66 kg)	Musa Mogushkov (RUS)	Kim Joo-jin (KOR)	Alim Gadanov (RUS)
Half-lightweight (−66 kg)	Musa Mogushkov (RUS)	Kim Joo-jin (KOR)	Miklós Ungvári (HUN)
Lightweight (−73 kg)	Benjamin Darbelet (FRA)	Bang Gui-man (KOR)	Yasuhiro Awano (JPN)
Lightweight (−73 kg)	Benjamin Darbelet (FRA)	Bang Gui-man (KOR)	Bruno Mendonça (BRA)
Half-middleweight (−81 kg)	Ivan Nifontov (RUS)	Song Dae-nam (KOR)	Ole Bischof (GER)
Half-middleweight (−81 kg)	Ivan Nifontov (RUS)	Song Dae-nam (KOR)	Flávio Canto (BRA)
Middleweight (−90 kg)	Takashi Ono (JPN)	Daiki Nishiyama (JPN)	Karolis Bauža (LTU)
Middleweight (−90 kg)	Takashi Ono (JPN)	Daiki Nishiyama (JPN)	Dilshod Choriev (UZB)
Half-heavyweight (−100 kg)	Luciano Corrêa (BRA)	Tagir Khaybulaev (RUS)	Takamasa Anai (JPN)
Half-heavyweight (−100 kg)	Luciano Corrêa (BRA)	Tagir Khaybulaev (RUS)	Thierry Fabre (FRA)
Heavyweight (+100 kg)	Islam El Shehaby (EGY)	Barna Bor (HUN)	Stanislav Bondarenko (UKR)
Heavyweight (+100 kg)	Islam El Shehaby (EGY)	Barna Bor (HUN)	Kim Soo-whan (KOR)

=== Women's events ===
Event	Gold	Silver	Bronze
Extra-lightweight (−48 kg)	Emi Yamagishi (JPN)	Chung Jung-yeon (KOR)	Laëtitia Payet (FRA)
Extra-lightweight (−48 kg)	Emi Yamagishi (JPN)	Chung Jung-yeon (KOR)	Amélie Rosseneu (BEL)
Half-lightweight (−52 kg)	Yuka Nishida (JPN)	Joana Ramos (POR)	Laura Gómez (ESP)
Half-lightweight (−52 kg)	Yuka Nishida (JPN)	Joana Ramos (POR)	Natalia Kuziutina (RUS)
Lightweight (−57 kg)	Sabrina Filzmoser (AUT)	Marlen Hein (GER)	Telma Monteiro (POR)
Lightweight (−57 kg)	Sabrina Filzmoser (AUT)	Marlen Hein (GER)	Viola Wächter (GER)
Half-middleweight (−63 kg)	Gévrise Émane (FRA)	Anicka van Emden (NED)	Claudia Malzahn (GER)
Half-middleweight (−63 kg)	Gévrise Émane (FRA)	Anicka van Emden (NED)	Johanna Ylinen (FIN)
Middleweight (−70 kg)	Anett Mészáros (HUN)	Edith Bosch (NED)	Mylène Chollet (FRA)
Middleweight (−70 kg)	Anett Mészáros (HUN)	Edith Bosch (NED)	Hwang Ye-sul (KOR)
Half-heavyweight (−78 kg)	Yang Xiuli (CHN)	Audrey Tcheuméo (FRA)	Abigél Joó (HUN)
Half-heavyweight (−78 kg)	Yang Xiuli (CHN)	Audrey Tcheuméo (FRA)	Tomomi Okamura (JPN)
Heavyweight (+78 kg)	Maki Tsukada (JPN)	Megumi Tachimoto (JPN)	Qin Qian (CHN)
Heavyweight (+78 kg)	Maki Tsukada (JPN)	Megumi Tachimoto (JPN)	Urszula Sadkowska (POL)

Source Results

=== Medal table ===
* Host nation (Russia)

Rank	Nation	Gold	Silver	Bronze	Total
1	Japan (JPN)	4	2	3	9
2	France (FRA)	2	1	3	6
3	Russia (RUS)*	2	1	2	5
4	Hungary (HUN)	1	1	2	4
5	Brazil (BRA)	1	0	2	3
6	China (CHN)	1	0	1	2
6	Uzbekistan (UZB)	1	0	1	2
8	Austria (AUT)	1	0	0	1
8	Egypt (EGY)	1	0	0	1
10	South Korea (KOR)	0	4	2	6
11	Netherlands (NED)	0	3	0	3
12	Germany (GER)	0	1	3	4
13	Portugal (POR)	0	1	1	2
14	Belgium (BEL)	0	0	1	1
14	Finland (FIN)	0	0	1	1
14	Italy (ITA)	0	0	1	1
14	Lithuania (LTU)	0	0	1	1
14	Mongolia (MGL)	0	0	1	1
14	Poland (POL)	0	0	1	1
14	Spain (ESP)	0	0	1	1
14	Ukraine (UKR)	0	0	1	1
Totals (21 entries)		14	14	28	56
