= 2009 European U23 Judo Championships =

Judo competition

Judo 2009 European U23 Judo Championships
- Location: Antalya, Turkey
- Dates: 20–22 November 2009

Competition at external databases
- Links: EJU • JudoInside

The 2009 European U23 Judo Championships is an edition of the European U23 Judo Championships, organised by the European Judo Union. It was held in Antalya, Turkey from 20 to 22 November 2009.

== Medal summary ==
=== Medal table ===
* Host nation (Turkey)

Rank	Nation	Gold	Silver	Bronze	Total
1	Russia (RUS)	3	1	4	8
2	France (FRA)	2	1	2	5
3	Germany (GER)	2	0	1	3
4	Italy (ITA)	2	0	0	2
5	Hungary (HUN)	1	2	2	5
6	Georgia (GEO)	1	0	1	2
6	Lithuania (LTU)	1	0	1	2
6	Slovenia (SLO)	1	0	1	2
9	Israel (ISR)	1	0	0	1
10	Ukraine (UKR)	0	3	2	5
11	Netherlands (NED)	0	2	1	3
12	Romania (ROU)	0	2	0	2
13	Poland (POL)	0	1	1	2
13	Turkey (TUR)*	0	1	1	2
15	Slovakia (SVK)	0	1	0	1
16	Belgium (BEL)	0	0	3	3
17	Great Britain (GBR)	0	0	2	2
18	Austria (AUT)	0	0	1	1
18	Azerbaijan (AZE)	0	0	1	1
18	Belarus (BLR)	0	0	1	1
18	Bosnia and Herzegovina (BIH)	0	0	1	1
18	Czech Republic (CZE)	0	0	1	1
18	Spain (ESP)	0	0	1	1
Totals (23 entries)		14	14	28	56

=== Men's events ===
Event	Gold	Silver	Bronze
Extra-lightweight (−60 kg)	Paata Merebashvili (GEO)	Robert Mshvidobadze (RUS)	Ashley McKenzie (GBR)
Extra-lightweight (−60 kg)	Paata Merebashvili (GEO)	Robert Mshvidobadze (RUS)	Julien Ottaviani (FRA)
Half-lightweight (−66 kg)	Rok Drakšič (SLO)	Paweł Zagrodnik (POL)	Musa Mogushkov (RUS)
Half-lightweight (−66 kg)	Rok Drakšič (SLO)	Paweł Zagrodnik (POL)	Dzmitry Shershan (BLR)
Lightweight (−73 kg)	Ugo Legrand (FRA)	Attila Ungvári (HUN)	Zviad Bazandarashvili (GEO)
Lightweight (−73 kg)	Ugo Legrand (FRA)	Attila Ungvári (HUN)	Joachim Bottieau (BEL)
Half-middleweight (−81 kg)	Sven Maresch (GER)	Szabolcs Krizsán (HUN)	Sirazhudin Magomedov (RUS)
Half-middleweight (−81 kg)	Sven Maresch (GER)	Szabolcs Krizsán (HUN)	Aljaž Sedej (SLO)
Middleweight (−90 kg)	Karolis Bauža (LTU)	Milan Randl (SVK)	Marvin De la Croes (NED)
Middleweight (−90 kg)	Karolis Bauža (LTU)	Milan Randl (SVK)	Max Schirnhofer (AUT)
Half-heavyweight (−100 kg)	Zafar Makhmadov (RUS)	Daniel Matei (ROU)	Rafal Filek (POL)
Half-heavyweight (−100 kg)	Zafar Makhmadov (RUS)	Daniel Matei (ROU)	Razmik Tonoyan (UKR)
Heavyweight (+100 kg)	Soslan Dzhanaev (RUS)	Thomas Sinsou (FRA)	Stanislav Bondarenko (UKR)
Heavyweight (+100 kg)	Soslan Dzhanaev (RUS)	Thomas Sinsou (FRA)	Victor Canseco (ESP)

=== Women's events ===
Event	Gold	Silver	Bronze
Extra-lightweight (−48 kg)	Elena Moretti (ITA)	Birgit Ente (NED)	Amelie Rosseneu (BEL)
Extra-lightweight (−48 kg)	Elena Moretti (ITA)	Birgit Ente (NED)	Kubra Tekneci (TUR)
Half-lightweight (−52 kg)	Natalia Kuziutina (RUS)	Tuğba Zehir (TUR)	Lucie Chytrá (CZE)
Half-lightweight (−52 kg)	Natalia Kuziutina (RUS)	Tuğba Zehir (TUR)	Barbara Maros (HUN)
Lightweight (−57 kg)	Hannah Brueck (GER)	Andreea Chițu (ROU)	Julie Baeyens (BEL)
Lightweight (−57 kg)	Hannah Brueck (GER)	Andreea Chițu (ROU)	Irina Zabludina (RUS)
Half-middleweight (−63 kg)	Alice Schlesinger (ISR)	Oksana Didenko (UKR)	Eszter Gáspár (HUN)
Half-middleweight (−63 kg)	Alice Schlesinger (ISR)	Oksana Didenko (UKR)	Ramila Yusubova (AZE)
Middleweight (−70 kg)	Abigél Joó (HUN)	Linda Bolder (NED)	Gemma Gibbons (GBR)
Middleweight (−70 kg)	Abigél Joó (HUN)	Linda Bolder (NED)	Lucile Perrotte (FRA)
Half-heavyweight (−78 kg)	Audrey Tcheuméo (FRA)	Luiza Gainutdinova (UKR)	Raimonda Gedutyte (LTU)
Half-heavyweight (−78 kg)	Audrey Tcheuméo (FRA)	Luiza Gainutdinova (UKR)	Annika Heise (GER)
Heavyweight (+78 kg)	Lucia Tangorre (ITA)	Svitlana Iaromka (UKR)	Polina Belousova (RUS)
Heavyweight (+78 kg)	Lucia Tangorre (ITA)	Svitlana Iaromka (UKR)	Larisa Cerić (BIH)

Source Results
