= Judo at the 2012 Summer Olympics – Women's 48 kg =

Women's 48kg at the Games of the XXX Olympiad
- Venue: ExCeL Exhibition Centre
- Date: 28 July 2012
- Competitors: 19 from 19 nations

Medalists
| 1st place, gold medalist(s) | | Sarah Menezes | Brazil |
| 2nd place, silver medalist(s) | | Alina Dumitru | Romania |
| 3rd place, bronze medalist(s) | | Charline Van Snick | Belgium |
| 3rd place, bronze medalist(s) | | Éva Csernoviczki | Hungary |

Women's 48 kg competition in judo at the 2012 Summer Olympics occurred at ExCeL London in London.

The gold and silver medals were determined by a single-elimination tournament, with the winner of the final taking gold and the loser receiving silver. Judo events awarded two bronze medals. Quarterfinal losers competed in a repechage match for the right to face a semifinal loser for a bronze medal (that is, the judokas defeated in quarterfinals A and B competed against each other, with the winner of that match facing the semifinal loser from the other half of the bracket).

== Schedule ==
All times are British Summer Time (UTC+1)

| Date | Time | Round |
|---|---|---|
| Saturday, 28 July 2012 | 09:30; 14:00; 16:10 | Qualifications; Semifinals; Final |

== Results ==
=== Finals ===
Semi-finals
Tomoko Fukumi (JPN) | 001
Alina Dumitru (ROU) | 010
Sarah Menezes (BRA) | 001
Charline Van Snick (BEL) | 000

Final
Alina Dumitru (ROU) | 000
Sarah Menezes (BRA) | 011

=== Repechages ===
| Repechage | | Bronze medal |
| Paula Pareto (ARG) | 001 |
| Mönkhbatyn Urantsetseg (MGL) | 000 | Paula Pareto (ARG) | 000 |
| | | Charline Van Snick (BEL) | 001 |

| Repechage | | Bronze medal |
| Wu Shugen (CHN) | 000 |
| Éva Csernoviczki (HUN) | 101 | Éva Csernoviczki (HUN) | 100 |
| | | Tomoko Fukumi (JPN) | 000 |

=== Pool A ===
First Round
Tomoko Fukumi (JPN) | 100
Oiana Blanco (ESP) | 000

Second Round
Tomoko Fukumi (JPN) | 020
Kelly Edwards (GBR) | 000
Paula Pareto (ARG) | 001
Elena Moretti (ITA) | 000

Quarterfinals
Tomoko Fukumi (JPN) | 001
Paula Pareto (ARG) | 000

=== Pool B ===
| First Round | | Second Round | | Quarterfinals |
| | | Alina Dumitru (ROU) | 100 |
| Dayaris Mestre Álvarez (CUB) | 010 | Dayaris Mestre Álvarez (CUB) | 000H |
| Nataliya Kondratyeva (RUS) | 000 | | | Alina Dumitru (ROU) | 011 |
| | | | | Mönkhbatyn Urantsetseg (MGL) | 001 |
| | | Mönkhbatyn Urantsetseg (MGL) | 010 |
| | | Alexandra Podryadova (KAZ) | 000 |

=== Pool C ===
First Round
Sarah Menezes (BRA) | 002
Văn Ngọc Tú (VIE) | 000

Second Round
Sarah Menezes (BRA) | 001
Laëtitia Payet (FRA) | 000
Wu Shugen (CHN) | 101
Lisa Kearney (IRL) | 001

Quarterfinals
Sarah Menezes (BRA) | 001
Wu Shugen (CHN) | 000

=== Pool D ===
| First Round | Second Round | | Quarterfinals |
| | Charline Van Snick (BEL) | 100 |
| | Chung Jung-yeon (KOR) | 000 |
| | | | Charline Van Snick (BEL) | 100 |
| | | | Éva Csernoviczki (HUN) | 000 |
| | Éva Csernoviczki (HUN) | 001 |
| | Birgit Ente (NED) | 000 |
