= 2012 Judo World Masters =

Judo competition

Judo 2012 Judo World Masters
- Venue: Almaty
- Location: Almaty, Kazakhstan
- Dates: 14–15 January 2012
- Competitors: 218 from 44 nations

Competition at external databases
- Links: IJF • EJU • JudoInside

The 2012 Judo World Masters was held in Almaty, Kazakhstan, from 14 to 15 January 2012.

== Medal summary ==
=== Medal table ===
* Host nation (Kazakhstan)

Rank	Nation	Gold	Silver	Bronze	Total
1	Japan (JPN)	5	7	9	21
2	Brazil (BRA)	2	0	4	6
3	China (CHN)	1	2	1	4
4	Russia (RUS)	1	1	4	6
5	Mongolia (MGL)	1	1	0	2
6	Kazakhstan (KAZ)*	1	0	1	2
7	Azerbaijan (AZE)	1	0	0	1
7	France (FRA)	1	0	0	1
7	South Korea (KOR)	1	0	0	1
10	Netherlands (NED)	0	1	2	3
11	Portugal (POR)	0	1	0	1
11	Uzbekistan (UZB)	0	1	0	1
13	Algeria (ALG)	0	0	1	1
13	Belgium (BEL)	0	0	1	1
13	Egypt (EGY)	0	0	1	1
13	Germany (GER)	0	0	1	1
13	Great Britain (GBR)	0	0	1	1
13	Italy (ITA)	0	0	1	1
13	Slovenia (SLO)	0	0	1	1
Totals (19 entries)		14	14	28	56

=== Men's events ===
Event	Gold	Silver	Bronze
Extra-lightweight (-60 kg)	Arsen Galstyan; Russia	Rishod Sobirov; Uzbekistan	Beslan Mudranov; Russia
Extra-lightweight (-60 kg)	Arsen Galstyan; Russia	Rishod Sobirov; Uzbekistan	Hiroaki Hiraoka; Japan
Half-lightweight (-66 kg)	Sanjaasürengiin Miyaaragchaa; Mongolia	Khashbaataryn Tsagaanbaatar; Mongolia	Junpei Morishita; Japan
Half-lightweight (-66 kg)	Sanjaasürengiin Miyaaragchaa; Mongolia	Khashbaataryn Tsagaanbaatar; Mongolia	Masashi Ebinuma; Japan
Lightweight (-73 kg)	Wang Ki-chun; South Korea	Riki Nakaya; Japan	Hiroyuki Akimoto; Japan
Lightweight (-73 kg)	Wang Ki-chun; South Korea	Riki Nakaya; Japan	Mansur Isaev; Russia
Half-middleweight (-81 kg)	Elnur Mammadli; Azerbaijan	Takahiro Nakai; Japan	Euan Burton; Great Britain
Half-middleweight (-81 kg)	Elnur Mammadli; Azerbaijan	Takahiro Nakai; Japan	Sirazhudin Magomedov; Russia
Middleweight (-90 kg)	Masashi Nishiyama; Japan	Kirill Voprosov; Russia	Tiago Camilo; Brazil
Middleweight (-90 kg)	Masashi Nishiyama; Japan	Kirill Voprosov; Russia	Hugo Pessanha; Brazil
Half-heavyweight (-100 kg)	Maxim Rakov; Kazakhstan	Henk Grol; Netherlands	Takamasa Anai; Japan
Half-heavyweight (-100 kg)	Maxim Rakov; Kazakhstan	Henk Grol; Netherlands	Sergei Samoilovich; Russia
Heavyweight (+100 kg)	Rafael Silva; Brazil	Daiki Kamikawa; Japan	Andreas Tölzer; Germany
Heavyweight (+100 kg)	Rafael Silva; Brazil	Daiki Kamikawa; Japan	Islam El Shehaby; Egypt

=== Women's events ===
Event	Gold	Silver	Bronze
Extra-lightweight (-48 kg)	Tomoko Fukumi; Japan	Haruna Asami; Japan	Elena Moretti; Italy
Extra-lightweight (-48 kg)	Tomoko Fukumi; Japan	Haruna Asami; Japan	Sarah Menezes; Brazil
Half-lightweight (-52 kg)	Yuka Nishida; Japan	Misato Nakamura; Japan	Soraya Haddad; Algeria
Half-lightweight (-52 kg)	Yuka Nishida; Japan	Misato Nakamura; Japan	Ilse Heylen; Belgium
Lightweight (-57 kg)	Kaori Matsumoto; Japan	Telma Monteiro; Portugal	Rafaela Silva; Brazil
Lightweight (-57 kg)	Kaori Matsumoto; Japan	Telma Monteiro; Portugal	Aiko Sato; Japan
Half-middleweight (-63 kg)	Yoshie Ueno; Japan	Miki Tanaka; Japan	Xu Lili; China
Half-middleweight (-63 kg)	Yoshie Ueno; Japan	Miki Tanaka; Japan	Anicka van Emden; Netherlands
Middleweight (-70 kg)	Lucie Décosse; France	Yoriko Kunihara; Japan	Haruka Tachimoto; Japan
Middleweight (-70 kg)	Lucie Décosse; France	Yoriko Kunihara; Japan	Edith Bosch; Netherlands
Half-heavyweight (-78 kg)	Mayra Aguiar; Brazil	Yang Xiuli; China	Akari Ogata; Japan
Half-heavyweight (-78 kg)	Mayra Aguiar; Brazil	Yang Xiuli; China	Anamari Velenšek; Slovenia
Heavyweight (+78 kg)	Qin Qian; China	Tong Wen; China	Gulzhan Issanova; Kazakhstan
Heavyweight (+78 kg)	Qin Qian; China	Tong Wen; China	Mika Sugimoto; Japan
