= 2010 Judo Grand Prix Düsseldorf =

Judo competition

Judo 2010 Judo Grand Prix Düsseldorf
- Location: Düsseldorf, Germany
- Dates: 20–21 February 2010
- Competitors: 354 from 45 nations

Competition at external databases
- Links: IJF • JudoInside

The 2010 Judo Grand Prix Düsseldorf was held in Düsseldorf, Germany from 20 to 21 February 2010.

== Medal summary ==
=== Men's events ===
Event	Gold	Silver	Bronze
Extra-lightweight (−60 kg)	Georgii Zantaraia (UKR)	Hiroaki Hiraoka (JPN)	Davaadorjiin Tömörkhüleg (MGL)
Extra-lightweight (−60 kg)	Georgii Zantaraia (UKR)	Hiroaki Hiraoka (JPN)	Choi Gwang-hyeon (KOR)
Half-lightweight (−66 kg)	Khashbaataryn Tsagaanbaatar (MGL)	An Jeong-hwan (KOR)	Rok Drakšič (SLO)
Half-lightweight (−66 kg)	Khashbaataryn Tsagaanbaatar (MGL)	An Jeong-hwan (KOR)	Loïc Korval (FRA)
Lightweight (−73 kg)	Sainjargalyn Nyam-Ochir (MGL)	Ulan Gurtuev (RUS)	Navruz Jurakobilov (UZB)
Lightweight (−73 kg)	Sainjargalyn Nyam-Ochir (MGL)	Ulan Gurtuev (RUS)	João Pina (POR)
Half-middleweight (−81 kg)	Kim Jae-bum (KOR)	Euan Burton (GBR)	Robert Krawczyk (POL)
Half-middleweight (−81 kg)	Kim Jae-bum (KOR)	Euan Burton (GBR)	Song Dae-nam (KOR)
Middleweight (−90 kg)	Yuya Yoshida (JPN)	Khurshid Nabiev (UZB)	Timur Bolat (KAZ)
Middleweight (−90 kg)	Yuya Yoshida (JPN)	Khurshid Nabiev (UZB)	Dilshod Choriev (UZB)
Half-heavyweight (−100 kg)	Takamasa Anai (JPN)	Lukáš Krpálek (CZE)	Elco van der Geest (BEL)
Half-heavyweight (−100 kg)	Takamasa Anai (JPN)	Lukáš Krpálek (CZE)	Luciano Corrêa (BRA)
Heavyweight (+100 kg)	Islam El Shehaby (EGY)	Keiji Suzuki (JPN)	Zviadi Khanjaliashvili (GEO)
Heavyweight (+100 kg)	Islam El Shehaby (EGY)	Keiji Suzuki (JPN)	Robert Zimmermann (GER)

=== Women's events ===
Event	Gold	Silver	Bronze
Extra-lightweight (−48 kg)	Tomoko Fukumi (JPN)	Haruna Asami (JPN)	Paula Pareto (ARG)
Extra-lightweight (−48 kg)	Tomoko Fukumi (JPN)	Haruna Asami (JPN)	Alina Dumitru (ROU)
Half-lightweight (−52 kg)	Soraya Haddad (ALG)	Joana Ramos (POR)	Ilse Heylen (BEL)
Half-lightweight (−52 kg)	Soraya Haddad (ALG)	Joana Ramos (POR)	Mareen Kräh (GER)
Lightweight (−57 kg)	Kaori Matsumoto (JPN)	Telma Monteiro (POR)	Corina Căprioriu (ROU)
Lightweight (−57 kg)	Kaori Matsumoto (JPN)	Telma Monteiro (POR)	Hitomi Tokuhisa (JPN)
Half-middleweight (−63 kg)	Claudia Malzahn (GER)	Anicka van Emden (NED)	Marta Labazina (RUS)
Half-middleweight (−63 kg)	Claudia Malzahn (GER)	Anicka van Emden (NED)	Anne-Laure Bellard (FRA)
Middleweight (−70 kg)	Mina Watanabe (JPN)	Yoriko Kunihara (JPN)	Raša Sraka (SLO)
Middleweight (−70 kg)	Mina Watanabe (JPN)	Yoriko Kunihara (JPN)	Kelita Zupancic (CAN)
Half-heavyweight (−78 kg)	Heide Wollert (GER)	Ruika Sato (JPN)	Kayla Harrison (USA)
Half-heavyweight (−78 kg)	Heide Wollert (GER)	Ruika Sato (JPN)	Natalia Kazantseva (RUS)
Heavyweight (+78 kg)	Megumi Tachimoto (JPN)	Éva Bisséni (FRA)	Franziska Konitz (GER)
Heavyweight (+78 kg)	Megumi Tachimoto (JPN)	Éva Bisséni (FRA)	Lucija Polavder (SLO)

Source Results

=== Medal table ===
* Host nation (Germany)

Rank	Nation	Gold	Silver	Bronze	Total
1	Japan (JPN)	6	5	1	12
2	Germany (GER)*	2	0	3	5
3	Mongolia (MGL)	2	0	1	3
4	South Korea (KOR)	1	1	2	4
5	Algeria (ALG)	1	0	0	1
5	Egypt (EGY)	1	0	0	1
5	Ukraine (UKR)	1	0	0	1
8	Portugal (POR)	0	2	1	3
9	France (FRA)	0	1	2	3
9	Russia (RUS)	0	1	2	3
9	Uzbekistan (UZB)	0	1	2	3
12	Czech Republic (CZE)	0	1	0	1
12	Great Britain (GBR)	0	1	0	1
12	Netherlands (NED)	0	1	0	1
15	Slovenia (SLO)	0	0	3	3
16	Belgium (BEL)	0	0	2	2
16	Romania (ROU)	0	0	2	2
18	Argentina (ARG)	0	0	1	1
18	Brazil (BRA)	0	0	1	1
18	Canada (CAN)	0	0	1	1
18	Georgia (GEO)	0	0	1	1
18	Kazakhstan (KAZ)	0	0	1	1
18	Poland (POL)	0	0	1	1
18	United States (USA)	0	0	1	1
Totals (24 entries)		14	14	28	56
