= 2016 Judo Grand Slam Paris =

Judo competition

Judo 2016 Judo Grand Slam Paris
- Venue: AccorHotels Arena, Paris
- Location: Paris, France
- Dates: 6–7 February 2016
- Competitors: 557 from 91 nations

Competition at external databases
- Links: IJF • EJU • JudoInside

The 2016 Judo Grand Slam Paris was held in Paris, France, from 6 to 7 February 2016.

== Medal summary ==
=== Men's events ===
Event	Gold	Silver	Bronze
Extra-lightweight (−60 kg)	Toru Shishime (JPN)	Ilgar Mushkiyev (AZE)	Kim Won-jin (KOR)
Extra-lightweight (−60 kg)	Toru Shishime (JPN)	Ilgar Mushkiyev (AZE)	Walide Khyar (FRA)
Half-lightweight (−66 kg)	Masashi Ebinuma (JPN)	Davaadorjiin Tömörkhüleg (MGL)	An Ba-ul (KOR)
Half-lightweight (−66 kg)	Masashi Ebinuma (JPN)	Davaadorjiin Tömörkhüleg (MGL)	Kilian Le Blouch (FRA)
Lightweight (−73 kg)	An Chang-rim (KOR)	Denis Iartsev (RUS)	Hiroyuki Akimoto (JPN)
Lightweight (−73 kg)	An Chang-rim (KOR)	Denis Iartsev (RUS)	Sagi Muki (ISR)
Half-middleweight (−81 kg)	Avtandili Tchrikishvili (GEO)	Ivaylo Ivanov (BUL)	Wang Ki-chun (KOR)
Half-middleweight (−81 kg)	Avtandili Tchrikishvili (GEO)	Ivaylo Ivanov (BUL)	Victor Penalber (BRA)
Middleweight (−90 kg)	Daiki Nishiyama (JPN)	Alexandre Iddir (FRA)	Gwak Dong-han (KOR)
Middleweight (−90 kg)	Daiki Nishiyama (JPN)	Alexandre Iddir (FRA)	Varlam Liparteliani (GEO)
Half-heavyweight (−100 kg)	Cyrille Maret (FRA)	Kyle Reyes (CAN)	Aaron Wolf (JPN)
Half-heavyweight (−100 kg)	Cyrille Maret (FRA)	Kyle Reyes (CAN)	Karl-Richard Frey (GER)
Heavyweight (+100 kg)	Hisayoshi Harasawa (JPN)	Or Sasson (ISR)	David Moura (BRA)
Heavyweight (+100 kg)	Hisayoshi Harasawa (JPN)	Or Sasson (ISR)	Roy Meyer (NED)

=== Women's events ===
Event	Gold	Silver	Bronze
Extra-lightweight (−48 kg)	Otgontsetseg Galbadrakh (KAZ)	Mönkhbatyn Urantsetseg (MGL)	Éva Csernoviczki (HUN)
Extra-lightweight (−48 kg)	Otgontsetseg Galbadrakh (KAZ)	Mönkhbatyn Urantsetseg (MGL)	Sarah Menezes (BRA)
Half-lightweight (−52 kg)	Majlinda Kelmendi (KOS)	Andreea Chițu (ROU)	Annabelle Euranie (FRA)
Half-lightweight (−52 kg)	Majlinda Kelmendi (KOS)	Andreea Chițu (ROU)	Priscilla Gneto (FRA)
Lightweight (−57 kg)	Kim Jan-di (KOR)	Dorjsürengiin Sumiyaa (MGL)	Marti Malloy (USA)
Lightweight (−57 kg)	Kim Jan-di (KOR)	Dorjsürengiin Sumiyaa (MGL)	Rafaela Silva (BRA)
Half-middleweight (−63 kg)	Clarisse Agbegnenou (FRA)	Miku Tashiro (JPN)	Anicka van Emden (NED)
Half-middleweight (−63 kg)	Clarisse Agbegnenou (FRA)	Miku Tashiro (JPN)	Martyna Trajdos (GER)
Middleweight (−70 kg)	Kim Seong-yeon (KOR)	Haruka Tachimoto (JPN)	Sally Conway (GBR)
Middleweight (−70 kg)	Kim Seong-yeon (KOR)	Haruka Tachimoto (JPN)	Gévrise Émane (FRA)
Half-heavyweight (−78 kg)	Mayra Aguiar (BRA)	Kayla Harrison (USA)	Natalie Powell (GBR)
Half-heavyweight (−78 kg)	Mayra Aguiar (BRA)	Kayla Harrison (USA)	Luise Malzahn (GER)
Heavyweight (+78 kg)	Megumi Tachimoto (JPN)	Ma Sisi (CHN)	Tessie Savelkouls (NED)
Heavyweight (+78 kg)	Megumi Tachimoto (JPN)	Ma Sisi (CHN)	Marine Erb (FRA)

Source Results

=== Medal table ===
* Host nation (France)

Rank	Nation	Gold	Silver	Bronze	Total
1	Japan (JPN)	5	2	2	9
2	South Korea (KOR)	3	0	4	7
3	France (FRA)*	2	1	6	9
4	Brazil (BRA)	1	0	4	5
5	Georgia (GEO)	1	0	1	2
6	Kazakhstan (KAZ)	1	0	0	1
6	Kosovo (KOS)	1	0	0	1
8	Mongolia (MGL)	0	3	0	3
9	Israel (ISR)	0	1	1	2
9	United States (USA)	0	1	1	2
11	Azerbaijan (AZE)	0	1	0	1
11	Bulgaria (BUL)	0	1	0	1
11	Canada (CAN)	0	1	0	1
11	China (CHN)	0	1	0	1
11	Romania (ROU)	0	1	0	1
11	Russia (RUS)	0	1	0	1
17	Germany (GER)	0	0	3	3
17	Netherlands (NED)	0	0	3	3
19	Great Britain (GBR)	0	0	2	2
20	Hungary (HUN)	0	0	1	1
Totals (20 entries)		14	14	28	56
