= Claudia Malzahn =

German judoka (born 1983)

Personal information
- Born: 23 August 1983 (age 42)
- Occupation: Judoka

Sport
- Country: Germany
- Sport: Judo
- Weight class: ‍–‍63 kg

Achievements and titles
- Olympic Games: R32 (2012)
- World Champ.: (bronze) (2009)
- European Champ.: (silver) (2008)
Medal record
Women's judo
Representing Germany
World Championships
Bronze medal – third place	2009 Rotterdam	‍–‍63 kg
European Championships
Silver medal – second place	2008 Lisbon	‍–‍63 kg
Bronze medal – third place	2005 Rotterdam	‍–‍63 kg
World Masters
Bronze medal – third place	2011 Baku	‍–‍63 kg
IJF Grand Slam
Gold medal – first place	2009 Rio de Janeiro	‍–‍63 kg
Bronze medal – third place	2010 Rio de Janeiro	‍–‍63 kg
Bronze medal – third place	2010 Moscow	‍–‍63 kg
IJF Grand Prix
Gold medal – first place	2010 Düsseldorf	‍–‍63 kg
Gold medal – first place	2010 Tunis	‍–‍63 kg
Bronze medal – third place	2010 Rotterdam	‍–‍63 kg
Bronze medal – third place	2011 Abu Dhabi	‍–‍63 kg
Bronze medal – third place	2012 Düsseldorf	‍–‍63 kg
European Junior Championships
Gold medal – first place	2001 Budapest	‍–‍63 kg
Bronze medal – third place	2002 Rotterdam	‍–‍63 kg

Profile at external databases
- IJF: 604
- JudoInside.com: 263
- Updated on 3 September 2023

Claudia Malzahn (born 23 August 1983 in Halle/Saale) is a German judoka. At the 2012 Summer Olympics she competed in the Women's 63 kg, but was defeated in the first round.
