= Birgit Ente =

Dutch judoka (born 1988)

Personal information
- Born: 27 July 1988 (age 37) Alkmaar, Netherlands
- Occupation: Judoka

Sport
- Country: Netherlands
- Sport: Judo
- Weight class: ‍–‍48 kg, ‍–‍52 kg

Achievements and titles
- Olympic Games: R16 (2012)
- World Champ.: 7th (2009)
- European Champ.: 7th (2015)
Medal record
Women's judo
Representing the Netherlands
IJF Grand Prix
Silver medal – second place	2011 Amsterdam	‍–‍48 kg
Bronze medal – third place	2011 Baku	‍–‍48 kg
European U23 Championships
Silver medal – second place	2009 Antalya	‍–‍48 kg
Silver medal – second place	2010 Sarajevo	‍–‍48 kg

Profile at external databases
- IJF: 280
- JudoInside.com: 12134
- Updated on 1 January 2023

Birgit Ente (born 27 July 1988, in Alkmaar) is a Dutch judoka who competes in the women's 48 kg category. At the 2012 Summer Olympics, she was defeated in the second round.
