= Haruna Asami =

Japanese judoka (born 1988)

Personal information
- Born: 12 April 1988 (age 38) Iyo, Ehime, Japan
- Occupation: Judoka

Sport
- Country: Japan
- Sport: Judo
- Weight class: –48 kg

Achievements and titles
- World Champ.: (2010, 2011)
- Asian Champ.: (gold) (2015)
Medal record
Women's judo
Representing Japan
World Championships
Gold medal – first place	2010 Tokyo	‍–‍48 kg
Gold medal – first place	2011 Paris	‍–‍48 kg
Silver medal – second place	2013 Rio de Janeiro	‍–‍48 kg
Silver medal – second place	2015 Astana	‍–‍48 kg
Asian Championships
Gold medal – first place	2015 Kuwait City	‍–‍48 kg
World Masters
Gold medal – first place	2010 Suwon	‍–‍48 kg
Gold medal – first place	2011 Baku	‍–‍48 kg
Silver medal – second place	2012 Almaty	‍–‍48 kg
IJF Grand Slam
Gold medal – first place	2011 Paris	‍–‍48 kg
Gold medal – first place	2011 Rio de Janeiro	‍–‍48 kg
Gold medal – first place	2011 Tokyo	‍–‍48 kg
Gold medal – first place	2012 Tokyo	‍–‍48 kg
Gold medal – first place	2013 Paris	‍–‍48 kg
Silver medal – second place	2014 Tokyo	‍–‍48 kg
Silver medal – second place	2015 Tokyo	‍–‍48 kg
Bronze medal – third place	2008 Tokyo	‍–‍48 kg
IJF Grand Prix
Gold medal – first place	2009 Tunis	‍–‍48 kg
Silver medal – second place	2010 Düsseldorf	‍–‍48 kg
Bronze medal – third place	2015 Düsseldorf	‍–‍48 kg
East Asian Games
Gold medal – first place	2009 Hong Kong	‍–‍48 kg
Summer Universiade
Gold medal – first place	2009 Belgrade	‍–‍48 kg

Profile at external databases
- IJF: 2159
- JudoInside.com: 44566
- Updated on 3 July 2023

Haruna Asami (浅見 八瑠奈, Asami Haruna; born 12 April 1988) is a Japanese judoka. She started judo at the age of 3 under the instruction of her father, Mikio Asami who was former ‍–‍60 kg and ‍–‍65 kg national champion.

Asami won the gold medal in the extra-lightweight division (‍–‍48 kg) at the World Judo Championships in 2010 and 2011.

Asami's favorite techniques are Kosoto gari, Seoi nage and Tai otoshi.

== Results ==
2008
(bronze) All Japan Judo Championships -48 kg, Fukuoka
(bronze) Grand Slam -48 kg, Tokyo
2009
(gold) World Cup -48 kg, Sofia
(gold) World Cup -48 kg, Vienna
(gold) Grand Prix -48 kg, Tunis
(gold) Summer Universiade -48 kg, Belgrade
(gold) East Asian Games -48 kg, Hong Kong
(bronze) All Japan Judo Championships -48 kg, Fukuoka
2010
(gold) World Championships -48 kg, Tokyo
(gold) World Masters -48 kg, Suwon
(gold) World Cup -48 kg, Budapest
(gold) World Cup -48 kg, Ulan Bator
(silver) Grand Prix -48 kg, Düsseldorf
(silver) All Japan Judo Championships -48 kg, Fukuoka
2011
(gold) World Championships -48 kg, Paris
(gold) World Masters -48 kg, Baku
(gold) Grand Slam -48 kg, Paris
(gold) Grand Slam -48 kg, Rio de Janeiro
(gold) Grand Slam -48 kg, Tokyo
(silver) All Japan Judo Championships -48 kg, Fukuoka
2012
(gold) Grand Slam -48 kg, Tokyo
(silver) World Masters -48 kg, Almaty
2013
(gold) Grand Slam -48 kg, Paris
(gold) All Japan Judo Championships -48 kg, Fukuoka
(silver) World Championships -48 kg, Rio de Janeiro
