= Roni Schwartz =

Israeli judoka (born 1984)

Personal information
- Native name: רוני שוורץ
- Born: 26 January 1984 (age 42)
- Occupation: Judoka

Sport
- Country: Israel
- Sport: Judo
- Weight class: ‍–‍48 kg \ ‍–‍52 kg

Achievements and titles
- World Champ.: R16 (2010)
- European Champ.: 7th (2016)
Medal record
Women's judo
Representing Israel
IJF Grand Slam
Bronze medal – third place	2013 Moscow	‍–‍52 kg
Bronze medal – third place	2014 Baku	‍–‍52 kg
Bronze medal – third place	2015 Tyumen	‍–‍52 kg
IJF Grand Prix
Bronze medal – third place	2013 Almaty	‍–‍52 kg
Bronze medal – third place	2013 Tashkent	‍–‍52 kg
Bronze medal – third place	2015 Jeju	‍–‍52 kg

Profile at external databases
- IJF: 3185
- JudoInside.com: 39596
- Updated on 24 November 2022

Roni Schwartz (Hebrew: רוני שוורץ; born 26 January 1984) is an Israeli judoka.

She won the 6 bronze medals in the IJF World Tour, 3 of them in Grand Slam tournaments.

She is in a relationship with the Israeli-Belgian judoka Amélie Rosseneu.
