= Chung Jung-yeon =

South Korean Olympic judoka

Personal information
- Born: 4 July 1987 (age 38) Gyeongsangbuk-do, South Korea
- Occupation: Judoka

Sport
- Country: South Korea
- Sport: Judo
- Weight class: ‍–‍48 kg

Achievements and titles
- Olympic Games: R16 (2012)
- World Champ.: (bronze) (2009)
- Asian Champ.: (gold) (2009)
Medal record
Women's judo
Representing South Korea
World Championships
Bronze medal – third place	2009 Rotterdam	‍–‍48 kg
Asian Games
Bronze medal – third place	2010 Guangzhou	‍–‍48 kg
Asian Championships
Gold medal – first place	2009 Taipei	‍–‍48 kg
Bronze medal – third place	2008 Jeju	‍–‍48 kg
Bronze medal – third place	2012 Tashkent	‍–‍48 kg
IJF Grand Slam
Silver medal – second place	2009 Moscow	‍–‍48 kg
Silver medal – second place	2010 Moscow	‍–‍48 kg
Bronze medal – third place	2010 Paris	‍–‍48 kg
IJF Grand Prix
Silver medal – second place	2012 Qingdao	‍–‍48 kg
Bronze medal – third place	2011 Abu Dhabi	‍–‍48 kg
Asian Junior Championships
Gold medal – first place	2005 Beirut	‍–‍45 kg
Bronze medal – third place	2004 Doha	‍–‍45 kg
Summer Universiade
Bronze medal – third place	2009 Belgrade	‍–‍48 kg

Profile at external databases
- IJF: 60
- JudoInside.com: 34353
- Updated on 28 August 2023

Chung Jung-yeon (or Jeong Jeong-yeon, Korean: 천정연, born 4 July 1987 in Gyeongsangbuk) is a South Korean judoka who competes in the women's 48 kg category. At the 2012 Summer Olympics, she was defeated in the second round.
