= Éva Csernoviczki =

Hungarian judoka (born 1986)

Personal information
- Nationality: Hungarian
- Born: 16 October 1986 (age 39) Tatabánya, Hungary
- Occupation: Judoka

Sport
- Country: Hungary
- Sport: Judo
- Weight class: –48 kg

Achievements and titles
- Olympic Games: (bronze) (2012)
- World Champ.: (bronze) (2011)
- European Champ.: (gold) (2013, 2014)
Medal record
Women's judo
Representing Hungary
Olympic Games
Bronze medal – third place	2012 London	‍–‍48 kg
World Championships
Bronze medal – third place	2011 Paris	‍–‍48 kg
European Games
Bronze medal – third place	2015 Baku	‍–‍48 kg
European Championships
Gold medal – first place	2013 Budapest	‍–‍48 kg
Gold medal – first place	2014 Montpellier	‍–‍48 kg
Silver medal – second place	2009 Tbilisi	‍–‍48 kg
Silver medal – second place	2010 Vienna	‍–‍48 kg
Silver medal – second place	2011 Istanbul	‍–‍48 kg
Silver medal – second place	2016 Kazan	‍–‍48 kg
Silver medal – second place	2018 Tel Aviv	‍–‍48 kg
Bronze medal – third place	2008 Lisbon	‍–‍48 kg
Bronze medal – third place	2012 Chelyabinsk	‍–‍48 kg
Bronze medal – third place	2017 Warsaw	‍–‍48 kg
World Masters
Bronze medal – third place	2011 Baku	‍–‍48 kg
IJF Grand Slam
Silver medal – second place	2011 Paris	‍–‍48 kg
Silver medal – second place	2014 Abu Dhabi	‍–‍48 kg
Silver medal – second place	2015 Baku	‍–‍48 kg
Silver medal – second place	2016 Baku	‍–‍48 kg
Silver medal – second place	2018 Düsseldorf	‍–‍48 kg
Bronze medal – third place	2009 Moscow	‍–‍48 kg
Bronze medal – third place	2011 Rio de Janeiro	‍–‍48 kg
Bronze medal – third place	2016 Paris	‍–‍48 kg
IJF Grand Prix
Gold medal – first place	2009 Abu Dhabi	‍–‍48 kg
Gold medal – first place	2013 Miami	‍–‍48 kg
Gold medal – first place	2014 Budapest	‍–‍48 kg
Silver medal – second place	2015 Jeju	‍–‍48 kg
Silver medal – second place	2018 Tashkent	‍–‍48 kg
Bronze medal – third place	2017 Cancún	‍–‍48 kg
Bronze medal – third place	2017 Tashkent	‍–‍48 kg
Bronze medal – third place	2019 Tel Aviv	‍–‍48 kg
European U23 Championships
Gold medal – first place	2003 Yerevan	‍–‍48 kg
Gold medal – first place	2006 Moscow	‍–‍48 kg
Gold medal – first place	2008 Zagreb	‍–‍48 kg
Silver medal – second place	2007 Salzburg	‍–‍48 kg
European Junior Championships
Silver medal – second place	2005 Zagreb	‍–‍48 kg
European Cadet Championships
Bronze medal – third place	2002 Győr	‍–‍48 kg
Summer Universiade
Bronze medal – third place	2009 Belgrade	‍–‍48 kg

Profile at external databases
- IJF: 241
- JudoInside.com: 24302
- Updated on 21 May 2023

Éva Csernoviczki (born 16 October 1986 in Tatabánya) is a Hungarian judoka. She became the first Hungarian woman to win an Olympic medal in judo, after getting the bronze in the Woman's Judo 48 kg in the 2012 Summer Olympics. She also competed in the women's 48 kg event at the 2016 Summer Olympics, where she was eliminated by Galbadrakh Otgontsetseg in the repechage.

Csernoviczki also earned a bronze medal at the 2011 World Judo Championships, and has silver medals from three consecutive European Judo Championships.

In 2021, she represented Hungary at the 2020 Summer Olympics in Tokyo, Japan. She competed in the women's 48 kg event.

Her father, Csaba Csernoviczki, coaches the female Hungarian judo team.
