= Elena Moretti =

Italian judoka (born 1987)

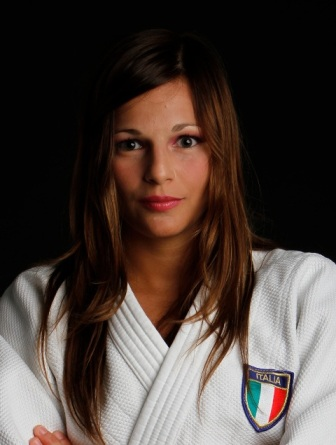

Personal information
- Born: 29 June 1987 (age 39) Brescia, Italy
- Occupation: Judoka

Sport
- Country: Italy
- Sport: Judo
- Weight class: ‍–‍48 kg, ‍–‍52 kg

Achievements and titles
- Olympic Games: R16 (2012)
- World Champ.: R16 (2010)
- European Champ.: R16 (2009, 2011, 2012, 2013)
Medal record
Women's judo
Representing Italy
World Masters
Bronze medal – third place	2012 Almaty	‍–‍48 kg
IJF Grand Slam
Bronze medal – third place	2011 Moscow	‍–‍48 kg
IJF Grand Prix
Bronze medal – third place	2011 Baku	‍–‍48 kg
European U23 Championships
Gold medal – first place	2009 Antalya	‍–‍48 kg
Mediterranean Games
Gold medal – first place	2009 Pescara	‍–‍48 kg

Profile at external databases
- IJF: 690
- JudoInside.com: 30096
- Updated on 20 November 2022

Elena Moretti (born 29 June 1987 in Brescia) is an Italian judoka who competes in the women's 48 kg (106 lb) category. At the 2012 Summer Olympics, she was defeated in the second round.
