= Amélie Rosseneu =

Israeli-Belgian former judoka and coach

Personal information
- Native name: אמלי רוסנו
- Born: 18 January 1988 (age 38)
- Occupation: Judoka
- Website: www.amelierosseneu.com

Sport
- Country: Belgium (2009–13); Israel (2014–16)
- Sport: Judo
- Weight class: ‍–‍48 kg
- Rank: 5th dan black belt

Achievements and titles
- World Champ.: R16 (2013)
- European Champ.: 5th (2013, 2014)
Medal record
Women's judo
Representing Belgium
IJF Grand Slam
Bronze medal – third place	2010 Moscow	‍–‍48 kg
Bronze medal – third place	2012 Tokyo	‍–‍48 kg
IJF Grand Prix
Gold medal – first place	2012 Qingdao	‍–‍48 kg
Silver medal – second place	2012 Abu Dhabi	‍–‍48 kg
Bronze medal – third place	2010 Tunis	‍–‍48 kg
European U23 Championships
Gold medal – first place	2010 Sarajevo	‍–‍48 kg
Bronze medal – third place	2009 Antalya	‍–‍48 kg
Representing Israel
IJF Grand Slam
Silver medal – second place	2014 Baku	‍–‍48 kg
IJF Grand Prix
Bronze medal – third place	2014 Tbilisi	‍–‍48 kg

Profile at external databases
- IJF: 15858, 328
- JudoInside.com: 29395
- Updated on 21 August 2023

Amélie Rosseneu (Hebrew: אמלי רוסנו; born 18 January 1988) is a Belgian–Israeli former judoka and coach.

== Judo career ==
She won the gold medal at the 2012 Judo Grand Prix Qingdao competing for Belgium.

== Personal life ==
She is in a relationship with the Israeli judoka Roni Schwartz.
