= Tomoko Fukumi =

Japanese judoka (born 1985)

Personal information
- Born: 26 June 1985 (age 40) Tsuchiura, Ibaraki, Japan
- Education: Tsukuba University
- Occupation: Judoka

Sport
- Country: Japan
- Sport: Judo
- Weight class: ‍–‍48 kg
- Rank: 4th dan black belt

Achievements and titles
- Olympic Games: 5th (2012)
- World Champ.: (2009)
- Asian Champ.: (gold) (2005)
Medal record
Women's judo
Representing Japan
World Championships
Gold medal – first place	2009 Rotterdam	‍–‍48 kg
Silver medal – second place	2010 Tokyo	‍–‍48 kg
Silver medal – second place	2011 Paris	‍–‍48 kg
Asian Games
Silver medal – second place	2010 Guangzhou	‍–‍48 kg
Asian Championships
Gold medal – first place	2005 Tashkent	‍–‍48 kg
World Masters
Gold medal – first place	2012 Almaty	‍–‍48 kg
Bronze medal – third place	2010 Suwon	‍–‍48 kg
IJF Grand Slam
Gold medal – first place	2008 Tokyo	‍–‍48 kg
Gold medal – first place	2009 Moscow	‍–‍48 kg
Gold medal – first place	2009 Tokyo	‍–‍48 kg
Gold medal – first place	2010 Rio de Janeiro	‍–‍48 kg
Gold medal – first place	2010 Tokyo	‍–‍48 kg
Gold medal – first place	2011 Moscow	‍–‍48 kg
Gold medal – first place	2012 Paris	‍–‍48 kg
Silver medal – second place	2011 Tokyo	‍–‍48 kg
Bronze medal – third place	2009 Paris	‍–‍48 kg
Bronze medal – third place	2010 Paris	‍–‍48 kg
IJF Grand Prix
Gold medal – first place	2009 Hamburg	‍–‍48 kg
Gold medal – first place	2010 Düsseldorf	‍–‍48 kg
Gold medal – first place	2011 Düsseldorf	‍–‍48 kg
World Juniors Championships
Gold medal – first place	2004 Budapest	‍–‍48 kg
Asian Junior Championships
Gold medal – first place	2001 Ho Chi Minh City	‍–‍48 kg
Summer Universiade
Gold medal – first place	2007 Bangkok	‍–‍48 kg
East Asian Championships
Gold medal – first place	2006 Ulaanbaatar	‍–‍48 kg

Profile at external databases
- IJF: 28
- JudoInside.com: 18533
- Updated on 17 July 2023

Tomoko Fukumi (福見 友子, Fukumi Tomoko; born 26 June 1985 in Tsuchiura, Ibaraki) is a Japanese judoka from Tsukuba University. She competed for Japan at the 2012 Summer Olympics.

Fukumi is a 4th dan in judo. She is the only judoka to have beaten Ryoko Tani twice. Later she won the gold medal in the extra-lightweight (‍–‍48 kg) division at the 2009 World Judo Championships. She is known for her seoinage, kouchigari, and newaza. In 2014, Fukumi took a year off to study abroad at Loughborough University.
