= Alexandra Podryadova =

Kazakhstani judoka (born 1989)

Personal information
- Born: 11 May 1989 (age 37) Shymkent
- Occupation: Judoka

Sport
- Country: Kazakhstan
- Sport: Judo
- Weight class: ‍–‍48 kg

Achievements and titles
- Olympic Games: R16 (2012)
- World Champ.: R16 (2015)
- Asian Champ.: 5th (2010, 2011, 2012, 2015, 2016)
Medal record
Women's judo
Representing Kazakhstan
IJF Grand Prix
Silver medal – second place	2013 Almaty	‍–‍48 kg
Silver medal – second place	2013 Tashkent	‍–‍48 kg
Bronze medal – third place	2015 Ulaanbaatar	‍–‍48 kg
World Juniors Championships
Bronze medal – third place	2006 Santo Domingo	‍–‍48 kg
Asian Junior Championships
Silver medal – second place	2008 Sana'a	‍–‍48 kg

Profile at external databases
- IJF: 2332
- JudoInside.com: 43425
- Updated on 16 December 2022

Alexandra Podryadova (Александра Викторовна Подрядова (Емельянова) born 11 May 1989) is a Kazakhstani judoka from Shymkent who competes in the women's 48 kg category. At the 2012 Summer Olympics, she was defeated in the second round.
