= Oiana Blanco =

Spanish judoka

Personal information
- Born: 13 May 1983 (age 43)
- Occupation: Judoka

Sport
- Country: Spain
- Sport: Judo
- Weight class: ‍–‍48 kg

Achievements and titles
- Olympic Games: R32 (2012)
- World Champ.: (silver) (2009)
- European Champ.: (bronze) (2010)
Medal record
Women's judo
Representing Spain
World Championships
Silver medal – second place	2009 Rotterdam	‍–‍48 kg
European Championships
Bronze medal – third place	2010 Vienna	‍–‍48 kg
IJF Grand Prix
Silver medal – second place	2011 Qingdao	‍–‍48 kg

Profile at external databases
- IJF: 403
- JudoInside.com: 17261
- Updated on 28 August 2023

Oiana Blanco is a Spanish judoka who competes in the women's 48 kg category. At the 2012 Summer Olympics, she was defeated in the first round.
