= Dayaris Mestre Álvarez =

Cuban judoka (born 1986)

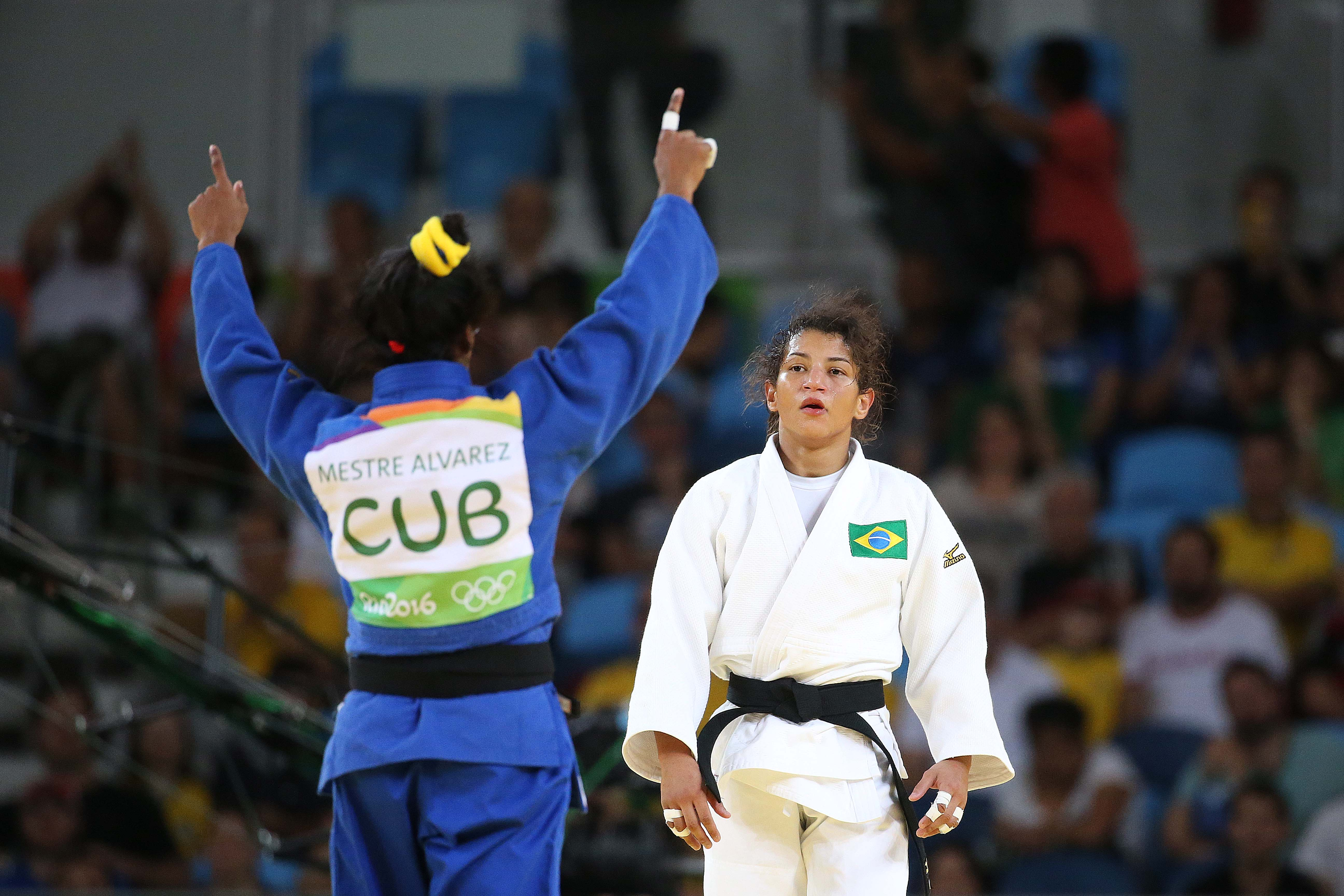

Personal information
- Full name: Dayaris Rosa Mestre Álvarez
- Born: 20 November 1986 (age 39)
- Occupation: Judoka

Sport
- Country: Cuba
- Sport: Judo
- Weight class: ‍–‍48 kg

Achievements and titles
- Olympic Games: 5th (2016)
- World Champ.: 5th (2014)
- Pan American Champ.: (2012, 2014)
Medal record
Women's judo
Representing Cuba
Pan American Games
Gold medal – first place	2015 Toronto	‍–‍48 kg
Silver medal – second place	2011 Guadalajara	‍–‍48 kg
Pan American Championships
Gold medal – first place	2012 Montreal	‍–‍48 kg
Gold medal – first place	2014 Guayaquil	‍–‍44 kg
Silver medal – second place	2010 San Salvador	‍–‍48 kg
Silver medal – second place	2011 Guadalajara	‍–‍48 kg
Silver medal – second place	2013 San José	‍–‍48 kg
Bronze medal – third place	2006 Buenos Aires	‍–‍44 kg
Bronze medal – third place	2015 Edmonton	‍–‍48 kg
Bronze medal – third place	2016 Havana	‍–‍48 kg
World Masters
Bronze medal – third place	2013 Tyumen	‍–‍48 kg
IJF Grand Slam
Silver medal – second place	2012 Tokyo	‍–‍48 kg
Bronze medal – third place	2011 Paris	‍–‍48 kg
IJF Grand Prix
Silver medal – second place	2014 Havana	‍–‍48 kg
Bronze medal – third place	2012 Düsseldorf	‍–‍48 kg
Bronze medal – third place	2016 Havana	‍–‍48 kg
Bronze medal – third place	2016 Düsseldorf	‍–‍48 kg
Summer Universiade
Bronze medal – third place	2013 Kazan	‍–‍48 kg

Profile at external databases
- IJF: 2381
- JudoInside.com: 38830
- Updated on 20 November 2022

Dayaris Rosa Mestre Álvarez (Sancti Spíritus, 20 November 1986) is a Cuban judoka who competes in the women's 48 kg category. At the 2012 Summer Olympics, she was defeated in the second round. She lost the bronze medal match to Otgontsetseg Galbadrakh in the women's 48 kg event at the 2016 Summer Olympics.
