= Mönkhbatyn Urantsetseg =

Mongolian judoka (born 1990)

Urantsetseg Munkhbat
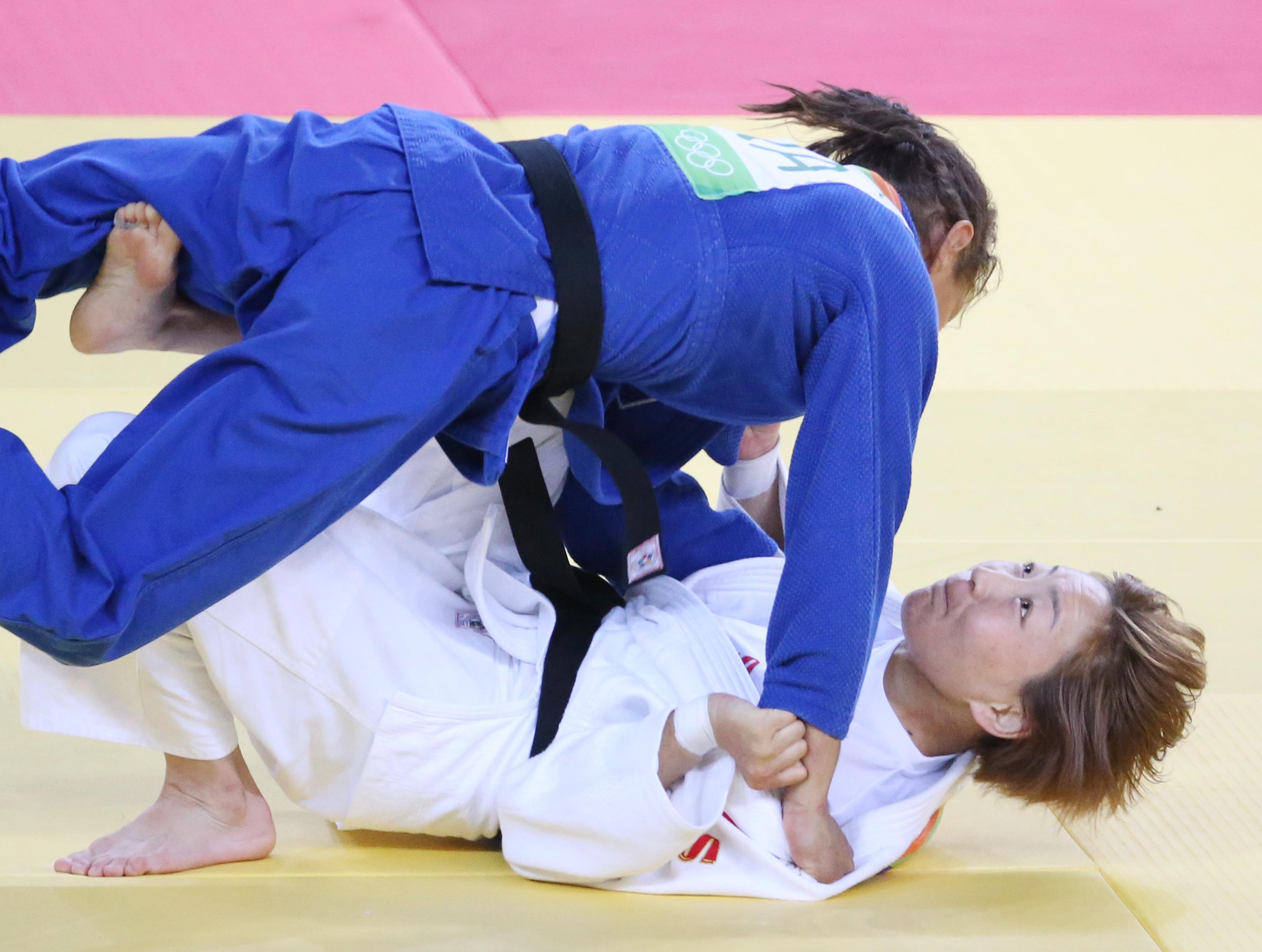
- Mönkhbatyn Urantsetseg (bottom) at the 2016 Olympics

Personal information
- Native name: Мөнхбатын Уранцэцэг
- Nationality: Mongolia
- Born: 14 March 1990 (age 36) Bayan-Ovoo, Bayankhongor, Mongolia
- Occupation: Judoka
- Height: 1.64 m (5 ft 5 in)

Sport
- Country: Mongolia
- Sport: Judo
- Weight class: –48 kg
- Coached by: Baljinnyam Odvog (national)
- Retired: 15 January 2022

Achievements and titles
- Olympic Games: (bronze) (2020)
- World Champ.: (gold) (2013)
- Asian Champ.: (gold) (2012, 2014, 2017)
Medal record
Women's judo
Representing Mongolia
Olympic Games
| Bronze medal – third place | 2020 Tokyo | ‍–‍48 kg |
World Championships
| Gold medal – first place | 2013 Rio de Janeiro | ‍–‍48 kg |
| Silver medal – second place | 2014 Chelyabinsk | Women's team |
| Silver medal – second place | 2017 Budapest | ‍–‍48 kg |
| Bronze medal – third place | 2019 Tokyo | ‍–‍48 kg |
| Bronze medal – third place | 2021 Budapest | ‍–‍48 kg |
Asian Games
| Gold medal – first place | 2014 Incheon | ‍–‍48 kg |
| Bronze medal – third place | 2018 Jakarta | ‍–‍48 kg |
Asian Championships
| Gold medal – first place | 2012 Tashkent | ‍–‍48 kg |
| Gold medal – first place | 2017 Hong Kong | ‍–‍48 kg |
| Silver medal – second place | 2015 Kuwait City | ‍–‍48 kg |
| Silver medal – second place | 2016 Tashkent | ‍–‍48 kg |
| Bronze medal – third place | 2009 Taipei | ‍–‍48 kg |
| Bronze medal – third place | 2013 Bangkok | ‍–‍48 kg |
World Masters
| Gold medal – first place | 2015 Rabat | ‍–‍48 kg |
| Bronze medal – third place | 2017 Saint Petersburg | ‍–‍48 kg |
| Bronze medal – third place | 2021 Doha | ‍–‍48 kg |
IJF Grand Slam
| Gold medal – first place | 2014 Baku | ‍–‍48 kg |
| Gold medal – first place | 2014 Abu Dhabi | ‍–‍48 kg |
| Gold medal – first place | 2015 Paris | ‍–‍48 kg |
| Gold medal – first place | 2016 Tokyo | ‍–‍48 kg |
| Gold medal – first place | 2018 Abu Dhabi | ‍–‍48 kg |
| Gold medal – first place | 2021 Tashkent | ‍–‍48 kg |
| Gold medal – first place | 2021 Tbilisi | ‍–‍48 kg |
| Silver medal – second place | 2013 Tokyo | ‍–‍48 kg |
| Silver medal – second place | 2014 Paris | ‍–‍48 kg |
| Silver medal – second place | 2016 Paris | ‍–‍48 kg |
| Silver medal – second place | 2017 Paris | ‍–‍48 kg |
| Silver medal – second place | 2017 Tokyo | ‍–‍48 kg |
| Silver medal – second place | 2018 Osaka | ‍–‍48 kg |
| Bronze medal – third place | 2012 Paris | ‍–‍48 kg |
| Bronze medal – third place | 2013 Paris | ‍–‍48 kg |
| Bronze medal – third place | 2016 Abu Dhabi | ‍–‍48 kg |
| Bronze medal – third place | 2018 Paris | ‍–‍48 kg |
| Bronze medal – third place | 2020 Paris | ‍–‍48 kg |
IJF Grand Prix
| Gold medal – first place | 2013 Ulaanbaatar | ‍–‍48 kg |
| Gold medal – first place | 2014 Ulaanbaatar | ‍–‍48 kg |
| Gold medal – first place | 2015 Tashkent | ‍–‍48 kg |
| Gold medal – first place | 2016 Ulaanbaatar | ‍–‍48 kg |
| Gold medal – first place | 2017 Tashkent | ‍–‍48 kg |
| Silver medal – second place | 2011 Baku | ‍–‍48 kg |
| Silver medal – second place | 2014 Düsseldorf | ‍–‍48 kg |
| Silver medal – second place | 2015 Düsseldorf | ‍–‍48 kg |
| Silver medal – second place | 2015 Qingdao | ‍–‍48 kg |
| Silver medal – second place | 2019 Antalya | ‍–‍52 kg |
| Bronze medal – third place | 2010 Qingdao | ‍–‍48 kg |
| Bronze medal – third place | 2012 Qingdao | ‍–‍52 kg |
| Bronze medal – third place | 2013 Abu Dhabi | ‍–‍48 kg |
| Bronze medal – third place | 2016 Düsseldorf | ‍–‍48 kg |
| Bronze medal – third place | 2017 Hohhot | ‍–‍52 kg |
| Bronze medal – third place | 2017 The Hague | ‍–‍52 kg |
| Bronze medal – third place | 2018 Hohhot | ‍–‍48 kg |
| Bronze medal – third place | 2019 Tbilisi | ‍–‍48 kg |
Summer Universiade
| Silver medal – second place | 2009 Belgrade | ‍–‍48 kg |
| Bronze medal – third place | 2015 Gwangju | ‍–‍48 kg |
World Combat Games
| Bronze medal – third place | 2013 Russia | Women's team |
Women's sambo
World Championships
| Gold medal – first place | 2010 Tashkent | ‍–‍48 kg |

Profile at external databases
- IJF: 209
- JudoInside.com: 53718
- Updated on 23 May 2023

Mönkhbatyn Urantsetseg (Mongolian: Мөнхбатын Уранцэцэг, born 14 March 1990) is a Mongolian sambist and retired judoka who competed in the 48 kg category, and World Champion in both sports. In 2021, she won one of the bronze medals in the women's 48 kg event at the 2020 Summer Olympics in Tokyo, Japan.

== Career ==
In 2013, she became the first female world champion in judo from Mongolia. At the 2012 Summer Olympics, she was defeated in the quarterfinals. At the 2016 Summer Olympics, she lost to Ami Kondo in the bronze medal match. In 2017, she is gold medalist in the Asian Judo Championship and silver medalist in the World Judo Championship. In 2019, she is bronze medalist in the World Judo Championship in Tokyo.

In 2021, she won one of the bronze medals in her event at the 2021 Judo World Masters held in Doha, Qatar and the Summer Olympics held in Tokyo, Japan. She is also two-time World Champion in sambo, in 2010 and 2014.
