= Judo at the 2010 Asian Games =

- Venue: Huagong Gymnasium
- Dates: 13–16 November 2010
- Competitors: 231 from 32 nations

Judo at the 2010 Asian Games was held in Guangzhou, China between 13 and 16 November 2010. All competition held in the Huagong Gymnasium.

== Schedule ==
P	Preliminary rounds	F	Repechage, Semifinals & Finals

Event↓/Date →	13th Sat		14th Sun		15th Mon		16th Tue	
Men's 60 kg							P	F
Men's 66 kg					P	F		
Men's 73 kg					P	F		
Men's 81 kg			P	F				
Men's 90 kg			P	F				
Men's 100 kg	P	F						
Men's +100 kg	P	F						
Men's openweight							P	F
Women's 48 kg							P	F
Women's 52 kg					P	F		
Women's 57 kg					P	F		
Women's 63 kg			P	F				
Women's 70 kg			P	F				
Women's 78 kg	P	F						
Women's +78 kg	P	F						
Women's openweight							P	F

== Medalists ==
=== Men ===
Event	Gold	Silver	Bronze
Extra lightweight (−60 kg)	Rishod Sobirov; Uzbekistan	Hiroaki Hiraoka; Japan	A Lamusi; China
Extra lightweight (−60 kg)	Rishod Sobirov; Uzbekistan	Hiroaki Hiraoka; Japan	Choi Min-ho; South Korea
Half lightweight (−66 kg)	Kim Joo-jin; South Korea	Mirzohid Farmonov; Uzbekistan	Junpei Morishita; Japan
Half lightweight (−66 kg)	Kim Joo-jin; South Korea	Mirzohid Farmonov; Uzbekistan	Hong Kuk-hyon; North Korea
Lightweight (−73 kg)	Hiroyuki Akimoto; Japan	Wang Ki-chun; South Korea	Navruz Jurakobilov; Uzbekistan
Lightweight (−73 kg)	Hiroyuki Akimoto; Japan	Wang Ki-chun; South Korea	Rasul Boqiev; Tajikistan
Half middleweight (−81 kg)	Kim Jae-bum; South Korea	Islam Bozbayev; Kazakhstan	None awarded
Half middleweight (−81 kg)	Kim Jae-bum; South Korea	Masahiro Takamatsu; Japan	None awarded
Middleweight (−90 kg)	Takashi Ono; Japan	Dilshod Choriev; Uzbekistan	Tseng Han-chieh; Chinese Taipei
Middleweight (−90 kg)	Takashi Ono; Japan	Dilshod Choriev; Uzbekistan	Lee Kyu-won; South Korea
Half heavyweight (−100 kg)	Hwang Hee-tae; South Korea	Takamasa Anai; Japan	Maxim Rakov; Kazakhstan
Half heavyweight (−100 kg)	Hwang Hee-tae; South Korea	Takamasa Anai; Japan	Ramziddin Sayidov; Uzbekistan
Heavyweight (+100 kg)	Kim Soo-whan; South Korea	Abdullo Tangriev; Uzbekistan	Daiki Kamikawa; Japan
Heavyweight (+100 kg)	Kim Soo-whan; South Korea	Abdullo Tangriev; Uzbekistan	Mohammad Reza Roudaki; Iran
Openweight	Kazuhiko Takahashi; Japan	Mohammad Reza Roudaki; Iran	Khadbaataryn Mönkhbaatar; Mongolia
Openweight	Kazuhiko Takahashi; Japan	Mohammad Reza Roudaki; Iran	Utkir Kurbanov; Uzbekistan

=== Women ===
Event	Gold	Silver	Bronze
Extra lightweight (−48 kg)	Wu Shugen; China	Tomoko Fukumi; Japan	Chung Jung-yeon; South Korea
Extra lightweight (−48 kg)	Wu Shugen; China	Tomoko Fukumi; Japan	Baljinnyamyn Bat-Erdene; Mongolia
Half lightweight (−52 kg)	Misato Nakamura; Japan	Mönkhbaataryn Bundmaa; Mongolia	He Hongmei; China
Half lightweight (−52 kg)	Misato Nakamura; Japan	Mönkhbaataryn Bundmaa; Mongolia	An Kum-ae; North Korea
Lightweight (−57 kg)	Kaori Matsumoto; Japan	Kim Jan-di; South Korea	Tümen-Odyn Battögs; Mongolia
Lightweight (−57 kg)	Kaori Matsumoto; Japan	Kim Jan-di; South Korea	Lien Chen-ling; Chinese Taipei
Half middleweight (−63 kg)	Yoshie Ueno; Japan	Wang Chin-fang; Chinese Taipei	Kong Ja-young; South Korea
Half middleweight (−63 kg)	Yoshie Ueno; Japan	Wang Chin-fang; Chinese Taipei	Kim Su-gyong; North Korea
Middleweight (−70 kg)	Hwang Ye-sul; South Korea	Sol Kyong; North Korea	Tsend-Ayuushiin Naranjargal; Mongolia
Middleweight (−70 kg)	Hwang Ye-sul; South Korea	Sol Kyong; North Korea	Chen Fei; China
Half heavyweight (−78 kg)	Jeong Gyeong-mi; South Korea	Akari Ogata; Japan	Yang Xiuli; China
Half heavyweight (−78 kg)	Jeong Gyeong-mi; South Korea	Akari Ogata; Japan	Galiya Ulmentayeva; Kazakhstan
Heavyweight (+78 kg)	Mika Sugimoto; Japan	Qin Qian; China	Kim Na-young; South Korea
Heavyweight (+78 kg)	Mika Sugimoto; Japan	Qin Qian; China	Gulzhan Issanova; Kazakhstan
Openweight	Liu Huanyuan; China	Kim Na-young; South Korea	Megumi Tachimoto; Japan
Openweight	Liu Huanyuan; China	Kim Na-young; South Korea	Dorjgotovyn Tserenkhand; Mongolia

== Medal table ==
Rank	Nation	Gold	Silver	Bronze	Total
1	Japan (JPN)	7	5	3	15
2	South Korea (KOR)	6	3	5	14
3	China (CHN)	2	1	4	7
4	Uzbekistan (UZB)	1	3	3	7
5	Mongolia (MGL)	0	1	5	6
6	Kazakhstan (KAZ)	0	1	3	4
6	North Korea (PRK)	0	1	3	4
8	Chinese Taipei (TPE)	0	1	2	3
9	Iran (IRI)	0	1	1	2
10	Tajikistan (TJK)	0	0	1	1
Totals (10 entries)		16	17	30	63

== Participating nations ==
A total of 231 athletes from 32 nations competed in judo at the 2010 Asian Games:

- Afghanistan (2)
- Athletes from Kuwait (10)
- Bahrain (1)
- China (15)
- Chinese Taipei (4)
- Hong Kong (2)
- India (8)
- Iran (10)
- Iraq (2)
- Japan (16)
- Kazakhstan (16)
- Kyrgyzstan (9)
- Laos (5)
- Lebanon (6)
- Macau (4)
- Mongolia (15)
- Nepal (4)
- North Korea (8)
- Pakistan (6)
- Palestine (1)
- Philippines (6)
- Qatar (4)
- Saudi Arabia (5)
- South Korea (14)
- Syria (3)
- Tajikistan (7)
- Thailand (10)
- Turkmenistan (12)
- United Arab Emirates (3)
- Uzbekistan (10)
- Vietnam (10)
- Yemen (3)
