= Judo at the 2014 Asian Games =

Judo competition

- Venue: Dowon Gymnasium
- Dates: 20–23 September 2014
- Competitors: 218 from 33 nations

Judo at the 2014 Asian Games was held at the Dowon Gymnasium in Incheon, South Korea between 20 and 23 September 2014.

== Schedule ==
P	Preliminary rounds & Repechage	F	Finals

Event↓/Date →	20th Sat		21st Sun		22nd Mon		23rd Tue	
Men's 60 kg	P	F						
Men's 66 kg	P	F						
Men's 73 kg			P	F				
Men's 81 kg			P	F				
Men's 90 kg					P	F		
Men's 100 kg					P	F		
Men's +100 kg					P	F		
Men's team							P	F
Women's 48 kg	P	F						
Women's 52 kg	P	F						
Women's 57 kg			P	F				
Women's 63 kg			P	F				
Women's 70 kg			P	F				
Women's 78 kg					P	F		
Women's +78 kg					P	F		
Women's team							P	F

== Medalists ==
=== Men ===
Event	Gold	Silver	Bronze
Extra lightweight (−60 kg)	Yeldos Smetov; Kazakhstan	Ganbatyn Boldbaatar; Mongolia	Toru Shishime; Japan
Extra lightweight (−60 kg)	Yeldos Smetov; Kazakhstan	Ganbatyn Boldbaatar; Mongolia	Kim Won-jin; South Korea
Half lightweight (−66 kg)	Davaadorjiin Tömörkhüleg; Mongolia	Tomofumi Takajo; Japan	Mirzohid Farmonov; Uzbekistan
Half lightweight (−66 kg)	Davaadorjiin Tömörkhüleg; Mongolia	Tomofumi Takajo; Japan	Azamat Mukanov; Kazakhstan
Lightweight (−73 kg)	Hiroyuki Akimoto; Japan	Ganbaataryn Odbayar; Mongolia	Hong Kuk-hyon; North Korea
Lightweight (−73 kg)	Hiroyuki Akimoto; Japan	Ganbaataryn Odbayar; Mongolia	Bang Gui-man; South Korea
Half middleweight (−81 kg)	Kim Jae-bum; South Korea	Nacif Elias; Lebanon	Keita Nagashima; Japan
Half middleweight (−81 kg)	Kim Jae-bum; South Korea	Nacif Elias; Lebanon	Nyamsürengiin Dagvasüren; Mongolia
Middleweight (−90 kg)	Yuya Yoshida; Japan	Dilshod Choriev; Uzbekistan	Gwak Dong-han; South Korea
Middleweight (−90 kg)	Yuya Yoshida; Japan	Dilshod Choriev; Uzbekistan	Lkhagvasürengiin Otgonbaatar; Mongolia
Half heavyweight (−100 kg)	Naidangiin Tüvshinbayar; Mongolia	Maxim Rakov; Kazakhstan	Ramziddin Sayidov; Uzbekistan
Half heavyweight (−100 kg)	Naidangiin Tüvshinbayar; Mongolia	Maxim Rakov; Kazakhstan	Cho Gu-ham; South Korea
Heavyweight (+100 kg)	Takeshi Ojitani; Japan	Ölziibayaryn Düürenbayar; Mongolia	Abdullo Tangriev; Uzbekistan
Heavyweight (+100 kg)	Takeshi Ojitani; Japan	Ölziibayaryn Düürenbayar; Mongolia	Kim Sung-min; South Korea
Team	South Korea; Choi Gwang-hyeon; Youn Tae-ho; Bang Gui-man; Kim Jae-bum; Gwak Dong-han; Lee Kyu-won; Kim Sung-min	Kazakhstan; Azamat Mukanov; Yeldos Smetov; Dastan Ykybayev; Aziz Kalkamanuly; Timur Bolat; Maxim Rakov; Yerzhan Shynkeyev	Uzbekistan; Mirzohid Farmonov; Rishod Sobirov; Navruz Jurakobilov; Sarvar Shomurodov; Yakhyo Imamov; Dilshod Choriev; Soyib Kurbonov; Abdullo Tangriev
Team	South Korea; Choi Gwang-hyeon; Youn Tae-ho; Bang Gui-man; Kim Jae-bum; Gwak Dong-han; Lee Kyu-won; Kim Sung-min	Kazakhstan; Azamat Mukanov; Yeldos Smetov; Dastan Ykybayev; Aziz Kalkamanuly; Timur Bolat; Maxim Rakov; Yerzhan Shynkeyev	Japan; Tomofumi Takajo; Toru Shishime; Hiroyuki Akimoto; Keita Nagashima; Yuya Yoshida; Yusuke Kumashiro; Takeshi Ojitani

=== Women ===
Event	Gold	Silver	Bronze
Extra lightweight (−48 kg)	Mönkhbatyn Urantsetseg; Mongolia	Emi Yamagishi; Japan	Kim Sol-mi; North Korea
Extra lightweight (−48 kg)	Mönkhbatyn Urantsetseg; Mongolia	Emi Yamagishi; Japan	Jeong Bo-kyeong; South Korea
Half lightweight (−52 kg)	Misato Nakamura; Japan	Gülbadam Babamuratowa; Turkmenistan	Jung Eun-jung; South Korea
Half lightweight (−52 kg)	Misato Nakamura; Japan	Gülbadam Babamuratowa; Turkmenistan	Lenariya Mingazova; Kazakhstan
Lightweight (−57 kg)	Anzu Yamamoto; Japan	Kim Jan-di; South Korea	Ri Hyo-sun; North Korea
Lightweight (−57 kg)	Anzu Yamamoto; Japan	Kim Jan-di; South Korea	Dorjsürengiin Sumiyaa; Mongolia
Half middleweight (−63 kg)	Joung Da-woon; South Korea	Yang Junxia; China	Marian Urdabayeva; Kazakhstan
Half middleweight (−63 kg)	Joung Da-woon; South Korea	Yang Junxia; China	Kana Abe; Japan
Middleweight (−70 kg)	Kim Seong-yeon; South Korea	Chizuru Arai; Japan	Chen Fei; China
Middleweight (−70 kg)	Kim Seong-yeon; South Korea	Chizuru Arai; Japan	Tsend-Ayuushiin Naranjargal; Mongolia
Half heavyweight (−78 kg)	Jeong Gyeong-mi; South Korea	Sol Kyong; North Korea	Zhang Zhehui; China
Half heavyweight (−78 kg)	Jeong Gyeong-mi; South Korea	Sol Kyong; North Korea	Mami Umeki; Japan
Heavyweight (+78 kg)	Ma Sisi; China	Nami Inamori; Japan	Thonthan Satjadet; Thailand
Heavyweight (+78 kg)	Ma Sisi; China	Nami Inamori; Japan	Kim Eun-kyeong; South Korea
Team	Japan; Misato Nakamura; Emi Yamagishi; Anzu Yamamoto; Kana Abe; Chizuru Arai; Nami Inamori; Mami Umeki	South Korea; Jeong Bo-kyeong; Jung Eun-jung; Kim Jan-di; Bak Ji-yun; Joung Da-woon; Kim Seong-yeon; Kim Eun-kyeong; Lee Jung-eun	China; Ma Yingnan; Wu Shugen; Zhou Ying; Yang Junxia; Chen Fei; Ma Sisi; Zhang Zhehui
Team	Japan; Misato Nakamura; Emi Yamagishi; Anzu Yamamoto; Kana Abe; Chizuru Arai; Nami Inamori; Mami Umeki	South Korea; Jeong Bo-kyeong; Jung Eun-jung; Kim Jan-di; Bak Ji-yun; Joung Da-woon; Kim Seong-yeon; Kim Eun-kyeong; Lee Jung-eun	North Korea; Kim Sol-mi; Ri Chang-ok; Ri Hyo-sun; Kim Su-gyong; Kim Jong-sun; Sol Kyong

== Medal table ==
Rank	Nation	Gold	Silver	Bronze	Total
1	Japan (JPN)	6	4	5	15
2	South Korea (KOR)	5	2	8	15
3	Mongolia (MGL)	3	3	4	10
4	Kazakhstan (KAZ)	1	2	3	6
5	China (CHN)	1	1	3	5
6	North Korea (PRK)	0	1	4	5
6	Uzbekistan (UZB)	0	1	4	5
8	Lebanon (LIB)	0	1	0	1
8	Turkmenistan (TKM)	0	1	0	1
10	Thailand (THA)	0	0	1	1
Totals (10 entries)		16	16	32	64

== Participating nations ==
A total of 218 athletes from 33 nations competed in judo at the 2014 Asian Games:

- Afghanistan (7)
- China (14)
- Chinese Taipei (8)
- Hong Kong (4)
- India (4)
- Indonesia (3)
- Iran (5)
- Japan (14)
- Jordan (2)
- Kazakhstan (14)
- Kuwait (4)
- Kyrgyzstan (9)
- Laos (5)
- Lebanon (4)
- Macau (5)
- Mongolia (18)
- Myanmar (3)
- Nepal (7)
- North Korea (10)
- Pakistan (1)
- Palestine (2)
- Philippines (2)
- Qatar (3)
- Saudi Arabia (4)
- Singapore (2)
- South Korea (18)
- Syria (2)
- Tajikistan (7)
- Thailand (8)
- Turkmenistan (11)
- Uzbekistan (12)
- Vietnam (2)
- Yemen (4)
