= Albina Amangeldiyeva =

Kazakhstani judoka

Personal information
- Born: 1 November 1988 (age 37)
- Occupation: Judoka

Sport
- Country: Kazakhstan
- Sport: Judo
- Weight class: ‍–‍78 kg

Achievements and titles
- World Champ.: R32 (2014, 2015, 2017)
- Asian Champ.: 5th (2013, 2015, 2016, 2017)
Medal record
Women's judo
Representing Kazakhstan
IJF Grand Prix
Silver medal – second place	2013 Almaty	‍–‍78 kg
Silver medal – second place	2016 Almaty	‍–‍78 kg
Silver medal – second place	2016 Tashkent	‍–‍78 kg
Bronze medal – third place	2013 Tashkent	‍–‍78 kg
Bronze medal – third place	2017 Antalya	‍–‍78 kg

Profile at external databases
- IJF: 1908
- JudoInside.com: 46292
- Updated on 7 December 2022

Albina Amangeldiyeva (born 1 November 1988) is a Kazakhstani judoka.

Amangeldiyeva is a bronze medalist from the 2017 Judo Grand Prix Antalya in the ‍–‍78 kg category.
