= 2013 World Judo Championships – Women's 78 kg =

Judo competition

Judo Women's 78 kg at the 2013 World Judo Championships
- Venue: Ginásio do Maracanãzinho
- Location: Rio de Janeiro, Brazil
- Date: 30 August 2013
- Competitors: 29 from 23 nations

Medalists
gold medal	Sol Ky-Ong (1st title)	North Korea
silver medal	Marhinde Verkerk	Netherlands
bronze medal	Mayra Aguiar	Brazil
bronze medal	Audrey Tcheuméo	France

Competition at external databases
- Links: IJF • JudoInside

The women's 78 kg competition of the 2013 World Judo Championships was held on August 30.

== Medalists ==
Gold	Silver	Bronze
Sol Ky-Ong (PRK)	Marhinde Verkerk (NED)	Mayra Aguiar (BRA); Audrey Tcheuméo (FRA)

== Results ==
=== Pool A ===
Quarterfinals		Semifinals		Final
		(Brazil) Mayra Aguiar	010
(Venezuela) Keivi Pinto	000	(Italy) Assunta Galeone	000
(Italy) Assunta Galeone	100			(Brazil) Mayra Aguiar	000
(Japan) Akari Ogata	000			(Netherlands) Marhinde Verkerk	100
(Netherlands) Marhinde Verkerk	000	(Netherlands) Marhinde Verkerk	001
(Canada) Amy Cotton	100	(Canada) Amy Cotton	000
(Ecuador) Diana Chalá	000

=== Pool B ===
Quarterfinals		Semifinals		Final
(France) Lucie Louette	000
(Cuba) Kaliema Antomarchi	100	(Cuba) Kaliema Antomarchi	100
(Australia) Isabelle Kopecny	010	(Australia) Isabelle Kopecny	000
(Colombia) Estefania Taborda	000			(Cuba) Kaliema Antomarchi	101
(Germany) Luise Malzahn	002			(Ukraine) Viktoriia Turks	010
(Ukraine) Viktoriia Turks	010	(Ukraine) Viktoriia Turks	101
(United Kingdom) Gemma Gibbons	011	(United Kingdom) Gemma Gibbons	000
(Kazakhstan) Anar Seitimova	000

=== Pool C ===
Quarterfinals		Semifinals		Final
		(Hungary) Abigél Joó	000
(North Korea) Sol Ky-Ong	000	(North Korea) Sol Ky-Ong	101
(Germany) Kerstin Thiele	000			(North Korea) Sol Ky-Ong	011
(Slovenia) Anamari Velenšek	100			(Japan) Ruika Sato	001
(United Kingdom) Natalie Powell	000	(Slovenia) Anamari Velenšek	000
(Japan) Ruika Sato	100	(Japan) Ruika Sato	010
(Mongolia) Munkhtuya Battulga	000

=== Pool D ===
Quarterfinals		Semifinals		Final
		(France) Audrey Tcheuméo	101
(United States) Samantha Bleier	010	(United States) Samantha Bleier	000
(China) Liu Dan	000			(France) Audrey Tcheuméo	000
(Canada) Catherine Roberge	010			(Canada) Catherine Roberge	100
(Netherlands) Iris Lemmen	000	(Canada) Catherine Roberge	010
(Spain) Marta Tort	100	(Spain) Marta Tort	001
(South Korea) Jung Da-Woon	000

=== Finals ===
Semi-finals
(Netherlands) Marhinde Verkerk	001
(Cuba) Kaliema Antomarchi	000
(North Korea) Sol Ky-Ong	100
(Canada) Catherine Roberge	000

Final
(Netherlands) Marhinde Verkerk	000
(North Korea) Sol Ky-Ong	010

=== Repechage ===
Repechage		Third place
(Brazil) Mayra Aguiar	100
(Ukraine) Viktoriia Turks	000	(Brazil) Mayra Aguiar	100
		(Canada) Catherine Roberge	000

Repechage		Third place
(Japan) Ruika Sato	000
(France) Audrey Tcheuméo	001	(France) Audrey Tcheuméo	001
		(Cuba) Kaliema Antomarchi	000
