= Judo at the 2016 Summer Olympics – Women's 78 kg =

Women's 78 kg at the Games of the XXXI Olympiad
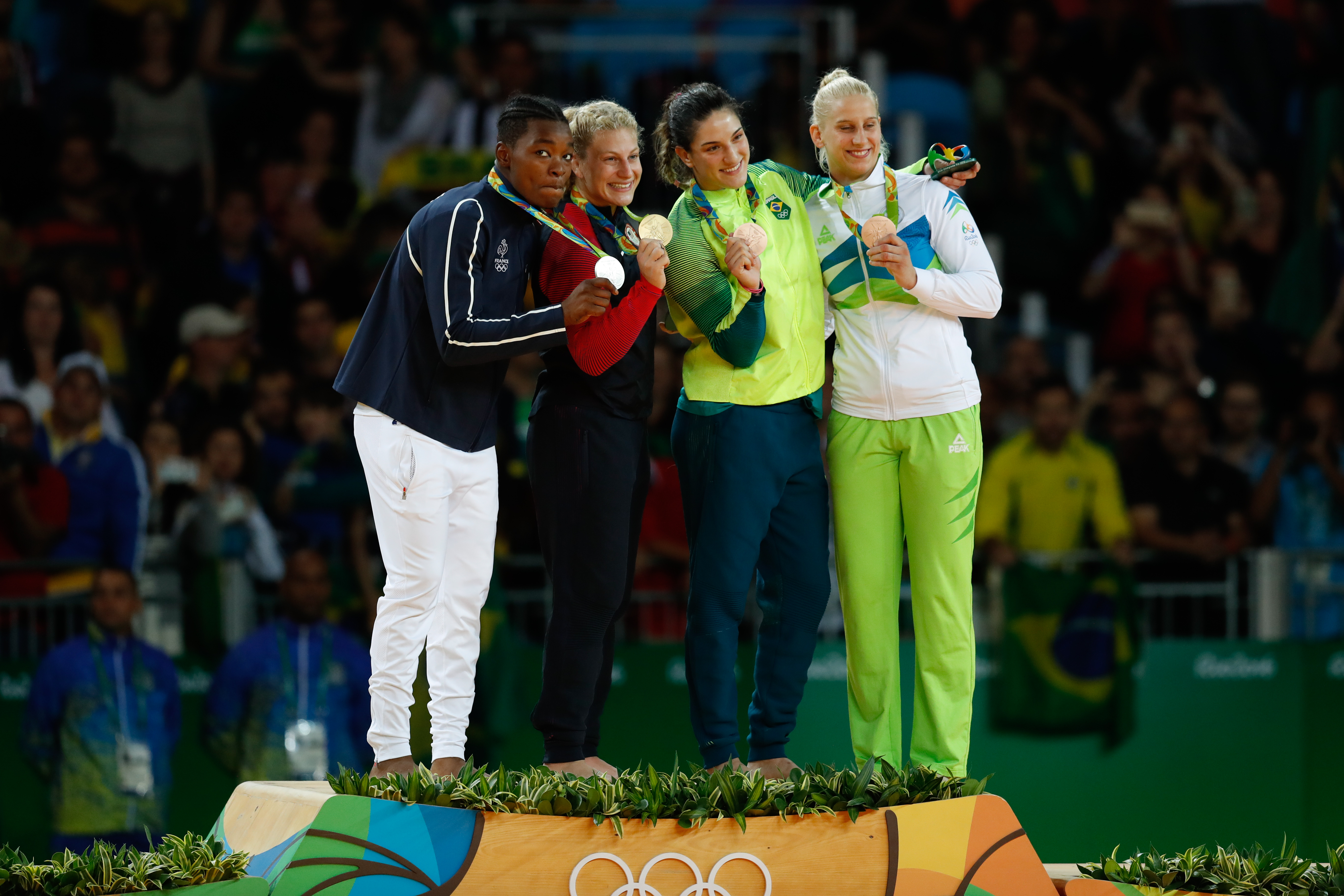
- Medalists
- Venue: Carioca Arena 2
- Date: 11 August 2016
- Competitors: 18 from 18 nations

Medalists
1st place, gold medalist(s)		Kayla Harrison	United States
2nd place, silver medalist(s)		Audrey Tcheuméo	France
3rd place, bronze medalist(s)		Mayra Aguiar	Brazil
3rd place, bronze medalist(s)		Anamari Velenšek	Slovenia

The women's 78 kg competition in judo at the 2016 Summer Olympics in Rio de Janeiro was held on 11 August at the Carioca Arena 2.

The gold and silver medals were determined by a single-elimination tournament, with the winner of the final taking gold and the loser receiving silver. Judo events awarded two bronze medals. Quarterfinal losers competed in a repechage match for the right to face a semifinal loser for a bronze medal (that is, the judokas defeated in quarterfinals A and B competed against each other, with the winner of that match facing the semifinal loser from the other half of the bracket).

The medals for the competition were presented by Habu Gumel, Nigeria, member of the International Olympic Committee and the gifts were presented by Lennie Niit, International Judo Federation vice president.

== Results ==
=== Finals ===
Semi-finals
Kayla Harrison (USA)	100
Anamari Velenšek (SLO)	000
Audrey Tcheuméo (FRA)	000
Mayra Aguiar (BRA)	000

Final
Kayla Harrison (USA)	100
Audrey Tcheuméo (FRA)	000

=== Repechages ===
Repechage		Bronze medal
Abigél Joó (HUN)	000
Yalennis Castillo (CUB)	001	Yalennis Castillo (CUB)	000
		Mayra Aguiar (BRA)	001

Repechage		Bronze medal
Natalie Powell (GBR)	000
Luise Malzahn (GER)	100	Luise Malzahn (GER)	000
		Anamari Velenšek (SLO)	100

=== Pool A ===
First round
Pürevjargalyn Lkhamdegd (MGL)	000
Abigél Joó (HUN)	111

Second round
Kayla Harrison (USA)	100
Zhang Zhehui (CHN)	000
Mami Umeki (JPN)	000
Abigél Joó (HUN)	002

Quarterfinals
Kayla Harrison (USA)	100
Abigél Joó (HUN)	000

=== Pool B ===
First round	Second round		Quarterfinals
	Marhinde Verkerk (NED)	000
	Yalennis Castillo (CUB)	000
			Yalennis Castillo (CUB)	000
			Anamari Velenšek (SLO)	100
	Anamari Velenšek (SLO)	001
	Viktoriya Turks (UKR)	000

=== Pool C ===
First round	Second round		Quarterfinals
	Audrey Tcheuméo (FRA)	100
	Sol Kyong (PRK)	000
			Audrey Tcheuméo (FRA)	000
			Natalie Powell (GBR)	000
	Natalie Powell (GBR)	100
	Sarah Myriam Mazouz (GAB)	000

=== Pool D ===
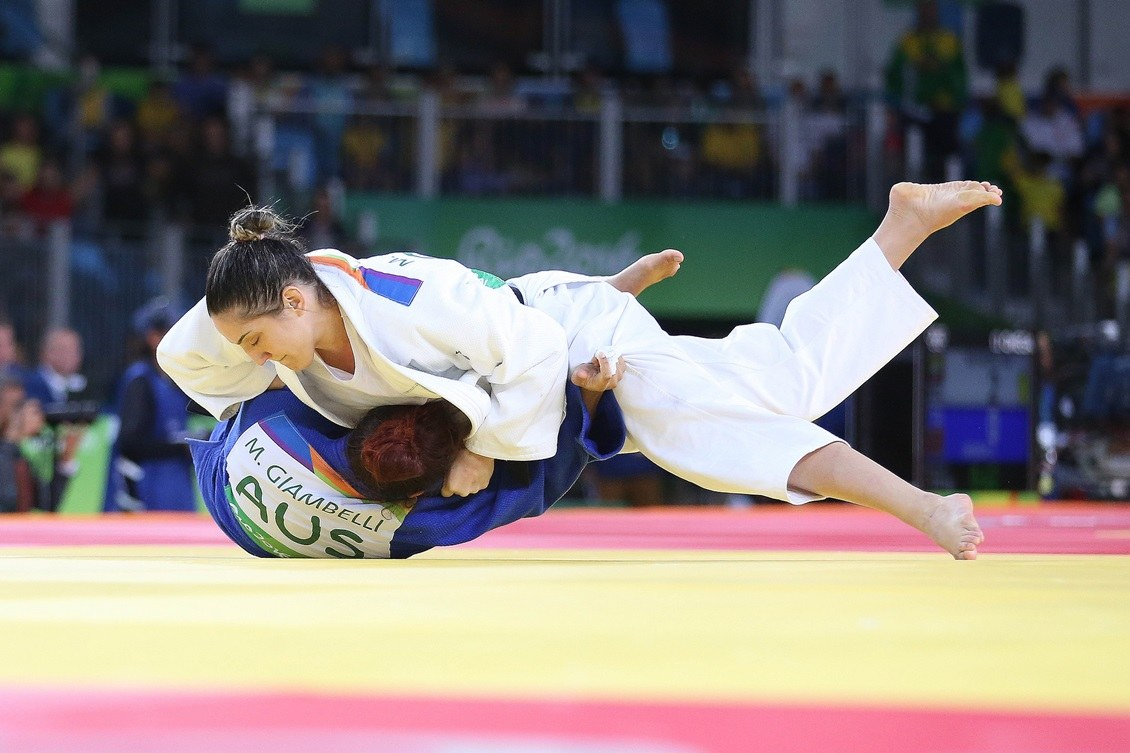
Mayra Aguiar (BRA) vs Miranda Giambelli (AUS)

First round
Hortence Atangana (CMR)	000
Daria Pogorzelec (POL)	000

Second round
Mayra Aguiar (BRA)	100
Miranda Giambelli (AUS)	000
Luise Malzahn (GER)	000
Daria Pogorzelec (POL)	000

Quarterfinals
Mayra Aguiar (BRA)	000
Luise Malzahn (GER)	000
