= Judo at the 2014 Asian Games – Men's 81 kg =

Judo competition

Men's 81 kg at the 2014 Asian Games
- Venue: Dowon Gymnasium
- Date: 21 September 2014
- Competitors: 17 from 17 nations

Medalists
gold medal	Kim Jae-bum	South Korea
silver medal	Nacif Elias	Lebanon
bronze medal	Keita Nagashima	Japan
bronze medal	Nyamsürengiin Dagvasüren	Mongolia

The men's 81 kilograms (Half middleweight) competition at the 2014 Asian Games in Incheon was held on 21 September at the Dowon Gymnasium.

== Schedule ==
All times are Korea Standard Time (UTC+09:00)

Date	Time	Event
Sunday, 21 September 2014	14:00	Elimination round of 32
Sunday, 21 September 2014	14:00	Elimination round of 16
Sunday, 21 September 2014	14:00	Quarterfinals
Sunday, 21 September 2014	14:00	Semifinals
Sunday, 21 September 2014	14:00	Final of repechage
Sunday, 21 September 2014	19:00	Finals

== Results ==
=== Main bracket ===
==== Final ====
Gold medal contest
Nacif Elias (LIB)	000
Kim Jae-bum (KOR)	000

==== Top half ====
Elimination round of 32
Nopachai Kocharat (THA)	000
Erihemubatu (CHN)	100

Elimination round of 16
Yakhyo Imamov (UZB)
Bye
Aziz Kalkamanuly (KAZ)	100
Putu Wiradamungga (INA)	000
Amir Ghaseminejad (IRI)	101
Farhod Rahimov (TJK)	000
Nacif Elias (LIB)	101
Erihemubatu (CHN)	000

Quarterfinals
Yakhyo Imamov (UZB)	000
Aziz Kalkamanuly (KAZ)	100
Amir Ghaseminejad (IRI)	000
Nacif Elias (LIB)	101

Semifinals
Aziz Kalkamanuly (KAZ)	000
Nacif Elias (LIB)	000

==== Bottom half ====
Elimination round of 32
Meshal Sheaibi (KUW)	000
Tejen Tejenow (TKM)	100

Elimination round of 16
Keita Nagashima (JPN)	100
Chittakon Xayasan (LAO)	000
Nyamsürengiin Dagvasüren (MGL)	100
Mohammad Mosa (AFG)	000
Kim Jae-bum (KOR)	100
Waleed Al-Kabzari (YEM)	000
Pak Hong-wi (PRK)	102
Tejen Tejenow (TKM)	000

Quarterfinals
Keita Nagashima (JPN)	010
Nyamsürengiin Dagvasüren (MGL)	000
Kim Jae-bum (KOR)	100
Pak Hong-wi (PRK)	000

Semifinals
Keita Nagashima (JPN)	000
Kim Jae-bum (KOR)	000

=== Repechage ===
Final of repechage
Yakhyo Imamov (UZB)	100
Amir Ghaseminejad (IRI)	000
Nyamsürengiin Dagvasüren (MGL)	010
Pak Hong-wi (PRK)	000

Bronze medal contests
Yakhyo Imamov (UZB)	000
Keita Nagashima (JPN)	100
Nyamsürengiin Dagvasüren (MGL)	010
Aziz Kalkamanuly (KAZ)	000
