= Judo at the 2014 Asian Games – Women's 78 kg =

Judo competition

Women's 78 kg at the 2014 Asian Games
- Venue: Dowon Gymnasium
- Date: 22 September 2014
- Competitors: 7 from 7 nations

Medalists
gold medal	Jeong Gyeong-mi	South Korea
silver medal	Sol Kyong	North Korea
bronze medal	Zhang Zhehui	China
bronze medal	Mami Umeki	Japan

The women's 78 kilograms (Half heavyweight) competition at the 2014 Asian Games in Incheon was held on 22 September at the Dowon Gymnasium.

== Schedule ==
All times are Korea Standard Time (UTC+09:00)

Date	Time	Event
Monday, 22 September 2014	14:00	Quarterfinals
Monday, 22 September 2014	14:00	Semifinals
Monday, 22 September 2014	14:00	Final of repechage
Monday, 22 September 2014	19:00	Finals

== Results ==
=== Main bracket ===
Quarterfinals		Semifinals		Gold medal contest
		Jeong Gyeong-mi (KOR)	100
Wang Szu-chu (TPE)	000	Battulgyn Mönkhtuyaa (MGL)	000
Battulgyn Mönkhtuyaa (MGL)	100			Jeong Gyeong-mi (KOR)	000
Sol Kyong (PRK)	010			Sol Kyong (PRK)	000
Mami Umeki (JPN)	000	Sol Kyong (PRK)	100
Albina Amangeldiyeva (KAZ)	000	Zhang Zhehui (CHN)	000
Zhang Zhehui (CHN)	000

=== Repechage ===
Final of repechage
Mami Umeki (JPN)	100
Albina Amangeldiyeva (KAZ)	000

Bronze medal contests
Wang Szu-chu (TPE)	000
Zhang Zhehui (CHN)	000
Mami Umeki (JPN)	100
Battulgyn Mönkhtuyaa (MGL)	000
