= Zhang Zhehui =

Chinese judoka (born 1988)

Personal information
- Born: 17 January 1988 (age 38)
- Occupation: Judoka

Sport
- Country: China
- Sport: Judo
- Weight class: ‍–‍78 kg

Achievements and titles
- Olympic Games: R16 (2016)
- World Champ.: R32 (2010, 2010, 2011, 2015)
- Asian Champ.: (gold) (2016)
Medal record
Women's judo
Representing China
Asian Games
| Bronze medal – third place | 2014 Incheon | ‍–‍78 kg |
| Bronze medal – third place | 2014 Incheon | Women's team |
Asian Championships
| Gold medal – first place | 2016 Tashkent | ‍–‍78 kg |
| Silver medal – second place | 2012 Tashkent | ‍–‍78 kg |
| Bronze medal – third place | 2013 Bangkok | ‍–‍78 kg |
| Bronze medal – third place | 2015 Kuwait City | ‍–‍78 kg |
IJF Grand Prix
| Gold medal – first place | 2016 Almaty | ‍–‍78 kg |
| Silver medal – second place | 2010 Abu Dhabi | ‍–‍78 kg |
Asian Junior Championships
| Bronze medal – third place | 2006 Jeju | ‍–‍78 kg |

Profile at external databases
- IJF: 2968
- JudoInside.com: 42981
- Updated on 8 December 2022

Zhang Zhehui (born 17 January 1988) is a Chinese judoka. She competed at the 2016 Summer Olympics in the women's 78 kg event, in which she was eliminated in the second round by Kayla Harrison.
