= Viktoriya Turks =

Ukrainian judoka (born 1987)

Personal information
- Born: 20 October 1987 (age 38)
- Occupation: Judoka

Sport
- Country: Ukraine
- Sport: Judo
- Weight class: ‍–‍78 kg

Achievements and titles
- Olympic Games: R16 (2016)
- World Champ.: 7th (2013)
- European Champ.: 7th (2013, 2013)
Medal record
Women's judo
Representing Ukraine
IJF Grand Slam
Silver medal – second place	2014 Abu Dhabi	‍–‍78 kg
IJF Grand Prix
Silver medal – second place	2013 Jeju	‍–‍78 kg
Silver medal – second place	2014 Tbilisi	‍–‍78 kg
Silver medal – second place	2015 Zagreb	‍–‍78 kg
Bronze medal – third place	2013 Almaty	‍–‍78 kg
Bronze medal – third place	2014 Zagreb	‍–‍78 kg
Bronze medal – third place	2014 Astana	‍–‍78 kg
Bronze medal – third place	2015 Samsun	‍–‍78 kg
Bronze medal – third place	2016 Almaty	‍–‍78 kg
Summer Universiade
Gold medal – first place	2011 Shenzhen	‍–‍78 kg

Profile at external databases
- IJF: 4435
- JudoInside.com: 42680
- Updated on 23 November 2022

Viktoriya Turks (born 20 October 1987) is a Ukrainian judoka. She competed at the 2016 Summer Olympics in the women's 78 kg event, in which she was eliminated in the second round by Anamari Velenšek.
