= Miranda Giambelli =

Australian judoka (born 1992)

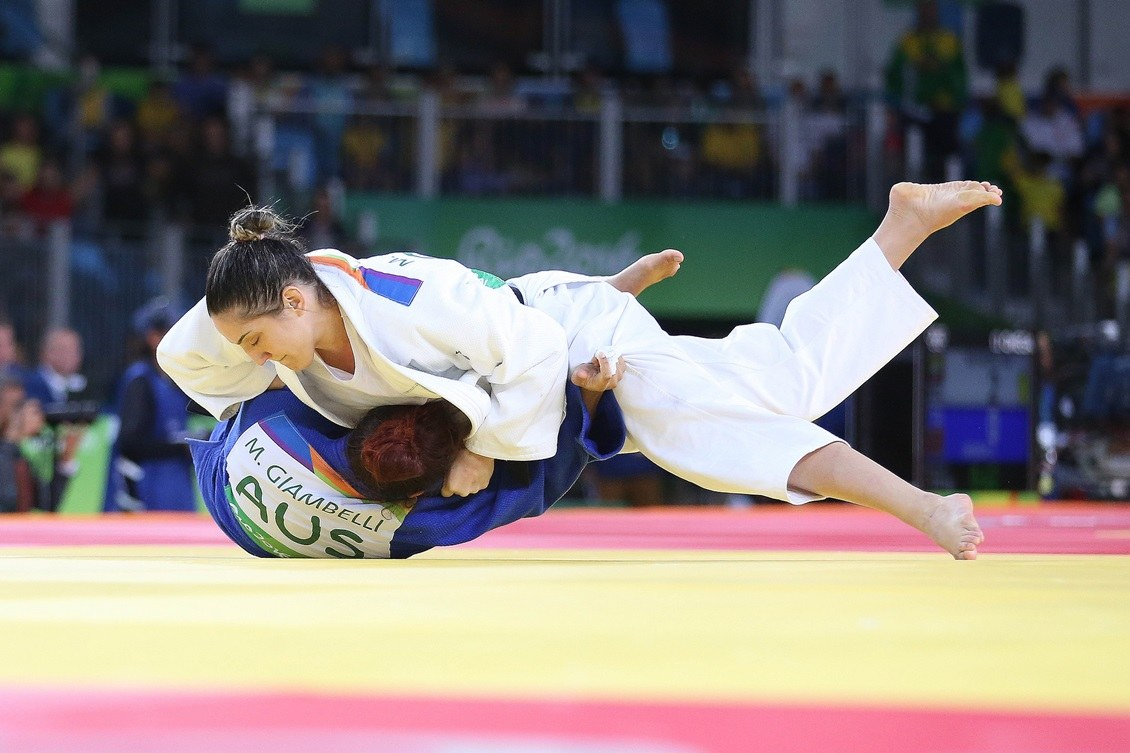
- Bronze medal match between Giambelli and Mayra Aguiar at 2016 Summer Olympics

Miranda Giambelli (born 22 May 1992) is an Australian judoka. She competed at the 2016 Summer Olympics in the women's 78 kg event, in which she was eliminated in the second round by Mayra Aguiar.
