= Zhou Chao =

Chinese judoka (born 1987)

Personal information
- Born: 12 January 1987 (age 39) Handan, Hebei, China
- Occupation: Judoka

Sport
- Country: China
- Sport: Judo
- Weight class: ‍–‍70 kg

Achievements and titles
- Olympic Games: R32 (2016)
- World Champ.: R16 (2014)
- Asian Champ.: (bronze) (2015, 2016)
Medal record
Women's judo
Representing China
Asian Championships
Bronze medal – third place	2015 Kuwait City	‍–‍70 kg
Bronze medal – third place	2016 Tashkent	‍–‍70 kg
IJF Grand Prix
Silver medal – second place	2015 Ulaanbaatar	‍–‍70 kg
Bronze medal – third place	2012 Qingdao	‍–‍70 kg
Bronze medal – third place	2014 Qingdao	‍–‍70 kg
Bronze medal – third place	2015 Tashkent	‍–‍70 kg

Profile at external databases
- IJF: 11708
- JudoInside.com: 62558
- Updated on 16 December 2022

Zhou Chao (born 12 January 1987) is a Chinese judoka.

She competed at the 2016 Summer Olympics in Rio de Janeiro, in the women's 70 kg.
