= Davaadorjiin Tömörkhüleg =

Mongolian judoka (born 1990)

Personal information
- Native name: Даваадоржийн Төмөрхүлэг
- Born: 29 September 1990 (age 35) Uvurkhangai, Mongolia
- Occupation: Judoka
- Height: 172 cm (5 ft 8 in)

Sport
- Country: Mongolia
- Sport: Judo, Sambo
- Weight class: ‍–‍60 kg, ‍–‍66 kg

Achievements and titles
- Olympic Games: 7th (2016)
- World Champ.: 5th (2015)
- Asian Champ.: (gold) (2013, 2014)
- National finals: (gold) (2011, 2015)
Medal record
Representing Mongolia
Men's judo
World Championships
Bronze medal – third place	2015 Astana	Men's team
Asian Games
Gold medal – first place	2014 Incheon	‍–‍66 kg
Asian Championships
Gold medal – first place	2013 Bangkok	‍–‍66 kg
Silver medal – second place	2011 Abu Dhabi	‍–‍60 kg
Bronze medal – third place	2015 Kuwait	‍–‍66 kg
Bronze medal – third place	2016 Tashkent	‍–‍66 kg
World Masters
Silver medal – second place	2016 Guadalajara	‍–‍66 kg
Bronze medal – third place	2015 Rabat	‍–‍66 kg
IJF Grand Slam
Gold medal – first place	2013 Baku	‍–‍66 kg
Gold medal – first place	2015 Paris	‍–‍66 kg
Silver medal – second place	2012 Moscow	‍–‍60 kg
Silver medal – second place	2013 Paris	‍–‍66 kg
Silver medal – second place	2016 Paris	‍–‍66 kg
Bronze medal – third place	2011 Moscow	‍–‍60 kg
Bronze medal – third place	2015 Tokyo	‍–‍66 kg
IJF Grand Prix
Gold medal – first place	2011 Amsterdam	‍–‍60 kg
Gold medal – first place	2012 Qingdao	‍–‍66 kg
Gold medal – first place	2015 Tbilisi	‍–‍66 kg
Gold medal – first place	2015 Ulaanbaatar	‍–‍66 kg
Silver medal – second place	2013 Qingdao	‍–‍66 kg
Silver medal – second place	2014 Ulaanbaatar	‍–‍66 kg
Silver medal – second place	2015 Düsseldorf	‍–‍66 kg
Silver medal – second place	2015 Samsun	‍–‍66 kg
Silver medal – second place	2015 Qingdao	‍–‍66 kg
Silver medal – second place	2017 Tbilisi	‍–‍66 kg
Bronze medal – third place	2010 Düsseldorf	‍–‍60 kg
Bronze medal – third place	2013 Ulaanbaatar	‍–‍66 kg
Bronze medal – third place	2014 Düsseldorf	‍–‍66 kg
Bronze medal – third place	2017 Antalya	‍–‍66 kg
Bronze medal – third place	2019 Zagreb	‍–‍66 kg
World Juniors Championships
Silver medal – second place	2008 Bangkok	‍–‍60 kg
Silver medal – second place	2009 Paris	‍–‍60 kg
Men's Sambo
World Championships
Gold medal – first place	2014 Narita	‍–‍68 kg

Profile at external databases
- IJF: 1530
- JudoInside.com: 60805
- Updated on 20 November 2022

Davaadorjiin Tömörkhüleg (born 29 September 1990, Ulaanbaatar) is a Mongolian judoka who competes in the men's ‍–‍66 kg category.

Davaadorjiin is a two-time winner of the Asian Championships, in 2013 and 2014, along with bronze medals in 2015 and 2016. He had previously won a silver at the 2011 Asian Championships in the ‍–‍60 kg division. He also won two silver medals in the ‍–‍60 kg division at World Juniors Championships in 2008 and 2009.

At the 2012 Summer Olympics, Davaadorjiin was defeated in the second round of the Men's ‍–‍60 kg event by eventual bronze medalist Felipe Kitadai. At the 2016 Summer Olympics, he had moved up to the men's half-lightweight (‍–‍66 kg) division. In Rio, he beat Sulaiman Hamad and Houd Zourdani before losing to eventual gold medalist Fabio Basile in the quarterfinals. Because his opponent reached the final, Tömörkhüleg was entered into the repechage. He lost his match in the repechage to Antoine Bouchard.
