= Kim Sol-mi =

North Korean judoka (born 1990)

Personal information
- Born: 20 November 1990 (age 35)
- Occupation: Judoka
- Height: 155 cm (5 ft 1 in)

Korean name
- Hangul: 김솔미
- RR: Gim Solmi
- MR: Kim Solmi
- IPA: [kim.sol.mi]

Sport
- Country: North Korea
- Sport: Judo
- Weight class: ‍–‍48 kg

Achievements and titles
- Olympic Games: R16 (2016)
- World Champ.: 5th (2013)
- Asian Champ.: (silver) (2013)
Medal record
Women's judo
Representing North Korea
Asian Games
Bronze medal – third place	2014 Incheon	‍–‍48 kg
Bronze medal – third place	2014 Incheon	Women's team
Asian Championships
Silver medal – second place	2013 Bangkok	‍–‍48 kg
Bronze medal – third place	2015 Kuwait	‍–‍48 kg
Bronze medal – third place	2016 Tashkent	‍–‍48 kg
IJF Grand Slam
Bronze medal – third place	2014 Abu Dhabi	‍–‍48 kg
IJF Grand Prix
Bronze medal – third place	2014 Qingdao	‍–‍48 kg
Asian Junior Championships
Bronze medal – third place	2005 Beirut	‍–‍45 kg

Profile at external databases
- IJF: 4966
- JudoInside.com: 68573
- Updated on 23 November 2022

Kim Sol-mi (Korean: 김솔미; born 20 November 1990) is a North Korean judoka.

Kim won gold at the 2011 World Military Judo Championship. At the 2013 World Judo Championships, in Rio de Janeiro, Brazil, she finished fifth. She took bronze at the 2014 Abu Dhabi Grand Slam in the United Arab Emirates. That year, she also took the bronze at the 2014 Qingdao Grand Prix in China. She took the bronze at the 2015 Asian Judo Championships in Kuwait.

At the 2016 Asian Judo Championships in Tashkent, Uzbekistan Kim finished third.

Kim competed in the women's (48 kg) judo event at the 2016 Summer Olympics in Rio de Janeiro, where she did not advance past her first match.

== See also ==
- North Korea at the 2016 Summer Olympics
