= Naranjargal Tsend-Ayush =

Mongolian judoka

Tsend-Ayush Naranjargal
- Born: Цэнд-Аюушын Наранжаргал; 27 January 1992 (age 34); Mongolia
- Nationality: Mongolian
- Height: 5 ft 7 in (1.70 m)
- Weight: 135 lb (61 kg; 9 st 9 lb)
- Division: Bantamweight
- Style: Judo
- Years active: 2022–present

Mixed martial arts record
- Total: 3
- Wins: 2
- By knockout: 1
- By submission: 1
- Losses: 1
- By decision: 1

Other information
- Notable club: Genco
- Mixed martial arts record from Sherdog
- Judo career
- Weight class: ‍–‍70 kg

Judo achievements and titles
- Olympic Games: R32 (2016)
- World Champ.: R16 (2010, 2013)
- Asian Champ.: (gold) (2015)
Medal record
Women's judo
Representing Mongolia
World Championships
Silver medal – second place	2014 Chelyabinsk	Women's team
Asian Games
Bronze medal – third place	2010 Guangzhou	‍–‍70 kg
Bronze medal – third place	2014 Incheon	‍–‍70 kg
Bronze medal – third place	2018 Jakarta	‍–‍70 kg
Asian Championships
Gold medal – first place	2015 Kuwait City	‍–‍70 kg
Silver medal – second place	2013 Bangkok	‍–‍70 kg
Bronze medal – third place	2011 Abu Dhabi	‍–‍70 kg
Bronze medal – third place	2012 Tashkent	‍–‍70 kg
IJF Grand Slam
Silver medal – second place	2012 Moscow	‍–‍70 kg
IJF Grand Prix
Gold medal – first place	2014 Ulaanbaatar	‍–‍70 kg
Silver medal – second place	2013 Ulaanbaatar	‍–‍70 kg
Silver medal – second place	2016 Almaty	‍–‍70 kg
Silver medal – second place	2016 Ulaanbaatar	‍–‍70 kg
Bronze medal – third place	2015 Samsun	‍–‍70 kg
World Juniors Championships
Silver medal – second place	2011 Cape Town	‍–‍70 kg
Asian Junior Championships
Gold medal – first place	2010 Bangkok	‍–‍70 kg
Asian Cadet Championships
Gold medal – first place	2007 Hyderabad	‍–‍57 kg
Mongolian National Championships
Gold medal – first place	2011, 2015, 2016, 2017, 2018, 2020	‍–‍70 kg/‍–‍78 kg

Profile at external judo databases
- IJF: 1521
- JudoInside.com: 50379

Tsend-Ayush Naranjargal (Mongolian: Цэнд-Аюушын Наранжаргал) is a female Mongolian judoka. She competed at the 2016 Summer Olympics in the women's 70 kg event, in which she was eliminated in the first round by Esther Stam.

== Judo career ==
Won the 2007 Asian Junior 57 kg class. At the 2009 East Asian Games, she finished 3rd in the 70 kg division and 2nd in the open division. After she won the 2010 Asian Juniors, she finished third at the Asian Games. She finished 3rd at the 2011 Asian Championships and she finished 2nd at the World Junior Championships. She finished third at the Asian Championships and the Grand Slam Moscow in 2012, but she missed out on the London Olympics because she was not in the top 14 world rankings for Olympic qualification. She finished second at the 2013 Asian Championships. In 2014 she won the East Asian Championships. In the finals of the Grand Prix Ulaanbaatar held in her hometown, she was defeated by South Korea's Hwang Yeo - seong . Became. She then held the IJFAt the seminar, armpits in this match were taken up as a case of extremely malicious fouls that can no longer be called sports. Although he lost in the first match at the world championship, he finished second in the world group. He finished 3rd at the Asian Games and won the 2015 Asian Championships. In the team match, in the first match against Japan, Nun- Ira Karen again tried to consolidate the foul, but this time foul loss was applied . She lost her opening match at the 2016 Rio de Janeiro Olympics. She finished third in three consecutive Asian Games in 2018.

In 2014, she finished third in the 72 kg class at Sambo World Championships.

== Mixed Martial Arts career ==
After going 2–0 on the regional scene, winning the bouts via first round submission and TKO stoppage, Tsend-Ayush faced Amanda Leve on February 3, 2023, at PFL Challenger Series 10, where she would lose the bout via unanimous decision.

== Mixed martial arts record ==
Professional record breakdown
3 matches	2 wins	1 loss
By knockout	1	0
By submission	1	0
By decision	0	1

Res.	Record	Opponent	Method	Event	Date	Round	Time	Location	Notes
Loss	2–1	Amanda Leve	Decision (unanimous)	PFL Challenger Series 10	February 3, 2023	3	5:00	Orlando, Florida, United States	
Win	2–0	Cheyanne Bowers	Submission (scarf hold armbar)	LFA 144	October 14, 2022	1	3:23	Sioux Falls, South Dakota, United States	Bantamweight bout.
Win	1–0	Tsogzolmaa Dorjsuren	TKO (punches)	Mongol FC Fight Night 4	March 18, 2022	1	1:50	Ulaanbaatar, Mongolia	Featherweight debut.
