= Jeong Gyeong-mi =

South Korean judoka (born 1985)

Personal information
- Born: 26 July 1985 (age 41)
- Occupation: Judoka

Korean name
- Hangul: 정경미
- RR: Jeong Gyeongmi
- MR: Chŏng Kyŏngmi

Sport
- Country: South Korea
- Sport: Judo
- Weight class: –78 kg

Achievements and titles
- Olympic Games: (bronze) (2008)
- World Champ.: (bronze) (2007)
- Asian Champ.: (gold) (2009, 2010, 2013, 2014)
Medal record
Women's judo
Representing South Korea
Olympic Games
Bronze medal – third place	2008 Beijing	‍–‍78 kg
World Championships
Bronze medal – third place	2007 Rio de Janeiro	‍–‍78 kg
Asian Games
Gold medal – first place	2010 Guangzhou	‍–‍78 kg
Gold medal – first place	2014 Incheon	‍–‍78 kg
Asian Championships
Gold medal – first place	2009 Taipei	‍–‍78 kg
Gold medal – first place	2013 Bangkok	‍–‍78 kg
Silver medal – second place	2008 Jeju	‍–‍78 kg
Silver medal – second place	2011 Abu Dhabi	‍–‍78 kg
Bronze medal – third place	2005 Tashkent	‍–‍78 kg
Bronze medal – third place	2012 Tashkent	‍–‍78 kg
World Masters
Silver medal – second place	2010 Suwon	‍–‍78 kg
Bronze medal – third place	2013 Tyumen	‍–‍78 kg
IJF Grand Slam
Silver medal – second place	2013 Tokyo	‍–‍78 kg
Bronze medal – third place	2008 Tokyo	‍–‍78 kg
IJF Grand Prix
Gold medal – first place	2013 Jeju	‍–‍78 kg
Silver medal – second place	2013 Rijeka	‍–‍78 kg
Bronze medal – third place	2011 Abu Dhabi	‍–‍78 kg
Asian Junior Championships
Bronze medal – third place	2003 Macau	‍–‍78 kg
Summer Universiade
Silver medal – second place	2009 Belgrade	‍–‍78 kg
Bronze medal – third place	2011 Shenzhen	‍–‍78 kg

Profile at external databases
- IJF: 61
- JudoInside.com: 26889
- Updated on 30 May 2023

Jeong Gyeong-mi (Korean: 정경미; pronounced [tɕʌŋ.ɡjʌŋ.mi]; born 26 July 1985) is a South Korean judoka. She was born in Gunsan, South Korea.

In 2006, she won her first international gold medal at the 18th World University Judo Championship in Suwon, South Korea. Jeong also won a bronze medal in the ‍–‍78 kg category at the 2007 World Judo Championships and a bronze medal at the 2008 Summer Olympics.
