= Judo at the 2010 Asian Games – Women's openweight =

Judo competition

Women's openweight at the 2010 Asian Games
- Venue: Huagong Gymnasium
- Date: 16 November 2010
- Competitors: 10 from 10 nations

Medalists
gold medal	Liu Huanyuan	China
silver medal	Kim Na-young	South Korea
bronze medal	Megumi Tachimoto	Japan
bronze medal	Dorjgotovyn Tserenkhand	Mongolia

The women's openweight competition at the 2010 Asian Games in Guangzhou, China was held on 16 November 2010 at the Huagong Gymnasium with ten competitors.

Liu Huanyuan of China won the gold medal.

== Schedule ==
All times are China Standard Time (UTC+08:00)

Date	Time	Event
Tuesday, 16 November 2010	10:00	Preliminary
Tuesday, 16 November 2010	10:00	Quarterfinals
Tuesday, 16 November 2010	15:00	Final of repechage
Tuesday, 16 November 2010	15:00	Final of table
Tuesday, 16 November 2010	15:00	Finals

== Results ==
=== Main bracket ===
Preliminary
Fouzia Mumtaz (PAK)	000
Sol Kyong (PRK)	100
Sarah Al-Salem (IOC)	000
Dinara Kakharova (KGZ)	100

Quarterfinals
Dorjgotovyn Tserenkhand (MGL)	100
Sol Kyong (PRK)	000
Liu Huanyuan (CHN)	100
Megumi Tachimoto (JPN)	000
Dinara Kakharova (KGZ)	000
Thonthan Bunduang (THA)	001
Kim Na-young (KOR)	100
Zarina Abdrassulova (KAZ)	000

Final of table
Dorjgotovyn Tserenkhand (MGL)	000
Liu Huanyuan (CHN)	100
Thonthan Bunduang (THA)	000
Kim Na-young (KOR)	101

Gold medal
Liu Huanyuan (CHN)	001
Kim Na-young (KOR)	000

=== Repechage ===
Final of repechage
Sol Kyong (PRK)	000
Megumi Tachimoto (JPN)	100
Dinara Kakharova (KGZ)	100
Zarina Abdrassulova (KAZ)	001

Bronze medals
Megumi Tachimoto (JPN)	100
Thonthan Bunduang (THA)	000
Dinara Kakharova (KGZ)	000
Dorjgotovyn Tserenkhand (MGL)	101
