= Tümen-Odyn Battögs =

Mongolian Olympic judoka (born 1981)

Personal information
- Nationality: (Mongolia) Mongol
- Born: 23 August 1981 (age 44) Mörön sum, Khövsgöl aimag, Mongolia
- Occupation: Judoka
- Height: 1.56 m (5 ft 1 1/2 in)
- Weight: 63 kg (139 lb)

Sport
- Country: Mongolia
- Sport: Judo
- Weight class: –57 kg, –63 kg

Achievements and titles
- Olympic Games: R16 (2008)
- World Champ.: R16 (2009, 2010)
- Asian Champ.: (bronze) (2008, 2009, 2010)
Medal record
Women's judo
Representing Mongolia
Asian Games
Bronze medal – third place	2010 Guangzhou	–57 kg
Asian Championships
Bronze medal – third place	2008 Jeju	–63 kg
Bronze medal – third place	2009 Taipei	–57 kg

Profile at external databases
- IJF: 204
- JudoInside.com: 43415
- Updated on 23 October 2022

Tümen-Odyn Battögs (also Battugs Tumen-Od, Mongolian: Түмэн-Одын Баттөгс; born 23 August 1981 in Mörön sum, Khövsgöl aimag) is a Mongolian judoka, who played for the half-middleweight category. She won a bronze medal for her division at the 2010 Asian Games in Guangzhou, China.

Battugs represented Mongolia at the 2008 Summer Olympics in Beijing, where she competed for the women's half-middleweight class (63 kg). She received a bye for the second preliminary round match, before losing out, by an ippon (full point) and a kuchiki taoshi (single leg takedown), to Germany's Anna von Harnier.
