= 2013 World Judo Championships – Women's 70 kg =

Judo competition

Judo Women's 70 kg at the 2013 World Judo Championships
- Venue: Ginásio do Maracanãzinho
- Location: Rio de Janeiro, Brazil
- Date: 30 August 2013
- Competitors: 33 from 29 nations

Medalists
gold medal	Yuri Alvear (2nd title)	Colombia
silver medal	Laura Vargas Koch	Germany
bronze medal	Kim Polling	Netherlands
bronze medal	Kim Seong-Yeon	South Korea

Competition at external databases
- Links: IJF • JudoInside

The women's 70 kg competition of the 2013 World Judo Championships was held on August 30.

== Medalists ==
Gold	Silver	Bronze
Yuri Alvear (COL)	Laura Vargas Koch (GER)	Kim Polling (NED); Kim Seong-Yeon (KOR)

== Results ==
=== Pool A ===
Quarterfinals		Semifinals		Final
(Netherlands) Kim Polling	111
(Ukraine) Luiza Gainutdinova	001	(Netherlands) Kim Polling	100
(Russia) Irina Gazieva	100	(Russia) Irina Gazieva	000
(Venezuela) Elvismar Rodríguez	000			(Netherlands) Kim Polling	002
(South Korea) Kim Seong-Yeon	100			(South Korea) Kim Seong-Yeon	010
(Australia) Sara Collins	000	(South Korea) Kim Seong-Yeon	101
(Mongolia) Tsend-Ayuushiin Naranjargal	100	(Mongolia) Tsend-Ayuushiin Naranjargal	000
(Bosnia and Herzegovina) Aleksandra Samardžić	000

=== Pool B ===
First Round
(Spain) María Bernabéu	101
(Bolivia) Anette Aguilar	000

Quarterfinals
(Netherlands) Linda Bolder	000
(Spain) María Bernabéu	000
(Germany) Laura Vargas Koch	100
(Ecuador) Vanessa Chala	000
(Cuba) Onix Cortés	000
(Japan) Haruka Tachimoto	000

Semifinals
(Spain) María Bernabéu	000
(Angola) Antonia Moreira	100
(Germany) Laura Vargas Koch	100
(Cuba) Onix Cortés	002

Final
(Angola) Antonia Moreira	000
(Germany) Laura Vargas Koch	110

=== Pool C ===
First Round
(Hungary) Franciska Szabó	102
(Venezuela) Maria Rojas	000

Quarterfinals
(Canada) Kelita Zupancic	100
(Hungary) Franciska Szabó	000
(Luxembourg) Lynn Mossong	000
(South Korea) Hwang Ye-Sul	000
(Brazil) Maria Portela	010
(Denmark) Emilie Sook	000
(Kazakhstan) Dinara Kudarova	100
(American Samoa) Julie Pasquale	010

Semifinals
(Canada) Kelita Zupancic	000
(South Korea) Hwang Ye-Sul	010
(Brazil) Maria Portela	100
(Kazakhstan) Dinara Kudarova	010

Final
(South Korea) Hwang Ye-Sul	001
(Brazil) Maria Portela	000

=== Pool D ===
First Round
(United States) Kathleen Sell	000
(Morocco) Assmaa Niang	101

Quarterfinals
(France) Lucie Décosse	100
(Morocco) Assmaa Niang	000
(Germany) Iljana Marzok	001
(Israel) Lior Wildikan	000
(Austria) Bernadette Graf	000
(Puerto Rico) María Pérez	100

Semifinals
(France) Lucie Décosse	100
(Germany) Iljana Marzok	000
(Puerto Rico) María Pérez	002
(Colombia) Yuri Alvear	010

Final
(France) Lucie Décosse	000
(Colombia) Yuri Alvear	001

=== Finals ===
Semi-finals
(South Korea) Kim Seong-Yeon	001
(Germany) Laura Vargas Koch	002
(South Korea) Hwang Ye-Sul	000
(Colombia) Yuri Alvear	103

Final
(Germany) Laura Vargas Koch	000
(Colombia) Yuri Alvear	101

=== Repechage ===
Repechage		Third place
(Netherlands) Kim Polling	100
(Angola) Antonia Moreira	000	(Netherlands) Kim Polling	100
		(South Korea) Hwang Ye-Sul	000

Repechage		Third place
(Brazil) Maria Portela	000
(France) Lucie Décosse	100	(France) Lucie Décosse	000
		(South Korea) Kim Seong-Yeon	001
