= Chen Fei (judoka) =

Chinese judoka (born 1990)

Personal information
- Born: 30 October 1990 (age 35) Tianjin, China
- Occupation: Judoka

Sport
- Country: China
- Sport: Judo
- Weight class: ‍–‍70 kg, ‍–‍78 kg

Achievements and titles
- Olympic Games: 5th (2012)
- World Champ.: R16 (2010)
- Asian Champ.: (bronze) (2010, 2011, 2014, 2021)
Medal record
Women's judo
Representing China
Asian Games
Bronze medal – third place	2010 Guangzhou	‍–‍70 kg
Bronze medal – third place	2014 Incheon	‍–‍70 kg
Bronze medal – third place	2014 Incheon	Women's team
Asian Championships
Bronze medal – third place	2011 Abu Dhabi	‍–‍70 kg
Bronze medal – third place	2021 Bishkek	‍–‍78 kg
World Masters
Bronze medal – third place	2019 Qingdao	‍–‍78 kg
IJF Grand Slam
Bronze medal – third place	2011 Moscow	‍–‍70 kg
Bronze medal – third place	2019 Paris	‍–‍78 kg
IJF Grand Prix
Gold medal – first place	2011 Düsseldorf	‍–‍70 kg
Gold medal – first place	2011 Qingdao	‍–‍70 kg
Gold medal – first place	2012 Qingdao	‍–‍70 kg
Gold medal – first place	2013 Qingdao	‍–‍70 kg
Silver medal – second place	2010 Qingdao	‍–‍70 kg
Bronze medal – third place	2009 Abu Dhabi	‍–‍70 kg
Bronze medal – third place	2011 Abu Dhabi	‍–‍70 kg
Bronze medal – third place	2016 Qingdao	‍–‍70 kg

Profile at external databases
- IJF: 1802
- JudoInside.com: 61597
- Updated on 20 November 2022

Chen Fei (Chinese: 陈飞; born 30 October 1990 in Tianjin) is a Chinese judoka. She competed in the 70 kg event at the 2012 Summer Olympics. She has competed at several World Championships and has won bronze at two Asian Games.
