= 2015 Judo Grand Prix Samsun =

Judo competition

Judo 2015 Judo Grand Prix Samsun
- Location: Samsun, Turkey
- Dates: 27–29 March 2015
- Competitors: 491 from 67 nations

Competition at external databases
- Links: IJF • EJU • JudoInside

The 2015 Judo Grand Prix Samsun was held in Samsun, Turkey from 27 to 29 March 2015.

== Medal summary ==
=== Men's events ===
Event	Gold	Silver	Bronze
Extra-lightweight (−60 kg)	Sharafuddin Lutfillaev (UZB)	Orkhan Safarov (AZE)	Lukhumi Chkhvimiani (GEO)
Extra-lightweight (−60 kg)	Sharafuddin Lutfillaev (UZB)	Orkhan Safarov (AZE)	Tsend-Ochiryn Tsogtbaatar (MGL)
Half-lightweight (−66 kg)	Rishod Sobirov (UZB)	Davaadorjiin Tömörkhüleg (MGL)	Abdula Abdulzhalilov (RUS)
Half-lightweight (−66 kg)	Rishod Sobirov (UZB)	Davaadorjiin Tömörkhüleg (MGL)	Sergiu Oleinic (POR)
Lightweight (−73 kg)	Rustam Orujov (AZE)	Hasan Vanlıoğlu (TUR)	Dex Elmont (NED)
Lightweight (−73 kg)	Rustam Orujov (AZE)	Hasan Vanlıoğlu (TUR)	Victor Scvortov (UAE)
Half-middleweight (−81 kg)	Loïc Pietri (FRA)	Sergiu Toma (UAE)	Ushangi Margiani (GEO)
Half-middleweight (−81 kg)	Loïc Pietri (FRA)	Sergiu Toma (UAE)	Saeid Mollaei (IRI)
Middleweight (−90 kg)	Noël van 't End (NED)	Aleksandar Kukolj (SRB)	Sherali Juraev (UZB)
Middleweight (−90 kg)	Noël van 't End (NED)	Aleksandar Kukolj (SRB)	Islam Bozbayev (KAZ)
Half-heavyweight (−100 kg)	Elmar Gasimov (AZE)	Karl-Richard Frey (GER)	Arsen Omarov (RUS)
Half-heavyweight (−100 kg)	Elmar Gasimov (AZE)	Karl-Richard Frey (GER)	Dimitri Peters (GER)
Heavyweight (+100 kg)	Faïcel Jaballah (TUN)	Rafael Silva (BRA)	Barna Bor (HUN)
Heavyweight (+100 kg)	Faïcel Jaballah (TUN)	Rafael Silva (BRA)	Iurii Krakovetskii (KGZ)

=== Women's events ===
Event	Gold	Silver	Bronze
Extra-lightweight (−48 kg)	Paula Pareto (ARG)	Nathalia Brigida (BRA)	Dilara Lokmanhekim (TUR)
Extra-lightweight (−48 kg)	Paula Pareto (ARG)	Nathalia Brigida (BRA)	Taciana Lima (GBS)
Half-lightweight (−52 kg)	Distria Krasniqi (KOS)	Ilse Heylen (BEL)	Lisa Kearney (IRL)
Half-lightweight (−52 kg)	Distria Krasniqi (KOS)	Ilse Heylen (BEL)	Agata Perenc (POL)
Lightweight (−57 kg)	Viola Wächter (GER)	Sanne Verhagen (NED)	Nekoda Smythe-Davis (GBR)
Lightweight (−57 kg)	Viola Wächter (GER)	Sanne Verhagen (NED)	Corina Căprioriu (ROU)
Half-middleweight (−63 kg)	Anicka van Emden (NED)	Hilde Drexler (AUT)	Juul Franssen (NED)
Half-middleweight (−63 kg)	Anicka van Emden (NED)	Hilde Drexler (AUT)	Alice Schlesinger (GBR)
Middleweight (−70 kg)	Linda Bolder (ISR)	Yuri Alvear (COL)	Sally Conway (GBR)
Middleweight (−70 kg)	Linda Bolder (ISR)	Yuri Alvear (COL)	Naranjargal Tsend-Ayush (MGL)
Half-heavyweight (−78 kg)	Madeleine Malonga (FRA)	Natalie Powell (GBR)	Luise Malzahn (GER)
Half-heavyweight (−78 kg)	Madeleine Malonga (FRA)	Natalie Powell (GBR)	Viktoriya Turks (UKR)
Heavyweight (+78 kg)	Ma Sisi (CHN)	Nihel Cheikh Rouhou (TUN)	Jasmin Grabowski (GER)
Heavyweight (+78 kg)	Ma Sisi (CHN)	Nihel Cheikh Rouhou (TUN)	Kim Ji-youn (KOR)

Source Results

=== Medal table ===
* Host nation (Turkey)

Rank	Nation	Gold	Silver	Bronze	Total
1	Netherlands (NED)	2	1	2	5
2	Azerbaijan (AZE)	2	1	0	3
3	Uzbekistan (UZB)	2	0	1	3
4	France (FRA)	2	0	0	2
5	Germany (GER)	1	1	3	5
6	Tunisia (TUN)	1	1	0	2
7	Argentina (ARG)	1	0	0	1
7	China (CHN)	1	0	0	1
7	Israel (ISR)	1	0	0	1
7	Kosovo (KOS)	1	0	0	1
11	Brazil (BRA)	0	2	0	2
12	Great Britain (GBR)	0	1	3	4
13	Mongolia (MGL)	0	1	2	3
14	Turkey (TUR)*	0	1	1	2
14	United Arab Emirates (UAE)	0	1	1	2
16	Austria (AUT)	0	1	0	1
16	Belgium (BEL)	0	1	0	1
16	Colombia (COL)	0	1	0	1
16	Serbia (SRB)	0	1	0	1
20	Georgia (GEO)	0	0	2	2
20	Russia (RUS)	0	0	2	2
22	Guinea-Bissau (GBS)	0	0	1	1
22	Hungary (HUN)	0	0	1	1
22	Iran (IRI)	0	0	1	1
22	Ireland (IRL)	0	0	1	1
22	Kazakhstan (KAZ)	0	0	1	1
22	Kyrgyzstan (KGZ)	0	0	1	1
22	Poland (POL)	0	0	1	1
22	Portugal (POR)	0	0	1	1
22	Romania (ROU)	0	0	1	1
22	South Korea (KOR)	0	0	1	1
22	Ukraine (UKR)	0	0	1	1
Totals (32 entries)		14	14	28	56
