= Hiromi Endō =

Japanese judoka (born 1993)

Personal information
- Nationality: Japanese
- Born: 22 February 1993 (age 33)
- Occupation: Judoka

Sport
- Country: Japan
- Sport: Judo
- Weight class: ‍–‍48 kg

Achievements and titles
- Asian Champ.: (gold) (2011, 2013)
Medal record
Women's judo
Representing Japan
Asian Championships
Gold medal – first place	2011 Abu Dhabi	‍–‍48 kg
Gold medal – first place	2013 Bangkok	‍–‍48 kg
World Masters
Gold medal – first place	2013 Tyumen	‍–‍48 kg
IJF Grand Slam
Gold medal – first place	2018 Ekaterinburg	‍–‍48 kg
Bronze medal – third place	2018 Osaka	‍–‍48 kg
IJF Grand Prix
Gold medal – first place	2016 Budapest	‍–‍48 kg
Gold medal – first place	2017 Zagreb	‍–‍48 kg
Gold medal – first place	2018 Budapest	‍–‍48 kg
Silver medal – second place	2012 Düsseldorf	‍–‍48 kg
World Juniors Championships
Gold medal – first place	2011 Cape Town	‍–‍48 kg
Silver medal – second place	2009 Paris	‍–‍48 kg
World Cadets Championships
Gold medal – first place	2009 Budapest	‍–‍48 kg

Profile at external databases
- IJF: 3273
- JudoInside.com: 50092
- Updated on 20 November 2022

Hiromi Endō (born 22 February 1993) is a Japanese judoka.

Endō is the gold medalist of the 2013 Judo World Masters in the ‍–‍48 kg category.
