= Kim Sung-min (judoka) =

South Korean judoka (born 1987)

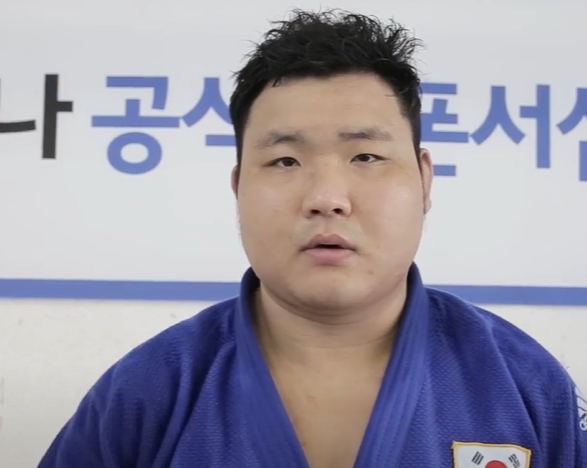

Personal information
- Born: 29 June 1987 (age 39)
- Occupation: Judoka

Sport
- Country: South Korea
- Sport: Judo
- Weight class: +100 kg

Achievements and titles
- Olympic Games: 5th (2012)
- World Champ.: (bronze) (2011)
- Asian Champ.: (gold) (2008, 2017, 2018, 2019)
Medal record
Men's judo
Representing South Korea
World Championships
| Bronze medal – third place | 2011 Paris | +100 kg |
Asian Games
| Gold medal – first place | 2014 Incheon | Men's team |
| Gold medal – first place | 2018 Jakarta | +100 kg |
| Bronze medal – third place | 2014 Incheon | +100 kg |
Asian Championships
| Gold medal – first place | 2008 Jeju | Open |
| Gold medal – first place | 2017 Hong Kong | +100 kg |
| Gold medal – first place | 2019 Fujairah | +100 kg |
| Silver medal – second place | 2011 Abu Dhabi | +100 kg |
| Bronze medal – third place | 2012 Tashkent | +100 kg |
| Bronze medal – third place | 2021 Bishkek | +100 kg |
IJF Grand Slam
| Gold medal – first place | 2010 Tokyo | +100 kg |
| Gold medal – first place | 2012 Tokyo | +100 kg |
| Gold medal – first place | 2013 Tokyo | +100 kg |
| Gold medal – first place | 2015 Abu Dhabi | +100 kg |
| Gold medal – first place | 2019 Paris | +100 kg |
| Silver medal – second place | 2013 Paris | +100 kg |
| Silver medal – second place | 2018 Paris | +100 kg |
| Silver medal – second place | 2021 Tashkent | +100 kg |
| Bronze medal – third place | 2010 Paris | +100 kg |
| Bronze medal – third place | 2011 Paris | +100 kg |
| Bronze medal – third place | 2012 Paris | +100 kg |
| Bronze medal – third place | 2019 Abu Dhabi | +100 kg |
IJF Grand Prix
| Gold medal – first place | 2011 Abu Dhabi | +100 kg |
| Gold medal – first place | 2013 Jeju | +100 kg |
| Silver medal – second place | 2011 Qingdao | +100 kg |
| Silver medal – second place | 2014 Jeju | +100 kg |
| Silver medal – second place | 2015 Qingdao | +100 kg |
| Silver medal – second place | 2015 Jeju | +100 kg |
| Silver medal – second place | 2020 Tel Aviv | +100 kg |
| Bronze medal – third place | 2016 Düsseldorf | +100 kg |
| Bronze medal – third place | 2017 Hohhot | +100 kg |
| Bronze medal – third place | 2018 Antalya | +100 kg |
Asian Junior Championships
| Gold medal – first place | 2006 Jeju | +100 kg |
Summer Universiade
| Gold medal – first place | 2009 Belgrade | Open |
| Gold medal – first place | 2011 Shenzhen | Open |
| Silver medal – second place | 2013 Kazan | Men's team |
| Bronze medal – third place | 2011 Shenzhen | Men's team |
| Bronze medal – third place | 2013 Kazan | Open |

Profile at external databases
- IJF: 1982
- JudoInside.com: 42959
- Updated on 21 May 2023

Kim Sung-Min (born 29 June 1987) is a South Korean judoka.

== Career ==
Kim graduated from Yong In University. At the 2008 Asian Judo Championships, his first international adult competition, he won a gold medal. He went on to win a bronze medal in the 2011 World Judo Championships.

At the 2012 Summer Olympics, Kim reached the semi-finals where he lost to eventual champion Teddy Riner. He then lost his bronze medal match to Rafael Silva.

At the 2016 Summer Olympics, Kim was knocked out in the second round to Roy Meyer.
