= Hwang Ye-sul =

South Korean judoka (born 1987)

Personal information
- Born: 2 November 1987 (age 38) Gyeonggi, South Korea
- Occupation: Judoka

Sport
- Country: South Korea
- Sport: Judo
- Weight class: ‍–‍70 kg

Achievements and titles
- Olympic Games: 5th (2012)
- World Champ.: 5th (2013)
- Asian Champ.: (gold) (2010, 2011, 2012, 2013)
Medal record
Women's judo
Representing South Korea
Asian Games
Gold medal – first place	2010 Guangzhou	‍–‍70 kg
Asian Championships
Gold medal – first place	2011 Abu Dhabi	‍–‍70 kg
Gold medal – first place	2012 Tashkent	‍–‍70 kg
Gold medal – first place	2013 Bangkok	‍–‍70 kg
Bronze medal – third place	2009 Taipei	‍–‍70 kg
World Masters
Gold medal – first place	2010 Suwon	‍–‍70 kg
Silver medal – second place	2011 Baku	‍–‍70 kg
IJF Grand Slam
Bronze medal – third place	2010 Paris	‍–‍70 kg
Bronze medal – third place	2010 Moscow	‍–‍70 kg
Bronze medal – third place	2010 Tokyo	‍–‍70 kg
Bronze medal – third place	2012 Paris	‍–‍70 kg
Bronze medal – third place	2012 Tokyo	‍–‍70 kg
IJF Grand Prix
Gold medal – first place	2013 Jeju	‍–‍70 kg
Silver medal – second place	2014 Ulaanbaatar	‍–‍70 kg
Silver medal – second place	2016 Qingdao	‍–‍70 kg
Bronze medal – third place	2014 Düsseldorf	‍–‍70 kg
Summer Universiade
Gold medal – first place	2013 Kazan	‍–‍70 kg
Gold medal – first place	2013 Kazan	Women's team
Bronze medal – third place	2009 Belgrade	‍–‍70 kg

Profile at external databases
- IJF: 1983
- JudoInside.com: 54191
- Updated on 20 November 2022

Hwang Ye-Sul (Korean: 황예슬; born 2 November 1987 in Gyeonggi) is a South Korean judoka. She competed in the 70 kg event in judo at the 2012 Summer Olympics, where she reached the semifinals. However, Ye-Sul lost to Lucie Décosse and lost the bronze medal match to Edith Bosch.
