= Yuya Yoshida =

Japanese judoka (born 1989)

Personal information
- Born: 28 April 1989 (age 37)
- Occupation: Judoka
- Height: 171 cm (5 ft 7 in)

Sport
- Country: Japan
- Sport: Judo
- Weight class: ‍–‍90 kg
- Rank: 5th dan black belt
- Coached by: Kosei Inoue

Achievements and titles
- Asian Champ.: (gold) (2014)
Medal record
Men's judo
Representing Japan
Asian Games
Gold medal – first place	2014 Incheon	‍–‍90 kg
Bronze medal – third place	2014 Incheon	Men's team
Asian Championships
Bronze medal – third place	2012 Tashkent	‍–‍90 kg
World Masters
Silver medal – second place	2015 Rabat	‍–‍90 kg
IJF Grand Slam
Gold medal – first place	2014 Tyumen	‍–‍90 kg
Bronze medal – third place	2009 Tokyo	‍–‍90 kg
IJF Grand Prix
Gold medal – first place	2010 Düsseldorf	‍–‍90 kg
Gold medal – first place	2010 Rotterdam	‍–‍90 kg
Silver medal – second place	2009 Hamburg	‍–‍90 kg
Silver medal – second place	2009 Abu Dhabi	‍–‍90 kg
Asian Junior Championships
Gold medal – first place	2008 Sana'a	‍–‍90 kg

Profile at external databases
- IJF: 1786, 11101
- JudoInside.com: 37694
- Updated on 20 November 2022

Yuya Yoshida (吉田 優也, Yoshida Yūya; born on 28 April 1989) is a Japanese judoka. He won the gold medal in the 90 kg weight class at the 2014 Asian Games.
