= Choi Gwang-hyeon =

South Korean judoka (born 1986)

Personal information
- Born: 16 April 1986 (age 40); Gangwon-do, South Korea
- Occupation: Judoka

Korean name
- Hangul: 최광현
- RR: Choe Gwanghyeon
- MR: Ch'oe Kwanghyŏn

Sport
- Country: South Korea
- Sport: Judo
- Weight class: ‍–‍60 kg, ‍–‍66 kg

Achievements and titles
- Olympic Games: 7th (2012)
- World Champ.: 5th (2011)
- Asian Champ.: (gold) (2011, 2012, 2014)
Medal record
Men's judo
Representing South Korea
Asian Games
Gold medal – first place	2014 Incheon	Men's team
Asian Championships
Gold medal – first place	2011 Abu Dhabi	‍–‍60 kg
Gold medal – first place	2012 Tashkent	‍–‍60 kg
Bronze medal – third place	2009 Taipei	‍–‍60 kg
World Masters
Bronze medal – third place	2010 Suwon	‍–‍60 kg
IJF Grand Slam
Silver medal – second place	2008 Tokyo	‍–‍60 kg
Bronze medal – third place	2009 Paris	‍–‍60 kg
IJF Grand Prix
Bronze medal – third place	2010 Düsseldorf	‍–‍60 kg
Bronze medal – third place	2013 Rijeka	‍–‍66 kg

Profile at external databases
- IJF: 2164
- JudoInside.com: 54545
- Updated on 20 November 2022

Choi Gwang-hyeon (born 16 April 1986 in Gangwon-do, South Korea) is a South Korean judoka who competes in the men's 60 kg category. He won gold twice in the Asian Judo Championships. At the 2012 Summer Olympics, he was defeated in the quarter finals.
