= Tomofumi Takajo =

Japanese judoka (born 1991)

Personal information
- Born: 7 December 1991 (age 34)
- Occupation: Judoka

Sport
- Country: Japan
- Sport: Judo
- Weight class: ‍–‍66 kg

Achievements and titles
- Asian Champ.: (gold) (2015)
Medal record
Men's judo
Representing Japan
Asian Games
Silver medal – second place	2014 Incheon	‍–‍66 kg
Bronze medal – third place	2014 Incheon	Men's team
Asian Championships
Gold medal – first place	2015 Kuwait City	‍–‍66 kg
Bronze medal – third place	2012 Tashkent	‍–‍66 kg
World Masters
Silver medal – second place	2013 Tyumen	‍–‍66 kg
IJF Grand Slam
Gold medal – first place	2011 Tokyo	‍–‍66 kg
Gold medal – first place	2013 Tokyo	‍–‍66 kg
Gold medal – first place	2015 Tyumen	‍–‍66 kg
Gold medal – first place	2015 Tokyo	‍–‍66 kg
Silver medal – second place	2012 Moscow	‍–‍66 kg
Silver medal – second place	2017 Baku	‍–‍66 kg
Bronze medal – third place	2012 Tokyo	‍–‍66 kg
Bronze medal – third place	2013 Paris	‍–‍66 kg
Bronze medal – third place	2015 Paris	‍–‍66 kg
IJF Grand Prix
Gold medal – first place	2014 Ulaanbaatar	‍–‍66 kg
Summer Universiade
Gold medal – first place	2013 Kazan	‍–‍66 kg
Gold medal – first place	2013 Kazan	Men's team

Profile at external databases
- IJF: 6624
- JudoInside.com: 70359
- Updated on 20 November 2022

Tomofumi Takajo (born 7 December 1991) is a Japanese judoka.

Takajo is the silver medalist of the 2017 Judo Grand Slam Baku in the ‍–‍66 kg category.
