= 2012 Asian Judo Championships =

Judo competition

- Host city: Tashkent, Uzbekistan
- Dates: 27–29 April

The 2012 Asian Judo Championships were the 19th edition of the Asian Judo Championships, and were held in Tashkent, Uzbekistan from April 27 to April 29, 2012.

== Medal summary ==
=== Men ===
Event	Gold	Silver	Bronze
Extra lightweight −60 kg	Choi Gwang-hyeon; South Korea	Hirofumi Yamamoto; Japan	A Lamusi; China
Extra lightweight −60 kg	Choi Gwang-hyeon; South Korea	Hirofumi Yamamoto; Japan	Tsai Ming-yen; Chinese Taipei
Half lightweight −66 kg	Sergey Lim; Kazakhstan	Choi Min-ho; South Korea	Tomofumi Takajo; Japan
Half lightweight −66 kg	Sergey Lim; Kazakhstan	Choi Min-ho; South Korea	Sanjaasürengiin Miyaaragchaa; Mongolia
Lightweight −73 kg	Wang Ki-chun; South Korea	Shohei Ono; Japan	Navruz Jurakobilov; Uzbekistan
Lightweight −73 kg	Wang Ki-chun; South Korea	Shohei Ono; Japan	Rasul Boqiev; Tajikistan
Half middleweight −81 kg	Kim Jae-bum; South Korea	Keita Nagashima; Japan	Amir Ghaseminejad; Iran
Half middleweight −81 kg	Kim Jae-bum; South Korea	Keita Nagashima; Japan	Yakhyo Imamov; Uzbekistan
Middleweight −90 kg	Dilshod Choriev; Uzbekistan	Parviz Sobirov; Tajikistan	Yuya Yoshida; Japan
Middleweight −90 kg	Dilshod Choriev; Uzbekistan	Parviz Sobirov; Tajikistan	Chingiz Mamedov; Kyrgyzstan
Half heavyweight −100 kg	Ramziddin Sayidov; Uzbekistan	Javad Mahjoub; Iran	Viktor Demyanenko; Kazakhstan
Half heavyweight −100 kg	Ramziddin Sayidov; Uzbekistan	Javad Mahjoub; Iran	Battulgyn Temüülen; Mongolia
Heavyweight +100 kg	Mohammad Reza Roudaki; Iran	Takeshi Ojitani; Japan	Kim Sung-min; South Korea
Heavyweight +100 kg	Mohammad Reza Roudaki; Iran	Takeshi Ojitani; Japan	Namsraijavyn Batsuuri; Mongolia
Team	South Korea	Japan	Uzbekistan
Team	South Korea	Japan	Kazakhstan

=== Women ===
Event	Gold	Silver	Bronze
Extra lightweight −48 kg	Mönkhbatyn Urantsetseg; Mongolia	Wu Shugen; China	Chung Jung-yeon; South Korea
Extra lightweight −48 kg	Mönkhbatyn Urantsetseg; Mongolia	Wu Shugen; China	Shoko Ibe; Japan
Half lightweight −52 kg	Yuka Nishida; Japan	Mönkhbaataryn Bundmaa; Mongolia	He Hongmei; China
Half lightweight −52 kg	Yuka Nishida; Japan	Mönkhbaataryn Bundmaa; Mongolia	Kim Mi-ri; South Korea
Lightweight −57 kg	Anzu Yamamoto; Japan	Lien Chen-ling; Chinese Taipei	Dorjsürengiin Sumiyaa; Mongolia
Lightweight −57 kg	Anzu Yamamoto; Japan	Lien Chen-ling; Chinese Taipei	Kim Jan-di; South Korea
Half middleweight −63 kg	Yoshie Ueno; Japan	Tsedevsürengiin Mönkhzayaa; Mongolia	Joung Da-woon; South Korea
Half middleweight −63 kg	Yoshie Ueno; Japan	Tsedevsürengiin Mönkhzayaa; Mongolia	Xu Yuhua; China
Middleweight −70 kg	Hwang Ye-sul; South Korea	Tomoe Ueno; Japan	Tsend-Ayuushiin Naranjargal; Mongolia
Middleweight −70 kg	Hwang Ye-sul; South Korea	Tomoe Ueno; Japan	Sol Kyong; North Korea
Half heavyweight −78 kg	Pürevjargalyn Lkhamdegd; Mongolia	Zhang Zhehui; China	Jeong Gyeong-mi; South Korea
Half heavyweight −78 kg	Pürevjargalyn Lkhamdegd; Mongolia	Zhang Zhehui; China	Tomomi Okamura; Japan
Heavyweight +78 kg	Qin Qian; China	Gulzhan Issanova; Kazakhstan	Kim Na-young; South Korea
Heavyweight +78 kg	Qin Qian; China	Gulzhan Issanova; Kazakhstan	Nanami Hashiguchi; Japan
Team	Japan	Mongolia	South Korea
Team	Japan	Mongolia	Chinese Taipei

== Medal table ==
Rank	Nation	Gold	Silver	Bronze	Total
1	South Korea	5	1	8	14
2	Japan	4	6	5	15
3	Mongolia	2	3	5	10
4	Uzbekistan	2	0	3	5
5	China	1	2	3	6
6	Kazakhstan	1	1	2	4
7	Iran	1	1	1	3
8	Chinese Taipei	0	1	2	3
9	Tajikistan	0	1	1	2
10	Kyrgyzstan	0	0	1	1
10	North Korea	0	0	1	1
Totals (11 entries)		16	16	32	64

== Participating nations ==
185 athletes from 26 nations competed.

- Afghanistan (7)
- China (14)
- Chinese Taipei (11)
- Hong Kong (2)
- India (4)
- Indonesia (1)
- Iran (10)
- Japan (14)
- Kazakhstan (14)
- Kyrgyzstan (14)
- Lebanon (5)
- Mongolia (14)
- Nepal (2)
- North Korea (4)
- Pakistan (3)
- Philippines (3)
- Qatar (4)
- Saudi Arabia (3)
- South Korea (14)
- Syria (3)
- Tajikistan (7)
- Turkmenistan (11)
- United Arab Emirates (1)
- Uzbekistan (14)
- Vietnam (4)
- Yemen (2)
