= Kim Jae-bum =

South Korean judoka (born 1985)

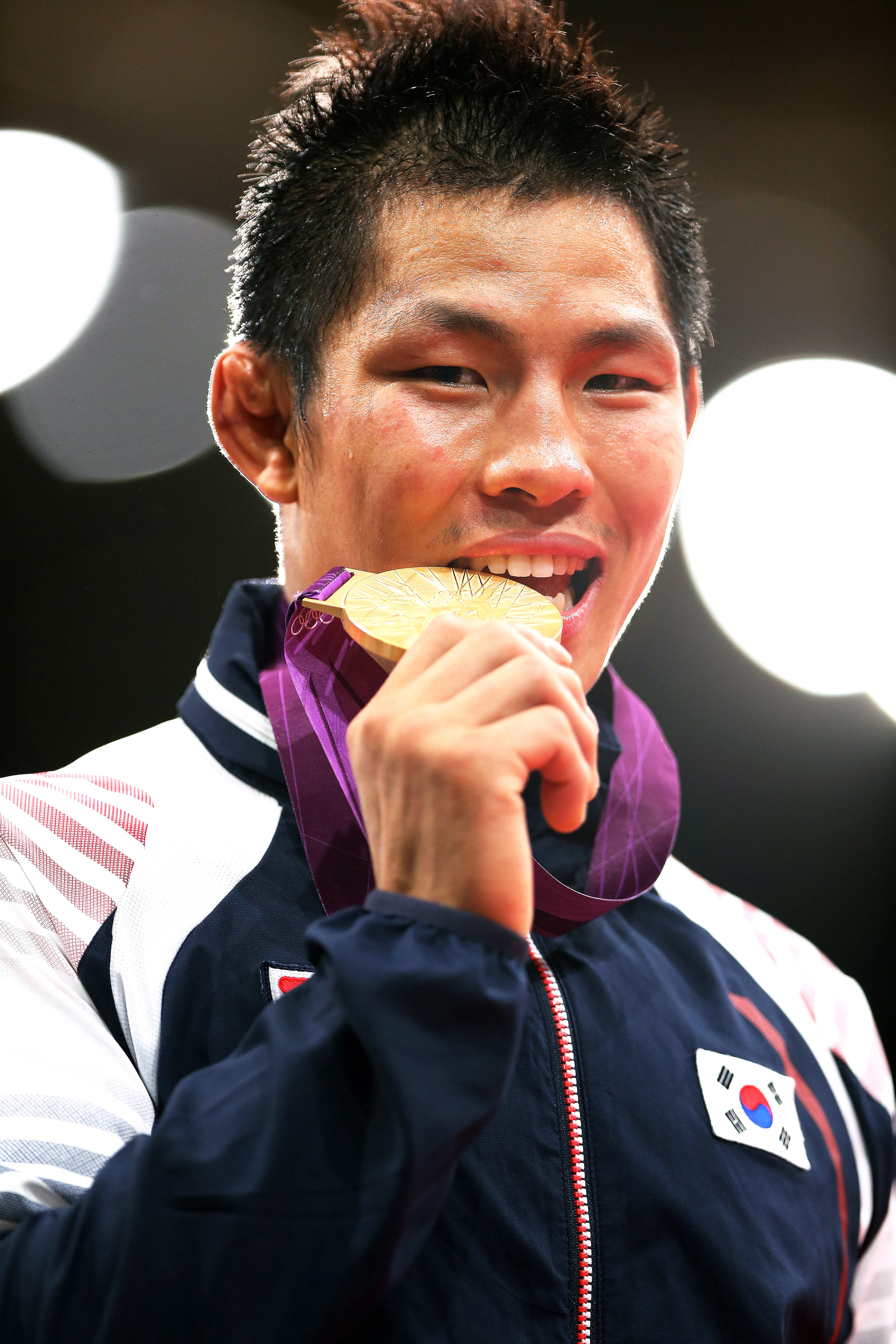

Personal information
- Born: 25 January 1985 (age 41) Gimcheon, Gyeongsangbuk-do, South Korea
- Home town: Seoul, South Korea
- Education: Yongin University
- Occupation: Judoka
- Height: 182 cm (6 ft 0 in)

Sport
- Country: South Korea
- Sport: Judo
- Weight class: –81 kg
- Rank: 5th dan black belt
- Coached by: Chung Hoon

Korean name
- Hangul: 김재범
- Hanja: 金宰範
- RR: Gim Jaebeom
- MR: Kim Chaebŏm

Achievements and titles
- Olympic Games: (gold) (2012)
- World Champ.: (gold) (2010, 2011)
- Asian Champ.: (gold) (2005, 2008, 2009, 2010, 2011, 2012, 2014)
- Highest world ranking: 1st (2010, 2011, 2012, 2013)
Medal record
Men's judo
Representing South Korea
Olympic Games
Gold medal – first place	2012 London	‍–‍81 kg
Silver medal – second place	2008 Beijing	‍–‍81 kg
World Championships
Gold medal – first place	2010 Tokyo	‍–‍81 kg
Gold medal – first place	2011 Paris	‍–‍81 kg
Bronze medal – third place	2009 Rotterdam	‍–‍81 kg
Asian Games
Gold medal – first place	2010 Guangzhou	‍–‍81 kg
Gold medal – first place	2014 Incheon	‍–‍81 kg
Gold medal – first place	2014 Incheon	Men's team
Asian Championships
Gold medal – first place	2005 Tashkent	‍–‍73 kg
Gold medal – first place	2008 Jeju	‍–‍81 kg
Gold medal – first place	2009 Taipei	‍–‍81 kg
Gold medal – first place	2011 Abu Dhabi	‍–‍81 kg
Gold medal – first place	2012 Tashkent	‍–‍81 kg
Silver medal – second place	2015 Kuwait City	‍–‍81 kg
World Masters
Gold medal – first place	2010 Suwon	‍–‍81 kg
IJF Grand Slam
Gold medal – first place	2011 Paris	‍–‍81 kg
Gold medal – first place	2012 Tokyo	‍–‍81 kg
Silver medal – second place	2009 Paris	‍–‍81 kg
Silver medal – second place	2009 Tokyo	‍–‍81 kg
Bronze medal – third place	2014 Paris	‍–‍81 kg
IJF Grand Prix
Gold medal – first place	2010 Düsseldorf	‍–‍81 kg
Gold medal – first place	2013 Jeju	‍–‍81 kg
Gold medal – first place	2014 Jeju	‍–‍81 kg
Bronze medal – third place	2013 Düsseldorf	‍–‍81 kg
World Juniors Championships
Gold medal – first place	2004 Budapest	‍–‍73 kg
Asian Junior Championships
Gold medal – first place	2003 Macau	‍–‍66 kg
Summer Universiade
Silver medal – second place	2007 Bangkok	‍–‍73 kg

Profile at external databases
- IJF: 64
- JudoInside.com: 34929
- Updated on 25 May 2023

Kim Jae-bum (김재범) (Korean pronunciation: [kim.dʑɛ̝.bʌm]; born 25 January 1985, in Gimcheon, Gyeongsangbuk-do) is a retired South Korean judoka. Despite being plagued with injuries throughout his career, Kim is known for dominating major competitions at the half-middleweight category (81 kg)—particularly between his Olympic debut in 2008 and his 2012 Olympic finals rematch against Ole Bischof.

Kim has had several nicknames, including "Man of One Arm Wins" for his successes through injury, "Korean Tiger" for his aggressive play and iconic status in South Korean judo, and "Energizer Bunny" for his quick and relentless style of judo.

He was granted exemption from South Korea's mandatory military service in 2010, following his gold medal victory at the Guangzhou Asian Games.

== Judo career ==
Kim won a gold medal in the -73 kg class at the 2004 World Junior Judo Championships in Budapest, Hungary.

At the 2005 Asian Judo Championships in Tashkent, he won a gold medal in the -73 kg class.

Kim was considered one of the Big Three Judokas of the -73 kg class in South Korea, along with Lee Won-hee and Wang Ki-chun. But in 2007, he moved up in weight to avoid the fierce competition, and won a gold medal in the -81 kg category at the 2008 Asian Judo Championships in Jeju.

At the 2008 Beijing Summer Olympics, Kim won the silver medal in the -81 kg class. In the preliminary rounds, he defeated 2006 European champion Serguei Shundikov of Belarus by points, and 2007 European champion Robert Krawczyk of Poland by ippon. Kim edged out 2008 European champion João Neto of Portugal by points in the quarterfinals. In the semifinal, Kim beat 2005 World Champion Guillaume Elmont of the Netherlands. Despite defeating all of the European champions from 2006 to 2008 in the previous rounds, Kim lost in the final round to the 2005 European champion, Ole Bischof of Germany.

Kim won his first major gold medal at the 2010 World Judo Championships held in Tokyo, Japan. In the gold medal match, he defeated two-time Olympic medalist Leandro Guilheiro of Brazil by scoring a waza-ari with ouchi-gari in extra time.

Kim proceeded to become a two-time world champion at the 2011 World Judo Championships held in Paris, France. During the Round of 16, Kim avenged his 2008 Beijing Olympic Games finals loss to Ole Bischof. Kim went on to win gold by defeating Srdjan Mrvaljevic of Montenegro with a waza-ari by osaekomi.

In the 2012 London Summer Olympics, Kim won the gold medal in men's -81 kg division, defeating German rival, Ole Bischof.

He announced his retirement on 1 May 2016.

== Achievements ==
Year	Tournament	Place	Weight class
2014	2014 Incheon Asian Games	1st	Half middleweight (–81 kg)
2012	2012 London Summer Olympics	1st	Half middleweight (–81 kg)
2011	2011 Paris World Judo Championships	1st	Half middleweight (–81 kg)
2010	2010 Guangzhou Asian Games	1st	Half middleweight (–81 kg)
2010	2010 Tokyo World Judo Championships	1st	Half middleweight (–81 kg)
2010	2010 Suwon World Masters Tournament	1st	Half middleweight (–81 kg)
2009	2009 Rotterdam World Judo Championships	3rd	Half middleweight (–81 kg)
2008	2008 Beijing Summer Olympics	2nd	Half middleweight (–81 kg)
2004	2004 Budapest World Judo Championships — Juniors	1st	Lightweight (–73 kg)

== Competitive record ==
Judo Record
Total	123
Wins	110
by Ippon	43
Losses	13
by Ippon	8

(as of 30 October 2015)
