= Kim Jan-di (judoka) =

South Korean Olympic judoka

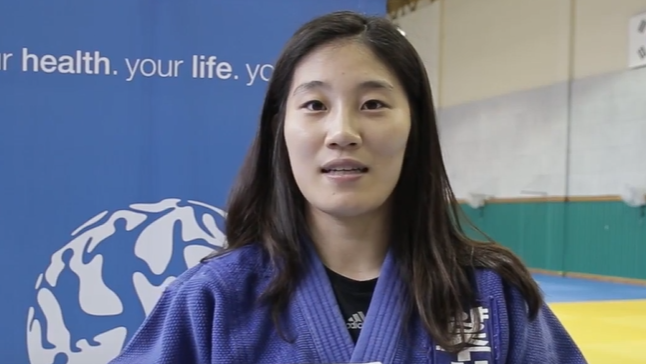

Personal information
- Born: 15 June 1991 (age 35)
- Occupation: Judoka

Sport
- Country: South Korea
- Sport: Judo
- Weight class: ‍–‍57 kg
- Coached by: Lee Won-hee

Achievements and titles
- Olympic Games: R16 (2012, 2016)
- World Champ.: R16 (2015, 2021)
- Asian Champ.: (silver) (2010, 2011, 2013, 2014, 2016)
Medal record
Women's judo
Representing South Korea
Asian Games
Silver medal – second place	2010 Guangzhou	‍–‍57 kg
Silver medal – second place	2014 Incheon	‍–‍57 kg
Silver medal – second place	2014 Incheon	Women's team
Asian Championships
Silver medal – second place	2011 Abu Dhabi	‍–‍57 kg
Silver medal – second place	2013 Bangkok	‍–‍57 kg
Silver medal – second place	2016 Tashkent	‍–‍57 kg
Bronze medal – third place	2012 Tashkent	‍–‍57 kg
Bronze medal – third place	2015 Kuwait City	‍–‍57 kg
World Masters
Bronze medal – third place	2011 Baku	‍–‍57 kg
Bronze medal – third place	2016 Guadalajara	‍–‍57 kg
IJF Grand Slam
Gold medal – first place	2015 Abu Dhabi	‍–‍57 kg
Gold medal – first place	2016 Paris	‍–‍57 kg
Bronze medal – third place	2019 Abu Dhabi	‍–‍57 kg
IJF Grand Prix
Gold medal – first place	2011 Qingdao	‍–‍57 kg
Gold medal – first place	2015 Tashkent	‍–‍57 kg
Gold medal – first place	2015 Jeju	‍–‍57 kg
Silver medal – second place	2013 Ulaanbaatar	‍–‍57 kg
Silver medal – second place	2018 Antalya	‍–‍57 kg
Bronze medal – third place	2013 Düsseldorf	‍–‍57 kg
Bronze medal – third place	2019 Tashkent	‍–‍57 kg
Summer Universiade
Silver medal – second place	2011 Shenzhen	‍–‍57 kg
Bronze medal – third place	2015 Gwangju	‍–‍57 kg

Profile at external databases
- IJF: 1139
- JudoInside.com: 57792
- Updated on 20 November 2022

Kim Jan-Di (Korean: 김잔디; born June 15, 1991 in South Jeolla, South Korea) is a South Korean judoka. She competed in the 57 kg event at the 2012 Summer Olympics and lost in the second round. She lost in the first round of the same event at the 2016 Summer Olympics. That year, she won a silver medal at the Asian Championships. She was ranked 3rd in the world for part of 2016.

Kim's other medals include silvers at the 2011 and 2013 Asian Championships, the 2010 and 2014 Asian Games and bronzes at the 2012 and 2015 Asian Championships.

== Competitive record ==
Judo Record
Total	204
Wins	130
by Ippon	57
Losses	74
by Ippon	35

(as of 16 May 2024)

Her last competition was at the World Judo Championships Seniors Teams in Hungary in June 2021.
