= 2011 Asian Judo Championships =

Judo competition

The 2011 Asian Judo Championships were held at UAE WJJ Federation Hall in Abu Dhabi, United Arab Emirates from 5 April to 7 April 2011.

== Medal summary ==
=== Men ===
| Event | Gold | Silver | Bronze |
|---|---|---|---|
| Extra lightweight −60 kg | Choi Gwang-hyeon; South Korea | Davaadorjiin Tömörkhüleg; Mongolia | Gabit Esimbetov; Uzbekistan |
| Extra lightweight −60 kg | Choi Gwang-hyeon; South Korea | Davaadorjiin Tömörkhüleg; Mongolia | Yerkebulan Kossayev; Kazakhstan |
| Half lightweight −66 kg | Junpei Morishita; Japan | Khashbaataryn Tsagaanbaatar; Mongolia | Cho Jun-ho; South Korea |
| Half lightweight −66 kg | Junpei Morishita; Japan | Khashbaataryn Tsagaanbaatar; Mongolia | Mirzohid Farmonov; Uzbekistan |
| Lightweight −73 kg | Wang Ki-chun; South Korea | Riki Nakaya; Japan | Kim Chol-su; North Korea |
| Lightweight −73 kg | Wang Ki-chun; South Korea | Riki Nakaya; Japan | Ali Maloumat; Iran |
| Half middleweight −81 kg | Kim Jae-bum; South Korea | Islam Bozbayev; Kazakhstan | Amir Ghaseminejad; Iran |
| Half middleweight −81 kg | Kim Jae-bum; South Korea | Islam Bozbayev; Kazakhstan | Si Rijigawa; China |
| Middleweight −90 kg | Lee Kyu-won; South Korea | Daiki Nishiyama; Japan | Timur Bolat; Kazakhstan |
| Middleweight −90 kg | Lee Kyu-won; South Korea | Daiki Nishiyama; Japan | Dilshod Choriev; Uzbekistan |
| Half heavyweight −100 kg | Ramziddin Sayidov; Uzbekistan | Hwang Hee-tae; South Korea | Daisuke Kobayashi; Japan |
| Half heavyweight −100 kg | Ramziddin Sayidov; Uzbekistan | Hwang Hee-tae; South Korea | Naidangiin Tüvshinbayar; Mongolia |
| Heavyweight +100 kg | Abdullo Tangriev; Uzbekistan | Kim Sung-min; South Korea | Ryuta Ishii; Japan |
| Heavyweight +100 kg | Abdullo Tangriev; Uzbekistan | Kim Sung-min; South Korea | Yerzhan Shynkeyev; Kazakhstan |
| Team | South Korea | Japan | Uzbekistan |
| Team | South Korea | Japan | Kazakhstan |

=== Women ===
| Event | Gold | Silver | Bronze |
|---|---|---|---|
| Extra lightweight −48 kg | Hiromi Endō; Japan | Xie Shishi; China | Hwang Ryu-ok; North Korea |
| Extra lightweight −48 kg | Hiromi Endō; Japan | Xie Shishi; China | Văn Ngọc Tú; Vietnam |
| Half lightweight −52 kg | Yuka Nishida; Japan | Mönkhbaataryn Bundmaa; Mongolia | Jo Song-hui; North Korea |
| Half lightweight −52 kg | Yuka Nishida; Japan | Mönkhbaataryn Bundmaa; Mongolia | Kim Kyung-ok; South Korea |
| Lightweight −57 kg | Aiko Sato; Japan | Kim Jan-di; South Korea | Lien Chen-ling; Chinese Taipei |
| Lightweight −57 kg | Aiko Sato; Japan | Kim Jan-di; South Korea | Lu Tongjuan; China |
| Half middleweight −63 kg | Xu Lili; China | Joung Da-woon; South Korea | Tsedevsürengiin Mönkhzayaa; Mongolia |
| Half middleweight −63 kg | Xu Lili; China | Joung Da-woon; South Korea | Yoshie Ueno; Japan |
| Middleweight −70 kg | Hwang Ye-sul; South Korea | Haruka Tachimoto; Japan | Chen Fei; China |
| Middleweight −70 kg | Hwang Ye-sul; South Korea | Haruka Tachimoto; Japan | Tsend-Ayuushiin Naranjargal; Mongolia |
| Half heavyweight −78 kg | Pürevjargalyn Lkhamdegd; Mongolia | Jeong Gyeong-mi; South Korea | Chihiro Takahashi; Japan |
| Half heavyweight −78 kg | Pürevjargalyn Lkhamdegd; Mongolia | Jeong Gyeong-mi; South Korea | Zhang Meiling; China |
| Heavyweight +78 kg | Megumi Tachimoto; Japan | Kim Na-young; South Korea | Dorjgotovyn Tserenkhand; Mongolia |
| Heavyweight +78 kg | Megumi Tachimoto; Japan | Kim Na-young; South Korea | Gulzhan Issanova; Kazakhstan |
| Team | Japan | Mongolia | South Korea |
| Team | Japan | Mongolia | China |

== Medal table ==
| Rank | Nation | Gold | Silver | Bronze | Total |
|---|---|---|---|---|---|
| 1 | South Korea | 6 | 6 | 3 | 15 |
| 2 | Japan | 6 | 4 | 4 | 14 |
| 3 | Uzbekistan | 2 | 0 | 4 | 6 |
| 4 | Mongolia | 1 | 4 | 4 | 9 |
| 5 | China | 1 | 1 | 5 | 7 |
| 6 | Kazakhstan | 0 | 1 | 5 | 6 |
| 7 | North Korea | 0 | 0 | 3 | 3 |
| 8 | Iran | 0 | 0 | 2 | 2 |
| 9 | Chinese Taipei | 0 | 0 | 1 | 1 |
| 9 | Vietnam | 0 | 0 | 1 | 1 |
| Totals (10 entries) | | 16 | 16 | 32 | 64 |
