= 2016 Judo Grand Prix Almaty =

Judo competition

Judo 2016 Judo Grand Prix Almaty
- Venue: Sport Palace Baluan Sholak
- Location: Almaty, Kazakhstan
- Dates: 13–15 May 2016
- Competitors: 395 from 83 nations

Competition at external databases
- Links: IJF • EJU • JudoInside

The 2016 Judo Grand Prix Almaty was held at the Sport Palace Baluan Sholak in Almaty, Kazakhstan from 13 to 15 May 2016.

== Medal summary ==
=== Men's events ===
Event	Gold	Silver	Bronze
Extra-lightweight (−60 kg)	Elios Manzi (ITA)	Rustam Ibrayev (KAZ)	Sharafuddin Lutfillaev (UZB)
Extra-lightweight (−60 kg)	Elios Manzi (ITA)	Rustam Ibrayev (KAZ)	Diyorbek Urozboev (UZB)
Half-lightweight (−66 kg)	Joshiro Maruyama (JPN)	Zhansay Smagulov (KAZ)	Kilian Le Blouch (FRA)
Half-lightweight (−66 kg)	Joshiro Maruyama (JPN)	Zhansay Smagulov (KAZ)	Yeldos Zhumakanov (KAZ)
Lightweight (−73 kg)	Lasha Shavdatuashvili (GEO)	Jaromír Ježek (CZE)	Nugzar Tatalashvili (GEO)
Lightweight (−73 kg)	Lasha Shavdatuashvili (GEO)	Jaromír Ježek (CZE)	Didar Khamza (KAZ)
Half-middleweight (−81 kg)	Iván Felipe Silva Morales (CUB)	Matteo Marconcini (ITA)	Nyamsürengiin Dagvasüren (MGL)
Half-middleweight (−81 kg)	Iván Felipe Silva Morales (CUB)	Matteo Marconcini (ITA)	Vladimir Zoloev (KGZ)
Middleweight (−90 kg)	Axel Clerget (FRA)	Cheng Xunzhao (CHN)	Mammadali Mehdiyev (AZE)
Middleweight (−90 kg)	Axel Clerget (FRA)	Cheng Xunzhao (CHN)	Mihael Žgank (SLO)
Half-heavyweight (−100 kg)	Elkhan Mammadov (AZE)	Rafael Buzacarini (BRA)	Javad Mahjoub (IRI)
Half-heavyweight (−100 kg)	Elkhan Mammadov (AZE)	Rafael Buzacarini (BRA)	Soyib Kurbonov (UZB)
Heavyweight (+100 kg)	Adam Okruashvili (GEO)	Ushangi Kokauri (AZE)	Levani Matiashvili (GEO)
Heavyweight (+100 kg)	Adam Okruashvili (GEO)	Ushangi Kokauri (AZE)	Mohamed-Amine Tayeb (ALG)

=== Women's events ===
Event	Gold	Silver	Bronze
Extra-lightweight (−48 kg)	Otgontsetseg Galbadrakh (KAZ)	Jeong Bo-kyeong (KOR)	Nathalia Brigida (BRA)
Extra-lightweight (−48 kg)	Otgontsetseg Galbadrakh (KAZ)	Jeong Bo-kyeong (KOR)	Maryna Cherniak (UKR)
Half-lightweight (−52 kg)	Evelyne Tschopp (SUI)	Gili Cohen (ISR)	Park Da-sol (KOR)
Half-lightweight (−52 kg)	Evelyne Tschopp (SUI)	Gili Cohen (ISR)	Agata Perenc (POL)
Lightweight (−57 kg)	Arleta Podolak (POL)	Jaione Equisoain (ESP)	Automne Pavia (FRA)
Lightweight (−57 kg)	Arleta Podolak (POL)	Jaione Equisoain (ESP)	Liu Yang (CHN)
Half-middleweight (−63 kg)	Margaux Pinot (FRA)	Tsend-Ayuushiin Tserennadmid (MGL)	Mia Hermansson (SWE)
Half-middleweight (−63 kg)	Margaux Pinot (FRA)	Tsend-Ayuushiin Tserennadmid (MGL)	Juul Franssen (NED)
Middleweight (−70 kg)	Marie-Ève Gahié (FRA)	Naranjargal Tsend-Ayush (MGL)	Katarzyna Kłys (POL)
Middleweight (−70 kg)	Marie-Ève Gahié (FRA)	Naranjargal Tsend-Ayush (MGL)	María Pérez (PUR)
Half-heavyweight (−78 kg)	Zhang Zhehui (CHN)	Albina Amangeldiyeva (KAZ)	Yalennis Castillo (CUB)
Half-heavyweight (−78 kg)	Zhang Zhehui (CHN)	Albina Amangeldiyeva (KAZ)	Viktoriya Turks (UKR)
Heavyweight (+78 kg)	Idalys Ortiz (CUB)	Kayra Sayit (TUR)	Melissa Mojica (PUR)
Heavyweight (+78 kg)	Idalys Ortiz (CUB)	Kayra Sayit (TUR)	Larisa Cerić (BIH)

Source Results

=== Medal table ===
* Host nation (Kazakhstan)

Rank	Nation	Gold	Silver	Bronze	Total
1	France (FRA)	3	0	2	5
2	Georgia (GEO)	2	0	2	4
3	Cuba (CUB)	2	0	1	3
4	Kazakhstan (KAZ)*	1	3	2	6
5	Azerbaijan (AZE)	1	1	1	3
5	China (CHN)	1	1	1	3
7	Italy (ITA)	1	1	0	2
8	Poland (POL)	1	0	2	3
9	Japan (JPN)	1	0	0	1
9	Switzerland (SUI)	1	0	0	1
11	Mongolia (MGL)	0	2	1	3
12	Brazil (BRA)	0	1	1	2
12	South Korea (KOR)	0	1	1	2
14	Czech Republic (CZE)	0	1	0	1
14	Israel (ISR)	0	1	0	1
14	Spain (ESP)	0	1	0	1
14	Turkey (TUR)	0	1	0	1
18	Uzbekistan (UZB)	0	0	3	3
19	Puerto Rico (PUR)	0	0	2	2
19	Ukraine (UKR)	0	0	2	2
21	Algeria (ALG)	0	0	1	1
21	Bosnia and Herzegovina (BIH)	0	0	1	1
21	Iran (IRI)	0	0	1	1
21	Kyrgyzstan (KGZ)	0	0	1	1
21	Netherlands (NED)	0	0	1	1
21	Slovenia (SLO)	0	0	1	1
21	Sweden (SWE)	0	0	1	1
Totals (27 entries)		14	14	28	56
