= Judo at the 2010 Asian Games – Women's 70 kg =

Judo competition

Women's 70 kg at the 2010 Asian Games
- Venue: Huagong Gymnasium
- Date: 14 November 2010
- Competitors: 11 from 11 nations

Medalists
gold medal	Hwang Ye-sul	South Korea
silver medal	Sol Kyong	North Korea
bronze medal	Tsend-Ayuushiin Naranjargal	Mongolia
bronze medal	Chen Fei	China

The women's 70 kilograms (middleweight) competition at the 2010 Asian Games in Guangzhou was held on 14 November at the Huagong Gymnasium.

Hwang Ye-sul of South Korea won the gold medal.

== Schedule ==
All times are China Standard Time (UTC+08:00)

Date	Time	Event
Sunday, 14 November 2010	10:00	Preliminary
Sunday, 14 November 2010	10:00	Quarterfinals
Sunday, 14 November 2010	15:00	Final of repechage
Sunday, 14 November 2010	15:00	Final of table
Sunday, 14 November 2010	15:00	Finals

== Results ==
=== Main bracket ===
Preliminary
Karen Solomon (PHI)	010
Louize Bourached (LIB)	001
Fouzia Mumtaz (PAK)	000
Sol Kyong (PRK)	100
Marian Urdabayeva (KAZ)	100
Nguyễn Thị Như Ý (VIE)	000

Quarterfinals
Hwang Ye-sul (KOR)	100
Karen Solomon (PHI)	000
Chen Fei (CHN)	101
Tsend-Ayuushiin Naranjargal (MGL)	000
Mina Watanabe (JPN)	001
Sol Kyong (PRK)	100
Marian Urdabayeva (KAZ)	001
Nasiba Surkiýewa (TKM)	000

Final of table
Hwang Ye-sul (KOR)	110
Chen Fei (CHN)	000
Sol Kyong (PRK)	002
Marian Urdabayeva (KAZ)	001

Gold medal
Hwang Ye-sul (KOR)	100
Sol Kyong (PRK)	000

=== Repechage ===
Final of repechage
Karen Solomon (PHI)	000
Tsend-Ayuushiin Naranjargal (MGL)	100
Mina Watanabe (JPN)	100
Nasiba Surkiýewa (TKM)	000

Bronze medals
Tsend-Ayuushiin Naranjargal (MGL)	100
Marian Urdabayeva (KAZ)	000
Mina Watanabe (JPN)	000
Chen Fei (CHN)	001
