= Aziz Kalkamanuly =

Kazakhstani judoka (born 1993)

Personal information
- Born: 9 January 1993 (age 33)
- Occupation: Judoka

Sport
- Country: Kazakhstan
- Sport: Judo
- Weight class: ‍–‍81 kg

Achievements and titles
- World Champ.: R32 (2015)
- Asian Champ.: (bronze) (2016)
Medal record
Men's judo
Representing Kazakhstan
Asian Games
Silver medal – second place	2014 Incheon	Men's team
Asian Championships
Bronze medal – third place	2016 Tashkent	‍–‍81 kg
IJF Grand Prix
Bronze medal – third place	2014 Astana	‍–‍81 kg
Bronze medal – third place	2015 Tashkent	‍–‍81 kg
Bronze medal – third place	2017 Tbilisi	‍–‍81 kg
World Juniors Championships
Silver medal – second place	2011 Cape Town	‍–‍73 kg
Asian Junior Championships
Bronze medal – third place	2012 Taipei	‍–‍81 kg

Profile at external databases
- IJF: 9635
- JudoInside.com: 76410
- Updated on 7 December 2022

Aziz Kalkamanuly (born 9 January 1993) is a Kazakhstani judoka.

Kalkamanuly is a bronze medalist from the 2017 Judo Grand Prix Tbilisi in the ‍–‍81 kg category.
