= 2016 Asian Judo Championships =

Judo competition

- Host city: Tashkent, Uzbekistan
- Dates: 15–17 April

The 2016 Asian Judo Championships were the 22nd edition of the Asian Judo Championships, and were held in Tashkent, Uzbekistan from April 15 to April 17, 2016.

== Medal summary ==
=== Men ===
Event	Gold	Silver	Bronze
Extra lightweight −60 kg	Yeldos Smetov; Kazakhstan	Diyorbek Urozboev; Uzbekistan	Tsend-Ochiryn Tsogtbaatar; Mongolia
Extra lightweight −60 kg	Yeldos Smetov; Kazakhstan	Diyorbek Urozboev; Uzbekistan	Yuma Oshima; Japan
Half lightweight −66 kg	Dovdony Altansükh; Mongolia	Alireza Khojasteh; Iran	Davaadorjiin Tömörkhüleg; Mongolia
Half lightweight −66 kg	Dovdony Altansükh; Mongolia	Alireza Khojasteh; Iran	Yeldos Zhumakanov; Kazakhstan
Lightweight −73 kg	Soichi Hashimoto; Japan	Didar Khamza; Kazakhstan	Mirali Sharipov; Uzbekistan
Lightweight −73 kg	Soichi Hashimoto; Japan	Didar Khamza; Kazakhstan	Sun Shuai; China
Half middleweight −81 kg	Nyamsürengiin Dagvasüren; Mongolia	Nacif Elias; Lebanon	Saeid Mollaei; Iran
Half middleweight −81 kg	Nyamsürengiin Dagvasüren; Mongolia	Nacif Elias; Lebanon	Aziz Kalkamanuly; Kazakhstan
Middleweight −90 kg	Komronshokh Ustopiriyon; Tajikistan	Yūsuke Kobayashi; Japan	Ibrahim Khalaf; Jordan
Middleweight −90 kg	Komronshokh Ustopiriyon; Tajikistan	Yūsuke Kobayashi; Japan	Cheng Xunzhao; China
Half heavyweight −100 kg	Naidangiin Tüvshinbayar; Mongolia	Soyib Kurbonov; Uzbekistan	Ramziddin Sayidov; Uzbekistan
Half heavyweight −100 kg	Naidangiin Tüvshinbayar; Mongolia	Soyib Kurbonov; Uzbekistan	Maxim Rakov; Kazakhstan
Heavyweight +100 kg	Kokoro Kageura; Japan	Abdullo Tangriev; Uzbekistan	Iurii Krakovetskii; Kyrgyzstan
Heavyweight +100 kg	Kokoro Kageura; Japan	Abdullo Tangriev; Uzbekistan	Yerzhan Shynkeyev; Kazakhstan
Team	Uzbekistan	Mongolia	Kazakhstan
Team	Uzbekistan	Mongolia	Japan

=== Women ===
Event	Gold	Silver	Bronze
Extra lightweight −48 kg	Galbadrakhyn Otgontsetseg; Kazakhstan	Mönkhbatyn Urantsetseg; Mongolia	Funa Tonaki; Japan
Extra lightweight −48 kg	Galbadrakhyn Otgontsetseg; Kazakhstan	Mönkhbatyn Urantsetseg; Mongolia	Kim Sol-mi; North Korea
Half lightweight −52 kg	Ai Shishime; Japan	Ma Yingnan; China	Gülbadam Babamuratowa; Turkmenistan
Half lightweight −52 kg	Ai Shishime; Japan	Ma Yingnan; China	Mönkhbaataryn Bundmaa; Mongolia
Lightweight −57 kg	Dorjsürengiin Sumiyaa; Mongolia	Kim Jan-di; South Korea	Lien Chen-ling; Chinese Taipei
Lightweight −57 kg	Dorjsürengiin Sumiyaa; Mongolia	Kim Jan-di; South Korea	Anzu Yamamoto; Japan
Half middleweight −63 kg	Marian Urdabayeva; Kazakhstan	Megumi Tsugane; Japan	Tsend-Ayuushiin Tserennadmid; Mongolia
Half middleweight −63 kg	Marian Urdabayeva; Kazakhstan	Megumi Tsugane; Japan	Yang Junxia; China
Middleweight −70 kg	Yoko Ono; Japan	Kim Seong-yeon; South Korea	Gulnoza Matniyazova; Uzbekistan
Middleweight −70 kg	Yoko Ono; Japan	Kim Seong-yeon; South Korea	Zhou Chao; China
Half heavyweight −78 kg	Zhang Zhehui; China	Rika Takayama; Japan	Pürevjargalyn Lkhamdegd; Mongolia
Half heavyweight −78 kg	Zhang Zhehui; China	Rika Takayama; Japan	Sol Kyong; North Korea
Heavyweight +78 kg	Kim Min-jeong; South Korea	Gulzhan Issanova; Kazakhstan	Manami Inoue; Japan
Heavyweight +78 kg	Kim Min-jeong; South Korea	Gulzhan Issanova; Kazakhstan	Odkhüügiin Javzmaa; Mongolia
Team	Japan	Mongolia	Kazakhstan
Team	Japan	Mongolia	China

== Medal table ==
Rank	Nation	Gold	Silver	Bronze	Total
1	Japan	5	3	5	13
2	Mongolia	4	3	6	13
3	Kazakhstan	3	2	6	11
4	Uzbekistan	1	3	3	7
5	South Korea	1	2	0	3
6	China	1	1	5	7
7	Tajikistan	1	0	0	1
8	Iran	0	1	1	2
9	Lebanon	0	1	0	1
10	North Korea	0	0	2	2
11	Chinese Taipei	0	0	1	1
11	Jordan	0	0	1	1
11	Kyrgyzstan	0	0	1	1
11	Turkmenistan	0	0	1	1
Totals (14 entries)		16	16	32	64
