= 2015 Asian Judo Championships =

Judo competition

- Host city: Kuwait City, Kuwait
- Dates: 13–15 May
- Main venue: Al-Qadsia Indoor Stadium

The 2015 Asian Judo Championships were the 21st edition of the Asian Judo Championships, and were held in Kuwait City, Kuwait from May 13 to May 15, 2015.

== Medal summary ==
=== Men ===
Event	Gold	Silver	Bronze
Extra lightweight −60 kg	Kim Won-jin; South Korea	Shinji Kido; Japan	Sharafuddin Lutfillaev; Uzbekistan
Extra lightweight −60 kg	Kim Won-jin; South Korea	Shinji Kido; Japan	Otar Bestaev; Kyrgyzstan
Half lightweight −66 kg	Tomofumi Takajo; Japan	An Ba-ul; South Korea	Yeldos Zhumakanov; Kazakhstan
Half lightweight −66 kg	Tomofumi Takajo; Japan	An Ba-ul; South Korea	Davaadorjiin Tömörkhüleg; Mongolia
Lightweight −73 kg	An Chang-rim; South Korea	Sharofiddin Boltaboev; Uzbekistan	Ganbaataryn Odbayar; Mongolia
Lightweight −73 kg	An Chang-rim; South Korea	Sharofiddin Boltaboev; Uzbekistan	Soichi Hashimoto; Japan
Half middleweight −81 kg	Keita Nagashima; Japan	Kim Jae-bum; South Korea	Otgonbaataryn Uuganbaatar; Mongolia
Half middleweight −81 kg	Keita Nagashima; Japan	Kim Jae-bum; South Korea	Saeid Mollaei; Iran
Middleweight −90 kg	Gwak Dong-han; South Korea	Daiki Nishiyama; Japan	Komronshokh Ustopiriyon; Tajikistan
Middleweight −90 kg	Gwak Dong-han; South Korea	Daiki Nishiyama; Japan	Sherali Juraev; Uzbekistan
Half heavyweight −100 kg	Kaihan Takagi; Japan	Maxim Rakov; Kazakhstan	Saidzhalol Saidov; Tajikistan
Half heavyweight −100 kg	Kaihan Takagi; Japan	Maxim Rakov; Kazakhstan	Shah Hussain Shah; Pakistan
Heavyweight +100 kg	Abdullo Tangriev; Uzbekistan	Iurii Krakovetskii; Kyrgyzstan	Yerzhan Shynkeyev; Kazakhstan
Heavyweight +100 kg	Abdullo Tangriev; Uzbekistan	Iurii Krakovetskii; Kyrgyzstan	Kenta Nishigata; Japan
Team	Japan	Uzbekistan	Kazakhstan
Team	Japan	Uzbekistan	South Korea

=== Women ===
Event	Gold	Silver	Bronze
Extra lightweight −48 kg	Haruna Asami; Japan	Mönkhbatyn Urantsetseg; Mongolia	Kim Sol-mi; North Korea
Extra lightweight −48 kg	Haruna Asami; Japan	Mönkhbatyn Urantsetseg; Mongolia	Kang Yu-jeong; South Korea
Half lightweight −52 kg	Ma Yingnan; China	Mönkhbaataryn Bundmaa; Mongolia	Yuka Nishida; Japan
Half lightweight −52 kg	Ma Yingnan; China	Mönkhbaataryn Bundmaa; Mongolia	Rim Song-sim; North Korea
Lightweight −57 kg	Momo Tamaoki; Japan	Lien Chen-ling; Chinese Taipei	Kim Jan-di; South Korea
Lightweight −57 kg	Momo Tamaoki; Japan	Lien Chen-ling; Chinese Taipei	Liu Yang; China
Half middleweight −63 kg	Tsedevsürengiin Mönkhzayaa; Mongolia	Maho Nishikawa; Japan	Bak Ji-yun; South Korea
Half middleweight −63 kg	Tsedevsürengiin Mönkhzayaa; Mongolia	Maho Nishikawa; Japan	Marian Urdabayeva; Kazakhstan
Middleweight −70 kg	Tsend-Ayuushiin Naranjargal; Mongolia	Gulnoza Matniyazova; Uzbekistan	Karen Nun-Ira; Japan
Middleweight −70 kg	Tsend-Ayuushiin Naranjargal; Mongolia	Gulnoza Matniyazova; Uzbekistan	Zhou Chao; China
Half heavyweight −78 kg	Mami Umeki; Japan	Sol Kyong; North Korea	Yoon Hyun-ji; South Korea
Half heavyweight −78 kg	Mami Umeki; Japan	Sol Kyong; North Korea	Zhang Zhehui; China
Heavyweight +78 kg	Yu Song; China	Kim Min-jeong; South Korea	Nami Inamori; Japan
Heavyweight +78 kg	Yu Song; China	Kim Min-jeong; South Korea	Gulzhan Issanova; Kazakhstan
Team	Japan	South Korea	Chinese Taipei
Team	Japan	South Korea	Mongolia

== Medal table ==
Rank	Nation	Gold	Silver	Bronze	Total
1	Japan	8	3	5	16
2	South Korea	3	4	5	12
3	Mongolia	2	2	4	8
4	China	2	0	3	5
5	Uzbekistan	1	3	2	6
6	Kazakhstan	0	1	5	6
7	North Korea	0	1	2	3
8	Chinese Taipei	0	1	1	2
8	Kyrgyzstan	0	1	1	2
10	Tajikistan	0	0	2	2
11	Iran	0	0	1	1
11	Pakistan	0	0	1	1
Totals (12 entries)		16	16	32	64

== Participating nations ==
206 athletes from 30 nations competed.

- Afghanistan (3)
- Bangladesh (1)
- China (13)
- Chinese Taipei (14)
- Hong Kong (4)
- India (14)
- Iran (5)
- Iraq (3)
- Japan (14)
- Jordan (5)
- Kazakhstan (13)
- Kuwait (8)
- Kyrgyzstan (12)
- Lebanon (5)
- Macau (3)
- Mongolia (14)
- North Korea (6)
- Pakistan (7)
- Palestine (2)
- Qatar (2)
- Saudi Arabia (5)
- South Korea (13)
- Sri Lanka (5)
- Syria (2)
- Tajikistan (7)
- Thailand (8)
- Turkmenistan (5)
- United Arab Emirates (1)
- Uzbekistan (10)
- Vietnam (2)
