= 2013 Asian Judo Championships =

Judo competition

- Host city: Bangkok, Thailand
- Dates: 19–21 April
- Main venue: Bangkok Youth Centre

The 2013 Asian Judo Championships were the 20th edition of the Asian Judo Championships, and were held in Bangkok, Thailand from April 19 to April 21, 2013.

== Medal summary ==
=== Men ===
Event	Gold	Silver	Bronze
Extra lightweight −60 kg	Hirofumi Yamamoto; Japan	Kim Won-jin; South Korea	Yeldos Smetov; Kazakhstan
Extra lightweight −60 kg	Hirofumi Yamamoto; Japan	Kim Won-jin; South Korea	Tsai Ming-yen; Chinese Taipei
Half lightweight −66 kg	Davaadorjiin Tömörkhüleg; Mongolia	Masaaki Fukuoka; Japan	Azamat Mukanov; Kazakhstan
Half lightweight −66 kg	Davaadorjiin Tömörkhüleg; Mongolia	Masaaki Fukuoka; Japan	Hwang Bo-bae; South Korea
Lightweight −73 kg	Hong Kuk-hyon; North Korea	Sainjargalyn Nyam-Ochir; Mongolia	Wang Ki-chun; South Korea
Lightweight −73 kg	Hong Kuk-hyon; North Korea	Sainjargalyn Nyam-Ochir; Mongolia	Huang Chun-ta; Chinese Taipei
Half middleweight −81 kg	Hong Suk-woong; South Korea	Yasuhiro Ebi; Japan	Otgonbaataryn Uuganbaatar; Mongolia
Half middleweight −81 kg	Hong Suk-woong; South Korea	Yasuhiro Ebi; Japan	Amir Ghaseminejad; Iran
Middleweight −90 kg	Shohei Shimowada; Japan	Gwak Dong-han; South Korea	Islam Bozbayev; Kazakhstan
Middleweight −90 kg	Shohei Shimowada; Japan	Gwak Dong-han; South Korea	Khurshid Nabiev; Uzbekistan
Half heavyweight −100 kg	Javad Mahjoub; Iran	Shim Ji-ho; South Korea	Shah Hussain Shah; Pakistan
Half heavyweight −100 kg	Javad Mahjoub; Iran	Shim Ji-ho; South Korea	Battulgyn Temüülen; Mongolia
Heavyweight +100 kg	Gaku Fujii; Japan	Iurii Krakovetskii; Kyrgyzstan	Yerzhan Shynkeyev; Kazakhstan
Heavyweight +100 kg	Gaku Fujii; Japan	Iurii Krakovetskii; Kyrgyzstan	Cho Gu-ham; South Korea
Team	South Korea	Japan	Mongolia
Team	South Korea	Japan	Kazakhstan

=== Women ===
Event	Gold	Silver	Bronze
Extra lightweight −48 kg	Hiromi Endo; Japan	Kim Sol-mi; North Korea	Mönkhbatyn Urantsetseg; Mongolia
Extra lightweight −48 kg	Hiromi Endo; Japan	Kim Sol-mi; North Korea	Mo Qinqin; China
Half lightweight −52 kg	Takumi Miyakawa; Japan	Baljinnyamyn Bat-Erdene; Mongolia	Angom Anita Chanu; India
Half lightweight −52 kg	Takumi Miyakawa; Japan	Baljinnyamyn Bat-Erdene; Mongolia	Liu Jing; China
Lightweight −57 kg	Megumi Ishikawa; Japan	Kim Jan-di; South Korea	Dorjsürengiin Sumiyaa; Mongolia
Lightweight −57 kg	Megumi Ishikawa; Japan	Kim Jan-di; South Korea	Lenariya Mingazova; Kazakhstan
Half middleweight −63 kg	Xu Lili; China	Kim Su-gyong; North Korea	Tsend-Ayuushiin Tserennadmid; Mongolia
Half middleweight −63 kg	Xu Lili; China	Kim Su-gyong; North Korea	Miki Tanaka; Japan
Middleweight −70 kg	Hwang Ye-sul; South Korea	Tsend-Ayuushiin Naranjargal; Mongolia	Karen Nunira; Japan
Middleweight −70 kg	Hwang Ye-sul; South Korea	Tsend-Ayuushiin Naranjargal; Mongolia	Gulnoza Matniyazova; Uzbekistan
Half heavyweight −78 kg	Jeong Gyeong-mi; South Korea	Sol Kyong; North Korea	Battulgyn Mönkhtuyaa; Mongolia
Half heavyweight −78 kg	Jeong Gyeong-mi; South Korea	Sol Kyong; North Korea	Zhang Zhehui; China
Heavyweight +78 kg	Lee Jung-eun; South Korea	Mai Tateyama; Japan	Thonthan Satjadet; Thailand
Heavyweight +78 kg	Lee Jung-eun; South Korea	Mai Tateyama; Japan	Li Yang; China
Team	Japan	Mongolia	South Korea
Team	Japan	Mongolia	Kazakhstan

== Medal table ==
Rank	Nation	Gold	Silver	Bronze	Total
1	Japan	7	4	2	13
2	South Korea	5	4	4	13
3	Mongolia	1	4	7	12
4	North Korea	1	3	0	4
5	China	1	0	4	5
6	Iran	1	0	1	2
7	Kyrgyzstan	0	1	0	1
8	Kazakhstan	0	0	7	7
9	Chinese Taipei	0	0	2	2
9	Uzbekistan	0	0	2	2
11	India	0	0	1	1
11	Pakistan	0	0	1	1
11	Thailand	0	0	1	1
Totals (13 entries)		16	16	32	64

== Participating nations ==
218 athletes from 28 nations competed.

- Afghanistan (1)
- China (13)
- Chinese Taipei (14)
- Hong Kong (5)
- India (12)
- Indonesia (10)
- Iran (7)
- Japan (13)
- Kazakhstan (13)
- Kuwait (7)
- Kyrgyzstan (11)
- Laos (4)
- Lebanon (4)
- Macau (3)
- Mongolia (14)
- Nepal (2)
- North Korea (7)
- Pakistan (3)
- Philippines (9)
- Qatar (4)
- Singapore (1)
- South Korea (14)
- Sri Lanka (3)
- Thailand (14)
- Turkmenistan (8)
- United Arab Emirates (3)
- Uzbekistan (14)
- Vietnam (5)
