= Amir Ghaseminejad =

Iranian judoka (born 1985)

Personal information
- Born: 11 September 1985 (age 40)
- Occupation: Judoka

Sport
- Country: Iran
- Sport: Judo
- Weight class: ‍–‍81 kg

Achievements and titles
- World Champ.: R16 (2013)
- Asian Champ.: (bronze) (2011, 2012, 2013)
Medal record
Men's judo
Representing Iran
Asian Championships
Bronze medal – third place	2011 Abu Dhabi	‍–‍81 kg
Bronze medal – third place	2012 Tashkent	‍–‍81 kg
Bronze medal – third place	2013 Bangkok	‍–‍81 kg
IJF Grand Prix
Silver medal – second place	2013 Tashkent	‍–‍81 kg
Bronze medal – third place	2014 Ulaanbaatar	‍–‍81 kg

Profile at external databases
- IJF: 6992
- JudoInside.com: 80634
- Updated on 26 December 2022

Amir Ghaseminejad (Persian: امیر قاسمی نژاد, born in 1985 in Mashhad) was an Iranian judoka.

Ghaseminejad competed for Iran at the following tournaments:

- 2011 Asian Judo Championships, Bronze Medal
- 2011 World Judo Championships, Quarter Finals
- 2011 Grand Slam, Brazil
- 2012 Asian Judo Championships, Bronze Medal
- 2012 World Cup, Prague
