= Judo at the 2010 Asian Games – Women's 78 kg =

Judo competition

Women's 78 kg at the 2010 Asian Games
- Venue: Huagong Gymnasium
- Date: 13 November 2010
- Competitors: 8 from 8 nations

Medalists
| gold medal | Jeong Gyeong-mi | South Korea |
| silver medal | Akari Ogata | Japan |
| bronze medal | Yang Xiuli | China |
| bronze medal | Galiya Ulmentayeva | Kazakhstan |

The women's 78 kilograms (half heavyweight) competition at the 2010 Asian Games in Guangzhou was held on 13 November at the Huagong Gymnasium.

== Schedule ==
All times are China Standard Time (UTC+08:00)

| Date | Time | Event |
|---|---|---|
| Saturday, 13 November 2010 | 10:00 | Quarterfinals |
| Saturday, 13 November 2010 | 15:00 | Final of repechage |
| Saturday, 13 November 2010 | 15:00 | Final of table |
| Saturday, 13 November 2010 | 15:00 | Finals |

== Results ==
=== Main bracket ===
| Quarterfinals | | Final of table | | Gold medal |
| Akari Ogata (JPN) | 102 |
| Trần Thúy Duy (VIE) | 000 | Akari Ogata (JPN) | 111 |
| Pürevjargalyn Lkhamdegd (MGL) | 001 | Galiya Ulmentayeva (KAZ) | 000 |
| Galiya Ulmentayeva (KAZ) | 100 | | | Akari Ogata (JPN) | 000 |
| Yang Xiuli (CHN) | 100 | | | Jeong Gyeong-mi (KOR) | 100 |
| Ruth Dugaduga (PHI) | 000 | Yang Xiuli (CHN) | 001 |
| Jeong Gyeong-mi (KOR) | 102 | Jeong Gyeong-mi (KOR) | 101 |
| Dinara Kakharova (KGZ) | 000 |

=== Repechage ===
Final of repechage
Trần Thúy Duy (VIE) | 000
Pürevjargalyn Lkhamdegd (MGL) | 100
Ruth Dugaduga (PHI) | 000
Dinara Kakharova (KGZ) | 010

Bronze medals
Pürevjargalyn Lkhamdegd (MGL) | 000
Yang Xiuli (CHN) | 100
Dinara Kakharova (KGZ) | 000
Galiya Ulmentayeva (KAZ) | 101
