= Judo at the 2014 Asian Games – Women's 70 kg =

Judo competition

Women's 70 kg at the 2014 Asian Games
- Venue: Dowon Gymnasium
- Date: 21 September 2014
- Competitors: 11 from 11 nations

Medalists
| gold medal | Kim Seong-yeon | South Korea |
| silver medal | Chizuru Arai | Japan |
| bronze medal | Chen Fei | China |
| bronze medal | Tsend-Ayuushiin Naranjargal | Mongolia |

The women's 70 kilograms (middleweight) competition at the 2014 Asian Games in Incheon was held on 21 September 2014 at the Dowon Gymnasium.

Kim Seong-yeon of South Korea won the gold medal.

== Schedule ==
All times are Korea Standard Time (UTC+09:00)

| Date | Time | Event |
|---|---|---|
| Sunday, 21 September 2014 | 14:00 | Elimination round of 16 |
| Sunday, 21 September 2014 | 14:00 | Quarterfinals |
| Sunday, 21 September 2014 | 14:00 | Semifinals |
| Sunday, 21 September 2014 | 14:00 | Final of repechage |
| Sunday, 21 September 2014 | 19:00 | Finals |

== Results ==
=== Main bracket ===
Elimination round of 16
Caren Chammas (LIB) | 010
Aizhan Kadyrbekova (KGZ) | 100
Dinara Kudarova (KAZ) | 100
Nasiba Surkiýewa (TKM) | 000
Surattana Thongsri (THA) | 000
Kim Jong-sun (PRK) | 001

Quarterfinals
Kim Seong-yeon (KOR) | 101
Aizhan Kadyrbekova (KGZ) | 000
Tsend-Ayuushiin Naranjargal (MGL) | 100
Gulnoza Matniyazova (UZB) | 000
Chizuru Arai (JPN) | 100
Dinara Kudarova (KAZ) | 000
Chen Fei (CHN) | 000
Kim Jong-sun (PRK) | 000

Semifinals
Kim Seong-yeon (KOR) | 110
Tsend-Ayuushiin Naranjargal (MGL) | 000
Chizuru Arai (JPN) | 000
Chen Fei (CHN) | 000

Gold medal contest
Kim Seong-yeon (KOR) | 010
Chizuru Arai (JPN) | 000

=== Repechage ===
Final of repechage
Aizhan Kadyrbekova (KGZ) | 000
Gulnoza Matniyazova (UZB) | 100
Dinara Kudarova (KAZ) | 001
Kim Jong-sun (PRK) | 012

Bronze medal contests
Gulnoza Matniyazova (UZB) | 000
Chen Fei (CHN) | 000
Kim Jong-sun (PRK) | 000
Tsend-Ayuushiin Naranjargal (MGL) | 001
