= Judo at the 2010 Asian Games – Women's 57 kg =

Judo competition

Women's 57 kg at the 2010 Asian Games
- Venue: Huagong Gymnasium
- Date: 15 November 2010
- Competitors: 17 from 17 nations

Medalists
gold medal	Kaori Matsumoto	Japan
silver medal	Kim Jan-di	South Korea
bronze medal	Tümen-Odyn Battögs	Mongolia
bronze medal	Lien Chen-ling	Chinese Taipei

The women's 57 kilograms (lightweight) competition at the 2010 Asian Games in Guangzhou was held on 15 November at the Huagong Gymnasium.

== Schedule ==
All times are China Standard Time (UTC+08:00)

Date	Time	Event
Monday, 15 November 2010	10:00	Preliminary 1
Monday, 15 November 2010	10:00	Preliminary 2
Monday, 15 November 2010	10:00	Quarterfinals
Monday, 15 November 2010	15:00	Final of repechage
Monday, 15 November 2010	15:00	Final of table
Monday, 15 November 2010	15:00	Finals

== Results ==
=== Main bracket ===
==== Final ====
Gold medal
Kaori Matsumoto (JPN)	001
Kim Jan-di (KOR)	000

==== Top half ====
Preliminary 1

Preliminary 2
Kaori Matsumoto (JPN)	100
Ranju Rai (NEP)	000
Alina Ten (KAZ)	100
Angom Anita Chanu (IND)	000
Rim Yun-hui (PRK)	020
Zuhra Madraimowa (TKM)	000
Zhu Guirong (CHN)	020
Elena Isakova (KGZ)	000

Quarterfinals
Kaori Matsumoto (JPN)	100
Alina Ten (KAZ)	000
Rim Yun-hui (PRK)	101
Zhu Guirong (CHN)	000

Final of table
Kaori Matsumoto (JPN)	001
Rim Yun-hui (PRK)	000

==== Bottom half ====
Preliminary 1
Akram Khani (IRI)	000
Om Pongchaliew (THA)	010

Preliminary 2
Kim Jan-di (KOR)	100
Fahima Rezayee (AFG)	000
Iroda Abdurahmanova (UZB)	002
Om Pongchaliew (THA)	001
Tümen-Odyn Battögs (MGL)	021
Nguyễn Thị Lan (VIE)	000
Lien Chen-ling (TPE)	100
Cheang Ka Mei (MAC)	000

Quarterfinals
Kim Jan-di (KOR)	002
Iroda Abdurahmanova (UZB)	001
Tümen-Odyn Battögs (MGL)	000
Lien Chen-ling (TPE)	000

Final of table
Kim Jan-di (KOR)	100
Tümen-Odyn Battögs (MGL)	000

=== Repechage ===
Final of repechage
Alina Ten (KAZ)	000
Zhu Guirong (CHN)	101
Iroda Abdurahmanova (UZB)	000
Lien Chen-ling (TPE)	001

Bronze medals
Zhu Guirong (CHN)	001
Tümen-Odyn Battögs (MGL)	002
Lien Chen-ling (TPE)	100
Rim Yun-hui (PRK)	000
