= Sol Kyong =

North Korean judoka (born 1990)

Personal information
- Born: 8 June 1990 (age 36)
- Occupation: Judoka

Korean name
- Hangul: 설경
- RR: Seol Gyeong
- MR: Sŏl Kyŏng

Sport
- Country: North Korea
- Sport: Judo
- Weight class: ‍–‍70 kg, ‍–‍78 kg

Achievements and titles
- World Champ.: (2013)
- Asian Champ.: (silver) (2010, 2013, 2014, 2015)
Medal record
Women's judo
Representing North Korea
World Championships
Gold medal – first place	2013 Rio de Janeiro	‍–‍78 kg
Asian Games
Silver medal – second place	2010 Guangzhou	‍–‍70 kg
Silver medal – second place	2014 Incheon	‍–‍78 kg
Bronze medal – third place	2014 Incheon	Women's team
Asian Championships
Silver medal – second place	2013 Bangkok	‍–‍78 kg
Silver medal – second place	2015 Kuwait City	‍–‍78 kg
Bronze medal – third place	2012 Tashkent	‍–‍70 kg
Bronze medal – third place	2016 Tashkent	‍–‍78 kg
IJF Grand Slam
Bronze medal – third place	2014 Abu Dhabi	‍–‍78 kg
IJF Grand Prix
Gold medal – first place	2014 Ulaanbaatar	‍–‍78 kg
Gold medal – first place	2014 Qingdao	‍–‍78 kg
Bronze medal – third place	2015 Tbilisi	‍–‍78 kg
Bronze medal – third place	2015 Tashkent	‍–‍78 kg
Bronze medal – third place	2016 Samsun	‍–‍78 kg

Profile at external databases
- IJF: 6846
- JudoInside.com: 72283
- Updated on 10 July 2023

Sol Kyong (Korean: 설경; Korean pronunciation: [sʌl.ɡjʌŋ] or [sʌl] [kjʌŋ]; born 8 June 1990) is a North Korean judoka. She represents the sports team of the Pyongyang University of Mechanical Engineering.
