= Battulgyn Mönkhtuyaa =

Mongolian judoka (born 1988)

Personal information
- Born: 18 February 1988 (age 38)
- Occupation: Judoka

Sport
- Country: Mongolia
- Sport: Judo
- Weight class: +78 kg

Achievements and titles
- World Champ.: R16 (2014)
- Asian Champ.: (bronze) (2013, 2017)
Medal record
Women's judo
Representing Mongolia
Asian Championships
Bronze medal – third place	2013 Bangkok	‍–‍78 kg
Bronze medal – third place	2017 Hong Kong	+78 kg
IJF Grand Prix
Gold medal – first place	2013 Ulaanbaatar	‍–‍78 kg
Bronze medal – third place	2016 Ulaanbaatar	+78 kg
Bronze medal – third place	2017 Antalya	+78 kg
Bronze medal – third place	2017 Hohhot	+78 kg

Profile at external databases
- IJF: 5684
- JudoInside.com: 48740
- Updated on 23 October 2022

Battulgyn Mönkhtuyaa (Mongolian: Баттулгын Мөнхтуяа; born 18 February 1988) is a Mongolian judoka.

Battulgyn was the bronze medalist from the 2017 Judo Grand Prix Hohhot in the +78 kg category.
