= 2011 World Judo Championships – Women's 63 kg =

Judo competition

Judo Women's 63 kg at the 2011 World Judo Championships
- Venue: Accor Arena
- Location: Paris, France
- Date: 25 August 2011
- Competitors: 60 from 46 nations

Medalists
gold medal	Gévrise Émane (1st title)	France
silver medal	Yoshie Ueno	Japan
bronze medal	Anicka van Emden	Netherlands
bronze medal	Urška Žolnir	Slovenia

Competition at external databases
- Links: IJF • JudoInside

The women's 63 kg competition of the 2011 World Judo Championships was held on August 25.

== Medalists ==
Gold	Silver	Bronze
Gévrise Émane (FRA)	Yoshie Ueno (JPN)	Anicka van Emden (NED); Urška Žolnir (SLO)

== Results ==
=== Pool A ===
First Round
(Japan) Yoshie Ueno	101
(Venezuela) Ysis Barreto	000
(India) Garima Chaudhary	000
(South Korea) Joung Da-Woon	100
(Vietnam) Hoa Bui Thi	000
(North Korea) Kim Su-Gyong	111
(Slovakia) Ivana Komlosiova	000
(Croatia) Marijana Miskovic	000
(Netherlands) Anicka van Emden	010
(Russia) Vera Koval	000
(Azerbaijan) Ramila Yusubova	100
(Hong Kong) Leung Po Sum	000
(Moldova) Marianna Davidova	110
(North Macedonia) Katerina Nikoloska	001

Quarterfinals
(Japan) Yoshie Ueno	100
(South Korea) Joung Da-Woon	000
(North Korea) Kim Su-Gyong	101
(Slovakia) Ivana Komlosiova	000
(Netherlands) Anicka van Emden	001
(France) Clarisse Agbegnenou	000
(Azerbaijan) Ramila Yusubova	001
(Moldova) Marianna Davidova	000

Semifinals
(Japan) Yoshie Ueno	100
(North Korea) Kim Su-Gyong	000
(Netherlands) Anicka van Emden	100
(Azerbaijan) Ramila Yusubova	000

Final
(Japan) Yoshie Ueno	001
(Netherlands) Anicka van Emden	000

=== Pool B ===
First Round
(Slovenia) Urška Žolnir	011
(Hungary) Bernadett Baczko	001
(Australia) Kylie Koenig	000
(Kazakhstan) Aigerim Kydyrbayeva	100
(Andorra) Laura Salles Lopez	000
(Israel) Yarden Gerbi	100
(Turkmenistan) Gulnar Hayytbaeva	000
(United States) Janine Nakao	100
(Germany) Claudia Malzahn	000
(Italy) Edwige Gwend	100
(United Kingdom) Faith Pitman	002
(Mongolia) Munkhzaya Tsedevsuren	001
(Mexico) Karina Acosta	000
(Turkey) Busra Katipoglu	100

Quarterfinals
(Slovenia) Urška Žolnir	100
(Kazakhstan) Aigerim Kydyrbayeva	000
(Israel) Yarden Gerbi	110
(United States) Janine Nakao	000
(Italy) Edwige Gwend	000
(China) Xu Yuhua	100
(United Kingdom) Faith Pitman	000
(Turkey) Busra Katipoglu	001

Semifinals
(Slovenia) Urška Žolnir	101
(Israel) Yarden Gerbi	000
(China) Xu Yuhua	102
(Turkey) Busra Katipoglu	000

Final
(Slovenia) Urška Žolnir	100
(China) Xu Yuhua	000

=== Pool C ===
First Round
(France) Gévrise Émane	100
(Chad) Demos Memneloum	000
(Senegal) Fary Seye	000
(United Kingdom) Sarah Clark	100
(Hungary) Eszter Gáspár	100
(Australia) Stevie Kelly	000
(China) Xu Lili	100
(Spain) Yahaira Aguirre	000
(Cuba) Maricet Espinosa	101
(Japan) Kana Abe	000
(Ukraine) Oksana Didenko	100
(United States) Christal Ransom	000
(Lithuania) Laura Naginskaitė	000
(South Korea) Kong Ja-Young	100

Quarterfinals
(France) Gévrise Émane	100
(United Kingdom) Sarah Clark	000
(Turkey) Selda Karadag	100
(Hungary) Eszter Gáspár	000
(China) Xu Lili	000
(Cuba) Maricet Espinosa	102
(Ukraine) Oksana Didenko	000
(South Korea) Kong Ja-Young	001

Semifinals
(France) Gévrise Émane	102
(Turkey) Selda Karadag	000
(Cuba) Maricet Espinosa	011
(South Korea) Kong Ja-Young	001

Final
(France) Gévrise Émane	100
(Cuba) Maricet Espinosa	000

=== Pool D ===
First Round
(Netherlands) Elisabeth Willeboordse	101
(Morocco) Rizlen Zouak	000
(Turkmenistan) Mariya Lohova	000
(Malta) Marcon Bezzina	001
(Lebanon) Karen Shammas	000
(Kazakhstan) Zarina Aldikova	102
(Israel) Alice Schlesinger	100
(Finland) Johanna Ylinen	000
(Brazil) Mariana Silva	000
(Austria) Hilde Drexler	100
(Sweden) Anna Bernholm	101
(Russia) Marta Labazina	000
(Burkina Faso) Severine Nebie	010
(Algeria) Kahina Saidi	100

Quarterfinals
(Netherlands) Elisabeth Willeboordse	100
(Thailand) Orapin Senatham	000
(Malta) Marcon Bezzina	000
(Kazakhstan) Zarina Aldikova	102
(Israel) Alice Schlesinger	000
(Austria) Hilde Drexler	001
(Sweden) Anna Bernholm	000
(Algeria) Kahina Saidi	100

Semifinals
(Netherlands) Elisabeth Willeboordse	011
(Kazakhstan) Zarina Aldikova	000
(Austria) Hilde Drexler	100
(Algeria) Kahina Saidi	000

Final
(Netherlands) Elisabeth Willeboordse	100
(Austria) Hilde Drexler	000

=== Repechage ===
Repechage		Third place
(Netherlands) Anicka van Emden	001
(China) Xu Yuhua	000	(Netherlands) Anicka van Emden	002
		(Netherlands) Elisabeth Willeboordse	001

Repechage		Third place
(Cuba) Maricet Espinosa	100
(Austria) Hilde Drexler	000	(Cuba) Maricet Espinosa	000
		(Slovenia) Urška Žolnir	100

=== Finals ===
Semi-finals
(Japan) Yoshie Ueno	100
(Slovenia) Urška Žolnir	000
(France) Gévrise Émane	001
(Netherlands) Elisabeth Willeboordse	000

Final
(Japan) Yoshie Ueno	000
(France) Gévrise Émane	000
