= 2015 World Judo Championships – Women's 63 kg =

Judo competition

Judo Women's 63 kg at the 2015 World Judo Championships
- Venue: Alau Ice Palace
- Location: Astana, Kazakhstan
- Date: 27 August
- Competitors: 48 from 41 nations
- Total prize money: 14,000$

Medalists
gold medal	Tina Trstenjak (1st title)	Slovenia
silver medal	Clarisse Agbegnenou	France
bronze medal	Tsedevsürengiin Mönkhzayaa	Mongolia
bronze medal	Miku Tashiro	Japan

Competition at external databases
- Links: IJF • JudoInside

The women's 63 kg competition of the 2015 World Judo Championships was held on 27 August 2015.

== Results ==
=== Finals ===
Semi-finals
(Slovenia) Tina Trstenjak	100
(Netherlands) Juul Franssen	000
(France) Clarisse Agbegnenou	100
(Israel) Yarden Gerbi	000

Final
(Slovenia) Tina Trstenjak	011
(France) Clarisse Agbegnenou	000

=== Repechage ===
Repechage		Third place
(Mongolia) Tsedevsürengiin Mönkhzayaa	001
(Croatia) Marijana Mišković	000	(Mongolia) Tsedevsürengiin Mönkhzayaa	010
		(Israel) Yarden Gerbi	000

Repechage		Third place
(Japan) Miku Tashiro	011
(Netherlands) Anicka van Emden	000	(Japan) Miku Tashiro	100
		(Netherlands) Juul Franssen	000

=== Pool A ===
First Round
(Russia) Pari Surakatova	010
(Chinese Taipei) Huang Shih-han	000
(Italy) Edwige Gwend	100
(Mexico) Jazmín Toral	000
(Algeria) Imène Agouar	000
(Cuba) Maricet Espinosa	100
(China) Yang Junxia	100
(Brazil) Mariana Silva	000

Second Round
(Slovenia) Tina Trstenjak	001
(Russia) Pari Surakatova	000
(Italy) Edwige Gwend	100
(Sweden) Anna Bernholm	000
(Mongolia) Tsedevsürengiin Mönkhzayaa	100
(Cuba) Maricet Espinosa	001
(China) Yang Junxia	000
(Ecuador) Estefania García	000

Third Round
(Slovenia) Tina Trstenjak	100
(Italy) Edwige Gwend	000
(Mongolia) Tsedevsürengiin Mönkhzayaa	000
(China) Yang Junxia	000

Quarterfinals
(Slovenia) Tina Trstenjak	110
(Mongolia) Tsedevsürengiin Mönkhzayaa	000

=== Pool B ===
First Round
(Slovakia) Ivana Komlóšiová	000
(Poland) Agata Ozdoba	100
(Uzbekistan) Mukhayyo Ibragimova	000
(Croatia) Marijana Mišković	101
(Morocco) Rizlen Zouak	010
(United States) Leilani Akiyama	000
(Netherlands) Juul Franssen	001
(Turkmenistan) Gulnar Hayytbaeva	000

Second Round
(Austria) Kathrin Unterwurzacher	010
(Poland) Agata Ozdoba	000
(Ghana) Szandra Szogedi	000
(Croatia) Marijana Mišković	010
(Germany) Martyna Trajdos	000
(Morocco) Rizlen Zouak	100
(United Kingdom) Alice Schlesinger	000
(Netherlands) Juul Franssen	001

Third Round
(Austria) Kathrin Unterwurzacher	000
(Croatia) Marijana Mišković	100
(Morocco) Rizlen Zouak	000
(Netherlands) Juul Franssen	001

Quarterfinals
(Croatia) Marijana Mišković	000
(Netherlands) Juul Franssen	001

=== Pool C ===
First Round
(Philippines) Kiyomi Watanabe	000
(Austria) Hilde Drexler	100
(Algeria) Souad Belakhal	000
(South Korea) Bak Ji-yun	101
(Cameroon) Hélène Wezeu Dombeu	110
(Andorra) Laura Sallés	000
(Kazakhstan) Marian Urdabayeva	000
(Canada) Stéfanie Tremblay	000

Second Round
(France) Clarisse Agbegnenou	010
(Austria) Hilde Drexler	000
(Hungary) Franciska Szabó	000
(South Korea) Bak Ji-yun	101
(Japan) Miku Tashiro	101
(Cameroon) Hélène Wezeu Dombeu	000
(Croatia) Andreja Đaković	000
(Kazakhstan) Marian Urdabayeva	001

Third Round
(France) Clarisse Agbegnenou	100
(South Korea) Bak Ji-yun	000
(Japan) Miku Tashiro	100
(Kazakhstan) Marian Urdabayeva	000

Quarterfinals
(France) Clarisse Agbegnenou	011
(Japan) Miku Tashiro	000

=== Pool D ===
First Round
(United States) Hannah Martin	100
(Nepal) Phupu Lhamu Khatri	000
(Australia) Katharina Haecker	000
(North Korea) Kim Song-hwa	001
(Sweden) Mia Hermansson	000
(Greece) Elisavet Teltsidou	100
(Mongolia) Tsend-Ayuushiin Tserennadmid	100
(Turkey) Büşra Katipoğlu	000

Second Round
(Israel) Yarden Gerbi	001
(United States) Hannah Martin	000
(Portugal) Ana Cachola	000
(North Korea) Kim Song-hwa	000
(Netherlands) Anicka van Emden	000
(Greece) Elisavet Teltsidou	000
(Spain) Isabel Puche	000
(Mongolia) Tsend-Ayuushiin Tserennadmid	000

Third Round
(Israel) Yarden Gerbi	001
(Portugal) Ana Cachola	000
(Netherlands) Anicka van Emden	000
(Mongolia) Tsend-Ayuushiin Tserennadmid	000

Quarterfinals
(Israel) Yarden Gerbi	000
(Netherlands) Anicka van Emden	000

== Prize money ==
The sums listed bring the total prizes awarded to 14,000$ for the individual event.

Medal	Total	Judoka	Coach
Gold	6,000$	4,800$	1,200$
Silver	4,000$	3,200$	800$
Bronze	2,000$	1,600$	400$
