= Judo at the 2006 Asian Games – Women's 63 kg =

Judo competition

Women's 63 kg at the 2006 Asian Games
- Venue: Qatar SC Indoor Hall
- Date: 3 December 2006
- Competitors: 13 from 13 nations

Medalists
gold medal	Xu Yuhua	China
silver medal	Kong Ja-young	South Korea
bronze medal	Ayumi Tanimoto	Japan
bronze medal	Won Ok-im	North Korea

The women's 63 kilograms (half middleweight) competition at the 2006 Asian Games in Doha was held on 3 December at the Qatar SC Indoor Hall.

== Schedule ==
All times are Arabia Standard Time (UTC+03:00)

Date	Time	Event
Sunday, 3 December 2006	14:00	Round of 16
Sunday, 3 December 2006	14:00	Quarterfinals
Sunday, 3 December 2006	14:00	Repechage −1R
Sunday, 3 December 2006	14:00	Repechage final
Sunday, 3 December 2006	14:00	Semifinals
Sunday, 3 December 2006	14:00	Finals

== Results ==
=== Main bracket ===
Round of 16
Xu Yuhua (CHN)	1000
Nguyễn Thị Như Ý (VIE)	0000
Dinara Kakharova (KGZ)	0000
Won Ok-im (PRK)	1100
Ayumi Tanimoto (JPN)	1000
Cheung Wai Yi (HKG)	0000
Tümen-Odyn Battögs (MGL)	1000
Iroda Abdurahmanova (UZB)	0000
Gülnar Haýytbaýewa (TKM)	1000
Devu Thapa (NEP)	0000

Quarterfinals
Wang Chin-fang (TPE)	0000
Xu Yuhua (CHN)	1000
Won Ok-im (PRK)	0001
Wassanaporn Samthong (THA)	0000
Ayumi Tanimoto (JPN)	1000
Tümen-Odyn Battögs (MGL)	0000
Kong Ja-young (KOR)	1101
Gülnar Haýytbaýewa (TKM)	0000

Semifinals
Xu Yuhua (CHN)	1000
Won Ok-im (PRK)	0000
Ayumi Tanimoto (JPN)	0000
Kong Ja-young (KOR)	1000

Gold medal contest
Xu Yuhua (CHN)	1000
Kong Ja-young (KOR)	0000

=== Repechage ===
Repechage −1R
Nguyễn Thị Như Ý (VIE)	0001
Wang Chin-fang (TPE)	1010
Dinara Kakharova (KGZ)	0000
Wassanaporn Samthong (THA)	1010
Cheung Wai Yi (HKG)	0000
Tümen-Odyn Battögs (MGL)	1000

Repechage final
Wang Chin-fang (TPE)	1000
Wassanaporn Samthong (THA)	0000
Tümen-Odyn Battögs (MGL)	0100
Gülnar Haýytbaýewa (TKM)	0000

Bronze medal contest
Wang Chin-fang (TPE)	0000
Ayumi Tanimoto (JPN)	1000
Tümen-Odyn Battögs (MGL)	0000
Won Ok-im (PRK)	0010
