= Judo at the 2008 Summer Olympics – Women's 63 kg =

Women's 63 kg at the Games of the XXIX Olympiad
- Venue: Beijing Science and Technology; University Gymnasium
- Date: August 12, 2008
- Competitors: 25 from 25 nations
- Winning score: 1000

Medalists
1st place, gold medalist(s)		Ayumi Tanimoto	Japan
2nd place, silver medalist(s)		Lucie Décosse	France
3rd place, bronze medalist(s)		Elisabeth Willeboordse	Netherlands
3rd place, bronze medalist(s)		Won Ok-Im	North Korea

The women's 63 kg (also known as light-middleweight) tournament in the judo at the 2008 Summer Olympics was held on August 11 at the Beijing Science and Technology University Gymnasium. A total of 25 women competed in this event, limited to jūdōka with a body weight of less than 63 kilograms. Preliminary rounds started at 12:00 Noon CST. Repechage finals, semifinals, bouts for bronze medals and the final were held at 18:00pm CST.

This event was the median of the women's judo weight classes, limiting competitors to a maximum of 63 kilograms of body mass. Like all other judo events, bouts lasted five minutes. If the bout was still tied at the end, it was extended for another five-minute, sudden-death period; if neither judoka scored during that period, the match is decided by the judges. The tournament bracket consisted of a single-elimination contest culminating in a gold medal match. There was also a repechage to determine the winners of the two bronze medals. Each judoka who had lost to a semifinalist competed in the repechage. The two judokas who lost in the semifinals faced the winner of the opposite half of the bracket's repechage in bronze medal bouts.

== Qualifying athletes ==
Mat	Athlete	Country
1	Silulu A'etonu	American Samoa
1	Anna von Harnier	Germany
1	Battugs Tumen-Od	Mongolia
1	Lucie Décosse	France
1	Urška Žolnir	Slovenia
1	Alice Schlesinger	Israel
1	Marcon Bezzina	Malta
1	Kahina Saidi	Algeria
1	Elisabeth Willeboordse	Netherlands
1	Vera Koval	Russia
1	Won Ok-Im	North Korea
1	Daniela Krukower	Argentina
1	Catherine Arlove	Australia
2	Sarah Clark	Great Britain
2	Claudia Heill	Austria
2	Driulis González	Cuba
2	Johanna Ylinen	Finland
2	Wang Chin-Fang	Chinese Taipei
2	Devu Thapa	Nepal
2	Ysis Barreto	Venezuela
2	Cécile Hane	Senegal
2	Ayumi Tanimoto	Japan
2	Danielli Yuri	Brazil
2	Kong Ja-Young	South Korea
2	Xu Yuhua	China

== Tournament results ==
=== Final ===
Final
1	Lucie Décosse (FRA)	0000
2	Ayumi Tanimoto (JPN)	1000

=== Mat 1 ===
First Round
Silulu A'etonu (ASA)	0000
Anna von Harnier (GER)	1000
Lucie Décosse (FRA)	1010
Urška Žolnir (SLO)	0000
Marcon Bezzina (MLT)	0000
Kahina Saidi (ALG)	0200
Elisabeth Willeboordse (NED)	0012
Vera Koval (RUS)	0010
Daniela Krukower (ARG)	1000
Catherine Arlove (AUS)	0000

Round of 16
Anna von Harnier (GER)	1001
Battugs Tumen-Od (MGL)	0000
Lucie Décosse (FRA)	0011
Alice Schlesinger (ISR)	0000
Kahina Saidi (ALG)	0001
Elisabeth Willeboordse (NED)	1101
Won Ok-Im (PRK)	0020
Daniela Krukower (ARG)	0010

Quarterfinals
Anna von Harnier (GER)	0001
Lucie Décosse (FRA)	1001
Elisabeth Willeboordse (NED)	0000
Won Ok-Im (PRK)	0200

Semifinals
Lucie Décosse (FRA)	0211
Won Ok-Im (PRK)	0000

=== Mat 2 ===
First Round
Sarah Clark (GBR)	0100
Claudia Heill (AUT)	1011
Johanna Ylinen (FIN)	0000
Wang Chin-Fang (TPE)	1011
Ysis Barreto (VEN)	1012
Cécile Hane (SEN)	0000
Danielli Yuri (BRA)	0100
Kong Ja-Young (KOR)	1000

Round of 16
Driulis González (CUB)	0010
Claudia Heill (AUT)	0001
Wang Chin-Fang (TPE)	1000
Devu Thapa (NEP)	0000
Ysis Barreto (VEN)	0000
Ayumi Tanimoto (JPN)	1000
Kong Ja-Young (KOR)	0100
Xu Yuhua (CHN)	0012

Quarterfinals
Driulis González (CUB)	0010
Wang Chin-Fang (TPE)	0000
Ayumi Tanimoto (JPN)	1000
Kong Ja-Young (KOR)	0001

Semifinals
Driulis González (CUB)	0000
Ayumi Tanimoto (JPN)	1011

=== Repechage ===
First round
Urška Žolnir (SLO)	1001
Alice Schlesinger (ISR)	0000
Daniela Krukower (ARG)
BYE
Claudia Heill (AUT)
BYE
Ysis Barreto (VEN)
BYE

Second round
Anna von Harnier (GER)	0000
Urška Žolnir (SLO)	0200
Elisabeth Willeboordse (NED)	0230
Daniela Krukower (ARG)	0000
Wang Chin-Fang (TPE)	0010
Claudia Heill (AUT)	1010
Kong Ja-Young (KOR)	0100
Ysis Barreto (VEN)	1001

Third round
Urška Žolnir (SLO)	0000
Elisabeth Willeboordse (NED)	0001
Claudia Heill (AUT)	0030
Ysis Barreto (VEN)	0001

Bronze medal finals
Driulis Gonzalez (CUB)	0000
Elisabeth Willeboordse (NED)	0001
Won Ok-Im (PRK)	0110
Claudia Heill (AUT)	0001
