= Alice Schlesinger =

Israeli-British judoka

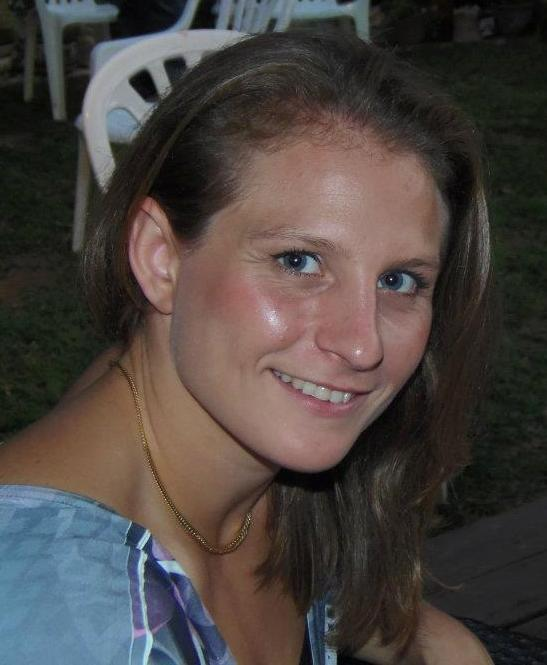
- Alice Schlesinger in 2012

Personal information
- Native name: אליס שלזינגר
- Nationality: Israeli, British
- Born: 26 May 1988 (age 38) Herzliya, Israel
- Occupation: Judoka
- Height: 5 ft 5 in (165 cm)

Sport
- Country: Israel (until 2013); Great Britain (since 2015)
- Sport: Judo, Sambo
- Weight class: ‍–‍63 kg
- Rank: 1st dan black belt
- Coached by: Pavel Musin

Achievements and titles
- Olympic Games: 7th (2012)
- World Champ.: (bronze) (2009)
- European Champ.: (silver) (2019)
Medal record
Women's judo
Representing Israel
World Championships
Bronze medal – third place	2009 Rotterdam	‍–‍63 kg
European Championships
Bronze medal – third place	2008 Lisbon	‍–‍63 kg
Bronze medal – third place	2009 Tbilisi	‍–‍63 kg
Bronze medal – third place	2012 Chelyabinsk	‍–‍63 kg
World Masters
Bronze medal – third place	2010 Suwon	‍–‍63 kg
IJF Grand Slam
Gold medal – first place	2012 Moscow	‍–‍63 kg
Bronze medal – third place	2012 Paris	‍–‍63 kg
IJF Grand Prix
Gold medal – first place	2011 Baku	‍–‍63 kg
Silver medal – second place	2011 Düsseldorf	‍–‍63 kg
Bronze medal – third place	2011 Qingdao	‍–‍63 kg
Bronze medal – third place	2013 Samsun	‍–‍63 kg
European U23 Championships
Gold medal – first place	2009 Antalya	‍–‍63 kg
World Juniors Championships
Bronze medal – third place	2004 Budapest	‍–‍57 kg
European Junior Championships
Gold medal – first place	2007 Prague	‍–‍63 kg
Silver medal – second place	2006 Tallinn	‍–‍63 kg
Bronze medal – third place	2005 Zagreb	‍–‍63 kg
European Cadet Championships
Gold medal – first place	2004 Rotterdam	‍–‍57 kg
European Youth Olympic Festival
Bronze medal – third place	2003 Paris	‍–‍52 kg
Maccabiah Games
Gold medal – first place	2005 Maccabiah Games
Representing Great Britain
European Games
Silver medal – second place	2019 Minsk	‍–‍63 kg
European Championships
Bronze medal – third place	2017 Warsaw	‍–‍63 kg
IJF Grand Slam
Gold medal – first place	2016 Baku	‍–‍63 kg
Gold medal – first place	2017 Baku	‍–‍63 kg
Bronze medal – third place	2015 Baku	‍–‍63 kg
Bronze medal – third place	2015 Tyumen	‍–‍63 kg
IJF Grand Prix
Gold medal – first place	2015 Düsseldorf	‍–‍63 kg
Silver medal – second place	2016 Düsseldorf	‍–‍63 kg
Silver medal – second place	2017 The Hague	‍–‍63 kg
Silver medal – second place	2018 The Hague	‍–‍63 kg
Bronze medal – third place	2015 Samsun	‍–‍63 kg
Bronze medal – third place	2015 Jeju	‍–‍63 kg
Bronze medal – third place	2019 Antalya	‍–‍63 kg
Bronze medal – third place	2019 Perth	‍–‍63 kg
Women's sambo
Representing Israel
World Championships
Gold medal – first place	2013 St. Petersburg	‍–‍64 kg
Gold medal – first place	2014 Narita	‍–‍64 kg
Gold medal – first place	2021 Tashkent	‍–‍72 kg
European Championships
Gold medal – first place	2014 Bucharest	‍–‍64 kg
Silver medal – second place	2021 Limassol	‍–‍65 kg
Bronze medal – third place	2023 Haifa	‍–‍72 kg
Summer Universiade
Gold medal – first place	2013 Kazan	‍–‍64 kg
Women's belt wrestling
Representing Israel
Summer Universiade
Gold medal – first place	2013 Kazan	‍–‍66 kg

Profile at external databases
- IJF: 850, 18044
- JudoInside.com: 31043
- Updated on 3 September 2023

Alice Schlesinger (Hebrew: אליס שלזינגר; born 26 May 1988) is an Israeli-British retired judoka and sambo competitor. She is a shodan in Judo.

Born in Israel, she competed for that country until 2014, but following a dispute with the national federation, in 2015 she started competing for Great Britain, of whom she is a citizen through her English-born mother.

She is a World Judo Championships bronze medalist (2009), European Judo Championships silver (2019) and bronze (2008, 2009, 2012 & 2017) medalist, world champion in Sambo (2013, 2014 & 2021) as well as world champion in Kurash (2013).

== Early life ==
Schlesinger was born and raised in Herzliya, Israel. Her father is an Israeli Jew, whereas her mother is English-born and a convert to Judaism. Her brother introduced her to the sport as a child and her parents took her to competitions on weekends. She is trained by her Israeli boyfriend/coach, Pavel Musin.

== Judo career ==
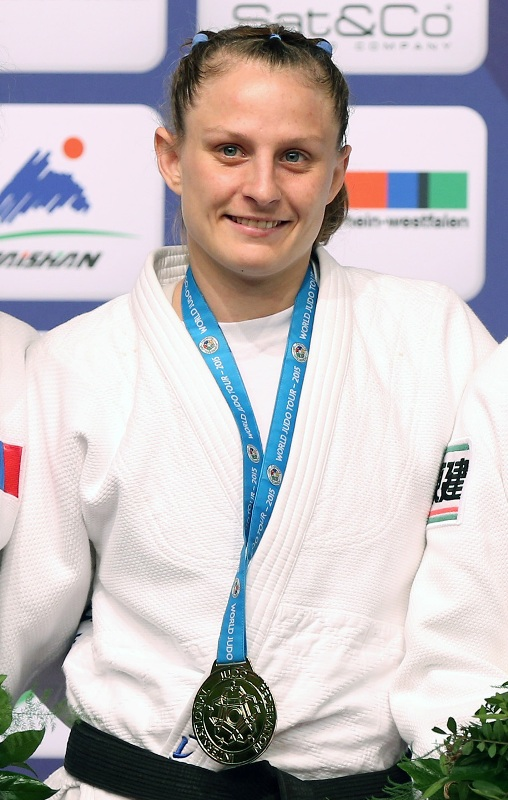
Schlesinger in 2015

=== For Israel ===
Schlesinger has won two Israel national championships (including in 2004, at ‍–‍57 kg). She also won Continental gold medals in the U17, U20, and U23 competitions.

In July 2004, Schlesinger won the 2004 European Cadet Championships, at ‍–‍57 kg, in Rotterdam, Netherlands. In October 2004, she won a bronze medal at the 2004 World Juniors Championships, at ‍–‍57 kg, in Budapest, Hungary.

In July 2005, at the age of 17, Schlesinger competed in the 2005 Maccabiah Games, winning the gold medal by defeating the world champion and former Israeli Daniela Krukower. In October 2005, she won a bronze medal at the 2005 European Junior Championships, at ‍–‍63 kg, in Zagreb, Croatia.

In September, Schlesinger won a silver medal at the 2006 European Junior Championships, at ‍–‍63 kg, in Tallinn, Estonia. Despite the medal, she said: "I had a mediocre tournament. I made mistakes in the final. I plan to go over those mistakes with my coach and correct what needs to be corrected".

In October, Schlesinger won the 2007 European Junior Championships, at ‍–‍63 kg, in Prague, Czech Republic.

Schlesinger competed at the age of 20 on behalf of Israel at the 2008 Summer Olympics in Beijing, China, as a half-middleweight at ‍–‍63 kg, and placed 13th, losing to French silver medalist Lucie Décosse.

In April 2008 and April 2009, Schlesinger won bronze medals at the 2008 European Championships and 2009 European Championships, at ‍–‍63 kg, in Lisbon, Portugal, and Tbilisi, Georgia.

In August, Schlesinger won a bronze medal in the 2009 World Championships, at ‍–‍63 kg, in Rotterdam. In November she won the 2009 European U23 Championships, at ‍–‍63 kg, in Antalya, Turkey. The Olympic Committee of Israel selected her as its 2009 co-Athlete of the Year.

In August 2011, Schlesinger was ranked 6th in the world in her weight class. In September 2011, she won a silver medal at the 2011 Düsseldorf Grand Prix in Germany, at ‍–‍63 kg. She lost only one match, in the finals by judges' decision to Yoshie Ueno of Japan, the world champion for the prior two years, after beating four opponents, including European champion Elisabeth Willeboordse of the Netherlands.

In July 2012 Schlesinger reached the quarter finals of the 2012 Summer Olympics but lost to Urška Žolnir of Slovenia.

Following the London Olympics, Schlesinger and the Israel Judo Association (IJA) became embroiled in a much publicized conflict. Schlesinger says that the IJA ordered her to put on weight so she could move up a weight class, to make room for Yarden Gerbi in the ‍–‍63 kg class. Her personal trainer's salary was also cut by the IJA. The IJA denies she was asked to change weight classes, and says it moved to a different, team-oriented coaching program which required Schlesinger to change coaches. As a result of the conflict, Schlesinger decided to stop competing for the Israeli national team, and to compete instead for Great Britain.

=== For Great Britain ===
In December 2014 the International Judo Federation confirmed that former Israeli Olympian Alice Schlesinger will now compete for Great Britain.

Since then, Schlesinger's accomplishments include a silver medal at the European Judo Open in Sofia, Bulgaria, a gold medal at the 2015 Düsseldorf Grand Prix and a silver medal at the European Women's Judo Open in Prague.

At the 2016 Olympics, Schlesinger beat Bak Ji-yun in the first round before losing to Anicka van Emden in the second round.

At the April 2017 European Championships in Warsaw, Poland, Schlesinger won a bronze medal in the ‍–‍63 kg.

In May 2019, Schlesinger was selected to compete at the 2019 European Games in Minsk, Belarus, where she won silver.

== Medals ==
Year	Tournament	Place	Rep.	Ref.
2005	Maccabiah Games	1st place, gold medalist(s)	ISR	
2008	European Championships	3rd place, bronze medalist(s)	ISR	
2009	European Championships	3rd place, bronze medalist(s)	ISR	
2009	World Championships	3rd place, bronze medalist(s)	ISR	
2010	World Masters	3rd place, bronze medalist(s)	ISR	
2011	Grand Prix Düsseldorf	2nd place, silver medalist(s)	ISR	
2011	Grand Prix Baku	1st place, gold medalist(s)	ISR	
2011	Grand Prix Qingdao	3rd place, bronze medalist(s)	ISR	
2012	Grand Slam Paris	3rd place, bronze medalist(s)	ISR	
2012	European Championships	3rd place, bronze medalist(s)	ISR	
2012	Grand Slam Moscow	1st place, gold medalist(s)	ISR	
2013	Grand Prix Samsun	3rd place, bronze medalist(s)	ISR	
2015	Grand Prix Düsseldorf	1st place, gold medalist(s)	GBR	
2015	Grand Prix Samsun	3rd place, bronze medalist(s)	GBR	
2015	Grand Slam Baku	3rd place, bronze medalist(s)	GBR	
2015	Grand Slam Tyumen	3rd place, bronze medalist(s)	GBR	
2015	Grand Prix Jeju	3rd place, bronze medalist(s)	GBR	
2016	Grand Prix Düsseldorf	2nd place, silver medalist(s)	GBR	
2016	Grand Slam Baku	1st place, gold medalist(s)	GBR	
2017	Grand Slam Baku	1st place, gold medalist(s)	GBR	
2017	European Championships	3rd place, bronze medalist(s)	GBR	
2017	Grand Prix The Hague	2nd place, silver medalist(s)	GBR	
2018	Grand Prix The Hague	2nd place, silver medalist(s)	GBR	
2019	Grand Prix Antalya	3rd place, bronze medalist(s)	GBR	
2019	European Games	2nd place, silver medalist(s)	GBR	

== See also ==
- Sports in Israel
- List of select Jewish judokas
