= Tsedevsürengiin Mönkhzayaa =

Mongolian retired judoka (born 1986)

Tsedevsürengiin Mönkhzaya
Personal information
- Nationality: Mongolian
- Born: 13 June 1986 (age 40)
- Occupation: Judoka
- Height: 1.65 m (5 ft 5 in)

Sport
- Country: Mongolia
- Sport: Judo
- Weight class: –63 kg

Achievements and titles
- Olympic Games: 5th (2012)
- World Champ.: (bronze) (2015)
- Asian Champ.: (gold) (2015)
Medal record
Women's judo
Representing Mongolia
World Championships
Bronze medal – third place	2015 Astana	‍–‍63 kg
Asian Championships
Gold medal – first place	2015 Kuwait City	‍–‍63 kg
Silver medal – second place	2012 Tashkent	‍–‍63 kg
Bronze medal – third place	2009 Taipei	‍–‍63 kg
Bronze medal – third place	2011 Abu Dhabi	‍–‍63 kg
IJF Grand Slam
Gold medal – first place	2015 Tyumen	‍–‍63 kg
Silver medal – second place	2011 Moscow	‍–‍63 kg
Bronze medal – third place	2012 Moscow	‍–‍63 kg
IJF Grand Prix
Silver medal – second place	2011 Qingdao	‍–‍63 kg
Silver medal – second place	2015 Düsseldorf	‍–‍63 kg
Silver medal – second place	2015 Tbilisi	‍–‍63 kg
Bronze medal – third place	2011 Düsseldorf	‍–‍63 kg
Bronze medal – third place	2011 Amsterdam	‍–‍63 kg
Bronze medal – third place	2014 Tashkent	‍–‍63 kg
Bronze medal – third place	2016 Düsseldorf	‍–‍63 kg
Bronze medal – third place	2016 Qingdao	‍–‍63 kg
Asian Junior Championships
Bronze medal – third place	2005 Beirut	‍–‍70 kg

Profile at external databases
- IJF: 196
- JudoInside.com: 31988
- Updated on 3 July 2023

Tsedevsürengiin Mönkhzaya (Mongolian: Цэдэвсүрэнгийн Мөнхзаяа, born 13 June 1986) is a Mongolian retired judoka. At the 2012 Summer Olympics she competed in the women's 63 kg. Her first and quickest performance was on the fourth day of the 2012 Summer Olympics on 31 July 2012, during the elimination round of 32 matches. In three rounds totaling only 46 seconds, she expeditiously defeated Palau's 35-year-old Jennifer Anson. In that match, Munkhzaya Tsedevsuren scored Ippon, the perfect score of 110 to 0. In the 16th elimination round, she defeated Finland's Johanna Ylinen with a score of 100 to 0. In the quarterfinal, she defeated France's Gévrise Émane and advanced to the semifinal of Table B where she lost to Slovenia's Urška Žolnir who went on to win the gold. Munkhzaya Tsedevsuren fought for the bronze and lost to Japan's Yoshie Ueno.
