= Judo at the 2014 Asian Games – Women's team =

Judo competition

Women's team at the 2014 Asian Games
- Venue: Dowon Gymnasium
- Date: 23 September 2014
- Competitors: 56 from 9 nations

Medalists
gold medal	Japan; Misato Nakamura, Emi Yamagishi, Anzu Yamamoto, Kana Abe, Chizuru Arai, Nami Inamori, Mami Umeki
silver medal	South Korea; Jeong Bo-kyeong, Jung Eun-jung, Kim Jan-di, Bak Ji-yun, Joung Da-woon, Kim Seong-yeon, Kim Eun-kyeong, Lee Jung-eun
bronze medal	China; Ma Yingnan, Wu Shugen, Zhou Ying, Yang Junxia, Chen Fei, Ma Sisi, Zhang Zhehui
bronze medal	North Korea; Kim Sol-mi, Ri Chang-ok, Ri Hyo-sun, Kim Su-gyong, Kim Jong-sun, Sol Kyong

The women's team competition at the 2014 Asian Games in Incheon was held on 23 September at the Dowon Gymnasium.

== Schedule ==
All times are Korea Standard Time (UTC+09:00)

Date	Time	Event
Tuesday, 23 September 2014	14:00	Elimination round of 16
Tuesday, 23 September 2014	14:00	Quarterfinals
Tuesday, 23 September 2014	16:30	Semifinals
Tuesday, 23 September 2014	17:20	Final of repechage
Tuesday, 23 September 2014	20:00	Finals

== Results ==
=== Bracket ===
==== Main ====
Elimination round of 16
Chinese Taipei	3
Nepal	1

Quarterfinals
Japan	4
China	1
Kazakhstan	4
Chinese Taipei	1
Mongolia	4
Thailand	1
South Korea	5
North Korea	0

Semifinals
Japan	5
Kazakhstan	0
Mongolia	2
South Korea	3

Gold medal contest
Japan	4
South Korea	1

==== Repechage ====
Final of repechage
China	5
Chinese Taipei	0
Thailand	0
North Korea	5

Bronze medal contests
China	3
Mongolia	2
North Korea	4
Kazakhstan	1

=== Elimination round of 16 ===
Chinese Taipei	3–1	Nepal

Lien Pei-ju	100–000	—	52 kg
—	000–100	Devika Khadka	57 kg
Chang Ya-jau	000–000	Phupu Lhamu Khatri	63 kg
—	000–000	—	70 kg
Wang Szu-chu	101–000	Sunita Bohara	+70 kg

=== Quarterfinals ===
Japan	4–1	China

Misato Nakamura	000–000	Ma Yingnan	52 kg
Anzu Yamamoto	101–000	Zhou Ying	57 kg
Kana Abe	000–000	Yang Junxia	63 kg
Chizuru Arai	000–000	Chen Fei	70 kg
Nami Inamori	000–000	Ma Sisi	+70 kg

Kazakhstan	4–1	Chinese Taipei

Aigul Baikuleva	000–100	Lien Pei-ju	52 kg
Nazgul Kubasheva	100–000	—	57 kg
Marian Urdabayeva	100–000	Chang Ya-jau	63 kg
Dinara Kudarova	100–000	—	70 kg
Albina Amangeldiyeva	010–000	Wang Szu-chu	+70 kg

Mongolia	4–1	Thailand

Mönkhbaataryn Bundmaa	100–000	Orn-areeya Konngoen	52 kg
Dorjsürengiin Sumiyaa	001–000	Om Pongchaliew	57 kg
Tsend-Ayuushiin Tserennadmid	101–000	Orapin Senatham	63 kg
Tsend-Ayuushiin Naranjargal	000–001	Surattana Thongsri	70 kg
Battulgyn Mönkhtuyaa	100–000	Thonthan Satjadet	+70 kg

South Korea	5–0	North Korea

Jung Eun-jung	001–000	Kim Sol-mi	52 kg
Kim Jan-di	001–000	Ri Hyo-sun	57 kg
Joung Da-woon	001–000	Kim Su-gyong	63 kg
Kim Seong-yeon	010–000	Kim Jong-sun	70 kg
Lee Jung-eun	010–000	Sol Kyong	+70 kg

=== Semifinals ===
Japan	5–0	Kazakhstan

Misato Nakamura	100–000	Aigul Baikuleva	52 kg
Anzu Yamamoto	100–000	Nazgul Kubasheva	57 kg
Kana Abe	100–000	Marian Urdabayeva	63 kg
Chizuru Arai	100–000	Dinara Kudarova	70 kg
Nami Inamori	100–000	Zarina Raifova	+70 kg

Mongolia	2–3	South Korea

Mönkhbaataryn Bundmaa	001–000	Jung Eun-jung	52 kg
Dorjsürengiin Sumiyaa	000–000	Kim Jan-di	57 kg
Tsend-Ayuushiin Tserennadmid	100–000	Joung Da-woon	63 kg
Tsend-Ayuushiin Naranjargal	000–000	Kim Seong-yeon	70 kg
Battulgyn Mönkhtuyaa	000–001	Lee Jung-eun	+70 kg

=== Final of repechage ===
China	5–0	Chinese Taipei

Ma Yingnan	110–000	Lien Pei-ju	52 kg
Zhou Ying	100–000	—	57 kg
Yang Junxia	100–000	Chang Ya-jau	63 kg
Chen Fei	100–000	—	70 kg
Ma Sisi	100–000	Wang Szu-chu	+70 kg

Thailand	0–5	North Korea

Orn-areeya Konngoen	000–100	Kim Sol-mi	52 kg
Om Pongchaliew	000–100	Ri Hyo-sun	57 kg
Orapin Senatham	000–001	Kim Su-gyong	63 kg
Surattana Thongsri	000–000	Kim Jong-sun	70 kg
Thonthan Satjadet	000–100	Sol Kyong	+70 kg

=== Bronze medal contests ===
China	3–2	Mongolia

—	000–100	Mönkhbaataryn Bundmaa	52 kg
Zhou Ying	000–100	Dorjsürengiin Sumiyaa	57 kg
Yang Junxia	100–000	Tsend-Ayuushiin Tserennadmid	63 kg
Chen Fei	100–000	Tsend-Ayuushiin Naranjargal	70 kg
Ma Sisi	100–000	Battulgyn Mönkhtuyaa	+70 kg

North Korea	4–1	Kazakhstan

Kim Sol-mi	100–000	—	52 kg
Ri Hyo-sun	100–000	Nazgul Kubasheva	57 kg
Kim Su-gyong	000–100	Marian Urdabayeva	63 kg
Kim Jong-sun	101–000	Dinara Kudarova	70 kg
Sol Kyong	111–000	Albina Amangeldiyeva	+70 kg

=== Gold medal contest ===
Japan	4–1	South Korea

Misato Nakamura	011–100	Jung Eun-jung	52 kg
Anzu Yamamoto	100–000	Kim Jan-di	57 kg
Kana Abe	100–000	Bak Ji-yun	63 kg
Chizuru Arai	000–000	Kim Seong-yeon	70 kg
Nami Inamori	100–000	Lee Jung-eun	+70 kg

== Non-participating athletes ==
- Wu Shugen (CHN)
- Zhang Zhehui (CHN)
- Mami Umeki (JPN)
- Emi Yamagishi (JPN)
- Lenariya Mingazova (KAZ)
- Jeong Bo-kyeong (KOR)
- Kim Eun-kyeong (KOR)
- Odkhüügiin Javzmaa (MGL)
- Baldorjiin Möngönchimeg (MGL)
- Adiyaasambuugiin Tsolmon (MGL)
- Mönkhbatyn Urantsetseg (MGL)
- Ri Chang-ok (PRK)
- Hsu Wan-chu (TPE)
