= Judo at the 2010 Asian Games – Women's 63 kg =

Judo competition

Women's 63 kg at the 2010 Asian Games
- Venue: Huagong Gymnasium
- Date: 14 November 2010
- Competitors: 14 from 14 nations

Medalists
gold medal	Yoshie Ueno	Japan
silver medal	Wang Chin-fang	Chinese Taipei
bronze medal	Kong Ja-young	South Korea
bronze medal	Kim Su-gyong	North Korea

The women's 63 kilograms (half middleweight) competition at the 2010 Asian Games in Guangzhou was held on 14 November at the Huagong Gymnasium.

Yoshie Ueno of Japan won the gold medal.

== Schedule ==
All times are China Standard Time (UTC+08:00)

Date	Time	Event
Sunday, 14 November 2010	10:00	Preliminary
Sunday, 14 November 2010	10:00	Quarterfinals
Sunday, 14 November 2010	15:00	Final of repechage
Sunday, 14 November 2010	15:00	Final of table
Sunday, 14 November 2010	15:00	Finals

== Results ==
=== Main bracket ===
Preliminary
Yoshie Ueno (JPN)	100
Zhanar Zhanzunova (KAZ)	000
Garima Chaudhary (IND)	100
Yasmeen Al-Salem (IOC)	000
Selengiin Enkhzayaa (MGL)	101
Caren Chammas (LIB)	000
Elena Proskurakova (KGZ)	001
Gülnar Haýytbaýewa (TKM)	002
Lin Meiling (CHN)	100
Surrattana Thongsri (THA)	000
Wang Chin-fang (TPE)	101
Toktam Bidel (IRI)	000

Quarterfinals
Yoshie Ueno (JPN)	100
Garima Chaudhary (IND)	000
Kim Su-gyong (PRK)	011
Selengiin Enkhzayaa (MGL)	010
Kong Ja-young (KOR)	020
Gülnar Haýytbaýewa (TKM)	000
Lin Meiling (CHN)	002
Wang Chin-fang (TPE)	010

Final of table
Yoshie Ueno (JPN)	000
Kim Su-gyong (PRK)	000
Kong Ja-young (KOR)	000
Wang Chin-fang (TPE)	101

Gold medal
Yoshie Ueno (JPN)	101
Wang Chin-fang (TPE)	000

=== Repechage ===
Final of repechage
Garima Chaudhary (IND)	000
Selengiin Enkhzayaa (MGL)	100
Gülnar Haýytbaýewa (TKM)	000
Lin Meiling (CHN)	020

Bronze medals
Selengiin Enkhzayaa (MGL)	000
Kong Ja-young (KOR)	001
Lin Meiling (CHN)	000
Kim Su-gyong (PRK)	100
