= Joung Da-woon =

South Korean judoka (born 1989)

Personal information
- Born: 23 April 1989 (age 37)
- Occupation: Judoka

Korean name
- Hangul: 정다운
- Hanja: 丁多雲
- RR: Jeong Daun
- MR: Chŏng Taun

Sport
- Country: South Korea
- Sport: Judo
- Weight class: ‍–‍63 kg

Achievements and titles
- Olympic Games: 5th (2012)
- World Champ.: R16 (2010)
- Asian Champ.: (gold) (2014)
Medal record
Women's judo
Representing South Korea
Asian Games
Gold medal – first place	2014 Incheon	‍–‍63 kg
Silver medal – second place	2014 Incheon	Women's team
Asian Championships
Silver medal – second place	2011 Abu Dhabi	‍–‍63 kg
Bronze medal – third place	2012 Tashkent	‍–‍63 kg
World Masters
Bronze medal – third place	2013 Tyumen	‍–‍63 kg
IJF Grand Slam
Silver medal – second place	2012 Paris	‍–‍63 kg
Bronze medal – third place	2010 Tokyo	‍–‍63 kg
Bronze medal – third place	2013 Tokyo	‍–‍63 kg
IJF Grand Prix
Gold medal – first place	2012 Düsseldorf	‍–‍63 kg
Gold medal – first place	2013 Jeju	‍–‍63 kg
Silver medal – second place	2014 Ulaanbaatar	‍–‍63 kg
Asian Junior Championships
Silver medal – second place	2006 Jeju	‍–‍63 kg
Summer Universiade
Gold medal – first place	2013 Kazan	Women's team

Profile at external databases
- IJF: 2166
- JudoInside.com: 54451
- Updated on 20 November 2022

Joung Da-woon (born 23 April 1989, Seoul) is a South Korean judoka. At the 2012 Summer Olympics she competed in the Women's 63 kg, but was defeated in the semifinals. She beat Ramila Yusubova and Yoshie Ueno before losing to Xu Lili. Because Xu reached the final Joung was entered into the repechage, where she lost her bronze medal match to Gévrise Émane.

== Filmography ==
=== Television show ===
Year	Title	Role	Notes	Ref.
2022	Over the Top	Contestant		
2023	World's First Merchant	Contestant	Season 2	
