= Judo at the 2014 Asian Games – Women's 63 kg =

Judo competition

Women's 63 kg at the 2014 Asian Games
- Venue: Dowon Gymnasium
- Date: 21 September 2014
- Competitors: 12 from 12 nations

Medalists
gold medal	Joung Da-woon	South Korea
silver medal	Yang Junxia	China
bronze medal	Marian Urdabayeva	Kazakhstan
bronze medal	Kana Abe	Japan

The women's 63 kilograms (Half middleweight) competition at the 2014 Asian Games in Incheon was held on 21 September at the Dowon Gymnasium.

Joung Da-woon of South Korea won the gold medal.

== Schedule ==
All times are Korea Standard Time (UTC+09:00)

Date	Time	Event
Sunday, 21 September 2014	14:00	Elimination round of 16
Sunday, 21 September 2014	14:00	Quarterfinals
Sunday, 21 September 2014	14:00	Semifinals
Sunday, 21 September 2014	14:00	Final of repechage
Sunday, 21 September 2014	19:00	Finals

== Results ==
=== Main bracket ===
Elimination round of 16
Kiyomi Watanabe (PHI)	100
Gülnar Haýytbaýewa (TKM)	000
Marian Urdabayeva (KAZ)	100
Gulzhaz Saiimova (KGZ)	000
Chang Ya-jau (TPE)	100
Phupu Lhamu Khatri (NEP)	000
Kim Su-gyong (PRK)	100
Orapin Senatham (THA)	000

Quarterfinals
Kana Abe (JPN)	002
Kiyomi Watanabe (PHI)	000
Yang Junxia (CHN)	001
Marian Urdabayeva (KAZ)	000
Joung Da-woon (KOR)	100
Chang Ya-jau (TPE)	000
Baldorjiin Möngönchimeg (MGL)	012
Kim Su-gyong (PRK)	000

Semifinals
Kana Abe (JPN)	000
Yang Junxia (CHN)	001
Joung Da-woon (KOR)	100
Baldorjiin Möngönchimeg (MGL)	000

Gold medal contest
Yang Junxia (CHN)	000
Joung Da-woon (KOR)	001

=== Repechage ===
Final of repechage
Kiyomi Watanabe (PHI)	000
Marian Urdabayeva (KAZ)	100
Chang Ya-jau (TPE)	000
Kim Su-gyong (PRK)	000

Bronze medal contests
Marian Urdabayeva (KAZ)	010
Baldorjiin Möngönchimeg (MGL)	000
Kim Su-gyong (PRK)	000
Kana Abe (JPN)	101
