= Jennifer Anson =

American-Palauan judoka (born 1977)

Personal information
- Born: March 5, 1977 (age 48); New York City, USA
- Height: 1.65 m (5 ft 5 in)
- Weight: 63 kg (139 lb)

Sport
- Country: Palau
- Sport: Judo

Jennifer Anson (born March 5, 1977, in New York City, United States) is an American-Palaun judoka.

At the 2012 Summer Olympics Jennifer Anson competed on behalf of the Republic of Palau in Women's 63 kg, but she was defeated in the initial elimination round of 32. Anson lost her first Olympic bout to a younger and more seasoned Mongolian opponent, Munkhzaya Tsedevsuren. Tsedevsuren went on to compete in the quarter finals before losing to the eventual gold medalist, Slovenia's Urška Žolnir. Anson's bout lasted 46 seconds, before her 26-year-old Mongolian opponent emerged with the victory. Anson's defeat resulted from an Ippon, or technical knockout, and a perfect score of 110 to 0 for Tsedevsuren, the highest possible score in judo. The strangling technique used by Tsedevsuren in her victory over Anson is known as a okuri eri jime.

The 46 second round was the shortest contest in the elimination round of 32. After the match, Anson stated that, "when I was out there, everything blacked out in my head". Later she added, “when the fight started, I forgot everything. I wanted to be defensive-minded but still trying to be aggressive. All of sudden I was on the mat and the fight was lost.”

At 35 years, Anson was also the oldest competitor among the 24 contestants in the 63k category, followed by 33-year-old Elisabeth Willeboordse of the Netherlands. The majority of the Olympic athletes were in their 20s. Anson continues to coach and mentor youngsters in Palau, and she explained that she intended to continue to try and set an example for younger members of her judo club in Palau.

Ms. Anson serves as the National Security Coordinator for the Republic of Palau.
