= Wu Shugen =

Mongol judoka

Personal information
- Born: 26 August 1987 (age 39)
- Occupation: Judoka

Sport
- Country: China
- Sport: Judo
- Weight class: –48 kg, –52 kg

Achievements and titles
- Olympic Games: 7th (2012)
- World Champ.: 7th (2011)
- Asian Champ.: (gold) (2010)
Medal record
Women's judo
Representing China
Asian Games
Gold medal – first place	2010 Guangzhou	–48 kg
Bronze medal – third place	2014 Incheon	Women's team
Asian Championships
Silver medal – second place	2012 Tashkent	–48 kg
IJF Grand Slam
Bronze medal – third place	2010 Rio de Janeiro	–48 kg
IJF Grand Prix
Gold medal – first place	2010 Qingdao	–48 kg
Gold medal – first place	2014 Düsseldorf	–48 kg
Silver medal – second place	2011 Abu Dhabi	–48 kg
Silver medal – second place	2013 Qingdao	–48 kg
Silver medal – second place	2018 Hohhot	–52 kg
Bronze medal – third place	2011 Düsseldorf	–48 kg
Bronze medal – third place	2011 Amsterdam	–48 kg
Bronze medal – third place	2014 Ulaanbaatar	–48 kg
World Juniors Championships
Silver medal – second place	2006 Santo Domingo	–48 kg
Asian Junior Championships
Gold medal – first place	2004 Doha	–48 kg
Silver medal – second place	2006 Jeju	–48 kg

Profile at external databases
- IJF: 2181
- JudoInside.com: 34355
- Updated on 28 November 2022

Wu Shugen (Mongolian: Ündes; born 26 August 1987 in Inner Mongolia) is a female Mongol judoka from China who competed at the 2008 Summer Olympics and 2012 Summer Olympics in the Extra lightweight (under 48 kg) event. At the 2008 Summer Olympics, she lost in the quarterfinals to Ryoko Tani. In the repechage she beat Sayaka Matsumoto, before losing to Paula Pareto. She beat Lisa Kearney before losing to Sarah Menezes in the 2012 Summer Olympics. In the repechage she lost to Éva Csernoviczki.

== Major performances ==
- 2007 Paris Super World Cup - 1st -48 kg class

== See also ==
- China at the 2008 Summer Olympics
