= 2011 Judo Grand Prix Qingdao =

Judo competition

Judo 2011 Judo Grand Prix Qingdao
- Location: Qingdao, China
- Dates: 17–18 December 2011
- Competitors: 401 from 61 nations

Competition at external databases
- Links: IJF • JudoInside

The 2011 Judo Grand Prix Qingdao was held in Qingdao, China from 17 to 18 December 2011.

== Medal summary ==
=== Men's events ===
Event	Gold	Silver	Bronze
Extra-lightweight (−60 kg)	Georgii Zantaraia (UKR)	Naohisa Takato (JPN)	Issam Nour (FRA)
Extra-lightweight (−60 kg)	Georgii Zantaraia (UKR)	Naohisa Takato (JPN)	Yeldos Smetov (KAZ)
Half-lightweight (−66 kg)	Alim Gadanov (RUS)	Tomasz Kowalski (POL)	Dimitri Dragin (FRA)
Half-lightweight (−66 kg)	Alim Gadanov (RUS)	Tomasz Kowalski (POL)	Serhiy Drebot (UKR)
Lightweight (−73 kg)	Wang Ki-chun (KOR)	Takenori Nakamura (JPN)	Sainjargalyn Nyam-Ochir (MGL)
Lightweight (−73 kg)	Wang Ki-chun (KOR)	Takenori Nakamura (JPN)	Michael Eldred (USA)
Half-middleweight (−81 kg)	Keita Nagashima (JPN)	Alain Schmitt (FRA)	Ivan Nifontov (RUS)
Half-middleweight (−81 kg)	Keita Nagashima (JPN)	Alain Schmitt (FRA)	Sirazhudin Magomedov (RUS)
Middleweight (−90 kg)	Masashi Nishiyama (JPN)	Hesham Mesbah (EGY)	Kirill Denisov (RUS)
Middleweight (−90 kg)	Masashi Nishiyama (JPN)	Hesham Mesbah (EGY)	Erdenebilegiin Enkhbat (MGL)
Half-heavyweight (−100 kg)	Hwang Hee-tae (KOR)	Levan Zhorzholiani (GEO)	Artem Bloshenko (UKR)
Half-heavyweight (−100 kg)	Hwang Hee-tae (KOR)	Levan Zhorzholiani (GEO)	Ariel Ze'evi (ISR)
Heavyweight (+100 kg)	Ihar Makarau (BLR)	Kim Sung-min (KOR)	Cho Gu-ham (KOR)
Heavyweight (+100 kg)	Ihar Makarau (BLR)	Kim Sung-min (KOR)	Rafael Silva (BRA)

=== Women's events ===
Event	Gold	Silver	Bronze
Extra-lightweight (−48 kg)	Charline Van Snick (BEL)	Oiana Blanco (ESP)	Jeong Bo-kyeong (KOR)
Extra-lightweight (−48 kg)	Charline Van Snick (BEL)	Oiana Blanco (ESP)	Miri Toda (JPN)
Half-lightweight (−52 kg)	Mönkhbaataryn Bundmaa (MGL)	An Kum-ae (PRK)	Yuki Hashimoto (JPN)
Half-lightweight (−52 kg)	Mönkhbaataryn Bundmaa (MGL)	An Kum-ae (PRK)	Érika Miranda (BRA)
Lightweight (−57 kg)	Kim Jan-di (KOR)	Ioulietta Boukouvala (GRE)	Liu Yang (CHN)
Lightweight (−57 kg)	Kim Jan-di (KOR)	Ioulietta Boukouvala (GRE)	Lu Tongjuan (CHN)
Half-middleweight (−63 kg)	Xu Lili (CHN)	Tsedevsürengiin Mönkhzayaa (MGL)	Anicka van Emden (NED)
Half-middleweight (−63 kg)	Xu Lili (CHN)	Tsedevsürengiin Mönkhzayaa (MGL)	Alice Schlesinger (ISR)
Middleweight (−70 kg)	Chen Fei (CHN)	Kim Seong-yeon (KOR)	Erica Barbieri (ITA)
Middleweight (−70 kg)	Chen Fei (CHN)	Kim Seong-yeon (KOR)	Yao Yuting (CHN)
Half-heavyweight (−78 kg)	Kayla Harrison (USA)	Yang Xiuli (CHN)	Lucie Louette (FRA)
Half-heavyweight (−78 kg)	Kayla Harrison (USA)	Yang Xiuli (CHN)	Zhang Jie (CHN)
Heavyweight (+78 kg)	Tong Wen (CHN)	Qin Qian (CHN)	Karina Bryant (GBR)
Heavyweight (+78 kg)	Tong Wen (CHN)	Qin Qian (CHN)	Kang Jie (CHN)

Source Results

=== Medal table ===
* Host nation (China)

Rank	Nation	Gold	Silver	Bronze	Total
1	China (CHN)*	3	2	5	10
2	South Korea (KOR)	3	2	2	7
3	Japan (JPN)	2	2	2	6
4	Mongolia (MGL)	1	1	2	4
5	Russia (RUS)	1	0	3	4
6	Ukraine (UKR)	1	0	2	3
7	United States (USA)	1	0	1	2
8	Belarus (BLR)	1	0	0	1
8	Belgium (BEL)	1	0	0	1
10	France (FRA)	0	1	3	4
11	Egypt (EGY)	0	1	0	1
11	Georgia (GEO)	0	1	0	1
11	Greece (GRE)	0	1	0	1
11	North Korea (PRK)	0	1	0	1
11	Poland (POL)	0	1	0	1
11	Spain (ESP)	0	1	0	1
17	Brazil (BRA)	0	0	2	2
17	Israel (ISR)	0	0	2	2
19	Great Britain (GBR)	0	0	1	1
19	Italy (ITA)	0	0	1	1
19	Kazakhstan (KAZ)	0	0	1	1
19	Netherlands (NED)	0	0	1	1
Totals (22 entries)		14	14	28	56
