= Nami Inamori =

Japanese judoka (born 1993)

Personal information
- Born: 15 October 1993 (age 32)
- Occupation: Judoka

Sport
- Country: Japan
- Sport: Judo
- Weight class: +78 kg

Achievements and titles
- Asian Champ.: (gold) (2017)
Medal record
Women's judo
Representing Japan
Asian Games
Gold medal – first place	2014 Incheon	Women's team
Silver medal – second place	2014 Incheon	+78 kg
Asian Championships
Gold medal – first place	2017 Hong Kong	+78 kg
Bronze medal – third place	2015 Kuwait City	+78 kg
IJF Grand Slam
Gold medal – first place	2014 Tokyo	+78 kg
Gold medal – first place	2015 Tokyo	+78 kg
Gold medal – first place	2016 Tyumen	+78 kg
Silver medal – second place	2015 Tyumen	+78 kg
Bronze medal – third place	2018 Osaka	+78 kg
IJF Grand Prix
Bronze medal – third place	2014 Qingdao	+78 kg
Bronze medal – third place	2017 Zagreb	+78 kg
Bronze medal – third place	2019 Montreal	+78 kg
World Juniors Championships
Gold medal – first place	2013 Ljubljana	+78 kg

Profile at external databases
- IJF: 14820
- JudoInside.com: 83515
- Updated on 23 November 2022

Nami Inamori (稲森 奈見, Inamori Nami; born 15 October 1993) is a Japanese judoka.

Inamori is the gold medalist of the 2014 Judo Grand Slam Tokyo in the +78 kg category.
