= 2013 Judo Grand Prix Jeju =

Judo competition

Judo 2013 Judo Grand Prix Jeju
- Location: Jeju City, South Korea
- Dates: 7–8 December 2013
- Competitors: 185 from 30 nations

Competition at external databases
- Links: IJF • JudoInside

The 2013 Judo Grand Prix Jeju was held in Jeju City, South Korea from 7 to 8 December 2013.

== Medal summary ==
=== Men's events ===
| Event | Gold | Silver | Bronze |
|---|---|---|---|
| Extra-lightweight (−60 kg) | Kim Won-jin (KOR) | Tsai Ming-yen (TPE) | Hwang Dong-kyu (KOR) |
| Extra-lightweight (−60 kg) | Kim Won-jin (KOR) | Tsai Ming-yen (TPE) | Ryō Kawabata (JPN) |
| Half-lightweight (−66 kg) | Yuhei Rokugo (JPN) | Kengo Takaichi (JPN) | Youn Tae-ho (KOR) |
| Half-lightweight (−66 kg) | Yuhei Rokugo (JPN) | Kengo Takaichi (JPN) | Georgii Zantaraia (UKR) |
| Lightweight (−73 kg) | Serhiy Drebot (UKR) | Kiyoshi Uematsu (ESP) | Nikita Khomentovsky (RUS) |
| Lightweight (−73 kg) | Serhiy Drebot (UKR) | Kiyoshi Uematsu (ESP) | Lee Dong-suk (KOR) |
| Half-middleweight (−81 kg) | Kim Jae-bum (KOR) | Jung Won-jun (KOR) | Lee Seung-su (KOR) |
| Half-middleweight (−81 kg) | Kim Jae-bum (KOR) | Jung Won-jun (KOR) | Robin Pacek (SWE) |
| Middleweight (−90 kg) | Gwak Dong-han (KOR) | Ilias Iliadis (GRE) | Quedjau Nhabali (UKR) |
| Middleweight (−90 kg) | Gwak Dong-han (KOR) | Ilias Iliadis (GRE) | Takeshi Sugahara (JPN) |
| Half-heavyweight (−100 kg) | Naidangiin Tüvshinbayar (MGL) | Artem Bloshenko (UKR) | Dmytro Luchyn (UKR) |
| Half-heavyweight (−100 kg) | Naidangiin Tüvshinbayar (MGL) | Artem Bloshenko (UKR) | Martin Pacek (SWE) |
| Heavyweight (+100 kg) | Kim Sung-min (KOR) | Kim Soo-whan (KOR) | Roman Bobikov (RUS) |
| Heavyweight (+100 kg) | Kim Sung-min (KOR) | Kim Soo-whan (KOR) | Stanislav Bondarenko (UKR) |

=== Women's events ===
| Event | Gold | Silver | Bronze |
|---|---|---|---|
| Extra-lightweight (−48 kg) | Emi Yamagishi (JPN) | Jeong Bo-kyeong (KOR) | Maryna Cherniak (UKR) |
| Extra-lightweight (−48 kg) | Emi Yamagishi (JPN) | Jeong Bo-kyeong (KOR) | Julia Figueroa (ESP) |
| Half-lightweight (−52 kg) | Mönkhbaataryn Bundmaa (MGL) | Jung Eun-jung (KOR) | Andreea Chițu (ROU) |
| Half-lightweight (−52 kg) | Mönkhbaataryn Bundmaa (MGL) | Jung Eun-jung (KOR) | Alexandra-Larisa Florian (ROU) |
| Lightweight (−57 kg) | Christa Deguchi (JPN) | Corina Căprioriu (ROU) | Shushana Hevondian (UKR) |
| Lightweight (−57 kg) | Christa Deguchi (JPN) | Corina Căprioriu (ROU) | Jovana Rogić (SRB) |
| Half-middleweight (−63 kg) | Joung Da-woon (KOR) | Kim Seul-gi (KOR) | Anna Bernholm (SWE) |
| Half-middleweight (−63 kg) | Joung Da-woon (KOR) | Kim Seul-gi (KOR) | Bak Ji-yun (KOR) |
| Middleweight (−70 kg) | Hwang Ye-sul (KOR) | Tomoe Ueno (JPN) | Sally Conway (GBR) |
| Middleweight (−70 kg) | Hwang Ye-sul (KOR) | Tomoe Ueno (JPN) | Kim Seong-yeon (KOR) |
| Half-heavyweight (−78 kg) | Jeong Gyeong-mi (KOR) | Viktoriya Turks (UKR) | Choi Mi-young (KOR) |
| Half-heavyweight (−78 kg) | Jeong Gyeong-mi (KOR) | Viktoriya Turks (UKR) | Annika Heise (GER) |
| Heavyweight (+78 kg) | Kim Min-jeong (KOR) | Lee Jung-eun (KOR) | Suzuka Ichihashi (JPN) |
| Heavyweight (+78 kg) | Kim Min-jeong (KOR) | Lee Jung-eun (KOR) | Lee Eun-ju (KOR) |

Source Results

=== Medal table ===
* Host nation (South Korea)

| Rank | Nation | Gold | Silver | Bronze | Total |
|---|---|---|---|---|---|
| 1 | South Korea (KOR)* | 8 | 6 | 8 | 22 |
| 2 | Japan (JPN) | 3 | 2 | 3 | 8 |
| 3 | Mongolia (MGL) | 2 | 0 | 0 | 2 |
| 4 | Ukraine (UKR) | 1 | 2 | 6 | 9 |
| 5 | Romania (ROU) | 0 | 1 | 2 | 3 |
| 6 | Spain (ESP) | 0 | 1 | 1 | 2 |
| 7 | Chinese Taipei (TPE) | 0 | 1 | 0 | 1 |
| 7 | Greece (GRE) | 0 | 1 | 0 | 1 |
| 9 | Sweden (SWE) | 0 | 0 | 3 | 3 |
| 10 | Russia (RUS) | 0 | 0 | 2 | 2 |
| 11 | Germany (GER) | 0 | 0 | 1 | 1 |
| 11 | Great Britain (GBR) | 0 | 0 | 1 | 1 |
| 11 | Serbia (SRB) | 0 | 0 | 1 | 1 |
| Totals (13 entries) | | 14 | 14 | 28 | 56 |
