= Devu Thapa =

Nepalese Olympic judoka

Deva Thapa
Personal information
- Full name: Deva Thapa
- Nationality: Nepali
- Born: Deva Thapa; 7 February 1974 (age 52) Jumla, Nepal
- Height: 1.56 m (5 ft 1 1/2 in)
- Weight: 63 kg (139 lb)

Sport
- Sport: Judo
- Event: 63 kg

Devu Thapa (Nepali: देबु थापा) (born February 7, 1974, in Jumla) is a Nepalese judoka, who competed in the light middleweight category. At age thirty-four, Thapa made her official debut at the 2008 Summer Olympics in Beijing, where she competed in the women's 63 kg class. She lost her first preliminary match to Chinese Taipei's Wang Chin-Fang, who was able to score an automatic ippon at twenty-two seconds.
