= Judo at the 2010 Asian Games – Women's 48 kg =

Judo competition

Women's 48 kg at the 2010 Asian Games
- Venue: Huagong Gymnasium
- Date: 16 November 2010
- Competitors: 16 from 16 nations

Medalists
gold medal	Wu Shugen	China
silver medal	Tomoko Fukumi	Japan
bronze medal	Chung Jung-yeon	South Korea
bronze medal	Baljinnyamyn Bat-Erdene	Mongolia

The women's 48 kilograms (Extra lightweight) competition at the 2010 Asian Games in Guangzhou was held on 16 November at the Huagong Gymnasium.

Wu Shugen of China won the gold medal.

== Schedule ==
All times are China Standard Time (UTC+08:00)

Date	Time	Event
Tuesday, 16 November 2010	10:00	Preliminary
Tuesday, 16 November 2010	10:00	Quarterfinals
Tuesday, 16 November 2010	15:00	Final of repechage
Tuesday, 16 November 2010	15:00	Final of table
Tuesday, 16 November 2010	15:00	Finals

== Results ==
=== Main bracket ===
Preliminary
Tomoko Fukumi (JPN)	101
Leong Siu Pou (MAC)	000
Hwang Ryu-ok (PRK)	100
Saliha Masoud (QAT)	000
Baljinnyamyn Bat-Erdene (MGL)	100
Wanwisa Muenjit (THA)	000
Văn Ngọc Tú (VIE)	100
Farah Al-Salem (IOC)	000
Chung Jung-yeon (KOR)	111
Mayouly Phannouvong (LAO)	000
Nancy Quillotes (PHI)	000
Tombi Devi (IND)	100
Wu Shugen (CHN)	101
Margarita Filippowa (TKM)	000
Alexandra Podryadova (KAZ)	100
Humaira Ashiq (PAK)	000

Quarterfinals
Tomoko Fukumi (JPN)	100
Hwang Ryu-ok (PRK)	000
Baljinnyamyn Bat-Erdene (MGL)	020
Văn Ngọc Tú (VIE)	000
Chung Jung-yeon (KOR)	110
Tombi Devi (IND)	000
Wu Shugen (CHN)	000
Alexandra Podryadova (KAZ)	000

Final of table
Tomoko Fukumi (JPN)	001
Baljinnyamyn Bat-Erdene (MGL)	000
Chung Jung-yeon (KOR)	000
Wu Shugen (CHN)	100

Gold medal
Tomoko Fukumi (JPN)	000
Wu Shugen (CHN)	000

=== Repechage ===
Final of repechage
Hwang Ryu-ok (PRK)	001
Văn Ngọc Tú (VIE)	000
Tombi Devi (IND)	000
Alexandra Podryadova (KAZ)	001

Bronze medals
Hwang Ryu-ok (PRK)	000
Chung Jung-yeon (KOR)	100
Alexandra Podryadova (KAZ)	000
Baljinnyamyn Bat-Erdene (MGL)	100
