= Anna von Harnier =

German judoka (born 1981)

Personal information
- Nationality: German
- Born: 27 January 1981 (age 45)
- Occupation: Judoka
- Height: 1.71 m (5 ft 7 1/2 in)

Sport
- Country: Germany
- Sport: Judo
- Weight class: –63 kg
- Club: SV Böblingen
- Coached by: Michael Bazynski, Daniel Gürschner, Frank Wieneke

Achievements and titles
- Olympic Games: 9th (2008)
- World Champ.: (bronze) (2003)
- European Champ.: (bronze) (2007)
Medal record
Women's judo
Representing Germany
World Championships
Bronze medal – third place	2003 Osaka	–63 kg
European Championships
Bronze medal – third place	2007 Belgrade	–63 kg
European Junior Championships
Bronze medal – third place	2000 Nicosia	–63 kg

Profile at external databases
- IJF: 52716
- JudoInside.com: 239
- Updated on 17 February 2022

Anna von Harnier (born 27 January 1981) is a German judoka, competing in the 63 kg-category. Von Harnier, who is currently ranked at 4th Dan, won bronze medals at the 2003 World Judo Championships and the 2007 European Judo Championships. She competed in the 2004 and 2008 Summer Olympics.
