= Marian Urdabayeva =

Kazakhstani judoka (born 1988)

Personal information
- Born: 3 April 1988 (age 38) Esik, Kazakh SSR, Soviet Union
- Occupation: Judoka

Sport
- Country: Kazakhstan
- Sport: Judo
- Weight class: ‍–‍63 kg, ‍–‍70 kg

Achievements and titles
- Olympic Games: R32 (2016)
- World Champ.: R16 (2015)
- Asian Champ.: (gold) (2016)
Medal record
Women's judo
Representing Kazakhstan
Asian Games
Bronze medal – third place	2014 Incheon	‍–‍63 kg
Asian Championships
Gold medal – first place	2016 Tashkent	‍–‍63 kg
Bronze medal – third place	2007 Kuwait City	‍–‍63 kg
Bronze medal – third place	2015 Kuwait City	‍–‍63 kg
IJF Grand Prix
Silver medal – second place	2017 Antalya	‍–‍63 kg
Bronze medal – third place	2013 Almaty	‍–‍63 kg
Bronze medal – third place	2013 Tashkent	‍–‍63 kg
Bronze medal – third place	2014 Ulaanbaatar	‍–‍63 kg
Asian Junior Championships
Bronze medal – third place	2006 Jeju	‍–‍63 kg
Bronze medal – third place	2007 Hyderabad	‍–‍70 kg
Women's Ju-jitsu
Representing Kazakhstan
World Championships
Bronze medal – third place	2019 Abu Dhabi	Ne-waza −70 kg

Profile at external databases
- IJF: 450
- JudoInside.com: 38633
- Updated on 7 December 2022

Marian Urdabayeva (born 3 April 1988) is a Kazakhstani judoka. She competed at the 2016 Summer Olympics in the women's 63 kg event, in which she was eliminated in the first round by Yang Junxia.
