= Judo at the 2012 Summer Olympics – Women's 63 kg =

Women's 63kg at the Games of the XXX Olympiad
- Venue: ExCeL Exhibition Centre
- Date: 31 July 2012
- Competitors: 24 from 24 nations

Medalists
1st place, gold medalist(s)		Urška Žolnir	Slovenia
2nd place, silver medalist(s)		Xu Lili	China
3rd place, bronze medalist(s)		Yoshie Ueno	Japan
3rd place, bronze medalist(s)		Gévrise Émane	France

Women's 63 kg competition in judo at the 2012 Summer Olympics in London, United Kingdom, took place at ExCeL London.

The gold and silver medals were determined by a single-elimination tournament, with the winner of the final taking gold and the loser receiving silver. Judo events awarded two bronze medals. Quarterfinal losers competed in a repechage match for the right to face a semifinal loser for a bronze medal (that is, the judokas defeated in quarterfinals A and B competed against each other, with the winner of that match facing the semifinal loser from the other half of the bracket).

== Schedule ==
All times are British Summer Time (UTC+1)

Date	Time	Round
Tuesday, 31 July 2012	09:30; 14:00; 16:10	Qualifications; Semifinals; Final

== Results ==
=== Finals ===
Semi-finals
Joung Da-Woon (KOR)	0002
Xu Lili (CHN)	0011
Munkhzaya Tsedevsuren (MGL)	0000
Urška Žolnir (SLO)	1000

Final
Xu Lili (CHN)	0011
Urška Žolnir (SLO)	0100

=== Repechages ===
Repechage		Bronze medal
Yoshie Ueno (JPN)	0010
Elisabeth Willeboordse (NED)	0000	Yoshie Ueno (JPN)	0010
		Munkhzaya Tsedevsuren (MGL)	0002

Repechage		Bronze medal
Gévrise Émane (FRA)	0010
Alice Schlesinger (ISR)	0002	Gévrise Émane (FRA)	0000
		Joung Da-Woon (KOR)	0000

=== Pool A ===
First Round
Y Ueno (JPN)	1000
G Chaudhary (IND)	0000
R Yusubova (AZE)	0111
G Hayytbaeva (TKM)	0000

Second Round
Y Ueno (JPN)	0010
M Mišković (CRO)	0000
D-W Joung (KOR)	1000
R Yusubova (AZE)	0000

Quarterfinals
Y Ueno (JPN)	0002
D-W Joung (KOR)	0020

=== Pool B ===
First Round
L Xu (CHN)	0101
M Silva (BRA)	0001
E Willeboordse (NED)	1100
C Chammas (LIB)	0001

Second Round
L Xu (CHN)	0211
E Gwend (ITA)	0002
E Willeboordse (NED)	1000
S Nébié (BUR)	0001

Quarterfinals
L Xu (CHN)	1000
E Willeboordse (NED)	0001

=== Pool C ===
First Round
G Émane (FRA)	1000
G Howell (GBR)	0000
M Tsedevsuren (MGL)	1100
J Anson (PLW)	0000

Second Round
G Émane (FRA)	0001
Y Abel (CUB)	0001
M Tsedevsuren (MGL)	1000
J Ylinen (FIN)	0000

Quarterfinals
G Émane (FRA)	0001
M Tsedevsuren (MGL)	0001

=== Pool D ===
First Round
U Žolnir (SLO)	1100
C Malzahn (GER)	0000
H Drexler (AUT)	0011
R Zouak (MAR)	0000

Second Round
U Žolnir (SLO)	1000
E García (ECU)	0001
A Schlesinger (ISR)	0002
H Drexler (AUT)	0001

Quarterfinals
U Žolnir (SLO)	1100
A Schlesinger (ISR)	0000
