= 2015 Judo Grand Slam Tyumen =

Judo competition

Judo 2015 Judo Grand Slam Tyumen
- Venue: Athletic Center, Tyumen
- Location: Tyumen, Russia
- Dates: 18–19 July 2015
- Competitors: 311 from 53 nations

Competition at external databases
- Links: IJF • EJU • JudoInside

The 2015 Judo Grand Slam was held in Tyumen, Russia, from 18 to 19 July 2015.

== Medal summary ==
=== Men's events ===
Event	Gold	Silver	Bronze
Extra-lightweight (−60 kg)	Shinji Kido (JPN)	Ashley McKenzie (GBR)	Askhat Telmanov (KAZ)
Extra-lightweight (−60 kg)	Shinji Kido (JPN)	Ashley McKenzie (GBR)	Aibek Imashev (KAZ)
Half-lightweight (−66 kg)	Tomofumi Takajo (JPN)	Gabit Esimbetov (UZB)	Yakub Shamilov (RUS)
Half-lightweight (−66 kg)	Tomofumi Takajo (JPN)	Gabit Esimbetov (UZB)	Dovdony Altansükh (MGL)
Lightweight (−73 kg)	Uali Kurzhev (RUS)	Guillaume Chaine (FRA)	Musa Mogushkov (RUS)
Lightweight (−73 kg)	Uali Kurzhev (RUS)	Guillaume Chaine (FRA)	Igor Wandtke (GER)
Half-middleweight (−81 kg)	Ivan Vorobev (RUS)	Antoine Valois-Fortier (CAN)	Alexander Wieczerzak (GER)
Half-middleweight (−81 kg)	Ivan Vorobev (RUS)	Antoine Valois-Fortier (CAN)	Sven Maresch (GER)
Middleweight (−90 kg)	Mashu Baker (JPN)	Magomed Magomedov (RUS)	Kazbek Zankishiev (RUS)
Middleweight (−90 kg)	Mashu Baker (JPN)	Magomed Magomedov (RUS)	Khusen Khalmurzaev (RUS)
Half-heavyweight (−100 kg)	Martin Pacek (SWE)	Jevgeņijs Borodavko (LAT)	Toma Nikiforov (BEL)
Half-heavyweight (−100 kg)	Martin Pacek (SWE)	Jevgeņijs Borodavko (LAT)	Karl-Richard Frey (GER)
Heavyweight (+100 kg)	Hisayoshi Harasawa (JPN)	Aslan Kambiev (RUS)	Maciej Sarnacki (POL)
Heavyweight (+100 kg)	Hisayoshi Harasawa (JPN)	Aslan Kambiev (RUS)	Soslan Bostanov (RUS)

=== Women's events ===
Event	Gold	Silver	Bronze
Extra-lightweight (−48 kg)	Julia Figueroa (ESP)	Kristina Rumyantseva (RUS)	Irina Dolgova (RUS)
Extra-lightweight (−48 kg)	Julia Figueroa (ESP)	Kristina Rumyantseva (RUS)	Alesya Kuznetsova (RUS)
Half-lightweight (−52 kg)	Joana Ramos (POR)	Ma Yingnan (CHN)	Mareen Kräh (GER)
Half-lightweight (−52 kg)	Joana Ramos (POR)	Ma Yingnan (CHN)	Roni Schwartz (ISR)
Lightweight (−57 kg)	Tsukasa Yoshida (JPN)	Corina Căprioriu (ROU)	Sanne Verhagen (NED)
Lightweight (−57 kg)	Tsukasa Yoshida (JPN)	Corina Căprioriu (ROU)	Catherine Beauchemin-Pinard (CAN)
Half-middleweight (−63 kg)	Tsedevsürengiin Mönkhzayaa (MGL)	Tsend-Ayuushiin Tserennadmid (MGL)	Alice Schlesinger (ISR)
Half-middleweight (−63 kg)	Tsedevsürengiin Mönkhzayaa (MGL)	Tsend-Ayuushiin Tserennadmid (MGL)	Yarden Gerbi (ISR)
Middleweight (−70 kg)	Haruka Tachimoto (JPN)	Linda Bolder (ISR)	Szaundra Diedrich (GER)
Middleweight (−70 kg)	Haruka Tachimoto (JPN)	Linda Bolder (ISR)	Kelita Zupancic (CAN)
Half-heavyweight (−78 kg)	Guusje Steenhuis (NED)	Ruika Sato (JPN)	Luise Malzahn (GER)
Half-heavyweight (−78 kg)	Guusje Steenhuis (NED)	Ruika Sato (JPN)	Shori Hamada (JPN)
Heavyweight (+78 kg)	Ma Sisi (CHN)	Nami Inamori (JPN)	Jasmin Grabowski (GER)
Heavyweight (+78 kg)	Ma Sisi (CHN)	Nami Inamori (JPN)	Yu Song (CHN)

Source Results

=== Medal table ===
* Host nation (Russia)

Rank	Nation	Gold	Silver	Bronze	Total
1	Japan (JPN)	6	2	1	9
2	Russia (RUS)*	2	3	7	12
3	China (CHN)	1	1	1	3
3	Mongolia (MGL)	1	1	1	3
5	Netherlands (NED)	1	0	1	2
6	Portugal (POR)	1	0	0	1
6	Spain (ESP)	1	0	0	1
6	Sweden (SWE)	1	0	0	1
9	Israel (ISR)	0	1	3	4
10	Canada (CAN)	0	1	2	3
11	France (FRA)	0	1	0	1
11	Great Britain (GBR)	0	1	0	1
11	Latvia (LAT)	0	1	0	1
11	Romania (ROU)	0	1	0	1
11	Uzbekistan (UZB)	0	1	0	1
16	Germany (GER)	0	0	8	8
17	Kazakhstan (KAZ)	0	0	2	2
18	Belgium (BEL)	0	0	1	1
18	Poland (POL)	0	0	1	1
Totals (19 entries)		14	14	28	56
