= 2011 Judo Grand Prix Amsterdam =

Judo competition

Judo 2011 Judo Grand Prix Amsterdam
- Location: Amsterdam, Netherlands
- Dates: 19–20 November 2011
- Competitors: 401 from 63 nations

Competition at external databases
- Links: IJF • EJU • JudoInside

The 2011 Judo Grand Prix Amsterdam was held in Amsterdam, Netherlands from 19 to 20 November 2011.

== Medal summary ==
=== Men's events ===
Event	Gold	Silver	Bronze
Extra-lightweight (−60 kg)	Davaadorjiin Tömörkhüleg (MGL)	Amiran Papinashvili (GEO)	Boldbaatar Chimed-Yondon (MGL)
Extra-lightweight (−60 kg)	Davaadorjiin Tömörkhüleg (MGL)	Amiran Papinashvili (GEO)	Beslan Mudranov (RUS)
Half-lightweight (−66 kg)	Rok Drakšič (SLO)	Sanjaasürengiin Miyaaragchaa (MGL)	Khashbaataryn Tsagaanbaatar (MGL)
Half-lightweight (−66 kg)	Rok Drakšič (SLO)	Sanjaasürengiin Miyaaragchaa (MGL)	Junpei Morishita (JPN)
Lightweight (−73 kg)	Dex Elmont (NED)	Mansur Isaev (RUS)	Ugo Legrand (FRA)
Lightweight (−73 kg)	Dex Elmont (NED)	Mansur Isaev (RUS)	Kiyoshi Uematsu (ESP)
Half-middleweight (−81 kg)	Alain Schmitt (FRA)	Aljaž Sedej (SLO)	Safouane Attaf (MAR)
Half-middleweight (−81 kg)	Alain Schmitt (FRA)	Aljaž Sedej (SLO)	Ivan Nifontov (RUS)
Middleweight (−90 kg)	Tiago Camilo (BRA)	Kirill Voprosov (RUS)	David Alarza (ESP)
Middleweight (−90 kg)	Tiago Camilo (BRA)	Kirill Voprosov (RUS)	Marcus Nyman (SWE)
Half-heavyweight (−100 kg)	Henk Grol (NED)	Maxim Rakov (KAZ)	Ramadan Darwish (EGY)
Half-heavyweight (−100 kg)	Henk Grol (NED)	Maxim Rakov (KAZ)	Or Sasson (ISR)
Heavyweight (+100 kg)	Andreas Tölzer (GER)	Marius Paškevičius (LTU)	Barna Bor (HUN)
Heavyweight (+100 kg)	Andreas Tölzer (GER)	Marius Paškevičius (LTU)	Kazuhiko Takahashi (JPN)

=== Women's events ===
Event	Gold	Silver	Bronze
Extra-lightweight (−48 kg)	Charline Van Snick (BEL)	Birgit Ente (NED)	Alina Dumitru (ROU)
Extra-lightweight (−48 kg)	Charline Van Snick (BEL)	Birgit Ente (NED)	Wu Shugen (CHN)
Half-lightweight (−52 kg)	Soraya Haddad (ALG)	Yuki Hashimoto (JPN)	Sophie Cox (GBR)
Half-lightweight (−52 kg)	Soraya Haddad (ALG)	Yuki Hashimoto (JPN)	Majlinda Kelmendi (KOS)
Lightweight (−57 kg)	Ioulietta Boukouvala (GRE)	Ketleyn Quadros (BRA)	Megumi Ishikawa (JPN)
Lightweight (−57 kg)	Ioulietta Boukouvala (GRE)	Ketleyn Quadros (BRA)	Sarah Loko (FRA)
Half-middleweight (−63 kg)	Anicka van Emden (NED)	Elisabeth Willeboordse (NED)	Tsedevsürengiin Mönkhzayaa (MGL)
Half-middleweight (−63 kg)	Anicka van Emden (NED)	Elisabeth Willeboordse (NED)	Xu Lili (CHN)
Middleweight (−70 kg)	Edith Bosch (NED)	Nataliya Smal (UKR)	Yuri Alvear (COL)
Middleweight (−70 kg)	Edith Bosch (NED)	Nataliya Smal (UKR)	Yoko Ono (JPN)
Half-heavyweight (−78 kg)	Pürevjargalyn Lkhamdegd (MGL)	Heide Wollert (GER)	Luise Malzahn (GER)
Half-heavyweight (−78 kg)	Pürevjargalyn Lkhamdegd (MGL)	Heide Wollert (GER)	Tomomi Okamura (JPN)
Heavyweight (+78 kg)	Maria Suelen Altheman (BRA)	Qin Qian (CHN)	Karina Bryant (GBR)
Heavyweight (+78 kg)	Maria Suelen Altheman (BRA)	Qin Qian (CHN)	Lucija Polavder (SLO)

Source Results

=== Medal table ===
* Host nation (Netherlands)

Rank	Nation	Gold	Silver	Bronze	Total
1	Netherlands (NED)*	4	2	0	6
2	Mongolia (MGL)	2	1	3	6
3	Brazil (BRA)	2	1	0	3
4	Germany (GER)	1	1	1	3
4	Slovenia (SLO)	1	1	1	3
6	France (FRA)	1	0	2	3
7	Algeria (ALG)	1	0	0	1
7	Belgium (BEL)	1	0	0	1
7	Greece (GRE)	1	0	0	1
10	Russia (RUS)	0	2	2	4
11	Japan (JPN)	0	1	5	6
12	China (CHN)	0	1	2	3
13	Georgia (GEO)	0	1	0	1
13	Kazakhstan (KAZ)	0	1	0	1
13	Lithuania (LTU)	0	1	0	1
13	Ukraine (UKR)	0	1	0	1
17	Great Britain (GBR)	0	0	2	2
17	Spain (ESP)	0	0	2	2
19	Colombia (COL)	0	0	1	1
19	Egypt (EGY)	0	0	1	1
19	Hungary (HUN)	0	0	1	1
19	Israel (ISR)	0	0	1	1
19	Kosovo (KOS)	0	0	1	1
19	Morocco (MAR)	0	0	1	1
19	Romania (ROU)	0	0	1	1
19	Sweden (SWE)	0	0	1	1
Totals (26 entries)		14	14	28	56
