= 2012 Judo Grand Slam Moscow =

Judo competition

Judo 2012 Judo Grand Slam Moscow
- Location: Moscow, Russia
- Dates: 26–27 May 2012
- Competitors: 163 from 34 nations

Competition at external databases
- Links: IJF • JudoInside

The 2012 Judo Grand Slam Moscow was held in Moscow, Russia, from 26 to 27 May 2012.

== Medal summary ==
=== Men's events ===
Event	Gold	Silver	Bronze
Extra-lightweight (−60 kg)	Naohisa Takato (JPN)	Davaadorjiin Tömörkhüleg (MGL)	Ganbatyn Boldbaatar (MGL)
Extra-lightweight (−60 kg)	Naohisa Takato (JPN)	Davaadorjiin Tömörkhüleg (MGL)	Ilgar Mushkiyev (AZE)
Half-lightweight (−66 kg)	Mirzohid Farmonov (UZB)	Tomofumi Takajo (JPN)	Kamal Khan-Magomedov (RUS)
Half-lightweight (−66 kg)	Mirzohid Farmonov (UZB)	Tomofumi Takajo (JPN)	Sanjaasürengiin Miyaaragchaa (MGL)
Lightweight (−73 kg)	Yuki Nishiyama (JPN)	Navruz Jurakobilov (UZB)	Sainjargalyn Nyam-Ochir (MGL)
Lightweight (−73 kg)	Yuki Nishiyama (JPN)	Navruz Jurakobilov (UZB)	Mirali Sharipov (UZB)
Half-middleweight (−81 kg)	Murat Khabachirov (RUS)	Yakhyo Imamov (UZB)	Tuvshinjargal Gan (MGL)
Half-middleweight (−81 kg)	Murat Khabachirov (RUS)	Yakhyo Imamov (UZB)	Tomislav Marijanović (CRO)
Middleweight (−90 kg)	Ilias Iliadis (GRE)	Grigorii Sulemin (RUS)	Magomed Magomedov (RUS)
Middleweight (−90 kg)	Ilias Iliadis (GRE)	Grigorii Sulemin (RUS)	Milan Randl (SVK)
Half-heavyweight (−100 kg)	Ramziddin Sayidov (UZB)	Battulgyn Temüülen (MGL)	Ramadan Darwish (EGY)
Half-heavyweight (−100 kg)	Ramziddin Sayidov (UZB)	Battulgyn Temüülen (MGL)	Sergei Samoilovich (RUS)
Heavyweight (+100 kg)	Abdullo Tangriev (UZB)	Soslan Bostanov (RUS)	Nodar Metreveli (GEO)
Heavyweight (+100 kg)	Abdullo Tangriev (UZB)	Soslan Bostanov (RUS)	Renat Saidov (RUS)

=== Women's events ===
Event	Gold	Silver	Bronze
Extra-lightweight (−48 kg)	Sarah Menezes (BRA)	Alina Dumitru (ROU)	Kristina Rumyantseva (RUS)
Extra-lightweight (−48 kg)	Sarah Menezes (BRA)	Alina Dumitru (ROU)	Charline Van Snick (BEL)
Half-lightweight (−52 kg)	Érika Miranda (BRA)	Ilse Heylen (BEL)	Jacqueline Lisson (GER)
Half-lightweight (−52 kg)	Érika Miranda (BRA)	Ilse Heylen (BEL)	Eleudis Valentim (BRA)
Lightweight (−57 kg)	Corina Căprioriu (ROU)	Zhanna Stankevich (ARM)	Jovana Rogić (SRB)
Lightweight (−57 kg)	Corina Căprioriu (ROU)	Zhanna Stankevich (ARM)	Ekaterina Valkova (RUS)
Half-middleweight (−63 kg)	Alice Schlesinger (ISR)	Martyna Trajdos (GER)	Hilde Drexler (AUT)
Half-middleweight (−63 kg)	Alice Schlesinger (ISR)	Martyna Trajdos (GER)	Tsedevsürengiin Mönkhzayaa (MGL)
Middleweight (−70 kg)	Maria Portela (BRA)	Naranjargal Tsend-Ayush (MGL)	Raša Sraka (SLO)
Middleweight (−70 kg)	Maria Portela (BRA)	Naranjargal Tsend-Ayush (MGL)	Kelita Zupancic (CAN)
Half-heavyweight (−78 kg)	Amy Cotton (CAN)	Pürevjargalyn Lkhamdegd (MGL)	Luise Malzahn (GER)
Half-heavyweight (−78 kg)	Amy Cotton (CAN)	Pürevjargalyn Lkhamdegd (MGL)	Vera Moskalyuk (RUS)
Heavyweight (+78 kg)	Maria Suelen Altheman (BRA)	Melissa Mojica (PUR)	Polina Belousova (RUS)
Heavyweight (+78 kg)	Maria Suelen Altheman (BRA)	Melissa Mojica (PUR)	Mariya Shekerova (RUS)

Source Results

=== Medal table ===
* Host nation (Russia)

Rank	Nation	Gold	Silver	Bronze	Total
1	Brazil (BRA)	4	0	1	5
2	Uzbekistan (UZB)	3	2	1	6
3	Japan (JPN)	2	1	0	3
4	Russia (RUS)*	1	2	9	12
5	Romania (ROU)	1	1	0	2
6	Canada (CAN)	1	0	1	2
7	Greece (GRE)	1	0	0	1
7	Israel (ISR)	1	0	0	1
9	Mongolia (MGL)	0	4	5	9
10	Germany (GER)	0	1	2	3
11	Belgium (BEL)	0	1	1	2
12	Armenia (ARM)	0	1	0	1
12	Puerto Rico (PUR)	0	1	0	1
14	Austria (AUT)	0	0	1	1
14	Azerbaijan (AZE)	0	0	1	1
14	Croatia (CRO)	0	0	1	1
14	Egypt (EGY)	0	0	1	1
14	Georgia (GEO)	0	0	1	1
14	Serbia (SRB)	0	0	1	1
14	Slovakia (SVK)	0	0	1	1
14	Slovenia (SLO)	0	0	1	1
Totals (21 entries)		14	14	28	56
