= Won Ok-im =

North Korean judoka (born 1986)

Personal information
- Born: 6 November 1986 (age 39)
- Occupation: Judoka

Korean name
- Hangul: 원옥임
- RR: Won Okim
- MR: Wŏn Ogim

Sport
- Country: North Korea
- Sport: Judo
- Weight class: –63 kg

Achievements and titles
- Olympic Games: (bronze) (2008)
- Asian Champ.: (bronze) (2006, 2008)
Medal record
Women's judo
Representing North Korea
Olympic Games
Bronze medal – third place	2008 Beijing	‍–‍63 kg
Asian Games
Bronze medal – third place	2006 Doha	‍–‍63 kg
Asian Championships
Bronze medal – third place	2008 Jeju	‍–‍63 kg
East Asian Games
Bronze medal – third place	2009 Hong Kong	‍–‍63 kg
Asian Junior Championships
Bronze medal – third place	2005 Beirut	‍–‍70 kg

Profile at external databases
- IJF: 6098
- JudoInside.com: 40919
- Updated on 30 May 2023

Won Ok-im (Korean pronunciation: [wʌn.o.ɡim]; born 6 November 1986) is a North Korean judoka.

She won a bronze medal in the half-middleweight category (‍–‍63 kg) at the 2006 Asian Games, having defeated Tümen-Odyn Battögs of Mongolia in the bronze medal match. Won also won a bronze medal at 2008 Olympic Games.

She currently resides in Pyongyang.
