= 2011 Judo Grand Prix Düsseldorf =

Judo competition

Judo 2011 Judo Grand Prix Düsseldorf
- Location: Düsseldorf, Germany
- Dates: 19–20 February 2011
- Competitors: 497 from 68 nations

Competition at external databases
- Links: IJF • EJU • JudoInside

The 2011 Judo Grand Prix Düsseldorf was held in Düsseldorf, Germany from 19 to 20 February 2011.

== Medal summary ==
=== Men's events ===
Event	Gold	Silver	Bronze
Extra-lightweight (−60 kg)	Hiroaki Hiraoka (JPN)	Jin-Min Jang (KOR)	Ganbatyn Boldbaatar (MGL)
Extra-lightweight (−60 kg)	Hiroaki Hiraoka (JPN)	Jin-Min Jang (KOR)	Elio Verde (ITA)
Half-lightweight (−66 kg)	Masaaki Fukuoka (JPN)	Cho Jun-ho (KOR)	Serhiy Drebot (UKR)
Half-lightweight (−66 kg)	Masaaki Fukuoka (JPN)	Cho Jun-ho (KOR)	Mikhail Pulyaev (RUS)
Lightweight (−73 kg)	Dirk Van Tichelt (BEL)	Kiyoshi Uematsu (ESP)	Yuki Nishiyama (JPN)
Lightweight (−73 kg)	Dirk Van Tichelt (BEL)	Kiyoshi Uematsu (ESP)	Soso Palelashvili (ISR)
Half-middleweight (−81 kg)	Travis Stevens (USA)	Murat Khabachirov (RUS)	Elnur Mammadli (AZE)
Half-middleweight (−81 kg)	Travis Stevens (USA)	Murat Khabachirov (RUS)	Arsen Pshmakhov (RUS)
Middleweight (−90 kg)	Marcus Nyman (SWE)	Romain Buffet (FRA)	Masashi Nishiyama (JPN)
Middleweight (−90 kg)	Marcus Nyman (SWE)	Romain Buffet (FRA)	Vadym Synyavsky (UKR)
Half-heavyweight (−100 kg)	Maxim Rakov (KAZ)	Dimitri Peters (GER)	Jevgeņijs Borodavko (LAT)
Half-heavyweight (−100 kg)	Maxim Rakov (KAZ)	Dimitri Peters (GER)	Lukáš Krpálek (CZE)
Heavyweight (+100 kg)	Andreas Tölzer (GER)	Keiji Suzuki (JPN)	Rafael Silva (BRA)
Heavyweight (+100 kg)	Andreas Tölzer (GER)	Keiji Suzuki (JPN)	Robert Zimmermann (GER)

=== Women's events ===
Event	Gold	Silver	Bronze
Extra-lightweight (−48 kg)	Tomoko Fukumi (JPN)	Charline Van Snick (BEL)	Alina Dumitru (ROU)
Extra-lightweight (−48 kg)	Tomoko Fukumi (JPN)	Charline Van Snick (BEL)	Wu Shugen (CHN)
Half-lightweight (−52 kg)	Yuka Nishida (JPN)	Majlinda Kelmendi (KOS)	Ana Carrascosa (ESP)
Half-lightweight (−52 kg)	Yuka Nishida (JPN)	Majlinda Kelmendi (KOS)	He Hongmei (CHN)
Lightweight (−57 kg)	Rafaela Silva (BRA)	Kaori Matsumoto (JPN)	Corina Căprioriu (ROU)
Lightweight (−57 kg)	Rafaela Silva (BRA)	Kaori Matsumoto (JPN)	Giulia Quintavalle (ITA)
Half-middleweight (−63 kg)	Yoshie Ueno (JPN)	Alice Schlesinger (ISR)	Tsedevsürengiin Mönkhzayaa (MGL)
Half-middleweight (−63 kg)	Yoshie Ueno (JPN)	Alice Schlesinger (ISR)	Elisabeth Willeboordse (NED)
Middleweight (−70 kg)	Chen Fei (CHN)	Iljana Marzok (GER)	Yuri Alvear (COL)
Middleweight (−70 kg)	Chen Fei (CHN)	Iljana Marzok (GER)	Juliane Robra (SUI)
Half-heavyweight (−78 kg)	Pürevjargalyn Lkhamdegd (MGL)	Heide Wollert (GER)	Marhinde Verkerk (NED)
Half-heavyweight (−78 kg)	Pürevjargalyn Lkhamdegd (MGL)	Heide Wollert (GER)	Yang Xiuli (CHN)
Heavyweight (+78 kg)	Mika Sugimoto (JPN)	Lucija Polavder (SLO)	Anne-Sophie Mondière (FRA)
Heavyweight (+78 kg)	Mika Sugimoto (JPN)	Lucija Polavder (SLO)	Qin Qian (CHN)

Source Results

=== Medal table ===
* Host nation (Germany)

Rank	Nation	Gold	Silver	Bronze	Total
1	Japan (JPN)	6	2	2	10
2	Germany (GER)*	1	3	1	5
3	Belgium (BEL)	1	1	0	2
4	China (CHN)	1	0	4	5
5	Mongolia (MGL)	1	0	2	3
6	Brazil (BRA)	1	0	1	2
7	Kazakhstan (KAZ)	1	0	0	1
7	Sweden (SWE)	1	0	0	1
7	United States (USA)	1	0	0	1
10	South Korea (KOR)	0	2	0	2
11	Russia (RUS)	0	1	2	3
12	France (FRA)	0	1	1	2
12	Israel (ISR)	0	1	1	2
12	Spain (ESP)	0	1	1	2
15	Kosovo (KOS)	0	1	0	1
15	Slovenia (SLO)	0	1	0	1
17	Italy (ITA)	0	0	2	2
17	Netherlands (NED)	0	0	2	2
17	Romania (ROU)	0	0	2	2
17	Ukraine (UKR)	0	0	2	2
21	Azerbaijan (AZE)	0	0	1	1
21	Colombia (COL)	0	0	1	1
21	Czech Republic (CZE)	0	0	1	1
21	Latvia (LAT)	0	0	1	1
21	Switzerland (SUI)	0	0	1	1
Totals (25 entries)		14	14	28	56
