= Judo at the 2014 Asian Games – Women's +78 kg =

Judo competition

Women's +78 kg at the 2014 Asian Games
- Venue: Dowon Gymnasium
- Date: 22 September 2014
- Competitors: 10 from 10 nations

Medalists
| gold medal | Ma Sisi | China |
| silver medal | Nami Inamori | Japan |
| bronze medal | Thonthan Satjadet | Thailand |
| bronze medal | Kim Eun-kyeong | South Korea |

The women's +78 kilograms (Heavyweight) competition at the 2014 Asian Games in Incheon was held on 22 September at the Dowon Gymnasium.

Ma Sisi of China won the gold medal.

== Schedule ==
All times are Korea Standard Time (UTC+09:00)

| Date | Time | Event |
|---|---|---|
| Monday, 22 September 2014 | 14:00 | Elimination round of 16 |
| Monday, 22 September 2014 | 14:00 | Quarterfinals |
| Monday, 22 September 2014 | 14:00 | Semifinals |
| Monday, 22 September 2014 | 14:00 | Final of repechage |
| Monday, 22 September 2014 | 19:00 | Finals |

== Results ==
=== Main bracket ===
Elimination round of 16
Sunita Bohara (NEP) | 000
Zarina Raifova (KAZ) | 100
Nagira Sarbashova (KGZ) | 100
Khin Myo Thu (MYA) | 000

Quarterfinals
Kim Eun-kyeong (KOR) | 101
Zarina Raifova (KAZ) | 000
Thonthan Satjadet (THA) | 000
Nami Inamori (JPN) | 101
Ma Sisi (CHN) | 111
Nagira Sarbashova (KGZ) | 000
Odkhüügiin Javzmaa (MGL) | 101
Rajwinder Kaur (IND) | 000

Semifinals
Kim Eun-kyeong (KOR) | 000
Nami Inamori (JPN) | 100
Ma Sisi (CHN) | 110
Odkhüügiin Javzmaa (MGL) | 000

Gold medal contest
Nami Inamori (JPN) | 000
Ma Sisi (CHN) | 001

=== Repechage ===
Final of repechage
Zarina Raifova (KAZ) | 000
Thonthan Satjadet (THA) | 100
Nagira Sarbashova (KGZ) | 111
Rajwinder Kaur (IND) | 000

Bronze medal contests
Thonthan Satjadet (THA) | 100
Odkhüügiin Javzmaa (MGL) | 000
Nagira Sarbashova (KGZ) | 002
Kim Eun-kyeong (KOR) | 103
