= Ma Sisi =

Chinese judoka (born 1988)

Personal information
- Born: 26 June 1988 (age 38)
- Occupation: Judoka

Sport
- Country: China
- Sport: Judo
- Weight class: +78 kg

Achievements and titles
- World Champ.: 5th (2015)
- Asian Champ.: (gold) (2014)
Medal record
Women's judo
Representing China
Asian Games
| Gold medal – first place | 2014 Incheon | +78 kg |
| Bronze medal – third place | 2014 Incheon | Women's team |
World Masters
| Silver medal – second place | 2016 Guadalajara | +78 kg |
IJF Grand Slam
| Gold medal – first place | 2015 Tyumen | +78 kg |
| Gold medal – first place | 2015 Abu Dhabi | +78 kg |
| Silver medal – second place | 2016 Paris | +78 kg |
IJF Grand Prix
| Gold medal – first place | 2014 Havana | +78 kg |
| Gold medal – first place | 2015 Samsun | +78 kg |
| Silver medal – second place | 2013 Qingdao | +78 kg |
| Silver medal – second place | 2015 Tashkent | +78 kg |
| Silver medal – second place | 2015 Qingdao | +78 kg |
| Silver medal – second place | 2016 Budapest | +78 kg |
| Silver medal – second place | 2016 Qingdao | +78 kg |
| Bronze medal – third place | 2015 Ulaanbaatar | +78 kg |
| Bronze medal – third place | 2016 Tbilisi | +78 kg |

Profile at external databases
- IJF: 15083
- JudoInside.com: 59988
- Updated on 20 November 2022

Ma Sisi (born 26 June 1988) is a Chinese judoka.

== Career ==
Ma is the silver medalist of the 2016 Judo Grand Prix Qingdao in the +78 kg category.
