= Bak Ji-yun =

South Korean judoka (born 1992)

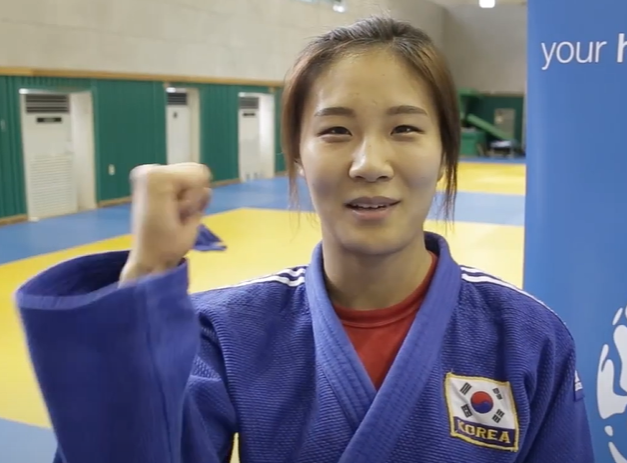
- Bak in 2016

Personal information
- Born: 21 September 1992 (age 33)
- Occupation: Judoka

Sport
- Country: South Korea
- Sport: Judo
- Weight class: ‍–‍63 kg

Achievements and titles
- Olympic Games: R32 (2016)
- World Champ.: R16 (2015)
- Asian Champ.: (bronze) (2015)
Medal record
Women's judo
Representing South Korea
Asian Games
Silver medal – second place	2014 Incheon	Women's team
Asian Championships
Bronze medal – third place	2015 Kuwait City	‍–‍63 kg
IJF Grand Prix
Bronze medal – third place	2013 Jeju	‍–‍63 kg
Bronze medal – third place	2014 Jeju	‍–‍63 kg
Bronze medal – third place	2015 Qingdao	‍–‍63 kg
Summer Universiade
Silver medal – second place	2015 Gwangju	‍–‍63 kg

Profile at external databases
- IJF: 15225
- JudoInside.com: 97775
- Updated on 16 December 2022

Bak Ji-yun (Korean: 박지윤, born 21 September 1992) is a South Korean judoka. She competed at the 2016 Summer Olympics in the women's 63 kg event, in which she was eliminated in the first round by Alice Schlesinger.
