= Kong Ja-young =

South Korean judoka (born 1985)

Personal information
- Born: 30 July 1985 (age 41) Seoul, South Korea
- Occupation: Judoka
- Height: 1.65 m (5 ft 5 in)
- Weight: 65 kg (143 lb)

Sport
- Country: South Korea
- Sport: Judo
- Weight class: ‍–‍63 kg
- Club: Pohang City Hall

Achievements and titles
- Olympic Games: 9th (2008)
- World Champ.: 7th (2007, 2009)
- Asian Champ.: (silver) (2006, 2008)
Medal record
Women's judo
Representing South Korea
Asian Games
Silver medal – second place	2006 Doha	‍–‍63 kg
Bronze medal – third place	2010 Guangzhou	‍–‍63 kg
Asian Championships
Silver medal – second place	2008 Jeju	‍–‍63 kg
World Masters
Silver medal – second place	2010 Suwon	‍–‍63 kg

Profile at external databases
- IJF: 66
- JudoInside.com: 36318
- Updated on 20 November 2022

Kong Ja-young (Korean: 공자영; born 30 July 1985 in Seoul, South Korea) is a South Korean Judoka. She is a graduate of Yong In University.

Kong won a silver medal at the 2006 Asian Games and competed in the 2008 Summer Olympics. She went on to win a bronze medal at the 2010 Guangzhou Asian Games and competed in the 2011 World Championships.

As of 2016, Kong works as a policewoman in the Seoul Metropolitan Police Agency, serving Gangseo District.
