= Gideon van Zyl =

South African judoka

Personal information
- Born: 24 November 1989 (age 36)
- Occupation: Judoka

Sport
- Sport: Judo

Profile at external databases
- JudoInside.com: 43797

Gideon van Zyl (born 24 November 1989 in Johannesburg) is a South African judoka. He competed in the men's 73 kg event at the 2012 Summer Olympics and was eliminated by Rustam Orujov in the second round.
