= Thonthan Satjadet =

Thai judoka (born 1993)

Personal information
- Born: 1 November 1993 (age 32)
- Occupation: Judoka

Sport
- Country: Thailand
- Sport: Judo
Medal record
Women's judo
Representing Thailand
Asian Games
Bronze medal – third place	2014 Incheon	+78 kg
Southeast Asian Games
Gold medal – first place	2019 Philippines	+78 kg

Profile at external databases
- IJF: 12498
- JudoInside.com: 57411
- Updated on 24 January 2022

Thonthan Satjadet (born 1 November 1993) is a Thai judoka. She won the gold medal in the women's +78 kg event at the 2019 Southeast Asian Games held in the Philippines.

She also won one of the bronze medals in the women's +78 kg event at the 2014 Asian Games held in Incheon, South Korea. She also competed in the women's team event.
