= Israelis in the United Kingdom =

Israeli citizens and nationals or descendants in Britain

Total population
- 11,892 UK residents born in Israel (2001 Census)

Regions with significant populations
- London

Languages
- British English, Hebrew, Arabic

Religion
- predominantly Judaism minority Islam, Christianity

Israelis in the United Kingdom or Israeli Britons are citizens or residents of the United Kingdom who were originally from Israel or are of Israeli descent.

== Demographics ==
In 2001 Israel was the 68th most common birthplace for British residents; some 11,892 people born in Israel lived in the UK. It is unknown how many people born in the UK are of Israeli descent, as that was not listed as a separate ethnic group in the 2001 Census. The majority of Israelis in the UK live in London and, in particular, the densely populated Jewish area of Golders Green. The vast majority of Israeli Britons are Jewish. The most common languages amongst the Israeli British community are Hebrew, Arabic and British English.

== Contemporary issues ==
Some Israeli-Jewish immigrants in Europe complain that they feel excluded from the rest of the Jewish community. Only 2% of those in Britain and France who responded to a 2008 survey said that they feel part of the local Jewish community. Despite many Israelis claiming not to feel connected to other Jewish groups in the country, around 33% of those interviewed said they felt attached to their Jewish identity more than to their Israeli identity, with 11% saying they identified less as Jews. Jewish Telegraphic Agency reported in 2008 that the Israeli community in the UK had little involvement in the local Jewish community, though Israeli immigrants often chose to live in predominantly Jewish areas. Israelis in the UK often complain of being discouraged by the perceived "frosty" attitude of British Jews towards them, but at the same time many Israelis in Britain are indifferent to the local Jewish community and reluctant to become part of it.

== Media ==
Alondon is London's main Hebrew-language magazine that caters primarily to the British Israeli community.

== Notable people ==
One of the most notable British people of Israeli descent is Sacha Baron Cohen, an English comedian and actor whose mother came from Israel. Others include English magician Uri Geller and Scottish professional wrestler Noam Dar, both of whom were born in Israel and later moved to the UK.

In 2008, six Israelis were counted amongst the top 50 richest people in the UK, according to the Sunday Times Rich List—equal to the number of people born in the UK who made the top 50. They include Lev Leviev, Benny Steinmetz, and brothers Eddie and Saul Zakai.

== See also ==
- Israel-United Kingdom relations
- British Israelism
- Israeli diaspora
- Yerida
- History of the Jews in the United Kingdom
