= Rizlen Zouak =

French-Moroccan judoka (born 1986)

- Born: 14 May 1986 (age 40); Beaune, France
- Nationality: (France) French (Morocco) Moroccan
- Style: Judo
- Years active: 2012 – present

Mixed martial arts record
- Total: 12
- Wins: 7
- By knockout: 3
- By decision: 4
- Losses: 5
- By knockout: 2
- By submission: 1
- By decision: 2

Other information
- Mixed martial arts record from Sherdog
- Judo career
- Weight class: ‍–‍63 kg
- Rank: Black belt

Judo achievements and titles
- Olympic Games: R32 (2012, 2016)
- World Champ.: R16 (2015)
- African Champ.: (gold) (2012, 2013, 2015)
Medal record
Women's judo
Representing Morocco
African Championships
Gold medal – first place	2012 Agadir	‍–‍63 kg
Gold medal – first place	2013 Maputo	‍–‍63 kg
Gold medal – first place	2015 Libreville	‍–‍63 kg
Silver medal – second place	2016 Tunis	‍–‍63 kg
Bronze medal – third place	2011 Dakar	‍–‍63 kg
Bronze medal – third place	2014 Port Louis	‍–‍63 kg
IJF Grand Prix
Silver medal – second place	2014 Samsun	‍–‍63 kg
Mediterranean Games
Bronze medal – third place	2013 Mersin	‍–‍63 kg
Representing France
European U23 Championships
Bronze medal – third place	2008 Zagreb	‍–‍63 kg

Profile at external judo databases
- IJF: 7009, 4200
- JudoInside.com: 26514
- Last updated on: 29 October 2024

Rizlen Zouak (born 14 May 1986, Beaune, France) is a French-Moroccan judoka and mixed martial arts fighter. At the 2012 Summer Olympics she competed in the women's 63 kg, but was defeated in the first round. On 24 June 2017, Zouak made her debut in MMA against Leah McCourt at Cage Warriors 85 for the British MMA organisation Cage Warriors. She won the fight by TKO in the second round.

== Mixed martial arts record ==
Professional record breakdown
12 matches	7 wins	5 losses
By knockout	3	2
By submission	0	1
By decision	4	2
Draws	0	
No contests	0	

Res.	Record	Opponent	Method	Event	Date	Round	Time	Location	Notes
Win	7–5	Iony Razafiarison	Decision (unanimous)	Ares FC 9	3 November 2022	3	5:00	Paris, France	
Loss	6–5	Melissa Dixon	Decision (unanimous)	Ares FC 7	25 June 2022	3	5:00	Paris, France	Featherweight bout.
Win	6–4	Flordinice Muniz	Decision (unanimous)	Ares FC 4	10 March 2022	3	5:00	Paris, France	
Loss	5–4	Gisele Moreira	TKO (body kick and punches)	Ares FC 2	11 December 2021	2	2:57	Paris, France	
Win	5–3	Jenny Gotti	Decision (unanimous)	Mixed Martial Arts Grand Prix 4	14 October 2021	3	5:00	Paris, France	Flyweight bout.
Loss	4–3	Marta Waliczek	Decision (unanimous)	OKTAGON 25	19 June 2021	3	5:00	Brno, Czech Republic	
Win	4–2	Senna van der Veerdonk	Decision (unanimous)	FFA Challenge 1	10 April 2021	3	5:00	Paris, France	
Loss	3–2	Lucia Szabová	Submission (armbar)	OKTAGON 21	30 January 2021	2	1:25	Brno, Czech Republic	
Loss	3–1	Amanda Lino	TKO (punches)	EFC Worldwide 70	26 May 2018	3	3:11	Durban, South Africa	For the EFC Women's Flyweight Championship.
Win	3–0	Jacqualine T. Feddersen	TKO (punches)	EFC Worldwide 66	16 December 2017	1	0:27	Pretoria, South Africa	Bantamweight debut.
Win	2–0	Bunmi Ojewole	TKO (punches)	EFC Worldwide 62	19 August 2017	2	1:08	Johannesburg, South Africa	Catchweight (139 lb) bout.
Win	1–0	Leah McCourt	TKO (punches)	Cage Warriors 85	24 June 2017	2	3:46	Bournemouth, England	Featherweight debut.
