= Xu Yuhua (judoka) =

Chinese judoka (born 1983)

Personal information
- Born: 2 March 1983 (age 43)
- Occupation: Judoka

Sport
- Country: China
- Sport: Judo
- Weight class: –63 kg

Achievements and titles
- Olympic Games: R16 (2008)
- World Champ.: 5th (2001)
- Asian Champ.: (gold) (2006)
Medal record
Women's judo
Representing China
Asian Championships
Bronze medal – third place	2012 Tashkent	–63 kg
Asian Games
Gold medal – first place	2006 Doha	–63 kg
IJF Grand Prix
Gold medal – first place	2010 Abu Dhabi	–63 kg
Bronze medal – third place	2010 Qingdao	–63 kg
World Juniors Championships
Bronze medal – third place	2000 Nabeul	–57 kg

Profile at external databases
- IJF: 2689
- JudoInside.com: 13213
- Updated on 23 February 2022

Xu Yuhua (simplified Chinese: 徐玉华; traditional Chinese: 徐玉華; pinyin: Xú Yùhuá; born March 2, 1983, in Binzhou, Shandong) is a female Chinese judoka who competed at the 2008 Summer Olympics in the Half middleweight (57–63 kg) event. She was eliminated in the first round by a South Korean. She is the older sister of Xu Lili.

== Major performances ==
- 2000 World Junior Championships - 3rd;
- 2001 World Championships - 5th;
- 2001 National Games - 6th;
- 2002/2006 National Champions Tournament - 3rd/2nd;
- 2006 National Championships - 1st;
- 2006 World Cup - 3rd;
- 2008 Paris Super World Cup - 3rd

== See also ==
- China at the 2008 Summer Olympics
- Judo at the 2008 Summer Olympics
