= Janine Nakao =

American judoka (born 1987)

Medal record

Representing United States

Women's judo

Pan American Judo Championships
Silver medal – second place	2010 San Salvador	63 kg

Janine Nakao (born March 14, 1987, in Marina, California) is a judoka from United States.

Her home dojo is Bojuka Ryu Judo Club in Marina. She studied at San Jose University where she was member of SJSU Judo team.

She was a member of Pedro’s Judo Center.

Her biggest international success is winning silver medal at 2010 Pan American Judo Championships. She won the USA Judo National Championships in 2008 and 2009 in -63kg weight category. In 2010 became 3rd. She again won the National Championships in 2011 and 2015 in the -63kg weight division.

== Achievements ==
Year	Tournament	Place	Weight class
2010	Pan American Judo Championships	2nd	Half-Middleweight (- 63 kg)

2009 Rendezvous - Bronze Montreal, Canada

2009 U.S. Open Bronze}

2009 World Team Member - Rotterdam, Netherlands

2010 El Salvador World Cup|Bronze - 63 kg

2010 World Team Member - Tokyo, Japan

2011 Samoa World Cup Bronze - Apia, Samoa

2011 El Salvador World Cup Bronze - San Salvador

2011 World Team Member - Paris, France

2013 Continental Open - Silver Uruguay
