= Marijana Mišković Hasanbegović =

Croatian judoka

Personal information
- Nationality: Croatian
- Born: 8 July 1982 (age 43)
- Occupation: Judoka

Sport
- Country: Croatia
- Sport: Judo
- Weight class: –63 kg

Achievements and titles
- Olympic Games: R16 (2012)
- World Champ.: 7th (2015)
- European Champ.: (bronze) (2009)
Medal record
Women's judo
Representing Croatia
European Championships
Bronze medal – third place	2009 Tbilisi	–63 kg
Bronze medal – third place	2017 Warsaw	Women's team
IJF Grand Slam
Silver medal – second place	2016 Baku	–63 kg
Bronze medal – third place	2009 Paris	–63 kg
Bronze medal – third place	2013 Baku	–63 kg
IJF Grand Prix
Silver medal – second place	2016 Tashkent	–63 kg
Bronze medal – third place	2011 Abu Dhabi	–63 kg
Bronze medal – third place	2013 Rijeka	–63 kg
Mediterranean Games
Gold medal – first place	2013 Mersin	–63 kg

Profile at external databases
- IJF: 2597
- JudoInside.com: 8401
- Updated on 16 November 2022

Marijana Mišković Hasanbegović is a Croatian judoka. At the 2012 Summer Olympics she competed in the Women's 63 kg, but was defeated in the second round.
