= Hilde Drexler =

Austrian judoka (born 1983)

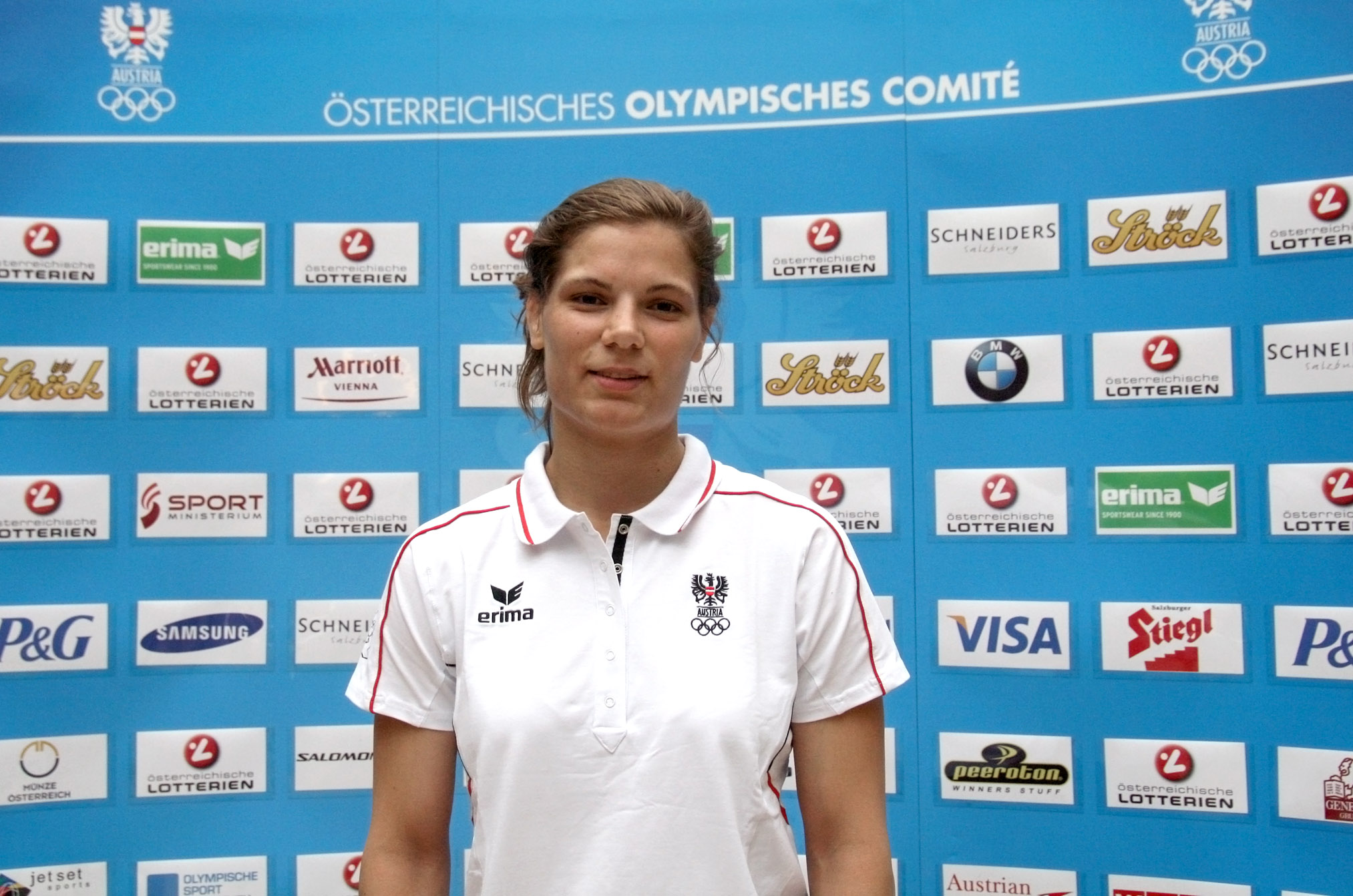
- Hilde Drexler in 2012

Personal information
- Born: 1 December 1983 (age 42)
- Occupation: Judoka

Sport
- Country: Austria
- Sport: Judo
- Weight class: –63 kg
- Rank: 3rd dan black belt
- Club: Vienna Samurai

Achievements and titles
- Olympic Games: R16 (2012)
- World Champ.: 7th (2011)
- European Champ.: (bronze) (2011)
Medal record
Women's judo
Representing Austria
European Championships
Bronze medal – third place	2011 Istanbul	–63 kg
IJF Grand Slam
Bronze medal – third place	2012 Moscow	–63 kg
Bronze medal – third place	2014 Tyumen	–63 kg
IJF Grand Prix
Silver medal – second place	2015 Samsun	–63 kg
Silver medal – second place	2015 Tashkent	–63 kg
Bronze medal – third place	2010 Abu Dhabi	–63 kg
Bronze medal – third place	2013 Tashkent	–63 kg
European Junior Championships
Gold medal – first place	2000 Nicosia	–57 kg
Silver medal – second place	2001 Budapest	–57 kg
Summer Universiade
Bronze medal – third place	2007 Bangkok	–63 kg

Profile at external databases
- IJF: 1781
- JudoInside.com: 8885
- Updated on 17 February 2022

Hilde Drexler (born 1 December 1983 in Vienna) is an Austrian judoka. At the 2012 Summer Olympics she competed in the Women's 63 kg, but was defeated in the second round.

Together with her club Vienna Samurai, she has won the Austrian women's team championships several times and placed in the Golden League twice.
