= Wang Chin-fang =

Taiwanese Olympic judoka (born 1983)

Wang Chin-Fang
Personal information
- Born: 5 July 1983 (age 42)
- Occupation: Judoka
- Height: 1.71 m (5 ft 7 in)

Sport
- Country: Taiwan
- Sport: Judo
- Weight class: ‍–‍63 kg

Achievements and titles
- Olympic Games: 9th (2008)
- World Champ.: 13th (2003)
- Asian Champ.: (silver) (2005, 2010)
Medal record
Women's judo
Representing Chinese Taipei
Asian Games
Silver medal – second place	2010 Guangzhou	‍–‍63 kg
Bronze medal – third place	2002 Busan	‍–‍63 kg
Asian Championships
Silver medal – second place	2005 Tashkent	‍–‍63 kg
Bronze medal – third place	2003 Jeju	‍–‍63 kg
World Juniors Championships
Silver medal – second place	2002 Jeju	‍–‍63 kg
Asian Junior Championships
Gold medal – first place	2001 Ho Chi Minh City	‍–‍63 kg
Silver medal – second place	2000 Hong Kong	‍–‍63 kg
East Asian Games
Bronze medal – third place	2001 Osaka	‍–‍63 kg
Summer Universiade
Gold medal – first place	2007 Bangkok	‍–‍63 kg
Gold medal – first place	2009 Belgrade	‍–‍63 kg

Profile at external databases
- IJF: 2819
- JudoInside.com: 26886
- Updated on 14 February 2022

Wang Chin-Fang (Chinese: 王沁芳; pinyin: Wáng Jīnfāng; born 5 July 1983) is a Taiwanese judoka, who competed for the light middleweight category at the 2008 Summer Olympics in Beijing. She is a two-time defending champion for her category at the 2007 Summer Universiade in Bangkok, Thailand, and at the 2009 Summer Universiade in Belgrade, Serbia. She also won two medals each at the Asian Games and at the Asian Judo Championships.

At the 2008 Summer Olympics, Wang reached the quarterfinal round of the women's 63 kg class, where she was lost to Cuba's Driulis González, who scored a yuko within the closing time of five minutes. Wang qualified for the repechage bout, with a possible chance of capturing an Olympic bronze medal; however, she was narrowly defeated in the second round, with an automatic ippon, scored by Austria's Claudia Heill.
