= Elisabeth Willeboordse =

Dutch judoka (born 1978)

Personal information
- Born: 14 September 1978 (age 47)
- Occupation: Judoka

Sport
- Country: Netherlands
- Sport: Judo
- Weight class: –63 kg

Achievements and titles
- Olympic Games: (bronze) (2008)
- World Champ.: (silver) (2009)
- European Champ.: (gold) (2005, 2010)
Medal record
Women's judo
Representing the Netherlands
Olympic Games
Bronze medal – third place	2008 Beijing	‍–‍63 kg
World Championships
Silver medal – second place	2009 Rotterdam	‍–‍63 kg
Bronze medal – third place	2007 Rio de Janeiro	‍–‍63 kg
European Championships
Gold medal – first place	2005 Rotterdam	‍–‍63 kg
Gold medal – first place	2010 Vienna	‍–‍63 kg
Bronze medal – third place	2006 Tampere	‍–‍63 kg
IJF Grand Slam
Bronze medal – third place	2010 Paris	‍–‍63 kg
Bronze medal – third place	2010 Tokyo	‍–‍63 kg
Bronze medal – third place	2011 Rio de Janeiro	‍–‍63 kg
Bronze medal – third place	2011 Tokyo	‍–‍63 kg
Bronze medal – third place	2012 Paris	‍–‍63 kg
IJF Grand Prix
Gold medal – first place	2010 Rotterdam	‍–‍63 kg
Silver medal – second place	2009 Hamburg	‍–‍63 kg
Silver medal – second place	2010 Tunis	‍–‍63 kg
Silver medal – second place	2011 Amsterdam	‍–‍63 kg
Bronze medal – third place	2011 Düsseldorf	‍–‍63 kg

Profile at external databases
- IJF: 263
- JudoInside.com: 137
- Updated on 30 May 2023

Elisabeth Willeboordse (born 14 September 1978 in Middelburg, Zeeland) is a female judoka from the Netherlands, who won the title in the women's ‍–‍63 kg division at the 2005 European Championships. A year later, when Tampere, Finland hosted the event, she was defeated in the semi-finals by eventual gold medallist Sarah Clark from Great Britain, and had to be satisfied with the bronze medal in her weight division. In 2010, she regained her European title, defeating Edwige Gwend in the final.

At the 2008 Summer Olympics, Willeboordse won a bronze medal, beating Driulis González in her medal match. She also competed at the 2012 Summer Olympics.

Willeboordse has won silver and bronze medals at world championship level. She won silver in 2009, losing to Yoshie Ueno in the final. In 2007, she won a bronze medal.

Awards
Preceded by (Netherlands) Leontien van Moorsel	Rotterdam Sportswoman of the Year; 2005	Succeeded by (Netherlands) Fatima Moreira de Melo
Preceded by (Netherlands) Fatima Moreira de Melo	Rotterdam Sportswoman of the Year; 2007	Succeeded by (Netherlands) Deborah Gravenstijn
