= Yang Junxia =

Chinese judoka (born 1989)

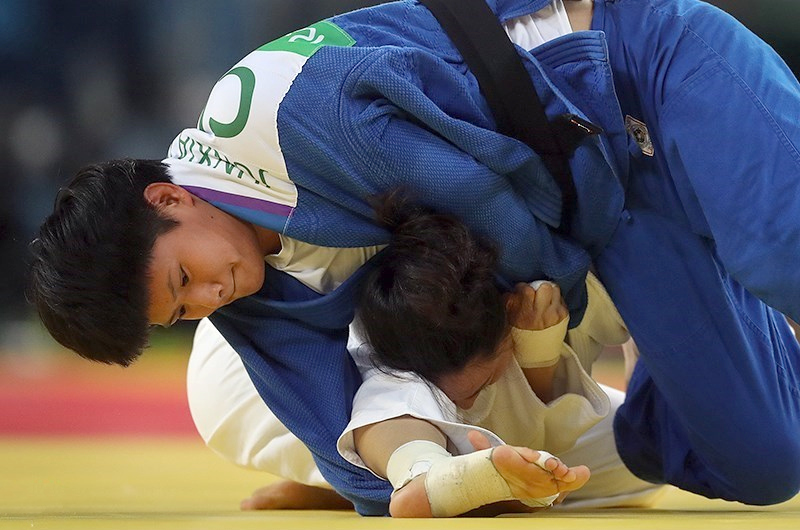
- Yang at the 2016 Olympics

Personal information
- Born: 2 May 1989 (age 37) Binzhou, Shandong, China
- Occupation: Judoka
- Height: 169 cm (5 ft 7 in)

Sport
- Country: China
- Sport: Judo
- Weight class: ‍–‍63 kg
- Club: Shandong Province Team
- Coached by: Cheng Zhishan (national)

Achievements and titles
- Olympic Games: 7th (2016)
- World Champ.: 5th (2017)
- Asian Champ.: (gold) (2019)
Medal record
Women's judo
Representing China
Asian Games
Silver medal – second place	2014 Incheon	‍–‍63 kg
Bronze medal – third place	2014 Incheon	Women's team
Asian Championships
Gold medal – first place	2019 Fujairah	‍–‍63 kg
Bronze medal – third place	2016 Tashkent	‍–‍63 kg
Bronze medal – third place	2021 Bishkek	‍–‍63 kg
World Masters
Bronze medal – third place	2016 Guadalajara	‍–‍63 kg
IJF Grand Slam
Silver medal – second place	2021 Tbilisi	‍–‍63 kg
Bronze medal – third place	2019 Abu Dhabi	‍–‍63 kg
IJF Grand Prix
Gold medal – first place	2014 Ulaanbaatar	‍–‍63 kg
Gold medal – first place	2015 Qingdao	‍–‍63 kg
Gold medal – first place	2018 The Hague	‍–‍63 kg
Bronze medal – third place	2016 Samsun	‍–‍63 kg
Bronze medal – third place	2019 Hohhot	‍–‍63 kg
Bronze medal – third place	2019 Budapest	‍–‍63 kg

Profile at external databases
- IJF: 11713
- JudoInside.com: 55277
- Updated on 20 November 2022

Yang Junxia (born 2 May 1989) is a Chinese judoka who competes in the 63 kg division. She won a silver medal at the 2014 Asian Games and was eliminated in the repechage at the 2016 Olympics. She also competed in the women's 63 kg event at the 2020 Summer Olympics held in Tokyo, Japan.
