= Xu Lili =

Chinese judoka (born 1988)

Personal information
- Born: 16 February 1988 (age 38)
- Occupation: Judoka

Sport
- Country: China
- Sport: Judo
- Weight class: –63 kg

Achievements and titles
- Olympic Games: (silver) (2012)
- World Champ.: 13th (2007)
- Asian Champ.: (gold) (2011, 2013)
Medal record
Women's judo
Representing China
Olympic Games
Silver medal – second place	2012 London	‍–‍63 kg
Asian Championships
Gold medal – first place	2011 Abu Dhabi	‍–‍63 kg
Gold medal – first place	2013 Bangkok	‍–‍63 kg
World Masters
Bronze medal – third place	2012 Almaty	‍–‍63 kg
IJF Grand Slam
Silver medal – second place	2011 Paris	‍–‍63 kg
Bronze medal – third place	2008 Tokyo	‍–‍63 kg
Bronze medal – third place	2011 Moscow	‍–‍63 kg
IJF Grand Prix
Gold medal – first place	2011 Qingdao	‍–‍63 kg
Bronze medal – third place	2011 Amsterdam	‍–‍63 kg

Profile at external databases
- IJF: 2573
- JudoInside.com: 31782
- Updated on 28 May 2023

Xu Lili (Chinese: 徐丽丽; pinyin: Xú Lìlì; born 18 February 1988) is a Chinese judoka from Binzhou, Shandong who made it to the finals in the 2012 Summer Olympics in the category Women's 63 kg, winning a silver medal. She is the younger sister of Xu Yuhua, also a judoka.
