= Johanna Ylinen =

Finnish judoka (born 1984)

Personal information
- Born: 19 July 1984 (age 41) Pori, Satakunta, Finland
- Occupation: Judoka

Sport
- Country: Finland
- Sport: Judo
- Weight class: –63 kg

Achievements and titles
- Olympic Games: R16 (2012)
- World Champ.: 9th (2005)
- European Champ.: 7th (2004, 2012)
Medal record
Women's judo
Representing Finland
IJF Grand Slam
Bronze medal – third place	2010 Moscow	–63 kg
European U23 Championships
Silver medal – second place	2004 Ljubljana	–63 kg
European Junior Championships
Bronze medal – third place	2002 Rotterdam	–63 kg
European Cadet Championships
Gold medal – first place	2000 Oradea	–63 kg

Profile at external databases
- IJF: 458
- JudoInside.com: 12597
- Updated on 28 November 2022

Johanna Ylinen (born 19 July 1984 in Pori) is a Finnish judoka. At the 2008 Summer Olympics, she lost in the first round of the women's 63 kg. At the 2012 Summer Olympics she competed in the Women's 63 kg, but was defeated in the second round.
