= Yoshie Ueno =

Japanese judoka (born 1983)

Personal information
- Born: 1 July 1983 (age 43)
- Occupation: Judoka

Sport
- Country: Japan
- Sport: Judo
- Weight class: ‍–‍63 kg

Achievements and titles
- Olympic Games: (bronze) (2012)
- World Champ.: (gold) (2009, 2010)
- Asian Champ.: (gold) (2003, 2005, 2007, 2010, 2012)
Medal record
Women's judo
Representing Japan
Olympic Games
Bronze medal – third place	2012 London	‍–‍63 kg
World Championships
Gold medal – first place	2009 Rotterdam	‍–‍63 kg
Gold medal – first place	2010 Tokyo	‍–‍63 kg
Silver medal – second place	2011 Paris	‍–‍63 kg
Asian Games
Gold medal – first place	2010 Guangzhou	‍–‍63 kg
Asian Championships
Gold medal – first place	2003 Jeju	‍–‍63 kg
Gold medal – first place	2005 Tashkent	‍–‍63 kg
Gold medal – first place	2007 Kuwait City	‍–‍63 kg
Gold medal – first place	2012 Tashkent	‍–‍63 kg
Bronze medal – third place	2011 Abu Dhabi	‍–‍63 kg
World Masters
Gold medal – first place	2010 Suwon	‍–‍63 kg
Gold medal – first place	2012 Almaty	‍–‍63 kg
Silver medal – second place	2011 Baku	‍–‍63 kg
IJF Grand Slam
Gold medal – first place	2009 Paris	‍–‍63 kg
Gold medal – first place	2009 Tokyo	‍–‍63 kg
Gold medal – first place	2010 Rio de Janeiro	‍–‍63 kg
Silver medal – second place	2008 Tokyo	‍–‍63 kg
Silver medal – second place	2009 Moscow	‍–‍63 kg
Silver medal – second place	2011 Tokyo	‍–‍63 kg
Bronze medal – third place	2010 Paris	‍–‍63 kg
IJF Grand Prix
Gold medal – first place	2009 Hamburg	‍–‍63 kg
Gold medal – first place	2011 Düsseldorf	‍–‍63 kg
World Juniors Championships
Gold medal – first place	2002 Jeju	‍–‍63 kg
Asian Junior Championships
Bronze medal – third place	2000 Hong Kong	‍–‍63 kg

Profile at external databases
- IJF: 78
- JudoInside.com: 14043
- Updated on 28 May 2023

Yoshie Ueno (上野 順恵, Ueno Yoshie; born 1 July 1983, in Asahikawa Hokkaidō) is a Japanese judoka.

Ueno won the gold medal in the Half-middleweight (63 kg) division at the 2009 World Judo Championships and in 2010. In 2011 she lost the final to local hero Gévrise Émane.

Ueno's elder sister is Masae Ueno, who retired in 2009 after winning gold at the 2004 and 2008 Summer Olympics. At the 2012 Summer Olympics Ueno won a bronze medal after losing in the quarter-finals to South Korean eighth seed Joung Da-Woon.
