= Urška Žolnir =

Slovenian judoka (born 1981)

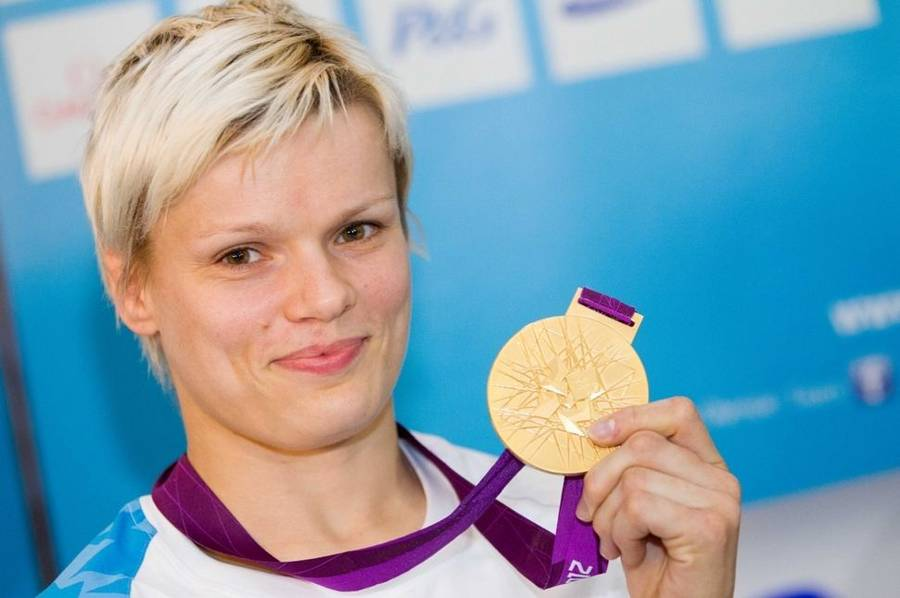

Personal information
- Born: 9 October 1981 (age 44)
- Occupation: Judoka

Sport
- Country: Slovenia
- Sport: Judo
- Weight class: –63 kg

Achievements and titles
- Olympic Games: (gold) (2012)
- World Champ.: (bronze) (2005, 2011)
- European Champ.: (gold) (2009)
Medal record
Women's judo
Representing Slovenia
Olympic Games
Gold medal – first place	2012 London	‍–‍63 kg
Bronze medal – third place	2004 Athens	‍–‍63 kg
World Championships
Bronze medal – third place	2005 Cairo	‍–‍63 kg
Bronze medal – third place	2011 Paris	‍–‍63 kg
European Championships
Gold medal – first place	2009 Tbilisi	‍–‍63 kg
Silver medal – second place	2007 Belgrade	‍–‍63 kg
Bronze medal – third place	2008 Lisbon	‍–‍63 kg
Bronze medal – third place	2011 Istanbul	‍–‍63 kg
IJF Grand Slam
Gold medal – first place	2008 Tokyo	‍–‍63 kg
Gold medal – first place	2011 Moscow	‍–‍63 kg
Gold medal – first place	2011 Tokyo	‍–‍63 kg
Bronze medal – third place	2011 Paris	‍–‍63 kg
IJF Grand Prix
Gold medal – first place	2009 Tunis	‍–‍63 kg
Silver medal – second place	2010 Rotterdam	‍–‍63 kg
Silver medal – second place	2011 Baku	‍–‍63 kg
Bronze medal – third place	2010 Tunis	‍–‍63 kg
European Junior Championships
Gold medal – first place	1997 Ljubljana	‍–‍61 kg
Gold medal – first place	1999 Rome	‍–‍63 kg
Mediterranean Games
Gold medal – first place	2009 Pescara	‍–‍63 kg
Bronze medal – third place	2005 Almeria	‍–‍63 kg
Military World Games
Gold medal – first place	2003 Catania	‍–‍63 kg
Gold medal – first place	2011 Rio de Janeiro	‍–‍63 kg

Profile at external databases
- IJF: 268
- JudoInside.com: 3426
- Updated on 28 May 2023

Urška Žolnir (born 9 October 1981) is a Slovenian politician and a retired judoka. She is a member of Judo Club Sankaku Celje.

She won the bronze medal in the half-middleweight (–63 kg) division at the 2004 Summer Olympics and gold medal at the 2012 Olympics in the same division. That makes her the most successful Slovenian judoka of all time.

She was the Slovenian flagbearer at the 2008 Summer Olympics Parade of Nations.

She is a candidate for the Slovenian National Assembly under the Party Povežimo Slovenijo.

Olympic Games
Preceded by Beno Lapajne	Flagbearer for Slovenia; Beijing 2008	Succeeded by Peter Kauzer
