= Ramila Yusubova =

Azerbaijani judoka

Personal information
- Full name: Ramila Shahvalad qizi Yusubova
- Born: 28 July 1987 (age 38)
- Occupation: Judoka

Sport
- Country: Azerbaijan
- Sport: Judo
- Weight class: ‍–‍63 kg
- Club: Galatasaray Judo

Achievements and titles
- Olympic Games: R16 (2012)
- World Champ.: (bronze) (2010)
- European Champ.: 5th (2012)
Medal record
Women's judo
Representing Azerbaijan
World Championships
Bronze medal – third place	2010 Tokyo	‍–‍63 kg
IJF Grand Prix
Silver medal – second place	2011 Abu Dhabi	‍–‍63 kg
Silver medal – second place	2012 Baku	‍–‍63 kg
European U23 Championships
Bronze medal – third place	2006 Moscow	‍–‍57 kg
Bronze medal – third place	2009 Antalya	‍–‍63 kg
European Cadet Championships
Gold medal – first place	2003 Baku	‍–‍57 kg

Profile at external databases
- IJF: 2227
- JudoInside.com: 30187
- Updated on 25 July 2023

Ramila Shahvalad qizi Yusubova (born 28 July 1989 in Tbilisi) is an Azerbaijani judoka. (Note: "Ramila Yusubova". London 2012. The London Organising Committee of the Olympic Games and Paralympic Games Limited.) At the 2012 Summer Olympics she competed in the Women's 63 kg, but was defeated in the second round.

Yusubova was Cadet European champion in 2003. She won a bronze medal at the 2010 World Championships in the ‍–‍63 kg category.
