= Gülnar Haýytbaýewa =

Turkmenistani judoka

Personal information
- Born: 24 March 1985 (age 39)
- Occupation: Judoka

Sport
- Sport: Judo

Gulnar Hayytbaeva is a Turkmenistani judoka. At the 2012 Summer Olympics she competed in the Women's 63 kg, but was defeated in the first round by Ramila Yusubova.

She graduated from The National Institute of Sports and Tourism of Turkmenistan in 2013. At the 2013 Summer Universiade she won a bronze medal in belt wrestling (freestyle 66 kg).
