= 2014 World Judo Championships – Women's 52 kg =

Judo competition

Judo Women's 52 kg at the 2014 World Judo Championships
- Venue: Traktor Ice Arena
- Location: Chelyabinsk, Russia
- Date: 26 August 2014
- Competitors: 42 from 35 nations
- Total prize money: 14,000$

Medalists
gold medal	Majlinda Kelmendi (2nd title)
silver medal	Andreea Chițu	Romania
bronze medal	Érika Miranda	Brazil
bronze medal	Natalia Kuziutina	Russia

Competition at external databases
- Links: IJF • JudoInside

The women's 52 kg competition of the 2014 World Judo Championships was held on 26 August.

== Medalists ==
Gold	Silver	Bronze
Majlinda Kelmendi (IJF) (Note: Kelmendi did not compete under the Kosovo's flag this year but under the International Judo Federation flag instead.)	Andreea Chițu (ROU)	Érika Miranda (BRA); Natalia Kuziutina (RUS)

== Results ==
=== Finals ===
Semi-finals
Majlinda Kelmendi	001
(Russia) Natalia Kuziutina	000
(Brazil) Érika Miranda	010
(Romania) Andreea Chițu	100

Final
Majlinda Kelmendi	011
(Romania) Andreea Chițu	000

=== Repechage ===
Repechage		Third place
(Cuba) Yanet Bermoy	100
(Japan) Yuki Hashimoto	001	(Cuba) Yanet Bermoy	000
		(Brazil) Érika Miranda	000

Repechage		Third place
(China) Ma Yingnan	100
(Germany) Mareen Kräh	000	(China) Ma Yingnan	000
		(Russia) Natalia Kuziutina	001

=== Pool A ===
First Round
(Israel) Roni Schwartz	110
(Croatia) Andrea Bekic	000
(Cuba) Yanet Bermoy	100
(Burundi) Antoinette Gasongo	000

Quarterfinals
Majlinda Kelmendi	100
(Venezuela) Vanessa Cortesia	000
(Israel) Roni Schwartz	000
(Mongolia) Mönkhbaataryn Bundmaa	001
(Belgium) Ilse Heylen	000
(Cuba) Yanet Bermoy	100
(Belarus) Darya Skrypnik	101
(Romania) Larisa Florian	000

Semifinals
Majlinda Kelmendi	000
(Mongolia) Mönkhbaataryn Bundmaa	000
(Cuba) Yanet Bermoy	001
(Belarus) Darya Skrypnik	000

Final
Majlinda Kelmendi	100
(Cuba) Yanet Bermoy	000

=== Pool B ===
First Round
(Tunisia) Hela Ayari	100
(United States) Angelica Delgado	000
(Dominican Republic) María García	000
(France) Priscilla Gneto	001
(Ukraine) Oleksandra Starkova	100
(Portugal) Joana Ramos	000

Quarterfinals
(Japan) Yuki Hashimoto	101
(Tunisia) Hela Ayari	000
(Argentina) Oritia González	000
(France) Priscilla Gneto	100
(Russia) Natalia Kuziutina	100
(Ukraine) Oleksandra Starkova	000
(Germany) Romy Tarangul	000
(Luxembourg) Marie Muller	000

Semifinals
(Japan) Yuki Hashimoto	100
(France) Priscilla Gneto	000
(Russia) Natalia Kuziutina	000
(Germany) Romy Tarangul	000

Final
(Japan) Yuki Hashimoto	000
(Russia) Natalia Kuziutina	100

=== Pool C ===
First Round
(Turkmenistan) Gulbadam Babamuratova	001
(Tunisia) Nesria Jlassi	000
(Hungary) Barbara Maros	000
(Mongolia) Tsolmon Adiyasambuu	000

Quarterfinals
(Brazil) Érika Miranda	100
(Turkmenistan) Gulbadam Babamuratova	000
(Spain) Laura Gómez	010
(Republic of Ireland) Lisa Kearney	000
(Israel) Gili Cohen	001
(Mongolia) Tsolmon Adiyasambuu	010
(China) Ma Yingnan	000
(Russia) Yulia Kazarina	000

Semifinals
(Brazil) Érika Miranda	001
(Spain) Laura Gómez	000
(Mongolia) Tsolmon Adiyasambuu	000
(China) Ma Yingnan	000

Final
(Brazil) Érika Miranda	100
(China) Ma Yingnan	000

=== Pool D ===
First Round
(North Korea) Rim Song-sim	002
(Mexico) Luz Olvera	000
(Australia) Hannah Trotter	000
(Ukraine) Tetiana Levytska	110
(South Korea) Ha Ju-hee	000
(Mauritius) Christianne Legentil	100

Quarterfinals
(Germany) Mareen Kräh	000
(North Korea) Rim Song-sim	000
(Armenia) Zhanna Stankevich	010
(Ukraine) Tetiana Levytska	011
(Romania) Andreea Chițu	110
(Mauritius) Christianne Legentil	011
(Italy) Odette Giuffrida	001
(Slovenia) Petra Nareks	000

Semifinals
(Germany) Mareen Kräh	100
(Ukraine) Tetiana Levytska	001
(Romania) Andreea Chițu	110
(Italy) Odette Giuffrida	000

Final
(Germany) Mareen Kräh	000
(Romania) Andreea Chițu	101

== Prize money ==
The sums listed bring the total prizes awarded to $14,000 for the individual event.

Medal	Total	Judoka	Coach
Gold	$6,000	$4,800	$1,200
Silver	$4,000	$3,200	$800
Bronze	$2,000	$1,600	$400
