= Judo at the 2018 Asian Games =

Judo competition

- Venue: Jakarta Convention Center
- Dates: 29 August – 1 September
- Competitors: 252 from 35 nations

Judo at the 2018 Asian Games was held at the Jakarta Convention Center Plenary Hall, Jakarta, Indonesia, from 29 August to 1 September 2018.

== Schedule ==
P	Preliminary rounds & Repechage	F	Finals

Event↓/Date →	29th Wed		30th Thu		31st Fri		1st Sat	
Men's 60 kg	P	F						
Men's 66 kg	P	F						
Men's 73 kg			P	F				
Men's 81 kg			P	F				
Men's 90 kg					P	F		
Men's 100 kg					P	F		
Men's +100 kg					P	F		
Women's 48 kg	P	F						
Women's 52 kg	P	F						
Women's 57 kg			P	F				
Women's 63 kg			P	F				
Women's 70 kg			P	F				
Women's 78 kg					P	F		
Women's +78 kg					P	F		
Mixed team							P	F

== Medalists ==
=== Men ===
Event	Gold	Silver	Bronze
Extra lightweight (−60 kg)	Diyorbek Urozboev; Uzbekistan	Toru Shishime; Japan	Yang Yung-wei; Chinese Taipei
Extra lightweight (−60 kg)	Diyorbek Urozboev; Uzbekistan	Toru Shishime; Japan	Lee Ha-rim; South Korea
Half lightweight (−66 kg)	An Ba-ul; South Korea	Joshiro Maruyama; Japan	Yeldos Zhumakanov; Kazakhstan
Half lightweight (−66 kg)	An Ba-ul; South Korea	Joshiro Maruyama; Japan	Artur Te; Kyrgyzstan
Lightweight (−73 kg)	Shohei Ono; Japan	An Chang-rim; South Korea	Victor Scvortov; United Arab Emirates
Lightweight (−73 kg)	Shohei Ono; Japan	An Chang-rim; South Korea	Mohammad Mohammadi; Iran
Half middleweight (−81 kg)	Didar Khamza; Kazakhstan	Saeid Mollaei; Iran	Vladimir Zoloev; Kyrgyzstan
Half middleweight (−81 kg)	Didar Khamza; Kazakhstan	Saeid Mollaei; Iran	Otgonbaataryn Uuganbaatar; Mongolia
Middleweight (−90 kg)	Gwak Dong-han; South Korea	Gantulgyn Altanbagana; Mongolia	Komronshokh Ustopiriyon; Tajikistan
Middleweight (−90 kg)	Gwak Dong-han; South Korea	Gantulgyn Altanbagana; Mongolia	Mashu Baker; Japan
Half heavyweight (−100 kg)	Kentaro Iida; Japan	Cho Gu-ham; South Korea	Lkhagvasürengiin Otgonbaatar; Mongolia
Half heavyweight (−100 kg)	Kentaro Iida; Japan	Cho Gu-ham; South Korea	Sherali Juraev; Uzbekistan
Heavyweight (+100 kg)	Kim Sung-min; South Korea	Ölziibayaryn Düürenbayar; Mongolia	Bekmurod Oltiboev; Uzbekistan
Heavyweight (+100 kg)	Kim Sung-min; South Korea	Ölziibayaryn Düürenbayar; Mongolia	Shakarmamad Mirmamadov; Tajikistan

=== Women ===
Event	Gold	Silver	Bronze
Extra lightweight (−48 kg)	Jeong Bo-kyeong; South Korea	Ami Kondo; Japan	Galbadrakhyn Otgontsetseg; Kazakhstan
Extra lightweight (−48 kg)	Jeong Bo-kyeong; South Korea	Ami Kondo; Japan	Mönkhbatyn Urantsetseg; Mongolia
Half lightweight (−52 kg)	Natsumi Tsunoda; Japan	Park Da-sol; South Korea	Kachakorn Warasiha; Thailand
Half lightweight (−52 kg)	Natsumi Tsunoda; Japan	Park Da-sol; South Korea	Rim Song-sim; North Korea
Lightweight (−57 kg)	Momo Tamaoki; Japan	Kim Jin-a; North Korea	Dorjsürengiin Sumiyaa; Mongolia
Lightweight (−57 kg)	Momo Tamaoki; Japan	Kim Jin-a; North Korea	Lien Chen-ling; Chinese Taipei
Half middleweight (−63 kg)	Nami Nabekura; Japan	Kiyomi Watanabe; Philippines	Han Hee-ju; South Korea
Half middleweight (−63 kg)	Nami Nabekura; Japan	Kiyomi Watanabe; Philippines	Tang Jing; China
Middleweight (−70 kg)	Saki Niizoe; Japan	Kim Seong-yeon; South Korea	Gulnoza Matniyazova; Uzbekistan
Middleweight (−70 kg)	Saki Niizoe; Japan	Kim Seong-yeon; South Korea	Tsend-Ayuushiin Naranjargal; Mongolia
Half heavyweight (−78 kg)	Ruika Sato; Japan	Park Yu-jin; South Korea	Ikumi Oeda; Thailand
Half heavyweight (−78 kg)	Ruika Sato; Japan	Park Yu-jin; South Korea	Ma Zhenzhao; China
Heavyweight (+78 kg)	Akira Sone; Japan	Kim Min-jeong; South Korea	Gulzhan Issanova; Kazakhstan
Heavyweight (+78 kg)	Akira Sone; Japan	Kim Min-jeong; South Korea	Wang Yan; China

=== Mixed ===
Event	Gold	Silver	Bronze
Team	Japan; Masashi Ebinuma; Shohei Ono; Mashu Baker; Yusuke Kobayashi; Kokoro Kageura; Takeshi Ojitani; Haruka Funakubo; Momo Tamaoki; Saki Niizoe; Shiho Tanaka; Akira Sone; Sara Yamamoto	Kazakhstan; Zhansay Smagulov; Yeldos Zhumakanov; Islam Bozbayev; Didar Khamza; Yerassyl Kazhybayev; Sanzhar Zhabborov; Kamshat Karassaikyzy; Sevara Nishanbayeva; Zere Bektaskyzy; Iolanta Berdybekova; Gulzhan Issanova; Zarina Raifova	South Korea; Ahn Joon-sung; An Chang-rim; Gwak Dong-han; Lee Jae-yong; Cho Gu-ham; Kim Sung-min; Kim Jan-di; Kwon You-jeong; Jeong Hye-jin; Kim Seong-yeon; Han Mi-jin; Kim Min-jeong
Team	Japan; Masashi Ebinuma; Shohei Ono; Mashu Baker; Yusuke Kobayashi; Kokoro Kageura; Takeshi Ojitani; Haruka Funakubo; Momo Tamaoki; Saki Niizoe; Shiho Tanaka; Akira Sone; Sara Yamamoto	Kazakhstan; Zhansay Smagulov; Yeldos Zhumakanov; Islam Bozbayev; Didar Khamza; Yerassyl Kazhybayev; Sanzhar Zhabborov; Kamshat Karassaikyzy; Sevara Nishanbayeva; Zere Bektaskyzy; Iolanta Berdybekova; Gulzhan Issanova; Zarina Raifova	China; Bayan Delihei; Qing Daga; Bu Hebilige; Xie Yadong; Qiu Shangao; Shen Zhuhong; Feng Xuemei; Zhang Wen; Liu Hongyan; Zhu Ya; Jiang Yanan; Wang Yan

== Medal table ==
Rank	Nation	Gold	Silver	Bronze	Total
1	Japan (JPN)	9	3	1	13
2	South Korea (KOR)	4	6	3	13
3	Kazakhstan (KAZ)	1	1	3	5
4	Uzbekistan (UZB)	1	0	3	4
5	Mongolia (MGL)	0	2	5	7
6	Iran (IRI)	0	1	1	2
6	North Korea (PRK)	0	1	1	2
8	Philippines (PHI)	0	1	0	1
9	China (CHN)	0	0	4	4
10	Chinese Taipei (TPE)	0	0	2	2
10	Kyrgyzstan (KGZ)	0	0	2	2
10	Tajikistan (TJK)	0	0	2	2
10	Thailand (THA)	0	0	2	2
14	United Arab Emirates (UAE)	0	0	1	1
Totals (14 entries)		15	15	30	60

== Participating nations ==
A total of 252 athletes from 35 nations competed in judo at the 2018 Asian Games:

- Afghanistan (4)
- Cambodia (2)
- China (22)
- Chinese Taipei (12)
- Hong Kong (5)
- Indonesia (16)
- India (6)
- Iran (6)
- Iraq (3)
- Japan (20)
- Jordan (1)
- Kazakhstan (15)
- Kyrgyzstan (8)
- Laos (6)
- Lebanon (4)
- Macau (4)
- Malaysia (1)
- Mongolia (19)
- Nepal (8)
- North Korea (8)
- Pakistan (2)
- Palestine (1)
- Philippines (5)
- Qatar (2)
- Saudi Arabia (1)
- South Korea (19)
- Sri Lanka (2)
- Syria (1)
- Tajikistan (8)
- Thailand (10)
- Turkmenistan (4)
- United Arab Emirates (3)
- Uzbekistan (13)
- Vietnam (7)
- Yemen (4)
