= 2015 World Judo Championships – Women's 52 kg =

Judo competition

Judo Women's 52 kg at the 2015 World Judo Championships
- Venue: Alau Ice Palace
- Location: Astana, Kazakhstan
- Date: 25 August
- Competitors: 43 from 38 nations
- Total prize money: 14,000$

Medalists
gold medal	Misato Nakamura (3rd title)	Japan
silver medal	Andreea Chițu	Romania
bronze medal	Érika Miranda	Brazil
bronze medal	Darya Skrypnik	Belarus

Competition at external databases
- Links: IJF • JudoInside

The women's 52 kg competition of the 2015 World Judo Championships was held on 25 August 2015.

== Results ==
=== Finals ===
Semi-finals
(Romania) Andreea Chițu	010
(Turkmenistan) Gulbadam Babamuratova	000
(Japan) Misato Nakamura	010
(Brazil) Érika Miranda	000

Final
(Romania) Andreea Chițu	000
(Japan) Misato Nakamura	000

=== Repechage ===
Repechage		Third place
(Italy) Odette Giuffrida	001
(Mongolia) Adiyasambuu Tsolmon	000	(Italy) Odette Giuffrida	000
		(Brazil) Érika Miranda	000

Repechage		Third place
(Russia) Natalia Kuziutina	000
(Belarus) Darya Skrypnik	000	(Belarus) Darya Skrypnik	100
		(Turkmenistan) Gulbadam Babamuratova	000

=== Pool A ===
First Round
(Kazakhstan) Olessya Kutsenko	000
(Tunisia) Hela Ayari	001
(Algeria) Djazia Haddad	000
(Poland) Karolina Pieńkowska	001
(Italy) Odette Giuffrida	000
(United Kingdom) Kelly Edwards	000

Second Round
(Romania) Andreea Chițu	100
(Tunisia) Hela Ayari	000
(Kosovo) Distria Krasniqi	010
(Finland) Katri Kakko	000
(Israel) Gili Cohen	001
(Poland) Karolina Pieńkowska	000
(Italy) Odette Giuffrida	100
(Netherlands) Birgit Ente	000

Third Round
(Romania) Andreea Chițu	000
(Kosovo) Distria Krasniqi	000
(Israel) Gili Cohen	000
(Italy) Odette Giuffrida	000

Quarterfinals
(Romania) Andreea Chițu	100
(Italy) Odette Giuffrida	000

=== Pool B ===
First Round
(Australia) Hannah Trotter	000
(Turkmenistan) Gulbadam Babamuratova	100
(Spain) Laura Gómez	000
(Russia) Yulia Kazarina	110

Second Round
(Germany) Mareen Kräh	000
(Turkmenistan) Gulbadam Babamuratova	100
(New Zealand) Justine Bishop	000
(Belgium) Ilse Heylen	010
(China) Ma Yingnan	000
(Russia) Yulia Kazarina	101
(Canada) Ecaterina Guica	000
(Mongolia) Adiyasambuu Tsolmon	003

Third Round
(Turkmenistan) Gulbadam Babamuratova	010
(Belgium) Ilse Heylen	001
(Russia) Yulia Kazarina	000
(Mongolia) Adiyasambuu Tsolmon	000

Quarterfinals
(Turkmenistan) Gulbadam Babamuratova	100
(Mongolia) Adiyasambuu Tsolmon	000

=== Pool C ===
First Round
(North Korea) Rim Song-sim	000
(Cuba) Yanet Bermoy	000
(Mongolia) Mönkhbaataryn Bundmaa	100
(United States) Angelica Delgado	000
(Finland) Jaana Sundberg	000
(Japan) Misato Nakamura	100

Second Round
(Russia) Natalia Kuziutina	001
(North Korea) Rim Song-sim	000
(Mongolia) Mönkhbaataryn Bundmaa	100
(South Korea) Kim Mi-ri	000
(Portugal) Joana Ramos	000
(Japan) Misato Nakamura	100
(Panama) Kristine Jiménez	000
(Ukraine) Tetiana Levytska	100

Third Round
(Russia) Natalia Kuziutina	000
(Mongolia) Mönkhbaataryn Bundmaa	000
(Japan) Misato Nakamura	100
(Ukraine) Tetiana Levytska	000

Quarterfinals
(Russia) Natalia Kuziutina	000
(Japan) Misato Nakamura	001

=== Pool D ===
First Round
(Armenia) Zhanna Stankevich	101
(Israel) Roni Schwartz	000
(Romania) Larisa Florian	100
(Vietnam) Nguyễn Thị Quỳnh	000
(Switzerland) Evelyne Tschopp	110
(Kyrgyzstan) Kseniia Beldiagina	001

Second Round
(Brazil) Érika Miranda	100
(Armenia) Zhanna Stankevich	000
(Romania) Larisa Florian	000
(Kazakhstan) Lenariya Mingazova	111
(France) Annabelle Euranie	010
(Switzerland) Evelyne Tschopp	001
(Belarus) Darya Skrypnik	101
(Mexico) Jennifer Cruz	000

Third Round
(Brazil) Érika Miranda	100
(Kazakhstan) Lenariya Mingazova	000
(France) Annabelle Euranie	000
(Belarus) Darya Skrypnik	000

Quarterfinals
(Brazil) Érika Miranda	100
(Belarus) Darya Skrypnik	000

== Prize money ==
The sums listed bring the total prizes awarded to 14,000$ for the individual event.

Medal	Total	Judoka	Coach
Gold	6,000$	4,800$	1,200$
Silver	4,000$	3,200$	800$
Bronze	2,000$	1,600$	400$
