= 2013 World Judo Championships – Women's 52 kg =

Judo competition

Judo Women's 52 kg at the 2013 World Judo Championships
- Venue: Ginásio do Maracanãzinho
- Location: Rio de Janeiro, Brazil
- Date: 27 August 2013
- Competitors: 41 from 33 nations

Medalists
gold medal	Majlinda Kelmendi (1st title)	Kosovo
silver medal	Érika Miranda	Brazil
bronze medal	Mareen Kräh	Germany
bronze medal	Yuki Hashimoto	Japan

Competition at external databases
- Links: IJF • JudoInside

The women's 52 kg competition of the 2013 World Judo Championships was held on August 27.

== Medalists ==
Gold	Silver	Bronze
Majlinda Kelmendi (KOS)	Érika Miranda (BRA)	Mareen Kräh (GER); Yuki Hashimoto (JPN)

== Results ==
=== Pool A ===
First Round
(France) Priscilla Gneto	000
(Netherlands) Miranda Wolfslag	000
(Dominican Republic) María García	000
(Romania) Andreea Catuna Ionas	101

Quarterfinals
(Kosovo) Majlinda Kelmendi	100
(Portugal) Joana Ramos	000
(France) Priscilla Gneto	100
(Belarus) Darya Skrypnik	000
(Germany) Mareen Kräh	100
(Romania) Andreea Catuna Ionas	000
(Mongolia) Mönkhbaataryn Bundmaa	010
(Israel) Roni Schwartz	001

Semifinals
(Kosovo) Majlinda Kelmendi	000
(France) Priscilla Gneto	000
(Germany) Mareen Kräh	110
(Mongolia) Mönkhbaataryn Bundmaa	011

Final
(Kosovo) Majlinda Kelmendi	100
(Germany) Mareen Kräh	000

=== Pool B ===
First Round
(Argentina) Abi Cardozo	000
(Brazil) Eleudis Valentim	001
(Ukraine) Mariia Buiok	000
(Russia) Yulia Kazarina	100
(Belgium) Ilse Heylen	100
(Haiti) Linouse Desravine	000

Quarterfinals
(Japan) Yuki Hashimoto	100
(Brazil) Eleudis Valentim	000
(Algeria) Djazia Haddad	000
(Russia) Yulia Kazarina	101
(Cuba) Yanet Bermoy	010
(Belgium) Ilse Heylen	000
(Ecuador) Yolanda Arcos	000
(United States) Angelica Delgado	002

Semifinals
(Japan) Yuki Hashimoto	101
(Russia) Yulia Kazarina	000
(Cuba) Yanet Bermoy	010
(United States) Angelica Delgado	000

Final
(Japan) Yuki Hashimoto	100
(Cuba) Yanet Bermoy	001

=== Pool C ===
First Round
(South Korea) Park Da-Sol	000
(Ukraine) Inna Cherniak	100
(Poland) Zuzanna Pawlikowska	000
(Luxembourg) Marie Muller	100

Quarterfinals
(Romania) Andreea Chițu	100
(Ukraine) Inna Cherniak	000
(China) Qi Juan	000
(Italy) Odette Giuffrida	000
(Mongolia) Adiyasambuu Tsolmon	010
(Israel) Gili Cohen	013
(Luxembourg) Marie Muller	100
(Spain) Laura Gómez	010

Semifinals
(Romania) Andreea Chițu	101
(Italy) Odette Giuffrida	000
(Israel) Gili Cohen	010
(Luxembourg) Marie Muller	100

Final
(Romania) Andreea Chițu	012
(Luxembourg) Marie Muller	000

=== Pool D ===
First Round
(Argentina) Jesica Rao	000
(Kazakhstan) Lenariya Mingazova	100
(Zambia) Esther Sando	000
(Netherlands) Birgit Ente	100

Quarterfinals
(Finland) Jaana Sundberg	101
(Turkey) Ayse Arca	000
(Kazakhstan) Lenariya Mingazova	100
(Australia) Hannah Trotter	000
(Brazil) Érika Miranda	100
(Netherlands) Birgit Ente	000
(Mauritius) Christianne Legentil	000
(Russia) Natalia Kuziutina	100

Semifinals
(Finland) Jaana Sundberg	100
(Kazakhstan) Lenariya Mingazova	000
(Brazil) Érika Miranda	000
(Russia) Natalia Kuziutina	000

Final
(Finland) Jaana Sundberg	000
(Brazil) Érika Miranda	101

=== Finals ===
Semi-finals
(Kosovo) Majlinda Kelmendi	000
(Japan) Yuki Hashimoto	000
(Romania) Andreea Chițu	000
(Brazil) Érika Miranda	010

Final
(Kosovo) Majlinda Kelmendi	100
(Brazil) Érika Miranda	000

=== Repechage ===
Repechage		Third place
(Germany) Mareen Kräh	100
(Cuba) Yanet Bermoy	000	(Germany) Mareen Kräh	100
		(Romania) Andreea Chițu	000

Repechage		Third place
(Luxembourg) Marie Muller	000
(Finland) Jaana Sundberg	100	(Finland) Jaana Sundberg	000
		(Japan) Yuki Hashimoto	000
