= Judo at the 2015 European Games – Women's 52 kg =

Judo competition

Judo Women's 52 kg at the 2015 European Games
- Venue: Heydar Aliyev Arena
- Location: Baku, Azerbaijan
- Date: 25 June
- Competitors: 27 from 24 nations

Medalists
| gold medal | Andreea Chițu (2nd title) | Romania |
| silver medal | Annabelle Euranie | France |
| bronze medal | Mareen Kräh | Germany |
| bronze medal | Natalia Kuziutina | Russia |

Competition at external databases
- Links: IJF • JudoInside

The women's 52 kg judo event at the 2015 European Games in Baku was held on 25 June at the Heydar Aliyev Arena.

== Results ==
=== Final ===
| Final |
| Annabelle Euranie (FRA) | 000 |
| Andreea Chițu (ROU) | 001 |

=== Repechage ===
Repechage
Larisa Florian (ROU) | 100
Birgit Ente (NED) | 000

Third place
Larisa Florian (ROU) | 000
Mareen Kräh (GER) | 100

Repechage
Odette Giuffrida (ITA) | 000
Tetiana Levytska (UKR) | 000

Third place
Odette Giuffrida (ITA) | 000
Natalia Kuziutina (RUS) | 000

=== Top half ===
Round of 32
Agata Perenc (POL) | 101
Darya Skrypnik (BLR) | 000
Jaana Sundberg (FIN) | 000
Larisa Florian (ROU) | 000
Kelly Edwards (GBR) | 001
Zhanna Stankevich (ARM) | 000
Evelyne Tschopp (SUI) | 010
Ayşe Arca (TUR) | 000
Birgit Ente (NED) | 011
Barbara Maros (HUN) | 000

Round of 16
Natalia Kuziutina (RUS) | 000
Agata Perenc (POL) | 000
Larisa Florian (ROU) | 100
Laia Talarn (ESP) | 010
Annabelle Euranie (FRA) | 100
Evelyne Tschopp (SUI) | 000
Gili Cohen (ISR) | 000
Birgit Ente (NED) | 100

Quarterfinals
Natalia Kuziutina (RUS) | 001
Larisa Florian (ROU) | 000
Annabelle Euranie (FRA) | 100
Birgit Ente (NED) | 000

Semifinals
Natalia Kuziutina (RUS) | 000
Annabelle Euranie (FRA) | 000

=== Bottom half ===
Round of 32
Roni Schwartz (ISR) | 100
Sakina Zayirova (AZE) | 000
Odette Giuffrida (ITA) | 000
Ilse Heylen (BEL) | 000
Joana Ramos (POR) | 000
Distria Krasniqi (KOS) | 000
Judith Biedermann (LIE) | 000
Laura Gómez (ESP) | 100
Yulia Kazarina (RUS) | 011
Marie Muller (LUX) | 000
Tetiana Levytska (UKR) | 111
Petra Nareks (SLO) | 000

Round of 16
Andreea Chițu (ROU) | 101
Roni Schwartz (ISR) | 001
Odette Giuffrida (ITA) | 000
Distria Krasniqi (KOS) | 000
Mareen Kräh (GER) | 000
Laura Gómez (ESP) | 000
Yulia Kazarina (RUS) | 000
Tetiana Levytska (UKR) | 002

Quarterfinals
Andreea Chițu (ROU) | 001
Odette Giuffrida (ITA) | 000
Mareen Kräh (GER) | 001
Tetiana Levytska (UKR) | 000

Semifinals
Andreea Chițu (ROU) | 100
Mareen Kräh (GER) | 000
