= Judo at the 2014 Asian Games – Women's 52 kg =

Judo competition

Women's 52 kg at the 2014 Asian Games
- Venue: Dowon Gymnasium
- Date: 20 September 2014
- Competitors: 14 from 14 nations

Medalists
gold medal	Misato Nakamura	Japan
silver medal	Gülbadam Babamuratowa	Turkmenistan
bronze medal	Jung Eun-jung	South Korea
bronze medal	Lenariya Mingazova	Kazakhstan

The women's 52 kilograms (half lightweight) competition at the 2014 Asian Games in Incheon was held on 20 September at the Dowon Gymnasium.

== Schedule ==
All times are Korea Standard Time (UTC+09:00)

Date	Time	Event
Saturday, 20 September 2014	14:00	Elimination round of 16
Saturday, 20 September 2014	14:00	Quarterfinals
Saturday, 20 September 2014	14:00	Semifinals
Saturday, 20 September 2014	14:00	Final of repechage
Saturday, 20 September 2014	19:00	Finals

== Results ==
Legend

- WO — Won by walkover

=== Main bracket ===
Elimination round of 16
Lenariya Mingazova (KAZ)	110
Vong Chi Ieng (MAC)	000
Jung Eun-jung (KOR)	100
Nguyễn Thị Thanh Thúy (VIE)	000
Gülbadam Babamuratowa (TKM)	100
Kseniia Beldiagina (KGZ)	000
Kalpana Devi Thoudam (IND)	100
Devika Khadka (NEP)	000
Misato Nakamura (JPN)	WO
Ri Chang-ok (PRK)
Lien Pei-ju (TPE)	100
Saliha Masoud (QAT)	000

Quarterfinals
Adiyaasambuugiin Tsolmon (MGL)	000
Lenariya Mingazova (KAZ)	000
Jung Eun-jung (KOR)	000
Gülbadam Babamuratowa (TKM)	001
Ma Yingnan (CHN)	010
Kalpana Devi Thoudam (IND)	000
Misato Nakamura (JPN)	100
Lien Pei-ju (TPE)	000

Semifinals
Lenariya Mingazova (KAZ)	000
Gülbadam Babamuratowa (TKM)	001
Ma Yingnan (CHN)	000
Misato Nakamura (JPN)	100

Gold medal contest
Gülbadam Babamuratowa (TKM)	000
Misato Nakamura (JPN)	100

=== Repechage ===
Final of repechage
Adiyaasambuugiin Tsolmon (MGL)	000
Jung Eun-jung (KOR)	001
Kalpana Devi Thoudam (IND)	100
Lien Pei-ju (TPE)	000

Bronze medal contests
Jung Eun-jung (KOR)	000
Ma Yingnan (CHN)	000
Kalpana Devi Thoudam (IND)	000
Lenariya Mingazova (KAZ)	101
