= 2014 World Judo Championships – Women's 78 kg =

Judo competition

Judo Women's 78 kg at the 2014 World Judo Championships
- Venue: Traktor Ice Arena
- Location: Chelyabinsk, Russia
- Date: 29 August 2014
- Competitors: 36 from 29 nations
- Total prize money: 14,000$

Medalists
gold medal	Mayra Aguiar (1st title)	Brazil
silver medal	Audrey Tcheuméo	France
bronze medal	Kayla Harrison	United States
bronze medal	Anamari Velenšek	Slovenia

Competition at external databases
- Links: IJF • JudoInside

The women's 78 kg competition of the 2014 World Judo Championships was held on 29 August.

== Medalists ==
Gold	Silver	Bronze
Mayra Aguiar (BRA)	Audrey Tcheuméo (FRA)	Kayla Harrison (USA); Anamari Velenšek (SLO)

== Results ==
=== Finals ===
Semi-finals
(France) Audrey Tcheuméo	100
(North Korea) Sol Kyong	000
(United States) Kayla Harrison	000
(Brazil) Mayra Aguiar	011

Final
(France) Audrey Tcheuméo	000
(Brazil) Mayra Aguiar	010

=== Repechage ===
Repechage		Third place
(Cuba) Yalennis Castillo	000
(Portugal) Yahima Ramirez	001	(Portugal) Yahima Ramirez	000
		(United States) Kayla Harrison	000

Repechage		Third place
(Slovenia) Anamari Velenšek	100
(Russia) Alena Kachorovskaya	000	(Slovenia) Anamari Velenšek	001
		(North Korea) Sol Kyong	000

=== Pool A ===
First Round
(Japan) Ruika Sato	001
(China) Zhang Zhehui	000

Quarterfinals
(France) Audrey Tcheuméo	101
(United States) Samantha Bleier	000
(Poland) Katarzyna Furmanek	000
(Spain) Marta Tort	000
(United Kingdom) Natalie Powell	000
(Cuba) Yalennis Castillo	000
(Algeria) Kaouthar Ouallal	000
(Japan) Ruika Sato	100

Semifinals
(France) Audrey Tcheuméo	101
(Spain) Marta Tort	000
(Cuba) Yalennis Castillo	000
(Japan) Ruika Sato	000

Final
(France) Audrey Tcheuméo	100
(Cuba) Yalennis Castillo	000

=== Pool B ===
First Round
(Kazakhstan) Albina Amangeldiyeva	100
(Gabon) Sarah Mazouz	001

Quarterfinals
(Germany) Luise Malzahn	000
(South Korea) Yoon Hyun-ji	101
(Kazakhstan) Albina Amangeldiyeva	000
(Portugal) Yahima Ramirez	100
(North Korea) Sol Kyong	001
(Ukraine) Victoriia Turks	000
(Cameroon) Hortence Mballa	000
(Netherlands) Guusje Steenhuis	100

Semifinals
(South Korea) Yoon Hyun-ji	000
(Portugal) Yahima Ramirez	100
(North Korea) Sol Kyong	001
(Netherlands) Guusje Steenhuis	000

Final
(Portugal) Yahima Ramirez	000
(North Korea) Sol Kyong	110

=== Pool C ===
First Round
(France) Lucie Louette	010
(Poland) Daria Pogorzelec	000

Quarterfinals
(Slovenia) Anamari Velenšek	000
(France) Lucie Louette	000
(South Korea) Choi Mi-young	000
(Croatia) Ivana Maranić	000
(Canada) Catherine Roberge	000
(United States) Kayla Harrison	000
(Bolivia) Kayna Patiño	000
(Chinese Taipei) Wang Szu-chu	100

Semifinals
(Slovenia) Anamari Velenšek	100
(South Korea) Choi Mi-young	000
(United States) Kayla Harrison	101
(Chinese Taipei) Wang Szu-chu	000

Final
(Slovenia) Anamari Velenšek	000
(United States) Kayla Harrison	100

=== Pool D ===
First Round
(Russia) Alena Kachorovskaya	100
(Ecuador) Diana Chalá	000

Quarterfinals
(Brazil) Mayra Aguiar	100
(Italy) Assunta Galeone	000
(Spain) Laia Talarn	000
(Ukraine) Anastasiya Turchyn	000
(Hungary) Abigél Joó	000
(Mongolia) Munkhtuya Battulga	010
(Russia) Alena Kachorovskaya	100
(Kazakhstan) Zarina Raifova	000

Semifinals
(Brazil) Mayra Aguiar	011
(Spain) Laia Talarn	000
(Mongolia) Munkhtuya Battulga	000
(Russia) Alena Kachorovskaya	000

Final
(Brazil) Mayra Aguiar	100
(Russia) Alena Kachorovskaya	000

== Prize money ==
The sums listed bring the total prizes awarded to 14,000$ for the individual event.

Medal	Total	Judoka	Coach
Gold	6,000$	4,800$	1,200$
Silver	4,000$	3,200$	800$
Bronze	2,000$	1,600$	400$
