= 2015 World Judo Championships – Women's 78 kg =

Judo competition

Judo Women's 78 kg at the 2015 World Judo Championships
- Venue: Alau Ice Palace
- Location: Astana, Kazakhstan
- Date: 28 August
- Competitors: 33 from 27 nations
- Total prize money: 14,000$

Medalists
gold medal	Mami Umeki (1st title)	Japan
silver medal	Anamari Velenšek	Slovenia
bronze medal	Luise Malzahn	Germany
bronze medal	Marhinde Verkerk	Netherlands

Competition at external databases
- Links: IJF • JudoInside

The women's 78 kg competition of the 2015 World Judo Championships was held on 28 August 2015.

== Results ==
=== Finals ===
Semi-finals
(Poland) Daria Pogorzelec	000
(Japan) Mami Umeki	100
(France) Audrey Tcheuméo	000
(Slovenia) Anamari Velenšek	000

Final
(Japan) Mami Umeki	100
(Slovenia) Anamari Velenšek	000

=== Repechage ===
Repechage		Third place
(South Korea) Yoon Hyun-ji	000
(Germany) Luise Malzahn	100	(Germany) Luise Malzahn	100
		(France) Audrey Tcheuméo	000

Repechage		Third place
(Netherlands) Marhinde Verkerk	100
(United Kingdom) Gemma Gibbons	000	(Netherlands) Marhinde Verkerk	000
		(Poland) Daria Pogorzelec	000

=== Pool A ===
First Round
(Poland) Daria Pogorzelec	010
(Mongolia) Pürevjargalyn Lkhamdegd	000

Second Round
(United States) Kayla Harrison	100
(Guatemala) Mirla Nolberto	000
(South Korea) Yoon Hyun-ji	101
(Hungary) Evelin Salánki	000
(Brazil) Mayra Aguiar	100
(Chile) Jacqueline Usnayo	000
(Ukraine) Victoriia Turks	000
(Poland) Daria Pogorzelec	100

Third Round
(United States) Kayla Harrison	000
(South Korea) Yoon Hyun-ji	010
(Brazil) Mayra Aguiar	000
(Poland) Daria Pogorzelec	011

Quarterfinals
(South Korea) Yoon Hyun-ji	000
(Poland) Daria Pogorzelec	001

=== Pool B ===
First Round		Second Round		Quarterfinals
(Germany) Luise Malzahn	010
(Spain) Marta Tort	000	(Germany) Luise Malzahn	100
(United Kingdom) Natalie Powell	001	(United Kingdom) Natalie Powell	000
(Italy) Assunta Galeone	000			(Germany) Luise Malzahn	000
(Netherlands) Guusje Steenhuis	001			(Japan) Mami Umeki	000
(Kazakhstan) Albina Amangeldiyeva	000	(Netherlands) Guusje Steenhuis	000
(Japan) Mami Umeki	101	(Japan) Mami Umeki	000
(China) Zhang Zhehui	000

=== Pool C ===
First Round		Second Round		Quarterfinals
(France) Audrey Tcheuméo	000
(Cuba) Yalennis Castillo	000	(France) Audrey Tcheuméo	100
(Hungary) Abigél Joó	110	(Hungary) Abigél Joó	000
(Croatia) Ivana Maranić	000			(France) Audrey Tcheuméo	011
(Netherlands) Marhinde Verkerk	000			(Netherlands) Marhinde Verkerk	000
(Spain) Laia Talarn	000	(Netherlands) Marhinde Verkerk	100
(Gabon) Sarah Mazouz	101	(Gabon) Sarah Mazouz	000
(Australia) Miranda Giambelli	000

=== Pool D ===
First Round		Second Round		Quarterfinals
(Slovenia) Anamari Velenšek	101
(Russia) Anastasiya Dmitrieva	000	(Slovenia) Anamari Velenšek	100
(South Korea) Park Yu-jin	100	(South Korea) Park Yu-jin	000
(Portugal) Yahima Ramirez	000			(Slovenia) Anamari Velenšek	001
(North Korea) Sol Kyong	000			(United Kingdom) Gemma Gibbons	000
(Chinese Taipei) Wang Szu-chu	000	(North Korea) Sol Kyong	010
(United Kingdom) Gemma Gibbons	010	(United Kingdom) Gemma Gibbons	100
(United States) Samantha Bleier	000

== Prize money ==
The sums listed bring the total prizes awarded to 14,000$ for the individual event.

Medal	Total	Judoka	Coach
Gold	6,000$	4,800$	1,200$
Silver	4,000$	3,200$	800$
Bronze	2,000$	1,600$	400$
