= Judo at the 2022 Asian Games – Women's 78 kg =

Judo competition

Judo Women's 78 kg at the 2022 Asian Games
- Venue: Xiaoshan Linpu Gymnasium
- Location: Hangzhou, China
- Dates: 26 September 2023
- Nations: 13

Medalists
gold medal	Ma Zhenzhao	China
silver medal	Rika Takayama	Japan
bronze medal	Yoon Hyun-ji	South Korea
bronze medal	Iriskhon Kurbanbaeva	Uzbekistan

Competition at external databases
- Links: IJF • JudoInside

The women's 78 kilograms (half lightweight) competition in Judo at the 2022 Asian Games in Hangzhou was held on 26 September 2023 at the Xiaoshan Linpu Gymnasium.

== Schedule ==
All times are China Standard Time (UTC+08:00)

Date	Time	Event
Tuesday, 26 September 2023	10:00	Elimination round of 16
Tuesday, 26 September 2023	10:00	Quarterfinals
Tuesday, 26 September 2023	10:00	Repechage
Tuesday, 26 September 2023	10:00	Semifinals
Tuesday, 26 September 2023	16:00	Finals

== Results ==
=== Main bracket ===
Round of 16
Indubala Devi Maibam (IND)	00
Ikumi Oeda (THA)	10
Iriskhon Kurbanbaeva (UZB)	10
Kim Kyong-ran (PRK)	00
Aruna Jangeldina (KAZ)	w/o
~~Arwa Al-Yas (YEM)~~
Hsu Wang Shu-huei (TPE)	01 (yellow card)
Shakhida Narmukhanmedova (KGZ)	00
Otgonbayaryn Khüslen (MGL)	10
Dylwynn Keith Gimena (PHI)	00

Quarter-finals
Ma Zhenzhao (CHN)	10
Ikumi Oeda (THA)	00
Iriskhon Kurbanbaeva (UZB)	01
Aruna Jangeldina (KAZ)	00
Rika Takayama (JPN)	10
Hsu Wang Shu-huei (TPE)	00
Yoon Hyun-ji (KOR)	01
Otgonbayaryn Khüslen (MGL)	00

Semi-finals
Ma Zhenzhao (CHN)	10 (yellow card)
Iriskhon Kurbanbaeva (UZB)	00
Rika Takayama (JPN)	11 (yellow card)
Yoon Hyun-ji (KOR)	00 (yellow card)

Gold medal contest
Ma Zhenzhao (CHN)	10
Rika Takayama (JPN)	00

=== Repechage ===
Repechage
Ikumi Oeda (THA)	00 (yellow card)
Aruna Jangeldina (KAZ)	10
Hsu Wang Shu-huei (TPE)	00
Otgonbayaryn Khüslen (MGL)	10

Bronze medal contests
Aruna Jangeldina (KAZ)	00 (yellow card)
Yoon Hyun-ji (KOR)	10 (yellow card)
Otgonbayaryn Khüslen (MGL)	00
Iriskhon Kurbanbaeva (UZB)	10
