= 2017 World Judo Championships – Women's 78 kg =

Judo Women's 78 kg at the 2017 World Judo Championships
- Venue: László Papp Budapest Sports Arena
- Location: Budapest, Hungary
- Dates: 1 September
- Competitors: 31 from 25 nations
- Total prize money: 57,000$

Medalists
gold medal	Mayra Aguiar (2nd title)	Brazil
silver medal	Mami Umeki	Japan
bronze medal	Kaliema Antomarchi	Cuba
bronze medal	Natalie Powell	Great Britain

Competition at external databases
- Links: IJF • JudoInside

The Women's 78 kg competition at the 2017 World Judo Championships was held on 1 September 2017.

== Results ==
=== Finals ===
Semi-finals
(Netherlands) Marhinde Verkerk	00
(Japan) Mami Umeki	01
(Brazil) Mayra Aguiar	01
(Japan) Ruika Sato	00

Final
(Japan) Mami Umeki	00
(Brazil) Mayra Aguiar	01

=== Repechage ===
Repechage
(Italy) Assunta Galeone	00
(Cuba) Kaliema Antomarchi	10

Third place
(Cuba) Kaliema Antomarchi	01
(Japan) Ruika Sato	00

Repechage
(France) Audrey Tcheuméo	00
(United Kingdom) Natalie Powell	10

Third place
(United Kingdom) Natalie Powell	10
(Netherlands) Marhinde Verkerk	00

=== Pool A ===
First round
(Italy) Assunta Galeone	01
(South Korea) Park Yu-jin	00
(Netherlands) Marhinde Verkerk	10
(Kazakhstan) Albina Amangeldiyeva	00
(Poland) Beata Pacut	10
(Venezuela) Karen León	00

Second round
(Netherlands) Guusje Steenhuis	00
(Italy) Assunta Galeone	00
(Netherlands) Marhinde Verkerk	01
(Poland) Beata Pacut	00

Quarterfinals
(Italy) Assunta Galeone	00
(Netherlands) Marhinde Verkerk	00

=== Pool B ===
First round
(Hungary) Abigél Joó	11
(Portugal) Yahima Ramirez	00
(Cuba) Kaliema Antomarchi	12
(Algeria) Kaouthar Oullal	00
(Japan) Mami Umeki	11
(Brazil) Samanta Soares	00
(Cameroon) Audrey Njepang	00
(China) He Huizhen	11

Second round
(Hungary) Abigél Joó	01
(Cuba) Kaliema Antomarchi	11
(Japan) Mami Umeki	10
(China) He Huizhen	00

Quarterfinals
(Cuba) Kaliema Antomarchi	00
(Japan) Mami Umeki	10

=== Pool C ===
First round
(France) Audrey Tcheuméo	11
(Israel) Yarden Mayersohn	00
(Chile) Jacqueline Usnayo	00
(Kazakhstan) Zarina Raifova	01
(Brazil) Mayra Aguiar	10
(Slovenia) Klara Apotekar	00
(Austria) Bernadette Graf	11
(Costa Rica) Diana Brenes	00

Second round
(France) Audrey Tcheuméo	11
(Kazakhstan) Zarina Raifova	00
(Brazil) Mayra Aguiar	10
(Austria) Bernadette Graf	00

Quarterfinals
(France) Audrey Tcheuméo	00
(Brazil) Mayra Aguiar	12

=== Pool D ===
First round
(United Kingdom) Natalie Powell	01
(China) Zhang Kaili	00
(Canada) Ana Laura Portuondo	11
(Hungary) Evelin Salánki	00
(Japan) Ruika Sato	12
(Ukraine) Anastasiya Turchyn	00
(Australia) Melanie Wallis	00
(Germany) Anna-Maria Wagner	01

Second round
(United Kingdom) Natalie Powell	02
(Canada) Ana Laura Portuondo	01
(Japan) Ruika Sato	00
(Germany) Anna-Maria Wagner	00

Quarterfinals
(United Kingdom) Natalie Powell	00
(Japan) Ruika Sato	10

== Prize money ==
The sums listed bring the total prizes awarded to 57,000$ for the individual event.

Medal	Total	Judoka	Coach
Gold	26,000$	20,800$	5,200$
Silver	15,000$	12,000$	3,000$
Bronze	8,000$	6,400$	1,600$
