= 2017 World Judo Championships – Mixed team =

Judo competition

Judo Mixed team at the 2017 World Judo Championships
- Venue: László Papp Budapest Sports Arena
- Location: Budapest, Hungary
- Date: 3 September 2017
- Competitors: 227 from 21 nations
- Total prize money: 200,000$

Medalists
gold medal	Nae Udaka; Tsukasa Yoshida; Soichi Hashimoto; Riki Nakaya; Saki Niizoe; Chizuru Arai; Kenta Nagasawa; Takanori Nagase; Akira Sone; Sarah Asahina; Hisayoshi Harasawa; Takeshi Ojitani	Japan
silver medal	Maria Suelen Altheman; Eduardo Barbosa; Eduardo Bettoni; Marcelo Contini; Érika Miranda; David Moura; Victor Penalber; Maria Portela; Ketleyn Quadros; Rafael Silva; Rafaela Silva; Beatriz Souza	Brazil
bronze medal	Clarisse Agbegnenou; Émilie Andéol; Benjamin Axus; Axel Clerget; Romane Dicko; Pierre Duprat; Marie-Eve Gahié; Priscilla Gneto; Cyrille Maret; Loïc Pietri; Hélène Receveaux; Teddy Riner	France
bronze medal	An Baul; An Chang-rim; Gwak Dong-han; Jeong Hye-jin; Ji Yun-seo; Kim Min-jeong; Kim Sung-min; Kim Seong-yeon; Kwon You-jeong; Lee Jae-yong; Park Yu-jin; Won Jong-hoon	South Korea

Champions
- Mixed team: Japan (1st title)

Competition at external databases
- Links: IJF • EJU • JudoInside

The mixed team competition at the 2017 World Judo Championships was held on 3 September 2017.

== Results ==
=== Finals ===
Semi-finals
Japan	5
South Korea	1
Russia	2
Brazil	4

Final
Japan	6
Brazil	0

=== Repechage ===
Repechage
Germany	2
France	4

Third place
France	5
Russia	1

Repechage
Georgia	2
Canada	4

Third place
Canada	1
South Korea	5

=== Pool A ===
First round
Algeria	1
Ukraine	5

Second round
Japan	5
Ukraine	1
Mongolia	2
Germany	4

Quarterfinals
Japan	5
Germany	1

=== Pool B ===
First round
Kazakhstan	0
Hungary	6
Turkey	0
South Korea	6

Second round
France	4
Hungary	2
Great Britain	2
South Korea	4

Quarterfinals
France	2
South Korea	4

=== Pool C ===
First round
Russia	4
Cuba	2

Second round
Netherlands	2
Russia	4
Georgia	3
Croatia	3

Quarterfinals
Russia	5
Georgia	1

=== Pool D ===
First round
China	2
Poland	4

Second round
Brazil	5
Poland	1
Romania	2
Canada	4

Quarterfinals
Brazil	5
Canada	1

== Prize money ==
The sums listed bring the total prizes awarded to 57,000$ for the individual event.

Medal	Total	Judoka	Coach
Gold	90,000$	72,000$	18,000$
Silver	60,000$	48,000$	12,000$
Bronze	25,000$	20,000$	5,000$
