= Eduardo Bettoni =

Brazilian judoka (born 1990)

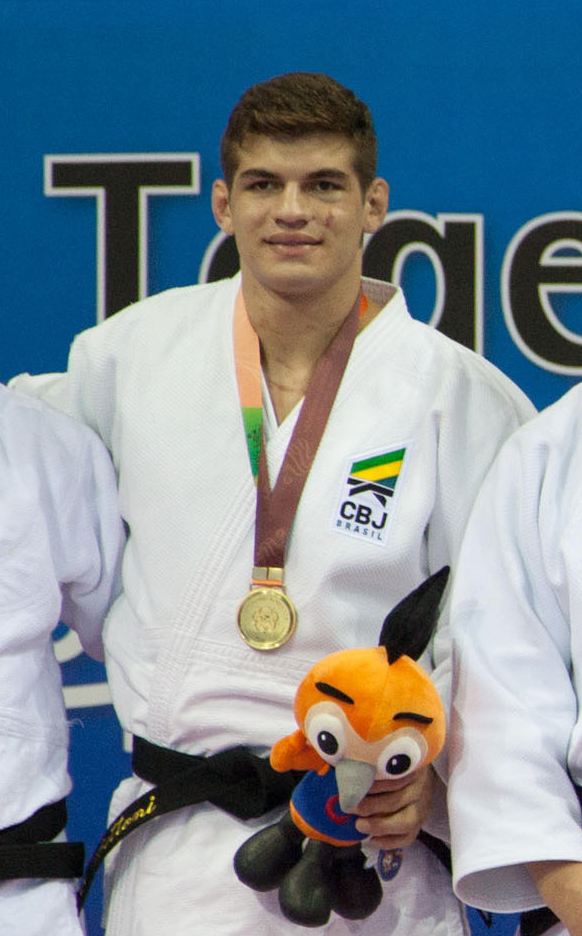
- Bettoni at the 2015 Military World Games

Personal information
- Born: 27 July 1990 (age 35) Maringá, Paraná
- Occupation: Judoka

Sport
- Country: Brazil
- Sport: Judo
- Weight class: ‍–‍90 kg

Achievements and titles
- Pan American Champ.: (2012)
Medal record
Men's judo
Representing Brazil
World Championships
Silver medal – second place	2017 Budapest	Mixed team
Pan American Championships
Bronze medal – third place	2012 Montreal	‍–‍90 kg
IJF Grand Slam
Bronze medal – third place	2012 Rio de Janeiro	‍–‍90 kg
Summer Universiade
Bronze medal – third place	2013 Kazan	Men's team
Military World Games
Gold medal – first place	2015 Mungyeong	‍–‍90 kg
Gold medal – first place	2015 Mungyeong	Team

Profile at external databases
- IJF: 7530
- JudoInside.com: 57197
- Updated on 27 November 2022

Eduardo Bettoni (born 27 July 1990) is a Brazilian heavyweight judoka. Competing in the 90 kg division he won a bronze medal at the 2012 Pan American Championships.
