= Rim Song-sim =

North Korean judoka (born 1995)

Personal information
- Born: 6 August 1995 (age 30)
- Occupation: Judoka

Sport
- Country: North Korea
- Sport: Judo
- Weight class: ‍–‍52 kg

Achievements and titles
- World Champ.: R32 (2013, 2014, 2015)
- Asian Champ.: (bronze) (2015, 2018, 2019)
Medal record
Women's judo
Representing North Korea
Asian Games
| Bronze medal – third place | 2018 Jakarta | ‍–‍52 kg |
Asian Championships
| Bronze medal – third place | 2015 Kuwait City | ‍–‍52 kg |
| Bronze medal – third place | 2019 Fujairah | ‍–‍52 kg |
IJF Grand Prix
| Gold medal – first place | 2017 Hohhot | ‍–‍52 kg |
Asian Junior Championships
| Bronze medal – third place | 2012 Taipei | ‍–‍48 kg |
| Bronze medal – third place | 2013 Hainan | ‍–‍48 kg |
Asian Cadet Championships
| Gold medal – first place | 2011 Beirut | ‍–‍48 kg |

Profile at external databases
- IJF: 13778
- JudoInside.com: 81158
- Updated on 7 December 2022

Rim Song-sim (born 6 August 1995) is a North Korean judoka. She is a bronze medalist at the 2018 Asian Games. She competed at the World Judo Championships in 2014, 2015, 2017 and 2018.

== Career ==
In 2018, she won one of the bronze medals in the women's 52 kg event at the 2018 Asian Games held in Jakarta, Indonesia. In 2019, she won one of the bronze medals in the women's –52 kg event at the 2019 Asian-Pacific Judo Championships held in Fujairah, United Arab Emirates.

== Achievements ==
| Year | Tournament | Place | Weight class |
|---|---|---|---|
| 2018 | Asian Games | 3rd | −52 kg |
