= 2015 Judo Grand Prix Qingdao =

Judo competition

Judo 2015 Judo Grand Prix Qingdao
- Venue: Guoxin Gymnasium
- Location: Qingdao, China
- Dates: 20–22 November 2015
- Competitors: 373 from 59 nations

Competition at external databases
- Links: IJF • EJU • JudoInside

The 2015 Judo Grand Prix Qingdao was held at the Guoxin Gymnasium in Qingdao, China from 20 to 22 November 2015.

== Medal summary ==
=== Men's events ===
Event	Gold	Silver	Bronze
Extra-lightweight (−60 kg)	Ilgar Mushkiyev (AZE)	Jeroen Mooren (NED)	Sharafuddin Lutfillaev (UZB)
Extra-lightweight (−60 kg)	Ilgar Mushkiyev (AZE)	Jeroen Mooren (NED)	Walide Khyar (FRA)
Half-lightweight (−66 kg)	Nijat Shikhalizada (AZE)	Davaadorjiin Tömörkhüleg (MGL)	Kim Lim-hwan (KOR)
Half-lightweight (−66 kg)	Nijat Shikhalizada (AZE)	Davaadorjiin Tömörkhüleg (MGL)	Kengo Takaichi (JPN)
Lightweight (−73 kg)	Soichi Hashimoto (JPN)	Rustam Orujov (AZE)	Mirali Sharipov (UZB)
Lightweight (−73 kg)	Soichi Hashimoto (JPN)	Rustam Orujov (AZE)	Kim Chol-gwang (PRK)
Half-middleweight (−81 kg)	Wang Ki-chun (KOR)	Goki Maruyama (JPN)	Otgonbaataryn Uuganbaatar (MGL)
Half-middleweight (−81 kg)	Wang Ki-chun (KOR)	Goki Maruyama (JPN)	Ivaylo Ivanov (BUL)
Middleweight (−90 kg)	Kenta Nagasawa (JPN)	Asley González (CUB)	Alexandre Iddir (FRA)
Middleweight (−90 kg)	Kenta Nagasawa (JPN)	Asley González (CUB)	Ramin Gurbanov (AZE)
Half-heavyweight (−100 kg)	Naidangiin Tüvshinbayar (MGL)	Maxim Rakov (KAZ)	Elmar Gasimov (AZE)
Half-heavyweight (−100 kg)	Naidangiin Tüvshinbayar (MGL)	Maxim Rakov (KAZ)	Elkhan Mammadov (AZE)
Heavyweight (+100 kg)	Teddy Riner (FRA)	Kim Sung-min (KOR)	Oleksandr Gordiienko (UKR)
Heavyweight (+100 kg)	Teddy Riner (FRA)	Kim Sung-min (KOR)	Katsuma Ueda (JPN)

=== Women's events ===
Event	Gold	Silver	Bronze
Extra-lightweight (−48 kg)	Funa Tonaki (JPN)	Mönkhbatyn Urantsetseg (MGL)	Ebru Şahin (TUR)
Extra-lightweight (−48 kg)	Funa Tonaki (JPN)	Mönkhbatyn Urantsetseg (MGL)	Otgontsetseg Galbadrakh (KAZ)
Half-lightweight (−52 kg)	Yuka Nishida (JPN)	Gülbadam Babamuratowa (TKM)	Ma Yingnan (CHN)
Half-lightweight (−52 kg)	Yuka Nishida (JPN)	Gülbadam Babamuratowa (TKM)	Adiyaasambuugiin Tsolmon (MGL)
Lightweight (−57 kg)	Dorjsürengiin Sumiyaa (MGL)	Miryam Roper (GER)	Anzu Yamamoto (JPN)
Lightweight (−57 kg)	Dorjsürengiin Sumiyaa (MGL)	Miryam Roper (GER)	Liu Yang (CHN)
Half-middleweight (−63 kg)	Yang Junxia (CHN)	Büşra Katipoğlu (TUR)	Maricet Espinosa (CUB)
Half-middleweight (−63 kg)	Yang Junxia (CHN)	Büşra Katipoğlu (TUR)	Bak Ji-yun (KOR)
Middleweight (−70 kg)	Barbara Matić (CRO)	Iljana Marzok (GER)	Kim Seong-yeon (KOR)
Middleweight (−70 kg)	Barbara Matić (CRO)	Iljana Marzok (GER)	Katarzyna Kłys (POL)
Half-heavyweight (−78 kg)	Shori Hamada (JPN)	Audrey Tcheuméo (FRA)	Kayla Harrison (USA)
Half-heavyweight (−78 kg)	Shori Hamada (JPN)	Audrey Tcheuméo (FRA)	Gemma Gibbons (GBR)
Heavyweight (+78 kg)	Yu Song (CHN)	Ma Sisi (CHN)	Svitlana Iaromka (UKR)
Heavyweight (+78 kg)	Yu Song (CHN)	Ma Sisi (CHN)	Kim Min-jeong (KOR)

Source Results

=== Medal table ===
* Host nation (China)

Rank	Nation	Gold	Silver	Bronze	Total
1	Japan (JPN)	5	1	3	9
2	Mongolia (MGL)	2	2	2	6
3	Azerbaijan (AZE)	2	1	3	6
4	China (CHN)*	2	1	2	5
5	South Korea (KOR)	1	1	4	6
6	France (FRA)	1	1	2	4
7	Croatia (CRO)	1	0	0	1
8	Germany (GER)	0	2	0	2
9	Cuba (CUB)	0	1	1	2
9	Kazakhstan (KAZ)	0	1	1	2
9	Turkey (TUR)	0	1	1	2
12	Netherlands (NED)	0	1	0	1
12	Turkmenistan (TKM)	0	1	0	1
14	Ukraine (UKR)	0	0	2	2
14	Uzbekistan (UZB)	0	0	2	2
16	Bulgaria (BUL)	0	0	1	1
16	Great Britain (GBR)	0	0	1	1
16	North Korea (PRK)	0	0	1	1
16	Poland (POL)	0	0	1	1
16	United States (USA)	0	0	1	1
Totals (20 entries)		14	14	28	56
