= 2019 Judo Grand Prix Budapest =

Judo competition

Judo 2019 Judo Grand Prix Budapest
- Venue: László Papp Budapest Sports Arena
- Location: Budapest, Hungary
- Dates: 12–14 July 2019
- Competitors: 542 from 81 nations

Competition at external databases
- Links: IJF • EJU • JudoInside

The 2019 Judo Grand Prix was held in Budapest, Hungary, from 12 to 14 July 2019.

== Medal summary ==
=== Men's events ===
Event	Gold	Silver	Bronze
Extra-lightweight (−60 kg)	Yeldos Smetov (KAZ)	Ganbatyn Boldbaatar (MGL)	Yang Yung-wei (TPE)
Extra-lightweight (−60 kg)	Yeldos Smetov (KAZ)	Ganbatyn Boldbaatar (MGL)	Tornike Tsjakadoea (NED)
Half-lightweight (−66 kg)	Ganboldyn Kherlen (MGL)	Yeldos Zhumakanov (KAZ)	Shakhram Akhadov (UZB)
Half-lightweight (−66 kg)	Ganboldyn Kherlen (MGL)	Yeldos Zhumakanov (KAZ)	Mikhail Pulyaev (RUS)
Lightweight (−73 kg)	Akil Gjakova (KOS)	Georgii Elbakiev (RUS)	Telman Valiyev (AZE)
Lightweight (−73 kg)	Akil Gjakova (KOS)	Georgii Elbakiev (RUS)	Khikmatillokh Turaev (UZB)
Half-middleweight (−81 kg)	Tato Grigalashvili (GEO)	Joao Macedo (BRA)	Attila Ungvári (HUN)
Half-middleweight (−81 kg)	Tato Grigalashvili (GEO)	Joao Macedo (BRA)	Ivaylo Ivanov (BUL)
Middleweight (−90 kg)	Nikoloz Sherazadishvili (ESP)	Shoichiro Mukai (JPN)	Iván Felipe Silva Morales (CUB)
Middleweight (−90 kg)	Nikoloz Sherazadishvili (ESP)	Shoichiro Mukai (JPN)	Beka Gviniashvili (GEO)
Half-heavyweight (−100 kg)	Aaron Wolf (JPN)	Grigori Minaškin (EST)	Cho Gu-ham (KOR)
Half-heavyweight (−100 kg)	Aaron Wolf (JPN)	Grigori Minaškin (EST)	Simeon Catharina (NED)
Heavyweight (+100 kg)	Or Sasson (ISR)	Kokoro Kageura (JPN)	Gela Zaalishvili (GEO)
Heavyweight (+100 kg)	Or Sasson (ISR)	Kokoro Kageura (JPN)	Richárd Sipőcz (HUN)

=== Women's events ===
Event	Gold	Silver	Bronze
Extra-lightweight (−48 kg)	Funa Tonaki (JPN)	Distria Krasniqi (KOS)	Julia Figueroa (ESP)
Extra-lightweight (−48 kg)	Funa Tonaki (JPN)	Distria Krasniqi (KOS)	Maryna Cherniak (UKR)
Half-lightweight (−52 kg)	Chishima Maeda (JPN)	Fabienne Kocher (SUI)	Andreea Chițu (ROU)
Half-lightweight (−52 kg)	Chishima Maeda (JPN)	Fabienne Kocher (SUI)	Ana Pérez Box (ESP)
Lightweight (−57 kg)	Rafaela Silva (BRA)	Nora Gjakova (KOS)	Sabrina Filzmoser (AUT)
Lightweight (−57 kg)	Rafaela Silva (BRA)	Nora Gjakova (KOS)	Hedvig Karakas (HUN)
Half-middleweight (−63 kg)	Masako Doi (JPN)	Ketleyn Quadros (BRA)	Maylín del Toro Carvajal (CUB)
Half-middleweight (−63 kg)	Masako Doi (JPN)	Ketleyn Quadros (BRA)	Yang Junxia (CHN)
Middleweight (−70 kg)	Gemma Howell (GBR)	María Bernabéu (ESP)	Elisavet Teltsidou (GRE)
Middleweight (−70 kg)	Gemma Howell (GBR)	María Bernabéu (ESP)	Kelita Zupancic (CAN)
Half-heavyweight (−78 kg)	Mayra Aguiar (BRA)	Ruika Sato (JPN)	Kaliema Antomarchi (CUB)
Half-heavyweight (−78 kg)	Mayra Aguiar (BRA)	Ruika Sato (JPN)	Natalie Powell (GBR)
Heavyweight (+78 kg)	Wakaba Tomita (JPN)	Nihel Cheikh Rouhou (TUN)	Idalys Ortiz (CUB)
Heavyweight (+78 kg)	Wakaba Tomita (JPN)	Nihel Cheikh Rouhou (TUN)	Wang Yan (CHN)

Source Results

=== Medal table ===
* Host nation (Hungary)

Rank	Nation	Gold	Silver	Bronze	Total
1	Japan (JPN)	5	3	0	8
2	Brazil (BRA)	2	2	0	4
3	Kosovo (KOS)	1	2	0	3
4	Spain (ESP)	1	1	2	4
5	Kazakhstan (KAZ)	1	1	0	2
5	Mongolia (MGL)	1	1	0	2
7	Georgia (GEO)	1	0	2	3
8	Great Britain (GBR)	1	0	1	2
9	Israel (ISR)	1	0	0	1
10	Russia (RUS)	0	1	1	2
11	Estonia (EST)	0	1	0	1
11	Switzerland (SUI)	0	1	0	1
11	Tunisia (TUN)	0	1	0	1
14	Cuba (CUB)	0	0	4	4
15	Hungary (HUN)*	0	0	3	3
16	China (CHN)	0	0	2	2
16	Netherlands (NED)	0	0	2	2
16	Uzbekistan (UZB)	0	0	2	2
19	Austria (AUT)	0	0	1	1
19	Azerbaijan (AZE)	0	0	1	1
19	Bulgaria (BUL)	0	0	1	1
19	Canada (CAN)	0	0	1	1
19	Chinese Taipei (TPE)	0	0	1	1
19	Greece (GRE)	0	0	1	1
19	Romania (ROU)	0	0	1	1
19	South Korea (KOR)	0	0	1	1
19	Ukraine (UKR)	0	0	1	1
Totals (27 entries)		14	14	28	56
