= Judo at the 2016 Summer Olympics – Women's 52 kg =

Women's 52 kg at the Games of the XXXI Olympiad
- Venue: Carioca Arena 2
- Date: 7 August 2016
- Competitors: 22 from 22 nations

Medalists
1st place, gold medalist(s)		Majlinda Kelmendi	Kosovo
2nd place, silver medalist(s)		Odette Giuffrida	Italy
3rd place, bronze medalist(s)		Misato Nakamura	Japan
3rd place, bronze medalist(s)		Natalia Kuziutina	Russia

The women's 52 kg competition in judo at the 2016 Summer Olympics in Rio de Janeiro was held on 7 August at the Carioca Arena 2.

The gold and silver medals were determined by a single-elimination tournament, with the winner of the final taking gold and the loser receiving silver. Judo events awarded two bronze medals. Quarterfinal losers competed in a repechage match for the right to face a semifinal loser for a bronze medal (that is, the judokas defeated in quarterfinals A and B competed against each other, with the winner of that match facing the semifinal loser from the other half of the bracket).

The medals for the competition were presented by Thomas Bach, Germany, president of the International Olympic Committee and the gifts were presented by Marius Vizer, president of the International Judo Federation.

A controversy emerged that Joud Fahmy from Saudi Arabia gave up of her first round fight to avoid facing Israeli Gili Cohen. The Saudi Olympic team dismissed the controversy and tweeted that Fahmy had sustained injuries to her arm and leg during training and was advised by medical staff not to compete.

== Results ==
=== Finals ===
Semi-finals
Odette Giuffrida (ITA)	000
Ma Yingnan (CHN)	000
Majlinda Kelmendi (KOS)	000
Misato Nakamura (JPN)	000

Final
Odette Giuffrida (ITA)	000
Majlinda Kelmendi (KOS)	001

=== Repechages ===
Repechage		Bronze medal
Andreea Chițu (ROU)	010
Érika Miranda (BRA)	100	Érika Miranda (BRA)	000
		Misato Nakamura (JPN)	001

Repechage		Bronze medal
Christianne Legentil (MRI)	000
Natalia Kuziutina (RUS)	100	Natalia Kuziutina (RUS)	100
		Ma Yingnan (CHN)	000

=== Pool A ===
First round
Laura Gómez (ESP)	101
Gulbadam Babamuratova (TKM)	000
Darya Skrypnik (BLR)	001
Mareen Kräh (GER)	011

Second round
Andreea Chițu (ROU)	101
Laura Gómez (ESP)	000
Odette Giuffrida (ITA)	001
Mareen Kräh (GER)	000

Quarterfinals
Andreea Chițu (ROU)	000
Odette Giuffrida (ITA)	001

=== Pool B ===
First round
Joana Ramos (POR)	102
Antoinette Gasongo (BDI)	000

Second round
Érika Miranda (BRA)	100
Hela Ayari (TUN)	000
Ma Yingnan (CHN)	100
Joana Ramos (POR)	000

Quarterfinals
Érika Miranda (BRA)	000
Ma Yingnan (CHN)	010

=== Pool C ===
First round
Priscilla Gneto (FRA)	000
Evelyne Tschopp (SUI)	100
Christianne Legentil (MRI)	100
Joud Fahmy (KSA)	000

Second round
Majlinda Kelmendi (KOS)	100
Evelyne Tschopp (SUI)	000
Gili Cohen (ISR)	000
Christianne Legentil (MRI)	001

Quarterfinals
Majlinda Kelmendi (KOS)	000
Christianne Legentil (MRI)	000

=== Pool D ===
First round		Second round		Quarterfinals
		Misato Nakamura (JPN)	100
Angelica Delgado (USA)	003	Adiyaasambuugiin Tsolmon (MGL)	000
Adiyaasambuugiin Tsolmon (MGL)	010			Misato Nakamura (JPN)	100
				Natalia Kuziutina (RUS)	000
		Natalia Kuziutina (RUS)	002
		Ecaterina Guica (CAN)	000
