= 2014 Judo Grand Prix Ulaanbaatar =

Judo competition in Ulaanbaatar, Mongolia

Judo 2014 Judo Grand Prix Ulaanbaatar
- Location: Ulaanbaatar, Mongolia
- Dates: 4–6 July 2014
- Competitors: 282 from 27 nations

Competition at external databases
- Links: IJF • EJU • JudoInside

The 2014 Judo Grand Prix Ulaanbaatar was held in Ulaanbaatar, Mongolia from 4 to 6 July 2014.

== Medal summary ==
=== Men's events ===
Event	Gold	Silver	Bronze
Extra-lightweight (−60 kg)	Ganbatyn Boldbaatar (MGL)	Eric Takabatake (BRA)	Ryō Kawabata (JPN)
Extra-lightweight (−60 kg)	Ganbatyn Boldbaatar (MGL)	Eric Takabatake (BRA)	Toru Shishime (JPN)
Half-lightweight (−66 kg)	Tomofumi Takajo (JPN)	Davaadorjiin Tömörkhüleg (MGL)	Dovdony Altansükh (MGL)
Half-lightweight (−66 kg)	Tomofumi Takajo (JPN)	Davaadorjiin Tömörkhüleg (MGL)	Sho Tateyama (JPN)
Lightweight (−73 kg)	Nugzar Tatalashvili (GEO)	Khashbaataryn Tsagaanbaatar (MGL)	Hong Kuk-hyon (PRK)
Lightweight (−73 kg)	Nugzar Tatalashvili (GEO)	Khashbaataryn Tsagaanbaatar (MGL)	Takenori Nakamura (JPN)
Half-middleweight (−81 kg)	Keita Nagashima (JPN)	Wang Ki-chun (KOR)	Łukasz Błach (POL)
Half-middleweight (−81 kg)	Keita Nagashima (JPN)	Wang Ki-chun (KOR)	Amir Ghaseminejad (IRI)
Middleweight (−90 kg)	Beka Gviniashvili (GEO)	Krisztián Tóth (HUN)	Kirill Denisov (RUS)
Middleweight (−90 kg)	Beka Gviniashvili (GEO)	Krisztián Tóth (HUN)	Shohei Shimowada (JPN)
Half-heavyweight (−100 kg)	Tagir Khaybulaev (RUS)	Karl-Richard Frey (GER)	Flavio Orlik (SUI)
Half-heavyweight (−100 kg)	Tagir Khaybulaev (RUS)	Karl-Richard Frey (GER)	Dimitri Peters (GER)
Heavyweight (+100 kg)	Ryu Shichinohe (JPN)	Adam Okruashvili (GEO)	Levani Matiashvili (GEO)
Heavyweight (+100 kg)	Ryu Shichinohe (JPN)	Adam Okruashvili (GEO)	Daniel Natea (ROU)

=== Women's events ===
Event	Gold	Silver	Bronze
Extra-lightweight (−48 kg)	Mönkhbatyn Urantsetseg (MGL)	Jeong Bo-kyeong (KOR)	Otgontsetseg Galbadrakh (MGL)
Extra-lightweight (−48 kg)	Mönkhbatyn Urantsetseg (MGL)	Jeong Bo-kyeong (KOR)	Wu Shugen (CHN)
Half-lightweight (−52 kg)	Ma Yingnan (CHN)	Mareen Kräh (GER)	Adiyaasambuugiin Tsolmon (MGL)
Half-lightweight (−52 kg)	Ma Yingnan (CHN)	Mareen Kräh (GER)	Mönkhbaataryn Bundmaa (MGL)
Lightweight (−57 kg)	Catherine Beauchemin-Pinard (CAN)	Makiko Otomo (JPN)	Telma Monteiro (POR)
Lightweight (−57 kg)	Catherine Beauchemin-Pinard (CAN)	Makiko Otomo (JPN)	Tina Zeltner (AUT)
Half-middleweight (−63 kg)	Yang Junxia (CHN)	Joung Da-woon (KOR)	Martyna Trajdos (GER)
Half-middleweight (−63 kg)	Yang Junxia (CHN)	Joung Da-woon (KOR)	Marian Urdabayeva (KAZ)
Middleweight (−70 kg)	Naranjargal Tsend-Ayush (MGL)	Hwang Ye-sul (KOR)	Maria Portela (BRA)
Middleweight (−70 kg)	Naranjargal Tsend-Ayush (MGL)	Hwang Ye-sul (KOR)	Esther Stam (GEO)
Half-heavyweight (−78 kg)	Sol Kyong (PRK)	Luise Malzahn (GER)	Abigél Joó (HUN)
Half-heavyweight (−78 kg)	Sol Kyong (PRK)	Luise Malzahn (GER)	Catherine Roberge (CAN)
Heavyweight (+78 kg)	Kim Min-jeong (KOR)	Gülşah Kocatürk (TUR)	Franziska Konitz (GER)
Heavyweight (+78 kg)	Kim Min-jeong (KOR)	Gülşah Kocatürk (TUR)	Jasmin Grabowski (GER)

Source Results

=== Medal table ===
* Host nation (Mongolia)

Rank	Nation	Gold	Silver	Bronze	Total
1	Mongolia (MGL)*	3	2	4	9
2	Japan (JPN)	3	1	5	9
3	Georgia (GEO)	2	1	2	5
4	China (CHN)	2	0	1	3
5	South Korea (KOR)	1	4	0	5
6	Canada (CAN)	1	0	1	2
6	North Korea (PRK)	1	0	1	2
6	Russia (RUS)	1	0	1	2
9	Germany (GER)	0	3	4	7
10	Brazil (BRA)	0	1	1	2
10	Hungary (HUN)	0	1	1	2
12	Turkey (TUR)	0	1	0	1
13	Austria (AUT)	0	0	1	1
13	Iran (IRI)	0	0	1	1
13	Kazakhstan (KAZ)	0	0	1	1
13	Poland (POL)	0	0	1	1
13	Portugal (POR)	0	0	1	1
13	Romania (ROU)	0	0	1	1
13	Switzerland (SUI)	0	0	1	1
Totals (19 entries)		14	14	28	56
