= Tetiana Levytska-Shukvani =

Georgian judoka (born 1990)

Personal information
- Nationality: Georgian
- Born: 7 April 1990 (age 36)
- Occupation: Judoka

Sport
- Country: Ukraine (2010–15); Georgia (2019–present)
- Sport: Judo
- Weight class: –52 kg

Achievements and titles
- Olympic Games: R16 (2020)
- World Champ.: R16 (2014, 2015)
- European Champ.: 7th (2015)
Medal record
Women's judo
Representing Ukraine
IJF Grand Prix
| Bronze medal – third place | 2014 Tbilisi | –52 kg |
Summer Universiade
| Bronze medal – third place | 2015 Gwangju | –52 kg |

Profile at external databases
- IJF: 49377, 1157
- JudoInside.com: 42722
- Updated on 26 December 2022

Tetiana Levytska-Shukvani (born 7 April 1990) is a Ukrainian-born Georgian judoka.

She is the bronze medallist of the 2014 Judo Grand Prix Tbilisi in the -52 kg category for Ukraine. However, she married a Georgian judoka and switched nationality to Georgia and is scheduled to participate for Georgia at the 2020 Summer Olympics.
