= Judo at the 2018 Asian Games – Women's 52 kg =

Judo competition

Women's 52 kg at the 2018 Asian Games
- Venue: Jakarta Convention Center
- Date: 29 August 2018
- Competitors: 17 from 17 nations

Medalists
| gold medal | Natsumi Tsunoda | Japan |
| silver medal | Park Da-sol | South Korea |
| bronze medal | Kachakorn Warasiha | Thailand |
| bronze medal | Rim Song-sim | North Korea |

The women's 52 kilograms (Half lightweight) competition at the 2018 Asian Games in Jakarta was held on 29 August at the Jakarta Convention Center Assembly Hall.

== Schedule ==
All times are Western Indonesia Time (UTC+07:00)

| Date | Time | Event |
|---|---|---|
| Wednesday, 29 August 2018 | 09:00 | Elimination round of 32 |
| Wednesday, 29 August 2018 | 09:00 | Elimination round of 16 |
| Wednesday, 29 August 2018 | 09:00 | Quarterfinals |
| Wednesday, 29 August 2018 | 09:00 | Repechage |
| Wednesday, 29 August 2018 | 09:00 | Semifinals |
| Wednesday, 29 August 2018 | 16:00 | Finals |

== Results ==
=== Main bracket ===
==== Final ====
| Gold medal contest |
| Natsumi Tsunoda (JPN) | 11 |
| Park Da-sol (KOR) | 00 |

==== Top half ====
Elimination round of 32
Chen Chin-ying (TPE) | 11
Vong Chi Ieng (MAC) | 00

Elimination round of 16
Natsumi Tsunoda (JPN) | 10
Devika Khadka (NEP) | 00
Nguyễn Thị Thanh Thúy (VIE) | 00
Chen Chin-ying (TPE) | 01
Wang Xin (CHN) | 00
Kachakorn Warasiha (THA) | 10
Rim Song-sim (PRK) | 11
Kamshat Karassaikyzy (KAZ) | 00

Quarterfinals
Natsumi Tsunoda (JPN) | 10
Chen Chin-ying (TPE) | 00
Kachakorn Warasiha (THA) | 00
Rim Song-sim (PRK) | 10

Semifinals
Natsumi Tsunoda (JPN) | 10
Rim Song-sim (PRK) | 00

==== Bottom half ====
Elimination round of 32

Elimination round of 16
Gülbadam Babamuratowa (TKM) | 01
Kseniia Beldiagina (KGZ) | 00
Tsui Shuk-ki (HKG) | 00
Ganboldyn Gantsetseg (MGL) | 10
Park Da-sol (KOR) | 10
Amanah Nur Istiqomah (INA) | 00
Kalpana Devi Thoudam (IND) | 00
Gulnoza Ziyaeva (UZB) | 10

Quarterfinals
Gülbadam Babamuratowa (TKM) | 00
Ganboldyn Gantsetseg (MGL) | 11
Park Da-sol (KOR) | 10
Gulnoza Ziyaeva (UZB) | 00

Semifinals
Ganboldyn Gantsetseg (MGL) | 00
Park Da-sol (KOR) | 10

=== Repechage ===
Repechage
Chen Chin-ying (TPE) | 00
Kachakorn Warasiha (THA) | 10
Gülbadam Babamuratowa (TKM) | 00
Gulnoza Ziyaeva (UZB) | 10

Bronze medal contests
Kachakorn Warasiha (THA) | 01
Ganboldyn Gantsetseg (MGL) | 00
Gulnoza Ziyaeva (UZB) | 00
Rim Song-sim (PRK) | 01
