= Park Yu-jin =

South Korean judoka (born 1993)

Personal information
- Born: 25 June 1993 (age 33)
- Occupation: Judoka

Sport
- Country: South Korea
- Sport: Judo
- Weight class: ‍–‍78 kg

Achievements and titles
- World Champ.: R16 (2015)
- Asian Champ.: (silver) (2018)
Medal record
Women's judo
Representing South Korea
World Championships
Bronze medal – third place	2017 Budapest	Mixed team
Asian Games
Silver medal – second place	2018 Jakarta	‍–‍78 kg
Asian Championships
Bronze medal – third place	2017 Hong Kong	‍–‍78 kg
IJF Grand Slam
Silver medal – second place	2016 Tokyo	‍–‍78 kg
IJF Grand Prix
Bronze medal – third place	2016 Ulaanbaatar	‍–‍78 kg
Summer Universiade
Bronze medal – third place	2015 Gwangju	‍–‍78 kg

Profile at external databases
- IJF: 15228
- JudoInside.com: 14976
- Updated on 25 November 2022

Park Yu-jin (born 25 June 1993) is a South Korean judoka. She won the silver medal in the women's 78 kg event at the 2018 Asian Games held in Jakarta, Indonesia.

At the 2017 World Judo Championships held in Budapest, Hungary, Park won a bronze medals in the mixed team event. She also competed in the women's 78 kg event where she was eliminated in her first match.
