= 2013 Judo Grand Slam Tokyo =

Judo competition

Judo 2013 Judo Grand Slam Tokyo
- Location: Tokyo, Japan
- Dates: 29 November – 1 December 2013
- Competitors: 334 from 46 nations

Competition at external databases
- Links: IJF • JudoInside

The 2013 Judo Grand Slam Tokyo was held in Tokyo, Japan, from 29 November to 1 December 2013.

== Medal summary ==
=== Men's events ===
Event	Gold	Silver	Bronze
Extra-lightweight (−60 kg)	Naohisa Takato (JPN)	Kim Won-jin (KOR)	Shinji Kido (JPN)
Extra-lightweight (−60 kg)	Naohisa Takato (JPN)	Kim Won-jin (KOR)	Toru Shishime (JPN)
Half-lightweight (−66 kg)	Tomofumi Takajo (JPN)	Charles Chibana (BRA)	David Larose (FRA)
Half-lightweight (−66 kg)	Tomofumi Takajo (JPN)	Charles Chibana (BRA)	Ren Miyazaki (JPN)
Lightweight (−73 kg)	Riki Nakaya (JPN)	Bang Gui-man (KOR)	Rok Drakšič (SLO)
Lightweight (−73 kg)	Riki Nakaya (JPN)	Bang Gui-man (KOR)	Denis Iartsev (RUS)
Half-middleweight (−81 kg)	Takanori Nagase (JPN)	Loïc Pietri (FRA)	Takahiro Nakai (JPN)
Half-middleweight (−81 kg)	Takanori Nagase (JPN)	Loïc Pietri (FRA)	Avtandili Tchrikishvili (GEO)
Middleweight (−90 kg)	Mashu Baker (JPN)	Lee Kyu-won (KOR)	Varlam Liparteliani (GEO)
Middleweight (−90 kg)	Mashu Baker (JPN)	Lee Kyu-won (KOR)	Daiki Nishiyama (JPN)
Half-heavyweight (−100 kg)	Lukáš Krpálek (CZE)	Kyle Reyes (CAN)	Cyrille Maret (FRA)
Half-heavyweight (−100 kg)	Lukáš Krpálek (CZE)	Kyle Reyes (CAN)	Naidangiin Tüvshinbayar (MGL)
Heavyweight (+100 kg)	Kim Sung-min (KOR)	Rafael Silva (BRA)	Hisayoshi Harasawa (JPN)
Heavyweight (+100 kg)	Kim Sung-min (KOR)	Rafael Silva (BRA)	Masaru Momose (JPN)

=== Women's events ===
Event	Gold	Silver	Bronze
Extra-lightweight (−48 kg)	Ami Kondo (JPN)	Mönkhbatyn Urantsetseg (MGL)	Sarah Menezes (BRA)
Extra-lightweight (−48 kg)	Ami Kondo (JPN)	Mönkhbatyn Urantsetseg (MGL)	Emi Yamagishi (JPN)
Half-lightweight (−52 kg)	Yuki Hashimoto (JPN)	Érika Miranda (BRA)	Andreea Chițu (ROU)
Half-lightweight (−52 kg)	Yuki Hashimoto (JPN)	Érika Miranda (BRA)	Ai Shishime (JPN)
Lightweight (−57 kg)	Nae Udaka (JPN)	Marti Malloy (USA)	Christa Deguchi (JPN)
Lightweight (−57 kg)	Nae Udaka (JPN)	Marti Malloy (USA)	Anzu Yamamoto (JPN)
Half-middleweight (−63 kg)	Kana Abe (JPN)	Miku Tashiro (JPN)	Joung Da-woon (KOR)
Half-middleweight (−63 kg)	Kana Abe (JPN)	Miku Tashiro (JPN)	Miki Tanaka (JPN)
Middleweight (−70 kg)	Chizuru Arai (JPN)	Kim Polling (NED)	Yuri Alvear (COL)
Middleweight (−70 kg)	Chizuru Arai (JPN)	Kim Polling (NED)	Kim Seong-yeon (KOR)
Half-heavyweight (−78 kg)	Marhinde Verkerk (NED)	Jeong Gyeong-mi (KOR)	Tomomi Okamura (JPN)
Half-heavyweight (−78 kg)	Marhinde Verkerk (NED)	Jeong Gyeong-mi (KOR)	Ruika Sato (JPN)
Heavyweight (+78 kg)	Megumi Tachimoto (JPN)	Kanae Yamabe (JPN)	Idalys Ortiz (CUB)
Heavyweight (+78 kg)	Megumi Tachimoto (JPN)	Kanae Yamabe (JPN)	Qin Qian (CHN)

Source Results

=== Medal table ===
* Host nation (Japan)

Rank	Nation	Gold	Silver	Bronze	Total
1	Japan (JPN)*	11	2	14	27
2	South Korea (KOR)	1	4	2	7
3	Netherlands (NED)	1	1	0	2
4	Czech Republic (CZE)	1	0	0	1
5	Brazil (BRA)	0	3	1	4
6	France (FRA)	0	1	2	3
7	Mongolia (MGL)	0	1	1	2
8	Canada (CAN)	0	1	0	1
8	United States (USA)	0	1	0	1
10	Georgia (GEO)	0	0	2	2
11	China (CHN)	0	0	1	1
11	Colombia (COL)	0	0	1	1
11	Cuba (CUB)	0	0	1	1
11	Romania (ROU)	0	0	1	1
11	Russia (RUS)	0	0	1	1
11	Slovenia (SLO)	0	0	1	1
Totals (16 entries)		14	14	28	56
