= Kachakorn Warasiha =

Thai judoka (born 1994)

Personal information
- Born: 27 June 1994 (age 32)

Sport
- Country: Thailand
- Sport: Judo
- Weight class: 52 kg
Medal record
Women's judo
Representing Thailand
Asian Games
Bronze medal – third place	2018 Jakarta	52 kg
Southeast Asian Games
Gold medal – first place	2019 Philippines	52 kg

Kachakorn Warasiha (born 27 June 1994) is a Thai judoka. She is a gold medalist in the women's 52 kg event at the 2019 Southeast Asian Games held in the Philippines. She is also a bronze medalist in this event at the 2018 Asian Games held in Jakarta, Indonesia.

== Career ==
She won one of the bronze medals in the women's 52 kg event at the 2018 Asian Games held in Jakarta, Indonesia.

In 2019, she competed in the women's 52 kg event at the World Judo Championships held in Tokyo, Japan. She was eliminated in her second match by Joana Ramos of Portugal. In the same year, she won the gold medal in the women's 52 kg event at the 2019 Southeast Asian Games held in the Philippines.

In 2021, she lost her bronze medal match in her event at the Asian-Pacific Judo Championships held in Bishkek, Kyrgyzstan. A few months later, she represented Thailand at the 2020 Summer Olympics in Tokyo, Japan. She competed in the women's 52 kg event where she was eliminated in her first match by Soumiya Iraoui of Morocco.

== Achievements ==
Year	Tournament	Place	Weight class
2018	Asian Games	3rd	−52 kg
2019	Southeast Asian Games	1st	−52 kg
