= Wang Yan (judoka) =

Chinese judoka (born 1994)

Personal information
- Born: 28 August 1994 (age 31)
- Occupation: Judoka

Sport
- Country: China
- Sport: Judo
- Weight class: +78 kg

Achievements and titles
- World Champ.: R16 (2018)
- Asian Champ.: (silver) (2021)
Medal record
Women's judo
Representing China
Asian Games
Bronze medal – third place	2018 Jakarta	+78 kg
Asian Championships
Silver medal – second place	2021 Bishkek	+78 kg
Bronze medal – third place	2019 Fujairah	+78 kg
IJF Grand Slam
Silver medal – second place	2018 Paris	+78 kg
IJF Grand Prix
Bronze medal – third place	2018 Hohhot	+78 kg
Bronze medal – third place	2019 Budapest	+78 kg

Profile at external databases
- IJF: 9772
- JudoInside.com: 82347
- Updated on 26 November 2022

Wang Yan (born 28 August 1994) is a Chinese judoka.

Wang is the silver medalist of the 2018 Judo Grand Slam Paris in the +78 kg category.
