= Andreea Chițu =

Romanian judoka (born 1988)

Personal information
- Full name: Andreea Ștefania Chițu
- Born: 7 May 1988 (age 38) Bolintin-Vale, Romania
- Occupation: Judoka

Sport
- Country: Romania
- Sport: Judo
- Weight class: ‍–‍52 kg

Achievements and titles
- Olympic Games: 7th (2016)
- World Champ.: (silver) (2014, 2015)
- European Champ.: (gold) (2012, 2015)
Medal record
Women's judo
Representing Romania
World Championships
| Silver medal – second place | 2014 Chelyabinsk | ‍–‍52 kg |
| Silver medal – second place | 2015 Astana | ‍–‍52 kg |
| Bronze medal – third place | 2011 Paris | ‍–‍52 kg |
European Games
| Gold medal – first place | 2015 Baku | ‍–‍52 kg |
European Championships
| Gold medal – first place | 2012 Chelyabinsk | ‍–‍52 kg |
| Silver medal – second place | 2013 Budapest | ‍–‍52 kg |
| Silver medal – second place | 2020 Prague | ‍–‍52 kg |
| Bronze medal – third place | 2014 Montpellier | ‍–‍52 kg |
| Bronze medal – third place | 2016 Kazan | ‍–‍52 kg |
World Masters
| Bronze medal – third place | 2013 Tyumen | ‍–‍52 kg |
IJF Grand Slam
| Silver medal – second place | 2014 Abu Dhabi | ‍–‍52 kg |
| Silver medal – second place | 2015 Baku | ‍–‍52 kg |
| Silver medal – second place | 2016 Paris | ‍–‍52 kg |
| Bronze medal – third place | 2013 Paris | ‍–‍52 kg |
| Bronze medal – third place | 2013 Tokyo | ‍–‍52 kg |
| Bronze medal – third place | 2014 Tyumen | ‍–‍52 kg |
| Bronze medal – third place | 2020 Budapest | ‍–‍52 kg |
IJF Grand Prix
| Gold medal – first place | 2014 Tashkent | ‍–‍52 kg |
| Gold medal – first place | 2014 Jeju | ‍–‍52 kg |
| Gold medal – first place | 2015 Zagreb | ‍–‍52 kg |
| Gold medal – first place | 2015 Jeju | ‍–‍52 kg |
| Gold medal – first place | 2019 Antalya | ‍–‍52 kg |
| Silver medal – second place | 2013 Düsseldorf | ‍–‍52 kg |
| Bronze medal – third place | 2013 Abu Dhabi | ‍–‍52 kg |
| Bronze medal – third place | 2013 Jeju | ‍–‍52 kg |
| Bronze medal – third place | 2014 Samsun | ‍–‍52 kg |
| Bronze medal – third place | 2015 Düsseldorf | ‍–‍52 kg |
| Bronze medal – third place | 2016 Düsseldorf | ‍–‍52 kg |
| Bronze medal – third place | 2019 Tel Aviv | ‍–‍52 kg |
| Bronze medal – third place | 2019 Budapest | ‍–‍52 kg |
European U23 Championships
| Gold medal – first place | 2010 Sarajevo | ‍–‍57 kg |
| Silver medal – second place | 2008 Zagreb | ‍–‍57 kg |
| Silver medal – second place | 2009 Antalya | ‍–‍57 kg |
European Junior Championships
| Bronze medal – third place | 2006 Tallinn | ‍–‍52 kg |
European Cadet Championships
| Bronze medal – third place | 2004 Rotterdam | ‍–‍52 kg |

Profile at external databases
- IJF: 2045
- JudoInside.com: 33403
- Updated on 21 May 2023

Andreea Ștefania Chițu (born 7 May 1988) is a Romanian judoka who competes in the women's ‍–‍52 kg category. At the 2012 Summer Olympics, she was defeated in the second round by Ilse Heylen, having beaten Soraya Haddad in the first round. At the 2016 Summer Olympics, she beat Laura Gómez in her first match, before losing to Odette Giuffrida in the quarter-finals. Because Giuffrida reached the final, Chițu entered the repechage. She was eliminated in the repechage by Érika Miranda.
