= Hela Ayari =

Tunisian judoka (born 1994)

Personal information
- Born: 26 August 1994 (age 31)
- Occupation: Judoka

Sport
- Country: Tunisia
- Sport: Judo
- Weight class: ‍–‍48 kg, ‍–‍52 kg

Achievements and titles
- Olympic Games: R16 (2016)
- World Champ.: R32 (2014, 2015)
- African Champ.: (gold) (2012, 2014, 2015, 2016)
Medal record
Women's judo
Representing Tunisia
African Games
Silver medal – second place	2015 Brazzaville	‍–‍52 kg
African Championships
Gold medal – first place	2012 Agadir	‍–‍48 kg
Gold medal – first place	2014 Port Louis	‍–‍52 kg
Gold medal – first place	2015 Libreville	‍–‍52 kg
Gold medal – first place	2016 Tunis	‍–‍52 kg
Silver medal – second place	2018 Tunis	‍–‍52 kg
Bronze medal – third place	2013 Maputo	‍–‍48 kg
IJF Grand Prix
Bronze medal – third place	2013 Düsseldorf	‍–‍48 kg
African Junior Championships
Gold medal – first place	2012 Gaborone	‍–‍48 kg
Gold medal – first place	2013 Algiers	‍–‍52 kg
Gold medal – first place	2014 Tunis	‍–‍52 kg

Profile at external databases
- IJF: 10374
- JudoInside.com: 81192
- Updated on 28 December 2022

Hela Ayari (born 26 August 1994) is a Tunisian judoka. She won her class in the African Judo Championships in 2012, 2014, 2015 and 2016.

Ayari competed at the 2016 Summer Olympics in Rio de Janeiro, in the women's 52 kg, where she placed ninth.
