= Anamari Velenšek =

Slovenian judoka (born 1991)

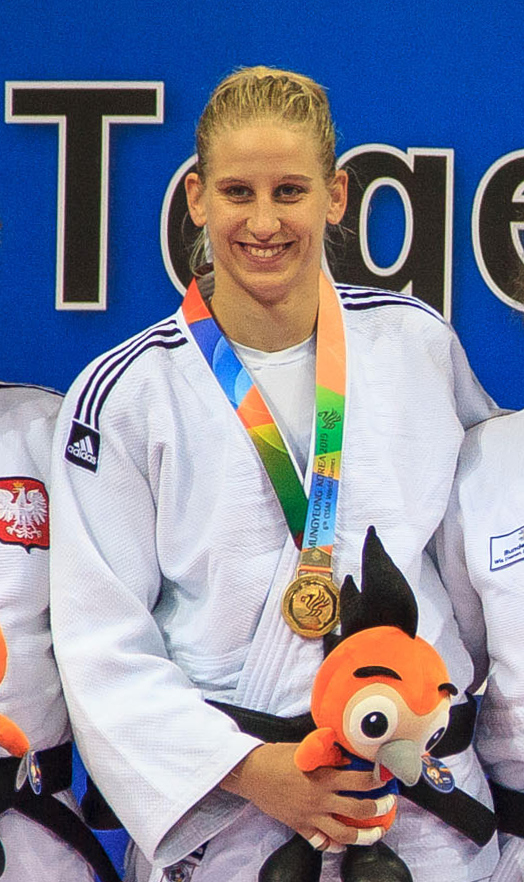
- Velenšek at the 2015 Military World Games

Personal information
- Born: 15 May 1991 (age 35) Celje, Slovenia
- Occupation: Judoka
- Height: 175 cm (5 ft 9 in)

Sport
- Country: Slovenia
- Sport: Judo
- Weight class: –78 kg, +78 kg
- Club: JK Sankaku
- Coached by: Marjan Fabjan

Achievements and titles
- Olympic Games: (bronze) (2016)
- World Champ.: (silver) (2015)
- European Champ.: (silver) (2013)
Medal record
Women's judo
Representing Slovenia
Olympic Games
Bronze medal – third place	2016 Rio de Janeiro	‍–‍78 kg
World Championships
Silver medal – second place	2015 Astana	‍–‍78 kg
Bronze medal – third place	2014 Chelyabinsk	‍–‍78 kg
European Games
Bronze medal – third place	2015 Baku	‍–‍78 kg
European Championships
Silver medal – second place	2013 Budapest	‍–‍78 kg
Bronze medal – third place	2011 Istanbul	‍–‍78 kg
Bronze medal – third place	2012 Chelyabinsk	‍–‍78 kg
World Masters
Bronze medal – third place	2012 Almaty	‍–‍78 kg
IJF Grand Slam
Gold medal – first place	2014 Paris	‍–‍78 kg
Bronze medal – third place	2014 Tokyo	‍–‍78 kg
Bronze medal – third place	2015 Tokyo	‍–‍78 kg
Bronze medal – third place	2019 Baku	+78 kg
IJF Grand Prix
Gold medal – first place	2012 Qingdao	‍–‍78 kg
Gold medal – first place	2013 Rijeka	‍–‍78 kg
Gold medal – first place	2014 Zagreb	‍–‍78 kg
Gold medal – first place	2015 Zagreb	‍–‍78 kg
Gold medal – first place	2017 Tashkent	+78 kg
Gold medal – first place	2018 Zagreb	+78 kg
Silver medal – second place	2014 Düsseldorf	‍–‍78 kg
Silver medal – second place	2014 Budapest	‍–‍78 kg
Silver medal – second place	2015 Düsseldorf	‍–‍78 kg
Silver medal – second place	2015 Budapest	‍–‍78 kg
Silver medal – second place	2016 Budapest	‍–‍78 kg
Silver medal – second place	2018 Agadir	+78 kg
Bronze medal – third place	2016 Düsseldorf	‍–‍78 kg
Bronze medal – third place	2017 Cancún	+78 kg
Bronze medal – third place	2019 Tel Aviv	+78 kg
Bronze medal – third place	2019 Zagreb	+78 kg
European U23 Championships
Bronze medal – third place	2012 Prague	‍–‍78 kg
World Juniors Championships
Silver medal – second place	2010 Agadir	‍–‍78 kg
Military World Games
Gold medal – first place	2015 Mungyeong	‍–‍78 kg

Profile at external databases
- IJF: 1335
- JudoInside.com: 50727
- Updated on 21 May 2023

Anamari "Ana" Velenšek (born 15 May 1991) is a Slovenian judoka. She won several medals at the world and European championships in 2011–15 and competed at the 2012 and 2016 Olympics, winning a bronze medal in 2016. In 2015, she won silver at the World Championships. That year, she also won gold in the Military World Games and bronze at the European Games. She also competed in the women's +78 kg event at the 2020 Summer Olympics in Tokyo, Japan.

She trains at the Sankaku club, in her home town of Celje. Since 2011, she is part of the Slovenian Armed Forces Athletes Unit. She is studying for a degree in social care. Her sister, Klara Apotekar, is also an international judoka.
