= Ruika Sato =

Japanese judoka (born 1992)

Personal information
- Born: 27 March 1992 (age 34)
- Occupation: Judoka

Sport
- Country: Japan
- Sport: Judo
- Weight class: ‍–‍78 kg

Achievements and titles
- World Champ.: 5th (2017)
- Asian Champ.: (gold) (2018)
Medal record
Women's judo
Representing Japan
Asian Games
| Gold medal – first place | 2018 Jakarta | ‍–‍78 kg |
World Masters
| Silver medal – second place | 2018 Guangzhou | ‍–‍78 kg |
IJF Grand Slam
| Gold medal – first place | 2010 Rio de Janeiro | ‍–‍78 kg |
| Gold medal – first place | 2012 Tokyo | ‍–‍78 kg |
| Gold medal – first place | 2016 Tokyo | ‍–‍78 kg |
| Gold medal – first place | 2018 Düsseldorf | ‍–‍78 kg |
| Gold medal – first place | 2018 Osaka | ‍–‍78 kg |
| Silver medal – second place | 2014 Tokyo | ‍–‍78 kg |
| Silver medal – second place | 2015 Tyumen | ‍–‍78 kg |
| Silver medal – second place | 2015 Paris | ‍–‍78 kg |
| Silver medal – second place | 2017 Paris | ‍–‍78 kg |
| Bronze medal – third place | 2009 Tokyo | ‍–‍78 kg |
| Bronze medal – third place | 2013 Paris | ‍–‍78 kg |
| Bronze medal – third place | 2013 Tokyo | ‍–‍78 kg |
| Bronze medal – third place | 2017 Tokyo | ‍–‍78 kg |
IJF Grand Prix
| Gold medal – first place | 2018 Hohhot | ‍–‍78 kg |
| Silver medal – second place | 2010 Düsseldorf | ‍–‍78 kg |
| Silver medal – second place | 2013 Düsseldorf | ‍–‍78 kg |
| Silver medal – second place | 2019 Budapest | ‍–‍78 kg |
| Bronze medal – third place | 2011 Abu Dhabi | ‍–‍78 kg |
| Bronze medal – third place | 2015 Düsseldorf | ‍–‍78 kg |
| Bronze medal – third place | 2017 Hohhot | ‍–‍78 kg |
World Juniors Championships
| Bronze medal – third place | 2008 Bangkok | ‍–‍78 kg |
Asian Junior Championships
| Gold medal – first place | 2008 Sana'a | ‍–‍78 kg |
| Silver medal – second place | 2007 Hyderabad | ‍–‍78 kg |

Profile at external databases
- IJF: 2015
- JudoInside.com: 45842
- Updated on 20 November 2022

Ruika Sato (born 27 March 1992) is a Japanese judoka. She competed in the women's 78 kg event at the World Judo Championships in 2013, 2014 and 2017.

In 2018, Sato won the gold medal in the women's 78 kg event at the Asian Games held in Jakarta, Indonesia.
