= Annabelle Euranie =

French judoka (born 1982)

Personal information
- Born: 4 September 1982 (age 43)
- Occupation: Judoka

Sport
- Country: France
- Sport: Judo
- Weight class: –52 kg

Achievements and titles
- Olympic Games: 5th (2004)
- World Champ.: (silver) (2003)
- European Champ.: (gold) (2003)
Medal record
Women's judo
Representing France
World Championships
Gold medal – first place	2014 Chelyabinsk	Women's team
Silver medal – second place	2003 Osaka	–52 kg
European Championships
Gold medal – first place	2003 Düsseldorf	–52 kg
European Games
Silver medal – second place	2015 Baku	–52 kg
World Masters
Bronze medal – third place	2015 Rabat	–52 kg
Bronze medal – third place	2016 Guadalajara	–52 kg
IJF Grand Slam
Gold medal – first place	2014 Baku	–52 kg
Gold medal – first place	2015 Abu Dhabi	–52 kg
Bronze medal – third place	2014 Abu Dhabi	–52 kg
Bronze medal – third place	2015 Tokyo	–52 kg
Bronze medal – third place	2016 Paris	–52 kg
IJF Grand Prix
Gold medal – first place	2014 Zagreb	–52 kg
European Junior Championships
Gold medal – first place	2001 Budapest	–52 kg

Profile at external databases
- IJF: 15240
- JudoInside.com: 14759
- Updated on 17 February 2022

Annabelle Euranie (born 4 September 1982 in Gonesse, France) is a French judoka who competed at the 2004 Summer Olympics in the women's half-lightweight division.
