= Yuki Hashimoto (judoka) =

Japanese judoka (born 1989)

Personal information
- Born: 9 May 1989 (age 37)
- Occupation: Judoka

Sport
- Country: Japan
- Sport: Judo
- Weight class: ‍–‍52 kg

Achievements and titles
- World Champ.: (bronze) (2013)
Medal record
Women's judo
Representing Japan
World Championships
| Bronze medal – third place | 2013 Rio de Janeiro | ‍–‍52 kg |
| Bronze medal – third place | 2014 Chelyabinsk | Women's team |
World Masters
| Silver medal – second place | 2015 Rabat | ‍–‍52 kg |
IJF Grand Slam
| Gold medal – first place | 2012 Tokyo | ‍–‍52 kg |
| Gold medal – first place | 2013 Paris | ‍–‍52 kg |
| Gold medal – first place | 2013 Tokyo | ‍–‍52 kg |
| Gold medal – first place | 2014 Tokyo | ‍–‍52 kg |
| Bronze medal – third place | 2011 Tokyo | ‍–‍52 kg |
| Bronze medal – third place | 2015 Tokyo | ‍–‍52 kg |
IJF Grand Prix
| Gold medal – first place | 2012 Düsseldorf | ‍–‍52 kg |
| Silver medal – second place | 2011 Amsterdam | ‍–‍52 kg |
| Silver medal – second place | 2014 Düsseldorf | ‍–‍52 kg |
| Bronze medal – third place | 2011 Qingdao | ‍–‍52 kg |
Summer Universiade
| Gold medal – first place | 2011 Shenzhen | Women's team |
| Bronze medal – third place | 2011 Shenzhen | ‍–‍52 kg |

Profile at external databases
- IJF: 2023
- JudoInside.com: 63309
- Updated on 10 July 2023

Yuki Hashimoto (橋本 優貴, Hashimoto Yuki; born 9 May 1989) is a Japanese judoka.

She started judo at the age of 6.

Her favorite techniques are Ōuchi gari and Newaza.

She won the bronze medal in the half-lightweight division (‍–‍52 kg) at the World Judo Championships in 2013.
