= Antoinette Gasongo =

Burundian judoka

Personal information
- Nationality: Burundian

Sport
- Sport: Judo

Antoinette Gasongo (born 1994 or 1996) is a Burundian judoka.

She competed at the 2016 Summer Olympics in Rio de Janeiro, in the women's 52 kg but lost to Joana Ramos in the first round.
