= Ikumi Oeda =

Thai judoka (born 1993)

Personal information
- Born: 1 June 1993 (age 33) Thailand
- Occupation: Judoka

Sport
- Country: Thailand
- Sport: Judo
- Weight class: ‍–‍78 kg

Achievements and titles
- World Champ.: R32 (2019, 2021, 2024)
- Asian Champ.: (bronze) (2018)
Medal record
Women's judo
Representing Thailand
Asian Games
Bronze medal – third place	2018 Jakarta	‍–‍78 kg
Southeast Asian Games
Gold medal – first place	2019 Philippines	‍–‍78 kg
Bronze medal – third place	2019 Philippines	Women's team

Profile at external databases
- IJF: 42219
- JudoInside.com: 117833
- Updated on 22 May 2024

Ikumi Oeda (born 1 June 1993) is a Thai judoka. She won the gold medal in the women's 78 kg event at the 2019 Southeast Asian Games held in the Philippines.

Oeda won one of the bronze medals in the women's 78 kg event at the 2018 Asian Games held in Jakarta, Indonesia. She also competed in the women's 78 kg event at the 2019 World Judo Championships and the same event at the 2021 World Judo Championships. She was eliminated in her first match in both events. She was also eliminated in her first match in the women's 78 kg at the 2024 World Judo Championships.
