= Érika Miranda =

Brazilian judoka (born 1987)

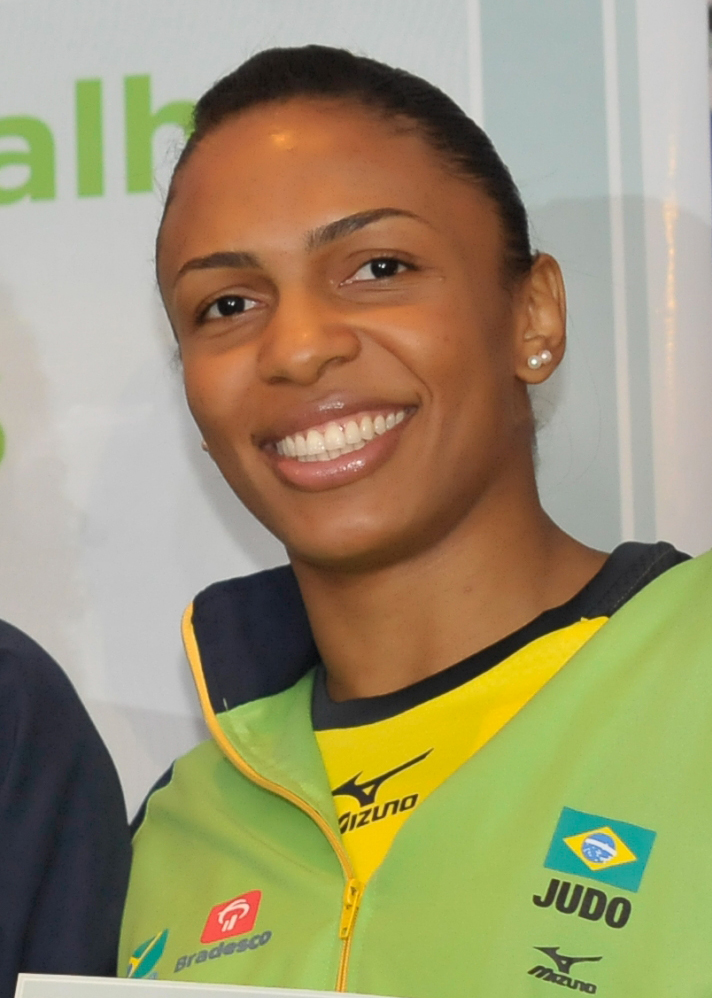

Personal information
- Born: 4 June 1987 (age 39) Brasília, DF, Brazil
- Occupation: Judoka

Sport
- Country: Brazil
- Sport: Judo
- Weight class: –52 kg

Achievements and titles
- World Champ.: (silver) (2013)
- Pan American Champ.: (2012, 2014, 2015, 2016)
Medal record
Women's judo
Representing Brazil
World Championships
Silver medal – second place	2013 Rio de Janeiro	‍–‍52 kg
Silver medal – second place	2017 Budapest	Mixed team
Bronze medal – third place	2014 Chelyabinsk	‍–‍52 kg
Bronze medal – third place	2015 Astana	‍–‍52 kg
Bronze medal – third place	2017 Budapest	‍–‍52 kg
Bronze medal – third place	2018 Baku	‍–‍52 kg
Pan American Games
Gold medal – first place	2015 Toronto	‍–‍52 kg
Silver medal – second place	2007 Rio de Janeiro	‍–‍52 kg
Silver medal – second place	2011 Guadalajara	‍–‍52 kg
Pan American Championships
Gold medal – first place	2012 Montreal	‍–‍52 kg
Gold medal – first place	2014 Guayaquil	‍–‍52 kg
Gold medal – first place	2015 Edmonton	‍–‍52 kg
Gold medal – first place	2016 Havana	‍–‍52 kg
Silver medal – second place	2008 Miami	‍–‍52 kg
Bronze medal – third place	2006 Buenos Aires	‍–‍52 kg
Bronze medal – third place	2007 Montreal	‍–‍52 kg
Bronze medal – third place	2011 Guadalajara	‍–‍52 kg
Bronze medal – third place	2013 San José	‍–‍52 kg
World Masters
Bronze medal – third place	2017 Saint Petersburg	‍–‍52 kg
IJF Grand Slam
Gold medal – first place	2011 Rio de Janeiro	‍–‍52 kg
Gold medal – first place	2012 Moscow	‍–‍52 kg
Gold medal – first place	2015 Baku	‍–‍52 kg
Gold medal – first place	2017 Ekaterinburg	‍–‍52 kg
Silver medal – second place	2013 Moscow	‍–‍52 kg
Silver medal – second place	2013 Tokyo	‍–‍52 kg
Silver medal – second place	2015 Abu Dhabi	‍–‍52 kg
Silver medal – second place	2017 Abu Dhabi	‍–‍52 kg
Silver medal – second place	2018 Ekaterinburg	‍–‍52 kg
Bronze medal – third place	2009 Rio de Janeiro	‍–‍52 kg
Bronze medal – third place	2009 Tokyo	‍–‍52 kg
Bronze medal – third place	2014 Tyumen	‍–‍52 kg
IJF Grand Prix
Silver medal – second place	2010 Abu Dhabi	‍–‍52 kg
Silver medal – second place	2012 Abu Dhabi	‍–‍52 kg
Silver medal – second place	2012 Qingdao	‍–‍52 kg
Silver medal – second place	2014 Havana	‍–‍52 kg
Silver medal – second place	2017 Tbilisi	‍–‍52 kg
Bronze medal – third place	2011 Qingdao	‍–‍52 kg
Bronze medal – third place	2014 Düsseldorf	‍–‍52 kg
Bronze medal – third place	2016 Tbilisi	‍–‍52 kg
Military World Games
Gold medal – first place	2015 Mungyeong	Team

Profile at external databases
- IJF: 437
- JudoInside.com: 42664
- Updated on 23 May 2023

Érika de Souza Miranda (born 4 June 1987) is a Brazilian judoka.

She won the silver medal in the Half-lightweight −52 kg division at the 2011 Pan American Games in Guadalajara, Mexico. She competed at the 2016 Summer Olympics in the women's 52 kg event, in which she lost the bronze medal match to Misato Nakamura. She also competed in that division at the 2012 Summer Olympics but was knocked out in the second round.
