= Adiyaasambuugiin Tsolmon =

Mongolian judoka (born 1992)

Personal information
- Nationality: Mongolian
- Born: 7 November 1992 (age 33)
- Occupation: Judoka

Sport
- Country: Mongolia
- Sport: Judo
- Weight class: –52 kg

Achievements and titles
- Olympic Games: R16 (2016)
- World Champ.: 7th (2015)
- Asian Champ.: 5th (2016)
Medal record
Women's judo
Representing Mongolia
World Masters
Silver medal – second place	2013 Tyumen	–52 kg
IJF Grand Slam
Silver medal – second place	2013 Baku	–52 kg
IJF Grand Prix
Silver medal – second place	2013 Ulaanbaatar	–52 kg
Silver medal – second place	2014 Tashkent	–52 kg
Silver medal – second place	2015 Ulaanbaatar	–52 kg
Bronze medal – third place	2013 Samsun	–52 kg
Bronze medal – third place	2013 Miami	–52 kg
Bronze medal – third place	2014 Ulaanbaatar	–52 kg
Bronze medal – third place	2015 Qingdao	–52 kg
Bronze medal – third place	2016 Havana	–52 kg

Profile at external databases
- IJF: 9187
- JudoInside.com: 72127
- Updated on 23 October 2022

Adiyaasambuugiin Tsolmon (born 7 November 1992) is a Mongolian judoka.

She competed at the 2016 Summer Olympics in Rio de Janeiro, in the women's 52 kg.
