= Judo at the 2018 Asian Games – Women's 78 kg =

Judo competition

Women's 78 kg at the 2018 Asian Games
- Venue: Jakarta Convention Center
- Date: 31 August 2018
- Competitors: 9 from 9 nations

Medalists
| gold medal | Ruika Sato | Japan |
| silver medal | Park Yu-jin | South Korea |
| bronze medal | Ikumi Oeda | Thailand |
| bronze medal | Ma Zhenzhao | China |

The women's 78 kilograms (Half heavyweight) competition at the 2018 Asian Games in Jakarta was held on 31 August at the Jakarta Convention Center Assembly Hall.

Ruika Sato of Japan won the gold medal.

== Schedule ==
All times are Western Indonesia Time (UTC+07:00)

| Date | Time | Event |
|---|---|---|
| Friday, 31 August 2018 | 09:00 | Elimination round of 16 |
| Friday, 31 August 2018 | 09:00 | Quarterfinals |
| Friday, 31 August 2018 | 09:00 | Repechage |
| Friday, 31 August 2018 | 09:00 | Semifinals |
| Friday, 31 August 2018 | 16:00 | Finals |

== Results ==
=== Main bracket ===
Elimination round of 16
Khonema Chanthakoummane (LAO) | 10
Vika Irma Safitri (INA) | 00

Quarterfinals
Ruika Sato (JPN) | 10
Khonema Chanthakoummane (LAO) | 00
Ma Zhenzhao (CHN) | 10
Ikumi Oeda (THA) | 00
Park Yu-jin (KOR) | 10
Punam Shrestha (NEP) | 00
Zarina Raifova (KAZ) | 00
Nodira Yuldasheva (UZB) | 01

Semifinals
Ruika Sato (JPN) | 10
Ma Zhenzhao (CHN) | 00
Park Yu-jin (KOR) | 10
Nodira Yuldasheva (UZB) | 00

Gold medal contest
Ruika Sato (JPN) | 10
Park Yu-jin (KOR) | 00

=== Repechage ===
Repechage
Khonema Chanthakoummane (LAO) | 00
Ikumi Oeda (THA) | 10
Punam Shrestha (NEP) | 00
Zarina Raifova (KAZ) | 10

Bronze medal contests
Ikumi Oeda (THA) | 01
Nodira Yuldasheva (UZB) | 00
Zarina Raifova (KAZ) | 00
Ma Zhenzhao (CHN) | 10
