= Judo at the 2018 Asian Games – Women's +78 kg =

Judo competition

Women's +78 kg at the 2018 Asian Games
- Venue: Jakarta Convention Center
- Date: 31 August 2018
- Competitors: 9 from 9 nations

Medalists
| gold medal | Akira Sone | Japan |
| silver medal | Kim Min-jeong | South Korea |
| bronze medal | Gulzhan Issanova | Kazakhstan |
| bronze medal | Wang Yan | China |

The women's +78 kilograms (Heavyweight) competition at the 2018 Asian Games in Jakarta was held on 31 August at the Jakarta Convention Center Assembly Hall.

Akira Sone of Japan won the gold medal.

== Schedule ==
All times are Western Indonesia Time (UTC+07:00)

| Date | Time | Event |
|---|---|---|
| Friday, 31 August 2018 | 09:00 | Elimination round of 16 |
| Friday, 31 August 2018 | 09:00 | Quarterfinals |
| Friday, 31 August 2018 | 09:00 | Repechage |
| Friday, 31 August 2018 | 09:00 | Semifinals |
| Friday, 31 August 2018 | 16:00 | Finals |

== Results ==
=== Main bracket ===
Elimination round of 16
Rinata Ilmatova (UZB) | 10
Dewa Ayu Mira Widari (INA) | 00

Quarterfinals
Kim Min-jeong (KOR) | 10
Rinata Ilmatova (UZB) | 00
Wang Yan (CHN) | 01
Battulgyn Mönkhtuyaa (MGL) | 00
Akira Sone (JPN) | 10
Rajwinder Kaur (IND) | 00
Gulzhan Issanova (KAZ) | 10
Tsai Jia-wen (TPE) | 00

Semifinals
Kim Min-jeong (KOR) | 10
Wang Yan (CHN) | 00
Akira Sone (JPN) | 10
Gulzhan Issanova (KAZ) | 00

Gold medal contest
Kim Min-jeong (KOR) | 00
Akira Sone (JPN) | 01

=== Repechage ===
Repechage
Rinata Ilmatova (UZB) | 00
Battulgyn Mönkhtuyaa (MGL) | 10
Rajwinder Kaur (IND) | 00
Tsai Jia-wen (TPE) | 10

Bronze medal contests
Battulgyn Mönkhtuyaa (MGL) | 00
Gulzhan Issanova (KAZ) | 10
Tsai Jia-wen (TPE) | 00
Wang Yan (CHN) | 10
