= Gülbadam Babamuratowa =

Turkmen judoka (born 1991)

Gulbadam Babamuratova
Personal information
- Nationality: Turkmenistan
- Born: 24 August 1991 (age 34) Turkmenabat, Turkmenistan
- Home town: Ashgabat, Turkmenistan
- Occupation: Judoka
- Height: 1.56 m (5 ft 1 in)

Sport
- Country: Turkmenistan
- Sport: Judo, Sambo, Belt wrestling
- Weight class: –52 kg
- Coached by: Chemengul Geldybayeva

Achievements and titles
- Olympic Games: R32 (2016, 2020)
- World Champ.: 5th (2015)
- Asian Champ.: (silver) (2014)
Medal record
Representing Turkmenistan
Women's judo
Asian Games
Silver medal – second place	2014 Incheon	–52 kg
Asian Championships
Bronze medal – third place	2016 Tashkent	–52 kg
IJF Grand Prix
Gold medal – first place	2015 Tashkent	–52 kg
Gold medal – first place	2016 Samsun	–52 kg
Silver medal – second place	2015 Qingdao	–52 kg
Bronze medal – third place	2016 Düsseldorf	–52 kg
Bronze medal – third place	2018 Agadir	–52 kg
Bronze medal – third place	2018 Tbilisi	–52 kg
Women's belt wrestling
Summer Universiade
Gold medal – first place	2013 Kazan	52 kg
Women's sambo
Summer Universiade
Bronze medal – third place	2013 Kazan	52 kg
Women's beach sambo
Asian Beach Games
Gold medal – first place	2014 Phuket	52 kg
Silver medal – second place	2014 Phuket	Mixed team

Profile at external databases
- IJF: 6692
- JudoInside.com: 74094
- Updated on 1 December 2022

Gulbadam Babamuratova (Turkmen Cyrillic: Гулбадам Бабамуратова; born 24 August 1991) is a Turkmenistan judoka, sambo and belt wrestling practitioner in the category up to 52 kg. International Master of Sports.

== Biography ==
Gulbadam Babamuratova attended the National Institute of Sports and Tourism. Coaches - Çemengül Geldybaýewa and Dörtguly Tejenow.

In 2012, at the 36th World Sambo Championship in Minsk, she became the world champion in the up to 52 kg weight category. In December 2012, she won the gold medal of the World Cup in Sambo.

In 2013, she won a gold medal in wrestling on belts and bronze in sambo (52 kg) at the Universiade in Kazan.

In June 2014, she won a gold medal at the Asian Championship in sport and combat sambo in Tashkent. In Judo at the 2014 Asian Games in Incheon, she won the a silver medal in the women's 52 kg. At the 2014 Asian Beach Games, she won gold and silver medals.

At October 2015 Babamuratova win first ever judo grand prix gold medal for Turkmenistan at 3rd Judo grand prix in Tashkent, she beat at 52 kilo crown finalist Maria Ertl from Germany.

She was selected to compete at the 2020 Olympic Games and drawn against Gili Cohen in the first round.

== Recognition ==
- Order for Great Love for Independent Turkmenistan (2017)

Olympic Games
Preceded by Merdan Ataýew	Flagbearer for Turkmenistan; Tokyo 2020 (shared with Merdan Ataýew)	Succeeded by
