= Darya Skrypnik =

Belarusian judoka (born 1987)

Personal information
- Nationality: Belarusian
- Born: 12 December 1987 (age 38)
- Occupation: Judoka

Sport
- Country: Belarus
- Sport: Judo
- Weight class: –52 kg

Achievements and titles
- Olympic Games: R32 (2016)
- World Champ.: (bronze) (2015)
- European Champ.: R16 (2013, 2014, 2016, 2017)
Medal record
Women's judo
Representing Belarus
World Championships
Bronze medal – third place	2015 Astana	‍–‍52 kg
IJF Grand Prix
Bronze medal – third place	2017 Tbilisi	‍–‍52 kg
European U23 Championships
Bronze medal – third place	2008 Zagreb	‍–‍52 kg
European Junior Championships
Bronze medal – third place	2006 Tallinn	‍–‍52 kg

Profile at external databases
- IJF: 14013
- JudoInside.com: 38148
- Updated on 3 July 2023

Darya Skrypnik (Belarusian: Дар'я Скрыпнік; born 12 December 1987) is a Belarusian judoka. She competed at the 2016 Summer Olympics in the women's 52 kg event, in which she was eliminated in the first round by Mareen Kräh.

In 2017, she competed in the women's 52 kg event at the 2017 European Judo Championships held in Warsaw, Poland.
