= Zarina Raifova =

Kazakhztani judoka (born 1991)

Personal information
- Nationality: Kazakhstani
- Born: 20 May 1991 (age 35)
- Occupation: Judoka

Sport
- Country: Kazakhstan
- Sport: Judo
- Disability class: J2
- Weight class: ‍–‍78 kg

Achievements and titles
- World Champ.: R16 (2017, 2018)
- Asian Champ.: 5th (2018, 2019)
Medal record
Representing Kazakhstan
Women's para judo
Asian Para Games
Silver medal – second place	2022 Hangzhou	+70 kg
Women's judo
IJF Grand Prix
Bronze medal – third place	2016 Tashkent	‍–‍78 kg
Bronze medal – third place	2017 Antalya	‍–‍78 kg

Profile at external databases
- IJF: 14696
- JudoInside.com: 79897
- Updated on 7 December 2022

Zarina Raifova (born 20 May 1991) is a Kazakhstani judoka.

== Career ==
Raifova won a bronze medal at the 2017 Judo Grand Prix Antalya in the ‍–‍78 kg category.
