= Assunta Galeone =

Italian judoka (born 1998)

Personal information
- Born: 24 February 1986 (age 40)
- Occupation: Judoka

Sport
- Country: Italy
- Sport: Judo
- Weight class: ‍–‍78 kg

Achievements and titles
- World Champ.: 7th (2017)
- European Champ.: 5th (2010)
Medal record
Women's judo
Representing Italy
IJF Grand Slam
| Silver medal – second place | 2014 Baku | ‍–‍78 kg |
IJF Grand Prix
| Gold medal – first place | 2014 Tbilisi | ‍–‍78 kg |
| Bronze medal – third place | 2014 Astana | ‍–‍78 kg |
| Bronze medal – third place | 2016 Havana | ‍–‍78 kg |
| Bronze medal – third place | 2017 Tbilisi | ‍–‍78 kg |
European U23 Championships
| Silver medal – second place | 2008 Zagreb | ‍–‍78 kg |

Profile at external databases
- IJF: 696
- JudoInside.com: 28637
- Updated on 27 November 2022

Assunta Galeone (born 24 February 1998) is an Italian judoka.

Galeone is a bronze medalist from the 2017 Judo Grand Prix Tbilisi in the ‍–‍78 kg category.
