= Ma Yingnan =

Chinese judoka (born 1984)

Personal information
- Born: 3 March 1984 (age 42) Shenyang, Liaoning, China
- Occupation: Judoka

Sport
- Country: China
- Sport: Judo
- Weight class: ‍–‍52 kg

Achievements and titles
- Olympic Games: 5th (2016)
- World Champ.: 5th (2014)
- Asian Champ.: (gold) (2015)
Medal record
Women's judo
Representing China
Asian Games
Bronze medal – third place	2014 Incheon	Women's team
Asian Championships
Gold medal – first place	2015 Kuwait	‍–‍52 kg
Silver medal – second place	2016 Tashkent	‍–‍52 kg
IJF Grand Slam
Silver medal – second place	2015 Tyumen	‍–‍52 kg
Bronze medal – third place	2016 Baku	‍–‍52 kg
IJF Grand Prix
Gold medal – first place	2012 Qingdao	‍–‍52 kg
Gold medal – first place	2014 Ulaanbaatar	‍–‍52 kg
Gold medal – first place	2015 Düsseldorf	‍–‍52 kg
Bronze medal – third place	2015 Qingdao	‍–‍52 kg

Profile at external databases
- IJF: 32
- JudoInside.com: 58954
- Updated on 24 November 2022

Ma Yingnan (born 3 March 1984) is a Chinese judoka.

Ma competed at the 2016 Summer Olympics in Rio de Janeiro, in the women's 52 kg.
