= Mareen Kräh =

German judoka (born 1984)

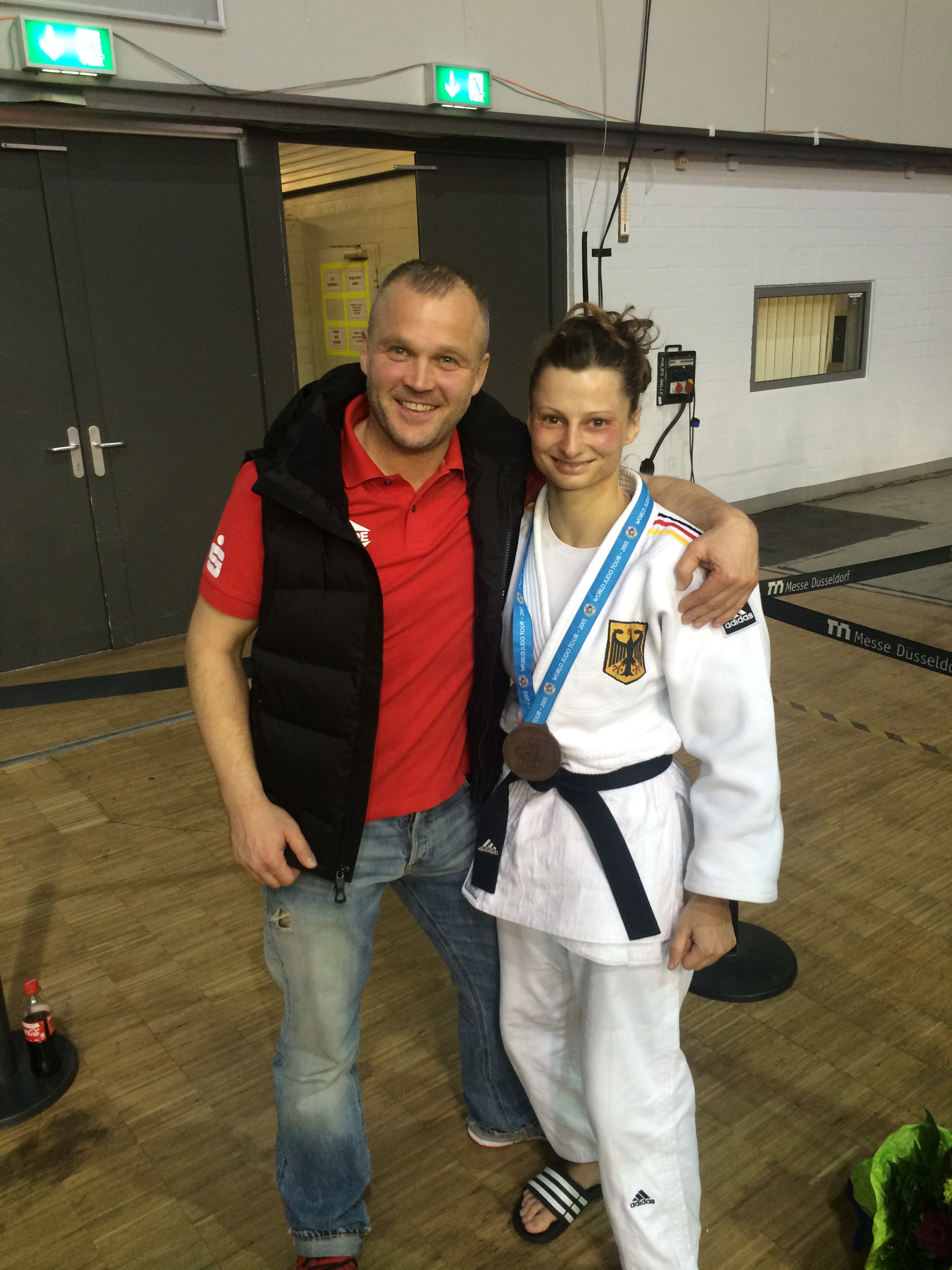
- Kräh (right) in 2015

Personal information
- Born: 28 January 1984 (age 42)
- Occupation: Judoka

Sport
- Country: Germany
- Sport: Judo
- Weight class: ‍–‍52 kg

Achievements and titles
- Olympic Games: R16 (2016)
- World Champ.: (bronze) (2013)
- European Champ.: (bronze) (2006, 2012, 2015)
Medal record
Women's judo
Representing Germany
World Championships
Bronze medal – third place	2013 Rio de Janeiro	‍–‍52 kg
Bronze medal – third place	2014 Chelyabinsk	Women's team
European Games
Silver medal – second place	2015 Baku	Women's team
Bronze medal – third place	2015 Baku	‍–‍52 kg
European Championships
Bronze medal – third place	2006 Tampere	‍–‍52 kg
Bronze medal – third place	2012 Chelyabinsk	‍–‍52 kg
IJF Grand Slam
Bronze medal – third place	2013 Baku	‍–‍52 kg
Bronze medal – third place	2014 Paris	‍–‍52 kg
Bronze medal – third place	2015 Tyumen	‍–‍52 kg
IJF Grand Prix
Gold medal – first place	2013 Rijeka	‍–‍52 kg
Gold medal – first place	2015 Budapest	‍–‍52 kg
Gold medal – first place	2016 Havana	‍–‍52 kg
Silver medal – second place	2013 Samsun	‍–‍52 kg
Silver medal – second place	2014 Ulaanbaatar	‍–‍52 kg
Bronze medal – third place	2010 Düsseldorf	‍–‍52 kg
Bronze medal – third place	2013 Düsseldorf	‍–‍52 kg
Bronze medal – third place	2014 Düsseldorf	‍–‍52 kg
Bronze medal – third place	2014 Havana	‍–‍52 kg
Bronze medal – third place	2014 Qingdao	‍–‍52 kg
Bronze medal – third place	2015 Düsseldorf	‍–‍52 kg
European Junior Championships
Silver medal – second place	2003 Sarajevo	‍–‍52 kg

Profile at external databases
- IJF: 1935
- JudoInside.com: 13141
- Updated on 10 July 2023

Mareen Kräh (born 28 January 1984 in Spremberg, East Germany) is a German judoka. She competed at the 2016 Summer Olympics in the women's 52 kg event, in which she was eliminated in the second round by Odette Giuffrida.
