= Laura Gómez (judoka) =

Spanish judoka (born 1984)

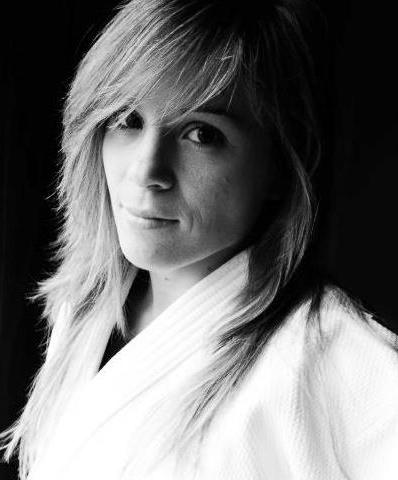
- Gómez in 2012

Personal information
- Full name: Laura Gómez Ropiñon
- Born: 19 April 1984 (age 42) Valencia, Spain
- Occupation: Judoka
- Height: 160 cm (5 ft 3 in)

Sport
- Country: Spain
- Sport: Judo
- Weight class: –52 kg

Achievements and titles
- Olympic Games: R16 (2016)
- World Champ.: 7th (2011)
- European Champ.: (bronze) (2013)
Medal record
Women's judo
Representing Spain
European Championships
Bronze medal – third place	2013 Budapest	–52 kg
World Masters
Silver medal – second place	2010 Suwon	–52 kg
Bronze medal – third place	2011 Baku	–52 kg
IJF Grand Slam
Bronze medal – third place	2010 Moscow	–52 kg
Bronze medal – third place	2010 Tokyo	–52 kg
Bronze medal – third place	2011 Rio de Janeiro	–52 kg
IJF Grand Prix
Gold medal – first place	2009 Abu Dhabi	–52 kg
Silver medal – second place	2010 Rotterdam	–52 kg
Silver medal – second place	2013 Abu Dhabi	–52 kg
Silver medal – second place	2016 Samsun	–52 kg
Bronze medal – third place	2010 Tunis	–52 kg
Bronze medal – third place	2010 Qingdao	–52 kg
Bronze medal – third place	2011 Baku	–52 kg
Bronze medal – third place	2014 Jeju	–52 kg
Bronze medal – third place	2015 Tbilisi	–52 kg
Bronze medal – third place	2015 Budapest	–52 kg
European Junior Championships
Bronze medal – third place	2002 Rotterdam	–57 kg
Summer Universiade
Gold medal – first place	2009 Belgrade	–52 kg

Profile at external databases
- IJF: 1745
- JudoInside.com: 19517
- Updated on 14 November 2022

Laura Gómez Ropiñon (Note: In this Spanish name, the first or paternal surname is Gómez and the second or maternal family name is Ropiñon.) (born 19 April 1984) is a Spanish judoka. She competed at the 2016 Summer Olympics in the women's 52 kg event, in which she was eliminated in the second round by Andreea Chițu.
