= 2024 World Judo Championships – Men's 81 kg =

Judo competition

Judo Men's 81 kg at the 2024 World Judo Championships
- Venue: Mubadala Arena
- Location: Abu Dhabi, United Arab Emirates
- Date: 21 May 2024
- Competitors: 60 from 48 nations
- Total prize money: €57,000

Medalists
gold medal	Tato Grigalashvili (3rd title)	Georgia
silver medal	Timur Arbuzov
bronze medal	Lee Joon-hwan	South Korea
bronze medal	Somon Makhmadbekov	Tajikistan

Competition at external databases
- Links: IJF • JudoInside

The Men's 81 kg event at the 2024 World Judo Championships was held at the Mubadala Arena in Abu Dhabi, United Arab Emirates on 21 May 2024.

== Results ==
=== Finals ===
Semi-finals
Timur Arbuzov	10
(Georgia (country)) Dimitri Gochilaidze	00
(Georgia (country)) Tato Grigalashvili	01 (yellow card)
(South Korea) Lee Joon-hwan	00 (yellow card)

Final
Timur Arbuzov	00 (yellow card)
(Georgia (country)) Tato Grigalashvili	01

=== Repechage ===
Repechage
(Uzbekistan) Sharofiddin Boltaboev	01 (yellow card)
(Austria) Bernd Fasching	00
(Tajikistan) Somon Makhmadbekov	02 (yellow card)
David Karapetyan	00

Bronze medal
(Uzbekistan) Sharofiddin Boltaboev	00 (yellow card)
(South Korea) Lee Joon-hwan	02
(Tajikistan) Somon Makhmadbekov	01
(Georgia (country)) Dimitri Gochilaidze	00

=== Pool A ===
First round
(Republic of Ireland) Maxim Trigub	10
(Spain) José María Mendiola	00
(Dominican Republic) Medickson del Orbe	00 (yellow card)
(Morocco) Achraf Moutii	10
Timur Arbuzov	10 (yellow card)
(Egypt) Abdelrahman Mohamed	00 (yellow card)
(Kazakhstan) Abylaikhan Zhubanazar
(Czech Republic) Adam Kopecký	w/o
(Argentina) Tomás Morales	00
(Hungary) Attila Ungvári	10
(France) Alpha Oumar Djalo	10 (yellow card)
(Germany) Dominic Ressel	00
(United States) Kell Berliner	00
(Uzbekistan) Sharofiddin Boltaboev	10 (yellow card)

Round of 32
(Belgium) Matthias Casse	10
(Republic of Ireland) Maxim Trigub	00
(Morocco) Achraf Moutii	00
Timur Arbuzov	01 (yellow card)
(Czech Republic) Adam Kopecký	10
(Hungary) Attila Ungvári	00 (yellow card)
(France) Alpha Oumar Djalo	00 (yellow card)
(Uzbekistan) Sharofiddin Boltaboev	10

Round of 16
(Belgium) Matthias Casse	00
Timur Arbuzov	10 (yellow card)
(Czech Republic) Adam Kopecký	01
(Uzbekistan) Sharofiddin Boltaboev	02 (yellow card)

Quarter-finals
Timur Arbuzov	01 (yellow card)
(Uzbekistan) Sharofiddin Boltaboev	00

=== Pool B ===
First round
(Greece) Theodoros Demourtsidis	00 (yellow card)
(Slovenia) Nace Herkovič	10 (yellow card)
(Austria) Bernd Fasching	10
(Benin) Valentin Houinato	00
(Bulgaria) Georgi Gramatikov	02
(Qatar) Khalil Rebahi	01 (yellow card)
(Azerbaijan) Zelim Tckaev	00
(Italy) Antonio Esposito	01 (yellow card)
(Kyrgyzstan) Asad Masabirov	00
(Puerto Rico) Adrián Gandía	02
(Georgia (country)) Dimitri Gochilaidze	10
(Moldova) Mihail Latișev	00
(Romania) Adrian Şulcă	02
(Portugal) Anri Egutidze	01

Round of 32
(Brazil) Guilherme Schimidt	10
(Slovenia) Nace Herkovič	00
(Austria) Bernd Fasching	02
(Bulgaria) Georgi Gramatikov	01
(Italy) Antonio Esposito	01
(Puerto Rico) Adrián Gandía	00
(Georgia (country)) Dimitri Gochilaidze	01
(Romania) Adrian Şulcă	00 (yellow card)

Round of 16
(Brazil) Guilherme Schimidt	00 (yellow card)
(Austria) Bernd Fasching	02 (yellow card)
(Italy) Antonio Esposito	01
(Georgia (country)) Dimitri Gochilaidze	10

Quarter-finals
(Austria) Bernd Fasching	00
(Georgia (country)) Dimitri Gochilaidze	01

=== Pool C ===
First round
(Germany) Timo Cavelius	11 (yellow card)
(Israel) Sagi Muki	00
(Ukraine) Mykhailo Svidrak	00 (yellow card)
(Turkey) Vedat Albayrak	10 (yellow card)
(Poland) Paweł Drzymał	00
(Austria) Wachid Borchashvili	10
(Tajikistan) Somon Makhmadbekov	01
(France) Daniyl Zoubko	00 (yellow card)
(Netherlands) Frank de Wit	11
(Finland) Eetu Ihanamäki	00 (yellow card)
(Mongolia) Gereltuyaagiin Bolor-Ochir	10
(Hong Kong) Lee Kwok Wing	00 (yellow card)
(Egypt) Abdelrahman Abdelghany	01
(Brazil) Gabriel Falcão	00 (yellow card)

Round of 32
(Georgia (country)) Tato Grigalashvili	11
(Germany) Timo Cavelius	00
(Turkey) Vedat Albayrak	10 (yellow card)
(Austria) Wachid Borchashvili	00
(Tajikistan) Somon Makhmadbekov	10
(Netherlands) Frank de Wit	00
(Mongolia) Gereltuyaagiin Bolor-Ochir	00
(Egypt) Abdelrahman Abdelghany	11

Round of 16
(Georgia (country)) Tato Grigalashvili	10
(Turkey) Vedat Albayrak	00
(Tajikistan) Somon Makhmadbekov	11
(Egypt) Abdelrahman Abdelghany	00

Quarter-finals
(Georgia (country)) Tato Grigalashvili	01
(Tajikistan) Somon Makhmadbekov	00

=== Pool D ===
First round
(Portugal) João Fernando	10
(Belgium) Jarne Duyck	00
(United Arab Emirates) Nugzar Tatalashvili	10 (yellow card)
(Switzerland) Aurélien Bonferroni	00
(Japan) Yuhei Oino	10 (yellow card)
(Bahrain) Askerbii Gerbekov	00
(Canada) François Gauthier-Drapeau	10
(Chile) Jorge Pérez	00
(Greece) Athanasios Mylonelis	02
(Moldova) Victor Sterpu	00
(Uruguay) Alain Mikael Aprahamian	00
(United Kingdom) Lachlan Moorhead	10 (yellow card)
(United States) Nicolas Yonezuka	00 (yellow card)
David Karapetyan	10 (yellow card)

Round of 32
(South Korea) Lee Joon-hwan	01
(Portugal) João Fernando	00
(United Arab Emirates) Nugzar Tatalashvili	00
(Japan) Yuhei Oino	10 (yellow card)
(Canada) François Gauthier-Drapeau	10 (yellow card)
(Greece) Athanasios Mylonelis	00
(United Kingdom) Lachlan Moorhead	00
David Karapetyan	02

Round of 16
(South Korea) Lee Joon-hwan	02
(Japan) Yuhei Oino	00
(Canada) François Gauthier-Drapeau	00
David Karapetyan	11 (yellow card)

Quarter-finals
(South Korea) Lee Joon-hwan	10 (yellow card)
David Karapetyan	00

== Prize money ==
The sums listed bring the total prizes awarded to €57,000 for the individual event.

Medal	Total	Judoka	Coach
Gold	€26,000	€20,800	€5,200
Silver	€15,000	€12,000	€3,000
Bronze	€8,000	€6,400	€1,600
