= 2025 World Judo Championships – Men's 81 kg =

Judo competition

Judo Men's 81 kg at the 2025 World Judo Championships
- Venue: László Papp Budapest Sports Arena
- Location: Budapest, Hungary
- Date: 16 June 2025
- Competitors: 45 from 39 nations
- Total prize money: €57,000

Medalists
gold medal	Timur Arbuzov (1st title)
silver medal	Tato Grigalashvili	Georgia
bronze medal	Zelim Tckaev	Azerbaijan
bronze medal	Lee Joon-hwan	South Korea

Competition at external databases
- Links: IJF • JudoInside

The 2025 World Judo Championships was held at the László Papp Budapest Sports Arena in Budapest, Hungary on 16 June 2025.

== Results ==
=== Finals ===
Semi-finals
(Uzbekistan) Arslonbek Tojiev	000
(International Judo Federation) Timur Arbuzov	020
(Azerbaijan) Zelim Tckaev	000
(Georgia (country)) Tato Grigalashvili	002

Final
(International Judo Federation) Timur Arbuzov	100 (yellow card)
(Georgia (country)) Tato Grigalashvili	000

=== Repechage ===
Repechage
(United Arab Emirates) Nugzar Tatalashvili	001 (yellow card)
(Dominican Republic) Medickson del Orbe	000 (yellow card)
(South Korea) Lee Joon-hwan	100
(Belgium) Matthias Casse	000 (yellow card)

Bronze medal
(United Arab Emirates) Nugzar Tatalashvili	000
(Azerbaijan) Zelim Tckaev	100
(South Korea) Lee Joon-hwan	110 (yellow card)
(Uzbekistan) Arslonbek Tojiev	001

=== Pool A ===
First round
(Portugal) João Fernando	010 (yellow card)
(Hungary) Attila Ungvári	000
(Austria) Bernd Fasching	000
(United Arab Emirates) Nugzar Tatalashvili	010 (yellow card)
(Uzbekistan) Arslonbek Tojiev	101
(Italy) Antonio Esposito	001

Round of 32
(Tajikistan) Somon Makhmadbekov	000 (yellow card)
(Portugal) João Fernando	001
(United Arab Emirates) Nugzar Tatalashvili	010
(Mongolia) Oyunchimegiin Shinebayar	000
(Japan) Takanori Nagase	000
(Uzbekistan) Arslonbek Tojiev	100
(Egypt) Abdelrahman Abdelghany	020
(Cyprus) Odysseas Georgakis	000

Round of 16
(Portugal) João Fernando	000
(United Arab Emirates) Nugzar Tatalashvili	100
(Uzbekistan) Arslonbek Tojiev	010 (yellow card)
(Egypt) Abdelrahman Abdelghany	000 (yellow card)

Quarter-finals
(United Arab Emirates) Nugzar Tatalashvili	000
(Uzbekistan) Arslonbek Tojiev	100

=== Pool B ===
First round
(Moldova) Petru Pelivan	000 (yellow card)
(Kazakhstan) Abylaikhan Zhubanazar	001
(Switzerland) Aurélien Bonferroni	000
(Georgia (country)) Zaur Dvalashvili	001
(Czech Republic) Jan Svoboda	100 (yellow card)
(Slovenia) Nace Herkovič	000 (yellow card)

Round of 32
(International Judo Federation) Timur Arbuzov	020
(Benin) Valentin Houinato	000 (yellow card)
(Kazakhstan) Abylaikhan Zhubanazar	002 (yellow card)
(Brazil) Gabriel Falcão	000 (yellow card)
(Canada) François Gauthier-Drapeau	000
(Georgia (country)) Zaur Dvalashvili	100
(Czech Republic) Jan Svoboda	000
(Dominican Republic) Medickson del Orbe	100

Round of 16
(International Judo Federation) Timur Arbuzov	100
(Kazakhstan) Abylaikhan Zhubanazar	000
(Georgia (country)) Zaur Dvalashvili	000 (yellow card)
(Dominican Republic) Medickson del Orbe	100

Quarter-finals
(International Judo Federation) Timur Arbuzov	111
(Dominican Republic) Medickson del Orbe	000

=== Pool C ===
First round
(Germany) Timo Cavelius	100
(Finland) Eetu Ihanamäki	000
(France) Arnaud Aregba	000
(Moldova) Victor Sterpu	100 (yellow card)
(Poland) Paweł Drzymał	000
(China) Wang Jiangnan	100
(Puerto Rico) Adrián Gandía	001
(Bahrain) Askerbii Gerbekov	000

Round of 32
(South Korea) Lee Joon-hwan	100
(Germany) Timo Cavelius	000
(Moldova) Victor Sterpu	100
(Hungary) Botond Tóth	000
(Azerbaijan) Zelim Tckaev	110
(China) Wang Jiangnan	000
(Puerto Rico) Adrián Gandía	000
(Brazil) Luan Almeida	001 (yellow card)

Round of 16
(South Korea) Lee Joon-hwan	011
(Moldova) Victor Sterpu	000
(Azerbaijan) Zelim Tckaev	101 (yellow card)
(Brazil) Luan Almeida	000 (yellow card)

Quarter-finals
(South Korea) Lee Joon-hwan	000 (yellow card)
(Azerbaijan) Zelim Tckaev	011 (yellow card)

=== Pool D ===
First round
(Venezuela) Luis Pariche	000 (yellow card)
(Turkey) Vedat Albayrak	100 (yellow card)
~~(Senegal) Namory Keita~~
(Bulgaria) Georgi Gramatikov	w/o
(United Arab Emirates) Gadzhimurad Omarov	100
(United States) Johan Silot	000

Round of 32
(Georgia (country)) Tato Grigalashvili	010
(Turkey) Vedat Albayrak	000 (yellow card)
(Bulgaria) Georgi Gramatikov	020
(Chile) Jorge Pérez	000
(Belgium) Matthias Casse	100
(Austria) Shamil Borchashvili	000
(United Arab Emirates) Gadzhimurad Omarov	100
Arab Sibghatullah	000 (yellow card)

Round of 16
(Georgia (country)) Tato Grigalashvili	100
(Bulgaria) Georgi Gramatikov	000
(Belgium) Matthias Casse	002
(United Arab Emirates) Gadzhimurad Omarov	000

Quarter-finals
(Georgia (country)) Tato Grigalashvili	101 (yellow card)
(Belgium) Matthias Casse	001

== Prize money ==
The sums listed bring the total prizes awarded to €57,000 for the individual event.

Medal	Total	Judoka	Coach
Gold	€26,000	€20,800	€5,200
Silver	€15,000	€12,000	€3,000
Bronze	€8,000	€6,400	€1,600
