= 2025 European Judo Championships – Men's 81 kg =

Judo competition

Judo Men's 81 kg at the 2025 European Judo Championships
- Venue: Morača Sports Center
- Location: Podgorica, Montenegro
- Date: 25 April 2025
- Competitors: 39 from 28 nations

Medalists
gold medal	Timur Arbuzov (1st title)
silver medal	Tato Grigalashvili	Georgia
bronze medal	Matthias Casse	Belgium
bronze medal	Zelim Tckaev	Azerbaijan

Competition at external databases
- Links: IJF • JudoInside

The men's 81 kg competition at the 2025 European Judo Championships was held at the Morača Sports Center in Podgorica, Montenegro on 25 April 2025.

== Results ==
=== Finals ===
Semi-finals
(Georgia (country)) Tato Grigalashvili	100
(Azerbaijan) Zelim Tckaev	000 (yellow card)
(Belgium) Matthias Casse	000
(International Judo Federation) Timur Arbuzov	001

Final
(Georgia (country)) Tato Grigalashvili	000
(International Judo Federation) Timur Arbuzov	001

=== Repechage ===
Repechage
(Bulgaria) Hristo Valkov	000
(Italy) Antonio Esposito	100
(Montenegro) Nikola Gardašević	000
(Moldova) Petru Pelivan	101

Bronze medal
(Italy) Antonio Esposito	000
(Belgium) Matthias Casse	001 (yellow card)
(Moldova) Petru Pelivan	000
(Azerbaijan) Zelim Tckaev	100 (yellow card)

=== Pool A ===
First round
(Poland) Paweł Drzymał	000
(Ukraine) Vladyslav Kolobov	110
(Montenegro) Nebojša Gardašević	000 (yellow card)
(Bulgaria) Hristo Valkov	102 (yellow card)

Round of 32
(Georgia (country)) Tato Grigalashvili	001
(Ukraine) Vladyslav Kolobov	000 (yellow card)
(Bosnia and Herzegovina) Mustafa Hebib	000 (yellow card)
(Czech Republic) Jan Svoboda	010 (yellow card)
(Hungary) Attila Ungvári	000
(Bulgaria) Hristo Valkov	001 (yellow card)
(Albania) Indrit Cullhaj	000
(Slovenia) Nace Herkovič	020 (yellow card)

Round of 16
(Georgia (country)) Tato Grigalashvili	100
(Czech Republic) Jan Svoboda	000
(Bulgaria) Hristo Valkov	010
(Slovenia) Nace Herkovič	000 (yellow card)

Quarter-finals
(Georgia (country)) Tato Grigalashvili	100
(Bulgaria) Hristo Valkov	000 (yellow card)

=== Pool B ===
First round
(Greece) Michail Tsoutlasvili	000 (yellow card)
(Moldova) Dorin Gotonoaga	101 (yellow card)
(North Macedonia) Edi Šerifovski	000
(Turkey) Muhammed Koç	100 (yellow card)

Round of 32
(Azerbaijan) Zelim Tckaev	100
(Switzerland) Aurélien Bonferroni	000
(Moldova) Dorin Gotonoaga	100
(Serbia) Mihajlo Simin	000
(Italy) Antonio Esposito	001
(Austria) Bernd Fasching	000 (yellow card)
(Turkey) Muhammed Koç	100
(International Judo Federation) Hleb Khatkouski	000 (yellow card)

Round of 16
(Azerbaijan) Zelim Tckaev	100
(Moldova) Dorin Gotonoaga	000
(Italy) Antonio Esposito	001
(Turkey) Muhammed Koç	000

Quarter-finals
(Azerbaijan) Zelim Tckaev	100
(Italy) Antonio Esposito	000

=== Pool C ===
First round
(Albania) Jon Vrenozi	000 (yellow card)
(Finland) Eetu Ihanamäki	011
(Bulgaria) Georgi Gramatikov	021 (yellow card)
(Luxembourg) Claudio Nunes Dos Santos	000 (yellow card)

Round of 32
(Belgium) Matthias Casse	010
(Portugal) João Fernando	000 (yellow card)
(Finland) Eetu Ihanamäki	000
(Azerbaijan) Omar Rajabli	001
(Germany) Timo Cavelius	101 (yellow card)
(Czech Republic) Petr Mladý	000 (yellow card)
(Bulgaria) Georgi Gramatikov	000 (yellow card)
(Montenegro) Nikola Gardašević	010 (yellow card)

Round of 16
(Belgium) Matthias Casse	011
(Azerbaijan) Omar Rajabli	000
(Germany) Timo Cavelius	000
(Montenegro) Nikola Gardašević	001 (yellow card)

Quarter-finals
(Belgium) Matthias Casse	001
(Montenegro) Nikola Gardašević	000

=== Pool D ===
First round
(Cyprus) Odysseas Georgakis	000
(Moldova) Petru Pelivan	100

Round of 32
(International Judo Federation) Timur Arbuzov	020
(Armenia) Grigorii Pasevin	000 (yellow card)
(Greece) Aris Zaragkas	011
(France) Arnaud Aregba	020 (yellow card)
(Turkey) Vedat Albayrak	100
(Hungary) Botond Tóth	000
(Moldova) Petru Pelivan	100 (yellow card)
(Austria) Magamed Borchashvilli	000 (yellow card)

Round of 16
(International Judo Federation) Timur Arbuzov	101
(France) Arnaud Aregba	000 (yellow card)
(Turkey) Vedat Albayrak	000
(Moldova) Petru Pelivan	010 (yellow card)

Quarter-finals
(International Judo Federation) Timur Arbuzov	101
(Moldova) Petru Pelivan	000
