= 2026 European Judo Championships – Men's 81 kg =

Judo competition

Judo Men's 81 kg at the 2026 European Judo Championships
- Venue: Olympic Palace
- Location: Tbilisi, Georgia
- Date: 18 April 2026
- Competitors: 39 from 28 nations

Medalists
gold medal	Timur Arbuzov (2nd title)	Russia
silver medal	Tato Grigalashvili	Georgia
bronze medal	Zelim Tckaev	Azerbaijan
bronze medal	Mihajlo Simin	Serbia

Competition at external databases
- Links: IJF

The men's 81 kg event at the 2026 European Judo Championships was held at the Olympic Palace in Tbilisi, Georgia on 18 April 2026.

== Results ==
=== Finals ===
Semi-finals
(Russia) Timur Arbuzov	001
(Serbia) Mihajlo Simin	000 (yellow card)
(Georgia (country)) Tato Grigalashvili	001 (yellow card)
(Azerbaijan) Zelim Tckaev	000 (yellow card)

Final
(Russia) Timur Arbuzov	111
(Georgia (country)) Tato Grigalashvili	000

=== Repechage ===
Repechage
(Ukraine) Mykhailo Svidrak	000 (yellow card)
(Belgium) Matthias Casse	002
(Finland) Eetu Ihanamäki	100 (yellow card)
(Serbia) Vasilije Grujičić	000

Bronze medal
(Belgium) Matthias Casse	000
(Azerbaijan) Zelim Tckaev	010 (yellow card)
(Finland) Eetu Ihanamäki	000 (yellow card)
(Serbia) Mihajlo Simin	001

=== Pool A ===
First round
(Luxembourg) Claudio Nunes Dos Santos	000 (yellow card)
(Bosnia and Herzegovina) Mustafa Hebib	001 (yellow card)

Round of 32
(Russia) Timur Arbuzov	022
(Switzerland) Aurélien Bonferroni	000
(Belarus) Maksim Charniak	021
(Greece) Michail Tsoutlasvili	001
(Ukraine) Mykhailo Svidrak	100 (yellow card)
(Bosnia and Herzegovina) Mustafa Hebib	000 (yellow card)
(Israel) Itay Bibitko	000 (yellow card)
(Italy) Antonio Esposito	100 (yellow card)

Round of 16
(Russia) Timur Arbuzov	101
(Belarus) Maksim Charniak	000
(Ukraine) Mykhailo Svidrak	101
(Italy) Antonio Esposito	000 (yellow card)

Quarter-finals
(Russia) Timur Arbuzov	100
(Ukraine) Mykhailo Svidrak	000

=== Pool B ===
First round
(Moldova) Victor Sterpu	000 (yellow card)
(Austria) Bernd Fasching	001 (yellow card)
(Albania) Indrit Cullhaj	000
(Estonia) Saad Dikajev	011

Round of 32
(Turkey) Vedat Albayrak	001
(Austria) Bernd Fasching	100
(Cyprus) Odysseas Georgakis	000 (yellow card)
(Serbia) Mihajlo Simin	001 (yellow card)
(Belgium) Matthias Casse	101
(Bulgaria) Hristo Valkov	000 (yellow card)
(Estonia) Saad Dikajev	000
(Hungary) Benedek Tóth	102

Round of 16
(Austria) Bernd Fasching	000 (yellow card)
(Serbia) Mihajlo Simin	001
(Belgium) Matthias Casse	001
(Hungary) Benedek Tóth	000 (yellow card)

Quarter-finals
(Serbia) Mihajlo Simin	011
(Belgium) Matthias Casse	000

=== Pool C ===
First round
(Belarus) Anton Dubovik	000
(Lithuania) Kęstutis Vitkauskas	100

Round of 32
(Georgia (country)) Tato Grigalashvili	020
(Austria) Magamed Borchashvilli	000 (yellow card)
(Greece) Aris Zaragkas	020
(Albania) Jon Vrenozi	000
(Finland) Eetu Ihanamäki	100
(Romania) Adrian Şulcă	000
(Lithuania) Kęstutis Vitkauskas	000
(Italy) Leonardo Casaglia	010

Round of 16
(Georgia (country)) Tato Grigalashvili	001
(Greece) Aris Zaragkas	000
(Finland) Eetu Ihanamäki	100 (yellow card)
(Italy) Leonardo Casaglia	000

Quarter-finals
(Georgia (country)) Tato Grigalashvili	001 (yellow card)
(Finland) Eetu Ihanamäki	000

=== Pool D ===
First round
(Slovenia) Nace Herkovič	010
(Ukraine) Vladyslav Kolobov	000
(Montenegro) Jahja Nurković	001 (yellow card)
(Russia) Abdul-Kerim Tasuev	010

Round of 32
(Azerbaijan) Zelim Tckaev	020
(Slovenia) Nace Herkovič	000
(Czech Republic) Petr Mladý	000
(Bulgaria) Georgi Gramatikov	020 (yellow card)
(Azerbaijan) Omar Rajabli	001 (yellow card)
(Russia) Abdul-Kerim Tasuev	000
(Moldova) Petru Pelivan	010
(Serbia) Vasilije Grujičić	100

Round of 16
(Azerbaijan) Zelim Tckaev	102
(Bulgaria) Georgi Gramatikov	000 (yellow card)
(Azerbaijan) Omar Rajabli	000 (yellow card)
(Serbia) Vasilije Grujičić	100

Quarter-finals
(Azerbaijan) Zelim Tckaev	103
(Serbia) Vasilije Grujičić	000
