= Georgia at the 2024 Summer Olympics =

- Flag of Georgia
- IOC code: GEO
- NOC: Georgian National Olympic Committee
- Website: www.geonoc.org.ge (in Georgian and English)

in Paris, France 26 July 2024 – 11 August 2024
- Competitors: 28 (21 men and 7 women) in 9 sports
- Flag bearers (opening): Lasha Talakhadze & Nino Salukvadze
- Flag bearer (closing): Geno Petriashvili
- Medals Ranked 24th: Gold 3 Silver 3 Bronze 1 Total 7

Summer Olympics appearances (overview)
- 1996; 2000; 2004; 2008; 2012; 2016; 2020; 2024

Other related appearances
- Russian Empire (1900–1912); Soviet Union (1952–1988); Unified Team (1992)

Georgia competed at the 2024 Summer Olympics in Paris from 26 July to 11 August 2024. It was the nation's eighth consecutive appearance at the Summer Olympics in the post-Soviet era.

Guram Tushishvili was disqualified from Judo after committing unsportsmanlike conduct to eventual gold metalist Teddy Riner of France, resulting in his disqualification and being banned from partaking in future events.

== Medalists ==
Medal	Name	Sport	Event	Date
Gold	Lasha Bekauri	Judo	Men's 90 kg	31 July
Gold	Geno Petriashvili	Wrestling	Men's freestyle 125 kg	10 August
Gold	Lasha Talakhadze	Weightlifting	Men's +102 kg	11 August
Silver	Tato Grigalashvili	Judo	Men's 81 kg	30 July
Silver	Ilia Sulamanidze	Judo	Men's 100 kg	1 August
Silver	Givi Matcharashvili	Wrestling	Men's freestyle 97 kg	11 August
Bronze	Lasha Guruli	Boxing	Men's lightweight	4 August

== Competitors ==
The following is the list of number of competitors in the Games.

Sport	Men	Women	Total
Athletics	0	1	1
Boxing	2	0	2
Fencing	1	0	1
Judo	7	3	10
Gymnastics	0	1	1
Shooting	0	1	1
Swimming	1	1	2
Weightlifting	3	0	3
Wrestling	7	0	7
Total	21	7	28

== Athletics ==
Georgian track athlete qualified for Paris 2024, by receiving the direct universality spots in the following event:

Key

- Note–Ranks given for track events are within the athlete's heat only
- Q = Qualified for the next round
- q = Qualified for the next round as a fastest loser or, in field events, by position without achieving the qualifying target
- NR = National record
- N/A = Round not applicable for the event
- Bye = Athlete not required to compete in round

Track and road events

Athlete	Event	Preliminary		Heat		Semifinal		Final	
Athlete	Event	Result	Rank	Result	Rank	Result	Rank	Result	Rank
Lika Kharchilava	Women's 100 m	12.37	20	Did not advance					

== Boxing ==
Georgia entered two boxers into the Olympic tournament. Tokyo 2020 Olympian Lasha Guruli scored an outright quarterfinal victory to secure a spot in the men's lightweight division at the 2023 European Games in Nowy Targ, Poland. Georgii Kushitashvili (men's heavyweight) secured his spot following the triumph in quota bouts round, at the 2024 World Olympic Qualification Tournament 2 in Bangkok, Thailand.

Athlete	Event	Round of 32	Round of 16	Quarterfinals	Semifinals	Final	
Athlete	Event	Opposition Result	Opposition Result	Opposition Result	Opposition Result	Opposition Result	Rank
Lasha Guruli	Men's 63.5 kg	Bye	Hasanov (AZE); W 5–0	Mukhammedsabyr (KAZ); W 3–2	Álvarez (CUB); L 0–5	Did not advance	3rd place, bronze medalist(s)
Georgii Kushitashvili	Men's 92 kg	—N/a	Boltaev (TJK); L 2–3	Did not advance			9

== Fencing ==
Georgia entered one fencer into the Olympic competition. Sandro Bazadze secured his quota places in men's sabre events, after nominated as one of two highest ranked individual fencers, eligible for European zone through the release of the FIE Official ranking for Paris 2024.

Athlete	Event	Round of 64	Round of 32	Round of 16	Quarterfinal	Semifinal	Final / BM	
Athlete	Event	Opposition Score	Opposition Score	Opposition Score	Opposition Score	Opposition Score	Opposition Score	Rank
Sandro Bazadze	Men's sabre	Bye	Zea (MEX); W 15–6	Amer (EGY); L 14–15	Did not advance			9

== Gymnastics ==
=== Trampoline ===
Georgia entered one gymnast (one female) into the 2024 Summer Olympics trampoline competition through the World Cup Series ranking.

Athlete	Event	Qualification		Final	
Athlete	Event	Score	Rank	Score	Rank
Luba Golovina	Women's	53.620	11	Did not advance	

== Judo ==
Georgia has qualified ten judokas via the IJF World Ranking List and continental quotas in Europe.

Men

Athlete	Event	Round of 64	Round of 32	Round of 16	Quarterfinals	Semifinals	Repechage	Final / BM	
Athlete	Event	Opposition Result	Opposition Result	Opposition Result	Opposition Result	Opposition Result	Opposition Result	Rank	
Giorgi Sardalashvili	–60 kg	—N/a	Bye	Wolczak (ISR); W 11–00	Yıldız (TUR); L 00–01	Did not advance	Kim W-j (KOR); W 10–00	Garrigós (ESP); L 00–01	5
Vazha Margvelashvili	–66 kg	—N/a	Bye	Khyar (FRA); L 00–10	Did not advance				9
Lasha Shavdatuashvili	–73 kg	—N/a	Gaba (FRA); L 00–10	Did not advance					17
Tato Grigalashvili	–81 kg	Bye	Latișev (MDA); W 10–00	Borchashvili (AUT); W 01–00	Makhmadbekov (TJK); W 01–00	Lee (KOR); W 01–00	—N/a	Nagase (JPN); L 00–11	2nd place, silver medalist(s)
Lasha Bekauri	–90 kg	—N/a	Bye	Ivanov (BUL); W 01–00	Han (KOR); W 10–00	Mosakhlishvili (ESP); W 10–00	—N/a	Murao (JPN); W 10–01	1st place, gold medalist(s)
Ilia Sulamanidze	–100 kg	—N/a	Bye	Pirelli (ITA); W 10–00	Wolf (JPN); W 01–00	Eich (SUI); W 10–00	—N/a	Kotsoiev (AZE); L 01–10	2nd place, silver medalist(s)
Guram Tushishvili	+100 kg	—N/a	Bye	Ndiaye (SEN); W 10–00	Riner (FRA); L 00–10	Did not advance	Yusupov (UZB); L DSQ	Did not advance	7

Women

Athlete	Event	Round of 64	Round of 32	Round of 16	Quarterfinals	Semifinals	Repechage	Final / BM	
Athlete	Event	Opposition Result	Opposition Result	Opposition Result	Opposition Result	Opposition Result	Opposition Result	Rank	
Eteri Liparteliani	–57 kg	—N/a	Nairne (GBR); W 10–00	Aminova (UZB); W 01–00	Silva (BRA); L 00–10	Did not advance	Lkhagvatogoo (MGL); W 10–00	Cysique (FRA); L 00–11	5
Eter Askilashvili	–63 kg	—N/a	Leški (SLO); L 00–10	Did not advance					17
Sophio Somkhishvili	+78 kg	—N/a	Lucht (GER); W 10–00	Dicko (FRA); L 00–10	Did not advance				9

Mixed

Athlete	Event	Round of 32	Round of 16	Quarterfinals	Semifinals	Repechage	Final / BM	
Athlete	Event	Opposition Result	Opposition Result	Opposition Result	Opposition Result	Opposition Result	Opposition Result	Rank
Giorgi Sardalashvili; Vazha Margvelashvili; Lasha Shavdatuashvili; Tato Grigalashvili; Lasha Bekauri; Ilia Sulamanidze; ~~Guram Tushishvili~~; Eteri Liparteliani; Eter Askilashvili; Sophio Somkhishvili	Team	Bye	Italy; L 3–4	Did not advance				9

== Shooting ==
Georgian shooters achieved quota places for the following events based on their results at the 2022 and 2023 ISSF World Championships, 2022, 2023, and 2024 European Championships, 2023 European Games, and 2024 ISSF World Olympic Qualification Tournament.

Athlete	Event	Qualification		Final	
Athlete	Event	Points	Rank	Points	Rank
Nino Salukvadze	Women's 10 m air pistol	562	38	Did not advance	
Nino Salukvadze	Women's 25 m pistol	563	40	Did not advance	

== Swimming ==
Georgia sent two swimmers to compete at the 2024 Paris Olympics.

Athlete	Event	Heat		Semifinal		Final	
Athlete	Event	Time	Rank	Time	Rank	Time	Rank
Noe Pantskhava	Men's 100 m backstroke	56.46	41	Did not advance			
Ana Nizharadze	Women's 100 m butterfly	1:02.85	28	Did not advance			

== Weightlifting ==
Georgia entered three weightlifters into the Olympic competition. Shota Mishvelidze (men's 61 kg), Irakli Chkheidze (men's 102 kg) and Lasha Talakhadze (men's +102 kg) secured one of the top ten slots in their respective weight divisions based on the IWF Olympic Qualification Rankings.

Athlete	Event	Snatch		Clean & Jerk		Total	Rank
Athlete	Event	Result	Rank	Result	Rank	Total	Rank
Shota Mishvelidze	Men's −61 kg	121	6	135	6	256	6
Irakli Chkheidze	Men's −102 kg	179	7	214	4	393	5
Lasha Talakhadze	Men's +102 kg	215	2	255	1	470	1st place, gold medalist(s)

== Wrestling ==
Georgia qualified seven wrestlers for the following events. Two wrestlers qualified for the games through top five results at the 2023 World Championships in Belgrade, Serbia; two wrestlers qualified for the games after winning the semifinal match at the 2024 European Qualification Tournament in Baku, Azerbaijan; and two wrestlers qualified through the 2024 World Qualification Tournament in Istanbul, Turkey.

Key:

- VT (ranking points: 5–0 or 0–5) – Victory by fall.
- VB (ranking points: 5–0 or 0–5) – Victory by injury (VF for forfeit, VA for withdrawal or disqualification)
- PP (ranking points: 3–1 or 1–3) – Decision by points – the loser with technical points.
- PO (ranking points: 3–0 or 0–3) – Decision by points – the loser without technical points.
- ST (ranking points: 4–0 or 0–4) – Great superiority – the loser without technical points and a margin of victory of at least 8 (Greco-Roman) or 10 (freestyle) points.
- SP (ranking points: 4–1 or 1–4) – Technical superiority – the loser with technical points and a margin of victory of at least 8 (Greco-Roman) or 10 (freestyle) points.

Freestyle

Athlete	Event	Round of 16	Quarterfinal	Semifinal	Repechage	Final / BM	
Athlete	Event	Opposition Result	Opposition Result	Opposition Result	Opposition Result	Opposition Result	Rank
Goderdzi Dzebisashvili	Men's −65 kg	Tevanyan (ARM); L 0–11 ^{ST}	Did not advance				15
Vladimeri Gamkrelidze	Men's −86 kg	Shapiev (UZB); L 1–5 ^{PP}	Did not advance				13
Givi Matcharashvili	Men's −97 kg	De Lange (RSA); W 12–2 ^{SP}	Mchedlidze (UKR); W 11–0 ^{ST}	Magomedov (AZE); W 5–0 ^{PO}	—N/a	Tazhudinov (BRN); L 0–2 ^{VT}	2nd place, silver medalist(s)
Geno Petriashvili	Men's −125 kg	Khotsianivskyi (UKR); W 11–0 ^{ST}	Baran (POL); W 9–2 ^{PP}	Meshvildishvili (AZE); W 7–0 ^{PO}	—N/a	Zare (IRI); W 10–9 ^{PP}	1st place, gold medalist(s)

Greco-Roman

Athlete	Event	Round of 16	Quarterfinal	Semifinal	Repechage	Final / BM	
Athlete	Event	Opposition Result	Opposition Result	Opposition Result	Opposition Result	Opposition Result	Rank
Ramaz Zoidze	Men's −67 kg	Ismailov (KGZ); L 1–12 ^{SP}	Did not advance				12
Lasha Gobadze	Men's −87 kg	Sid Azara (ALG); W 2–1 ^{PP}	Novikov (BUL); L 3–8 ^{PP}	Did not advance	Bisultanov (DEN); L 0–6 ^{PO}	Did not advance	9
Robert Kobliashvili	Men's −97 kg	Khaslakhanau (AIN); L 1–9 ^{SP}	Did not advance				15

== See also ==
- Georgia at the 2024 Winter Youth Olympics
- Georgia at the 2024 Summer Paralympics
