= Zelim Tckaev =

Russian-Azerbaijani judoka (1999)

Personal information
- Native name: Зелим Цыккаты; Zelim Tçkayev
- Born: 2 May 1999 (age 27)
- Occupation: Judoka

Sport
- Country: Azerbaijan
- Sport: Judo
- Weight class: ‍–‍81 kg
- Coached by: Rashad Hasanov

Achievements and titles
- Olympic Games: R32 (2024)
- World Champ.: (silver) (2026)
- European Champ.: (bronze) (2025, 2026)
- Highest world ranking: 2^{nd}
Medal record
Men's judo
Representing Azerbaijan
World Championships
Silver medal – second place	2026 Baku	‍–‍81 kg
Bronze medal – third place	2025 Budapest	‍–‍81 kg
European Championships
Bronze medal – third place	2025 Podgorica	‍–‍81 kg
Bronze medal – third place	2026 Tbilisi	‍–‍81 kg
IJF Grand Slam
Gold medal – first place	2023 Baku	‍–‍81 kg
Gold medal – first place	2024 Baku	‍–‍81 kg
Gold medal – first place	2024 Abu Dhabi	‍–‍81 kg
Gold medal – first place	2025 Baku	‍–‍81 kg
Silver medal – second place	2024 Paris	‍–‍81 kg
Silver medal – second place	2026 Paris	‍–‍81 kg
Bronze medal – third place	2022 Abu Dhabi	‍–‍81 kg
Bronze medal – third place	2023 Tokyo	‍–‍81 kg
IJF Grand Prix
Gold medal – first place	2026 Qingdao	‍–‍81 kg
European Cadet Championships
Gold medal – first place	2016 Vantaa	‍–‍73 kg
Islamic Solidarity Games
Gold medal – first place	2021 Konya	Men's team

Profile at external databases
- IJF: 51301
- JudoInside.com: 105562
- Updated on 7 October 2026

Zelim Alanovich Tckaev (Iron Ossetic: Цыккаты Аланы фырт Зелим; Azerbaijani: Zəlim Alanoviç Tçkayev; born 2 May 1999) is an Azerbaijani judoka of Ossetian origin. He is a member of the Azerbaijan national judo team, a three-time winner of the Grand Slam tournament in Baku (2023, 2024, 2025), and a national champion of Azerbaijan (2022, 2024). Tckaev represented Azerbaijan at the 2024 Summer Olympics.

== Biography ==
Zelim Alanovich Tckaev was born on 2 May 1999. His older brother, Lazar Tckaev, is a silver and bronze medalist in Russian youth sambo championships for athletes under 23 years old.

In 2015, Tckaev won silver at the Russian Cadet Sambo Championship and was the champion of the Russian Students' Spartakiad in sambo among boys. In 2016, he became a Russian and World Sambo Champion, as well as a gold medalist at the 2016 European Cadet Judo Championships. In 2017, he repeated his victories at the Russian and World Sambo Championships in Serbia.

On 6 April 2017, Tckaev was awarded the title of Master of Sports of Russia in sambo by the Russian Ministry of Sports.

In January 2021, Tckaev debuted for the Azerbaijan national judo team at the Tel Aviv Grand Slam.

In the summer of 2022, at the 5th Islamic Solidarity Games in Konya, Turkey, Tckaev won gold in the men's team event. In October of the same year, he won bronze at the Abu Dhabi Grand Slam.

In September 2023, Tckaev won the Baku Grand Slam, defeating Olympic medalist Shamil Borchashvili of Austria in the final. In December 2023, he earned a bronze medal at the Tokyo Grand Slam.

In February 2024, Tckaev secured another gold medal at the Baku Grand Slam, defeating compatriot Omar Rajabli in the final. In April 2024, he won silver at the Paris Grand Slam.

In May 2024, Tckaev participated in the 2024 World Judo Championships in Abu Dhabi, where he was defeated in his opening match by Antonio Esposito of Italy. Shortly after, the International Judo Federation confirmed Tckaev's Olympic qualification, ranking him sixth in the men's -81 kg category.

At the 2024 Summer Olympics, Tckaev was eliminated in the round of 16, losing to Alpha Oumar Djalo of France.

In October 2024, Tckaev won gold at the Abu Dhabi Grand Slam.

In December 2024, he clinched gold at the 2024 Azerbaijan Championships. In February 2025, he won another gold medal at Baku Grand Slam.

His personal coach is Rashad Hasanov.

As of April 1, 2026, with a score of 320 points, holds seventh place in the ranking of Azerbaijani athletes according to the Ministry of Youth and Sports.

On October 7, 2026, at the World Judo Championships in Baku, Zelim Tskaev (81 kg) won by ippon over Victor Sterpu in the round of 32, defeated UAE representative Nugzar Tatalashvili in the round of 16, defeated Belgian Matthias Casse in the quarterfinals, defeated Kazakh Abylaikhan Zhubanzar in the semifinals, and lost to Georgian opponent Tato Grigalashvili in the final, winning the silver medal.
