= 2022 European Judo Championships – Men's 81 kg =

Judo Men's 81 kg at the 2022 European Judo Championships
- Venue: Armeets Arena
- Location: Sofia, Bulgaria
- Date: 30 April
- Competitors: 37 from 27 nations

Medalists
gold medal	Tato Grigalashvili (2nd title)	Georgia
silver medal	Matthias Casse	Belgium
bronze medal	Sami Chouchi	Belgium
bronze medal	Attila Ungvári	Hungary

Competition at external databases
- Links: IJF • JudoInside

The men's 81 kg competition at the 2022 European Judo Championships was held on 30 April at the Armeets Arena.

== Results ==
=== Finals ===
Semi-finals
Matthias Casse (BEL)	10
Hievorh Manukian (UKR)	00
Tato Grigalashvili (GEO)	10
Sergii Krivchach (UKR)	00

Final
Matthias Casse (BEL)	00
Tato Grigalashvili (GEO)	11

=== Repechage ===
Repechage
Alfonso Urquiza (ESP)	00
Sami Chouchi (BEL)	10
Attila Ungvári (HUN)	10
Shamil Borchashvili (AUT)	00

Bronze medal
Sami Chouchi (BEL)	01
Sergii Krivchach (UKR)	00
Attila Ungvári (HUN)	01
Hievorh Manukian (UKR)	00

=== Pool A ===
First round
Alex Barto (SVK)	10
Athanasios Mylonelis (GRE)	00

Round of 32
Matthias Casse (BEL)	10
Stuart McWatt (GBR)	00
Alex Barto (SVK)	10
Tommy Macias (SWE)	00
Sagi Muki (ISR)	01
Jan Svoboda (CZE)	00
Róbert Rajkai (HUN)	00
Alfonso Urquiza (ESP)	10

Round of 16
Matthias Casse (BEL)	10
Alex Barto (SVK)	00
Sagi Muki (ISR)	01
Alfonso Urquiza (ESP)	10

Quarterfinals
Matthias Casse (BEL)	10
Alfonso Urquiza (ESP)	00

=== Pool B ===
First round
Eoin Fleming (IRL)	00
Giacomo Gamba (ITA)	10

Round of 32
Sami Chouchi (BEL)	10
Sebastian Marcinkiewicz (POL)	00
Nikola Gardašević (MNE)	00
Uroš Madžarević (SRB)	10
Frank de Wit (NED)	00
Giacomo Gamba (ITA)	10
Nicon Zaboroșciuc (MDA)	00
Hievorh Manukian (UKR)	10

Round of 16
Sami Chouchi (BEL)	10
Uroš Madžarević (SRB)	01
Giacomo Gamba (ITA)	00
Hievorh Manukian (UKR)	01

Quarterfinals
Sami Chouchi (BEL)	00
Hievorh Manukian (UKR)	10

=== Pool C ===
First round
Mihail Latișev (MDA)	00
Edi Šerifovski (MKD)	10

Round of 32
Tato Grigalashvili (GEO)	10
Oskari Mäkinen (FIN)	00
Ashot Martirosyan (BUL)	00
Tim Gramkow (GER)	01
Attila Ungvári (HUN)	10
Damian Stepień (POL)	00
Edi Šerifovski (MKD)	00
Lachlan Moorhead (GBR)	10

Round of 16
Tato Grigalashvili (GEO)	10
Tim Gramkow (GER)	01
Attila Ungvári (HUN)	11
Lachlan Moorhead (GBR)	00

Quarterfinals
Tato Grigalashvili (GEO)	10
Attila Ungvári (HUN)	00

=== Pool D ===
First round
Antonio Esposito (ITA)	10
Bearach Gleeson (IRL)	00
Božidar Vučurević (BIH)	00
Adam Kopecký (CZE)	11

Round of 32
Vedat Albayrak (TUR)	00
Antonio Esposito (ITA)	10
Matej Vidmar (SLO)	00
Sergii Krivchach (UKR)	01
Shamil Borchashvili (AUT)	11
José María Mendiola (ESP)	00
João Fernando (POR)	00
Adam Kopecký (CZE)	01

Round of 16
Antonio Esposito (ITA)	00
Sergii Krivchach (UKR)	10
Shamil Borchashvili (AUT)	10
Adam Kopecký (CZE)	00

Quarterfinals
Sergii Krivchach (UKR)	01
Shamil Borchashvili (AUT)	00
