= Judo at the 2024 Summer Olympics – Men's 81 kg =

Judo Men's 81 kg at the Games of the XXXIII Olympiad
- Venue: Grand Palais Éphémère
- Location: Paris, France
- Date: 30 July 2024
- Competitors: 33 from 33 nations
- Website: Official website

Medalists
gold medal	Takanori Nagase (2nd title)	Japan
silver medal	Tato Grigalashvili	Georgia
bronze medal	Lee Joon-hwan	South Korea
bronze medal	Somon Makhmadbekov	Tajikistan

Competition at external databases
- Links: IJF • JudoInside

The men's 81 kg (half-middleweight) competition in judo at the 2024 Summer Olympics was held on 30 July 2024 at the Grand Palais Éphémère in Paris, France. The event was contested by 33 competitors from 33 nations. Takanori Nagase of Japan won the gold medal after defeating Tato Grigalashvili of Georgia in the final. Lee Joon-hwan of South Korea and Somon Makhmadbekov of Tajikistan won the bronze medals.

== Background ==
Judo was introduced as an Olympic sport at the 1964 Summer Olympics in Tokyo, Japan. After not being included in the 1968 Summer Olympics, it returned for the 1972 edition, and has been part of the Summer Olympic programme ever since. The men's 90 kg category was one of seven weight categories in the men's judo event at the 2024 Summer Olympics.

Japan's Takanori Nagase was the defending Olympic champion, having won the gold medal in the same event at the 2020 Summer Olympics in Tokyo. Mongolia's Saeid Mollaei won the silver medal, while Austria's Shamil Borchashvili and Belgium's Matthias Casse won the bronze medals. Except Mollaei, all the medalists from the previous edition returned to compete in the 2024 edition. In addition to his gold medal at the previous Olympics, Nagase had previously won the bronze medal at the 2016 Summer Olympics in Rio de Janeiro. He has also a gold medal at the 2015 World Judo Championships and bronze medals at the 2022 and 2023 World Judo Championships. Georgia's Tato Grigalashvili was the reigning World Champion, having won the gold medal at the 2022, 2023 and 2024 World Judo Championships. He was also ranked number two in the world heading into the event.

Casse was the top ranked wrestler in the category, and he had won the gold medal at the 2021 World Judo Championships, and silver medals at the 2019, 2022 and 2023 World Judo Championships. Other competitors included South Korea's Lee Joon-hwan, who won the gold medal at the 2024 Asian Judo Championships, the silver medal at the 2022 Asian Games in Hangzhou, and the bronze medal at the 2023 World Judo Championships, and Tajikistan's Somon Makhmadbekov, who was the gold medalist at the 2022 Asian Games and a bronze medalist at the 2024 Asian Judo Championships.

== Format ==
The individual judo competition was competed as a single-elimination tournament. The competitors were divided into two halves with the winner of each match advancing to the next match. The winners of the semifinals of the two halves competed against each other for the gold and silver medals. Each judoka who loses to one of the two finalists moves into the repechage rounds, which is used to determine the bronze medals. The losers of the semifinals compete against the remaining repechage opponent from their half of the bracket in the bronze medal bout. The outcome of each match is determined by the score with points given to various techniques such as ippon, waza-ari, and yuko, and penalties.

== Schedule ==
The men's 81 kg judo event was held on 30 July 2024 at the Grand Palais Éphémère in Paris, France.

All times are Central European Summer Time (UTC+02:00)

Date	Time	Event
Tuesday, 30 July 2024	10:00	Round 1
Tuesday, 30 July 2024	10:00	Elimination round of 16
Tuesday, 30 July 2024	10:00	Quarterfinals
Tuesday, 30 July 2024	14:00	Repechage
Tuesday, 30 July 2024	14:00	Semifinals
Tuesday, 30 July 2024	14:00	Bronze medal matches
Tuesday, 30 July 2024	14:00	Final

== Summary ==
The competition featured 33 judoka representing 33 nations.

Nagase defeated Uruguay's Alain Mikael Aprahamian by an ippon in the round of 32 and Turkey's Vedat Albayrak by a waza-ari in the round of 16. He faced off against Casse in the quarterfinals, who had won his first two matches by ippon. In the quarterfinal, he defeated Casse by a waza-ari using o soto gari before advancing past Italy's Antonio Esposito in the semifinals by means of an ippon.

Grigalashvili defeated Moldova's Mihail Latisev in the round of 32 by hansoku-make after the Moldovan received three shido penalties, and Borchashvili in the round of 16 by waza-ari with a seoi nage at 3 minutes and 41 seconds. In the quarterfinals, Grigalashvili defeated Makhmadbekov after a waza-ari during the golden score period, before overcoming Lee in the semi-finals.

In the final, Nagase defeated Grigalashvili by ippon after two scoring waza-ari with tani otoshi. Both judoka had received a shido penalty for non-combativity earlier in the contest. The victory meant that Nagase retained his Olympic title and Grigalashvili received the silver medal.

In the first bronze-medal contest was between Lee and Casse, Lee defeated the Belgian by waza-ari with a ko uchi gari after 4 minutes and 48 seconds during the golden score period. In the other bronze-medal contest, Makhmadbekov defeated Esposito by ippon with an ura gatame in 1 minute and 24 seconds.

== Results ==
=== Finals ===
Semi-finals
Takanori Nagase (JPN)	10
Antonio Esposito (ITA)	00
Tato Grigalashvili (GEO)	01
Lee Joon-hwan (KOR)	00 (yellow card)

Final
Takanori Nagase (JPN)	11 (yellow card)
Tato Grigalashvili (GEO)	00 (yellow card)

=== Repechage ===
Repechage
Matthias Casse (BEL)	01
François Gauthier-Drapeau (CAN)	00 (yellow card)
Somon Makhmadbekov (TJK)	10
Sharofiddin Boltaboev (UZB)	00

Bronze medal
Matthias Casse (BEL)	00 (yellow card)
Lee Joon-hwan (KOR)	01 (yellow card)
Somon Makhmadbekov (TJK)	10
Antonio Esposito (ITA)	00

=== Pool A ===
First round

Round of 32
Matthias Casse (BEL)	11
Sibghatullah Arab (EOR)	01
Abylaikhan Zhubanazar (KAZ)	00
Attila Ungvári (HUN)	01 (yellow card)
Takanori Nagase (JPN)	10
Alain Mikael Aprahamian (URU)	00
Askerbii Gerbekov (BRN)	00
Vedat Albayrak (TUR)	10

Round of 16
Matthias Casse (BEL)	10 (yellow card)
Attila Ungvári (HUN)	00
Takanori Nagase (JPN)	01 (yellow card)
Vedat Albayrak (TUR)	00 (yellow card)

Quarter-finals
Matthias Casse (BEL)	00 (yellow card)
Takanori Nagase (JPN)	01 (yellow card)

=== Pool B ===
First round

Round of 32
Guilherme Schimidt (BRA)	11
Edi Šerifovski (MKD)	00 (yellow card)
Antonio Esposito (ITA)	10 (yellow card)
Valentin Houinato (BEN)	00 (yellow card)
François Gauthier-Drapeau (CAN)	10
João Fernando (POR)	00
Nugzar Tatalashvili (UAE)	00
Adrián Gandía (PUR)	11 (yellow card)

Round of 16
Guilherme Schimidt (BRA)	00
Antonio Esposito (ITA)	01 (yellow card)
François Gauthier-Drapeau (CAN)	10
Adrián Gandía (PUR)	00 (yellow card)

Quarter-finals
Antonio Esposito (ITA)	10 (yellow card)
François Gauthier-Drapeau (CAN)	00

=== Pool C ===
First round

Round of 32
Tato Grigalashvili (GEO)	10 (yellow card)
Mihail Latișev (MDA)	00
Wachid Borchashvili (AUT)	11 (yellow card)
~~Mohammad Samim Faizad (AFG)~~ (Note: Mohammad Samim Faizad was retrospectively disqualified from the event on 3 August 2024.)	00 (yellow card)
Somon Makhmadbekov (TJK)	10
Fares Badawi (PLE)	00
Hugo Cumbo (VAN)	00
Frank de Wit (NED)	10

Round of 16
Tato Grigalashvili (GEO)	01
Wachid Borchashvili (AUT)	00
Somon Makhmadbekov (TJK)	01
Frank de Wit (NED)	00 (yellow card)

Quarter-finals
Tato Grigalashvili (GEO)	01 (yellow card)
Somon Makhmadbekov (TJK)	00 (yellow card)

=== Pool D ===
First round
Alpha Oumar Djalo (FRA)	01 (yellow card)
Abdelrahman Abdelghany (EGY)	00 (yellow card)

Round of 32
Lee Joon-hwan (KOR)	01 (yellow card)
Achraf Moutii (MAR)	00
Timo Cavelius (GER)	00 (yellow card)
Sagi Muki (ISR)	10 (yellow card)
Zelim Tckaev (AZE)	00
Alpha Oumar Djalo (FRA)	10 (yellow card)
Sharofiddin Boltaboev (UZB)	w/o
~~Sajjad Sehen (IRQ)~~	DQB

Round of 16
Lee Joon-hwan (KOR)	10 (yellow card)
Sagi Muki (ISR)	00
Alpha Oumar Djalo (FRA)	00 (yellow card)
Sharofiddin Boltaboev (UZB)	10

Quarter-finals
Lee Joon-hwan (KOR)	10
Sharofiddin Boltaboev (UZB)	00
