= Timur Arbuzov =

Russian judoka (born 2004)

Personal information
- Native name: Тимур Денисович Арбузов
- Full name: Timur Denisovich Arbuzov
- Born: 14 April 2004 (age 22) Kropotkin, Krasnodar Krai, Russia
- Occupation: Judoka
- Height: 180 cm (5 ft 11 in)

Sport
- Country: Russia
- Sport: Judo
- Weight class: ‍–‍81 kg
- Rank: Black belt
- Club: Tuapse sport school #1 (Tuapse); Rodina judo and sambo club (Yekaterinburg)
- Coached by: Dzhanbolet Naguchev

Achievements and titles
- World Champ.: (gold) (2025)
- European Champ.: (gold) (2025, 2026)
- Highest world ranking: 1^{st}
Medal record
Men's judo
Representing the IJF
World Championships
Gold medal – first place	2025 Budapest	‍–‍81 kg
European Championships
Gold medal – first place	2025 Podgorica	‍–‍81 kg
Bronze medal – third place	2025 Podgorica	Mixed team
IJF Grand Slam
Gold medal – first place	2025 Tashkent	‍–‍81 kg
Silver medal – second place	2024 Tokyo	‍–‍81 kg
Representing Individual Neutral Athletes
World Championships
Silver medal – second place	2024 Abu Dhabi	‍–‍81 kg
IJF Grand Slam
Gold medal – first place	2024 Tbilisi	‍–‍81 kg
Bronze medal – third place	2024 Paris	‍–‍81 kg
World Juniors Championships
Bronze medal – third place	2023 Odivelas	‍–‍81 kg
Representing Russia
European Championships
Gold medal – first place	2026 Tbilisi	‍–‍81 kg
Gold medal – first place	2026 Belgrade	Mixed team
IJF Grand Slam
Bronze medal – third place	2025 Tokyo	‍–‍81 kg
Bronze medal – third place	2026 Ulaanbaatar	‍–‍81 kg
European Cadet Championships
Gold medal – first place	2021 Riga	‍–‍66 kg
Men's sambo
Representing Russia
World Cadet Championships
Gold medal – first place	2018 Novi Sad	‍–‍46 kg

Profile at external databases
- IJF: 50421
- JudoInside.com: 134181
- Updated on 21 June 2026

Timur Denisovich Arbuzov (Russian: Тимур Денисович Арбузов, born 14 April 2004) is a Russian judoka and sambist who competes in the men's half-middleweight (81 kg) category. He was the 2025 World Judo Champion, the 2025 and 2026 European Champion, and the 2022 Russian nationals runner-up.

== Background ==
Arbuzov was born and raised in Kropotkin township based in Krasnodar Krai, Russia. He started judo and sambo at the age of four under his father Denis Arbuzov.

== Career ==
=== Cadet level ===
Arbuzov began competing as a sambo competitor in 2018, where he came in first place at the Russian and World Championships in Serbia. During the 2019 part of the season, Arbuzov won a bronze medal at the judo National Championships and the gold medal at the European Cup in Coimbra, Portugal. In 2021, he came first at the European Cadet Championships in Riga, Latvia and won the Cadet European Cup in Poreč, Croatia.

=== Junior level ===
In 2021, Arbuzov won the Russian Junior Championships at 73 kg. In 2023, he won a gold medal at the U23 Russian Championships and a bronze at the World Juniors Championships.

=== 2022 ===
Arbuzov earned his first senior silver medal at the Russian nationals held in Yekaterinburg.

=== 2024 ===
In February, Arbuzov placed third at the 2024 Paris Grand Slam. In March, Arbuzov finished in first place at the 2024 Tbilisi Grand Slam in the men's 81 kg. In May, he competed at the 2024 World Championships, where he reached the final in the men's 81 kg.

=== 2025 ===
In March, he won the 2025 Tashkent Grand Slam. In the final match, he beat Uzbekistan's Arslonbek Tojiev. In April, Timur won his first European title, where he beat in the final match Tato Grigalashvili of Georgia. In June, he took the gold medal at the world championships. In rematch, he over Tato Grigalashvili again.

=== 2026 ===
In April, he came first at the 2026 European Championships held in Tbilisi, Georgia.

== Achievements ==
- Judo
  - 2019 Russian Cadet Championships — 3rd.
  - 2019, 2021 European Cadet Cup — 1st.
  - 2021 European Cadet Championships — 1st.
  - 2021 Russian Junior Championships — 1st.
  - 2022 Russian Championships — 2nd.
  - 2023 U23 Russian Championships — 1st.
  - 2023 World Junior Championships — 3rd.
  - 2024 Grand Slam Paris — 3rd.
  - 2024 Grand Slam Tbilisi — 1st.
  - 2024 World Championships — 2nd.
  - 2025 Grand Slam Tashkent — 1st.
  - 2025 European Championships — 1st.
  - 2025 World Championships — 1st.
  - 2026 European Championships — 1st.
- Sambo
  - 2018 Russian Cadet Championships — 1st.
  - 2018 World Cadet Championships — 1st.

== Personal life ==
He lives and trains in Tuapse, Krasnodar Krai with his Olympian teammate Sofia Asvesta and younger brothers Eduard, Artiom and Matvey. Also, he trains in the Rodina judo and sambo club in Yekaterinburg, Sverdlovsk Oblast.
