= Ungvári =

Ungvári is a surname. Notable people with the surname include:

- Attila Ungvári (born 1988), Hungarian judoka
- Miklós Ungvári (born 1980), Hungarian judoka
