= 2025 World Judo Championships =

Judo competition

2025 Judo World Judo Championships
- Venue: László Papp Budapest Sports Arena
- Location: Budapest, Hungary
- Dates: 13–20 June 2025
- No. of events: 15 (7 men, 7 women, 1 mixed)
- Competitors: 556 from 93 nations
- Total prize money: €998,000

Competition at external databases
- Links: IJF • JudoInside

The 2025 World Judo Championships was the 38th edition of the men's and 29th edition of the women's World Judo Championships. It was held at the László Papp Sports Arena in Budapest, Hungary from 13 to 20 June 2025 as part of the IJF World Tour, which concluded with a mixed team event on its eighth and final day.

== Schedule ==
All times are local (UTC+2).

Day	Date	Weight classes		Preliminaries	Final Block
Day	Date	Men	Women	Preliminaries	Final Block
1	13 June	60 kg	48 kg	11:30	18:00
2	14 June	66 kg	52 kg	11:00	18:00
3	15 June	73 kg	57 kg	11:30	18:00
4	16 June	81 kg	63 kg	11:00	18:00
5	17 June	90 kg	70 kg	11:00	18:00
6	18 June	100 kg	78 kg	11:30	18:00
7	19 June	+100 kg	+78 kg	12:00	18:00
8	20 June	Mixed team		10:00	18:00

== Medal summary ==
=== Medal table ===
* Host nation (Hungary)

Rank	Nation	Gold	Silver	Bronze	Total
1	Japan (JPN)	6	4	5	15
2	International Judo Federation (IJF) (Note: Russian judokas participated under name and flag of the International Judo Federation (IJF) as a result of sanctions imposed following the 2022 invasion of Ukraine. Unlike 2023 and 2024 World Championships (at which Russian judokas participated as Individual Neutral Athletes), the IJF does include the medals won by these judokas in the official medal table.)	3	0	2	5
3	Georgia (GEO)	2	2	1	5
4	Italy (ITA)	2	0	0	2
5	South Korea (KOR)	1	1	3	5
6	France (FRA)	1	1	2	4
7	Germany (GER)	0	1	3	4
8	Tajikistan (TJK)	0	1	2	3
9	Brazil (BRA)	0	1	1	2
9	Kosovo (KOS)	0	1	1	2
11	Canada (CAN)	0	1	0	1
11	Croatia (CRO)	0	1	0	1
11	Kazakhstan (KAZ)	0	1	0	1
14	Azerbaijan (AZE)	0	0	3	3
15	Mongolia (MGL)	0	0	2	2
16	Hungary (HUN)*	0	0	1	1
16	Netherlands (NED)	0	0	1	1
16	Portugal (POR)	0	0	1	1
16	Spain (ESP)	0	0	1	1
16	United Arab Emirates (UAE)	0	0	1	1
Totals (20 entries)		15	15	30	60

=== Men's events ===
Event	Gold	Silver	Bronze
Extra-lightweight (−60 kg)	Ryuju Nagayama; Japan	Romain Valadier-Picard; France	Kazirbekiin Yolk; Mongolia
Extra-lightweight (−60 kg)	Ryuju Nagayama; Japan	Romain Valadier-Picard; France	Ayub Bliev; International Judo Federation
Half-lightweight (−66 kg)	Takeshi Takeoka; Japan	Nurali Emomali; Tajikistan	Hifumi Abe; Japan
Half-lightweight (−66 kg)	Takeshi Takeoka; Japan	Nurali Emomali; Tajikistan	Obid Dzhebov; Tajikistan
Lightweight (−73 kg)	Joan-Benjamin Gaba; France	Daniel Cargnin; Brazil	Makhmadbek Makhmadbekov; United Arab Emirates
Lightweight (−73 kg)	Joan-Benjamin Gaba; France	Daniel Cargnin; Brazil	Tatsuki Ishihara; Japan
Half-middleweight (−81 kg)	Timur Arbuzov; International Judo Federation	Tato Grigalashvili; Georgia	Zelim Tckaev; Azerbaijan
Half-middleweight (−81 kg)	Timur Arbuzov; International Judo Federation	Tato Grigalashvili; Georgia	Lee Joon-hwan; South Korea
Middleweight (−90 kg)	Sanshiro Murao; Japan	Goki Tajima; Japan	Eljan Hajiyev; Azerbaijan
Middleweight (−90 kg)	Sanshiro Murao; Japan	Goki Tajima; Japan	Luka Maisuradze; Georgia
Half-heavyweight (−100 kg)	Matvey Kanikovskiy; International Judo Federation	Dota Arai; Japan	Zelym Kotsoiev; Azerbaijan
Half-heavyweight (−100 kg)	Matvey Kanikovskiy; International Judo Federation	Dota Arai; Japan	Arman Adamian; International Judo Federation
Heavyweight (+100 kg)	Inal Tasoev; International Judo Federation	Guram Tushishvili; Georgia	Temur Rakhimov; Tajikistan
Heavyweight (+100 kg)	Inal Tasoev; International Judo Federation	Guram Tushishvili; Georgia	Kim Min-jong; South Korea

=== Women's events ===
Event	Gold	Silver	Bronze
Extra-lightweight (−48 kg)	Assunta Scutto; Italy	Abiba Abuzhakynova; Kazakhstan	Laura Martínez Abelenda; Spain
Extra-lightweight (−48 kg)	Assunta Scutto; Italy	Abiba Abuzhakynova; Kazakhstan	Wakana Koga; Japan
Half-lightweight (−52 kg)	Uta Abe; Japan	Distria Krasniqi; Kosovo	Róza Gyertyás; Hungary
Half-lightweight (−52 kg)	Uta Abe; Japan	Distria Krasniqi; Kosovo	Mascha Ballhaus; Germany
Lightweight (−57 kg)	Eteri Liparteliani; Georgia	Momo Tamaoki; Japan	Shirlen Nascimento; Brazil
Lightweight (−57 kg)	Eteri Liparteliani; Georgia	Momo Tamaoki; Japan	Sarah-Léonie Cysique; France
Half-middleweight (−63 kg)	Haruka Kaju; Japan	Catherine Beauchemin-Pinard; Canada	Boldyn Gankhaich; Mongolia
Half-middleweight (−63 kg)	Haruka Kaju; Japan	Catherine Beauchemin-Pinard; Canada	Laura Fazliu; Kosovo
Middleweight (−70 kg)	Shiho Tanaka; Japan	Lara Cvjetko; Croatia	Sanne van Dijke; Netherlands
Middleweight (−70 kg)	Shiho Tanaka; Japan	Lara Cvjetko; Croatia	Miriam Butkereit; Germany
Half-heavyweight (−78 kg)	Alice Bellandi; Italy	Anna Monta Olek; Germany	Kurena Ikeda; Japan
Half-heavyweight (−78 kg)	Alice Bellandi; Italy	Anna Monta Olek; Germany	Patrícia Sampaio; Portugal
Heavyweight (+78 kg)	Kim Ha-yun; South Korea	Mao Arai; Japan	Lee Hyeon-ji; South Korea
Heavyweight (+78 kg)	Kim Ha-yun; South Korea	Mao Arai; Japan	Romane Dicko; France

=== Mixed events ===
Event	Gold	Silver	Bronze
Mixed team	Georgia; Eter Askilashvili; Mikheili Bakhbakhashvili; Lasha Bekauri; Saba Inaneishvili; Eteri Liparteliani; Nino Loladze; Luka Maisuradze; Sophio Somkhishvili; Mariam Tchanturia; Guram Tushishvili	South Korea; Bae Dong-hyun; Huh Mi-mi; Kim Chann-yeong; Kim Ha-yun; Kim Jong-hoon; Kim Ju-hee; Kim Min-jong; Lee Hyeon-ji; Lee Joon-hwan; Lee Seung-yeob; Lee Ye-rang; Shin Chae-won	Germany; Erik Abramov; Mascha Ballhaus; Seija Ballhaus; Alina Böhm; Samira Bouizgarne; Miriam Butkereit; Timo Cavelius; Losseni Kone; Jano Rübo; Giovanna Scoccimarro; Eduard Trippel; Igor Wandtke
Mixed team	Georgia; Eter Askilashvili; Mikheili Bakhbakhashvili; Lasha Bekauri; Saba Inaneishvili; Eteri Liparteliani; Nino Loladze; Luka Maisuradze; Sophio Somkhishvili; Mariam Tchanturia; Guram Tushishvili	South Korea; Bae Dong-hyun; Huh Mi-mi; Kim Chann-yeong; Kim Ha-yun; Kim Jong-hoon; Kim Ju-hee; Kim Min-jong; Lee Hyeon-ji; Lee Joon-hwan; Lee Seung-yeob; Lee Ye-rang; Shin Chae-won	Japan; Mao Arai; Megumi Fuchida; Tatsuki Ishihara; Sanshiro Murao; Kanta Nakano; Hyōga Ōta; Goki Tajima; Ruri Takahashi; Momo Tamaoki; Shiho Tanaka; Yudai Tanaka; Utana Terada

== Prize money ==
The sums written are per medalist, bringing the total prizes awarded to €798,000 for the individual events and €200,000 for the team event. (retrieved from:)

Medal	Individual			Mixed team		
Medal	Total	Judoka	Coach	Total	Judoka	Coach
Gold	€26,000	€20,800	€5,200	€90,000	€72,000	€18,000
Silver	€15,000	€12,000	€3,000	€60,000	€48,000	€12,000
Bronze	€8,000	€6,400	€1,600	€25,000	€20,000	€5,000
