= Arab Sibghatullah =

Afghan judoka (born 2001)

Personal information
- Born: 4 July 2001 (age 25) Kunduz, Afghanistan
- Occupation: Judoka

Sport
- Sport: Judo
- Weight class: ‍–‍81 kg
- Team: Refugee Olympic Team (2024)

Achievements and titles
- Olympic Games: R32 (2024)
- World Champ.: R32 (2025, 2026)
- European Champ.: R32 (2023, 2023)

Profile at external databases
- IJF: 75114
- JudoInside.com: 161804
- Updated on 7 October 2026

Arab Sibghatullah (born 4 July 2001) is an Afghan judoka who competed with the Refugee Olympic Team at the 2024 Summer Olympics.

== Early life ==
Arab Sibghatullah was born in Kunduz, Afghanistan, on 4 July 2001. Encouraged by his brother, he started practicing judo at the age of eight in Kunduz, joining their national youth team at the age of nineteen.

In 2021, Sibghatullah was forced to flee the Taliban in Afghanistan. He travelled 6,000 kilometres (3,700 mi) mainly by foot through thirteen countries including Iran, Turkey, Greece, Bosnia, and Slovenia. He finally arrived in Germany in November 2022, where he was given asylum.

== Life in Germany ==
Upon arriving in Germany, Sibghatullah was placed in a refugee center in Kamen, where he learned of a judo club with a coach who could speak Persian.

Sibghatullah practices judo with the 1. Judo-Club in Mönchengladbach and at a training camp in Cologne. He placed seventh in the Madrid European Open on 10 June 2023.

=== Summer 2024 Olympics ===
On 2 May 2024, Sibghatullah was announced as a member of the Refugee Olympic Team for its participation in the 2024 Summer Olympics, particularly in the Men's 81 kg event. On 30 July, he was eliminated in the round of 32 in a match against Matthias Casse, which he lost with a score of 11–1.
