= Mihajlo Simin =

Serbian judoka (born 2005)

Personal information
- Born: 24 January 2005 (age 21) Novi Sad
- Occupation: Judoka

Sport
- Country: Serbia
- Sport: Judo
- Weight class: ‍–‍81 kg
- Club: Crvena Zvezda

Achievements and titles
- World Champ.: (bronze) (2026)
- European Champ.: (bronze) (2026)
Medal record
Men's judo
Representing Serbia
World Championships
| Bronze medal – third place | 2026 Baku | ‍–‍81 kg |
European Championships
| Bronze medal – third place | 2026 Tbilisi | ‍–‍81 kg |
IJF Grand Slam
| Silver medal – second place | 2026 Budapest | ‍–‍81 kg |
| Bronze medal – third place | 2026 Tbilisi | ‍–‍81 kg |
| Bronze medal – third place | 2026 Ulaanbaatar | ‍–‍81 kg |
IJF Grand Prix
| Gold medal – first place | 2025 Lima | ‍–‍81 kg |
| Bronze medal – third place | 2026 Linz | ‍–‍81 kg |
World Juniors Championships
| Bronze medal – third place | 2025 Lima | ‍–‍81 kg |
European Junior Championships
| Gold medal – first place | 2025 Bratislava | ‍–‍81 kg |
European Cadet Championships
| Silver medal – second place | 2022 Poreč | ‍–‍73 kg |
European Youth Olympic Festival
| Silver medal – second place | 2022 Banská Bystrica | ‍–‍73 kg |

Profile at external databases
- IJF: 59853
- JudoInside.com: 142748
- Updated on 7 October 2026

Mihajlo Simin (Serbian: Михајло Симин, born 24 January 2005) is a Serbian judoka. He is a World Judo Championships and European Judo Championships bronze medalist.

== Career ==
In September 2025, Simin competed at the 2025 European Junior Judo Championships and won a gold medal in the –81 kg category. On 7 October 2025, he competed at the 2025 World Judo Juniors Championships and won a bronze medal in the –81 kg category. On 12 October 2025, he competed at the 2025 Judo Grand Prix Lima and won a gold medal in the –81 kg category, his first career medal on the IJF World Tour.

In April 2026, he competed at the 2026 European Judo Championships and won a bronze medal in the –81 kg category. In June 2026, he competed at the 2026 Judo Grand Slam Ulaanbaatar and won a bronze medal in the –‍81 kg category.

In August 2026, he represented Serbia at the 2026 Mediterranean Games and was eliminated in the semifinals. The next month he competed at the 2026 Judo Grand Slam Budapest and won a silver medal in the –81 kg category. In October 2026, he competed at the 2026 World Judo Championships and won a bronze medal. In the semifinals, he lost to Georgia's Tato Grigalashvili. In the repechage, he defeated South Korea's Lee Joon-hwan to secure the bronze medal.
