= 2025 European Junior Judo Championships =

Judo competition

Judo 2025 European Junior Judo Championships
- Venue: Gopass Arena
- Location: Bratislava, Slovakia
- Dates: 4–7 September 2025
- Competitors: 364 from 43 nations

Champions
- Mixed team: France (3rd title)

Competition at external databases
- Links: IJF • JudoInside

The 2025 European Junior Judo Championships were held at the Gopass Arena in Bratislava, Slovakia, from 4 to 7 September 2025. The last day of competition featured a mixed team event.

== Medal summary ==
=== Men's events ===
Event	Gold	Silver	Bronze
Extra-lightweight (−60 kg)	Nihad Mamishov (AZE)	Francesco Sampino (ITA)	Zacharie Dijol (FRA)
Extra-lightweight (−60 kg)	Nihad Mamishov (AZE)	Francesco Sampino (ITA)	Kelvin Ray (FRA)
Half-lightweight (−66 kg)	Mahammad Musayev (AZE)	Alexis Renard (FRA)	Simas Polikevičius (LTU)
Half-lightweight (−66 kg)	Mahammad Musayev (AZE)	Alexis Renard (FRA)	Nizami Imranov (AZE)
Lightweight (−73 kg)	Irakli Goginashvili (GBR)	Narek Vardanian (SWE)	Peter Jean (FRA)
Lightweight (−73 kg)	Irakli Goginashvili (GBR)	Narek Vardanian (SWE)	Lucio Tavoletta (ITA)
Half-middleweight (−81 kg)	Mihajlo Simin (SRB)	Iñaki Baztán (ESP)	Akhmed Turluev (IJF)
Half-middleweight (−81 kg)	Mihajlo Simin (SRB)	Iñaki Baztán (ESP)	Szymon Szulik (POL)
Middleweight (−90 kg)	Cristiano Mincinesi (ITA)	Derek Marczak (POL)	Luka Javakhishvili (GEO)
Middleweight (−90 kg)	Cristiano Mincinesi (ITA)	Derek Marczak (POL)	Vadim Ghimbovschi (MDA)
Half-heavyweight (−100 kg)	Milan Bulaja (SRB)	Jakob Vares (EST)	Giorgi Bendeliani (GEO)
Half-heavyweight (−100 kg)	Milan Bulaja (SRB)	Jakob Vares (EST)	Nodari Alapishvili (GEO)
Heavyweight (+100 kg)	Bislan Katamardov (IJF)	Mortaza Suha (GER)	Mathéo Akiana Mongo (FRA)
Heavyweight (+100 kg)	Bislan Katamardov (IJF)	Mortaza Suha (GER)	Darius Dobre (ROU)

=== Women's events ===
Event	Gold	Silver	Bronze
Extra-lightweight (−48 kg)	Aitana Diaz Hernandez (ESP)	Helen Habib (GER)	Sofia Mazzola (ITA)
Extra-lightweight (−48 kg)	Aitana Diaz Hernandez (ESP)	Helen Habib (GER)	Anastasiia Barabash (IJF)
Half-lightweight (−52 kg)	Gaia Stella (ITA)	Ilaria Finestrone (ITA)	Réka Szabó (HUN)
Half-lightweight (−52 kg)	Gaia Stella (ITA)	Ilaria Finestrone (ITA)	Bojana Savić (SRB)
Lightweight (−57 kg)	Michela Terranova (ITA)	Emma Melis (FRA)	Hili Zakroisky (ISR)
Lightweight (−57 kg)	Michela Terranova (ITA)	Emma Melis (FRA)	Elvida Gureva (IJF)
Half-middleweight (−63 kg)	Savita Russo (ITA)	Sara-Joy Bauer (GER)	Doria Boursas (FRA)
Half-middleweight (−63 kg)	Savita Russo (ITA)	Sara-Joy Bauer (GER)	Kerem Primo (ISR)
Middleweight (−70 kg)	Ecem Baysuğ (TUR)	April Lynn Fohouo (SUI)	Eva Ognivova (IJF)
Middleweight (−70 kg)	Ecem Baysuğ (TUR)	April Lynn Fohouo (SUI)	Serena Ondei (ITA)
Half-heavyweight (−78 kg)	Lila Mazzarino (FRA)	Linde Hanstede (NED)	Marie Žofie Košnarová (CZE)
Half-heavyweight (−78 kg)	Lila Mazzarino (FRA)	Linde Hanstede (NED)	Zuzanna Banaszewska (POL)
Heavyweight (+78 kg)	Célia Cancan (FRA)	Léonie Minkada-Caquineau (FRA)	Emma-Melis Aktas (EST)
Heavyweight (+78 kg)	Célia Cancan (FRA)	Léonie Minkada-Caquineau (FRA)	Yuli Alma Mishiner (ISR)

=== Mixed ===
Event	Gold	Silver	Bronze
Mixed team	France	Turkey	Switzerland
Mixed team	France	Turkey	Germany

=== Medal table ===
* Host nation (Slovakia)

Rank	Nation	Gold	Silver	Bronze	Total
1	Italy (ITA)	4	2	3	9
2	France (FRA)	3	3	5	11
3	Azerbaijan (AZE)	2	0	1	3
3	Serbia (SRB)	2	0	1	3
5	Spain (ESP)	1	1	0	2
5	Turkey (TUR)	1	1	0	2
7	International Judo Federation (IJF)	1	0	4	5
8	Great Britain (GBR)	1	0	0	1
9	Germany (GER)	0	3	1	4
10	Poland (POL)	0	1	2	3
11	Estonia (EST)	0	1	1	2
11	Switzerland (SUI)	0	1	1	2
13	Netherlands (NED)	0	1	0	1
13	Sweden (SWE)	0	1	0	1
15	Georgia (GEO)	0	0	3	3
15	Israel (ISR)	0	0	3	3
17	Czech Republic (CZE)	0	0	1	1
17	Hungary (HUN)	0	0	1	1
17	Lithuania (LTU)	0	0	1	1
17	Moldova (MDA)	0	0	1	1
17	Romania (ROU)	0	0	1	1
Totals (21 entries)		15	15	30	60
