= Shirlen Nascimento =

Brazilian judoka (born 2000)

Personal information
- Full name: Shirlen Thais do Nascimento
- Born: 20 March 2000 (age 26) Toledo, Paraná
- Occupation: Judoka

Sport
- Country: Brazil
- Sport: Judo
- Weight class: ‍–‍57 kg

Achievements and titles
- World Champ.: (bronze) (2025)
- Pan American Champ.: (gold) (2025, 2026)
Medal record
Women's judo
Representing Brazil
World Championships
Bronze medal – third place	2025 Budapest	‍–‍57 kg
Pan American Championships
Gold medal – first place	2025 Santiago	‍–‍57 kg
Gold medal – first place	2026 Panama City	‍–‍57 kg
IJF Grand Slam
Silver medal – second place	2026 Abu Dhabi	‍–‍57 kg
Bronze medal – third place	2024 Abu Dhabi	‍–‍57 kg
Bronze medal – third place	2025 Astana	‍–‍57 kg
IJF Grand Prix
Gold medal – first place	2026 Zagreb	‍–‍57 kg
Bronze medal – third place	2025 Lima	‍–‍57 kg
Bronze medal – third place	2025 Guadalajara	‍–‍57 kg

Profile at external databases
- IJF: 54786
- JudoInside.com: 140080
- Updated on 15 November 2026

Shirlen Thais do Nascimento (born 20 March 2000 in Toledo, Paraná) is a Brazilian judoka.

== Career ==
She was Rafaela Silva's sparring partner at the 2024 Summer Olympics, helping the Olympic champion with her training. As Rafaela moved up a weight class, Shirlen took her place in the category.

At 2024 Judo Grand Slam Abu Dhabi, she won the bronze medal.

Nascimento won a gold medal at the 2025 Pan American-Oceania Championships, in the ‍–‍57 kg category.

At 2025 Judo Grand Slam Astana, she won the bronze medal.

At the 2025 World Judo Championships, in her World Championship debut, defeated South Korean Huh Mi-mi, Olympic runner-up and world champion, and reached the quarterfinals, losing only to Japanese Momo Tamaoki. She subsequently won both of her repechage matches to obtain the bronze medal.
