= Omar Rajabli =

Azerbaijani judoka (born 2003)

Personal information
- Native name: Ömər Elxan oğlu Rəcəbli
- Born: 22 November 2003 (age 22)
- Occupation: Judoka

Sport
- Country: Azerbaijan
- Sport: Judo
- Weight class: ‍–‍81 kg

Achievements and titles
- World Champ.: (bronze) (2026)
- European Champ.: R16 (2025, 2026)
Medal record
Men's judo
Representing Azerbaijan
World Championships
Bronze medal – third place	2026 Baku	‍–‍81 kg
IJF Grand Slam
Gold medal – first place	2026 Tashkent	‍–‍81 kg
Silver medal – second place	2024 Baku	‍–‍81 kg
Bronze medal – third place	2025 Paris	‍–‍81 kg
Bronze medal – third place	2026 Lausanne	‍–‍81 kg
IJF Grand Prix
Bronze medal – third place	2025 Lima	‍–‍81 kg
Bronze medal – third place	2026 Linz	‍–‍81 kg
European U23 Championships
Silver medal – second place	2025 Chișinău	‍–‍81 kg
Bronze medal – third place	2024 Piła	‍–‍81 kg
European Junior Championships
Bronze medal – third place	2023 The Hague	‍–‍81 kg

Profile at external databases
- IJF: 60560
- JudoInside.com: 146906
- Updated on 8 October 2026

Omar Rajabli (Azerbaijani: Ömər Elxan oğlu Rəcəbli, born 22 November 2003) is an Azerbaijani judoka.

== Career ==
In February 2024, Rajabli competed at the 2024 Judo Grand Slam Baku and won a silver medal in the –81 kg category, his first career Judo Grand Slam medal. In November 2024, he competed at the 2024 European U23 Judo Championships won a bronze medal in the –81 kg category.

In February 2025, he competed at the 2025 Judo Grand Slam Paris and won a bronze medal in the –81 kg category. In April 2025, he competed at the 2025 European Judo Championships in the –81 kg category and was eliminated in the round of 16. In October 2025, he competed at the 2025 Judo Grand Prix Lima and won a bronze medal in the –81 kg category, his first career medal Grand Prix medal.

In February 2026, he competed at the 2026 Judo Grand Slam Tashkent and won his first career Judo Grand Slam gold medal in the –81 kg category. The next month he competed competed at the 2026 Judo Grand Prix Linz and won a bronze medal in the –81 kg category.

In August 2026, he competed at the 2026 Judo Grand Slam Lausanne and won a bronze medal in the –81 kg category. In October 2026, he competed at the 2026 World Judo Championships and won a bronze medal in the –81 kg category, defeating Abylaikhan Zhubanazar.

== Personal life ==
Rajabli's father, Elkhan Rajabli, is a former judoka who won a bronze medal at the 2001 World Judo Championships.
