= Mohammad Samim Faizad =

Afghan judoka (born 2002)

Personal information
- Born: 7 August 2002 (age 23) Kabul, Afghanistan
- Occupation: Judoka

Sport
- Country: Afghanistan
- Sport: Judo
- Weight class: ‍–‍81 kg
- Coached by: Ajmal Faizzada

Achievements and titles
- Olympic Games: R32 (2024)
- Asian Champ.: R32 (2024)

Profile at external databases
- IJF: 45129
- JudoInside.com: 106567
- Updated on 30 July 2024

Mohammad Samim Faizad (or Faizada; born 7 August 2002) is an Afghan judoka who competed at the 2024 Summer Olympics in Paris, France, in the men's 81 kg category.

== Biography ==
Mohammad Samim Faizad was born in Kabul, Afghanistan, on 7 August 2002. Besides judo, he also trains in wrestling. Faizad started training in judo around 2010 and trains at a gym in Kabul that is owned by the Afghanistan Judo Federation. He is coached by his uncle, Ajmal Faizzada, who competed for Afghanistan in the 2012 Summer Olympics.

Faizad competed only in two international competitions before going to the Olympics. Those were the 2018 Asian Judo Cadet Cup in Tashkent, where he lost in his first match to Jaykhunbek Nazarov of Uzbekistan, and the 2024 Asian Judo Championships in Hong Kong, where he lost in the first round to Sailike Songhaer of China. Overall he ranked 446th in the IJF world rankings for his weight class as of June 2024.

Faizad was chosen by the Afghan National Olympic Committee after winning a tournament in Kabul that involved over one hundred athletes to receive a universality quota spot from the IOC. He is the only athlete representing Afghanistan at the 2024 Olympics who continues to live and train in the country since the Taliban takeover in 2021.

On 30 July 2024, at the Paris Olympics, he lost in his first match to Wachid Borchashvili of Austria, who scored an ippon by seoi nage. However, on 3 August 2024, Faizad was disqualified from the tournament after receiving a provision suspension due a doping violation. He was later issued with a four-year ban to end in August 2028.
