= 2025 Judo Grand Prix Lima =

Judo Competition

Judo 2025 Judo Grand Prix Lima
- Venue: Coliseo Eduardo Dibos
- Location: Lima, Peru
- Dates: 11–13 October 2025
- Competitors: 284 from 48 nations
- Total prize money: €98,000

Competition at external databases
- Links: IJF • JudoInside

The 2025 Judo Grand Prix Lima was held at the Coliseo Eduardo Dibós arena in Lima, Peru from 11 to 13 October 2025 as part of the IJF World Tour.

== Medal summary ==
=== Men's events ===
Event	Gold	Silver	Bronze
Extra-lightweight (−60 kg)	Izhak Ashpiz (ISR)	Ahmad Yusifov (AZE)	Jonathan Benavides (ECU)
Extra-lightweight (−60 kg)	Izhak Ashpiz (ISR)	Ahmad Yusifov (AZE)	Jorre Verstraeten (BEL)
Half-lightweight (−66 kg)	Valerio Accogli (ITA)	Julien Frascadore (CAN)	Rashad Yelkiyev (AZE)
Half-lightweight (−66 kg)	Valerio Accogli (ITA)	Julien Frascadore (CAN)	Ruslan Pashayev (AZE)
Lightweight (−73 kg)	Daniel Cargnin (BRA)	Dayyan Boulemtafes (FRA)	Chusniddin Karimov (CZE)
Lightweight (−73 kg)	Daniel Cargnin (BRA)	Dayyan Boulemtafes (FRA)	Nils Stump (SUI)
Half-middleweight (−81 kg)	Mihajlo Simin (SRB)	Johan Silot (USA)	Gabriel Falcão (BRA)
Half-middleweight (−81 kg)	Mihajlo Simin (SRB)	Johan Silot (USA)	Omar Rajabli (AZE)
Middleweight (−90 kg)	Rafael Macedo (BRA)	Murad Fatiyev (AZE)	Adam Kopecký (CZE)
Middleweight (−90 kg)	Rafael Macedo (BRA)	Murad Fatiyev (AZE)	Tiziano Falcone (ITA)
Half-heavyweight (−100 kg)	Giovani Ferreira (BRA)	Leonardo Gonçalves (BRA)	Daniel Eich (SUI)
Half-heavyweight (−100 kg)	Giovani Ferreira (BRA)	Leonardo Gonçalves (BRA)	Aurélien Diesse (FRA)
Heavyweight (+100 kg)	Lukáš Krpálek (CZE)	Rafael Buzacarini (BRA)	Yevheniy Balyevskyy (UKR)
Heavyweight (+100 kg)	Lukáš Krpálek (CZE)	Rafael Buzacarini (BRA)	Kanan Nasibov (AZE)

=== Women's events ===
Event	Gold	Silver	Bronze
Extra-lightweight (−48 kg)	Mary Dee Vargas (CHI)	Coralie Gilly (FRA)	Konul Aliyeva (AZE)
Extra-lightweight (−48 kg)	Mary Dee Vargas (CHI)	Coralie Gilly (FRA)	Tamar Malca (ISR)
Half-lightweight (−52 kg)	Jéssica Pereira (BRA)	Gabriela Conceição (BRA)	Brillith Gamarra (PER)
Half-lightweight (−52 kg)	Jéssica Pereira (BRA)	Gabriela Conceição (BRA)	Alicia Marques (FRA)
Lightweight (−57 kg)	Faïza Mokdar (FRA)	Amandine Buchard (FRA)	Jéssica Lima (BRA)
Lightweight (−57 kg)	Faïza Mokdar (FRA)	Amandine Buchard (FRA)	Shirlen Nascimento (BRA)
Half-middleweight (−63 kg)	Jessica Klimkait (CAN)	Nauana Silva (BRA)	Kaja Kajzer (SLO)
Half-middleweight (−63 kg)	Jessica Klimkait (CAN)	Nauana Silva (BRA)	Friederike Stolze (GER)
Middleweight (−70 kg)	Ida Eriksson (SWE)	Giorgia Stangherlin (ITA)	Samira Bock (GER)
Middleweight (−70 kg)	Ida Eriksson (SWE)	Giorgia Stangherlin (ITA)	Irene Pedrotti (ITA)
Half-heavyweight (−78 kg)	Metka Lobnik (SLO)	Kaïla Issoufi (FRA)	Coralie Godbout (CAN)
Half-heavyweight (−78 kg)	Metka Lobnik (SLO)	Kaïla Issoufi (FRA)	Brenda Olaya (COL)
Heavyweight (+78 kg)	Raz Hershko (ISR)	Emma-Melis Aktas (EST)	Yuli Alma Mishiner (ISR)
Heavyweight (+78 kg)	Raz Hershko (ISR)	Emma-Melis Aktas (EST)	Grace-Esther Mienandi Lahou (FRA)

=== Medal table ===
* Host nation (Peru)

Rank	Nation	Gold	Silver	Bronze	Total
1	Brazil (BRA)	4	4	3	11
2	Israel (ISR)	2	0	2	4
3	France (FRA)	1	4	3	8
4	Italy (ITA)	1	1	2	4
5	Canada (CAN)	1	1	1	3
6	Czech Republic (CZE)	1	0	2	3
7	Slovenia (SLO)	1	0	1	2
8	Chile (CHI)	1	0	0	1
8	Serbia (SRB)	1	0	0	1
8	Sweden (SWE)	1	0	0	1
11	Azerbaijan (AZE)	0	2	5	7
12	Estonia (EST)	0	1	0	1
12	United States (USA)	0	1	0	1
14	Germany (GER)	0	0	2	2
14	Switzerland (SUI)	0	0	2	2
16	Belgium (BEL)	0	0	1	1
16	Colombia (COL)	0	0	1	1
16	Ecuador (ECU)	0	0	1	1
16	Peru (PER)*	0	0	1	1
16	Ukraine (UKR)	0	0	1	1
Totals (20 entries)		14	14	28	56

== Prize money ==
The sums written are per medalist, bringing the total prizes awarded to €98,000. (retrieved from:)

Medal	Total	Judoka	Coach
Gold	€3,000	€2,400	€600
Silver	€2,000	€1,600	€400
Bronze	€1,000	€800	€200
