= 2025 Judo Grand Slam Astana =

Judo competition

Judo 2025 Judo Grand Slam Astana
- Venue: Zhaksylyk Ushkempirov Martial Arts Palace
- Location: Astana, Kazakhstan
- Dates: 9–11 May 2025
- Competitors: 358 from 45 nations
- Total prize money: €154,000

Competition at external databases
- Links: IJF • JudoInside

The 2025 Judo Grand Slam Astana is a Judo Grand Slam tournament that was held at the Zhaksylyk Ushkempirov Martial Arts Palace in the city of Astana, Kazakhstan from 9 to 11 May 2025 as part of the IJF World Tour.

== Medal summary ==
=== Men's events ===
Event	Gold	Silver	Bronze
Extra-lightweight (−60 kg)	Iznaur Saaev (IJF)	Talgat Orynbassar (KAZ)	Magzhan Shamshadin (KAZ)
Extra-lightweight (−60 kg)	Iznaur Saaev (IJF)	Talgat Orynbassar (KAZ)	Aman Bakytzhan (KAZ)
Half-lightweight (−66 kg)	Ramazan Abdulaev (IJF)	Gusman Kyrgyzbayev (KAZ)	Jantsandorj Unurbat (MGL)
Half-lightweight (−66 kg)	Ramazan Abdulaev (IJF)	Gusman Kyrgyzbayev (KAZ)	Mukhriddin Tilovov (UZB)
Lightweight (−73 kg)	Nils Stump (SUI)	Kazbek Naguchev (UAE)	Lavjargalyn Ankhzayaa (MGL)
Lightweight (−73 kg)	Nils Stump (SUI)	Kazbek Naguchev (UAE)	Yeset Kuanov (KAZ)
Half-middleweight (−81 kg)	Lee Joon-hwan (KOR)	Takanori Nagase (JPN)	Zaur Dvalashvili (GEO)
Half-middleweight (−81 kg)	Lee Joon-hwan (KOR)	Takanori Nagase (JPN)	Abylaikhan Zhubanazar (KAZ)
Middleweight (−90 kg)	Mikhail Igolnikov (IJF)	Egor Malkin (IJF)	Adam Kopecký (CZE)
Middleweight (−90 kg)	Mikhail Igolnikov (IJF)	Egor Malkin (IJF)	Theodoros Tselidis (GRE)
Half-heavyweight (−100 kg)	Dota Arai (JPN)	Daniel Eich (SUI)	Marat Baikamurov (KAZ)
Half-heavyweight (−100 kg)	Dota Arai (JPN)	Daniel Eich (SUI)	Bakzhan Baitas (KAZ)
Heavyweight (+100 kg)	Hyōga Ōta (JPN)	Yerassyl Kazhibayev (KAZ)	Grzegorz Teresiński (POL)
Heavyweight (+100 kg)	Hyōga Ōta (JPN)	Yerassyl Kazhibayev (KAZ)	Saba Inaneishvili (GEO)

=== Women's events ===
Event	Gold	Silver	Bronze
Extra-lightweight (−48 kg)	Hui Xinran (CHN)	Sabina Giliazova (IJF)	Natasha Ferreira (BRA)
Extra-lightweight (−48 kg)	Hui Xinran (CHN)	Sabina Giliazova (IJF)	Assunta Scutto (ITA)
Half-lightweight (−52 kg)	Mascha Ballhaus (GER)	Ayumi Leiva Sánchez (ESP)	Astride Gneto (FRA)
Half-lightweight (−52 kg)	Mascha Ballhaus (GER)	Ayumi Leiva Sánchez (ESP)	Jéssica Pereira (BRA)
Lightweight (−57 kg)	Faïza Mokdar (FRA)	Momo Tamaoki (JPN)	Shirlen Nascimento (BRA)
Lightweight (−57 kg)	Faïza Mokdar (FRA)	Momo Tamaoki (JPN)	Pauline Starke (GER)
Half-middleweight (−63 kg)	Melkia Auchecorne (FRA)	Narumi Tanioka (JPN)	Rafaela Silva (BRA)
Half-middleweight (−63 kg)	Melkia Auchecorne (FRA)	Narumi Tanioka (JPN)	Lkhagvatogoogiin Enkhriilen (MGL)
Middleweight (−70 kg)	Giorgia Stangherlin (ITA)	Feng Yingying (CHN)	Dena Pohl (GER)
Middleweight (−70 kg)	Giorgia Stangherlin (ITA)	Feng Yingying (CHN)	Luana Carvalho (BRA)
Half-heavyweight (−78 kg)	Kim Min-ju (KOR)	Mao Izumi (JPN)	Julie Hölterhoff (GER)
Half-heavyweight (−78 kg)	Kim Min-ju (KOR)	Mao Izumi (JPN)	Beatriz Freitas (BRA)
Heavyweight (+78 kg)	Lee Hyeon-ji (KOR)	Julia Tolofua (FRA)	Ruri Takahashi (JPN)
Heavyweight (+78 kg)	Lee Hyeon-ji (KOR)	Julia Tolofua (FRA)	Niu Xinran (CHN)

=== Medal table ===
* Host nation (Kazakhstan)

Rank	Nation	Gold	Silver	Bronze	Total
1	International Judo Federation (IJF)	3	2	0	5
2	South Korea (KOR)	3	0	0	3
3	Japan (JPN)	2	4	1	7
4	France (FRA)	2	1	1	4
5	China (CHN)	1	1	1	3
6	Switzerland (SUI)	1	1	0	2
7	Germany (GER)	1	0	3	4
8	Italy (ITA)	1	0	1	2
9	Kazakhstan (KAZ)*	0	3	6	9
10	Spain (ESP)	0	1	0	1
10	United Arab Emirates (UAE)	0	1	0	1
12	Brazil (BRA)	0	0	6	6
13	Mongolia (MGL)	0	0	3	3
14	Georgia (GEO)	0	0	2	2
15	Czech Republic (CZE)	0	0	1	1
15	Greece (GRE)	0	0	1	1
15	Poland (POL)	0	0	1	1
15	Uzbekistan (UZB)	0	0	1	1
Totals (18 entries)		14	14	28	56

== Prize money ==
The sums written are per medalist, bringing the total prizes awarded to €154,000. (retrieved from:)

Medal	Total	Judoka	Coach
Gold	€5,000	€4,000	€1,000
Silver	€3,000	€2,400	€600
Bronze	€1,500	€1,200	€300
