= Dorin Gotonoaga =

Moldovan judoka

Personal information
- Born: 9 September 1995 (age 30)
- Occupation: Judoka
- Height: 168 cm (5 ft 6 in)

Sport
- Country: Moldova
- Sport: Judo
- Weight class: ‍–‍81 kg, ‍–‍90 kg
- Club: JC Leipzig
- Coached by: Ilie Buiuc

Achievements and titles
- World Champ.: R32 (2017, 2021, 2023)
- European Champ.: R16 (2025)
Medal record
Men's judo
Representing Moldova
IJF Grand Prix
Bronze medal – third place	2017 Düsseldorf	‍–‍81 kg
Bronze medal – third place	2018 Antalya	‍–‍81 kg
Bronze medal – third place	2021 Zagreb	‍–‍81 kg
European U23 Championships
Gold medal – first place	2017 Podgorica	‍–‍81 kg
European Junior Championships
Bronze medal – third place	2015 Oberwart	‍–‍81 kg
Summer Universiade
Bronze medal – third place	2019 Naples	‍–‍81 kg

Profile at external databases
- IJF: 7882
- JudoInside.com: 78580
- Updated on 27 April 2024

Dorin Gotonoaga (born 9 September 1995) is a Moldovan judoka. He is the bronze medallist in the -81 kg at the 2021 Judo Grand Prix Zagreb.
