= 2026 Judo Grand Prix Linz =

Judo competition

Judo 2026 Judo Grand Prix Linz
- Venue: TipsArena Linz
- Location: Linz, Austria
- Dates: 6–8 March 2026
- Competitors: 479 from 59 nations
- Total prize money: €98,000

Competition at external databases
- Links: IJF • JudoInside

The 2026 Judo Grand Prix Linz was held at the TipsArena Linz in Linz, Austria, from 6 to 8 March 2026 as part of the IJF World Tour.

== Medal summary ==
=== Men's events ===
Event	Gold	Silver	Bronze
Extra-lightweight (−60 kg)	Romain Valadier-Picard (FRA)	Dilshot Khalmatov (UKR)	Sherzod Davlatov (KAZ)
Extra-lightweight (−60 kg)	Romain Valadier-Picard (FRA)	Dilshot Khalmatov (UKR)	Sei Sato (JPN)
Half-lightweight (−66 kg)	Ruslan Pashayev (AZE)	Ronald Lima (BRA)	Adrián Nieto (ESP)
Half-lightweight (−66 kg)	Ruslan Pashayev (AZE)	Ronald Lima (BRA)	David García Torné (ESP)
Lightweight (−73 kg)	Ethan Nairne (GBR)	Bilal Çiloğlu (TUR)	Daniel Cargnin (BRA)
Lightweight (−73 kg)	Ethan Nairne (GBR)	Bilal Çiloğlu (TUR)	Jack Yonezuka (USA)
Half-middleweight (−81 kg)	Adilet Almat (KAZ)	Vusal Galandarzade (AZE)	Omar Rajabli (AZE)
Half-middleweight (−81 kg)	Adilet Almat (KAZ)	Vusal Galandarzade (AZE)	Mihajlo Simin (SRB)
Middleweight (−90 kg)	Tato Grigalashvili (GEO)	Luka Javakhishvili (GEO)	Maxime-Gaël Ngayap Hambou (FRA)
Middleweight (−90 kg)	Tato Grigalashvili (GEO)	Luka Javakhishvili (GEO)	Shunta Nakamura (JPN)
Half-heavyweight (−100 kg)	Anton Savytskiy (UKR)	Kou Nakayama (JPN)	Jorge Fonseca (POR)
Half-heavyweight (−100 kg)	Anton Savytskiy (UKR)	Kou Nakayama (JPN)	Giovani Ferreira (BRA)
Heavyweight (+100 kg)	İbrahim Tataroğlu (TUR)	Jur Spijkers (NED)	Gai Hatakeyama (JPN)
Heavyweight (+100 kg)	İbrahim Tataroğlu (TUR)	Jur Spijkers (NED)	Dzhamal Gamzatkhanov (AZE)

=== Women's events ===
Event	Gold	Silver	Bronze
Extra-lightweight (−48 kg)	Mitsuki Kondo (JPN)	Eva Pérez Soler (ESP)	Amber Gersjes (NED)
Extra-lightweight (−48 kg)	Mitsuki Kondo (JPN)	Eva Pérez Soler (ESP)	Laura Martínez (ESP)
Half-lightweight (−52 kg)	Iroha Oi (JPN)	Róza Gyertyás (HUN)	Gabriela Conceição (BRA)
Half-lightweight (−52 kg)	Iroha Oi (JPN)	Róza Gyertyás (HUN)	Ayumi Leiva Sánchez (ESP)
Lightweight (−57 kg)	Ayami Takano (JPN)	Moa Ono (JPN)	Martha Fawaz (FRA)
Lightweight (−57 kg)	Ayami Takano (JPN)	Moa Ono (JPN)	Marta García (ESP)
Half-middleweight (−63 kg)	Rafaela Silva (BRA)	Laura Fazliu (KOS)	Kerem Primo (ISR)
Half-middleweight (−63 kg)	Rafaela Silva (BRA)	Laura Fazliu (KOS)	Gili Sharir (ISR)
Middleweight (−70 kg)	Michaela Polleres (AUT)	April Lynn Fohouo (SUI)	Taís Pina (POR)
Middleweight (−70 kg)	Michaela Polleres (AUT)	April Lynn Fohouo (SUI)	Dena Pohl (GER)
Half-heavyweight (−78 kg)	Marie Branser (GUI)	Lieke Derks (NED)	Metka Lobnik (SLO)
Half-heavyweight (−78 kg)	Marie Branser (GUI)	Lieke Derks (NED)	Yuliia Kurchenko (UKR)
Heavyweight (+78 kg)	Raz Hershko (ISR)	Giovanna Santos (BRA)	Yuli Alma Mishiner (ISR)
Heavyweight (+78 kg)	Raz Hershko (ISR)	Giovanna Santos (BRA)	Emma-Melis Aktas (EST)

=== Medal table ===
* Host nation (Austria)

Rank	Nation	Gold	Silver	Bronze	Total
1	Japan (JPN)	3	2	3	8
2	Brazil (BRA)	1	2	3	6
3	Azerbaijan (AZE)	1	1	2	4
4	Ukraine (UKR)	1	1	1	3
5	Georgia (GEO)	1	1	0	2
5	Turkey (TUR)	1	1	0	2
7	Israel (ISR)	1	0	3	4
8	France (FRA)	1	0	2	3
9	Kazakhstan (KAZ)	1	0	1	2
10	Austria (AUT)*	1	0	0	1
10	Great Britain (GBR)	1	0	0	1
10	Guinea (GUI)	1	0	0	1
13	Netherlands (NED)	0	2	1	3
14	Spain (ESP)	0	1	5	6
15	Hungary (HUN)	0	1	0	1
15	Kosovo (KOS)	0	1	0	1
15	Switzerland (SUI)	0	1	0	1
18	Portugal (POR)	0	0	2	2
19	Estonia (EST)	0	0	1	1
19	Germany (GER)	0	0	1	1
19	Serbia (SRB)	0	0	1	1
19	Slovenia (SLO)	0	0	1	1
19	United States (USA)	0	0	1	1
Totals (23 entries)		14	14	28	56

== Prize money ==
The sums written are per medalist, bringing the total prizes awarded to €98,000. (retrieved from:)

Medal	Total	Judoka	Coach
Gold	€3,000	€2,400	€600
Silver	€2,000	€1,600	€400
Bronze	€1,000	€800	€200
