= 2024 Judo Grand Slam Paris =

Judo competition

Judo 2024 Judo Grand Slam Paris
- Venue: Accor Arena
- Location: Paris, France
- Dates: 2–4 February 2024
- Competitors: 621 from 107 nations
- Total prize money: €154,000

Competition at external databases
- Links: IJF • EJU • JudoInside

The 2024 Judo Grand Slam Paris was held at the Accor Arena in Paris, France, from 2 to 4 February 2024 as part of the IJF World Tour and during the 2024 Summer Olympics qualification period.

== Medal summary ==
=== Men's events ===
Event	Gold	Silver	Bronze
Extra-lightweight (−60 kg)	Luka Mkheidze (FRA)	Lee Ha-rim (KOR)	Francisco Garrigós (ESP)
Extra-lightweight (−60 kg)	Luka Mkheidze (FRA)	Lee Ha-rim (KOR)	Taiki Nakamura (JPN)
Half-lightweight (−66 kg)	Takeshi Takeoka (JPN)	Joshiro Maruyama (JPN)	David García Torné (ESP)
Half-lightweight (−66 kg)	Takeshi Takeoka (JPN)	Joshiro Maruyama (JPN)	Bayanmönkhiin Narmandakh (UAE)
Lightweight (−73 kg)	Tatsuki Ishihara (JPN)	Giorgi Chikhelidze (GEO)	Shakhram Ahadov (UZB)
Lightweight (−73 kg)	Tatsuki Ishihara (JPN)	Giorgi Chikhelidze (GEO)	Akil Gjakova (KOS)
Half-middleweight (−81 kg)	Matthias Casse (BEL)	Zelim Tckaev (AZE)	Timur Arbuzov (AIN)
Half-middleweight (−81 kg)	Matthias Casse (BEL)	Zelim Tckaev (AZE)	François Gauthier-Drapeau (CAN)
Middleweight (−90 kg)	Mihael Žgank (TUR)	Eljan Hajiyev (AZE)	Maxime-Gaël Ngayap Hambou (FRA)
Middleweight (−90 kg)	Mihael Žgank (TUR)	Eljan Hajiyev (AZE)	Erlan Sherov (KGZ)
Half-heavyweight (−100 kg)	Aaron Wolf (JPN)	Nikoloz Sherazadishvili (ESP)	Aleksandar Kukolj (SRB)
Half-heavyweight (−100 kg)	Aaron Wolf (JPN)	Nikoloz Sherazadishvili (ESP)	Nurlykhan Sharkhan (KAZ)
Heavyweight (+100 kg)	Teddy Riner (FRA)	Kim Min-jong (KOR)	Kanta Nakano (JPN)
Heavyweight (+100 kg)	Teddy Riner (FRA)	Kim Min-jong (KOR)	Alisher Yusupov (UZB)

Source results:

=== Women's events ===
Event	Gold	Silver	Bronze
Extra-lightweight (−48 kg)	Shirine Boukli (FRA)	Wakana Koga (JPN)	Laura Martínez (ESP)
Extra-lightweight (−48 kg)	Shirine Boukli (FRA)	Wakana Koga (JPN)	Assunta Scutto (ITA)
Half-lightweight (−52 kg)	Distria Krasniqi (KOS)	Chelsie Giles (GBR)	Kisumi Omori (JPN)
Half-lightweight (−52 kg)	Distria Krasniqi (KOS)	Chelsie Giles (GBR)	Ariane Toro (ESP)
Lightweight (−57 kg)	Faïza Mokdar (FRA)	Christa Deguchi (CAN)	Jessica Klimkait (CAN)
Lightweight (−57 kg)	Faïza Mokdar (FRA)	Christa Deguchi (CAN)	Sarah-Léonie Cysique (FRA)
Half-middleweight (−63 kg)	Clarisse Agbegnenou (FRA)	Katarina Krišto (CRO)	Boldyn Gankhaich (MGL)
Half-middleweight (−63 kg)	Clarisse Agbegnenou (FRA)	Katarina Krišto (CRO)	Lucy Renshall (GBR)
Middleweight (−70 kg)	Miriam Butkereit (GER)	Marie-Ève Gahié (FRA)	Barbara Matić (CRO)
Middleweight (−70 kg)	Miriam Butkereit (GER)	Marie-Ève Gahié (FRA)	Margaux Pinot (FRA)
Half-heavyweight (−78 kg)	Anna-Maria Wagner (GER)	Alice Bellandi (ITA)	Guusje Steenhuis (NED)
Half-heavyweight (−78 kg)	Anna-Maria Wagner (GER)	Alice Bellandi (ITA)	Madeleine Malonga (FRA)
Heavyweight (+78 kg)	Romane Dicko (FRA)	Kayra Sayit (TUR)	Léa Fontaine (FRA)
Heavyweight (+78 kg)	Romane Dicko (FRA)	Kayra Sayit (TUR)	Raz Hershko (ISR)

Source results:

=== Medal table ===
* Host nation (France)

Rank	Nation	Gold	Silver	Bronze	Total
1	France (FRA)*	6	1	5	12
2	Japan (JPN)	3	2	3	8
3	Germany (GER)	2	0	0	2
4	Turkey (TUR)	1	1	0	2
5	Kosovo (KOS)	1	0	1	2
6	Belgium (BEL)	1	0	0	1
7	Azerbaijan (AZE)	0	2	0	2
7	South Korea (KOR)	0	2	0	2
9	Spain (ESP)	0	1	4	5
10	Canada (CAN)	0	1	2	3
11	Croatia (CRO)	0	1	1	2
11	Great Britain (GBR)	0	1	1	2
11	Italy (ITA)	0	1	1	2
14	Georgia (GEO)	0	1	0	1
15	Uzbekistan (UZB)	0	0	2	2
16	Israel (ISR)	0	0	1	1
16	Kazakhstan (KAZ)	0	0	1	1
16	Kyrgyzstan (KGZ)	0	0	1	1
16	Mongolia (MGL)	0	0	1	1
16	Netherlands (NED)	0	0	1	1
16	Serbia (SRB)	0	0	1	1
16	United Arab Emirates (UAE)	0	0	1	1
–	Individual Neutral Athletes (AIN)	0	0	1	1
Totals (22 entries)		14	14	28	56

== Prize money ==
The sums written are per medalist, bringing the total prizes awarded to €154,000. (retrieved from:)

Medal	Total	Judoka	Coach
Gold	€5,000	€4,000	€1,000
Silver	€3,000	€2,400	€600
Bronze	€1,500	€1,200	€300
