= Adrián Gandía =

Puerto Rican judoka (born 1997)

Personal information
- Born: 19 December 1997 (age 28) Trujillo Alto, Puerto Rico
- Occupation: Judoka

Sport
- Country: Puerto Rico
- Sport: Judo
- Weight class: ‍–‍81 kg

Achievements and titles
- Olympic Games: R16 (2024)
- World Champ.: R32 (2019, 2021, 2024, 2025)
- Pan American Champ.: (2020)
Medal record
Men's judo
Representing Puerto Rico
Pan American Games
Bronze medal – third place	2019 Lima	‍–‍81 kg
Pan American Championships
Gold medal – first place	2020 Guadalajara	‍–‍81 kg
Bronze medal – third place	2018 San José	‍–‍81 kg
Bronze medal – third place	2023 Calgary	‍–‍81 kg
Bronze medal – third place	2024 Rio de Janeiro	‍–‍81 kg
Central American and Caribbean Games
Gold medal – first place	2023 San Salvador	‍–‍81 kg
Gold medal – first place	2026 Santo Domingo	‍–‍81 kg
Silver medal – second place	2018 Barranquilla	‍–‍81 kg
Pan American Junior Championships
Silver medal – second place	2014 San Salvador	‍–‍73 kg
Pan American Cadet Championships
Silver medal – second place	2013 Buenos Aires	‍–‍66 kg
Silver medal – second place	2014 San Salvador	‍–‍66 kg

Profile at external databases
- IJF: 13580
- JudoInside.com: 83987
- Updated on 27 July 2026

Adrián Gandía Ginés (born 19 December 1997) is a Puerto Rican judoka.

Gandía is the gold medallist of the 2020 Pan American Judo Championships in the ‍–‍81 kg category.
