= 2024 Judo Grand Slam Baku =

Judo competition

Judo 2024 Judo Grand Slam Baku
- Venue: National Gymnastics Arena
- Location: Baku, Azerbaijan
- Dates: 16–18 February 2024
- Competitors: 404 from 62 nations
- Total prize money: €154,000

Competition at external databases
- Links: IJF • EJU • JudoInside

The 2024 Judo Grand Slam Baku was a Judo Grand Slam tournament held at the National Gymnastics Arena in Baku, Azerbaijan, from 16 to 18 February 2024 as part of the IJF World Tour and during the 2024 Summer Olympics qualification period.

== Medal summary ==
=== Men's events ===
Event	Gold	Silver	Bronze
Extra-lightweight (−60 kg)	Ramazan Abdulaev (AIN)	Luka Mkheidze (FRA)	Balabay Aghayev (AZE)
Extra-lightweight (−60 kg)	Ramazan Abdulaev (AIN)	Luka Mkheidze (FRA)	Doston Ruziev (UZB)
Half-lightweight (−66 kg)	Alberto Gaitero (ESP)	Daikii Bouba (FRA)	Yashar Najafov (AZE)
Half-lightweight (−66 kg)	Alberto Gaitero (ESP)	Daikii Bouba (FRA)	Rufat Aleskerov (AIN)
Lightweight (−73 kg)	Hidayat Heydarov (AZE)	Abubakr Sherov (TJK)	Arthur Margelidon (CAN)
Lightweight (−73 kg)	Hidayat Heydarov (AZE)	Abubakr Sherov (TJK)	Ejder Toktay (TUR)
Half-middleweight (−81 kg)	Zelim Tckaev (AZE)	Omar Rajabli (AZE)	Askerbii Gerbekov (BHR)
Half-middleweight (−81 kg)	Zelim Tckaev (AZE)	Omar Rajabli (AZE)	Frank de Wit (NED)
Middleweight (−90 kg)	Murad Fatiyev (AZE)	Krisztián Tóth (HUN)	Ivaylo Ivanov (BUL)
Middleweight (−90 kg)	Murad Fatiyev (AZE)	Krisztián Tóth (HUN)	Vugar Talibov (AZE)
Half-heavyweight (−100 kg)	Ilia Sulamanidze (GEO)	Piotr Kuczera (POL)	Michael Korrel (NED)
Half-heavyweight (−100 kg)	Ilia Sulamanidze (GEO)	Piotr Kuczera (POL)	Niyaz Bilalov (AIN)
Heavyweight (+100 kg)	Valeriy Endovitskiy (AIN)	Dzhamal Gamzatkhanov (AZE)	Jelle Snippe (NED)
Heavyweight (+100 kg)	Valeriy Endovitskiy (AIN)	Dzhamal Gamzatkhanov (AZE)	Jur Spijkers (NED)

=== Women's events ===
Event	Gold	Silver	Bronze
Extra-lightweight (−48 kg)	Tara Babulfath (SWE)	Milica Nikolić (SRB)	Khalimajon Kurbonova (UZB)
Extra-lightweight (−48 kg)	Tara Babulfath (SWE)	Milica Nikolić (SRB)	Abiba Abuzhakynova (KAZ)
Half-lightweight (−52 kg)	Diyora Keldiyorova (UZB)	Odette Giuffrida (ITA)	Róza Gyertyás (HUN)
Half-lightweight (−52 kg)	Diyora Keldiyorova (UZB)	Odette Giuffrida (ITA)	Ariane Toro (ESP)
Lightweight (−57 kg)	Christa Deguchi (CAN)	Nora Gjakova (KOS)	Daria Bilodid (UKR)
Lightweight (−57 kg)	Christa Deguchi (CAN)	Nora Gjakova (KOS)	Eteri Liparteliani (GEO)
Half-middleweight (−63 kg)	Lubjana Piovesana (AUT)	Catherine Beauchemin-Pinard (CAN)	Szofi Özbas (HUN)
Half-middleweight (−63 kg)	Lubjana Piovesana (AUT)	Catherine Beauchemin-Pinard (CAN)	Joanne van Lieshout (NED)
Middleweight (−70 kg)	Barbara Matić (CRO)	Marie-Ève Gahié (FRA)	Szabina Gercsák (HUN)
Middleweight (−70 kg)	Barbara Matić (CRO)	Marie-Ève Gahié (FRA)	Elisavet Teltsidou (GRE)
Half-heavyweight (−78 kg)	Guusje Steenhuis (NED)	Yuliia Kurchenko (UKR)	Anna Monta Olek (GER)
Half-heavyweight (−78 kg)	Guusje Steenhuis (NED)	Yuliia Kurchenko (UKR)	Yelyzaveta Lytvynenko (UKR)
Heavyweight (+78 kg)	Romane Dicko (FRA)	Asya Tavano (ITA)	Marit Kamps (NED)
Heavyweight (+78 kg)	Romane Dicko (FRA)	Asya Tavano (ITA)	Elis Startseva (AIN)

=== Medal table ===
* Host nation (Azerbaijan)

Rank	Nation	Gold	Silver	Bronze	Total
1	Azerbaijan (AZE)*	3	2	3	8
–	Individual Neutral Athletes (AIN)	2	0	3	5
2	France (FRA)	1	3	0	4
3	Canada (CAN)	1	1	1	3
4	Netherlands (NED)	1	0	6	7
5	Uzbekistan (UZB)	1	0	2	3
6	Georgia (GEO)	1	0	1	2
6	Spain (ESP)	1	0	1	2
8	Austria (AUT)	1	0	0	1
8	Croatia (CRO)	1	0	0	1
8	Sweden (SWE)	1	0	0	1
11	Italy (ITA)	0	2	0	2
12	Hungary (HUN)	0	1	3	4
13	Ukraine (UKR)	0	1	2	3
14	Kosovo (KOS)	0	1	0	1
14	Poland (POL)	0	1	0	1
14	Serbia (SRB)	0	1	0	1
14	Tajikistan (TJK)	0	1	0	1
18	Bahrain (BHR)	0	0	1	1
18	Bulgaria (BUL)	0	0	1	1
18	Germany (GER)	0	0	1	1
18	Greece (GRE)	0	0	1	1
18	Kazakhstan (KAZ)	0	0	1	1
18	Turkey (TUR)	0	0	1	1
Totals (23 entries)		14	14	28	56

== Prize money ==
The sums written are per medalist, bringing the total prizes awarded to €154,000. (retrieved from:)

Medal	Total	Judoka	Coach
Gold	€5,000	€4,000	€1,000
Silver	€3,000	€2,400	€600
Bronze	€1,500	€1,200	€300
