= Alain Mikael Aprahamian =

Uruguayan judoka (born 1988)

Alain Aprahamian
Personal information
- Full name: Alain Mikael Aprahamian Bakerdjian
- Nationality: Uruguayan
- Born: 26 January 1988 (age 38)
- Occupation: Judoka

Sport
- Country: Uruguay
- Sport: Judo
- Weight class: –81 kg

Achievements and titles
- Olympic Games: R32 (2020, 2024)
- World Champ.: R32 (2014)
- Pan American Champ.: 7th (2015, 2019, 2021)

Profile at external databases
- IJF: 10959
- JudoInside.com: 86723
- Updated on 30 July 2024

Alain Mikael Aprahamian Bakerdjian (Note: In this Spanish name, the first or paternal surname is Aprahamian and the second or maternal family name is Bakerdjian.) (born 26 January 1988) is a Uruguayan judoka of Armenian descent.

Aprahamian qualified to the 2020 Summer Olympics 81 kg tournament, where he lost at the round of 32. He also competed in the 2024 Summer Olympics 81 kg tournament.

His brother Pablo is also a judoka.
