= Somon Makhmadbekov =

Tajikistani judoka (born 1999)

Personal information
- Nationality: Tajikistani
- Born: 24 March 1999 (age 27) Irkutsk, Russia
- Occupation: Judoka

Sport
- Country: Tajikistan
- Sport: Judo
- Weight class: ‍–‍73 kg, ‍–‍81 kg

Achievements and titles
- Olympic Games: (bronze) (2024)
- World Champ.: (bronze) (2024)
- Asian Champ.: (gold) (2023)
- Highest world ranking: 1^{st}
Medal record
Men's judo
Representing Tajikistan
Olympic Games
Bronze medal – third place	2024 Paris	‍–‍81 kg
World Championships
Bronze medal – third place	2024 Abu Dhabi	‍–‍81 kg
Asian Games
Gold medal – first place	2023 Hangzhou	‍–‍81 kg
Asian Championships
Silver medal – second place	2021 Bishkek	‍–‍73 kg
Silver medal – second place	2025 Bangkok	‍–‍81 kg
Silver medal – second place	2026 Ordos	‍–‍81 kg
Bronze medal – third place	2022 Nur‑Sultan	‍–‍81 kg
Bronze medal – third place	2024 Hong Kong	‍–‍81 kg
IJF Grand Slam
Gold medal – first place	2023 Astana	‍–‍81 kg
Gold medal – first place	2025 Dushanbe	‍–‍81 kg
Gold medal – first place	2026 Dushanbe	‍–‍81 kg
Bronze medal – third place	2019 Osaka	‍–‍73 kg
Bronze medal – third place	2023 Tashkent	‍–‍81 kg
IJF Grand Prix
Gold medal – first place	2023 Dushanbe	‍–‍81 kg
World Juniors Championships
Gold medal – first place	2019 Marrakesh	‍–‍73 kg
Bronze medal – third place	2017 Zagreb	‍–‍66 kg

Profile at external databases
- IJF: 20302
- JudoInside.com: 96674
- Updated on 2 May 2026

Somon Makhmadbekov (Tajik: Сомон Маҳмадбеков; born 24 March 1999) is a Tajikistani judoka.

Makhmadbekov is one of the bronze medalists of the 2019 Judo Grand Slam Osaka in the ‍–‍73 kg weight category. He competed in the men's 73 kg event at the 2020 Summer Olympics in Tokyo, Japan. While in the 2024 Summer Paris Olympics he tied 3rd place with Lee Joon-hwan in the Men's 81 kg event.
