= Lee Joon-hwan =

South Korean judoka (born 2002)

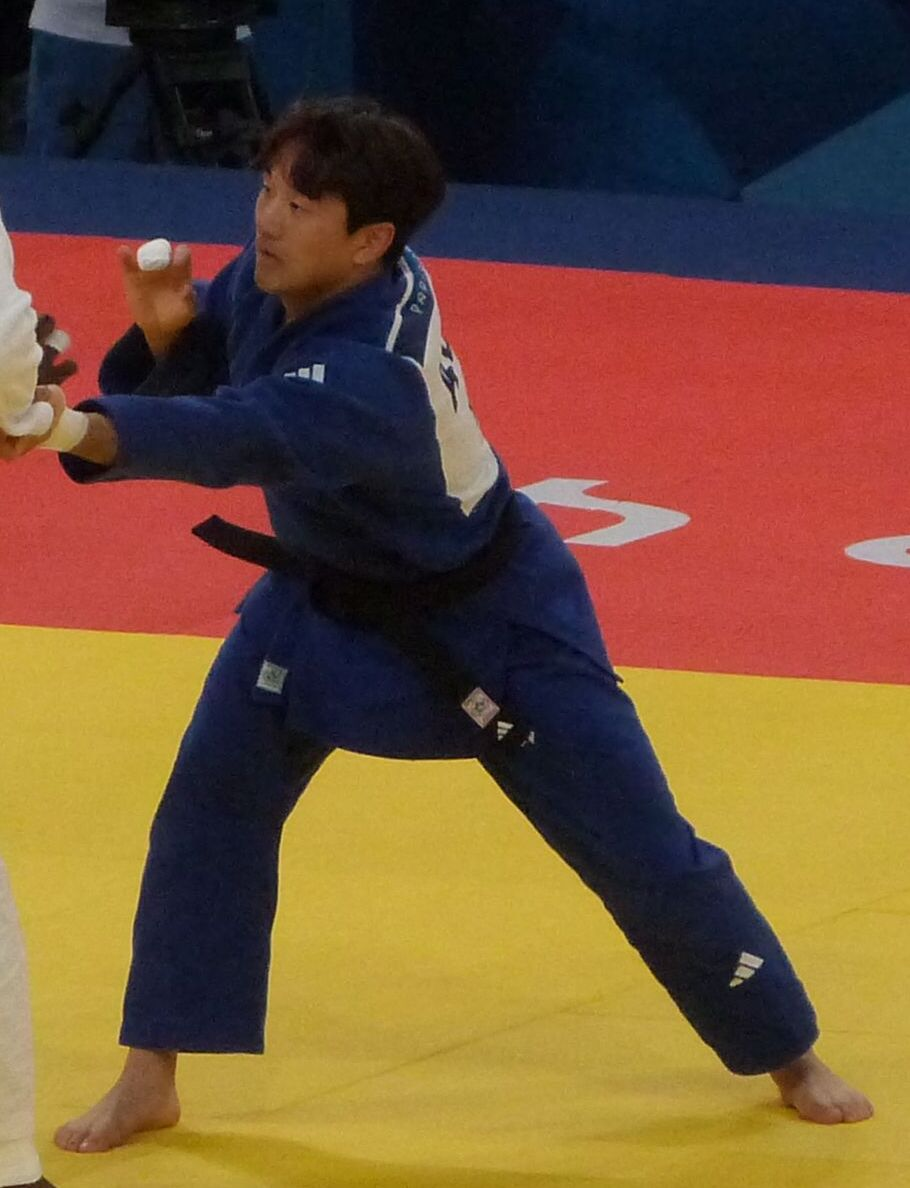
- Lee in 2024

Personal information
- Born: 이준환; 19 June 2002 (age 24) Gumi, North Gyeongsang, South Korea
- Occupation: Judoka
- Height: 176 cm (5 ft 9 in)

Sport
- Country: South Korea
- Sport: Judo
- Weight class: ‍–‍81 kg

Achievements and titles
- Olympic Games: (bronze) (2024)
- World Champ.: (bronze) (2023, 2024, 2025)
- Asian Champ.: (gold) (2024, 2025)
- Highest world ranking: 1^{st}
Medal record
Men's judo
Representing South Korea
Olympic Games
Bronze medal – third place	2024 Paris	‍–‍81 kg
Bronze medal – third place	2024 Paris	Mixed team
World Championships
Silver medal – second place	2025 Budapest	Mixed team
Bronze medal – third place	2023 Doha	‍–‍81 kg
Bronze medal – third place	2024 Abu Dhabi	‍–‍81 kg
Bronze medal – third place	2025 Budapest	‍–‍81 kg
Asian Games
Silver medal – second place	2023 Hangzhou	‍–‍81 kg
Bronze medal – third place	2026 Aichi‑Nagoya	‍–‍81 kg
Asian Championships
Gold medal – first place	2024 Hong Kong	‍–‍81 kg
Gold medal – first place	2025 Bangkok	‍–‍81 kg
IJF Grand Slam
Gold medal – first place	2022 Tbilisi	‍–‍81 kg
Gold medal – first place	2022 Ulaanbaatar	‍–‍81 kg
Gold medal – first place	2023 Tokyo	‍–‍81 kg
Gold medal – first place	2025 Astana	‍–‍81 kg
Gold medal – first place	2026 Ulaanbaatar	‍–‍81 kg
Silver medal – second place	2023 Ulaanbaatar	‍–‍81 kg
IJF Grand Prix
Gold medal – first place	2023 Almada	‍–‍81 kg
Bronze medal – third place	2024 Odivelas	‍–‍81 kg
World University Games
Bronze medal – third place	2021 Chengdu	Men's team
Bronze medal – third place	2025 Rhine‑Ruhr	‍–‍81 kg
Bronze medal – third place	2025 Rhine-Ruhr	Mixed team
Asian Cadet Championships
Bronze medal – third place	2018 Beirut	‍–‍73 kg

Profile at external databases
- IJF: 55160
- JudoInside.com: 116416
- Updated on 1 October 2026

Lee Joon-hwan (born 19 June 2002) is a South Korean judoka.

Lee won gold medals at the 2022 Tbilisi Grand Slam and the 2022 Ulaanbaatar Grand Slam. In the 2024 Summer Paris Olympics he tied 3rd place with Somon Makhmadbekov in the men's 81 kg event.
