= 2026 European Judo Championships =

Judo 2026 European Judo Championships
- Venue: Olympic Palace
- Location: Tbilisi, Georgia
- Dates: 16–19 April
- Competitors: 400 from 46 nations

Competition at external databases
- Links: IJF • JudoInside

The 2026 European Judo Championships was held in Tbilisi, Georgia, from 16 to 19 April 2026 as part of the IJF World Tour.

== Medal summary ==
=== Men's events ===
Event	Gold	Silver	Bronze
Extra-lightweight (−60 kg)	Luka Mkheidze; France	Giorgi Sardalashvili; Georgia	Izhak Ashpiz; Israel
Extra-lightweight (−60 kg)	Luka Mkheidze; France	Giorgi Sardalashvili; Georgia	Ahmad Yusifov; Azerbaijan
Half-lightweight (−66 kg)	Murad Chopanov; Russia	Luukas Saha; Finland	Walide Khyar; France
Half-lightweight (−66 kg)	Murad Chopanov; Russia	Luukas Saha; Finland	Turan Bayramov; Azerbaijan
Lightweight (−73 kg)	Lasha Shavdatuashvili; Georgia	Hidayat Heydarov; Azerbaijan	Bilal Çiloğlu; Turkey
Lightweight (−73 kg)	Lasha Shavdatuashvili; Georgia	Hidayat Heydarov; Azerbaijan	Dayyan Boulemtafes; France
Half-middleweight (−81 kg)	Timur Arbuzov; Russia	Tato Grigalashvili; Georgia	Mihajlo Simin; Serbia
Half-middleweight (−81 kg)	Timur Arbuzov; Russia	Tato Grigalashvili; Georgia	Zelim Tckaev; Azerbaijan
Middleweight (−90 kg)	Luka Maisuradze; Georgia	Nemanja Majdov; Serbia	Maxime-Gaël Ngayap Hambou; France
Middleweight (−90 kg)	Luka Maisuradze; Georgia	Nemanja Majdov; Serbia	Alex Creț; Romania
Half-heavyweight (−100 kg)	Gennaro Pirelli; Italy	Simeon Catharina; Netherlands	Arman Adamian; Russia
Half-heavyweight (−100 kg)	Gennaro Pirelli; Italy	Simeon Catharina; Netherlands	Ilia Sulamanidze; Georgia
Heavyweight (+100 kg)	Guram Tushishvili; Georgia	Lukáš Krpálek; Czech Republic	Valeriy Endovitskiy; Russia
Heavyweight (+100 kg)	Guram Tushishvili; Georgia	Lukáš Krpálek; Czech Republic	İbrahim Tataroğlu; Turkey

=== Women's events ===
Event	Gold	Silver	Bronze
Extra-lightweight (−48 kg)	Shirine Boukli; France	Sabina Giliazova; Russia	Marina Vorobeva; Russia
Extra-lightweight (−48 kg)	Shirine Boukli; France	Sabina Giliazova; Russia	Laura Martínez; Spain
Half-lightweight (−52 kg)	Distria Krasniqi; Kosovo	Amandine Buchard; France	Odette Giuffrida; Italy
Half-lightweight (−52 kg)	Distria Krasniqi; Kosovo	Amandine Buchard; France	Ariane Toro; Spain
Lightweight (−57 kg)	Eteri Liparteliani; Georgia	Timna Nelson-Levy; Israel	Binta Ndiaye; Switzerland
Lightweight (−57 kg)	Eteri Liparteliani; Georgia	Timna Nelson-Levy; Israel	Sarah-Léonie Cysique; France
Half-middleweight (−63 kg)	Joanne van Lieshout; Netherlands	Manon Deketer; France	Iva Oberan; Croatia
Half-middleweight (−63 kg)	Joanne van Lieshout; Netherlands	Manon Deketer; France	Angelika Szymańska; Poland
Middleweight (−70 kg)	Szofi Özbas; Hungary	Melkia Auchecorne; France	Madina Taimazova; Russia
Middleweight (−70 kg)	Szofi Özbas; Hungary	Melkia Auchecorne; France	April Lynn Fohouo; Switzerland
Half-heavyweight (−78 kg)	Alice Bellandi; Italy	Emma Reid; Great Britain	Metka Lobnik; Slovenia
Half-heavyweight (−78 kg)	Alice Bellandi; Italy	Emma Reid; Great Britain	Kaïla Issoufi; France
Heavyweight (+78 kg)	Raz Hershko; Israel	Léa Fontaine; France	Asya Tavano; Italy
Heavyweight (+78 kg)	Raz Hershko; Israel	Léa Fontaine; France	Romane Dicko; France

== Medal table ==
* Host nation (Georgia)

Rank	Nation	Gold	Silver	Bronze	Total
1	Georgia (GEO)*	4	2	1	7
2	France (FRA)	2	4	6	12
3	Russia (RUS)	2	1	4	7
4	Italy (ITA)	2	0	2	4
5	Israel (ISR)	1	1	1	3
6	Netherlands (NED)	1	1	0	2
7	Hungary (HUN)	1	0	0	1
7	Kosovo (KOS)	1	0	0	1
9	Azerbaijan (AZE)	0	1	3	4
10	Serbia (SRB)	0	1	1	2
11	Czech Republic (CZE)	0	1	0	1
11	Finland (FIN)	0	1	0	1
11	Great Britain (GBR)	0	1	0	1
14	Spain (ESP)	0	0	2	2
14	Switzerland (SUI)	0	0	2	2
14	Turkey (TUR)	0	0	2	2
17	Croatia (CRO)	0	0	1	1
17	Poland (POL)	0	0	1	1
17	Romania (ROU)	0	0	1	1
17	Slovenia (SLO)	0	0	1	1
Totals (20 entries)		14	14	28	56
