= João Fernando =

Portuguese judoka (born 1999)

Personal information
- Born: 7 November 1999 (age 26)
- Occupation: Judoka

Sport
- Country: Portugal
- Sport: Judo
- Weight class: ‍–‍73 kg, ‍–‍81 kg

Achievements and titles
- Olympic Games: R32 (2024)
- World Champ.: R16 (2025)
- European Champ.: R16 (2020, 2021)
Medal record
Men's judo
Representing Portugal
IJF Grand Slam
Bronze medal – third place	2024 Antalya	‍–‍81 kg
IJF Grand Prix
Bronze medal – third place	2022 Zagreb	‍–‍81 kg
Bronze medal – third place	2024 Linz	‍–‍81 kg
European Junior Championships
Silver medal – second place	2018 Sofia	‍–‍73 kg
Mediterranean Games
Gold medal – first place	2026 Taranto	‍–‍81 kg

Profile at external databases
- IJF: 21665
- JudoInside.com: 38314
- Updated on 1 September 2026

João Fernando (born 7 November 1999) is a Portuguese judoka. Fernando took up judo at 5 years old, inspired by his father who practiced judo in his teenage years. Fernando represented Portugal at the 2024 Summer Olympics in the men's 81 kg category in judo, where he lost to Canadian François Gauthier-Drapeau. At the 2025 European Cup in Málaga, Fernando won a silver medal after falling to Muhammed Koc. Fernando participated in the 2025 World Championships in Budapest, where he ranked 9th in the men's 81 kg category.
