= Tato Grigalashvili =

Georgian judoka (born 1999)

Personal information
- Native name: ტატო გრიგალაშვილი
- Born: 1 December 1999 (age 26)
- Occupation: Judoka
- Height: 1.78 m (5 ft 10 in)
- Spouse: Tamar Gogoladze (m. 2021)

Sport
- Country: Georgia
- Sport: Judo
- Weight class: ‍–‍81 kg, ‍–‍90 kg
- Rank: Black belt
- Club: Kraftsportverein Esslingen 1894

Achievements and titles
- Olympic Games: (silver) (2024)
- World Champ.: (gold) (2022, 2023, 2024, 2026)
- European Champ.: (gold) (2020, 2022, 2024)
- Highest world ranking: 1^{st}
Medal record
Men's judo
Representing Georgia
Olympic Games
Silver medal – second place	2024 Paris	‍–‍81 kg
World Championships
Gold medal – first place	2022 Tashkent	‍–‍81 kg
Gold medal – first place	2023 Doha	‍–‍81 kg
Gold medal – first place	2024 Abu Dhabi	‍–‍81 kg
Gold medal – first place	2026 Baku	‍–‍81 kg
Silver medal – second place	2021 Budapest	‍–‍81 kg
Silver medal – second place	2025 Budapest	‍–‍81 kg
European Championships
Gold medal – first place	2020 Prague	‍–‍81 kg
Gold medal – first place	2022 Sofia	‍–‍81 kg
Gold medal – first place	2024 Zagreb	‍–‍81 kg
Silver medal – second place	2023 Montpellier	‍–‍81 kg
Silver medal – second place	2025 Podgorica	‍–‍81 kg
Silver medal – second place	2026 Tbilisi	‍–‍81 kg
World Masters
Gold medal – first place	2021 Doha	‍–‍81 kg
Gold medal – first place	2022 Jerusalem	‍–‍81 kg
Bronze medal – third place	2023 Budapest	‍–‍81 kg
IJF Grand Slam
Gold medal – first place	2020 Düsseldorf	‍–‍81 kg
Gold medal – first place	2023 Paris	‍–‍81 kg
Silver medal – second place	2021 Paris	‍–‍81 kg
Silver medal – second place	2022 Paris	‍–‍81 kg
Silver medal – second place	2022 Tbilisi	‍–‍81 kg
Bronze medal – third place	2019 Baku	‍–‍81 kg
Bronze medal – third place	2021 Tbilisi	‍–‍81 kg
IJF Grand Prix
Gold medal – first place	2019 Budapest	‍–‍81 kg
Gold medal – first place	2021 Zagreb	‍–‍81 kg
Gold medal – first place	2026 Linz	‍–‍90 kg
Silver medal – second place	2025 Linz	‍–‍90 kg
Bronze medal – third place	2018 Antalya	‍–‍81 kg
Bronze medal – third place	2019 Tbilisi	‍–‍81 kg
Bronze medal – third place	2019 Zagreb	‍–‍81 kg
Bronze medal – third place	2022 Zagreb	‍–‍81 kg
European U23 Championships
Gold medal – first place	2020 Poreč	‍–‍81 kg
Gold medal – first place	2021 Budapest	‍–‍81 kg
World Juniors Championships
Bronze medal – third place	2017 Zagreb	‍–‍73 kg
Bronze medal – third place	2019 Marrakesh	‍–‍81 kg
European Junior Championships
Gold medal – first place	2019 Vantaa	‍–‍81 kg
Silver medal – second place	2018 Sofia	‍–‍81 kg
Bronze medal – third place	2017 Maribor	‍–‍73 kg
World University Games
Bronze medal – third place	2019 Naples	‍–‍81 kg

Profile at external databases
- IJF: 30227
- JudoInside.com: 103978
- Updated on 7 October 2026

Tato Grigalashvili (Georgian: ტატო გრიგალაშვილი; born 1 December 1999) is a Georgian judoka. He won the silver medal in the men's 81 kg event at the 2024 Summer Olympics in Paris, France. He is a six-time medalist, including four gold medals, in the men's 81 kg event at the World Judo Championships. He is also a three-time gold medalist in his event at the European Judo Championships.

== Career ==
In 2018, Grigalashvili won one of the bronze medals in the men's 81 kg event at the 2018 Grand Prix Antalya held in Antalya, Turkey.

The following year, Grigalashvili won one of the bronze medals in this event at the 2019 Tbilisi Grand Prix held in Tbilisi, Georgia. In the same year, he won one of the bronze medals in the men's 81 kg event at the 2019 Summer Universiade held in Naples, Italy.

In 2020, Grigalashvili won the gold medal in the men's 81 kg event at the 2020 Düsseldorf Grand Slam held in Düsseldorf, Germany. He is also the gold medalist in the men's 81 kg event at the 2020 European Championships held in Prague, Czech Republic.

In 2021, Grigalashvili won the gold medal in his event at the 2021 World Masters held in Doha, Qatar. He won the silver medal in the men's 81 kg event at the 2021 World Championships held in Budapest, Hungary.

Grigalashvili won the silver medal in his event at the 2022 Paris Grand Slam held in Paris, France. He won the gold medal in the men's 81 kg event at the 2022 European Championships held in Sofia, Bulgaria.

At 2024 Summer Olympics, he won silver medal at ‍–‍81 kg weight class.

On 7 October 2026, at the 2026 World Championship in Baku, he defeated his Azerbaijani opponent Zelim Tckaev in the final and won the gold medal.

== Achievements ==
Year	Tournament	Place	Weight class
2019	Summer Universiade	3rd	−81 kg
2020	European Championships	1st	−81 kg
2021	Judo World Masters	1st	−81 kg
2021	World Championships	2nd	−81 kg
2022	European Championships	1st	−81 kg
2022	World Championships	1st	−81 kg
2023	World Championships	1st	−81 kg
2023	European Championships	2nd	−81 kg
2024	European Championships	1st	−81 kg
2024	World Championships	1st	−81 kg
2024	Summer Olympics	2nd	−81 kg
2025	European Championships	2nd	−81 kg
2025	World Championships	2nd	−81 kg
2026	European Championships	2nd	−81 kg
2026	World Championships	1st	−81 kg
