= Timo Cavelius =

German athlete

Personal information
- Born: 17 October 1996 (age 29)
- Occupation: Judoka

Sport
- Country: Germany
- Sport: Judo
- Weight class: ‍–‍81 kg
- League: Judo Bundesliga
- Team: TSV Abensberg

Achievements and titles
- Olympic Games: R32 (2024)
- World Champ.: R16 (2023)
- European Champ.: R16 (2025)
Medal record
Men's judo
Representing Germany
IJF Grand Slam
Silver medal – second place	2023 Paris	‍–‍81 kg
Silver medal – second place	2024 Astana	‍–‍81 kg
Bronze medal – third place	2023 Tel Aviv	‍–‍81 kg
Bronze medal – third place	2023 Tbilisi	‍–‍81 kg
IJF Grand Prix
Silver medal – second place	2019 Tbilisi	‍–‍81 kg
European U23 Championships
Bronze medal – third place	2018 Győr	‍–‍81 kg

Profile at external databases
- IJF: 21515
- JudoInside.com: 84782
- Updated on 13 June 2026

Timo Cavelius (born 1996) is a German Olympic judoka. Representing Germany at the 2024 Summer Olympics, he made his Olympic debut and became the first openly gay man to compete in Olympic judo. Cavelius participated in the Half-Middleweight (‍–‍81 kg) men's judo category.

Cavelius began his judo career as a child, going on to earn a ranking of 21st in the world and qualify for the 2024 Summer Olympics. Through 2025 and 2026, Cavelius has continued to compete at Grand Slams across the world.

== Club championships ==
During the 2026 German Judo Bundesliga season, the Georgian judoka Akaki Japaridze (JC Leipzig) punched Cavelius after their match had ended, causing him to lose two teeth and suffer a broken jaw. Japaridze claimed he felt provoked by a celebratory gesture made by the German judoka.
