= Attila Ungvári =

Hungarian judoka (born 1988)

Personal information
- Born: 25 October 1988 (age 37) Cegled, Hungary
- Occupation: Judoka
- Height: 185 cm (6 ft 1 in)

Sport
- Country: Hungary
- Sport: Judo
- Weight class: ‍–‍81 kg
- Club: Cegléd
- Coached by: Támás Bíró

Achievements and titles
- Olympic Games: R16 (2024)
- World Champ.: 7th (2022, 2023)
- European Champ.: (bronze) (2010, 2019, 2022)
Medal record
Men's judo
Representing Hungary
European Games
Bronze medal – third place	2019 Minsk	‍–‍81 kg
European Championships
Bronze medal – third place	2010 Vienna	‍–‍73 kg
Bronze medal – third place	2022 Sofia	‍–‍81 kg
World Masters
Bronze medal – third place	2011 Baku	‍–‍73 kg
IJF Grand Slam
Gold medal – first place	2021 Kazan	‍–‍81 kg
Gold medal – first place	2023 Tashkent	‍–‍81 kg
Silver medal – second place	2010 Rio de Janeiro	‍–‍73 kg
Silver medal – second place	2011 Paris	‍–‍73 kg
Silver medal – second place	2017 Ekaterinburg	‍–‍81 kg
Bronze medal – third place	2009 Moscow	‍–‍73 kg
Bronze medal – third place	2021 Antalya	‍–‍81 kg
Bronze medal – third place	2022 Baku	‍–‍81 kg
IJF Grand Prix
Gold medal – first place	2017 Zagreb	‍–‍81 kg
Silver medal – second place	2015 Ulaanbaatar	‍–‍81 kg
Silver medal – second place	2017 Düsseldorf	‍–‍81 kg
Bronze medal – third place	2014 Samsun	‍–‍81 kg
Bronze medal – third place	2016 Budapest	‍–‍81 kg
Bronze medal – third place	2017 Cancún	‍–‍81 kg
Bronze medal – third place	2019 Budapest	‍–‍81 kg
European U23 Championships
Gold medal – first place	2010 Sarajevo	‍–‍73 kg
Silver medal – second place	2009 Antalya	‍–‍73 kg
Bronze medal – third place	2007 Salzburg	‍–‍66 kg
Summer Universiade
Silver medal – second place	2009 Belgrade	‍–‍73 kg
Bronze medal – third place	2013 Kazan	Men's team

Profile at external databases
- IJF: 343
- JudoInside.com: 41561
- Updated on 31 July 2024

Attila Ungvári (born 25 October 1988) is a Hungarian judoka.

Ungvári is a bronze medalist from the 2019 European Judo Championships and represented Hungary at the 2020 Summer Olympics.
