= Antonio Esposito (judoka) =

Italian judoka (born 1994)

Personal information
- Born: 18 November 1994 (age 31)
- Occupation: Judoka
- Height: 173 cm (5 ft 8 in)

Sport
- Country: Italy
- Sport: Judo
- Weight class: ‍–‍81 kg
- Coached by: Giuseppe Maddaloni

Achievements and titles
- Olympic Games: 5th (2024)
- World Champ.: R16 (2024, 2026)
- European Champ.: (bronze) (2018)
Medal record
Men's judo
Representing Italy
European Championships
Bronze medal – third place	2018 Tel Aviv	‍–‍81 kg
IJF Grand Slam
Bronze medal – third place	2022 Budapest	‍–‍81 kg
Bronze medal – third place	2023 Baku	‍–‍81 kg
IJF Grand Prix
Gold medal – first place	2024 Linz	‍–‍81 kg
Gold medal – first place	2025 Linz	‍–‍81 kg
Bronze medal – third place	2017 Zagreb	‍–‍81 kg
Bronze medal – third place	2018 The Hague	‍–‍81 kg
Bronze medal – third place	2025 Zagreb	‍–‍81 kg
European U23 Championships
Gold medal – first place	2014 Wrocław	‍–‍73 kg
Silver medal – second place	2015 Bratislava	‍–‍73 kg
Silver medal – second place	2016 Tel Aviv	‍–‍81 kg
World Juniors Championships
Gold medal – first place	2013 Ljubljana	‍–‍73 kg

Profile at external databases
- IJF: 14732
- JudoInside.com: 74928
- Updated on 7 October 2026

Antonio Esposito (born 18 November 1994) is an Italian judoka.

Esposito is a bronze medalist from the 2018 European Judo Championships in the ‍–‍81 kg category.
