= Matthias Casse =

Belgian judoka (born 1997)

Personal information
- Born: 19 February 1997 (age 29) Mortsel, Belgium
- Occupation: Judoka
- Website: www.matthiascasse.com

Sport
- Country: Belgium
- Sport: Judo
- Weight class: ‍–‍81 kg
- Rank: 2nd dan black belt
- Coached by: Dirk Van Tichelt

Achievements and titles
- Olympic Games: (bronze) (2020)
- World Champ.: (2021)
- European Champ.: (gold) (2019)
- Highest world ranking: 1^{st}
Medal record
Men's judo
Representing Belgium
Olympic Games
Bronze medal – third place	2020 Tokyo	‍–‍81 kg
World Championships
Gold medal – first place	2021 Budapest	‍–‍81 kg
Silver medal – second place	2019 Tokyo	‍–‍81 kg
Silver medal – second place	2022 Tashkent	‍–‍81 kg
Silver medal – second place	2023 Doha	‍–‍81 kg
European Games
Gold medal – first place	2019 Minsk	‍–‍81 kg
European Championships
Silver medal – second place	2021 Lisbon	‍–‍81 kg
Silver medal – second place	2022 Sofia	‍–‍81 kg
Bronze medal – third place	2020 Prague	‍–‍81 kg
Bronze medal – third place	2025 Podgorica	‍–‍81 kg
World Masters
Gold medal – first place	2019 Qingdao	‍–‍81 kg
Gold medal – first place	2023 Budapest	‍–‍81 kg
Bronze medal – third place	2022 Jerusalem	‍–‍81 kg
IJF Grand Slam
Gold medal – first place	2020 Paris	‍–‍81 kg
Gold medal – first place	2021 Abu Dhabi	‍–‍81 kg
Gold medal – first place	2022 Tel Aviv	‍–‍81 kg
Gold medal – first place	2023 Antalya	‍–‍81 kg
Gold medal – first place	2024 Paris	‍–‍81 kg
Gold medal – first place	2024 Tashkent	‍–‍81 kg
Silver medal – second place	2018 Abu Dhabi	‍–‍81 kg
Silver medal – second place	2022 Baku	‍–‍81 kg
Silver medal – second place	2023 Tokyo	‍–‍81 kg
Bronze medal – third place	2019 Düsseldorf	‍–‍81 kg
Bronze medal – third place	2019 Baku	‍–‍81 kg
Bronze medal – third place	2025 Paris	‍–‍81 kg
Bronze medal – third place	2026 Tbilisi	‍–‍81 kg
IJF Grand Prix
Gold medal – first place	2022 Almada	‍–‍81 kg
Silver medal – second place	2018 Agadir	‍–‍81 kg
Silver medal – second place	2018 Zagreb	‍–‍81 kg
Bronze medal – third place	2017 The Hague	‍–‍81 kg
Bronze medal – third place	2019 Montreal	‍–‍81 kg
World Juniors Championships
Gold medal – first place	2017 Zagreb	‍–‍81 kg

Profile at external databases
- IJF: 19675
- JudoInside.com: 63514
- Updated on 22 March 2026

Matthias Casse (born 19 February 1997) is a Belgian judoka, a 2021 World Champion who won a bronze medal at the 2020 Summer Olympics.

== Judo career ==
In 2017, Matthias Casse became junior world champion in Zagreb, the first Belgian male judoka to achieve this since Johan Laats in 1986. That same year, he won his first judo Grand Prix medal at senior level, winning a bronze medal in the Hague. In 2019 he won the gold medal at the European Games (this also was the European judo championship) and at the Judo World Masters. After having won the Paris Grand Slam in 2020 he became the no. 1 on the world ranking in his category. In June 2021, he became the first Belgian male judo world champion at the senior level by winning the gold at the 2021 World Judo Championships in Budapest, Hungary.
