= 2019 World Judo Championships – Men's 81 kg =

Judo competition

Judo Men's 81 kg at the 2019 World Judo Championships
- Venue: Nippon Budokan
- Location: Tokyo, Japan
- Date: 28 August
- Competitors: 82 from 65 nations
- Total prize money: 57,000$

Medalists
gold medal	Sagi Muki (1st title)	Israel
silver medal	Matthias Casse	Belgium
bronze medal	Antoine Valois-Fortier	Canada
bronze medal	Luka Maisuradze	Georgia

Competition at external databases
- Links: IJF • JudoInside

The Men's 81 kg competition at the 2019 World Judo Championships was held on 28 August 2019.

== Results ==
=== Finals ===
Semi-finals
(Iran) Saeid Mollaei	00
(Belgium) Matthias Casse	10
(Israel) Sagi Muki	01
(Egypt) Mohamed Abdelaal	00

Final
(Belgium) Matthias Casse	00
(Israel) Sagi Muki	10

=== Repechage ===
Repechage
(Canada) Antoine Valois-Fortier	11
(Germany) Dominic Ressel	00

Third place
(Canada) Antoine Valois-Fortier	01
(Egypt) Mohamed Abdelaal	00

Repechage
(Uzbekistan) Sharofiddin Boltaboev	01
(Georgia (country)) Luka Maisuradze	10

Third place
(Georgia (country)) Luka Maisuradze	10
(Iran) Saeid Mollaei	00

=== Pool A ===
First round
(Syria) Mohamad Kasem	00
(Morocco) Achraf Moutii	10
(Portugal) Carlos Luz	11
(Costa Rica) David Guillen	00
(Guam) Joshter Andrew	10
(Vanuatu) Hugo Cumbo	00
(Canada) Antoine Valois-Fortier	11
(Barbados) Asa Weithers	00
(South Korea) Lee Sung-ho	01
(Croatia) Dominik Družeta	00

Round of 64
(Iran) Saeid Mollaei	10
(Morocco) Achraf Moutii	00
(India) Jobandeep Singh	00
(Portugal) Carlos Luz	11
(Guam) Joshter Andrew	00
(Qatar) Morad Zemouri	10
(Russia) Khasan Khalmurzaev	10
(Tanzania) Khamis Ali	00
(Bulgaria) Ivaylo Ivanov	00
(Canada) Antoine Valois-Fortier	10
(Afghanistan) Jamaluddin Qaderi	00
(Argentina) Tomás Morales	11
(South Korea) Lee Sung-ho	00
(Lebanon) Nacif Elias	10
(Tajikistan) Akmal Murodov	11
(Democratic Republic of the Congo) Cedrick Kalonga	00

Round of 32
(Iran) Saeid Mollaei	10
(Portugal) Carlos Luz	00
(Qatar) Morad Zemouri	00
(Russia) Khasan Khalmurzaev	10
(Canada) Antoine Valois-Fortier	11
(Argentina) Tomás Morales	00
(Lebanon) Nacif Elias	10
(Tajikistan) Akmal Murodov	00

Round of 16
(Iran) Saeid Mollaei	01
(Russia) Khasan Khalmurzaev	00
(Canada) Antoine Valois-Fortier	01
(Lebanon) Nacif Elias	00

Quarterfinals
(Iran) Saeid Mollaei	10
(Canada) Antoine Valois-Fortier	00

=== Pool B ===
First round
(Slovakia) Filip Štancel	10
(Gabon) Terence Kouamba	00
(Uruguay) Alain Aprahamian	00
(Poland) Sebastian Marcinkiewicz	10
(Thailand) Masayuki Terada	01
(United States) Arthur Wright	00

Round of 64
(Belgium) Matthias Casse	10
(China) Zha Lasai	00
Odai Al Mawarde	00
(Italy) Antonio Esposito	10
(Jordan) Baker Al-Zidaneen	00
(Slovakia) Filip Štancel	10
(Kuwait) Mohammad Al-Bathali	00
(Peru) Luis Angeles	10
(Germany) Dominic Ressel	10
(Kazakhstan) Didar Khamza	00
(Moldova) Dorin Gotonoaga	00
(Poland) Sebastian Marcinkiewicz	10
(Egypt) Abdelrahman Mohamed	10
(Montenegro) Srđan Mrvaljević	00
(France) Alpha Djalo	11
(Thailand) Masayuki Terada	00

Round of 32
(Belgium) Matthias Casse	01
(Italy) Antonio Esposito	00
(Slovakia) Filip Štancel	10
(Peru) Luis Angeles	00
(Germany) Dominic Ressel	01
(Poland) Sebastian Marcinkiewicz	00
(Egypt) Abdelrahman Mohamed	10
(France) Alpha Djalo	00

Round of 16
(Belgium) Matthias Casse	10
(Slovakia) Filip Štancel	00
(Germany) Dominic Ressel	01
(Egypt) Abdelrahman Mohamed	00

Quarterfinals
(Belgium) Matthias Casse	10
(Germany) Dominic Ressel	00

=== Pool C ===
First round
(Estonia) Kristjan Toniste	00
(Kazakhstan) Ruslan Mussayev	10
(Russia) Aslan Lappinagov	00
(Sweden) Robin Pacek	01
(Philippines) Marco Tumampad	00
(United States) Jack Hatton	10
(Moldova) Nicon Zaboroșciuc	00
(Uzbekistan) Sharofiddin Boltaboev	10
(United Kingdom) Stuart McWatt	00
(Greece) Alexios Ntanatsidis	10

Round of 64
(Israel) Sagi Muki	10
(Kazakhstan) Ruslan Mussayev	00
(Sweden) Robin Pacek	00
(Hungary) Attila Ungvári	10
(Iceland) Iura Sveinbjörn	00
(United States) Jack Hatton	10
(Democratic Republic of the Congo) Kalonji Mbuyi	00
(Kyrgyzstan) Vladimir Zoloev	11
(Japan) Sotaro Fujiwara	00
(Uzbekistan) Sharofiddin Boltaboev	01
(Poland) Damian Szwarnowiecki	00
(Austria) Shamil Borchashvili	10
(Australia) Eoin Coughlan	00
(Germany) Alexander Wieczerzak	11
(Albania) Marco Maddaloni	00
(Greece) Alexios Ntanatsidis	10

Round of 32
(Israel) Sagi Muki	11
(Hungary) Attila Ungvári	00
(United States) Jack Hatton	00
(Kyrgyzstan) Vladimir Zoloev	10
(Uzbekistan) Sharofiddin Boltaboev	10
(Austria) Shamil Borchashvili	00
(Germany) Alexander Wieczerzak	00
(Greece) Alexios Ntanatsidis	01

Round of 16
(Israel) Sagi Muki	10
(Kyrgyzstan) Vladimir Zoloev	00
(Uzbekistan) Sharofiddin Boltaboev	10
(Greece) Alexios Ntanatsidis	00

Quarterfinals
(Israel) Sagi Muki	10
(Uzbekistan) Sharofiddin Boltaboev	00

=== Pool D ===
First round
(Togo) Kouami Sacha Denanyoh	00
(Dominican Republic) Medickson del Orbe	10
(Portugal) Anri Egutidze	10
(Argentina) Emmanuel Lucenti	00
(Samoa) Peniamina Percival	00
(Georgia (country)) Luka Maisuradze	10
(Kuwait) Abdullah Al-Khuzam	00
(Belgium) Sami Chouchi	10

Round of 64
(Netherlands) Frank de Wit	00
(Dominican Republic) Medickson del Orbe	10
(Egypt) Mohamed Abdelaal	10
(Afghanistan) Muhammad Sarwai	00
(Brazil) Eduardo Santos	01
(Portugal) Anri Egutidze	00
(Mexico) Jesús Torres	00
(Canada) Étienne Briand	11
(Turkey) Vedat Albayrak	00
(Georgia (country)) Luka Maisuradze	10
(Mongolia) Otgonbaataryn Uuganbaatar	10
(Madagascar) Fetra Ratsimiziva	00
(Italy) Christian Parlati	00
(Belgium) Sami Chouchi	10
(Tanzania) Mansab Abdulla	00
(Puerto Rico) Adrián Gandía	10

Round of 32
(Dominican Republic) Medickson del Orbe	00
(Egypt) Mohamed Abdelaal	11
(Brazil) Eduardo Santos	00
(Canada) Étienne Briand	10
(Georgia (country)) Luka Maisuradze	01
(Mongolia) Otgonbaataryn Uuganbaatar	00
(Belgium) Sami Chouchi	01
(Puerto Rico) Adrián Gandía	00

Round of 16
(Egypt) Mohamed Abdelaal	10
(Canada) Étienne Briand	00
(Georgia (country)) Luka Maisuradze	10
(Belgium) Sami Chouchi	00

Quarterfinals
(Egypt) Mohamed Abdelaal	10
(Georgia (country)) Luka Maisuradze	00

== Prize money ==
The sums listed bring the total prizes awarded to 57,000$ for the individual event.

Medal	Total	Judoka	Coach
Gold	26,000$	20,800$	5,200$
Silver	15,000$	12,000$	3,000$
Bronze	8,000$	6,400$	1,600$
