= 2021 World Judo Championships – Men's 81 kg =

Judo competition

Judo Men's 81 kg at the 2021 World Judo Championships
- Venue: László Papp Budapest Sports Arena
- Location: Budapest, Hungary
- Date: 9 June
- Competitors: 77 from 59 nations
- Total prize money: 57,000€

Medalists
gold medal	Matthias Casse (1st title)	Belgium
silver medal	Tato Grigalashvili	Georgia
bronze medal	Frank de Wit	Netherlands
bronze medal	Anri Egutidze	Portugal

Competition at external databases
- Links: IJF • JudoInside

The Men's 81 kg competition at the 2021 World Judo Championships was held on 9 June 2021.

== Results ==
=== Finals ===
Semi-finals
(Belgium) Matthias Casse	01
(Uzbekistan) Sharofiddin Boltaboev	00
(Georgia (country)) Tato Grigalashvili	10
(Netherlands) Frank de Wit	00

Final
(Belgium) Matthias Casse	10
(Georgia (country)) Tato Grigalashvili	00

=== Repechage ===
Repechage
(Japan) Sotaro Fujiwara	01
(Mongolia) Saeid Mollaei	00

Third place
(Japan) Sotaro Fujiwara	00
(Netherlands) Frank de Wit	10

Repechage
(Belgium) Sami Chouchi	00
(Portugal) Anri Egutidze	10

Third place
(Portugal) Anri Egutidze	01
(Uzbekistan) Sharofiddin Boltaboev	00

=== Pool A ===
First round
(Italy) Antonio Esposito	00
(Ukraine) Hievorh Manukian	11
(South Korea) Lee Sung-ho	10
(Iceland) Sveinbjörn Iura	00
Tareq Jamal	00
(Argentina) Emmanuel Lucenti	10
(Cameroon) Lea-Victor Moutbeka	00
(Serbia) Jovan Niškanović	01

Second round
(Belgium) Matthias Casse	10
(Ukraine) Hievorh Manukian	00
(Democratic Republic of the Congo) Cedrick Kalonga	00
(Hungary) Benedek Tóth	10
(Jordan) Baker Al-Zidaneen	00
(Brazil) Eduardo Santos	10
(South Korea) Lee Sung-ho	10
(Spain) José Mendiola	00
Aslan Lappinagov	10
(Argentina) Emmanuel Lucenti	00
(Peru) Luis Ángeles	01
(Finland) Oskari Mäkinen	00
(Serbia) Jovan Niškanović	10
(Belarus) Yunus Bekmurzaev	01
(Japan) Sotaro Fujiwara	10
(Germany) Alexander Wieczerzak	00

Third round
(Belgium) Matthias Casse	10
(Hungary) Benedek Tóth	00
(Brazil) Eduardo Santos	01
(South Korea) Lee Sung-ho	00
Aslan Lappinagov	10
(Peru) Luis Ángeles	00
(Serbia) Jovan Niškanović	00
(Japan) Sotaro Fujiwara	10

Fourth round
(Belgium) Matthias Casse	10
(Brazil) Eduardo Santos	00
Aslan Lappinagov	00
(Japan) Sotaro Fujiwara	10

Quarterfinals
(Belgium) Matthias Casse	10
(Japan) Sotaro Fujiwara	00

=== Pool B ===
First round
(Egypt) Abdelrahman Mohamed	10
(Montenegro) Nikola Gušić	00
(Gabon) Terence Kouamba	00
(Azerbaijan) Zelim Tckaev	10
(Canada) Etienne Briand	10
(Uruguay) Alain Aprahamian	00

Second round
(Mongolia) Saeid Mollaei	11
(Egypt) Abdelrahman Mohamed	00
(Israel) Din Gemer	10
(Greece) Athanasios Milonelis	01
(Austria) Shamil Borchashvili	01
(Czech Republic) Adam Kopecký	00
(Moldova) Dorin Gotonoaga	10
(Slovakia) Alex Bartó	00
(Uzbekistan) Sharofiddin Boltaboev	10
(Qatar) Khalil Rebahi	00
(Azerbaijan) Zelim Tckaev	10
(Madagascar) Fetra Ratsimiziva	00
(Kyrgyzstan) Asad Masabirov	00
(Canada) Etienne Briand	01
(Georgia (country)) Luka Maisuradze	10
(United States) Arthur Wright	00

Third round
(Mongolia) Saeid Mollaei	10
(Israel) Din Gemer	00
(Austria) Shamil Borchashvili	10
(Moldova) Dorin Gotonoaga	00
(Uzbekistan) Sharofiddin Boltaboev	10
(Azerbaijan) Zelim Tckaev	00
(Canada) Etienne Briand	00
(Georgia (country)) Luka Maisuradze	10

Fourth round
(Mongolia) Saeid Mollaei	10
(Austria) Shamil Borchashvili	00
(Uzbekistan) Sharofiddin Boltaboev	10
(Georgia (country)) Luka Maisuradze	00

Quarterfinals
(Mongolia) Saeid Mollaei	00
(Uzbekistan) Sharofiddin Boltaboev	10

=== Pool C ===
First round
(South Korea) Lee Moon-jin	10
(France) Alpha Djalo	01
(Kazakhstan) Didar Khamza	10
(Lebanon) Nacif Elias	00
(Uruguay) Rodrigo Gamou	01
(Belgium) Sami Chouchi	10

Second round
(Georgia (country)) Tato Grigalashvili	10
(South Korea) Lee Moon-jin	00
(Guam) Joshter Andrew	00
(Sweden) Robin Pacek	10
(Greece) Alexios Ntanatsidis	10
(Tajikistan) Akmal Murodov	00
(Kyrgyzstan) Vladimir Zoloev	10
(United States) Nicholas Delpopolo	00
(Bulgaria) Ivaylo Ivanov	10
(Kazakhstan) Didar Khamza	01
(New Zealand) Elliott Connolly	00
(Azerbaijan) Murad Fatiyev	10
(Puerto Rico) Adrián Gandía	10
(Bosnia and Herzegovina) Božidar Vučurević	00
(Belgium) Sami Chouchi	10
(Kuwait) Abdullah Al-Khuzam	00

Third round
(Georgia (country)) Tato Grigalashvili	01
(Sweden) Robin Pacek	00
(Greece) Alexios Ntanatsidis	10
(Kyrgyzstan) Vladimir Zoloev	00
(Bulgaria) Ivaylo Ivanov	10
(Azerbaijan) Murad Fatiyev	00
(Puerto Rico) Adrián Gandía	00
(Belgium) Sami Chouchi	01

Fourth round
(Georgia (country)) Tato Grigalashvili	10
(Greece) Alexios Ntanatsidis	00
(Bulgaria) Ivaylo Ivanov	00
(Belgium) Sami Chouchi	01

Quarterfinals
(Georgia (country)) Tato Grigalashvili	10
(Belgium) Sami Chouchi	00

=== Pool D ===
First round
(Dominican Republic) Medickson del Orbe	01
(Egypt) Mohamed Abdelaal	00
(Montenegro) Nebojša Gardašević	00
(Portugal) Anri Egutidze	01
(Turkey) Muhammed Koç	10
(Slovenia) Alen Vučina	01

Second round
(Netherlands) Frank de Wit	10
(Serbia) Zebeda Rekhviashvili	00
(Latvia) Nikita Duinov	00
(Morocco) Achraf Moutii	10
(Dominican Republic) Medickson del Orbe	11
(Croatia) Dominik Družeta	01
(Hungary) Attila Ungvári	00
Khasan Khalmurzaev	10
(Germany) Dominic Ressel	01
(Brazil) Guilherme Schimidt	00
(Portugal) Anri Egutidze	11
(Moldova) Nicon Zaboroșciuc	00
(Czech Republic) Jaromír Musil	00
(Spain) Alfonso Urquiza	10
(Barbados) Asa Weithers	00
(Turkey) Muhammed Koç	10

Third round
(Netherlands) Frank de Wit	01
(Morocco) Achraf Moutii	00
(Dominican Republic) Medickson del Orbe	01
Khasan Khalmurzaev	00
(Germany) Dominic Ressel	00
(Portugal) Anri Egutidze	10
(Spain) Alfonso Urquiza	10
(Turkey) Muhammed Koç	00

Fourth round
(Netherlands) Frank de Wit	10
(Dominican Republic) Medickson del Orbe	00
(Portugal) Anri Egutidze	10
(Spain) Alfonso Urquiza	00

Quarterfinals
(Netherlands) Frank de Wit	11
(Portugal) Anri Egutidze	00

== Prize money ==
The sums listed bring the total prizes awarded to 57,000€ for the individual event.

Medal	Total	Judoka	Coach
Gold	26,000€	20,800€	5,200€
Silver	15,000€	12,000€	3,000€
Bronze	8,000€	6,400€	1,600€
