= 2018 World Judo Championships – Men's 81 kg =

Judo competition

Judo Men's 81 kg at the 2018 World Judo Championships
- Venue: National Gymnastics Arena
- Location: Baku, Azerbaijan
- Dates: 23 September
- Competitors: 65 from 55 nations
- Total prize money: 57,000€

Medalists
gold medal	Saeid Mollaei (1st title)	Iran
silver medal	Sotaro Fujiwara	Japan
bronze medal	Alexander Wieczerzak	Germany
bronze medal	Vedat Albayrak	Turkey

Competition at external databases
- Links: IJF • JudoInside

The Men's 81 kg competition at the 2018 World Judo Championships was held on 23 September 2018.

== Results ==
=== Finals ===
Semi-finals
(Iran) Saeid Mollaei	01
(Turkey) Vedat Albayrak	00
(Japan) Sotaro Fujiwara	10
(Germany) Dominic Ressel	00

Final
(Iran) Saeid Mollaei	10
(Japan) Sotaro Fujiwara	01

=== Repechage ===
Repechage
(Belgium) Matthias Casse	00
(Germany) Alexander Wieczerzak	01

Third place
(Germany) Alexander Wieczerzak	01
(Germany) Dominic Ressel	00

Repechage
(Poland) Damian Szwarnowiecki	10
(Russia) Khasan Khalmurzaev	00

Third place
(Poland) Damian Szwarnowiecki	00
(Turkey) Vedat Albayrak	10

=== Pool A ===
First round
(Iran) Saeid Mollaei	10
(Canada) Etienne Briand	00
(Democratic Republic of the Congo) Cedrick Kalonga	01
(Iceland) Iura Sveinbjörn	10
(Portugal) Anri Egutidze	01
(Georgia (country)) Zebeda Rekhviashvili	00
(Kazakhstan) Aziz Kalkamanuly	00
(South Korea) Lee Seung-su	10
(Belgium) Matthias Casse	10
(Gabon) Terence Kouamba	00
(Slovakia) Filip Štancel	10
(Costa Rica) David Guillen	00
(Australia) Eoin Coughlan	00
(Argentina) Emmanuel Lucenti	10
(Tajikistan) Akmal Murodov	10
(Lebanon) Steven Azar	00

Second round
(Iran) Saeid Mollaei	10
(Iceland) Iura Sveinbjörn	00
(Portugal) Anri Egutidze	01
(South Korea) Lee Seung-su	00
(Belgium) Matthias Casse	10
(Slovakia) Filip Štancel	00
(Argentina) Emmanuel Lucenti	00
(Tajikistan) Akmal Murodov	11

Third round
(Iran) Saeid Mollaei	10
(Portugal) Anri Egutidze	00
(Belgium) Matthias Casse	10
(Tajikistan) Akmal Murodov	00

Quarterfinals
(Iran) Saeid Mollaei	01
(Belgium) Matthias Casse	00

=== Pool B ===
First round
(Mongolia) Otgonbaataryn Uuganbaatar	00
(Brazil) Eduardo Santos	01
(Greece) Alexios Ntanatsidis	01
(Moldova) Dorin Gotonoaga	00
(United Kingdom) Stuart McWatt	00
(Germany) Alexander Wieczerzak	11
(Bulgaria) Ivaylo Ivanov	00
(Italy) Antonio Esposito	10
(Russia) Aslan Lappinagov	10
(Cyprus) Phedias Konnaris	00
(Tunisia) Abdelaziz Ben Ammar	00
(Czech Republic) Jaromír Musil	01
(Turkey) Vedat Albayrak	10
(Montenegro) Srđan Mrvaljević	00

Second round
(Brazil) Eduardo Santos	01
(Greece) Alexios Ntanatsidis	00
(Germany) Alexander Wieczerzak	01
(Italy) Antonio Esposito	00
(Russia) Aslan Lappinagov	11
(Czech Republic) Jaromír Musil	00
(Luxembourg) Bilgee Bayanaa	00
(Turkey) Vedat Albayrak	10

Third round
(Brazil) Eduardo Santos	00
(Germany) Alexander Wieczerzak	01
(Russia) Aslan Lappinagov	00
(Turkey) Vedat Albayrak	10

Quarterfinals
(Germany) Alexander Wieczerzak	00
(Turkey) Vedat Albayrak	10

=== Pool C ===
First round
(Netherlands) Frank de Wit	00
(Dominican Republic) Medickson del Orbe	10
(Estonia) Kristjan Toniste	10
(Uruguay) Alain Aprahamian	00
(Egypt) Mohamed Abdelaal	00
(Spain) Alfonso Urquiza	01
(Guam) Joshter Andrew	00
(Poland) Damian Szwarnowiecki	10
(Japan) Sotaro Fujiwara	10
(Kyrgyzstan) Vladimir Zoloev	00
(Montenegro) Nebojša Gardašević	00
(France) Alpha Djalo	10
(Belgium) Sami Chouchi	10
(Togo) Kouami Sacha Denanyoh	00
(China) Nai Rigaqi	00
(Turkey) İlker Güldüren	10

Second round
(Dominican Republic) Medickson del Orbe	00
(Estonia) Kristjan Toniste	10
(Spain) Alfonso Urquiza	00
(Poland) Damian Szwarnowiecki	10
(Japan) Sotaro Fujiwara	01
(France) Alpha Djalo	00
(Belgium) Sami Chouchi	10
(Turkey) İlker Güldüren	00

Third round
(Estonia) Kristjan Toniste	00
(Poland) Damian Szwarnowiecki	01
(Japan) Sotaro Fujiwara	01
(Belgium) Sami Chouchi	00

Quarterfinals
(Poland) Damian Szwarnowiecki	00
(Japan) Sotaro Fujiwara	10

=== Pool D ===
Preliminary round fights

	Score	
Baker Al-Zidaneen (Jordan)	10–00	(Burundi) Samuel Kwitonda

First round
(Russia) Khasan Khalmurzaev	01
(Sweden) Robin Pacek	00
(Cameroon) Willy Ngouozeu	00
(Kazakhstan) Didar Khamza	10
(Brazil) Victor Penalber	10
(Morocco) Achraf Moutii	00
(Uzbekistan) Sharofiddin Boltaboev	10
(Jordan) Baker Al-Zidaneen	00
(Germany) Dominic Ressel	10
(Czech Republic) Ivan Petr	00
(Argentina) Tomás Morales	10
(Zambia) Andrew Kaswanga	00
(Hungary) Attila Ungvári	00
(Israel) Sagi Muki	10
(United States) Jack Hatton	01
(Puerto Rico) Adrián Gandía	00

Second round
(Russia) Khasan Khalmurzaev	01
(Kazakhstan) Didar Khamza	00
(Brazil) Victor Penalber	00
(Uzbekistan) Sharofiddin Boltaboev	11
(Germany) Dominic Ressel	10
(Argentina) Tomás Morales	00
(Israel) Sagi Muki	11
(United States) Jack Hatton	00

Third round
(Russia) Khasan Khalmurzaev	10
(Uzbekistan) Sharofiddin Boltaboev	00
(Germany) Dominic Ressel	10
(Israel) Sagi Muki	00

Quarterfinals
(Russia) Khasan Khalmurzaev	00
(Germany) Dominic Ressel	01

== Prize money ==
The sums listed bring the total prizes awarded to €57,000 for the individual event.

Medal	Total	Judoka	Coach
Gold	€26,000	€20,800	€5,200
Silver	€15,000	€12,000	€3,000
Bronze	€8,000	€6,400	€1,600
