= 2020 European Judo Championships – Men's 81 kg =

Judo competition

Judo Men's 81 kg at the 2020 European Judo Championships
- Venue: O2 Arena
- Location: Prague, Czech Republic
- Date: 20 November
- Competitors: 34 from 23 nations

Medalists
gold medal	Tato Grigalashvili (1st title)	Georgia
silver medal	Ivaylo Ivanov	Bulgaria
bronze medal	Luka Maisuradze	Georgia
bronze medal	Matthias Casse	Belgium

Competition at external databases
- Links: IJF • JudoInside

The men's 81 kg competition at the 2020 European Judo Championships was held on 20 November at the O2 Arena.

== Results ==
=== Finals ===
Semifinals
Matthias Casse (BEL)	00
Tato Grigalashvili (GEO)	01
Ivaylo Ivanov (BUL)	10
Frank de Wit (NED)	00

Final
Tato Grigalashvili (GEO)	10
Ivaylo Ivanov (BUL)	00

=== Repechage ===
Repechage
Murad Fatiyev (AZE)	00
Luka Maisuradze (GEO)	01

Third place
Luka Maisuradze (GEO)	11
Frank de Wit (NED)	00

Repechage
Vedat Albayrak (TUR)	00
Sami Chouchi (BEL)	10

Third place
Sami Chouchi (BEL)	00
Matthias Casse (BEL)	10

=== Pool A ===
Round of 64
Murad Fatiyev (AZE)	10
Jaromír Musil (CZE)	00

Round of 32
Matthias Casse (BEL)	10
Nikola Gardašević (MNE)	00
Muhammed Koç (TUR)	01
Alex Barto (SVK)	00
Anri Egutidze (POR)	00
Murad Fatiyev (AZE)	10
Dominik Družeta (CRO)	01
Wachid Borchashvili (AUT)	00

Round of 16
Matthias Casse (BEL)	01
Muhammed Koç (TUR)	00
Murad Fatiyev (AZE)	10
Dominik Družeta (CRO)	00

Quarterfinals
Matthias Casse (BEL)	11
Murad Fatiyev (AZE)	00

=== Pool B ===
Round of 64

Round of 32
Tato Grigalashvili (GEO)	01
Christian Parlati (ITA)	00
Robin Pacek (SWE)	00
Theodoros Demourtsidis (GRE)	10
Luka Maisuradze (GEO)	01
Nicon Zaboroșciuc (MDA)	00
Damian Szwarnowiecki (POL)	00
Artem Bubyr (UKR)	10

Round of 16
Tato Grigalashvili (GEO)	10
Theodoros Demourtsidis (GRE)	00
Luka Maisuradze (GEO)	10
Artem Bubyr (UKR)	00

Quarterfinals
Tato Grigalashvili (GEO)	01
Luka Maisuradze (GEO)	00

=== Pool C ===
Round of 64

Round of 32
Vedat Albayrak (TUR)	10
Damian Stępień (POL)	00
Dorin Gotonoaga (MDA)	00
Shamil Borchashvili (AUT)	01
Ivaylo Ivanov (BUL)	10
Nicolas Chilard (FRA)	00
Marcel Cercea (ROU)	01
Sveinbjörn Iura (ISL)	00

Round of 16
Vedat Albayrak (TUR)	01
Shamil Borchashvili (AUT)	00
Ivaylo Ivanov (BUL)	10
Marcel Cercea (ROU)	00

Quarterfinals
Vedat Albayrak (TUR)	00
Ivaylo Ivanov (BUL)	10

=== Pool D ===
Round of 64
Sami Chouchi (BEL)	10
Adam Kopecký (CZE)	00

Round of 32
Frank de Wit (NED)	01
João Martinho (POR)	00
Antonio Esposito (ITA)	01
Tim Gramkow (GER)	00
Alexios Ntanatsidis (GRE)	00
Sami Chouchi (BEL)	10
Nebojša Gardašević (MNE)	00
Benedek Tóth (HUN)	01

Round of 16
Frank de Wit (NED)	10
Antonio Esposito (ITA)	00
Sami Chouchi (BEL)	11
Benedek Tóth (HUN)	00

Quarterfinals
Frank de Wit (NED)	01
Sami Chouchi (BEL)	00
