= 2021 European Judo Championships – Men's 81 kg =

Judo Men's 81 kg at the 2021 European Judo Championships
- Venue: Altice Arena
- Location: Lisbon, Portugal
- Date: 17 April
- Competitors: 39 from 26 nations

Medalists
gold medal	Vedat Albayrak (1st title)	Turkey
silver medal	Matthias Casse	Belgium
bronze medal	Christian Parlati	Italy
bronze medal	Sagi Muki	Israel

Competition at external databases
- Links: IJF • JudoInside

The men's 81 kg competition at the 2021 European Judo Championships was held on 17 April at the Altice Arena.

== Results ==
=== Finals ===
Semifinals
Matthias Casse (BEL)	10
Ivaylo Ivanov (BUL)	00
Anri Egutidze (POR)	01
Vedat Albayrak (TUR)	11

Final
Matthias Casse (BEL)	00
Vedat Albayrak (TUR)	10

=== Repechage ===
Repechage
Sami Chouchi (BEL)	00
Christian Parlati (ITA)	01

Third place
Christian Parlati (ITA)	10
Anri Egutidze (POR)	00

Repechage
Sagi Muki (ISR)	01
Aslan Lappinagov (RUS)	00

Third place
Sagi Muki (ISR)	01
Ivaylo Ivanov (BUL)	00

=== Pool A ===
Round of 64
Muhammed Koç (TUR)	10
Manuel Rodrigues (POR)	00
Aristos Michael (CYP)	00
Alpha Oumar Djalo (FRA)	10

Round of 32
Matthias Casse (BEL)	10
Muhammed Koç (TUR)	00
Niklas Blöchl (GER)	00
Hidayat Heydarov (AZE)	10
Sami Chouchi (BEL)	10
Alpha Oumar Djalo (FRA)	00
Attila Ungvári (HUN)	01
José Mendiola (ESP)	00

Round of 16
Matthias Casse (BEL)	01
Hidayat Heydarov (AZE)	00
Sami Chouchi (BEL)	10
Attila Ungvári (HUN)	00

Quarterfinals
Matthias Casse (BEL)	10
Sami Chouchi (BEL)	00

=== Pool B ===
Round of 64
Oskari Mäkinen (FIN)	10
Paweł Drzymał (POL)	00
Dominik Družeta (CRO)	00
Zebeda Rekhviashvili (SRB)	01

Round of 32
Ivaylo Ivanov (BUL)	10
Oskari Mäkinen (FIN)	00
Robin Pacek (SWE)	10
Marcel Cercea (ROU)	00
Christian Parlati (ITA)	10
Dorin Gotonoaga (MDA)	00
Jaromír Musil (CZE)	00
Zebeda Rekhviashvili (SRB)	10

Round of 16
Ivaylo Ivanov (BUL)	10
Robin Pacek (SWE)	00
Christian Parlati (ITA)	10
Zebeda Rekhviashvili (SRB)	00

Quarterfinals
Ivaylo Ivanov (BUL)	10
Christian Parlati (ITA)	00

=== Pool C ===
Round of 64
Benedek Tóth (HUN)	00
Shamil Borchashvili (AUT)	10

Round of 32
Sagi Muki (ISR)	10
Árni Lund (ISL)	00
Alen Vučina (SLO)	00
Shamil Borchashvili (AUT)	10
Khasan Khalmurzaev (RUS)	10
Alexander Wieczerzak (GER)	00
Antonio Esposito (ITA)	00
Anri Egutidze (POR)	10

Round of 16
Sagi Muki (ISR)	01
Shamil Borchashvili (AUT)	00
Khasan Khalmurzaev (RUS)	00
Anri Egutidze (POR)	10

Quarterfinals
Sagi Muki (ISR)	00
Anri Egutidze (POR)	10

=== Pool D ===
Round of 64
Aku Laakkonen (FIN)	00
Filip Štancel (SVK)	10
Cătălin Marian (MDA)	01
Alfonso Urquiza (ESP)	10

Round of 32
Vedat Albayrak (TUR)	10
Murad Fatiyev (AZE)	00
Nicolas Chilard (FRA)	01
Filip Štancel (SVK)	00
Aslan Lappinagov (RUS)	10
Alfonso Urquiza (ESP)	00
Adam Kopecký (CZE)	11
Nikola Gardašević (MNE)	00

Round of 16
Vedat Albayrak (TUR)	10
Nicolas Chilard (FRA)	00
Aslan Lappinagov (RUS)	10
Adam Kopecký (CZE)	00

Quarterfinals
Vedat Albayrak (TUR)	10
Aslan Lappinagov (RUS)	00
