= 2022 World Judo Championships – Men's 81 kg =

Judo competition

Judo Men's 81 kg at the 2022 World Judo Championships
- Venue: Humo Ice Dome
- Location: Tashkent, Uzbekistan
- Date: 9 October
- Competitors: 47 from 38 nations
- Total prize money: €57,000

Medalists
gold medal	Tato Grigalashvili (1st title)	Georgia
silver medal	Matthias Casse	Belgium
bronze medal	Takanori Nagase	Japan
bronze medal	Shamil Borchashvili	Austria

Competition at external databases
- Links: IJF • JudoInside

The Men's 81 kg event at the 2022 World Judo Championships was held at the Humo Ice Dome arena in Tashkent, Uzbekistan on 9 October 2022.

== Results ==
=== Finals ===
Semi-finals
(Georgia (country)) Tato Grigalashvili	10
(Azerbaijan) Saeid Mollaei	00
(Belgium) Matthias Casse	10
(Japan) Sotaro Fujiwara	01

Final
(Georgia (country)) Tato Grigalashvili	01
(Belgium) Matthias Casse	00

=== Repechage ===
Repechage
(Japan) Takanori Nagase	01
(South Korea) Lee Joon-hwan	00
(Austria) Shamil Borchashvili	10
(Hungary) Attila Ungvári	00

Bronze medal
(Japan) Takanori Nagase	10
(Japan) Sotaro Fujiwara	00
(Austria) Shamil Borchashvili	11
(Azerbaijan) Saeid Mollaei	00

=== Pool A ===
First round
(France) Alpha Oumar Djalo	10
(Poland) Paweł Drzymał	00
(Dominican Republic) Medickson del Orbe	01
(Germany) Dominic Ressel	00
(Ukraine) Hievorh Manukian	00
(United Arab Emirates) Nugzar Tatalashvili	10
(Egypt) Abdelrahman Abdelghany	11
(Kyrgyzstan) Vladimir Zoloev	01

Round of 32
(Georgia (country)) Tato Grigalashvili	11
(France) Alpha Oumar Djalo	00
(Dominican Republic) Medickson del Orbe	01
(United States) Nicolas Yonezuka	00
(Japan) Takanori Nagase	01
(United Arab Emirates) Nugzar Tatalashvili	00
(Belgium) Sami Chouchi	10
(Egypt) Abdelrahman Abdelghany	00

Round of 16
(Georgia (country)) Tato Grigalashvili	01
(Dominican Republic) Medickson del Orbe	00
(Japan) Takanori Nagase	10
(Belgium) Sami Chouchi	00

Quarter-finals
(Georgia (country)) Tato Grigalashvili	10
(Japan) Takanori Nagase	00

=== Pool B ===
First round
(Italy) Antonio Esposito	00
(Mongolia) Batzayaagiin Erdenebayar	10
(South Korea) Lee Joon-hwan	10
(Greece) Athanasios Mylonelis	00
(Slovakia) Alex Barto	10
(Moldova) Nicon Zaborosciuc	00

Round of 32
(Brazil) Guilherme Schimidt	10
(Mongolia) Batzayaagiin Erdenebayar	01
(Israel) Sagi Muki	00
(South Korea) Lee Joon-hwan	10
(Azerbaijan) Saeid Mollaei	10
(Slovakia) Alex Barto	00
(Tajikistan) Shodmon Rizoev	01
(Morocco) Achraf Moutii	10

Round of 16
(Brazil) Guilherme Schimidt	00
(South Korea) Lee Joon-hwan	10
(Azerbaijan) Saeid Mollaei	10
(Morocco) Achraf Moutii	00

Quarter-finals
(South Korea) Lee Joon-hwan	00
(Azerbaijan) Saeid Mollaei	01

=== Pool C ===
First round
(Azerbaijan) Eljan Hajiyev	00
(United Kingdom) Lachlan Moorhead	10
(Kyrgyzstan) Asad Masabirov	01
(Poland) Sebastian Marcinkiewicz	00
(Spain) Alfonso Urquiza	00
(Czech Republic) Adam Kopecký	01
(Ukraine) Sergii Krivchach	01
(Puerto Rico) Adrián Gandía	00

Round of 32
(Belgium) Matthias Casse	10
(United Kingdom) Lachlan Moorhead	00
(Kyrgyzstan) Asad Masabirov	01
(Algeria) Aghiles-Imad Benazoug	00
(Austria) Shamil Borchashvili	10
(Czech Republic) Adam Kopecký	00
(Ukraine) Sergii Krivchach	10
Fares Badawi	00

Round of 16
(Belgium) Matthias Casse	11
(Kyrgyzstan) Asad Masabirov	00
(Austria) Shamil Borchashvili	10
(Ukraine) Sergii Krivchach	00

Quarter-finals
(Belgium) Matthias Casse	10
(Austria) Shamil Borchashvili	00

=== Pool D ===
First round
(Netherlands) Frank de Wit	10
(Kazakhstan) Abylaikhan Zhubanazar	01
(Moldova) Mihail Latișev	00
(Hungary) Attila Ungvári	01
(Canada) François Gauthier	00
(Tajikistan) Somon Makhmadbekov	01
(Japan) Sotaro Fujiwara	01
(South Korea) Kim Jong-hoon	00

Round of 32
(Turkey) Vedat Albayrak	10
(Netherlands) Frank de Wit	00
(Bahrain) Askerbii Gerbekov	01
(Hungary) Attila Ungvári	11
(Uzbekistan) Sharofiddin Boltaboev	11
(Tajikistan) Somon Makhmadbekov	00
(Portugal) João Fernando	00
(Japan) Sotaro Fujiwara	01

Round of 16
(Turkey) Vedat Albayrak	00
(Hungary) Attila Ungvári	10
(Uzbekistan) Sharofiddin Boltaboev	00
(Japan) Sotaro Fujiwara	01

Quarter-finals
(Hungary) Attila Ungvári	00
(Japan) Sotaro Fujiwara	01
