= 2017 World Judo Championships – Men's 81 kg =

Judo competition

Judo Men's 81 kg at the 2017 World Judo Championships
- Venue: László Papp Budapest Sports Arena
- Location: Budapest, Hungary
- Dates: 31 August
- Competitors: 66 from 54 nations
- Total prize money: 57,000$

Medalists
| gold medal | Alexander Wieczerzak (1st title) | Germany |
| silver medal | Matteo Marconcini | Italy |
| bronze medal | Saeid Mollaei | Iran |
| bronze medal | Khasan Khalmurzaev | Russia |

Competition at external databases
- Links: IJF • JudoInside

The Men's 81 kg competition at the 2017 World Judo Championships was held on 31 August 2017.

== Results ==
=== Finals ===
Semi-finals
(Germany) Alexander Wieczerzak | 01
(Russia) Khasan Khalmurzaev | 00
(Iran) Saeid Mollaei | 00
(Italy) Matteo Marconcini | 01

Final
(Germany) Alexander Wieczerzak | 10
(Italy) Matteo Marconcini | 00

=== Repechage ===
Repechage
(Hungary) László Csoknyai | 01
(Uzbekistan) Davlat Bobonov | 00

Third place
(Hungary) László Csoknyai | 00
(Iran) Saeid Mollaei | 10

Repechage
(Netherlands) Frank de Wit | 00
(Mongolia) Otgonbaataryn Uuganbaatar | 10

Third place
(Mongolia) Otgonbaataryn Uuganbaatar | 01
(Russia) Khasan Khalmurzaev | 02

=== Pool A ===
First round
(Russia) Alan Khubetsov | 10
(Ivory Coast) Cheick Daonne | 00
(Canada) Antoine Valois-Fortier | 00
(Germany) Alexander Wieczerzak | 01
(China) Erihemubatu | 01
(Madagascar) Fetra Ratsimiziva | 00
(Morocco) Achraf Moutii | 11
(Slovakia) Matúš Milichovský | 00
(Argentina) Emmanuel Lucenti | 00
(Hungary) László Csoknyai | 11
(Malawi) Alfred Linguni | 00
(Costa Rica) David Guillen | 10
(Jordan) Baker Al-Zidaneen | 00
(Australia) Eoin Coughlan | 10
(Nauru) Sled Dowabobo | 00
(Czech Republic) Ivaň Petr | 11

Second round
(Russia) Alan Khubetsov | 00
(Germany) Alexander Wieczerzak | 03
(China) Erihemubatu | 11
(Morocco) Achraf Moutii | 00
(Hungary) László Csoknyai | 11
(Costa Rica) David Guillen | 00
(Australia) Eoin Coughlan | 00
(Czech Republic) Ivaň Petr | 01

Third round
(Germany) Alexander Wieczerzak | 01
(China) Erihemubatu | 00
(Hungary) László Csoknyai | 01
(Czech Republic) Ivaň Petr | 00

Quarterfinals
(Germany) Alexander Wieczerzak | 01
(Hungary) László Csoknyai | 00

=== Pool B ===
First round fights

| | Score | |
|---|---|---|
| Davlat Bobonov (Uzbekistan) | 01–00 | (Gabon) Terence Kouamba |

First round
(Brazil) Victor Penalber | 12
(South Africa) Dale Whittaker | 00
(Puerto Rico) Fabián Rodríguez | 00
(Uzbekistan) Davlat Bobonov | 01
(Japan) Takanori Nagase | 10
(Kazakhstan) Aziz Kalkamanuly | 00
(Portugal) Anri Egutidze | 02
(Italy) Antonio Esposito | 00
(Russia) Khasan Khalmurzaev | 01
(Estonia) Kristjan Toniste | 00
(Zambia) Andrew Kaswanga | 00
(El Salvador) Juan Turcios | 12
(Tajikistan) Sadr Boev | 00
(Moldova) Nicon Zaboroșciuc | 10
(United States) Kell Berliner | 00
(Qatar) Oussama Hadjam | 12

Second round
(Brazil) Victor Penalber | 00
(Uzbekistan) Davlat Bobonov | 10
(Japan) Takanori Nagase | 10
(Portugal) Anri Egutidze | 00
(Russia) Khasan Khalmurzaev | 10
(El Salvador) Juan Turcios | 00
(Moldova) Nicon Zaboroșciuc | 02
(Qatar) Oussama Hadjam | 00

Third round
(Uzbekistan) Davlat Bobonov | 10
(Japan) Takanori Nagase | 00
(Russia) Khasan Khalmurzaev | 01
(Moldova) Nicon Zaboroșciuc | 00

Quarterfinals
(Uzbekistan) Davlat Bobonov | 00
(Russia) Khasan Khalmurzaev | 10

=== Pool C ===
First round
(Netherlands) Frank de Wit | 10
(Germany) Benjamin Münnich | 00
(Poland) Damian Szwarnowiecki | 01
(Portugal) João Martinho | 01
(Uruguay) Alain Aprahamian | 00
(Georgia (country)) Zebeda Rekhviashvili | 10
(Croatia) Dominik Družeta | 01
(Romania) Vlad Vişan | 00
(Iran) Saeid Mollaei | 10
(Kyrgyzstan) Vladimir Zoloev | 00
(Greece) Alexios Ntanatsidis | 11
(France) Pape-Doudou Ndiaye | 00
(Cyprus) Kyriakos Nikolaou | 00
(Argentina) Tomás Morales | 10
(Egypt) Mohamed Abdelaal | 10
(Senegal) Saliou Ndiaye | 00

Second round
(Netherlands) Frank de Wit | 01
(Poland) Damian Szwarnowiecki | 00
(Georgia (country)) Zebeda Rekhviashvili | 11
(Croatia) Dominik Družeta | 01
(Iran) Saeid Mollaei | 11
(Greece) Alexios Ntanatsidis | 00
(Argentina) Tomás Morales | 00
(Egypt) Mohamed Abdelaal | 02

Third round
(Netherlands) Frank de Wit | 01
(Georgia (country)) Zebeda Rekhviashvili | 00
(Iran) Saeid Mollaei | 01
(Egypt) Mohamed Abdelaal | 00

Quarterfinals
(Netherlands) Frank de Wit | 00
(Iran) Saeid Mollaei | 10

=== Pool D ===
First round fights

| | Score | |
|---|---|---|
| Gao Haiyuan (China) | 00–10 | (South Korea) Lee Jae-hyung |

First round
(Hungary) Attila Ungvári | 01
(Cuba) Jorge Martínez | 00
(United States) Jack Hatton | 12
(Nepal) Mohan Sunuwar | 00
(Australia) Anthony Kouros | 00
(Belgium) Joachim Bottieau | 01
(Italy) Matteo Marconcini | 01
(Montenegro) Srđan Mrvaljević | 00
(Bulgaria) Ivaylo Ivanov | 10
(New Zealand) Vinay Reddy | 00
(Brazil) Eduardo Yudi Santos | 01
(Canada) Etienne Briand | 00
(Turkey) İlker Güldüren | 00
(Moldova) Dorin Gotonoaga | 10
(Mongolia) Otgonbaataryn Uuganbaatar | 10
(South Korea) Lee Jae-hyung | 00

Second round
(Hungary) Attila Ungvári | 01
(United States) Jack Hatton | 00
(Belgium) Joachim Bottieau | 00
(Italy) Matteo Marconcini | 10
(Bulgaria) Ivaylo Ivanov | 01
(Brazil) Eduardo Yudi Santos | 00
(Moldova) Dorin Gotonoaga | 00
(Mongolia) Otgonbaataryn Uuganbaatar | 02

Third round
(Hungary) Attila Ungvári | 00
(Italy) Matteo Marconcini | 02
(Bulgaria) Ivaylo Ivanov | 00
(Mongolia) Otgonbaataryn Uuganbaatar | 00

Quarterfinals
(Italy) Matteo Marconcini | 11
(Mongolia) Otgonbaataryn Uuganbaatar | 00

== Prize money ==
The sums listed bring the total prizes awarded to 57,000$ for the individual event.

| Medal | Total | Judoka | Coach |
|---|---|---|---|
| Gold | 26,000$ | 20,800$ | 5,200$ |
| Silver | 15,000$ | 12,000$ | 3,000$ |
| Bronze | 8,000$ | 6,400$ | 1,600$ |
