= Judo at the 2018 Asian Games – Men's 81 kg =

Judo competition

Men's 81 kg at the 2018 Asian Games
- Venue: Jakarta Convention Center
- Date: 30 August 2018
- Competitors: 21 from 21 nations

Medalists
gold medal	Didar Khamza	Kazakhstan
silver medal	Saeid Mollaei	Iran
bronze medal	Vladimir Zoloev	Kyrgyzstan
bronze medal	Otgonbaataryn Uuganbaatar	Mongolia

The men's 81 kilograms (Half middleweight) competition at the 2018 Asian Games in Jakarta was held on 30 August at the Jakarta Convention Center Assembly Hall.

== Schedule ==
All times are Western Indonesia Time (UTC+07:00)

Date	Time	Event
Thursday, 30 August 2018	09:00	Elimination round of 32
Thursday, 30 August 2018	09:00	Elimination round of 16
Thursday, 30 August 2018	09:00	Quarterfinals
Thursday, 30 August 2018	09:00	Repechage
Thursday, 30 August 2018	09:00	Semifinals
Thursday, 30 August 2018	16:00	Finals

== Results ==
Legend

- WO — Won by walkover

=== Main bracket ===
==== Final ====
Gold medal contest
Saeid Mollaei (IRI)	01
Didar Khamza (KAZ)	10

==== Top half ====
Elimination round of 32
Chittakon Xayasan (LAO)	00
Gao Haiyuan (CHN)	10
Rajitha Pushpakumara (SRI)	00
Harshdeep Singh Brar (IND)	10

Elimination round of 16
Saeid Mollaei (IRI)	10
Gerard Christopher George (INA)	00
Chang Wei-cheng (TPE)	00
Gao Haiyuan (CHN)	01
Lee Seung-su (KOR)	10
Harshdeep Singh Brar (IND)	00
Vladimir Zoloev (KGZ)	10
Mohamad Kasem (SYR)	00

Quarterfinals
Saeid Mollaei (IRI)	10
Gao Haiyuan (CHN)	00
Lee Seung-su (KOR)	01
Vladimir Zoloev (KGZ)	00

Semifinals
Saeid Mollaei (IRI)	11
Lee Seung-su (KOR)	00

==== Bottom half ====
Elimination round of 32
Akmal Murodov (TJK)	10
Wesam Abu Rmilah (PLE)	00
Mohammad Zaher Sarwari (AFG)	10
Hussein Al-Jarrah (YEM)	00
Hadi Ali (IRQ)
Steven Azar (LBN)	WO

Elimination round of 16
Otgonbaataryn Uuganbaatar (MGL)	10
Akmal Murodov (TJK)	00
Didar Khamza (KAZ)	01
Masayuki Terada (THA)	00
Takeshi Sasaki (JPN)	10
Mohammad Zaher Sarwari (AFG)	00
Sharofiddin Boltaboev (UZB)	01
Steven Azar (LBN)	00

Quarterfinals
Otgonbaataryn Uuganbaatar (MGL)	00
Didar Khamza (KAZ)	10
Takeshi Sasaki (JPN)	10
Sharofiddin Boltaboev (UZB)	00

Semifinals
Didar Khamza (KAZ)	10
Takeshi Sasaki (JPN)	01

=== Repechage ===
Repechage
Gao Haiyuan (CHN)	00
Vladimir Zoloev (KGZ)	11
Otgonbaataryn Uuganbaatar (MGL)	11
Sharofiddin Boltaboev (UZB)	00

Bronze medal contests
Vladimir Zoloev (KGZ)	10
Takeshi Sasaki (JPN)	00
Otgonbaataryn Uuganbaatar (MGL)	01
Lee Seung-su (KOR)	00
