= 2024 European Judo Championships – Men's 81 kg =

Judo competition

Judo Men's 81 kg at the 2024 European Judo Championships
- Venue: Arena Zagreb
- Location: Zagreb, Croatia
- Date: 26 April 2024

Medalists
gold medal	Tato Grigalashvili (3rd title)	Georgia
silver medal	Frank de Wit	Netherlands
bronze medal	Vedat Albayrak	Turkey
bronze medal	Shamil Borchashvili	Austria

Competition at external databases
- Links: IJF • JudoInside

The Men's 81 kg event at the 2024 European Judo Championships was held at the Arena Zagreb in Zagreb, Croatia on 26 April 2024.

== Results ==
=== Finals ===
Semi-finals
(Georgia (country)) Tato Grigalashvili	10
(Italy) Antonio Esposito	00
(Netherlands) Frank de Wit	01 (yellow card)
(Turkey) Vedat Albayrak	00 (yellow card)

Final
(Georgia (country)) Tato Grigalashvili	10
(Netherlands) Frank de Wit	00

=== Repechage ===
Repechage
(Hungary) Attila Ungvári	00
(Israel) Sagi Muki	10 (yellow card)
(Republic of Ireland) Maxim Trigub	00
(Austria) Shamil Borchashvili	10

Bronze medal
(Israel) Sagi Muki	00
(Turkey) Vedat Albayrak	01 (yellow card)
(Austria) Shamil Borchashvili	01
(Italy) Antonio Esposito	00

=== Pool A ===
First round
(France) Alpha Oumar Djalo	11
(Greece) Theodoros Demourtsidis	01
(Austria) Wachid Borchashvili	00
(Moldova) Mihail Latișev	01 (yellow card)
(Spain) Alfonso Urquiza	10
(Croatia) Dominik Rožić	00

Round of 32
(Georgia (country)) Tato Grigalashvili	10
(France) Alpha Oumar Djalo	00
(Moldova) Mihail Latișev	00
(Serbia) Islam Šogenov	11
(Hungary) Attila Ungvári	10 (yellow card)
(United Kingdom) Lachlan Moorhead	00
(Spain) Alfonso Urquiza	10 (yellow card)
(Germany) Timo Cavelius	00 (yellow card)

Round of 16
(Georgia (country)) Tato Grigalashvili	10
(Serbia) Islam Šogenov	00
(Hungary) Attila Ungvári	11
(Spain) Alfonso Urquiza	00

Quarter-finals
(Georgia (country)) Tato Grigalashvili	10 (yellow card)
(Hungary) Attila Ungvári	00

=== Pool B ===
First round
(Czech Republic) Adam Kopecký	00
(Bosnia and Herzegovina) Mustafa Hebib	10
(Portugal) João Fernando	11
(Albania) Jon Vrenozi	00

Round of 32
(Israel) Sagi Muki	10 (yellow card)
(Republic of Ireland) Bearach Gleeson	00 (yellow card)
(Bosnia and Herzegovina) Mustafa Hebib	00
(Ukraine) Mykhailo Svidrak	01
(Italy) Antonio Esposito	10 (yellow card)
(Portugal) João Fernando	00
(Switzerland) Loïc Gerosa	00 (yellow card)
(Cyprus) Odysseas Georgakis	10 (yellow card)

Round of 16
(Israel) Sagi Muki	02
(Ukraine) Mykhailo Svidrak	00
(Italy) Antonio Esposito	01 (yellow card)
(Cyprus) Odysseas Georgakis	00

Quarter-finals
(Israel) Sagi Muki	00
(Italy) Antonio Esposito	10

=== Pool C ===
First round
(Republic of Ireland) Maxim Trigub	10 (yellow card)
(Slovenia) Nace Herkovič	00
(Finland) Oskari Mäkinen	10
(Germany) Dominic Ressel	00 (yellow card)
(Spain) José María Mendiola	10 (yellow card)
(Czech Republic) Petr Mladý	00

Round of 32
(Azerbaijan) Zelim Tckaev	00
(Republic of Ireland) Maxim Trigub	10
(Belgium) Jarne Duyck	00 (yellow card)
(Portugal) Anri Egutidze	01
(Netherlands) Frank de Wit	10 (yellow card)
(Finland) Oskari Mäkinen	00 (yellow card)
(Spain) José María Mendiola	00
(Romania) Adrian Şulcă	10 (yellow card)

Round of 16
(Republic of Ireland) Maxim Trigub	10 (yellow card)
(Portugal) Anri Egutidze	00
(Netherlands) Frank de Wit	11
(Romania) Adrian Şulcă	00

Quarter-finals
(Republic of Ireland) Maxim Trigub	00
(Netherlands) Frank de Wit	01 (yellow card)

=== Pool D ===
First round
(Croatia) Dominik Družeta	01
(Bulgaria) Georgi Gramatikov	00
(Greece) Antoni Kouros	01
(Poland) Paweł Drzymał	10
(Italy) Giacomo Gamba	00
(Switzerland) Aurélien Bonferroni	10 (yellow card)

Round of 32
(Austria) Shamil Borchashvili	01
(Croatia) Dominik Družeta	00
(Poland) Paweł Drzymał	00 (yellow card)
(Moldova) Victor Sterpu	10
(Turkey) Vedat Albayrak	11 (yellow card)
(North Macedonia) Edi Šerifovski	00
(Switzerland) Aurélien Bonferroni	10
Sibghatullah Arab	00

Round of 16
(Austria) Shamil Borchashvili	10
(Moldova) Victor Sterpu	00
(Turkey) Vedat Albayrak	10 (yellow card)
(Switzerland) Aurélien Bonferroni	00

Quarter-finals
(Austria) Shamil Borchashvili	00
(Turkey) Vedat Albayrak	10
