= Judo at the 2020 Summer Olympics – Men's 81 kg =

Judo competition

Men's 81 kg at the Games of the XXXII Olympiad
- Venue: Nippon Budokan
- Date: 27 July 2021
- Competitors: 35 from 35 nations

Medalists
| 1st place, gold medalist(s) | | Takanori Nagase | Japan |
| 2nd place, silver medalist(s) | | Saeid Mollaei | Mongolia |
| 3rd place, bronze medalist(s) | | Shamil Borchashvili | Austria |
| 3rd place, bronze medalist(s) | | Matthias Casse | Belgium |

The men's 81 kg competition in judo at the 2020 Summer Olympics in Tokyo was held on 27 July 2021 at the Nippon Budokan.

== Results ==
=== Finals ===
Semi-finals
1 Matthias Casse (BEL) | 00
Takanori Nagase (JPN) | 01
Shamil Borchashvili (AUT) | 00
6 Saeid Mollaei (MGL) | 10

Gold medal
Takanori Nagase (JPN) | 01
6 Saeid Mollaei (MGL) | 00

=== Repechage ===
Repechage
8 Alan Khubetsov (ROC) | 00
Dominic Ressel (GER) | 10

Bronze medal
Shamil Borchashvili (AUT) | 10
Dominic Ressel (GER) | 00

Repechage
7 Sharofiddin Boltaboev (UZB) | 00
3 Tato Grigalashvili (GEO) | 01

Bronze medal
1 Matthias Casse (BEL) | 10
3 Tato Grigalashvili (GEO) | 00

=== Pool A ===
Round of 64
Robin Pacek (SWE) | 10
Housni Thaoubani (COM) | 00

Round of 32
1 Matthias Casse (BEL) | 11
Adrián Gandía (PUR) | 01
Alain Mikael Aprahamian (URU) | 00
Robin Pacek (SWE) | 10
8 Alan Khubetsov (ROC) | 10
Vladimir Zoloev (KGZ) | 00
Antoine Valois-Fortier (CAN) | 10
Alexios Ntanatsidis (GRE) | 00

Round of 16
1 Matthias Casse (BEL) | 11
Robin Pacek (SWE) | 01
8 Alan Khubetsov (ROC) | 01
Antoine Valois-Fortier (CAN) | 00

Quarter-finals
1 Matthias Casse (BEL) | 10
8 Alan Khubetsov (ROC) | 00

=== Pool B ===
Round of 64
Mohamed Abdelaal (EGY) | 10
Attila Ungvári (HUN) | 00

Round of 32
4 Vedat Albayrak (TUR) | 00
Takanori Nagase (JPN) | 10
Mohamed Abdelaal (EGY) | 00
Christian Parlati (ITA) | 11
5 Frank de Wit (NED) | 10
Peniamina Percival (SAM) | 00
Wesam Abu Rmilah (PLE) | 00
Dominic Ressel (GER) | 10

Round of 16
Takanori Nagase (JPN) | 10
Christian Parlati (ITA) | 00
5 Frank de Wit (NED) | 00
Dominic Ressel (GER) | 01

Quarter-finals
Takanori Nagase (JPN) | 01
Dominic Ressel (GER) | 00

=== Pool C ===
Round of 64

Round of 32
2 Sagi Muki (ISR) | 10
Eduardo Yudy Santos (BRA) | 00
Anri Egutidze (POR) | 00
Shamil Borchashvili (AUT) | 01
7 Sharofiddin Boltaboev (UZB) | 10
Hugo Cumbo (VAN) | 00
Ivaylo Ivanov (BUL) | 10
Emmanuel Lucenti (ARG) | 00

Round of 16
2 Sagi Muki (ISR) | 00
Shamil Borchashvili (AUT) | 01
7 Sharofiddin Boltaboev (UZB) | 01
Ivaylo Ivanov (BUL) | 00

Quarter-finals
Shamil Borchashvili (AUT) | 01
7 Sharofiddin Boltaboev (UZB) | 00

=== Pool D ===
Round of 64
Joshter Andrew (GUM) | 0
Akmal Murodov (TJK) | 10

Round of 32
3 Tato Grigalashvili (GEO) | 11
Akmal Murodov (TJK) | 00
Nacif Elias (LBN) | 00
Lee Sung-ho (KOR) | 10
6 Saeid Mollaei (MGL) | 10
Didar Khamza (KAZ) | 00
~~Frederick Harris (SLE)~~
Murad Fatiyev (AZE) | W/O (Note: Frederick Harris did not pass the official weigh-in and did not take part in the competition.)

Round of 16
3 Tato Grigalashvili (GEO) | 10
Lee Sung-ho (KOR) | 00
6 Saeid Mollaei (MGL) | 01
Murad Fatiyev (AZE) | 00

Quarter-finals
3 Tato Grigalashvili (GEO) | 01
6 Saeid Mollaei (MGL) | 10
