= 2017 European Judo Championships – Men's 81 kg =

Judo competition

Judo Men's 81 kg at the 2017 European Judo Championships
- Venue: Torwar Hall
- Location: Warsaw, Poland
- Date: April 20, 2017
- Competitors: 35 from 23 nations

Medalists
gold medal	Alan Khubetsov (1st title)	Russia
silver medal	Dominic Ressel	Germany
bronze medal	Aslan Lappinagov	Russia
bronze medal	Dominik Družeta	Croatia

Competition at external databases
- Links: IJF • JudoInside

The men's 81 kg competition at the 2017 European Judo Championships in Warsaw were held on 20 April at the Torwar Hall.

== Results ==
=== Finals ===
Semi-finals
Dominic Ressel (GER)	000
Zebeda Rekhviashvili (GEO)	000
Frank de Wit (NED)	000
Alan Khubetsov (RUS)	100

Final
Dominic Ressel (GER)	000
Alan Khubetsov (RUS)	110

=== Repechages ===
Repechage		Bronze medal
Ivaylo Ivanov (BUL)	000
Aslan Lappinagov (RUS)	100	Aslan Lappinagov (RUS)	100
		Frank de Wit (NED)	000

Repechage		Bronze medal
Dominik Družeta (CRO)	010
Nicon Zaboroșciuc (MDA)	000	Dominik Družeta (CRO)	100
		Zebeda Rekhviashvili (GEO)	000

=== Pool A ===
First round
İlker Güldüren (TUR)	100
Matteo Marconcini (ITA)	000

Second round
Ivaylo Ivanov (BUL)	100
Sergii Krivchach (UKR)	010
Matthias Casse (BEL)	010
Dorin Gotonoaga (MDA)	000
Dominic Ressel (GER)	110
İlker Güldüren (TUR)	000
Jakub Kubieniec (POL)	000
João Martinho (POR)	010

Third round
Ivaylo Ivanov (BUL)	010
Matthias Casse (BEL)	000
Dominic Ressel (GER)	110
João Martinho (POR)	000

Quarterfinals
Ivaylo Ivanov (BUL)	000
Dominic Ressel (GER)	010

=== Pool B ===
First round

Second round
Aslan Lappinagov (RUS)	120
Juris Putins (LAT)	000
Ivan Petr (CZE)	000
Pape Doudou Ndiaye (FRA)	100
Attila Ungvári (HUN)	010
Arso Milić (MNE)	000
Zebeda Rekhviashvili (GEO)	100
Vlad Vişan (ROU)	000

Third round
Aslan Lappinagov (RUS)	010
Pape Doudou Ndiaye (FRA)	000
Attila Ungvári (HUN)	010
Zebeda Rekhviashvili (GEO)	100

Quarterfinals
Aslan Lappinagov (RUS)	000
Zebeda Rekhviashvili (GEO)	010

=== Pool C ===
First round
Benjamin Münnich (GER)	010
Baptiste Pierre (FRA)	000

Second round
Frank de Wit (NED)	100
Antonio Esposito (ITA)	000
Elemer Szocs (ROU)	000
Andranik Chaparyan (ARM)	100
László Csoknyai (HUN)	000
Benjamin Münnich (GER)	100
Dominik Družeta (CRO)	110
Filips Mikuckis (LAT)	010

Third round
Frank de Wit (NED)	100
Andranik Chaparyan (ARM)	000
Benjamin Münnich (GER)	000
Dominik Družeta (CRO)	100

Quarterfinals
Frank de Wit (NED)	100
Dominik Družeta (CRO)	000

=== Pool D ===
First round
Sami Chouchi (BEL)	020
Anri Egutidze (POR)	010

Second round
Alan Khubetsov (RUS)	010
Sami Chouchi (BEL)	000
Damian Szwarnowiecki (POL)	110
Bojan Došen (SRB)	000
Rufat Ismayilov (AZE)	110
Kristjan Toniste (EST)	000
Srđan Mrvaljević (MNE)	000
Nicon Zaboroșciuc (MDA)	110

Third round
Alan Khubetsov (RUS)	010
Damian Szwarnowiecki (POL)	000
Rufat Ismayilov (AZE)	010
Nicon Zaboroșciuc (MDA)	100

Quarterfinals
Alan Khubetsov (RUS)	100
Nicon Zaboroșciuc (MDA)	000
