= Jack Hatton =

American judoka (1995–2019)

Personal information
- Nationality: American
- Born: September 20, 1995
- Died: September 24, 2019 (aged 24) Wakefield, Massachusetts, U.S.
- Occupation: Judoka

Sport
- Country: United States
- Sport: Judo
- Weight class: –81 kg

Achievements and titles
- World Champ.: R32 (2017, 2018, 2019)
- Pan American Champ.: (bronze) (2019)
Medal record
Men's judo
Representing United States
Pan American Championships
Bronze medal – third place	2019 Lima	–81 kg
IJF Grand Prix
Silver medal – second place	2018 Antalya	–81 kg
Bronze medal – third place	2017 Zagreb	–81 kg

Profile at external databases
- IJF: 8046
- JudoInside.com: 79564
- Updated on 1 December 2022

Jack Hatton (September 20, 1995 – September 24, 2019) was an American judoka representing the United States. He was known as "Judo Jack". Hatton was a member of the US National Team. Hatton competed in the 2018 and 2017 Senior World Championships in Judo. He competed in the 81 kg division. Hatton was attempting to make the 2020 Olympic Team prior to its cancellation. He was coached by Jimmy Pedro.

On September 24, 2019, Hatton was found dead at his home in Wakefield, Massachusetts, having died by suicide. He left no suicide note. He was 24 years old.
