= Matteo Marconcini =

Italian judoka (born 1989)

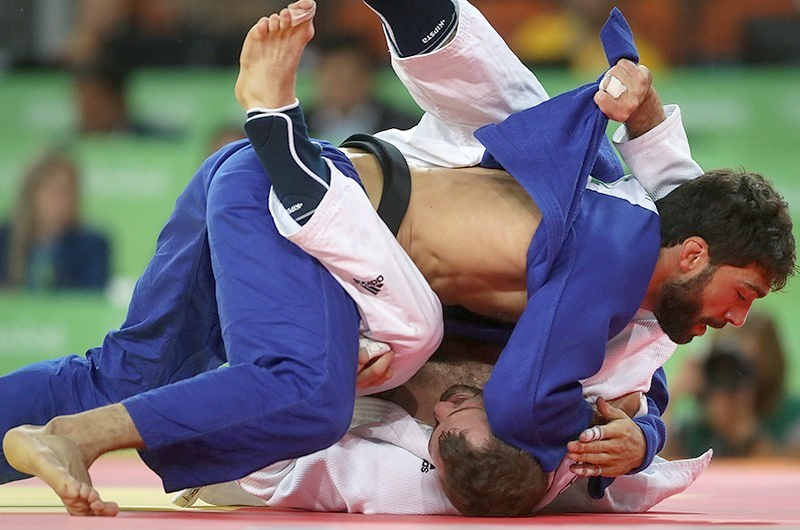
- Marconcini (top) at the 2016 Olympics

Personal information
- Nationality: Italian
- Born: 26 August 1989 (age 36)
- Occupation: Judoka
- Height: 185 cm (6 ft 1 in)

Sport
- Country: Italy
- Sport: Judo
- Weight class: –81 kg
- Club: Carabinieri Sports Centre
- Coached by: Francesco Bruyere (national)

Achievements and titles
- Olympic Games: 5th (2016)
- World Champ.: (silver) (2017)
- European Champ.: R64 (2017)
Medal record
Men's judo
Representing Italy
World Championships
Silver medal – second place	2017 Budapest	‍–‍81 kg
IJF Grand Slam
Bronze medal – third place	2016 Baku	‍–‍81 kg
IJF Grand Prix
Silver medal – second place	2016 Almaty	‍–‍81 kg
Bronze medal – third place	2014 Zagreb	‍–‍81 kg

Profile at external databases
- IJF: 4649
- JudoInside.com: 39519
- Updated on 26 June 2023

Matteo Marconcini (born 26 August 1989) is an Italian judoka. He competed at the 2016 Summer Olympics in the ‍–‍81 kg category, and lost the bronze medal match to Sergiu Toma.

Marconcini is an athlete of the Centro Sportivo Carabinieri.
