= Judo at the 2026 Asian Games – Men's 81 kg =

Judo competition

Judo Men's 81 kg at the 2026 Asian Games
- Venue: Aichi International Arena
- Location: Nagoya, Japan

Medalists
gold medal	Sotaro Fujiwara	Japan
silver medal	Adilet Almat	Kazakhstan
bronze medal	Lee Joon-hwan	South Korea
bronze medal	Abubakr Sherov	Tajikistan

The men's 81 kilograms (half middleweight) competition in Judo at the 2026 Asian Games in Nagoya was held on 1 October 2026 at the Aichi International Arena.

== Schedule ==
All times are Japan Standard Time (UTC+09:00)

Date	Time	Event
Thursday, 1 October 2026	11:00	Elimination round of 32
Thursday, 1 October 2026	11:00	Elimination round of 16
Thursday, 1 October 2026	11:00	Quarterfinals
Thursday, 1 October 2026	11:00	Repechage
Thursday, 1 October 2026	11:00	Semifinals
Thursday, 1 October 2026	17:00	Finals

== Results ==
=== Main bracket ===
==== Final ====
Final
Sotaro Fujiwara (JPN)	100
Adilet Almat (KAZ)	000

==== Top half ====
Round of 32

Round of 16
Lee Joon-hwan (KOR)	100
Soulisay Sayasan (LAO)	000 (yellow card)
Lee Kwok Wing (HKG)	101 (yellow card)
Photchara Kanchu (THA)	000
Sotaro Fujiwara (JPN)	100
Amir Daniel Abdul Majeed (MAS)	010
Askerbii Gerbekov (BRN)	100
Amirul Islam (BAN)	000

Quarter-finals
Lee Joon-hwan (KOR)	011
Lee Kwok Wing (HKG)	000
Sotaro Fujiwara (JPN)	001
Askerbii Gerbekov (BRN)	000 (yellow card)

Semi-finals
Lee Joon-hwan (KOR)	000 (yellow card)
Sotaro Fujiwara (JPN)	010

==== Bottom half ====
Round of 32
Abubakr Sherov (TJK)	101
Muayad Thwaib (PLE)	000

Round of 16
Arslonbek Tojiev (UZB)	001 (yellow card)
Abubakr Sherov (TJK)	100 (yellow card)
Georgii Elbakiav (UAE)	001
Elyas Parhizgar (IRI)	100
Adilet Almat (KAZ)	100
Tegin Almazjan Uulu (KGZ)	001
Oyunchimegiin Shinebayar (MGL)	001
Shi Zhenyu (CHN)	000

Quarter-finals
Abubakr Sherov (TJK)	002
Elyas Parhizgar (IRI)	001
Adilet Almat (KAZ)	010
Oyunchimegiin Shinebayar (MGL)	000

Semi-finals
Abubakr Sherov (TJK)	000 (yellow card)
Adilet Almat (KAZ)	010

=== Repechage ===
Repechage
Lee Kwok Wing (HKG)	000
Askerbii Gerbekov (BRN)	100 (yellow card)
Elyas Parhizgar (IRI)	001
Oyunchimegiin Shinebayar (MGL)	000 (yellow card)

Bronze medal
Askerbii Gerbekov (BRN)	000
Abubakr Sherov (TJK)	011 (yellow card)
Elyas Parhizgar (IRI)	000
Lee Joon-hwan (KOR)	100 (yellow card)
