= Alan Khubetsov =

Russian judoka (born 1993)

Alan Khubetsov Алан Хубецов
Personal information
- Full name: Alan Dzhemalovich Khubetsov
- Nationality: Russian
- Born: 26 June 1993 (age 33) Vladikavkaz, North Ossetia-Alania, Russia
- Occupation: Judoka

Sport
- Country: Russia
- Sport: Judo
- Weight class: –81 kg

Achievements and titles
- Olympic Games: 7th (2020)
- World Champ.: R32 (2017)
- European Champ.: (gold) (2017)
Medal record
Men's judo
Representing Individual Neutral Athletes
IJF Grand Slam
Bronze medal – third place	2023 Ulaanbaatar	‍–‍81 kg
Representing Russia
European Games
Gold medal – first place	2019 Minsk	Mixed team
European Championships
Gold medal – first place	2017 Warsaw	‍–‍81 kg
World Masters
Bronze medal – third place	2017 Saint Petersburg	‍–‍81 kg
Bronze medal – third place	2019 Qingdao	‍–‍81 kg
IJF Grand Slam
Gold medal – first place	2014 Baku	‍–‍81 kg
Silver medal – second place	2014 Tyumen	‍–‍81 kg
Silver medal – second place	2021 Kazan	‍–‍81 kg
Silver medal – second place	2021 Abu Dhabi	‍–‍81 kg
Bronze medal – third place	2013 Baku	‍–‍81 kg
Bronze medal – third place	2016 Tyumen	‍–‍81 kg
Bronze medal – third place	2017 Abu Dhabi	‍–‍81 kg
Bronze medal – third place	2019 Paris	‍–‍81 kg
Bronze medal – third place	2019 Brasilia	‍–‍81 kg
IJF Grand Prix
Gold medal – first place	2014 Astana	‍–‍81 kg
Gold medal – first place	2015 Tbilisi	‍–‍81 kg
Gold medal – first place	2016 Tbilisi	‍–‍81 kg
Gold medal – first place	2016 Zagreb	‍–‍81 kg
Gold medal – first place	2018 Budapest	‍–‍81 kg
Silver medal – second place	2017 Tbilisi	‍–‍81 kg
Silver medal – second place	2017 Hohhot	‍–‍81 kg
Bronze medal – third place	2018 Hohhot	‍–‍81 kg
European U23 Championships
Gold medal – first place	2012 Prague	‍–‍81 kg
Military World Games
Gold medal – first place	2019 Wuhan	Men's team

Profile at external databases
- IJF: 11113
- JudoInside.com: 57194
- Updated on 24 June 2023

Alan Dzhemalovich Khubetsov (Russian: Алан Джемалович Хубецов; born 26 June 1993) is a Russian judoka of Ossetian ethnicity. He is the 2017 European gold medalist in the ‍–‍81 kg division. Khubestov is also a lieutenant in the Russian army.
