= Li Chang-su =

South Korean judoka from North Korea (1967–2026)

Li Chang-Su (Korean: 이창수; July 12, 1967 – January 20, 2026) was a North Korean judoka, and defector to South Korea.

== Life and career ==
Li Chang-Su was born in Pyongyang, North Korea on July 12, 1967. He won bronze medals during the 1989 World Judo Championships, and the 1988 Asian Judo Championships. During the 1990 Asian Games, he won the Silver medal despite suffering a rib injury. Due to the loss against a South Korean athlete, Chang-Su reported being forced into hard labor by the North Korean regime.

During an international judo tournament held in Bulgaria, he secretly delivered a note to South Korean athletes expressing his intention to defect from North Korea. While using an international train passing through West Berlin, he escaped, eventually settling in South Korea.

Li died from a heart attack on January 20, 2026, at the age of 58.

== Family ==
In 1992, he married to Chen Ling-chen (陳玲真), a Taiwanese judoka that represent Chinese Taipei, both have three sons. His second son Lee Moon-jin, also became a judoka that represent South Korea.
