= Lee Moon-jin =

South Korean judoka (born 1995)

Personal information
- Born: 4 August 1995 (age 30) South Korea
- Occupation: Judoka

Sport
- Country: South Korea
- Sport: Judo
- Weight class: ‍–‍81 kg

Achievements and titles
- World Champ.: R64 (2021)
- Asian Champ.: (silver) (2021)
Medal record
Men's judo
Representing South Korea
Asian Championships
Silver medal – second place	2021 Bishkek	‍–‍81 kg
Bronze medal – third place	2017 Hong Kong	‍–‍81 kg
IJF Grand Slam
Gold medal – first place	2019 Abu Dhabi	‍–‍81 kg
Asian Junior Championships
Bronze medal – third place	2015 Bangkok	‍–‍81 kg
Summer Universiade
Silver medal – second place	2019 Naples	‍–‍81 kg

Profile at external databases
- IJF: 8146
- JudoInside.com: 79578
- Updated on 8 January 2023

Lee Moon-jin (Korean: 이문진; born 4 August 1995) is a South Korean judoka. He is the second son of Li Chang-su, the judoka who defected from North Korea.

Lee is the gold medalist from the 2019 Judo Grand Slam Abu Dhabi in the ‍–‍81 kg category.
