= Rufat Ismayilov =

Azaerbaijani judoka (born 1996)

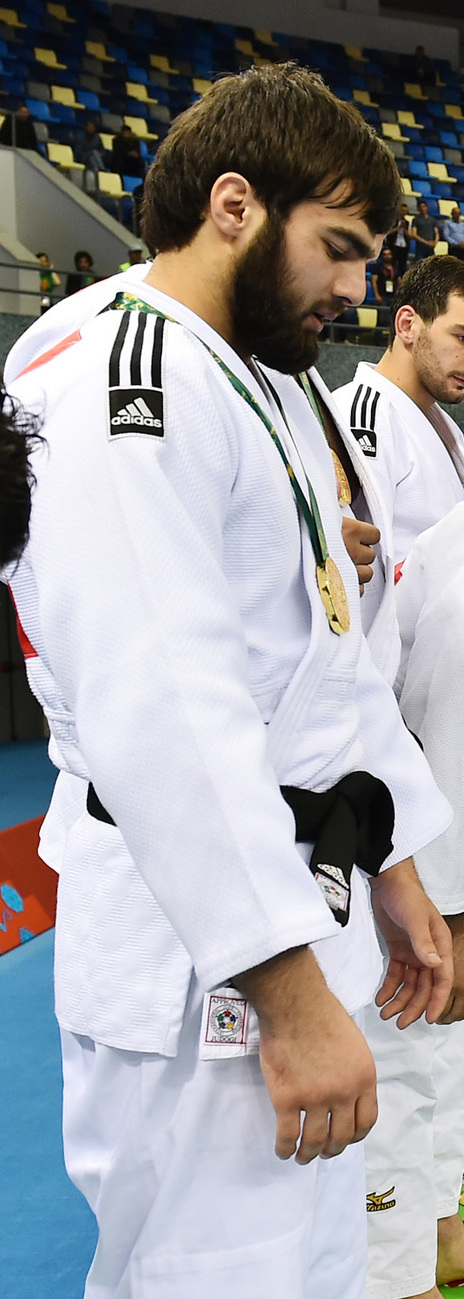

Personal information
- Born: 16 June 1996 (age 30)
- Occupation: Judoka

Sport
- Country: Azerbaijan
- Sport: Judo
- Weight class: ‍–‍81 kg, ‍–‍90 kg

Achievements and titles
- European Champ.: R16 (2017)
Medal record
Men's judo
Representing Azerbaijan
IJF Grand Slam
Gold medal – first place	2017 Baku	‍–‍81 kg
IJF Grand Prix
Bronze medal – third place	2016 Tashkent	‍–‍81 kg

Profile at external databases
- IJF: 13190
- JudoInside.com: 80058
- Updated on 25 November 2022

Rufat Ismayilov (born 16 June 1996) is an Azerbaijani judoka.

Ismayilov is the gold medalist of the 2017 Judo Grand Slam Baku in the ‍–‍81 kg category.
