= Fares Badawi =

Palestinian judoka (born 1996)

Personal information
- Nationality: Palestinian
- Born: 25 July 1996 (age 29) Damascus, Syria
- Home town: Yarmouk, Damascus, Syria
- Education: TU Braunschweig
- Occupations: Judoka; civil engineer
- Height: 1.78 m (5 ft 10 in)
- Spouse: Fatima Saleh

Sport
- Country: IJF Refugee Team (2019–2022); Palestine (2023–present)
- Sport: Judo
- Weight class: −73 kg (2019–2021) −81 kg (2022–present)
- Club: ASC 1846 Göttingen; Braunschweiger Judo Club
- Turned pro: 2019
- Coached by: Gottfried Hahn, Florian Hahn (club); Thaer Al-Natsha (national team)

Achievements and titles
- Olympic Games: R32 (2024)
- World Champ.: R32 (2022)
- Asian Champ.: R32 (2023, 2024)

Profile at external databases
- IJF: 54298
- JudoInside.com: 118112
- Updated on 30 July 2024

Fares Badawi (Arabic: فارس بدوي, pronounced [ˈfæːrɪs ˈbædæwi]; born 25 July 1996) is a Palestinian judoka who competed at the 2024 Paris Olympics.

== Early and personal life ==
Badawi was born in Damascus, Syria, to Ndal and Amera Badawi, children of Palestinian refugees from Tarshiha who were expelled in 1948. He grew up in the Yarmouk refugee camp with his parents and three siblings (Fadi, Hamza and Obada). At the age of 9, following his oldest brother, he started practising judo at the Arab Palestinian Club in Yarmouk, coached by Mohamed Al-Nimr. He also claims to have been inspired by Korean Olympic medallist An Chang-rim.

In 2015, Badawi and his family fled the Syrian civil war for Germany, settling in Braunschweig, where he lives as of 2024. Besides his native Arabic, he speaks German and English. As of July 2024, he is pursuing a master's degree in civil engineering at the Technical University of Braunschweig.

Badawi is a practicing Muslim. He is married to Fatima Saleh.

== Career ==
After moving to Germany, Badawi joined the ASC 1846 Göttingen and started competing in national German tournaments, winning a gold medal at the HT 16 Open in Hamburg in 2017, as well as a silver medal and two bronze medals in other competitions.

He made his international debut as part of the IJF Refugee Team at the 2019 Judo Grand Prix Budapest, Hungary, and then competed in the 73 kg category at the 2019 World Judo Championships in Tokyo, Japan. He competed in the 2020 Judo Grand Slam Paris and 2020 Judo Grand Slam Düsseldorf. He went on to take part in the 2021 and 2022 World Championships, where he finished 33rd in the 73 kg category and 17th in the 81 kg category, respectively. In 2023, he first represented Palestine at the 2023 European Open in Madrid, Spain, then in the 90 kg category at the 2022 Asian Games in Hangzhou, China, and at the 2024 Asian Championships in Hong Kong.

In 2024, Badawi was assigned a universality spot to represent Palestine at the Summer Olympics in Paris, France, in the 81 kg category; he was eliminated by Tajik Somon Makhmadbekov during the round of 32.
