= Morad Zemouri =

Qatari judoka

Morad Zemouri (born March 3, 1993) is a Qatari judoka. He competed at the 2016 Summer Olympics in the men's 73 kg event, in which he was eliminated in the second round by Dirk Van Tichelt.
