= Lee Sung-ho =

South Korean judoka (born 1992)

Personal information
- Nationality: Korean
- Born: 9 July 1992 (age 33)
- Occupation: Judoka

Sport
- Country: South Korea
- Sport: Judo
- Weight class: ‍–‍81 kg, ‍–‍90 kg

Achievements and titles
- Olympic Games: R16 (2020)
- World Champ.: R32 (2021)
- Asian Champ.: (bronze) (2019)
Medal record
Men's judo
Representing South Korea
Asian Championships
Bronze medal – third place	2019 Fujairah	‍–‍81 kg
IJF Grand Slam
Silver medal – second place	2017 Tokyo	‍–‍81 kg
Bronze medal – third place	2021 Kazan	‍–‍81 kg
IJF Grand Prix
Bronze medal – third place	2015 Jeju	‍–‍81 kg
Bronze medal – third place	2019 Hohhot	‍–‍81 kg
Bronze medal – third place	2023 Perth	‍–‍90 kg

Profile at external databases
- IJF: 16482
- JudoInside.com: 50712
- Updated on 12 November 2023

Lee Sung-ho (born 9 July 1992) is a judoka from South Korea

Lee Sung-Ho has competed at judoka and won numerous prizes. He secured bronze at the 2015 Jeju Grand Prix, claimed silver at the 2017 Tokyo Grand Slam, awarded a bronze medal at the 2019 Asian Pacific Championships in Fujairah and a bronze medal at the 2019 Hohhot Grand Prix. He clinched a bronze medal at the World Military Games in Wuhan in 2019. He then also claimed a bronze medal at the 2021 Kazan Grand Slam. He was selected to compete in the Judo at the 2020 Summer Olympics – Men's 81 kg.
