= Takeshi Sasaki =

Japanese judoka (born 1996)

Personal information
- Born: 16 July 1996 (age 29)
- Occupation: Judoka

Sport
- Country: Japan
- Sport: Judo
- Weight class: ‍–‍81 kg

Achievements and titles
- Asian Champ.: (gold) (2022)
Medal record
Men's judo
Representing Japan
Asian Championships
Gold medal – first place	2022 Nur‑ Sultan	‍–‍81 kg
World Masters
Gold medal – first place	2018 Guangzhou	‍–‍81 kg
IJF Grand Slam
Gold medal – first place	2018 Osaka	‍–‍81 kg
Gold medal – first place	2021 Paris	‍–‍81 kg
Silver medal – second place	2018 Ekaterinburg	‍–‍81 kg
IJF Grand Prix
Gold medal – first place	2018 Hohhot	‍–‍81 kg
Asian Junior Championships
Gold medal – first place	2014 Hong Kong	‍–‍81 kg

Profile at external databases
- IJF: 42308
- JudoInside.com: 94111
- Updated on 6 August 2022

Takeshi Sasaki (born 16 July 1996) is a Japanese judoka. He is the gold medalist in the ‍–‍81 kg at the 2021 Judo Grand Slam Paris
