= Wesam Abu Rmilah =

Palestinian judoka

Wesam Abu Rmila
Personal information
- Native name: وسام أبو رميلة
- Nationality: Palestinian
- Born: December 10, 1995 (age 30) Jerusalem, Israel

Sport
- Country: Palestine
- Sport: Judo
- Weight class: –81 kg
- Event: –81 kg (half-middleweight)

Achievements and titles
- Olympic finals: 17th (2020 Tokyo –81 kg)

Wesam Abu Rmila (Arabic: وسام أبو رميلة; born 10 December 1995) is a judoka from Palestine.

== Career ==
Abu Rmilah took part in the 2013 World Judo Championships in Rio de Janeiro, Brazil, and then qualified for the 2015 edition in Astana, Kazakhstan. He entered the 2018 Asian Games in Indonesia, the 2019 Asia-Oceania Championships in Abu Dhabi, Arab Emirates, and the 2017 Grand Prix in Antalya, Turkey. He was chosen to compete in the Judo at the 2020 Summer Olympics – Men's 81 kg in Tokyo, Japan.

== Personal life ==
Born in Jerusalem, his father had also competed in judo in Palestine and has acted as his coach. His brothers, Ahmed and Amr, have also represented their state in judoka.
