= Didar Khamza =

Kazakhstani judoka (born 1997)

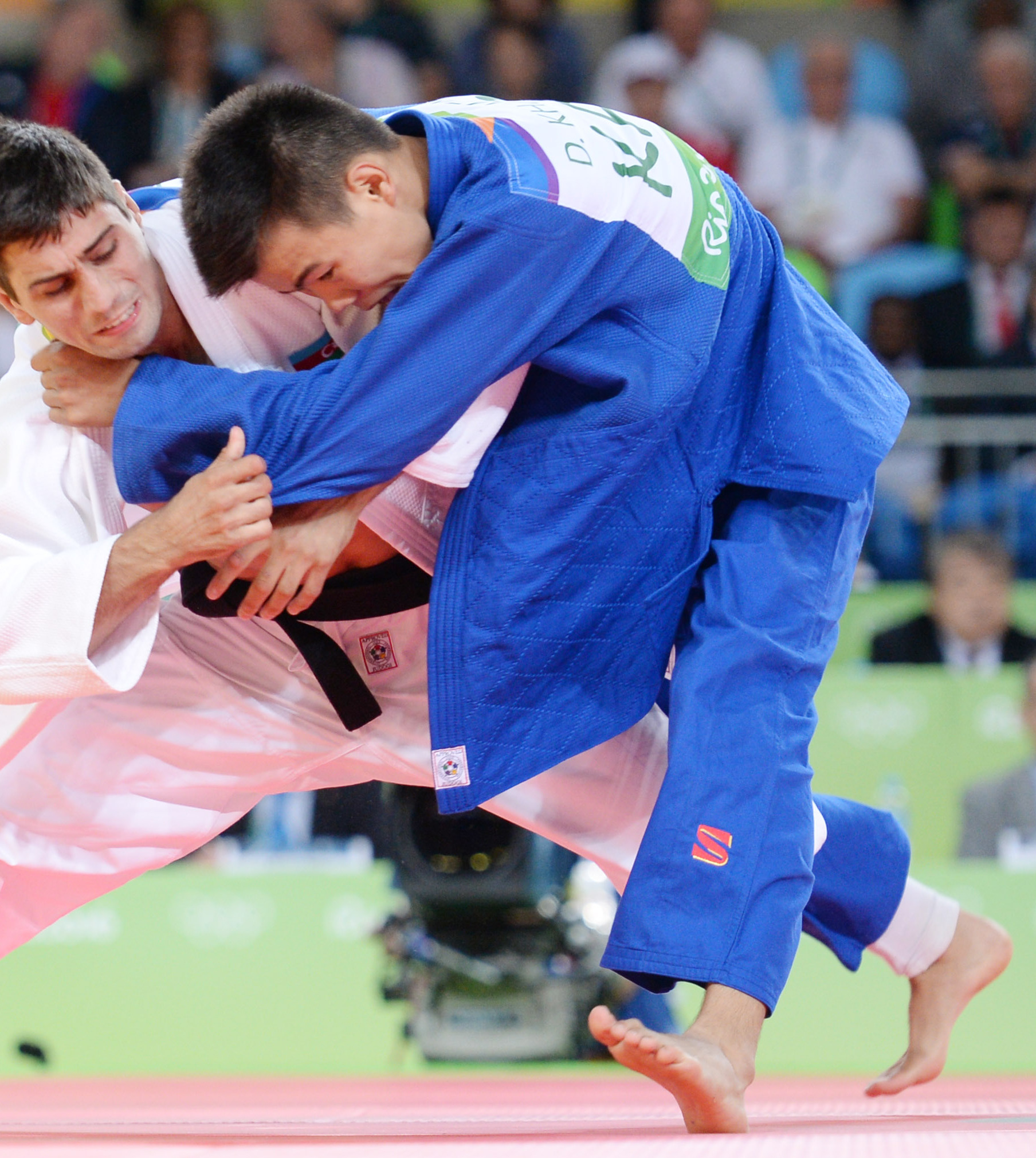
- Khamza (right) at the 2016 Olympics

Personal information
- Born: 15 February 1997 (age 29)
- Occupation: Judoka
- Height: 175 cm (5 ft 9 in)

Sport
- Country: Kazakhstan
- Sport: Judo
- Weight class: ‍–‍81 kg

Achievements and titles
- Olympic Games: R32 (2016, 2020)
- World Champ.: R32 (2018)
- Asian Champ.: (gold) (2018)
Medal record
Men's judo
Representing Kazakhstan
Asian Games
Gold medal – first place	2018 Jakarta	‍–‍81 kg
Asian Championships
Silver medal – second place	2016 Tashkent	‍–‍73 kg
Bronze medal – third place	2022 Nur‑Sultan	‍–‍90 kg
IJF Grand Slam
Bronze medal – third place	2018 Abu Dhabi	‍–‍81 kg
Bronze medal – third place	2022 Ulaanbaatar	‍–‍90 kg
IJF Grand Prix
Gold medal – first place	2018 Tashkent	‍–‍81 kg
Bronze medal – third place	2016 Almaty	‍–‍73 kg
World Juniors Championships
Bronze medal – third place	2017 Zagreb	‍–‍73 kg
World Cadets Championships
Bronze medal – third place	2013 Miami	‍–‍66 kg
Asian Cadet Championships
Gold medal – first place	2014 Hong Kong	‍–‍73 kg
Bronze medal – third place	2013 Hainan	‍–‍73 kg
Asian Cadet Championships
Gold medal – first place	2012 Taipei	‍–‍66 kg

Profile at external databases
- IJF: 13619
- JudoInside.com: 86240
- Updated on 8 August 2022

Didar Khamza (born 15 February 1997) is a Kazakhstani judoka. He won a silver medal at the 2016 Asian Judo Championships and competed at the 2016 Summer Olympics, where he was eliminated in the second round.
