= Jaromír Musil =

Czech judoka (born 1988)

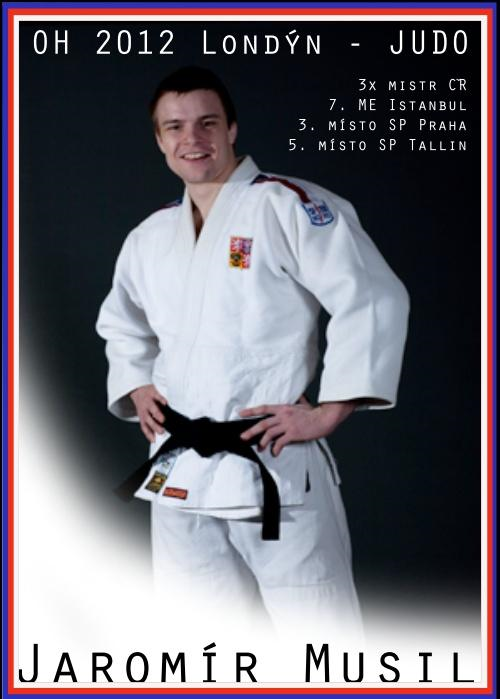
- Portrait of Jaromír Musil

Personal information
- Born: 28 May 1988 (age 38)
- Occupation: Judoka

Sport
- Country: Czech Republic
- Sport: Judo
- Weight class: ‍–‍81 kg

Achievements and titles
- Olympic Games: R32 (2012)
- World Champ.: R32 (2011, 2018)
- European Champ.: 7th (2011, 2017)
Medal record
Men's judo
Representing Czech Republic
IJF Grand Prix
Silver medal – second place	2016 Ulaanbaatar	‍–‍81 kg
Bronze medal – third place	2013 Ulaanbaatar	‍–‍81 kg

Profile at external databases
- IJF: 1882
- JudoInside.com: 32385
- Updated on 8 December 2022

Jaromír Musil (Czech pronunciation: [ˈjaromiːr ˈmusɪl]; born 28 May 1988 in Prague) is a Czech judoka. He competed in the men's 81 kg event at the 2012 Summer Olympics and was eliminated in the second round by Sergiu Toma.
