= Damian Szwarnowiecki =

Polish judoka (born 1993)

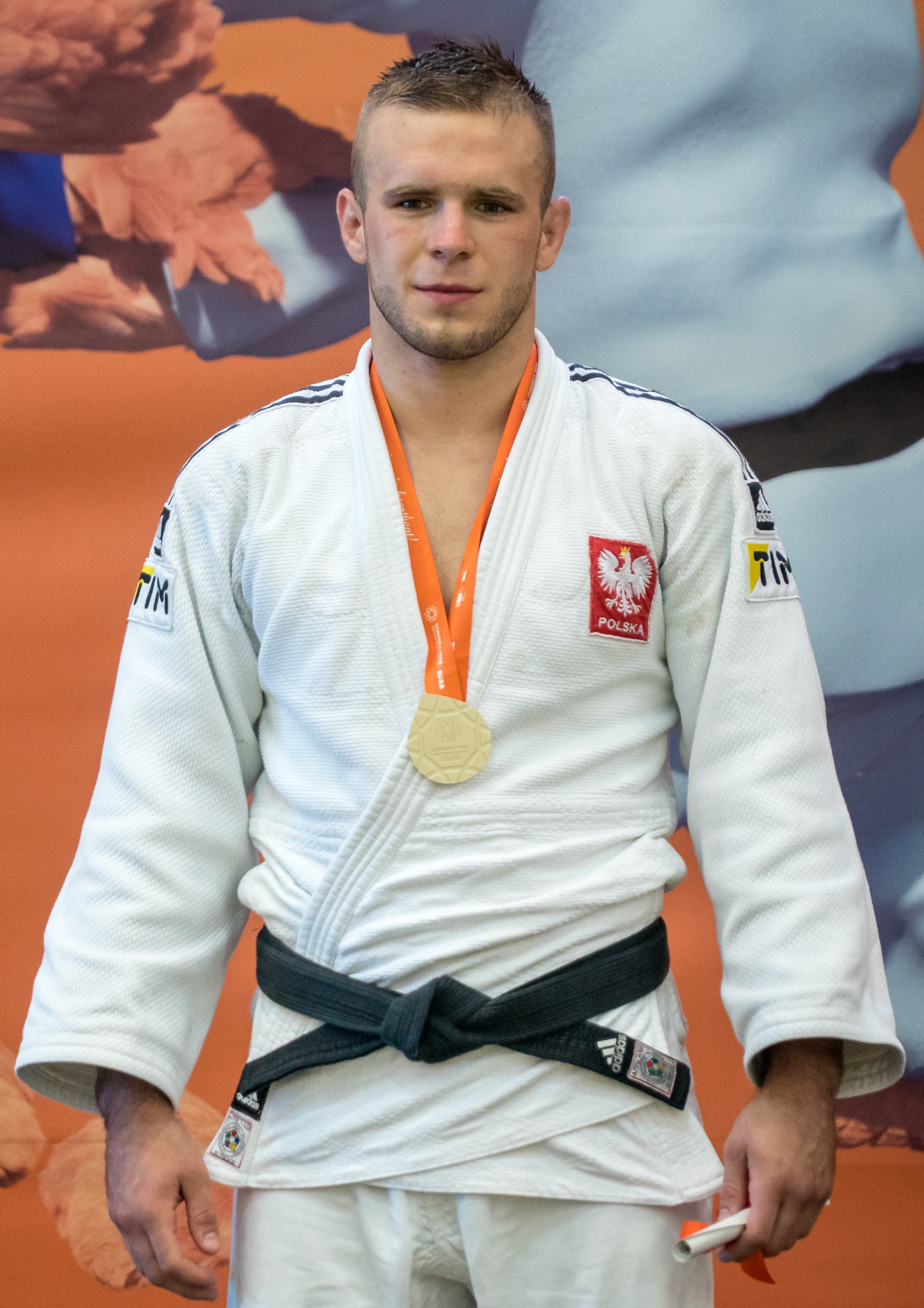

Personal information
- Nationality: Polish
- Born: 20 December 1993 (age 32)
- Occupation: Judoka

Sport
- Country: Poland
- Sport: Judo
- Weight class: –73 kg, –81 kg

Achievements and titles
- World Champ.: 5th (2018)
- European Champ.: R16 (2013, 2017)
Medal record
Men's judo
Representing Poland
IJF Grand Prix
Gold medal – first place	2016 Samsun	–73 kg
Bronze medal – third place	2016 Zagreb	–81 kg
Bronze medal – third place	2019 Marrakesh	–81 kg
European U23 Championships
Gold medal – first place	2012 Prague	–73 kg
European Junior Championships
Gold medal – first place	2012 Poreč	–73 kg

Profile at external databases
- IJF: 9581
- JudoInside.com: 60161
- Updated on 29 November 2022

Damian Swarnowiecki (born 20 December 1993) is a Polish judoka.

He is the gold medallist of the 2016 Judo Grand Prix Samsun in the -73 kg category.
