= Étienne Briand =

Canadian judoka (born 1993)

Etienne Briand
Personal information
- Born: 22 February 1993 (age 33)
- Occupation: Judoka

Sport
- Country: Canada
- Sport: Judo
- Weight class: –81 kg

Achievements and titles
- World Champ.: R16 (2019)
- Pan American Champ.: (2019)
Medal record
Men's judo
Representing Canada
Pan American Championships
Silver medal – second place	2019 Lima	–81 kg
Bronze medal – third place	2017 Panama City	–81 kg
Bronze medal – third place	2022 Lima	–81 kg
IJF Grand Slam
Bronze medal – third place	2017 Ekaterinburg	–81 kg
Bronze medal – third place	2019 Ekaterinburg	–81 kg
IJF Grand Prix
Silver medal – second place	2017 Cancún	–81 kg
Bronze medal – third place	2016 Qingdao	–81 kg

Profile at external databases
- IJF: 10679
- JudoInside.com: 50943
- Updated on 3 July 2022

Etienne Briand (born 22 February 1993) is a Canadian judoka.

He is the bronze medallist of the 2019 Judo Grand Slam Ekaterinburg in the -81 kg category.
