= Shamil Borchashvili =

Austrian judoka (born 1995)

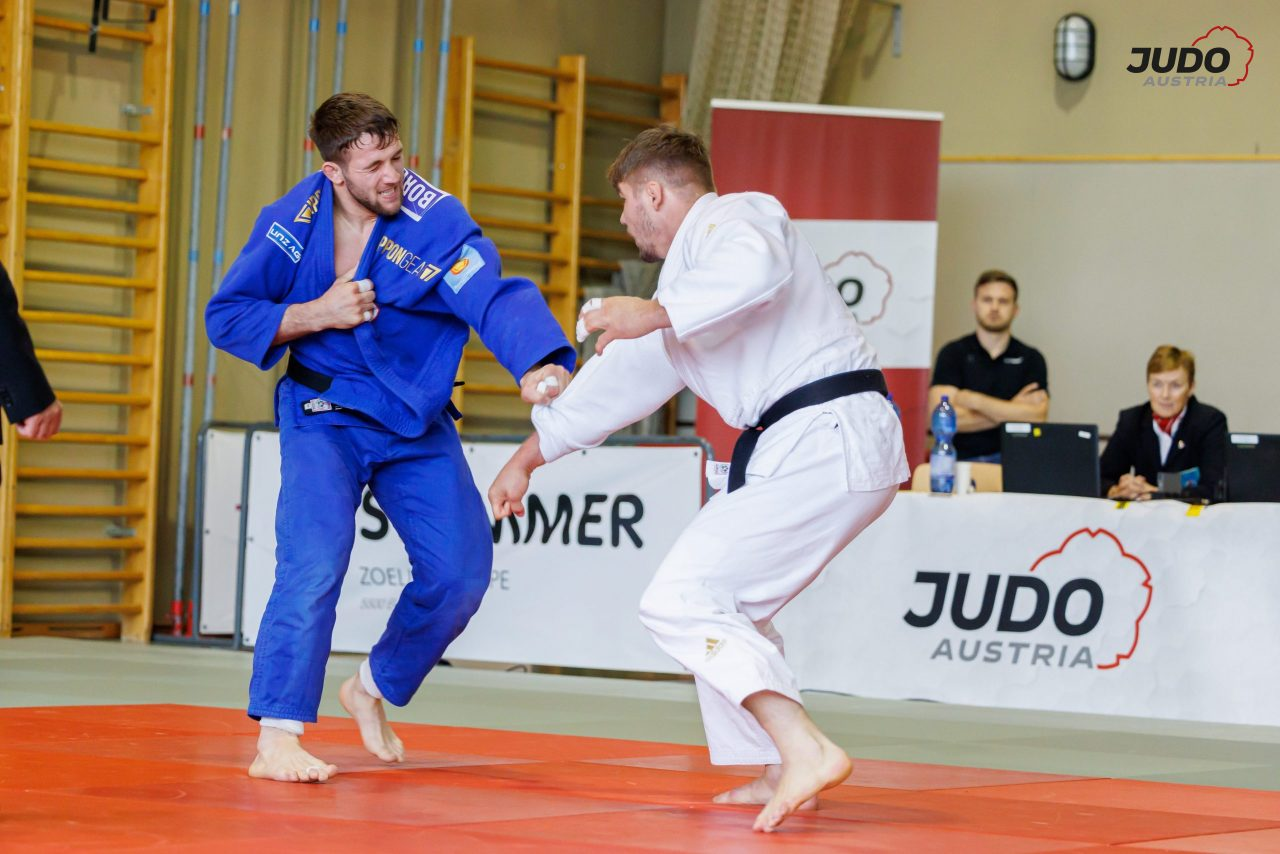
- Borchashvili (blue) participates in the Austrian 1. Bundesliga 2022

Personal information
- Nationality: Austrian
- Born: 9 June 1995 (age 31) Grozny, Chechnya, Russia
- Occupation: Judoka
- Employer: Austrian Armed Forces
- Height: 1.73 m (5 ft 8 in)
- Weight: 81 kg (179 lb)
- Website: shamilborchashvili.at

Sport
- Country: Austria
- Sport: Judo
- Weight class: ‍–‍81 kg
- Rank: 1st dan black belt
- League: Erste Judo Bundesliga
- Club: Judo LZ Wels (until 2024)
- Coached by: Yvonne Snir-Bönisch
- Retired: 3 September 2025

Achievements and titles
- Olympic Games: (bronze) (2020)
- World Champ.: (bronze) (2022)
- European Champ.: (bronze) (2024)
Medal record
Men's judo
Representing Austria
Olympic Games
Bronze medal – third place	2020 Tokyo	‍–‍81 kg
World Championships
Bronze medal – third place	2022 Tashkent	‍–‍81 kg
European Games
Bronze medal – third place	2019 Minsk	Mixed team
European Championships
Bronze medal – third place	2024 Zagreb	‍–‍81 kg
IJF Grand Slam
Silver medal – second place	2021 Tbilisi	‍–‍81 kg
Silver medal – second place	2022 Ulaanbaatar	‍–‍81 kg
Silver medal – second place	2023 Tashkent	‍–‍81 kg
Silver medal – second place	2023 Baku	‍–‍81 kg
Silver medal – second place	2024 Tashkent	‍–‍81 kg
IJF Grand Prix
Gold medal – first place	2023 Linz	‍–‍81 kg
Bronze medal – third place	2019 Tashkent	‍–‍81 kg

Profile at external databases
- IJF: 41412
- JudoInside.com: 60508
- Updated on 27 April 2024

Shamil Borchashvili (born 9 June 1995) is an Austrian retired judoka. He is a first degree black belt.

== Career ==
Borchashvili immigrated to Wels, Austria with his family from Chechnya, Russia when he was a child.

Borchashvili won the silver medal at the 2021 Judo Grand Slam Tbilisi in the -81 kg class.

Borchashvili won the bronze medal in the men's 81kg Judo competition in the postponed 2020 Summer Olympics held in 2021 in Tokyo.

Borchashvli won another bronze medal in the Men's 81 kg at the 2022 World Judo Championships by defeating 2020 Olympic silver medalist Saeid Mollaei.

Borchashvili wanted to compete at the 2022 Judo World Masters in Jerusalem without the coach. Since this was deemed unacceptable by the Austrian Judo Federation, his registration for the tournament was withdrawn for disciplinary reasons.

Although Borchashvili managed to qualify for the 2024 Summer Olympics he decided not to start and was replaced with his brother Wachid Borchashvili.

Borchashvili competed in his final professional event at the 2025 World Judo Championships, where he was defeated in the first round by Matthias Casse. Two months later, he announced his retirement from competition.

== Personal life ==
Borchashvili is a graduate of the mechanical engineering department of the HTL Wels.

Borchashvili's brothers Wachid and Kimran are also part of the national team. Wachid won the gold medal at the 2023 Tbilisi Grand Slam.

In the fall of 2024, the Borchashvili brothers founded a new martial arts club.
