= Saeid Mollaei =

Mongolian judoka (born 1992)

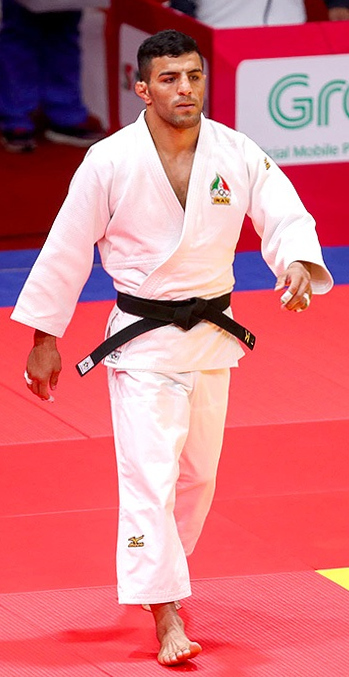
- Mollaei at the 2018 Asian Games

Personal information
- Born: 5 January 1992 (age 34) Tehran, Iran
- Occupation: Judoka
- Height: 176 cm (5 ft 9 in)

Sport
- Country: Azerbaijan (Since 2022); Mongolia (2019–2022); Iran (2011–2019)
- Sport: Judo
- Weight class: –81 kg
- Rank: 5th dan black belt
- Coached by: Mehrdad Hasanzadeh; Mohammad Mansouri

Achievements and titles
- Olympic Games: (silver) (2020)
- World Champ.: (gold) (2018)
- Asian Champ.: (silver) (2017, 2018)
Medal record
Men's judo
Representing Azerbaijan
World Masters
Silver medal – second place	2022 Jerusalem	‍–‍81 kg
IJF Grand Slam
Gold medal – first place	2022 Baku	‍–‍81 kg
Silver medal – second place	2022 Budapest	‍–‍81 kg
Silver medal – second place	2023 Antalya	‍–‍81 kg
IJF Grand Prix
Silver medal – second place	2022 Zagreb	‍–‍81 kg
Bronze medal – third place	2024 Odivelas	‍–‍81 kg
Representing Mongolia
Olympic Games
Silver medal – second place	2020 Tokyo	‍–‍81 kg
Asian Championships
Bronze medal – third place	2021 Bishkek	‍–‍81 kg
IJF Grand Slam
Silver medal – second place	2021 Tel Aviv	‍–‍81 kg
Bronze medal – third place	2020 Budapest	‍–‍81 kg
Representing Iran
World Championships
Gold medal – first place	2018 Baku	‍–‍81 kg
Bronze medal – third place	2017 Budapest	‍–‍81 kg
Asian Games
Silver medal – second place	2018 Jakarta	‍–‍81 kg
Asian Championships
Silver medal – second place	2017 Hong Kong	‍–‍81 kg
Bronze medal – third place	2015 Kuwait City	‍–‍81 kg
Bronze medal – third place	2016 Tashkent	‍–‍81 kg
IJF Grand Slam
Gold medal – first place	2018 Düsseldorf	‍–‍81 kg
Silver medal – second place	2017 Baku	‍–‍81 kg
Bronze medal – third place	2017 Abu Dhabi	‍–‍81 kg
Bronze medal – third place	2018 Ekaterinburg	‍–‍81 kg
Bronze medal – third place	2019 Paris	‍–‍81 kg
IJF Grand Prix
Gold medal – first place	2019 Hohhot	‍–‍81 kg
Bronze medal – third place	2015 Samsun	‍–‍81 kg
Bronze medal – third place	2015 Ulaanbaatar	‍–‍81 kg
Bronze medal – third place	2017 Tbilisi	‍–‍81 kg
Bronze medal – third place	2017 The Hague	‍–‍81 kg
Bronze medal – third place	2019 Zagreb	‍–‍81 kg
Asian Junior Championships
Bronze medal – third place	2011 Beirut	‍–‍73 kg
Islamic Solidarity Games
Gold medal – first place	2017 Baku	‍–‍81 kg

Profile at external databases
- IJF: 68901
- JudoInside.com: 81144
- Updated on 27 January 2024

Saeid Mollaei (Persian: سعید ملایی; Mongolian: Саид Моллай; Azerbaijani: Səid Mollayi; born January 5, 1992) is an Iranian-born Mongolian half-middleweight judoka. He was born in Tehran to ethnic Azerbaijani parents originally from Khoy. Iranian authorities ordered Mollaei to lose intentionally in the semi-final at the Tokyo 2019 World Championships, so as to avoid a potential match in the finals against Israeli 2019 world champion Sagi Muki. In August 2019, he moved to Europe with a two-year visa from Germany, saying he was afraid to return to Iran after exposing and criticizing its pressure on him to deliberately lose in the World Championships. In December 2019, he became a citizen of Mongolia. He dedicated his 2020 Olympic medal to Mongolia, to the Mongol people, and to Israel. From May 2022 on, Mollaei represents Azerbaijan.

== Judo career ==
In 2001, at the age of 10, he entered the Persian Gulf Judo School run by Mehrdad Hassanzadeh, a judo instructor.

He won bronze medals at the 2015 and 2016 Asian Championships, and a silver medal at the 2017 edition. He was a bronze medalist at the Budapest 2017 World Championships, and a 2018 Baku World Championships gold medalist.

He competed at the 2016 Summer Olympics in the 81 kg event, and was eliminated in the first bout by Khasan Khalmurzaev.

Iranian authorities, the Iranian Sports Minister and the presidents of the Iran Judo Federation and the Iran Olympic Committee, ordered Mollaei to intentionally lose in the semi-final at the Tokyo 2019 World Championships, so as to avoid a potential match in the finals against Israeli 2019 world champion Sagi Muki.

In reaction, saying he was afraid to return to Iran after exposing and criticizing its pressure on him to deliberately lose in the World Championships to avoid a potential bout against Muki, in August 2019 he moved to Europe with a two-year visa from Germany.

Iran's actions led the International Judo Federation (IJF) to indefinitely ban Iran from competition. The IJF disciplinary commission examining the case found that Iran's actions "constitute a serious breach and gross violation of the Statutes of the IJF, its legitimate interests, its principles and objectives." The ban will last until "the Iran Judo Federation give strong guarantees and prove that they will respect the IJF Statutes and accept that their athletes fight against Israeli athletes."

On 1 November 2019 Germany agreed to grant Mollaei asylum. That month, he competed as part of the IJF refugee team at the Osaka Grand Slam. Muki congratulated Mollaei on Instagram for returning to judo and participating in Osaka in his first competition since the World Championships in Tokyo, and Mollaei, in turn, thanked Muki for his support and wrote: "Good luck to you all the time, my best friend." Mollaei also posted a photo of them standing together, and wrote: "This is true friendship and a win for sports and judo over politics."

On 16 November 2019, he received the Crans Montana Forum gold medal from Ambassador Jean-Paul Carteron for the difficult decision he took in Japan. The mission of the Crans Montana Forum is "Towards a more Humane World". In accepting the award, Mollaei said: "We must try to make a better world. A peaceful world, more equal, more friendly, and more fair."

On 1 December 2019, Mongolian President Khaltmaagiin Battulga (himself the chairman of Mongolian Judo Federation) offered him citizenship, which he accepted.

Mollaei arrived in Israel in February 2021 to compete at the Tel Aviv Grand Prix. He represented Mongolia at Grand Slam Hungary 2020 and won bronze medal in –81 kg category.

Mollaei trained in Israel with the Israeli national judo team in the months prior to the 2020 Summer Olympics. He went on to win the silver medal in the men's –81 kg event.

== Personal life ==
Mollaei was born on December 26, 1991, in Tehran. In 2001, at the age of 10, he joined the Persian Gulf Judo School in Tehransar, Tehran, under the guidance of judo coach Mehrdad Hassanzadeh. He married Nijat Azizova, a judo athlete from the Republic of Azerbaijan, in 2018.

== See also ==
- Boycotts of Israel in sports
- List of Iranian defectors
