= Otgonbaataryn Uuganbaatar =

Mongolian judoka (born 1988)

Personal information
- Born: Отгонбаатарын Ууганбаатар; 19 February 1988 (age 38) Ulaanbaatar, Mongolia
- Occupation: Judoka

Sport
- Country: Mongolia
- Sport: Judo, Sambo
- Weight class: ‍–‍81 kg

Achievements and titles
- Olympic Games: R32 (2016)
- World Champ.: 5th (2013, 2017)
- Asian Champ.: (gold) (2019)
- National finals: (gold) (2015, 2016, 2017, 2018, 2019, 2020)
Medal record
Representing Mongolia
Men's judo
World Championships
Bronze medal – third place	2015 Astana	Men's team
Asian Games
Bronze medal – third place	2018 Jakarta	‍–‍81 kg
Asian Championships
Gold medal – first place	2019 Fujairah	‍–‍81 kg
Bronze medal – third place	2013 Bangkok	‍–‍81 kg
Bronze medal – third place	2015 Kuwait City	‍–‍81 kg
IJF Grand Slam
Gold medal – first place	2017 Tokyo	‍–‍81 kg
Silver medal – second place	2017 Abu Dhabi	‍–‍81 kg
Bronze medal – third place	2015 Paris	‍–‍81 kg
Bronze medal – third place	2017 Baku	‍–‍81 kg
IJF Grand Prix
Silver medal – second place	2013 Ulaanbaatar	‍–‍81 kg
Bronze medal – third place	2012 Qingdao	‍–‍81 kg
Bronze medal – third place	2013 Almaty	‍–‍81 kg
Bronze medal – third place	2014 Tashkent	‍–‍81 kg
Bronze medal – third place	2014 Qingdao	‍–‍81 kg
Bronze medal – third place	2015 Qingdao	‍–‍81 kg
Bronze medal – third place	2016 Tbilisi	‍–‍81 kg
Men's sambo
World Championships
Bronze medal – third place	2013 Saint Petersburg	‍–‍82 kg

Profile at external databases
- IJF: 2146
- JudoInside.com: 57377
- Updated on 24 November 2022

Otgonbaataryn Uuganbaatar (Mongolian: Отгонбаатарын Ууганбаатар; born 19 February 1988) is a Mongolian judoka. He competed at the 2016 Summer Olympics in the men's 81 kg event, in which he was eliminated in the second round by Mohamed Abdelaal.
