= Sotaro Fujiwara =

Japanese judoka (born 1998)

Personal information
- Born: 27 April 1998 (age 28) Hyōgo Prefecture, Japan
- Occupation: Judoka

Sport
- Country: Japan
- Sport: Judo
- Weight class: ‍–‍81 kg

Achievements and titles
- World Champ.: (silver) (2018)
- Asian Champ.: (gold) (2017)
Medal record
Men's judo
Representing Japan
World Championships
Silver medal – second place	2018 Baku	‍–‍81 kg
Asian Games
Gold medal – first place	2026 Aichi‑Nagoya	‍–‍81 kg
Asian Championships
Gold medal – first place	2017 Hong Kong	‍–‍81 kg
IJF Grand Slam
Gold medal – first place	2018 Paris	‍–‍81 kg
Gold medal – first place	2018 Ekaterinburg	‍–‍81 kg
Gold medal – first place	2019 Düsseldorf	‍–‍81 kg
Gold medal – first place	2022 Paris	‍–‍81 kg
Gold medal – first place	2024 Tokyo	‍–‍81 kg
Silver medal – second place	2019 Osaka	‍–‍81 kg
Silver medal – second place	2025 Tokyo	‍–‍81 kg
Bronze medal – third place	2020 Paris	‍–‍81 kg
Bronze medal – third place	2021 Paris	‍–‍81 kg
Bronze medal – third place	2022 Tokyo	‍–‍81 kg
Bronze medal – third place	2024 Astana	‍–‍81 kg
Bronze medal – third place	2026 Tashkent	‍–‍81 kg
IJF Grand Prix
Silver medal – second place	2019 Hohhot	‍–‍81 kg
Bronze medal – third place	2018 Zagreb	‍–‍81 kg
World University Games
Gold medal – first place	2017 Taipei	Men's team
World Juniors Championships
Silver medal – second place	2015 Abu Dhabi	‍–‍81 kg
Asian Cadet Championships
Silver medal – second place	2014 Hong Kong	‍–‍81 kg

Profile at external databases
- IJF: 28255
- JudoInside.com: 94059
- Updated on 1 October 2026

Sotaro Fujiwara (藤原 崇太郎, Fujiwara Sōtarō; born 27 April 1998) is a Japanese judoka.

Fujiwara participated at the 2018 World Judo Championships, winning a silver medal.

Fujiwara won the gold medal in his event at the 2022 Judo Grand Slam Paris held in Paris, France.
