= Khasan Khalmurzaev =

Russian judoka (born 1993)

- Khalmurzaev at the 2016 Summer Olympics in Rio de Janeiro, Brasil

Personal information
- Nationality: Russian
- Born: 9 October 1993 (age 33) Nazran, Ingushetia, Russia
- Occupation: Judoka
- Years active: 2010–
- Height: 1.82 m (6 ft 0 in)

Sport
- Country: Russia
- Sport: Judo
- Weight class: –81 kg

Achievements and titles
- Olympic Games: (gold) (2016)
- World Champ.: (bronze) (2017)
- European Champ.: (gold) (2016)
Medal record
Men's judo
Representing Russia
Olympic Games
Gold medal – first place	2016 Rio de Janeiro	‍–‍81 kg
World Championships
Bronze medal – third place	2017 Budapest	‍–‍81 kg
European Championships
Gold medal – first place	2016 Kazan	‍–‍81 kg
World Masters
Gold medal – first place	2017 Saint Petersburg	‍–‍81 kg
IJF Grand Slam
Gold medal – first place	2015 Baku	‍–‍81 kg
Gold medal – first place	2017 Ekaterinburg	‍–‍81 kg
Silver medal – second place	2020 Düsseldorf	‍–‍81 kg
IJF Grand Prix
Gold medal – first place	2013 Almaty	‍–‍81 kg
Gold medal – first place	2014 Budapest	‍–‍81 kg
Gold medal – first place	2016 Havana	‍–‍81 kg
Silver medal – second place	2014 Astana	‍–‍81 kg
Silver medal – second place	2015 Jeju	‍–‍81 kg
Silver medal – second place	2018 Hohhot	‍–‍81 kg
Bronze medal – third place	2015 Zagreb	‍–‍81 kg
Bronze medal – third place	2018 Agadir	‍–‍81 kg
Bronze medal – third place	2019 Antalya	‍–‍81 kg
European U23 Championships
Silver medal – second place	2013 Samokov	‍–‍81 kg
Bronze medal – third place	2014 Wrocław	‍–‍81 kg
European Junior Championships
Gold medal – first place	2011 Lommel	‍–‍81 kg
World Cadets Championships
Gold medal – first place	2009 Budapest	‍–‍73 kg
European Cadet Championships
Gold medal – first place	2009 Koper	‍–‍73 kg
Summer Universiade
Gold medal – first place	2015 Gwangju	‍–‍81 kg
Youth Olympic Games
Silver medal – second place	2010 Singapore	‍–‍81 kg

Profile at external databases
- IJF: 9799
- JudoInside.com: 56595
- Updated on 24 May 2023

Khasan Magometovich Khalmurzaev (Russian: Хасан Магометович Халмурзаев; born 9 October 1993) is a Russian judoka. Khasan won the gold medal in the –81 kg event at the 2016 Summer Olympics.

At the 2017 World Judo Championships, Khalmurzaev lost the fight to Alexander Wieczerzak in the semifinals, but won the third-place match against Otgonbaataryn Uuganbaatar.

== Personal life ==
Khalmurzaev is an ethnic Ingush of the Kokurkhoy clan (teip). He has a twin brother, Khusen, who is a judoka, too. He also has three older sisters and an older brother. Their father died when Khasan was 14 years old.

Khalmurzaev serves in the separate battalion of the Patrol-Guard Service of the Ministry of Internal Affairs in Ingueshetia. He is a police sergeant.

Khasan married Zalina in Nasyr-Kort, Ingushetia, on 17 September 2017.

== Awards ==
- Order of Friendship (25 August 2016) — for high sports achievements at the 21st Summer Olympics in 2016 in Rio de Janeiro (Brazil), for his will for victory and sense of purpose.
- Medal "For Service Virtue" (MIA)
