= Sharofiddin Boltaboev =

Uzbekistani judoka (born 1995)

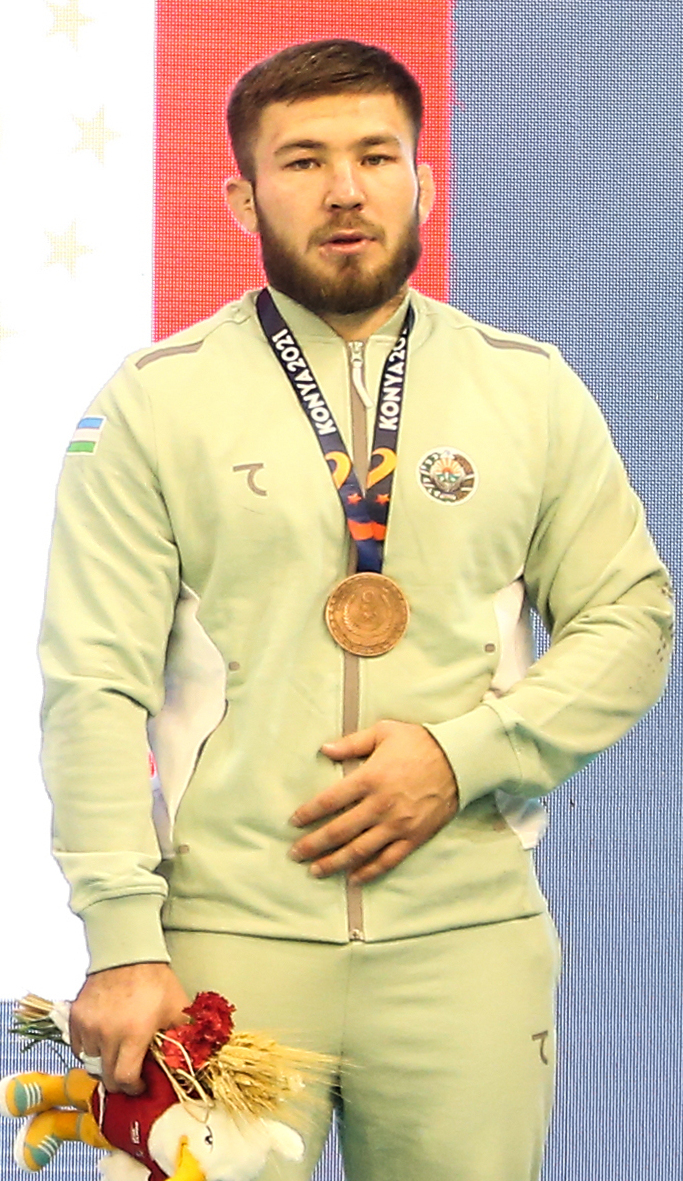

Personal information
- Born: 19 November 1995 (age 30)
- Occupation: Judoka

Sport
- Country: Uzbekistan
- Sport: Judo
- Weight class: ‍–‍81 kg

Achievements and titles
- Olympic Games: 7th (2020, 2024)
- World Champ.: 5th (2021)
- Asian Champ.: (silver) (2015, 2019)
- Highest world ranking: 3^{rd}
Medal record
Men's judo
Representing Uzbekistan
Asian Championships
Silver medal – second place	2015 Kuwait City	‍–‍73 kg
Silver medal – second place	2019 Fujairah	‍–‍81 kg
Bronze medal – third place	2021 Bishkek	‍–‍81 kg
IJF Grand Slam
Gold medal – first place	2021 Tel Aviv	‍–‍81 kg
Gold medal – first place	2024 Astana	‍–‍81 kg
Silver medal – second place	2020 Paris	‍–‍81 kg
Silver medal – second place	2021 Tashkent	‍–‍81 kg
Silver medal – second place	2024 Tbilisi	‍–‍81 kg
Bronze medal – third place	2022 Paris	‍–‍81 kg
Bronze medal – third place	2022 Antalya	‍–‍81 kg
Bronze medal – third place	2022 Tbilisi	‍–‍81 kg
IJF Grand Prix
Gold medal – first place	2019 Tashkent	‍–‍81 kg
Bronze medal – third place	2017 Tashkent	‍–‍81 kg
Islamic Solidarity Games
Bronze medal – third place	2021 Konya	‍–‍81 kg
Asian Junior Championships
Silver medal – second place	2014 Hong Kong	‍–‍73 kg

Profile at external databases
- IJF: 17379
- JudoInside.com: 90080
- Updated on 31 July 2024

Sharofiddin Boltaboev (born 19 November 1995) is an Uzbekistani judoka.

Boltaboev won the silver medal in the men's 81 kg event at the 2019 Asian-Pacific Judo Championships held in Fujairah, United Arab Emirates.

Boltaboev competed in the men's 81 kg event at the 2021 Judo World Masters held in Doha, Qatar. A month later, he won the gold medal in his event at the 2021 Judo Grand Slam Tel Aviv held in Tel Aviv, Israel.

Boltaboev won one of the bronze medals in his event at the 2022 Judo Grand Slam Paris held in Paris, France. He also won one of the bronze medals in his event at the 2022 Judo Grand Slam Antalya held in Antalya, Turkey.
