= Vladimir Zoloev =

Kyrgyzstani judoka (born 1993)

Personal information
- Born: 8 April 1993 (age 33) Vladikavkaz, Russia
- Occupation: Judoka

Sport
- Country: Kyrgyzstan
- Sport: Judo
- Weight class: ‍–‍81 kg

Achievements and titles
- Olympic Games: R32 (2020)
- World Champ.: R16 (2019)
- Asian Champ.: (gold) (2021)
Medal record
Men's judo
Representing Kyrgyzstan
Asian Games
Bronze medal – third place	2018 Jakarta	‍–‍81 kg
Asian Championships
Gold medal – first place	2021 Bishkek	‍–‍81 kg
Bronze medal – third place	2017 Hong Kong	‍–‍81 kg
IJF Grand Prix
Bronze medal – third place	2016 Almaty	‍–‍81 kg
Bronze medal – third place	2018 Tashkent	‍–‍81 kg
World Juniors Championships
Bronze medal – third place	2011 Cape Town	‍–‍73 kg

Profile at external databases
- IJF: 19013
- JudoInside.com: 74661
- Updated on 30 November 2022

Vladimir Zoloev (born 8 April 1993) is a Kyrgyzstani judoka. He competed in the ‍–‍81 kg category at the 2018 Asian Games and in the Asian Judo Championships.

== Achievements ==
Asian Games
Event	Location	Place	Category
2018	Jakarta (Indonesia)	Bronze	–81 kg
Asian Judo Championships
Event	Location	Place	Category
2017	Hong Kong (Hong Kong)	Bronze	–81 kg
2016	Tashkent (Uzbekistan)	7th	–81 kg
2015	Kuwait City (Kuwait)	5th	–81 kg
