= Akmal Murodov =

Tajikistani judoka

Personal information
- Nationality: Tajikistani
- Born: 14 January 1996 (age 30) Danghara, Tajikistan
- Occupation: Judoka

Sport
- Country: Tajikistan
- Sport: Judo
- Weight class: –81 kg

Profile at external databases
- IJF: 25176
- JudoInside.com: 100678
- Updated on 31 October 2021

Akmal Murodov (born 14 January 1996) is a Tajikistani judoka.

He represented Tajikistan in the men's 81 kg event at the 2020 Summer Olympics in Tokyo, Japan.
