= Dominic Ressel =

German judoka (born 1993)

Personal information
- Nationality: German
- Born: 5 October 1993 (age 32) Kiel, Germany
- Occupation: Judoka

Sport
- Country: Germany
- Sport: Judo
- Weight class: –81 kg

Achievements and titles
- Olympic Games: 5th (2020)
- World Champ.: 5th (2018)
- European Champ.: (silver) (2017)
Medal record
Men's judo
Representing Germany
Olympic Games
Bronze medal – third place	2020 Tokyo	Mixed team
World Championships
Bronze medal – third place	2022 Tashkent	Mixed team
European Championships
Silver medal – second place	2017 Warsaw	‍–‍81 kg
Bronze medal – third place	2023 Montpellier	‍–‍81 kg
IJF Grand Slam
Gold medal – first place	2019 Paris	‍–‍81 kg
Silver medal – second place	2016 Tokyo	‍–‍81 kg
Bronze medal – third place	2015 Baku	‍–‍81 kg
Bronze medal – third place	2018 Düsseldorf	‍–‍81 kg
Bronze medal – third place	2019 Düsseldorf	‍–‍81 kg
Bronze medal – third place	2019 Abu Dhabi	‍–‍81 kg
Bronze medal – third place	2023 Astana	‍–‍81 kg
IJF Grand Prix
Gold medal – first place	2018 Zagreb	‍–‍81 kg
Silver medal – second place	2017 The Hague	‍–‍81 kg
Bronze medal – third place	2016 Düsseldorf	‍–‍81 kg
Bronze medal – third place	2018 The Hague	‍–‍81 kg
Bronze medal – third place	2019 Hohhot	‍–‍81 kg
European U23 Championships
Bronze medal – third place	2014 Wrocław	‍–‍81 kg
World Juniors Championships
Bronze medal – third place	2013 Ljubljana	‍–‍81 kg

Profile at external databases
- IJF: 14672
- JudoInside.com: 61871
- Updated on 4 November 2023

Dominic Ressel (born 5 October 1993) is a German judoka. He is the 2017 European silver medalist in the ‍–‍81 kg division.
