= Alexander Wieczerzak =

German judoka (born 1991)

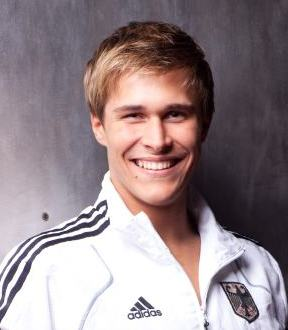
- Wieczerzak in 2011

Personal information
- Nationality: German
- Born: 22 March 1991 (age 35) Frankfurt, Germany
- Occupation: Judoka
- Height: 1.82 m (6 ft 0 in)
- Website: www.wieczerzak.de

Sport
- Country: Germany
- Sport: Judo
- Weight class: –81 kg

Achievements and titles
- World Champ.: (2017)
- European Champ.: (bronze) (2015)
Medal record
Men's judo
Representing Germany
World Championships
Gold medal – first place	2017 Budapest	‍–‍81 kg
Bronze medal – third place	2018 Baku	‍–‍81 kg
European Games
Bronze medal – third place	2015 Baku	‍–‍81 kg
European Championships
Bronze medal – third place	2022 Mulhouse	Mixed team
IJF Grand Slam
Bronze medal – third place	2014 Tokyo	‍–‍81 kg
Bronze medal – third place	2015 Tyumen	‍–‍81 kg
IJF Grand Prix
Silver medal – second place	2014 Samsun	‍–‍81 kg
Bronze medal – third place	2014 Düsseldorf	‍–‍81 kg
World Juniors Championships
Gold medal – first place	2010 Agadir	‍–‍73 kg

Profile at external databases
- IJF: 3522
- JudoInside.com: 40385
- Updated on 23 May 2023

Alexander Wieczerzak (born 22 March 1991) is a German judoka.

He won a gold medal at the 2017 World Judo Championships in Budapest.

On 12 November 2022 he won a bronze medal at the 2022 European Mixed Team Judo Championships as part of team Germany.
