= Vedat Albayrak =

Turkish judoka (born 1993)

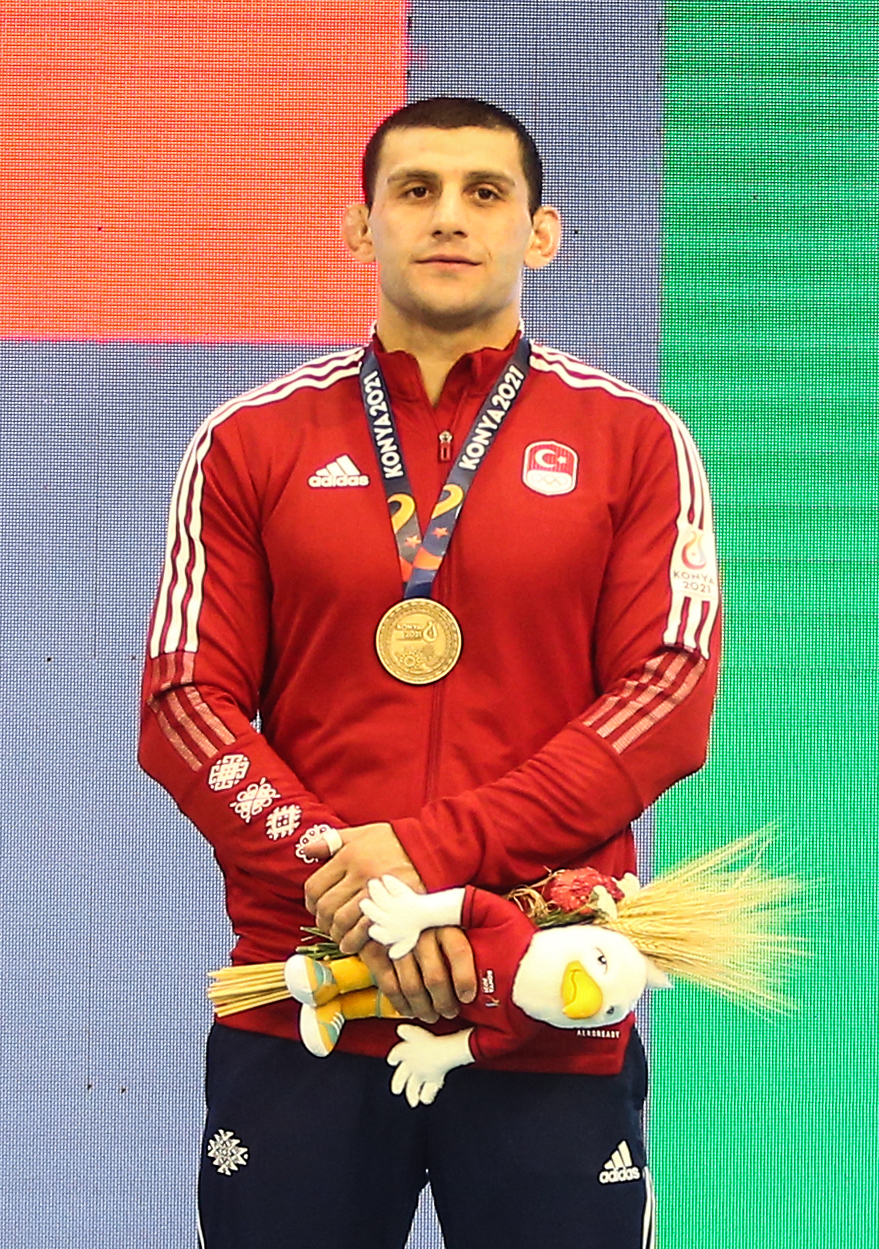
- Albayrak at the 2021 Islamic Solidarity Games

Personal information
- Other names: Roman Moustopoulos
- Born: Vano Revazishvili; 2 March 1993 (age 33) Kokshetau, Kazakhstan
- Occupation: Judoka
- Height: 1.77 m (5 ft 10 in)

Sport
- Country: Greece (until 2016); Turkey (since 2018)
- Sport: Judo
- Weight class: ‍–‍81 kg

Achievements and titles
- Olympic Games: R16 (2024)
- World Champ.: (bronze) (2018)
- European Champ.: (gold) (2021, 2023)
Medal record
Men's judo
Representing Turkey
World Championships
Bronze medal – third place	2018 Baku	‍–‍81 kg
European Championships
Gold medal – first place	2021 Lisbon	‍–‍81 kg
Gold medal – first place	2023 Montpellier	‍–‍81 kg
Bronze medal – third place	2024 Zagreb	‍–‍81 kg
World Masters
Bronze medal – third place	2018 Guangzhou	‍–‍81 kg
Bronze medal – third place	2019 Qingdao	‍–‍81 kg
IJF Grand Slam
Gold medal – first place	2020 Budapest	‍–‍81 kg
Gold medal – first place	2021 Antalya	‍–‍81 kg
Gold medal – first place	2021 Baku	‍–‍81 kg
Gold medal – first place	2025 Tbilisi	‍–‍81 kg
Gold medal – first place	2026 Tbilisi	‍–‍81 kg
Silver medal – second place	2019 Brasilia	‍–‍81 kg
Silver medal – second place	2022 Tel Aviv	‍–‍81 kg
Silver medal – second place	2022 Antalya	‍–‍81 kg
Silver medal – second place	2023 Tel Aviv	‍–‍81 kg
Bronze medal – third place	2018 Osaka	‍–‍81 kg
Bronze medal – third place	2019 Abu Dhabi	‍–‍81 kg
IJF Grand Prix
Gold medal – first place	2018 Agadir	‍–‍81 kg
Gold medal – first place	2018 Antalya	‍–‍81 kg
Silver medal – second place	2018 Tunis	‍–‍81 kg
Silver medal – second place	2019 Marrakesh	‍–‍81 kg
Silver medal – second place	2024 Odivelas	‍–‍81 kg
Bronze medal – third place	2025 Qingdao	‍–‍81 kg
Mediterranean Games
Gold medal – first place	2022 Oran	‍–‍81 kg
Bronze medal – third place	2026 Taranto	‍–‍81 kg
Bronze medal – third place	2026 Taranto	Mixed team
Islamic Solidarity Games
Gold medal – first place	2021 Konya	‍–‍81 kg
Gold medal – first place	2025 Riyadh	‍–‍81 kg
Silver medal – second place	2021 Konya	Men's team
Bronze medal – third place	2025 Riyadh	Mixed team
Representing Greece
World Masters
Bronze medal – third place	2016 Guadalajara	‍–‍81 kg
IJF Grand Prix
Gold medal – first place	2014 Tashkent	‍–‍81 kg
Bronze medal – third place	2014 Budapest	‍–‍81 kg
Bronze medal – third place	2015 Budapest	‍–‍81 kg
Bronze medal – third place	2015 Jeju	‍–‍81 kg
Bronze medal – third place	2016 Havana	‍–‍81 kg
Bronze medal – third place	2016 Tbilisi	‍–‍81 kg
European U23 Championships
Gold medal – first place	2014 Wrocław	‍–‍81 kg
World Juniors Championships
Bronze medal – third place	2013 Ljubljana	‍–‍73 kg
European Junior Championships
Gold medal – first place	2013 Sarajevo	‍–‍73 kg

Profile at external databases
- IJF: 42500, 3416
- JudoInside.com: 51111
- Updated on 1 September 2026

Vedat Albayrak (born Vano Revazishvili on 2 March 1993; Georgian: ვანო რევაზიშვილი) is a Turkish judoka, born in Kokshetau, Kazakhstan. He represented Greece at the 2016 Summer Olympics under the name Roman Moustopoulos and was eliminated in the second round of the men's 81 kg event by Juan Diego Turcios.

Albayrak won a bronze medal at the 2018 World Championships held in Baku, Azerbaijan. He took the gold medal at the 2021 European Championships in Lisbon, Portugal.

He won the silver medal in his event at the 2022 Tel Aviv Grand Slam held in Tel Aviv, Israel.

Albayrak represented Turkey at the 2024 Summer Olympics, competing in the men's 81 kg and mixed team events.
