= Robin Pacek =

Swedish judoka (born 1991)

Personal information
- Born: 17 March 1991 (age 35) Kristianstad, Sweden
- Occupation: Judoka

Sport
- Country: Sweden
- Sport: Judo
- Weight class: ‍–‍81 kg

Achievements and titles
- Olympic Games: R16 (2020)
- World Champ.: R16 (2013, 2014, 2015)
- European Champ.: (bronze) (2016)
Medal record
Men's judo
Representing Sweden
European Championships
Bronze medal – third place	2016 Kazan	‍–‍81 kg
IJF Grand Slam
Bronze medal – third place	2020 Düsseldorf	‍–‍81 kg
IJF Grand Prix
Bronze medal – third place	2013 Jeju	‍–‍81 kg
Bronze medal – third place	2014 Qingdao	‍–‍81 kg
Bronze medal – third place	2018 Budapest	‍–‍81 kg

Profile at external databases
- IJF: 1284
- JudoInside.com: 46384
- Updated on 11 November 2022

Robin Pacek (born 17 March 1991) is a Swedish judoka. He competed at the 2016 Summer Olympics in the men's 81 kg event, in which he was eliminated in the second round by Travis Stevens. He also competed in the 2020 Olympics in Tokyo.

== Personal life ==
Pacek's father Ryszard Pacek was a Polish Greco-Roman wrestler who emigrated to Sweden in the late 1970s. His older brother Martin is also a judoka.
