= Dominik Družeta =

Croatian judoka (born 1996)

Personal information
- Born: 3 June 1996 (age 30)
- Occupation: Judoka

Sport
- Country: Croatia
- Sport: Judo
- Weight class: ‍–‍81 kg

Achievements and titles
- World Champ.: R32 (2017)
- European Champ.: (bronze) (2017)
Medal record
Men's judo
Representing Croatia
European Championships
Bronze medal – third place	2017 Warsaw	‍–‍81 kg
IJF Grand Slam
Silver medal – second place	2021 Baku	‍–‍81 kg
European U23 Championships
Silver medal – second place	2017 Podgorica	‍–‍81 kg
Bronze medal – third place	2015 Bratislava	‍–‍81 kg

Profile at external databases
- IJF: 13540
- JudoInside.com: 73633
- Updated on 11 November 2022

Dominik Družeta (born 3 June 1996) is a Croatian judoka. He is the 2017 European bronze medalist in the ‍–‍81 kg division.
