= Anri Egutidze =

Portuguese judoka (born 1996)

Personal information
- Nationality: Portuguese
- Born: 1 March 1996 (age 30) Georgia
- Occupation: Judoka
- Height: 1.73 m (5 ft 8 in)

Sport
- Country: Portugal
- Sport: Judo
- Weight class: –81 kg
- Club: Benfica

Achievements and titles
- Olympic Games: R32 (2020)
- World Champ.: (bronze) (2021)
- European Champ.: 5th (2018, 2021)
Medal record
Men's judo
Representing Portugal
World Championships
Bronze medal – third place	2021 Budapest	‍–‍81 kg
European Games
Silver medal – second place	2019 Minsk	Mixed team
IJF Grand Slam
Bronze medal – third place	2019 Brasilia	‍–‍81 kg
Bronze medal – third place	2021 Paris	‍–‍90 kg
IJF Grand Prix
Silver medal – second place	2018 Tbilisi	‍–‍81 kg
Bronze medal – third place	2018 Agadir	‍–‍81 kg
Bronze medal – third place	2018 Zagreb	‍–‍81 kg
Bronze medal – third place	2023 Dushanbe	‍–‍81 kg
European Junior Championships
Silver medal – second place	2016 Málaga	‍–‍81 kg

Profile at external databases
- IJF: 13924
- JudoInside.com: 75268
- Updated on 4 June 2023

Anri Egutidze (born 1 March 1996) is a Georgian-born Portuguese judoka. In June 2021, he won one of the bronze medals in the men's 81 kg at the 2021 World Judo Championships held in Budapest, Hungary.

He is one of the bronze medallist of the 2019 Judo Grand Slam Brasilia in the −81 kg class. He competed at the 2020 Summer Olympics in Tokyo where he was eliminated in the second round by the eventual bronze medalist, Shamil Borchashvili of Austria.
