= Ivaylo Ivanov (judoka) =

Bulgarian judoka (born 1994)

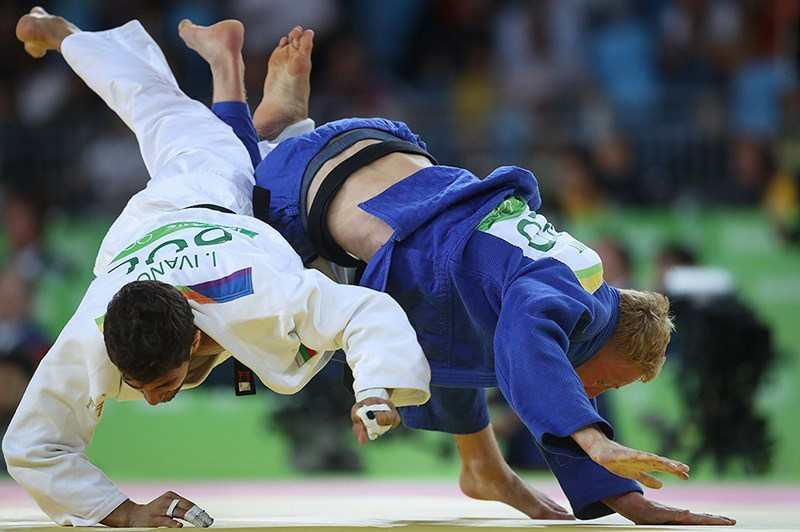
- Ivanov (left) against Frank de Wit during the 2016 Olympics.

Personal information
- Born: 20 July 1994 (age 32) Montana, Bulgaria
- Occupation: Judoka

Sport
- Country: Bulgaria
- Sport: Judo
- Weight class: ‍–‍81 kg, ‍–‍90 kg
- Club: CSKA Sofia

Achievements and titles
- Olympic Games: 7th (2016)
- World Champ.: 7th (2022)
- European Champ.: (silver) (2019, 2020)
Medal record
Men's judo
Representing Bulgaria
European Games
Silver medal – second place	2019 Minsk	‍–‍81 kg
European Championships
Silver medal – second place	2020 Prague	‍–‍81 kg
Bronze medal – third place	2016 Kazan	‍–‍81 kg
Bronze medal – third place	2025 Podgorica	‍–‍90 kg
World Masters
Bronze medal – third place	2021 Doha	‍–‍81 kg
IJF Grand Slam
Gold medal – first place	2015 Abu Dhabi	‍–‍81 kg
Gold medal – first place	2026 Abu Dhabi	‍–‍90 kg
Silver medal – second place	2016 Paris	‍–‍81 kg
Silver medal – second place	2016 Baku	‍–‍81 kg
Silver medal – second place	2019 Baku	‍–‍81 kg
Silver medal – second place	2023 Baku	‍–‍90 kg
Silver medal – second place	2024 Tashkent	‍–‍90 kg
Bronze medal – third place	2016 Tokyo	‍–‍81 kg
Bronze medal – third place	2023 Antalya	‍–‍90 kg
Bronze medal – third place	2024 Baku	‍–‍90 kg
IJF Grand Prix
Gold medal – first place	2016 Samsun	‍–‍81 kg
Gold medal – first place	2018 The Hague	‍–‍81 kg
Gold medal – first place	2019 Marrakesh	‍–‍81 kg
Gold medal – first place	2023 Almada	‍–‍90 kg
Gold medal – first place	2025 Zagreb	‍–‍90 kg
Silver medal – second place	2019 Tel Aviv	‍–‍81 kg
Bronze medal – third place	2015 Qingdao	‍–‍81 kg
Bronze medal – third place	2016 Düsseldorf	‍–‍81 kg
Bronze medal – third place	2017 Düsseldorf	‍–‍81 kg
Bronze medal – third place	2019 Budapest	‍–‍81 kg
European U23 Championships
Gold medal – first place	2013 Samokov	‍–‍81 kg
Silver medal – second place	2015 Bratislava	‍–‍81 kg
European Junior Championships
Bronze medal – third place	2013 Sarajevo	‍–‍81 kg
European Cadet Championships
Gold medal – first place	2010 Teplice	‍–‍73 kg
Military World Games
Gold medal – first place	2019 Wuhan	‍–‍81 kg

Profile at external databases
- IJF: 9316
- JudoInside.com: 57515
- Updated on 1 November 2026

Ivaylo Ivanov (Bulgarian: Ивайло Иванов, born 20 July 1994, Montana, Bulgaria) is a Bulgarian judoka who represented Bulgaria at the 2016 Summer Olympics in Rio de Janeiro, in the Men's -81 kg. In 2020, he won the silver medal in the men's 81 kg event at the 2020 European Judo Championships held in Prague, Czech Republic.

In 2021, he won one of the bronze medals in his event at the 2021 Judo World Masters held in Doha, Qatar.
