= 2025 European Judo Championships – Women's +78 kg =

Judo competition

Judo Women's +78 kg at the 2025 European Judo Championships
- Venue: Morača Sports Center
- Location: Podgorica, Montenegro
- Date: 26 April 2025
- Competitors: 25 from 18 nations

Medalists
gold medal	Romane Dicko (5th title)	France
silver medal	Raz Hershko	Israel
bronze medal	Asya Tavano	Italy
bronze medal	Elis Startseva

Competition at external databases
- Links: IJF • JudoInside

The women's +78 kg competition at the 2025 European Judo Championships was held at the Morača Sports Center in Podgorica, Montenegro on 26 April 2025.

== Results ==
=== Finals ===
Semi-finals
(France) Romane Dicko	001
(France) Léa Fontaine	000 (yellow card)
(Israel) Raz Hershko	021
(Italy) Asya Tavano	000

Final
(France) Romane Dicko	020 (yellow card)
(Israel) Raz Hershko	000 (yellow card)

=== Repechage ===
Repechage
(International Judo Federation) Mariia Ivanova	000
(Netherlands) Marit Kamps	010
(International Judo Federation) Elis Startseva	100
(Turkey) Hilal Öztürk	001

Bronze medal
(Netherlands) Marit Kamps	000
(Italy) Asya Tavano	100
Elis Startseva	100
(France) Léa Fontaine	000 (yellow card)

=== Pool A ===
First round
~~(Croatia) Helena Vuković~~	000
(Israel) Yuli Alma Mishiner	100
(Netherlands) Karen Stevenson	000
(International Judo Federation) Mariia Ivanova	100 (yellow card)
(Georgia (country)) Sophio Somkhishvili	101
(Azerbaijan) Nigar Suleymanova	000

Round of 16
(France) Romane Dicko	020 (yellow card)
(Israel) Yuli Alma Mishiner	000
(International Judo Federation) Mariia Ivanova	100
(Georgia (country)) Sophio Somkhishvili	000

Quarter-finals
(France) Romane Dicko	020
(International Judo Federation) Mariia Ivanova	000

=== Pool B ===
First round
(Moldova) Oxana Diacenco	000
(Germany) Samira Bouizgarne	100
(Ukraine) Ruslana Bulavina	000 (yellow card)
(Italy) Erica Simonetti	001

Round of 16
(Netherlands) Marit Kamps	100
(Germany) Samira Bouizgarne	000
(France) Léa Fontaine	100
(Italy) Erica Simonetti	000

Quarter-finals
(Netherlands) Marit Kamps	000 (yellow card)
(France) Léa Fontaine	020

=== Pool C ===
First round
(Belgium) Gabrielle Bouvier	000
(Croatia) Tina Radić	001
(Montenegro) Jovana Mrvaljević	000 (yellow card)
(Austria) Maria Höllwart	100

Round of 16
(Israel) Raz Hershko	020
(Croatia) Tina Radić	000
(International Judo Federation) Elis Startseva	100 (yellow card)
(Austria) Maria Höllwart	000

Quarter-finals
(Israel) Raz Hershko	002 (yellow card)
(International Judo Federation) Elis Startseva	001 (yellow card)

=== Pool D ===
First round
(Serbia) Milica Žabić	100
(Poland) Urszula Hofman	000
(Estonia) Emma-Melis Aktas	020
(Ukraine) Khrystyna Homan	000 (yellow card)

Round of 16
(Italy) Asya Tavano	100 (yellow card)
(Serbia) Milica Žabić	000
(Turkey) Hilal Öztürk	001
(Estonia) Emma-Melis Aktas	000 (yellow card)

Quarter-finals
(Italy) Asya Tavano	100 (yellow card)
(Turkey) Hilal Öztürk	000 (yellow card)
