= 2026 World Judo Championships – Women's +78 kg =

Judo competition

Judo Women's +78 kg at the 2026 World Judo Championships
- Venue: National Gymnastics Arena
- Location: Baku, Azerbaijan
- Date: 10 October 2026
- Competitors: 34 from 27 nations
- Total prize money: €57,000

Medalists
| gold medal | Lee Hyeon-ji (1st title) | South Korea |
| silver medal | Romane Dicko | France |
| bronze medal | Mariia Ivanova | Russia |
| bronze medal | Raz Hershko | Israel |

Competition at external databases
- Links: IJF • JudoInside

The women's +78 kg event at the 2026 World Judo Championships was held at the National Gymnastics Arena in Baku, Azerbaijan on 10 October 2026.

== Results ==
=== Finals ===
Semi-finals
(Israel) Raz Hershko | 000
(South Korea) Lee Hyeon-ji | 100
(Russia) Mariia Ivanova | 000 (yellow card)
(France) Romane Dicko | 100

Final
(South Korea) Lee Hyeon-ji | 020 (yellow card)
(France) Romane Dicko | 000

=== Repechage ===
Repechage
(Brazil) Beatriz Souza | 000
(Italy) Asya Tavano | 101
~~(Japan) Mao Arai~~
(Croatia) Helena Vuković | w/o

Bronze medal
(Italy) Asya Tavano | 000
(Russia) Mariia Ivanova | 101
(Croatia) Helena Vuković | 000 (yellow card)
(Israel) Raz Hershko | 100 (yellow card)

=== Pool A ===
First round
(Japan) Akira Sone | 000 (yellow card)
(Brazil) Beatriz Souza | 100 (yellow card)

Round of 32
(Israel) Raz Hershko | 100
(Chinese Taipei) Chang Ling-fang | 000 (yellow card)
(Estonia) Emma-Melis Aktas | 001 (yellow card)
(Russia) Elis Startseva | 000 (yellow card)
(China) Niu Xinran | 000
(Brazil) Beatriz Souza | 010 (yellow card)
(Uzbekistan) Umida Nigmatova | 010 (yellow card)
(Mongolia) Dambadarjaagiin Nominzul | 000 (yellow card)

Round of 16
(Israel) Raz Hershko | 001 (yellow card)
(Estonia) Emma-Melis Aktas | 000 (yellow card)
(Brazil) Beatriz Souza | 100 (yellow card)
(Uzbekistan) Umida Nigmatova | 000 (yellow card)

Quarter-finals
(Israel) Raz Hershko | 101
(Brazil) Beatriz Souza | 000

=== Pool B ===
First round

Round of 32
(South Korea) Lee Hyeon-ji | 100
(Dominican Republic) Moira Morillo | 000
(Venezuela) Karen León | 020
(Turkey) Hilal Öztürk | 000
(Italy) Asya Tavano | 002
(Azerbaijan) Madina Kaisinova | 000
(Belgium) Gabrielle Bouvier | 100
(Kazakhstan) Kamila Berlikash | 000

Round of 16
(South Korea) Lee Hyeon-ji | 100
(Venezuela) Karen León | 000
(Italy) Asya Tavano | 100 (yellow card)
(Belgium) Gabrielle Bouvier | 000

Quarter-finals
(South Korea) Lee Hyeon-ji | 100
(Italy) Asya Tavano | 000

=== Pool C ===
First round
(New Zealand) Sydnee Andrews | 100
(Cameroon) Richelle Soppi Mbella | 000 (yellow card)

Round of 32
(France) Léa Fontaine | 101
(New Zealand) Sydnee Andrews | 000 (yellow card)
(Georgia (country)) Sophio Somkhishvili | 000
(Russia) Mariia Ivanova | 100
(Japan) Mao Arai | 100
(Italy) Erica Simonetti | 000
(Kazakhstan) Akerke Ramazanova | 000
(Egypt) Safa Soliman | 100

Round of 16
(France) Léa Fontaine | 001
(Russia) Mariia Ivanova | 101
(Japan) Mao Arai | 010
(Egypt) Safa Soliman | 000

Quarter-finals
(Russia) Mariia Ivanova | 100
(Japan) Mao Arai | 000

=== Pool D ===
First round

Round of 32
(France) Romane Dicko | 110 (yellow card)
(Cuba) Dayanara Curbelo | 000
(Nicaragua) Izayana Marenco | 000
(Uzbekistan) Iriskhon Kurbanbaeva | 100 (yellow card)
(Croatia) Helena Vuković | 001
(Austria) Maria Höllwart | 000
(China) Ayiman Jinesinuer | 020
(Portugal) Rochele Nunes | 000

Round of 16
(France) Romane Dicko | 101
(Uzbekistan) Iriskhon Kurbanbaeva | 000 (yellow card)
(Croatia) Helena Vuković | 101
(China) Ayiman Jinesinuer | 001

Quarter-finals
(France) Romane Dicko | 020
(Croatia) Helena Vuković | 000

== Prize money ==
The sums listed bring the total prizes awarded to €57,000 for the individual event.

| Medal | Total | Judoka | Coach |
|---|---|---|---|
| Gold | €26,000 | €20,800 | €5,200 |
| Silver | €15,000 | €12,000 | €3,000 |
| Bronze | €8,000 | €6,400 | €1,600 |
