= 2025 Judo Grand Prix Qingdao =

Judo Competition

Judo 2025 Judo Grand Prix Qingdao
- Venue: Qingdao Conson Stadium
- Location: Qingdao, China
- Dates: 26–28 September 2025
- Competitors: 207 from 27 nations
- Total prize money: €98,000

Competition at external databases
- Links: IJF • JudoInside

The 2025 Judo Grand Prix Qingdao was held at the Conson Stadium in Qingdao, China from 26 to 28 September 2025 as part of the IJF World Tour.

== Medal summary ==
=== Men's events ===
Event	Gold	Silver	Bronze
Extra-lightweight (−60 kg)	Hayato Kondo (JPN)	Lee Ha-rim (KOR)	Taiki Nakamura (JPN)
Extra-lightweight (−60 kg)	Hayato Kondo (JPN)	Lee Ha-rim (KOR)	Byambasürengiin Sükhbat (MGL)
Half-lightweight (−66 kg)	Yondonperenlein Baskhüü (MGL)	Obid Dzhebov (TJK)	Ryoma Tanaka (JPN)
Half-lightweight (−66 kg)	Yondonperenlein Baskhüü (MGL)	Obid Dzhebov (TJK)	Kim Chann-yeong (KOR)
Lightweight (−73 kg)	Yudai Tanaka (JPN)	Shakhram Ahadov (UZB)	Shamil Zilfikarov (IJF)
Lightweight (−73 kg)	Yudai Tanaka (JPN)	Shakhram Ahadov (UZB)	Ejder Toktay (TUR)
Half-middleweight (−81 kg)	Yoshito Hojo (JPN)	Cha Xinglong (CHN)	Askerbii Gerbekov (BHR)
Half-middleweight (−81 kg)	Yoshito Hojo (JPN)	Cha Xinglong (CHN)	Vedat Albayrak (TUR)
Middleweight (−90 kg)	Astemir Abazov (IJF)	Vlad Vişan (ROU)	Gergely Nerpel (HUN)
Middleweight (−90 kg)	Astemir Abazov (IJF)	Vlad Vişan (ROU)	Péter Sáfrány (HUN)
Half-heavyweight (−100 kg)	Niyaz Bilalov (IJF)	Zsombor Vég (HUN)	Dzhakhongir Madzhidov (TJK)
Half-heavyweight (−100 kg)	Niyaz Bilalov (IJF)	Zsombor Vég (HUN)	Dzhafar Kostoev (UAE)
Heavyweight (+100 kg)	Batkhuyagiin Gonchigsüren (MGL)	Márius Fízeľ (SVK)	Lee Seung-yeob (KOR)
Heavyweight (+100 kg)	Batkhuyagiin Gonchigsüren (MGL)	Márius Fízeľ (SVK)	Li Haiyang (CHN)

=== Women's events ===
Event	Gold	Silver	Bronze
Extra-lightweight (−48 kg)	Zhuang Wenna (CHN)	Mary Dee Vargas (CHI)	Ganbaataryn Narantsetseg (MGL)
Extra-lightweight (−48 kg)	Zhuang Wenna (CHN)	Mary Dee Vargas (CHI)	Shirine Boukli (FRA)
Half-lightweight (−52 kg)	Rin Takeuchi (JPN)	Kim Min-jeong (KOR)	Hwang Sur-yeon (KOR)
Half-lightweight (−52 kg)	Rin Takeuchi (JPN)	Kim Min-jeong (KOR)	Róza Gyertyás (HUN)
Lightweight (−57 kg)	Momo Tamaoki (JPN)	Zhou Jia (CHN)	Lkhagvasürengiin Sosorbaram (MGL)
Lightweight (−57 kg)	Momo Tamaoki (JPN)	Zhou Jia (CHN)	Kim Hyon-a (PRK)
Half-middleweight (−63 kg)	Manon Deketer (FRA)	Lkhagvatogoogiin Enkhriilen (MGL)	Angelika Szymańska (POL)
Half-middleweight (−63 kg)	Manon Deketer (FRA)	Lkhagvatogoogiin Enkhriilen (MGL)	Kim Ji-hye (PRK)
Middleweight (−70 kg)	Lara Cvjetko (CRO)	Aina Laura Rasoanaivo Razafy (MAD)	Feng Yingying (CHN)
Middleweight (−70 kg)	Lara Cvjetko (CRO)	Aina Laura Rasoanaivo Razafy (MAD)	Melkia Auchecorne (FRA)
Half-heavyweight (−78 kg)	Audrey Tcheuméo (FRA)	Yelyzaveta Lytvynenko (UAE)	Emma Reid (GBR)
Half-heavyweight (−78 kg)	Audrey Tcheuméo (FRA)	Yelyzaveta Lytvynenko (UAE)	Mizuki Hasegawa (JPN)
Heavyweight (+78 kg)	Lee Hyeon-ji (KOR)	Léa Fontaine (FRA)	Helena Vuković (CRO)
Heavyweight (+78 kg)	Lee Hyeon-ji (KOR)	Léa Fontaine (FRA)	Liang Ye (CHN)

=== Medal table ===
* Host nation (China)

Rank	Nation	Gold	Silver	Bronze	Total
1	Japan (JPN)	5	0	3	8
2	Mongolia (MGL)	2	1	3	6
3	France (FRA)	2	1	2	5
4	International Judo Federation (IJF)	2	0	1	3
5	China (CHN)*	1	2	3	6
5	South Korea (KOR)	1	2	3	6
7	Croatia (CRO)	1	0	1	2
8	Hungary (HUN)	0	1	3	4
9	Tajikistan (TJK)	0	1	1	2
9	United Arab Emirates (UAE)	0	1	1	2
11	Chile (CHI)	0	1	0	1
11	Madagascar (MAD)	0	1	0	1
11	Romania (ROU)	0	1	0	1
11	Slovakia (SVK)	0	1	0	1
11	Uzbekistan (UZB)	0	1	0	1
16	North Korea (PRK)	0	0	2	2
16	Turkey (TUR)	0	0	2	2
18	Bahrain (BHR)	0	0	1	1
18	Great Britain (GBR)	0	0	1	1
18	Poland (POL)	0	0	1	1
Totals (20 entries)		14	14	28	56

== Prize money ==
The sums written are per medalist, bringing the total prizes awarded to €98,000. (retrieved from:)

Medal	Total	Judoka	Coach
Gold	€3,000	€2,400	€600
Silver	€2,000	€1,600	€400
Bronze	€1,000	€800	€200
