= Borchashvili =

Borchashvili is a surname. Notable people with the name include:

- Shamil Borchashvili (born 1995), Austrian Judoka
- Wachid Borchashvili (born 1998), Austrian Judoka
