= 2023 European Judo Championships – Women's +78 kg =

Judo competition

Judo Women's +78 kg at the 2023 European Judo Championships
- Venue: Sud de France Arena
- Location: Montpellier, France
- Date: 5 November 2023
- Competitors: 20 from 16 nations

Medalists
gold medal	Romane Dicko (4th title)	France
silver medal	Raz Hershko	Israel
bronze medal	Marit Kamps	Netherlands
bronze medal	Asya Tavano	Italy

Competition at external databases
- Links: IJF • JudoInside

The women's +78 kg event at the 2023 European Judo Championships was held at the Sud de France Arena in Montpellier, France on 5 November 2023.

== Results ==
=== Finals ===
Semi-finals
(Israel) Raz Hershko	02
(Italy) Asya Tavano	00
(France) Romane Dicko	10
(Netherlands) Marit Kamps	00 (yellow card)

Final
(Israel) Raz Hershko	00
(France) Romane Dicko	10

=== Repechage ===
Repechage
(Croatia) Helena Vuković	00
(Turkey) Kayra Ozdemir	10
(Netherlands) Karen Stevenson	01 (yellow card)
(Ukraine) Khrystyna Homan	00

Bronze medal
(Turkey) Kayra Ozdemir	00
(Netherlands) Marit Kamps	01
(Netherlands) Karen Stevenson	00 (yellow card)
(Italy) Asya Tavano	01 (yellow card)

=== Pool A ===
First round
(Germany) Renée Lucht	00
(Croatia) Helena Vuković	10

Round of 16
(Israel) Raz Hershko	10
Mahboubeh Barbari Zharfi	00 (yellow card)
(Georgia (country)) Sophio Somkhishvili	00
(Croatia) Helena Vuković	10

Quarter-finals
(Israel) Raz Hershko	10
(Croatia) Helena Vuković	00 (yellow card)

=== Pool B ===
First round
(Bosnia and Herzegovina) Larisa Cerić	00 (yellow card)
(Italy) Asya Tavano	01

Round of 16
(Turkey) Kayra Ozdemir	02
(Ukraine) Ruslana Bulavina	00
(Serbia) Milica Žabić	00
(Italy) Asya Tavano	10

Quarter-finals
(Turkey) Kayra Ozdemir	00 (yellow card)
(Italy) Asya Tavano	01

=== Pool C ===
First round
(Germany) Samira Bouizgarne	10
(Croatia) Tina Radić	00

Round of 16
(France) Romane Dicko	02
(Austria) Maria Höllwart	00 (yellow card)
(Netherlands) Karen Stevenson	10
(Germany) Samira Bouizgarne	00

Quarter-finals
(France) Romane Dicko	10
(Netherlands) Karen Stevenson	00

=== Pool D ===
First round
(Ukraine) Khrystyna Homan	02 (yellow card)
(Poland) Kinga Wolszczak	00

Round of 16
(Portugal) Rochele Nunes	00
(Ukraine) Khrystyna Homan	10
(Netherlands) Marit Kamps	10
(Lithuania) Sandra Jablonskytė	00 (yellow card)

Quarter-finals
(Ukraine) Khrystyna Homan	00
(Netherlands) Marit Kamps	10
