= 2026 Judo Grand Prix Qingdao =

Judo Competition

Judo 2026 Judo Grand Prix Qingdao
- Venue: Qingdao Conson Stadium
- Location: Qingdao, China
- Dates: 26–28 June 2026
- Competitors: 500 from 57 nations
- Total prize money: €98,000

Competition at external databases
- Links: IJF • JudoInside

The 2026 Judo Grand Prix Qingdao was held at the Conson Stadium in Qingdao, China from 26 to 28 June 2026 as part of the IJF World Tour and during the 2028 Summer Olympics qualification period.

== Medal summary ==
=== Men's events ===
Event	Gold	Silver	Bronze
Extra-lightweight (−60 kg)	Hayato Kondo (JPN)	Charlie Ayre (GBR)	Ayub Bliev (RUS)
Extra-lightweight (−60 kg)	Hayato Kondo (JPN)	Charlie Ayre (GBR)	Ahmad Yusifov (AZE)
Half-lightweight (−66 kg)	Hifumi Abe (JPN)	Gusman Kyrgyzbayev (KAZ)	Kelvin Ray (FRA)
Half-lightweight (−66 kg)	Hifumi Abe (JPN)	Gusman Kyrgyzbayev (KAZ)	Ronald Lima (BRA)
Lightweight (−73 kg)	Tatsuki Ishihara (JPN)	Shakhram Ahadov (UZB)	Makhmadbek Makhmadbekov (UAE)
Lightweight (−73 kg)	Tatsuki Ishihara (JPN)	Shakhram Ahadov (UZB)	Victor Skerlev (BUL)
Half-middleweight (−81 kg)	Zelim Tckaev (AZE)	Bernd Fasching (AUT)	Manuel Parlati (ITA)
Half-middleweight (−81 kg)	Zelim Tckaev (AZE)	Bernd Fasching (AUT)	Hidayat Heydarov (AZE)
Middleweight (−90 kg)	Yahor Varapayeu (BLR)	Guilherme Schimidt (BRA)	Murad Fatiyev (AZE)
Middleweight (−90 kg)	Yahor Varapayeu (BLR)	Guilherme Schimidt (BRA)	Goki Tajima (JPN)
Half-heavyweight (−100 kg)	Adam Sangariev (RUS)	Giovani Ferreira (BRA)	Huang Fuchun (CHN)
Half-heavyweight (−100 kg)	Adam Sangariev (RUS)	Giovani Ferreira (BRA)	Idar Bifov (RUS)
Heavyweight (+100 kg)	Tamerlan Bashaev (RUS)	Hyōga Ōta (JPN)	Lukáš Krpálek (CZE)
Heavyweight (+100 kg)	Tamerlan Bashaev (RUS)	Hyōga Ōta (JPN)	Martti Puumalainen (FIN)

=== Women's events ===
Event	Gold	Silver	Bronze
Extra-lightweight (−48 kg)	Zhuang Wenna (CHN)	Tuğçe Beder (TUR)	Kristina Dudina (RUS)
Extra-lightweight (−48 kg)	Zhuang Wenna (CHN)	Tuğçe Beder (TUR)	Hui Xinran (CHN)
Half-lightweight (−52 kg)	Kokoro Fujishiro (JPN)	Mascha Ballhaus (GER)	Ayumi Leiva Sánchez (ESP)
Half-lightweight (−52 kg)	Kokoro Fujishiro (JPN)	Mascha Ballhaus (GER)	Larissa Pimenta (BRA)
Lightweight (−57 kg)	Maysa Pardayeva (TKM)	Martha Fawaz (FRA)	Irina Zueva (RUS)
Lightweight (−57 kg)	Maysa Pardayeva (TKM)	Martha Fawaz (FRA)	Momo Tamaoki (JPN)
Half-middleweight (−63 kg)	Narumi Tanioka (JPN)	Kim Ji-su (KOR)	Friederike Stolze (GER)
Half-middleweight (−63 kg)	Narumi Tanioka (JPN)	Kim Ji-su (KOR)	Laura Fazliu (KOS)
Middleweight (−70 kg)	Lara Cvjetko (CRO)	Tamara Lishchenko (RUS)	Miriam Butkereit (GER)
Middleweight (−70 kg)	Lara Cvjetko (CRO)	Tamara Lishchenko (RUS)	Aleksandra Andrić (SRB)
Half-heavyweight (−78 kg)	Anna Monta Olek (GER)	Mizuki Sugimura (JPN)	Tuana Gülenay (TUR)
Half-heavyweight (−78 kg)	Anna Monta Olek (GER)	Mizuki Sugimura (JPN)	Metka Lobnik (SLO)
Heavyweight (+78 kg)	Elis Startseva (RUS)	Léa Fontaine (FRA)	Helena Vuković (CRO)
Heavyweight (+78 kg)	Elis Startseva (RUS)	Léa Fontaine (FRA)	Ayiman Jinesinuer (CHN)

=== Medal table ===
* Host nation (China)

Rank	Nation	Gold	Silver	Bronze	Total
1	Japan (JPN)	5	2	2	9
2	Russia (RUS)	3	1	4	8
3	Germany (GER)	1	1	2	4
4	Azerbaijan (AZE)	1	0	3	4
4	China (CHN)*	1	0	3	4
6	Croatia (CRO)	1	0	1	2
7	Belarus (BLR)	1	0	0	1
7	Turkmenistan (TKM)	1	0	0	1
9	Brazil (BRA)	0	2	2	4
10	France (FRA)	0	2	1	3
11	Turkey (TUR)	0	1	1	2
12	Austria (AUT)	0	1	0	1
12	Great Britain (GBR)	0	1	0	1
12	Kazakhstan (KAZ)	0	1	0	1
12	South Korea (KOR)	0	1	0	1
12	Uzbekistan (UZB)	0	1	0	1
17	Bulgaria (BUL)	0	0	1	1
17	Czech Republic (CZE)	0	0	1	1
17	Finland (FIN)	0	0	1	1
17	Italy (ITA)	0	0	1	1
17	Kosovo (KOS)	0	0	1	1
17	Serbia (SRB)	0	0	1	1
17	Slovenia (SLO)	0	0	1	1
17	Spain (ESP)	0	0	1	1
17	United Arab Emirates (UAE)	0	0	1	1
Totals (25 entries)		14	14	28	56

== Prize money ==
The sums written are per medalist, bringing the total prizes awarded to €98,000. (retrieved from:)

Medal	Total	Judoka	Coach
Gold	€3,000	€2,400	€600
Silver	€2,000	€1,600	€400
Bronze	€1,000	€800	€200
