= 2024 European Judo Championships – Women's +78 kg =

Judo competition

Judo Women's +78 kg at the 2024 European Judo Championships
- Venue: Arena Zagreb
- Location: Zagreb, Croatia
- Date: 27 April
- Competitors: 23 from 18 nations

Medalists
gold medal	Raz Hershko (1st title)	Israel
silver medal	Julia Tolofua	France
bronze medal	Léa Fontaine	France
bronze medal	Kayra Ozdemir	Turkey

Competition at external databases
- Links: IJF • JudoInside

The women's +78 kg competition at the 2024 European Judo Championships was held on 27 April at the Arena Zagreb.

== Results ==
=== Finals ===
Semi-finals
Raz Hershko (ISR)	10
Kayra Ozdemir (TUR)	00
Julia Tolofua (FRA)	10
Rochele Nunes (POR)	00

Final
Raz Hershko (ISR)	10
Julia Tolofua (FRA)	00

=== Repechage ===
Repechage
Elis Startseva (AIN)	00
Léa Fontaine (FRA)	02
Larisa Cerić (BIH)	00
Hilal Öztürk (TUR)	01

Bronze medal
Léa Fontaine (FRA)	01
Rochele Nunes (POR)	00
Hilal Öztürk (TUR)	00
Kayra Ozdemir (TUR)	10

=== Pool A ===
First round
Erica Simonetti (ITA)	00
Karen Stevenson (NED)	10 (yellow card)
Justina Kmieliauskaitė (LTU)	00 (yellow card)
Elis Startseva (AIN)	10

Round of 16
Raz Hershko (ISR)	10
Karen Stevenson (NED)	00
Milica Žabić (SRB)	01
Elis Startseva (AIN)	02 (yellow card)

Quarter-finals
Raz Hershko (ISR)	01
Elis Startseva (AIN)	00

=== Pool B ===
First round
Maria Höllwart (AUT)	10
Khrystyna Homan (UKR)	00

Round of 16
Kayra Ozdemir (TUR)	10 (yellow card)
Maria Höllwart (AUT)	00
Léa Fontaine (FRA)	10
Renée Lucht (GER)	00

Quarter-finals
Kayra Ozdemir (TUR)	01 (yellow card)
Léa Fontaine (FRA)	00

=== Pool C ===
First round
Sophio Somkhishvili (GEO)	11
Sandra Jablonskytė (LTU)	00
Larisa Cerić (BIH)	10
Helena Vuković (CRO)	00

Round of 16
Julia Tolofua (FRA)	11
Sophio Somkhishvili (GEO)	00
Marit Kamps (NED)	00
Larisa Cerić (BIH)	10 (yellow card)

Quarter-finals
Julia Tolofua (FRA)	01
Larisa Cerić (BIH)	00

=== Pool D ===
First round
Ruslana Bulavina (UKR)11s1
Urszula Hofman (POL)	00
Oxana Diacenco (MDA)	10
Mahboubeh Barbari Zharfi (IRT)	00

Round of 16
Rochele Nunes (POR)	02 (yellow card)
Ruslana Bulavina (UKR)	00 (yellow card)
Hilal Öztürk (TUR)	10 (yellow card)
Oxana Diacenco (MDA)	00

Quarter-finals
Rochele Nunes (POR)	10
Hilal Öztürk (TUR)	00
