= Lachlan Moorhead =

British judoka (born 2000)

Personal information
- Born: 15 May 2000 (age 26) Penistone, England
- Occupation: Judoka

Sport
- Sport: Judo
- Weight class: ‍–‍81 kg
- Club: Sheffield Judo Club
- Coached by: Matt Moorhead

Achievements and titles
- World Champ.: R16 (2023)
- European Champ.: R16 (2022, 2023)
- Commonwealth Games: (gold) (2022)
Medal record
Men's judo
Representing Great Britain
IJF Grand Slam
| Bronze medal – third place | 2021 Abu Dhabi | ‍–‍81 kg |
| Bronze medal – third place | 2026 Budapest | ‍–‍90 kg |
IJF Grand Prix
| Silver medal – second place | 2022 Perth | ‍–‍81 kg |
| Bronze medal – third place | 2023 Perth | ‍–‍81 kg |
European Junior Championships
| Bronze medal – third place | 2019 Vantaa | ‍–‍81 kg |
Representing England
Commonwealth Games
| Gold medal – first place | 2022 Birmingham | ‍–‍81 kg |

Profile at external databases
- IJF: 37057
- JudoInside.com: 102355
- Updated on 13 September 2026

Lachlan Moorhead (born 15 May 2000) is a British judoka. He is British champion and won gold in the Men's 81 kg at the 2022 Commonwealth Games.

== Early life and education ==
Moorhead is from Penistone, where his father, who coached him initially, started a judo club, and where he attended Penistone Grammar School. He is a member of Sheffield Judo Club. He studies business management at the University of Birmingham.

== Career ==
In 2019, Moorhead won bronze medals at the European Junior Championships and the Kaunas European Junior Cup. In 2021, competing as an adult, he won bronze at the Abu Dhabi Grand Slam. Also in 2021, Moorhead became a British champion after winning the half-middleweight division at the British Judo Championships.

At the 2022 Commonwealth Games, he won the gold medal in the 81 kg class, defeating Canadian François Gauthier-Drapeau in the final.

In December 2025, Moorhead won his second British half-middleweight title at the British Judo Championships.

== Personal life ==
Inspired by the death of Craig Fallon when he was 11, Moorhead is an ambassador for If U Care Share, a charity which raises awareness of male suicide and mental health issues.
