= 2022 European Judo Championships – Women's +78 kg =

Judo competition

Judo Women's +78 kg at the 2022 European Judo Championships
- Venue: Armeets Arena
- Location: Sofia, Bulgaria
- Date: 1 May
- Competitors: 16 from 14 nations

Medalists
gold medal	Romane Dicko (3rd title)	France
silver medal	Raz Hershko	Israel
bronze medal	Asya Tavano	Italy
bronze medal	Sebile Akbulut	Turkey

Competition at external databases
- Links: IJF • JudoInside

The women's +78 kg competition at the 2022 European Judo Championships was held on 1 May at the Armeets Arena.

== Results ==
=== Final ===
Final
Romane Dicko (FRA)	11
Raz Hershko (ISR)	00

=== Repechage ===
Repechage
Kinga Wolszczak (POL)	10
Urška Torkar (SLO)	00
Hilal Öztürk (TUR)	00
Marit Kamps (NED)	10

Bronze medal
Kinga Wolszczak (POL)	00
Asya Tavano (ITA)	10
Marit Kamps (NED)	00
Sebile Akbulut (TUR)	01

=== Top half ===
Round of 16
Romane Dicko (FRA)	10
Markéta Paulusová (CZE)	01
Milica Žabić (SRB)	00
Kinga Wolszczak (POL)	11
Larisa Cerić (BIH)	00
Urška Torkar (SLO)	01
Ivana Maranić (CRO)	00
Sebile Akbulut (TUR)	11

Quarterfinals
Romane Dicko (FRA)	10
Kinga Wolszczak (POL)	00
Urška Torkar (SLO)	00
Sebile Akbulut (TUR)	10

Semifinals
Romane Dicko (FRA)	10
Sebile Akbulut (TUR)	00

=== Bottom half ===
Round of 16
Raz Hershko (ISR)	10
Tina Radić (CRO)	00
Hilal Öztürk (TUR)	11
Gabriela Gigova (BUL)	00
Marit Kamps (NED)	10
Sophio Somkhishvili (GEO)	00
Sandra Jablonskytė (LTU)	00
Asya Tavano (ITA)	10

Quarterfinals
Raz Hershko (ISR)	10
Hilal Öztürk (TUR)	00
Marit Kamps (NED)	00
Asya Tavano (ITA)	10

Semifinals
Raz Hershko (ISR)	10
Asya Tavano (ITA)	00
