= Mariia Ivanova =

Russian judoka (born 2003)

Personal information
- Native name: Мари́я Евге́ньевна Ивано́ва
- Full name: Maria Yevgenyevna Ivanova
- Born: 8 March 2003 (age 23)
- Occupation: Judoka

Sport
- Country: Russia
- Sport: Judo
- Weight class: +78 kg

Achievements and titles
- World Champ.: (bronze) (2026)
- European Champ.: 7th (2025)
Medal record
Women's judo
Representing Russia
World Championships
Bronze medal – third place	2026 Baku	+78 kg
IJF Grand Slam
Bronze medal – third place	2026 Dushanbe	+78 kg
Bronze medal – third place	2026 Lausanne	+78 kg
Representing the IJF
European Championships
Bronze medal – third place	2025 Podgorica	Mixed team

Profile at external databases
- IJF: 59731
- JudoInside.com: 146326
- Updated on 11 October 2026

Maria Yevgenyevna Ivanova (Russian: Мари́я Евге́ньевна Ивано́ва; born 8 March 2003) is a Russian judoka.

== Career ==
In April 2025, she represented the International Judo Federation (IJF) at the 2025 European Judo Championships and won a bronze medal in the mixed team event.

In May 2026, she competed at the 2026 Judo Grand Slam Dushanbe and won a bronze medal in the +78 kg category, her first career Judo Grand Slam medal. In October 2026, she competed at the 2026 World Judo Championships and advanced to the semifinals in the +78 kg category, losing to France's Romane Dicko. In the repechage she defeated Italy's Asya Tavano and won a bronze medal.
