= 2023 World Judo Championships – Men's 81 kg =

Judo competition

Judo Men's 81 kg at the 2023 World Judo Championships
- Venue: Ali Bin Hamad Al Attiya Arena
- Location: Doha, Qatar
- Date: 10 May 2023
- Competitors: 51 from 41 nations
- Total prize money: €57,000

Medalists
gold medal	Tato Grigalashvili (2nd title)	Georgia
silver medal	Matthias Casse	Belgium
bronze medal	Takanori Nagase	Japan
bronze medal	Lee Joon-hwan	South Korea

Competition at external databases
- Links: IJF • JudoInside

The Men's 81 kg event at the 2023 World Judo Championships was held at the Ali Bin Hamad al-Attiyah Arena in Doha, Qatar on 10 May 2023.

== Results ==
=== Finals ===
Semi-finals
(Georgia (country)) Tato Grigalashvili	02
(South Korea) Lee Joon-hwan	00
(Belgium) Matthias Casse	10
(Israel) Sagi Muki	00

Final
(Georgia (country)) Tato Grigalashvili	01
(Belgium) Matthias Casse	00

=== Repechage ===
Repechage
(Austria) Wachid Borchashvili	00
(Japan) Takanori Nagase	10
(Hungary) Attila Ungvári	00
(Canada) François Gauthier-Drapeau	10

Bronze medal
(Japan) Takanori Nagase	10
(Israel) Sagi Muki	00
(Canada) François Gauthier-Drapeau	00
(South Korea) Lee Joon-hwan	10

=== Pool A ===
First round
(Moldova) Mihail Latișev	00
(Morocco) Achraf Moutii	10
Sibghatullah Arab	00
(Tajikistan) Shodmon Rizoev	02
(Poland) Paweł Drzymał	02
(United States) Kell Berliner	00
(United Arab Emirates) Nugzar Tatalashvili	00
(Netherlands) Frank de Wit	10
(Uruguay) Alain Mikael Aprahamian	00
(Austria) Wachid Borchashvili	10

Round of 32
(Georgia (country)) Tato Grigalashvili	10
(Morocco) Achraf Moutii	00
(Tajikistan) Shodmon Rizoev	01
(Portugal) Anri Egutidze	00
(Turkey) Vedat Albayrak	10
(Poland) Paweł Drzymał	00
(Netherlands) Frank de Wit	00
(Austria) Wachid Borchashvili	01

Round of 16
(Georgia (country)) Tato Grigalashvili	11
(Tajikistan) Shodmon Rizoev	00
(Turkey) Vedat Albayrak	00
(Austria) Wachid Borchashvili	02

Quarter-finals
(Georgia (country)) Tato Grigalashvili	01
(Austria) Wachid Borchashvili	00

=== Pool B ===
First round
(Czech Republic) Adam Kopecký	00
(Germany) Timo Cavelius	10
(Argentina) Tomás Morales	00
(Switzerland) Aurélien Bonferroni	10
(Puerto Rico) Adrián Gandía	00
(Japan) Takanori Nagase	02
(Greece) Athanasios Mylonelis	00
(Kyrgyzstan) Asad Masabirov	01
(South Korea) Lee Joon-hwan	02
(Bahrain) Askerbii Gerbekov	00

Round of 32
(Brazil) Guilherme Schimidt	00
(Germany) Timo Cavelius	01
(Switzerland) Aurélien Bonferroni	00
(Japan) Takanori Nagase	10
(France) Alpha Oumar Djalo	01
(Kyrgyzstan) Asad Masabirov	00
(South Korea) Lee Joon-hwan	02
(Qatar) Mohamed Rebahi	00

Round of 16
(Germany) Timo Cavelius	00
(Japan) Takanori Nagase	10
(France) Alpha Oumar Djalo	00
(South Korea) Lee Joon-hwan	01

Quarter-finals
(Japan) Takanori Nagase	00
(South Korea) Lee Joon-hwan	01

=== Pool C ===
First round
(Italy) Antonio Esposito	10
(Argentina) Agustín Gil	00
(Dominican Republic) Medickson del Orbe	10
(Tajikistan) Somon Makhmadbekov	00
(Uzbekistan) Muso Sobirov	10
(Spain) José María Mendiola	00
(United Kingdom) Lachlan Moorhead	10
(Republic of Ireland) Bearach Gleeson	00

Round of 32
(Belgium) Matthias Casse	10
(Italy) Antonio Esposito	00
(Dominican Republic) Medickson del Orbe	02
(United States) Nicolas Yonezuka	00
(Hungary) Attila Ungvári	10
(Uzbekistan) Muso Sobirov	01
(United Kingdom) Lachlan Moorhead	01
(Greece) Theodoros Demourtsidis	00

Round of 16
(Belgium) Matthias Casse	01
(Dominican Republic) Medickson del Orbe	00
(Hungary) Attila Ungvári	01
(United Kingdom) Lachlan Moorhead	00

Quarter-finals
(Belgium) Matthias Casse	10
(Hungary) Attila Ungvári	00

=== Pool D ===
First round
(Slovakia) Alex Barto	00
(Canada) François Gauthier-Drapeau	01
(Kazakhstan) Abylaikhan Zhubanazar	10
(Portugal) João Fernando	00
(Bulgaria) Georgi Gramatikov	00
(Israel) Sagi Muki	10
(Qatar) Khalil Rebahi	01
(Mongolia) Gereltuyaagiin Bolor-Ochir	10
(Moldova) Victor Sterpu	10
(Germany) Dominic Ressel	00

Round of 32
(Azerbaijan) Saeid Mollaei	00
(Canada) François Gauthier-Drapeau	10
(Kazakhstan) Abylaikhan Zhubanazar	00
(Brazil) Eduardo Yudy Santos	10
(Austria) Shamil Borchashvili	01
(Israel) Sagi Muki	02
(Mongolia) Gereltuyaagiin Bolor-Ochir	10
(Moldova) Victor Sterpu	00

Round of 16
(Canada) François Gauthier-Drapeau	02
(Brazil) Eduardo Yudy Santos	00
(Israel) Sagi Muki	10
(Mongolia) Gereltuyaagiin Bolor-Ochir	00

Quarter-finals
(Canada) François Gauthier-Drapeau	00
(Israel) Sagi Muki	10

== Prize money ==
The sums listed bring the total prizes awarded to €57,000 for the individual event.

Medal	Total	Judoka	Coach
Gold	€26,000	€20,800	€5,200
Silver	€15,000	€12,000	€3,000
Bronze	€8,000	€6,400	€1,600
