= 2017 World Judo Cadets Championships =

Judo competition

Judo 2017 World Judo Cadets Championships
- Venue: Julio Martínez Prádanos National Stadium
- Location: Santiago, Chile
- Dates: 9–13 August 2017
- Competitors: 428 from 64 nations

Champions
- Mixed team: Russia (1st title)

Competition at external databases
- Links: IJF • JudoInside

The 2017 World Judo Cadets Championships is an edition of the World Judo Cadets Championships, organised by the International Judo Federation. It was held in Santiago, Chile from 9 to 13 August 2017. The final day of competition featured the inaugural mixed team world cadets championships, won by team Russia.

== Medal summary ==
=== Medal table ===
* Host nation (Chile)

Rank	Nation	Gold	Silver	Bronze	Total
1	Japan (JPN)	3	2	7	12
2	Germany (GER)	2	1	4	7
3	Russia (RUS)	2	1	3	6
4	South Korea (KOR)	2	0	0	2
5	Brazil (BRA)	1	2	2	5
6	Georgia (GEO)	1	2	1	4
7	Hungary (HUN)	1	0	3	4
8	Turkey (TUR)	1	0	2	3
9	Croatia (CRO)	1	0	0	1
9	Moldova (MDA)	1	0	0	1
9	Romania (ROU)	1	0	0	1
12	Kazakhstan (KAZ)	0	1	1	2
13	Argentina (ARG)	0	1	0	1
13	Bulgaria (BUL)	0	1	0	1
13	France (FRA)	0	1	0	1
13	Montenegro (MNE)	0	1	0	1
13	North Korea (PRK)	0	1	0	1
13	Poland (POL)	0	1	0	1
13	Uzbekistan (UZB)	0	1	0	1
20	Canada (CAN)	0	0	2	2
20	Italy (ITA)	0	0	2	2
22	Belgium (BEL)	0	0	1	1
22	Mongolia (MGL)	0	0	1	1
22	Netherlands (NED)	0	0	1	1
22	Tajikistan (TJK)	0	0	1	1
22	Ukraine (UKR)	0	0	1	1
Totals (26 entries)		16	16	32	64

=== Men's events ===
Event	Gold	Silver	Bronze
−50 kg	Aldi De Oliveira (BRA)	Maksud Ochilov (UZB)	Csanád Feczkó (HUN)
−50 kg	Aldi De Oliveira (BRA)	Maksud Ochilov (UZB)	Daan Moes (NED)
−55 kg	Mihraç Akkuş (TUR)	Luka Kapanadze (GEO)	Abrek Naguchev (RUS)
−55 kg	Mihraç Akkuş (TUR)	Luka Kapanadze (GEO)	Hitoyoshi Sumi (JPN)
−60 kg	Kazbek Naguchev (RUS)	Nurzat Salimbayev (KAZ)	Bayanmönkhiin Narmandakh (MGL)
−60 kg	Kazbek Naguchev (RUS)	Nurzat Salimbayev (KAZ)	Hayato Kondo (JPN)
−66 kg	Ranto Katsura (JPN)	Mark Hristov (BUL)	Dhzamoliddin Abdulloev (TJK)
−66 kg	Ranto Katsura (JPN)	Mark Hristov (BUL)	Keagan Young (CAN)
−73 kg	Lasha Bekauri (GEO)	Daiki Nakahashi (JPN)	Armen Agaian (RUS)
−73 kg	Lasha Bekauri (GEO)	Daiki Nakahashi (JPN)	Muhammet Koç (TUR)
−81 kg	Eugen Matveiciuc (MDA)	Agustín Gil (ARG)	Serikbolsyn Shyntas (KAZ)
−81 kg	Eugen Matveiciuc (MDA)	Agustín Gil (ARG)	Benedek Tóth (HUN)
−90 kg	Eduard Serban (ROU)	Kenshin Mori (JPN)	Said Gadzhiev (RUS)
−90 kg	Eduard Serban (ROU)	Kenshin Mori (JPN)	Benjamin Kendrick (CAN)
+90 kg	Kim Min-jong (KOR)	David Babayan (RUS)	Ömer Aydın (TUR)
+90 kg	Kim Min-jong (KOR)	David Babayan (RUS)	Jonas Schreiber (GER)

=== Women's events ===
Event	Gold	Silver	Bronze
−40 kg	Marina Vorobeva (RUS)	Ivana Nikolić (MNE)	Anastasiia Balaban (UKR)
−40 kg	Marina Vorobeva (RUS)	Ivana Nikolić (MNE)	Jente Verstraeten (BEL)
−44 kg	Haruka Kawabata (JPN)	Jong Hung Kim (PRK)	Amanda Arraes (BRA)
−44 kg	Haruka Kawabata (JPN)	Jong Hung Kim (PRK)	Carlotta Avanzato (ITA)
−48 kg	Brigitta Varga (HUN)	Mascha Ballhaus (GER)	Jana Gussenberg (GER)
−48 kg	Brigitta Varga (HUN)	Mascha Ballhaus (GER)	Aiko Watanabe (JPN)
−52 kg	Seija Ballhaus (GER)	Faïza Mokdar (FRA)	Mina Kobayashi (JPN)
−52 kg	Seija Ballhaus (GER)	Faïza Mokdar (FRA)	Szofi Özbas (HUN)
−57 kg	Kim Ju-hee (KOR)	Natalia Kropska (POL)	Giovanna Fusco (ITA)
−57 kg	Kim Ju-hee (KOR)	Natalia Kropska (POL)	Haruka Nakaya (JPN)
−63 kg	Ayano Yuki (JPN)	Gabriella Moraes (BRA)	Mariam Tchanturia (GEO)
−63 kg	Ayano Yuki (JPN)	Gabriella Moraes (BRA)	Annabelle Winzig (GER)
−70 kg	Marlene Galandi (GER)	Millena Silva (BRA)	Raffaela Igl (GER)
−70 kg	Marlene Galandi (GER)	Millena Silva (BRA)	Rizu Matsumoto (JPN)
+70 kg	Helena Vuković (CRO)	Sophio Somkhishvili (GEO)	Luiza Cruz (BRA)
+70 kg	Helena Vuković (CRO)	Sophio Somkhishvili (GEO)	Akiho Yonekawa (JPN)

Source Results

=== Mixed ===
Event	Gold	Silver	Bronze
Mixed team	Russia	Brazil	Japan
Mixed team	Russia	Brazil	Georgia

Source Results
