= 2025 Judo Grand Slam Ulaanbaatar =

Judo competition

Judo 2025 Judo Grand Slam Ulaanbaatar
- Venue: AIC Steppe Arena
- Location: Ulaanbaatar, Mongolia
- Dates: 25–27 July 2025
- Competitors: 236 from 28 nations
- Total prize money: €154,000

Competition at external databases
- Links: IJF • JudoInside

The 2025 Judo Grand Slam Ulaanbaatar is a judo competition of the Grand Slam series that was held at the AIC Steppe Arena in Ulaanbaatar, Mongolia from 25 to 27 July 2025 as part of the IJF World Tour.

== Medal summary ==
=== Men's events ===
Event	Gold	Silver	Bronze
Extra-lightweight (−60 kg)	Hiroto Shirakane (JPN)	Hayato Kondo (JPN)	Iznaur Saaev (IJF)
Extra-lightweight (−60 kg)	Hiroto Shirakane (JPN)	Hayato Kondo (JPN)	Byambasürengiin Sükhbat (MGL)
Half-lightweight (−66 kg)	Abdurakhim Nutfulloev (UZB)	Denis Vieru (MDA)	Yang Ji-hyuk (KOR)
Half-lightweight (−66 kg)	Abdurakhim Nutfulloev (UZB)	Denis Vieru (MDA)	Battogtokhyn Erkhembayar (MGL)
Lightweight (−73 kg)	Odgereliin Uranbayar (MGL)	Ahmadzod Masudi (TJK)	Yudai Tanaka (JPN)
Lightweight (−73 kg)	Odgereliin Uranbayar (MGL)	Ahmadzod Masudi (TJK)	Lavjargalyn Ankhzayaa (MGL)
Half-middleweight (−81 kg)	Yuhei Oino (JPN)	Gadzhimurad Omarov (UAE)	Adam Tsechoev (IJF)
Half-middleweight (−81 kg)	Yuhei Oino (JPN)	Gadzhimurad Omarov (UAE)	Askerbii Gerbekov (BHR)
Middleweight (−90 kg)	Riku Okada (JPN)	Umar Bozorov (UZB)	Israpil Sagaipov (BHR)
Middleweight (−90 kg)	Riku Okada (JPN)	Umar Bozorov (UZB)	Ikhvan Edilsultanov (IJF)
Half-heavyweight (−100 kg)	Anton Savytskiy (UKR)	Zsombor Vég (HUN)	Nikoloz Sherazadishvili (ESP)
Half-heavyweight (−100 kg)	Anton Savytskiy (UKR)	Zsombor Vég (HUN)	Said Sadrudinov (BHR)
Heavyweight (+100 kg)	Batkhuyagiin Gonchigsüren (MGL)	Artem Zolotukhin (IJF)	Denis Batchaev (IJF)
Heavyweight (+100 kg)	Batkhuyagiin Gonchigsüren (MGL)	Artem Zolotukhin (IJF)	Daigo Kagawa (JPN)

=== Women's events ===
Event	Gold	Silver	Bronze
Extra-lightweight (−48 kg)	Mitsuki Kondo (JPN)	Marina Vorobeva (IJF)	Sabina Giliazova (IJF)
Extra-lightweight (−48 kg)	Mitsuki Kondo (JPN)	Marina Vorobeva (IJF)	Altanshagain Misheel (MGL)
Half-lightweight (−52 kg)	Kokoro Fujishiro (JPN)	Myagmarsürengiin Nandin-Erdene (MGL)	Glafira Borisova (IJF)
Half-lightweight (−52 kg)	Kokoro Fujishiro (JPN)	Myagmarsürengiin Nandin-Erdene (MGL)	Yao Yuhong (CHN)
Lightweight (−57 kg)	Kseniia Galitskaia (IJF)	Ana Viktorija Puljiz (CRO)	Lkhagvasürengiin Sosorbaram (MGL)
Lightweight (−57 kg)	Kseniia Galitskaia (IJF)	Ana Viktorija Puljiz (CRO)	Megumi Fuchida (JPN)
Half-middleweight (−63 kg)	Boldyn Gankhaich (MGL)	Kirari Yamaguchi (JPN)	Gaëtane Deberdt (FRA)
Half-middleweight (−63 kg)	Boldyn Gankhaich (MGL)	Kirari Yamaguchi (JPN)	Nina Simić (CRO)
Middleweight (−70 kg)	Utana Terada (JPN)	Liu Lu (CHN)	Feng Yingying (CHN)
Middleweight (−70 kg)	Utana Terada (JPN)	Liu Lu (CHN)	Darkhanbatbayaryn Yesüi (MGL)
Half-heavyweight (−78 kg)	Patrícia Sampaio (POR)	Mami Umeki (JPN)	Aleksandra Babintseva (IJF)
Half-heavyweight (−78 kg)	Patrícia Sampaio (POR)	Mami Umeki (JPN)	Peng Yuxiao (CHN)
Heavyweight (+78 kg)	Léa Fontaine (FRA)	Ayiman Jinesinuer (CHN)	Helena Vuković (CRO)
Heavyweight (+78 kg)	Léa Fontaine (FRA)	Ayiman Jinesinuer (CHN)	Dambadarjaagiin Nominzul (MGL)

Source results:

=== Medal table ===
* Host nation (Mongolia)

Rank	Nation	Gold	Silver	Bronze	Total
1	Japan (JPN)	6	3	3	12
2	Mongolia (MGL)*	3	1	7	11
3	International Judo Federation (IJF)	1	2	7	10
4	Uzbekistan (UZB)	1	1	0	2
5	France (FRA)	1	0	1	2
6	Portugal (POR)	1	0	0	1
6	Ukraine (UKR)	1	0	0	1
8	China (CHN)	0	2	3	5
9	Croatia (CRO)	0	1	2	3
10	Hungary (HUN)	0	1	0	1
10	Moldova (MDA)	0	1	0	1
10	Tajikistan (TJK)	0	1	0	1
10	United Arab Emirates (UAE)	0	1	0	1
14	Bahrain (BHR)	0	0	3	3
15	South Korea (KOR)	0	0	1	1
15	Spain (ESP)	0	0	1	1
Totals (16 entries)		14	14	28	56

== Prize money ==
The sums written are per medalist, bringing the total prizes awarded to €154,000. (retrieved from:)

Medal	Total	Judoka	Coach
Gold	€5,000	€4,000	€1,000
Silver	€3,000	€2,400	€600
Bronze	€1,500	€1,200	€300
