= Mitsuki Kondo =

Japanese judoka (born 2004)

Personal information
- Born: 28 November 2004 (age 21)
- Occupation: Judoka

Sport
- Country: Japan
- Sport: Judo
- Weight class: ‍–‍48 kg
Medal record
Women's judo
Representing Japan
Asian Games
| Gold medal – first place | 2026 Aichi‑Nagoya | ‍–‍48 kg |
IJF Grand Slam
| Gold medal – first place | 2025 Paris | ‍–‍48 kg |
| Gold medal – first place | 2025 Ulaanbaatar | ‍–‍48 kg |
| Silver medal – second place | 2024 Tokyo | ‍–‍48 kg |
IJF Grand Prix
| Gold medal – first place | 2024 Linz | ‍–‍48 kg |
| Gold medal – first place | 2026 Linz | ‍–‍48 kg |

Profile at external databases
- IJF: 81416
- JudoInside.com: 165840
- Updated on 1 October 2026

Mitsuki Kondo (近藤美月, Kondo Mitsuki; born 28 November 2004) is a Japanese judoka.

== Career ==
In February 2025, Kondo competed at the 2025 Judo Grand Slam Paris and won her first career grand slam gold medal in the –48 kg category. In July 2025, she competed at the 2025 Judo Grand Slam Ulaanbaatar and again won a gold medal in the –48 kg category.

In March 2026, she competed at the 2026 Judo Grand Prix Linz and won a gold medal in the –48 kg category. In September 2026, she competed at the 2026 Asian Games and won a gold medal in the –48 kg category.

== Personal life ==
Kondo's older brother, Hayato Kondo, is also a judoka.
