= Raz Hershko =

Israeli judoka (born 1998)

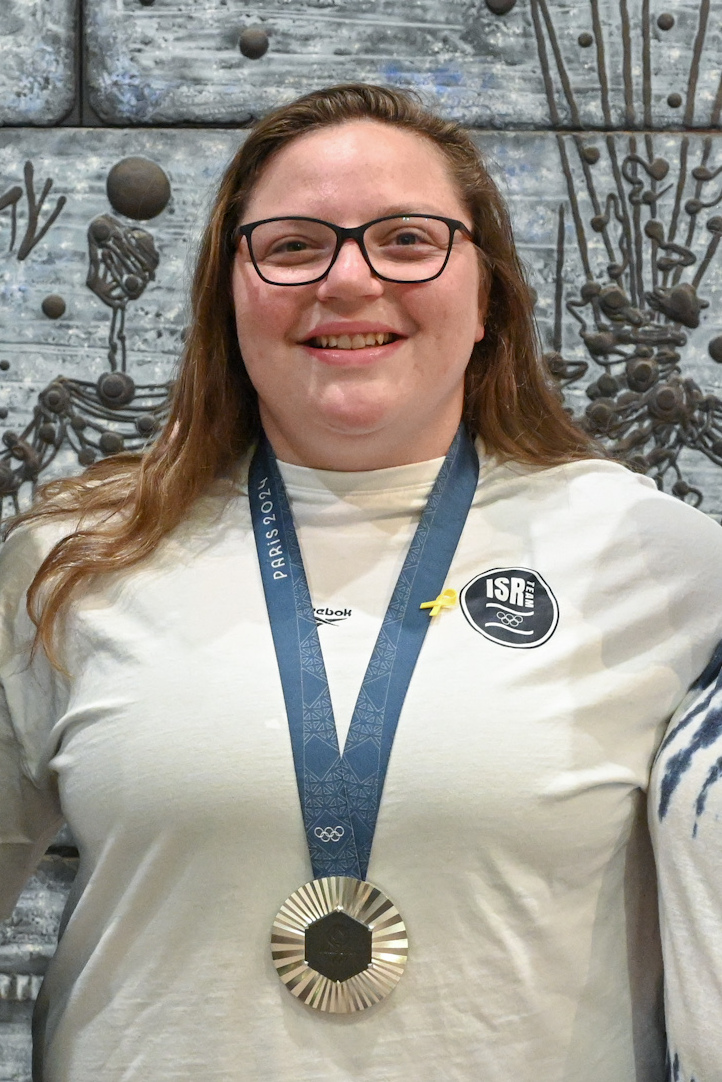
- Hershko at the 2024 Summer Olympics

Personal information
- Native name: רז הרשקו
- Nickname: Hershkules
- Born: 19 June 1998 (age 28) Netanya, Israel
- Occupation: Judoka

Sport
- Country: Israel
- Sport: Judo
- Weight class: +78 kg
- Rank: 5th dan black belt
- Coached by: Shany Hershko, Miki Tanaka, and Ido Bar

Achievements and titles
- Olympic Games: (silver) (2024)
- World Champ.: (bronze) (2023, 2026)
- European Champ.: (gold) (2024, 2026)
- Highest world ranking: 1^{st}
Medal record
Women's judo
Representing Israel
Olympic Games
Silver medal – second place	2024 Paris	+78 kg
Bronze medal – third place	2020 Tokyo	Mixed team
World Championships
Bronze medal – third place	2022 Tashkent	Mixed team
Bronze medal – third place	2023 Doha	+78 kg
Bronze medal – third place	2026 Baku	+78 kg
European Championships
Gold medal – first place	2024 Zagreb	+78 kg
Gold medal – first place	2026 Tbilisi	+78 kg
Silver medal – second place	2022 Sofia	+78 kg
Silver medal – second place	2023 Montpellier	+78 kg
Silver medal – second place	2025 Podgorica	+78 kg
World Masters
Bronze medal – third place	2022 Jerusalem	+78 kg
IJF Grand Slam
Gold medal – first place	2021 Antalya	+78 kg
Gold medal – first place	2021 Paris	+78 kg
Gold medal – first place	2022 Ulaanbaatar	+78 kg
Gold medal – first place	2023 Tel Aviv	+78 kg
Gold medal – first place	2023 Tbilisi	+78 kg
Gold medal – first place	2026 Tbilisi	+78 kg
Gold medal – first place	2026 Budapest	+78 kg
Silver medal – second place	2022 Antalya	+78 kg
Silver medal – second place	2023 Ulaanbaatar	+78 kg
Silver medal – second place	2026 Abu Dhabi	+78 kg
Bronze medal – third place	2021 Baku	+78 kg
Bronze medal – third place	2021 Abu Dhabi	+78 kg
Bronze medal – third place	2022 Tel Aviv	+78 kg
Bronze medal – third place	2022 Budapest	+78 kg
Bronze medal – third place	2023 Baku	+78 kg
Bronze medal – third place	2023 Tokyo	+78 kg
Bronze medal – third place	2024 Paris	+78 kg
Bronze medal – third place	2025 Paris	+78 kg
IJF Grand Prix
Gold medal – first place	2022 Zagreb	+78 kg
Gold medal – first place	2025 Lima	+78 kg
Gold medal – first place	2025 Guadalajara	+78 kg
Gold medal – first place	2026 Linz	+78 kg
Silver medal – second place	2019 Montreal	+78 kg
Bronze medal – third place	2026 Lima	+78 kg
European U23 Championships
Silver medal – second place	2017 Podgorica	+78 kg
Bronze medal – third place	2018 Győr	+78 kg
European Cadet Championships
Gold medal – first place	2015 Sofia	+70 kg
European Youth Olympic Festival
Silver medal – second place	2015 Tbilisi	+70 kg

Profile at external databases
- IJF: 13713
- JudoInside.com: 73001
- Updated on 1 November 2026

Raz Hershko (Hebrew: רז הרשקו; born 19 June 1998; nicknamed Hershkules) is an Israeli Olympic silver medalist and European champion judoka. She was the 2015 European Cadet Champion, the 2017 European U23 Championships silver medalist, and won a bronze medal in the 2023 World Championships. She competed for Israel at the 2020 Summer Olympics, winning a bronze medal in the mixed team event. She is the 2024 European Champion. Representing Israel at the 2024 Paris Olympics, Hershko won the silver medal in judo in the women's +78 kg, and also competed in the mixed team event, in which Team Israel came in ninth. She won the bronze medal in the over 78kg women's category in the World Judo Championships in Baku, Azerbaijan in October, 2026.

== Early life ==
Hershko was born in Netanya, Israel, and is Jewish. Her uncle is Israeli-born former judoka and current Head Coach of the Israel women's national judo team Shany Hershko, and when she was four years old she joined the judo club he had founded. In 2016, she began her Israel Defense Forces service as an exceptional athlete.

Hershko is openly lesbian. She said: "I came out to my parents, and now I feel that everyone accepts me as I am."

== Career ==
Hershko competes in the 78 kg-and-over weight category. She is coached by Shany Hershko, Miki Tanaka, and Ido Bar. Hershko trains at the Wingate Institute in Netanya, Israel.

=== 2014–16; European U18 Champion ===
Hershko won the silver medal in the 2014 European Cup U21 Coimbra, and bronze medals in the 2014 European Cup U21 Thessaloniki and the 2014 European Cup U21 La Coruña. She won the gold medal in the 2014 Israeli U18 Championships in Ra'anana.

Hershko won the 2015 European Cadet Championships in Sofia. She also won silver medals at the 2015 European Youth Summer Olympic Festival, the 2015 European Cup U21 La Coruña, and the 2015 European Cup Cadets Fuengirola. She won the silver medal in the 2015 Israeli Championships in Ra'anana.

Hershko won the gold medals at the 2016 European Cup U21 Athens and the 2016 European Cup U21 Ploiești. Hershko also won a bronze medal at the 2016 European Cup U21 La Coruña. She won the gold medal at the 2016 Israeli U21 Championships in Ra'anana.

=== 2017–20; European U23 championships silver medal ===
Hershko won a silver medal at the 2017 European U23 Championships in Podgorica, Montenegro, and a bronze at the 2018 European U23 Championships in Gyor, Hungary. She won the gold medal in the 2018 European Cup Málaga, Spain. She won the silver medal in the 2017 Israeli Championships in Ra'anana.

Hershko won the gold medal in the 2018 Israeli Championships in Tel Aviv.

At the 2019 Montreal Grand Prix in Canada, Hershko won a silver medal, and at the 2019 European Open Cluj-Napoca in Romania she won a bronze medal. She won the gold medal in the 2019 Israeli Championships in Tel Aviv. In November 2020, she had elbow surgery.

=== 2020 Tokyo Olympics (in 2021); bronze medal ===
Hershko represented Israel at the 2020 Summer Olympics in 2021, competing at the women's +78 kg weight category. Hershko won her first match with an ippon against the Saudi Tahani Alqahtani in 42 seconds, advancing to the round of 16. There, she met the 2019 world champion – Japan's Akira Sone. Hershko lost to Sone, ending her part in the individual competition. She won an Olympic bronze medal in the mixed team.

=== 2021–present; European Champion, and world championship bronze medal ===
Hershko won the gold medals at the 2021 Antalya Grand Slam in Turkey and the 2021 Paris Grand Slam in France. She also won bronze medals at the 2021 Baku Grand Slam and the 2021 Abu Dhabi Grand Slam.

Hershko won the silver medal at the 2022 European Championships in Sofia, Bulgaria. She also won gold medals at the 2022 Ulaanbaatar Grand Slam in Mongolia and the 2022 Zagreb Grand Prix in Croatia. She won a silver medal at the 2022 Antalya Grand Slam in Turkey, and bronze medals at the 2022 World Masters in Jerusalem, Israel, the 2022 Tel Aviv Grand Slam in Israel, and the 2022 Budapest Grand Slam in Hungary.

Hershko won a bronze medal at the 2023 World Championships in Doha, Qatar. She won the silver medal at the 2023 European Championships in Montpellier, France. She won gold medals at the 2023 Tel Aviv Grand Slam in Israel and the 2023 Tbilisi Grand Slam in Georgia, a silver medal at the 2023 Ulaanbaatar Grand Slam in Mongolia, and bronze medals at the 2023 Baku Grand Slam and the 2023 Tokyo Grand Slam. She won the gold medal in the 2023 Israeli Championships.

Hershko won the gold medal at the 2024 European Championships in Zagreb, Croatia. She dedicated her medal to Israeli Yonatan Goutin, who was killed by Hamas terrorists in the October 7 attack on Kibbutz Be'eri in the Be'eri massacre. She won a bronze medal at the 2024 Paris Grand Slam in France.

=== 2024 Paris Olympics; Silver medal ===
Representing Israel at the 2024 Summer Olympics, Hershko won the silver medal in judo in the women's +78 kg. She defeated Marit Kamps of the Netherlands, Milica Žabić of Serbia, former two-time European champion Kayra Özdemir of Turkey (in 14 seconds), and then lost in the final to five-time Pan American champion Beatriz Souza of Brazil. She also competed in the mixed team event, in which Team Israel came in ninth. She said:

Since October 7 [the date of the 2023 Hamas-led attack on Israel], I feel the extra need to not only succeed for myself but I want to succeed for the entire country.,,, The medal isn’t just for me but for all of us. I wanted to represent our flag the best way that I could, and show what type of country we are during these very tough times.

== Titles ==
Year	Tournament	Place	Ref.
2019	Grand Prix Montreal	2nd place, silver medalist(s)	
2021	Grand Slam Antalya	1st place, gold medalist(s)	
2021	Grand Slam Paris	1st place, gold medalist(s)	
2021	Grand Slam Baku	3rd place, bronze medalist(s)	
2021	Grand Slam Abu Dhabi	3rd place, bronze medalist(s)	
2022	Grand Slam Tel Aviv	3rd place, bronze medalist(s)	
2022	Grand Slam Antalya	2nd place, silver medalist(s)	
2022	European Championships	2nd place, silver medalist(s)	
2022	Grand Slam Ulaanbaatar	1st place, gold medalist(s)	
2022	Grand Slam Budapest	3rd place, bronze medalist(s)	
2022	Grand Prix Zagreb	1st place, gold medalist(s)	
2022	World Masters	3rd place, bronze medalist(s)	
2023	Grand Slam Tel Aviv	1st place, gold medalist(s)	
2023	Grand Slam Tbilisi	1st place, gold medalist(s)	
2023	World Championships	3rd place, bronze medalist(s)	
2023	Grand Slam Ulaanbaatar	2nd place, silver medalist(s)	
2023	European Championships	2nd place, silver medalist(s)	
2023	Grand Slam Tokyo	3rd place, bronze medalist(s)	
2024	Grand Slam Paris	3rd place, bronze medalist(s)	
2024	European Championships	1st place, gold medalist(s)	
2024	Olympic Games	2nd place, silver medalist(s)	
2025	Grand Slam Paris	3rd place, bronze medalist(s)	
2025	European Championships	2nd place, silver medalist(s)	
2025	Grand Prix Lima	1st place, gold medalist(s)	
2025	Grand Prix Guadalajara	1st place, gold medalist(s)	
2026	Grand Prix Linz	1st place, gold medalist(s)	
2026	Grand Slam Tbilisi	1st place, gold medalist(s)	
2026	European Championships	1st place, gold medalist(s)	

== See also ==
- List of select Jewish judokas
- List of Jewish Olympic medalists
- List of World Judo Championships medalists
- List of Olympic medalists in judo
- List of 2020 Summer Olympics medal winners
- List of LGBTI Olympians and Paralympians
