= 2026 European Judo Championships – Women's +78 kg =

Judo competition

Judo Women's +78 kg at the 2026 European Judo Championships
- Venue: Olympic Palace
- Location: Tbilisi, Georgia
- Date: 19 April 2026
- Competitors: 18 from 14 nations

Medalists
gold medal	Raz Hershko (2nd title)	Israel
silver medal	Léa Fontaine	France
bronze medal	Asya Tavano	Italy
bronze medal	Romane Dicko	France

Competition at external databases
- Links: IJF • JudoInside

The women's +78 kg event at the 2026 European Judo Championships was held at the Olympic Palace in Tbilisi, Georgia on 19 April 2026.

== Results ==
=== Finals ===
Semi-finals
(Israel) Raz Hershko	020
(Croatia) Helena Vuković	000
(Estonia) Emma-Melis Aktas	000 (yellow card)
(France) Léa Fontaine	001 (yellow card)

Final
(Israel) Raz Hershko	110
(France) Léa Fontaine	000

=== Repechage ===
Repechage
(Italy) Erica Simonetti	000
(Italy) Asya Tavano	100
(France) Romane Dicko	010 (yellow card)
(Israel) Yuli Alma Mishiner	000

Bronze medal
(Italy) Asya Tavano	100
(Estonia) Emma-Melis Aktas	000
(France) Romane Dicko	101
(Croatia) Helena Vuković	000

=== Pool A ===
First round
(Poland) Kinga Wolszczak	000
(Bulgaria) Irina Zhelezarska	010

Round of 16
(Israel) Raz Hershko	100
(Bulgaria) Irina Zhelezarska	000
(Italy) Erica Simonetti	100
(Moldova) Oxana Diacenco	000

Quarter-finals
(Israel) Raz Hershko	001
(Italy) Erica Simonetti	000 (yellow card)

=== Pool B ===
First round

Round of 16
(Croatia) Helena Vuković	100 (yellow card)
(Georgia (country)) Sophio Somkhishvili	000
(Italy) Asya Tavano	100
(Ukraine) Ruslana Bulavina	000 (yellow card)

Quarter-finals
(Croatia) Helena Vuković	001
(Italy) Asya Tavano	000 (yellow card)

=== Pool C ===
First round

Round of 16
(France) Romane Dicko	100
(Germany) Lilli Louise Wojta	000 (yellow card)
(Estonia) Emma-Melis Aktas	001 (yellow card)
(Portugal) Rochele Nunes	000 (yellow card)

Quarter-finals
(France) Romane Dicko	000 (yellow card)
(Estonia) Emma-Melis Aktas	001

=== Pool D ===
First round
(Azerbaijan) Madina Kaisinova	000
(Russia) Elis Startseva	001

Round of 16
(France) Léa Fontaine	w/o
~~(Croatia) Tina Radić~~
(Israel) Yuli Alma Mishiner	001
(Russia) Elis Startseva	000 (yellow card)

Quarter-finals
(France) Léa Fontaine	101
(Israel) Yuli Alma Mishiner	000
