= 2026 Judo Grand Slam Dushanbe =

Judo competition

Judo 2026 Judo Grand Slam Dushanbe
- Venue: Kasri Tennis
- Location: Dushanbe, Tajikistan
- Dates: 1–3 May 2026
- Competitors: 240 from 34 nations
- Total prize money: €154,000

Competition at external databases
- Links: IJF • JudoInside

The 2026 Judo Grand Slam Dushanbe was held at the Kasri Tennis arena in Dushanbe, Tajikistan, from 1 to 3 May 2026 as part of the IJF World Tour.

== Medal summary ==
=== Men's events ===
Event	Gold	Silver	Bronze
Extra-lightweight (−60 kg)	Ayub Bliev (RUS)	Artem Lesiuk (UKR)	Nuradil Alzhan (KAZ)
Extra-lightweight (−60 kg)	Ayub Bliev (RUS)	Artem Lesiuk (UKR)	Loiq Kudbudinov (TJK)
Half-lightweight (−66 kg)	Nurali Emomali (TJK)	Azizbek Ortikov (UZB)	Yago Abuladze (RUS)
Half-lightweight (−66 kg)	Nurali Emomali (TJK)	Azizbek Ortikov (UZB)	German Kobets (RUS)
Lightweight (−73 kg)	Muhiddin Asadulloev (TJK)	Karen Galstian (RUS)	Danil Lavrentev (RUS)
Lightweight (−73 kg)	Muhiddin Asadulloev (TJK)	Karen Galstian (RUS)	Rashid Mammadaliyev (AZE)
Half-middleweight (−81 kg)	Somon Makhmadbekov (TJK)	Bernd Fasching (AUT)	Victor Sterpu (MDA)
Half-middleweight (−81 kg)	Somon Makhmadbekov (TJK)	Bernd Fasching (AUT)	Alpha Oumar Djalo (FRA)
Middleweight (−90 kg)	Mansur Lorsanov (RUS)	Theodoros Tselidis (GRE)	Adam Kopecký (CZE)
Middleweight (−90 kg)	Mansur Lorsanov (RUS)	Theodoros Tselidis (GRE)	Mihail Latișev (MDA)
Half-heavyweight (−100 kg)	Huang Fuchun (CHN)	Adam Sangariev (RUS)	Oleksii Yershov (UKR)
Half-heavyweight (−100 kg)	Huang Fuchun (CHN)	Adam Sangariev (RUS)	Vadim Ghimbovschi (MDA)
Heavyweight (+100 kg)	Jakub Sordyl (POL)	Bislan Katamardov (RUS)	Dzhamal Gamzatkhanov (AZE)
Heavyweight (+100 kg)	Jakub Sordyl (POL)	Bislan Katamardov (RUS)	Ushangi Kokauri (AZE)

=== Women's events ===
Event	Gold	Silver	Bronze
Extra-lightweight (−48 kg)	Jamsrangiin Anudari (MGL)	Amber Gersjes (NED)	Zhuang Wenna (CHN)
Extra-lightweight (−48 kg)	Jamsrangiin Anudari (MGL)	Amber Gersjes (NED)	Hui Xinran (CHN)
Half-lightweight (−52 kg)	Odette Giuffrida (ITA)	Aleksandra Kaleta (POL)	Kenya Perna (ITA)
Half-lightweight (−52 kg)	Odette Giuffrida (ITA)	Aleksandra Kaleta (POL)	Myagmarsürengiin Nandin-Erdene (MGL)
Lightweight (−57 kg)	Olga Mukhina (RUS)	Terbishiin Ariunzayaa (MGL)	Tao Yuying (CHN)
Lightweight (−57 kg)	Olga Mukhina (RUS)	Terbishiin Ariunzayaa (MGL)	Natalia Elkina (RUS)
Half-middleweight (−63 kg)	Boldyn Gankhaich (MGL)	Lkhagvatogoogiin Enkhriilen (MGL)	Lubjana Piovesana (AUT)
Half-middleweight (−63 kg)	Boldyn Gankhaich (MGL)	Lkhagvatogoogiin Enkhriilen (MGL)	Louna-Lumia Seikkula (FIN)
Middleweight (−70 kg)	Aleksandra Kowalewska (POL)	Michaela Polleres (AUT)	Clémence Eme (FRA)
Middleweight (−70 kg)	Aleksandra Kowalewska (POL)	Michaela Polleres (AUT)	Irene Pedrotti (ITA)
Half-heavyweight (−78 kg)	Yelyzaveta Lytvynenko (UAE)	Yael van Heemst (NED)	Marit Kamps (NED)
Half-heavyweight (−78 kg)	Yelyzaveta Lytvynenko (UAE)	Yael van Heemst (NED)	Alexandra Riabchenko (RUS)
Heavyweight (+78 kg)	Asya Tavano (ITA)	Ayiman Jinesinuer (CHN)	Niu Xinran (CHN)
Heavyweight (+78 kg)	Asya Tavano (ITA)	Ayiman Jinesinuer (CHN)	Mariia Ivanova (RUS)

=== Medal table ===
* Host nation (Tajikistan)

Rank	Nation	Gold	Silver	Bronze	Total
1	Russia (RUS)	3	3	6	12
2	Tajikistan (TJK)*	3	0	1	4
3	Mongolia (MGL)	2	2	1	5
4	Poland (POL)	2	1	0	3
5	Italy (ITA)	2	0	2	4
6	China (CHN)	1	1	4	6
7	United Arab Emirates (UAE)	1	0	0	1
8	Austria (AUT)	0	2	1	3
8	Netherlands (NED)	0	2	1	3
10	Ukraine (UKR)	0	1	1	2
11	Greece (GRE)	0	1	0	1
11	Uzbekistan (UZB)	0	1	0	1
13	Azerbaijan (AZE)	0	0	3	3
13	Moldova (MDA)	0	0	3	3
15	France (FRA)	0	0	2	2
16	Czech Republic (CZE)	0	0	1	1
16	Finland (FIN)	0	0	1	1
16	Kazakhstan (KAZ)	0	0	1	1
Totals (18 entries)		14	14	28	56

== Prize money ==
The sums written are per medalist, bringing the total prizes awarded to €154,000. (retrieved from:)

Medal	Total	Judoka	Coach
Gold	€5,000	€4,000	€1,000
Silver	€3,000	€2,400	€600
Bronze	€1,500	€1,200	€300
