= Hayato Kondo =

Japanese judoka (born 2001)

Personal information
- Born: 15 May 2001 (age 25)
- Occupation: Judoka

Sport
- Country: Japan
- Sport: Judo
- Weight class: ‍–‍60 kg

Achievements and titles
- Asian Champ.: 7th (2023)
Medal record
Men's judo
Representing Japan
Asian Games
Gold medal – first place	2026 Aichi‑Nagoya	‍–‍60 kg
IJF Grand Slam
Gold medal – first place	2025 Tokyo	‍–‍60 kg
Silver medal – second place	2022 Tokyo	‍–‍60 kg
Silver medal – second place	2025 Ulaanbaatar	‍–‍60 kg
Bronze medal – third place	2021 Baku	‍–‍60 kg
Bronze medal – third place	2024 Dushanbe	‍–‍60 kg
IJF Grand Prix
Gold medal – first place	2025 Qingdao	‍–‍60 kg
Gold medal – first place	2026 Qingdao	‍–‍60 kg
Asian Junior Championships
Gold medal – first place	2019 Taipei	‍–‍60 kg
World Cadets Championships
Bronze medal – third place	2017 Santiago	‍–‍60 kg

Profile at external databases
- IJF: 39140
- JudoInside.com: 114906
- Updated on 1 October 2026

Hayato Kondo (近藤隼斗, Kondo Hayato; born 15 May 2001) is a Japanese judoka.

== Career ==
In December 2025, Kondo competed at the 2025 Judo Grand Slam Tokyo and won his first career Judo Grand Slam gold medal in the –‍60 kg category.

In June 2026, he competed at the 2026 Judo Grand Prix Qingdao and won a gold medal in the –‍60 kg category. In September 2026, he competed at the 2026 Asian Games and won a gold medal in the –‍60 kg category.

== Personal life ==
Kondo's younger sister, Mitsuki Kondo, is also a judoka.
