= Judo at the 2022 Commonwealth Games – Men's 81 kg =

Judo competition

Judo – Men's 81 kg at the 2022 Commonwealth Games
- Venue: Coventry Arena
- Dates: 2 August 2022
- Competitors: 16 from 14 nations

Medalists
gold medal	Lachlan Moorhead	England
silver medal	François Gauthier-Drapeau	Canada
bronze medal	Mohab Elnahas	Canada
bronze medal	Uros Nikolic	Australia

The Men's 81 kg judo competitions at the 2022 Commonwealth Games in Birmingham, England took place on August 2 at the Coventry Arena. A total of 16 competitors from 16 nations took part.

== Results ==
The draw is as follows:

Round of 16
François Gauthier-Drapeau (CAN)	10
Rashid Alhassan (GHA)	00
Asa Weithers (BAR)	10
Xavier Jones (TTO)	00 (yellow card)
Eoin Fleming (NIR)	01
Odysseas Georgakis (CYP)	00
~~Abdourahman Ceesay (GAM)~~	DNS
Kip Kosam (NRU)	w/o
Lachlan Moorhead (ENG)	10
Fatai Muritala (NGR)	00 (yellow card)
Uros Nikolic (AUS)	10
Hugo Cumbo (VAN)	00 (yellow card)
Mohab Elnahas (CAN)	10
Kendrick Taleka (NRU)	00
Elliott Connolly (NZL)	10
Rajitha Pushpakumara (SRI)	00

Quarter-finals
François Gauthier-Drapeau (CAN)	10
Asa Weithers (BAR)	00
Eoin Fleming (NIR)	10
Kip Kosam (NRU)	00
Lachlan Moorhead (ENG)	10
Uros Nikolic (AUS)	00 (yellow card)
Mohab Elnahas (CAN)	10
Elliott Connolly (NZL)	00

Semi-finals
François Gauthier-Drapeau (CAN)	10 (yellow card)
Eoin Fleming (NIR)	00 (yellow card)
Lachlan Moorhead (ENG)	11 (yellow card)
Mohab Elnahas (CAN)	01 (yellow card)

Final
François Gauthier-Drapeau (CAN)	00
Lachlan Moorhead (ENG)	10 (yellow card)

=== Repechages ===
Repechage
Asa Weithers (BAR)	10
Kip Kosam (NRU)	00
Uros Nikolic (AUS)	10
Elliott Connolly (NZL)	00

Bronze medal
Asa Weithers (BAR)	00 (yellow card)
Mohab Elnahas (CAN)	10
Uros Nikolic (AUS)	10 (yellow card)
Eoin Fleming (NIR)	01
