= 2023 European Judo Championships – Men's 81 kg =

Judo competition

Judo Men's 81 kg at the 2023 European Judo Championships
- Venue: Sud de France Arena
- Location: Montpellier, France
- Date: 4 November 2023
- Competitors: 37 from 28 nations

Medalists
gold medal	Vedat Albayrak (2nd title)	Turkey
silver medal	Tato Grigalashvili	Georgia
bronze medal	Alpha Oumar Djalo	France
bronze medal	Dominic Ressel	Germany

Competition at external databases
- Links: IJF • JudoInside

The Men's 81 kg event at the 2023 European Judo Championships was held at the Sud de France Arena in Montpellier, France on 4 November 2023.

== Results ==
=== Finals ===
Semi-finals
(Austria) Wachid Borchashvili	00 (yellow card)
(Turkey) Vedat Albayrak	01
(Georgia (country)) Tato Grigalashvili	10
(France) Alpha Oumar Djalo	00 (yellow card)

Final
(Turkey) Vedat Albayrak	01
(Georgia (country)) Tato Grigalashvili	00

=== Repechage ===
Repechage
(Belgium) Matthias Casse	10 (yellow card)
(Ukraine) Mykhailo Svidrak	00
(Germany) Dominic Ressel	01
(Hungary) Attila Ungvári	00 (yellow card)

Bronze medal
(Belgium) Matthias Casse	00
(France) Alpha Oumar Djalo	10
(Germany) Dominic Ressel	10
(Austria) Wachid Borchashvili	00

=== Pool A ===
First round
(Spain) Alfonso Urquiza	01 (yellow card)
(Switzerland) Aurélien Bonferroni	00 (yellow card)

Round of 32
(Belgium) Matthias Casse	10
(North Macedonia) Edi Šerifovski	00
Timur Arbuzov	11
(Moldova) Mihail Latișev	00
(Netherlands) Frank de Wit	00 (yellow card)
(Austria) Wachid Borchashvili	10
(Spain) Alfonso Urquiza	00
(Italy) Antonio Esposito	01 (yellow card)

Round of 16
(Belgium) Matthias Casse	01 (yellow card)
Timur Arbuzov	00
(Austria) Wachid Borchashvili	10 (yellow card)
(Italy) Antonio Esposito	00

Quarter-finals
(Belgium) Matthias Casse	00
(Austria) Wachid Borchashvili	01

=== Pool B ===
First round
(Slovenia) Juš Mecilošek	00
(Ukraine) Mykhailo Svidrak	02

Round of 32
(Israel) Sagi Muki	00
(Portugal) Anri Egutidze	10
(Ukraine) Mykhailo Svidrak	01 (yellow card)
(Germany) Timo Cavelius	00
(Turkey) Vedat Albayrak	10
(Czech Republic) Jan Svoboda	00
(Greece) Athanasios Mylonelis	01
(Poland) Paweł Drzymał	11

Round of 16
(Portugal) Anri Egutidze	00 (yellow card)
(Ukraine) Mykhailo Svidrak	11 (yellow card)
(Turkey) Vedat Albayrak	10
(Poland) Paweł Drzymał	00 (yellow card)

Quarter-finals
(Ukraine) Mykhailo Svidrak	00
(Turkey) Vedat Albayrak	01 (yellow card)

=== Pool C ===
First round
(Spain) José María Mendiola	00
(Belgium) Jarne Duyck	01
(Azerbaijan) Zelim Tckaev	02
(Finland) Oskari Mäkinen	00

Round of 32
(Georgia (country)) Tato Grigalashvili	10 (yellow card)
Sibghatullah Arab	00
(Belgium) Jarne Duyck	01
(Republic of Ireland) Bearach Gleeson	10 (yellow card)
(Austria) Shamil Borchashvili	00
(Azerbaijan) Zelim Tckaev	01 (yellow card)
(Czech Republic) Adam Kopecký	00 (yellow card)
(Germany) Dominic Ressel	01 (yellow card)

Round of 16
(Georgia (country)) Tato Grigalashvili	10
(Republic of Ireland) Bearach Gleeson	00
(Azerbaijan) Zelim Tckaev	00 (yellow card)
(Germany) Dominic Ressel	01

Quarter-finals
(Georgia (country)) Tato Grigalashvili	01 (yellow card)
(Germany) Dominic Ressel	00 (yellow card)

=== Pool D ===
First round
(United Kingdom) Lachlan Moorhead	01
(Greece) Theodoros Demourtsidis	00 (yellow card)

Round of 32
(Hungary) Attila Ungvári	10
(Moldova) Catalin Marian	00
(United Kingdom) Lachlan Moorhead	10
(Iceland) Hrafn Arnarsson	00
(France) Alpha Oumar Djalo	01
(Switzerland) Lukas Wittwer	00
(Bulgaria) Georgi Gramatikov	10
(Portugal) João Fernando	00

Round of 16
(Hungary) Attila Ungvári	02
(United Kingdom) Lachlan Moorhead	00 (yellow card)
(France) Alpha Oumar Djalo	10
(Bulgaria) Georgi Gramatikov	00

Quarter-finals
(Hungary) Attila Ungvári	00
(France) Alpha Oumar Djalo	10
