= Judo at the 2026 Asian Games – Men's 60 kg =

Judo competition

Judo Men's 60 kg at the 2026 Asian Games
- Venue: Aichi International Arena
- Location: Nagoya, Japan
- Date: 2026

Medalists
| gold medal | Hayato Kondo | Japan |
| silver medal | Yeldos Smetov | Kazakhstan |
| bronze medal | Ma Yulin | China |
| bronze medal | Samariddin Kuchkarov | Uzbekistan |

The men's 60 kilograms (Extra lightweight) competition in Judo at the 2026 Asian Games in Nagoya was held on 30 September 2026 at the Aichi International Arena.

== Schedule ==
All times are Japan Standard Time (UTC+09:00)

| Date | Time | Event |
|---|---|---|
| Wednesday, 30 September 2026 | 11:00 | Elimination round of 32 |
| Wednesday, 30 September 2026 | 11:00 | Elimination round of 16 |
| Wednesday, 30 September 2026 | 11:00 | Quarterfinals |
| Wednesday, 30 September 2026 | 11:00 | Repechage |
| Wednesday, 30 September 2026 | 11:00 | Semifinals |
| Wednesday, 30 September 2026 | 17:00 | Finals |

== Results ==
=== Main bracket ===
==== Final ====
| Final |
| Hayato Kondo (JPN) | 002 |
| Yeldos Smetov (KAZ) | 000 (yellow card) |

==== Top half ====
Round of 32
Tugol Kanatbek (KGZ) | 100
Wimukthi Wickrama Arachchige (SRI) | 000
~~Konstantin Simeonidis (UAE)~~ | DNS
An Sin-hyok (PRK) | w/o

Round of 16
Hayato Kondo (JPN) | 101
Daryl John Mercado (PHI) | 000
Ma Yulin (CHN) | 102 (yellow card)
Tugol Kanatbek (KGZ) | 000
Samariddin Kuchkarov (UZB) | 100
Vikas B.K. (NEP) | 000
Ruslan Poltoratskii (BRN) | 100 (yellow card)
An Sin-hyok (PRK) | 000

Quarter-finals
Hayato Kondo (JPN) | 101
Ma Yulin (CHN) | 000
Samariddin Kuchkarov (UZB) | 001 (yellow card)
Ruslan Poltoratskii (BRN) | 000 (yellow card)

Semi-finals
Hayato Kondo (JPN) | 010
Samariddin Kuchkarov (UZB) | 000 (yellow card)

==== Bottom half ====
Round of 32
Volodymyr Guchkov (CAM) | w/o
~~Omran Ajena (SYR)~~ | DQB
Soukphaxay Sithisane (LAO) | 000
Muhammad Rizqi Maulana (INA) | 100

Round of 16
Yang Yung-wei (TPE) | 101
Abdulrahman Al-Saiari (KSA) | 000
Loiq Kudbudinov (TJK) | 010 (yellow card)
Volodymyr Guchkov (CAM) | 001
Lee Ha-rim (KOR) | 000
Yeldos Smetov (KAZ) | 100
Enkhtaivany Ariunbold (MGL) | 001 (yellow card)
Muhammad Rizqi Maulana (INA) | 000 (yellow card)

Quarter-finals
Yang Yung-wei (TPE) | 100 (yellow card)
Loiq Kudbudinov (TJK) | 000
Yeldos Smetov (KAZ) | 100
Enkhtaivany Ariunbold (MGL) | 000

Semi-finals
Yang Yung-wei (TPE) | 000 (yellow card)
Yeldos Smetov (KAZ) | 010 (yellow card)

=== Repechage ===
Repechage
Ma Yulin (CHN) | 100
Ruslan Poltoratskii (BRN) | 000
Loiq Kudbudinov (TJK) | 010 (yellow card)
Enkhtaivany Ariunbold (MGL) | 000 (yellow card)

Bronze medal
Ma Yulin (CHN) | 010 (yellow card)
Yang Yung-wei (TPE) | 000
Loiq Kudbudinov (TJK) | 000
Samariddin Kuchkarov (UZB) | 011
