= Alpha Oumar Djalo =

French judoka (born 1996)

Alpha Djalo
Personal information
- Full name: Alpha Oumar Djalo
- Nationality: French
- Born: 5 September 1996 (age 29) Paris, France
- Occupation: Judoka

Sport
- Country: France
- Sport: Judo
- Weight class: –81 kg
- Club: Racing Club de France / Issy

Achievements and titles
- Olympic Games: R16 (2024)
- World Champ.: R16 (2023)
- European Champ.: (bronze) (2023)
Medal record
Men's judo
Representing France
Olympic Games
Gold medal – first place	2024 Paris	Mixed team
World Championships
Silver medal – second place	2019 Tokyo	Mixed team
European Championships
Bronze medal – third place	2023 Montpellier	‍–‍81 kg
World Masters
Bronze medal – third place	2022 Jerusalem	‍–‍81 kg
IJF Grand Slam
Silver medal – second place	2018 Düsseldorf	‍–‍81 kg
Bronze medal – third place	2022 Tokyo	‍–‍81 kg
Bronze medal – third place	2023 Paris	‍–‍81 kg
Bronze medal – third place	2023 Antalya	‍–‍81 kg
Bronze medal – third place	2026 Dushanbe	‍–‍81 kg
IJF Grand Prix
Gold medal – first place	2022 Zagreb	‍–‍81 kg

Profile at external databases
- IJF: 22893
- JudoInside.com: 86879
- Updated on 2 May 2026

Alpha Oumar Djalo (born 5 September 1996), also known as Alpha Djalo, is a French judoka.

He won a silver medal in the mixed team event at the 2019 World Judo Championships.

Djalo represented France at the 2024 Summer Olympics, where he competed in the men's 81 kg event and won a gold medal in the mixed team event.

== Personal life ==
Djalo was born in Paris to a Senegalese father and Guinean mother.
