= Asya Tavano =

Italian judoka (born 2002)

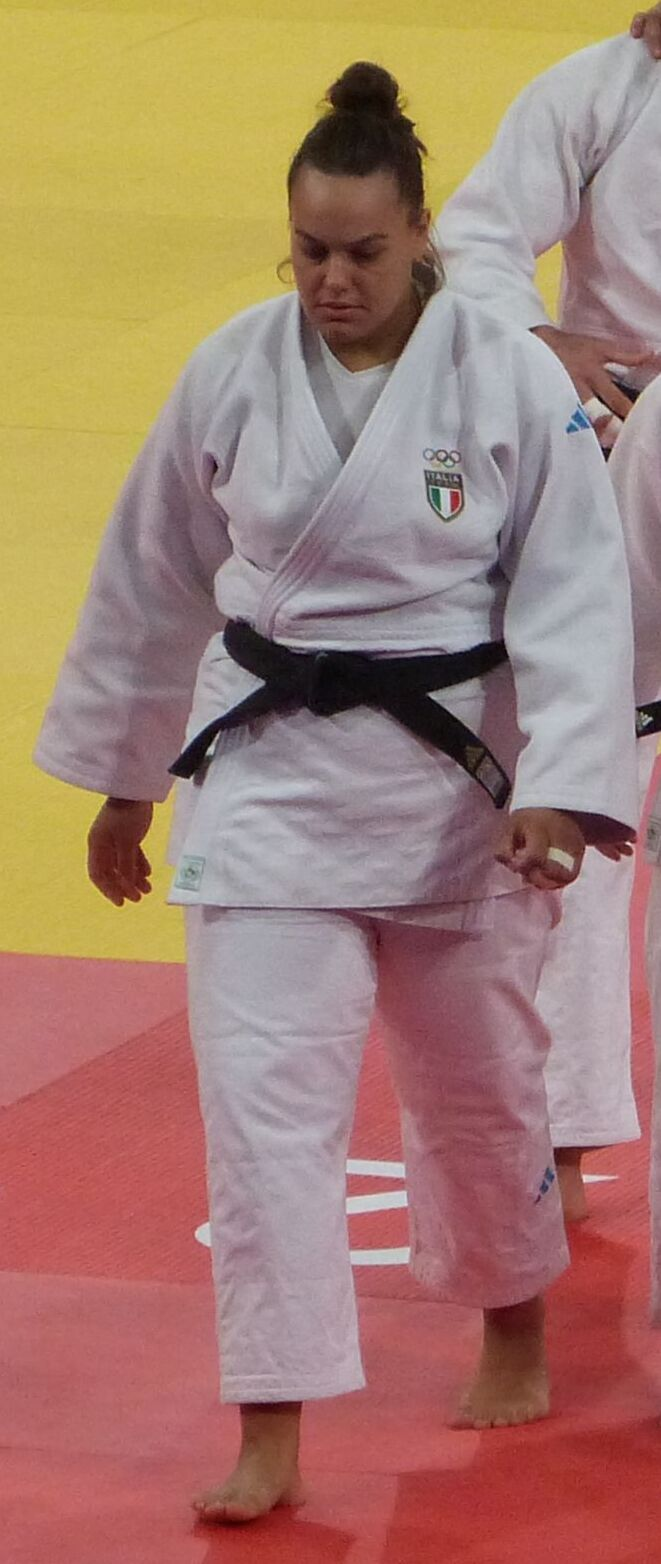
- Tavano in 2024

Personal information
- Born: 6 June 2002 (age 24)
- Occupation: Judoka

Sport
- Country: Italy
- Sport: Judo
- Weight class: +78 kg

Achievements and titles
- Olympic Games: R32 (2024)
- World Champ.: 5th (2026)
- European Champ.: (bronze) (2022, 2023, 2025, 2026)
Medal record
Women's judo
Representing Italy
European Championships
Silver medal – second place	2025 Podgorica	Mixed team
Bronze medal – third place	2022 Sofia	+78 kg
Bronze medal – third place	2023 Montpellier	+78 kg
Bronze medal – third place	2025 Podgorica	+78 kg
Bronze medal – third place	2026 Tbilisi	+78 kg
IJF Grand Slam
Gold medal – first place	2024 Dushanbe	+78 kg
Gold medal – first place	2026 Dushanbe	+78 kg
Silver medal – second place	2024 Baku	+78 kg
Bronze medal – third place	2024 Tbilisi	+78 kg
Bronze medal – third place	2026 Tbilisi	+78 kg
Bronze medal – third place	2026 Ulaanbaatar	+78 kg
Bronze medal – third place	2026 Abu Dhabi	+78 kg
IJF Grand Prix
Silver medal – second place	2023 Linz	+78 kg
Silver medal – second place	2026 Lima	+78 kg
European Junior Championships
Silver medal – second place	2022 Prague	+78 kg
European Cadet Championships
Bronze medal – third place	2019 Warsaw	+70 kg
Mediterranean Games
Gold medal – first place	2026 Taranto	Mixed team
Silver medal – second place	2026 Taranto	+78 kg

Profile at external databases
- IJF: 41951
- JudoInside.com: 115225
- Updated on 1 November 2026

Asya Tavano (born 6 June 2002) is an Italian judoka. She represented Italy at the 2024 Summer Olympics. She is a four-time European Judo Championships bronze medalist.

== Career ==
In May 2024, Tavano competed at the 2024 Judo Grand Slam Dushanbe and won her first career Judo Grand Slam gold medal in the +78 kg category. In August 2024, she represented Italy at the 2024 Summer Olympics in the +78 kg category and was eliminated in the first round by Serbia's Milica Žabić.

In April 2026, she competed at the 2026 European Judo Championships and won a bronze medal in the +78 kg category. This was her fourth bronze medal in the weight class at the European Judo Championships. The next month she competed at the 2026 Judo Grand Slam Dushanbe and won her second career Judo Grand Slam gold medal in the +78 kg category.

In August 2026, she competed at the 2026 Mediterranean Games and won a gold medal in the mixed team event and a silver medal in the +78 kg category. In October 2026, she competed at the 2026 World Judo Championships in the +78 kg category and lost in the quarterfinals to South Korea's Lee Hyeon-ji. In the repechage she defeated Olympic gold medalist Beatriz Souza to reach the bronze medal match. She lost to Russia's Mariia Ivanova in the bronze medal match.
