= 2026 Judo Grand Slam Tbilisi =

Judo competition

Judo 2026 Judo Grand Slam Tbilisi
- Venue: Olympic Palace
- Location: Tbilisi, Georgia
- Dates: 20–22 March 2026
- Competitors: 386 from 51 nations
- Total prize money: €154,000

Competition at external databases
- Links: IJF • JudoInside

The 2026 Judo Grand Slam Tbilisi is a Judo Grand Slam tournament that was held at the Olympic Palace in Tbilisi, Georgia, from 20 to 22 March 2026 as part of the IJF World Tour.

== Medal summary ==
=== Men's events ===
Event	Gold	Silver	Bronze
Extra-lightweight (−60 kg)	Izhak Ashpiz (ISR)	Achyty Dombuu (RUS)	Samariddin Kuchkarov (UZB)
Extra-lightweight (−60 kg)	Izhak Ashpiz (ISR)	Achyty Dombuu (RUS)	Talgat Orynbassar (KAZ)
Half-lightweight (−66 kg)	Nurkanat Serikbayev (KAZ)	Turan Bayramov (AZE)	Ramazan Abdulaev (RUS)
Half-lightweight (−66 kg)	Nurkanat Serikbayev (KAZ)	Turan Bayramov (AZE)	Tornike Gigauri (GEO)
Lightweight (−73 kg)	Leonardo Valeriani (ITA)	Valtteri Olin (FIN)	Giorgi Loladze (GEO)
Lightweight (−73 kg)	Leonardo Valeriani (ITA)	Valtteri Olin (FIN)	Hidayat Heydarov (AZE)
Half-middleweight (−81 kg)	Vedat Albayrak (TUR)	Mykhailo Svidrak (UKR)	Mihajlo Simin (SRB)
Half-middleweight (−81 kg)	Vedat Albayrak (TUR)	Mykhailo Svidrak (UKR)	Matthias Casse (BEL)
Middleweight (−90 kg)	Luka Maisuradze (GEO)	Nemanja Majdov (SRB)	Luka Javakhishvili (GEO)
Middleweight (−90 kg)	Luka Maisuradze (GEO)	Nemanja Majdov (SRB)	Guilherme Schimidt (BRA)
Half-heavyweight (−100 kg)	Idar Bifov (RUS)	Niyaz Bilalov (RUS)	Simeon Catharina (NED)
Half-heavyweight (−100 kg)	Idar Bifov (RUS)	Niyaz Bilalov (RUS)	Robert Florentino (DOM)
Heavyweight (+100 kg)	Irakli Demetrashvili (GEO)	Losseni Kone (GER)	Saba Inaneishvili (GEO)
Heavyweight (+100 kg)	Irakli Demetrashvili (GEO)	Losseni Kone (GER)	Jur Spijkers (NED)

=== Women's events ===
Event	Gold	Silver	Bronze
Extra-lightweight (−48 kg)	Tuğçe Beder (TUR)	Tara Babulfath (SWE)	Marina Vorobeva (RUS)
Extra-lightweight (−48 kg)	Tuğçe Beder (TUR)	Tara Babulfath (SWE)	Sabina Giliazova (RUS)
Half-lightweight (−52 kg)	Blandine Pont (FRA)	Tatum Keen (GBR)	Gabriela Dimitrova (BUL)
Half-lightweight (−52 kg)	Blandine Pont (FRA)	Tatum Keen (GBR)	Gefen Primo (ISR)
Lightweight (−57 kg)	Timna Nelson-Levy (ISR)	Inbal Shemesh (ISR)	Martha Fawaz (FRA)
Lightweight (−57 kg)	Timna Nelson-Levy (ISR)	Inbal Shemesh (ISR)	Pihla Salonen (FIN)
Half-middleweight (−63 kg)	Haruka Kaju (JPN)	Joanne van Lieshout (NED)	Kaja Kajzer (SLO)
Half-middleweight (−63 kg)	Haruka Kaju (JPN)	Joanne van Lieshout (NED)	Iva Oberan (CRO)
Middleweight (−70 kg)	Madina Taimazova (RUS)	Aoife Coughlan (AUS)	Ida Eriksson (SWE)
Middleweight (−70 kg)	Madina Taimazova (RUS)	Aoife Coughlan (AUS)	Shiho Tanaka (JPN)
Half-heavyweight (−78 kg)	Audrey Tcheuméo (FRA)	Alina Böhm (GER)	Yuliia Kurchenko (UKR)
Half-heavyweight (−78 kg)	Audrey Tcheuméo (FRA)	Alina Böhm (GER)	Milica Žabić (SRB)
Heavyweight (+78 kg)	Raz Hershko (ISR)	Léa Fontaine (FRA)	Asya Tavano (ITA)
Heavyweight (+78 kg)	Raz Hershko (ISR)	Léa Fontaine (FRA)	Célia Cancan (FRA)

=== Medal table ===
* Host nation (Georgia)

Rank	Nation	Gold	Silver	Bronze	Total
1	Israel (ISR)	3	1	1	5
2	Russia (RUS)	2	2	3	7
3	France (FRA)	2	1	2	5
4	Georgia (GEO)*	2	0	4	6
5	Turkey (TUR)	2	0	0	2
6	Italy (ITA)	1	0	1	2
6	Japan (JPN)	1	0	1	2
6	Kazakhstan (KAZ)	1	0	1	2
9	Germany (GER)	0	2	0	2
10	Netherlands (NED)	0	1	2	3
10	Serbia (SRB)	0	1	2	3
12	Azerbaijan (AZE)	0	1	1	2
12	Finland (FIN)	0	1	1	2
12	Sweden (SWE)	0	1	1	2
12	Ukraine (UKR)	0	1	1	2
16	Australia (AUS)	0	1	0	1
16	Great Britain (GBR)	0	1	0	1
18	Belgium (BEL)	0	0	1	1
18	Brazil (BRA)	0	0	1	1
18	Bulgaria (BUL)	0	0	1	1
18	Croatia (CRO)	0	0	1	1
18	Dominican Republic (DOM)	0	0	1	1
18	Slovenia (SLO)	0	0	1	1
18	Uzbekistan (UZB)	0	0	1	1
Totals (24 entries)		14	14	28	56

== Prize money ==
The sums written are per medalist, bringing the total prizes awarded to €154,000. (retrieved from:)

Medal	Total	Judoka	Coach
Gold	€5,000	€4,000	€1,000
Silver	€3,000	€2,400	€600
Bronze	€1,500	€1,200	€300
