= 2026 Judo Grand Slam Abu Dhabi =

Judo competition

Judo 2026 Judo Grand Slam Abu Dhabi
- Venue: Mubadala Arena
- Location: Abu Dhabi, United Arab Emirates
- Dates: 29–31 October 2026
- Competitors: 374 from 59 nations
- Total prize money: €154,000

Competition at external databases
- Links: IJF • JudoInside

The 2026 Judo Grand Slam Abu Dhabi is a Judo Grand Slam tournament that was held at the Mubadala Arena in Abu Dhabi, United Arab Emirates from 29 to 31 October 2026 as part of the IJF World Tour and during the 2028 Summer Olympics qualification period.

== Medal summary ==
=== Men's events ===
Event	Gold	Silver	Bronze
Extra-lightweight (−60 kg)	Balabay Aghayev (AZE)	Loiq Kudbudinov (TJK)	Talgat Orynbassar (KAZ)
Extra-lightweight (−60 kg)	Balabay Aghayev (AZE)	Loiq Kudbudinov (TJK)	Kamoliddin Bakhtiyorov (UZB)
Half-lightweight (−66 kg)	Sukhrob Boqiev (BHR)	Yago Abuladze (RUS)	Iskandar Mahmadkhojazoda (TJK)
Half-lightweight (−66 kg)	Sukhrob Boqiev (BHR)	Yago Abuladze (RUS)	Rashad Yelkiyev (AZE)
Lightweight (−73 kg)	Hassan Doukkali (MAR)	Ahmadzod Masudi (TJK)	Hidayat Heydarov (AZE)
Lightweight (−73 kg)	Hassan Doukkali (MAR)	Ahmadzod Masudi (TJK)	Karen Galstian (RUS)
Half-middleweight (−81 kg)	Petru Pelivan (MDA)	Eetu Ihanamäki (FIN)	Dimitri Gochilaidze (GEO)
Half-middleweight (−81 kg)	Petru Pelivan (MDA)	Eetu Ihanamäki (FIN)	Igor Tsurkan (SLO)
Middleweight (−90 kg)	Ivaylo Ivanov (BUL)	Mihail Latișev (MDA)	Mansur Lorsanov (RUS)
Middleweight (−90 kg)	Ivaylo Ivanov (BUL)	Mihail Latișev (MDA)	Kenny Komi Bedel (ITA)
Half-heavyweight (−100 kg)	Idar Bifov (RUS)	Aurélien Diesse (FRA)	Anton Savytskiy (UKR)
Half-heavyweight (−100 kg)	Idar Bifov (RUS)	Aurélien Diesse (FRA)	Marat Baikamurov (KAZ)
Heavyweight (+100 kg)	Irakli Demetrashvili (GEO)	Ushangi Kokauri (AZE)	Denis Batchaev (RUS)
Heavyweight (+100 kg)	Irakli Demetrashvili (GEO)	Ushangi Kokauri (AZE)	Saba Inaneishvili (GEO)

=== Women's events ===
Event	Gold	Silver	Bronze
Extra-lightweight (−48 kg)	Konul Aliyeva (AZE)	Merve Azak (TUR)	Sıla Ersin (TUR)
Extra-lightweight (−48 kg)	Konul Aliyeva (AZE)	Merve Azak (TUR)	Marina Vorobeva (RUS)
Half-lightweight (−52 kg)	Tihea Topolovec (CRO)	Amandine Buchard (FRA)	Gefen Primo (ISR)
Half-lightweight (−52 kg)	Tihea Topolovec (CRO)	Amandine Buchard (FRA)	Róza Gyertyás (HUN)
Lightweight (−57 kg)	Martha Fawaz (FRA)	Shirlen Nascimento (BRA)	Ana Viktorija Puljiz (CRO)
Lightweight (−57 kg)	Martha Fawaz (FRA)	Shirlen Nascimento (BRA)	Huh Mi-mi (KOR)
Half-middleweight (−63 kg)	Angelika Szymańska (POL)	Anna Kriza (HUN)	Kaja Kajzer Žabkar (SLO)
Half-middleweight (−63 kg)	Angelika Szymańska (POL)	Anna Kriza (HUN)	Laura Fazliu (KOS)
Middleweight (−70 kg)	Taís Pina (POR)	Kaillany Cardoso (BRA)	Aoife Coughlan (AUS)
Middleweight (−70 kg)	Taís Pina (POR)	Kaillany Cardoso (BRA)	Luana Carvalho (BRA)
Half-heavyweight (−78 kg)	Yelyzaveta Lytvynenko (UAE)	Patrícia Sampaio (POR)	Yael van Heemst (NED)
Half-heavyweight (−78 kg)	Yelyzaveta Lytvynenko (UAE)	Patrícia Sampaio (POR)	Emma Reid (GBR)
Heavyweight (+78 kg)	Helena Vuković (CRO)	Raz Hershko (ISR)	Asya Tavano (ITA)
Heavyweight (+78 kg)	Helena Vuković (CRO)	Raz Hershko (ISR)	Erica Simonetti (ITA)

=== Medal table ===
* Host nation (United Arab Emirates)

Rank	Nation	Gold	Silver	Bronze	Total
1	Azerbaijan (AZE)	2	1	2	5
2	Croatia (CRO)	2	0	1	3
3	France (FRA)	1	2	0	3
4	Russia (RUS)	1	1	4	6
5	Moldova (MDA)	1	1	0	2
5	Portugal (POR)	1	1	0	2
7	Georgia (GEO)	1	0	2	3
8	Bahrain (BHR)	1	0	0	1
8	Bulgaria (BUL)	1	0	0	1
8	Morocco (MAR)	1	0	0	1
8	Poland (POL)	1	0	0	1
8	United Arab Emirates (UAE)*	1	0	0	1
13	Brazil (BRA)	0	2	1	3
13	Tajikistan (TJK)	0	2	1	3
15	Hungary (HUN)	0	1	1	2
15	Israel (ISR)	0	1	1	2
15	Turkey (TUR)	0	1	1	2
18	Finland (FIN)	0	1	0	1
19	Italy (ITA)	0	0	3	3
20	Kazakhstan (KAZ)	0	0	2	2
20	Slovenia (SLO)	0	0	2	2
22	Australia (AUS)	0	0	1	1
22	Great Britain (GBR)	0	0	1	1
22	Kosovo (KOS)	0	0	1	1
22	Netherlands (NED)	0	0	1	1
22	South Korea (KOR)	0	0	1	1
22	Ukraine (UKR)	0	0	1	1
22	Uzbekistan (UZB)	0	0	1	1
Totals (28 entries)		14	14	28	56

== Prize money ==
The sums written are per medalist, bringing the total prizes awarded to €154,000. (retrieved from:)

Medal	Total	Judoka	Coach
Gold	€5,000	€4,000	€1,000
Silver	€3,000	€2,400	€600
Bronze	€1,500	€1,200	€300
