= Askerbii Gerbekov =

Russian-born Bahraini judoka (born 1996)

Personal information
- Native name: Аскербий Иссаевич Гербеков
- Full name: Askerbii Issayevich Gerbekov
- Born: 1 June 1996 (age 30) Roscha, Stavropol Krai, Russia
- Occupation: Judoka
- Height: 176 cm (5 ft 9 in)

Sport
- Country: Russia (until 2021); Bahrain (since 2022)
- Sport: Judo
- Weight class: ‍–‍81 kg

Achievements and titles
- Olympic Games: R32 (2024)
- World Champ.: R32 (2022)
- Asian Champ.: (bronze) (2026)
Medal record
Men's judo
Representing Bahrain
Asian Championships
Bronze medal – third place	2026 Ordos	‍–‍81 kg
IJF Grand Slam
Bronze medal – third place	2022 Baku	‍–‍81 kg
Bronze medal – third place	2024 Baku	‍–‍81 kg
Bronze medal – third place	2025 Baku	‍–‍81 kg
Bronze medal – third place	2025 Ulaanbaatar	‍–‍81 kg
IJF Grand Prix
Bronze medal – third place	2023 Zagreb	‍–‍81 kg
Bronze medal – third place	2025 Qingdao	‍–‍81 kg
Men's sambo
Representing Russia
European Championships
Gold medal – first place	2021 Limassol	‍–‍79 kg

Profile at external databases
- IJF: 65877, 46392
- JudoInside.com: 54435
- Updated on 7 October 2026

Askerbii Issayevich Gerbekov (Russian: Аскербий Иссаевич Гербеков, born 1 June 1996) is a Russian-born Bahraini judoka and sambist. He was the 2021 European Champion in sambo, and a bronze medalist at the Judo Grand Slam in 2022, 2024, and 2025.

== Background ==
He was born in Roscha township, Stavropol Krai, Russia. He started judo and sambo at the age of 13 under his first coach Murat Salpagarov.

== Career ==
=== Age-group ===
In 2016, he won the Junior Sambo Russian championships at 74 kilos. After the Russian championships he became third at the Junior World championships in Romania. In 2018, he came in third at the U23 Judo Russian championships in Smolensk.

=== Senior level ===
In 2019, he claimed the gold medal at the World Police Games held in Milan, Italy as a Bahraini athlete. In 2021, he was runner-up at the Sambo Russian championships and made the European team. At the Sambo European championships he earned the gold medal at 79 kilos, in the final match he over Ivan Harkov of Bulgaria In 2022, he was 3rd at the Grand Slam Baku and won the African Open in the judo 81 kg event. In 2023, he won the Asian Open in Hong Kong and took the bronze medal from the Grand Prix in Zagreb. In 2024, he won the bronze medal at the Grand Slam in Baku.

== Achievements ==
- Sambo:
  - 2016 Junior Russian championships — 1st;
  - 2016 Junior World championships — 3rd;
  - 2021 Senior Russian championships — 2nd;
  - 2021 Senior European championships — 1st;
- Judo:
  - 2018 U23 Russian championships — 3rd;
  - 2019 World Police Games — 1st;
  - 2022, 2024 Grand Slam Baku — 3rd;
  - 2023 Grand Prix Zagreb — 3rd;
