= Wachid Borchashvili =

Austrian judoka (born 1998)

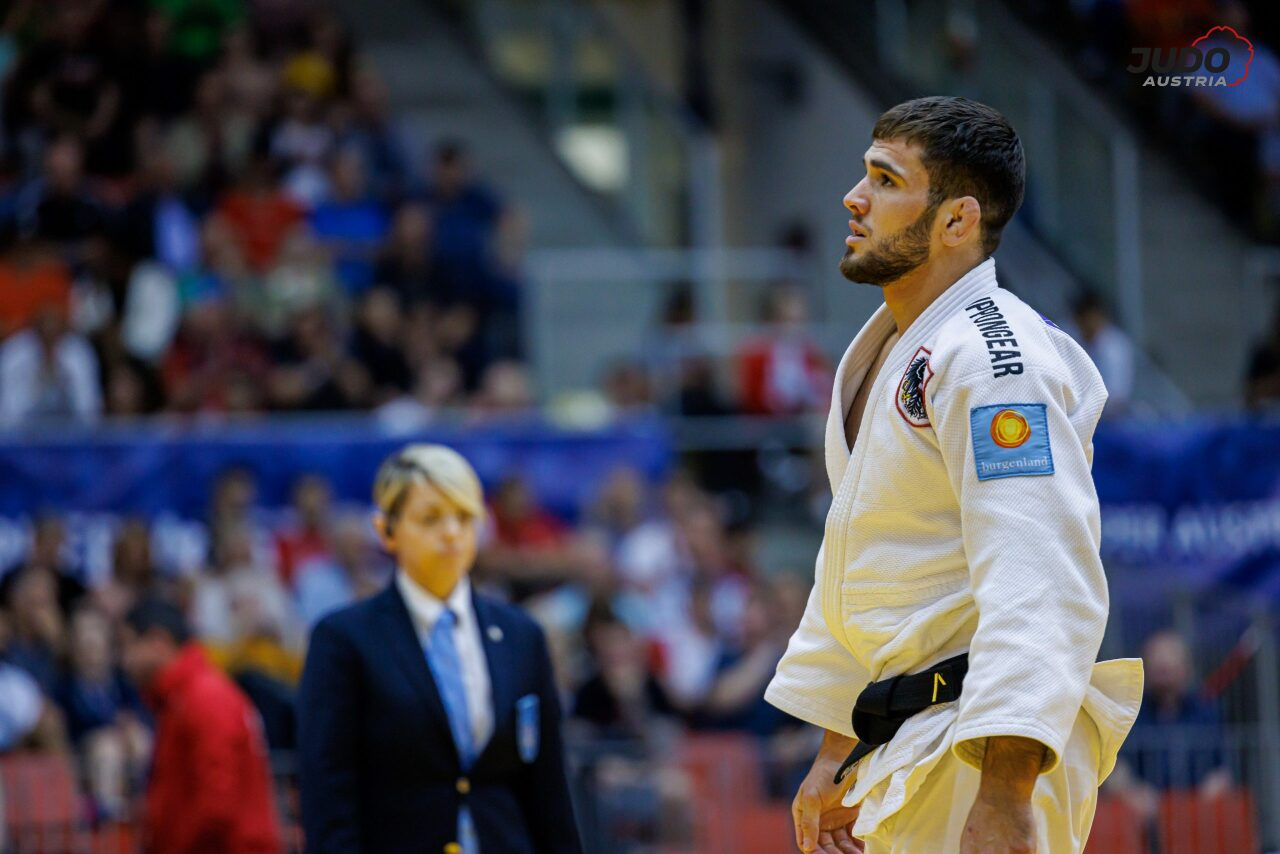

Personal information
- Born: 24 September 1998 (age 27)
- Occupation: Judoka
- Years active: 2017-2024

Sport
- Country: Austria
- Sport: Judo
- Weight class: ‍–‍81 kg
- Rank: 1st dan black belt
- League: Austrian 1. Bundesliga
- Club: Judo LZ Wels
- Turned pro: 2018
- Coached by: Yvonne Snir-Bönisch
- Retired: August 2024

Achievements and titles
- Olympic Games: R16 (2024)
- World Champ.: 7th (2023)
- European Champ.: 5th (2023)
Medal record
Men's judo
Representing Austria
IJF Grand Slam
Gold medal – first place	2023 Tbilisi	‍–‍81 kg
Silver medal – second place	2024 Dushanbe	‍–‍81 kg
Bronze medal – third place	2023 Abu Dhabi	‍–‍81 kg
IJF Grand Prix
Bronze medal – third place	2021 Zagreb	‍–‍90 kg
European U23 Championships
Bronze medal – third place	2019 Izhevsk	‍–‍73 kg
European Junior Championships
Bronze medal – third place	2018 Sofia	‍–‍66 kg

Profile at external databases
- IJF: 41411
- JudoInside.com: 87481
- Updated on 31 July 2024

Wachid Borchashvili (born 24 September 1998) is an Austrian judoka and four-time Austrian judo national champion. He holds the rank of Shodan.

== Biography ==
Borchashvili won his first European Open in Oberwart in February 2020. After the COVID-19 pandemic, he finished 5th at the European Open in Zagreb in May 2021.

=== Qualification for the 2024 Olympic Games ===
After competing in these competitions in the weight class -81 kg, he tried to gain a foothold in the higher weight class -90 kg the next year. Although he was able to achieve both 3rd and 7th place in Grand Prix events, he decided to compete in the qualification tournaments for the 2024 Olympic Games in the weight class -81 kg in 2023. His brother Shamil also tried to get the one Austrian spot for the Olympics in the same weight class.

=== Disciplinary proceedings ===
In August 2023, it became known that Borchashvili had physically attacked a training partner during a training course. After disciplinary proceedings, the Austrian Judo Federation announced that Wachid Borchashvili was banned from the 2023 Judo World Masters in Budapest. After winning the bronze medal at the 2024 Judo Grand Prix Linz, Laurin Böhler announced in an ORF interview that he had been attacked by his teammate Borchashvili. He complained that the consequences were too mild and that the training climate had deteriorated since then.

=== 2024 Olympic Games ===
In the qualification period for the 2024 Olympic Games, Borchashvili won a gold, a silver and a bronze medal at Grand Slam tournaments and had collected 3240 points in the IJF Olympic Ranking. However, his brother Shamil had achieved 3746 points. Since only one athlete was allowed to compete per country and weight class, this would have meant that Shamil and not Wachid would have represented Austria at the Olympic Games. However, he waived his place at the 2024 Summer Olympics in Paris, so Wachid took his spot. He took part in the Games in the -81 kg weight class as well as in the mixed team (together with Katharina Tanzer, Lubjana Piovesana, Michaela Polleres, Samuel Gaßner and Aaron Fara). He competed with an injured meniscus. In the individual competition, he had to admit defeat after a victory against Mohammad Samim Faizad (AFG), the later silver medal winner, Tato Grigalashvili (GEO). The first encounter in the mixed team competition against Germany ended 4:1. The Austrian team therefore took 9th place.

After the Olympic Games, he ended his career in November 2024.

== Personal life ==
His brothers Shamil and Kimran are also part of the national team. Shamil won the bronze medal at the Olympic Games in judo. In the fall of 2024, the Borchashvili brothers founded a new martial arts club.
