= Khrystyna Homan =

Ukrainian judoka (born 1999)

Personal information
- Born: 31 January 1999 (age 26); Slavutych, Kyiv oblast, Ukraine
- Occupation: Judoka

Sport
- Country: Ukraine
- Sport: Judo
- Weight class: +78 kg
- Coached by: Serhiy Dubrova, Oleh Kopylov

Achievements and titles
- Olympic Games: R32 (2024)
- European Champ.: 7th (2023)

Profile at external databases
- IJF: 54843
- JudoInside.com: 126739
- Updated on 6 August 2024

Khrystyna Homan (Ukrainian: Христина Костянтинівна Гоман; born 31 January 1999 in Slavutych, Ukraine) is a Ukrainian judoka. She represented her country at the 2024 Summer Olympics. In the first round, she lost to Marit Kamps from the Netherlands.

At the 2023 European Championships in Montpellier, she finished 7th after defeating Kinga Wolszczak from Poland and Rochele Nunes from Portugal but losing to Marit Kamps and Karen Stevenson (both Dutch athletes). At the 2024 European Championships in Zagreb, she lost in the first round to Austrian Maria Höllwart.

She studied at the Taras Shevchenko Chernihiv National Pedagogical University and Sumy State University.
