= Romane Dicko =

French judoka (born 1999)

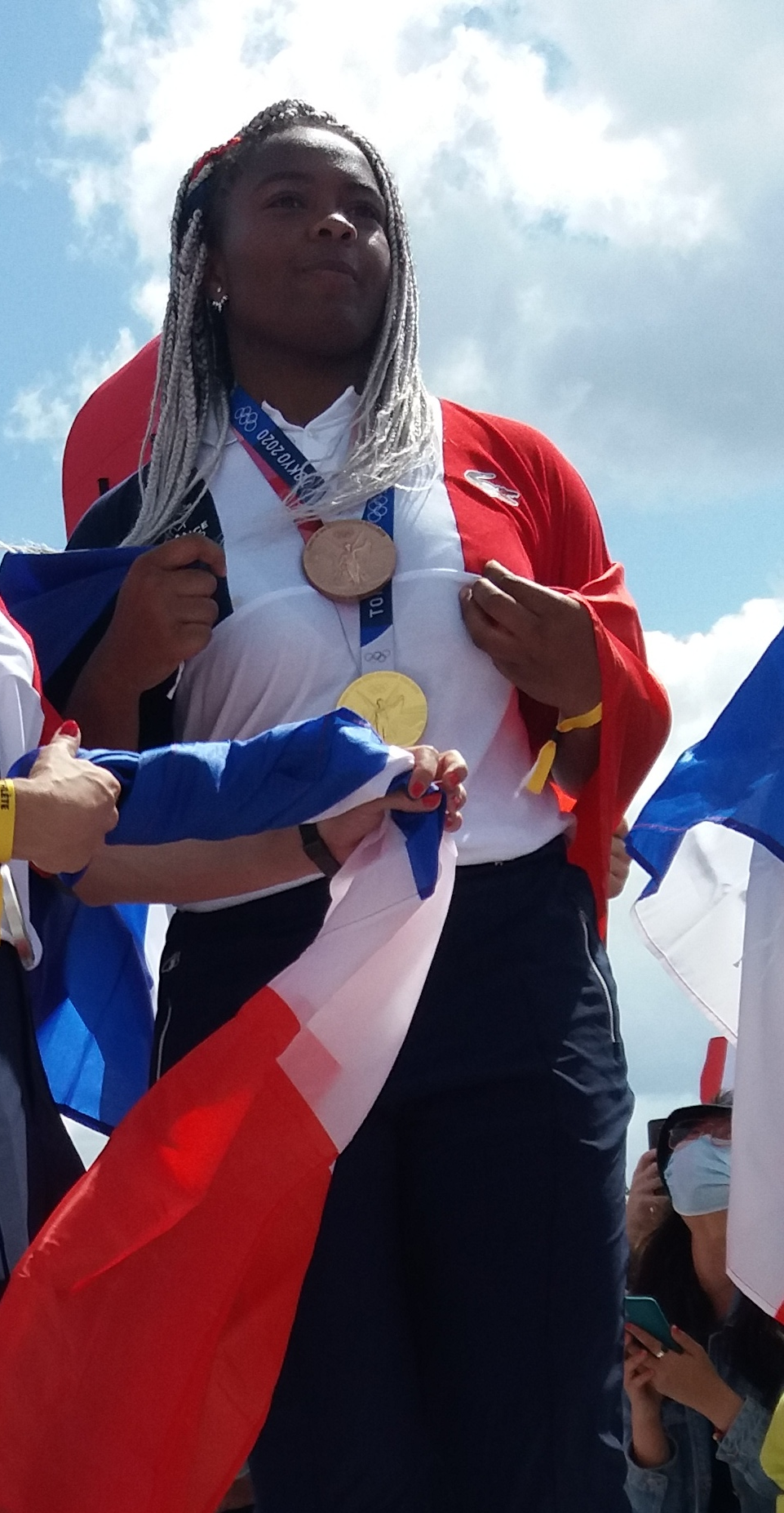
- Dicko at the 2020 Summer Olympics

Personal information
- Born: 30 September 1999 (age 27) Clamart, France
- Occupation: Judoka

Sport
- Country: France
- Sport: Judo
- Weight class: +78 kg

Achievements and titles
- Olympic Games: (bronze) (2020, 2024)
- World Champ.: (gold) (2022)
- European Champ.: (gold) (2018, 2020, 2022, 2023, 2025)
- Highest world ranking: 1^{st}
Medal record
Women's judo
Representing France
Olympic Games
Gold medal – first place	2020 Tokyo	Mixed team
Gold medal – first place	2024 Paris	Mixed team
Bronze medal – third place	2020 Tokyo	+78 kg
Bronze medal – third place	2024 Paris	+78 kg
World Championships
Gold medal – first place	2022 Tashkent	+78 kg
Silver medal – second place	2022 Tashkent	Mixed team
Silver medal – second place	2023 Doha	Mixed team
Silver medal – second place	2026 Baku	+78 kg
Bronze medal – third place	2017 Budapest	Mixed team
Bronze medal – third place	2025 Budapest	+78 kg
European Championships
Gold medal – first place	2018 Tel Aviv	+78 kg
Gold medal – first place	2020 Prague	+78 kg
Gold medal – first place	2022 Sofia	+78 kg
Gold medal – first place	2023 Montpellier	+78 kg
Gold medal – first place	2025 Podgorica	+78 kg
Bronze medal – third place	2026 Tbilisi	+78 kg
World Masters
Gold medal – first place	2021 Doha	+78 kg
Gold medal – first place	2022 Jerusalem	+78 kg
Gold medal – first place	2023 Budapest	+78 kg
IJF Grand Slam
Gold medal – first place	2020 Paris	+78 kg
Gold medal – first place	2021 Tel Aviv	+78 kg
Gold medal – first place	2021 Kazan	+78 kg
Gold medal – first place	2022 Tel Aviv	+78 kg
Gold medal – first place	2024 Paris	+78 kg
Gold medal – first place	2024 Baku	+78 kg
Gold medal – first place	2024 Astana	+78 kg
Gold medal – first place	2025 Tbilisi	+78 kg
Gold medal – first place	2026 Paris	+78 kg
Silver medal – second place	2022 Paris	+78 kg
Silver medal – second place	2026 Ulaanbaatar	+78 kg
Silver medal – second place	2026 Lausanne	+78 kg
Bronze medal – third place	2023 Paris	+78 kg
Bronze medal – third place	2023 Antalya	+78 kg
Bronze medal – third place	2025 Tokyo	+78 kg
IJF Grand Prix
Gold medal – first place	2018 Tbilisi	+78 kg
Gold medal – first place	2020 Tel Aviv	+78 kg
European Junior Championships
Gold medal – first place	2017 Maribor	+78 kg
Gold medal – first place	2017 Maribor	Women's team
European Cadet Championships
Gold medal – first place	2016 Vantaa	+70 kg

Profile at external databases
- IJF: 30629
- JudoInside.com: 93035
- Updated on 10 October 2026

Romane Dicko (born 30 September 1999) is a French judoka. In 2021, she won one of the bronze medals in the women's +78 kg event at the 2020 Summer Olympics held in Tokyo, Japan. She also won bronze at the 2024 Summer Olympics in Paris, France. Dicko won gold in her event at the 2022 World Judo Championships held in Tashkent, Uzbekistan and she is a five-time gold medalist at the European Judo Championships.

== Career ==
Dicko won the gold medal in the women's +78 kg event at the 2020 European Judo Championships held in Prague, Czech Republic.

In 2021, Dicko won the gold medal in her event at the Judo World Masters held in Doha, Qatar. A month later, she won the gold medal in her event at the 2021 Judo Grand Slam Tel Aviv held in Tel Aviv, Israel.

Dicko represented France at the 2020 Summer Olympics in Tokyo, Japan. She won the bronze medal in her match against Kayra Sayit of Turkey. She also won the gold medal in the mixed team event.

Dicko won the silver medal in her event at the 2022 Judo Grand Slam Paris held in Paris, France. She won the gold medal in her event at the 2022 Judo Grand Slam Tel Aviv held in Tel Aviv, Israel.

== Other media ==
In 2025, Dicko competed on the seventh season of Mask Singer, the French version of the global franchise Masked Singer, disguised as a red panda named Panda Roux.

== Personal life ==
Born in France, Dicko is of Cameroonian descent.

== Achievements ==
Year	Tournament	Place	Weight class
2017	World Championships	3rd	Mixed team
2018	European Championships	1st	+78 kg
2020	European Championships	1st	+78 kg
2021	Summer Olympics	3rd	+78 kg
2021	Summer Olympics	1st	Mixed team
2022	European Championships	1st	+78 kg
2022	World Championships	1st	+78 kg
2022	World Championships	2nd	Mixed team
2024	Summer Olympics	3rd	+78 kg
2024	Summer Olympics	1st	Mixed team
