= François Gauthier-Drapeau =

Canadian judoka (born 1998)

Personal information
- Born: 27 January 1998 (age 28) Alma, Quebec, Canada
- Occupation: Judoka
- Height: 185 cm (6 ft 1 in)

Sport
- Country: Canada
- Sport: Judo
- Weight class: ‍–‍73 kg, ‍–‍81 kg

Achievements and titles
- Olympic Games: 7th (2024)
- World Champ.: 5th (2023)
- Pan American Champ.: (gold) (2023)
- Commonwealth Games: (silver) (2022)
- Highest world ranking: 2^{nd}
Medal record
Men's judo
Representing Canada
Pan American Championships
Gold medal – first place	2023 Calgary	‍–‍81 kg
Silver medal – second place	2024 Rio de Janeiro	‍–‍81 kg
Bronze medal – third place	2022 Lima	‍–‍81 kg
IJF Grand Slam
Gold medal – first place	2025 Paris	‍–‍81 kg
Gold medal – first place	2025 Abu Dhabi	‍–‍81 kg
Silver medal – second place	2024 Antalya	‍–‍81 kg
Silver medal – second place	2025 Baku	‍–‍81 kg
Bronze medal – third place	2021 Baku	‍–‍81 kg
Bronze medal – third place	2022 Tel Aviv	‍–‍81 kg
Bronze medal – third place	2023 Paris	‍–‍81 kg
Bronze medal – third place	2023 Tel Aviv	‍–‍81 kg
Bronze medal – third place	2023 Antalya	‍–‍81 kg
Bronze medal – third place	2024 Paris	‍–‍81 kg
Bronze medal – third place	2024 Tokyo	‍–‍81 kg
IJF Grand Prix
Gold medal – first place	2026 Zagreb	‍–‍81 kg
Silver medal – second place	2026 Lima	‍–‍81 kg
Pan American Junior Championships
Bronze medal – third place	2016 Cordoba	‍–‍73 kg
Commonwealth Games
Silver medal – second place	2022 Birmingham	‍–‍81 kg

Profile at external databases
- IJF: 32154
- JudoInside.com: 73198
- Updated on 15 November 2026

François Gauthier-Drapeau (born 27 January 1998) is a Canadian judoka who competes in the men's 81 kg category and formerly in the 73 kg category. Gauthier-Drapeau was born in Alma, Quebec, Canada. Gauthier-Drapeau has won multiple medals at the World and Pan-American level.

== Career ==
=== Junior ===
At the 2016 Pan American Junior Judo Championships in Buenos Aires, Argentina, Gauthier-Drapeau won the bronze medal in the 73 kg category.

=== Senior ===
After a few years of inactivity due to an injury and the COVID-19 pandemic, Gauthier-Drapeau returned to competition at the 2021 Judo Grand Slam Paris in the 81 kg category, where he lost in overtime to the then number two world ranked Matthias Casse of Belgium. This tournament marked his first ever Grand Slam. The following month, in his second Grand Slam, Gauthier-Drapeau won bronze at the 2021 Judo Grand Slam Baku.

Gauthier-Drapeau started the 2022 season with a fifth place finish at the Paris Grand Slam, losing the bronze medal match in overtime. A couple weeks later, Gauthier-Drapeau would win bronze at the 2022 Judo Grand Slam Tel Aviv. In April 2022, at the combined 2022 Pan American-Oceania Judo Championships in Lima, Peru, Gauthier-Drapeau won the bronze medal in the 81 kg category. Another fifth finish followed at the 2022 Judo Grand Slam Budapest.

Gauthier-Drapeau was named to his first national senior multi-sport event team for the 2022 Commonwealth Games in June 2022. In June 2024, Gauthier-Drapeau was named to Canada's 2024 Olympic team.

== See also ==
- Judo in Quebec
- Judo in Canada
- List of Canadian judoka
