= Conson Stadium =

Sports venue in Qingdao, China

Coordinates: 36°06′12″N 120°26′26″E

Qingdao Conson Stadium
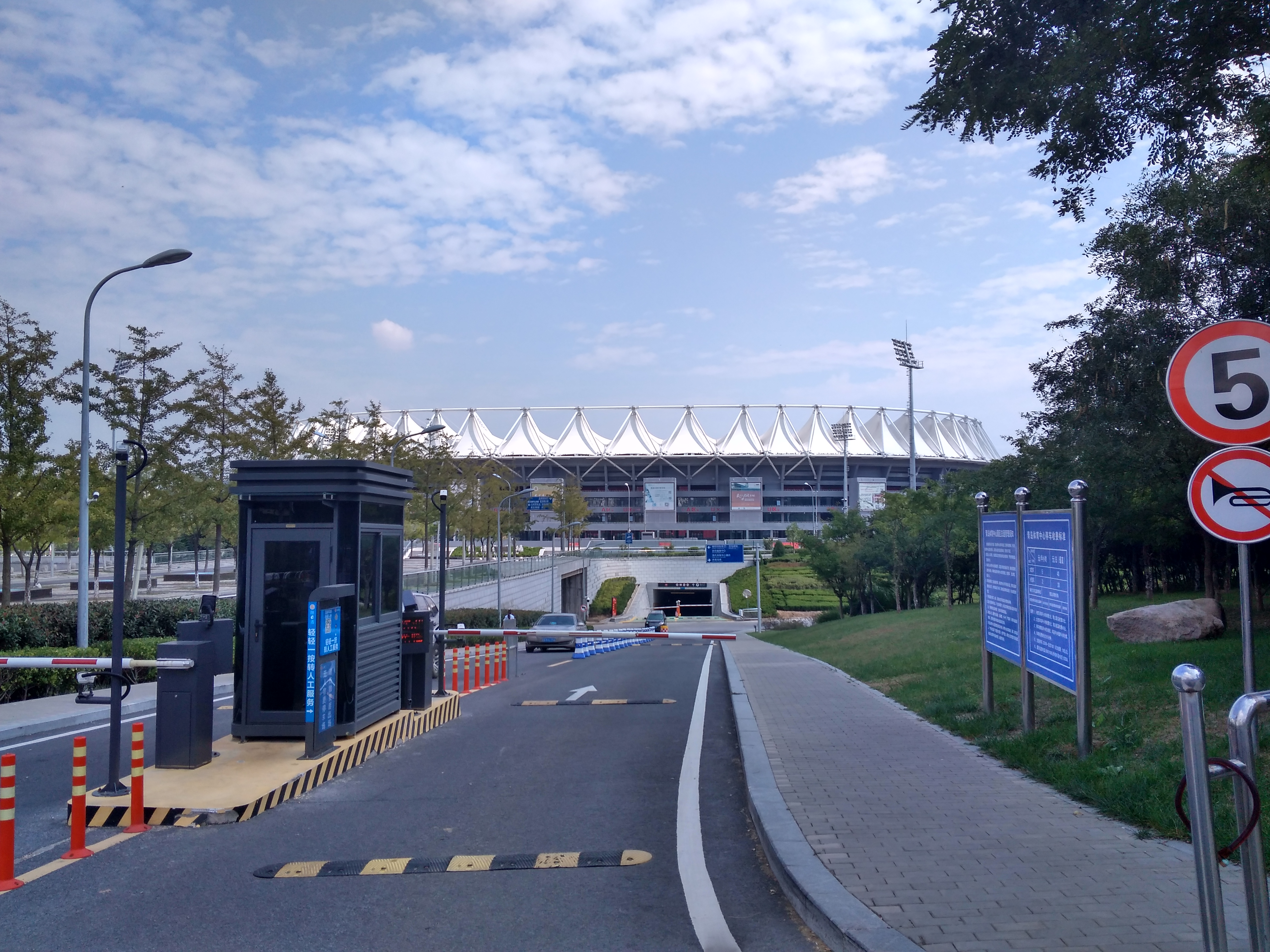
- Interactive map of Qingdao Conson Stadium
- Location: Qingdao, Shandong, People's Republic of China
- Owner: Qingdao Conson Development (Group) Co. Ltd
- Capacity: 45,000

Construction
- Groundbreaking: February 1996
- Opened: August 1999
- Renovated: March–October 2012

Tenant
- Qingdao Huanghai

The Qingdao Sports Center Stadium or officially Qingdao Conson Stadium (Chinese: 青岛国信体育场 formerly also called Guoxin Stadium) is a multi-purpose stadium in Qingdao, Shandong, China. It is currently holds 45,000 people and used mostly for association football matches.

The stadium was invested by Qingdao Etsong Tobacco Group and opened in August 1999 as Etsong Sports Center Stadium (颐中体育中心体育场). It was the home stadium of Qingdao Etsong Hainiu and Qingdao Hailifeng. The stadium was abandoned in 2006 due to safety problems. Qingdao Conson Development Group took charge the stadium in July 2008 and changed its name as Qingdao Conson Stadium. The stadium was renovated in 2012.

== See also ==
- Conson Gymnasium
- Sports in China
- List of football stadiums in China
- List of stadiums in China
- Lists of stadiums
