= Sophio Somkhishvili =

Georgian judoka (born 2000)

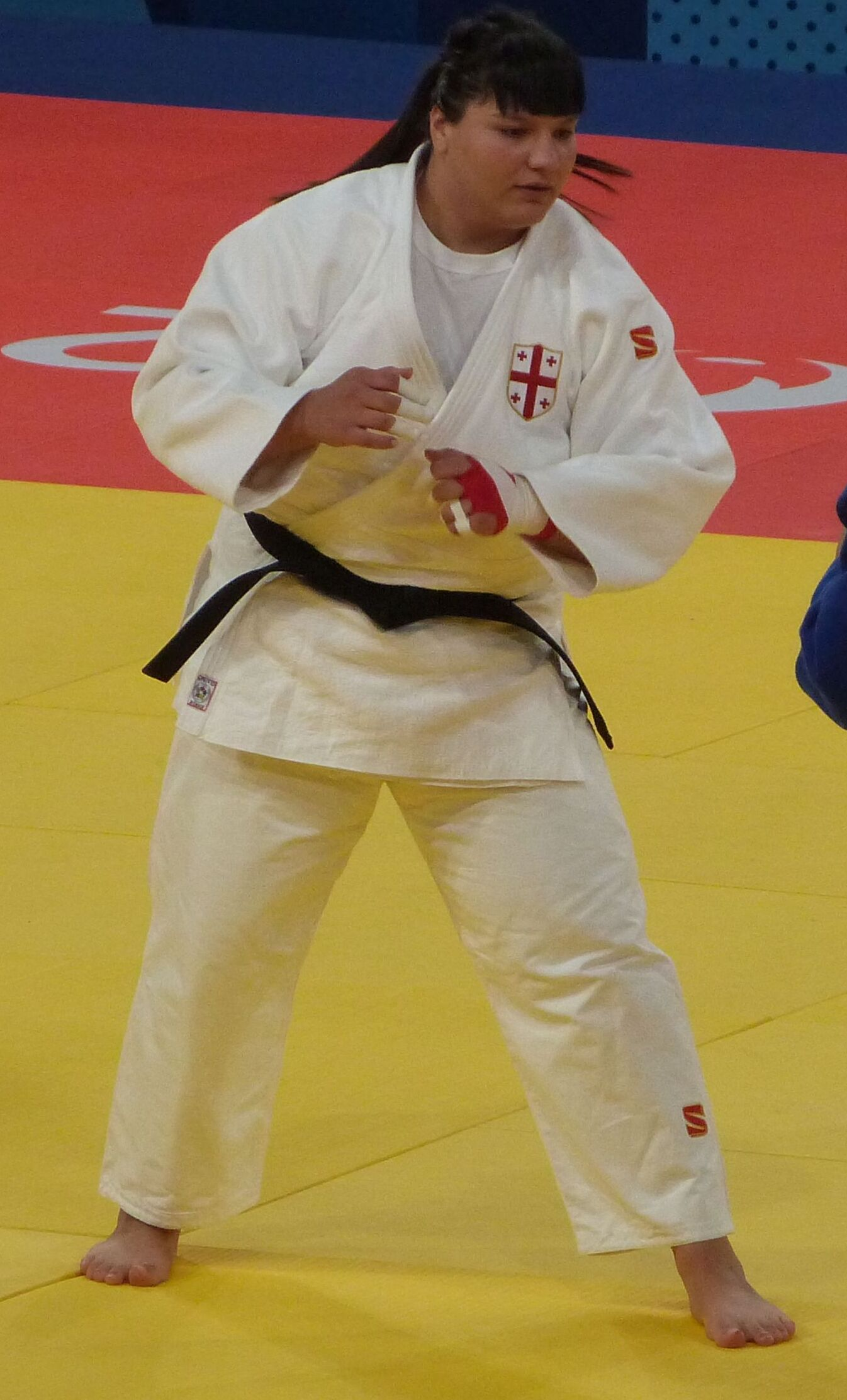

Personal information
- Born: 17 March 2000 (age 26) Tbilisi, Georgia
- Occupation: Judoka
- Height: 1.70 m (5 ft 7 in)

Sport
- Country: Georgia
- Sport: Judo
- Weight class: +78 kg

Achievements and titles
- Olympic Games: R16 (2024)
- World Champ.: R16 (2023, 2025)
- European Champ.: R16 (2021, 2023, 2024, 2025, 2026)
Medal record
Women's judo
Representing Georgia
World Championships
| Gold medal – first place | 2025 Budapest | Mixed team |
| Bronze medal – third place | 2023 Doha | Mixed team |
| Bronze medal – third place | 2024 Abu Dhabi | Mixed team |
| Bronze medal – third place | 2026 Baku | Mixed team |
European Games
| Gold medal – first place | 2023 Kraków | Mixed team |
European Championships
| Gold medal – first place | 2021 Ufa | Mixed team |
| Gold medal – first place | 2025 Podgorica | Mixed team |
| Silver medal – second place | 2024 Zagreb | Mixed team |
IJF Grand Slam
| Silver medal – second place | 2022 Abu Dhabi | +78 kg |
| Bronze medal – third place | 2022 Tbilisi | +78 kg |
World University Games
| Bronze medal – third place | 2025 Essen | +78 kg |
European U23 Championships
| Silver medal – second place | 2021 Budapest | +78 kg |
European Junior Championships
| Bronze medal – third place | 2018 Sofia | +78 kg |
World Cadets Championships
| Silver medal – second place | 2017 Santiago | +70 kg |
European Cadet Championships
| Gold medal – first place | 2017 Kaunas | +70 kg |
| Silver medal – second place | 2016 Vantaa | +70 kg |

Profile at external databases
- IJF: 20250
- JudoInside.com: 95749
- Updated on 19 April 2026

Sophio Somkhishvili (Georgian: სოფიო სომხიშვილი; born 17 March 2000) is a Georgian judoka. She is a two-time medalist at the World Judo Championships.

At the 2023 World Championships, Somkhishvili reached the round of 16 in the +78 kg event, while in the mixed team event, she was part of the Georgian team who won their repechage, thus winning a bronze medal. At the 2024 World Championships, she won another bronze medal in the mixed team event as her team clinched the bronze medal before she had a chance to play in the repechage against Germany.
