= Léa Fontaine =

French judoka (born 2000)

Personal information
- Born: 7 December 2000 (age 25)
- Occupation: Judoka

Sport
- Country: France
- Sport: Judo
- Weight class: +78 kg

Achievements and titles
- World Champ.: 7th (2024)
- European Champ.: (silver) (2021, 2026)
Medal record
Women's judo
Representing France
World Championships
Silver medal – second place	2021 Budapest	Mixed team
Silver medal – second place	2024 Abu Dhabi	Mixed team
European Championships
Gold medal – first place	2022 Mulhouse	Mixed team
Gold medal – first place	2024 Zagreb	Mixed team
Silver medal – second place	2021 Lisbon	+78 kg
Silver medal – second place	2026 Tbilisi	+78 kg
Bronze medal – third place	2024 Zagreb	+78 kg
IJF Grand Slam
Gold medal – first place	2022 Antalya	+78 kg
Gold medal – first place	2025 Paris	+78 kg
Gold medal – first place	2025 Ulaanbaatar	+78 kg
Gold medal – first place	2026 Lausanne	+78 kg
Silver medal – second place	2021 Paris	+78 kg
Silver medal – second place	2021 Abu Dhabi	+78 kg
Silver medal – second place	2023 Tokyo	+78 kg
Silver medal – second place	2026 Tashkent	+78 kg
Silver medal – second place	2026 Tbilisi	+78 kg
Bronze medal – third place	2022 Abu Dhabi	+78 kg
Bronze medal – third place	2022 Tokyo	+78 kg
Bronze medal – third place	2023 Abu Dhabi	+78 kg
Bronze medal – third place	2024 Paris	+78 kg
Bronze medal – third place	2026 Paris	+78 kg
IJF Grand Prix
Silver medal – second place	2025 Qingdao	+78 kg
Silver medal – second place	2026 Qingdao	+78 kg
Bronze medal – third place	2022 Zagreb	+78 kg
Bronze medal – third place	2026 Zagreb	+78 kg
World Juniors Championships
Gold medal – first place	2021 Olbia	Mixed team
Bronze medal – third place	2019 Marrakech	Mixed team
Bronze medal – third place	2021 Olbia	+78 kg
European Junior Championships
Gold medal – first place	2019 Vantaa	+78 kg
Gold medal – first place	2020 Poreč	+78 kg
Gold medal – first place	2021 Luxembourg	+78 kg
Gold medal – first place	2021 Luxembourg	Mixed team
European Cadet Championships
Gold medal – first place	2018 Sarajevo	+70 kg

Profile at external databases
- IJF: 43574
- JudoInside.com: 111154
- Updated on 15 November 2026

Léa Fontaine (born 7 December 2000) is a French judoka. She won the silver medal in the +78 kg event at the 2021 European Judo Championships held in Lisbon, Portugal.

Fontaine won a medal at the 2021 World Judo Championships.

On 12 November 2022 Fontaine won a gold medal at the 2022 European Mixed Team Judo Championships as part of team France.
