= Helena Vuković =

Croatian judoka (born 2000)

Personal information
- Born: 23 August 2000 (age 26)
- Occupation: Judoka

Sport
- Country: Croatia
- Sport: Judo
- Weight class: +78 kg

Achievements and titles
- World Champ.: 5th (2026)
- European Champ.: 5th (2026)
Medal record
Women's judo
Representing Croatia
IJF Grand Slam
Gold medal – first place	2026 Abu Dhabi	+78 kg
Bronze medal – third place	2024 Abu Dhabi	+78 kg
Bronze medal – third place	2025 Baku	+78 kg
Bronze medal – third place	2025 Ulaanbaatar	+78 kg
IJF Grand Prix
Silver medal – second place	2025 Guadalajara	+78 kg
Silver medal – second place	2025 Gold Coast	+78 kg
Bronze medal – third place	2025 Qingdao	+78 kg
Bronze medal – third place	2025 Zagreb	+78 kg
Bronze medal – third place	2026 Qingdao	+78 kg
European Junior Championships
Bronze medal – third place	2019 Vantaa	+78 kg
World Cadets Championships
Gold medal – first place	2017 Santiago	+70 kg
European Cadet Championships
Bronze medal – third place	2016 Vantaa	+70 kg
Mediterranean Games
Gold medal – first place	2026 Taranto	+78 kg

Profile at external databases
- IJF: 19039
- JudoInside.com: 94851
- Updated on 1 November 2026

Helena Vuković (born 23 August 2000) is a Croatian judoka. She was placed 5th in the European Championship and is current world champion in the 70 kg+ category for cadets. In September 2017 she was proclaimed to be the most successful female junior athlete in Croatia for past year by Croatian Olympic Committee. She was also placed third in -78 kg category on Croatian senior championship.

Vuković won a gold medal at the 2024 European Universities Games in +78 kg event representing University of Zagreb.

She attended Lucijan Vranjanin Gymnasium in Zagreb.
