= Kazakhstan at the 2022 Asian Games =

- Flag of Kazakhstan
- IOC code: KAZ
- NOC: National Olympic Committee of the Republic of Kazakhstan
- Website: www.olympic.kz (in Kazakh)

in Hangzhou September 23 – October 8
- Competitors: 527 in 30 sports
- Flag bearers: Aslanbek Shymbergenov; Nadezhda Dubovitskaya
- Medals Ranked 11th: Gold 10 Silver 22 Bronze 48 Total 80

Asian Games appearances (overview)
- 1994; 1998; 2002; 2006; 2010; 2014; 2018; 2022; 2026

Kazakhstan competed at the 2022 Asian Games. The games were held in Zhejiang province and the meaning venue was Hangzhou.

Earlier the event was scheduled to held in September 2022 but due to COVID-19 pandemic cases rising in China the event was postponed and rescheduled to September–October 2023.

== Background ==
=== Flag bearers ===
Aslanbek Shymbergenov (boxing) and Nadezhda Dubovitskaya (athletics) were the Kazakhstani flag bearers at 2022 Asian Games opening ceremony.

=== Reward ===
Kazakh Minister of tourism and sports, Yermek Marzhikpayev, said that the gold medalists will receive a cash reward of US$10,000, while their coach will receive US$5,000. The silver medalists will be awarded US$5,000, and their coaches will receive US$3,000, whereas the bronze medalists will get US$3,000, with their coaches receiving US$2,000.

== Competitors ==
The following is the list of number of competitors in the Games.

| Sport | Men | Women | Total |
|---|---|---|---|
| Archery | 8 | 8 | 16 |
| Artistic swimming | — | 10 | 10 |
| Athletics | 7 | 12 | 19 |
| Badminton | 1 | 1 | 2 |
| Basketball | 16 | 16 | 32 |
| Beach volleyball | 4 | 4 | 8 |
| Boxing | 7 | 6 | 13 |
| Breakdancing | 2 | 1 | 3 |
| Canoeing | 13 | 12 | 25 |
| Chess | 5 | 5 | 10 |
| Cycling | 15 | 8 | 23 |
| Diving | 1 | 1 | 2 |
| Esports | 27 | 1 | 28 |
| Fencing | 8 | 8 | 16 |
| Field hockey | 0 | 17 | 17 |
| Golf | 4 | 3 | 7 |
| Gymnastics | 7 | 9 | 16 |
| Handball | 16 | 16 | 32 |
| Judo | 7 | 7 | 14 |
| Ju-jitsu | 8 | 8 | 16 |
| Karate | 4 | 4 | 8 |
| Kurash | 3 | 4 | 7 |
| Marathon swimming | 2 | 2 | 4 |
| Modern pentathlon | 4 | 4 | 8 |
| Rowing | 5 | 4 | 9 |
| Rugby sevens | 0 | 12 | 12 |
| Shooting | 18 | 15 | 33 |
| Sport climbing | 6 | 6 | 12 |
| Swimming | 2 | 4 | 6 |
| Table tennis | 4 | 4 | 8 |
| Taekwondo | 5 | 5 | 10 |
| Tennis | 4 | 4 | 8 |
| Triathlon | 3 | 2 | 5 |
| Volleyball | 12 | 12 | 24 |
| Water polo | 13 | 13 | 26 |
| Weightlifting | 7 | 7 | 14 |
| Wrestling | 12 | 6 | 18 |
| Wushu | 4 | 2 | 6 |
| Total | 264 | 263 | 527 |

== Medalists ==
The following Kazakhstan competitors won medals at the Games.

| Medal | Name | Sport | Event | Date |
|---|---|---|---|---|
| Gold | Zoya Kravchenko; Assem Orynbay; Olga Panarina | Shooting | Women's skeet team | 27 Sep |
| Gold | Assem Orynbay; Eduard Yechshenko | Shooting | Mixed skeet team | 28 Sep |
| Gold | Zukhra Irnazarova | Shooting | Women's 10 m running target | 28 Sep |
| Gold | Sergey Yemelyanov; Timur Khaidarov | Canoeing | Men's C-2 500 m | 2 Oct |
| Gold | Alexey Lutsenko | Cycling | Men's individual time trial | 3 Oct |
| Gold | Yevgeniy Fedorov | Cycling | Men's road race | 5 Oct |
| Gold | Nurkanat Azhikanov | Karate | Men's -75 kg kumite | 5 Oct |
| Gold | Nurzhan Batyrbekov | Ju-jitsu | Men's ne-waza -69 kg | 5 Oct |
| Gold | Kaisar Alpysbay | Karate | Men's -60 kg kumite | 6 Oct |
| Gold | Sofya Berultseva | Karate | Women's +68 kg kumite | 7 Oct |
| Silver | Abiba Abuzhakynova | Judo | Women's –48 kg | 24 Sep |
| Silver | Bakhtiyar Ibrayev; Andrey Khudyakov; Assadbek Nazirkulyev | Shooting | Men's 10 m running target mixed team | 26 Sep |
| Silver | Zukhra Irnazarova; Alexandra Saduakassova; Fatima Irnazarova | Shooting | Women's 10 m running target team | 28 Sep |
| Silver | Elmir Alimzhanov; Ruslan Kurbanov; Yerlik Sertay; Vadim Sharlaimov | Fencing | Men's team épée | 29 Sep |
| Silver | Bekadil Shaimerdenov | Kurash | Men's –81 kg | 1 Oct |
| Silver | Olga Shmelyova; Irina Podoinikova | Canoeing | Women's K-2 500 m | 2 Oct |
| Silver | Rufina Iskakova; Mariya Brovkova | Canoeing | Women's C-2 500 m | 2 Oct |
| Silver | Timofey Yemelyanov; Sergey Yemelyanov | Canoeing | Men's C-2 1000 m | 3 Oct |
| Silver | Margarita Torlopova; Ulyana Kiseleva | Canoeing | Women's C-2 200 m | 3 Oct |
| Silver | Danil Mussabayev | Gymnastics | Men's trampoline | 3 Oct |
| Silver | Meirzhan Shermakhanbet | Wrestling | Men's Greco-Roman -67 kg | 4 Oct |
| Silver | Alexey Lutsenko | Cycling | Men's road race | 5 Oct |
| Silver | Laura Alikul | Karate | Women's -68 kg kumite | 5 Oct |
| Silver | Karina Ibragimova | Boxing | Women's 57 kg | 5 Oct |
| Silver | Kamshybek Kunkabayev | Boxing | Men's +92 kg | 5 Oct |
| Silver | Elzhana Taniyeva; Milana Parfilova; Erika Zhailauova | Gymnastics | Women's rhythmic team | 6 Oct |
| Silver | Galina Duvanova | Ju-jitsu | Women's ne-waza -57 kg | 6 Oct |
| Silver | Zhamila Bakbergenova | Wrestling | Women's -76 kg | 6 Oct |
| Silver | Anastassiya Ananyeva | Canoeing | Women's slalom C-1 | 7 Oct |
| Silver | Elzhana Taniyeva | Gymnastics | Women's rhythmic individual all-around | 7 Oct |
| Silver | Daniyar Yuldashev | Karate | Men's 84 kg kumite | 7 Oct |
| Silver | Moldir Zhangbyrbay | Karate | Women's 50 kg kumite | 8 Oct |
| Bronze | Magzhan Shamshadin | Judo | Men's –60 kg | 24 Sep |
| Bronze | Abylaikhan Zhubanazar | Judo | Men's –81 kg | 25 Sep |
| Bronze | Esmigul Kuyulova | Judo | Women's –63 kg | 25 Sep |
| Bronze | Nikita Chiryukin | Shooting | Men's 25 m air rapid fire pistol | 25 Sep |
| Bronze | Alexandra Le; Islam Satpayev | Shooting | Mixed 10 m air rifle team | 26 Sep |
| Bronze | Nurlykhan Sharkhan | Judo | Men's –100 kg | 26 Sep |
| Bronze | Elmir Alimzhanov | Fencing | Men's individual épée | 26 Sep |
| Bronze | Assem Orynbay | Shooting | Women's skeet | 27 Sep |
| Bronze | Adilbek Mussin | Swimming | Men's 100 m butterfly | 27 Sep |
| Bronze | Ayan Tursyn | Wushu | Women's sanda 52 kg | 27 Sep |
| Bronze | Nariman Kurbanov | Gymnastics | Men's pommel horse | 28 Sep |
| Bronze | Sergey Bogatu; Dmitriy Yakovlev | Beach volleyball | Men's tournament | 28 Sep |
| Bronze | Zhanat Nabiyev; Mukhamedali Rakhmanali; Artyom Sarkissyan; Nazarbay Sattarkhan | Fencing | Men's team sabre | 28 Sep |
| Bronze | Adilbek Mussin | Swimming | Men's 50 m butterfly | 28 Sep |
| Bronze | Smaiyl Duisebay | Taekwondo | Men's +80 kg | 28 Sep |
| Bronze | Cansel Deniz | Taekwondo | Women's +67 kg | 28 Sep |
| Bronze | Ayan Beisenbayev | Triathlon | Men's individual | 29 Sep |
| Bronze | Andrey Chugay; Artyom Zakharov | Cycling | Men's madison | 29 Sep |
| Bronze | Caroline Chepkoech Kipkirui | Athletics | Women's 10,000 m | 29 Sep |
| Bronze | Mariya Dmitriyenko; Aizhan Dosmagambetova; Anastassiya Prilepina | Shooting | Women's trap team | 1 Oct |
| Bronze | Mariya Dmitriyenko | Shooting | Women's trap | 1 Oct |
| Bronze | Sagyndyk Togambay | Boxing | Men's –92 kg | 1 Oct |
| Bronze | Kazakhstan women's national water polo team: Alexandra Zharkimbayeva; Darya Pochinok; Anastassiya Glukhova; Madina Rakhmanova; Anastassiya Tsoy; Yelizaveta Rudneva; Anna Novikova; Viktoriya Kaplun; Valeriya Anossova; Milena Nabiyeva; Anastassiya Mirshina; Mariya Martynenko; Viktoriya Khritankova | Water polo | Women | 1 Oct |
| Bronze | Kirill Tubayev | Canoeing | Men's K-1 1000 m | 2 Oct |
| Bronze | Timofey Yemelyanov | Canoeing | Men's C-1 1000 m | 2 Oct |
| Bronze | Viktoriya Butolina | Gymnastics | Women's trampoline | 2 Oct |
| Bronze | Yefim Tarassov; Adelina Zems; Dmitriy Koblov; Alexandra Zalyubovskaya | Athletics | Mixed 4 × 400 m relay | 2 Oct |
| Bronze | Mariya Brovkova | Canoeing | Women's C-1 200 m | 3 Oct |
| Bronze | Rinata Sultanova | Cycling | Women's individual time trial | 3 Oct |
| Bronze | Aslanbek Shymbergenov | Boxing | Men's –71 kg | 3 Oct |
| Bronze | Nadezhda Dubovitskaya | Athletics | Women's high jump | 3 Oct |
| Bronze | Caroline Chepkoech Kipkirui | Athletics | Women's 5,000 m | 3 Oct |
| Bronze | Azat Sadykov | Wrestling | Men's Greco-Roman -77 kg | 4 Oct |
| Bronze | Natalya Bogdanova | Boxing | Women's 66 kg | 4 Oct |
| Bronze | Alexandr Uvarov | Weightlifting | Men's -81 kg | 4 Oct |
| Bronze | Alimkhan Syzdykov | Wrestling | Men's Greco-Roman -130 kg | 5 Oct |
| Bronze | Mansur Khabibulla | Ju-jitsu | Men's ne-waza -62 kg | 5 Oct |
| Bronze | Aldiyar Serik | Ju-jitsu | Men's ne-waza -69 kg | 5 Oct |
| Bronze | Assel Kanay | Karate | Women's -61 kg kumite | 6 Oct |
| Bronze | Milana Parfilova | Gymnastics | Women's rhythmic individual all-around | 7 Oct |
| Bronze | Kazakhstan women's team: Zhansaya Abdumalik; Bibisara Assaubayeva; Meruert Kamalidenova; Alua Nurmanova; Dinara Saduakassova | Chess | Women's team | 7 Oct |
| Bronze | Arina Pushkina; Yasmin Tuyakova | Artistic swimming | Duet | 7 Oct |
| Bronze | Kazakhstan women's team: Nargiza Bolatova; Eteri Kakutia; Aigerim Kurmangaliyeva; Xeniya Makarova; Arina Myasnikova; Anna Pavletsova; Arina Pushkina; Yasmin Tuyakova; Zhaklin Yakimova; Zhaniya Zhiyenhazy | Artistic swimming | Team | 8 Oct |

Medals by sport
| Sport | 1st place, gold medalist(s) | 2nd place, silver medalist(s) | 3rd place, bronze medalist(s) | Total |
| Artistic swimming | 0 | 0 | 2 | 2 |
| Athletics | 0 | 0 | 4 | 4 |
| Beach volleyball | 0 | 0 | 1 | 1 |
| Boxing | 0 | 2 | 3 | 5 |
| Canoeing | 1 | 5 | 5 | 11 |
| Chess | 0 | 0 | 1 | 1 |
| Cycling | 2 | 1 | 2 | 5 |
| Fencing | 0 | 1 | 2 | 3 |
| Gymnastics | 0 | 3 | 3 | 6 |
| Judo | 0 | 1 | 4 | 5 |
| Ju-jitsu | 1 | 1 | 3 | 5 |
| Karate | 3 | 3 | 2 | 8 |
| Kurash | 0 | 1 | 0 | 1 |
| Shooting | 3 | 2 | 5 | 10 |
| Swimming | 0 | 0 | 2 | 2 |
| Taekwondo | 0 | 0 | 2 | 2 |
| Triathlon | 0 | 0 | 1 | 1 |
| Water polo | 0 | 0 | 2 | 2 |
| Wushu | 0 | 0 | 1 | 1 |
| Weightlifting | 0 | 0 | 1 | 1 |
| Wrestling | 0 | 2 | 2 | 4 |

Medals by day
| Day | Date | 1st place, gold medalist(s) | 2nd place, silver medalist(s) | 3rd place, bronze medalist(s) | Total |
| 1 | 24 Sep | 0 | 1 | 1 | 2 |
| 2 | 25 Sep | 0 | 0 | 3 | 3 |
| 3 | 26 Sep | 0 | 1 | 3 | 4 |
| 4 | 27 Sep | 1 | 0 | 3 | 4 |
| 5 | 28 Sep | 2 | 1 | 6 | 9 |
| 6 | 29 Sep | 0 | 1 | 3 | 4 |
| 7 | 30 Sep | 0 | 0 | 0 | 0 |
| 8 | 1 Oct | 0 | 1 | 4 | 4 |
| 9 | 2 Oct | 1 | 2 | 4 | 7 |
| 10 | 3 Oct | 1 | 3 | 5 | 9 |

== Boxing ==
Men

| Athlete | Event | Round of 32 | Round of 16 | Quarterfinals | Semifinals | Final | Rank |
| Athlete | Event | Opposition Result | Opposition Result | Opposition Result | Opposition Result | Opposition Result | Rank |
|---|---|---|---|---|---|---|---|
| Saken Bibossinov | –51 kg | Önöbold (MGL); W 5–0 | Dusmatov (UZB); L 1–4 | Did not advance | | | |
| Makhmud Sabyrkhan | –57 kg | Lee (KOR); W 5–0 | Tae-bom (PRK); L 2–3 | Did not advance | | | |
| Yertugan Zeinullinov | –63.5 kg | Al-Kasbeh (JOR); W 5–0 | Usmonov (TJK); W 3–2 | Chinzorig (MGL); L 0–5 | Did not advance | | |
| Aslanbek Shymbergenov | –71 kg | Bye | Wang (CHN); W 4–0 | Muydinkhujaev (UZB); W RSC | Okazawa (JPN); L 2–3 | Did not advance | 3rd place, bronze medalist(s) |
| Nurbek Oralbay | –80 kg | bye | Tanglatihan (CHN); L 2–3 | Did not advance | | | |
| Sagyndyk Togambay | –92kg | Bye | Bariakhaan (MGL)W RSC | Sharifi (IRI); W KO | Han (CHN); L 0–5 | Did not advance | 3rd place, bronze medalist(s) |
| Kamshybek Kunkabayev | +92 kg | —N/a | Bye | Latypov (BHR); W 5–0 | Berwal (IND); W 5–0 | Jalolov (UZB); L 0–4 | 2nd place, silver medalist(s) |

Women

| Athlete | Event | Round of 32 | Round of 16 | Quarterfinals | Semifinals | Final | Rank |
| Athlete | Event | Opposition Result | Opposition Result | Opposition Result | Opposition Result | Opposition Result | Rank |
|---|---|---|---|---|---|---|---|
| Nazym Kyzaibay | 51 kg | Bye | Tamang (NEP); W 5–0 | Yesügen (MGL); L 0–4 | Did not advance | | |
| Zhaina Shekerbekova | 54 kg | —N/a | Bye | Preeti (IND); L 1–4 | Did not advance | | |
| Karina Ibragimova | 57 kg | —N/a | Paek (PRK); W 5–0 | Namuun (MGL); W 5–0 | Samadova (TJK); W 3–2 | Lin (TPE); L 0–5 | 2nd place, silver medalist(s) |
| Rimma Volossenko | 60 kg | —N/a | Wu (TPE); L 1–4 | Did not advance | | | |
| Natalya Bogdanova | 66 kg | —N/a | Al-Naimi (KSA); W 5-0 RSC | Tsetsegdari (MGL); W 5–0 | Suwannapheng (THA); L RSC | Did not advance | 3rd place, bronze medalist(s) |
| Valentina Khalzova | 75 kg | —N/a | Bye | Li (CHN); L 0–5 | Did not advance | | |

== Canoeing ==
=== Slalom ===
| Athlete | Event | Heats (1st run) | | Heats (2nd run) | | Semifinal | | Final | |
| Athlete | Event | Best | Rank | Time | Rank | Time | Rank | | |
|---|---|---|---|---|---|---|---|---|---|
| Alexandr Kulikov | Men's C-1 | 95.85 | 2 Q | Bye | | 102.79 | 5 Q | 101.04 | 3rd place, bronze medalist(s) |
| Kuanysh Yerengaipov | Men's C-1 | 97.14 | 4 Q | Bye | | 107.68 | 7 | Did not advance | |
| Imangali Mambetov | Men's K-1 | 99.12 | 5 Q | Bye | | 114.02 | 9 | Did not advance | |
| Alexandr Korobov | Men's K-1 | 99.61 | 6 Q | Bye | | 111.96 | 7 Q | 105.41 | 5 |
| Anastassiya Ananyeva | Women's C-1 | 116.92 | 4 | 110.34 | 1 Q | 115.32 | 2 Q | 119.29 | 2nd place, silver medalist(s) |
| Yekaterina Tarantseva | Women's K-1 | 109.31 | 4 Q | Bye | | 116.76 | 3 Q | 115.71 | 3rd place, bronze medalist(s) |

=== Sprint ===
| Athlete | Event | Heats | | Semifinal | | Final | |
| Athlete | Event | Time | Rank | Time | Rank | Time | Rank |
|---|---|---|---|---|---|---|---|
| Timofey Yemelyanov | Men's C-1 1000 m | 4:10.107 | 2 QS | 4:32.132 | 2 QF | 4:18.810 | 3rd place, bronze medalist(s) |
| Sergey Yemelyanov; Timur Khaidarov | Men's C-2 500 m | 1:48.595 | 1 QF | Bye | | 1:49.010 | 1st place, gold medalist(s) |
| Sergey Yemelyanov; Timofey Yemelyanov | Men's C-2 1000 m | —N/a | | | | 3:49.991 | 2nd place, silver medalist(s) |
| Kirill Tubayev | Men's K-1 1000 m | 3:51.925 | 2 QF | Bye | | 3:51.399 | 3rd place, bronze medalist(s) |
| Igor Ryashentsev; Andrey Yerguchyov | Men's K-2 500 m | 1:38.338 | 2 QF | Bye | | 1:39.877 | 4 |
| Bekarys Ramatulla; Andrey Yerguchyov; Sergii Tokarnytskyi; Igor Ryashentsev | Men's K-4 500 m | 1:28.922 | 3 QF | Bye | | 1:28.400 | 6 |
| Mariya Brovkova | Women's C-1 200 m | 52.530 | 1 QF | Bye | | 49.368 | 3rd place, bronze medalist(s) |
| Margarita Torlopova; Ulyana Kisseleva | Women's C-2 200 m | —N/a | | | | 46.627 | 2nd place, silver medalist(s) |
| Mariya Brovkova; Rufina Iskakova | Women's C-2 500 m | —N/a | | | | 2:08.125 | 2nd place, silver medalist(s) |
| Anastassiya Berezovskaya | Women's K-1 500 m | 2:06.783 | 2 QF | Bye | | 2:05.968 | 6 |
| Olga Shmelyova; Irina Podoinikova | Women's K-2 500 m | 1:49.240 | 1 QF | Bye | | 1:51.251 | 2nd place, silver medalist(s) |
| Olga Shmelyova; Tatyana Tokarnitskaya; Darya Petrova; Stella Sukhanova | Women's K-4 500 m | —N/a | | | | 1:43.994 | 4 |

Qualification legend: QF=Final; QS=Semifinal

== Fencing ==
Individual

| Athlete | Event | Preliminary | | Round of 32 | Round of 16 | Quarterfinals | Semifinals | Final | |
| Athlete | Event | Result | Rank | Opposition Score | Opposition Score | Opposition Score | Opposition Score | Opposition Score | Rank |
|---|---|---|---|---|---|---|---|---|---|
| Elmir Alimzhanov | Men's épée | 5W 0L | 1 Q | Bye | Nurmatov (UZB); W 13–8 | Yu (CHN); W 15–12 | Kano (JPN); L 9–15 | Did not advance | 3rd place, bronze medalist(s) |
| Ruslan Kurbanov | Men's épée | 6W 0L | 1 Q | Bye | Komata (JPN); L 15–9 | Did not advance | | | 9 |
| Artyom Sarkissyan | Men's sabre | 3W 2L | 3 Q | Bye | Low (HKG); W 15–13 | Al-Shamlan (KUW); L 10–15 | Did not advance | | 8 |
| Nazarbay Sattarkhan | Men's sabre | 2W 3L | 4 Q | Vu (VIE); W 15–5 | Gu (KOR); L 6–15 | Did not advance | | | 14 |
| Karina Dospay | Women's sabre | 4W 1L | 2 Q | Bye | Sarybay (KAZ); W 15–14 | Ozaki (JPN); L 13–15 | Did not advance | | 7 |
| Aigerim Sarybay | Women's sabre | 2W 2L | 3 Q | Bye | Dospay (KAZ); L 14–15 | Did not advance | | | 14 |

Team

| Athlete | Event | Round of 16 | Quarterfinals | Semifinals | Final | |
| Athlete | Event | Opposition Score | Opposition Score | Opposition Score | Opposition Score | Rank |
|---|---|---|---|---|---|---|
| Elmir Alimzhanov; Ruslan Kurbanov; Vadim Sharlaimov; Yerlik Sertay | Men's épée | Mongolia (MGL); W 45–12 | Vietnam (VIE); W 45–26 | Hong Kong (HKG); W 45–30 | Japan (JPN); L 35–36 | 2nd place, silver medalist(s) |
| Zhanat Nabiyev; Mukhamedali Rakhmanali; Artyom Sarkissyan; Nazarbay Sattarkhan | Men's sabre | Nepal (NEP); W 45–15 | Kuwait (KUW); W 45–43 | South Korea (KOR); L 41–45 | Did not advance | 3rd place, bronze medalist(s) |
| Sofiya Nikolaichuk; Vladislava Andreyeva; Ulyana Pistsova; Alexandra Tambovtseva | Women's épée | Bye | China (CHN); L 39–45 | Did not advance | | 6 |
| Karina Dospay; Aigerim Sarybay; Anastassiya Gulik | Women's sabre | Bye | Japan (JPN); L 20–45 | Did not advance | | 6 |

== Judo ==
Kazakhstan sent their judo practitioners to compete at the Games.

Key:

- 1st number — Ippon
- 2nd number — Waza-ari
- s — Shido

Men

| Athlete | Event | Round of 32 | Round of 16 | Quarter-finals | Semi-finals | Repechage | Final / BM | Rank |
| Athlete | Event | Opposition Result | Opposition Result | Opposition Result | Opposition Result | Opposition Result | Opposition Result | Rank |
|---|---|---|---|---|---|---|---|---|
| Magzhan Shamshadin | –60 kg | Bye | Divband (AFG); W 10–00s3 | Chae (PRK); W 01s2–00s2 | Lee (KOR); L 00s2–10s2 | Bye | Sufiev (TJK); W 01–00s2 | 3rd place, bronze medalist(s) |
| Gusman Kyrgyzbayev | –66 kg | Bye | Haddad (LBN); W 10–00 | Nurillaev (UZB); L 00s3–10s1 | Did not advance | Dzhebov (TJK); L 00s1–10s1 | Did not advance | |
| Daniyar Shamshayev | –73 kg | Bye | Mak (HKG); W 10–00s2 | Khojazoda (TJK); L 00s2–01 | Did not advance | Sagynaliev (KGZ); W 1021–00 | Tsend-Ochir (MGL); L 00s1–10 | 5 |
| Abylaikhan Zhubanazar | –81 kg | Bye | Lee (HKG); W 10–00 | Gerbekov (BRN); W 10–00s1 | Makhmadbekov (TJK); L 00–01s1 | Bye | Sobirov (UZB); W 11s2–01s2 | 3rd place, bronze medalist(s) |
| Didar Khamza | –90 kg | Bye | Baghcheghi (IRI); W 10s2–00s2 | Gantulga (MGL); L 0s3-10s2 | Did not advance | | | |
| Nurlykhan Sharkhan | –100 kg | Bye | Bashaev (BRN); W 10-00s3 | Aaron Phillip (JPN); W 10s1-0s3 | Muzaffarbek Turoboyev (UZB); L 0–11 | —N/a | Won Jong-hoon (KOR); W 10-0s1 | 3rd place, bronze medalist(s) |
| Galymzhan Krikbay | +100 kg | —N/a | Gole (NEP); W 10s1-0s1 | Alisher Yusupov (UZB); L 0–10 | Did not advance | Tsetsentsengel (MGL); W10s2-0s2 | Kim Minjong (KOR); L 0s2-1s2 | 5 |

Women

| Athlete | Event | Round of 16 | Quarter-finals | Semi-finals | Repechage | Final / BM | Rank |
| Athlete | Event | Opposition Result | Opposition Result | Opposition Result | Opposition Result | Opposition Result | Rank |
|---|---|---|---|---|---|---|---|
| Abiba Abuzhakynova | –48 kg | Lopez (PHI); W 01s1–00s1 | Jon (PRK); W 01s2–00s2 | Lee (KOR); W 10s1–00s3 | —N/a | Tsunoda (JPN); L 00–11s1 | 2nd place, silver medalist(s) |
| Galiya Tynbayeva | –52 kg | Zhu (CHN); W 01s2–00s2 | Lkhagvasüren (MGL); L 00–01 | Did not advance | Muminova (TJK); W 10–00s3 | Jung (KOR); L 00s2–01 | 5 |
| Sevara Nishanbayeva | –57 kg | Gulboeva (TJK); W 10s1–00s1 | Lien (TPE); L 00–10 | Did not advance | Batsukh (UAE); L 00s2–10s1 | Did not advance | |
| Esmigul Kuyulova | –63 kg | Munkhtsedev (MGL); W 10–00 | Kim (KOR); L 00–01 | Did not advance | Watanabe (PHI); W 10–00 | Isokova (UZB); W 10s1–01s2 | 3rd place, bronze medalist(s) |
| Anastassiya Mayakova | –70 kg | Barbat (IRI); L 01–10s2 | Did not advance | | | | |
| Aruna Jangeldina | –78 kg | Alyas (YEM); W 10–00 | Kurbanbaeva (UZB); L 0s2-1s2 | Did not advance | Oeda (THA); W 10-0s1 | Yoon (KOR); L 0s1-10s1 | 5 |
| Kamila Berlikash | +78 kg | Bye | Amarsaikhany (MGL); L 0s2-1s2 | Did not advance | Ilmatova (UZB); W 10-0s1 | Tomita (JPN); L 0–10 | 5 |

== Karate ==
=== Kumite ===
Men

| Athlete | Event | Round of 32 | Round of 16 | Quarterfinals / R1 | Semifinals / R2 | Final / BM | |
| Athlete | Event | Opposition score | Opposition score | Opposition score | Opposition score | Opposition score | Rank |
|---|---|---|---|---|---|---|---|
| Kaisar Alpysbay | -60 kg | Chau (HKG) W 5–4 | Sankar (MAL) W 5–3 | Muekthong (THA) W 8–0 | Saputra (INA) W 12–3 | Shabaan (KUW) W 7–5 | 1st place, gold medalist(s) |
| Didar Amirali | -67 kg | Chrun (CAM) W 8–0 | Cheng (HKG) W 10–3 | Selvam (MAL) W 8–0 | Al-Masatfa (JOR) L 2–10 | Mehdizadeh (IRI) W 7–2 | 3rd place, bronze medalist(s) |
| Nurkanat Azhikanov | -75 kg | Bye | Alam (NEP) W 5–0 | Nurlanov (KGZ) W 3–1 | Raghonathan (MAL) W 4–3 | Masarweh (JOR) W 8–0 | 1st place, gold medalist(s) |
| Daniyar Yuldashev | -84 kg | —N/a | Kanabkaew (THA) W 6–2 | Wu (TPE) W 7–4 | Al-Jafari (JOR) W DSQ | Muhammad Arif Afifuddin (MAS) L 4–10 | 2nd place, silver medalist(s) |

Women

| Athlete | Event | Round of 32 | Round of 16 | Quarterfinals | Semifinals | Final / BM | |
| Athlete | Event | Opposition score | Opposition score | Opposition score | Opposition score | Opposition score | Rank |
|---|---|---|---|---|---|---|---|
| Moldir Zhangbyrbay | -50 kg | Bye | Tsang (HKG) W 3–2 | Miyahara (JPN) W 6–5 | Bahmanyar (IRI) W 5–4 | Gu (TPE) L 5-5 | 2nd place, silver medalist(s) |
| Asel Kanay | -61 kg | —N/a | Zakiah (MAL) W 6–0 | Lim (PHI) W 1–0 | Nguyễn (VIE) L 5–7 | Golshadnezhad (IRI) W 1–0 | 3rd place, bronze medalist(s) |
| Laura Alikul | -68 kg | —N/a | Bye | Đinh (VIE) W 7–4 | Zefanya (INA) W 5–1 | Li (CHN) L 0–4 | 2nd place, silver medalist(s) |
| Sofya Berultseva | +68 kg | —N/a | Bye | Al-Drous (JOR) W 3–0 | Brito (PHI) W 1–0 | Gurung (NEP) W 3–0 | 1st place, gold medalist(s) |

== Kurash ==
Men

| Athlete | Event | Round of 16 | Quarter-finals | Semi-finals | Final | |
| Athlete | Event | Opposition Score | Opposition Score | Opposition Score | Opposition Score | Rank |
|---|---|---|---|---|---|---|
| Nur Amanshukirov | –66 kg | Withdrew | | | | |
| Bekadil Shaimerdenov | –81 kg | Karimzod (TJK); W 10–0 | Kaunsatan (THA); W 10–0 | Huang (TPE); W 10–0 | Esanov (UZB); L 0–10 | 2nd place, silver medalist(s) |
| Nurdaulet Zharylgapov | +90 kg | Tejenov (TKM); L 3−3 | Did not advance | | | |

Women

| Athlete | Event | Round of 32 | Round of 16 | Quarter-finals | Semi-finals | Final | |
| Athlete | Event | Opposition Score | Opposition Score | Opposition Score | Opposition Score | Opposition Score | Rank |
|---|---|---|---|---|---|---|---|
| Tolganay Abeuova | –52 kg | Bye | Ochirpurev (MGL); W 3–0 | Ortikboeva (UZB); L 0–10 | Did not advance | | |
| Aruzhan Adaskhan | –52 kg | Bye | Elmurodova (UZB); L 0–5 | Did not advance | | | |
| Albina Bakhiyeva | –87 kg | —N/a | Yang (TPE); W 5–0 | Liu (CHN); L 0–5 | Did not advance | | |
| Moldir Nurlanbek | –87 kg | —N/a | Muhammedova (TKM); L 0–5 | Did not advance | | | |

== Modern pentathlon ==
Individual

| Athlete | Event | Swimming (200 m freestyle) | | Fencing (épée one touch) | | Riding (show jumping) | | Laser-run (shooting 10 m air pistol/ running 3200 m) | | Total points | Final rank |
| Athlete | Event | Rank | MP points | Rank | MP points | Rank | MP points | Rank | MP points | Total points | Final rank |
|---|---|---|---|---|---|---|---|---|---|---|---|
| Pavel Ilyashenko | Men's | 12 | 295 | 2 | 250 | 15 | 0 (EL) | 10 | 638 | 1183 | 16 |
| Kirill Stadnik | Men's | 16 | 281 | 4 | 242 | 12 | 269 | 17 | 547 | 1339 | 13 |
| Georgiy Boroda-Dudochkin | Men's | 10 | 298 | 15 | 203 | 8 | 290 | 13 | 620 | 1411 | 10 |
| Temirlan Abdraimov | Men's | 15 | 283 | 11 | 222 | 15 | 0 (EL) | 8 | 642 | 1147 | 17 |
| Anastassiya Kochetkova | Women's | 8 | 277 | 4 | 242 | 11 | 0 (EL) | 18 | 414 | 933 | 16 |
| Yelena Potapenko | Women's | 12 | 274 | 12 | 217 | 1 | 300 | 7 | 549 | 1340 | 5 |
| Lyudmila Yakovleva | Women's | 15 | 267 | 13 | 204 | 10 | 269 | 14 | 495 | 1235 | 10 |
| Kristina Ryabova | Women's | 18 | 236 | 18 | 165 | 11 | 0 (EL) | 16 | 445 | 846 | 18 |

Team

| Athletes | Event | Points | Total points | Rank |
|---|---|---|---|---|
| Georgiy Boroda-Dudochkin; Kirill Stadnik; Pavel Ilyashenko | Men's team | 1411; 1339; 1183 | 3933 | 4 |
| Yelena Potapenko; Lyudmila Yakovleva; Anastassiya Kochetkova | Women's team | 1340; 1235; 933 | 3508 | 4 |

== Shooting ==
=== Men ===
Individual

| Athlete | Event | Qualification | | Final | |
| Athlete | Event | Points | Rank | Points | Rank |
|---|---|---|---|---|---|
| Eldar Imankulov | 10 m air pistol | 575 | 20 | Did not advance | |
| Maxim Mazepa | 10 m air pistol | 574 | 24 | Did not advance | |
| Valeriy Rakhimzhan | 10 m air pistol | 571 | 29 | Did not advance | |
| Nikita Chiryukin | 25 m rapid fire pistol | 581 | 7 Q | 26 | 3rd place, bronze medalist(s) |
| Artemiy Kabakov | 25 m rapid fire pistol | 556 | 26 | Did not advance | |
| Ruslan Yunusmetov | 25 m rapid fire pistol | 555 | 27 | Did not advance | |
| Islam Satpayev | 10 m air rifle | 629.6 | 9 Q | 165.9 | 6 |
| Konstantin Malinovskiy | 10 m air rifle | 625.9 | 19 | Did not advance | |
| Yuriy Yurkov | 10 m air rifle | 616.3 | 46 | Did not advance | |
| Konstantin Malinovskiy | 50 m rifle three positions | 584 | 10 Q | 428.7 | 5 |
| Yuriy Yurkov | 50 m rifle three positions | 581 | 14 | Did not advance | |
| Islam Satpayev | 50 m rifle three positions | 580 | 16 | Did not advance | |
| Bakhtiyar Ibrayev | 10 m running target | —N/a | | 549 | 11 |
| Andrey Khudyakov | 10 m running target | —N/a | | 561 | 6 |
| Assadbek Nazirkulyev | 10 m running target | —N/a | | 554 | 9 |
| Bakhtiyar Ibrayev | 10 m running target mixed | —N/a | | 371 | 8 |
| Assadbek Nazirkulyev | 10 m running target mixed | —N/a | | 374 | 4 |
| Andrey Khudyakov | 10 m running target mixed | —N/a | | 366 | 12 |
| Alisher Aisalbayev | Trap | 119 | 7 | Did not advance | |
| Maksim Bedarev | Trap | 116 | 21 | Did not advance | |
| Daniil Pochivalov | Trap | 116 | 19 | Did not advance | |
| Eduard Yechshenko | Skeet | 118 | 11 | Did not advance | |
| Alexandr Yechshenko | Skeet | 119 | 8 | Did not advance | |
| David Pochivalov | Skeet | 118 | 9 | Did not advance | |

Team

| Athlete | Event | Final | |
| Athlete | Event | Score | Rank |
|---|---|---|---|
| Konstantin Malinovskiy; Islam Satpayev; Yuriy Yurkov | 10 m air rifle team | 1871.8 | 8 |
| Konstantin Malinovskiy; Islam Satpayev; Yuriy Yurkov | 50 m rifle three positions team | 1745 | 4 |
| Eldar Imankulov; Maxim Mazepa; Valeriy Rakhimzhan | 10 m air pistol team | 1720 | 7 |
| Nikita Chiryukin; Ruslan Yunusmetov; Artemiy Kabakov | 25 m rapid fire pistol team | 1692 | 8 |
| Alisher Aisalbayev; Maksim Bedarev; Daniil Pochivalov | Trap team | 351 | 5 |
| Eduard Yechshenko; Alexandr Yechshenko; David Pochivalov | Skeet team | 355 | 4 |
| Bakhtiyar Ibrayev; Andrey Khudyakov; Assadbek Nazirkulyev | 10 m running target team | 1664 | 5 |
| Bakhtiyar Ibrayev; Andrey Khudyakov; Assadbek Nazirkulyev | 10 m running target mixed team | 1111 | 2nd place, silver medalist(s) |

=== Women ===
Individual

| Athlete | Event | Qualification | | Final | |
| Athlete | Event | Points | Rank | Points | Rank |
|---|---|---|---|---|---|
| Irina Yunusmetova | 10 m air pistol | 573 | 16 | Did not advance | |
| Olga Axenova | 10 m air pistol | 565 | 37 | Did not advance | |
| Saule Alimbek | 10 m air pistol | 549 | 50 | Did not advance | |
| Irina Yunusmetova | 25 m pistol | 555 | 37 | Did not advance | |
| Olga Axenova | 25 m pistol | 567 | 29 | Did not advance | |
| Saule Alimbek | 25 m pistol | 557 | 36 | Did not advance | |
| Yelizaveta Bezrukova | 10 m air rifle | 628.0 | 12 | Did not advance | |
| Alexandra Le | 10 m air rifle | 626.1 | 19 | Did not advance | |
| Yelizaveta Bezrukova | 50 m rifle three positions | 585 | 10 | Did not advance | |
| Alexandra Le | 50 m rifle three positions | 582 | 14 | Did not advance | |
| Arina Altukhova | 50 m rifle three positions | 583 | 13 | Did not advance | |
| Mariya Dmitriyenko | Trap | 115 | 4 Q | 34 | 3rd place, bronze medalist(s) |
| Aizhan Dosmagambetova | Trap | 114 | 7 Q | 27 | 4 |
| Anastassiya Prilepina | Trap | 107 | 15 | Did not advance | |
| Assem Orynbay | Skeet | 119 | 2 Q | 45 | 3rd place, bronze medalist(s) |
| Olga Panarina | Skeet | 117 | 4 Q | 34 | 4 |
| Zoya Kravchenko | Skeet | 114 | 9 | Did not advance | |
| Zukhra Irnazarova | 10 m running target | —N/a | | 560 | 1st place, gold medalist(s) |
| Fatima Irnazarova | 10 m running target | —N/a | | 541 | 6 |
| Alexandra Saduakassova | 10 m running target | —N/a | | 541 | 7 |

Team

| Athlete | Event | Final | |
| Athlete | Event | Score | Rank |
|---|---|---|---|
| Yelizaveta Bezrukova; Alexandra Le; Arina Altukhova | 50 m rifle three positions team | 1750 | 4 |
| Irina Yunusmetova; Olga Axenova; Saule Alimbek | 10 m air pistol team | 1687 | 12 |
| Irina Yunusmetova; Olga Axenova; Saule Alimbek | 25 m pistol team | 1679 | 11 |
| Mariya Dmitriyenko; Aizhan Dosmagambetova; Anastassiya Prilepina | Trap team | 336 | 3rd place, bronze medalist(s) |
| Assem Orynbay; Olga Panarina; Zoya Kravchenko | Skeet team | 350 | 1st place, gold medalist(s) |
| Zukhra Irnazarova; Fatima Irnazarova; Alexandra Saduakassova | 10 m running target team | 1642 | 2nd place, silver medalist(s) |

=== Mixed team ===
| Athlete | Event | Qualification | | Final | |
| Athlete | Event | Points | Rank | Points | Rank |
|---|---|---|---|---|---|
| Valeriy Rakhimzhan; Irina Yunusmetova | 10 m air pistol | 567 | 12 | Did not advance | |
| Islam Satpayev; Alexandra Le | 10 m air rifle | 629.3 QB | 4 | 17 | 3rd place, bronze medalist(s) |
| Eduard Yechshenko; Assem Orynbay | Skeet | 148 QG | 2 | 40 | 1st place, gold medalist(s) |

== Sport climbing ==
Speed

| Athlete | Event | Qualification | | Round of 16 | Quarter-finals | Semi-finals | Final / BM | |
| Athlete | Event | Best | Rank | Opposition Time | Opposition Time | Opposition Time | Opposition Time | Rank |
|---|---|---|---|---|---|---|---|---|
| Rishat Khaibullin | Men's | 5.454 | 9 Q | Maimuratov (KAZ); L 5.622–5.176 | Did not advance | | | |
| Amir Maimuratov | Men's | 5.447 | 8 Q | Khaibullin (KAZ); W 5.176–5.622 | Leonardo (INA); L Fall–5.110 | Did not advance | | |
| Assel Marlenova | Women's | 8.536 | 9 Q | Noh (KOR); L 8.508–8.017 | Did not advance | | | |
| Tamara Ulzhabaeva | Women's | 7.497 | 5 Q | Disyabut (THA); L 8.825–8.314 | Did not advance | | | |

Speed relay

| Athlete | Event | Qualification | | Quarter-finals | Semi-finals | Final / BM | |
| Athlete | Event | Time | Rank | Opposition Time | Opposition Time | Opposition Time | Rank |
|---|---|---|---|---|---|---|---|
| Beknur Altynbekov; Rishat Khaibullin; Amir Maimuratov; Alisher Murat | Men's | 18.553 | 4 Q | South Korea (KOR); L 18.691–18.025 | Did not advance | | |
| Assel Marlenova; Tanzila Ospan; Tamara Ulzhabayeva; Adeliya Utesheva | Women's | 29.325 | 4 Q | —N/a | China (CHN); L 32.417–23.318 | South Korea (KOR); L 27.998–26.901 | 4 |

Combined

| Athlete | Event | Qualification | | | | Semi-finals | | | | Final | | | |
| Athlete | Event | Boulder Point | Lead Point | Total | Rank | Boulder Point | Lead Point | Total | Rank | Boulder Point | Lead Point | Total | Rank |
|---|---|---|---|---|---|---|---|---|---|---|---|---|---|
| Artyom Devyaterikov | Men's | 43.2 | 28.1 | 71.3 | 16 Q | 24.4 | 16 | 40.4 | 16 | Did not advance | | | |
| Alexey Panfilov | Men's | 49 | 30 | 79.0 | 15 Q | 14.4 | 28 | 42.4 | 15 | Did not advance | | | |
| Viktoriya Adamenko | Women's | 44.5 | 7.1 | 51.6 | 16 Q | 12.40 | 2.1 | 14.5 | 17 | Cancelled (Note: The women's boulder and lead final has been cancelled due to rain and safety of the athletes. The semi-finals result would be used as final result.) | | | |
| Margarita Agambayeva | Women's | 64.9 | 28.1 | 93.0 | 8 Q | 52.93 | 28 | 80.93 | 8 | Cancelled | | | |

== Table tennis ==
Individual

| Athlete | Event | Round of 64 | Round of 32 | Round of 16 | Quarterfinals | Semifinals | Final | |
| Athlete | Event | Opposition score | Opposition score | Opposition score | Opposition score | Opposition score | Opposition score | Rank |
|---|---|---|---|---|---|---|---|---|
| Alan Kurmangaliyev | Men's singles | Bye | Harimoto (JPN); L 1–4 | Did not advance | | | | |
| Kirill Gerassimenko | Men's singles | Bye | Dinh Anh (VIE); W 4–0 | Lim (KOR); W 1–4 | Did not advance | | | |
| Sarvinoz Mirkadirova | Women's singles | Bye | Zhou (SGP); L 1–4 | Did not advance | | | | |
| Anastassiya Lavrova | Women's singles | Pyon (PRK); L 0–4 | Did not advance | | | | | |
| Alan Kurmangaliyev; Sarvinoz Mirkadirova | Mixed doubles | Bye | Jang / Jeon (KOR); L 0–3 | Did not advance | | | | |
| Aidos Kenzhigulov; Zauresh Akasheva | Mixed doubles | Bye | Ri / Pyon (PRK); L 0–3 | Did not advance | | | | |

Doubles

| Athlete | Event | Round of 64 | Round of 32 | Round of 16 | Quarterfinals | Semifinals | Final | |
| Athlete | Event | Opposition score | Opposition score | Opposition score | Opposition score | Opposition score | Opposition score | Rank |
|---|---|---|---|---|---|---|---|---|
| Alan Kurmangaliyev; Kirill Gerassimenko | Men's doubles | Bye | Jang / Lim (KOR); L 0–3 | Did not advance | | | | |
| Aidos Kenzhigulov; Vladislav Zakharov | Men's doubles | Bye | Fan/ Wang (CHN); L 0–3 | Did not advance | | | | |
| Sarvinoz Mirkadirova; Angelina Romanovskaya | Women's doubles | —N/a | Khoury/ Sahakian (LBN); W 3–0 | Chen/ Huang (TPE); L 1–3 | Did not advance | | | |
| Zauresh Akasheva; Anastassiya Lavrova | Women's doubles | —N/a | Mukherjee S/ Mukherjee A (IND); L 0–3 | Did not advance | | | | |

Team

| Athlete | Event | Group stage | | | Round of 16 | Quarterfinal | Semifinal | Final | |
| Athlete | Event | Opposition Score | Opposition Score | Rank | Opposition Score | Opposition Score | Opposition Score | Opposition Score | Rank |
|---|---|---|---|---|---|---|---|---|---|
| Alan Kurmangaliyev; Kirill Gerassimenko; Vladislav Zakharov | Men's | Chinese Taipei (TPE); L 1–3 | Maldives (MDV); W 3–0 | 2 Q | India (IND); L 2–3 | Did not advance | | | |
| Sarvinoz Mirkadirova; Zauresh Akasheva; Angelina Romanovskaya | Women's | China (CHN); L 0–3 | Macau (MAC); W 3–0 | 2 Q | Hong Kong (HKG); L 0–3 | Did not advance | | | |

== Taekwondo ==
Kyorugi

| Athlete | Event | Round of 32 | Round of 16 | Quarter-final | Semi-final | Final | |
| Athlete | Event | Opposition Score | Opposition Score | Opposition Score | Opposition Score | Opposition Score | Rank |
|---|---|---|---|---|---|---|---|
| Yeldos Yskak | Men's −58 kg | do Rego Cruz Lein (TLS); W 2–0 | Koudsi (LBN); W 2–0 | Rezaee (AFG); L 0–2 | Did not advance | | |
| Nurbek Gazez | Men's −63 kg | Bye | Chua (PHI); W 2–0 | Liang (CHN); L 0–2 | Did not advance | | |
| Eldar Birimbay | Men's −68 kg | Bye | Tsagaantsooj (MGL); W 2–1 | Jin (KOR); L 0–2 | Did not advance | | |
| Nurlan Myrzabayev | Men's −80 kg | Bye | Al Rammahi (IRQ); L 1–2 | Did not advance | | | |
| Smaiyl Duisebay | Men's +80 kg | —N/a | Wangdi (BHU); W 2–0 | Saeed (PAK); W 2–0 | Song (CHN); L 0–2 | Did not advance | 3rd place, bronze medalist(s) |
| Botakoz Kapanova | Women's −49 kg | Bye | Okamoto (JPN); W 2–0 | Nematzadeh (IRI); L 0–2 | Did not advance | | |
| Aziza Karajanova | Women's −53 kg | Bye | Vũ (VIE); W 2–0 | Park (KOR); L 0–2 | Did not advance | | |
| Mariya Sevostyanova | Women's −57 kg | —N/a | Law (HKG); W 2–0 | Kim (KOR); L 0–2 | Did not advance | | |
| Nuray Khussainova | Women's −67 kg | —N/a | Faraj (PLE); W 2–0 | Sadikova (UZB); L 1–2 | Did not advance | | |
| Cansel Deniz | Women's +67 kg | —N/a | Bye | Selman (LBN); W 2–0 | Lee (KOR); L 1–2 | Did not advance | 3rd place, bronze medalist(s) |

== Tennis ==
Men

| Athlete | Event | Round of 64 | Round of 32 | Round of 16 | Quarter-finals | Semi-finals | Final | |
| Athlete | Event | Opposition Score | Opposition Score | Opposition Score | Opposition Score | Opposition Score | Opposition Score | Rank |
|---|---|---|---|---|---|---|---|---|
| Beibit Zhukayev | Singles | Bye | Mukhidinov (TJK); W 3–0^{r} | Nagal (IND); L 6–7^{(9–11)}, 4–6 | Did not advance | | | |
| Denis Yevseyev | Singles | Bye | Ferreira (TLS); W 6–0, 6–0 | Wu (TPE); W 2–6, 6–3, 6–4 | Watanuki (JPN); L 1–6, 1–6 | Did not advance | | |
| Beibit Zhukayev; Denis Yevseyev | Doubles | —N/a | Isroilov / Saidov (TJK); W 6–0, 6–0 | Hazawa / Uesugi (JPN); L 5–7, 5–7 | Did not advance | | | |
| Grigoriy Lomakin; Dmitry Popko | Doubles | —N/a | Alharrasi / Naif (QAT); W 7–6^{(7–2)}, 6–2 | Nam / Song (KOR); L 3–6, 7–5, [7–10] | Did not advance | | | |

Women

| Athlete | Event | Round of 64 | Round of 32 | Round of 16 | Quarter-finals | Semi-finals | Final | |
| Athlete | Event | Opposition Score | Opposition Score | Opposition Score | Opposition Score | Opposition Score | Opposition Score | Rank |
|---|---|---|---|---|---|---|---|---|
| Gozal Ainitdinova | Singles | Bye | Tjen (INA); L 1–6, 2–6 | Did not advance | | | | |
| Aruzhan Sagandykova | Singles | Bye | Bhosale (IND); L 6–7^{(2–7)}, 2–6 | Did not advance | | | | |
| Gozal Ainitdinova; Zhibek Kulambayeva | Doubles | —N/a | Al-Thani / Khalifa (QAT); W 6–0, 6–0 | Lee / Liang (TPE); L 6–7^{(5–7)}, 4–6 | Did not advance | | | |
| Zhanel Rustemova; Aruzhan Sagandykova | Doubles | —N/a | Bhosale / Thandi (IND); L 4–6, 2–6 | Did not advance | | | | |

Mixed

| Athlete | Event | Round of 64 | Round of 32 | Round of 16 | Quarter-finals | Semi-finals | Final | |
| Athlete | Event | Opposition Score | Opposition Score | Opposition Score | Opposition Score | Opposition Score | Opposition Score | Rank |
|---|---|---|---|---|---|---|---|---|
| Zhanel Rustemova; Dmitry Popko | Doubles | Bye | Rompies / Susanto (INA); L 4–6, 2–6 | Did not advance | | | | |
| Zhibek Kulambayeva; Grigoriy Lomakin | Doubles | Bye | Kim / Lee (KOR); W 7–6^{(7–5)}, 7–5 | Tukhtayeva / Isroilov (TJK); W 6–0, 6–1 | Bhosale / Bopanna (IND); L 5–7, 3–6 | Did not advance | | |

== Wrestling ==
Key:

- F – Victory by fall.
- PP – Decision by points – the loser with technical points.
- PO – Decision by points – the loser without technical points.
- ST – Great superiority – the loser without technical points and a margin of victory of at least 8 (Greco-Roman) or 10 (freestyle) points.
- WO – Victory by walkover (injury of the opponent)

Men's freestyle

| Athlete | Event | Qualification | Round of 16 | Quarterfinal | Semifinal | Repechage 1 | Repechage 2 | Final / BM | |
| Athlete | Event | Opposition Result | Opposition Result | Opposition Result | Opposition Result | Opposition Result | Opposition Result | Opposition Result | Rank |
|---|---|---|---|---|---|---|---|---|---|
| Rakhat Kalzhan | −57 kg | —N/a | Bilal (PAK); W 10–0 | Almaz Uulu (KGZ); L 0–10 ^{ST} | Did not advance | | | | 9 |
| Mukhtar Sanzhar | −65 kg | Tömör-Ochiryn (MGL); L 0–10 ^{ST} | Did not advance | | | Yon (CAM); W 11–0 | Kim (KOR); W 2–1 | Kim (PRK); L 6–11 ^{PO} | 5 |
| Darkhan Yessengali | −74 kg | Bye | Sumiyaabazar (MGL); W 2–1 | Abdurakhmonov (UZB); L 1–3 ^{PO} | Did not advance | | | | 11 |
| Azamat Dauletbekov | −86 kg | Bye | Kim (KOR); W 6–0 | Shapiev (UZB); L 3–4 ^{PO} | Did not advance | | | | 8 |
| Alisher Yergali | −97 kg | —N/a | Vicky (IND); W 10–0 | Ishiguro (JPN); W 4–2 | Goleij (IRI); L 1–3 ^{PO} | Bye | | Gankhuyag (MGL); L 1–8 ^{PO} | 5 |
| Yusup Batirmurzaev | −125 kg | —N/a | Anakulov (TJK); W 10–0 | Bali (CAM); W 5–2 | Hossein Zare (IRI); L 0–11 ^{ST} | Bye | | Buheeerdun (CHN); L 3–5 ^{PO} | 5 |

Men's Greco-Roman

| Athlete | Event | Round of 16 | Quarterfinal | Semifinal | Repechage | Final / BM | |
| Athlete | Event | Opposition Result | Opposition Result | Opposition Result | Opposition Result | Opposition Result | Rank |
|---|---|---|---|---|---|---|---|
| Aidos Sultangali | −60 kg | Huang (TPE); W 11–1 | Dalkhani (IRI); W 4–2 | Suzuki (JPN); L 0–9 ^{ST} | Bye | Ri Se-ung (PRK); L 1–2 ^{PO} | 5 |
| Meiirzhan Shermakhanbet | −67 kg | Hinmee (THA); W 10–0 | Li (CHN); W 10–8 | Sohrabi (IRI); W 6^{F}–9 | Bye | Endo (JPN); L 3–4 ^{PO} | 2nd place, silver medalist(s) |
| Azat Sadykov | −77 kg | Sakuraba (JPN); W 6–0 | Thamwirat (THA); W 8–0 | Makhmudov (KGZ); L 0–9 ^{ST} | Bye | Keo (CAM); W 0–0 ^{WO} | 3rd place, bronze medalist(s) |
| Maksat Sailau | −87 kg | Nghiem (VIE); W 11–0 | Berdimuratov (UZB); L 0–11 ^{ST} | Did not advance | Bye | Sumi (JPN); L 1–9 ^{ST} | 5 |
| Islam Umayev | −97 kg | Bye | Agamammedov (TKM); W 11–3 | Saravi (IRI); L 0–8 ^{ST} | Bye | Assakalov (UZB); L 0–7^{F} | 5 |
| Alimkhan Syzdykov | −130 kg | Bye | Nasimov (UZB); W 9^{F}–1 | Mirzazadeh (IRI); L 1–3 ^{PO} | Bye | Kurrayev (TKM); W 5–1 | 3rd place, bronze medalist(s) |

Women's freestyle

| Athlete | Event | Round of 16 | Quarterfinal | Semifinal | Repechage | Final / BM | |
| Athlete | Event | Opposition Result | Opposition Result | Opposition Result | Opposition Result | Opposition Result | Rank |
|---|---|---|---|---|---|---|---|
| Svetlana Ankicheva | −50 kg | Cheon (KOR); L 1–2 ^{PO} | Did not advance | | | | 8 |
| Marina Sedneva | −53 kg | Poruthotage (SRI); W 5^{F}–4 | Qianyu (CHN); L 6–12 ^{PO} | Did not advance | Nguyen (VIE); L 4–6 ^{PO} | Did not advance | 7 |
| Emma Tissina | −57 kg | Lim (SGP); W 8^{F}–0 | Hong (CHN); L 0–8^{F} | Did not advance | | | 7 |
| Irina Kuznetsova | −62 kg | Tserenchimed (MGL); W 6^{F}–4 | Pai (TPE); W 12–0 | Ozaki (JPN); L 0–8^{F} | Did not advance | Tynybekova (KGZ); L 1–2 ^{PO} | 5 |
| Yelena Shalygina | −68 kg | Bye | Nurtaeva (KGZ); L 7–8 ^{PO} | Did not advance | Bye | Delgermaa (MGL); L 6–10^{F} | 5 |
| Zhamila Bakbergenova | −76 kg | Oknazarova (UZB); W 7^{F}–0 | Ariunjargal (MGL); W 6^{F}–0 | Bishnoi (IND); W 4^{F}–2 | Bye | Tynybekova (KGZ); L 4–7 ^{PO} | 2nd place, silver medalist(s) |

== Wushu ==
Men's sanda

| Athlete | Event | Round of 16 | Quarterfinal | Semifinal | Final | |
| Athlete | Event | Opposition Score | Opposition Score | Opposition Score | Opposition Score | Rank |
|---|---|---|---|---|---|---|
| Karim Iminzhanov | Men's –56 kg | Jiang (CHN); L 0–2 | Did not advance | | | |
| Abdusamat Ashirov | Men's –65 kg | Abdul Rehman (PAK); W KO | Tabugara (PHI); L 0–2 | Did not advance | | |
| Nursultan Izmurzayev | Men's –70 kg | Hotak (AFG); L 0–2 | Did not advance | | | |
| Shokhzod Tashpolatov | Men's –75 kg | Sabriabibegloo (IRI); L 0–2 | Did not advance | | | |

Women's sanda

| Athlete | Event | Round of 16 | Quarterfinal | Semifinal | Final | |
| Athlete | Event | Opposition Score | Opposition Score | Opposition Score | Opposition Score | Rank |
|---|---|---|---|---|---|---|
| Ayan Tursyn | Women's –52 kg | Bye | Melikova (TKM); W PD | Li (CHN); L PD | Did not advance | 3rd place, bronze medalist(s) |
| Aiman Karshyga | Women's –60 kg | —N/a | Naorem (IND); L PD | Did not advance | | |

Key: * TV – Technical victory, PD – Gap point.
