= Shooting at the 2022 Asian Games – Women's 10 metre running target =

Women's 10 metre running target at the 2022 Asian Games
- Venue: Fuyang Yinhu Sports Centre
- Dates: 28 September 2023
- Competitors: 17 from 6 nations

Medalists
| gold medal | Zukhra Irnazarova | Kazakhstan |
| silver medal | Ri Ji-ye | North Korea |
| bronze medal | Paek Ok-sim | North Korea |

The women's 10 metre running target competition at the 2022 Asian Games in Hangzhou, China was held on 28 September 2023 at Fuyang Yinhu Sports Centre.

== Schedule ==
All times are China Standard Time (UTC+08:00)

| Date | Time | Event |
|---|---|---|
| Thursday, 28 September 2023 | 09:00 | Final |

== Records ==
Prior to this competition, the existing world, Asian and Games records were as follows.

| World Record | Li Xueyan (CHN) | 575 | Changwon, South Korea | 9 September 2018 |
| Asian Record | Li Xueyan (CHN) | 575 | Changwon, South Korea | 9 September 2018 |
| Games Record | — | — | — | — |

== Results ==
| Rank | Athlete | Slow | | | Fast | | | Total | Xs | S-off | Notes |
| Rank | Athlete | 1 | 2 | 3 | 1 | 2 | 3 | Total | Xs | S-off | Notes |
|---|---|---|---|---|---|---|---|---|---|---|---|
| 1st place, gold medalist(s) | Zukhra Irnazarova (KAZ) | 95 | 96 | 90 | 91 | 97 | 91 | 560 | 10 | | GR |
| 2nd place, silver medalist(s) | Ri Ji-ye (PRK) | 96 | 95 | 93 | 88 | 93 | 89 | 554 | 10 | | |
| 3rd place, bronze medalist(s) | Paek Ok-sim (PRK) | 94 | 92 | 95 | 93 | 86 | 91 | 551 | 8 | | |
| 4 | Pang Myong-hyang (PRK) | 95 | 87 | 93 | 89 | 92 | 94 | 550 | 10 | | |
| 5 | Rica Nensi Perangin Angin (INA) | 90 | 91 | 91 | 89 | 94 | 95 | 550 | 8 | | |
| 6 | Fatima Irnazarova (KAZ) | 91 | 93 | 93 | 87 | 82 | 95 | 541 | 9 | | |
| 7 | Alexandra Saduakassova (KAZ) | 96 | 89 | 97 | 88 | 93 | 78 | 541 | 6 | | |
| 8 | Feny Bachtiar (INA) | 94 | 91 | 94 | 87 | 88 | 84 | 538 | 11 | | |
| 9 | Amal Mohammed (QAT) | 93 | 96 | 87 | 88 | 83 | 91 | 538 | 8 | | |
| 10 | Nguyễn Thị Thu Hằng (VIE) | 89 | 91 | 88 | 83 | 94 | 89 | 534 | 13 | | |
| 11 | Lê Thảo Ngọc (VIE) | 86 | 94 | 94 | 88 | 82 | 90 | 534 | 7 | | |
| 12 | Anisa Saleh Juma (QAT) | 85 | 94 | 95 | 89 | 80 | 88 | 531 | 8 | | |
| 13 | Nourma Try Indriani (INA) | 95 | 90 | 89 | 81 | 76 | 85 | 516 | 12 | | |
| 14 | Dương Thị Trang (VIE) | 89 | 83 | 93 | 80 | 86 | 85 | 516 | 11 | | |
| 15 | Phoutsady Phommachanh (LAO) | 80 | 81 | 73 | 91 | 91 | 75 | 491 | 3 | | |
| 16 | Phayvone Vongphachanh (LAO) | 73 | 84 | 65 | 71 | 70 | 60 | 423 | 1 | | |
| 17 | Vongdeuan Chanthanivong (LAO) | 64 | 64 | 75 | 63 | 68 | 74 | 408 | 2 | | |
