= Shooting at the 2022 Asian Games – Women's 10 metre running target team =

Women's 10 metre running target team at the 2022 Asian Games
- Venue: Fuyang Yinhu Sports Centre
- Dates: 28 September 2023
- Competitors: 15 from 5 nations

Medalists
gold medal	North Korea; Paek Ok-sim, Pang Myong-hyang, Ri Ji-ye
silver medal	Kazakhstan; Fatima Irnazarova, Zukhra Irnazarova, Alexandra Saduakassova
bronze medal	Indonesia; Rica Nensi Perangin Angin, Feny Bachtiar, Nourma Try Indriani

The women's 10 metre running target team competition at the 2022 Asian Games in Hangzhou, China was held on 28 September 2023 at Fuyang Yinhu Sports Centre.

== Schedule ==
All times are China Standard Time (UTC+08:00)

Date	Time	Event
Thursday, 28 September 2023	09:00	Final

== Records ==
Prior to this competition, the existing world, Asian and Games records were as follows.

World Record	China	1673	Changwon, South Korea	9 September 2018
Asian Record	China	1673	Changwon, South Korea	9 September 2018
Games Record	—	—	—	—

== Results ==
Rank	Team	Slow			Fast			Total	Xs	Notes
Rank	Team	1	2	3	1	2	3	Total	Xs	Notes
1st place, gold medalist(s)	North Korea (PRK)	285	274	281	270	271	274	1655	28	GR
	Paek Ok-sim	94	92	95	93	86	91	551	8	
	Pang Myong-hyang	95	87	93	89	92	94	550	10	
	Ri Ji-ye	96	95	93	88	93	89	554	10	
2nd place, silver medalist(s)	Kazakhstan (KAZ)	282	278	280	266	272	264	1642	25	
	Fatima Irnazarova	91	93	93	87	82	95	541	9	
	Zukhra Irnazarova	95	96	90	91	97	91	560	10	
	Alexandra Saduakassova	96	89	97	88	93	78	541	6	
3rd place, bronze medalist(s)	Indonesia (INA)	279	272	274	257	258	264	1604	31	
	Rica Nensi Perangin Angin	90	91	91	89	94	95	550	8	
	Feny Bachtiar	94	91	94	87	88	84	538	11	
	Nourma Try Indriani	95	90	89	81	76	85	516	12	
4	Vietnam (VIE)	264	268	275	251	262	264	1584	31	
	Dương Thị Trang	89	83	93	80	86	85	516	11	
	Lê Thảo Ngọc	86	94	94	88	82	90	534	7	
	Nguyễn Thị Thu Hằng	89	91	88	83	94	89	534	13	
5	Laos (LAO)	217	229	213	225	229	209	1322	6	
	Vongdeuan Chanthanivong	64	64	75	63	68	74	408	2	
	Phoutsady Phommachanh	80	81	73	91	91	75	491	3	
	Phayvone Vongphachanh	73	84	65	71	70	60	423	1	
