= Kurash at the 2022 Asian Games – Women's 52 kg =

Women's 52 kg at the 2022 Asian Games
- Venue: Xiaoshan Linpu Gymnasium
- Dates: 30 September 2023
- Competitors: 20 from 11 nations

Medalists
gold medal	Khilola Ortikboeva	Uzbekistan
silver medal	Sitora Elmurodova	Uzbekistan
bronze medal	Aýnur Amanowa	Turkmenistan
bronze medal	Saowalak Homklin	Thailand

The women's 52 kilograms Kurash competition at the 2022 Asian Games in Hangzhou was held on 30 September 2023 at the Xiaoshan Linpu Gymnasium.

== Schedule ==
All times are China Standard Time (UTC+08:00)

Date	Time	Event
Saturday, 30 September 2023	09:30	Round of 32
Saturday, 30 September 2023	09:30	Round of 16
Saturday, 30 September 2023	09:30	Quarterfinals
Saturday, 30 September 2023	14:00	Semifinals
Saturday, 30 September 2023	14:00	Final

== Results ==
=== Final ===
Final
Khilola Ortikboeva (UZB)	101
Sitora Elmurodova (UZB)	000

=== Top half ===
Round of 32
Aýnur Amanowa (TKM)	100
Phạm Nguyễn Hồng Mơ (VIE)	000
Charmea Quelino (PHI)	011
Suchika Tariyal (IND)	001

Round of 16
Savira Diah Fitri (INA)	000
Aýnur Amanowa (TKM)	011
Oh Yeong-ji (KOR)	002
Wanida Raksat (THA)	001
Tolganay Abeuova (KAZ)	002
Ochirpüreviin Lkhagvakhüü (MGL)	000
Charmea Quelino (PHI)	000
Khilola Ortikboeva (UZB)	100

Quarterfinals
Aýnur Amanowa (TKM)	002
Oh Yeong-ji (KOR)	000
Tolganay Abeuova (KAZ)	000
Khilola Ortikboeva (UZB)	101

Semifinals
Aýnur Amanowa (TKM)	000
Khilola Ortikboeva (UZB)	100

=== Bottom half ===
Round of 32
Aýşirin Haýdarowa (TKM)	001
Pincky Balhara (IND)	011
Đỗ Thu Hà (VIE)	010
Riko Shimada (JPN)	010

Round of 16
Lee Ye-joo (KOR)	001
Pincky Balhara (IND)	010
Sitora Elmurodova (UZB)	010
Aruzhan Adaskhan (KAZ)	000
Saowalak Homklin (THA)	100
Ganboldyn Gantsetseg (MGL)	000
Riko Shimada (JPN)	004
Helen Aclopen (PHI)	001

Quarterfinals
Pincky Balhara (IND)	001
Sitora Elmurodova (UZB)	001
Saowalak Homklin (THA)	010
Riko Shimada (JPN)	001

Semifinals
Sitora Elmurodova (UZB)	102
Saowalak Homklin (THA)	000
