= Ju-jitsu at the 2022 Asian Games – Men's 69 kg =

Men's jiu-jitsu 69 kg at the 2022 Asian Games
- Venue: Xiaoshan Linpu Gymnasium
- Dates: 5 October 2023
- Competitors: 28 from 19 nations

Medalists
| gold medal | Nurzhan Batyrbekov | Kazakhstan |
| silver medal | Mohamed Al-Suwaidi | United Arab Emirates |
| bronze medal | Joo Seong-hyeon | South Korea |
| bronze medal | Aldiyar Serik | Kazakhstan |

The men's jiu-jitsu (ne-waza) 69 kilograms Ju-jitsu competition at the 2022 Asian Games in Hangzhou was held on 5 October 2023 at Xiaoshan Linpu Gymnasium.

== Schedule ==
All times are China Standard Time (UTC+08:00)

| Date | Time | Event |
|---|---|---|
| Thursday, 5 October 2023 | 09:00 | Elimination round of 32 |
| Thursday, 5 October 2023 | 09:00 | Elimination round of 16 |
| Thursday, 5 October 2023 | 09:00 | Quarterfinals |
| Thursday, 5 October 2023 | 09:00 | Semifinals |
| Thursday, 5 October 2023 | 09:00 | Repechage round 1 |
| Thursday, 5 October 2023 | 15:00 | Finals |

== Results ==
Legend

- SU — Won by submission (50–0)
- WO — Won by walkover

=== Main bracket ===
==== Final ====
| Final |
| Mohamed Al-Suwaidi (UAE) | 2 |
| Nurzhan Batyrbekov (KAZ) | 4 |

==== Top half ====
Elimination round of 32
Toktorbai Zhusup Uulu (KGZ) | 2
Khusrav Kholov (UZB) | 0
Mohammed Bin Huraymil (KSA) | 0
Choijamtsyn Tüvdentarvaa (MGL) | 0
Jafar Al-Tamimi (PLE) | 0
Kunnapong Hasdee (THA) | 0
Michael Bryant Tiu (PHI) | WO
Mohamed Al-Najjar (BRN)
Aldiyar Serik (KAZ) | 5^{SU}
Lee Jae-young (KOR) | 0
Mustafa Wakili (AFG) | 2
Ali Hassan (KUW) | 11

Elimination round of 16
Mohamed Al-Suwaidi (UAE) | 5
Toktorbai Zhusup Uulu (KGZ) | 2
Choijamtsyn Tüvdentarvaa (MGL) | 3
Kunnapong Hasdee (THA) | 0
Michael Bryant Tiu (PHI) | 0
Aldiyar Serik (KAZ) | 4^{SU}
Ali Hassan (KUW) | 0
Sultan Jabr (UAE) | 2

Quarterfinals
Mohamed Al-Suwaidi (UAE) | 4^{SU}
Choijamtsyn Tüvdentarvaa (MGL) | 0
Aldiyar Serik (KAZ) | 0
Sultan Jabr (UAE) | 0

Semifinals
Mohamed Al-Suwaidi (UAE) | 2
Aldiyar Serik (KAZ) | 2

==== Bottom half ====
Elimination round of 32
Abdelkarim Al-Rasheed (JOR) | 2
Khasanjon Nabiev (UZB) | 0
Elbegsaikhany Chinzorig (MGL) | 10^{SU}
Jedidiah Slayman (LAO) | 0
Noah Lim (SGP) | 6
Yousef Al-Dousari (KUW) | 0
Isa Kasymow (TKM) | 0
Ramshed Abdulloev (TJK) | 0^{SU}
Zhakshylyk Uranov (KGZ) | 10^{SU}
Moeun Lim Sopanha (CAM) | 0
Sukitpeerarat Jantanakha (THA) | 0
Osama Kandil (KSA) | 0

Elimination round of 16
Joo Seong-hyeon (KOR) | 2
Abdelkarim Al-Rasheed (JOR) | 2
Elbegsaikhany Chinzorig (MGL) | 0
Noah Lim (SGP) | 6
Ramshed Abdulloev (TJK) | 4
Zhakshylyk Uranov (KGZ) | 2
Osama Kandil (KSA) | 0
Nurzhan Batyrbekov (KAZ) | 9

Quarterfinals
Joo Seong-hyeon (KOR) | 0
Noah Lim (SGP) | 0
Ramshed Abdulloev (TJK) | 0
Nurzhan Batyrbekov (KAZ) | 7

Semifinals
Joo Seong-hyeon (KOR) | 2
Nurzhan Batyrbekov (KAZ) | 2^{SU}

=== Repechage ===
Repechage round 1
Choijamtsyn Tüvdentarvaa (MGL) | 2
Sultan Jabr (UAE) | 0
Noah Lim (SGP) | 8
Ramshed Abdulloev (TJK) | 0

Contests for bronze medals
Choijamtsyn Tüvdentarvaa (MGL) | 4
Joo Seong-hyeon (KOR) | 4
Noah Lim (SGP) | 0
Aldiyar Serik (KAZ) | 2
