= Judo at the 2022 Asian Games – Men's 81 kg =

Judo competition

Judo Men's 81 kg at the 2022 Asian Games
- Venue: Xiaoshan Linpu Gymnasium
- Location: Hangzhou, China
- Date: 25 September 2023

Medalists
gold medal	Somon Makhmadbekov	Tajikistan
silver medal	Lee Joon-hwan	South Korea
bronze medal	Abylaikhan Zhubanazar	Kazakhstan
bronze medal	Yuhei Oino	Japan

Competition at external databases
- Links: IJF • JudoInside

The men's 81 kilograms (half middleweight) competition in Judo at the 2022 Asian Games in Hangzhou was held on 25 September 2023 at the Xiaoshan Linpu Gymnasium.

In the final, Somon Makhmadbekov from Tajikistan won the gold medal.

== Schedule ==
All times are China Standard Time (UTC+08:00)

Date	Time	Event
Monday, 25 September 2023	10:00	Elimination round of 16
Monday, 25 September 2023	10:00	Quarterfinals
Monday, 25 September 2023	10:00	Repechage
Monday, 25 September 2023	10:00	Semifinals
Monday, 25 September 2023	16:00	Finals

== Results ==
=== Main bracket ===
==== Final ====
Gold medal contest
Lee Joon-hwan (KOR)	00
Somon Makhmadbekov (TJK)	01

==== Top half ====
Round of 32
John Viron Ferrer (PHI)	10 (yellow card)
Janga Bahadur Saru (NEP)	00

Round of 16
Lee Joon-hwan (KOR)	w/o
~~Khalil Rebahi (QAT)~~
Muso Sobirov (UZB)	10
Bùi Phước Tùng (VIE)	00
Nugzar Tatalashvili (UAE)	00
Yuhei Oino (JPN)	10
Gereltuyaagiin Bolor-Ochir (MGL)	10 (yellow card)
John Viron Ferrer (PHI)	00

Quarter-finals
Lee Joon-hwan (KOR)	10
Muso Sobirov (UZB)	00
Yuhei Oino (JPN)	10
Gereltuyaagiin Bolor-Ochir (MGL)	00

Semi-finals
Lee Joon-hwan (KOR)	10 (yellow card)
Yuhei Oino (JPN)	00

==== Bottom half ====
Round of 32
Soulisay Sayasan (LAO)	00
Sun Chuancheng (CHN)	10
Sajjad Sehen (IRQ)	00
Mehdi Fathipoorardal (IRI)	10 (yellow card)

Round of 16
Somon Makhmadbekov (TJK)	10
Muayad Thwaib (PLE)	00
Asad Masabirov (KGZ)	01
Sun Chuancheng (CHN)	00
Abylaikhan Zhubanazar (KAZ)	10
Lee Kwok Wing (HKG)	00
Askerbii Gerbekov (BHR)	10 (yellow card)
Mehdi Fathipoorardal (IRI)	00 (yellow card)

Quarter-finals
Somon Makhmadbekov (TJK)	10 (yellow card)
Asad Masabirov (KGZ)	00
Abylaikhan Zhubanazar (KAZ)	10
Askerbii Gerbekov (BHR)	00 (yellow card)

Semi-finals
Somon Makhmadbekov (TJK)	01
Abylaikhan Zhubanazar (KAZ)	00

=== Repechage ===
Repechage
Muso Sobirov (UZB)	10
Gereltuyaagiin Bolor-Ochir (MGL)	00
Asad Masabirov (KGZ)	00
Askerbii Gerbekov (BHR)	01 (yellow card)

Bronze medal contests
Muso Sobirov (UZB)	01
Abylaikhan Zhubanazar (KAZ)	11
Askerbii Gerbekov (BHR)	00
Yuhei Oino (JPN)	10 (yellow card)
