= Boxing at the 2022 Asian Games – Men's +92 kg =

Boxing competitions

Men's +92 kg at the 2022 Asian Games
- Venue: Hangzhou Gymnasium
- Date: 26 September – 5 October 2023
- Competitors: 13 from 13 nations

Medalists
gold medal	Bakhodir Jalolov	Uzbekistan
silver medal	Kamshybek Kunkabayev	Kazakhstan
bronze medal	Narender Berwal	India
bronze medal	Bayikewuzi Danabieke	China

The men's +92 kilograms event at the 2022 Asian Games took place from 26 September to 5 October 2023 at Hangzhou Gymnasium, Hangzhou, China.

== Schedule ==
All times are China Standard Time (UTC+08:00)

Date	Time	Event
Tuesday, 26 September 2023	14:00	Preliminaries – R16
Saturday, 30 September 2023	14:00	Quarterfinals
Tuesday, 3 October 2023	19:00	Semifinals
Thursday, 5 October 2023	19:00	Final

== Results ==
Legend

- DSQ — Won by disqualification
- KO — Won by knockout
- RSC — Won by referee stop contest
- WO — Won by walkover

Preliminaries – R16
Danis Latypov (BRN)	WO
Mohammad Mlaiyes (SYR)
Ju Tae-ung (KOR)
Iman Ramezanpour (IRI)	DSQ
Narender Berwal (IND)	KO
Oomatbek Elchoro Uulu (KGZ)
Ashish Duwadi (NEP)	1
Khaligiin Byeknur (MGL)	3
Mohamed Al-Hefeiti (UAE)
Muhammad Abroridinov (TJK)	RSC

Quarterfinals
Kamshybek Kunkabayev (KAZ)	5
Danis Latypov (BRN)	0
Iman Ramezanpour (IRI)	0
Narender Berwal (IND)	5
Bayikewuzi Danabieke (CHN)	RSC
Khaligiin Byeknur (MGL)
Muhammad Abroridinov (TJK)
Bakhodir Jalolov (UZB)	RSC

Semifinals
Kamshybek Kunkabayev (KAZ)	5
Narender Berwal (IND)	0
Bayikewuzi Danabieke (CHN)
Bakhodir Jalolov (UZB)	KO

Final
Kamshybek Kunkabayev (KAZ)	0
Bakhodir Jalolov (UZB)	4
