= Boxing at the 2026 Asian Games – Men's +90 kg =

Boxing competitions

Men's +90 kg at the 2026 Asian Games
- Venue: Nishio City Gymnasium
- Date: 25 September – 2 October 2026
- Competitors: 10 from 10 nations

Medalists
gold medal	Aibek Oralbay	Kazakhstan
silver medal	Jakhongir Zokirov	Uzbekistan
bronze medal	Narender Berwal	India
bronze medal	Amir Esmaeili	Iran

The men's +90 kilograms event at the 2026 Asian Games took place from 25 September to 2 October 2026 at the Nishio City Gymnasium, Nishio, Aichi Prefecture, Japan.

The gold medal was won by Kazakhstan's Aibek Oralbay, who defeated Uzbekistan's Jakhongir Zokirov by a 5–0 unanimous decision in the final. Narender Berwal of India and Amir Esmaeili of Iran took the bronze medals.

== Schedule ==
All times are Japan Standard Time (UTC+09:00)

Date	Time	Event
Friday, 25 September 2026	14:00	Round of 16
Sunday, 27 September 2026	19:00	Quarterfinals
Tuesday, 29 September 2026	15:00	Semifinals
Friday, 2 October 2026	18:30	Final

== Results ==
Legend

- RSC — Won by referee stop contest
- RSCI — Won by referee stop contest injury

Round of 16
Myrzakir Koshaliev (KGZ)	3
Döwlet Yslamow (TKM)	2
Amir Esmaeili (IRI)	RSC
Ju Tae-ung (KOR)

Quarterfinals
Aibek Oralbay (KAZ)	5
Myrzakir Koshaliev (KGZ)	0
Adthapong Saengtep (THA)
Narender Berwal (IND)	RSC
Jakhongir Zokirov (UZB)	5
Muhammad Abroridinov (TJK)	0
Amir Esmaeili (IRI)	3
Bayikewuzi Danabieke (CHN)	2

Semifinals
Aibek Oralbay (KAZ)	5
Narender Berwal (IND)	0
Jakhongir Zokirov (UZB)	RSCI
Amir Esmaeili (IRI)

Final
Aibek Oralbay (KAZ)	5
Jakhongir Zokirov (UZB)	0
