= 2026 World Judo Championships – Men's 81 kg =

Judo competition

Judo Men's 81 kg at the 2026 World Judo Championships
- Venue: National Gymnastics Arena
- Location: Baku, Azerbaijan
- Date: 7 October 2026
- Competitors: 48 from 35 nations
- Total prize money: €57,000

Medalists
gold medal	Tato Grigalashvili (4th title)	Georgia
silver medal	Zelim Tckaev	Azerbaijan
bronze medal	Omar Rajabli	Azerbaijan
bronze medal	Mihajlo Simin	Serbia

Competition at external databases
- Links: IJF

The men's 81 kg event at the 2026 World Judo Championships was held at the National Gymnastics Arena in Baku, Azerbaijan on 7 October 2026.

== Results ==
=== Finals ===
Semi-finals
(Georgia (country)) Tato Grigalashvili	100
(Serbia) Mihajlo Simin	000
(Azerbaijan) Zelim Tckaev	020
(Kazakhstan) Abylaikhan Zhubanazar	000 (yellow card)

Final
(Georgia (country)) Tato Grigalashvili	010
(Azerbaijan) Zelim Tckaev	000

=== Repechage ===
Repechage
(Slovenia) Nace Herkovič	000
(Azerbaijan) Omar Rajabli	010
(Belgium) Matthias Casse	001
(South Korea) Lee Joon-hwan	110

Bronze medal
(Azerbaijan) Omar Rajabli	101
(Kazakhstan) Abylaikhan Zhubanazar	001
(South Korea) Lee Joon-hwan	001 (yellow card)
(Serbia) Mihajlo Simin	011

=== Pool A ===
First round
(Italy) Manuel Parlati	010 (yellow card)
(Moldova) Petru Pelivan	000 (yellow card)
(Mongolia) Oyunchimegiin Shinebayar	001 (yellow card)
(Slovenia) Nace Herkovič	102
(United States) Johan Silot	000
(Switzerland) Aurélien Bonferroni	100
(United Arab Emirates) Gadzhimurad Omarov	003
(Bulgaria) Georgi Gramatikov	000 (yellow card)

Round of 32
(Canada) François Gauthier-Drapeau	000
(Italy) Manuel Parlati	010 (yellow card)
(Slovenia) Nace Herkovič	100
(Iran) Elyas Parhizgar	000
(Finland) Eetu Ihanamäki	000 (yellow card)
(Switzerland) Aurélien Bonferroni	001
(United Arab Emirates) Gadzhimurad Omarov	000 (yellow card)
(Georgia (country)) Tato Grigalashvili	012 (yellow card)

Round of 16
(Italy) Manuel Parlati	000
(Slovenia) Nace Herkovič	100 (yellow card)
(Switzerland) Aurélien Bonferroni	000 (yellow card)
(Georgia (country)) Tato Grigalashvili	110

Quarter-finals
(Slovenia) Nace Herkovič	000
(Georgia (country)) Tato Grigalashvili	100

=== Pool B ===
First round
(Ukraine) Vladyslav Kolobov	100
(Greece) Jordan Kouros	000
(Kazakhstan) Zhalgas Kairolla	101
(Turkey) Erman Gürgen	010 (yellow card)
Sibghatullah Arab	011
(Mali) Mahamadou Doucara	000 (yellow card)
(Hong Kong) Lee Kwok Wing	000 (yellow card)
(South Korea) Sim Jae-yun	102

Round of 32
(Serbia) Mihajlo Simin	110 (yellow card)
(Ukraine) Vladyslav Kolobov	000
(Kazakhstan) Zhalgas Kairolla	100
(Bahrain) Askerbii Gerbekov	000
(Azerbaijan) Omar Rajabli	110
Sibghatullah Arab	000
(South Korea) Sim Jae-yun	000
(Uzbekistan) Murodjon Yuldoshev	001

Round of 16
(Serbia) Mihajlo Simin	001
(Kazakhstan) Zhalgas Kairolla	000
(Azerbaijan) Omar Rajabli	002 (yellow card)
(Uzbekistan) Murodjon Yuldoshev	001 (yellow card)

Quarter-finals
(Serbia) Mihajlo Simin	111
(Azerbaijan) Omar Rajabli	000 (yellow card)

=== Pool C ===
First round
(South Africa) Timothy Meuwsen	000
(Moldova) Victor Sterpu	001 (yellow card)
(United Arab Emirates) Nugzar Tatalashvili	100 (yellow card)
(Serbia) Vasilije Grujičić	000 (yellow card)
(Montenegro) Jahja Nurković	001
(Romania) Adrian Şulcă	000
(Turkey) Vedat Albayrak	000 (yellow card)
(Argentina) Agustín Gil	001

Round of 32
(Azerbaijan) Zelim Tckaev	101 (yellow card)
(Moldova) Victor Sterpu	000
(United Arab Emirates) Nugzar Tatalashvili	100 (yellow card)
(Brazil) David Lima	000
(Belgium) Matthias Casse	001 (yellow card)
(Montenegro) Jahja Nurković	000
(Argentina) Agustín Gil	100 (yellow card)
(United States) Dominic Rodriguez	001

Round of 16
(Azerbaijan) Zelim Tckaev	100 (yellow card)
(United Arab Emirates) Nugzar Tatalashvili	000
(Belgium) Matthias Casse	100 (yellow card)
(Argentina) Agustín Gil	000

Quarter-finals
(Azerbaijan) Zelim Tckaev	011 (yellow card)
(Belgium) Matthias Casse	000

=== Pool D ===
First round
(South Korea) Lee Joon-hwan	001 (yellow card)
(Bahrain) Gadzhidavud Gasanov	000
(Puerto Rico) Adrián Gandía	000
(Italy) Antonio Esposito	001
(Australia) Keishin Ochi	012
(Niger) Abdoul Kader Boubacar Adamou	000
(Azerbaijan) Vusal Galandarzade	104 (yellow card)
(Bulgaria) Hristo Valkov	000

Round of 32
(Japan) Yuhei Oino	000
(South Korea) Lee Joon-hwan	100
(Italy) Antonio Esposito	100
(Ukraine) Mykhailo Svidrak	000
(Kazakhstan) Abylaikhan Zhubanazar	002 (yellow card)
(Australia) Keishin Ochi	000 (yellow card)
(Azerbaijan) Vusal Galandarzade	100
(Estonia) Saad Dikajev	000

Round of 16
(South Korea) Lee Joon-hwan	100 (yellow card)
(Italy) Antonio Esposito	000
(Kazakhstan) Abylaikhan Zhubanazar	100
(Azerbaijan) Vusal Galandarzade	000

Quarter-finals
(South Korea) Lee Joon-hwan	000 (yellow card)
(Kazakhstan) Abylaikhan Zhubanazar	001

== Prize money ==
The sums listed bring the total prizes awarded to €57,000 for the individual event.

Medal	Total	Judoka	Coach
Gold	€26,000	€20,800	€5,200
Silver	€15,000	€12,000	€3,000
Bronze	€8,000	€6,400	€1,600
