= Narender Berwal =

Indian amateur boxer (born 1994)

Personal information
- Born: 14 November 1994 (age 32) Sorkhi, Hisar district, Haryana, India
- Height: 1.92 m (6 ft 4 in)
- Military career
- Branch: Indian Army
- Service years: 2013–present
- Rank: Subedar
- Unit: Chinar Corps

Sport
- Sport: Boxing
- Weight class: Super heavyweight
Medal record
Men's amateur boxing
Representing India
World Cup
Silver medal – second place	2025 Greater Noida	+90 kg
Bronze medal – third place	2025 Astana	+90 kg
Asian Games
Bronze medal – third place	2022 Hangzhou	+92 kg
Bronze medal – third place	2026 Aichi–Nagoya	+90 kg
Asian Championships
Bronze medal – third place	2022 Amman	+92 kg
Commonwealth Games
Silver medal – second place	2026 Glasgow	+90 kg
South Asian Games
Gold medal – first place	2019 Kathmandu	+91 kg
Military World Games
Bronze medal – third place	2015 Mungyeong	+91 kg
Youth World Championships
Silver medal – second place	2012 Yerevan	+91 kg

Narender Berwal (born 14 November 1994) is an Indian amateur boxing who competes in the super heavyweight division. He is a Subedar in the Indian Army. He won the bronze medal in the men's +92 kg at the 2022 Asian Games and silver medal in the men's +90 kg at the 2026 Commonwealth Games.

== Early life ==
Narender Berwal was born on 14 November 1994 in Sorkhi village in Hisar district of Haryana. He is a Subedar in the Chinar Corps of the Indian Army.

== Career ==
Berwal started boxing in 2010, and trains at the Sports Authority of India centre in Bhiwani under coach Devraj. He won the bronze medal in the men's +92 kg at the 2022 Asian Games. He competed in the Super heavyweight category in the 2023 World Boxing Championships, and won his first two matches, before losing in the quarter-finals. In the 2025 World Boxing Cup, he won a bronze medal in the second stage in Astana, and a silver medal in the finals in New Delhi.

Berwal was part of the Indian squad for the 2026 Commonwealth Games at Glasgow. In the quarter-finals of the men's +90 kg event at the Commonwealth Games, he defeated Samoa's Michael Sako in the quarter-finals to progress to the semi-finals. In the semi-finals, he defeated Nigel Paul of Trinidad and Tobago to progress to the finals, where he lost to of Damar Thomas of England, winning the silver medal.
