= Abylaikhan Zhubanazar =

Kazakh judoka (born 2000)

Personal information
- Born: 5 February 2000 (age 26)
- Occupation: Judoka

Sport
- Country: Kazakhstan
- Sport: Judo
- Weight class: ‍–‍81 kg

Achievements and titles
- Olympic Games: R32 (2024)
- World Champ.: 5th (2026)
- Asian Champ.: (bronze) (2023, 2026)
Medal record
Men's judo
Representing Kazakhstan
Asian Games
Bronze medal – third place	2023 Hangzhou	‍–‍81 kg
Asian Championships
Bronze medal – third place	2026 Ordos	‍–‍81 kg
IJF Grand Slam
Gold medal – first place	2026 Lausanne	‍–‍81 kg
Silver medal – second place	2023 Tbilisi	‍–‍81 kg
Bronze medal – third place	2023 Ulaanbaatar	‍–‍81 kg
Bronze medal – third place	2024 Dushanbe	‍–‍81 kg
Bronze medal – third place	2024 Astana	‍–‍81 kg
Bronze medal – third place	2025 Tashkent	‍–‍81 kg
Bronze medal – third place	2025 Astana	‍–‍81 kg
Bronze medal – third place	2026 Paris	‍–‍81 kg

Profile at external databases
- IJF: 38407
- JudoInside.com: 113264
- Updated on 7 October 2026

Abylaikhan Zhubanazar (born 15 February 2000) is a judoka from Kazhakstan. He was a bronze medalist at the 2022 Asian Games and selected for the 2024 Summer Olympics.

== Career ==
In March 2023 he finished runner up in his division at 2023 Judo Grand Slam Tbilisi. In June 2023, he was a bronze medalist at 2023 Judo Grand Slam Ulaanbaatar. He was a bronze medalist in the 81 kg category at the delayed 2022 Asian Games in Hangzhou in September 2023.

In 2024, he was a bronze medalist at both 2024 Judo Grand Slam Dushanbe and 2024 Judo Grand Slam Astana. He was selected for the 2024 Summer Olympics in the Men's 81kg.

== Personal life ==
He is from the Kazaly in the Kyzylorda Region.
