= Alexandra Saduakassova =

Kazakh sport shooter (born 2002)

Personal information
- Born: 10 September 2002 (age 23)

Sport
- Country: Kazakhstan
- Sport: Sport shooting
Medal record
Sport shooting
Representing Kazakhstan
World Championships
Gold medal – first place	2023 Baku	10m running target mixed
Gold medal – first place	2023 Baku	10m running target mixed team
Silver medal – second place	2023 Baku	10m running target
Silver medal – second place	2023 Baku	10m running target team
Asian Games
Silver medal – second place	2022 Hangzhou	10m running target team
Asian Championships
Silver medal – second place	2019 Doha	10m running target mixed
Silver medal – second place	2021 Shymkent	10m running target mixed
Silver medal – second place	2023 Changwon	10m running target mixed
Silver medal – second place	2025 Shymkent	10m running target
Bronze medal – third place	2019 Doha	10 m running target mixed team
Bronze medal – third place	2023 Changwon	10m running target

Alexandra Saduakassova (Александра Талгатовна Садуакасова, born 10 September 2002) is a Kazakh sport shooter. She participated at the 2021 World Running Target Championships, winning two gold medals in the women's junior and mixed junior events. Saduakassova lost to Zuhkra Irnazahova in the bronze medal play-off at the 2021 Asian Airgun Championships.
