= Ri Ji-ye =

North Korean sport shooter

Personal information
- Nationality: North Korean
- Born: 18 December 1997 (age 28)

Sport
- Country: North Korea
- Sport: Shooting
- Event: Air pistol
Medal record
Women's shooting
Representing North Korea
World Championships
Silver medal – second place	2018 Changwon	10 m running target team
Asian Games
Gold medal – first place	2022 Hangzhou	10 m running target team
Silver medal – second place	2022 Hangzhou	10 m running target
Asian Championships
Gold medal – first place	2019 Doha	10 m running target mixed team
Silver medal – second place	2019 Doha	10 m running target team
Bronze medal – third place	2019 Doha	10 m running target
Bronze medal – third place	2019 Doha	10 m running target mixed

Ri Ji-ye (Korean: 리지예; born 18 December 1997) is a North Korean sport shooter. She won the gold medal in the 10 m running target team and a silver medal in the individual of 10 m running target at the 2022 Asian Games.

She participated at the 2018 ISSF World Shooting Championships, winning a medal.
