= Khilola Ortikboeva =

Uzbek wrestler (born 2005)

Personal information
- Native name: Hilola Ortiqboyeva
- Nationality: Uzbek
- Born: 2005 (age 20–21) Sirdaryo, Uzbekistan
- Height: 1.90 m (6 ft 3 in)
- Weight: 120 kg (265 lb)

Sport
- Country: Uzbekistan
- Sport: Wrestling
Medal record
Representing Uzbekistan
Women's kurash
Asian Games
Gold medal – first place	2022 Hangzhou	–‍52 kg

Khilola Ortikboeva (Uzbek: Hilola Ortiqboyeva, Russian: Хилола Ортикбоева; born 2005) is an Uzbek judoka and kurash athlete, competing in the under 52 kg weight category, and is a member of the Uzbekistan national team. She is the Asian champion in Kurash and a gold medalist at the Summer Asian Games.

== Biography ==
Hilola Ortikboyeva was born in the village of Beshbulak in the Gulistan District of the Sirdaryo Region, Uzbekistan. She began practicing wrestling at the age of 8. In 2023, she graduated from the Olympic Reserve College in Gulistan.

In early 2022, she won a gold medal at the Uzbekistan Kurash Championship in Samarkand. In the same year, at the Asian Kurash Championship in Dushanbe, Tajikistan, Hilola Ortikboyeva won a gold medal in the under 52 kg weight category, defeating a competitor from Chinese Taipei, Chia-Wen Tsou, in the final. Later, she earned a bronze medal at the Uzbekistan Junior Judo Championship. At the end of the year, she secured a gold medal at the World Kurash Championship. She also won a bronze medal at the Uchkun Muradov Memorial Judo Tournament. Ortikboyeva won a bronze medal at the Asian Youth Judo Championship at the end of the year.

In early 2023, she won a bronze medal at the Uzbekistan Junior Judo Championship for athletes born in 2003–2004 in the under 52 kg weight category. In the same year, at the Summer Asian Games in Hangzhou, China, in the Kurash competition in the under 52 kg category, both representatives of the Uzbekistan team met. Ortikboyeva emerged victorious, defeating Sitora Elmuradova.
