= 2011 World Judo Championships – Men's +100 kg =

Judo competition

Judo Men's +100 kg at the 2011 World Judo Championships
- Venue: Accor Arena
- Location: Paris, France
- Date: 27 August 2011
- Competitors: 56 from 45 nations

Medalists
gold medal	Teddy Riner (4th title)	France
silver medal	Andreas Tölzer	Germany
bronze medal	Aleksandr Mikhailine	Russia
bronze medal	Kim Sung-Min	South Korea

Competition at external databases
- Links: IJF • JudoInside

The men's +100 kg competition of the 2011 World Judo Championships was held on August 27.

== Medalists ==
Gold	Silver	Bronze
Teddy Riner (FRA)	Andreas Tölzer (GER)	Aleksandr Mikhailine (RUS); Kim Sung-Min (KOR)

== Results ==
=== Pool A ===
First Round
(France) Teddy Riner	100
(Brazil) Daniel Hernandes	000
(Germany) Robert Zimmermann	100
(Vanuatu) Nazario Fiakaifonu	000
(Peru) Carlos Zegarra Presser	000
(Mongolia) Batsuuri Namsraijav	101
(Hungary) Barna Bor	100
(American Samoa) Anthony Liu	000
(Slovenia) Matjaž Ceraj	100
(Bulgaria) Ivan Iliev	000

Quarterfinals
(France) Teddy Riner	100
(Germany) Robert Zimmermann	000
(Mongolia) Batsuuri Namsraijav	100
(Lebanon) Patrick Antaki	000
(Hungary) Barna Bor	110
(Argentina) Orlando Baccino	000
(Cameroon) Tieuni Ferid Mongue	000
(Slovenia) Matjaž Ceraj	100

Semifinals
(France) Teddy Riner	110
(Mongolia) Batsuuri Namsraijav	000
(Hungary) Barna Bor	010
(Slovenia) Matjaž Ceraj	001

Final
(France) Teddy Riner	100
(Hungary) Barna Bor	000

=== Pool B ===
First Round
(South Korea) Kim Sung-Min	100
(Morocco) El Mehdi Malki	000
(Netherlands) Grim Vuijsters	001
(Japan) Daiki Kamikawa	000
(Turkmenistan) Hudayberdi Sahedov	000
(Kyrgyzstan) Iurii Krakovetskii	001
(Philippines) Tomohiko Hoshina	000
(Georgia (country)) Adam Okruashvili	100
(Uzbekistan) Abdullo Tangriev	000
(Russia) Aleksandr Mikhailine	100
(United States) Anthony Turner	000
(Belarus) Ihar Makarau	100
(Romania) Vladut Simionescu	100
(Macau) Chan Ion Peng	000

Quarterfinals
(South Korea) Kim Sung-Min	101
(Netherlands) Grim Vuijsters	000
(Kyrgyzstan) Iurii Krakovetskii	000
(Georgia (country)) Adam Okruashvili	001
(Russia) Aleksandr Mikhailine	100
(Belarus) Ihar Makarau	001
(Spain) Ángel Parra	010
(Romania) Vladut Simionescu	011

Semifinals
(South Korea) Kim Sung-Min	001
(Georgia (country)) Adam Okruashvili	000
(Russia) Aleksandr Mikhailine	010
(Romania) Vladut Simionescu	001

Final
(South Korea) Kim Sung-Min	010
(Russia) Aleksandr Mikhailine	000

=== Pool C ===
First Round
(Egypt) Islam El Shehaby	001
(Netherlands) Luuk Verbij	010
(Algeria) Bilal Bourbiha	000
(China) Wang Hao	111
(Tunisia) Faicel Jaballah	100
(Andorra) Eric Risco de la Torre	000
(Mexico) Ramón Flores	000
(Kazakhstan) Yerzhan Shynkeyev	101
(France) Matthieu Bataille	100
(Estonia) Martin Padar	000
(Lithuania) Marius Paškevičius	001
(Brazil) Rafael Silva	101

Quarterfinals
(Netherlands) Luuk Verbij	102
(Israel) Asaf Zohar	002
(China) Wang Hao	000
(Tunisia) Faicel Jaballah	100
(Cuba) Oscar Braison	010
(Kazakhstan) Yerzhan Shynkeyev	000
(France) Matthieu Bataille	100
(Brazil) Rafael Silva	000

Semifinals
(Netherlands) Luuk Verbij	000
(Tunisia) Faicel Jaballah	101
(Cuba) Oscar Braison	111
(France) Matthieu Bataille	000

Final
(Tunisia) Faicel Jaballah	000
(Cuba) Oscar Braison	101

=== Pool D ===
First Round
(Germany) Andreas Tölzer	100
(Fiji) Nemani Takayawa	000
(Poland) Grzegorz Eitel	100
(Montenegro) Marko Radulović	000
(South Korea) Kim Soo-Whan	000
(Georgia (country)) Zviad Khanjaliashvili	100
(Japan) Keiji Suzuki	100
(United States) Michael Prieditis	000
(Iran) Mohammad Reza Roudaki	100
(Mongolia) Tuguldur Bayarsaikhan	000
(Iceland) Tormodur Jonsson	100
(Australia) Jake Andrewartha	000

Quarterfinals
(Germany) Andreas Tölzer	100
(Morocco) Jalal Benalla	000
(Poland) Grzegorz Eitel	100
(Georgia (country)) Zviad Khanjaliashvili	000
(Japan) Keiji Suzuki	100
(Russia) Dmitry Sterkhov	000
(Iran) Mohammad Reza Roudaki	100
(Iceland) Tormodur Jonsson	000

Semifinals
(Germany) Andreas Tölzer	100
(Poland) Grzegorz Eitel	000
(Japan) Keiji Suzuki	000
(Iran) Mohammad Reza Roudaki	100

Final
(Germany) Andreas Tölzer	100
(Iran) Mohammad Reza Roudaki	000

=== Repechage ===
Repechage		Third place
(Hungary) Barna Bor	000
(Russia) Aleksandr Mikhailine	100	(Russia) Aleksandr Mikhailine	011
		(Cuba) Oscar Braison	010

Repechage		Third place
(Tunisia) Faicel Jaballah	000
(Iran) Mohammad Reza Roudaki	100	(Iran) Mohammad Reza Roudaki	001
		(South Korea) Kim Sung-Min	110

=== Finals ===
Semi-finals
(France) Teddy Riner	100
(South Korea) Kim Sung-Min	000
(Cuba) Oscar Braison	000
(Germany) Andreas Tölzer	100

Final
(France) Teddy Riner	100
(Germany) Andreas Tölzer	000
