= 2008 World Judo Open Championships =

Judo competition

Judo 2008 World Judo Open Championships
- Venue: Palais des sports Marcel-Cerdan
- Location: Levallois-Perret, France
- Dates: 20–21 December 2008

Competition at external databases
- Links: EJU • JudoInside

The 2008 World Judo Open Championships were held at Palais des sports Marcel-Cerdan in Levallois-Perret, France, 20 and 21 December 2008.

== Medal overview ==
=== Men's events ===
| Event | Gold | Silver | Bronze |
|---|---|---|---|
| Open | Teddy Riner (FRA) | Aleksandr Mikhailine (RUS) | Grzegorz Eitel (POL) |
| Open | Teddy Riner (FRA) | Aleksandr Mikhailine (RUS) | Matthieu Bataille (FRA) |

=== Women's events ===
| Event | Gold | Silver | Bronze |
|---|---|---|---|
| Open | Tong Wen (CHN) | Elena Ivashchenko (RUS) | Megumi Tachimoto (JPN) |
| Open | Tong Wen (CHN) | Elena Ivashchenko (RUS) | Mika Sugimoto (JPN) |

=== Medals table ===
| Rank | Nation | Gold | Silver | Bronze | Total |
|---|---|---|---|---|---|
| 1 | France | 1 | 0 | 1 | 2 |
| 2 | China | 1 | 0 | 0 | 1 |
| 3 | Russia | 0 | 2 | 0 | 2 |
| 4 | Japan | 0 | 0 | 2 | 2 |
| 5 | Poland | 0 | 0 | 1 | 1 |
| Totals (5 entries) | | 2 | 2 | 4 | 8 |

== Tournament results ==
=== Men's event ===
==== Final ====
| Final |
| 1 | Riner (FRA) | 0010 |
| 2 | Mikhailine (RUS) | 0000 |

==== Pool A and B ====
Round of 64
Chedly (TUN) | 1010
Brata (ROU) | 0010

Round of 32
Riner (FRA) | 0200
Tulendibaev (UZB) | 0000
Padar (EST) | 0010
Takai (JPN) | 1000
Maret (FRA) | 0020
Zviad (GEO) | 0010
Chedly (TUN) | 0000
Vuijsters (NED) | 0010
Corrêa (BRA) | 0000
Bor (HUN) | 0010
Pin (FRA) | 0010
Bryanov (RUS) | 1010
Rybak (BLR) | 0000
Tölzer (GER) | 1000
Eitel (POL) | 0200
Demontfaucon (FRA) | 0001

Round of 16
Riner (FRA) | 1000
Takai (JPN) | 0000
Maret (FRA) | 0000
Vuijsters (NED) | 0010
Bor (HUN) | 0200
Bryanov (RUS) | 0000
Tölzer (GER) | 0010
Eitel (POL) | 1000

Quarterfinals
Riner (FRA) | 1000
Vuijsters (NED) | 0000
Bor (HUN) | 0000
Eitel (POL) | 1000

Semifinals
Riner (FRA) | 0030
Eitel (POL) | 0000

==== Pool C and D ====
Round of 64

Round of 32
Tangriev (UZB) | 0000
Robin (FRA) | 1100
Anai (JPN) | 0010
Makarau (BLR) | 0000
Bataille (FRA) | 1000
Parra (ESP) | 0100
Gankhuyag (MGL) | 0010
Jaballah (TUN) | 0100
Muneta (JPN) | 0020
Hernandes (BRA) | 0000
Wojnarowicz (POL) | 1010
Maripuu (EST) | 0000
Gujejiani (GEO) | 0000
Bonvoisin (FRA) | 0100
Mikhailine (RUS) | 1010
Matei (ROU) | 0000

Round of 16
Robin (FRA) | 1010
Anai (JPN) | 0020
Bataille (FRA) | 1000
Jaballah (TUN) | 0000
Muneta (JPN) | 0000
Wojnarowicz (POL) | 1000
Bonvoisin (FRA) | 0000
Mikhailine (RUS) | 0010

Quarterfinals
Robin (FRA) | 0100
Bataille (FRA) | 0110
Wojnarowicz (POL) | 0010
Mikhailine (RUS) | 0020

Semifinals
Bataille (FRA) | 0000
Mikhailine (RUS) | 1100

=== Women's event ===
==== Pool A-D ====
Round of 32
Ramanich (FRA) | 0010
Shekerova (UZB) | 0000
Mondière (FRA) | 0010
Chikhrouhou (TUN) | 1000

Round of 16
Tong (CHN) | 1010
Górnicka (POL) | 0000
Bisséni (FRA) | 1000
Oryashkova (BUL) | 1000
Ramanich (FRA) | 0000
Beinroth (GER) | 0200
Sokolova (RUS) | 0000
Tachimoto (JPN) | 0100
Chikhrouhou (TUN) | 0000
Qin (CHN) | 0100
Sugimoto (JPN) | 0010
Andeol (FRA) | 0000
Elena (RUS) | 0110
Lebrun (FRA) | 0000
Alonso (ESP) | 1020
Makuła (POL) | 0000

Quarterfinals
Tong (CHN) | 1100
Bisséni (FRA) | 0000
Beinroth (GER) | 0000
Tachimoto (JPN) | 1000
Qin (CHN) | 0000
Sugimoto (JPN) | 1000
Elena (RUS) | 1000
Alonso (ESP) | 0100

Semifinals
Tong (CHN) | 1010
Tachimoto (JPN) | 0000
Sugimoto (JPN) | 0000
Elena (RUS) | 1000

Final
Tong (CHN) | 0200
Elena (RUS) | 0000
