= 2010 World Judo Championships – Men's +100 kg =

Judo competition

Judo Men's +100 kg at the 2010 World Judo Championships
- Venue: Yoyogi National Gymnasium
- Location: Tokyo, Japan
- Date: 9 September 2010
- Competitors: 49 from 37 nations

Medalists
gold medal	Teddy Riner (3rd title)	France
silver medal	Andreas Tölzer	Germany
bronze medal	Matthieu Bataille	France
bronze medal	Islam El Shehaby	Egypt

Competition at external databases
- Links: IJF • JudoInside

The Men's +100 kg competition at the 2010 World Judo Championships was held at 9 September at the Yoyogi National Gymnasium in Tokyo, Japan. 49 competitors contested for the medals, being split in 4 Pools where the winner advanced to the medal round.

== Pool A ==
First Round
Teddy Riner (FRA)	100
Kim Soo-Whan (KOR)	000
Dmitry Sterkhov (RUS)	100
Robert Zimmermann (GER)	001
Martin Padar (EST)	101
Grzegorz Eitel (POL)	002
Tomohiko Hoshina (PHI)	100
Nemani Takayawa (FIJ)	000

Quarterfinals
Teddy Riner (FRA)	110
Lin Yu-Heng (TPE)	000
Dmitry Sterkhov (RUS)	102
Mohammad Reza Roudaki (IRI)	000
Martin Padar (EST)	000
Rafael Silva (BRA)	001
Jake Andrewartha (AUS)	100
Tomohiko Hoshina (PHI)	000

Semifinals
Teddy Riner (FRA)	111
Dmitry Sterkhov (RUS)	000
Rafael Silva (BRA)	100
Jake Andrewartha (AUS)	000

Final
Teddy Riner (FRA)	101
Rafael Silva (BRA)	000

== Pool B ==
First Round
Ihar Makarau (BLR)	010
Anis Chedly (TUN)	001
Paolo Bianchessi (ITA)	020
Davaanyam Altangerel (MGL)	000
Abdullo Tangriev (UZB)	100
Thormodur Jonsson (ISL)	000
Matjaž Ceraj (SLO)	022
Conor Driscoll (USA)	000

Quarterfinals
Kazuhiko Takahashi (JPN)	101
Ihar Makarau (BLR)	000
Makhmadamin Khonov (TJK)	000
Paolo Bianchessi (ITA)	100
Abdullo Tangriev (UZB)	000
Lasha Gujeiani (GEO)	001
Matjaž Ceraj (SLO)	100
Aleksandar Petkovic (SRB)	000

Semifinals
Kazuhiko Takahashi (JPN)	011
Paolo Bianchessi (ITA)	001
Lasha Gujeiani (GEO)	100
Matjaž Ceraj (SLO)	000

Final
Kazuhiko Takahashi (JPN)	020
Lasha Gujeiani (GEO)	000

== Pool C ==
First Round
Islam El Shehaby (EGY)	010
Marius Paškevičius (LTU)	001
Walter Santos (BRA)	000
Stanislav Bondarenko (UKR)	100
Andreas Tölzer (GER)	101
Kim Sung-Min (KOR)	000
Ángel Parra (ESP)	100
Bozidar Bozinic (SRB)	000

Quarterfinals
Islam El Shehaby (EGY)	020
Sugarjargal Boldpurev (MGL)	001
Stanislav Bondarenko (UKR)	101
Daniel McCormick (USA)	000
Andreas Tölzer (GER)	021
Adam Okruashvili (GEO)	000
Soslan Bostanov (RUS)	100
Ángel Parra (ESP)	000

Semifinals
Islam El Shehaby (EGY)	022
Stanislav Bondarenko (UKR)	000
Andreas Tölzer (GER)	020
Soslan Bostanov (RUS)	000

Final
Islam El Shehaby (EGY)	001
Andreas Tölzer (GER)	100

== Pool D ==
First Round
Keiji Suzuki (JPN)	000
Janusz Wojnarowicz (POL)	100
Vladut Simionescu (ROU)	101
Abubakr Rakhmonov (TJK)	000
Vladimirs Osnačs (LAT)	020
Liu Jian (CHN)	000
Grim Vuijsters (NED)	011
Yerzhan Shynkeyev (KAZ)	010
Oscar Braison (CUB)	100
Carlos Zegarra (PER)	000

Quarterfinals
Janusz Wojnarowicz (POL)	011
Vladut Simionescu (ROU)	001
Vladimirs Osnačs (LAT)	000
Matthieu Bataille (FRA)	100
Grim Vuijsters (NED)	110
Iurii Krakovetskii (KGZ)	001
Ramon Flores (MEX)	100
Oscar Braison (CUB)	000

Semifinals
Janusz Wojnarowicz (POL)	000
Matthieu Bataille (FRA)	002
Grim Vuijsters (NED)	101
Ramon Flores (MEX)	000

Final
Matthieu Bataille (FRA)	010
Grim Vuijsters (NED)	001

== Repechage ==
Repechage		Third place
Rafael Silva (BRA)	011
Lasha Gujeiani (GEO)	001	Rafael Silva (BRA)	001
		Matthieu Bataille (FRA)	101

Repechage		Third place
Islam El Shehaby (EGY)	100
Grim Vuijsters (NED)	000	Islam El Shehaby (EGY)	110
		Kazuhiko Takahashi (JPN)	010

== Finals ==
Semi-finals
Teddy Riner (FRA)	101
Kazuhiko Takahashi (JPN)	001
Andreas Toelzer (GER)	100
Matthieu Bataille (FRA)	000

Final
Teddy Riner (FRA)	001
Andreas Toelzer (GER)	000
