= Teddy Riner =

French heavyweight judoka (born 1989)

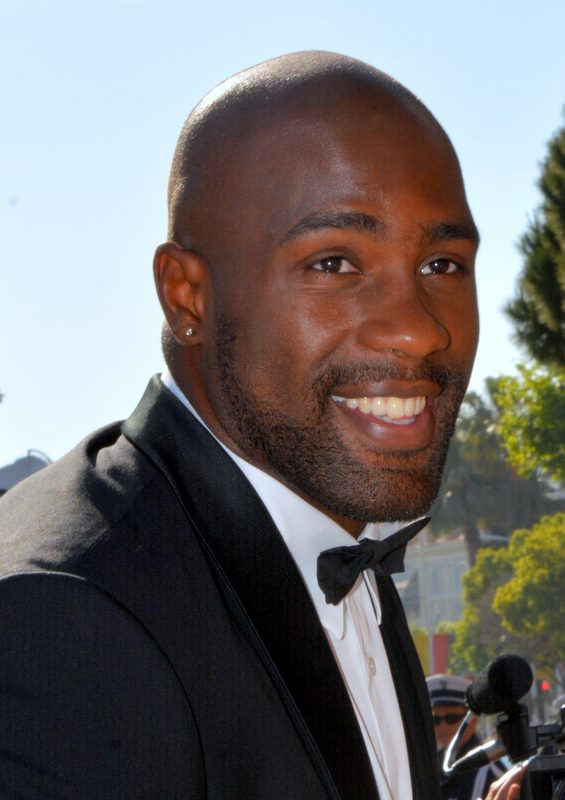
- Riner in 2016

Personal information
- Full name: Teddy Pierre-Marie Riner
- Nicknames: Teddy Bear, Big Ted, Big Teddy
- Born: 7 April 1989 (age 37) Pointe-à-Pitre, Guadeloupe, France
- Education: INSEP; Sciences Po (CSHN)
- Occupation: Judoka
- Height: 2.04 m (6 ft 8 in)
- Weight: 141 kg (311 lb)
- Life partner: Luthna Plocus
- Website: teddyriner.com/en/

Sport
- Country: France
- Sport: Judo
- Weight class: +100 kg
- Rank: 6th dan black belt
- Club: Paris Saint-Germain
- Turned pro: 2007–
- Coached by: Christian Chaumont, Benoît Campargue

Achievements and titles
- Olympic Games: (gold) (2012, 2016, 2024)
- World Champ.: (gold) (2007, 2008, 2009, 2010, 2011, 2013, 2014, 2015, 2017, 2017, 2023)
- European Champ.: (gold) (2007, 2011, 2013, 2014, 2016)
Medal record
Men's judo
Representing France
Olympic Games
Gold medal – first place	2012 London	+100 kg
Gold medal – first place	2016 Rio de Janeiro	+100 kg
Gold medal – first place	2020 Tokyo	Mixed team
Gold medal – first place	2024 Paris	+100 kg
Gold medal – first place	2024 Paris	Mixed team
Bronze medal – third place	2008 Beijing	+100 kg
Bronze medal – third place	2020 Tokyo	+100 kg
World Championships
Gold medal – first place	2007 Rio de Janeiro	+100 kg
Gold medal – first place	2008 Levallois‑Perret	Open
Gold medal – first place	2009 Rotterdam	+100 kg
Gold medal – first place	2010 Tokyo	+100 kg
Gold medal – first place	2011 Paris	+100 kg
Gold medal – first place	2011 Paris	Men's team
Gold medal – first place	2013 Rio de Janeiro	+100 kg
Gold medal – first place	2014 Chelyabinsk	+100 kg
Gold medal – first place	2015 Astana	+100 kg
Gold medal – first place	2017 Budapest	+100 kg
Gold medal – first place	2017 Marrakesh	Open
Gold medal – first place	2023 Doha	+100 kg
Silver medal – second place	2010 Tokyo	Open
Bronze medal – third place	2017 Budapest	Mixed team
European Championships
Gold medal – first place	2007 Belgrade	+100 kg
Gold medal – first place	2011 Istanbul	+100 kg
Gold medal – first place	2013 Budapest	+100 kg
Gold medal – first place	2014 Montpellier	+100 kg
Gold medal – first place	2016 Kazan	+100 kg
Silver medal – second place	2010 Vienna	Men's team
Silver medal – second place	2011 Istanbul	Men's team
Bronze medal – third place	2014 Montpellier	Men's team
World Masters
Gold medal – first place	2010 Suwon	+100 kg
Gold medal – first place	2011 Baku	+100 kg
Gold medal – first place	2015 Rabat	+100 kg
Gold medal – first place	2021 Doha	+100 kg
IJF Grand Slam
Gold medal – first place	2009 Paris	+100 kg
Gold medal – first place	2010 Paris	+100 kg
Gold medal – first place	2011 Paris	+100 kg
Gold medal – first place	2012 Paris	+100 kg
Gold medal – first place	2013 Paris	+100 kg
Gold medal – first place	2019 Brasilia	+100 kg
Gold medal – first place	2022 Budapest	+100 kg
Gold medal – first place	2023 Paris	+100 kg
Gold medal – first place	2024 Paris	+100 kg
Gold medal – first place	2024 Antalya	+100 kg
Gold medal – first place	2024 Dushanbe	+100 kg
IJF Grand Prix
Gold medal – first place	2014 Jeju	+100 kg
Gold medal – first place	2015 Qingdao	+100 kg
Gold medal – first place	2015 Jeju	+100 kg
Gold medal – first place	2016 Samsun	+100 kg
Gold medal – first place	2017 Zagreb	+100 kg
Gold medal – first place	2019 Montreal	+100 kg
World Juniors Championships
Gold medal – first place	2006 Santo Domingo	+100 kg
Gold medal – first place	2008 Bangkok	+100 kg
European Junior Championships
Gold medal – first place	2006 Tallinn	+100 kg
Bronze medal – third place	2005 Zagreb	+100 kg
Mediterranean Games
Gold medal – first place	2009 Pescara	+100 kg

Profile at external databases
- IJF: 385
- JudoInside.com: 32265
- Updated on 18 November 2026

Teddy Pierre-Marie Riner (/ˈriːnər/, French: [tedi pjɛʁ maʁi ʁinœʁ]; born 7 April 1989) is a French heavyweight judoka. A nine-time world champion in the heavyweight (+100 kg) division, two-time openweight world champion, and one-time world champion with the French men's team, he is the first and only judoka in history to win twelve gold medals at the World Judo Championships. He won the gold medal in the Men's +100 kg event at the Summer Olympics three times (2012, 2016, and 2024) and, as a member of the French team, in the mixed team event twice (2020 and 2024). Additionally, he is a two-time Olympic bronze medalist (2008 and 2020), a five-time European champion, a four-time World Masters gold medalist, and an eleven-time Grand Slam winner in his weight category. He is nicknamed "Teddy Bear", or "Big Ted".

Riner went undefeated between October 2010 and February 2020 before his winning streak was finally ended by Japanese judoka Kokoro Kageura in the third round of the 2020 Grand Slam Paris, marking Riner's first defeat in nearly a decade after 154 consecutive victories.

In November 2026, Riner announced his candidacy in the 2027 French presidential election.

== Early life and education ==
Riner was born on 7 April 1989 in Les Abymes, in Guadeloupe, an insular region of France in the Caribbean. The son of Moise and Marie-Pierre Riner, Teddy, his brother Moise Jr., and his parents left the island for Metropolitan France in the early '90s, before his second birthday. He was raised in Paris. At the age of 5, his parents enrolled him in a local multisport club in Aquaboulevard, Paris, where he played football, tennis, basketball, and other sports, but says he preferred judo "because it is an individual sport and it's me, only me."

At 15, he went to study at INSEP, joined the French national team, and began his professional career two years later. Riner earned a baccalauréat professionnel in micro-informatique (Baccalauréat with computer/IT focus) in 2009. He enrolled in a special certificate programme for high-level athletes (CSHN) at Science Po at the age of 22.

== Judo career ==
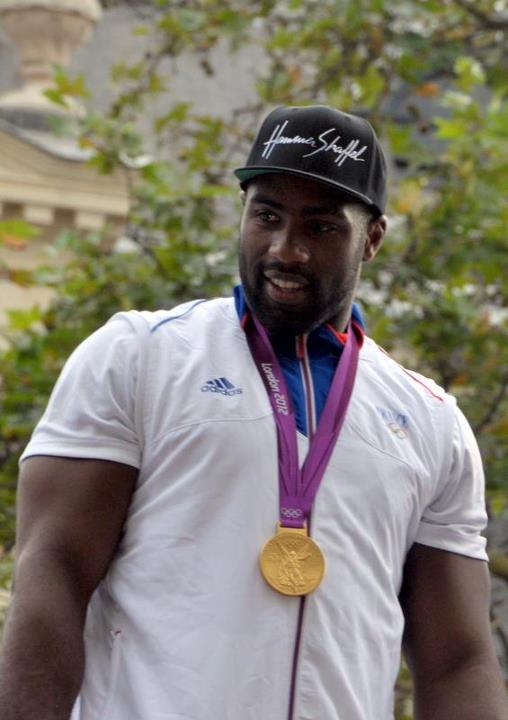
Teddy Riner in 2012

Riner was a member of the Levallois Sporting Club in Levallois-Perret before joining Paris Saint-Germain in August 2017. He is 2.04 metres (6 ft 8 in) tall and weighs 141 kilograms (311 lb).

He is coached by Christian Chaumont and Benoît Campargue. He won the World and European junior titles in 2006. In 2007, he won a gold medal at the European Judo Championships in Belgrade, Serbia, on the day after his eighteenth birthday. At the 2007 World Judo Championships in Rio de Janeiro, Brazil, he became the youngest ever senior world champion when he won the heavyweight (+100 kg) event, defeating the 2000 Olympic gold medallist, Kosei Inoue of Japan, in the semi-final.

At the 2008 Summer Olympics in Beijing, China, Riner competed in the men's heavyweight event. He received a bye into the second round of the competition before beating Anis Chedli of Tunisia and Kazakhstan's Yeldos Ikhsangaliyev to advance to the semi-finals. In the semis he was beaten by Uzbek judoka Abdullo Tangriev on the golden score, meaning Riner had to enter the repechage rounds. In the repechage he defeated Andreas Tölzer and João Schlittler to reach a bronze medal final against Lasha Gujejiani of Georgia; Riner took the bronze medal by a score of one ippon, one yuko and one koka to nil. In December 2008 he won his second World Championship gold medal at the Open weight Championships held in Levallois-Perret, France, by beating Alexander Mikhaylin of Russia in the final.

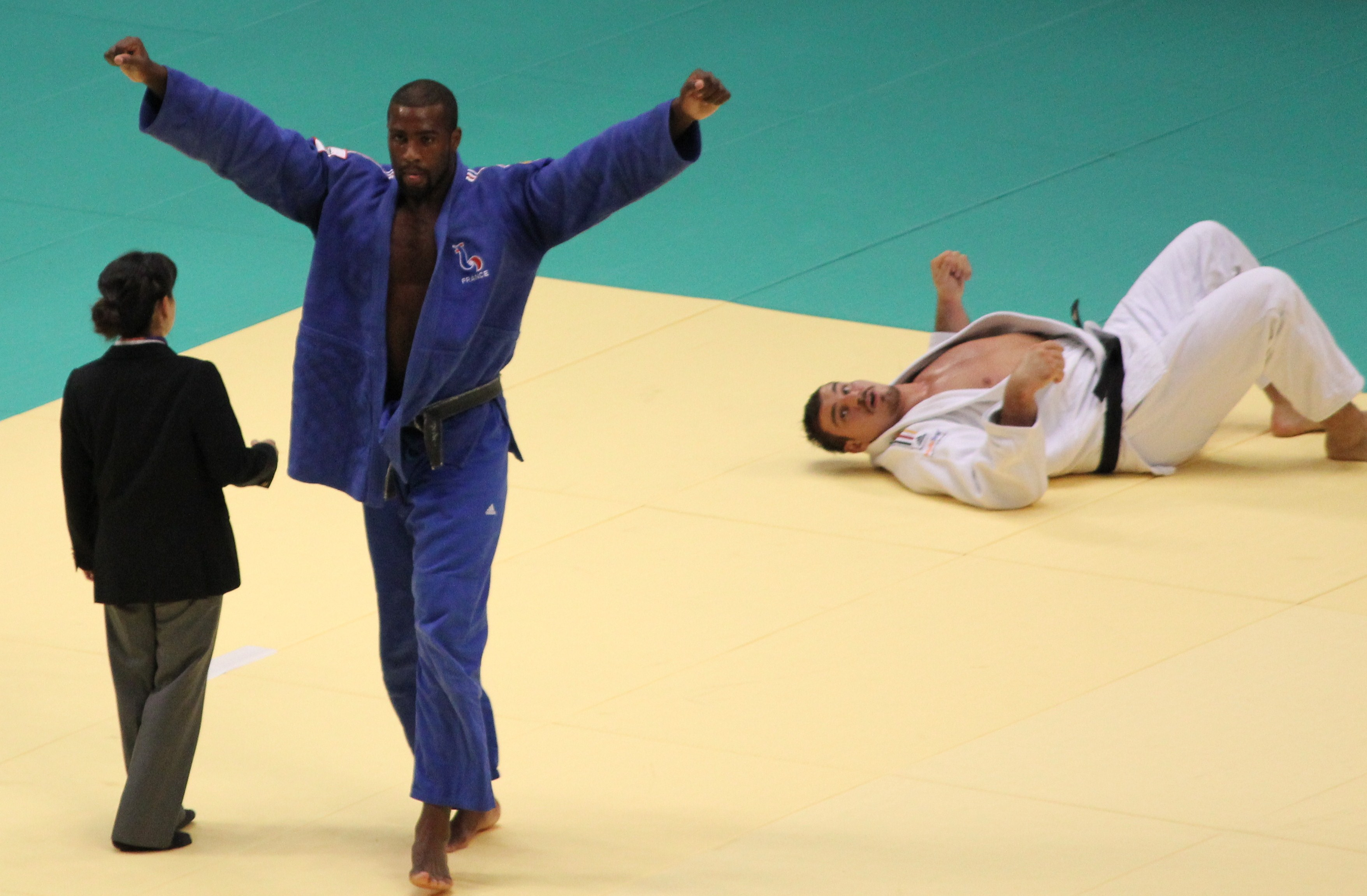
Riner defeating Tölzer in 2010 World Judo Championships

Riner won his third world title at the 2009 World Championships in Rotterdam, the Netherlands. He won bouts against Daniel McCormick, Vladimirs Osnachs, Ivan Iliev and Martin Padar in the pool stage before beating Marius Paškevičius in the semi-finals and Óscar Brayson in the final to take the gold medal.

In 2010, he won two medals, a gold and a silver, at the World Championships in Tokyo. After winning the +100 competition Riner was defeated by Daiki Kamikawa of Japan in the final of open weight class by a 2–1 judge's decision. After the bout, Riner refused to bow or to shake Kamikawa's hand, claiming that he "was robbed".

Riner won his second European gold medal at the 2011 Championships in Istanbul, Turkey. He defeated Nodor Metreveli, Emil Tahirov and Zohar Asaf to win Pool A of the +100 kg competition before defeating Estonian Martin Padar in the semi-finals and Barna Bor of Hungary in the final to win the title. At the 2011 World Judo Championships in Paris Riner won the gold medal in men's +100 kg division, beating Germany's Tölzer in the final. The result meant that Riner became the first ever male Judoka to win five world titles. He won his sixth World Championship gold medal as part of the French side that won the team event.

Riner was selected to compete for France at the 2012 Summer Olympics in London, England in the men's heavyweight event. The event took place at ExCeL London on 3 August. Riner won the gold medal by defeating Russia's Alexander Mikhaylin in the final.

At the 2016 Olympics, he defended his Olympics heavyweight title, defeating Hisayoshi Harasawa in the final.

In his career, Riner was only defeated nine times in elite international championships. He lost to Óscar Brayson and Tölzer in 2006, to Paolo Bianchessi and Yury Rybak in 2007, and to Yasuyuki Muneta and Grim Vuijsters in 2008. He lost to Abdullo Tangriev in the third round of the 2008 Summer Olympics, before winning the bronze medal, and on 13 September 2010 he lost the openweight title at the 2010 World Judo Championships in Tokyo to Daiki Kamikawa, his last defeat before a series of 154 consecutive victories. After almost 10 years, he lost in the third round of the Paris Grand Slam against World No. 2 Kokoro Kageura.

In 2021, he won the gold medal in his event at the 2021 Judo World Masters held in Doha, Qatar.

At the 2020 Tokyo Olympics, Riner achieved a bronze medal in the over 100-kilogram class following a defeat by Russian judoka Tamerlan Bashaev. He also won the gold medal in the mixed team event.

He also competed in the 2024 Summer Olympics, where he was one of the two individuals to light the Olympic cauldron in the Tuileries Garden, along with retired sprinter and fellow Guadeloupean Marie-José Pérec. He won the gold medal in the over 100-kilogram class, defeating the world champion Kim Min-jong from South Korea. With that, he equaled the record of Japan's Tadahiro Nomura, becoming one of the only judokas to have won three individual Olympic golds in judo.

The following day in the mixed team event, France faced Japan in the gold medal match for the second straight Olympics. Sanshiro Murao and Rika Takayama gave Japan an early 2–0 lead before Riner beat Tatsuru Saito. Natsumi Tsunoda subsequently put Japan on the brink of the gold medal, but Joan-Benjamin Gaba's shock win over Hifumi Abe and Clarisse Agbegnenou's win over Miku Takaichi leveled the score at 3–3 and forced a golden score tiebreaker. The 90+ kg men were randomly chosen, and Riner and Saito fought for 6 minutes and 26 seconds and both received shido twice before Riner successfully executed an ōuchi gari to achieve the gold medal-winning ippon. It marked Riner's fifth Olympic gold medal and saw France successfully defend their mixed team gold medal from Tokyo.

== Politics ==
Riner has regularly been questioned about a potential transition into politics. At the Choose France summit in May 2025, and later on RTL radio on 16 September 2026, he said that he was not closing any doors. Moreover, in June 2025, a Harris Interactive poll conducted for the newspaper L'Opinion revelealed that 18% of respondents considered him a credible candidate for the 2027 French presidential election.

On 9 November 2026, Riner announced he will be running for the 2027 presidential election. He was quoted as being worried about "the rise of the far right" in France. He commented that he would still compete in the 2028 Summer Olympics in Los Angeles if elected, "if the job allows and the French people permit".

== Personal life ==
With his partner, Luthna Plocus, Riner has a son born in 2014 and a daughter born in 2018.

== Awards and honours ==
- 2016: Officier de l'ordre national du Mérite
- 2011: RTL Champion of Champions – This annual sports award was inaugurated in 2008 and is awarded by RTL, a French commercial radio network. The previous winners were Alain Bernard (2008), Sébastien Loeb (2009) and Christophe Lemaitre (2010).
- 2012: L'Équipe Champion of Champions (France male category)
- 2013: Chevalier (Knight) of the Legion of Honour
- 2024: Along with Marie-José Pérec, one of the two final torchbearers of the Olympic torch relay who lit the Olympic cauldron in the Tuileries Garden at the opening ceremony of the 2024 Summer Olympics in Paris

Awards and achievements
Preceded by Nikola Karabatić; Florent Manaudou	French Sportsman of the Year; 2012; 2016, 2017	Succeeded by Tony Parker; Kevin Mayer
Olympic Games
Preceded by Laura Flessel-Colovic	Flagbearer for France; Rio de Janeiro 2016	Succeeded by Clarisse Agbegnenou; Samir Aït Saïd
Preceded by (China) Dinigeer Yilamujiang and Zhao Jiawen	Final Olympic torchbearer Paris 2024 along Marie-José Pérec	Succeeded by (Italy) Deborah Compagnoni, Sofia Goggia, and Alberto Tomba
Preceded by (Japan) Naomi Osaka	Final Summer Olympic torchbearer Paris 2024 along Marie-José Pérec	Succeeded by (United States) TBA 2028
