= 2010 World Judo Championships – Men's Open =

Judo competition

Judo Men's Open at the 2010 World Judo Championships
- Venue: Yoyogi National Gymnasium
- Location: Tokyo, Japan
- Date: 13 September 2010
- Competitors: 67 from 36 nations

Medalists
gold medal	Daiki Kamikawa (1st title)	Japan
silver medal	Teddy Riner	France
bronze medal	Keiji Suzuki	Japan
bronze medal	Hiroki Tachiyama	Japan

Competition at external databases
- Links: IJF • JudoInside

The Men's Open competition at the 2010 World Judo Championships was held at 13 September at the Yoyogi National Gymnasium in Tokyo, Japan. 67 competitors contested for the medals, being split in 4 Pools where the winner advanced to the medal round.

== Pool A ==
- Last 32 fights:
  - (United States) Eric Anderson 000 vs. (Iran) Mohammad Reza Roudaki 110
  - (Germany) Robert Zimmermann 013 vs. (South Korea) Kim Sung-Min 002

First Round
(Fiji) Nacanieli Takayawa	000
(Iran) Mohammad Reza Roudaki	102
(Poland) Przemyslaw Matyjaszek	000
(Tunisia) Anis Chedly	001
(Mongolia) Munkhbaatar Khadbaatar	000
(Japan) Kazuhiko Takahashi	001
(Georgia (country)) Aleksandre Mskhaladze	101
(Australia) Joshua Dahl	000
(Peru) Carlos Presser	110
(Serbia) Bozidar Bozinic	000
(Democratic Republic of the Congo) Mushi Ndibu	000
(France) Teddy Riner	111
(Germany) Robert Zimmermann	001
(Kazakhstan) Yerzhan Shynkeyev	101
(Brazil) Rafael Silva	000
(Estonia) Martin Padar	001

Quarterfinals
(Iran) Mohammad Reza Roudaki	100
(Tunisia) Anis Chedly	000
(Japan) Kazuhiko Takahashi	100
(Georgia (country)) Aleksandre Mskhaladze	000
(Peru) Carlos Presser	000
(France) Teddy Riner	100
(Kazakhstan) Yerzhan Shynkeyev	000
(Estonia) Martin Padar	100

Semifinals
(Iran) Mohammad Reza Roudaki	000
(Japan) Kazuhiko Takahashi	101
(France) Teddy Riner	100
(Estonia) Martin Padar	000

Final
(Japan) Kazuhiko Takahashi	000
(France) Teddy Riner	101

== Pool B ==
- Last 32 fight: (Egypt) Islam El Shehaby 020 vs. (Serbia) Rju Mijalkovic 000

First Round
(South Korea) Park Sun-woo	021
(Turkmenistan) Hudayberdi Sahataov	001
(Italy) Paolo Bianchessi	001
(China) Liu Jian	000
(Belarus) Ihar Makarau	001
(Cuba) Oreydi Despaigne	002
(Japan) Hiroki Tachiyama	100
(Australia) Duke Didier	000
(Pakistan) Shah Hussain	100
(New Zealand) Jason Koster	000
(Brazil) Luciano Corrêa	000
(Uzbekistan) Ramziddin Sayidov	100
(Egypt) Islam El Shehaby	000
(Russia) Sergey Prokin	100

Quarterfinals
(South Korea) Park Sun-woo	000
(Italy) Paolo Bianchessi	001
(Cuba) Oreydi Despaigne	000
(Japan) Hiroki Tachiyama	100
(Pakistan) Shah Hussain	000
(Mongolia) Tuguldur Bayarsaikhan	100
(Uzbekistan) Ramziddin Sayidov	002
(Russia) Sergey Prokin	001

Semifinals
(Italy) Paolo Bianchessi	000
(Japan) Hiroki Tachiyama	010
(Mongolia) Tuguldur Bayarsaikhan	000
(Uzbekistan) Ramziddin Sayidov	100

Final
(Japan) Hiroki Tachiyama	100
(Uzbekistan) Ramziddin Sayidov	010

== Pool C ==
- Last 32 fight: (Kazakhstan) Beibit Istybayev 000 vs. (Cuba) Oscar Brayson 101

First Round
(Mongolia) Temuulen Battulga	000
(China) Wang Hao	100
(Uzbekistan) Utkir Kurbanov	011
(Kyrgyzstan) Iurii Krakovetskii	000
(Serbia) Aleksandar Petkovic	100
(Australia) Priscus Fogagnolo	000
(United States) Anderson Leal	001
(Mexico) Ramon Flores	000
(Poland) Janusz Wojnarowicz	000
(Georgia (country)) Adam Okruashvili	001
(Japan) Keiji Suzuki	100
(South Korea) Kim Soo-Whan	000
(Iran) Siamak Adl-Kasravi	100
(Fiji) Nemani Takayawa	000
(Philippines) Tomohiko Hoshina	000
(Cuba) Oscar Brayson	100

Quarterfinals
(China) Wang Hao	100
(Uzbekistan) Utkir Kurbanov	000
(Serbia) Aleksandar Petkovic	000
(United States) Anderson Leal	001
(Georgia (country)) Adam Okruashvili	000
(Japan) Keiji Suzuki	100
(Iran) Siamak Adl-Kasravi	000
(Cuba) Oscar Brayson	010

Semifinals
(China) Wang Hao	100
(United States) Anderson Leal	000
(Japan) Keiji Suzuki	100
(Cuba) Oscar Brayson	000

Final
(China) Wang Hao	000
(Japan) Keiji Suzuki	100

== Pool D ==
- Last 32 fight: (Sweden) Martin Pacek 000 vs. (Serbia) Milan Disovic 010

First Round
(Georgia (country)) Levan Zhorzholiani	001
(Spain) Ángel Parra	010
(Mongolia) Sugarjargal Boldpurev	000
(Lithuania) Marius Paškevičius	100
(Australia) Jake Andrewartha	000
(Uzbekistan) Abdullo Tangriev	101
(Germany) Andreas Tölzer	100
(France) Frédéric Stiegelmann	000
(Iceland) Thormodur Jonsson	000
(Japan) Daiki Kamikawa	100
(Brazil) Walter Santos	100
(Tajikistan) Aminjon Chonov	000
(South Korea) Hwang Hee-Tae	111
(Russia) Aslan Kambiev	002

Quarterfinals
(Spain) Ángel Parra	000
(Lithuania) Marius Paškevičius	100
(Serbia) Milan Disovic	000
(Uzbekistan) Abdullo Tangriev	020
(Germany) Andreas Tölzer	000
(Japan) Daiki Kamikawa	100
(Brazil) Walter Santos	010
(South Korea) Hwang Hee-Tae	011

Semifinals
(Lithuania) Marius Paškevičius	000
(Uzbekistan) Abdullo Tangriev	010
(Japan) Daiki Kamikawa	100
(South Korea) Hwang Hee-Tae	000

Final
(Uzbekistan) Abdullo Tangriev	001
(Japan) Daiki Kamikawa	011

== Repechage ==
Repechage		Third place
(Japan) Kazuhiko Takahashi	000
(Uzbekistan) Ramziddin Sayidov	100	(Uzbekistan) Ramziddin Sayidov	000
		(Japan) Keiji Suzuki	100

Repechage		Third place
(China) Wang Hao	000
(Uzbekistan) Abdullo Tangriev	110	(Uzbekistan) Abdullo Tangriev	000
		(Japan) Hiroki Tachiyama	010

== Finals ==
Semi-finals
(France) Teddy Riner	011
(Japan) Hiroki Tachiyama	000
(Japan) Keiji Suzuki	000
(Japan) Daiki Kamikawa	100

Final
(France) Teddy Riner	000
(Japan) Daiki Kamikawa	000
