= Matthieu Bataille =

French judoka (born 1978)

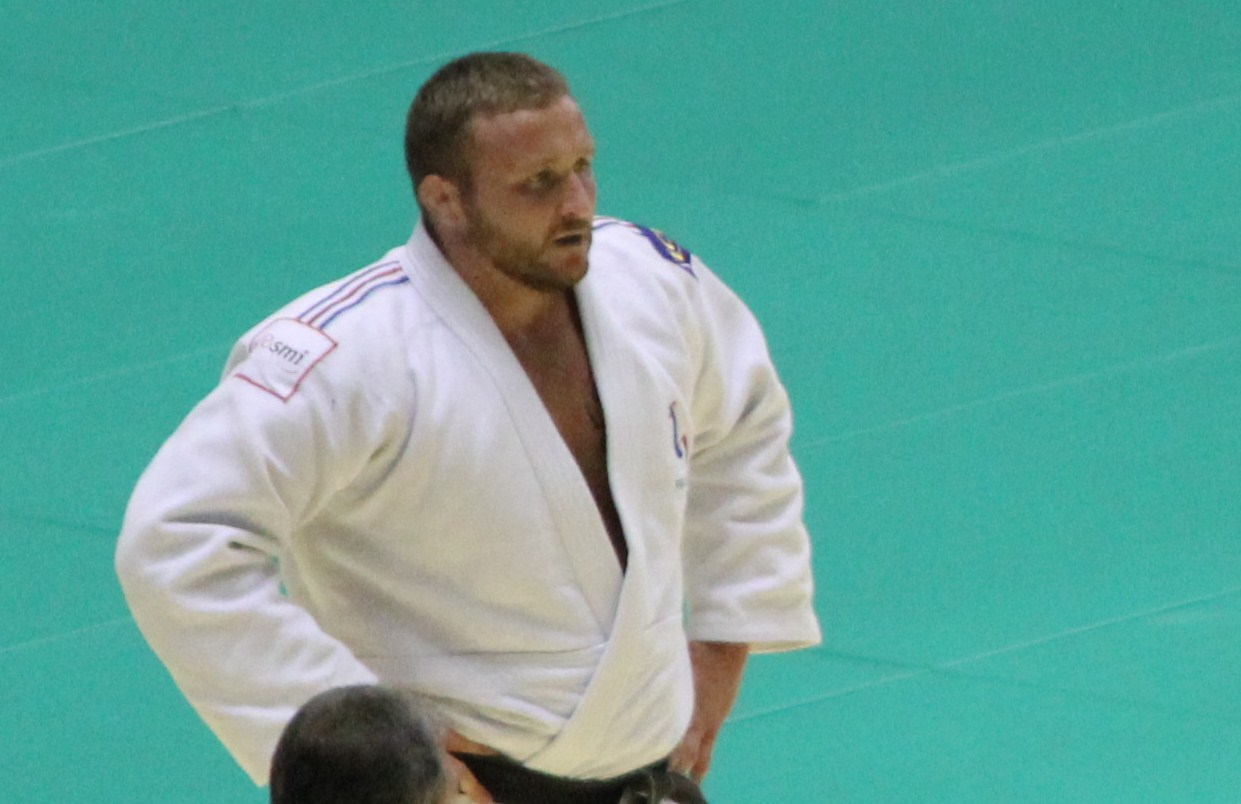
- Bataille during the 2010 World Judo Championships held in Tokyo, Japan

Personal information
- Born: 26 July 1978 (age 47)
- Occupation: Judo referee

Sport
- Country: France
- Sport: Judo
- Weight class: +100 kg, Open

Achievements and titles
- Olympic Games: R32 (2004)
- World Champ.: (bronze) (2007, 2008, 2010)
- European Champ.: (gold) (2004)
Medal record
Men's judo
Representing France
World Championships
Gold medal – first place	2011 Paris	Men's team
Bronze medal – third place	2006 Paris	Men's team
Bronze medal – third place	2007 Rio de Janeiro	Open
Bronze medal – third place	2008 Paris Levallois	Open
Bronze medal – third place	2010 Tokyo	+100 kg
European Championships
Gold medal – first place	2004 Paris	Men's team
Gold medal – first place	2004 Budapest	Open
Silver medal – second place	2010 Vienna	Men's team
Bronze medal – third place	2005 Moscow	Open

Profile at external databases
- IJF: 2713
- JudoInside.com: 338
- Updated on 25 July 2023

Matthieu Bataille (born 26 July 1978 in Cucq) is a French judoka.

== Achievements ==
Year	Tournament	Place	Weight class
2007	World Judo Championships	3rd	Open class
2006	European Open Championships	5th	Open class
2005	European Open Championships	3rd	Open class
2004	European Open Championships	1st	Open class
2001	Mediterranean Games	3rd	Heavyweight (+100 kg)
