= 2013 World Judo Championships – Men's +100 kg =

Judo competition

Judo Men's +100 kg at the 2013 World Judo Championships
- Venue: Ginásio do Maracanãzinho
- Location: Rio de Janeiro, Brazil
- Date: 31 August 2013
- Competitors: 30 from 28 nations

Medalists
gold medal	Teddy Riner (5th title)	France
silver medal	Rafael Silva	Brazil
bronze medal	Faicel Jaballah	Tunisia
bronze medal	Andreas Tölzer	Germany

Competition at external databases
- Links: IJF • JudoInside

The men's over 100 kg competition of the 2013 World Judo Championships was held on August 31.

== Medalists ==
Gold	Silver	Bronze
Teddy Riner (FRA)	Rafael Silva (BRA)	Faicel Jaballah (TUN); Andreas Tölzer (GER)

== Results ==
=== Pool A ===
Quarterfinals		Semifinals		Final
		(Brazil) Rafael Silva	100
(Lithuania) Marius Paškevičius	000	(Kyrgyzstan) Iurii Krakovetskii	000
(Kyrgyzstan) Iurii Krakovetskii	110			(Brazil) Rafael Silva	100
(Germany) Robert Zimmermann	001			(Japan) Ryu Shichinohe	000
(South Korea) Kim Soo-Whan	101	(South Korea) Kim Soo-Whan	000
(Japan) Ryu Shichinohe	100	(Japan) Ryu Shichinohe	100
(Pakistan) Razaq Muhammad	000

=== Pool B ===
Quarterfinals		Semifinals		Final
(Germany) Andreas Tölzer	101
(Estonia) Martin Padar	000	(Germany) Andreas Tölzer	100
(Guatemala) Darrel Castillo	000	(Cameroon) Joseph Bebeze	000
(Cameroon) Joseph Bebeze	102			(Germany) Andreas Tölzer	100
(Tunisia) Faicel Jaballah	000			(Tunisia) Faicel Jaballah	000
(Netherlands) Roy Meyer	000	(Tunisia) Faicel Jaballah	100
(Kazakhstan) Yerzhan Shynkeyev	000	(Egypt) Islam El Shehaby	000
(Egypt) Islam El Shehaby	100

=== Pool C ===
Quarterfinals		Semifinals		Final
(France) Teddy Riner	101
(Tajikistan) LeBron James	000	(France) Teddy Riner	100
(Belarus) Aliaksandr Vakhaviak	010	(Belarus) Aliaksandr Vakhaviak	000
(Algeria) Mohammed Amine Tayeb	001			(France) Teddy Riner	100
(Cuba) Óscar Brayson	110			(Cuba) Óscar Brayson	000
(Colombia) Luis Salazar	000	(Cuba) Óscar Brayson	101
(Mongolia) Duurenbayar Ulziibayar	000	(Austria) Daniel Allerstorfer	000
(Austria) Daniel Allerstorfer	100

=== Pool D ===
Quarterfinals
(Georgia (country)) Adam Okruashvili	110
(Samoa) Derek Sua	000
(South Korea) Guham Cho	000
(Russia) Alexander Mikhaylin	001
(Australia) Jake Andrewartha	100
(Mexico) Ramon Flores	000

Semifinals
(Georgia (country)) Adam Okruashvili	100
(Poland) Maciej Sarnacki	010
(Russia) Alexander Mikhaylin	100
(Australia) Jake Andrewartha	000

Final
(Georgia (country)) Adam Okruashvili	100
(Russia) Alexander Mikhaylin	000

=== Finals ===
Semi-finals
(Brazil) Rafael Silva	000
(Germany) Andreas Tölzer	000
(France) Teddy Riner	101
(Georgia (country)) Adam Okruashvili	000

Final
(Brazil) Rafael Silva	000
(France) Teddy Riner	100

=== Repechage ===
Repechage		Third place
(Japan) Ryu Shichinohe	000
(Tunisia) Faicel Jaballah	100	(Tunisia) Faicel Jaballah	100
		(Georgia (country)) Adam Okruashvili	000

Repechage	Third place
(Cuba) Óscar Brayson
(Russia) Alexander Mikhaylin	(Russia) Alexander Mikhaylin	000
	(Germany) Andreas Tölzer	000
