= Judo at the 2012 Summer Olympics – Men's +100 kg =

Judo competition

Men's +100kg at the Games of the XXX Olympiad
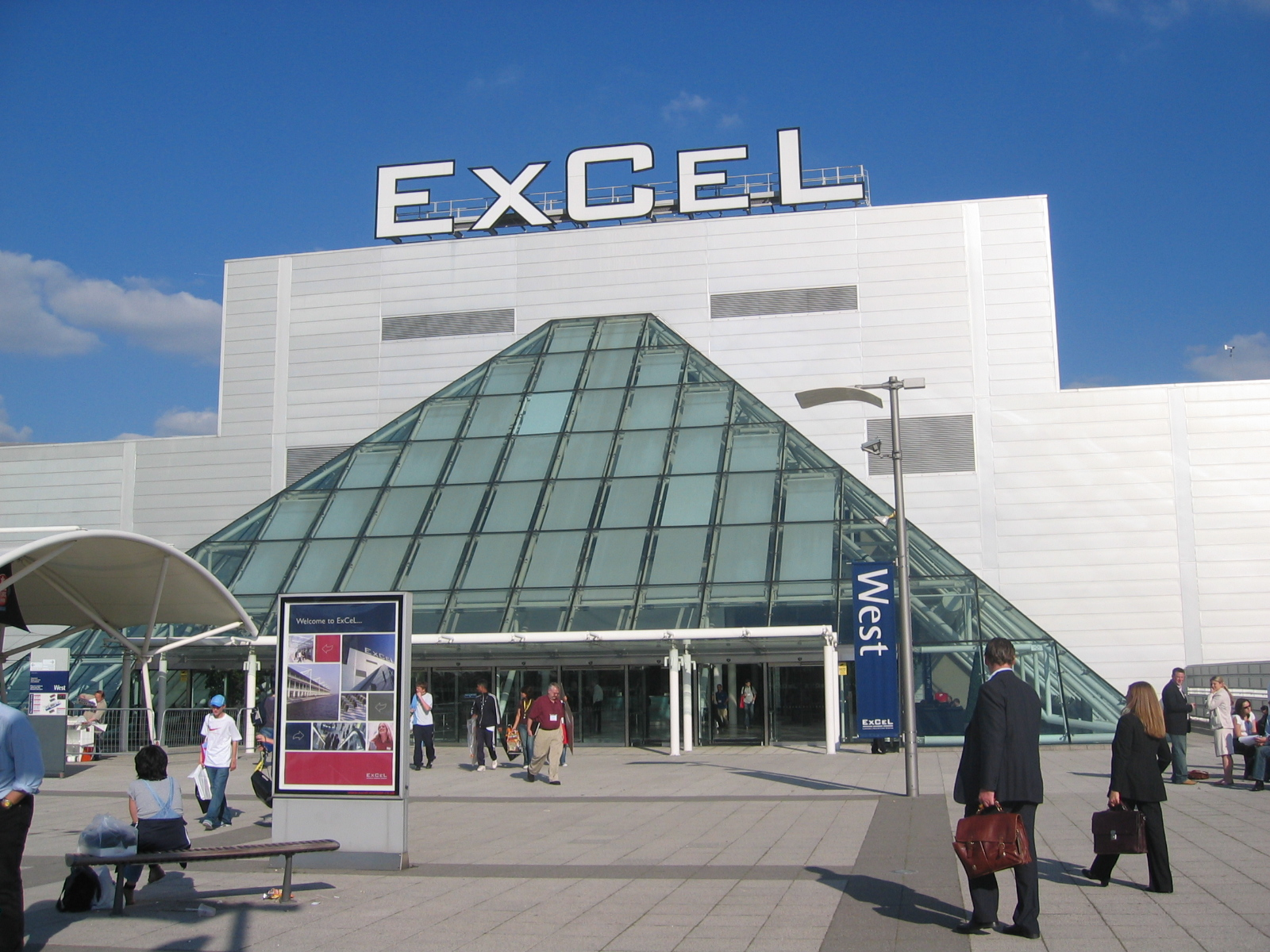
- ExCel Exhibition Centre
- Venue: ExCeL Exhibition Centre
- Date: 3 August 2012
- Competitors: 32 from 32 nations

Medalists
1st place, gold medalist(s)		Teddy Riner	France
2nd place, silver medalist(s)		Aleksandr Mikhailine	Russia
3rd place, bronze medalist(s)		Rafael Silva	Brazil
3rd place, bronze medalist(s)		Andreas Tölzer	Germany

The Men's +100 kg competition in judo at the 2012 Summer Olympics in London, United Kingdom, took place at ExCeL London between 28 July and 3 August.

The gold and silver medals were determined by a single-elimination tournament, with the winner of the final taking gold and the loser receiving silver. Judo events awarded two bronze medals. Quarterfinal losers competed in a repechage match for the right to face a semifinal loser for a bronze medal (that is, the judokas defeated in quarterfinals A and B competed against each other, with the winner of that match facing the semifinal loser from the other half of the bracket).

== Schedule ==
All times are British Summer Time (UTC+1)

Date	Time	Round
Friday, 3 August 2012	09:30; 14:00; 16:10	Qualifications; Semifinals; Final

== Results ==
=== Finals ===
Semi-finals
Teddy Riner (FRA)	010
Kim Sung-Min (KOR)	0003
Andreas Tölzer (GER)	0002
Aleksandr Mikhailine (RUS)	0011

Final
Teddy Riner (FRA)	0101
Aleksandr Mikhailine (RUS)	0003

=== Repechages ===
Repechage		Bronze medal
Óscar Brayson (CUB)	000
Ihar Makarau (BLR)	1001	Ihar Makarau (BLR)	0001
		Andreas Tölzer (GER)	100

Repechage		Bronze medal
Barna Bor (HUN)	0001
Rafael Silva (BRA)	0001	Rafael Silva (BRA)	0011
		Kim Sung-Min (KOR)	0002

=== Pool A ===
First Round		Second Round		Quarterfinals
T Riner (FRA)	010
J Wojnarowicz (POL)	0003	T Riner (FRA)	101
F Jaballah (TUN)	001	F Jaballah (TUN)	0002
Y Shynkeyev (KAZ)	0001			T Riner (FRA)	100
O Brayson (CUB)	100			O Brayson (CUB)	0001
M Padar (EST)	0001	O Brayson (CUB)	100
R Blas, Jr. (GUM)	101	R Blas, Jr. (GUM)	0001
F Keita (GUI)	0002

=== Pool B ===
First Round		Second Round		Quarterfinals
I El Shehaby (EGY)	0002
I Makarau (BLR)	0021	I Makarau (BLR)	0011
D Kamikawa (JPN)	100	D Kamikawa (JPN)	0001
D Castillo (GUA)	000			I Makarau (BLR)	0002
S-M Kim (KOR)	100			S-M Kim (KOR)	0011
T Hoshina (PHI)	000	S-M Kim (KOR)	0020
M Ceraj (SLO)	0021	M Ceraj (SLO)	0001
S Bondarenko (UKR)	0002

=== Pool C ===
First Round		Second Round		Quarterfinals
A Tölzer (GER)	0201
A Okruashvili (GEO)	0003	A Tölzer (GER)	1000
V Simionescu (ROU)	1001	V Simionescu (ROU)	0000
I Krakovetskii (KGZ)	0001			A Tölzer (GER)	0011
B Bor (HUN)	001			B Bor (HUN)	0002
L Verbij (NED)	0002	B Bor (HUN)	100
M Roudaki (IRI)	000	EM Malki (MAR)	000
EM Malki (MAR)	100

=== Pool D ===
First Round		Second Round		Quarterfinals
R Silva (BRA)	100
T Jónsson (ISL)	000	R Silva (BRA)	1001
N Fiakaifonu (VAN)	000	M Paškevičius (LTU)	0001
M Paškevičius (LTU)	100			R Silva (BRA)	0001
A Mikhailine (RUS)	100			A Mikhailine (RUS)	0001
C Mandembo (COD)	000	A Mikhailine (RUS)	0011
C Sherrington (GBR)	100	C Sherrington (GBR)	0001
J Andrewartha (AUS)	000
