= 2004 European Judo Open Championships =

Judo competition

2004 Judo European Judo Open Championships
- Location: Budapest, Hungary
- Date: 4 December 2004

Competition at external databases
- Links: JudoInside

The 2004 European Judo Open Championships were the 1st edition of the European Judo Open Championships, and were held in Budapest, Hungary on 4 December 2004.

The European Judo Open Championships was staged because the open class event had been dropped from the European Judo Championships program from 2004. Unlike the regular European Judo Championships, several competitors from each country are allowed to enter.

== Results ==
=== Men ===
Position	Judoka	Country
1.	Matthieu Bataille	France
2.	Georgi Kizilashvili	Georgia
3.	Antal Kovács	Hungary
3.	György Kosztolánczy	Hungary
5.	Gadzhimurad Muslimov	Russia
5.	Alexander Davitashvili	Georgia
5.	Suren Balachinskyi	Russia
5.	Vladimir Galkine	Russia

=== Women ===
Position	Judoka	Country
1.	Anne-Sophie Mondière	France
2.	Marina Prokofieva	Ukraine
3.	Eva Bisseni	France
3.	Sédrine Portet	France
5.	Tea Donguzashvili	Russia
5.	Urszula Sadkowska	Poland
5.	Irina Rodina	Russia
5.	Anaid Mkhitaryan	Russia
