= Stanislav Bondarenko =

Ukrainian judoka (born 1987)

Personal information
- Born: 29 August 1987 (age 38)
- Occupation: Judoka

Sport
- Country: Ukraine
- Sport: Judo
- Weight class: +100 kg

Achievements and titles
- Olympic Games: R32 (2012)
- World Champ.: R16 (2009, 2010, 2017)
- European Champ.: 5th (2011)
Medal record
Men's judo
Representing Ukraine
IJF Grand Slam
Bronze medal – third place	2010 Moscow	+100 kg
Bronze medal – third place	2015 Tokyo	+100 kg
Bronze medal – third place	2017 Baku	+100 kg
IJF Grand Prix
Gold medal – first place	2016 Budapest	+100 kg
Silver medal – second place	2017 Tbilisi	+100 kg
Bronze medal – third place	2010 Rotterdam	+100 kg
Bronze medal – third place	2010 Abu Dhabi	+100 kg
Bronze medal – third place	2011 Baku	+100 kg
Bronze medal – third place	2013 Jeju	+100 kg
Bronze medal – third place	2014 Tbilisi	+100 kg
Bronze medal – third place	2014 Samsun	+100 kg
Bronze medal – third place	2016 Zagreb	+100 kg
European U23 Championships
Silver medal – second place	2008 Zagreb	+100 kg
Bronze medal – third place	2007 Salzburg	+100 kg
Bronze medal – third place	2009 Antalya	+100 kg
World Juniors Championships
Silver medal – second place	2006 Santo Domingo	+100 kg

Profile at external databases
- IJF: 676
- JudoInside.com: 28585
- Updated on 24 November 2022

Stanislav Bondarenko (Ukrainian: Станіслав Валерійович Бондаренко, born 29 August 1987 in Zaporizhzhia, Ukrainian SSR, Soviet Union) is a Ukrainian retired judoka. He competed at the 2012 Summer Olympics in the +100 kg event, losing to Matjaž Ceraj in the first round.

Ukraine judoka Stanislav Bondarenko fought the World Junior Championships final in 2006. He was European Open Team Champion in 2011 with Ukraine. In 2015 he won bronze at the Grand Slam in Tokyo. He won the Grand Prix in Budapest in 2016 and took a bronze medal at the Grand Prix in Zagreb in 2016. He won a bronze medal at the Grand Slam in Baku in 2017. He finished with silver at the Grand Prix in Tbilisi in 2017. He took bronze at the Sambo World Championships in Sochi in 2017.
