= 2007 European Judo Open Championships =

Judo competition

2007 Judo European Judo Open Championships
- Location: Warsaw, Poland
- Date: 1 December 2007

Competition at external databases
- Links: EJU • JudoInside

The 2007 European Judo Open Championships were the 4th edition of the European Judo Open Championships, and were held in Warsaw, Poland on 1 December 2007.

The European Judo Open Championships are staged because the open class event had been dropped from the European Judo Championships program from 2004. Unlike the regular European Judo Championships, several competitors from each country are allowed to enter.

== Results ==
=== Men ===
Position	Judoka	Country
1.	Aleksandr Mikhailine	Russia
2.	Ihar Makarau	Belarus
3.	Martin Padar	Estonia
3.	Przemysław Matyjaszek	Poland
5.	Grzegorz Eitel	Poland
5.	Maxim Bryanov	Russia
7.	Paweł Smoliniec	Poland
7.	Georgi Kizilashvili	Georgia

=== Women ===
Position	Judoka	Country
1.	Elena Ivashchenko	Russia
2.	Anaid Mkhitaryan	Russia
3.	Ketty Mathe	France
3.	Małgorzata Górnicka	Poland
5.	Marzena Makuła	Poland
5.	Marina Dibrova	Russia
7.	Ekaterina Sheremetova	Russia
7.	Magdalena Kozioł	Poland
