= György Kosztolánczy (judoka) =

Hungarian judoka (born 1977)

Medal record

Men's judo

European Championships
Bronze medal – third place	2004 Budapest	Open

György Kosztolánczy (born 24 May 1977) is a Hungarian judoka.

== Achievements ==
Year	Tournament	Place	Weight class
2004	European Open Championships	3rd	Open class
2003	Universiade	1st	Half heavyweight (100 kg)
2002	European Judo Championships	5th	Open class
