= 2005 European Judo Open Championships =

Judo competition

2005 Judo European Judo Open Championships
- Location: Moscow, Russia
- Date: 3 December 2005

Competition at external databases
- Links: JudoInside

The 2005 European Judo Open Championships were the 2nd edition of the European Judo Open Championships, and were held in Moscow, Russia on 3 December 2005.

The European Judo Open Championships was staged because the open class event had been dropped from the European Judo Championships program from 2004. Unlike the regular European Judo Championships, several competitors from each country are allowed to enter.

== Results ==
=== Men ===
Position	Judoka	Country
1.	Tamerlan Tmenov	Russia
2.	Aleksandr Mikhailine	Russia
3.	Matthieu Bataille	France
3.	Martin Padar	Estonia
5.	Lasha Gujejiani	Georgia
5.	Pierre Robin	France
7.	Yury Rybak	Belarus
7.	Maxim Bryanov	Russia

=== Women ===
Position	Judoka	Country
1.	Anne-Sophie Mondière	France
2.	Tea Donguzashvili	Russia
3.	Natalia Sokolova	Russia
3.	Małgorzata Górnicka	Poland
5.	Anna Brazhko	Ukraine
5.	Sandra Köppen	Germany
7.	Verena Birndorfer	Germany
7.	Marina Prokofieva	Ukraine
