= Wojnarowicz =

Wojnarowicz is a Polish surname. Nowadays it is gender-neutral, although in the past the feminine forms Wojnarowiczówna and Wojnarowiczowa existed.

The surname may refer to

- David Wojnarowicz (1954–1992), American painter, photographer, writer, filmmaker and performance artist
- Janusz Wojnarowicz (born 1980), Polish judoka
