= 2006 European Judo Open Championships =

Judo competition

2006 Judo European Judo Open Championships
- Location: Novi Sad, Serbia
- Date: 9 December 2006

Competition at external databases
- Links: JudoInside

The 2006 European Judo Open Championships were the 3rd edition of the European Judo Open Championships, and were held in Novi Sad, Serbia on 9 December 2006.

The European Judo Open Championships was staged because the open class event had been dropped from the European Judo Championships program from 2004. Unlike the regular European Judo Championships, several competitors from each country are allowed to enter.

== Results ==
=== Men ===
| Position | Judoka | Country |
|---|---|---|
| 1. | Aleksandr Mikhailine | Russia |
| 2. | Yevgen Sotnikov | Ukraine |
| 3. | Martin Padar | Estonia |
| 3. | Adam Okroashvili | Georgia |
| 5. | Dennis van der Geest | Netherlands |
| 5. | Matthieu Bataille | France |
| 7. | Marko Radulović | Serbia |
| 7. | Grzegorz Eitel | Poland |

=== Women ===
| Position | Judoka | Country |
|---|---|---|
| 1. | Tea Donguzashvili | Russia |
| 2. | Natalia Sokolova | Russia |
| 3. | Elena Ivashchenko | Russia |
| 3. | Yuliya Barysik | Belarus |
| 5. | Radmila Perišić | Serbia |
| 5. | Małgorzata Górnicka | Poland |
| 7. | Irina Rodina | Russia |
| 7. | Anastasia Matrosova | Ukraine |
