= Keiji Suzuki =

Japanese judoka and scholar (born 1980)

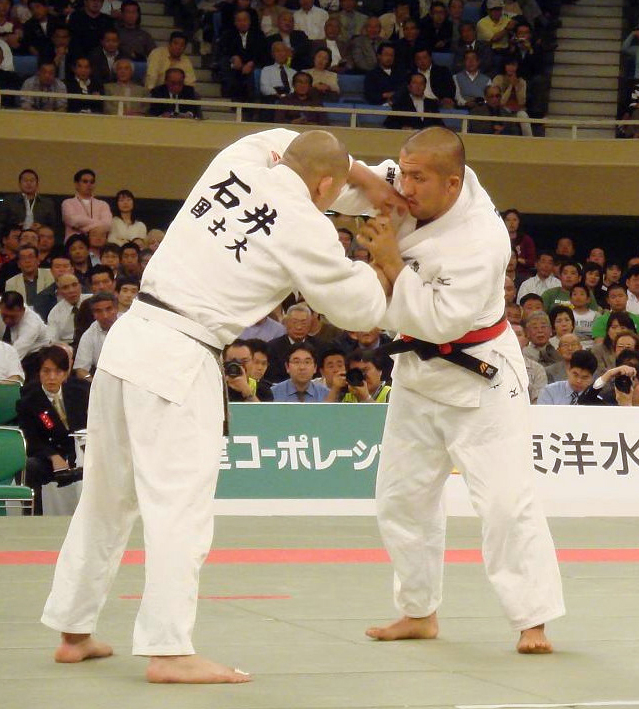
- Keiji Suzuki (right) competing in the finals of the 2007 All-Japan Judo Championships

Personal information
- Nationality: Japanese
- Born: 3 June 1980 (age 46) Jōsō, Ibaraki, Japan
- Education: Kokushikan University
- Occupation: Judoka
- Height: 1.85 m (6 ft 1 in)

Sport
- Country: Japan
- Sport: Judo
- Weight class: –100 kg, +100 kg, Open
- Rank: 7th dan black belt
- Coached by: Koichi Iwabuchi; Hitoshi Saito
- Kumite: Left
- Position: Heisei Kanzai

Achievements and titles
- Olympic Games: (gold) (2004)
- World Champ.: (gold) (2003, 2005)
- Asian Champ.: (gold) (2002)
Medal record
Men's judo
Representing Japan
Olympic Games
Gold medal – first place	2004 Athens	+100 kg
World Championships
Gold medal – first place	2003 Osaka	Open
Gold medal – first place	2005 Cairo	‍–‍100 kg
Bronze medal – third place	2010 Tokyo	Open
Bronze medal – third place	2011 Tyumen	Open
Asian Games
Gold medal – first place	2002 Busan	‍–‍100 kg
Asian Championships
Silver medal – second place	2004 Almaty	+100 kg
Silver medal – second place	2009 Taipei	+100 kg
World Masters
Silver medal – second place	2010 Suwon	+100 kg
Bronze medal – third place	2011 Baku	+100 kg
IJF Grand Slam
Silver medal – second place	2009 Tokyo	+100 kg
Bronze medal – third place	2010 Rio de Janeiro	+100 kg
IJF Grand Prix
Gold medal – first place	2009 Qingdao	+100 kg
Gold medal – first place	2010 Tunis	+100 kg
Silver medal – second place	2010 Düsseldorf	+100 kg
Silver medal – second place	2011 Düsseldorf	+100 kg
Bronze medal – third place	2012 Düsseldorf	+100 kg
World Juniors Championships
Gold medal – first place	1998 Cali	‍–‍100 kg
Summer Universiade
Gold medal – first place	2001 Beijing	‍–‍100 kg

Profile at external databases
- IJF: 1777
- JudoInside.com: 6559
- Updated on 30 May 2023

Keiji Suzuki (鈴木桂治, Suzuki Keiji; born 3 June 1980 in Jōsō, Ibaraki) is a Japanese judoka and sports scientist.

== Career ==
Suzuki won the Olympic gold medal in the heavyweight (+100 kg) division in 2004. He is also a two-time world champion.

Suzuki is noted for being a remarkably small judoka in the heavyweight division; he also regularly competed in the light-heavyweight (‍–‍100 kg) class.

Suzuki is known as having some of the best Ashi-waza of all heavyweights.

Suzuki was eliminated in the first round of the +100 kg event at the 2010 World Championships in Yoyogi, Japan, via ippon by Janusz Wojnarowicz of Poland.

Suzuki dislocated his shoulder in the semi-finals of the 2012 All-Japan Judo Championships and subsequently announced his retirement as he was not selected to represent Japan at the London 2012 Olympic Games.

Suzuki was appointed Men's Heavyweight Coach for the Japanese team by the new head coach, his friend and former rival Kosei Inoue.

He replaced Inoue as head coach of the national team in 2021.
