= Nynke Klopstra =

Dutch judoka

Personal information
- Born: 5 April 1973 (age 53) Giekerk, Friesland, Netherlands
- Occupation: Judoka

Sport
- Country: Netherlands
- Sport: Judo
- Weight class: ‍–‍48 kg

Achievements and titles
- World Champ.: 9th (1999)
- European Champ.: (bronze) (2004)
Medal record
Women's judo
Representing the Netherlands
European Championships
Bronze medal – third place	2004 Bucharest	‍–‍48 kg

Profile at external databases
- IJF: 58596
- JudoInside.com: 1438
- Updated on 19 November 2022

Nynke Klopstra (pronounced [ˈniŋkə ˈklɔpstraː]; born 5 April 1973) is a Dutch former judoka. She won a bronze medal at the 2004 European Judo Championships in Budapest in the ‍–‍48 kg class. In this class she won six consecutive Dutch National Championships from 1998 until 2003. After her success at the European Championships she suffered from several injuries and decided to end her career on 30 October 2006.

== Achievements ==
(gold) 1998 Dutch Nationals (‍–‍48 kg), Den Bosch
(gold) 1999 Dutch Nationals (‍–‍48 kg), Den Bosch
(gold) 2000 Dutch Nationals (‍–‍48 kg), Den Bosch
(gold) 2001 Dutch Nationals (‍–‍48 kg), Den Bosch
(gold) 2002 Dutch Nationals (‍–‍48 kg), Amsterdam
(gold) 2003 Dutch Nationals (‍–‍48 kg), Amsterdam
(bronze) 2004 Judo Championships (‍–‍48 kg), Budapest
