= Antal Kovács =

Hungarian judoka (born 1972)

Personal information
- Born: 28 May 1972 (age 54) Paks, Tolna, Hungary
- Occupation: Judoka

Sport
- Country: Hungary
- Sport: Judo
- Weight class: –95 kg, –100 kg

Achievements and titles
- Olympic Games: (gold) (1992)
- World Champ.: (1993)
- European Champ.: (silver) (2004)
Medal record
Men's judo
Representing Hungary
Olympic Games
Gold medal – first place	1992 Barcelona	‍–‍95 kg
World Championships
Gold medal – first place	1993 Hamilton	‍–‍95 kg
Silver medal – second place	2001 Munich	‍–‍100 kg
European Championships
Silver medal – second place	2004 Bucharest	‍–‍100 kg
Bronze medal – third place	1992 Paris	‍–‍95 kg
Bronze medal – third place	1993 Athens	‍–‍95 kg
Bronze medal – third place	2002 Maribor	‍–‍100 kg
Bronze medal – third place	2003 Düsseldorf	‍–‍100 kg
Bronze medal – third place	2004 Budapest	Open
World Juniors Championships
Silver medal – second place	1992 Buenos Aires	‍–‍95 kg
European Junior Championships
Bronze medal – third place	1991 Pieksämäki	‍–‍95 kg

Profile at external databases
- IJF: 41319
- JudoInside.com: 2705
- Updated on 5 June 2023

Antal Kovács (born 28 May 1972 in Paks, Tolna) is a Hungarian judoka.

He was elected Hungarian Sportsman of The Year in 1993 for winning a gold medal at that year's World Judo Championships.

== Achievements ==
Year	Tournament	Place	Weight class
2004	European Judo Championships	2nd	Half heavyweight (100 kg)
2004	European Open Championships	3rd	Open class
2003	European Judo Championships	3rd	Half heavyweight (100 kg)
2002	European Judo Championships	3rd	Half heavyweight (100 kg)
2001	World Judo Championships	2nd	Half heavyweight (100 kg)
1996	Olympic Games	5th	Half heavyweight (95 kg)
1996	European Judo Championships	7th	Half heavyweight (95 kg)
1995	European Judo Championships	5th	Half heavyweight (95 kg)
1993	World Judo Championships	1st	Half heavyweight (95 kg)
1993	European Judo Championships	3rd	Half heavyweight (95 kg)
1992	Olympic Games	1st	Half heavyweight (95 kg)
1992	European Judo Championships	3rd	Half heavyweight (95 kg)

Awards
Preceded by Tamás Darnyi	Hungarian Sportsman of The Year; 1993	Succeeded by Norbert Rózsa
