= Michele Monti =

Italian judoka

Personal information
- Born: 5 June 1970
- Died: 8 December 2018 (aged 48)
- Occupation: Judoka

Sport
- Country: Italy
- Sport: Judo
- Weight class: ‍–‍86 kg, ‍–‍100 kg

Achievements and titles
- Olympic Games: R16 (2004)
- World Champ.: (bronze) (1997)
- European Champ.: (bronze) (2004)
Medal record
Men's judo
Representing Italy
World Championships
Bronze medal – third place	1997 Paris	‍–‍86 kg
European Championships
Bronze medal – third place	2004 Bucharest	‍–‍100 kg
Mediterranean Games
Gold medal – first place	1997 Bari	‍–‍86 kg
Bronze medal – third place	2001 Tunis	‍–‍100 kg

Profile at external databases
- IJF: 53047
- JudoInside.com: 450
- Updated on 17 November 2022

Michele Monti (5 June 1970 – 8 December 2018) was an Italian judoka. He competed at the 2000 Summer Olympics and the 2004 Summer Olympics.

== Achievements ==
Year	Tournament	Place	Weight class
2005	European Judo Championships	7th	Half heavyweight (100 kg)
2004	European Judo Championships	3rd	Half heavyweight (100 kg)
2003	World Judo Championships	5th	Half heavyweight (100 kg)
2001	Mediterranean Games	3rd	Half heavyweight (100 kg)
1997	World Judo Championships	3rd	Middleweight (86 kg)
1997	Mediterranean Games	1st	Middleweight (86 kg)
