= Tamerlan Tmenov =

Russian judoka (born 1977)

Personal information
- Born: 27 July 1977 (age 48) Vladikavkaz, Soviet Union
- Occupation: Judoka

Sport
- Country: Russia
- Sport: Judo
- Weight class: +100 kg

Achievements and titles
- Olympic Games: (silver) (2004)
- World Champ.: (silver) (2005, 2007)
- European Champ.: (gold) (1998, 1999, 2001, 2002, 2003, 2005, 2008)
Medal record
Men's judo
Representing Russia
Olympic Games
Silver medal – second place	2004 Athens	+100 kg
Bronze medal – third place	2000 Sydney	+100 kg
World Championships
Silver medal – second place	2005 Cairo	Open
Silver medal – second place	2007 Rio de Janeiro	+100 kg
Bronze medal – third place	1997 Paris	+95 kg
Bronze medal – third place	2003 Osaka	+100 kg
European Championships
Gold medal – first place	1998 Oviedo	+100 kg
Gold medal – first place	1999 Bratislava	+100 kg
Gold medal – first place	2001 Paris	+100 kg
Gold medal – first place	2002 Maribor	+100 kg
Gold medal – first place	2003 Düsseldorf	+100 kg
Gold medal – first place	2005 Moscow	Open
Gold medal – first place	2008 Lisbon	+100 kg
Silver medal – second place	2000 Wrocław	+100 kg
Bronze medal – third place	2004 Bucharest	+100 kg
Bronze medal – third place	2006 Tampere	+100 kg
World Juniors Championships
Gold medal – first place	1996 Porto	‍–‍95 kg
European Junior Championships
Gold medal – first place	1995 Valladolid	‍–‍95 kg

Profile at external databases
- IJF: 426
- JudoInside.com: 605
- Updated on 30 May 2023

Tamerlan Ruslanovich Tmenov (Russian: Тамерлан Русланович Тменов; born 27 July 1977) is a Russian judoka. He is a 2004 Olympic silver medalist, 2000 Olympic bronze medalist, and seven-time European Champion from 1998 to 2008. Tmenov is the vice president of the Russian Judo Federation.

== Achievements ==
Year	Tournament	Place	Weight class
2008	Olympic Games	5th	Heavyweight (+100 kg)
2008	European Championships	1st	Heavyweight (+100 kg)
2007	World Judo Championships	2nd	Heavyweight (+100 kg)
2006	European Judo Championships	3rd	Heavyweight (+100 kg)
2005	World Judo Championships	2nd	Open class
2005	European Open Championships	1st	Open class
2004	Olympic Games	2nd	Heavyweight (+100 kg)
2004	European Judo Championships	3rd	Heavyweight (+100 kg)
2003	World Judo Championships	3rd	Heavyweight (+100 kg)
2003	European Judo Championships	1st	Heavyweight (+100 kg)
2002	European Judo Championships	1st	Heavyweight (+100 kg)
2001	European Judo Championships	1st	Heavyweight (+100 kg)
2000	European Judo Championships	2nd	Heavyweight (+100 kg)
1999	World Judo Championships	7th	Heavyweight (+100 kg)
1999	European Judo Championships	1st	Heavyweight (+100 kg)
1998	European Judo Championships	1st	Heavyweight (+100 kg)
1997	World Judo Championships	3rd	Heavyweight (+100 kg)
