= Maryna Prokofyeva =

Ukrainian judoka (born 1982)

Personal information
- Born: 4 February 1982 (age 44) Zhdanov, Donetsk, Ukrainian SSR, Soviet Union
- Occupation: Judoka

Sport
- Country: Ukraine
- Sport: Judo
- Weight class: +78 kg

Achievements and titles
- Olympic Games: 5th (2004)
- World Champ.: 7th (2009)
- European Champ.: (gold) (2004)
Medal record
Women's judo
Representing Ukraine
European Championships
Gold medal – first place	2004 Bucharest	+78 kg
Silver medal – second place	2004 Budapest	Open
Bronze medal – third place	2005 Rotterdam	+78 kg
IJF Grand Prix
Silver medal – second place	2009 Tunis	+78 kg
Silver medal – second place	2009 Abu Dhabi	+78 kg
European U23 Championships
Bronze medal – third place	2004 Ljubljana	+78 kg
World Juniors Championships
Bronze medal – third place	2000 Nabeul	+78 kg
European Junior Championships
Silver medal – second place	2001 Budapest	+78 kg
Summer Universiade
Bronze medal – third place	2001 Beijing	+78 kg
Bronze medal – third place	2006 Suwon	+78 kg

Profile at external databases
- IJF: 3245
- JudoInside.com: 6716
- Updated on 9 May 2024

Maryna Prokofyeva (born 4 February 1982) is a Ukrainian judoka.

Prokofyeva finished in joint fifth place in the heavyweight (+78 kg) division at the 2004 Summer Olympics, having lost the bronze medal match to Sun Fuming of China.

== Achievements ==
Year	Tournament	Place	Weight class
2009	European Championships	7th	Heavyweight (+78 kg)
2007	European Championships	5th	Heavyweight (+78 kg)
2006	European Championships	5th	Heavyweight (+78 kg)
2005	European Championships	3rd	Heavyweight (+78 kg)
2005	European Open Championships	7th	Open class
2004	Olympic Games	5th	Heavyweight (+78 kg)
2004	European Championships	5th	Heavyweight (+78 kg)
2004	European Open Championships	2nd	Open class
2003	European Championships	7th	Heavyweight (+78 kg)
