= Katrin Beinroth =

German judoka (1981–2020)

Personal information
- Born: 15 September 1981
- Died: 23 June 2020 (aged 38)
- Occupation: Judoka

Sport
- Country: Germany
- Sport: Judo
- Weight class: +78 kg

Achievements and titles
- World Champ.: 5th (2008)
- European Champ.: (gold) (2003)
Medal record
Women's judo
Representing Germany
European Championships
Gold medal – first place	2003 Düsseldorf	Open
Bronze medal – third place	2004 Bucharest	+78 kg
Bronze medal – third place	2005 Rotterdam	+78 kg
European Junior Championships
Silver medal – second place	1999 Rome	+78 kg

Profile at external databases
- IJF: 6406
- JudoInside.com: 209
- Updated on 17 November 2022

Katrin Beinroth (West Germany, 15 September 1981 – 26 June 2020) was a German judoka.

== Achievements ==
Year	Tournament	Place	Weight class
2005	European Championships	3rd	Heavyweight (+78 kg)
2004	European Championships	3rd	Heavyweight (+78 kg)
2003	European Championships	1st	Open class
