= 2006 World Team Judo Championships – Men's team =

Judo competition

Judo Men's team at the 2006 World Team Judo Championships
- Venue: Bercy
- Location: Paris, France
- Dates: 17 September 2006

Medalists
gold medal	Georgia (1st title)
silver medal	Russia
bronze medal	South Korea
bronze medal	France

Competition at external databases
- Links: JudoInside

The men's team competition at the 2006 World Team Judo Championships was held on 17 September at the Bercy in Paris, France.

== Results ==
Round of 16
Brazil	2
Russia	4
France	7
Oceania	0
Egypt	0
Georgia	6
Hungary	1
South Korea	5
Israel	4
Cuba	3

Quarter-finals
Russia	3
Netherlands	2
Japan	2
France	4
Ukraine	2
Georgia	4
South Korea	6
Israel	1

Semi-finals
Russia	4
France	3
Georgia	4
South Korea	3

Final
Russia	3
Georgia	4

=== Repechage ===
Repechage 1
Brazil	4
Netherlands	3
Oceania	0
Japan	7

Repechage 2
Brazil	1
Japan	4

Third place
Japan	2
South Korea	2

Repechage 1
Egypt	1
Ukraine	6
Hungary	5
Israel	2

Repechage 2
Ukraine	4
Hungary	2

Third place
Ukraine	1
France	6
