= 2010 Judo Grand Slam Tokyo =

Judo competition

Judo 2010 Judo Grand Slam Tokyo
- Location: Tokyo, Japan
- Dates: 11–13 December 2010
- Competitors: 361 from 53 nations

Competition at external databases
- Links: IJF • EJU • JudoInside

The 2010 Judo Grand Slam Tokyo was held in Tokyo, Japan, from 11 to 13 December 2010.

== Medal summary ==
=== Men's events ===
Event	Gold	Silver	Bronze
Extra-lightweight (−60 kg)	Hirofumi Yamamoto (JPN)	Toru Shishime (JPN)	Shinji Kido (JPN)
Extra-lightweight (−60 kg)	Hirofumi Yamamoto (JPN)	Toru Shishime (JPN)	Takeshi Matsuki (JPN)
Half-lightweight (−66 kg)	Masaaki Fukuoka (JPN)	Musa Mogushkov (RUS)	Masashi Ebinuma (JPN)
Half-lightweight (−66 kg)	Masaaki Fukuoka (JPN)	Musa Mogushkov (RUS)	Khashbaataryn Tsagaanbaatar (MGL)
Lightweight (−73 kg)	Riki Nakaya (JPN)	Yuki Nishiyama (JPN)	Nicholas Tritton (CAN)
Lightweight (−73 kg)	Riki Nakaya (JPN)	Yuki Nishiyama (JPN)	Dirk Van Tichelt (BEL)
Half-middleweight (−81 kg)	Takahiro Nakai (JPN)	Masahiro Takamatsu (JPN)	Leandro Guilheiro (BRA)
Half-middleweight (−81 kg)	Takahiro Nakai (JPN)	Masahiro Takamatsu (JPN)	Euan Burton (GBR)
Middleweight (−90 kg)	Masashi Nishiyama (JPN)	Tiago Camilo (BRA)	Dilshod Choriev (UZB)
Middleweight (−90 kg)	Masashi Nishiyama (JPN)	Tiago Camilo (BRA)	Khurshid Nabiev (UZB)
Half-heavyweight (−100 kg)	Takamasa Anai (JPN)	Ariel Ze'evi (ISR)	Tagir Khaybulaev (RUS)
Half-heavyweight (−100 kg)	Takamasa Anai (JPN)	Ariel Ze'evi (ISR)	Maxim Rakov (KAZ)
Heavyweight (+100 kg)	Kim Sung-min (KOR)	Kazuhiko Takahashi (JPN)	Daiki Kamikawa (JPN)
Heavyweight (+100 kg)	Kim Sung-min (KOR)	Kazuhiko Takahashi (JPN)	Andreas Tölzer (GER)

=== Women's events ===
Event	Gold	Silver	Bronze
Extra-lightweight (−48 kg)	Tomoko Fukumi (JPN)	Kaori Kondo (JPN)	Shoko Ibe (JPN)
Extra-lightweight (−48 kg)	Tomoko Fukumi (JPN)	Kaori Kondo (JPN)	Sarah Menezes (BRA)
Half-lightweight (−52 kg)	Yuka Nishida (JPN)	Anzu Yamamoto (JPN)	Laura Gómez (ESP)
Half-lightweight (−52 kg)	Yuka Nishida (JPN)	Anzu Yamamoto (JPN)	Chiho Kagaya (JPN)
Lightweight (−57 kg)	Kaori Matsumoto (JPN)	Nozomi Hirai (JPN)	Kifayat Gasimova (AZE)
Lightweight (−57 kg)	Kaori Matsumoto (JPN)	Nozomi Hirai (JPN)	Lien Chen-ling (TPE)
Half-middleweight (−63 kg)	Clarisse Agbegnenou (FRA)	Gévrise Émane (FRA)	Joung Da-woon (KOR)
Half-middleweight (−63 kg)	Clarisse Agbegnenou (FRA)	Gévrise Émane (FRA)	Elisabeth Willeboordse (NED)
Middleweight (−70 kg)	Haruka Tachimoto (JPN)	Edith Bosch (NED)	Hwang Ye-sul (KOR)
Middleweight (−70 kg)	Haruka Tachimoto (JPN)	Edith Bosch (NED)	Raša Sraka (SLO)
Half-heavyweight (−78 kg)	Audrey Tcheuméo (FRA)	Catherine Jacques (BEL)	Akari Ogata (JPN)
Half-heavyweight (−78 kg)	Audrey Tcheuméo (FRA)	Catherine Jacques (BEL)	Yang Xiuli (CHN)
Heavyweight (+78 kg)	Megumi Tachimoto (JPN)	Idalys Ortiz (CUB)	Anne-Sophie Mondière (FRA)
Heavyweight (+78 kg)	Megumi Tachimoto (JPN)	Idalys Ortiz (CUB)	Kanae Yamabe (JPN)

Source Results

=== Medal table ===
* Host nation (Japan)

Rank	Nation	Gold	Silver	Bronze	Total
1	Japan (JPN)*	11	7	8	26
2	France (FRA)	2	1	1	4
3	South Korea (KOR)	1	0	2	3
4	Brazil (BRA)	0	1	2	3
5	Belgium (BEL)	0	1	1	2
5	Netherlands (NED)	0	1	1	2
5	Russia (RUS)	0	1	1	2
8	Cuba (CUB)	0	1	0	1
8	Israel (ISR)	0	1	0	1
10	Uzbekistan (UZB)	0	0	2	2
11	Azerbaijan (AZE)	0	0	1	1
11	Canada (CAN)	0	0	1	1
11	China (CHN)	0	0	1	1
11	Chinese Taipei (TPE)	0	0	1	1
11	Germany (GER)	0	0	1	1
11	Great Britain (GBR)	0	0	1	1
11	Kazakhstan (KAZ)	0	0	1	1
11	Mongolia (MGL)	0	0	1	1
11	Slovenia (SLO)	0	0	1	1
11	Spain (ESP)	0	0	1	1
Totals (20 entries)		14	14	28	56
