= 2014 Judo Grand Prix Samsun =

Judo competition

Judo 2014 Judo Grand Prix Samsun
- Location: Samsun, Turkey
- Dates: 28–30 March 2014
- Competitors: 351 from 44 nations

Competition at external databases
- Links: IJF • EJU • JudoInside

The 2014 Judo Grand Prix Samsun was held in Samsun, Turkey from 28 to 30 March 2014.

== Medal summary ==
=== Men's events ===
Event	Gold	Silver	Bronze
Extra-lightweight (−60 kg)	Beslan Mudranov (RUS)	Yeldos Smetov (KAZ)	Robert Mshvidobadze (RUS)
Extra-lightweight (−60 kg)	Beslan Mudranov (RUS)	Yeldos Smetov (KAZ)	Adrien Raymond (FRA)
Half-lightweight (−66 kg)	David Larose (FRA)	Loïc Korval (FRA)	Charles Chibana (BRA)
Half-lightweight (−66 kg)	David Larose (FRA)	Loïc Korval (FRA)	Colin Oates (GBR)
Lightweight (−73 kg)	Christopher Völk (GER)	Rustam Orujov (AZE)	Miklós Ungvári (HUN)
Lightweight (−73 kg)	Christopher Völk (GER)	Rustam Orujov (AZE)	Hasan Vanlıoğlu (TUR)
Half-middleweight (−81 kg)	Sven Maresch (GER)	Alexander Wieczerzak (GER)	Valeriu Duminică (MDA)
Half-middleweight (−81 kg)	Sven Maresch (GER)	Alexander Wieczerzak (GER)	Attila Ungvári (HUN)
Middleweight (−90 kg)	Beka Gviniashvili (GEO)	Marc Odenthal (GER)	Alexandre Iddir (FRA)
Middleweight (−90 kg)	Beka Gviniashvili (GEO)	Marc Odenthal (GER)	Magomed Magomedov (RUS)
Half-heavyweight (−100 kg)	Cyrille Maret (FRA)	Adlan Bisultanov (RUS)	Karl-Richard Frey (GER)
Half-heavyweight (−100 kg)	Cyrille Maret (FRA)	Adlan Bisultanov (RUS)	Javad Mahjoub (IRI)
Heavyweight (+100 kg)	Marius Paškevičius (LTU)	Adam Okruashvili (GEO)	Stanislav Bondarenko (UKR)
Heavyweight (+100 kg)	Marius Paškevičius (LTU)	Adam Okruashvili (GEO)	Levani Matiashvili (GEO)

=== Women's events ===
Event	Gold	Silver	Bronze
Extra-lightweight (−48 kg)	Irina Dolgova (RUS)	Maryna Cherniak (UKR)	Sümeyye Akkuş (TUR)
Extra-lightweight (−48 kg)	Irina Dolgova (RUS)	Maryna Cherniak (UKR)	Taciana Cesar (GBS)
Half-lightweight (−52 kg)	Majlinda Kelmendi (KOS)	Odette Giuffrida (ITA)	Andreea Chițu (ROU)
Half-lightweight (−52 kg)	Majlinda Kelmendi (KOS)	Odette Giuffrida (ITA)	Romy Tarangul (GER)
Lightweight (−57 kg)	Laëtitia Blot (FRA)	Miryam Roper (GER)	Corina Căprioriu (ROU)
Lightweight (−57 kg)	Laëtitia Blot (FRA)	Miryam Roper (GER)	Hedvig Karakas (HUN)
Half-middleweight (−63 kg)	Kathrin Unterwurzacher (AUT)	Rizlen Zouak (MAR)	Szabina Gercsák (HUN)
Half-middleweight (−63 kg)	Kathrin Unterwurzacher (AUT)	Rizlen Zouak (MAR)	Martyna Trajdos (GER)
Middleweight (−70 kg)	Laura Vargas Koch (GER)	Sally Conway (GBR)	Assmaa Niang (MAR)
Middleweight (−70 kg)	Laura Vargas Koch (GER)	Sally Conway (GBR)	Margaux Pinot (FRA)
Half-heavyweight (−78 kg)	Luise Malzahn (GER)	Natalie Powell (GBR)	Sama Hawa Camara (FRA)
Half-heavyweight (−78 kg)	Luise Malzahn (GER)	Natalie Powell (GBR)	Ivana Maranić (CRO)
Heavyweight (+78 kg)	Nihel Cheikh Rouhou (TUN)	Jasmin Grabowski (GER)	Maria Suelen Altheman (BRA)
Heavyweight (+78 kg)	Nihel Cheikh Rouhou (TUN)	Jasmin Grabowski (GER)	Gülşah Kocatürk (TUR)

Source Results

=== Medal table ===
* Host nation (Turkey)

Rank	Nation	Gold	Silver	Bronze	Total
1	Germany (GER)	4	4	3	11
2	France (FRA)	3	1	4	8
3	Russia (RUS)	2	1	2	5
4	Georgia (GEO)	1	1	1	3
5	Austria (AUT)	1	0	0	1
5	Kosovo (KOS)	1	0	0	1
5	Lithuania (LTU)	1	0	0	1
5	Tunisia (TUN)	1	0	0	1
9	Great Britain (GBR)	0	2	1	3
10	Morocco (MAR)	0	1	1	2
10	Ukraine (UKR)	0	1	1	2
12	Azerbaijan (AZE)	0	1	0	1
12	Italy (ITA)	0	1	0	1
12	Kazakhstan (KAZ)	0	1	0	1
15	Hungary (HUN)	0	0	4	4
16	Turkey (TUR)*	0	0	3	3
17	Brazil (BRA)	0	0	2	2
17	Romania (ROU)	0	0	2	2
19	Croatia (CRO)	0	0	1	1
19	Guinea-Bissau (GBS)	0	0	1	1
19	Iran (IRI)	0	0	1	1
19	Moldova (MDA)	0	0	1	1
Totals (22 entries)		14	14	28	56
