= Daiki Kamikawa =

Japanese judoka (born 1989)

Personal information
- Born: 9 November 1989 (age 36) Yamaguchi, Japan
- Occupation: Judoka

Sport
- Country: Japan
- Sport: Judo
- Weight class: +100 kg, Open

Achievements and titles
- Olympic Games: R16 (2012)
- World Champ.: (2010)
- Asian Champ.: (bronze) (2010)
Medal record
Men's judo
Representing Japan
World Championships
Gold medal – first place	2010 Tokyo	Open
Gold medal – first place	2014 Chelyabinsk	Men's team
Asian Games
Bronze medal – third place	2010 Guangzhou	+100 kg
East Asian Games
Silver medal – second place	2013 Tianjin	+100 kg
World Masters
Silver medal – second place	2012 Almaty	+100 kg
IJF Grand Slam
Silver medal – second place	2011 Paris	+100 kg
Bronze medal – third place	2010 Tokyo	+100 kg
Bronze medal – third place	2015 Tokyo	+100 kg
IJF Grand Prix
Gold medal – first place	2014 Düsseldorf	+100 kg
Bronze medal – third place	2009 Abu Dhabi	+100 kg
Bronze medal – third place	2017 Zagreb	+100 kg
Asian Junior Championships
Gold medal – first place	2007 Hyderabad	+100 kg
Summer Universiade
Silver medal – second place	2009 Belgrade	+100 kg

Profile at external databases
- IJF: 73
- JudoInside.com: 48606
- Updated on 25 July 2023

Daiki Kamikawa (上川 大樹, Kamikawa Daiki; born 9 November 1989 in Yamaguchi, Yamaguchi) is a Japanese judoka. He won the gold medal in the openweight division at the 2010 World Judo Championships by defeating Teddy Riner of France by a flags decision. Kamikawa is known for being a very technical judoka for a heavy weight and uses techniques such as harai goshi and uchi mata with frequency. He represented Japan at the 2012 Summer Olympics.
