= Anne-Sophie Mondière =

French judoka

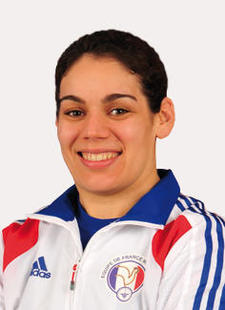

Personal information
- Born: 1 February 1979 (age 47)
- Occupation: Judoka

Sport
- Country: France
- Sport: Judo
- Weight class: +78 kg

Achievements and titles
- Olympic Games: 7th (2008)
- World Champ.: (bronze) (2005, 2005, 2007)
- European Champ.: (gold) (2004, 2005, 2006, 2007, 2008)
Medal record
Women's judo
Representing France
World Championships
Bronze medal – third place	2005 Cairo	+78 kg
Bronze medal – third place	2005 Cairo	Open
Bronze medal – third place	2007 Rio de Janeiro	Open
European Championships
Gold medal – first place	2004 Budapest	Open
Gold medal – first place	2005 Moscow	Open
Gold medal – first place	2006 Tampere	+78 kg
Gold medal – first place	2007 Belgrade	+78 kg
Gold medal – first place	2008 Lisbon	+78 kg
Silver medal – second place	2001 Paris	Open
Silver medal – second place	2002 Maribor	+78 kg
Silver medal – second place	2011 Istanbul	+78 kg
IJF Grand Slam
Bronze medal – third place	2010 Tokyo	+78 kg
Bronze medal – third place	2012 Paris	+78 kg
IJF Grand Prix
Silver medal – second place	2010 Rotterdam	+78 kg
Bronze medal – third place	2011 Düsseldorf	+78 kg
Bronze medal – third place	2011 Abu Dhabi	+78 kg
European Junior Championships
Bronze medal – third place	1997 Ljubljana	+72 kg
Bronze medal – third place	1998 Bucharest	‍–‍78 kg
Summer Universiade
Bronze medal – third place	2001 Beijing	Open

Profile at external databases
- IJF: 3553
- JudoInside.com: 379
- Updated on 15 November 2022

Anne-Sophie Mondière (born 1 February 1979 in Roanne, Loire) is a French judoka (practitioner of judo).
