= Yerzhan Shynkeyev =

Kazakhstani judoka (born 1985)

Personal information
- Born: 4 March 1985 (age 41) Karaganda, Kazakh SSR, Soviet Union
- Occupation: Judoka

Sport
- Country: Kazakhstan
- Sport: Judo
- Weight class: +100 kg

Achievements and titles
- Olympic Games: R32 (2012)
- World Champ.: R32 (2010, 2011, 2013, 2015, 2017)
- Asian Champ.: (bronze) (2011, 2013, 2015, 2016)
Medal record
Men's judo
Representing Kazakhstan
Asian Games
| Silver medal – second place | 2014 Incheon | Men's team |
Asian Championships
| Bronze medal – third place | 2011 Abu Dhabi | +100 kg |
| Bronze medal – third place | 2013 Bangkok | +100 kg |
| Bronze medal – third place | 2015 Kuwait City | +100 kg |
| Bronze medal – third place | 2016 Tashkent | +100 kg |
IJF Grand Prix
| Gold medal – first place | 2016 Tashkent | +100 kg |
| Silver medal – second place | 2013 Almaty | +100 kg |
| Bronze medal – third place | 2017 Düsseldorf | +100 kg |
Asian Junior Championships
| Silver medal – second place | 2004 Doha | ‍–‍100 kg |

Profile at external databases
- IJF: 2338
- JudoInside.com: 29720
- Updated on 7 December 2022

Yerzhan Shynkeyev (born 4 March 1985 in Karaganda, Kazakh SSR, Soviet Union) is a Kazakhstani judoka. He competed at the 2012 Summer Olympics in the +100 kg event.
