= Barna Bor =

Hungarian judoka (born 1986)

Personal information
- Born: 12 December 1986 (age 39)
- Occupation: Judoka

Sport
- Country: Hungary
- Sport: Judo
- Weight class: +100 kg

Achievements and titles
- Olympic Games: 7th (2012)
- World Champ.: (silver) (2011)
- European Champ.: (silver) (2010, 2011, 2012)
Medal record
Men's judo
Representing Hungary
World Championships
Silver medal – second place	2011 Tyumen	Open
European Championships
Silver medal – second place	2010 Vienna	+100 kg
Silver medal – second place	2011 Istanbul	+100 kg
Silver medal – second place	2012 Chelyabinsk	+100 kg
Bronze medal – third place	2013 Budapest	+100 kg
World Masters
Silver medal – second place	2015 Rabat	+100 kg
IJF Grand Slam
Gold medal – first place	2015 Baku	+100 kg
Silver medal – second place	2010 Moscow	+100 kg
Silver medal – second place	2017 Baku	+100 kg
Bronze medal – third place	2009 Moscow	+100 kg
Bronze medal – third place	2011 Rio de Janeiro	+100 kg
Bronze medal – third place	2016 Baku	+100 kg
IJF Grand Prix
Gold medal – first place	2014 Astana	+100 kg
Silver medal – second place	2010 Tunis	+100 kg
Silver medal – second place	2016 Havana	+100 kg
Bronze medal – third place	2009 Tunis	+100 kg
Bronze medal – third place	2011 Amsterdam	+100 kg
Bronze medal – third place	2014 Havana	+100 kg
Bronze medal – third place	2014 Tashkent	+100 kg
Bronze medal – third place	2015 Samsun	+100 kg
Bronze medal – third place	2016 Düsseldorf	+100 kg
Bronze medal – third place	2017 Düsseldorf	+100 kg
European U23 Championships
Gold medal – first place	2006 Moscow	+100 kg
Gold medal – first place	2007 Salzburg	+100 kg
Gold medal – first place	2008 Zagreb	+100 kg
Bronze medal – third place	2004 Ljubljana	+100 kg
World Juniors Championships
Silver medal – second place	2004 Budapest	+100 kg
European Junior Championships
Gold medal – first place	2004 Sofia	+100 kg
Silver medal – second place	2003 Sarajevo	+100 kg
European Cadet Championships
Gold medal – first place	2002 Győr	+90 kg
Summer Universiade
Silver medal – second place	2013 Kazan	+100 kg
Bronze medal – third place	2009 Belgrade	+100 kg
Bronze medal – third place	2013 Kazan	Men's team

Profile at external databases
- IJF: 245
- JudoInside.com: 16532
- Updated on 10 July 2023

Barna Bor (born 12 December 1986) is a Hungarian retired judoka. He competed at the 2008 and 2012 Summer Olympics. At the 2008 Summer Olympics, he lost in the last 32 to Islam El Shehaby. At the 2012 Summer Olympics, he beat Luuk Verbij in the first round, then El Mehdi Malki in the second round, before losing to Andreas Tölzer in the quarterfinal. In the repechage, he lost to Rafael Silva in the first round.

== Achievements ==
Year	Tournament	Place	Weight class
2012	European Judo Championships	2nd	Heavyweight (+100 kg)
2011	European Judo Championships	2nd	Heavyweight (+100 kg)
2006	European Judo Championships	7th	Heavyweight (+100 kg)
2005	European Judo Championships	5th	Heavyweight (+100 kg)
