= Maxim Bryanov =

Russian judoka

- Born: 12 April 1979 (age 46)
- Occupation: judoka
- Notable work: 2005(7th), 2007(5th); European Judo Open Championships

Maxim Bryanov (born 12 April 1979) is a Russian judoka.

== Achievements ==
Year	Tournament	Place	Weight class
2007	European Open Championships	5th	Open class
2005	European Open Championships	7th	Open class
