= Małgorzata Górnicka =

Polish judoka (born 1979)

Medal record

Women's judo

Representing Poland

European Championships
Bronze medal – third place	2005 Moscow	Open class
Bronze medal – third place	2007 Warsaw	Open class

Małgorzata Górnicka (born 16 September 1979) is a Polish judoka.

== Achievements ==
Year	Tournament	Place	Weight class
2007	European Open Championships	3rd	Open class
2006	European Championships	7th	Heavyweight (+78 kg)
2006	European Open Championships	5th	Open class
2005	European Open Championships	3rd	Open class
2000	European Championships	7th	Open class
