= Elena Ivashchenko =

Russian judoka (1984–2013)

Personal information
- Born: 28 December 1984
- Died: 15 June 2013 (aged 28)
- Occupation: Judoka

Sport
- Country: Russia
- Sport: Judo
- Weight class: +78 kg

Achievements and titles
- Olympic Games: 7th (2012)
- World Champ.: (silver) (2008)
- European Champ.: (gold) (2007, 2009, 2011, 2012)
Medal record
Women's judo
Representing Russia
World Championships
Silver medal – second place	2008 Paris Levallois	Open
Bronze medal – third place	2007 Rio de Janeiro	Open
Bronze medal – third place	2011 Paris	+78 kg
European Championships
Gold medal – first place	2007 Warsaw	Open
Gold medal – first place	2009 Tbilisi	+78 kg
Gold medal – first place	2011 Istanbul	+78 kg
Gold medal – first place	2012 Chelyabinsk	+78 kg
Bronze medal – third place	2006 Novi Sad	Open
IJF Grand Slam
Gold medal – first place	2008 Tokyo	+78 kg
Gold medal – first place	2010 Paris	+78 kg
Silver medal – second place	2009 Tokyo	+78 kg
Silver medal – second place	2012 Paris	+78 kg
Bronze medal – third place	2009 Paris	+78 kg
Bronze medal – third place	2009 Moscow	+78 kg
IJF Grand Prix
Gold medal – first place	2011 Abu Dhabi	+78 kg
Bronze medal – third place	2012 Düsseldorf	+78 kg
European U23 Championships
Silver medal – second place	2005 Kyiv	+78 kg
European Junior Championships
Silver medal – second place	2002 Rotterdam	+78 kg
Summer Universiade
Bronze medal – third place	2003 Jeju	+78 kg

Profile at external databases
- IJF: 1968
- JudoInside.com: 43706
- Updated on 17 July 2023

Elena Ivashchenko (née Shleyzye; Russian: Елена Иващенко, Елена Шлейзе; 28 December 1984 – 15 June 2013) was a Russian judoka.

== Biography ==
Ivashchenko was born in Omsk, Russia on 28 December 1984.

She won a silver medal (2008) and two bronze medals (2007, 2011) at the World Judo Championships (and World Open Judo Championships). She also had four gold medals (2007, 2009, 2011, 2012) and one bronze medal (2006) at the European Judo Championships. She competed at the 2012 Summer Olympics in the +78 kg event and lost in the repechage to Iryna Kindzerska.

She committed suicide in Tyumen, Russia, at the age of 28 on 15 June 2013.
