= 2010 European Judo Championships – Men's team =

Judo competition

Judo Men's team at the 2010 European Judo Championships
- Venue: Ferry-Dusika-Hallenstadion
- Location: Vienna, Austria
- Date: 25 April
- Nations: 13

Medalists
gold medal	Georgia (4th title)
silver medal	France
bronze medal	Romania
bronze medal	Russia

Competition at external databases
- Links: EJU • JudoInside

The men's team competition at the 2010 European Judo Championships was held on 25 April at the Ferry-Dusika-Hallenstadion in Vienna, Austria.

== Results ==
Round of 16
Hungary	2
Poland	3
Austria	2
Moldova	3
Spain	2
Italy	3
France	4
Great Britain	1
Ukraine	4
Belarus	1

Quarter-finals
Poland	3
Romania	2
Georgia	3
Moldova	2
Russia	2
Italy	3
France	3
Ukraine	2

Semi-finals
Poland	2
Georgia	3
Italy	2
France	3

Final
Georgia	3
France	2

=== Repechage ===
Repechage
Romania	3
Moldova	2

Third place
Romania	3
Italy	2

Repechage
Russia	4
Ukraine	1

Third place
Russia	3
Poland	2
