= 2006 World Team Judo Championships =

Judo competition

2006 Judo World Team Judo Championships
- Venue: Accor Arena
- Location: Paris, France
- Dates: 16–17 September

Champions
- Men's team: Georgia (1st title)
- Women's team: France (1st title)

Competition at external databases
- Links: JudoInside

The 2006 World Team Judo Championships were held at the Bercy in Paris, France from 16 to 17 September 2006.

== Medal summary ==
Event	Gold	Silver	Bronze
Men's team	Georgia	Russia	South Korea
Men's team	Georgia	Russia	France
Women's team	France	Cuba	China
Women's team	France	Cuba	Japan
