= 2011 World Judo Championships – Men's team =

Judo competition

Judo Men's team at the 2011 World Judo Championships
- Venue: Accor Arena
- Location: Paris, France
- Date: 28 August

Medalists
gold medal	France (2nd title)
silver medal	Brazil
bronze medal	South Korea
bronze medal	Japan

Competition at external databases
- Links: EJU • JudoInside

The men's team competition of the 2011 World Judo Championships was held on August 28. Each team consists of five competitors, one each from the –66, –73, –81, –90 and +90 kg categories.

== Medalists ==
Gold	Silver	Bronze
France	Brazil	South Korea; Japan

== Results ==
=== Bracket ===
First Round
Japan	4
United Kingdom	1
Australia	1
Kazakhstan	4
Russia	5
Mongolia	0
France	4
Poland	1
Brazil	5
Uzbekistan	0
Algeria	1
China	4
South Korea	5
United States	0
Germany	2
Georgia	3

Quarterfinals
Japan	5
Kazakhstan	0
Russia	2
France	3
Brazil	5
China	0
South Korea	3
Georgia	2

Semifinals
Japan	2
France	3
Brazil	3
South Korea	2

Final
France	3
Brazil	2

=== Repechage ===
Repechage		Third place
Kazakhstan	0
Russia	5	Russia	1
		South Korea	4

Repechage		Third place
China	0
Georgia	5	Georgia	2
		Japan	3
