= El Mehdi Malki =

Moroccan judoka

El Mehdi Malki (born 1 January 1988 in Salé, Morocco) is a Moroccan judoka. He competed at the 2012 Summer Olympics in the +100 kg event.
