= Grzegorz Eitel =

Polish judoka

Personal information
- Full name: Grzegorz Michał Eitel
- Born: 14 January 1981 (age 45) Warsaw, Poland
- Occupation: Judoka
- Height: 190 cm (6 ft 3 in)
- Weight: 140 kg (309 lb)

Sport
- Country: Poland
- Sport: Judo
- Weight class: +100 kg

Achievements and titles
- Olympic Games: R32 (2004)
- World Champ.: (bronze) (2008)
- European Champ.: 5th (2007)
Medal record
Men's judo
Representing Poland
World Championships
| Bronze medal – third place | 2008 Paris Levallois | Open |
World Juniors Championships
| Bronze medal – third place | 1998 Cali | +100 kg |
European Junior Championships
| Gold medal – first place | 2000 Nicosia | +100 kg |
| Bronze medal – third place | 1999 Rome | +100 kg |
Summer Universiade
| Silver medal – second place | 2009 Belgrade | Open |

Profile at external databases
- IJF: 1975
- JudoInside.com: 8887
- Updated on 17 February 2022

Grzegorz Michał Eitel (born 14 January 1981 in Warsaw) is a Polish judoka. He competed for Poland at the 2004 Summer Olympics in the men's +100 kg event.

== Achievements ==
| Year | Tournament | Place | Weight class |
|---|---|---|---|
| 2007 | European Open Championships | 5th | Open class |
| 2006 | European Open Championships | 7th | Open class |
