= Lasha Gujejiani =

Georgian judoka (born 1985)

Personal information
- Born: 12 August 1985 (age 40)
- Occupation: Judoka

Sport
- Country: Georgia
- Sport: Judo
- Weight class: +100 kg

Achievements and titles
- Olympic Games: 5th (2008)
- World Champ.: (bronze) (2005, 2007)
- European Champ.: (silver) (2007)
Medal record
Men's judo
Representing Georgia
World Championships
Bronze medal – third place	2005 Cairo	+100 kg
Bronze medal – third place	2007 Rio de Janeiro	+100 kg
European Championships
Silver medal – second place	2007 Belgrade	+100 kg
European U23 Championships
Gold medal – first place	2005 Kyiv	+100 kg
Silver medal – second place	2003 Yerevan	+100 kg
World Juniors Championships
Gold medal – first place	2004 Budapest	+100 kg
European Junior Championships
Gold medal – first place	2003 Sarajevo	+100 kg
Silver medal – second place	2004 Sofia	+100 kg

Profile at external databases
- IJF: 2453
- JudoInside.com: 16402
- Updated on 16 November 2022

Lasha Gujejiani (Georgian: ლაშა გუჯეჯიანი; born 12 August 1985) is a Georgian judo coach and former judoka, currently serving as the head coach of the Georgian national judo team. He competed at the 2004 Summer Olympics and the 2008 Summer Olympics.

He is widely recognized as one of the world's best judo coaches, officially named the World's Best Coach by the International Judo Federation (IJF) and Europe's Best Coach by the European Judo Union (EJU).

== Biography ==
Lasha Gujejiani grew up in a family of athletes. His interest in judo emerged at an early age, leading him to enroll in a local sports school, where he quickly demonstrated the qualities essential for a judoka. After achieving early success in tournaments across Tbilisi and various regions of Georgia, he was invited to join the Georgian youth national team.

At the age of 18, in 2004, Gujejiani won the World Junior Championship, establishing himself on the international stage. He later became the European Junior Champion and a multiple medalist at international tournaments. Over the years, Gujejiani represented Georgia in numerous World and European Championships, winning several medals and earning recognition as one of the country's most consistent heavyweights.

== Coaching career ==
After retiring from active competition, Gujejiani began his coaching career in 2019. He was soon appointed as the head coach of the Georgian national team.

Under his leadership, Georgia achieved outstanding results at the Tokyo 2020 Olympic Games, earning one gold medal and three silver medals.

At the Paris 2024 Olympic Games, the Georgian national team achieved remarkable success under his guidance: Lasha Bekauri became Olympic champion for the second consecutive time, while Tato Grigalashvili and Ilia Sulamanidze each won silver medals.

In 2025, at the World Judo Championships in Budapest, the Georgian team, coached by Gujejiani, achieved a historic milestone by winning the mixed team world title for the first time in history. In individual categories, Georgian judokas claimed several medals, including Eteri Liparteliani, who became Georgia's first-ever female world judo champion.

== Achievements ==
Year	Tournament	Place	Weight class
2008	European Championships	5th	Heavyweight (+100 kg)
2007	World Judo Championships	3rd	Heavyweight (+100 kg)
2007	European Judo Championships	2nd	Heavyweight (+100 kg)
2005	World Judo Championships	3rd	Heavyweight (+100 kg)
2005	European Judo Open Championships	5th	Open class
2004	European Judo Championships	7th	Heavyweight (+100 kg)

== Coaching achievements ==
- 2019 – present — Head Coach of the Georgian National Judo Team
- 2020 — Tokyo Olympic Games: 4 medals (1 gold – Lasha Bekauri, 3 silver).
- 2021 — European Championships (Lisbon, Portugal): Georgia ranked 1st in the team standings, winning 5 medals (1 gold, 3 silver, 1 bronze).
- 2022 — Named Europe's Best Coach of 2021 by the European Judo Union (EJU) (Sofia, Bulgaria).
- 2022 — Named World's Best Coach by the International Judo Federation (IJF) during the Paris Grand Slam, recognizing his dual success as an athlete and coach and highlighting his pivotal role in Georgia's rise on the international stage.
