= Alexander Mikhaylin =

Russian judoka (born 1979)

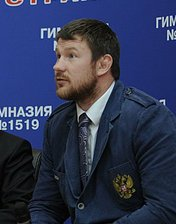

Personal information
- Born: 18 August 1979 (age 46)
- Occupation: Judoka

Sport
- Country: Russia
- Sport: Judo
- Weight class: –100 kg, +100 kg, Open
- Rank: 7th dan black belt

Achievements and titles
- Olympic Games: (silver) (2012)
- World Champ.: (2001, 2001, 2005)
- European Champ.: (gold) (2001, 2003, 2005, 2006, 2007, 2012)
Medal record
Men's judo
Representing Russia
Olympic Games
Silver medal – second place	2012 London	+100 kg
World Championships
Gold medal – first place	2001 Munich	+100 kg
Gold medal – first place	2001 Munich	Open
Gold medal – first place	2005 Cairo	+100 kg
Silver medal – second place	2008 Paris Levallois	Open
Bronze medal – third place	1999 Birmingham	‍–‍100 kg
Bronze medal – third place	2011 Paris	+100 kg
Bronze medal – third place	2011 Tyumen	Open
European Championships
Gold medal – first place	2001 Paris	Open
Gold medal – first place	2003 Düsseldorf	Open
Gold medal – first place	2005 Rotterdam	+100 kg
Gold medal – first place	2006 Novi Sad	Open
Gold medal – first place	2007 Warsaw	Open
Gold medal – first place	2012 Chelyabinsk	+100 kg
Silver medal – second place	2002 Maribor	Open
Silver medal – second place	2005 Moscow	Open
Bronze medal – third place	1999 Bratislava	‍–‍100 kg
Bronze medal – third place	2007 Belgrade	+100 kg
Bronze medal – third place	2009 Tbilisi	+100 kg
IJF Grand Slam
Gold medal – first place	2009 Moscow	+100 kg
Gold medal – first place	2011 Tokyo	+100 kg
Silver medal – second place	2009 Paris	+100 kg
World Juniors Championships
Gold medal – first place	1998 Cali	+100 kg
European Junior Championships
Gold medal – first place	1997 Ljubljana	+95 kg
Silver medal – second place	1996 Monte Carlo	‍–‍95 kg
Summer Universiade
Silver medal – second place	2001 Beijing	+100 kg

Profile at external databases
- IJF: 364
- JudoInside.com: 589
- Updated on 25 May 2023

Alexander Mikhaylin (born 18 August 1979) is a Russian judoka. He is a silver medalist in heavyweight at the 2012 Olympics in London, as well as multiple world champion.

== Achievements ==
Year	Tournament	Place	Weight class
2014	ECCO Team Challenge	1st	Heavyweight (+100 kg)
2012	Summer Olympics	2nd	Heavyweight (+100 kg)
2012	European Judo Championships	1st	Heavyweight (+100 kg)
2009	European Judo Championships	3rd	Heavyweight (+100 kg)
2007	European Judo Championships	3rd	Heavyweight (+100 kg)
2007	European Open Championships	1st	Open class
2006	European Open Championships	1st	Open class
2005	World Judo Championships	1st	Heavyweight (+100 kg)
2005	European Judo Championships	1st	Heavyweight (+100 kg)
2005	European Open Championships	2nd	Open class
2003	World Judo Championships	lost	Open class
2003	European Judo Championships	1st	Open class
2002	European Judo Championships	2nd	Open class
2001	World Judo Championships	1st	Heavyweight (+100 kg)
2001	World Judo Championships	1st	Open class
2001	European Judo Championships	1st	Open class
1999	World Judo Championships	3rd	Half heavyweight (100 kg)
1999	European Judo Championships	3rd	Half heavyweight (100 kg)
