= Tomohiko Hoshina =

Olympic judoka

Personal information
- Native name: 保科智彦
- Born: July 4, 1987 (age 39) Shizuoka, Japan
- Occupation: Judoka
- Height: 5 ft 11 in (180 cm) (2012)
- Weight: 125 kg (276 lb) (2012)

Sport
- Country: Philippines
- Sport: Judo

Tomohiko Hoshina (保科智彦, Hoshina Tomohiko) is a judoka who represented the Philippines at the World Judo Championships, the Southeast Asian Games, and the Olympic Games.

== Early life ==
Hoshina was born and raised in Shizuoka, Japan to a Filipina mother and Japanese father. He started competing in judo before the age of 10 - his father is a judo fanatic and encouraged him to enter tournaments.

He continued competing in judo while at college and he hopes eventually to become a sumo wrestling teacher.

== Career ==
=== 2012 Summer Olympics ===
In 2012 Summer Olympics in London, Hoshina debuted in the Men's +100 kg in judo, representing the Philippines.

On August 3, 2012, in the pool round, Hoshina was drawn against Kim Sung-Min of South Korea who had previously beaten him at the 2011 World Judo Championships and the 2011 Asian Judo Championships. Hoshina did not progress to the next round, again losing to Kim due to Kim's full-point throw, an ippon. The game was timed out in 1 minute and 5 seconds ending with Kim scoring 100 to Hoshina's 0.
