= Matjaž Ceraj =

Slovenian judoka

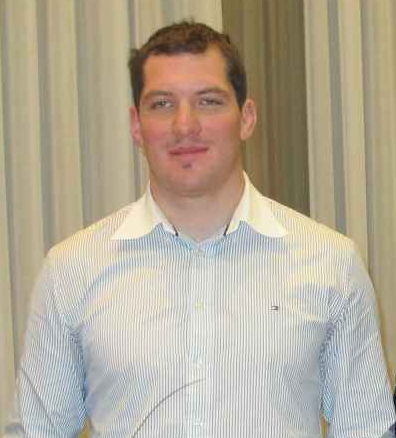
- Matjaž Ceraj in 2011

Personal information
- Born: 14 September 1983 (age 42)
- Occupation: Judoka

Sport
- Country: Slovenia
- Sport: Judo
- Weight class: +100 kg

Achievements and titles
- Olympic Games: R16 (2012)
- World Champ.: 9th (2007)
- European Champ.: 5th (2007, 2012, 2013, 2014)
Medal record
Men's judo
Representing Slovenia
IJF Grand Prix
Bronze medal – third place	2015 Zagreb	+100 kg

Profile at external databases
- IJF: 2066
- JudoInside.com: 14207
- Updated on 16 December 2022

Matjaž Ceraj (born 14 September 1983 in Celje) is a Slovenian judoka.

== Achievements ==
Year	Tournament	Place	Weight class
2007	European Judo Championships	5th	Heavyweight (+100 kg)
