= Ángel Parra (judoka) =

Spanish judoka

Medal record

Representing Spain

Men's Judo

Mediterranean Games
Bronze medal – third place	2009 Pescara	+100 kg
Bronze medal – third place	2018 Tarragona	+100 kg

Ángel Parra (born 19 August 1983) is a Spanish judoka.

== Achievements ==
Year	Tournament	Place	Weight class
2007	European Judo Championships	7th	Heavyweight (+100 kg)
