= Andreas Tölzer =

German judoka (born 1980)

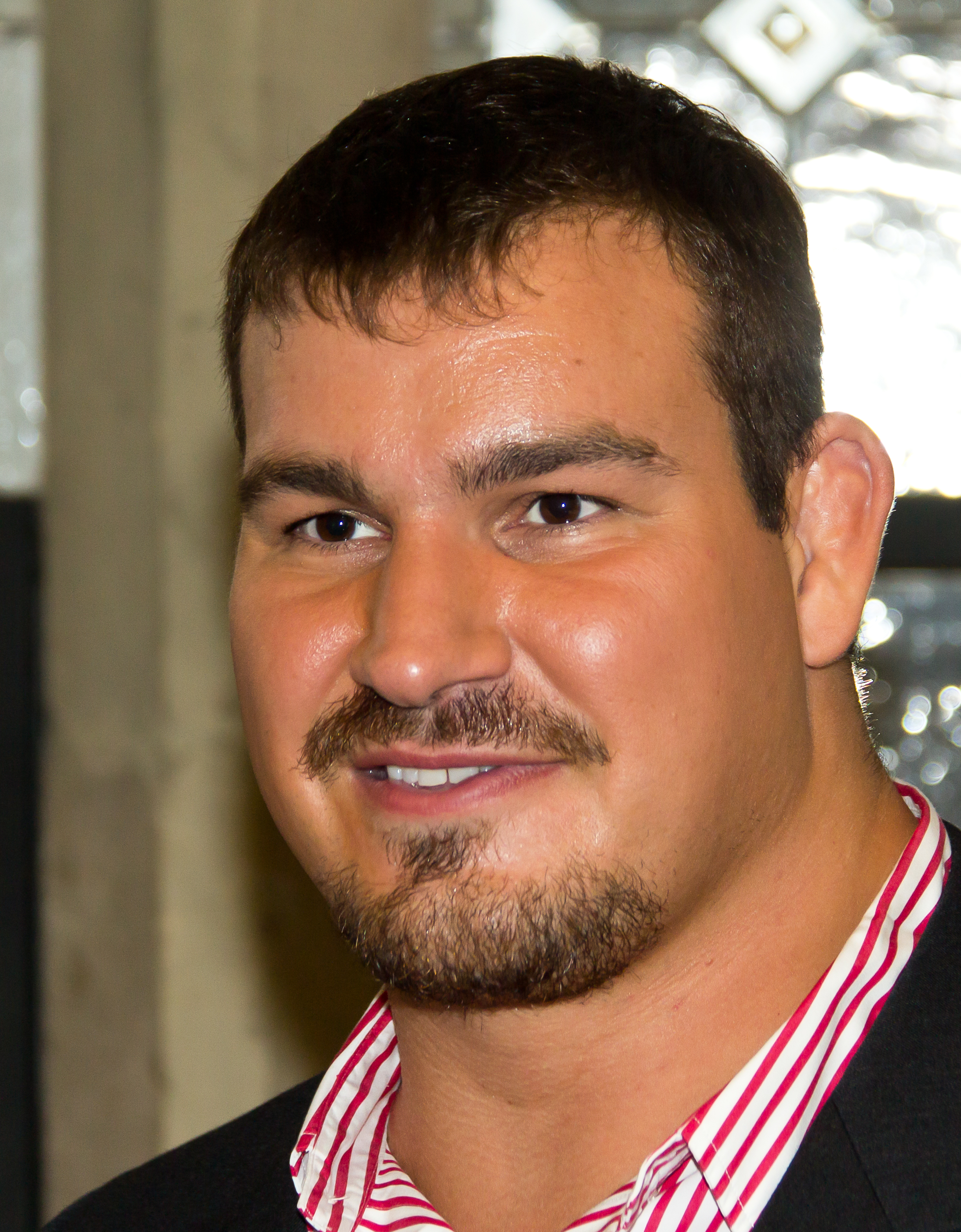
- Tölzer in 2012

Personal information
- Born: 27 January 1980 (age 46)
- Occupation: Judoka
- Website: www.andreastoelzer.de

Sport
- Country: Germany
- Sport: Judo
- Weight class: +100 kg

Achievements and titles
- Olympic Games: (bronze) (2012)
- World Champ.: (silver) (2010, 2011)
- European Champ.: (gold) (2006)
Medal record
Men's judo
Representing Germany
Olympic Games
Bronze medal – third place	2012 London	+100 kg
World Championships
Silver medal – second place	2010 Tokyo	+100 kg
Silver medal – second place	2011 Paris	+100 kg
Bronze medal – third place	2013 Rio de Janeiro	+100 kg
European Championships
Gold medal – first place	2006 Tampere	+100 kg
Bronze medal – third place	2003 Düsseldorf	Open
Bronze medal – third place	2007 Belgrade	+100 kg
Bronze medal – third place	2010 Vienna	+100 kg
World Masters
Bronze medal – third place	2011 Baku	+100 kg
Bronze medal – third place	2012 Almaty	+100 kg
Bronze medal – third place	2013 Tyumen	+100 kg
IJF Grand Slam
Silver medal – second place	2009 Moscow	+100 kg
Silver medal – second place	2010 Rio de Janeiro	+100 kg
Silver medal – second place	2013 Moscow	+100 kg
Bronze medal – third place	2010 Tokyo	+100 kg
IJF Grand Prix
Gold medal – first place	2010 Abu Dhabi	+100 kg
Gold medal – first place	2011 Düsseldorf	+100 kg
Gold medal – first place	2011 Amsterdam	+100 kg
Gold medal – first place	2012 Düsseldorf	+100 kg
Silver medal – second place	2009 Tunis	+100 kg
Bronze medal – third place	2010 Tunis	+100 kg
European Junior Championships
Gold medal – first place	1998 Bucharest	+100 kg
Silver medal – second place	1999 Rome	+100 kg

Profile at external databases
- IJF: 606
- JudoInside.com: 291
- Updated on 25 May 2023

Andreas Tölzer (also spelled Toelzer; born 27 January 1980) is a German judoka.

== Achievements ==
Year	Tournament	Place	Weight class
2012	2012 London Olympics	3rd	Heavyweight (+100 kg)
2009	European Judo Championships	5th	Heavyweight (+100 kg)
2007	European Judo Championships	3rd	Heavyweight (+100 kg)
2006	European Judo Championships	1st	Heavyweight (+100 kg)
2004	Olympic Games	7th	Heavyweight (+100 kg)
2004	European Judo Championships	5th	Heavyweight (+100 kg)
2003	European Judo Championships	3rd	Open class
2001	World Judo Championships	7th	Heavyweight (+100 kg)
