= 2004 European Judo Championships =

2004 Judo European Judo Championships
- Venue: Polyvalent Hall, Bucharest
- Location: Bucharest, Romania
- Dates: 14–16 May 2004

Competition at external databases
- Links: JudoInside

The 2004 European Judo Championships were the 15th edition of the European Judo Championships, and were held in Bucharest, Romania from 14 May to 16 May 2004.

== Medal overview ==
=== Men ===
| Event | Gold | Silver | Bronze |
|---|---|---|---|
| 60 kg | (Austria) Ludwig Paischer | (Greece) Revazi Zidiridis | (Armenia) Armen Nazaryan (Russia) Evgeni Stanev |
| 66 kg | (Turkey) Bektaş Demirel | (Azerbaijan) Elchin Ismayilov | (France) Benjamin Darbelet (Spain) Óscar Peñas |
| 73 kg | (Spain) Kioshi Uematsu | (Israel) Yoel Razvozov | (Georgia (country)) David Kevkhishvili (Latvia) Vsevolods Zeļonijs |
| 81 kg | (Greece) Ilias Nikolaos Iliadis | (Germany) Ole Bischof | (Spain) Ricardo Echarte (Russia) Dimitri Nossov |
| 90 kg | (Italy) Francesco Lepre | (Netherlands) Mark Huizinga | (Ukraine) Valentyn Grekov (Russia) Khasanbi Taov |
| 100 kg | (Israel) Ariel Ze'evi | (Hungary) Antal Kovács | (France) Ghislain Lemaire (Italy) Michele Monti |
| +100 kg | (Turkey) Selim Tataroğlu | (Estonia) Indrek Pertelson | (Russia) Tamerlan Tmenov (Netherlands) Dennis van der Geest |

=== Women ===
| Event | Gold | Silver | Bronze |
|---|---|---|---|
| 48 kg | (Romania) Alina Alexandra Dumitru | (Belarus) Tatiana Moskvina | (France) Frédérique Jossinet (Netherlands) Nynke Klopstra |
| 52 kg | (Romania) Ioana Maria Aluaș | (Belgium) Ilse Heylen | (Portugal) Telma Monteiro (Slovenia) Petra Nareks |
| 57 kg | (Spain) Isabel Fernández | (United Kingdom) Sophie Cox | (Italy) Cinzia Cavazzuti (Russia) Natalia Yukhareva |
| 63 kg | (Spain) Sara Álvarez | (Poland) Aneta Szczepańska | (United Kingdom) Sarah Clark (Russia) Yulia Kuzina |
| 70 kg | (Netherlands) Edith Bosch | (Spain) Cecilia Blanco | (Czech Republic) Andrea Pažoutová (Slovenia) Raša Sraka |
| 78 kg | (Germany) Jenny Karl | (Italy) Lucia Morico | (Ukraine) Anastasiia Matrosova (Spain) Esther San Miguel |
| +78 kg | (Ukraine) Maryna Prokofyeva | (United Kingdom) Karina Bryant | (Germany) Katrin Beinroth (Bulgaria) Tsvetana Bozhilova |

=== Medals table ===
| Rank | Nation | Gold | Silver | Bronze | Total |
|---|---|---|---|---|---|
| 1 | Spain | 3 | 1 | 3 | 7 |
| 2 | Romania | 2 | 0 | 0 | 2 |
| 2 | Turkey | 2 | 0 | 0 | 2 |
| 4 | Italy | 1 | 1 | 2 | 4 |
| 4 | Netherlands | 1 | 1 | 2 | 4 |
| 6 | Germany | 1 | 1 | 1 | 3 |
| 7 | Greece | 1 | 1 | 0 | 2 |
| 7 | Israel | 1 | 1 | 0 | 2 |
| 9 | Austria | 1 | 0 | 0 | 1 |
| 10 | Great Britain | 0 | 2 | 1 | 3 |
| 11 | Azerbaijan | 0 | 1 | 0 | 1 |
| 11 | Belgium | 0 | 1 | 0 | 1 |
| 11 | Estonia | 0 | 1 | 0 | 1 |
| 11 | Hungary | 0 | 1 | 0 | 1 |
| 11 | Poland | 0 | 1 | 0 | 1 |
| 16 | Russia | 0 | 0 | 6 | 6 |
| 17 | France | 0 | 0 | 3 | 3 |
| 18 | Slovenia | 0 | 0 | 2 | 2 |
| 18 | Ukraine | 0 | 0 | 2 | 2 |
| 20 | Armenia | 0 | 0 | 1 | 1 |
| 20 | Bulgaria | 0 | 0 | 1 | 1 |
| 20 | Czech Republic | 0 | 0 | 1 | 1 |
| 20 | Georgia | 0 | 0 | 1 | 1 |
| 20 | Latvia | 0 | 0 | 1 | 1 |
| 20 | Portugal | 0 | 0 | 1 | 1 |

== Results overview ==
=== Men ===
==== 60 kg ====
| Position | Judoka | Country |
|---|---|---|
| 1. | Ludwig Paischer | Austria |
| 2. | Revazi Zintiridis | Greece |
| 3. | Armen Nazaryan | Armenia |
| 3. | Evgeni Stanev | Russia |
| 5. | Ruben Houkes | Netherlands |
| 5. | Siarhei Novikau | Belarus |
| 7. | John Buchanan | Great Britain |
| 7. | László Burján | Hungary |

==== 66 kg ====
| Position | Judoka | Country |
|---|---|---|
| 1. | Bektaş Demirel | Turkey |
| 2. | Elchin Ismayilov | Azerbaijan |
| 3. | Benjamin Darbelet | France |
| 3. | Óscar Peñas | Spain |
| 5. | Andreas Mitterfellner | Austria |
| 5. | Musa Nastuyev | Ukraine |
| 7. | Tomasz Adamiec | Poland |
| 7. | João Pina | Portugal |

==== 73 kg ====
| Position | Judoka | Country |
|---|---|---|
| 1. | Kioshi Uematsu | Spain |
| 2. | Yoel Razvozov | Israel |
| 3. | David Kevkhishvili | Georgia |
| 3. | Vsevolods Zeļonijs | Latvia |
| 5. | Claudiu Baștea | Romania |
| 5. | Francesco Bruyere | Italy |
| 7. | Sezer Huysuz | Turkey |
| 7. | Sašo Jereb | Slovenia |

==== 81 kg ====
| Position | Judoka | Country |
|---|---|---|
| 1. | Ilias Nikolaos Iliadis | Greece |
| 2. | Ole Bischof | Germany |
| 3. | Ricardo Echarte | Spain |
| 3. | Dimitri Nossov | Russia |
| 5. | Mehman Azizov | Azerbaijan |
| 5. | Euan Burton | Great Britain |
| 7. | Aleksei Budõlin | Estonia |
| 7. | Evghenii Rusu | Moldova |

==== 90 kg ====
| Position | Judoka | Country |
|---|---|---|
| 1. | Francesco Lepre | Italy |
| 2. | Mark Huizinga | Netherlands |
| 3. | Valentyn Grekov | Ukraine |
| 3. | Khasanbi Taov | Russia |
| 5. | Frédéric Demontfaucon | France |
| 5. | Renato Morais | Portugal |
| 7. | David Alarza | Spain |
| 7. | Anton Novik | Belarus |

==== 100 kg ====
| Position | Judoka | Country |
|---|---|---|
| 1. | Ariel Ze'evi | Israel |
| 2. | Antal Kovács | Hungary |
| 3. | Ghislain Lemaire | France |
| 3. | Michele Monti | Italy |
| 5. | Michael Jurack | Germany |
| 5. | Zoltán Pálkovács | Slovakia |
| 7. | Franz Birkfellner | Austria |
| 7. | Vitaliy Bubon | Ukraine |

==== +100 kg ====
| Position | Judoka | Country |
|---|---|---|
| 1. | Selim Tataroğlu | Turkey |
| 2. | Indrek Pertelson | Estonia |
| 3. | Tamerlan Tmenov | Russia |
| 3. | Dennis van der Geest | Netherlands |
| 5. | Paolo Bianchessi | Italy |
| 5. | Andreas Tölzer | Germany |
| 7. | Lasha Gujejiani | Georgia |
| 7. | Andrian Kordon | Israel |

=== Women ===
==== 48 kg ====
| Position | Judoka | Country |
|---|---|---|
| 1. | Alina Alexandra Dumitru | Romania |
| 2. | Tatiana Moskvina | Belarus |
| 3. | Frédérique Jossinet | France |
| 3. | Nynke Klopstra | Netherlands |
| 5. | Tatiana Bobalova | Russia |
| 5. | Giuseppina Macri | Italy |
| 7. | Neşe Şensoy | Turkey |
| 7. | Ann Simons | Belgium |

==== 52 kg ====
| Position | Judoka | Country |
|---|---|---|
| 1. | Ioana Maria Aluaș | Romania |
| 2. | Ilse Heylen | Belgium |
| 3. | Telma Monteiro | Portugal |
| 3. | Petra Nareks | Slovenia |
| 5. | Oxana Karzakova | Russia |
| 5. | Natascha van Gurp | Netherlands |
| 7. | Nigar Jabbarova | Azerbaijan |
| 7. | Jovana Rogić | Serbia |

==== 57 kg ====
| Position | Judoka | Country |
|---|---|---|
| 1. | Isabel Fernández | Spain |
| 2. | Sophie Cox | Great Britain |
| 3. | Cinzia Cavazzuti | Italy |
| 3. | Natalia Yukhareva | Russia |
| 5. | Ioulietta Boukouvala | Greece |
| 5. | Sabrina Filzmoser | Austria |
| 7. | Kifayat Gasimova | Azerbaijan |
| 7. | Inga Gołaszewska | Poland |

==== 63 kg ====
| Position | Judoka | Country |
|---|---|---|
| 1. | Sara Álvarez | Spain |
| 2. | Aneta Szczepańska | Poland |
| 3. | Sarah Clark | Great Britain |
| 3. | Yulia Kuzina | Russia |
| 5. | Ylenia Scapin | Italy |
| 5. | Elisabeth Willeboordse | Netherlands |
| 7. | Lucie Décosse | France |
| 7. | Johanna Ylinen | Finland |

==== 70 kg ====
| Position | Judoka | Country |
|---|---|---|
| 1. | Edith Bosch | Netherlands |
| 2. | Cecilia Blanco | Spain |
| 3. | Andrea Pažoutová | Czech Republic |
| 3. | Raša Sraka | Slovenia |
| 5. | Amina Abdellatif | France |
| 5. | Maryna Pryshchepa | Ukraine |
| 7. | Erica Barbieri | Italy |
| 7. | Despina Panayiotou | Cyprus |

==== 78 kg ====
| Position | Judoka | Country |
|---|---|---|
| 1. | Jenny Karl | Germany |
| 2. | Lucia Morico | Italy |
| 3. | Anastasiya Matrosova | Ukraine |
| 3. | Esther San Miguel | Spain |
| 5. | Vera Moskalyuk | Russia |
| 5. | Sviatlana Tsimashenka | Belarus |
| 7. | Alena Eiglová | Czech Republic |
| 7. | Rachel Wilding | Great Britain |

==== +78 kg ====
| Position | Judoka | Country |
|---|---|---|
| 1. | Maryna Prokofyeva | Ukraine |
| 2. | Karina Bryant | Great Britain |
| 3. | Katrin Beinroth | Germany |
| 3. | Tsvetana Bozhilova | Bulgaria |
| 5. | Barbara Andolina | Italy |
| 5. | Elena Shleyzye | Russia |
| 7. | Yuliya Barysik | Belarus |
| 7. | Magdalena Kozioł | Poland |
