= Ihar Makarau =

Belarusian judoka (born 1979)

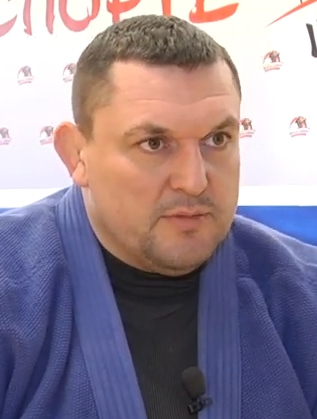
- Makarau in 2020

Personal information
- Nationality: Belarusian
- Born: 20 July 1979 (age 46) Kimry, Russian SFSR, Soviet Union
- Occupation: Judoka

Sport
- Country: Belarus
- Sport: Judo
- Weight class: –100 kg, +100 kg
- Rank: 6th dan black belt

Achievements and titles
- Olympic Games: (gold) (2004)
- World Champ.: (bronze) (2003)
- European Champ.: (gold) (2010)
Medal record
Men's judo
Representing Belarus
Olympic Games
Gold medal – first place	2004 Athens	‍–‍100 kg
World Championships
Bronze medal – third place	2003 Osaka	‍–‍100 kg
European Championships
Gold medal – first place	2010 Vienna	+100 kg
Silver medal – second place	2007 Warsaw	Open
Bronze medal – third place	2002 Maribor	‍–‍100 kg
Bronze medal – third place	2003 Düsseldorf	‍–‍100 kg
Bronze medal – third place	2009 Tbilisi	+100 kg
IJF Grand Prix
Gold medal – first place	2011 Qingdao	+100 kg
Silver medal – second place	2011 Baku	+100 kg
European Junior Championships
Gold medal – first place	1998 Bucharest	‍–‍100 kg
Silver medal – second place	1997 Ljubljana	‍–‍95 kg
Summer Universiade
Bronze medal – third place	2001 Beijing	Open

Profile at external databases
- IJF: 866
- JudoInside.com: 3364
- Updated on 30 May 2023

Ihar Viktaravich Makarau (Belarusian: Ігар Віктаравіч Макараў; born 20 July 1979 in Kimry, Russian SFSR, Soviet Union), also commonly known by the Russian spelling Igor Viktorovich Makarov (Russian: И́горь Ви́кторович Мака́ров), is a Belarusian judoka. He won the gold medal in the half-heavyweight (100 kg) division at the 2004 Summer Olympics. He was also the European Champion in 2010.

== Achievements ==
Year	Tournament	Place	Weight class
2012	Olympic Games	5th	Heavyweight (+100 kg)
2009	European Judo Championships	3rd	Heavyweight (+100 kg)
2007	European Open Championships	2nd	Open class
2006	European Judo Championships	5th	Half heavyweight (100 kg)
2004	Olympic Games	1st	Half heavyweight (100 kg)
2003	World Judo Championships	3rd	Half heavyweight (100 kg)
2003	European Judo Championships	3rd	Half heavyweight (100 kg)
2002	European Judo Championships	3rd	Half heavyweight (100 kg)
2001	Universiade	3rd	Open class

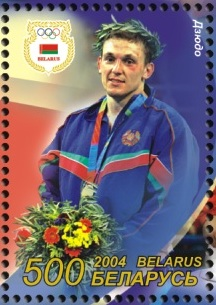
Makarau on a 2004 Belarusian stamp
