= Marius Paškevičius =

Lithuanian judoka (born 1979)

Personal information
- Born: 31 October 1979 (age 46)
- Occupation: Judoka

Sport
- Country: Lithuania
- Sport: Judo
- Weight class: +100 kg

Achievements and titles
- Olympic Games: R16 (2000, 2012)
- World Champ.: (bronze) (2009)
- European Champ.: (bronze) (2012, 2014)
Medal record
Men's judo
Representing Lithuania
World Championships
Bronze medal – third place	2009 Rotterdam	+100 kg
European Championships
Bronze medal – third place	2012 Chelyabinsk	+100 kg
Bronze medal – third place	2014 Montpellier	+100 kg
IJF Grand Prix
Gold medal – first place	2012 Qingdao	+100 kg
Gold medal – first place	2014 Samsun	+100 kg
Silver medal – second place	2011 Amsterdam	+100 kg
Silver medal – second place	2014 Budapest	+100 kg
European Junior Championships
Silver medal – second place	1998 Bucharest	‍–‍100 kg

Profile at external databases
- IJF: 535
- JudoInside.com: 3077
- Updated on 28 August 2023

Marius Paškevičius (born 31 October 1979) is a Lithuanian judoka.

== Achievements ==
Year	Tournament	Place	Weight class
2000	Olympic Games	AC	(-100 kg)
2008	European Championships	7th	(+100 kg)
2009	World Championships	3rd	(+100 kg)
2010	European Championships	5th	(+100 kg)
2012	European Championships	3rd	(+100 kg)

He achieved semi-finals in the heavyweight division at the 2015 European Judo Championships, which coincided with the 2015 European Games, losing to the eventual Gold medal winner Adam Okruashvili of Georgia.

On November 1, 2015, he competed in Grand Slam judo in Abu Dhabi, winning at least one round by ippon.
