= Martin Padar =

Estonian judoka (born 1979)

Personal information
- Born: 11 April 1979 (age 47)
- Occupation: Judoka

Sport
- Country: Estonia
- Sport: Judo
- Weight class: ‍–‍100 kg, +100 kg, Open

Achievements and titles
- Olympic Games: R16 (2008)
- World Champ.: 5th (2009)
- European Champ.: (gold) (2009)
Medal record
Men's judo
Representing Estonia
European Championships
Gold medal – first place	2009 Tbilisi	+100 kg
Silver medal – second place	2002 Maribor	‍–‍100 kg
Bronze medal – third place	2005 Moscow	Open
Bronze medal – third place	2006 Novi Sad	Open
Bronze medal – third place	2007 Warsaw	Open
Bronze medal – third place	2011 Istanbul	+100 kg
IJF Grand Slam
Bronze medal – third place	2009 Moscow	+100 kg
Bronze medal – third place	2009 Tokyo	+100 kg
Bronze medal – third place	2010 Paris	+100 kg
World Juniors Championships
Bronze medal – third place	1998 Cali	‍–‍100 kg

Profile at external databases
- IJF: 6
- JudoInside.com: 332
- Updated on 15 November 2022

Martin Padar (born 11 April 1979 in Tallinn) is an Estonian judoka, who has competed in the men's half heavyweight (‍–‍100 kg) and later in the heavyweight (+100 kg) category. A 2009 European champion, he has also competed at two Olympics, the 2008 Beijing Olympics and the 2012 London Olympics.

== Achievements ==
Year	Tournament	Place	Weight class
2011	European Judo Championships	3rd	Heavyweight (+100 kg)
2009	European Judo Championships	1st	Heavyweight (+100 kg)
2007	European Open Championships	3rd	Open class
2006	European Judo Championships	5th	Heavyweight (+100 kg)
2006	European Open Championships	3rd	Open class
2005	World Judo Championships	7th	Open class
2005	European Judo Championships	7th	Heavyweight (+100 kg)
2005	European Open Championships	3rd	Open class
2003	European Judo Championships	5th	Heavyweight (+100 kg)
2002	European Judo Championships	2nd	Half heavyweight (100 kg)

== Personal ==
Politician Ivari Padar is Martin Padar's cousin.

Summer Olympics
Preceded by Erki Nool	Flagbearer for Estonia; Beijing 2008	Succeeded by Aleksander Tammert
