= Janusz Wojnarowicz =

Polish judoka (born 1980)

Personal information
- Born: 14 April 1980 (age 46)
- Occupation: Judoka

Sport
- Country: Poland
- Sport: Judo
- Weight class: +100 kg

Achievements and titles
- Olympic Games: 13th (2008)
- World Champ.: 7th (2003)
- European Champ.: (silver) (2005, 2006)
Medal record
Men's judo
Representing Poland
European Championships
Silver medal – second place	2005 Rotterdam	+100 kg
Silver medal – second place	2006 Tampere	+100 kg
Bronze medal – third place	2002 Maribor	+100 kg
Bronze medal – third place	2010 Vienna	+100 kg
Bronze medal – third place	2011 Istanbul	+100 kg
Bronze medal – third place	2012 Chelyabinsk	+100 kg
IJF Grand Slam
Bronze medal – third place	2011 Moscow	+100 kg
Bronze medal – third place	2011 Rio de Janeiro	+100 kg

Profile at external databases
- IJF: 753
- JudoInside.com: 8346
- Updated on 14 November 2022

Janusz Wojnarowicz (born 14 April 1980 in Tychy) is former Polish judoka and an American football player for the Gliwice Lions, a team in the PLFA I. He's also related to Polish football player Jakub Błaszczykowski.

== Achievements ==
Year	Tournament	Place	Weight class
2012	European Judo Championships	3rd	Heavyweight (+100 kg)
2011	European Judo Championships	3rd	Heavyweight (+100 kg)
2010	European Judo Championships	3rd	Heavyweight (+100 kg)
2009	European Judo Championships	5th	Heavyweight (+100 kg)
2008	European Championships	7th	Heavyweight (+100 kg)
2006	European Judo Championships	2nd	Heavyweight (+100 kg)
2005	European Judo Championships	2nd	Heavyweight (+100 kg)
2003	World Judo Championships	7th	Heavyweight (+100 kg)
2003	World Judo Championships	7th	Open class
2003	European Judo Championships	7th	Heavyweight (+100 kg)
2003	European Judo Championships	7th	Open class
2002	European Judo Championships	3rd	Heavyweight (+100 kg)
2002	European Judo Championships	7th	Open class
