= 2010 European Judo Championships =

2010 Judo European Judo Championships
- Venue: Ferry-Dusika-Hallenstadion
- Location: Vienna, Austria
- Dates: 22–25 April 2010
- Competitors: 297 from 44 nations

Champions
- Men's team: Georgia (4th title)
- Women's team: Italy (1st title)

Competition at external databases
- Links: IJF • EJU • JudoInside

The 2010 European Judo Championships were held at the Ferry-Dusika-Hallenstadion, in Vienna, Austria, from 22 to 25 April 2010. Vladimir Putin attended this event.

== Medal overview ==
=== Men ===
Event	Gold	Silver	Bronze
–60 kg	Sofiane Milous (FRA)	Ludwig Paischer (AUT)	Jeroen Mooren (NED) Elio Verde (ITA)
–66 kg	Sugoi Uriarte (ESP)	Miklós Ungvári (HUN)	Rok Drakšič (SLO) Andreas Mitterfellner (AUT)
–73 kg	João Pina (POR)	Batradz Kaitmazov (RUS)	Ugo Legrand (FRA) Attila Ungvári (HUN)
–81 kg	Sirazhudin Magomedov (RUS)	Aliaksandr Stsiashenka (BLR)	Euan Burton (GBR) Guillaume Elmont (NED)
–90 kg	Marcus Nyman (SWE)	Varlam Liparteliani (GEO)	Ilias Iliadis (GRE) Elkhan Mammadov (AZE)
–100 kg	Elco van der Geest (BEL)	Henk Grol (NED)	Benjamin Behrla (GER) Ariel Ze'evi (ISR)
+100 kg	Ihar Makarau (BLR)	Barna Bor (HUN)	Janusz Wojnarowicz (POL) Andreas Tölzer (GER)
Teams	Georgia; David Asumbani; Shalva Kardava; Zaza Kedelashvili; Levan Tsiklauri; Varlam Liparteliani; Lasha Gujejiani	France; Loïc Korval; Sofiane Milous; Ugo Legrand; Antoine Jeannin; Romain Buffet; Teddy Riner	Russia; Alim Gadanov; Mansur Isaev; Ivan Nifontov; Kirill Denisov; Dmitry Sterkhov Romania; Dan Fâșie; Costel Danculea; Marian Halas; Valentin Radu; Daniel Brata

=== Women ===
Event	Gold	Silver	Bronze
–48 kg	Alina Dumitru (ROU)	Éva Csernoviczki (HUN)	Oiana Blanco (ESP) Charline Van Snick (BEL)
–52 kg	Natalia Kuziutina (RUS)	Rosalba Forciniti (ITA)	Pénélope Bonna (FRA) Ilse Heylen (BEL)
–57 kg	Corina Căprioriu (ROU)	Sabrina Filzmoser (AUT)	Hedvig Karakas (HUN) Telma Monteiro (POR)
–63 kg	Elisabeth Willeboordse (NED)	Edwige Gwend (ITA)	Vlora Beđeti (SLO) Vera Koval (RUS)
–70 kg	Anett Mészáros (HUN)	Raša Sraka (SLO)	Cecilia Blanco (ESP) Juliane Robra (SUI)
–78 kg	Abigél Joó (HUN)	Marhinde Verkerk (NED)	Lucie Louette (FRA) Maryna Pryshchepa (UKR)
+78 kg	Lucija Polavder (SVN)	Tea Donguzashvili (RUS)	Karina Bryant (GBR) Urszula Sadkowska (POL)
Teams	Italy; Rosalba Forciniti; Giulia Quintavalle; Edwige Gwend; Erica Barbieri; Jennifer Pitzanti; Assunta Galeone	Poland; Marta Kubań; Małgorzata Bielak; Monika Chrościelewska; Katarzyna Kłys; Urszula Sadkowska	France; Pénélope Bonna; Morgane Ribout; Gévrise Émane; Mylène Chollet; Éva Bisséni; Lucie Louette Ukraine; Mariia Buiok; Tetyana Lusnikova; Anna Nikitina; Svetlana Chepurina; Nataliya Smal; Svitlana Iaromka

=== Medal table ===
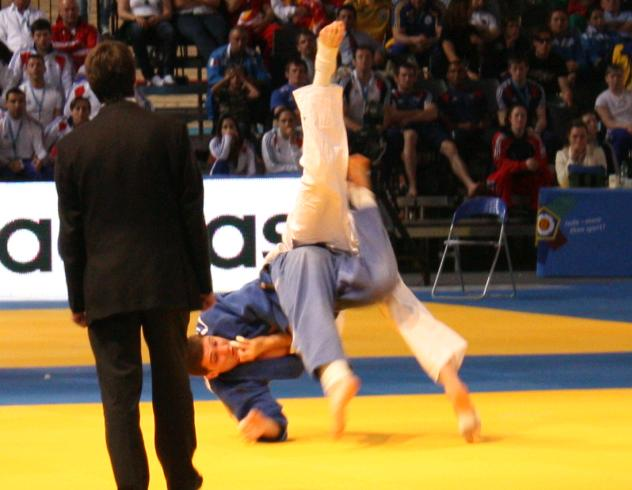
Varlam Liparteliani (GEO) winning his fight in the final of the team competition.

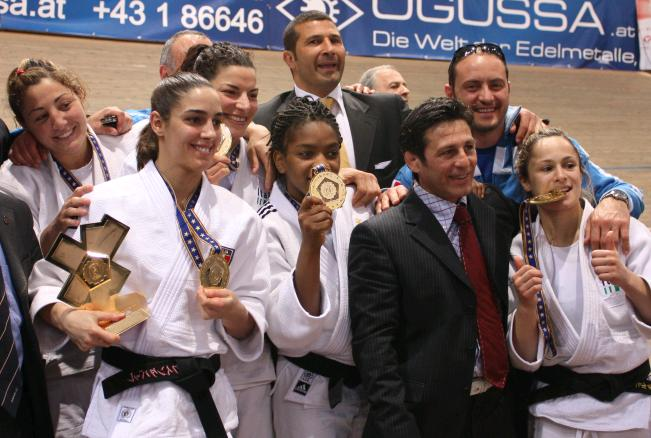
Italy celebrating their women's team gold medal.

* Host nation (Austria)

Rank	Nation	Gold	Silver	Bronze	Total
1	Hungary	2	3	2	7
2	Russia	2	2	2	6
3	Romania	2	0	1	3
4	Netherlands	1	2	2	5
5	Italy	1	2	1	4
6	France	1	1	4	6
7	Slovenia	1	1	2	4
8	Belarus	1	1	0	2
8	Georgia	1	1	0	2
10	Belgium	1	0	2	3
10	Spain	1	0	2	3
12	Portugal	1	0	1	2
13	Sweden	1	0	0	1
14	Austria*	0	2	1	3
15	Poland	0	1	2	3
16	Germany	0	0	2	2
16	Great Britain	0	0	2	2
16	Ukraine	0	0	2	2
19	Azerbaijan	0	0	1	1
19	Greece	0	0	1	1
19	Israel	0	0	1	1
19	Switzerland	0	0	1	1
Totals (22 entries)		16	16	32	64

== Results overview ==
=== Men ===
==== –60 kg ====
Position	Judoka	Country
1.	Sofiane Milous	FRA
2.	Ludwig Paischer	AUT
3.	Jeroen Mooren	NED
3.	Elio Verde	ITA
5.	Hovhannes Davtyan	ARM
5.	Beslan Mudranov	RUS
7.	Georgii Zantaraia	UKR
7.	Pavel Petříkov	CZE

==== –66 kg ====
Position	Judoka	Country
1.	Sugoi Uriarte	ESP
2.	Miklós Ungvári	HUN
3.	Rok Drakšič	SLO
3.	Andreas Mitterfellner	AUT
5.	Dan Fâșie	ROU
5.	Loïc Korval	FRA
7.	Armen Nazaryan	ARM
7.	Deniss Kozlovs	LAT

==== –73 kg ====
Position	Judoka	Country
1.	João Pina	POR
2.	Batradz Kaitmazov	RUS
3.	Ugo Legrand	FRA
3.	Attila Ungvári	HUN
5.	Dirk Van Tichelt	BEL
5.	Zaza Kedelashvili	GEO
7.	Krzysztof Wiłkomirski	POL
7.	Daniel Williams	GBR

==== –81 kg ====
Position	Judoka	Country
1.	Sirazhudin Magomedov	RUS
2.	Aliaksandr Stsiashenka	BLR
3.	Guillaume Elmont	NED
3.	Euan Burton	GBR
5.	Antoine Jeannin	FRA
5.	Levan Tsiklauri	GEO
7.	Sergiu Toma	MDA
7.	Aljaž Sedej	SLO

==== –90 kg ====
Position	Judoka	Country
1.	Marcus Nyman	SWE
2.	Varlam Liparteliani	GEO
3.	Ilias Iliadis	GRE
3.	Elkhan Mammadov	AZE
5.	Karolis Bauža	LTU
5.	Max Schirnhofer	AUT
7.	Matthew Purssey	GBR
7.	Milan Randl	SVK

==== –100 kg ====
Position	Judoka	Country
1.	Elco van der Geest	BEL
2.	Henk Grol	NED
3.	Benjamin Behrla	GER
3.	Ariel Ze'evi	ISR
5.	Artem Bloshenko	UKR
5.	Yauhen Biadulin	BLR
7.	Levan Zhorzholiani	GEO
7.	Lukas Krpálek	CZE

==== +100 kg ====
Position	Judoka	Country
1.	Ihar Makarau	BLR
2.	Barna Bor	HUN
3.	Janusz Wojnarowicz	POL
3.	Andreas Tölzer	GER
5.	Marius Paškevičius	LTU
5.	Zviadi Khanjaliashvili	GEO
7.	Stanislav Bondarenko	UKR
7.	Renat Saidov	RUS

==== Teams ====
Position	Country
1.	Georgia
2.	France
3.	Romania
3.	Russia
5.	Italy
5.	Poland
7.	Moldova
7.	Ukraine

=== Women ===
==== –48 kg ====
Position	Judoka	Country
1.	Alina Dumitru	ROU
2.	Éva Csernoviczki	HUN
3.	Oiana Blanco	ESP
3.	Charline Van Snick	BEL
5.	Lyudmila Bogdanova	RUS
5.	Valentina Moscatt	ITA
7.	Derya Cıbır	TUR
7.	Kelly Edwards	GBR

==== –52 kg ====
Position	Judoka	Country
1.	Natalia Kuziutina	RUS
2.	Rosalba Forciniti	ITA
3.	Pénélope Bonna	FRA
3.	Ilse Heylen	BEL
5.	Mareen Kraeh	GER
5.	Aynur Samat	TUR
7.	Kitty Bravik	NED
7.	Lucie Chytrá	CZE

==== –57 kg ====
Position	Judoka	Country
1.	Corina Căprioriu	ROU
2.	Sabrina Filzmoser	AUT
3.	Telma Monteiro	POR
3.	Hedvig Karakas	HUN
5.	Giulia Quintavalle	ITA
5.	Juul Franssen	NED
7.	Concepción Bellorín	ESP
7.	Jovana Rogic	SER

==== –63 kg ====
Position	Judoka	Country
1.	Elisabeth Willeboordse	NED
2.	Edwige Gwend	ITA
3.	Vlora Beđeti	SLO
3.	Vera Koval	RUS
5.	Claudia Ahrens	GER
5.	Svetlana Chepurina	UKR
7.	Yahaira Aguirre	ESP
7.	Faith Pitman	GBR

==== –70 kg ====
Position	Judoka	Country
1.	Anett Mészáros	HUN
2.	Raša Sraka	SLO
3.	Cecilia Blanco	ESP
3.	Juliane Robra	SUI
5.	Mylène Chollet	FRA
5.	Linda Bolder	NED
7.	Olesya Ovseichuk	RUS
7.	Iljana Marzok	GER

==== –78 kg ====
Position	Judoka	Country
1.	Abigel Joo	HUN
2.	Marhinde Verkerk	NED
3.	Lucie Louette	FRA
3.	Maryna Pryshchepa	UKR
5.	Assunta Galeone	ITA
5.	Daria Pogorzelec	POL
7.	Luise Malzahn	GER
7.	Ana Velensek	SLO

==== +78 kg ====
Position	Judoka	Country
1.	Lucija Polavder	SLO
2.	Tea Donguzashvili	RUS
3.	Karina Bryant	GBR
3.	Urszula Sadkowska	POL
5.	Gülşah Kocatürk	TUR
5.	Lucia Tangorre	ITA
7.	Franziska Konitz	GER
7.	Larisa Ceric	BIH

==== Teams ====
Position	Country
1.	Italy
2.	Poland
3.	France
3.	Ukraine
5.	United Kingdom
5.	Spain
7.	Portugal
7.	Russia
