= 2011 European Judo Championships =

2011 Judo European Judo Championships
- Venue: Abdi İpekçi Arena
- Location: Istanbul, Turkey
- Dates: 21–24 April 2011
- Competitors: 422 from 45 nations

Champions
- Men's team: Ukraine (1st title)
- Women's team: France (18th title)

Competition at external databases
- Links: IJF • EJU • JudoInside

The 2011 European Judo Championships were held at the Abdi İpekçi Arena in Istanbul, Turkey, from 21 to 24 April 2011.

== Medal overview ==
=== Men ===
| Event | Gold | Silver | Bronze |
|---|---|---|---|
| −60 kg | (Ukraine) Georgii Zantaraia | (Georgia (country)) Betkil Shukvani | (Russia) Arsen Galstyan (Italy) Elio Verde |
| −66 kg | (Hungary) Miklós Ungvári | (Azerbaijan) Tarlan Karimov | (Russia) Alim Gadanov (United Kingdom) Colin Oates |
| −73 kg | (Portugal) João Pina | (Russia) Murat Kodzokov | (Czech Republic) Jaromír Ježek (Turkey) Hasan Vanlıoğlu |
| −81 kg | (Azerbaijan) Elnur Mammadli | (Moldova) Sergiu Toma | (Russia) Sirazhudin Magomedov (Germany) Ole Bischof |
| −90 kg | (Greece) Ilias Of Nikos Iliadis | (Russia) Kirill Denisov | (Georgia (country)) Varlam Liparteliani (Sweden) Marcus Nyman |
| −100 kg | (Bosnia and Herzegovina) Amel Mekić | (Georgia (country)) Levan Zhorzholiani | (Latvia) Jevgeņijs Borodavko (Georgia (country)) Irakli Tsirekidze |
| +100 kg | (France) Teddy Riner | (Hungary) Barna Bor | (Estonia) Martin Padar (Poland) Janusz Wojnarowicz |
| Teams | Ukraine; Serhiy Drebot; Georgii Zantaraia; Volodymyr Soroka; Artem Vasylenko; Viktor Savinov; Roman Gontyuk; Valentin Grekov; Stanislav Bondarenko; Artem Bloshenko | France; Pierre Duprat; David Larose; Ugo Legrand; Benjamin Darbelet; Loïc Pietri; Anthony Laignes; Matthieu Dafreville; Teddy Riner | Georgia; Shalva Kardava; Nugzari Tatalashvili; Avtandili Tchrikishvili; Levan Tsiklauri; Varlam Liparteliani; Zviadi Khanjaliashvili; Aleksandre Mskhaladze Germany; Robert Kopiske; Christopher Völk; Sven Maresch; Christophe Lambert; Dimitri Peters; Robert Zimmermann |

=== Women ===
| Event | Gold | Silver | Bronze |
|---|---|---|---|
| −48 kg | (Romania) Alina Dumitru | (Hungary) Éva Csernoviczki | (France) Frédérique Jossinet (France) Laëtitia Payet |
| −52 kg | (France) Pénélope Bonna | (Portugal) Joana Ramos | (Spain) Ana Carrascosa (United Kingdom) Sophie Cox |
| −57 kg | (Austria) Sabrina Filzmoser | (Portugal) Telma Monteiro | (Russia) Irina Zabludina (Romania) Corina Căprioriu |
| −63 kg | (France) Gévrise Émane | (Netherlands) Anicka van Emden | (Slovenia) Urska Zolnir (Austria) Hilde Drexler |
| −70 kg | (Netherlands) Edith Bosch | (Spain) Cecilia Blanco | (France) Lucie Décosse (Italy) Erica Barbieri |
| −78 kg | (France) Audrey Tcheuméo | (France) Lucie Louette | (Germany) Luise Malzahn (Slovenia) Ana Velensek |
| +78 kg | (Russia) Elena Ivashchenko | (France) Anne Sophie Mondiere | (Russia) Tea Donguzashvili (Slovenia) Lucija Polavder |
| Teams | France; Priscilla Gneto; Pénélope Bonna; Automne Pavia; Gévrise Émane; Lucie Décosse; Anne-Sophíe Mondíère | Germany; Romy Tarangul; Miryam Roper; Viola Wächter; Claudia Malzahn; Iljana Marzok; Franziska Konitz; Luise Malzahn | Turkey; Aynur Samat; Nazlıcan Özerler; Selda Karadağ; Büşra Katipoğlu; Şeyda Bayram; Belkıs Zehra Kaya; Gülşah Kocatürk Ukraine; Mariia Buiok; Tetiana Levytska-Shukvani; Anna Nikitina; Oksana Didenko; Nataliya Smal; Iryna Kindzerska |

=== Medal table ===
* Host nation (Turkey)

| Rank | Nation | Gold | Silver | Bronze | Total |
|---|---|---|---|---|---|
| 1 | France | 5 | 3 | 3 | 11 |
| 2 | Ukraine | 2 | 0 | 1 | 3 |
| 3 | Russia | 1 | 2 | 5 | 8 |
| 4 | Hungary | 1 | 2 | 0 | 3 |
| 4 | Portugal | 1 | 2 | 0 | 3 |
| 6 | Azerbaijan | 1 | 1 | 0 | 2 |
| 6 | Netherlands | 1 | 1 | 0 | 2 |
| 8 | Austria | 1 | 0 | 1 | 2 |
| 8 | Romania | 1 | 0 | 1 | 2 |
| 10 | Bosnia and Herzegovina | 1 | 0 | 0 | 1 |
| 10 | Greece | 1 | 0 | 0 | 1 |
| 12 | Georgia | 0 | 2 | 3 | 5 |
| 13 | Germany | 0 | 1 | 3 | 4 |
| 14 | Spain | 0 | 1 | 1 | 2 |
| 15 | Moldova | 0 | 1 | 0 | 1 |
| 16 | Slovenia | 0 | 0 | 3 | 3 |
| 17 | Great Britain | 0 | 0 | 2 | 2 |
| 17 | Italy | 0 | 0 | 2 | 2 |
| 17 | Turkey* | 0 | 0 | 2 | 2 |
| 20 | Czech Republic | 0 | 0 | 1 | 1 |
| 20 | Estonia | 0 | 0 | 1 | 1 |
| 20 | Latvia | 0 | 0 | 1 | 1 |
| 20 | Poland | 0 | 0 | 1 | 1 |
| 20 | Sweden | 0 | 0 | 1 | 1 |
| Totals (24 entries) | | 16 | 16 | 32 | 64 |

== Results overview ==
=== Men ===
==== –60 kg ====
| Position | Judoka | Country |
|---|---|---|
| 1. | Georgii Zantaraia | UKR |
| 2. | Betkil Shukvani | GEO |
| 3. | Arsen Galstyan | RUS |
| 3. | Elio Verde | ITA |
| 5. | Tobias Englmaier | GER |
| 5. | Amiran Papinashvili | GEO |
| 7. | Elnur Aliev | EST |
| 7. | Ilgar Mushkiyev | AZE |

==== –66 kg ====
| Position | Judoka | Country |
|---|---|---|
| 1. | Miklós Ungvári | HUN |
| 2. | Tarlan Karimov | AZE |
| 3. | Alim Gadanov | RUS |
| 3. | Colin Oates | GBR |
| 5. | Pierre Duprat | FRA |
| 5. | Musa Mogushkov | RUS |
| 7. | Dan Gheorghe Fasie | ROU |
| 7. | Sergiy Pliyev | UKR |

==== –73 kg ====
| Position | Judoka | Country |
|---|---|---|
| 1. | João Pina | POR |
| 2. | Murat Kodzokov | RUS |
| 3. | Jaromír Ježek | CZE |
| 3. | Hasan Vanlıoğlu | TUR |
| 5. | Benjamin Darbelet | FRA |
| 5. | Peter Scharinger | AUT |
| 7. | Kiyoshi Uematsu | ESP |
| 7. | Dex Elmont | NED |

==== –81 kg ====
| Position | Judoka | Country |
|---|---|---|
| 1. | Elnur Mammadli | AZE |
| 2. | Sergiu Toma | MDA |
| 3. | Sirazhudin Magomedov | RUS |
| 3. | Ole Bischof | GER |
| 5. | Tomislav Marijanović | CRO |
| 5. | Alain Schmitt | FRA |
| 7. | Jaromir Musil | CZE |
| 7. | Antonio Ciano | ITA |

==== –90 kg ====
| Position | Judoka | Country |
|---|---|---|
| 1. | Ilias Iliadis | GRE |
| 2. | Kirill Denisov | RUS |
| 3. | Varlam Liparteliani | GEO |
| 3. | Marcus Nyman | SWE |
| 5. | Robert Krawczyk | POL |
| 5. | Milan Randl | SVK |
| 7. | Yunus Emre Bayındır | TUR |
| 7. | Grigori Minaskin | EST |

==== –100 kg ====
| Position | Judoka | Country |
|---|---|---|
| 1. | Amel Mekić | BIH |
| 2. | Levan Zhorzholiani | GEO |
| 3. | Jevgeņijs Borodavko | LAT |
| 3. | Irakli Tsirekidze | GEO |
| 5. | Lukas Krpalek | POL |
| 5. | Cyril Maret | FRA |
| 7. | Dino Pfeiffer | GER |
| 7. | Ariel Ze'evi | ISR |

==== +100 kg ====
| Position | Judoka | Country |
|---|---|---|
| 1. | Teddy Riner | FRA |
| 2. | Barna Bor | HUN |
| 3. | Martin Padar | EST |
| 3. | Janusz Wojnarowicz | POL |
| 5. | Stanislav Bondarenko | UKR |
| 5. | Zviadi Khanjaliashvili | GEO |
| 7. | Zohar Asaf | ISR |
| 7. | Andrey Volkov | RUS |

==== Teams ====
| Position | Team | Country |
|---|---|---|
| 1. | Ukraine | UKR |
| 2. | France | FRA |
| 3. | Georgia | GEO |
| 3. | Germany | GER |
| 5. | Estonia | EST |
| 5. | Poland | POL |
| 7. | Greece | GRE |
| 7. | United Kingdom | GBR |

=== Women ===
==== –48 kg ====
| Position | Judoka | Country |
|---|---|---|
| 1. | Alina Alexandra Dumitru | ROU |
| 2. | Éva Csernoviczki | HUN |
| 3. | Frédérique Jossinet | FRA |
| 3. | Laëtitia Payet | FRA |
| 5. | Oiana Blanco | ESP |
| 5. | Liudmila Bogdanova | RUS |
| 7. | Nataliya Kondratyeva | RUS |
| 7. | Séverine Pesch | GER |

==== –52 kg ====
| Position | Judoka | Country |
|---|---|---|
| 1. | Pénélope Bonna | FRA |
| 2. | Joana Ramos | POR |
| 3. | Ana Carrascosa | ESP |
| 3. | Sophie Cox | GBR |
| 5. | Jaana Sundberg | FIN |
| 5. | Romy Tarangul | GER |
| 7. | Ilse Heylen | BEL |
| 7. | Marie Muller | LUX |

==== –57 kg ====
| Position | Judoka | Country |
|---|---|---|
| 1. | Sabrina Filzmoser | AUT |
| 2. | Telma Monteiro | POR |
| 3. | Irina Zabludina | RUS |
| 3. | Corina Oana Căprioriu | ROU |
| 5. | Kifayat Gasimova | AZE |
| 5. | Giulia Quintavalle | ITA |
| 7. | Automne Pavia | FRA |
| 7. | Viola Wächter | GER |

==== –63 kg ====
| Position | Judoka | Country |
|---|---|---|
| 1. | Gévrise Émane | FRA |
| 2. | Anicka van Emden | NED |
| 3. | Urska Zolnir | SLO |
| 3. | Hilde Drexler | AUT |
| 5. | Yarden Gerbi | ISR |
| 5. | Alice Schlesinger | ISR |
| 7. | Vera Koval | RUS |
| 7. | Tina Trstenjak | SLO |

==== –70 kg ====
| Position | Judoka | Country |
|---|---|---|
| 1. | Edith Bosch | NED |
| 2. | Cecilia Blanco | ESP |
| 3. | Lucie Décosse | FRA |
| 3. | Erica Barbieri | ITA |
| 5. | Anett Meszaros | HUN |
| 5. | Raša Sraka | SLO |
| 7. | Linda Bolder | NED |
| 7. | Kerstin Thiele | GER |

==== –78 kg ====
| Position | Judoka | Country |
|---|---|---|
| 1. | Audrey Tcheuméo | FRA |
| 2. | Lucie Louette | FRA |
| 3. | Luise Malzahn | GER |
| 3. | Ana Velenšek | SLO |
| 5. | Abigel Joo | HUN |
| 5. | Anastasiya Matrosova | UKR |
| 7. | Raquel Prieto Madrigal | ESP |
| 7. | Maryna Pryshchepa | UKR |

==== +78 kg ====
| Position | Judoka | Country |
|---|---|---|
| 1. | Elena Ivashchenko | RUS |
| 2. | Anne Sophie Mondiere | FRA |
| 3. | Tea Donguzashvili | RUS |
| 3. | Lucija Polavder | SLO |
| 5. | Ketty Mathe | FRA |
| 5. | Urszula Sadkowska | POL |
| 7. | Iryna Kindzerska | UKR |
| 7. | Franziska Konitz | GER |

==== Teams ====
| Position | Team | Country |
|---|---|---|
| 1. | France | FRA |
| 2. | Germany | GER |
| 3. | Turkey | TUR |
| 3. | Ukraine | UKR |
| 5. | Russia | RUS |
| 5. | Spain | ESP |
| 7. | Poland | POL |
| 7. | United Kingdom | GBR |
