= 2007 European Judo Championships =

2007 Judo European Judo Championships
- Venue: Belgrade Arena
- Location: Belgrade, Serbia
- Dates: 6–8 April 2007

Competition at external databases
- Links: JudoInside

The 2007 European Judo Championships were the 18th edition of the European Judo Championships, and were held in Belgrade, Serbia from 6 April to 8 April 2007.

== Medal overview ==
=== Men ===
Event	Gold	Silver	Bronze
60 kg	(Russia) Ruslan Kishmakhov	(Armenia) Hovhannes Davtyan	(Georgia (country)) Nestor Khergiani (Israel) Gal Yekutiel
66 kg	(Georgia (country)) Zaza Kedelashvili	(Serbia) Miloš Mijalković	(Poland) Tomasz Adamiec (France) Benjamin Darbelet
73 kg	(Russia) Salamu Mezhidov	(Georgia (country)) David Kevkhishvili	(Bulgaria) Georgi Georgiev (Belarus) Kanstantsin Siamionau
81 kg	(Poland) Robert Krawczyk	(Belarus) Siarhei Shundzikau	(United Kingdom) Euan Burton (Netherlands) Guillaume Elmont
90 kg	(Ukraine) Valentyn Grekov	(Georgia (country)) Irakli Tsirekidze	(Spain) David Alarza (Italy) Roberto Meloni
100 kg	(Hungary) Dániel Hadfi	(Russia) Ruslan Gasimov	(France) Frédéric Demontfaucon (Israel) Ariel Ze'evi
+100 kg	(France) Teddy Riner	(Georgia (country)) Lasha Gujejiani	(Russia) Alexander Mikhaylin (Germany) Andreas Tölzer

=== Women ===
Event	Gold	Silver	Bronze
48 kg	(Romania) Alina Alexandra Dumitru	(Italy) Valentina Moscatt	(Spain) Vanesa Arenas Comerón (France) Frédérique Jossinet
52 kg	(Portugal) Telma Monteiro	(France) Audrey La Rizza	(Belgium) Ilse Heylen (Slovenia) Petra Nareks
57 kg	(Spain) Isabel Fernández	(Germany) Yvonne Bönisch	(Austria) Sabrina Filzmoser (Azerbaijan) Kifayat Gasimova
63 kg	(France) Lucie Décosse	(Slovenia) Urška Žolnir	(Austria) Claudia Heill (Germany) Anna von Harnier
70 kg	(France) Gévrise Émane	(Poland) Katarzyna Piłocik	(Netherlands) Edith Bosch (Ukraine) Maryna Pryshchepa
78 kg	(France) Stéphanie Possamaï	(Russia) Vera Moskalyuk	(United Kingdom) Michelle Rogers (Spain) Esther San Miguel
+78 kg	(France) Anne-Sophie Mondière	(Netherlands) Carola Uilenhoed	(Russia) Tea Donguzashvili (Slovenia) Lucija Polavder

=== Medal table ===
Rank	Nation	Gold	Silver	Bronze	Total
1	France	5	1	3	9
2	Russia	2	2	2	6
3	Georgia	1	3	1	5
4	Poland	1	1	1	3
5	Spain	1	0	3	4
6	Ukraine	1	0	1	2
7	Hungary	1	0	0	1
7	Portugal	1	0	0	1
7	Romania	1	0	0	1
10	Germany	0	1	2	3
10	Netherlands	0	1	2	3
10	Slovenia	0	1	2	3
13	Belarus	0	1	1	2
13	Italy	0	1	1	2
15	Armenia	0	1	0	1
15	Serbia	0	1	0	1
17	Austria	0	0	2	2
17	Great Britain	0	0	2	2
17	Israel	0	0	2	2
20	Azerbaijan	0	0	1	1
20	Belgium	0	0	1	1
20	Bulgaria	0	0	1	1

== Results overview ==
=== Men ===
==== 60 kg ====
Position	Judoka	Country
1.	Ruslan Kishmakhov	Russia
2.	Hovhannes Davtyan	Armenia
3.	Nestor Khergiani	Georgia
3.	Gal Yekutiel	Israel
5.	Nijat Shikhalizade	Azerbaijan
5.	Albert Techov	Lithuania
7.	László Burján	Hungary
7.	Rok Drakšič	Slovenia

==== 66 kg ====
Position	Judoka	Country
1.	Zaza Kedelashvili	Georgia
2.	Miloš Mijalković	Serbia
3.	Tomasz Adamiec	Poland
3.	Benjamin Darbelet	France
5.	Dex Elmont	Netherlands
5.	Miklós Ungvári	Hungary
7.	Ramil Gasimov	Azerbaijan
7.	Tariel Zidiridis	Greece

==== 73 kg ====
Position	Judoka	Country
1.	Salamu Mezhidov	Russia
2.	David Kevkhishvili	Georgia
3.	Georgi Georgiev	Bulgaria
3.	Kanstantsin Siamionau	Belarus
5.	Victor Bivol	Moldova
5.	João Pina	Portugal
7.	Claudiu Baștea	Romania
7.	David Papaux	Switzerland

==== 81 kg ====
Position	Judoka	Country
1.	Robert Krawczyk	Poland
2.	Siarhei Shundzikau	Belarus
3.	Euan Burton	Great Britain
3.	Guillaume Elmont	Netherlands
5.	Ole Bischof	Germany
5.	Klemen Ferjan	Slovenia
7.	Giorgi Baindurashvili	Georgia
7.	Avisar Sheinmann	Israel

==== 90 kg ====
Position	Judoka	Country
1.	Valentyn Grekov	Ukraine
2.	Irakli Tsirekidze	Georgia
3.	David Alarza	Spain
3.	Roberto Meloni	Italy
5.	Andrei Kazusionak	Belarus
5.	Michael Pinske	Germany
7.	Jevgeņijs Borodavko	Latvia
7.	Ivan Pershin	Russia

==== 100 kg ====
Position	Judoka	Country
1.	Dániel Hadfi	Hungary
2.	Ruslan Gasymov	Russia
3.	Frédéric Demontfaucon	France
3.	Ariel Ze'evi	Israel
5.	Elco van der Geest	Netherlands
5.	Levan Zhorzholiani	Georgia
7.	Movlud Miraliyev	Azerbaijan
7.	Dimitri Peters	Germany

==== +100 kg ====
Position	Judoka	Country
1.	Teddy Riner	France
2.	Lasha Gujejiani	Georgia
3.	Alexander Mikhaylin	Russia
3.	Andreas Tölzer	Germany
5.	Matjaž Ceraj	Slovenia
5.	Yevgen Sotnikov	Ukraine
7.	Ángel Parra	Spain
7.	Yury Rybak	Belarus

=== Women ===
==== 48 kg ====
Position	Judoka	Country
1.	Alina Alexandra Dumitru	Romania
2.	Valentina Moscatt	Italy
3.	Vanesa Arenas Comerón	Spain
3.	Frédérique Jossinet	France
5.	Michaela Baschin	Germany
5.	Olha Sukha	Ukraine
7.	Leen Dom	Belgium
7.	Ana Hormigo	Portugal

==== 52 kg ====
Position	Judoka	Country
1.	Telma Monteiro	Portugal
2.	Audrey La Rizza	France
3.	Ilse Heylen	Belgium
3.	Petra Nareks	Slovenia
5.	Ioana Maria Aluaș	Romania
5.	Aynur Samat	Turkey
7.	Antonia Cuomo	Italy
7.	Romy Tarangul	Germany

==== 57 kg ====
Position	Judoka	Country
1.	Isabel Fernández	Spain
2.	Yvonne Bönisch	Germany
3.	Sabrina Filzmoser	Austria
3.	Kifayat Gasimova	Azerbaijan
5.	Anna Nikitina	Ukraine
5.	Natalia Yukhareva	Russia
7.	Deborah Gravenstijn	Netherlands
7.	Inga Kołodziej	Poland

==== 63 kg ====
Position	Judoka	Country
1.	Lucie Décosse	France
2.	Urška Žolnir	Slovenia
3.	Claudia Heill	Austria
3.	Anna von Harnier	Germany
5.	Sara Álvarez	Spain
5.	Sarah Clark	Great Britain
7.	Paulina Raińczuk	Poland
7.	Ylenia Scapin	Italy

==== 70 kg ====
Position	Judoka	Country
1.	Gévrise Émane	France
2.	Katarzyna Piłocik	Poland
3.	Edith Bosch	Netherlands
3.	Maryna Pryshchepa	Ukraine
5.	Catherine Jacques	Belgium
5.	Heide Wollert	Germany
7.	Cecilia Blanco	Spain
7.	Anett Mészáros	Hungary

==== 78 kg ====
Position	Judoka	Country
1.	Stéphanie Possamaï	France
2.	Vera Moskalyuk	Russia
3.	Michelle Rogers	Great Britain
3.	Esther San Miguel	Spain
5.	Sviatlana Tsimashenka	Belarus
5.	Katarzyna Wróbel	Poland
7.	Regina Jernejc	Slovenia
7.	Lucia Morico	Italy

==== +78 kg ====
Position	Judoka	Country
1.	Anne-Sophie Mondière	France
2.	Carola Uilenhoed	Netherlands
3.	Tea Donguzashvili	Russia
3.	Lucija Polavder	Slovenia
5.	Maryna Prokofyeva	Ukraine
5.	Urszula Sadkowska	Poland
7.	Gülşah Kocatürk	Turkey
7.	Michela Torrenti	Italy
