= Audrey La Rizza =

French Olympic judoka

Personal information
- Nationality: French
- Born: 21 April 1981 (age 45) Grenoble, France
- Occupation: Judoka
- Height: 1.60 m (5 ft 3 in)

Sport
- Country: France
- Sport: Judo
- Weight class: –52 kg
- Club: US Orleans Judo
- Coached by: Christophe Brunet; Cathy Fleury

Achievements and titles
- Olympic Games: R32 (2008)
- World Champ.: R16 (2007)
- European Champ.: (silver) (2007)
Medal record
Women's judo
Representing France
European Championships
Silver medal – second place	2007 Belgrade	–52 kg
IJF Grand Slam
Silver medal – second place	2009 Paris	–52 kg
Silver medal – second place	2009 Rio de Janeiro	–52 kg
World Juniors Championships
Silver medal – second place	2000 Nabeul	–52 kg
Summer Universiade
Gold medal – first place	2003 Jeju	–52 kg

Profile at external databases
- IJF: 2312
- JudoInside.com: 11900
- Updated on 17 November 2022

Audrey La Rizza (born 21 April 1981) is a French judoka, who competes in the half-lightweight category (−52 kg). She won a gold medal at the 2003 Summer Universiade and a silver at the 2007 European Judo Championships in Belgrade, Serbia. She is also a member of US Orleans Judo Club, and is coached and trained by Christophe Brunet and Cathy Fleury.

At the 2008 Olympics she lost the first preliminary match to Olympic bronze medalist Ilse Heylen of Belgium.
