= Salamu Mezhidov =

Russian judoka

Personal information
- Full name: Salamu Sultanovich Mezhidov
- Born: 10 February 1981 (age 45) Argun, Chechnya, Russia
- Occupation: Judoka

Sport
- Country: Russia
- Sport: Judo
- Weight class: –73 kg

Achievements and titles
- Olympic Games: R32 (2008)
- World Champ.: 9th (2007)
- European Champ.: (gold) (2007)
Medal record
Men's judo
Representing Russia
European Championships
Gold medal – first place	2007 Belgrade	–73 kg
Bronze medal – third place	2006 Tampere	–73 kg

Profile at external databases
- IJF: 5244
- JudoInside.com: 29115
- Updated on 16 November 2022

Salamu Sultanovich Mezhidov (Russian: Саламу Султанович Межидов; born 10 February 1981 in Argun, Chechnya) is a Russian judoka.

== Achievements ==
Year	Tournament	Place	Weight class
2007	European Judo Championships	1st	Lightweight (73 kg)
2006	European Judo Championships	3rd	Lightweight (73 kg)
