= Ruslan Gasimov =

Russian judoka

Personal information
- Born: 8 November 1979 (age 46)
- Occupation: Judoka

Sport
- Country: Russia
- Sport: Judo
- Weight class: –100 kg

Achievements and titles
- Olympic Games: R32 (2008)
- World Champ.: R32 (2007)
- European Champ.: (gold) (2006)
Medal record
Men's judo
Representing Russia
European Championships
Gold medal – first place	2006 Tampere	–100 kg
Silver medal – second place	2007 Belgrade	–100 kg
Bronze medal – third place	2005 Rotterdam	–100 kg

Profile at external databases
- IJF: 28595
- JudoInside.com: 28969
- Updated on 16 November 2022

Ruslan Gasimov (Azerbaijani: Ruslan Qasımov; Russian: Руслан Гасымов, born 8 November 1979 in Leningrad) is an ethnic Azerbaijani judoka from Russia.

== Achievements ==
Year	Tournament	Place	Weight class
2007	European Judo Championships	2nd	Half heavyweight (100 kg)
2006	European Judo Championships	1st	Half heavyweight (100 kg)
2005	European Judo Championships	3rd	Half heavyweight (100 kg)
