= 2009 Judo Grand Prix Tunis =

Judo competition

Judo 2009 Judo Grand Prix Tunis
- Location: Tunis, Tunisia
- Dates: 9–10 May 2009
- Competitors: 226 from 32 nations

Competition at external databases
- Links: IJF • EJU • JudoInside

The 2009 Judo Grand Prix Tunis was held in Tunis, Tunisia from 9 to 10 May 2009.

== Medal summary ==
=== Men's events ===
| Event | Gold | Silver | Bronze |
|---|---|---|---|
| Extra-lightweight (−60 kg) | Jeroen Mooren (NED) | Damien Bomboir (BEL) | Gabit Esimbetov (UZB) |
| Extra-lightweight (−60 kg) | Jeroen Mooren (NED) | Damien Bomboir (BEL) | Ludwig Paischer (AUT) |
| Half-lightweight (−66 kg) | Sugoi Uriarte (ESP) | Serhiy Drebot (UKR) | Ahmed Awad (EGY) |
| Half-lightweight (−66 kg) | Sugoi Uriarte (ESP) | Serhiy Drebot (UKR) | Hevorh Hevorhyan (UKR) |
| Lightweight (−73 kg) | Bryan van Dijk (NED) | Mohamed Riad (FRA) | Tomasz Adamiec (POL) |
| Lightweight (−73 kg) | Bryan van Dijk (NED) | Mohamed Riad (FRA) | Dirk Van Tichelt (BEL) |
| Half-middleweight (−81 kg) | Ole Bischof (GER) | Khvicha Khutsishvili (GEO) | Yasuhiro Ebi (JPN) |
| Half-middleweight (−81 kg) | Ole Bischof (GER) | Khvicha Khutsishvili (GEO) | Aliaksandr Stsiashenka (BLR) |
| Middleweight (−90 kg) | Lorenzo Bagnoli (ITA) | Valentyn Grekov (UKR) | Michael Pinske (GER) |
| Middleweight (−90 kg) | Lorenzo Bagnoli (ITA) | Valentyn Grekov (UKR) | Tamás Madarász (HUN) |
| Half-heavyweight (−100 kg) | Elco van der Geest (NED) | Dimitri Peters (GER) | Benjamin Behrla (GER) |
| Half-heavyweight (−100 kg) | Elco van der Geest (NED) | Dimitri Peters (GER) | Ramadan Darwish (EGY) |
| Heavyweight (+100 kg) | Anis Chedly (TUN) | Andreas Tölzer (GER) | Barna Bor (HUN) |
| Heavyweight (+100 kg) | Anis Chedly (TUN) | Andreas Tölzer (GER) | Zviadi Khanjaliashvili (GEO) |

=== Women's events ===
| Event | Gold | Silver | Bronze |
|---|---|---|---|
| Extra-lightweight (−48 kg) | Haruna Asami (JPN) | Chahnez M'barki (TUN) | Nataliya Kondratyeva (RUS) |
| Extra-lightweight (−48 kg) | Haruna Asami (JPN) | Chahnez M'barki (TUN) | Mayumi Takara (JPN) |
| Half-lightweight (−52 kg) | Chiho Kagaya (JPN) | Amani Khalfaoui (TUN) | Marine Richard (FRA) |
| Half-lightweight (−52 kg) | Chiho Kagaya (JPN) | Amani Khalfaoui (TUN) | Romy Tarangul (GER) |
| Lightweight (−57 kg) | Nae Udaka (JPN) | Sabrina Filzmoser (AUT) | Bernadett Baczkó (HUN) |
| Lightweight (−57 kg) | Nae Udaka (JPN) | Sabrina Filzmoser (AUT) | Hedvig Karakas (HUN) |
| Half-middleweight (−63 kg) | Urška Žolnir (SLO) | Miki Tanaka (JPN) | Irina Gromova (RUS) |
| Half-middleweight (−63 kg) | Urška Žolnir (SLO) | Miki Tanaka (JPN) | Marielle Pruvost (FRA) |
| Middleweight (−70 kg) | Raša Sraka (SLO) | Anett Mészáros (HUN) | Gévrise Émane (FRA) |
| Middleweight (−70 kg) | Raša Sraka (SLO) | Anett Mészáros (HUN) | Mina Watanabe (JPN) |
| Half-heavyweight (−78 kg) | Vera Moskalyuk (RUS) | Tomomi Okamura (JPN) | Anastasiia Matrosova (UKR) |
| Half-heavyweight (−78 kg) | Vera Moskalyuk (RUS) | Tomomi Okamura (JPN) | Catherine Roberge (CAN) |
| Heavyweight (+78 kg) | Lucija Polavder (SLO) | Maryna Prokofyeva (UKR) | Tea Donguzashvili (RUS) |

Source Results

=== Medal table ===
* Host nation (Tunisia)

| Rank | Nation | Gold | Silver | Bronze | Total |
|---|---|---|---|---|---|
| 1 | Japan (JPN) | 3 | 2 | 3 | 8 |
| 2 | Netherlands (NED) | 3 | 0 | 0 | 3 |
| 2 | Slovenia (SLO) | 3 | 0 | 0 | 3 |
| 4 | Germany (GER) | 1 | 2 | 3 | 6 |
| 5 | Tunisia (TUN)* | 1 | 2 | 0 | 3 |
| 6 | Russia (RUS) | 1 | 0 | 3 | 4 |
| 7 | Italy (ITA) | 1 | 0 | 0 | 1 |
| 7 | Spain (ESP) | 1 | 0 | 0 | 1 |
| 9 | Ukraine (UKR) | 0 | 3 | 2 | 5 |
| 10 | Hungary (HUN) | 0 | 1 | 4 | 5 |
| 11 | France (FRA) | 0 | 1 | 3 | 4 |
| 12 | Austria (AUT) | 0 | 1 | 1 | 2 |
| 12 | Belgium (BEL) | 0 | 1 | 1 | 2 |
| 12 | Georgia (GEO) | 0 | 1 | 1 | 2 |
| 15 | Egypt (EGY) | 0 | 0 | 2 | 2 |
| 16 | Belarus (BLR) | 0 | 0 | 1 | 1 |
| 16 | Canada (CAN) | 0 | 0 | 1 | 1 |
| 16 | Poland (POL) | 0 | 0 | 1 | 1 |
| 16 | Uzbekistan (UZB) | 0 | 0 | 1 | 1 |
| Totals (19 entries) | | 14 | 14 | 27 | 55 |
