= 2009 Judo Grand Prix Abu Dhabi =

Judo competition

Judo 2009 Judo Grand Prix Abu Dhabi
- Location: Abu Dhabi, United Arab Emirates
- Dates: 20–21 November 2009
- Competitors: 117 from 34 nations

Competition at external databases
- Links: IJF • JudoInside

The 2009 Judo Grand Prix Abu Dhabi was held in Abu Dhabi, United Arab Emirates from 20 to 21 November 2009.

== Medal summary ==
=== Men's events ===
Event	Gold	Silver	Bronze
Extra-lightweight (−60 kg)	Georgii Zantaraia (UKR)	Ludwig Paischer (AUT)	Jeroen Mooren (NED)
Extra-lightweight (−60 kg)	Georgii Zantaraia (UKR)	Ludwig Paischer (AUT)	Rishod Sobirov (UZB)
Half-lightweight (−66 kg)	Masashi Ebinuma (JPN)	Ulugbek Norkobilov (UZB)	Jasper de Jong (NED)
Half-lightweight (−66 kg)	Masashi Ebinuma (JPN)	Ulugbek Norkobilov (UZB)	Andreas Mitterfellner (AUT)
Lightweight (−73 kg)	Dirk Van Tichelt (BEL)	Krzysztof Wiłkomirski (POL)	Tomasz Adamiec (POL)
Lightweight (−73 kg)	Dirk Van Tichelt (BEL)	Krzysztof Wiłkomirski (POL)	Volodymyr Soroka (UKR)
Half-middleweight (−81 kg)	Robert Krawczyk (POL)	Guillaume Elmont (NED)	Sándor Nagysolymosi (HUN)
Half-middleweight (−81 kg)	Robert Krawczyk (POL)	Guillaume Elmont (NED)	Elkhan Rajabli (AZE)
Middleweight (−90 kg)	Dilshod Choriev (UZB)	Yuya Yoshida (JPN)	Elkhan Mammadov (AZE)
Middleweight (−90 kg)	Dilshod Choriev (UZB)	Yuya Yoshida (JPN)	Hesham Mesbah (EGY)
Half-heavyweight (−100 kg)	Tagir Khaybulaev (RUS)	Ramadan Darwish (EGY)	Benjamin Behrla (GER)
Half-heavyweight (−100 kg)	Tagir Khaybulaev (RUS)	Ramadan Darwish (EGY)	Daniel Brata (ROU)
Heavyweight (+100 kg)	Islam El Shehaby (EGY)	Abdullo Tangriev (UZB)	Daiki Kamikawa (JPN)
Heavyweight (+100 kg)	Islam El Shehaby (EGY)	Abdullo Tangriev (UZB)	Grim Vuijsters (NED)

=== Women's events ===
Event	Gold	Silver	Bronze
Extra-lightweight (−48 kg)	Éva Csernoviczki (HUN)	Carmen Bogdan (ROU)	Mahitab Farouk (EGY)
Extra-lightweight (−48 kg)	Éva Csernoviczki (HUN)	Carmen Bogdan (ROU)	Laëtitia Payet (FRA)
Half-lightweight (−52 kg)	Laura Gómez (ESP)	Ilse Heylen (BEL)	Pénélope Bonna (FRA)
Lightweight (−57 kg)	Barbara Harel (FRA)	Corina Căprioriu (ROU)	Concepción Bellorín (ESP)
Lightweight (−57 kg)	Barbara Harel (FRA)	Corina Căprioriu (ROU)	Giulia Quintavalle (ITA)
Half-middleweight (−63 kg)	Gévrise Émane (FRA)	Nozomi Hirai (JPN)	Sabrina Filzmoser (AUT)
Middleweight (−70 kg)	Anett Mészáros (HUN)	Tomoe Ueno (JPN)	Chen Fei (CHN)
Middleweight (−70 kg)	Anett Mészáros (HUN)	Tomoe Ueno (JPN)	Houda Miled (TUN)
Half-heavyweight (−78 kg)	Céline Lebrun (FRA)	Maryna Pryshchepa (UKR)	Tomomi Okamura (JPN)
Half-heavyweight (−78 kg)	Céline Lebrun (FRA)	Maryna Pryshchepa (UKR)	Esther San Miguel (ESP)
Heavyweight (+78 kg)	Qin Qian (CHN)	Maryna Prokofyeva (UKR)	Nihel Cheikh Rouhou (TUN)

Source Results

=== Medal table ===
* Host nation (United Arab Emirates)

Rank	Nation	Gold	Silver	Bronze	Total
1	France (FRA)	3	0	2	5
2	Hungary (HUN)	2	0	1	3
3	Japan (JPN)	1	3	2	6
4	Ukraine (UKR)	1	2	1	4
4	Uzbekistan (UZB)	1	2	1	4
6	Egypt (EGY)	1	1	2	4
7	Poland (POL)	1	1	1	3
8	Belgium (BEL)	1	1	0	2
9	Spain (ESP)	1	0	2	3
10	China (CHN)	1	0	1	2
11	Russia (RUS)	1	0	0	1
12	Romania (ROU)	0	2	1	3
13	Netherlands (NED)	0	1	3	4
14	Austria (AUT)	0	1	2	3
15	Azerbaijan (AZE)	0	0	2	2
15	Tunisia (TUN)	0	0	2	2
17	Germany (GER)	0	0	1	1
17	Italy (ITA)	0	0	1	1
Totals (18 entries)		14	14	25	53
