= Andreas Mitterfellner =

Austrian judoka (born 1981)

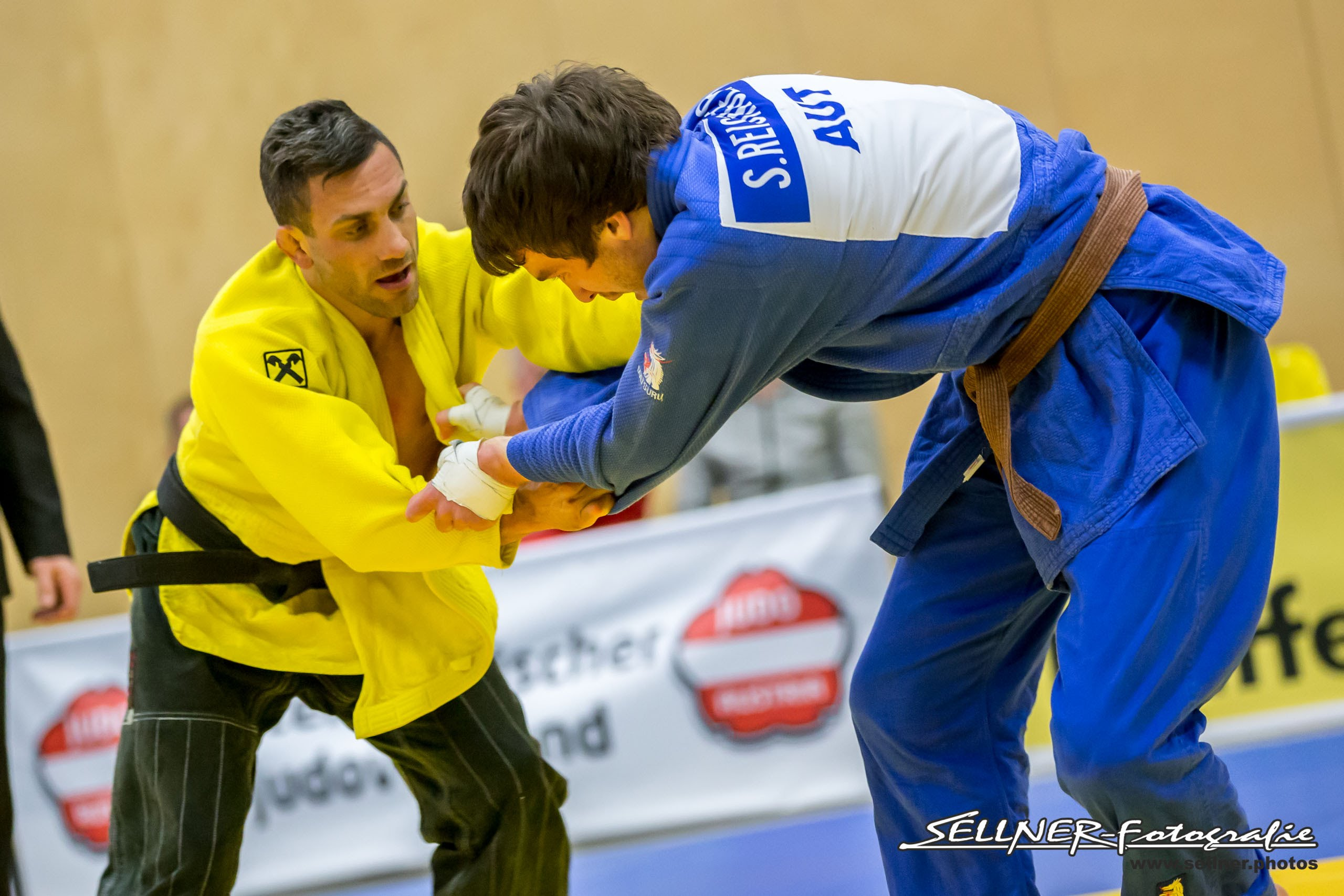
- Andreas Mitterfellner (yellow-black)

Personal information
- Born: 17 June 1981 (age 45)
- Occupation: Judoka
- Website: www.andreasmitterfellner.at

Sport
- Country: Austria
- Sport: Judo
- Weight class: ‍–‍66 kg
- Rank: 2nd dan black belt
- Club: JU Pinzgau

Achievements and titles
- World Champ.: 7th (2007)
- European Champ.: (bronze) (2006, 2010)
Medal record
Men's judo
Representing Austria
European Championships
Bronze medal – third place	2006 Tampere	‍–‍66 kg
Bronze medal – third place	2010 Vienna	‍–‍66 kg
IJF Grand Prix
Bronze medal – third place	2009 Abu Dhabi	‍–‍66 kg
European Junior Championships
Bronze medal – third place	1999 Rome	‍–‍66 kg

Profile at external databases
- IJF: 393
- JudoInside.com: 3213
- Updated on 15 November 2022

Andreas Mitterfellner (born 17 June 1981) is an Austrian judoka.

Andreas Mitterfellner has been working as a freelance personal coach and physiotherapist in Salzburg since 2013.

== Achievements ==
Year	Tournament	Place	Weight class
2007	World Judo Championships	7th	Half lightweight (66 kg)
2006	European Judo Championships	3rd	Half lightweight (66 kg)
2004	European Judo Championships	5th	Half lightweight (66 kg)
