= Benny Behrla =

German judoka (born 1985)

Personal information
- Full name: Benjamin Behrla
- Born: 31 August 1985 (age 40) Emsdetten, West Germany
- Occupation: Judoka
- Height: 192 cm (6 ft 4 in)

Sport
- Country: Germany
- Sport: Judo
- Weight class: –100 kg
- Club: SU Witten-Annen
- Coached by: Andreas Reeh, Oliver Rychter, Frank Wieneke, Daniel Gürschner

Achievements and titles
- Olympic Games: 9th (2008)
- European Champ.: (bronze) (2008, 2010)
Medal record
Men's judo
Representing Germany
European Championships
Bronze medal – third place	2008 Lisbon	–100 kg
Bronze medal – third place	2010 Vienna	–100 kg
IJF Grand Prix
Bronze medal – third place	2009 Tunis	–100 kg
Bronze medal – third place	2009 Abu Dhabi	–100 kg
Bronze medal – third place	2011 Abu Dhabi	–100 kg
European U23 Championships
Bronze medal – third place	2006 Moscow	–100 kg
World Juniors Championships
Bronze medal – third place	2004 Budapest	–100 kg

Profile at external databases
- IJF: 989
- JudoInside.com: 15622
- Updated on 15 November 2022

Benjamin Behrla (born 31 August 1985 in Emsdetten), known as Benny Behrla, is a German judoka.

Competing in the –100 kg weight division, Behrla won bronze medals at the 2008 and 2010 European Judo Championships. He competed at the 2008 Summer Olympics, finishing in 9th place overall.

== Achievements ==
Year	Tournament	Place	Weight class
2008	European Championships	3rd	Half heavyweight (–100 kg)
2010	European Championships	3rd	Half heavyweight (–100 kg)
