= Faith Pitman =

British judoka (born 1985)

Personal information
- Nationality: British
- Born: 4 May 1985 (age 41) Halifax, England
- Occupation: Judoka
- Height: 5 ft 4 in (163 cm)

Sport
- Country: England
- Sport: Judo
- Weight class: ‍–‍63 kg

Achievements and titles
- World Champ.: 7th (2007)
- European Champ.: 7th (2010)
- Commonwealth Games: (bronze) (2014)
Medal record
Women's judo
Representing Great Britain
IJF Grand Prix
Gold medal – first place	2013 Rijeka	‍–‍63 kg
European U23 Championships
Bronze medal – third place	2007 Salzburg	‍–‍57 kg
European Junior Championships
Bronze medal – third place	2004 Sofia	‍–‍63 kg
Representing England
Commonwealth Games
Bronze medal – third place	2014 Glasgow	‍–‍63 kg

Profile at external databases
- IJF: 110
- JudoInside.com: 12922
- Updated on 27 December 2022

Faith Pitman (born 4 May 1985) is a British judoka. She competed for England in the women's 63 kg event at the 2014 Commonwealth Games where she won a bronze medal. Faith Pitman has won a total of 11 Gold medals, 6 silver medals and 21 bronze medals in her career. She placed 7th in the 2007 World Championships in Rio de Janeiro at 57 kg. She also placed first in the women's under 63 kg at the 2008 World Cup in Birmingham, England. Pitman won bronze medals for the 2004 U20 and the 2007 U23 European Championships and was the women's under 63 kg British Champion in 2013.
