= Sabrina Filzmoser =

Austrian judoka (born 1980)

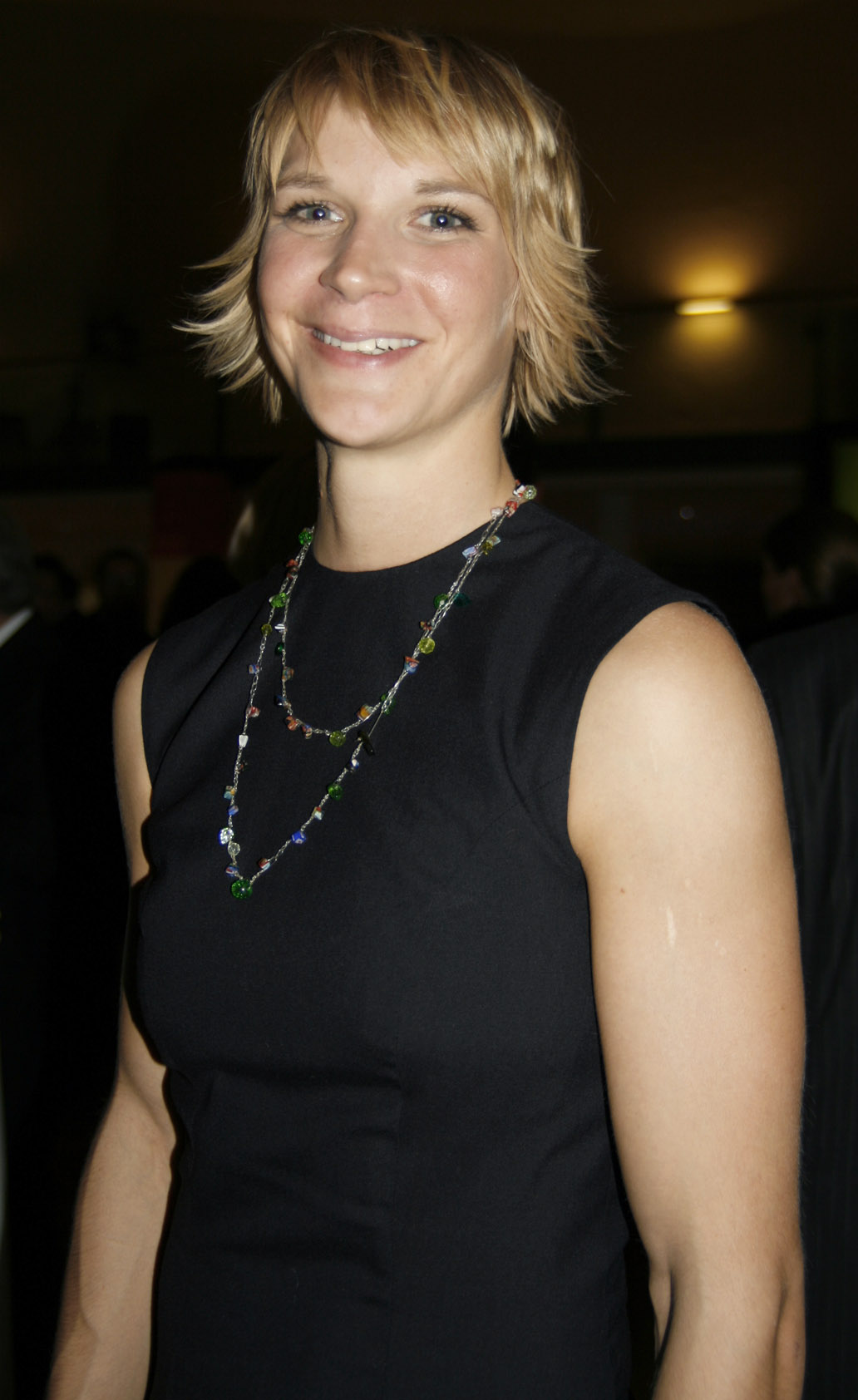
- Sabrina Filzmoser in 2008

Personal information
- Nickname: Sabsi
- Nationality: Austrian
- Born: 12 June 1980 (age 46) Wels, Austria
- Occupation: Judoka

Sport
- Country: Austria
- Sport: Judo
- Weight class: ‍–‍57 kg
- Rank: 6th dan black belt
- Club: LZ Wels

Achievements and titles
- Olympic Games: 7th (2012)
- World Champ.: (bronze) (2005, 2010)
- European Champ.: (gold) (2008, 2011)
Medal record
Women's judo
Representing Austria
World Championships
Bronze medal – third place	2005 Cairo	‍–‍57 kg
Bronze medal – third place	2010 Tokyo	‍–‍57 kg
European Championships
Gold medal – first place	2008 Lisbon	‍–‍57 kg
Gold medal – first place	2011 Istanbul	‍–‍57 kg
Silver medal – second place	2010 Vienna	‍–‍57 kg
Silver medal – second place	2013 Budapest	‍–‍57 kg
Bronze medal – third place	2003 Düsseldorf	‍–‍57 kg
Bronze medal – third place	2005 Rotterdam	‍–‍57 kg
Bronze medal – third place	2006 Tampere	‍–‍57 kg
Bronze medal – third place	2007 Belgrade	‍–‍57 kg
Bronze medal – third place	2014 Montpellier	‍–‍57 kg
IJF Grand Slam
Gold medal – first place	2010 Moscow	‍–‍57 kg
Gold medal – first place	2014 Baku	‍–‍57 kg
Bronze medal – third place	2009 Rio de Janeiro	‍–‍57 kg
Bronze medal – third place	2010 Rio de Janeiro	‍–‍57 kg
Bronze medal – third place	2011 Moscow	‍–‍57 kg
Bronze medal – third place	2013 Moscow	‍–‍57 kg
Bronze medal – third place	2014 Tyumen	‍–‍57 kg
Bronze medal – third place	2014 Abu Dhabi	‍–‍57 kg
Bronze medal – third place	2015 Paris	‍–‍57 kg
Bronze medal – third place	2016 Baku	‍–‍57 kg
IJF Grand Prix
Gold medal – first place	2010 Abu Dhabi	‍–‍57 kg
Gold medal – first place	2013 Samsun	‍–‍57 kg
Silver medal – second place	2009 Tunis	‍–‍57 kg
Silver medal – second place	2010 Tunis	‍–‍57 kg
Silver medal – second place	2014 Havana	‍–‍57 kg
Silver medal – second place	2014 Astana	‍–‍57 kg
Bronze medal – third place	2009 Abu Dhabi	‍–‍63 kg
Bronze medal – third place	2011 Baku	‍–‍57 kg
Bronze medal – third place	2017 Cancún	‍–‍57 kg
Bronze medal – third place	2018 Antalya	‍–‍57 kg
Bronze medal – third place	2019 Budapest	‍–‍57 kg
European Junior Championships
Gold medal – first place	1998 Bucharest	‍–‍52 kg
Silver medal – second place	1999 Rome	‍–‍52 kg
Bronze medal – third place	1997 Ljubljana	‍–‍52 kg

Profile at external databases
- IJF: 219
- JudoInside.com: 494
- Updated on 25 July 2023

Sabrina Filzmoser (born 12 June 1980 in Wels) is an Austrian retired judoka. She is a two-time bronze medalist at the World Judo Championships and she has also won medals, including two golds, in her event at the European Judo Championships. She competed at the 2008, 2012, 2016, and 2020 Summer Olympics.

Filzmoser had her last appearance as an ÖJV national team athlete at the 2023 Judo Grand Prix Linz. After an Ippon victory against Maýsa Pardaýewa, she was eliminated in the second round. During this event she was awarded 6th Dan.
