= Yuliya Barysik =

Belarusian judoka (born 1984)

Personal information
- Born: 11 February 1984 (age 42)
- Occupation: Judoka

Sport
- Country: Belarus
- Sport: Judo
- Weight class: +78 kg

Achievements and titles
- World Champ.: 5th (2005, 2007)
- European Champ.: (bronze) (2016, 2016 open)
Medal record
Men's judo
Representing Belarus
European Championships
Bronze medal – third place	2006 Tampere	+78 kg
Bronze medal – third place	2006 Novi Sad	Open
European U23 Championships
Silver medal – second place	2006 Moscow	+78 kg
World Juniors Championships
Silver medal – second place	2002 Jeju	+78 kg
European Junior Championships
Bronze medal – third place	2002 Rotterdam	+78 kg
Bronze medal – third place	2003 Sarajevo	+78 kg
European Cadet Championships
Bronze medal – third place	2000 Oradea	+70 kg

Profile at external databases
- IJF: 64475
- JudoInside.com: 12614
- Updated on 10 February 2022

Yuliya Barysik (born 11 February 1984) is a Belarusian judoka.

== Achievements ==
Year	Tournament	Place	Weight class
2008	European Championships	7th	Heavyweight (+78 kg)
2007	World Championships	5th	Open class
2006	European Championships	3rd	Heavyweight (+78 kg)
2005	World Championships	5th	Open class
2005	European Championships	5th	Heavyweight (+78 kg)
2004	European Championships	7th	Heavyweight (+78 kg)
