= Peter Cousins =

British judoka

Personal information
- Born: 3 March 1981 (age 45)
- Occupation: Judoka

Sport
- Sport: Judo
- Weight class: –100 kg

Achievements and titles
- Olympic Games: R32 (2008)
- World Champ.: (silver) (2007)
- European Champ.: (bronze) (2006)
Medal record
Men's judo
Representing Great Britain
World Championships
Silver medal – second place	2007 Rio de Janeiro	–100 kg
European Championships
Bronze medal – third place	2006 Tampere	–100 kg
World Juniors Championships
Silver medal – second place	2000 Nabeul	–90 kg
European Junior Championships
Gold medal – first place	2000 Nicosia	–90 kg
Bronze medal – third place	1999 Rome	–90 kg

Profile at external databases
- IJF: 103
- JudoInside.com: 307
- Updated on 17 February 2022

Peter Tendai Cousins (born 3 March 1981 in Harlow) is a British judoka, who competed at the Olympic Games.

== Judo career ==
Cousins came to prominence after becoming champion of Great Britain, winning the middleweight division at the British Judo Championships in 1999. He then followed this up by winning three consecutive British titles in 2001, 2002 and 2003.

Two years later in 2005, he won a fifth British title before securing a bronze medal at the 2006 European Judo Championships, in Tampere. One year later in 2007, he won a silver medal at the 2007 World Judo Championships in Rio de Janeiro. He lost the gold medal match against the home judoka Luciano Corrêa. The performance inevitably resulted in selection for Great Britain at the 2008 Summer Olympics in Beijing. He competed in the half-heavyweight category and was eliminated in the first round. At this heavier weight he won two more British titles in 2008 and 2012.

== Achievements ==
Year	Tournament	Place	Weight class
2006	European Championships	3rd	Half heavyweight (100 kg)
2007	World Championships	2nd	Half heavyweight (100 kg)
2008	European Championships	5th	Half heavyweight (100 kg)

== Personal life ==
His twin brother Thomas Cousins is also a British judoka, who competed at the Commonwealth Games.
