= Magdalena Kozioł =

Polish judoka

Personal information
- Born: 14 September 1981 (age 44)
- Occupation: Judoka

Sport
- Country: Poland
- Sport: Judo
- Weight class: +78 kg

Achievements and titles
- World Champ.: 5th (2003)
- European Champ.: 7th (2004, 2007)
Medal record
Women's judo
Representing Poland
European Junior Championships
Silver medal – second place	2000 Nicosia	+78 kg

Profile at external databases
- IJF: 58597
- JudoInside.com: 1124
- Updated on 17 February 2022

Magdalena Kozioł (born 14 September 1981) is a Polish judoka.

== Achievements ==
Year	Tournament	Place	Weight class
2007	European Open Championships	7th	Open class
2004	European Championships	7th	Heavyweight (+78 kg)
2003	World Championships	5th	Open class
