= Kanstantsin Siamionau =

Belarusian judoka (born 1978)

Personal information
- Born: 22 October 1978 (age 48)
- Occupation: Judoka

Sport
- Country: Belarus
- Sport: Judo
- Weight class: ‍–‍73 kg

Achievements and titles
- Olympic Games: 13th (2008)
- World Champ.: 7th (2007)
- European Champ.: (bronze) (2007)
Medal record
Men's judo
Representing Belarus
European Championships
Bronze medal – third place	2007 Belgrade	‍–‍73 kg
European Junior Championships
Silver medal – second place	1997 Ljubljana	‍–‍71 kg
Summer Universiade
Bronze medal – third place	2001 Beijing	‍–‍73 kg

Profile at external databases
- IJF: 52678
- JudoInside.com: 8268
- Updated on 17 November 2022

Kanstantsin Siamionau (born 22 October 1978) is a Belarusian judoka.

== Achievements ==
Year	Tournament	Place	Weight class
2008	European Judo Championships	7th	Lightweight (73 kg)
2007	World Judo Championships	7th	Lightweight (73 kg)
2007	European Judo Championships	3rd	Lightweight (73 kg)
2006	European Judo Championships	5th	Lightweight (73 kg)
2001	Universiade	3rd	Lightweight (73 kg)
