= Ivan Pershin =

Russian judoka (born 1980)

Personal information
- Full name: Ivan Vasilevich Pershin
- Born: 25 January 1980 (age 46)
- Occupation: Judoka

Sport
- Country: Russia
- Sport: Judo
- Weight class: ‍–‍90 kg

Achievements and titles
- Olympic Games: 5th (2008)
- World Champ.: (bronze) (2007)
- European Champ.: (gold) (2006)
Medal record
Men's judo
Representing Russia
World Championships
Bronze medal – third place	2007 Rio de Janeiro	‍–‍90 kg
European Championships
Gold medal – first place	2006 Tampere	‍–‍90 kg
European Junior Championships
Silver medal – second place	1999 Rome	‍–‍81 kg

Profile at external databases
- IJF: 2287
- JudoInside.com: 596
- Updated on 17 November 2022

Ivan Vasilevich Pershin (Russian: Иван Васильевич Першин, born 25 January 1980) is a Russian judoka.

Pershin was born in Arkhangelsk.

At the 2008 Summer Olympics Pershin was eliminated in the semifinals of the 90 kg competition after losing his fight to the upcoming gold medalist Irakli Tsirekidze. And he lost the following bronze medal fight to Sergei Aschwanden.

== Achievements ==
Year	Tournament	Place	Weight class
2009	European Judo Championships	7th	Middleweight (90 kg)
2008	2008 Summer Olympics	5th	Middleweight (90 kg)
2007	World Judo Championships	3rd	Middleweight (90 kg)
2007	European Judo Championships	7th	Middleweight (90 kg)
2006	European Judo Championships	1st	Middleweight (90 kg)
