= Ludwig Paischer =

Austrian judoka (born 1981)

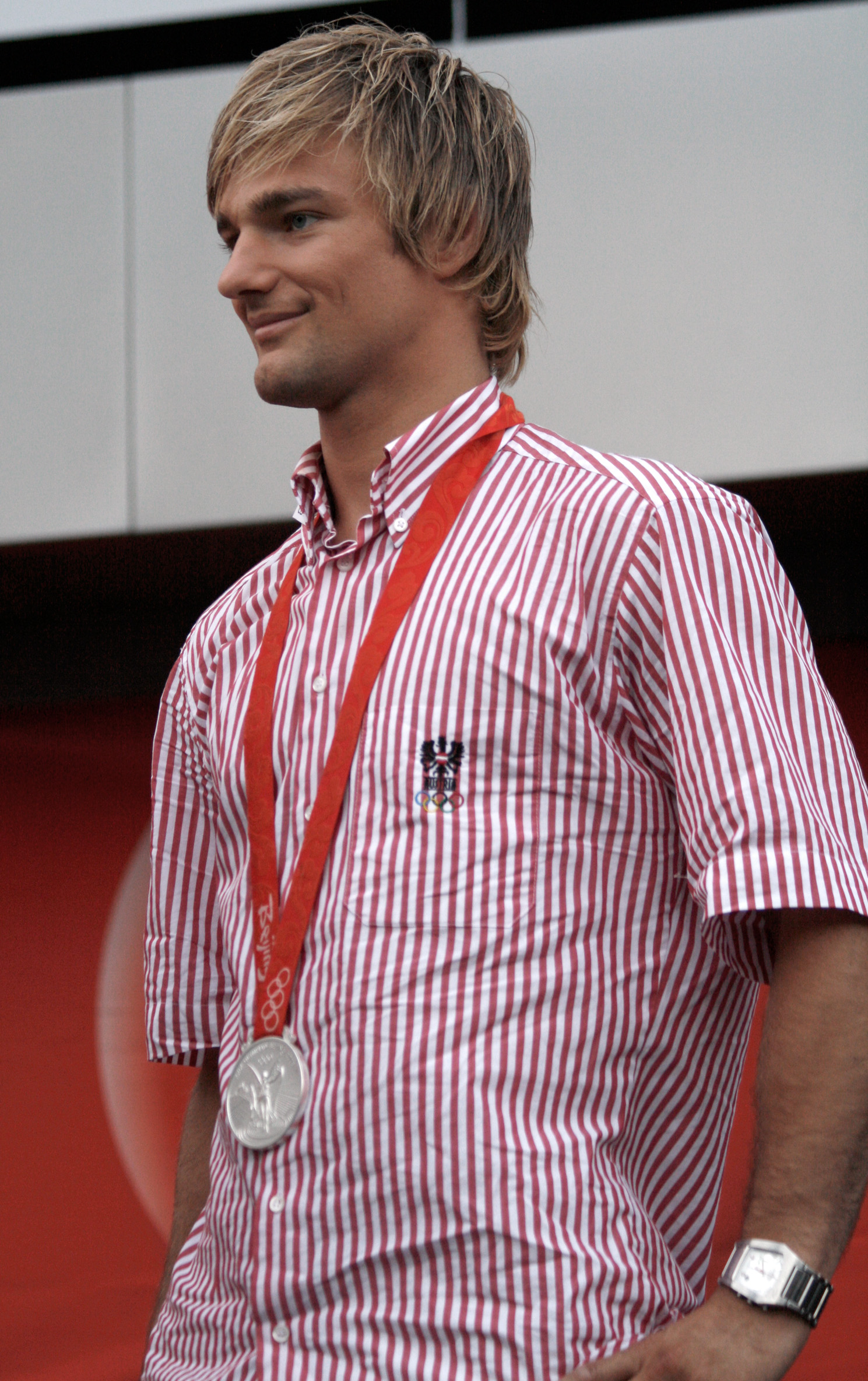
- Ludwig Paischer with his medal from the 2008 Summer Olympics in Beijing

Personal information
- Nickname: Lupo
- Born: 28 November 1981 (age 44) Oberndorf bei Salzburg, Austria
- Occupation: Judoka
- Height: 1.7 m (5 ft 7 in)

Sport
- Country: Austria
- Sport: Judo
- Weight class: –60 kg
- Rank: 5th dan black belt
- League: Erste Judo Bundesliga
- Retired: November 2016

Achievements and titles
- Olympic Games: (silver) (2008)
- World Champ.: (silver) (2005)
- European Champ.: (gold) (2004, 2008)
Medal record
Men's judo
Representing Austria
Olympic Games
Silver medal – second place	2008 Beijing	‍–‍60 kg
World Championships
Silver medal – second place	2005 Cairo	‍–‍60 kg
Bronze medal – third place	2007 Rio de Janeiro	‍–‍60 kg
European Championships
Gold medal – first place	2004 Bucharest	‍–‍60 kg
Gold medal – first place	2008 Lisbon	‍–‍60 kg
Silver medal – second place	2005 Rotterdam	‍–‍60 kg
Silver medal – second place	2010 Vienna	‍–‍60 kg
Bronze medal – third place	2003 Düsseldorf	‍–‍60 kg
Bronze medal – third place	2006 Tampere	‍–‍60 kg
Bronze medal – third place	2009 Tbilisi	‍–‍60 kg
IJF Grand Slam
Gold medal – first place	2009 Rio de Janeiro	‍–‍60 kg
Bronze medal – third place	2009 Paris	‍–‍60 kg
IJF Grand Prix
Gold medal – first place	2014 Zagreb	‍–‍60 kg
Silver medal – second place	2009 Abu Dhabi	‍–‍60 kg
Silver medal – second place	2010 Rotterdam	‍–‍60 kg
Bronze medal – third place	2009 Tunis	‍–‍60 kg
Bronze medal – third place	2014 Qingdao	‍–‍60 kg
World Juniors Championships
Silver medal – second place	2000 Nabeul	‍–‍60 kg
European Junior Championships
Silver medal – second place	2000 Nicosia	‍–‍60 kg

Profile at external databases
- IJF: 218
- JudoInside.com: 519
- Updated on 28 May 2023

Ludwig Paischer (born 28 November 1981 in Oberndorf bei Salzburg) is a retired Austrian judoka.

== Career ==
On November 16, 2016, Paischer announced his retirement.

Currently he lives in Japan.

== Achievements ==
Year	Tournament	Place	Weight class
2009	European Championships	3rd	Extra lightweight (60 kg)
2008	2008 Summer Olympics	2nd	Extra lightweight (60 kg)
2008	European Championships	1st	Extra lightweight (60 kg)
2007	World Judo Championships	3rd	Extra lightweight (60 kg)
2006	European Judo Championships	3rd	Extra lightweight (60 kg)
2005	World Judo Championships	2nd	Extra lightweight (60 kg)
2005	European Judo Championships	2nd	Extra lightweight (60 kg)
2004	European Judo Championships	1st	Extra lightweight (60 kg)
2003	European Judo Championships	3rd	Extra lightweight (60 kg)
2002	European Judo Championships	7th	Extra lightweight (60 kg)
