= 2000 European Junior Judo Championships =

Judo competition

Judo 2000 European Junior Judo Championships
- Location: Nicosia, Cyprus
- Dates: 8–10 December 2000

Competition at external databases
- Links: JudoInside

The 2000 European Junior Judo Championships is an edition of the European Junior Judo Championships, organised by the International Judo Federation. It was held in Nicosia, Cyprus from 8 to 10 December 2000.

== Medal summary ==
=== Medal table ===
* Host nation (Cyprus)

Rank	Nation	Gold	Silver	Bronze	Total
1	Poland (POL)	2	4	2	8
2	Great Britain (GBR)	2	1	1	4
3	France (FRA)	2	0	3	5
3	Germany (GER)	2	0	3	5
5	Netherlands (NED)	1	2	2	5
6	Austria (AUT)	1	2	0	3
7	Hungary (HUN)	1	1	2	4
8	Spain (ESP)	1	0	1	2
9	Azerbaijan (AZE)	1	0	0	1
9	Belgium (BEL)	1	0	0	1
11	Italy (ITA)	0	1	2	3
12	Belarus (BLR)	0	1	1	2
12	Slovenia (SLO)	0	1	1	2
14	Portugal (POR)	0	1	0	1
15	Russia (RUS)	0	0	4	4
16	Israel (ISR)	0	0	2	2
16	Ukraine (UKR)	0	0	2	2
18	Bosnia and Herzegovina (BIH)	0	0	1	1
18	Slovakia (SVK)	0	0	1	1
Totals (19 entries)		14	14	28	56

=== Men's events ===
Event	Gold	Silver	Bronze
Extra-lightweight (−60 kg)	Elchin Ismayilov (AZE)	Ludwig Paischer (AUT)	Gal Yekutiel (ISR)
Extra-lightweight (−60 kg)	Elchin Ismayilov (AZE)	Ludwig Paischer (AUT)	Laurent Bernard (FRA)
Half-lightweight (−66 kg)	Daniel Lachmann (GER)	João Pina (POR)	Bryan van Dijk (NED)
Half-lightweight (−66 kg)	Daniel Lachmann (GER)	João Pina (POR)	Christophe Besnard (FRA)
Lightweight (−73 kg)	Guillaume Elmont (NED)	Matthew Purssey (GBR)	Shamsudin Aliev (RUS)
Lightweight (−73 kg)	Guillaume Elmont (NED)	Matthew Purssey (GBR)	Daniele Pistillo (ITA)
Half-middleweight (−81 kg)	Thomas Cousins (GBR)	Antoni Chmielewski (POL)	Siarhei Shundzikau (BLR)
Half-middleweight (−81 kg)	Thomas Cousins (GBR)	Antoni Chmielewski (POL)	Ruslan Gadzhiev (RUS)
Middleweight (−90 kg)	Peter Cousins (GBR)	Thierry Mastenbroek (NED)	Amel Mekić (BIH)
Middleweight (−90 kg)	Peter Cousins (GBR)	Thierry Mastenbroek (NED)	Dániel Hadfi (HUN)
Half-heavyweight (−100 kg)	Jean Vanbever (FRA)	Mike Nieuwenhuijs (NED)	Zoltán Pálkovács (SVK)
Half-heavyweight (−100 kg)	Jean Vanbever (FRA)	Mike Nieuwenhuijs (NED)	Vitaliy Polyanskyy (UKR)
Heavyweight (+100 kg)	Grzegorz Eitel (POL)	Paolo Bianchessi (ITA)	Andrey Guriev (RUS)
Heavyweight (+100 kg)	Grzegorz Eitel (POL)	Paolo Bianchessi (ITA)	László Szilágyi (HUN)

=== Women's events ===
Event	Gold	Silver	Bronze
Extra-lightweight (−48 kg)	Caroline Lantoine (FRA)	Zsuzsa Fekete (HUN)	Monika Cabaj (POL)
Extra-lightweight (−48 kg)	Caroline Lantoine (FRA)	Zsuzsa Fekete (HUN)	Natascha van Gurp (NED)
Half-lightweight (−52 kg)	Viktória Nagy (HUN)	Barbara Bukowska (POL)	Petra Nareks (SLO)
Half-lightweight (−52 kg)	Viktória Nagy (HUN)	Barbara Bukowska (POL)	Teresa Blanco (ESP)
Lightweight (−57 kg)	Hilde Drexler (AUT)	Oriana Malachowska (POL)	Sophie Cox (GBR)
Lightweight (−57 kg)	Hilde Drexler (AUT)	Oriana Malachowska (POL)	Taly Rondel (ISR)
Half-middleweight (−63 kg)	Paulina Rainczuk (POL)	Claudia Heill (AUT)	Anna von Harnier (GER)
Half-middleweight (−63 kg)	Paulina Rainczuk (POL)	Claudia Heill (AUT)	Laura Bucchi (ITA)
Middleweight (−70 kg)	Ulrike Koehler (GER)	Sviatlana Tsimashenka (BLR)	Agnieszka Chlipala (POL)
Middleweight (−70 kg)	Ulrike Koehler (GER)	Sviatlana Tsimashenka (BLR)	Maryna Pryshchepa (UKR)
Half-heavyweight (−78 kg)	Raquel Prieto (ESP)	Kristina Decman (SLO)	Gabi Teichmann (GER)
Half-heavyweight (−78 kg)	Raquel Prieto (ESP)	Kristina Decman (SLO)	Svetlana Fedoseenko (RUS)
Heavyweight (+78 kg)	Marie Elisabeth Veys (BEL)	Magdalena Kozioł (POL)	Gertrud Mueller (GER)
Heavyweight (+78 kg)	Marie Elisabeth Veys (BEL)	Magdalena Kozioł (POL)	Audrey Canale (FRA)

Source Results
