= 2006 European Judo Championships =

2006 Judo European Judo Championships
- Venue: Tampere Ice Stadium
- Location: Tampere, Finland
- Dates: 25–28 May 2006

Competition at external databases
- Links: JudoInside

The 2006 European Judo Championships were the 17th edition of the European Judo Championships, and were held in Tampere, Finland between 25 and 28 May 2006.

== Medal overview ==
=== Men ===
Event	Gold	Silver	Bronze
60 kg	(United Kingdom) Craig Fallon	(Armenia) Armen Nazaryan	(Netherlands) Ruben Houkes (Austria) Ludwig Paischer
66 kg	(Georgia (country)) Zaza Kedelashvili	(France) Benjamin Darbelet	(Austria) Andreas Mitterfellner (Estonia) Künter Rothberg
73 kg	(Azerbaijan) Elnur Mammadli	(France) Daniel Fernandes	(Netherlands) Bryan Dijk (Russia) Salamu Mezhidov
81 kg	(Belarus) Siarhei Shundzikau	(Italy) Giuseppe Maddaloni	(Switzerland) Sergei Aschwanden (Netherlands) Guillaume Elmont
90 kg	(Russia) Ivan Pershin	(Spain) David Alarza	(United Kingdom) Winston Gordon (Italy) Roberto Meloni
100 kg	(Russia) Ruslan Gasimov	(Hungary) Dániel Hadfi	(United Kingdom) Peter Cousins (Germany) Dimitri Peters
+100 kg	(Germany) Andreas Tölzer	(Poland) Janusz Wojnarowicz	(Georgia (country)) Zviadi Khanjaliashvili (Russia) Tamerlan Tmenov

=== Women ===
Event	Gold	Silver	Bronze
48 kg	(Romania) Alina Alexandra Dumitru	(Turkey) Neşe Şensoy Yıldız	(Germany) Michaela Baschin (France) Frédérique Jossinet
52 kg	(Portugal) Telma Monteiro	(Romania) Ioana Maria Aluaș	(Belgium) Ilse Heylen (Germany) Mareen Kräh
57 kg	(France) Barbara Harel	(Azerbaijan) Kifayat Gasimova	(Spain) Isabel Fernández (Austria) Sabrina Filzmoser
63 kg	(United Kingdom) Sarah Clark	(France) Lucie Décosse	(Italy) Ylenia Scapin (Netherlands) Elisabeth Willeboordse
70 kg	(France) Gévrise Émane	(Germany) Heide Wollert	(Belgium) Catherine Jacques (Ukraine) Maryna Pryshchepa
78 kg	(Russia) Vera Moskalyuk	(France) Céline Lebrun	(Spain) Esther San Miguel (Belarus) Sviatlana Tsimashenka
+78 kg	(France) Anne-Sophie Mondière	(Netherlands) Carola Uilenhoed	(Belarus) Yuliya Barysik (Slovenia) Lucija Polavder

=== Medals table ===
Rank	Nation	Gold	Silver	Bronze	Total
1	France	3	4	1	8
2	Russia	3	0	2	5
3	Great Britain	2	0	2	4
4	Germany	1	1	3	5
5	Azerbaijan	1	1	0	2
5	Romania	1	1	0	2
7	Belarus	1	0	2	3
8	Georgia	1	0	1	2
9	Portugal	1	0	0	1
10	Netherlands	0	1	4	5
11	Italy	0	1	2	3
11	Spain	0	1	2	3
13	Armenia	0	1	0	1
13	Hungary	0	1	0	1
13	Poland	0	1	0	1
13	Turkey	0	1	0	1
17	Austria	0	0	3	3
18	Belgium	0	0	2	2
19	Estonia	0	0	1	1
19	Slovenia	0	0	1	1
19	Switzerland	0	0	1	1
19	Ukraine	0	0	1	1

== Results overview ==
=== Men ===
==== 60 kg ====
Position	Judoka	Country
1.	Craig Fallon	Great Britain
2.	Armen Nazaryan	Armenia
3.	Ruben Houkes	Netherlands
3.	Ludwig Paischer	Austria
5.	Nestor Khergiani	Georgia
5.	Cemal Oğuz	Turkey
7.	Deniss Kozlovs	Latvia
7.	Kamil Sułek	Poland

==== 66 kg ====
Position	Judoka	Country
1.	Zaza Kedelashvili	Georgia
2.	Benjamin Darbelet	France
3.	Andreas Mitterfellner	Austria
3.	Künter Rothberg	Estonia
5.	Costel Danculea	Romania
5.	Pedro Dias	Portugal
7.	Gabriel Bengtsson	Sweden
7.	Marcel Trudov	Moldova

==== 73 kg ====
Position	Judoka	Country
1.	Elnur Mammadli	Azerbaijan
2.	Daniel Fernandes	France
3.	Bryan Dijk	Netherlands
3.	Salamu Mezhidov	Russia
5.	Matthew Purssey	Great Britain
5.	Kanstantsin Siamionau	Belarus
7.	Victor Bivol	Moldova
7.	Francesco Bruyere	Italy

==== 81 kg ====
Position	Judoka	Country
1.	Siarhei Shundzikau	Belarus
2.	Giuseppe Maddaloni	Italy
3.	Sergei Aschwanden	Switzerland
3.	Guillaume Elmont	Netherlands
5.	Ole Bischof	Germany
5.	Alain Schmitt	France
7.	Aleksei Budõlin	Estonia
7.	João Neto	Portugal

==== 90 kg ====
Position	Judoka	Country
1.	Ivan Pershin	Russia
2.	David Alarza	Spain
3.	Winston Gordon	Great Britain
3.	Roberto Meloni	Italy
5.	Mark Huizinga	Netherlands
5.	Krzysztof Węglarz	Poland
7.	Jevgeņijs Borodavko	Latvia
7.	Dmitri Budõlin	Estonia

==== 100 kg ====
Position	Judoka	Country
1.	Ruslan Gasymov	Russia
2.	Dániel Hadfi	Hungary
3.	Peter Cousins	Great Britain
3.	Dimitri Peters	Germany
5.	Ihar Makarau	Belarus
5.	Ariel Ze'evi	Israel
7.	Franz Birkfellner	Austria
7.	George Kizilashvili	Georgia

==== +100 kg ====
Position	Judoka	Country
1.	Andreas Tölzer	Germany
2.	Janusz Wojnarowicz	Poland
3.	Zviadi Khanjaliashvili	Georgia
3.	Tamerlan Tmenov	Russia
5.	Martin Padar	Estonia
5.	Yevgen Sotnikov	Ukraine
7.	Barna Bor	Hungary
7.	Pierre Robin	France

=== Women ===
==== 48 kg ====
Position	Judoka	Country
1.	Alina Alexandra Dumitru	Romania
2.	Neşe Şensoy Yıldız	Turkey
3.	Michaela Baschin	Germany
3.	Frédérique Jossinet	France
5.	Vanesa Arenas Comerón	Spain
5.	Natalia Samoilova	Russia
7.	Ana Hormigo	Portugal
7.	Olha Sukha	Ukraine

==== 52 kg ====
Position	Judoka	Country
1.	Telma Monteiro	Portugal
2.	Ioana Maria Aluaș	Romania
3.	Ilse Heylen	Belgium
3.	Mareen Kräh	Germany
5.	Petra Nareks	Slovenia
5.	Aynur Samat	Turkey
7.	Antonia Cuomo	Italy
7.	Maryna Jarskaya	Belarus

==== 57 kg ====
Position	Judoka	Country
1.	Barbara Harel	France
2.	Kifayat Gasimova	Azerbaijan
3.	Isabel Fernández	Spain
3.	Sabrina Filzmoser	Austria
5.	Bernadett Baczkó	Hungary
5.	Nina Koivumäki	Finland
7.	Yvonne Bönisch	Germany
7.	Dani Libosan	Netherlands

==== 63 kg ====
Position	Judoka	Country
1.	Sarah Clark	Great Britain
2.	Lucie Décosse	France
3.	Ylenia Scapin	Italy
3.	Elisabeth Willeboordse	Netherlands
5.	Sara Álvarez	Spain
5.	Urška Žolnir	Slovenia
7.	Vera Koval	Russia
7.	Brigitta Szabó	Hungary

==== 70 kg ====
Position	Judoka	Country
1.	Gévrise Émane	France
2.	Heide Wollert	Germany
3.	Catherine Jacques	Belgium
3.	Maryna Pryshchepa	Ukraine
5.	Cecilia Blanco	Spain
5.	Edith Bosch	Netherlands
7.	Erica Barbieri	Italy
7.	Raša Sraka	Slovenia

==== 78 kg ====
Position	Judoka	Country
1.	Vera Moskalyuk	Russia
2.	Céline Lebrun	France
3.	Esther San Miguel	Spain
3.	Sviatlana Tsimashenka	Belarus
5.	Lucia Morico	Italy
5.	Michelle Rogers	Great Britain
7.	Anastasiia Matrosova	Ukraine
7.	Claudia Zwiers	Netherlands

==== +78 kg ====
Position	Judoka	Country
1.	Anne-Sophie Mondière	France
2.	Carola Uilenhoed	Netherlands
3.	Yuliya Barysik	Belarus
3.	Lucija Polavder	Slovenia
5.	Tea Donguzashvili	Russia
5.	Maryna Prokofyeva	Ukraine
7.	Karina Bryant	Great Britain
7.	Małgorzata Górnicka	Poland
