= Cemal Oğuz =

Turkish judoka (born 1980)

Cemal Oğuz (born 1 December 1980) is a Turkish judoka.

== Achievements ==
Year	Tournament	Place	Weight class
2007	World Judo Championships	7th	Extra lightweight (60 kg)
2006	European Judo Championships	5th	Extra lightweight (60 kg)
