= Elnur Mammadli =

Azerbaijani Olympic judoka (born 1988)

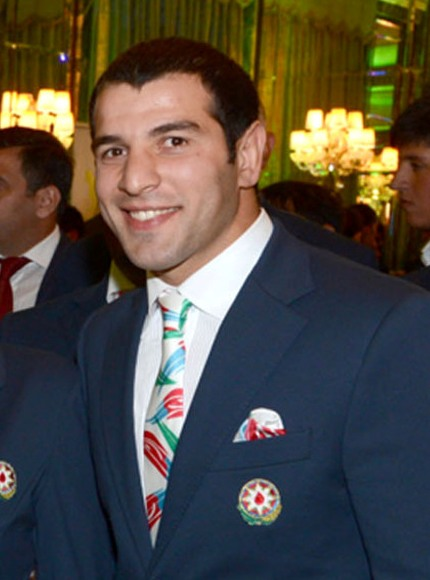

Personal information
- Born: 29 June 1988 (age 38)
- Occupation: Judoka

Sport
- Country: Azerbaijan
- Sport: Judo
- Weight class: ‍–‍73 kg, ‍–‍81 kg, ‍–‍90 kg

Achievements and titles
- Olympic Games: (gold) (2008)
- World Champ.: (silver) (2007)
- European Champ.: (gold) (2006, 2011)
Medal record
Men's judo
Representing Azerbaijan
Olympic Games
Gold medal – first place	2008 Beijing	‍–‍73 kg
World Championships
Silver medal – second place	2007 Rio de Janeiro	‍–‍73 kg
European Championships
Gold medal – first place	2006 Tampere	‍–‍73 kg
Gold medal – first place	2011 Istanbul	‍–‍81 kg
World Masters
Gold medal – first place	2011 Baku	‍–‍81 kg
Gold medal – first place	2012 Almaty	‍–‍81 kg
IJF Grand Slam
Bronze medal – third place	2011 Rio de Janeiro	‍–‍81 kg
IJF Grand Prix
Bronze medal – third place	2011 Düsseldorf	‍–‍81 kg
Bronze medal – third place	2011 Abu Dhabi	‍–‍90 kg
Bronze medal – third place	2012 Düsseldorf	‍–‍81 kg
European Cadet Championships
Gold medal – first place	2004 Rotterdam	‍–‍73 kg

Profile at external databases
- IJF: 2228
- JudoInside.com: 33796
- Updated on 30 May 2023

Elnur Mammadli (Azerbaijani: Elnur Məmmədli, born 29 June 1988, Baku, Azerbaijan) is an Azerbaijani judoka.

Mammadli won the gold medal during the 2008 Beijing Olympics in the ‍–‍73 kg division. In the final he beat the favorite Wang Ki-chun.

On 14 September 2024, he was elected chairman of the Public Council under the Ministry of Youth and Sports.

== Achievements ==
Year	Tournament	Place	Weight class
2012	World Masters	1st	Lightweight (-81 kg)
2011	European Judo Championships	1st	Lightweight (-81 kg)
2011	World Masters	1st	Lightweight (-81 kg)
2010	World Judo Championships	5th	Lightweight (-81 kg)
2008	Summer Olympics	1st	Lightweight (-73 kg)
2007	World Judo Championships	2nd	Lightweight (-73 kg)
2006	European Judo Championships	1st	Lightweight (-73 kg)

Olympic Games
Preceded by Farid Mansurov	Flagbearer for Azerbaijan; London 2012	Succeeded by Teymur Mammadov
