= Guillaume Elmont =

Dutch judoka (born 1981)

Personal information
- Full name: Guillaume Ricaldo Elmont
- Born: 10 August 1981 (age 44) Rotterdam
- Occupation: Judoka

Sport
- Country: Netherlands
- Sport: Judo
- Weight class: ‍–‍81 kg, ‍–‍90 kg

Achievements and titles
- Olympic Games: 5th (2008)
- World Champ.: (2005)
- European Champ.: (silver) (2008)
Medal record
Men's judo
Representing the Netherlands
World Championships
| Gold medal – first place | 2005 Cairo | ‍–‍81 kg |
| Bronze medal – third place | 2007 Rio de Janeiro | ‍–‍81 kg |
European Games
| Bronze medal – third place | 2015 Baku | ‍–‍90 kg |
European Championships
| Silver medal – second place | 2008 Lisbon | ‍–‍81 kg |
| Bronze medal – third place | 2006 Tampere | ‍–‍81 kg |
| Bronze medal – third place | 2007 Belgrade | ‍–‍81 kg |
| Bronze medal – third place | 2010 Vienna | ‍–‍81 kg |
IJF Grand Slam
| Gold medal – first place | 2014 Baku | ‍–‍90 kg |
| Silver medal – second place | 2010 Rio de Janeiro | ‍–‍81 kg |
| Silver medal – second place | 2011 Paris | ‍–‍81 kg |
IJF Grand Prix
| Gold medal – first place | 2010 Rotterdam | ‍–‍81 kg |
| Silver medal – second place | 2009 Abu Dhabi | ‍–‍81 kg |
| Silver medal – second place | 2011 Abu Dhabi | ‍–‍81 kg |
| Silver medal – second place | 2013 Samsun | ‍–‍90 kg |
| Bronze medal – third place | 2010 Tunis | ‍–‍81 kg |
| Bronze medal – third place | 2015 Zagreb | ‍–‍90 kg |
European Junior Championships
| Gold medal – first place | 2000 Nicosia | ‍–‍73 kg |

Profile at external databases
- IJF: 279
- JudoInside.com: 28
- Updated on 17 November 2022

Guillaume Ricaldo Elmont (born 10 August 1981 in Rotterdam) is a male retired judoka from the Netherlands, whose biggest success was winning the world title at the 2005 World Judo Championships in Cairo, Egypt. He did so in the ‍–‍81 kg weight division. In 2005 he became Amsterdam Sportsman of the year.

Elmont represented the Netherlands three times at the Olympics, in 2004, 2008 and 2012. He is a son of Surinamese judoka Ricardo Elmont and brother of Dex Elmont.

Since the Summer of 2015 Elmont has been the performance coach for Dutch association football club Ajax Amsterdam. Starting May 2025, Elmont is the director of Elite Sports at the Dutch judo association JBN (Judo Bond Nederland), where he is responsible for the jiujitsu and judo strategies.

== Achievements ==
| Year | Tournament | Place | Weight class |
|---|---|---|---|
| 2008 | European Championships | 2nd | Half middleweight (81 kg) |
| 2007 | World Judo Championships | 3rd | Half middleweight (81 kg) |
| 2007 | European Judo Championships | 3rd | Half middleweight (81 kg) |
| 2006 | European Judo Championships | 3rd | Half middleweight (81 kg) |
| 2005 | World Judo Championships | 1st | Half middleweight (81 kg) |
| 2005 | European Judo Championships | 5th | Half middleweight (81 kg) |
| 2002 | European Judo Championships | 7th | Half middleweight (81 kg) |

Awards
| Preceded by Michiel Bartman; Diederik Simon | Amsterdam Sportsman of the Year; 2005 | Succeeded by Gregory Sedoc |
