= Nina Koivumäki =

Finnish Olympic judoka (born 1985)

Personal information
- Born: 23 July 1985 (age 40) Pori, Finland
- Occupation: Judoka
- Height: 1.69 m (5 ft 6 1/2 in)
- Weight: 59 kg (130 lb)

Sport
- Country: Finland
- Sport: Judo
- Weight class: –57 kg
- Club: Tampereen Judo
- Coached by: Tapio Mantymaki

Achievements and titles
- Olympic Games: R16 (2008)
- World Champ.: 5th (2007)
- European Champ.: 5th (2006)
Medal record
European U23 Championships
Silver medal – second place	2006 Moscow	–57 kg
European Junior Championships
Silver medal – second place	2002 Rotterdam	–57 kg
Bronze medal – third place	2004 Sofia	–57 kg

Profile at external databases
- IJF: 6342
- JudoInside.com: 13691
- Updated on 9 February 2022

Nina Koivumäki (born July 23, 1985, in Pori) is a Finnish judoka, who competed as a lightweight. She is a five-time national champion, and a three-time medalist at the European Junior Championships. She is a member of Tampereen Judo Club in Tampere, and is coached and trained by Tapio Mantymaki.

Koivumaki qualified for the women's half-lightweight class (57 kg) at the 2008 Summer Olympics in Beijing, by placing fifth from the 2007 World Judo Championships in Rio de Janeiro, Brazil. She reached only into the second preliminary round, where she lost by two yukos to China's Xu Yan. Because her opponent advanced further into the semi-finals, Koivumaki offered another shot for the bronze medal by defeating Algeria's Lila Latrous, with a koka and a golden score, in the first repechage bout. She finished in ninth place, after losing out the second repechage bout to Japan's Aiko Sato, who successfully scored an ippon and a yoko shiho gatame (seven mat holds), in three minutes.
