= Sarah Clark (judoka) =

British judoka (born 1978)

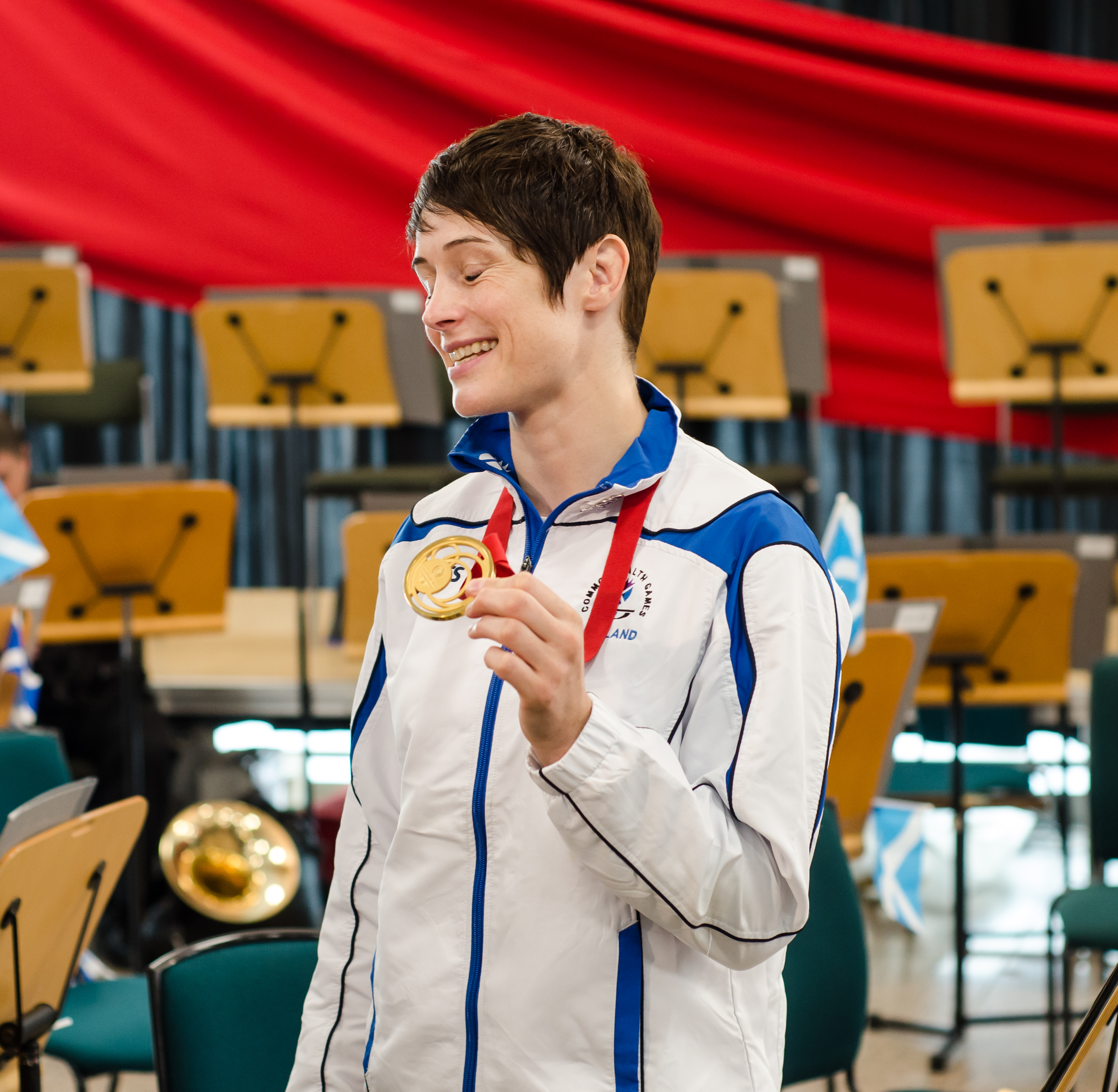
- Clark in 2014

Personal information
- Nationality: British (Scottish)
- Born: 3 January 1978 (age 48) Durham, England
- Occupation: Judoka

Sport
- Country: Great Britain
- Sport: Judo
- Weight class: ‍–‍57 kg, ‍–‍63 kg
- Rank: 6th dan black belt

Achievements and titles
- Olympic Games: 13th (2004)
- World Champ.: R32 (2005, 2007, 2009, 2010, 2011)
- European Champ.: (gold) (2006)
- Commonwealth Games: (gold) (2014)
Medal record
Women's judo
Representing Great Britain
European Championships
Gold medal – first place	2006 Tampere	‍–‍63 kg
Silver medal – second place	2009 Tbilisi	‍–‍57 kg
Bronze medal – third place	2004 Bucharest	‍–‍63 kg
Representing Scotland
Commonwealth Games
Gold medal – first place	2014 Glasgow	‍–‍63 kg
Silver medal – second place	2002 Manchester	‍–‍63 kg

Profile at external databases
- IJF: 106
- JudoInside.com: 8879
- Updated on 16 November 2022

Sarah Clark (born 3 January 1978) is a British judoka, who has competed at three Olympic Games.

== Judo career ==
Clark got her Shodan black belt at the young age of 15. Clark came to prominence when winning the Scottish Championships in 1997. In 2000 and 2001 she won back to back half-middleweight British titles at the British Judo Championships.

Clark represented the 2002 Scottish team at the 2002 Commonwealth Games in Manchester, England, where she competed in the 63 kg category and won a silver medal.

In 2004, she was selected to represent Great Britain at the 2004 Summer Olympics in Greece, she competed in the half-middleweight (-63 kg) category and reached the last 16, where she was beaten by the eventual silver medalist, Claudia Heill. She then lost to Ronda Rousey in the first round of the repechage. Also during 2004 she won a bronze medal at the 2004 European Judo Championships, in Bucharest.

Two more British titles were secured in 2005 and 2006 and she achieved her best result to date, which was a European gold medal at the 2006 European Judo Championships, in Tampere.

In 2008, she went to her second Olympic Games, at the 2008 Summer Olympics, she again lost to Heill, this time in the first round of the women's 63 kg. The following year in 2009, a silver medal at the 2009 European Judo Championships took her tally to a European medal of every colour. From 2008 to 2012 she secured three more British titles, bringing her total to seven.

She suffered a broken arm in 2009, which required surgery. During the recovery process she intensely trained the left-handed uchimata.

Clark ended her Olympic career on a high note by gaining selection for her home Olympic Games in London. Dropping down a weightclass, she competed in the women's 57 kg category, where she lost in the first round to Automne Pavia.

In 2014, she won the gold medal in the 63kg for Scotland at the 2014 Commonwealth Games in Glasgow.
