= Hélène Wezeu Dombeu =

Cameroonian judoka (born 1987)

Personal information
- Born: 8 October 1987 (age 38)
- Occupation: Judoka

Sport
- Country: Cameroon
- Sport: Judo
- Weight class: 63 kg
Medal record
Women's judo
Representing Cameroon
African Games
| Gold medal – first place | 2015 Brazzaville | −63 kg |
| Gold medal – first place | 2019 Rabat | −63 kg |
Commonwealth Games
| Silver medal – second place | 2014 Glasgow | 63 kg |

Profile at external databases
- JudoInside.com: 79909

Hélène Wezeu Dombeu (born 8 October 1987) is a Cameroonian judoka. She is a two-time gold medalist in the women's 63 kg at the African Games, both in 2015 and in 2019, and a silver medalist at the Commonwealth Games.

== Career ==
She won the gold medal in the women's 63 kg event at the 2019 African Games held in Rabat, Morocco.

She competed at the 2014 Commonwealth Games where she won a silver medal in the 63 kg event.

In 2020, she won one of the bronze medals in the women's 63 kg event at the African Judo Championships held in Antananarivo, Madagascar.

== Achievements ==
| Year | Tournament | Place | Weight class |
|---|---|---|---|
| 2014 | Commonwealth Games | 2nd | 63 kg |
| 2015 | African Games | 1st | −63 kg |
| 2019 | African Games | 1st | −63 kg |
