= Robert Gess =

German judoka

Robert Gess (born 14 August 1985) is a German judoka, who won the World Cup in Rome in 2012.

== Achievements ==
Year	Tournament	Place	Weight class
2007	World Judo Championships	7th	Lightweight (73 kg)

== See also ==
- European Judo Championships
- German Judo Federation
- History of martial arts
- Judo in Germany
- List of judo techniques
- List of judoka
- Martial arts timeline
