= Giulia Quintavalle =

Italian judoka (born 1983)

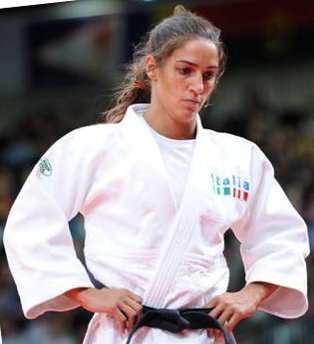

Personal information
- Born: 6 March 1983 (age 43) Livorno, Italy
- Occupation: Judoka

Sport
- Country: Italy
- Sport: Judo
- Weight class: –57 kg

Achievements and titles
- Olympic Games: (gold) (2008)
- World Champ.: 5th (2007)
- European Champ.: 5th (2010, 2011)
Medal record
Women's judo
Representing Italy
Olympic Games
Gold medal – first place	2008 Beijing	‍–‍57 kg
European Championships
Gold medal – first place	2010 Vienna	Women's team
IJF Grand Prix
Gold medal – first place	2011 Abu Dhabi	‍–‍57 kg
Silver medal – second place	2010 Abu Dhabi	‍–‍57 kg
Bronze medal – third place	2009 Abu Dhabi	‍–‍57 kg
Bronze medal – third place	2011 Düsseldorf	‍–‍57 kg
Bronze medal – third place	2014 Astana	‍–‍57 kg

Profile at external databases
- IJF: 691
- JudoInside.com: 13963
- Updated on 30 May 2023

Giulia Quintavalle (born 6 March 1983, in Livorno) is an Italian judoka. She won the gold medal in the ‍–‍57 kg weight class at the 2008 Summer Olympics.

== Achievements ==
Olympic Games

- Gold 2008 Beijing
- Gold Vienna 2010 (squadre)

Mediterranean Games

- Bronze Almeria 2005

National Judo Championship

- Gold 3 times national champion absolute (2004-2005-2006)

=== Other international events ===
- Bronze Lione 2002
- Silver Coimbra 2002
- Bronze Tunisi 2007
- Silver Mosca 2007
- Silver Lido di Roma 2008
- Bronze Abu Dhabi 2009
- Bronze Varsavia 2010
- Silver Abu Dhabi 2010
- Bronze GP Düsseldorf 2011
- Gold WCF Lisbona 2011
- Gold Roma World Cup 2011
- Gold Abu Dhabi 2011
