= 2002 European Junior Judo Championships =

Judo competition

Judo 2002 European Junior Judo Championships
- Location: Rotterdam, Netherlands
- Dates: 14–17 November 2002

Competition at external databases
- Links: JudoInside

The 2002 European Junior Judo Championships is an edition of the European Junior Judo Championships, organised by the International Judo Federation. It was held in Rotterdam, Netherlands, from 14 to 17 November 2002.

== Medal summary ==
=== Men's events ===
Event	Gold	Silver	Bronze
Extra-lightweight (−60 kg)	Aleksander Bludnin (RUS)	Revazi Zintiridis (GEO)	Alexandre Cardonnel (FRA)
Extra-lightweight (−60 kg)	Aleksander Bludnin (RUS)	Revazi Zintiridis (GEO)	Endika Cortijos (ESP)
Half-lightweight (−66 kg)	Ahmed Ould-Saïd (FRA)	Zaza Kedelashvili (GEO)	Dex Elmont (NED)
Half-lightweight (−66 kg)	Ahmed Ould-Saïd (FRA)	Zaza Kedelashvili (GEO)	Tomasz Krecielewski (POL)
Lightweight (−73 kg)	David Kevkhishvili (GEO)	Alain Schmitt (FRA)	Ilias Iliadis (GRE)
Lightweight (−73 kg)	David Kevkhishvili (GEO)	Alain Schmitt (FRA)	Srđan Mrvaljević (YUG)
Half-middleweight (−81 kg)	Roman Hontyuk (UKR)	Konstantīns Ovčiņņikovs (LAT)	Alexandru Caponi (ROU)
Half-middleweight (−81 kg)	Roman Hontyuk (UKR)	Konstantīns Ovčiņņikovs (LAT)	Andrei Kazusenok (BLR)
Middleweight (−90 kg)	Mindia Bodaveli (GEO)	Khamed Kubov (RUS)	Gergö Rajcsányi (HUN)
Middleweight (−90 kg)	Mindia Bodaveli (GEO)	Khamed Kubov (RUS)	Marius Bucsa (ROU)
Half-heavyweight (−100 kg)	Vitaliy Bubon (UKR)	Marjan Nicolae Nichitelea (ROU)	Mike Nieuwenhuijs (NED)
Half-heavyweight (−100 kg)	Vitaliy Bubon (UKR)	Marjan Nicolae Nichitelea (ROU)	Georgi Kizilashvili (GEO)
Heavyweight (+100 kg)	Zviadi Khanjaliashvili (GEO)	Ziad Ouaquef (FRA)	Konstantin Yurchenko (RUS)
Heavyweight (+100 kg)	Zviadi Khanjaliashvili (GEO)	Ziad Ouaquef (FRA)	Alexander Moonen (NED)

=== Women's events ===
Event	Gold	Silver	Bronze
Extra-lightweight (−48 kg)	Camilla Magnolfi (ITA)	Tatyana Bobalova (RUS)	Carmen Bogdan (ROU)
Extra-lightweight (−48 kg)	Camilla Magnolfi (ITA)	Tatyana Bobalova (RUS)	Clare Lynch (GBR)
Half-lightweight (−52 kg)	Sanna Askelöf (SWE)	Natascha van Gurp (NED)	Karina Dorokhina (RUS)
Half-lightweight (−52 kg)	Sanna Askelöf (SWE)	Natascha van Gurp (NED)	Michal Feinblat (ISR)
Lightweight (−57 kg)	Brigitta Szabó (HUN)	Nina Koivumäki (FIN)	Kifayat Gasimova (AZE)
Lightweight (−57 kg)	Brigitta Szabó (HUN)	Nina Koivumäki (FIN)	Laura Gómez (ESP)
Half-middleweight (−63 kg)	Maria Schedrukhina (RUS)	Magali Leguay (FRA)	Claudia Malzahn (GER)
Half-middleweight (−63 kg)	Maria Schedrukhina (RUS)	Magali Leguay (FRA)	Johanna Ylinen (FIN)
Middleweight (−70 kg)	Sviatlana Tsimashenka (BLR)	Noa Laor (ISR)	Maryna Pryshchepa (UKR)
Middleweight (−70 kg)	Sviatlana Tsimashenka (BLR)	Noa Laor (ISR)	Pien Selbeck (NED)
Half-heavyweight (−78 kg)	Alina Croitoru (ROU)	Mariya Yancheva (BUL)	Seda Unal-Karadag (TUR)
Half-heavyweight (−78 kg)	Alina Croitoru (ROU)	Mariya Yancheva (BUL)	Lucie Louette (FRA)
Heavyweight (+78 kg)	Katrin Dittrich (GER)	Elena Ivashchenko (RUS)	Carola Uilenhoed (NED)
Heavyweight (+78 kg)	Katrin Dittrich (GER)	Elena Ivashchenko (RUS)	Yuliya Barysik (BLR)

Source Results

=== Medal table ===
* Host nation (Netherlands)

Rank	Nation	Gold	Silver	Bronze	Total
1	Georgia (GEO)	3	2	1	6
2	Russia (RUS)	2	3	2	7
3	Ukraine (UKR)	2	0	1	3
4	France (FRA)	1	3	2	6
5	Romania (ROU)	1	1	3	5
6	Belarus (BLR)	1	0	2	3
7	Germany (GER)	1	0	1	2
7	Hungary (HUN)	1	0	1	2
9	Italy (ITA)	1	0	0	1
9	Sweden (SWE)	1	0	0	1
11	Netherlands (NED)*	0	1	5	6
12	Finland (FIN)	0	1	1	2
12	Israel (ISR)	0	1	1	2
14	Bulgaria (BUL)	0	1	0	1
14	Latvia (LAT)	0	1	0	1
16	Spain (ESP)	0	0	2	2
17	Azerbaijan (AZE)	0	0	1	1
17	Great Britain (GBR)	0	0	1	1
17	Greece (GRE)	0	0	1	1
17	Poland (POL)	0	0	1	1
17	Turkey (TUR)	0	0	1	1
17	Yugoslavia (YUG)	0	0	1	1
Totals (22 entries)		14	14	28	56
