= Franz Birkfellner =

Austrian judoka

Personal information
- Born: 20 November 1976 (age 49)
- Occupation: Judoka

Sport
- Sport: Judo
Medal record
Men's judo
Representing Austria
European Championships
Bronze medal – third place	2000 Wroclaw	100 kg

Profile at external databases
- JudoInside.com: 490

Franz Birkfellner (born 20 November 1976) is an Austrian judoka.

== Achievements ==
Year	Tournament	Place	Weight class
2007	World Judo Championships	7th	Open class
2006	European Judo Championships	7th	Half heavyweight (100 kg)
2004	European Judo Championships	7th	Half heavyweight (100 kg)
2003	European Judo Championships	7th	Half heavyweight (100 kg)
2001	European Judo Championships	5th	Open class
2000	European Judo Championships	3rd	Half heavyweight (100 kg)
