= Siarhei Shundzikau =

Belarusian judoka (born 1981)

Personal information
- Born: 10 July 1981 (age 44)
- Occupation: Judoka

Sport
- Country: Belarus
- Sport: Judo
- Weight class: ‍–‍81 kg

Achievements and titles
- Olympic Games: R16 (2004)
- World Champ.: (silver) (2009)
- European Champ.: (gold) (2006)
Medal record
Men's judo
Representing Belarus
World Championships
Silver medal – second place	2009 Rotterdam	‍–‍81 kg
European Championships
Gold medal – first place	2006 Tampere	‍–‍81 kg
Silver medal – second place	2007 Belgrade	‍–‍81 kg
IJF Grand Slam
Gold medal – first place	2009 Moscow	‍–‍81 kg
European Junior Championships
Bronze medal – third place	2000 Nicosia	‍–‍81 kg

Profile at external databases
- IJF: 863
- JudoInside.com: 11203
- Updated on 13 August 2023

Siarhei Shundzikau (born 10 July 1981) is a Belarusian judoka.

== Achievements ==
Year	Tournament	Place	Weight class
2003	European Judo Championships	5th	Half middleweight (81 kg)
2006	European Judo Championships	1st	Half middleweight (81 kg)
2007	European Judo Championships	2nd	Half middleweight (81 kg)
2009	World Judo Championships	2nd	Half middleweight (81 kg)
