= Bryan van Dijk =

Dutch judoka

Personal information
- Born: 8 February 1981 (age 45)
- Occupation: Judoka

Sport
- Country: Netherlands
- Sport: Judo
- Weight class: –66 kg, –73 kg

Achievements and titles
- World Champ.: 7th (2001)
- European Champ.: (bronze) (2006)
Medal record
Men's judo
Representing Netherlands
European Championships
Bronze medal – third place	2006 Tampere	–73 kg
IJF Grand Prix
Gold medal – first place	2009 Tunis	–73 kg
European Junior Championships
Bronze medal – third place	2000 Nicosia	–66 kg

Profile at external databases
- IJF: 3448
- JudoInside.com: 22
- Updated on 17 February 2022

Bryan van Dijk (born 8 February 1981, Amersfoort) is a Dutch judoka.

== Achievements ==
Year	Tournament	Place	Weight class
2006	European Judo Championships	3rd	Lightweight (73 kg)
2001	World Judo Championships	7th	Half lightweight (66 kg)
