= Judo at the 2014 Commonwealth Games – Women's 63 kg =

Judo Judo – Women's 63 kg at the 2014 Commonwealth Games
- Venue: Scottish Exhibition and Conference Centre
- Date: 25 July 2014
- Competitors: 11 from 9 nations

Medalists
| gold medal | Sarah Clark | Scotland |
| silver medal | Helene Wezeu Dombeu | Cameroon |
| bronze medal | Faith Pitman | England |
| bronze medal | Katie Jemima Yeats-Brown | England |

The women's 63 kg Judo competitions at the 2014 Commonwealth Games in Glasgow, Scotland was held on 25 July at the Scottish Exhibition and Conference Centre. Judo returned to the program, after last being competed back in 2002.

== Results ==
=== Repechages ===
| Repechage | | Bronze medal |
| Katie Jemima Yeats-Brown (ENG) | 1000 |
| Garima Choudary (IND) | 0002 | Katie Jemima Yeats-Brown (ENG) | 1000 |
| | | B Valois Fortier (CAN) | 0001 |

| Repechage | | Bronze medal |
| Faith Pitman (ENG) | 1000 |
| Marcon Bezzina (MLT) | 0000 | Faith Pitman (ENG) | 0100 |
| | | K Haecker (AUS) | 0001 |

=== Preliminaries ===
Round of 16
KJ Yeats-Brown (ENG) | 0102
S Szögedi (GHA) | 0001
B Fopa (CMR) | 0002
G Choudhary (IND) | 0001
B Valois Fortier (CAN) | 1000
K Kee (NIR) | 0000

Quarterfinals
K Haecker (AUS) | 1011
KJ Yeats-Brown (ENG) | 0000
S Clark (SCO) | 1000
G Choudhary (IND) | 0002
F Pitman (ENG) | 0001
B Valois Fortier (CAN) | 0013
H Wezeu Dombeu (CMR) | 0000
M Bezzina (MLT) | 0003

Semifinals
K Haecker (AUS) | 0000
S Clark (SCO) | 1000
B Valois Fortier (CAN) | 0000
H Wezeu Dombeu (CMR) | 0103

Gold medal match
S Clark (SCO) | 1000
H Wezeu Dombeu (CMR) | 0000
