= Georgi Kizilashvili =

Georgian judoka (born 1983)

Personal information
- Born: 14 March 1983 (age 43)
- Occupation: Judoka

Sport
- Country: Georgia
- Sport: Judo
- Weight class: –100 kg, +100 kg

Achievements and titles
- World Champ.: 5th (2005)
- European Champ.: (silver) (2004)
Medal record
Men's judo
Representing Georgia
European Championships
| Silver medal – second place | 2004 Budapest | Open |
European Junior Championships
| Bronze medal – third place | 2002 Rotterdam | –100 kg |

Profile at external databases
- IJF: 20528
- JudoInside.com: 14169
- Updated on 14 February 2022

Georgi Kizilashvili (Georgian: გიორგი ყიზილაშვილი; born 14 March 1983) is a Georgian judoka.

== Achievements ==
| Year | Tournament | Place | Weight class |
|---|---|---|---|
| 2007 | European Open Championships | 7th | Open class |
| 2006 | European Championships | 7th | Half heavyweight (100 kg) |
| 2005 | World Championships | 5th | Open class |
| 2004 | European Open Championships | 2nd | Open class |
