= Gévrise Émane =

French Olympic judoka

Gévrise Emane
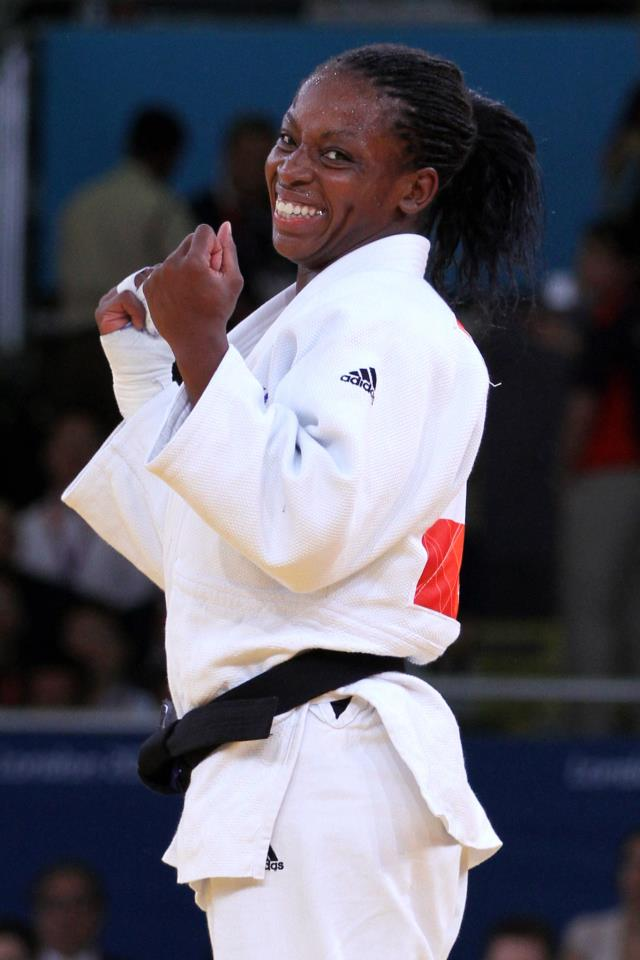
- Emane in 2012

Personal information
- Nationality: French
- Born: 27 July 1982 (age 44) Yaounde, Cameroon
- Occupation: Judoka

Sport
- Country: France
- Sport: Judo
- Weight class: –63 kg, –70 kg
- Rank: 6th dan black belt
- Club: Levallois Sporting Club Judo

Achievements and titles
- Olympic Games: (bronze) (2012)
- World Champ.: (gold) (2007, 2011, 2015)
- European Champ.: (gold) (2006, 2007, 2011, 2012, 2016)
Medal record
Women's judo
Representing France
Olympic Games
Bronze medal – third place	2012 London	‍–‍63 kg
World Championships
Gold medal – first place	2007 Rio de Janeiro	‍–‍70 kg
Gold medal – first place	2011 Paris	‍–‍63 kg
Gold medal – first place	2015 Astana	‍–‍70 kg
Silver medal – second place	2005 Cairo	‍–‍70 kg
Bronze medal – third place	2013 Rio de Janeiro	‍–‍63 kg
European Championships
Gold medal – first place	2006 Tampere	‍–‍70 kg
Gold medal – first place	2007 Belgrade	‍–‍70 kg
Gold medal – first place	2011 Istanbul	‍–‍63 kg
Gold medal – first place	2012 Chelyabinsk	‍–‍63 kg
Gold medal – first place	2016 Kazan	‍–‍70 kg
Bronze medal – third place	2008 Lisbon	‍–‍70 kg
World Masters
Gold medal – first place	2011 Baku	‍–‍63 kg
IJF Grand Slam
Gold medal – first place	2010 Paris	‍–‍63 kg
Gold medal – first place	2010 Moscow	‍–‍63 kg
Gold medal – first place	2011 Paris	‍–‍63 kg
Gold medal – first place	2014 Tokyo	‍–‍70 kg
Silver medal – second place	2010 Tokyo	‍–‍63 kg
Silver medal – second place	2011 Rio de Janeiro	‍–‍63 kg
Bronze medal – third place	2009 Rio de Janeiro	‍–‍63 kg
Bronze medal – third place	2016 Paris	‍–‍70 kg
IJF Grand Prix
Gold medal – first place	2009 Abu Dhabi	‍–‍63 kg
Gold medal – first place	2013 Samsun	‍–‍63 kg
Gold medal – first place	2014 Jeju	‍–‍70 kg
Silver medal – second place	2009 Qingdao	‍–‍63 kg
Silver medal – second place	2015 Tbilisi	‍–‍70 kg
Bronze medal – third place	2009 Tunis	‍–‍70 kg
Bronze medal – third place	2013 Miami	‍–‍63 kg
European U23 Championships
Silver medal – second place	2004 Ljubljana	‍–‍70 kg
Summer Universiade
Gold medal – first place	2003 Jeju	‍–‍70 kg

Profile at external databases
- IJF: 417
- JudoInside.com: 12721
- Updated on 28 May 2023

Gévrise Émane (born 27 July 1982) is a French judoka. She was the European champion in the women's 63 kg weight class.

Emane first gained attention at the 2005 World Judo Championships in Cairo, Egypt where she won the silver medal in the women's 70 kg class. Next year, Emane won her first European title at the 2006 European Judo Championships in Tampere after an ippon in the final, against the German Heide Wollert.

Emane became the world champion for the first time at the 2007 World Judo Championships in Rio de Janeiro by defeating Ronda Rousey of United States by points in the final match. After moving down in weight to the 63 kg class in 2009, Emane claimed her second World Championship title at the 2011 World Judo Championships in Paris, where she beat two-time world champion Yoshie Ueno of Japan by unanimous decision in the final.

At the 2012 Summer Olympics, she won the bronze medal.
