= Ylenia Scapin =

Italian judoka (born 1975)

Personal information
- Born: 8 January 1975 (age 51)
- Occupation: Judoka

Sport
- Country: Italy
- Sport: Judo
- Weight class: ‍–‍63 kg, ‍–‍70 kg, ‍–‍72 kg

Achievements and titles
- Olympic Games: (bronze) (1996, 2000)
- World Champ.: (bronze) (1999, 2003, 2007)
- European Champ.: (gold) (2008)
Medal record
Women's judo
Representing Italy
Olympic Games
Bronze medal – third place	1996 Atlanta	‍–‍72 kg
Bronze medal – third place	2000 Sydney	‍–‍70 kg
World Championships
Bronze medal – third place	1999 Birmingham	‍–‍70 kg
Bronze medal – third place	2003 Osaka	‍–‍63 kg
Bronze medal – third place	2007 Rio de Janeiro	‍–‍70 kg
European Championships
Gold medal – first place	2008 Lisbon	‍–‍70 kg
Silver medal – second place	1999 Bratislava	‍–‍70 kg
Silver medal – second place	2005 Rotterdam	‍–‍70 kg
Bronze medal – third place	1998 Oviedo	‍–‍70 kg
Bronze medal – third place	2000 Wrocław	‍–‍70 kg
Bronze medal – third place	2001 Paris	‍–‍63 kg
Bronze medal – third place	2003 Düsseldorf	‍–‍63 kg
Bronze medal – third place	2006 Tampere	‍–‍63 kg
World Juniors Championships
Bronze medal – third place	1992 Buenos Aires	‍–‍72 kg
European Junior Championships
Silver medal – second place	1993 Arnhem	‍–‍72 kg
Summer Universiade
Bronze medal – third place	1995 Fukuoka	‍–‍72 kg
Mediterranean Games
Gold medal – first place	2001 Tunis	‍–‍63 kg
Gold medal – first place	2005 Almería	‍–‍70 kg
Silver medal – second place	1997 Bari	‍–‍72 kg

Profile at external databases
- IJF: 34409
- JudoInside.com: 463
- Updated on 2 June 2023

Ylenia Scapin (born 8 January 1975 in Bolzano) is an Italian judoka.

Scapin won two Olympic medals in different weight classes, in 1996 and 2000.
