= Kifayat Gasimova =

Azerbaijani judoka (born 1986)

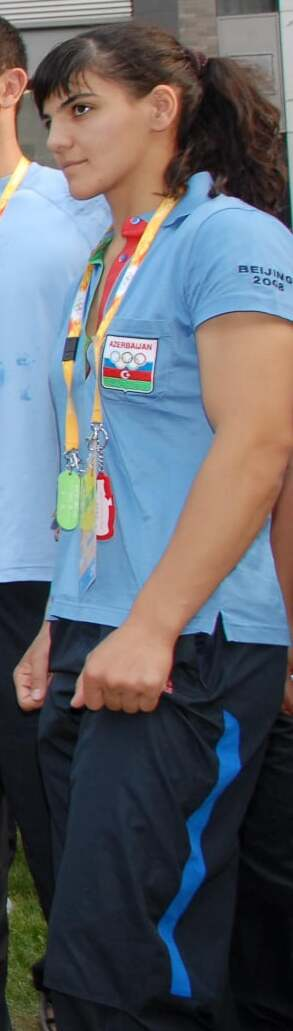
- At the 2008 Summer Olympics

Personal information
- Born: 1 February 1983 (age 43)
- Occupation: Judoka

Sport
- Country: Azerbaijan
- Sport: Judo
- Weight class: ‍–‍57 kg
- Club: Galatasaray Judo

Achievements and titles
- Olympic Games: R16 (2008, 2012)
- World Champ.: (bronze) (2009)
- European Champ.: (silver) (2006)
Medal record
Women's judo
Representing Azerbaijan
World Championships
Bronze medal – third place	2009 Rotterdam	‍–‍57 kg
European Championships
Silver medal – second place	2006 Tampere	‍–‍57 kg
Bronze medal – third place	2007 Belgrade	‍–‍57 kg
Bronze medal – third place	2008 Lisbon	‍–‍57 kg
IJF Grand Slam
Bronze medal – third place	2010 Tokyo	‍–‍57 kg
Bronze medal – third place	2013 Baku	‍–‍57 kg
Bronze medal – third place	2014 Baku	‍–‍57 kg
IJF Grand Prix
Gold medal – first place	2011 Baku	‍–‍57 kg
Gold medal – first place	2012 Baku	‍–‍57 kg
Bronze medal – third place	2014 Tbilisi	‍–‍57 kg
European U23 Championships
Gold medal – first place	2004 Ljubljana	‍–‍57 kg
Bronze medal – third place	2005 Kyiv	‍–‍57 kg
World Juniors Championships
Bronze medal – third place	2000 Nabeul	‍–‍57 kg
European Junior Championships
Gold medal – first place	1999 Rome	‍–‍52 kg
Silver medal – second place	1998 Bucharest	‍–‍52 kg
Bronze medal – third place	2002 Rotterdam	‍–‍57 kg
Islamic Solidarity Games
Silver medal – second place	2017 Baku	‍–‍57 kg
Silver medal – second place	2017 Baku	Women's team

Profile at external databases
- IJF: 25
- JudoInside.com: 6694
- Updated on 3 September 2023

Kifayat Gasimova (born 1 February 1986, in Kalbajar, Azerbaijan) is a retired Azerbaijani judoka and coach. She competed in the women's ‍–‍57 kg category (lightweight). She won a silver medal at the 2006 European Championships and bronze medals at the 2009 World and 2007 and 2008 European Championships, and. At the 2012 Summer Olympics, she lost to eventual champion, Kaori Matsumoto.
