= Zviadi Khanjaliashvili =

Georgian judoka (born 1983)

Personal information
- Born: 5 January 1983 (age 43)
- Occupation: Judoka

Sport
- Country: Georgia
- Sport: Judo
- Weight class: +100 kg

Achievements and titles
- World Champ.: 9th (2003)
- European Champ.: (bronze) (2006)
Medal record
Men's judo
Representing Georgia
European Championships
Bronze medal – third place	2006 Tampere	+100 kg
IJF Grand Prix
Bronze medal – third place	2009 Tunis	+100 kg
Bronze medal – third place	2010 Düsseldorf	+100 kg
Bronze medal – third place	2011 Abu Dhabi	+100 kg
European Junior Championships
Gold medal – first place	2002 Rotterdam	+100 kg

Profile at external databases
- IJF: 769
- JudoInside.com: 10225
- Updated on 17 November 2022

Zviadi Khanjaliashvili (Georgian: ზვიად ხანჯალიაშვილი; born 5 January 1983) is a Georgian judoka.

== Achievements ==
Year	Tournament	Place	Weight class
2006	European Judo Championships	3rd	Heavyweight (+100 kg)
