= 2007 World Judo Championships =

Judo competition

Judo 2007 World Judo Championships
- The official logotype: Sugarloaf Mountain and Urca Hill styled as a black belt.
- Venue: Farmasi Arena
- Location: Rio de Janeiro, Brazil
- Dates: 13–16 September 2007
- Competitors: 743 from 138 nations

Competition at external databases
- Links: IJF • JudoInside

The 2007 World Judo Championships are the 25th edition of the Judo World Championships, and were held at the Rio Olympic Arena, usually called Arena Multiuso, that was built for the 2007 Pan-American Games, in Jacarepaguá, Rio de Janeiro, Brazil from September 13 to September 16, 2007.

The competition gathered the sport's top athletes in Rio de Janeiro, with only a few exceptions, due to injuries. Among the high-profile injured judokas that were unable to participate were Brazil's Flávio Canto, bronze medallist in the -81 kg category at the 2004 Summer Olympic Games, who tore a ligament in his right elbow during the 2007 Pan American Games (during the event, Canto participated as a commentator for the Brazilian paid sports channel, SporTV); and Japan's Tadahiro Nomura, the three-time Olympic champion and heavy favorite in the -60 kg category was forced to withdraw only a few weeks before the event due to injury (his replacement was able to place 7th in the competition).

In the leadup to the event, Rio de Janeiro also hosted the IJF's International Congress, congregating the heads of all the national confederations affiliated to the IJF. The meeting took place on September 12, eve of the first day of competition, and in it, some important decisions were made. The first was the election of the new IJF president. Marius Vizer was elected by the attending representatives to replace Yung Sang Park, the current president. In addition, the Congress voted and approved unanimously, the extension of the IJF's president term from 2 years to 6 years. Another decision made in the meeting was the selection of the city that would host the 2011 World Championship. The contenders were the cities of Paris, France and Hamburg, Germany, and the French capital was selected as the host city for the 2011 event. Finally, the Congress also voted on the new presidency of the European Judo Union, with Russia's Sergei Soloveychik being elected president and Jean-Luc Rougé and Vladimír Bárta being elected as first vice president and vice president respectively. Newly appointed IJF president, Marius Vizer, was made honorary president of the European Judo Federation as well.

After the conclusion of competition in the last day of the event, the IJF members voted on the best athletes of the World Championship. In the men's side, Brazil's Tiago Camilo, who won in the -81 kg category by defeating all opponents by ippon (the perfect score, which ends the match automatically), was selected; and in the women's side, North Korea's Kye Sun-hui, who won in the -57 kg category, was chosen as best female athlete in the competition. Both athletes were presented with an obelisk-shaped, acrylic trophy for the achievement.

== Medal overview ==
=== Men ===
Event	Gold	Silver	Bronze
Extra-lightweight (60 kg)	Ruben Houkes (NED)	Nestor Khergiani (GEO)	Ludwig Paischer (AUT)
Extra-lightweight (60 kg)	Ruben Houkes (NED)	Nestor Khergiani (GEO)	Choi Min-Ho (KOR)
Half-lightweight (66 kg)	João Derly (BRA)	Yordanis Arencibia (CUB)	Arash Miresmaeili (IRI)
Half-lightweight (66 kg)	João Derly (BRA)	Yordanis Arencibia (CUB)	Miklós Ungvári (HUN)
Lightweight (73 kg)	Wang Ki-chun (KOR)	Elnur Mammadli (AZE)	Yusuke Kanamaru (JPN)
Lightweight (73 kg)	Wang Ki-chun (KOR)	Elnur Mammadli (AZE)	Rasul Bokiev (TJK)
Half-middleweight (81 kg)	Tiago Camilo (BRA)	Anthony Rodriguez (FRA)	Guillaume Elmont (NED)
Half-middleweight (81 kg)	Tiago Camilo (BRA)	Anthony Rodriguez (FRA)	Euan Burton (GBR)
Middleweight (90 kg)	Irakli Tsirekidze (GEO)	Ilias Iliadis (GRE)	Roberto Meloni (ITA)
Middleweight (90 kg)	Irakli Tsirekidze (GEO)	Ilias Iliadis (GRE)	Ivan Pershin (RUS)
Half-heavyweight (100 kg)	Luciano Corrêa (BRA)	Peter Cousins (GBR)	Dániel Hadfi (HUN)
Half-heavyweight (100 kg)	Luciano Corrêa (BRA)	Peter Cousins (GBR)	Oreidis Despaigne (CUB)
Heavyweight (+100 kg)	Teddy Riner (FRA)	Tamerlan Tmenov (RUS)	Lasha Gujejiani (GEO)
Heavyweight (+100 kg)	Teddy Riner (FRA)	Tamerlan Tmenov (RUS)	João Gabriel Schlittler (BRA)
Openweight	Yasuyuki Muneta (JPN)	Juri Rybak (BLR)	Matthieu Bataille (FRA)
Openweight	Yasuyuki Muneta (JPN)	Juri Rybak (BLR)	Abdullo Tangriev (UZB)

=== Women ===
Event	Gold	Silver	Bronze
Extra-lightweight (48 kg)	Ryoko Tani (JPN)	Yanet Bermoy (CUB)	Frédérique Jossinet (FRA)
Extra-lightweight (48 kg)	Ryoko Tani (JPN)	Yanet Bermoy (CUB)	Alina Dumitru (ROU)
Half-lightweight (52 kg)	Shi Junjie (CHN)	Telma Monteiro (POR)	An Kum-ae (PRK)
Half-lightweight (52 kg)	Shi Junjie (CHN)	Telma Monteiro (POR)	Yuka Nishida (JPN)
Lightweight (57 kg)	Kye Sun-hui (PRK)	Isabel Fernández (ESP)	Aiko Sato (JPN)
Lightweight (57 kg)	Kye Sun-hui (PRK)	Isabel Fernández (ESP)	Bernadett Baczkó (HUN)
Half-middleweight (63 kg)	Driulis González (CUB)	Lucie Décosse (FRA)	Elisabeth Willeboordse (NED)
Half-middleweight (63 kg)	Driulis González (CUB)	Lucie Décosse (FRA)	Ayumi Tanimoto (JPN)
Middleweight (70 kg)	Gévrise Émane (FRA)	Ronda Rousey (USA)	Ylenia Scapin (ITA)
Middleweight (70 kg)	Gévrise Émane (FRA)	Ronda Rousey (USA)	Anett Mészáros (HUN)
Half-heavyweight (78 kg)	Yurisel Laborde (CUB)	Sae Nakazawa (JPN)	Stéphanie Possamaï (FRA)
Half-heavyweight (78 kg)	Yurisel Laborde (CUB)	Sae Nakazawa (JPN)	Jeong Gyeong-Mi (KOR)
Heavyweight (+78 kg)	Tong Wen (CHN)	Maki Tsukada (JPN)	Sandra Köppen (GER)
Heavyweight (+78 kg)	Tong Wen (CHN)	Maki Tsukada (JPN)	Carola Uilenhoed (NED)
Openweight	Maki Tsukada (JPN)	Lucija Polavder (SLO)	Anne-Sophie Mondière (FRA)
Openweight	Maki Tsukada (JPN)	Lucija Polavder (SLO)	Elena Ivashchenko (RUS)

=== Medal table ===
* Host nation (Brazil)

Rank	Nation	Gold	Silver	Bronze	Total
1	Japan	3	2	4	9
2	Brazil*	3	0	1	4
3	France	2	2	4	8
4	Cuba	2	2	1	5
5	China	2	0	0	2
6	Georgia	1	1	1	3
7	Netherlands	1	0	3	4
8	South Korea	1	0	2	3
9	North Korea	1	0	1	2
10	Russia	0	1	2	3
11	Great Britain	0	1	1	2
12	Azerbaijan	0	1	0	1
12	Belarus	0	1	0	1
12	Greece	0	1	0	1
12	Portugal	0	1	0	1
12	Slovenia	0	1	0	1
12	Spain	0	1	0	1
12	United States	0	1	0	1
19	Hungary	0	0	4	4
20	Italy	0	0	2	2
21	Austria	0	0	1	1
21	Germany	0	0	1	1
21	Iran	0	0	1	1
21	Romania	0	0	1	1
21	Tajikistan	0	0	1	1
21	Uzbekistan	0	0	1	1
Totals (26 entries)		16	16	32	64

== Results overview ==
=== Men ===
==== 60 kg ====
16 September – Final

Position	Judoka	Country
1.	Ruben Houkes	Netherlands
2.	Nestor Khergiani	Georgia
3.	Ludwig Paischer	Austria
3.	Choi Min-Ho	South Korea
5.	Rok Drakšič	Slovenia
5.	Khashbaataryn Tsagaanbaatar	Mongolia
7.	Tatsuaki Egusa	Japan
7.	Cemal Oğuz	Turkey

==== 66 kg ====
15 September – Final

Position	Judoka	Country
1.	João Derly	Brazil
2.	Yordanis Arencibia	Cuba
3.	Arash Miresmaeili	Iran
3.	Miklós Ungvári	Hungary
5.	Giovanni Casale	Italy
5.	Armen Nazaryan	Armenia
7.	Andreas Mitterfellner	Austria
7.	Sasha Mehmedovic	Canada

==== 73 kg ====
15 September – Final

Position	Judoka	Country
1.	Wang Ki-chun	South Korea
2.	Elnur Mammadli	Azerbaijan
3.	Yusuke Kanamaru	Japan
3.	Rasul Bokiev	Tajikistan
5.	Sezer Huysuz	Turkey
5.	David Kevkhishvili	Georgia
7.	Konstantin Semenov	Belarus
7.	Robert Gess	Germany

==== 81 kg ====
14 September – Final

Position	Judoka	Country
1.	Tiago Camilo	Brazil
2.	Anthony Rodriguez	France
3.	Guillaume Elmont	Netherlands
3.	Euan Burton	Great Britain
5.	Robert Krawczyk	Poland
5.	Giuseppe Maddaloni	Italy
7.	Kwon Young Woo	South Korea
7.	Tomislav Marijanović	Croatia

==== 90 kg ====
14 September – Final

Position	Judoka	Country
1.	Irakli Tsirekidze	Georgia
2	Ilias Iliadis	Greece
3.	Roberto Meloni	Italy
3.	Ivan Pershin	Russia
5.	Mark Huizinga	Netherlands
5.	Hesham Mesbah	Egypt
7.	Winston Gordon	Great Britain
7.	Elkhan Mammadov	Azerbaijan

==== 100 kg ====
13 September – Final

Position	Judoka	Country
1.	Luciano Corrêa	Brazil
2.	Peter Cousins	Great Britain
3.	Dániel Hadfi	Hungary
3.	Oreidis Despaigne	Cuba
5.	Amel Mekić	Bosnia and Herzegovina
5.	Levan Zhorzholiani	Georgia
7.	Vitaliy Bubon	Ukraine
7.	Utkir Kurbanov	Uzbekistan

==== +100 kg ====
13 September – Final

Position	Judoka	Country
1.	Teddy Riner	France
2.	Tamerlan Tmenov	Russia
3.	Lasha Gujejiani	Georgia
3.	João Gabriel Schlittler	Brazil
5.	Kosei Inoue	Japan
5.	Xiangjun Wei	China
7.	Abdullo Tangriev	Uzbekistan
7.	Óscar Brayson	Cuba

==== Open class ====
16 September – Final

Position	Judoka	Country
1.	Yasuyuki Muneta	Japan
2.	Juri Rybak	Belarus
3.	Matthieu Bataille	France
3.	Abdullo Tangriev	Uzbekistan
5.	Daniel Hernandes	Brazil
5.	Naidangiin Tüvshinbayar	Mongolia
7.	Franz Birkfellner	Austria
7.	Moulud Miraliev	Azerbaijan

=== Women ===
==== 48 kg ====
16 September – Final

Position	Judoka	Country
1.	Ryoko Tani	Japan
2.	Yanet Bermoit	Cuba
3.	Frédérique Jossinet	France
3.	Alina Dumitru	Romania
5.	Paula Pareto	Argentina
5.	Kim Yong-Ram	South Korea
7.	Éva Csernoviczki	Hungary
7.	Tatiana Moskvina	Belarus

==== 52 kg ====
15 September – Final

Position	Judoka	Country
1.	Shi Junjie	China
2.	Telma Monteiro	Portugal
3.	An Kum-ae	North Korea
3.	Yuka Nishida	Japan
5.	Kim Kyung-Ok	South Korea
5.	Érika Miranda	Brazil
7.	Soraya Haddad	Algeria
7.	Georgina Singleton	Great Britain

==== 57 kg ====
15 September – Final

Position	Judoka	Country
1.	Kye Sun-hui	North Korea
2.	Isabel Fernández	Spain
3.	Aiko Sato	Japan
3.	Bernadett Baczkó	Hungary
5.	Nina Koivumäki	Finland
5.	Giulia Quintavalle	Italy
7.	Yvonne Bönisch	Germany
7.	Faith Pitman	Great Britain

==== 63 kg ====
14 September – Final

Position	Judoka	Country
1.	Driulis González	Cuba
2.	Lucie Décosse	France
3.	Elisabeth Willeboordse	Netherlands
3.	Ayumi Tanimoto	Japan
5.	Anna von Harnier	Germany
5.	Urška Žolnir	Slovenia
7.	Claudia Heill	Austria
7.	Ja-Young Kong	South Korea

==== 70 kg ====
14 September – Final

Position	Judoka	Country
1.	Gévrise Émane	France
2.	Ronda Rousey	United States
3.	Ylenia Scapin	Italy
3.	Anett Mészáros	Hungary
5.	Edith Bosch	Netherlands
5.	Maryna Pryshchepa	Ukraine
7.	Leire Iglesias	Spain
7.	Yalennis Castillo	Cuba

==== 78 kg ====
13 September – Final

Position	Judoka	Country
1.	Yurisel Laborde	Cuba
2.	Sae Nakazawa	Japan
3.	Stéphanie Possamaï	France
3.	Kyung-Mi Jung	South Korea
5.	Lucia Morico	Italy
5.	Yang Xiuli	China
7.	Edinanci Silva	Brazil
7.	Houda Miled	Tunisia

==== +78 kg ====
13 September – Final

Position	Judoka	Country
1.	Tong Wen	China
2.	Maki Tsukada	Japan
3.	Sandra Köppen	Germany
3.	Carola Uilenhoed	Netherlands
5.	Karina Bryant	Great Britain
5.	Anne-Sophie Mondière	France
7.	Urszula Sadkowska	Poland
7.	Nihel Chikhrouhou	Tunisia

==== Open class ====
16 September – Final

Position	Judoka	Country
1.	Maki Tsukada	Japan
2.	Lucija Polavder	Slovenia
3.	Anne-Sophie Mondière	France
3.	Elena Ivashchenko	Russia
5.	Yuliya Barysik	Belarus
5.	Idalys Ortiz	Cuba
7.	Liu Huanyuan	China
7.	Dorjgotovyn Tserenkhand	Mongolia
