= 2010 World Judo Championships – Women's +78 kg =

Judo competition

Judo Women's +78 kg at the 2010 World Judo Championships
- Venue: Yoyogi National Gymnasium
- Location: Tokyo, Japan
- Date: 9 September 2010
- Competitors: 31 from 24 nations

Medalists
| gold medal | Mika Sugimoto (1st title) | Japan |
| silver medal | Qin Qian | China |
| bronze medal | Idalys Ortiz | Cuba |
| bronze medal | Maki Tsukada | Japan |

Competition at external databases
- Links: IJF • JudoInside

The Women's +78 kg competition at the 2010 World Judo Championships was held at 9 September at the Yoyogi National Gymnasium in Tokyo, Japan. 31 competitors contested for the medals, being split in 4 Pools where the winner advanced to the medal round.

== Pool A ==
| Quarterfinals | | Semifinals | | Final |
| (Slovenia) Lucija Polavder | 000 |
| (China) Liu Huanyuan | 100 | (China) Liu Huanyuan | 100 |
| (United Kingdom) Karina Bryant | 001 | (Netherlands) Carola Uilenhoed | 000 |
| (Netherlands) Carola Uilenhoed | 010 | | | (China) Liu Huanyuan | 000 |
| (Ukraine) Maryna Prokofyeva | 000 | | | (Japan) Mika Sugimoto | 100 |
| (Japan) Mika Sugimoto | 100 | (Japan) Mika Sugimoto | 100 |
| (South Korea) Kim Ji-youn | 000 | (Russia) Tea Donguzashvili | 000 |
| (Russia) Tea Donguzashvili | 100 |

== Pool B ==
| Quarterfinals | | Semifinals | | Final |
| (Cuba) Idalys Ortiz | 100 |
| (Chinese Taipei) Huang Tzu-Chin | 000 | (Cuba) Idalys Ortiz | 100 |
| (Bosnia and Herzegovina) Larisa Ceric | 000 | (Turkey) Gülşah Kocatürk | 000 |
| (Turkey) Gülşah Kocatürk | 100 | | | (Cuba) Idalys Ortiz | 012 |
| (Poland) Urszula Sadkowska | 100 | | | (Poland) Urszula Sadkowska | 000 |
| (United States) Toni Geiger | 000 | (Poland) Urszula Sadkowska | 100 |
| (Thailand) Thonthan Bunduang | 000 | (Mexico) Vanessa Zambotti | 010 |
| (Mexico) Vanessa Zambotti | 101 |

== Pool C ==
Quarterfinals
(China) Qin Qian | 020
(United States) Nina Cutro-Kelly | 000
(Kazakhstan) Gulzhan Issanova | 000
(Germany) Franziska Konitz | 100
(France) Stéphanie Possamaï | 001
(Russia) Polina Belousova | 000

Semifinals
(China) Qin Qian | 100
(Germany) Franziska Konitz | 000
(South Korea) Kim Na-Young | 011
(France) Stéphanie Possamaï | 000

Final
(China) Qin Qian | 010
(South Korea) Kim Na-Young | 001

== Pool D ==
| Quarterfinals | | Semifinals | | Final |
| (Japan) Maki Tsukada | 100 |
| (Brazil) Maria Suelen Altheman | 010 | (Japan) Maki Tsukada | 020 |
| (United Kingdom) Sarah Adlington | 002 | (Ukraine) Iryna Kindzerska | 000 |
| (Ukraine) Iryna Kindzerska | 101 | | | (Japan) Maki Tsukada | 100 |
| (Tunisia) Nihel Chikhrouhou | 002 | | | (Mongolia) Dorjgotovyn Tserenkhand | 001 |
| (Australia) Janelle Shepherd | 000 | (Tunisia) Nihel Chikhrouhou | 000 |
| (Ecuador) Carmen Chalá | 000 | (Mongolia) Dorjgotovyn Tserenkhand | 100 |
| (Mongolia) Dorjgotovyn Tserenkhand | 101 |

== Repechage ==
| Repechage | | Third place |
| (China) Liu Huanyuan | 021 |
| (Poland) Urszula Sadkowska | 000 | (China) Liu Huanyuan | 000 |
| | | (Japan) Maki Tsukada | 100 |

| Repechage | | Third place |
| (South Korea) Kim Na-Young | 110 |
| (Mongolia) Dorjgotovyn Tserenkhand | 000 | (South Korea) Kim Na-Young | 001 |
| | | (Cuba) Idalys Ortiz | 002 |

== Finals ==
Semi-finals
(Japan) Mika Sugimoto | 100
(Cuba) Idalys Ortiz | 000
(China) Qin Qian | 010
(Japan) Maki Tsukada | 001

Final
(Japan) Mika Sugimoto | 100
(China) Qin Qian | 000
