= 2011 World Judo Championships – Women's +78 kg =

Judo competition

Judo Women's +78 kg at the 2011 World Judo Championships
- Venue: Accor Arena
- Location: Paris, France
- Date: 27 August 2011
- Competitors: 37 from 27 nations

Medalists
gold medal	Tong Wen (4th title)	China
silver medal	Qin Qian	China
bronze medal	Mika Sugimoto	Japan
bronze medal	Elena Ivashchenko	Russia

Competition at external databases
- Links: IJF • JudoInside

The women's +78 kg competition of the 2011 World Judo Championships was held on August 27.

== Medalists ==
Gold	Silver	Bronze
Tong Wen (CHN)	Qin Qian (CHN)	Mika Sugimoto (JPN); Elena Ivashchenko (RUS)

== Results ==
=== Pool A ===
First Round
(Japan) Megumi Tachimoto	010
(Mexico) Vanessa Zambotti	000
(Turkey) Belkıs Zehra Kaya	000
(China) Tong Wen	100

Quarterfinals
(Japan) Megumi Tachimoto	011
(South Korea) Kim Ji-youn	000
(Ukraine) Iryna Kindzerska	000
(Germany) Franziska Konitz	100
(Russia) Tea Donguzashvili	000
(China) Tong Wen	101
(Tunisia) Nihel Chikhrouhou	100
(Netherlands) Carola Uilenhoed	000

Semifinals
(Japan) Megumi Tachimoto	100
(Germany) Franziska Konitz	000
(China) Tong Wen	111
(Tunisia) Nihel Chikhrouhou	000

Final
(Japan) Megumi Tachimoto	000
(China) Tong Wen	101

=== Pool B ===
First Round
(Senegal) Monica Sagna	002
(Kazakhstan) Zarina Abdrassulova	101

Quarterfinals
(Slovenia) Lucija Polavder	102
(United Kingdom) Sarah Adlington	001
(Mongolia) Dorjgotovyn Tserenkhand	000
(France) Anne-Sophie Mondière	100
(Cuba) Idalys Ortiz	100
(Kazakhstan) Zarina Abdrassulova	000
(Morocco) Rania El Kilali	000
(Brazil) Maria Suelen Altheman	100

Semifinals
(Slovenia) Lucija Polavder	101
(France) Anne-Sophie Mondière	001
(Cuba) Idalys Ortiz	001
(Brazil) Maria Suelen Altheman	000

Final
(Slovenia) Lucija Polavder	000
(Cuba) Idalys Ortiz	100

=== Pool C ===
First Round
(Bosnia and Herzegovina) Larisa Ceric	000
(Poland) Urszula Sadkowska	111

Quarterfinals
(China) Qin Qian	001
(France) Ketty Mathe	000
(Italy) Lucia Tangorre	001
(United States) Nina Cutro-Kelly	100
(Turkey) Gülşah Kocatürk	000
(Poland) Urszula Sadkowska	100
(United Kingdom) Karina Bryant	101
(Venezuela) Giovanna Blanco	000

Semifinals
(China) Qin Qian	101
(United States) Nina Cutro-Kelly	000
(Poland) Urszula Sadkowska	001
(United Kingdom) Karina Bryant	100

Final
(China) Qin Qian	100
(United Kingdom) Karina Bryant	000

=== Pool D ===
First Round
(Japan) Mika Sugimoto	100
(Lithuania) Sandra Jablonskyte	000

Quarterfinals
(Japan) Mika Sugimoto	100
(Senegal) Aminata Diatta	000
(Cape Verde) Adysangela Moniz	000
(Algeria) Sonia Asselah	100
(South Korea) Kim Na-Young	001
(Russia) Elena Ivashchenko	100
(Kazakhstan) Gulzhan Issanova	100
(Ukraine) Maryna Prokofieva	000

Semifinals
(Japan) Mika Sugimoto	101
(Algeria) Sonia Asselah	000
(Russia) Elena Ivashchenko	001
(Kazakhstan) Gulzhan Issanova	000

Final
(Japan) Mika Sugimoto	001
(Russia) Elena Ivashchenko	000

=== Repechage ===
Repechage		Third place
(Japan) Megumi Tachimoto	010
(Slovenia) Lucija Polavder	000	(Japan) Megumi Tachimoto	000
		(Japan) Mika Sugimoto	001

Repechage		Third place
(United Kingdom) Karina Bryant	000
(Russia) Elena Ivashchenko	102	(Russia) Elena Ivashchenko	101
		(Cuba) Idalys Ortiz	000

=== Finals ===
Semi-finals
(China) Tong Wen	100
(Cuba) Idalys Ortiz	000
(China) Qin Qian	101
(Japan) Mika Sugimoto	001

Final
(China) Tong Wen	101
(China) Qin Qian	000
