= Judo at the 2008 Summer Olympics – Women's +78 kg =

Women's +78 kg at the Games of the XXIX Olympiad
- Venue: Beijing Science and Technology; University Gymnasium
- Dates: August 15, 2008
- Competitors: 21 from 21 nations
- Winning score: 1001

Medalists
1st place, gold medalist(s)		Tong Wen	China
2nd place, silver medalist(s)		Maki Tsukada	Japan
3rd place, bronze medalist(s)		Lucija Polavder	Slovenia
3rd place, bronze medalist(s)		Idalys Ortiz	Cuba

The women's +78 kg (also known as heavyweight) tournament in the judo at the 2008 Summer Olympics was held on August 15 at the Beijing Science and Technology University Gymnasium. A total of 21 women competed in this event, limited to jūdōka with a body weight of more than 78 kilograms. Preliminary rounds started at 12:00 Noon CST. Repechage finals, semifinals, bouts for bronze medals and the final were held at 18:00pm CST.

This event was the heaviest of the women's judo weight classes, allowing competitors with over 78 kilograms of body mass. Like all other judo events, bouts lasted five minutes. If the bout was still tied at the end, it was extended for another five-minute, sudden-death period; if neither judoka scored during that period, the match is decided by the judges. The tournament bracket consisted of a single-elimination contest culminating in a gold medal match. There was also a repechage to determine the winners of the two bronze medals. Each judoka who had lost to a semifinalist competed in the repechage. The two judokas who lost in the semifinals faced the winner of the opposite half of the bracket's repechage in bronze medal bouts.

== Qualifying athletes ==
Mat	Athlete	Country
1	Sandra Köppen	Germany
1	Michela Torrenti	Italy
1	Janelle Shepherd	Australia
1	Samah Ramadan	Egypt
1	Idalys Ortiz	Cuba
1	Maryna Prokof'yeva	Ukraine
1	Tong Wen	China
1	Tea Donguzashvili	Russia
1	Kim Na-young	South Korea
1	Carmen Chala	Ecuador
1	Nihal Chikhrouhou	Tunisia
2	Mariya Shekerova	Uzbekistan
2	Anne-Sophie Mondière	France
2	Maki Tsukada	Japan
2	Vanessa Zambotti	Mexico
2	Karina Bryant	Great Britain
2	Carola Uilenhoed	Netherlands
2	Dorjgotovyn Tserenkhand	Mongolia
2	Gulzhan Issanova	Kazakhstan
2	Urszula Sadkowska	Poland
2	Lucija Polavder	Slovenia

== Tournament results ==
=== Final ===
Final
1	Tong Wen (CHN)	1001
2	Maki Tsukada (JPN)	0010

=== Mat 1 ===
Round of 32
Michela Torrenti (ITA)	0000
Janelle Shepherd (AUS)	0001
Tong Wen (CHN)	1000
Tea Donguzashvili (RUS)	0000
Carmen Chala (ECU)	0000
Nihal Chikhrouhou (TUN)	1000

Round of 16
Sandra Köppen (GER)	0000
Janelle Shepherd (AUS)	0110
Samah Ramadan (EGY)	0000
Idalys Ortiz (CUB)	0110
Maryna Prokof'yeva (UKR)	0000
Tong Wen (CHN)	1000
Kim Na-young (KOR)	0011
Nihal Chikhrouhou (TUN)	0001

Quarterfinals
Janelle Shepherd (AUS)	0000
Idalys Ortiz (CUB)	1000
Tong Wen (CHN)	1001
Kim Na-young (KOR)	0000

Semifinals
Idalys Ortiz (CUB)	0000
Tong Wen (CHN)	0010

=== Mat 2 ===
First Round
Mariya Shekerova (UZB)	0000
Anne-Sophie Mondière (FRA)	0200
Gulzhan Issanova (KAZ)	0101
Urszula Sadkowska (POL)	0010

Round of 16
Anne-Sophie Mondière (FRA)	0001
Maki Tsukada (JPN)	1000
Vanessa Zambotti (MEX)	0021
Karina Bryant (GBR)	0001
Carola Uilenhoed (NED)	0001
Dorjgotovyn Tserenkhand (MGL)	0010
Gulzhan Issanova (KAZ)	0001
Lucija Polavder (SLO)	1000

Quarterfinals
Maki Tsukada (JPN)	1000
Vanessa Zambotti (MEX)	0000
Dorjgotovyn Tserenkhand (MGL)	0000
Lucija Polavder (SLO)	1100

Semifinals
Maki Tsukada (JPN)	1010
Lucija Polavder (SLO)	0000

=== Repechage ===
First round
Samah Ramadan (EGY)
BYE
Tea Donguzashvili (RUS)	0010
Maryna Prokof'yeva (UKR)	0000
Anne-Sophie Mondière (FRA)
BYE
Gulzhan Issanova (KAZ)
BYE

Second round
Janelle Shepherd (AUS)	0000
Samah Ramadan (EGY)	1000
Kim Na-young (KOR)	1000
Tea Donguzashvili (RUS)	0000
Vanessa Zambotti (MEX)	0000
Anne-Sophie Mondière (FRA)	1010
Dorjgotovyn Tserenkhand (MGL)	1000
Gulzhan Issanova (KAZ)	0000

Third round
Samah Ramadan (EGY)	0000
Kim Na-young (KOR)	0200
Anne-Sophie Mondière (FRA)	0000
Dorjgotovyn Tserenkhand (MGL)	1000

Bronze medal finals
Lucija Polavder (SLO)	0001
Kim Na-young (KOR)	0000
Idalys Ortiz (CUB)	1000
Dorjgotovyn Tserenkhand (MGL)	0000
