= Judo at the 2006 Asian Games =

Judo competition

- Venue: Qatar SC Indoor Hall
- Dates: 2–5 December 2006
- Competitors: 215 from 35 nations

Judo competed in eight different weight classes for men and women at the 2006 Asian Games in Doha, Qatar. All competition was held in the Qatar Sports Club Indoor Hall.

== Schedule ==
P	Preliminary rounds & Repechage	F	Finals

Event↓/Date →	2nd Sat		3rd Sun		4th Mon		5th Tue	
Men's 60 kg							P	F
Men's 66 kg					P	F		
Men's 73 kg					P	F		
Men's 81 kg			P	F				
Men's 90 kg			P	F				
Men's 100 kg	P	F						
Men's +100 kg	P	F						
Men's openweight							P	F
Women's 48 kg							P	F
Women's 52 kg					P	F		
Women's 57 kg					P	F		
Women's 63 kg			P	F				
Women's 70 kg			P	F				
Women's 78 kg	P	F						
Women's +78 kg	P	F						
Women's openweight							P	F

== Medalists ==
=== Men ===
Event	Gold	Silver	Bronze
Extra lightweight (−60 kg)	Tatsuaki Egusa; Japan	Cho Nam-suk; South Korea	Masoud Haji Akhondzadeh; Iran
Extra lightweight (−60 kg)	Tatsuaki Egusa; Japan	Cho Nam-suk; South Korea	Salamat Utarbayev; Kazakhstan
Half lightweight (−66 kg)	Khashbaataryn Tsagaanbaatar; Mongolia	Arash Miresmaeili; Iran	Kim Kwang-sub; South Korea
Half lightweight (−66 kg)	Khashbaataryn Tsagaanbaatar; Mongolia	Arash Miresmaeili; Iran	Hiroyuki Akimoto; Japan
Lightweight (−73 kg)	Lee Won-hee; South Korea	Masahiro Takamatsu; Japan	Shokir Muminov; Uzbekistan
Lightweight (−73 kg)	Lee Won-hee; South Korea	Masahiro Takamatsu; Japan	Rasul Boqiev; Tajikistan
Half middleweight (−81 kg)	Damdinsürengiin Nyamkhüü; Mongolia	Almas Atayev; Kazakhstan	Guo Lei; China
Half middleweight (−81 kg)	Damdinsürengiin Nyamkhüü; Mongolia	Almas Atayev; Kazakhstan	Takashi Ono; Japan
Middleweight (−90 kg)	Hwang Hee-tae; South Korea	Maxim Rakov; Kazakhstan	Ramziddin Sayidov; Uzbekistan
Middleweight (−90 kg)	Hwang Hee-tae; South Korea	Maxim Rakov; Kazakhstan	Hiroshi Izumi; Japan
Half heavyweight (−100 kg)	Jang Sung-ho; South Korea	Satoshi Ishii; Japan	Askhat Zhitkeyev; Kazakhstan
Half heavyweight (−100 kg)	Jang Sung-ho; South Korea	Satoshi Ishii; Japan	Utkir Kurbanov; Uzbekistan
Heavyweight (+100 kg)	Yasuyuki Muneta; Japan	Mohammad Reza Roudaki; Iran	Abdullo Tangriev; Uzbekistan
Heavyweight (+100 kg)	Yasuyuki Muneta; Japan	Mohammad Reza Roudaki; Iran	Yeldos Ikhsangaliyev; Kazakhstan
Openweight	Kim Sung-bum; South Korea	Mahmoud Miran; Iran	Askhat Zhitkeyev; Kazakhstan
Openweight	Kim Sung-bum; South Korea	Mahmoud Miran; Iran	Yohei Takai; Japan

=== Women ===
Event	Gold	Silver	Bronze
Extra lightweight (−48 kg)	Gao Feng; China	Kim Young-ran; South Korea	Kelbet Nurgazina; Kazakhstan
Extra lightweight (−48 kg)	Gao Feng; China	Kim Young-ran; South Korea	Misato Nakamura; Japan
Half lightweight (−52 kg)	An Kum-ae; North Korea	Mönkhbaataryn Bundmaa; Mongolia	Li Ying; China
Half lightweight (−52 kg)	An Kum-ae; North Korea	Mönkhbaataryn Bundmaa; Mongolia	Yuki Yokosawa; Japan
Lightweight (−57 kg)	Xu Yan; China	Aiko Sato; Japan	Kang Sin-young; South Korea
Lightweight (−57 kg)	Xu Yan; China	Aiko Sato; Japan	Hong Ok-song; North Korea
Half middleweight (−63 kg)	Xu Yuhua; China	Kong Ja-young; South Korea	Ayumi Tanimoto; Japan
Half middleweight (−63 kg)	Xu Yuhua; China	Kong Ja-young; South Korea	Won Ok-im; North Korea
Middleweight (−70 kg)	Masae Ueno; Japan	Bae Eun-hye; South Korea	Qin Dongya; China
Middleweight (−70 kg)	Masae Ueno; Japan	Bae Eun-hye; South Korea	Liu Shu-yun; Chinese Taipei
Half heavyweight (−78 kg)	Sae Nakazawa; Japan	Lee So-yeon; South Korea	Yang Xiuli; China
Half heavyweight (−78 kg)	Sae Nakazawa; Japan	Lee So-yeon; South Korea	Pürevjargalyn Lkhamdegd; Mongolia
Heavyweight (+78 kg)	Tong Wen; China	Dorjgotovyn Tserenkhand; Mongolia	Kim Na-young; South Korea
Heavyweight (+78 kg)	Tong Wen; China	Dorjgotovyn Tserenkhand; Mongolia	Midori Shintani; Japan
Openweight	Liu Huanyuan; China	Dorjgotovyn Tserenkhand; Mongolia	Mai Tateyama; Japan
Openweight	Liu Huanyuan; China	Dorjgotovyn Tserenkhand; Mongolia	Gulzhan Issanova; Kazakhstan

== Medal table ==
Rank	Nation	Gold	Silver	Bronze	Total
1	China (CHN)	5	0	4	9
2	South Korea (KOR)	4	5	3	12
3	Japan (JPN)	4	3	9	16
4	Mongolia (MGL)	2	3	1	6
5	North Korea (PRK)	1	0	2	3
6	Iran (IRI)	0	3	1	4
7	Kazakhstan (KAZ)	0	2	6	8
8	Uzbekistan (UZB)	0	0	4	4
9	Chinese Taipei (TPE)	0	0	1	1
9	Tajikistan (TJK)	0	0	1	1
Totals (10 entries)		16	16	32	64

== Participating nations ==
A total of 215 athletes from 35 nations competed in judo at the 2006 Asian Games:

- Afghanistan (1)
- Bahrain (1)
- Bangladesh (2)
- Cambodia (2)
- China (14)
- Chinese Taipei (3)
- Hong Kong (4)
- India (6)
- Indonesia (2)
- Iran (8)
- Japan (16)
- Kazakhstan (13)
- Kuwait (5)
- Kyrgyzstan (8)
- Laos (2)
- Lebanon (4)
- Macau (4)
- Mongolia (14)
- Nepal (2)
- North Korea (9)
- Pakistan (2)
- Palestine (4)
- Philippines (6)
- Qatar (8)
- Saudi Arabia (5)
- South Korea (16)
- Sri Lanka (3)
- Syria (5)
- Tajikistan (7)
- Thailand (9)
- Turkmenistan (7)
- United Arab Emirates (2)
- Uzbekistan (12)
- Vietnam (7)
- Yemen (2)
