= Judo at the 2009 East Asian Games =

Judo competition

Judo Judo at the 2009 East Asian Games
- Venue: Shek Kip Mei Park Sports Centre
- Location: Shek Kip Mei, Hong Kong
- Dates: 12–13 December 2009
- Nations: 9

The Judo competition at the 2009 East Asian Games was contested in nine weight classes, nine each for men and women.

This competition was held at Shek Kip Mei Park, from 12 to 13 December 2009.

== Medal overview ==
=== Men ===
Event	Gold	Silver	Bronze
(55 kg)	Yu Kin-Ting (HKG)	Wang Guogui (CHN)	Hoi Ka-Fong (MAC)
(55 kg)	Yu Kin-Ting (HKG)	Wang Guogui (CHN)	none
Extra-lightweight (60 kg)	Kim Kyong-Jin (PRK)	Daisuke Asano (JPN)	Bayar Dagvadorj (MGL)
Extra-lightweight (60 kg)	Kim Kyong-Jin (PRK)	Daisuke Asano (JPN)	Li Hui (CHN)
Half-lightweight (66 kg)	Musashi Ogura (JPN)	Ri Chol Ryong (PRK)	Cho Jun-Ho (KOR)
Half-lightweight (66 kg)	Musashi Ogura (JPN)	Ri Chol Ryong (PRK)	Liu Renwang (CHN)
Lightweight (73 kg)	Hiroyuki Akimoto (JPN)	Si Rijigawa (CHN)	Kim Won-Jung (KOR)
Lightweight (73 kg)	Hiroyuki Akimoto (JPN)	Si Rijigawa (CHN)	Kim Chol-Su (PRK)
Half-middleweight (81 kg)	Song Dae-Nam (KOR)	Li Yewen (CHN)	Yasuhiro Ebi (JPN)
Half-middleweight (81 kg)	Song Dae-Nam (KOR)	Li Yewen (CHN)	Gan Tuvshinjargal (MGL)
Middleweight (90 kg)	Masashi Nishiyama (JPN)	Pak Song Il (PRK)	Kwon Young-Woo (KOR)
Middleweight (90 kg)	Masashi Nishiyama (JPN)	Pak Song Il (PRK)	Erdenebilegiin Enkhbat (MGL)
Half-heavyweight (100 kg)	Kayhan Ozcicek-Takagi (JPN)	Batsuuri Bat-Orshikh (MGL)	Shao Ning (CHN)
Half-heavyweight (100 kg)	Kayhan Ozcicek-Takagi (JPN)	Batsuuri Bat-Orshikh (MGL)	Sin Kyeong-Seob (KOR)
Heavyweight (+100 kg)	Yohei Takai (JPN)	Liu Jian (CHN)	N. Tüvshinbayar (MGL)
Heavyweight (+100 kg)	Yohei Takai (JPN)	Liu Jian (CHN)	Kim Soo-Whan (KOR)
Openweight	Kim Soo-Whan (KOR)	Yohei Takai (JPN)	Liu Jian (CHN)
Openweight	Kim Soo-Whan (KOR)	Yohei Takai (JPN)	Batsuuri Bat-Orshikh (MGL)

=== Women ===
Event	Gold	Silver	Bronze
Extra-lightweight (45 kg)	Xie Shishi (CHN)	Leong Siu-Pou (MAC)	Lui Wing-Yin (HKG)
Extra-lightweight (45 kg)	Xie Shishi (CHN)	Leong Siu-Pou (MAC)	none
(48 kg)	Haruna Asami (JPN)	Pak Ok-Song (PRK)	Ye Meixin (CHN)
(48 kg)	Haruna Asami (JPN)	Pak Ok-Song (PRK)	Baljinnyamyn Bat-Erdene (MGL)
Half-lightweight (52 kg)	Chiho Kagaya (JPN)	Choi Keum-Mai (KOR)	Zhu Ang (CHN)
Half-lightweight (52 kg)	Chiho Kagaya (JPN)	Choi Keum-Mai (KOR)	Vong Chi-Leng (MAC)
Lightweight (57 kg)	Nae Udaka (JPN)	Rim Yun-Hui (PRK)	Park Hyo-Ju (KOR)
Lightweight (57 kg)	Nae Udaka (JPN)	Rim Yun-Hui (PRK)	Lien Chen-ling (TPE)
Half-middleweight (63 kg)	Miki Tanaka (JPN)	Joung Da-Woon (KOR)	Won Ok-Im (PRK)
Half-middleweight (63 kg)	Miki Tanaka (JPN)	Joung Da-Woon (KOR)	Chen Chia-Hsin (TPE)
Middleweight (70 kg)	Choi Mi-Young (KOR)	Dou Shumei (CHN)	Hyon Jong-Hui (PRK)
Middleweight (70 kg)	Choi Mi-Young (KOR)	Dou Shumei (CHN)	N. Tsend-Aylish (MGL)
Half-heavyweight (78 kg)	Hitomi Ikeda (JPN)	Park Jong-Won (KOR)	Turbat Baasanjav (MGL)
Half-heavyweight (78 kg)	Hitomi Ikeda (JPN)	Park Jong-Won (KOR)	none
Middleweight (+78 kg)	Qin Qian (CHN)	Kim Na-Young (KOR)	Mai Tateyama (JPN)
Middleweight (+78 kg)	Qin Qian (CHN)	Kim Na-Young (KOR)	Tsai Hsiu-Ya (TPE)
Openweight	Qin Qian (CHN)	N. Tsend-Aylish (MGL)	Kim Na-Young (KOR)
Openweight	Qin Qian (CHN)	N. Tsend-Aylish (MGL)	Tsai Hsiu-Ya (TPE)

=== Medals table ===
Rank	Nation	Gold	Silver	Bronze	Total
1	Japan	10	2	2	14
2	China	3	5	6	14
3	South Korea	3	4	7	14
4	North Korea	1	4	3	8
5	Hong Kong	1	0	1	2
6	Mongolia	0	2	8	10
7	Macau	0	1	2	3
8	Chinese Taipei	0	0	4	4
Totals (8 entries)		18	18	33	69
