= Judo at the 2006 Asian Games – Men's 60 kg =

Judo competition

Men's 60 kg at the 2006 Asian Games
- Venue: Qatar SC Indoor Hall
- Date: 5 December 2006
- Competitors: 22 from 22 nations

Medalists
gold medal	Tatsuaki Egusa	Japan
silver medal	Cho Nam-suk	South Korea
bronze medal	Masoud Haji Akhondzadeh	Iran
bronze medal	Salamat Utarbayev	Kazakhstan

The men's 60 kilograms (Extra lightweight) competition at the 2006 Asian Games in Doha was held on 5 December at the Qatar SC Indoor Hall.

== Schedule ==
All times are Arabia Standard Time (UTC+03:00)

Date	Time	Event
Tuesday, 5 December 2006	14:00	Round of 32
Tuesday, 5 December 2006	14:00	Round of 16
Tuesday, 5 December 2006	14:00	Quarterfinals
Tuesday, 5 December 2006	14:00	Repechage −2R
Tuesday, 5 December 2006	14:00	Repechage −1R
Tuesday, 5 December 2006	14:00	Repechage final
Tuesday, 5 December 2006	14:00	Semifinals
Tuesday, 5 December 2006	14:00	Finals

== Results ==
Legend

- WO — Won by walkover

=== Main bracket ===
==== Final ====
Gold medal contest
Tatsuaki Egusa (JPN)	0021
Cho Nam-suk (KOR)	0001

==== Top half ====
Round of 32
Chanchai Suksuwan (THA)	0000
Tsagaanbaataryn Tengis (MGL)	1000
Tatsuaki Egusa (JPN)	1100
Chindavon Syvanevilay (LAO)	0000
Ramazan Hilou (KGZ)	0000
Olimjon Zikaev (TJK)	1001

Round of 16
Tsagaanbaataryn Tengis (MGL)	0100
Kim Kyong-jin (PRK)	1001
Salamat Utarbayev (KAZ)	0100
Navjot Chana (IND)	0011
Ali Khousrof (YEM)	0000
Tatsuaki Egusa (JPN)	1001
Lin Chueh-chen (TPE)	1000
Olimjon Zikaev (TJK)	0000

Quarterfinals
Kim Kyong-jin (PRK)	0010
Salamat Utarbayev (KAZ)	1110
Tatsuaki Egusa (JPN)	1000
Lin Chueh-chen (TPE)	0000

Semifinals
Salamat Utarbayev (KAZ)	0000
Tatsuaki Egusa (JPN)	1001

==== Bottom half ====
Round of 32
Cho Nam-suk (KOR)	1011
Eisa Majrashi (KSA)	0000
Faisal Al-Dhafiri (KUW)
Fadi Darwish (SYR)	WO
Masoud Haji Akhondzadeh (IRI)	1001
Sok Pisith (CAM)	0000

Round of 16
Mirali Sharipov (UZB)	0001
Cho Nam-suk (KOR)	0003
Fadi Darwish (SYR)	0000
Trần Văn Đoạt (VIE)	1001
Masoud Haji Akhondzadeh (IRI)	1101
Ng Im San (MAC)	0000
Jia Yunbing (CHN)	0200
Abbas Mohammed (QAT)	0000

Quarterfinals
Cho Nam-suk (KOR)	1001
Trần Văn Đoạt (VIE)	0000
Masoud Haji Akhondzadeh (IRI)	1121
Jia Yunbing (CHN)	0002

Semifinals
Cho Nam-suk (KOR)	0110
Masoud Haji Akhondzadeh (IRI)	0013

=== Repechage ===
Repechage −2R
Chindavon Syvanevilay (LAO)	0010
Ali Khousrof (YEM)	1110
Eisa Majrashi (KSA)	0000
Mirali Sharipov (UZB)	0011
Sok Pisith (CAM)	0002
Ng Im San (MAC)	1000

Repechage −1R
Navjot Chana (IND)	0010
Kim Kyong-jin (PRK)	0210
Ali Khousrof (YEM)	0001
Lin Chueh-chen (TPE)	0100
Mirali Sharipov (UZB)	1120
Trần Văn Đoạt (VIE)	0000
Ng Im San (MAC)	0000
Jia Yunbing (CHN)	1010

Repechage final
Kim Kyong-jin (PRK)	0000
Lin Chueh-chen (TPE)	1000
Mirali Sharipov (UZB)	0011
Jia Yunbing (CHN)	0111

Bronze medal contest
Lin Chueh-chen (TPE)	0001
Masoud Haji Akhondzadeh (IRI)	0110
Jia Yunbing (CHN)	0010
Salamat Utarbayev (KAZ)	1000
