= Kim Na-young (judoka) =

South Korean judoka (born 1988)

Personal information
- Born: 6 January 1988 (age 38)
- Occupation: Judoka

Korean name
- Hangul: 김나영
- RR: Gim Nayeong
- MR: Kim Nayŏng

Sport
- Country: South Korea
- Sport: Judo
- Weight class: +78 kg, Open

Achievements and titles
- Olympic Games: 5th (2008)
- World Champ.: 5th (2010, 2010)
- Asian Champ.: (silver) (2009, 2010, 2011)
Medal record
Women's judo
Representing South Korea
Asian Games
Silver medal – second place	2010 Guangzhou	Open
Bronze medal – third place	2006 Doha	+78 kg
Bronze medal – third place	2010 Guangzhou	+78 kg
Asian Championships
Silver medal – second place	2009 Taipei	Open
Silver medal – second place	2011 Abu Dhabi	+78 kg
Bronze medal – third place	2009 Taipei	+78 kg
Bronze medal – third place	2012 Tashkent	+78 kg
World Masters
Silver medal – second place	2010 Suwon	+78 kg
Bronze medal – third place	2011 Baku	+78 kg
IJF Grand Slam
Silver medal – second place	2011 Moscow	+78 kg
Bronze medal – third place	2008 Tokyo	+78 kg
Bronze medal – third place	2010 Paris	+78 kg
Bronze medal – third place	2011 Tokyo	+78 kg
IJF Grand Prix
Gold medal – first place	2013 Ulaanbaatar	+78 kg
Silver medal – second place	2012 Düsseldorf	+78 kg
World Juniors Championships
Bronze medal – third place	2006 Santo Domingo	+78 kg
Asian Junior Championships
Bronze medal – third place	2006 Jeju	+78 kg
Summer Universiade
Silver medal – second place	2011 Shenzhen	+78 kg
Bronze medal – third place	2009 Belgrade	Open
East Asian Games
Silver medal – second place	2009 Hong Kong	+78 kg
Bronze medal – third place	2009 Hong Kong	Open

Profile at external databases
- IJF: 62
- JudoInside.com: 40373
- Updated on 20 November 2022

Kim Na-young (born 6 January 1988, Gyeongsangbuk, South Korea) is a South Korean judoka. She won a bronze medal at the +78 kg category of the 2006 Asian Games. In the same weight category she finished 5th at the 2008 Olympics. She beat Nihel Cheikh Rouhou in the quarterfinal, before losing to Tong Wen in the semifinal. Because Tong reached the final, Kim entered the repechage, where she beat Tea Donguzashvili and Samah Ramadan, before losing her bronze medal match to Lucija Polavder.

At the 2012 Summer Olympics, Kim lost her first match to Gulzhan Isanova.
