= 2011 World Judo Open Championships =

Judo competition

Judo 2011 World Judo Open Championships
- Venue: Olympic Training Center "Tyumen Judo"
- Location: Tyumen, Russia
- Dates: 29–30 October 2011
- Competitors: 49 from 22 nations
- Total prize money: 158,000$

Competition at external databases
- Links: IJF • JudoInside

The 2011 World Judo Open Championships were held in Tyumen, Russia, 29–30 October, 2011. The IJF jury accorded the Ippon award to Keiji Suzuki (Japan) and Megumi Tachimoto (Japan) for their spectacular techniques.

== Medal overview ==
=== Men's events ===
Event	Gold	Silver	Bronze
Open	Abdullo Tangriev (UZB)	Barna Bor (HUN)	Aleksandr Mikhailine (RUS)
Open	Abdullo Tangriev (UZB)	Barna Bor (HUN)	Keiji Suzuki (JPN)

=== Women's events ===
Event	Gold	Silver	Bronze
Open	Tong Wen (CHN)	Tea Donguzashvili (RUS)	Mika Sugimoto (JPN)
Open	Tong Wen (CHN)	Tea Donguzashvili (RUS)	Nanami Hashiguchi (JPN)

=== Medals table ===
Rank	Nation	Gold	Silver	Bronze	Total
1	China (CHN)	1	0	0	1
1	Uzbekistan (UZB)	1	0	0	1
3	Russia (RUS)	0	1	1	2
4	Hungary (HUN)	0	1	0	1
5	Japan (JPN)	0	0	3	3
Totals (5 entries)		2	2	4	8

== Tournament results ==
=== Men's event ===
Round of 32
Hernández (CUB)	100
Sarnacki (POL)	000
Tangriev (UZB)	100
Biletskyi (UKR)	000
Thorel (FRA)	001
Prokin (RUS)	000
Islambasic (CRO)	000
Takahashi (JPN)	100
Iliadis (GRE)	000
Hernandes (BRA)	001
Sherrington (GBR)	000
Kim (KOR)	101
Bor (HUN)	010
Jaballah (TUN)	000
Abeuov (KAZ)	001
Resko (LAT)	000
Vucak (CRO)	000
Bataille (FRA)	101
Kambiev (RUS)	100
Jonsson (ISL)	000
Arakelyan (ARM)	000
Suzuki (JPN)	100

Round of 16
Tachiyama (JPN)	001
Hernández (CUB)	000
Tangriev (UZB)	101
Thorel (FRA)	000
Volkov (RUS)	001
Takahashi (JPN)	101
Hernandes (BRA)	000
Kim (KOR)	001
Kamikawa (JPN)	000
Bor (HUN)	001
Abeuov (KAZ)	000
Mikhailine (RUS)	100
Makarau (BLR)	100
Bataille (FRA)	000
Kambiev (RUS)	000
Suzuki (JPN)	110

Quarterfinals
Tachiyama (JPN)	000
Tangriev (UZB)	001
Takahashi (JPN)	000
Kim (KOR)	100
Bor (HUN)	001
Mikhailine (RUS)	000
Makarau (BLR)	000
Suzuki (JPN)	100

Semifinals
Tangriev (UZB)	000
Kim (KOR)	000
Bor (HUN)	100
Suzuki (JPN)	000

Finals
Tangriev (UZB)	100
Bor (HUN)	000

==== Playoff ====
Repechage		Third place playoff
Tachiyama (JPN)	010
Takahashi (JPN)	001	Tachiyama (JPN)	000
		Suzuki (JPN)	100

Repechage		Third place playoff
Mikhailine (RUS)	001
Makarau (BLR)	000	Mikhailine (RUS)	011
		Kim (KOR)	001

=== Women's event ===
Round of 16
Abreu (CUB)	000
Sugimoto (JPN)	100
Hashiguchi (JPN)	100
Sheremetova (RUS)	000
Ivashchenko (RUS)	000
Qin (CHN)	100
Andeol (FRA)	000
Tachimoto (JPN)	101
Donguzashvili (RUS)	010
Kocatürk (TUR)	000

Quarterfinals
Sugimoto (JPN)	100
Sokolova (RUS)	000
Tong (CHN)	100
Hashiguchi (JPN)	000
Qin (CHN)	000
Tachimoto (JPN)	001
Iadkouskaya (BLR)	000
Donguzashvili (RUS)	100

Semifinals
Sugimoto (JPN)	000
Tong (CHN)	100
Tachimoto (JPN)	000
Donguzashvili (RUS)	100

Final
Tong (CHN)	101
Donguzashvili (RUS)	000

==== Playoff ====
Repechage		Third place playoff
Sokolova (RUS)	000
Hashiguchi (JPN)	110	Hashiguchi (JPN)	010
		Tachimoto (JPN)	000

Repechage		Third place playoff
Qin (CHN)	100
Iadkouskaya (BLR)	000	Qin (CHN)	000
		Sugimoto (JPN)	000

== Prize money ==
The sums written are per medalist. Special prizes for "the best technique" for men and women, in the sum of 5,000$, were also awarded.

Medal	Prize
Gold	25,000$
Silver	10,000$
Bronze	5,000$
5th place	2,000$
7th place	1,000$
9th place	500$
