= Judo at the 2012 Summer Olympics – Women's +78 kg =

Women's judo +78 kg category at the Games of the XXX Olympiad
- Venue: ExCeL Exhibition Centre
- Date: 3 August 2012
- Competitors: 20 from 20 nations

Medalists
1st place, gold medalist(s)		Idalys Ortiz	Cuba
2nd place, silver medalist(s)		Mika Sugimoto	Japan
3rd place, bronze medalist(s)		Karina Bryant	Great Britain
3rd place, bronze medalist(s)		Tong Wen	China

Women's +78 kg category in judo at the 2012 Olympic Games in London took place at the ExCeL Exhibition Centre between 28 July and 3 August.

The gold and silver medals were determined by a single-elimination tournament, with the winner of the final taking gold and the loser receiving silver. Judo events awarded two bronze medals. Quarter-final losers competed in a repechage match for the right to face a semi-final loser for a bronze medal (that is, the judokas defeated in quarter-finals 'A' and 'B' competed against each other, with the winner of that match facing the semi-final loser from the other half of the bracket).

Idalys Ortiz from Cuba won the gold medal, defeating Mika Sugimoto from Japan in the final. Bronze medals were awarded to both Karina Bryant from Great Britain and Tong Wen from China.

The other Saudi woman selected was Pepperdine University-based runner Sarah Attar, who competed in the women's 800 metres.

== Schedule ==
All times are British Summer Time (UTC+1)

Date	Time	Round
28 July to 3 August 2012	09:30; 14:00; 16:10	Qualifications; Semi-finals; Final

== Results ==
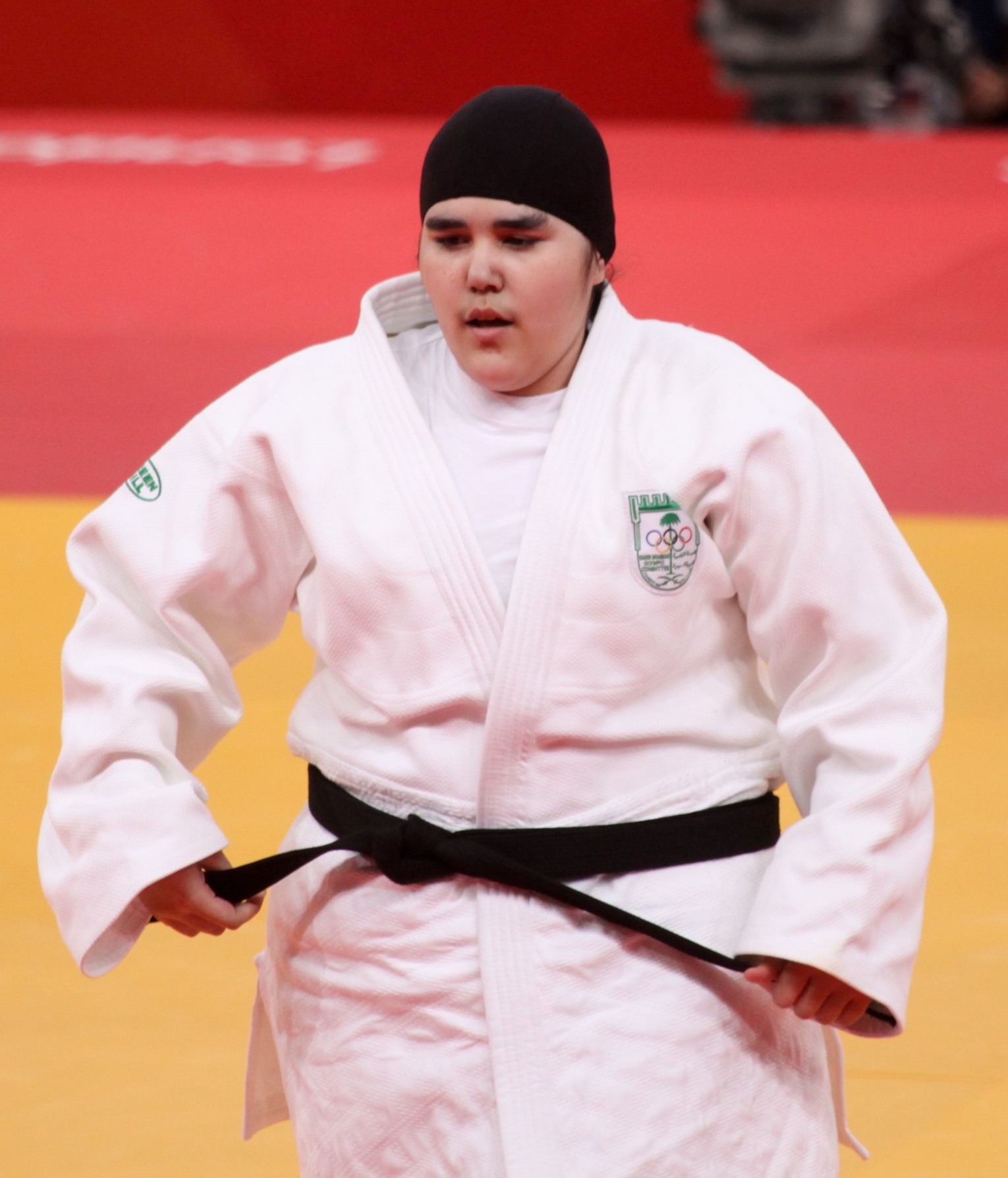
Wojdan Shaherkani, first female competitor from Saudi Arabia to compete at any Olympics in any event, contested in the +78 kg category

=== Finals ===
Semi-finals
Tong Wen (CHN)	0001
Idalys Ortiz (CUB)	0010
Mika Sugimoto (JPN)	0011
Karina Bryant (GBR)	0002

Final
Idalys Ortiz (CUB)	000
Mika Sugimoto (JPN)	0001

=== Repechages ===
Repechage		Bronze medal
Iryna Kindzerska (UKR)	0010
Elena Ivashchenko (RUS)	0002	Iryna Kindzerska (UKR)	011
		Karina Bryant (GBR)	020

Repechage		Bronze medal
Maria Suelen Altheman (BRA)	0111
Gulzhan Issanova (KAZ)	0002	Maria Suelen Altheman (BRA)	001
		Tong Wen (CHN)	100

=== Pool A ===
First round
W Tong (CHN)	100
V Zambotti (MEX)	000

Second round
W Tong (CHN)	101
U Sadkowska (POL)	000
G Kocatürk (TUR)	0002
I Kindzerska (UKR)	103

Quarter-finals
W Tong (CHN)	100
I Kindzerska (UKR)	000

=== Pool B ===
First round		Second round		Quarter-finals
		E Ivashchenko (RUS)	101
W Shaherkani (KSA)	000	M Mojica (PUR)	000
M Mojica (PUR)	100			E Ivashchenko (RUS)	0002
				I Ortiz (CUB)	0011
		I Ortiz (CUB)	103
		A Moniz (CPV)	0002

=== Pool C ===
First round		Second round		Quarter-finals
		M Sugimoto (JPN)	100
		G Blanco (VEN)	000
				M Sugimoto (JPN)	100
MS Altheman (BRA)	0101			MS Altheman (BRA)	000
A-S Mondière (FRA)	000	MS Altheman (BRA)	1001
		N Cheikh Rouhou (TUN)	0001

=== Pool D ===
First round		Second round		Quarter-finals
		L Polavder (SLO)	000
S Asselah (ALG)	0001	K Bryant (GBR)	0011
K Bryant (GBR)	100			K Bryant (GBR)	0102
				G Issanova (KAZ)	0011
		N-y Kim (KOR)	0012
		G Issanova (KAZ)	0012+
