= Judo at the 2016 Summer Paralympics – Men's +100 kg =

Judo competition

Judo – Men's +100 kg at the XV Paralympic Games
- Venue: Carioca Arena 3
- Date: 10 September 2016
- Competitors: 11 from 11 nations

Medalists
1st place, gold medalist(s)		Adiljan Tulendibaev	Uzbekistan
2nd place, silver medalist(s)		Wilians Araujo	Brazil
3rd place, bronze medalist(s)		Yangaliny Jimenez Dominiguez	Cuba
3rd place, bronze medalist(s)		Kento Masaki	Japan

The men's +100 kg judo competition at the 2016 Summer Paralympics was held on 10 September at Carioca Arena 3.

== Results ==
Round of 16
William Vladimir Montero Lopez (VEN)	000
Hamzeh Nadri (IRI)	101
Adiljan Tulendibaev (UZB)	101
Ben Goodrich (USA)	000
Dursun Hayran (TUR)	000
Kento Masaki (JPN)	100

Quarterfinals
Wilians Araujo (BRA)	100
Garrah Albdoor (IRQ)	000
Yangaliny Jimenez Dominiguez (CUB)	000
Hamzeh Nadri (IRI)	000^{1}
Ilham Zakiyev (AZE)	000
Adiljan Tulendibaev (UZB)	100
Jack Hodgson (GBR)	000
Kento Masaki (JPN)	101

Semifinals
Wilians Araujo (BRA)	100
Yangaliny Jimenez Dominiguez (CUB)	000
Adiljan Tulendibaev (UZB)	100
Kento Masaki (JPN)	000

Final
Wilians Araujo (BRA)	000
Adiljan Tulendibaev (UZB)	100

=== Repechage ===
Repechage Round 1
Ben Goodrich (USA)	000
Ilham Zakiyev (AZE)	102
Dursun Hayran (TUR)	000
Jack Hodgson (GBR)	100

Repechage Finals
Garrah Albdoor (IRQ)	000
Hamzeh Nadri (IRI)	100
Ilham Zakiyev (AZE)	001
Jack Hodgson (GBR)	000

Bronze Medal Matches
Hamzeh Nadri (IRI)	000
Kento Masaki (JPN)	100
Ilham Zakiyev (AZE)	000
Yangaliny Jimenez Dominiguez (CUB)	001
