= Seigo Saito =

Japanese judoka (born 1977)

Medal record

Representing Japan

Men's Judo

Asian Championships
Gold medal – first place	2005 Tashkent	-90 kg

Seigo Saito (齋藤 制剛, Saitō Seigō, born 4 May 1977) is a retired Japanese judoka.

Saito is from Sapporo, Hokkaidō. He belonged to Asahi Kasei after graduation from Kokushikan University in 2000.

Saito was good at Uchimata and Newaza in high-school days and was expected to get medal of Olympic Games or World Championships in the future. But he was not able to use the skill of them by the trouble of knee like Anterior cruciate ligament injury since 2000.

In 2005, he won a gold medal at the Asian Championships and All-Japan Selected Championships with the skill that he learned newly like Kata guruma, Ōuchi gari and Kuchiki taoshi. But he was not chosen as a Japanese representative at the World Championships held in Cairo.

He has coached judo at Asahi Kasei since 2010. Among his students is Tatsuki Masubuchi Yohei Takai and so on.

His younger brother, Masamichi (順道) is also famous judoka and won a gold medal at the Kodokan Cup in 2001.

== Achievements ==
- 1994 - All-Japan Junior Championships (-86 kg) 2nd

- Inter-highschool championships (-86 kg) 3rd

- 1995 - Kodokan Cup (-86 kg) 2nd

- Inter-highschool championships (-86 kg) 1st

- 1996 - Jigoro Kano Cup (-86 kg) 3rd

- All-Japan Selected Championships (-86 kg) 3rd
- All-Japan Junior Championships (-86 kg) 1st

- 1997 - Kodokan Cup (-90 kg) 2nd

- All-Japan Junior Championships (-86 kg) 1st
- All-Japan University Championships (-86 kg) 3rd

- 1998 - All-Japan University Championships (-90 kg) 3rd
- 1999 - Kodokan Cup (-90 kg) 3rd

- All-Japan University Championships (-90 kg) 2nd

- 2000 - All-Japan Businessgroup Championships (-90 kg) 2nd
- 2001 - All-Japan Selected Championships (-90 kg) 2nd

- Kodokan Cup (-90 kg) 1st

- 2002 - All-Japan Selected Championships (-90 kg) 3rd

- All-Japan Businessgroup Championships (-90 kg) 1st

- 2003 - Kodokan Cup (-90 kg) 2nd

- All-Japan Businessgroup Championships (-90 kg) 1st

- 2004 - Kodokan Cup (-90 kg) 1st

- All-Japan Businessgroup Championships (-90 kg) 1st

- 2005 - Asian Championships (-90 kg) 1st

- All-Japan Selected Championships (-90 kg) 2nd
- Kodokan Cup (-90 kg) 1st

- 2006 - All-Japan Selected Championships (-90 kg) 1st

- Kodokan Cup (-90 kg) 1st

- 2007 - Jigoro Kano (-90 kg) 3rd

- All-Japan Selected Championships (-90 kg) 2nd
- Kodokan Cup (-90 kg) 1st

- 2008 - All-Japan Businessgroup Championships (-90 kg) 2nd
- 2009 - All-Japan Businessgroup Championships (-90 kg) 2nd
