= Judo at the 2010 Asian Games – Women's +78 kg =

Judo competition

Women's +78 kg at the 2010 Asian Games
- Venue: Huagong Gymnasium
- Date: 13 November 2010
- Competitors: 8 from 8 nations

Medalists
gold medal	Mika Sugimoto	Japan
silver medal	Qin Qian	China
bronze medal	Kim Na-young	South Korea
bronze medal	Gulzhan Issanova	Kazakhstan

The women's +78 kilograms (heavyweight) competition at the 2010 Asian Games in Guangzhou was held on 13 November at the Huagong Gymnasium.

== Schedule ==
All times are China Standard Time (UTC+08:00)

Date	Time	Event
Saturday, 13 November 2010	10:00	Quarterfinals
Saturday, 13 November 2010	15:00	Final of repechage
Saturday, 13 November 2010	15:00	Final of table
Saturday, 13 November 2010	15:00	Finals

== Results ==
Legend

- WO — Won by walkover

=== Main bracket ===
Quarterfinals		Final of table		Gold medal
Qin Qian (CHN)	WO
Sarah Al-Salem (IOC)		Qin Qian (CHN)	100
Gulzhan Issanova (KAZ)	001	Gulzhan Issanova (KAZ)	000
Dorjgotovyn Tserenkhand (MGL)	000			Qin Qian (CHN)	000
Mika Sugimoto (JPN)	020			Mika Sugimoto (JPN)	000
Thonthan Bunduang (THA)	000	Mika Sugimoto (JPN)	002
Kim Na-young (KOR)	021	Kim Na-young (KOR)	001
Huang Tzu-chin (TPE)	000

=== Repechage ===
Final of repechage
Bye
Dorjgotovyn Tserenkhand (MGL)
Thonthan Bunduang (THA)	000
Huang Tzu-chin (TPE)	010

Bronze medals
Dorjgotovyn Tserenkhand (MGL)	000
Kim Na-young (KOR)	001
Huang Tzu-chin (TPE)	000
Gulzhan Issanova (KAZ)	100
