= Egusa =

Egusa (江草 or 江種) is a Japanese surname. Notable people with the surname include:

- Hirotaka Egusa (江草 仁貴, born 1980), Japanese baseball player
- Tatsuaki Egusa (江種 辰明, born 1976), Japanese judoka
