= Sam Rajabi =

Personal information
- Born: 21 March 1985 (age 41)
- Occupation: Judoka

Sport
- Country: Iran
- Sport: Judo
- Weight class: +100 kg

Achievements and titles
- Asian Champ.: (bronze) (2009)
Medal record
Men's judo
Representing Iran
Asian Championships
Bronze medal – third place	2009 Taipei	+100 kg

Profile at external databases
- IJF: 2898
- JudoInside.com: 42941

Sam Rajabi (born 21 March 1985) is an Iranian former judoka. He competed in 2007 World Judo Championships for Iran and also won the bronze medal in the heavyweight (+100 kg) division at the 2009 Asian Judo Championships. Rajabi also has competed in jiu-jitsu world championships and won a gold medal in 2020. He moved to the United States in 2011.

== Human right activities ==
On 28 December 2019, Ehsan Rajabi went on podium to receive his gold medal at the World Jiu-Jitsu Championships in Orlando, US, holding a shirt with Navid Afkari's picture on it. He was a member of the "Unity for Navid" campaign and wrote on his Twitter page:

"Today I fought for Navid as a member of the campaign #Unity_for_Navid and became the champion of the world. The path of Navid continues. Promises [Navids] sprout and grow until the day of freedom. We athletes will continue in his footsteps."
