= Shao Ning =

Chinese judoka (born 1982)

Medal record

Representing China

Men's Judo

Asian Championships
Bronze medal – third place	2009 Taipei	-100 kg

East Asian Games
Bronze medal – third place	2009 Hong Kong	-100 kg

Shao Ning (Chinese: 邵寧; born 1982-02-17 in Shandong) is a male Chinese judoka who competed at the 2008 Summer Olympics in the Half heavyweight (90–100 kg) event.

== Major performances ==
- 2007 Birmingham World Cup - 5th -90 kg class

== See also ==
- China at the 2008 Summer Olympics
