= Kim Soo-whan =

South Korean judoka (born 1988)

Personal information
- Born: 8 June 1988 (age 38) Mokpo, South Jeolla Province, South Korea
- Occupation: Judoka

Sport
- Country: South Korea
- Sport: Judo
- Weight class: +100 kg

Achievements and titles
- World Champ.: R16 (2009, 2013)
- Asian Champ.: (gold) (2009, 2009, 2010)
Medal record
Men's judo
Representing South Korea
Asian Games
Gold medal – first place	2010 Guangzhou	+100 kg
Asian Championships
Gold medal – first place	2009 Taipei	+100 kg
Gold medal – first place	2009 Taipei	Open
IJF Grand Slam
Gold medal – first place	2011 Moscow	+100 kg
Bronze medal – third place	2010 Moscow	+100 kg
IJF Grand Prix
Gold medal – first place	2013 Miami	+100 kg
Gold medal – first place	2013 Ulaanbaatar	+100 kg
Silver medal – second place	2013 Jeju	+100 kg
Asian Junior Championships
Bronze medal – third place	2007 Hyderabad	+100 kg
Summer Universiade
Gold medal – first place	2011 Shenzhen	+100 kg

Profile at external databases
- IJF: 63
- JudoInside.com: 48448
- Updated on 26 December 2022

Kim Soo-whan (Korean: 김수완; born 8 June 1988) is a South Korean judoka who competed in the heavyweight (+100 kg) and open categories. He won gold in both categories at the 2009 Asian Judo Championships , the 2010 Asian Games, the 2011 Moscow Grand Slam, and the 2011 Summer Universiade.

== Early life ==
Kim was born in Mokpo, South Jeolla Province. He attended Yongin University , where he was a student when he claimed the 2010 Asian Games title.

== Career ==
Kim in the +100 kg final at the 2009 Asian Judo Championships in Taipei, had won against the 2004 Olympic and two-time world champion Keiji Suzuki, after an injury break from a knee injury. He won the +100 kg Asian Games gold medal in his first Games at the 2010 Asian Games at Guangzhou, beating Uzbekistan's Abdullo Tangriev by ippon with 56 seconds remaining, having previously scored ippons against Wang Haohao and Mohammad Reza Rodaki in the first and second rounds respectively, as well as against Daiki Kamikawa in the semifinal.

In May 2011,At the Moscow Grand Slam +100 kg competing for Namyangju City Hall, he secured the title defeating Dmitriy Sterkhov of Russia with ippon in the final, before defeating Andreas Tölzer by ippon and Abdullo Tangriev with hansoku-make. He also won the +100 kg title at the Shenzhen Universiade. In 2013 he won the Miami and Ulaanbaatar Grand Prix and took silver at the Jeju Grand Prix.
