= 2010 Judo World Masters =

Judo competition

Judo 2010 Judo World Masters
- Venue: Suwon
- Location: Suwon, South Korea
- Dates: 16–17 January 2010
- Competitors: 168 from 33 nations

Competition at external databases
- Links: IJF • JudoInside

The 2010 Judo World Masters World Masters was held in Suwon, South Korea, from 16 to 17 January 2010.

== Medal summary ==
=== Medal table ===
* Host nation (South Korea)

Rank	Nation	Gold	Silver	Bronze	Total
1	Japan (JPN)	6	5	10	21
2	South Korea (KOR)*	3	4	2	9
3	France (FRA)	2	2	3	7
4	Uzbekistan (UZB)	1	0	2	3
5	China (CHN)	1	0	0	1
5	Mongolia (MGL)	1	0	0	1
7	Russia (RUS)	0	2	4	6
8	Spain (ESP)	0	1	0	1
9	Hungary (HUN)	0	0	2	2
10	Georgia (GEO)	0	0	1	1
10	Israel (ISR)	0	0	1	1
10	Kazakhstan (KAZ)	0	0	1	1
10	Netherlands (NED)	0	0	1	1
10	Poland (POL)	0	0	1	1
Totals (14 entries)		14	14	28	56

=== Men's events ===
Event	Gold	Silver	Bronze
Extra-lightweight (-60 kg)	Rishod Sobirov; Uzbekistan	Hiroaki Hiraoka; Japan	Choi Gwang-hyeon; South Korea
Extra-lightweight (-60 kg)	Rishod Sobirov; Uzbekistan	Hiroaki Hiraoka; Japan	Arsen Galstyan; Russia
Half-lightweight (-66 kg)	Sanjaasürengiin Miyaaragchaa; Mongolia	Alim Gadanov; Russia	David Larose; France
Half-lightweight (-66 kg)	Sanjaasürengiin Miyaaragchaa; Mongolia	Alim Gadanov; Russia	Musa Mogushkov; Russia
Lightweight (-73 kg)	Bang Gui-man; South Korea	Gilles Bonhomme; France	Yasuhiro Awano; Japan
Lightweight (-73 kg)	Bang Gui-man; South Korea	Gilles Bonhomme; France	Mansur Isaev; Russia
Half-middleweight (-81 kg)	Kim Jae-bum; South Korea	Axel Clerget; France	Shokir Muminov; Uzbekistan
Half-middleweight (-81 kg)	Kim Jae-bum; South Korea	Axel Clerget; France	Sirazhudin Magomedov; Russia
Middleweight (-90 kg)	Takashi Ono; Japan	Kirill Denisov; Russia	Lee Kyu-won; South Korea
Middleweight (-90 kg)	Takashi Ono; Japan	Kirill Denisov; Russia	Dilshod Choriev; Uzbekistan
Half-heavyweight (-100 kg)	Takamasa Anai; Japan	Hwang Hee-tae; South Korea	Maxim Rakov; Kazakhstan
Half-heavyweight (-100 kg)	Takamasa Anai; Japan	Hwang Hee-tae; South Korea	Levan Zhorzholiani; Georgia
Heavyweight (+100 kg)	Teddy Riner; France	Keiji Suzuki; Japan	Kazuhiko Takahashi; Japan
Heavyweight (+100 kg)	Teddy Riner; France	Keiji Suzuki; Japan	Grim Vuijsters; Netherlands

=== Women's events ===
Event	Gold	Silver	Bronze
Extra-lightweight (-48 kg)	Haruna Asami; Japan	Kaori Kondo; Japan	Tomoko Fukumi; Japan
Extra-lightweight (-48 kg)	Haruna Asami; Japan	Kaori Kondo; Japan	Shoko Ibe; Japan
Half-lightweight (-52 kg)	Misato Nakamura; Japan	Laura Gómez; Spain	Pénélope Bonna; France
Half-lightweight (-52 kg)	Misato Nakamura; Japan	Laura Gómez; Spain	Yuka Nishida; Japan
Lightweight (-57 kg)	Kaori Matsumoto; Japan	Nae Udaka; Japan	Hitomi Tokuhisa; Japan
Lightweight (-57 kg)	Kaori Matsumoto; Japan	Nae Udaka; Japan	Hedvig Karakas; Hungary
Half-middleweight (-63 kg)	Yoshie Ueno; Japan	Kong Ja-young; South Korea	Alice Schlesinger; Israel
Half-middleweight (-63 kg)	Yoshie Ueno; Japan	Kong Ja-young; South Korea	Miki Tanaka; Japan
Middleweight (-70 kg)	Hwang Ye-sul; South Korea	Yoriko Kunihara; Japan	Lucie Décosse; France
Middleweight (-70 kg)	Hwang Ye-sul; South Korea	Yoriko Kunihara; Japan	Anett Mészáros; Hungary
Half-heavyweight (-78 kg)	Céline Lebrun; France	Jeong Gyeong-mi; South Korea	Sayaka Anai; Japan
Half-heavyweight (-78 kg)	Céline Lebrun; France	Jeong Gyeong-mi; South Korea	Tomomi Okamura; Japan
Heavyweight (+78 kg)	Qin Qian; China	Kim Na-young; South Korea	Urszula Sadkowska; Poland
Heavyweight (+78 kg)	Qin Qian; China	Kim Na-young; South Korea	Megumi Tachimoto; Japan
