= 2008 Asian Judo Championships =

Judo competition

The 2008 Asian Judo Championships were held in Jeju City, South Korea from 26 April to 27 April 2008.

== Medal summary ==
=== Men ===
Event	Gold	Silver	Bronze
Extra lightweight −60 kg	Hiroaki Hiraoka; Japan	Masoud Haji Akhondzadeh; Iran	Salamat Utarbayev; Kazakhstan
Extra lightweight −60 kg	Hiroaki Hiraoka; Japan	Masoud Haji Akhondzadeh; Iran	Kim Kyong-jin; North Korea
Half lightweight −66 kg	Arash Miresmaeili; Iran	Khashbaataryn Tsagaanbaatar; Mongolia	Kim Joo-jin; South Korea
Half lightweight −66 kg	Arash Miresmaeili; Iran	Khashbaataryn Tsagaanbaatar; Mongolia	Mirali Sharipov; Uzbekistan
Lightweight −73 kg	Ali Maloumat; Iran	Rinat Ibragimov; Kazakhstan	Masahiko Otsuka; Japan
Lightweight −73 kg	Ali Maloumat; Iran	Rinat Ibragimov; Kazakhstan	Gantömöriin Dashdavaa; Mongolia
Half middleweight −81 kg	Kim Jae-bum; South Korea	Hamed Malekmohammadi; Iran	Erdenebilegiin Enkhbat; Mongolia
Half middleweight −81 kg	Kim Jae-bum; South Korea	Hamed Malekmohammadi; Iran	Takashi Ono; Japan
Middleweight −90 kg	Hiroshi Izumi; Japan	Khurshid Nabiev; Uzbekistan	Choi Sun-ho; South Korea
Middleweight −90 kg	Hiroshi Izumi; Japan	Khurshid Nabiev; Uzbekistan	Hossein Ghomi; Iran
Half heavyweight −100 kg	Askhat Zhitkeyev; Kazakhstan	Jang Sung-ho; South Korea	Naidangiin Tüvshinbayar; Mongolia
Half heavyweight −100 kg	Askhat Zhitkeyev; Kazakhstan	Jang Sung-ho; South Korea	Utkir Kurbanov; Uzbekistan
Heavyweight +100 kg	Abdullo Tangriev; Uzbekistan	Mohammad Reza Roudaki; Iran	Kim Sung-bum; South Korea
Heavyweight +100 kg	Abdullo Tangriev; Uzbekistan	Mohammad Reza Roudaki; Iran	Shinya Katabuchi; Japan
Openweight	Kim Sung-min; South Korea	Mahmoud Miran; Iran	Hiroki Tachiyama; Japan
Openweight	Kim Sung-min; South Korea	Mahmoud Miran; Iran	Rudy Hachache; Lebanon

=== Women ===
Event	Gold	Silver	Bronze
Extra lightweight −48 kg	Emi Yamagishi; Japan	Pak Ok-song; North Korea	Xiao Jun; China
Extra lightweight −48 kg	Emi Yamagishi; Japan	Pak Ok-song; North Korea	Chung Jung-yeon; South Korea
Half lightweight −52 kg	Pak Myong-hui; North Korea	Mönkhbaataryn Bundmaa; Mongolia	Sholpan Kaliyeva; Kazakhstan
Half lightweight −52 kg	Pak Myong-hui; North Korea	Mönkhbaataryn Bundmaa; Mongolia	Shih Pei-chun; Chinese Taipei
Lightweight −57 kg	Kaori Matsumoto; Japan	Kang Sin-young; South Korea	Khishigbatyn Erdenet-Od; Mongolia
Lightweight −57 kg	Kaori Matsumoto; Japan	Kang Sin-young; South Korea	Choe Kyong-sil; North Korea
Half middleweight −63 kg	Rina Kozawa; Japan	Kong Ja-young; South Korea	Won Ok-im; North Korea
Half middleweight −63 kg	Rina Kozawa; Japan	Kong Ja-young; South Korea	Tümen-Odyn Battögs; Mongolia
Middleweight −70 kg	Masae Ueno; Japan	Park Ka-yeon; South Korea	Zhanar Zhanzunova; Kazakhstan
Middleweight −70 kg	Masae Ueno; Japan	Park Ka-yeon; South Korea	Wang Haixia; China
Half heavyweight −78 kg	Pan Yuqing; China	Jeong Gyeong-mi; South Korea	Sayaka Anai; Japan
Half heavyweight −78 kg	Pan Yuqing; China	Jeong Gyeong-mi; South Korea	Pürevjargalyn Lkhamdegd; Mongolia
Heavyweight +78 kg	Mai Tateyama; Japan	Mariya Shekerova; Uzbekistan	Gulzhan Issanova; Kazakhstan
Heavyweight +78 kg	Mai Tateyama; Japan	Mariya Shekerova; Uzbekistan	Dorjgotovyn Tserenkhand; Mongolia
Openweight	Mika Sugimoto; Japan	Jo Hye-jin; South Korea	Mariya Shekerova; Uzbekistan
Openweight	Mika Sugimoto; Japan	Jo Hye-jin; South Korea	Dorjgotovyn Tserenkhand; Mongolia

== Medal table ==
Rank	Nation	Gold	Silver	Bronze	Total
1	Japan	8	0	5	13
2	South Korea	2	6	4	12
3	Iran	2	4	1	7
4	Uzbekistan	1	2	3	6
5	Kazakhstan	1	1	4	6
6	North Korea	1	1	3	5
7	China	1	0	2	3
8	Mongolia	0	2	8	10
9	Chinese Taipei	0	0	1	1
9	Lebanon	0	0	1	1
Totals (10 entries)		16	16	32	64
