= Judo at the 2010 Asian Games – Men's +100 kg =

Judo competition

Men's +100 kg at the 2010 Asian Games
- Venue: Huagong Gymnasium
- Date: 13 November 2010
- Competitors: 14 from 14 nations

Medalists
| gold medal | Kim Soo-whan | South Korea |
| silver medal | Abdullo Tangriev | Uzbekistan |
| bronze medal | Daiki Kamikawa | Japan |
| bronze medal | Mohammad Reza Roudaki | Iran |

The men's +100 kilograms (heavyweight) competition at the 2010 Asian Games in Guangzhou was held on 13 November at the Huagong Gymnasium.

Kim Soo-whan of South Korea won the gold medal.

== Schedule ==
All times are China Standard Time (UTC+08:00)

| Date | Time | Event |
|---|---|---|
| Saturday, 13 November 2010 | 10:00 | Preliminary |
| Saturday, 13 November 2010 | 10:00 | Quarterfinals |
| Saturday, 13 November 2010 | 15:00 | Final of repechage |
| Saturday, 13 November 2010 | 15:00 | Final of table |
| Saturday, 13 November 2010 | 15:00 | Finals |

== Results ==
=== Main bracket ===
Preliminary
Abdullo Tangriev (UZB) | 021
Rashed Zaidan (KSA) | 000
Shavkat Igbolov (TJK) | 100
Rajan Joshi (NEP) | 000
Yerzhan Shynkeyev (KAZ) | 001
Hudaýberdi Sahatow (TKM) | 000
Kim Soo-whan (KOR) | 100
Wang Hao (CHN) | 000
Boldpüreviin Sugarjargal (MGL) | 000
Mohammad Reza Roudaki (IRI) | 100
Daiki Kamikawa (JPN) | 100
Zahid Iqbal (PAK) | 000

Quarterfinals
Abdullo Tangriev (UZB) | 101
Shavkat Igbolov (TJK) | 000
Yerzhan Shynkeyev (KAZ) | 101
Tomohiko Hoshina (PHI) | 000
Kim Soo-whan (KOR) | 111
Mohammad Reza Roudaki (IRI) | 000
Daiki Kamikawa (JPN) | 100
Iurii Krakovetskii (KGZ) | 000

Final of table
Abdullo Tangriev (UZB) | 101
Yerzhan Shynkeyev (KAZ) | 000
Kim Soo-whan (KOR) | 001
Daiki Kamikawa (JPN) | 000

Gold medal
Abdullo Tangriev (UZB) | 000
Kim Soo-whan (KOR) | 100

=== Repechage ===
Final of repechage
Shavkat Igbolov (TJK) | 011
Tomohiko Hoshina (PHI) | 010
Mohammad Reza Roudaki (IRI) | 111
Iurii Krakovetskii (KGZ) | 000

Bronze medals
Shavkat Igbolov (TJK) | 000
Daiki Kamikawa (JPN) | 100
Mohammad Reza Roudaki (IRI) | 100
Yerzhan Shynkeyev (KAZ) | 000
