= Adiljan Tulendibaev =

Uzbekistani judoka (born 1985)

Personal information
- Born: 11 April 1985 (age 41)
- Occupation: Judoka

Sport
- Country: Uzbekistan
- Sport: Judo, Para judo
- Weight class: +100 kg

Achievements and titles
- Paralympic Games: (gold) (2016)
- World Champ.: R32 (2008)
- Asian Champ.: (bronze) (2009)
Medal record
Men's judo
Representing Uzbekistan
Asian Championships
Bronze medal – third place	2009 Taipei	Open
IJF Grand Prix
Bronze medal – third place	2012 Abu Dhabi	+100 kg
World Juniors Championships
Bronze medal – third place	2004 Budapest	+100 kg
Asian Junior Championships
Bronze medal – third place	2003 Macau	+100 kg
Bronze medal – third place	2004 Doha	+100 kg
Men's para judo
Paralympic Games
Gold medal – first place	2016 Rio de Janeiro	+100 kg
Asian Para Games
Gold medal – first place	2014 Incheon	+100 kg

Profile at external databases
- IJF: 2202
- JudoInside.com: 43537
- Updated on 30 April 2025

Adiljan Tulendibaev (born 11 April 1985) is an Uzbekistani judoka.

Tulendibaev finished in joint fifth place in the open weight class division at the 2006 Asian Games, having lost to Askhat Zhitkeyev of Kazakhstan in the bronze medal match.

Tulendibaev resides in the Tashkent region.
