= Kento Masaki =

Japanese Paralympic judoka

Personal information
- Nationality: Japan
- Born: 9 August 1987 (age 38) Minamiawaji, Hyogo, Japan
Medal record
Men's judo
Representing Japan
Paralympic Games
Gold medal – first place	2012 London	+100kg
Bronze medal – third place	2016 Rio de Janeiro	+100kg
Asian Para Games
Bronze medal – third place	2014 Incheon	+100 kg

Kento Masaki (正木 健人, Masaki Kento; born 9 August 1987) is a Japanese Paralympic judoka in Super-Heavyweight.

In 2012 he became Paralympic champion in the +100 kg by beating Song Wang (China) in the final.

The 2016 Summer Paralympics in Rio was Masaki's second appearance at the Games. Competing in the +100 kg category, he secured his second Paralympic medal with a bronze However, he faced a setback in the semi-final when he had his first-ever defeat in a Paralympic match to Adiljan Tulendibaev of Uzbekistan. Tulendibaev went on to win the gold medal, while Masaki ultimately won the bronze-medal match.
