= Urszula Sadkowska =

Polish judoka

Personal information
- Born: 6 February 1984 (age 42) Olsztyn, Poland
- Occupation: Judoka
- Height: 193 cm (6 ft 4 in)
- Weight: 145 kg (320 lb)

Sport
- Country: Poland
- Sport: Judo
- Weight class: +78 kg

Achievements and titles
- Olympic Games: R16 (2012)
- World Champ.: 7th (2007, 2010)
- European Champ.: (silver) (2009)
Medal record
Women's judo
Representing Poland
European Championships
Silver medal – second place	2009 Tbilisi	+78 kg
Bronze medal – third place	2010 Vienna	+78 kg
World Masters
Bronze medal – third place	2010 Suwon	+78 kg
IJF Grand Slam
Bronze medal – third place	2009 Moscow	+78 kg
Bronze medal – third place	2010 Rio de Janeiro	+78 kg
Bronze medal – third place	2010 Moscow	+78 kg
IJF Grand Prix
Bronze medal – third place	2010 Tunis	+78 kg
European U23 Championships
Gold medal – first place	2005 Kyiv	+78 kg
Bronze medal – third place	2004 Ljubljana	+78 kg
European Junior Championships
Silver medal – second place	2003 Sarajevo	+78 kg
European Cadet Championships
Silver medal – second place	2000 Oradea	+70 kg

Profile at external databases
- IJF: 773
- JudoInside.com: 12613
- Updated on 15 November 2022

Urszula Sadkowska (born 6 February 1984) is a Polish judoka. She is 6 ft 4 in (193 cm) tall. Polish judoka Urszula Sadkowska was 2005 European U23 Champion. Silver at the 2009 European Championships in Tbilisi and bronze in 2010 in Vienna. The heavyweight won the World Cup in Prague and Tallinn in 2007 and Madrid in 2009. In 2003 she won silver at the European Junior Championships

Sadkowska also competed in the women's +78 kg events at the 2008 Summer Olympics and 2012 Summer Olympics.

== Achievements ==
Year	Tournament	Place	Weight class
2012	European Championships	7th	Heavyweight (+78 kg)
2011	European Championships	7th	Heavyweight (+78 kg)
2010	World Championships	7th	Heavyweight (+78 kg)
2010	European Championships	3rd	Heavyweight (+78 kg)
2009	European Championships	2nd	Heavyweight (+78 kg)
2007	World Championships	7th	Heavyweight (+78 kg)
2007	European Championships	5th	Heavyweight (+78 kg)
2004	European Open Championships	5th	Open class
