= He Xiaoli =

Chinese former professional judoka

Personal information
- Native name: 何晓梨
- Nickname: Judo Mama
- Nationality: China
- Born: 1982 (age 43–44) Donggang, Liaoning
- Education: Liaoning Vocational and Technical College of Sports
- Occupation(s): Former professional judoka Judo coach

Sport
- Sport: Judo
- Weight class: -63kg
Medal record
Gold medal – first place	2004 China National Women's	-63kg
Silver medal – second place	2005 Asian Judo Championships	-63kg

Profile at external databases
- JudoInside.com: 38689

He Xiaoli (Chinese: 何晓梨; pinyin: Hé Xiǎolí, born 1982) is a former female professional judoka from China, and member of the Changshou District Committee of the CPPCC. Her weight class is -63 kg.

== Biography ==
In 1997, she entered the Liaoning Vocational and Technical College of Sports, where she learned to become a professional judoka.

== Medals ==
Year	Championship	Results	Weight class
2004	China National Women's Championship	Gold	-63 kg
2005	2005 Asian Judo Championships	Silver	-63 kg
