= Judo at the 2006 Asian Games – Women's openweight =

Judo competition

Women's openweight at the 2006 Asian Games
- Venue: Qatar SC Indoor Hall
- Date: 5 December 2006
- Competitors: 9 from 9 nations

Medalists
gold medal	Liu Huanyuan	China
silver medal	Dorjgotovyn Tserenkhand	Mongolia
bronze medal	Mai Tateyama	Japan
bronze medal	Gulzhan Issanova	Kazakhstan

The women's openweight judo competition at the 2006 Asian Games in Doha, Qatar was held on 5 December 2006 at the Qatar SC Indoor Hall with nine competitors.

Liu Huanyuan of China won the gold medal.

== Schedule ==
All times are Arabia Standard Time (UTC+03:00)

Date	Time	Event
Tuesday, 5 December 2006	14:00	Round of 16
Tuesday, 5 December 2006	14:00	Quarterfinals
Tuesday, 5 December 2006	14:00	Repechage final
Tuesday, 5 December 2006	14:00	Semifinals
Tuesday, 5 December 2006	14:00	Finals

== Results ==
=== Main bracket ===
Round of 16
Angom Anita Chanu (IND)	1100
Elena Mogilinay (UZB)	0000

Quarterfinals
Liu Huanyuan (CHN)	1010
Lee Hyun-kyung (KOR)	0000
Gulzhan Issanova (KAZ)	1001
Ola Diyab (SYR)	0000
Dorjgotovyn Tserenkhand (MGL)	1121
Angom Anita Chanu (IND)	0000
Mai Tateyama (JPN)	1001
Rawdha Masoud (QAT)	0000

Semifinals
Liu Huanyuan (CHN)	1000
Gulzhan Issanova (KAZ)	0000
Dorjgotovyn Tserenkhand (MGL)	0210
Mai Tateyama (JPN)	0000

Gold medal contest
Liu Huanyuan (CHN)	1001
Dorjgotovyn Tserenkhand (MGL)	0000

=== Repechage ===
Repechage final
Lee Hyun-kyung (KOR)	1000
Ola Diyab (SYR)	0000
Angom Anita Chanu (IND)	1001
Rawdha Masoud (QAT)	0000

Bronze medal contest
Lee Hyun-kyung (KOR)	0001
Mai Tateyama (JPN)	0201
Angom Anita Chanu (IND)	0000
Gulzhan Issanova (KAZ)	1000
