= Midori Shintani =

Japanese judoka (born 1980)

Personal information
- Born: 15 August 1980 (age 46)
- Occupation: Judoka

Sport
- Country: Japan
- Sport: Judo
- Weight class: +78 kg, Open

Achievements and titles
- World Champ.: (gold) (2005)
- Asian Champ.: (gold) (2001, 2001, 2007)
Medal record
Women's judo
Representing Japan
World Championships
Gold medal – first place	2005 Cairo	Open
Silver medal – second place	2001 Munich	+78 kg
Asian Games
Bronze medal – third place	2006 Doha	+78 kg
Asian Championships
Gold medal – first place	2001 Ulaanbaatar	Open
Gold medal – first place	2001 Ulaanbaatar	+78 kg
Gold medal – first place	2007 Kuwait City	+78 kg
Bronze medal – third place	2000 Osaka	Open
Summer Universiade
Gold medal – first place	2001 Beijing	Open
Bronze medal – third place	1999 Palma de Mallorca	+78 kg

Profile at external databases
- IJF: 2208
- JudoInside.com: 2959
- Updated on 19 November 2022

Midori Shintani (薪谷 翠, Shintani Midori; born 15 August 1980 in Kinokawa, Wakayama) is a female Japanese judoka. Shintani won a gold medal at the women's open category of the 2005 World Judo Championships in Cairo.

Shintani won a silver medal at the +78 kg category of the 2001 World Judo Championships in Munich. She won a bronze medal at the +78 kg category of the 2006 Asian Games.
