= 2005 Asian Judo Championships =

Judo competition

The 2005 Asian Judo Championships were held in Tashkent, Uzbekistan from 14 May to 15 May 2005.

== Medal summary ==
=== Men ===
Event	Gold	Silver	Bronze
Extra lightweight −60 kg	Cho Nam-suk; South Korea	Tatsuaki Egusa; Japan	Lin Chueh-chen; Chinese Taipei
Extra lightweight −60 kg	Cho Nam-suk; South Korea	Tatsuaki Egusa; Japan	Salamat Utarbayev; Kazakhstan
Half lightweight −66 kg	Khashbaataryn Tsagaanbaatar; Mongolia	Arash Miresmaeili; Iran	Toshiaki Umetsu; Japan
Half lightweight −66 kg	Khashbaataryn Tsagaanbaatar; Mongolia	Arash Miresmaeili; Iran	Bang Gui-man; South Korea
Lightweight −73 kg	Kim Jae-bum; South Korea	Aidar Kabimollayev; Kazakhstan	Rasul Boqiev; Tajikistan
Lightweight −73 kg	Kim Jae-bum; South Korea	Aidar Kabimollayev; Kazakhstan	Yusuke Kanamaru; Japan
Half middleweight −81 kg	Takashi Ono; Japan	Kim Soo-kyung; South Korea	Laziz Yuldashev; Uzbekistan
Half middleweight −81 kg	Takashi Ono; Japan	Kim Soo-kyung; South Korea	Rauf Hukmatov; Tajikistan
Middleweight −90 kg	Seigo Saito; Japan	Batbayaryn Ariun-Erdene; Mongolia	Parviz Sobirov; Tajikistan
Middleweight −90 kg	Seigo Saito; Japan	Batbayaryn Ariun-Erdene; Mongolia	Ghanam Al-Dikan; Kuwait
Half heavyweight −100 kg	Jang Sung-ho; South Korea	Askhat Zhitkeyev; Kazakhstan	Badarchiin Myagmardorj; Mongolia
Half heavyweight −100 kg	Jang Sung-ho; South Korea	Askhat Zhitkeyev; Kazakhstan	Takamasa Anai; Japan
Heavyweight +100 kg	Mohammad Reza Roudaki; Iran	Hidekazu Shoda; Japan	Utkur Salyamov; Uzbekistan
Heavyweight +100 kg	Mohammad Reza Roudaki; Iran	Hidekazu Shoda; Japan	Yeldos Ikhsangaliyev; Kazakhstan
Openweight	Abdullo Tangriev; Uzbekistan	Hiroaki Takahashi; Japan	Mahmoud Miran; Iran
Openweight	Abdullo Tangriev; Uzbekistan	Hiroaki Takahashi; Japan	Vyacheslav Berduta; Kazakhstan

=== Women ===
Event	Gold	Silver	Bronze
Extra lightweight −48 kg	Tomoko Fukumi; Japan	Kim Myong-ok; North Korea	Kim Young-ran; South Korea
Extra lightweight −48 kg	Tomoko Fukumi; Japan	Kim Myong-ok; North Korea	Shao Dan; China
Half lightweight −52 kg	An Kum-ae; North Korea	Kim Kyung-ok; South Korea	Mönkhbaataryn Bundmaa; Mongolia
Half lightweight −52 kg	An Kum-ae; North Korea	Kim Kyung-ok; South Korea	Yuki Yokosawa; Japan
Lightweight −57 kg	Khishigbatyn Erdenet-Od; Mongolia	Juri Miyamoto; Japan	Yu Yaling; China
Lightweight −57 kg	Khishigbatyn Erdenet-Od; Mongolia	Juri Miyamoto; Japan	Jung Hae-mi; South Korea
Half middleweight −63 kg	Yoshie Ueno; Japan	Wang Chin-fang; Chinese Taipei	He Xiaoli; China
Half middleweight −63 kg	Yoshie Ueno; Japan	Wang Chin-fang; Chinese Taipei	Lee Book-hee; South Korea
Middleweight −70 kg	Mina Watanabe; Japan	Liu Shu-yun; Chinese Taipei	Bae Eun-hye; South Korea
Middleweight −70 kg	Mina Watanabe; Japan	Liu Shu-yun; Chinese Taipei	Kalzhan Taizhanova; Kazakhstan
Half heavyweight −78 kg	Sae Nakazawa; Japan	Kim Ryon-mi; North Korea	Jeong Gyeong-mi; South Korea
Half heavyweight −78 kg	Sae Nakazawa; Japan	Kim Ryon-mi; North Korea	Zhang Yanchun; China
Heavyweight +78 kg	Mika Sugimoto; Japan	Yu Song; China	Mariya Shekerova; Uzbekistan
Heavyweight +78 kg	Mika Sugimoto; Japan	Yu Song; China	Jeong Ji-won; South Korea
Openweight	Mika Sugimoto; Japan	Sagat Abikeyeva; Kazakhstan	Yu Song; China
Openweight	Mika Sugimoto; Japan	Sagat Abikeyeva; Kazakhstan	Mariya Shekerova; Uzbekistan

== Medal table ==
Rank	Nation	Gold	Silver	Bronze	Total
1	Japan	8	4	4	16
2	South Korea	3	2	7	12
3	Mongolia	2	1	2	5
4	North Korea	1	2	0	3
5	Iran	1	1	1	3
6	Uzbekistan	1	0	4	5
7	Kazakhstan	0	3	4	7
8	Chinese Taipei	0	2	1	3
9	China	0	1	5	6
10	Tajikistan	0	0	3	3
11	Kuwait	0	0	1	1
Totals (11 entries)		16	16	32	64
