= Janelle Shepherd =

Australian Olympic judoka

Personal information
- Nationality: Australia
- Born: 3 May 1985 (age 41) Sydney, New South Wales, Australia
- Height: 1.70 m (5 ft 7 in)
- Weight: 83 kg (183 lb)

Sport
- Sport: Judo
- Event: +78 kg
- Club: University of New South Wales; Judo Club
- Coached by: John Buckley

Janelle Shepherd (born 3 May 1985 in Sydney, New South Wales) is an Australian judoka, who played for the women's heavyweight category. She is a five-time Australian judo champion for her respective division (2005, 2006, 2008, 2009, and 2010), and a member of the University of New South Wales Judo Club under her personal coach John Buckley.

Shepherd represented Australia at the 2008 Summer Olympics in Beijing, where she competed for the women's +78 kg class. She defeated Italy's Michela Torrenti, and Germany's Sandra Köppen in the preliminary rounds, before losing the quarterfinal match to Cuba's Idalys Ortiz, by an ippon (full point) and an okuri eri jime (sliding lapel strangle). Because her opponent advanced further into the semi-finals, Shepherd offered another for the bronze medal by entering the repechage rounds. She finished in ninth place, after losing out the second repechage bout to Egypt's Samah Ramadan, who scored an ippon and a yoko shiho gatame, at one minute and thirty-six seconds.
