= 2009 Asian Judo Championships =

Asian Judo competition

The 2009 Asian Judo Championships were held at Taipei Arena in Taipei, Taiwan from 23 May to 24 May 2009.

== Medal summary ==
=== Men ===
Event	Gold	Silver	Bronze
Extra lightweight −60 kg	Ganbatyn Boldbaatar; Mongolia	Kim Kyong-jin; North Korea	Choi Gwang-hyeon; South Korea
Extra lightweight −60 kg	Ganbatyn Boldbaatar; Mongolia	Kim Kyong-jin; North Korea	Rishod Sobirov; Uzbekistan
Half lightweight −66 kg	Tatsuaki Egusa; Japan	An Jeong-hwan; South Korea	Azat Kubakaev; Kyrgyzstan
Half lightweight −66 kg	Tatsuaki Egusa; Japan	An Jeong-hwan; South Korea	Sanjaasürengiin Miyaaragchaa; Mongolia
Lightweight −73 kg	Bang Gui-man; South Korea	Ramashrey Yadav; India	Kim Chol-su; North Korea
Lightweight −73 kg	Bang Gui-man; South Korea	Ramashrey Yadav; India	Sainjargalyn Nyam-Ochir; Mongolia
Half middleweight −81 kg	Kim Jae-bum; South Korea	Masahiro Takamatsu; Japan	Guo Lei; China
Half middleweight −81 kg	Kim Jae-bum; South Korea	Masahiro Takamatsu; Japan	Shokir Muminov; Uzbekistan
Middleweight −90 kg	Masashi Nishiyama; Japan	Dilshod Choriev; Uzbekistan	Timur Bolat; Kazakhstan
Middleweight −90 kg	Masashi Nishiyama; Japan	Dilshod Choriev; Uzbekistan	He Yanzhu; China
Half heavyweight −100 kg	Maxim Rakov; Kazakhstan	Hwang Hee-tae; South Korea	Shao Ning; China
Half heavyweight −100 kg	Maxim Rakov; Kazakhstan	Hwang Hee-tae; South Korea	Battulgyn Temüülen; Mongolia
Heavyweight +100 kg	Kim Soo-whan; South Korea	Keiji Suzuki; Japan	Ehsan Rajabi; Iran
Heavyweight +100 kg	Kim Soo-whan; South Korea	Keiji Suzuki; Japan	Ulan Ryskul; Kazakhstan
Openweight	Kim Soo-whan; South Korea	Hiroki Tachiyama; Japan	Adiljan Tulendibaev; Uzbekistan
Openweight	Kim Soo-whan; South Korea	Hiroki Tachiyama; Japan	Dorjpalamyn Gankhuyag; Mongolia

=== Women ===
Event	Gold	Silver	Bronze
Extra lightweight −48 kg	Chung Jung-yeon; South Korea	Shoko Ibe; Japan	Mo Qinqin; China
Extra lightweight −48 kg	Chung Jung-yeon; South Korea	Shoko Ibe; Japan	Mönkhbatyn Urantsetseg; Mongolia
Half lightweight −52 kg	He Hongmei; China	Mönkhbaataryn Bundmaa; Mongolia	Eri Kakita; Japan
Half lightweight −52 kg	He Hongmei; China	Mönkhbaataryn Bundmaa; Mongolia	Lenariya Mingazova; Kazakhstan
Lightweight −57 kg	Rim Yun-hui; North Korea	Hitomi Tokuhisa; Japan	Tümen-Odyn Battögs; Mongolia
Lightweight −57 kg	Rim Yun-hui; North Korea	Hitomi Tokuhisa; Japan	Sun Rong; China
Half middleweight −63 kg	Lin Meiling; China	Hwang Chun-gum; North Korea	Zarina Aldikova; Kazakhstan
Half middleweight −63 kg	Lin Meiling; China	Hwang Chun-gum; North Korea	Tsedevsürengiin Mönkhzayaa; Mongolia
Middleweight −70 kg	Tomoe Ueno; Japan	Yao Yuting; China	Hwang Ye-sul; South Korea
Middleweight −70 kg	Tomoe Ueno; Japan	Yao Yuting; China	Pürevjargalyn Lkhamdegd; Mongolia
Half heavyweight −78 kg	Jeong Gyeong-mi; South Korea	Yadmaagiin Dulmaa; Mongolia	Hyon Jong-hui; North Korea
Half heavyweight −78 kg	Jeong Gyeong-mi; South Korea	Yadmaagiin Dulmaa; Mongolia	Hitomi Ikeda; Japan
Heavyweight +78 kg	Gulzhan Issanova; Kazakhstan	Li Yiqing; China	Kim Na-young; South Korea
Heavyweight +78 kg	Gulzhan Issanova; Kazakhstan	Li Yiqing; China	Mai Tateyama; Japan
Openweight	Li Yiqing; China	Kim Na-young; South Korea	Yadmaagiin Dulmaa; Mongolia
Openweight	Li Yiqing; China	Kim Na-young; South Korea	Mai Tateyama; Japan

== Medal table ==
Rank	Nation	Gold	Silver	Bronze	Total
1	South Korea	6	3	3	12
2	Japan	3	5	4	12
3	China	3	2	5	10
4	Kazakhstan	2	0	4	6
5	Mongolia	1	2	9	12
6	North Korea	1	2	2	5
7	Uzbekistan	0	1	3	4
8	India	0	1	0	1
9	Iran	0	0	1	1
9	Kyrgyzstan	0	0	1	1
Totals (10 entries)		16	16	32	64

== See also ==
- List of sporting events in Taiwan
