= Salamat Utarbayev =

Kazakhstani judoka (born 1981)

Medal record

Representing Kazakhstan

Men's Judo

Asian Games
Bronze medal – third place	2006 Doha	-60 kg

Asian Championships
Bronze medal – third place	2005 Tashkent	-60 kg
Bronze medal – third place	2008 Jeju City	-60 kg

Salamat Utarbayev (born 7 November 1981) is a Kazakhstani judoka.

He won a bronze medal in the extra-lightweight (60 kg) category of the 2006 Asian Games, having won the bronze medal match against Jia Yunbing of China.

He currently resides in Aqtöbe.
