= Karina Bryant =

British judoka (born 1979)

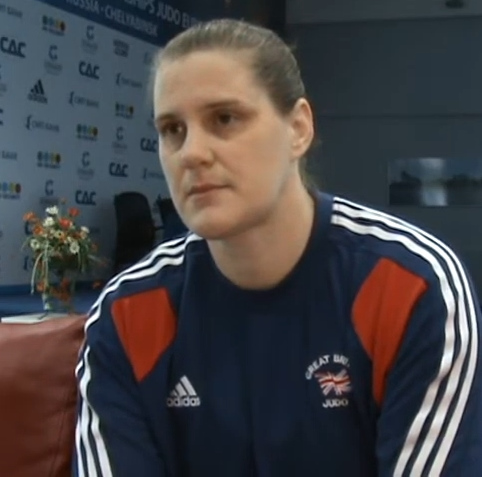
- Bryant in April 2012

Personal information
- Nationality: British
- Born: 27 January 1979 (age 47) Kingston-upon-Thames, London
- Home town: Camberley, Surrey
- Occupation: Judoka
- Height: 1.84 m (6 ft 0 in)
- Weight: 103 kg (227 lb) (2012)

Sport
- Country: Great Britain
- Sport: Judo
- Weight class: +78 kg
- Club: Camberley judo club
- Coached by: Luke Preston
- Retired: 2 August 2013

Achievements and titles
- Olympic Games: (bronze) (2012)
- World Champ.: (silver) (2001, 2003, 2005, 2005, 2009)
- European Champ.: (gold) (1998, 2000, 2003, 2005)
Medal record
Women's judo
Representing Great Britain
Olympic Games
Bronze medal – third place	2012 London	+78 kg
World Championships
Silver medal – second place	2001 Munich	Open
Silver medal – second place	2003 Osaka	Open
Silver medal – second place	2005 Cairo	+78 kg
Silver medal – second place	2005 Cairo	Open
Silver medal – second place	2009 Rotterdam	+78 kg
Bronze medal – third place	1999 Birmingham	+78 kg
Bronze medal – third place	2003 Osaka	+78 kg
European Championships
Gold medal – first place	1998 Oviedo	+78 kg
Gold medal – first place	2000 Wrocław	+78 kg
Gold medal – first place	2003 Düsseldorf	+78 kg
Gold medal – first place	2005 Rotterdam	+78 kg
Silver medal – second place	2004 Bucharest	+78 kg
Bronze medal – third place	2001 Paris	Open
Bronze medal – third place	2010 Vienna	+78 kg
Bronze medal – third place	2012 Chelyabinsk	+78 kg
IJF Grand Prix
Bronze medal – third place	2011 Amsterdam	+78 kg
Bronze medal – third place	2011 Qingdao	+78 kg
World Juniors Championships
Gold medal – first place	1996 Porto	+72 kg
Gold medal – first place	1998 Cali	+78 kg
European Junior Championships
Gold medal – first place	1998 Bucharest	+78 kg
Silver medal – second place	1995 Valladolid	+72 kg
Silver medal – second place	1996 Monte Carlo	+72 kg
Silver medal – second place	1997 Ljubljana	+72 kg

Profile at external databases
- IJF: 109
- JudoInside.com: 305
- Updated on 28 May 2023

Karina Bryant (born 27 January 1979) is a British retired elite judoka, who was active in elite senior competition in the 2000s and early 2010s. She represented Great Britain at four successive Olympics between 2000 and 2012, winning her first Olympic medal, a bronze, in the heavyweight event at her final Games, the 2012 Summer Olympics in London. She was a seven-time medallist at both the European Judo Championships and the World Judo Championships, and was European Champion on four occasions.

Bryant announced her retirement from professional Judo in August 2013.

== Early life ==
Born in Kingston-upon-Thames, London, Bryant learnt judo as a child. At the age of ten she joined the Camberley club and earned her black belt less than six years later. She competed for Kingston in the London Youth Games.

== Career ==
She entered the European Junior Championships in 1995, competing in the over 72 kg class, she finished with a silver medal. The following year another European silver medal followed, but she went one place better and won the World Junior Championships. She won a further Junior World title in 1998, and won the European title for the first time in that same year.

She made her first Olympic appearance at the 2000 Summer Games in Sydney, Australia. She was a member of the British squad that attended the opening ceremony and has fond memories of it, "I remember just seeing so many British flags and it felt so good. I will never forget that moment." She reached the round of 16, but was eliminated from the competition.

She was selected twice more for Great Britain at the Olympics in 2004 in Athens, and in 2008 in Beijing. She reached the quarter-finals in 2004, but did not make it through the repechage round, and only reached the round of 16 once more in 2008.

=== 2012 and the London Olympics ===
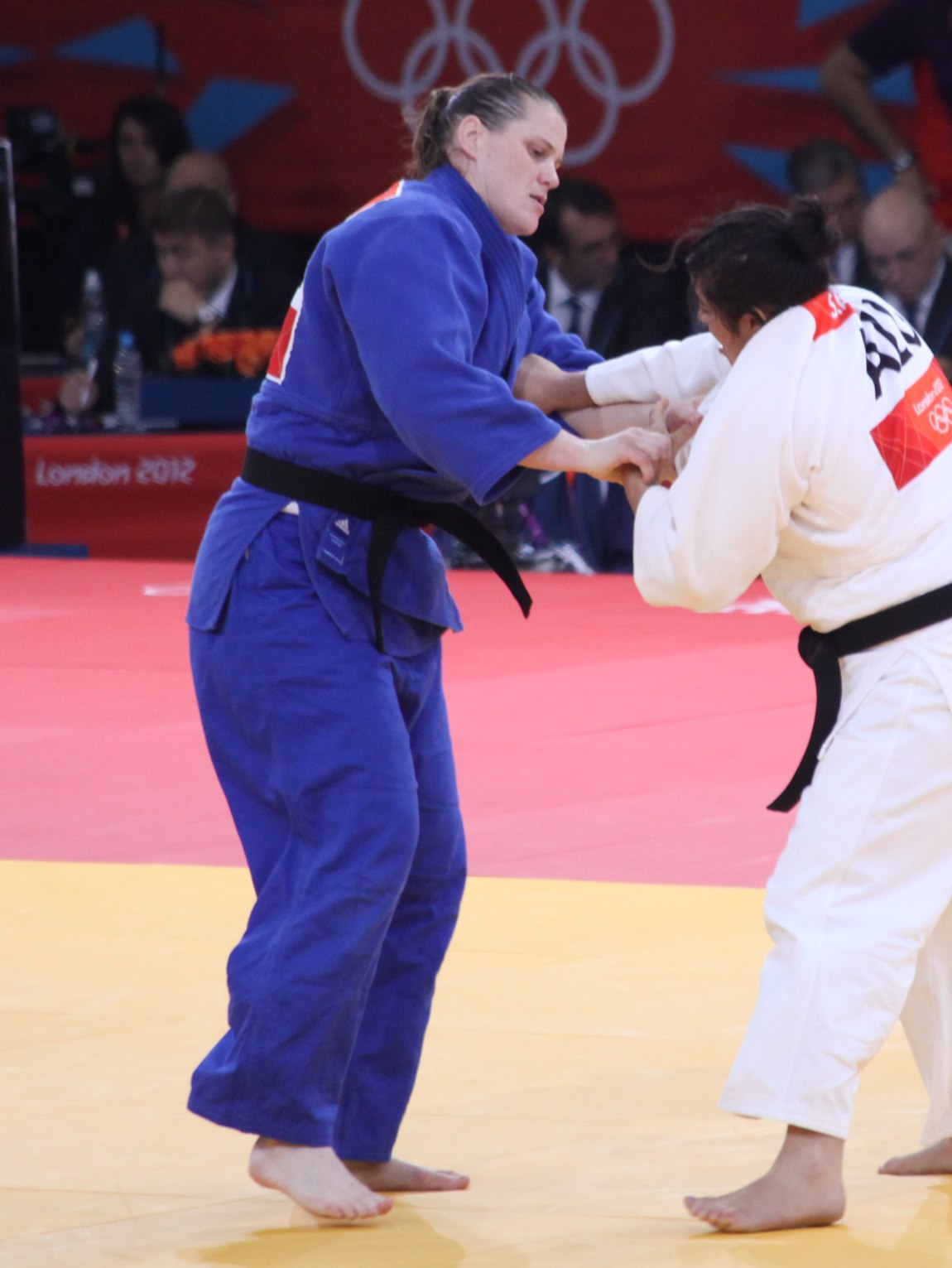
Bryant (in blue Judogi) competing at the 2012 Summer Olympics in London

She suffered an injury to her neck in 2011 and was unable to train for six months, but she took part in an intensive month of training during 2012 to restore her fitness levels. She had been funded by the National Lottery so that she could train for the 2012 Summer Olympics, but found it financially difficult to do so. She launched a campaign to raise £5,000 so that she could afford to buy a car to get to training. She competed at the 2012 European Championships and qualified out of the pool stage, but was beaten by Russian Elena Ivashchenko. She won the following repechage round to claim the bronze medal at the tournament, her seventh medal at the European stage.

On 26 June 2012, Bryant was confirmed a competitor with the rest of the British judoka squad. She was selected to compete in the over 78 kg section, and the appearance would mark it as her fourth Olympic Games. On 3 August, she started her campaign at the Games; her first match was a victory over Algeria's competitor Sonia Asselah. In her round of 16, she edged past third-seeded Slovenian Lucija Polavder, the 2008 Olympic bronze medalist. In the quarter-final she beat Kazakhstan's Gulzhan Issanova to set up a semi-final match against Japan's Mika Sugimoto. However, she lost that bout, sending her into a play-off for the bronze medal against Iryna Kindzerska from Ukraine.

After initially going down by a waza-ari, she responded with one of her own. Her opponent scored a yuko on her, but Bryant took another waza-ari, which combined with the first gave her an ippon, the victory in the bout and the bronze medal. It was the second medal of the Games for a British competitor in the Judo contests after Gemma Gibbons had won a silver a day earlier, something Bryant said had inspired her to go on and get a medal of her own. She dedicated her medal to the rest of the British judo squad. Following her victory, Bryant stated that she had not yet ruled out competing at the 2016 Summer Olympics in Rio, which would be her fifth Olympic Games.

=== Retirement ===
On 2 August 2013 Bryant announced her retirement from professional Judo saying "I feel my body is telling me this is the right time to retire." She had three surgeries after the London Olympics but aggravated an old injury when she tried to return to training.

== Achievements ==
Year	Tournament	Place	Weight class
2012	Olympic Games	3rd	Heavyweight (+78 kg)
2007	World Championships	5th	Heavyweight (+78 kg)
2006	European Championships	7th	Heavyweight (+78 kg)
2005	World Championships	2nd	Heavyweight (+78 kg)
2005	World Championships	2nd	Open class
2005	European Championships	1st	Heavyweight (+78 kg)
2004	European Championships	2	Heavyweight (+78 kg)
2003	World Championships	3rd	Heavyweight (+78 kg)
2003	World Championships	2nd	Open class
2003	European Championships	1st	Heavyweight (+78 kg)
2002	European Championships	7th	Open class
2001	World Championships	5th	Heavyweight (+78 kg)
2001	World Championships	2nd	Open class
2001	European Championships	3rd	Open class
2000	European Championships	1st	Heavyweight (+78 kg)
1999	World Championships	3rd	Heavyweight (+78 kg)
1999	European Championships	5th	Heavyweight (+78 kg)
1998	European Championships	1st	Heavyweight (+78 kg)

== See also ==
- Judo in the United Kingdom
