= Mika Sugimoto =

Japanese judoka (born 1984)

Personal information
- Born: 27 August 1984 (age 42)
- Occupation: Judoka

Sport
- Country: Japan
- Sport: Judo
- Weight class: +78 kg

Achievements and titles
- Olympic Games: (silver) (2012)
- World Champ.: (gold) (2010, 2010)
- Asian Champ.: (gold) (2005, 2005, 2008, 2010)
Medal record
Women's judo
Representing Japan
Olympic Games
Silver medal – second place	2012 London	+78 kg
World Championships
Gold medal – first place	2010 Tokyo	+78 kg
Gold medal – first place	2010 Tokyo	Open
Bronze medal – third place	2008 Paris Levallois	Open
Bronze medal – third place	2011 Paris	+78 kg
Bronze medal – third place	2011 Tyumen	Open
Asian Games
Gold medal – first place	2010 Guangzhou	+78 kg
Asian Championships
Gold medal – first place	2005 Tashkent	+78 kg
Gold medal – first place	2005 Tashkent	Open
Gold medal – first place	2008 Jeju	Open
Silver medal – second place	2004 Almaty	Open
World Masters
Silver medal – second place	2011 Baku	+78 kg
Bronze medal – third place	2012 Almaty	+78 kg
IJF Grand Slam
Gold medal – first place	2009 Rio de Janeiro	+78 kg
Gold medal – first place	2011 Tokyo	+78 kg
Silver medal – second place	2008 Tokyo	+78 kg
IJF Grand Prix
Gold medal – first place	2011 Düsseldorf	+78 kg
Silver medal – second place	2009 Hamburg	+78 kg
Summer Universiade
Silver medal – second place	2003 Jeju	Open
Bronze medal – third place	2007 Bangkok	+78 kg

Profile at external databases
- IJF: 2012
- JudoInside.com: 22358
- Updated on 28 May 2023

Mika Sugimoto (杉本 美香, Sugimoto Mika; born 27 August 1984 in Itami, Hyōgo) is a Japanese female judoka. She won a silver medal at the 2012 Summer Olympics, as well as the gold medal in the heavyweight (+78 kg) division and in the openweight division at the 2010 World Judo Championships.

== Athletic career ==
The 1.65 m tall Mika Sugimoto won the silver medal in the open class at the 2003 Universiade. In the final, she lost to Xue Fuyan of China. She also lost to a Chinese opponent in the open class final at the 2004 Asian Championships, this time Xu Lihui. A year later in Tashkent, Sugimoto won both the heavyweight title against Yu Song of China and the open class title against Sagat Abikeeva of Kazakhstan.
