= Tong Wen =

Chinese judoka (born 1983)

Personal information
- Born: 1 February 1983 (age 43)
- Occupation: Judoka

Sport
- Country: China
- Sport: Judo
- Weight class: +78 kg

Achievements and titles
- Olympic Games: (gold) (2008)
- World Champ.: (gold) (2003, 2005, 2007, 2008, 2009, 2011, 2011)
- Asian Champ.: (gold) (2000, 2002, 2006)
Medal record
Women's judo
Representing China
Olympic Games
Gold medal – first place	2008 Beijing	+78 kg
Bronze medal – third place	2012 London	+78 kg
World Championships
Gold medal – first place	2003 Osaka	Open
Gold medal – first place	2005 Cairo	+78 kg
Gold medal – first place	2007 Rio de Janeiro	+78 kg
Gold medal – first place	2008 Paris Levallois	Open
Gold medal – first place	2009 Rotterdam	+78 kg
Gold medal – first place	2011 Paris	+78 kg
Gold medal – first place	2011 Tyumen	Open
Bronze medal – third place	2001 Munich	Open
Asian Games
Gold medal – first place	2002 Busan	Open
Gold medal – first place	2006 Doha	+78 kg
Asian Championships
Gold medal – first place	2000 Osaka	+78 kg
World Masters
Silver medal – second place	2012 Almaty	+78 kg
IJF Grand Slam
Gold medal – first place	2009 Paris	+78 kg
Gold medal – first place	2011 Moscow	+78 kg
IJF Grand Prix
Gold medal – first place	2011 Qingdao	+78 kg
World Juniors Championships
Bronze medal – third place	2000 Nabeul	+78 kg
Asian Junior Championships
Silver medal – second place	2000 Hong Kong	+78 kg
Summer Universiade
Gold medal – first place	2007 Bangkok	+78 kg
Bronze medal – third place	2001 Beijing	Open

Profile at external databases
- IJF: 36
- JudoInside.com: 12071
- Updated on 28 May 2023

Tong Wen (Chinese: 佟文; pinyin: Tóng Wén; born 1 February 1983 in Tianjin) is a Chinese judoka. Born in Tianjin, she began training in Judo when she was 13.

== Career ==
At the 2008 Summer Olympics she won a gold medal in the +78 category. She also won gold medals at the World Judo Championships of 2003, 2005, 2007, 2009 and 2011 as well as a bronze medal in 2001.

On 10 May 2010, she was banned for two years by the International Judo Federation because of Clenbuterol doping and was required to give back her gold medal from the World Championships of 2009. Tong subsequently contested the ban and took her case to the Court of Arbitration for Sport which ruled that a doping violation could not be proved and found, in her favor, ordering that she be reinstated immediately with all rights. She returned to international competition in May 2011, winning gold at the Moscow Grand Slam.
