= Yohei Takai =

Japanese judoka (born 1982)

Personal information
- Born: 27 August 1982 (age 43)
- Occupation: Judoka

Sport
- Country: Japan
- Sport: Judo
- Weight class: +100 kg

Achievements and titles
- World Champ.: (bronze) (2005)
- Asian Champ.: (bronze) (2006)
Medal record
Men's judo
Representing Japan
World Championships
Bronze medal – third place	2005 Cairo	Open
Asian Games
Bronze medal – third place	2006 Doha	Open
IJF Grand Slam
Gold medal – first place	2008 Tokyo	+100 kg
East Asian Games
Gold medal – first place	2009 Hong Kong	+100 kg
East Asian Championships
Gold medal – first place	2007 Shenzhen	+100 kg
Gold medal – first place	2008 Taipei	+100 kg
World Juniors Championships
Bronze medal – third place	2000 Nabeul	+100 kg

Profile at external databases
- IJF: 6476
- JudoInside.com: 12715
- Updated on 23 February 2022

Yohei Takai (高井 洋平, Takai Yōhei; born 27 August 1982) is a Japanese judoka. He won a bronze medal at the open category of the 2005 World Judo Championships.

Takai is from Kanagawa Prefecture. After graduation from Kokushikan University, he joined to Asahi Kasei which former world champions, Hiroshi Izumi and Masato Uchishiba also belong to.

== Achievements ==
Year	Date	Tournament	Place	Weight class
2008	1.27	Tbilisi World Cup	1st	Heavyweight (+100 kg)
2007	12.9	Jigoro Kano Cup	3rd	Heavyweight (+100 kg)
2007	11.30	KRA Cup Korea Open	1st	Heavyweight (+100 kg)
2007	11.18	Kodokan Cup	5th	Heavyweight (+100 kg)
2007	10.30	East Asian Championships	1st	Heavyweight (+100 kg)
2007	4.29	All-Japan Championships	5th	-
2007	4.12	All-Japan Weight Class Championships	1st	Heavyweight (+100 kg)
2007	2.24	Hamburg Super World Cup	Round of 16	Heavyweight (+100 kg)
2006	12.5	Asian Games	3rd	Heavyweight (+100 kg)
2006	4.29	All-Japan Championships	5th	-
2006	4.2	All-Japan Weight Class Championships	2nd	Heavyweight (+100 kg)
2006	2.11	Paris Super World Cup	1st	Heavyweight (+100 kg)
2006	2.4	Tbilisi World Cup	1st	Heavyweight (+100 kg)
2006	1.15	Jigoro Kano Cup	1st	Heavyweight (+100 kg)
2005	9.11	World Championships	3rd	Openweight
2005	4.29	All-Japan Championships	3rd	-
2005	4.3	All-Japan Weight Class Championships	1st	Heavyweight (+100 kg)
2005	1.9	Jigoro Kano Cup	5th	-
2004	12.3	KRA Cup Korea Open	3rd	Heavyweight (+100 kg)
2004	11.21	Kodokan Cup	1st	Heavyweight (+100 kg)
2002	?	The Belgian Judo League	2nd	Heavyweight (+100 kg)
2002	9.12	World Junior Championships	3rd	Heavyweight (+100 kg)
2001	8.23	Universiade	7th	Openweight
2001	1.14	Jigoro Kano Cup	5th	-
2000	11.25	Kodokan Cup	3rd	Heavyweight (+100 kg)
