= Judo at the 2006 Asian Games – Men's openweight =

Judo competition

Men's openweight at the 2006 Asian Games
- Venue: Qatar SC Indoor Hall
- Date: 5 December 2006
- Competitors: 16 from 16 nations

Medalists
gold medal	Kim Sung-bum	South Korea
silver medal	Mahmoud Miran	Iran
bronze medal	Askhat Zhitkeyev	Kazakhstan
bronze medal	Yohei Takai	Japan

The men's openweight competition at the 2006 Asian Games in Doha was held on 5 December 2006 at the Qatar SC Indoor Hall. Kim Sung-bum won the gold medal.

== Schedule ==
All times are Arabia Standard Time (UTC+03:00)

Date	Time	Event
Tuesday, 5 December 2006	14:00	Round of 16
Tuesday, 5 December 2006	14:00	Quarterfinals
Tuesday, 5 December 2006	14:00	Repechage −1R
Tuesday, 5 December 2006	14:00	Repechage final
Tuesday, 5 December 2006	14:00	Semifinals
Tuesday, 5 December 2006	14:00	Finals

== Results ==
=== Main bracket ===
Round of 16
Ghanam Al-Dikan (KUW)	0011
Anil Kumar (IND)	0020
Khaled Al-Araifi (BRN)	0001
Mahmoud Miran (IRI)	1001
Adiljan Tulendibaev (UZB)	1010
Tomohiko Hoshina (PHI)	0100
Yohei Takai (JPN)	1100
Yahya Hsaba (SYR)	0000
Naidangiin Tüvshinbayar (MGL)	0000
Kim Sung-bum (KOR)	1000
Yin Hongxing (CHN)	1000
Tharalat Sutthiphun (THA)	0000
Danil Babaev (KGZ)	0000
Askhat Zhitkeyev (KAZ)	1000
Hudaýberdi Sahatow (TKM)	0200
Krisna Bayu (INA)	0000

Quarterfinals
Anil Kumar (IND)	0000
Mahmoud Miran (IRI)	1001
Adiljan Tulendibaev (UZB)	0000
Yohei Takai (JPN)	1000
Kim Sung-bum (KOR)	1000
Yin Hongxing (CHN)	0000
Askhat Zhitkeyev (KAZ)	0200
Hudaýberdi Sahatow (TKM)	0000

Semifinals
Mahmoud Miran (IRI)	1000
Yohei Takai (JPN)	0000
Kim Sung-bum (KOR)	0010
Askhat Zhitkeyev (KAZ)	0000

Gold medal contest
Mahmoud Miran (IRI)	0000
Kim Sung-bum (KOR)	0001

=== Repechage ===
Repechage −1R
Khaled Al-Araifi (BRN)	0001
Anil Kumar (IND)	1001
Yahya Hsaba (SYR)	0000
Adiljan Tulendibaev (UZB)	1000
Naidangiin Tüvshinbayar (MGL)	1000
Yin Hongxing (CHN)	0000
Danil Babaev (KGZ)	1001
Hudaýberdi Sahatow (TKM)	0000

Repechage final
Anil Kumar (IND)	0000
Adiljan Tulendibaev (UZB)	1010
Naidangiin Tüvshinbayar (MGL)	0100
Danil Babaev (KGZ)	0001

Bronze medal contest
Adiljan Tulendibaev (UZB)	0000
Askhat Zhitkeyev (KAZ)	1001
Naidangiin Tüvshinbayar (MGL)	0000
Yohei Takai (JPN)	1000
