= Maki Tsukada =

Japanese judoka (born 1982)

Personal information
- Born: 5 January 1982 (age 44)
- Occupation: Judoka

Sport
- Country: Japan
- Sport: Judo
- Weight class: +78 kg

Achievements and titles
- Olympic Games: (gold) (2004)
- World Champ.: (gold) (2007)
- Asian Champ.: (silver) (2002)
Medal record
Women's judo
Representing Japan
Olympic Games
Gold medal – first place	2004 Athens	+78 kg
Silver medal – second place	2008 Beijing	+78 kg
World Championships
Gold medal – first place	2007 Rio de Janeiro	Open
Silver medal – second place	2003 Osaka	+78 kg
Silver medal – second place	2007 Rio de Janeiro	+78 kg
Bronze medal – third place	2005 Cairo	+78 kg
Bronze medal – third place	2009 Rotterdam	+78 kg
Bronze medal – third place	2010 Tokyo	+78 kg
Asian Games
Silver medal – second place	2002 Busan	Open
IJF Grand Slam
Gold medal – first place	2009 Moscow	+78 kg
Gold medal – first place	2009 Tokyo	+78 kg
Gold medal – first place	2010 Moscow	+78 kg
World Juniors Championships
Gold medal – first place	2000 Nabeul	+78 kg
Summer Universiade
Silver medal – second place	2001 Beijing	+78 kg

Profile at external databases
- IJF: 10243
- JudoInside.com: 10956
- Updated on 30 May 2023

Maki Tsukada (塚田 真希, Tsukada Maki) (born 5 January 1982) is a Japanese judoka, who was born in Shimotsuma, Ibaraki Prefecture. She won the Women's +78 kg category gold medal at the Athens Olympics in 2004 and the silver medal at the 2008 Beijing Olympics.

In September 2003, Tsukada won the silver medal at the World championships in Osaka, Japan. In September 2005, she won the bronze medal at the World championships in Cairo, Egypt. She won gold at the 2007 World Championships in Rio de Janeiro, Brazil.
