= Abdullo Tangriev =

Uzbekistani judoka (born 1981)

Personal information
- Full name: Abdullo Tangriev
- Nationality: Uzbek
- Born: 28 March 1981 (age 45) Surxondaryo Region, Uzbek SSR, Soviet Union
- Occupation: Judoka
- Height: 1.90 m (6 ft 3 in)
- Weight: 132 kg (291 lb)

Sport
- Country: Uzbekistan
- Sport: Judo
- Weight class: +100 kg
- Turned pro: 2000-

Achievements and titles
- Olympic Games: (silver) (2008)
- World Champ.: (gold) (2011)
- Asian Champ.: (gold) (2003, 2005, 2007, 2008, 2011, 2015)
Medal record
Men's judo
Representing Uzbekistan
Olympic Games
Silver medal – second place	2008 Beijing	+100 kg
World Championships
Gold medal – first place	2011 Tyumen	Open
Bronze medal – third place	2003 Osaka	Open
Bronze medal – third place	2007 Rio de Janeiro	Open
Bronze medal – third place	2009 Rotterdam	+100 kg
Asian Games
Silver medal – second place	2002 Busan	Open
Silver medal – second place	2010 Guangzhou	+100 kg
Bronze medal – third place	2006 Doha	+100 kg
Bronze medal – third place	2014 Incheon	+100 kg
Bronze medal – third place	2014 Incheon	Men's team
Asian Championships
Gold medal – first place	2003 Jeju	+100 kg
Gold medal – first place	2005 Tashkent	Open
Gold medal – first place	2007 Kuwait City	+100 kg
Gold medal – first place	2008 Jeju	+100 kg
Gold medal – first place	2011 Abu Dhabi	+100 kg
Gold medal – first place	2015 Kuwait City	+100 kg
Silver medal – second place	2016 Tashkent	+100 kg
Bronze medal – third place	2004 Almaty	+100 kg
IJF Grand Slam
Gold medal – first place	2012 Moscow	+100 kg
Bronze medal – third place	2009 Paris	+100 kg
Bronze medal – third place	2009 Tokyo	+100 kg
Bronze medal – third place	2011 Moscow	+100 kg
Bronze medal – third place	2011 Tokyo	+100 kg
Bronze medal – third place	2012 Paris	+100 kg
IJF Grand Prix
Gold medal – first place	2009 Hamburg	+100 kg
Silver medal – second place	2009 Abu Dhabi	+100 kg
Bronze medal – third place	2010 Abu Dhabi	+100 kg
Asian Junior Championships
Gold medal – first place	2000 Hong Kong	+100 kg
Summer Universiade
Gold medal – first place	2003 Jeju	+100 kg
Gold medal – first place	2003 Jeju	Open
Silver medal – second place	2001 Beijing	Open
Bronze medal – third place	2001 Beijing	+100 kg

Profile at external databases
- IJF: 712
- JudoInside.com: 11898
- Updated on 30 May 2023

Abdullo Tangriev (born 28 March 1981) is an Uzbek judoka. He won a silver medal in the +100 kg category at the 2008 Olympic Games.

== Early life ==
Abdullo Tangriev was born on 28 March 1981, in Surxondaryo Region. He was engaged with judo from the age 10. From 1995 he started training in Chirchiq Olympics school. He was able to show his talent from early ages, and in the age of 19 he was called to the Uzbekistan National Olympics team, and attended in 2000 Summer Olympics

== Career ==
After the Olympics, he won the Uzbekistan championship from judo, in 2001. In 2003 for the first time in his career he became the champion of Asia, in super weight category which was held in Jeju Province. In coming for years (2005, 2007, 2008, 2011) he also became the champion of Asia in judo.

In the same year of 2003 Tangriev won the third place in 23rd World Judo Championship which took place in Osaka. In the years of 2005 (Rio de Janeiro) and 2009 (Rotterdam) he twice was honored as the bronze medal owner in Judo World Championship.

In 2008 Summer Olympics Tangriev was able to reach the final stage of tournament in category of 100kg's, where he lost the fight, and got the second place.

In 2012 Summer Olympics Tangriev was disqualified from professional sport, due to cannabis being detected in his drug test.
