= Cho Nam-suk =

South Korean judoka (born 1981)

Personal information
- Born: August 13, 1981 (age 44)

Sport

Korean name
- Hangul: 조남석
- Hanja: 趙南錫
- RR: Jo Namseok
- MR: Cho Namsŏk
Medal record
Men's judo
Representing South Korea
World Championships
Bronze medal – third place	2005 Cairo	-60 kg
Asian Games
Silver medal – second place	2006 Doha	-60 kg
Asian Championships
Gold medal – first place	2005 Tashkent	-60 kg
Silver medal – second place	2004 Almaty	-60 kg

Cho Nam-suk (born August 13, 1981) is a male South Korean judoka.

At the 2005 World Judo Championships in Cairo he won a bronze medal in the extra lightweight competition.

He won a gold medal at the -60 kg category of the 2005 Asian Judo Championships in Tashkent.
