= Tatsuaki Egusa =

Japanese judoka (born 1976)

Personal information
- Born: 28 October 1976 (age 49)
- Occupation: Judoka

Sport
- Country: Japan
- Sport: Judo
- Weight class: ‍–‍60 kg, ‍–‍66 kg

Achievements and titles
- World Champ.: 7th (2007)
- Asian Champ.: (gold) (2000, 2006, 2009)
Medal record
Men's judo
Representing Japan
Asian Games
Gold medal – first place	2006 Doha	‍–‍60 kg
Asian Championships
Gold medal – first place	2000 Osaka	‍–‍60 kg
Gold medal – first place	2009 Taipei	‍–‍66 kg
Silver medal – second place	2005 Tashkent	‍–‍60 kg
Bronze medal – third place	1999 Wenzhou	‍–‍60 kg
Bronze medal – third place	2001 Ulaanbaatar	‍–‍60 kg
Bronze medal – third place	2003 Jeju	‍–‍60 kg
Bronze medal – third place	2004 Almaty	‍–‍60 kg
IJF Grand Slam
Gold medal – first place	2008 Tokyo	‍–‍66 kg

Profile at external databases
- IJF: 2158
- JudoInside.com: 2856
- Updated on 28 January 2024

Tatsuaki Egusa (江種 辰明, Egusa Tatsuaki; born 28 October 1976) is a Japanese judoka. He won a gold medal at the ‍–‍60 kg category in Judo at the 2006 Asian Games.

Egusa is from Yukuhashi, Fukuoka. After graduation from Tenri University, He belongs to Tokyo Metropolitan Police Department.
