= Judo at the 2006 Asian Games – Women's +78 kg =

Judo competition

Women's +78 kg at the 2006 Asian Games
- Venue: Qatar SC Indoor Hall
- Date: 2 December 2006
- Competitors: 7 from 7 nations

Medalists
gold medal	Tong Wen	China
silver medal	Dorjgotovyn Tserenkhand	Mongolia
bronze medal	Kim Na-young	South Korea
bronze medal	Midori Shintani	Japan

The women's +78 kilograms (heavyweight) competition at the 2006 Asian Games in Doha was held on 2 December at the Qatar SC Indoor Hall.

== Schedule ==
All times are Arabia Standard Time (UTC+03:00)

Date	Time	Event
Saturday, 2 December 2006	14:00	Quarterfinals
Saturday, 2 December 2006	14:00	Repechage final
Saturday, 2 December 2006	14:00	Semifinals
Saturday, 2 December 2006	14:00	Finals

== Results ==
=== Main bracket ===
Quarterfinals		Semifinals		Final
		Mariya Shekerova (UZB)	0000
Tong Wen (CHN)	1001	Tong Wen (CHN)	1000
Gulzhan Issanova (KAZ)	0000			Tong Wen (CHN)	1000
Midori Shintani (JPN)	0000			Dorjgotovyn Tserenkhand (MGL)	0000
Kim Na-young (KOR)	0010	Kim Na-young (KOR)	0001
Ola Diyab (SYR)	0000	Dorjgotovyn Tserenkhand (MGL)	0010
Dorjgotovyn Tserenkhand (MGL)	0200

=== Repechage ===
Repechage final
Midori Shintani (JPN)	0200
Ola Diyab (SYR)	0000

Bronze medal contest
Gulzhan Issanova (KAZ)	0001
Kim Na-young (KOR)	0211
Midori Shintani (JPN)	1020
Mariya Shekerova (UZB)	0000
