= Michela Torrenti =

Italian judoka (born 1977)

Michela Torrenti (born 10 August 1977) is an Italian judoka.

== Achievements ==
Year	Tournament	Place	Weight class
2008	European Championships	5th	Heavyweight (+78 kg)
2007	European Championships	7th	Heavyweight (+78 kg)
