= Angom Anita Chanu =

Indian judoka

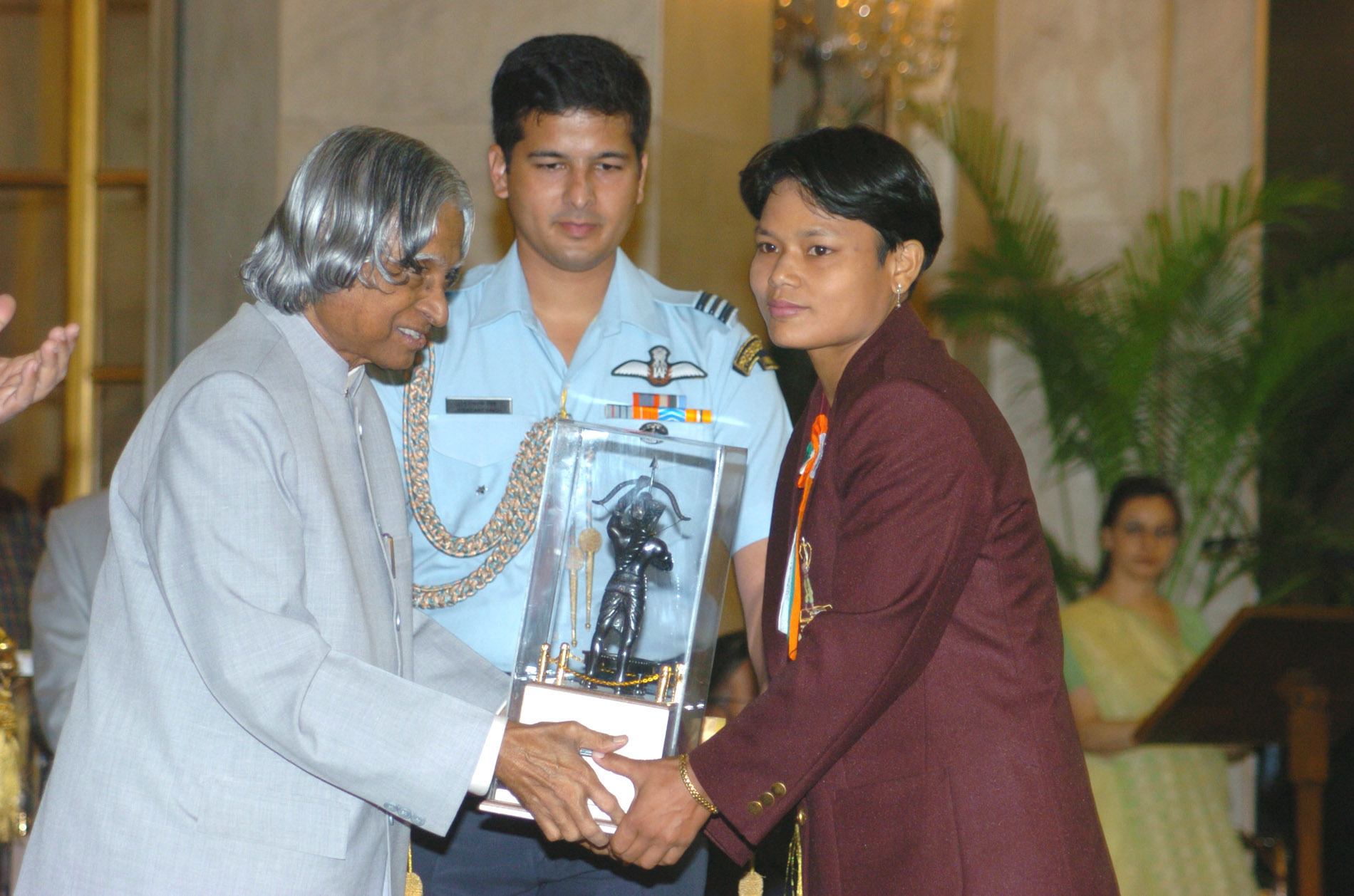
- The President Dr. A.P.J. Abdul Kalam presenting the Arjuna Award for the year 2004 to Ms. Angom Anita Chanu for Judo, at a glittering function in New Delhi on August 29, 2005

Personal information
- Nationality: Indian
- Born: 27 February 1984 (age 42) Mayang, Manipur, India
- Occupation: Judoka
- Weight: 57 kg (126 lb)

Sport
- Country: India
- Sport: Judo
Medal record
Women's judo
Representing India
Asian Judo Championships
Bronze medal – third place	2013 Bangkok	-52 kg

Profile at external databases
- IJF: 2888

Angom Anita Chanu is an Indian judoka, played in the lightweight (-52 kg) in various National and International tournaments.

She won her bronze medal at Asian Judo Championship at Bangkok in 2013 by defeating Kazakhstan’s Olessya Kutsenko.

== Awards ==
Year	National Awards	Ref.
2004	Arjuna Award	
