= Dorjgotovyn Tserenkhand =

Mongolian judoka (born 1977)

Personal information
- Born: 15 April 1977 (age 49) Ulaanbaatar, Mongolia
- Occupation: Judoka

Sport
- Country: Mongolia
- Sport: Judo, Sambo
- Weight class: ‍–‍70 kg, ‍–‍78 kg, +78 kg
- Club: Aldar

Achievements and titles
- Olympic Games: 5th (2008)
- World Champ.: 7th (2003, 2007, 2010, 2010)
- Asian Champ.: (silver) (2000, 2006, 2006, 2007)
Medal record
Women's judo
Representing Mongolia
Asian Games
Silver medal – second place	2006 Doha	+78 kg
Silver medal – second place	2006 Doha	Open
Bronze medal – third place	2010 Guangzhou	Open
Asian Championships
Silver medal – second place	2000 Osaka	‍–‍70 kg
Silver medal – second place	2007 Kuwait City	+78 kg
Bronze medal – third place	2003 Jeju	‍–‍78 kg
Bronze medal – third place	2008 Jeju	+78 kg
Bronze medal – third place	2008 Jeju	Open
Bronze medal – third place	2011 Abu Dhabi	+78 kg
East Asian Games
Bronze medal – third place	1997 Busan	‍–‍72 kg
East Asian Championships
Silver medal – second place	2006 Ulaanbaatar	+78 kg
Women's Sambo
World Championships
Silver medal – second place	2007 Prague	+80 kg

Profile at external databases
- IJF: 2731
- JudoInside.com: 10157
- Updated on 3 July 2025

Dorjgotovyn Tserenkhand (Mongolian: Доржготовын Цэрэнханд) is a Mongolian retired judoka. She won a silver medal at the +78 kg category of the 2006 Asian Games. She competed at both the 2000 and 2008 Olympics. In 2008, she finished tied for 5th.
