= Gulzhan Issanova =

Kazakhstani judoka (born 1983)

Personal information
- Born: 12 September 1983 (age 43)
- Occupation: Judoka

Sport
- Country: Kazakhstan
- Sport: Judo
- Weight class: +78 kg

Achievements and titles
- Olympic Games: 7th (2012)
- World Champ.: R16 (2005, 2005, 2007, 2007, 2010, 2011, 2013, 2017)
- Asian Champ.: (gold) (2009)
Medal record
Women's judo
Representing Kazakhstan
Asian Games
Bronze medal – third place	2006 Doha	Open
Bronze medal – third place	2010 Guangzhou	+78 kg
Bronze medal – third place	2018 Jakarta	+78 kg
Asian Championships
Gold medal – first place	2009 Taipei	+78 kg
Silver medal – second place	2012 Tashkent	+78 kg
Silver medal – second place	2016 Tashkent	+78 kg
Bronze medal – third place	2007 Kuwait City	Open
Bronze medal – third place	2008 Jeju	+78 kg
Bronze medal – third place	2011 Abu Dhabi	+78 kg
Bronze medal – third place	2015 Kuwait	+78 kg
Bronze medal – third place	2017 Hong Kong	+78 kg
World Masters
Bronze medal – third place	2012 Almaty	+78 kg
IJF Grand Prix
Gold medal – first place	2013 Almaty	+78 kg
Gold medal – first place	2013 Tashkent	+78 kg
Gold medal – first place	2016 Tashkent	+78 kg
Silver medal – second place	2017 Tashkent	+78 kg
Bronze medal – third place	2009 Hamburg	+78 kg
Summer Universiade
Bronze medal – third place	2009 Belgrade	+78 kg

Profile at external databases
- IJF: 451
- JudoInside.com: 39915
- Updated on 20 November 2022

Gulzhan Issanova (born 12 September 1983) is a Kazakhstani judoka, born in Karaganda.

Issanova won a bronze medal in the open weight class at the 2006 Asian Games, having defeated Angom Anita Chanu of India in the bronze medal match. She also finished fifth in the heavyweight (+78 kg) category.
