= Jia Yunbing =

Chinese judoka

Personal information
- Born: 24 June 1981 (age 44)
- Occupation: Judoka

Sport
- Sport: Judo

Profile at external databases
- JudoInside.com: 10412

Jia Yunbing (born 24 June 1981) is a Chinese former judoka who competed in the 2000 Summer Olympics.
