= Qin Qian =

Chinese judoka (born 1987)

Personal information
- Born: 7 December 1987 (age 38)
- Occupation: Judoka

Sport
- Country: China
- Sport: Judo
- Weight class: +78 kg

Achievements and titles
- World Champ.: (silver) (2010, 2010, 2011)
- Asian Champ.: (gold) (2012)
Medal record
Women's judo
Representing China
World Championships
Silver medal – second place	2010 Tokyo	+78 kg
Silver medal – second place	2010 Tokyo	Open
Silver medal – second place	2011 Paris	+78 kg
Asian Games
Silver medal – second place	2010 Guangzhou	+78 kg
Asian Championships
Gold medal – first place	2012 Tashkent	+78 kg
World Masters
Gold medal – first place	2010 Suwon	+78 kg
Gold medal – first place	2012 Almaty	+78 kg
IJF Grand Slam
Bronze medal – third place	2010 Moscow	+78 kg
Bronze medal – third place	2013 Tokyo	+78 kg
Bronze medal – third place	2014 Tyumen	+78 kg
IJF Grand Prix
Gold medal – first place	2009 Abu Dhabi	+78 kg
Gold medal – first place	2009 Qingdao	+78 kg
Gold medal – first place	2013 Qingdao	+78 kg
Gold medal – first place	2015 Ulaanbaatar	+78 kg
Silver medal – second place	2011 Amsterdam	+78 kg
Silver medal – second place	2011 Qingdao	+78 kg
Silver medal – second place	2012 Qingdao	+78 kg
Bronze medal – third place	2010 Qingdao	+78 kg
Bronze medal – third place	2011 Düsseldorf	+78 kg
Bronze medal – third place	2014 Qingdao	+78 kg
World Juniors Championships
Gold medal – first place	2006 Santo Domingo	+78 kg
Summer Universiade
Gold medal – first place	2009 Belgrade	+78 kg
Gold medal – first place	2011 Shenzhen	+78 kg

Profile at external databases
- IJF: 1799
- JudoInside.com: 52785
- Updated on 17 July 2023

Qin Qian (born 7 December 1987) is a Chinese judoka who competed at the 2011 World Judo Championships.
