= 2010 World Judo Championships =

Judo competition

Judo 2010 World Judo Championships
- Venue: Yoyogi National Gymnasium
- Location: Tokyo, Japan
- Dates: 9–13 September
- Competitors: 847 from 112 nations
- Website: Official website

Competition at external databases
- Links: IJF • EJU • JudoInside

The 2010 World Judo Championships were held at the Yoyogi National Gymnasium in Tokyo, Japan from 9 to 13 September.

== Schedule ==
Event date	Starting time	Event details
9 September	17:00	Men +100 kg
9 September	17:00	Men -100 kg
9 September	17:00	Women +78 kg
9 September	17:00	Women -78 kg
10 September	17:00	Men -90 kg
10 September	17:00	Men -81 kg
10 September	17:00	Women -70 kg
11 September	17:00	Men -73 kg
11 September	17:00	Women -63 kg
11 September	17:00	Women -57 kg
12 September	17:00	Men -66 kg
12 September	17:00	Men -60 kg
12 September	17:00	Women -52 kg
12 September	17:00	Women -48 kg
13 September	17:00	Open Categories Men & Women

== Medal summary ==
=== Men's events ===
Event	Gold	Silver	Bronze
Extra-lightweight (60 kg)	Rishod Sobirov (UZB)	Georgii Zantaraia (UKR)	Arsen Galstyan (RUS)
Extra-lightweight (60 kg)	Rishod Sobirov (UZB)	Georgii Zantaraia (UKR)	Hiroaki Hiraoka (JPN)
Half-lightweight (66 kg)	Junpei Morishita (JPN)	Leandro Cunha (BRA)	Khashbaataryn Tsagaanbaatar (MGL)
Half-lightweight (66 kg)	Junpei Morishita (JPN)	Leandro Cunha (BRA)	Loic Korval (FRA)
Lightweight (73 kg)	Hiroyuki Akimoto (JPN)	Dex Elmont (NED)	Wang Ki-chun (KOR)
Lightweight (73 kg)	Hiroyuki Akimoto (JPN)	Dex Elmont (NED)	Yasuhiro Awano (JPN)
Half-middleweight (81 kg)	Kim Jae-Bum (KOR)	Leandro Guilheiro (BRA)	Masahiro Takamatsu (JPN)
Half-middleweight (81 kg)	Kim Jae-Bum (KOR)	Leandro Guilheiro (BRA)	Euan Burton (GBR)
Middleweight (90 kg)	Ilias Iliadis (GRE)	Daiki Nishiyama (JPN)	Elkhan Mammadov (AZE)
Middleweight (90 kg)	Ilias Iliadis (GRE)	Daiki Nishiyama (JPN)	Kirill Denisov (RUS)
Half-heavyweight (100 kg)	Takamasa Anai (JPN)	Henk Grol (NED)	Oreidis Despaigne (CUB)
Half-heavyweight (100 kg)	Takamasa Anai (JPN)	Henk Grol (NED)	Thierry Fabre (FRA)
Heavyweight (+100 kg)	Teddy Riner (FRA)	Andreas Tölzer (GER)	Matthieu Bataille (FRA)
Heavyweight (+100 kg)	Teddy Riner (FRA)	Andreas Tölzer (GER)	Islam El Shehaby (EGY)
Openweight	Daiki Kamikawa (JPN)	Teddy Riner (FRA)	Keiji Suzuki (JPN)
Openweight	Daiki Kamikawa (JPN)	Teddy Riner (FRA)	Hiroki Tachiyama (JPN)

=== Women's events ===
Event	Gold	Silver	Bronze
Extra-lightweight (48 kg)	Haruna Asami (JPN)	Tomoko Fukumi (JPN)	Alina Dumitru (ROU)
Extra-lightweight (48 kg)	Haruna Asami (JPN)	Tomoko Fukumi (JPN)	Sarah Menezes (BRA)
Half-lightweight (52 kg)	Yuka Nishida (JPN)	Misato Nakamura (JPN)	Natalia Kuzyutina (RUS)
Half-lightweight (52 kg)	Yuka Nishida (JPN)	Misato Nakamura (JPN)	Mönkhbaataryn Bundmaa (MGL)
Lightweight (57 kg)	Kaori Matsumoto (JPN)	Telma Monteiro (POR)	Sabrina Filzmoser (AUT)
Lightweight (57 kg)	Kaori Matsumoto (JPN)	Telma Monteiro (POR)	Ioulietta Boukouvala (GRE)
Half-middleweight (63 kg)	Yoshie Ueno (JPN)	Miki Tanaka (JPN)	Yaritza Abel (CUB)
Half-middleweight (63 kg)	Yoshie Ueno (JPN)	Miki Tanaka (JPN)	Ramila Yusubova (AZE)
Middleweight (70 kg)	Lucie Décosse (FRA)	Anett Meszaros (HUN)	Yoriko Kunihara (JPN)
Middleweight (70 kg)	Lucie Décosse (FRA)	Anett Meszaros (HUN)	Raša Sraka (SLO)
Half-heavyweight (78 kg)	Kayla Harrison (USA)	Mayra Aguiar (BRA)	Akari Ogata (JPN)
Half-heavyweight (78 kg)	Kayla Harrison (USA)	Mayra Aguiar (BRA)	Yang Xiuli (CHN)
Heavyweight (+78 kg)	Mika Sugimoto (JPN)	Qin Qian (CHN)	Idalys Ortiz (CUB)
Heavyweight (+78 kg)	Mika Sugimoto (JPN)	Qin Qian (CHN)	Maki Tsukada (JPN)
Openweight	Mika Sugimoto (JPN)	Qin Qian (CHN)	Tea Donguzashvili (RUS)
Openweight	Mika Sugimoto (JPN)	Qin Qian (CHN)	Megumi Tachimoto (JPN)

=== Medal table ===
* Host nation (Japan)

Rank	Nation	Gold	Silver	Bronze	Total
1	Japan (JPN)*	10	4	9	23
2	France (FRA)	2	1	3	6
3	Greece (GRE)	1	0	1	2
3	South Korea (KOR)	1	0	1	2
5	United States (USA)	1	0	0	1
5	Uzbekistan (UZB)	1	0	0	1
7	Brazil (BRA)	0	3	1	4
8	China (CHN)	0	2	1	3
9	Netherlands (NED)	0	2	0	2
10	Germany (GER)	0	1	0	1
10	Hungary (HUN)	0	1	0	1
10	Portugal (POR)	0	1	0	1
10	Ukraine (UKR)	0	1	0	1
14	Russia (RUS)	0	0	4	4
15	Cuba (CUB)	0	0	3	3
16	Azerbaijan (AZE)	0	0	2	2
16	Mongolia (MGL)	0	0	2	2
18	Austria (AUT)	0	0	1	1
18	Egypt (EGY)	0	0	1	1
18	Great Britain (GBR)	0	0	1	1
18	Romania (ROU)	0	0	1	1
18	Slovenia (SVN)	0	0	1	1
Totals (22 entries)		16	16	32	64
