= Lucija Polavder =

Slovene judoka

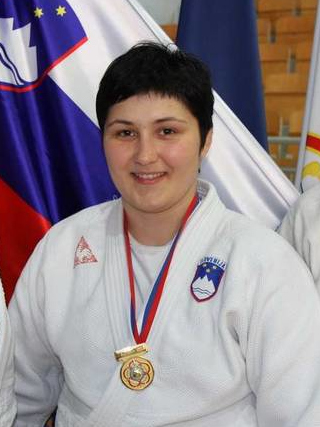

Personal information
- Born: 15 December 1984 (age 41)
- Occupation: Judoka

Sport
- Country: Slovenia
- Sport: Judo
- Weight class: +78 kg

Achievements and titles
- Olympic Games: (bronze) (2008)
- World Champ.: (silver) (2007)
- European Champ.: (gold) (2010, 2013)
Medal record
Women's judo
Representing Slovenia
Olympic Games
Bronze medal – third place	2008 Beijing	+78 kg
World Championships
Silver medal – second place	2007 Rio de Janeiro	Open
European Championships
Gold medal – first place	2010 Vienna	+78 kg
Gold medal – first place	2013 Budapest	+78 kg
Silver medal – second place	2012 Chelyabinsk	+78 kg
Bronze medal – third place	2003 Düsseldorf	Open
Bronze medal – third place	2006 Tampere	+78 kg
Bronze medal – third place	2007 Belgrade	+78 kg
Bronze medal – third place	2008 Lisbon	+78 kg
Bronze medal – third place	2011 Istanbul	+78 kg
World Masters
Bronze medal – third place	2011 Baku	+78 kg
Bronze medal – third place	2013 Tyumen	+78 kg
IJF Grand Slam
Gold medal – first place	2010 Rio de Janeiro	+78 kg
Silver medal – second place	2011 Paris	+78 kg
Bronze medal – third place	2009 Tokyo	+78 kg
Bronze medal – third place	2011 Tokyo	+78 kg
Bronze medal – third place	2014 Paris	+78 kg
IJF Grand Prix
Gold medal – first place	2009 Tunis	+78 kg
Gold medal – first place	2010 Tunis	+78 kg
Gold medal – first place	2012 Düsseldorf	+78 kg
Gold medal – first place	2013 Rijeka	+78 kg
Silver medal – second place	2011 Düsseldorf	+78 kg
Bronze medal – third place	2010 Düsseldorf	+78 kg
Bronze medal – third place	2011 Amsterdam	+78 kg
European Junior Championships
Gold medal – first place	2003 Sarajevo	+78 kg
Bronze medal – third place	2001 Budapest	+78 kg
Mediterranean Games
Gold medal – first place	2009 Pescara	+78 kg
Gold medal – first place	2013 Mersin	+78 kg
Military World Games
Gold medal – first place	2007 Hyderabad	+78 kg
Bronze medal – third place	2011 Rio de Janeiro	+78 kg

Profile at external databases
- IJF: 269
- JudoInside.com: 12615
- Updated on 30 May 2023

Lucija Polavder (born 15 December 1984 in Celje) is a Slovene judoka. Polavder competed at the 2004 Summer Olympics where she didn't advance from the first round. At the 2008 Summer Olympics she advanced to the semifinals, where she was defeated by Japanese Maki Tsukada. In the bronze medal match, Polavder defeated Korean Kim Na-Young and became the second Slovenian judoka to win a medal at the Olympics (after Urška Žolnir in 2004).
