= Tea Donguzashvili =

Russian judoka

Personal information
- Born: 4 June 1976 (age 50)
- Occupation: Judoka

Sport
- Country: Russia
- Sport: Judo
- Weight class: +78 kg

Achievements and titles
- Olympic Games: (bronze) (2004)
- World Champ.: (silver) (2011)
- European Champ.: (gold) (2006)
Medal record
Women's judo
Representing Russia
Olympic Games
Bronze medal – third place	2004 Athens	+78 kg
World Championships
Silver medal – second place	2011 Tyumen	Open
Bronze medal – third place	2003 Osaka	+78 kg
Bronze medal – third place	2010 Tokyo	Open
European Championships
Gold medal – first place	2006 Novi Sad	Open
Silver medal – second place	2001 Paris	+78 kg
Silver medal – second place	2002 Maribor	Open
Silver medal – second place	2003 Düsseldorf	+78 kg
Silver medal – second place	2005 Rotterdam	+78 kg
Silver medal – second place	2005 Moscow	Open
Silver medal – second place	2008 Lisbon	+78 kg
Silver medal – second place	2010 Vienna	+78 kg
Bronze medal – third place	2000 Wrocław	Open
Bronze medal – third place	2007 Belgrade	+78 kg
Bronze medal – third place	2011 Istanbul	+78 kg
IJF Grand Prix
Gold medal – first place	2011 Baku	+78 kg
Bronze medal – third place	2009 Tunis	+78 kg
Summer Universiade
Silver medal – second place	1999 Palma de Mallorca	+78 kg
Bronze medal – third place	2001 Beijing	+78 kg

Profile at external databases
- IJF: 11458
- JudoInside.com: 3324
- Updated on 31 May 2023

Tea Donguzashvili (Russian: Теа Донгузашвили; Georgian: თეა დონღუზაშვილი; born 4 June 1976) is a Russian judoka.

She won a bronze medal in the heavyweight (+78 kg) division at the 2004 Summer Olympics.
