= Tatiana Moskvina =

Belarusian Olympic judoka

Personal information
- Full name: Tatyana Sergeyevna Moskvina
- Born: 10 January 1973 (age 53) Novosibirsk, Russian SFSR, Soviet Union
- Home town: Minsk, Belarus
- Occupation: Judoka
- Height: 1.54 m (5 ft 1 in)

Sport
- Country: Belarus
- Sport: Judo
- Weight class: ‍–‍48 kg
- Club: Dinamo Minsk
- Coached by: Magomed Ramazanov

Achievements and titles
- Olympic Games: 7th (1996)
- World Champ.: 7th (1995, 1997, 2007)
- European Champ.: (silver) (2002, 2004)
Medal record
Women's judo
Representing Belarus
European Championships
Silver medal – second place	2002 Maribor	‍–‍48 kg
Silver medal – second place	2004 Bucharest	‍–‍48 kg
Bronze medal – third place	1997 Oostende	‍–‍48 kg
Bronze medal – third place	2003 Düsseldorf	‍–‍48 kg
Bronze medal – third place	2005 Rotterdam	‍–‍48 kg

Profile at external databases
- IJF: 52918
- JudoInside.com: 3370
- Updated on 17 November 2022

Tatyana Sergeyevna Moskvina (also Tatsiana Siarheievna Maskvina, Belarusian: Таццяна Сяргееўна Масквіна; born 10 January 1973 in Novosibirsk) is a Russian-born Belarusian judoka, who competed in the women's extra-lightweight category. Holding a dual citizenship to compete internationally, Moskvina held the 2003 Belarusian senior title in her own division, picked up a total of seventeen medals in her career, including four from the European Championships, and represented her naturalized nation Belarus in two editions of the Olympic Games (1996 and 2004). Currently a permanent resident in Minsk and a naturalized Belarusian citizen, Moskvina trained under head coach and sensei Magomed Ramazanov for Dinamo.

Moskvina made her official debut at the 1996 Summer Olympics in Atlanta, where she competed in the women's extra-lightweight class (48 kg). She fell in a bodily shattering ippon defeat to Japanese judoka and reigning Olympic champion Ryoko Tamura during their opening match, but redeemed her chance for an Olympic medal by thwarting Honduras' Dora Maldonado and Italy's Giovanna Tortora in the repechage. Fighting against Algeria's Salima Souakri for a spot in the bronze medal final, Moskvina conceded with a chui penalty and a false attack, and lost the match by points and caution.

Despite missing out the 2000 Summer Olympics in Sydney due to sustained injuries, Moskvina reached the pinnacle of her judo career by picking up two career medals at the European Championships in 2002 and 2003. The following year, she sought bid for her second Olympic stint with a sterling silver in the 48-kg division at the same tournament in Bucharest, losing the final match to Romania's Alina Dumitru by an ippon.

At the 2004 Summer Olympics in Athens, Moskvina qualified for her second Belarusian squad, as a 31-year-old veteran and a lone female judoka, in the women's extra-lightweight class (48 kg), by placing second and receiving a berth from the A-Tournament in Tallinn, Estonia. She opened her match with a swift exit from French judoka and eventual silver medalist Frédérique Jossinet, who scored an effortless, fifteen-second ippon victory and pulverized her into the tatami with a sukui nage (scoop throw). In the repechage, Moskvina gained control to pin Australia's Sonya Chervonsky on the mat within a full minute, before succumbed to a waza-ari awasete ippon hold from China's Gao Feng in her subsequent match.
