= Maksym Korotun =

Ukrainian judoka (born 1985)

Personal information
- Born: 1 March 1985 (age 41) Kramatorsk, Donetsk Oblast, Ukrainian SSR, Soviet Union
- Occupation: Judoka
- Height: 1.69 m (5 ft 6 1/2 in)

Sport
- Country: Ukraine
- Sport: Judo
- Weight class: –60 kg
- Club: Kolos Donetsk (UKR)

Achievements and titles
- Olympic Games: R64 (2008)
- World Champ.: 13th (2005)
- European Champ.: 9th (2007)
Medal record
Men's judo
European U23 Championships
| Silver medal – second place | 2005 Kyiv | –60 kg |
Summer Universiade
| Silver medal – second place | 2007 Bangkok | –60 kg |

Profile at external databases
- IJF: 2522
- JudoInside.com: 32339
- Updated on 11 February 2022

Maksym Korotun (Ukrainian: Максим Коротун; born March 1, 1985, in Kramatorsk, Donetsk Oblast) is a Ukrainian judoka, who competed for the extra-lightweight category at the 2008 Summer Olympics in Beijing. He won a silver medal at the 2007 Summer Universiade in Bangkok, Thailand, losing out to South Korea's Cho Nam-Suk in the final match.

At the 2008 Summer Olympics, Korotun was eliminated in the first preliminary round of men's 60 kg class. He was defeated by Brazil's Denílson Lourenço, who scored an automatic ippon to end a match before the four-minute count.
