= Ye Gue-rin =

South Korean judoka

Personal information
- Full name: Ye Gue-rin
- Nationality: South Korea
- Born: 16 October 1981 (age 44) Seoul, South Korea
- Height: 1.58 m (5 ft 2 in)
- Weight: 48 kg (106 lb)

Korean name
- Hangul: 예그린
- RR: Ye Geurin
- MR: Ye Kŭrin

Sport
- Sport: Judo
- Event: 48 kg

Ye Gue-rin (Korean: 예그린; born October 16, 1981, in Seoul) is a South Korean judoka, who competed in the women's extra-lightweight category. She finished seventh in the 48-kg division at the 2004 Summer Olympics, and also picked up a bronze at the 2008 East Asian Judo Championships in Taipei, Taiwan.

Ye qualified for the South Korean squad in the women's extra-lightweight class (48 kg) at the 2004 Summer Olympics in Athens, by placing fifth and receiving a berth from the Asian Championships in Almaty, Kazakhstan. She opened her match with a more convincing victory by points over Turkish judoka and two-time Olympian Neşe Şensoy Yıldız, before losing in an earth-shattering ippon to Germany's Julia Matijass during the quarterfinals. After her striking defeat, Ye's coach Suh Joung-buk apparently hit one of the athletes with a punch inside the judo hall, resulting the coach to be sent home from the Games in disgrace. In the repechage, Ye redeemed her chance from an incident for an Olympic bronze medal by thwarting Canada's Carolyne Lepage in their first playoff, but came up short with a tani otoshi throw and a score 2–1 on koka against China's Gao Feng, relegating Ye to the seventh position.
