= Judo at the 2004 Summer Olympics – Women's 48 kg =

Women's 48 kg at the Games of the XXVIII Olympiad
- Venue: Ano Liossia Olympic Hall
- Dates: 14 August 2004
- Competitors: 22 from 22 nations
- Winning score: 0112

Medalists
1st place, gold medalist(s)		Ryoko Tani	Japan
2nd place, silver medalist(s)		Frédérique Jossinet	France
3rd place, bronze medalist(s)		Gao Feng	China
3rd place, bronze medalist(s)		Julia Matijass	Germany

Women's 48 kg competition in judo at the 2004 Summer Olympics was held on August 14 at the Ano Liossia Olympic Hall.

This event was the lightest of the women's judo weight classes, limiting competitors to a maximum of 48 kilograms of body mass. Like all other judo events, bouts lasted five minutes. If the bout was still tied at the end, it was extended for another five-minute, sudden-death period; if neither judoka scored during that period, the match is decided by the judges. The tournament bracket consisted of a single-elimination contest culminating in a gold medal match. There was also a repechage to determine the winners of the two bronze medals. Each judoka who had lost to a semifinalist competed in the repechage. The two judokas who lost in the semifinals faced the winner of the opposite half of the bracket's repechage in bronze medal bouts.

== Schedule ==
All times are Greece Standard Time (UTC+2)

Date	Time	Round
Saturday, 14 August 2004	10:30; 13:00; 17:00	Preliminaries; Repechage; Final

== Qualifying athletes ==
Mat	Athlete	Country
1	Hanatou Ouelogo	Burkina Faso
1	Lyubov Bruletova	Russia
1	Anna Żemła-Krajewska	Poland
1	Lisseth Orozco	Colombia
1	Tatyana Shishkina	Kazakhstan
1	Alina Dumitru	Romania
1	Bertille Ali	Central African Republic
1	Soraya Haddad	Algeria
1	Yamila Zambrano	Cuba
1	Ryoko Tani	Japan
1	Maria Karagiannopoulou	Greece
2	Daniela Polzin	Brazil
2	Gao Feng	China
2	Giuseppina Macrì	Italy
2	Tatiana Moskvina	Belarus
2	Frédérique Jossinet	France
2	Sonya Chervonsky	Australia
2	Julia Matijass	Germany
2	Carolyne Lepage	Canada
2	Neşe Şensoy Yıldız	Turkey
2	Ri Kyong-ok	North Korea
2	Ye Gue-rin	South Korea

== Tournament results ==
=== Final ===
Final
1	Ryoko Tani (JPN)	0112
2	Frédérique Jossinet (FRA)	0001

=== Mat 1 ===
Round of 32
Hanatou Ouelogo (BUR)	0000
Lyubov Bruletova (RUS)	0201
Lisseth Orozco (COL)	0011
Tatyana Shishkina (KAZ)	0012
Bertille Ali (CAF)	0000
Soraya Haddad (ALG)	1110

Round of 16
Lyubov Bruletova (RUS)	0000
Anna Żemła-Krajewska (POL)	1000
Tatyana Shishkina (KAZ)	0000
Alina Dumitru (ROU)	1011
Soraya Haddad (ALG)	1000
Yamila Zambrano (CUB)	0000
Ryoko Tani (JPN)	0220
Maria Karagiannopoulou (GRE)	0001

Quarterfinals
Anna Żemła-Krajewska (POL)	0000
Alina Dumitru (ROU)	1000
Soraya Haddad (ALG)	0001
Ryoko Tani (JPN)	1011

Semifinals
Alina Dumitru (ROU)	0001
Ryoko Tani (JPN)	0211

=== Mat 2 ===
Round of 32
Daniela Polzin (BRA)	0000
Gao Feng (CHN)	1110
Frédérique Jossinet (FRA)	0200
Sonya Chervonsky (AUS)	0000
Neşe Şensoy Yıldız (TUR)	0111
Ri Kyong-ok (PRK)	0021

Round of 16
Gao Feng (CHN)	1011
Giuseppina Macrì (ITA)	0000
Tatiana Moskvina (BLR)	0000
Frédérique Jossinet (FRA)	1000
Julia Matijass (GER)	1100
Carolyne Lepage (CAN)	0000
Neşe Şensoy Yıldız (TUR)	0001
Ye Gue-rin (KOR)	0010

Quarterfinals
Gao Feng (CHN)	0011
Frédérique Jossinet (FRA)	0102
Julia Matijass (GER)	1000
Ye Gue-rin (KOR)	0000

Semifinals
Frédérique Jossinet (FRA)	1000
Julia Matijass (GER)	0000

=== Repechage ===
Those judoka eliminated in earlier rounds by the four semifinalists of the main bracket advanced to the repechage. These matches determined the two bronze medalists for the event.

First round
Sonya Chervonsky (AUS)	0000
Tatiana Moskvina (BLR)	1000

Second round
Tatyana Shishkina (KAZ)	0000
Anna Żemła-Krajewska (POL)	0100
Maria Karagiannopoulou (GRE)	1001
Soraya Haddad (ALG)	0000
Tatiana Moskvina (BLR)	0000
Gao Feng (CHN)	0200
Carolyne Lepage (CAN)	0000
Ye Gue-rin (KOR)	0011

Third round
Anna Żemła-Krajewska (POL)	0000
Maria Karagiannopoulou (GRE)	1001
Gao Feng (CHN)	0002
Ye Gue-rin (KOR)	0001

Bronze medal finals
Maria Karagiannopoulou (GRE)	0000
Julia Matijass (GER)	1000
Gao Feng (CHN)	1010
Alina Dumitru (ROU)	0110
