= Radmila Perišić =

Serbian judoka

Personal information
- Born: 24 April 1980 (age 46)
- Occupation: Judoka

Sport
- Country: Serbia
- Sport: Judo
- Weight class: ‍–‍57 kg

Achievements and titles
- World Champ.: R16 (2005)
- European Champ.: 5th (2006, 2008)

Profile at external databases
- IJF: 58824
- JudoInside.com: 33493
- Updated on 23 October 2023

Radmila Perišić (born on 24 April 1980, in Novi Sad, Serbia) is a Serbian judoka.

== Achievements ==
Year	Tournament	Place	Weight class
2008	European Championships	5th	Lightweight (+57 kg)
2006	European Open Championships	5th	Open class
