= Lavrentios Alexanidis =

Greek judoka (born 1978)

Personal information
- Born: 10 March 1978 (age 48)
- Occupation: Judoka

Sport
- Country: Greece
- Sport: Judo
- Weight class: –60 kg, –66 kg, –73 kg
- Rank: 5th dan black belt

Achievements and titles
- Olympic Games: 13th (2004, 2008)
- World Champ.: R32 (2001, 2005, 2007, 2009)
- European Champ.: (bronze) (2005, 2008)
Medal record
Men's judo
Representing Greece
European Championships
Bronze medal – third place	2005 Rotterdam	–60 kg
Bronze medal – third place	2008 Lisbon	–60 kg

Profile at external databases
- IJF: 835
- JudoInside.com: 12287
- Updated on 16 November 2022

Lavrentios Alexanidis (Greek: Λαυρέντιος Αλεξανίδης, born 11 September 1978 in Kvemo Kenti, Georgia) is a Greek judoka.

== Achievements ==
Year	Tournament	Place	Weight class
2008	European Championships	3rd	Extra lightweight (60 kg)
2005	European Judo Championships	3rd	Extra lightweight (60 kg)
2002	European Judo Championships	7th	Half lightweight (66 kg)
2001	European Judo Championships	5th	Extra lightweight (60 kg)
