= Daniel Fernández =

Daniel Fernández or Fernandez may refer to:

== Sports and games ==
=== Association football ===
- Daniel Fernández (football manager, born 1963), Argentine football coach and player
- Daniel Fernández (football manager, born 1973), Uruguayan football manager
- Daniel Fernández (footballer, born 1978), Argentine footballer
- Dani Fernández (footballer, born 1983), Spanish footballer
- Dani Fernández (footballer, born 1987), Spanish footballer
- Dani Fernández (footballer, born 1993), Spanish football manager and player
- Dani Fernández (footballer, born 1997), Spanish footballer
- Dani Fernández (footballer, born 2008), Spanish footballer

=== Other sports and games ===
- Daniel Fernández (baseball) (born 1965), Mexican baseball player and manager
- Daniel Fernandez (American chess player) (born 1985), American chess grandmaster
- Daniel Fernandez (English chess player) (born 1995), English chess grandmaster
- Daniel Fernández (handballer) (born 2001), Spanish handball player
- Daniel Fernández (judoka) (born 1985), Belgian judoka

== Others ==
- Daniel Fernández Crespo (1901–1964), Uruguayan politician
- Daniel D. Fernández (1944–1966), American soldier and Medal of Honor recipient
- Daniel Fernández Torres (born 1964), Puerto Rican bishop
- Dan Fernandez (born 1966), Filipino actor and politician
- Daniel Fernandez (Uruguayan Air Force Flight 571) (fl. 1972), survivor of the crash which inspired the film Alive
- Daniel Fernández del Castaño (born 1979), Argentine model and actor
- Dani Fernández (singer) (born 1991), Spanish singer, former member of Spanish boy band Auryn

== See also ==
- Danilo Fernandez (born 1958), Filipino politician
- Danny Fernandes (born 1985), Canadian singer of Portuguese descent
- Daniel Fernandes (disambiguation)
