= Boris Novotný =

Slovak judoka

Personal information
- Born: 23 July 1976 (age 50)
- Occupation: Judoka

Sport
- Country: Slovakia
- Sport: Judo
- Weight class: –81 kg

Achievements and titles
- World Champ.: R32 (2005)
- European Champ.: (silver) (2005)
Medal record
Men's judo
Representing Slovakia
European Championships
Silver medal – second place	2005 Rotterdam	–81 kg

Profile at external databases
- IJF: 1289
- JudoInside.com: 7508
- Updated on 17 November 2022

Boris Novotný (born 23 July 1976) is a Slovak judoka.

== Achievements ==
Year	Tournament	Place	Weight class
2005	European Judo Championships	2nd	Half middleweight (81 kg)
