= Kim Kyong-jin =

North Korean judoka (born 1986)

Kim Kyong-Jin
Personal information
- Native name: 김경진
- Nationality: North Korea
- Born: 25 February 1986 (age 40)
- Height: 1.57 m (5 ft 2 in)
- Weight: 64 kg (141 lb)

Sport
- Sport: Judo
- Event: 60 kg
Medal record
Men's judo
Representing North Korea
Asian Championships
Silver medal – second place	2009 Taipei	60 kg
Bronze medal – third place	2008 Jeju City	60 kg
East Asian Games
Gold medal – first place	2009 Hong Kong	60 kg

Kim Kyong-jin (Korean: 김경진; born February 25, 1986) is a North Korean judoka, who played for the extra-lightweight category. He won two medals, silver and bronze, for the 60 kg division at the Asian Judo Championships (2008 in Jeju City, South Korea and 2009 in Taipei, Taiwan).

Kim represented North Korea at the 2008 Summer Olympics in Beijing, where he competed for the men's extra-lightweight class (60 kg). He defeated Madagascar's Elie Norbert and Armenia's Hovhannes Davtyan in the preliminary rounds, before losing out the quarterfinal match, by two yuko and a kata gatame (shoulder hold), to Austria's Ludwig Paischer. Because his opponent advanced further into the final match, Kim offered another shot for the bronze medal by entering the repechage rounds. Unfortunately, he finished only in ninth place, after losing out the second repechage bout to Great Britain's Craig Fallon, who successfully scored a waza-ari (half-point) and a kuchiki taoshi (single leg takedown), at the end of the five-minute period.

It is believed that Kim is an illegitimate son of North Korea's founder, Kim Il Sung, and his then-mistress Kim Ok, who was a musician at the time of his birth. Kim Ok would later serve as secretary and mistress to Kim Il Sung's son, Kim Jong Il.
