= Javier Fernández (judoka) =

Spanish judoka (born 1981)

Personal information
- Born: 10 August 1981 (age 45)
- Occupation: Judoka

Sport
- Country: Spain
- Sport: Judo
- Weight class: –60 kg

Achievements and titles
- World Champ.: R64 (2005)
- European Champ.: 7th (2005)
Medal record
Men's judo
Representing Spain
World Juniors Championships
Bronze medal – third place	2000 Nabeul	–60 kg
European Junior Championships
Bronze medal – third place	1999 Rome	–60 kg

Profile at external databases
- IJF: 5698
- JudoInside.com: 6693
- Updated on 23 February 2022

Javier Fernández (born 10 August 1981) is a Spanish judoka.

== Achievements ==
Year	Tournament	Place	Weight Class
2005	European Judo Championships	7th	Extra lightweight (60 kg)
2005	Mediterranean Games	3rd	Extra lightweight (60 kg)
