= Christophe Humbert =

French judoka (born 1979)

Personal information
- Born: 26 June 1979 (age 47)
- Occupation: Judoka

Sport
- Country: France
- Sport: Judo
- Weight class: ‍–‍90 kg, ‍–‍100 kg

Achievements and titles
- World Champ.: R16 (2005)
- European Champ.: (gold) (2005)
Medal record
Men's judo
Representing France
European Championships
Gold medal – first place	2005 Rotterdam	‍–‍100 kg

Profile at external databases
- IJF: 2310
- JudoInside.com: 6699
- Updated on 17 November 2022

Christophe Humbert (born 26 June 1979) is a French judoka.

== Achievements ==
Year	Tournament	Place	Weight class
2008	European Championships	5th	Half heavyweight (100 kg)
2005	European Judo Championships	1st	Half heavyweight (100 kg)
