= Neşe Şensoy Yıldız =

Turkish judoka (born 1974)

Personal information
- Born: 10 June 1974 (age 52) Istanbul, Turkey
- Occupation: Judoka
- Height: 1.56 m (5 ft 1 in)

Sport
- Country: Turkey
- Sport: Judo
- Weight class: ‍–‍48 kg
- Club: Ordu Judo Ihtisas Club
- Coached by: Haldun Efemgil

Achievements and titles
- Olympic Games: R16 (2000, 2004)
- World Champ.: (bronze) (2003)
- European Champ.: (silver) (2006)
Medal record
Women's judo
Representing Turkey
World Championships
Bronze medal – third place	2003 Osaka	‍–‍48 kg
European Championships
Silver medal – second place	2006 Tampere	‍–‍48 kg
Bronze medal – third place	2005 Rotterdam	‍–‍48 kg
Mediterranean Games
Gold medal – first place	2001 Tunis	‍–‍48 kg
Bronze medal – third place	2005 Almería	‍–‍48 kg

Profile at external databases
- IJF: 52932
- JudoInside.com: 7529
- Updated on 17 November 2022

Neşe Şensoy Yıldız (born 10 June 1974 in Istanbul) is a Turkish judoka, who competed in the women's extra-lightweight category. She held two Turkish senior titles in her own division, and picked up a total of twenty medals in her career, including a gold from the 2001 Mediterranean Games in Tunis, Tunisia, a silver from the 2006 European Judo Championships in Tampere, Finland, and a bronze from the 2003 World Judo Championships in Osaka, Japan. Yildiz represented her nation Turkey in two editions of the Olympic Games (2000 and 2004), where she failed to reach the quarterfinals in the 48-kg division. Throughout most of her sporting career, Yildiz trained for Ordu Judo Ihtisas Club in her native Istanbul under head coach and sensei Haldun Efemgil.

Yildiz made her official debut at the 2000 Summer Olympics in Sydney, where she competed in the women's extra-lightweight class (48 kg). She received a bye in the first round, but succumbed her opening match to Ukraine's Lyudmyla Lusnikova upon the judges' irrevocable decision. In 2001, Yildiz reached the pinnacle of her judo career at the Mediterranean Games, where she became the first female Turkish judoka to capture the gold medal in her sport upon pinning Italy's Giuseppina Macrì in the final match by an ippon score. Two years later, Yildiz shared bronze medals with Cuba's Danieska Carrión in the same division at the 2003 World Judo Championships in Osaka, Japan to guarantee her spot on the Turkish team for her second Olympic stint.

At the 2004 Summer Olympics in Athens, Yildiz qualified as a lone female judoka for her second Turkish squad in the women's extra-lightweight class (48 kg), by placing third and receiving a berth from the World Championships in Osaka, Japan. Yildiz opened her fight with a more convincing victory by a waza-ari score over North Korea's Ri Kyong-ok, before she fell shortly in her next match to South Korea's Ye Gue-rin with a double shido deduction and a non-combative penalty.

Shortly after her second Olympic stint, Yildiz redeemed her strength to pick up two more bronze medals in her career hardware at the 2005 Mediterranean Games in Almería, Spain, and later at the 2005 European Judo Championships in Rotterdam, Netherlands. The following year, Yildiz capped off her judo career with a silver medal in the 48-kg division at the European Championships in Tampere, Finland, losing the final match to Romanian judoka and reigning champion Alina Dumitru.
