= Judo at the 2008 Summer Olympics – Men's 60 kg =

Judo competition

Men's 60 kg at the Games of the XXIX Olympiad
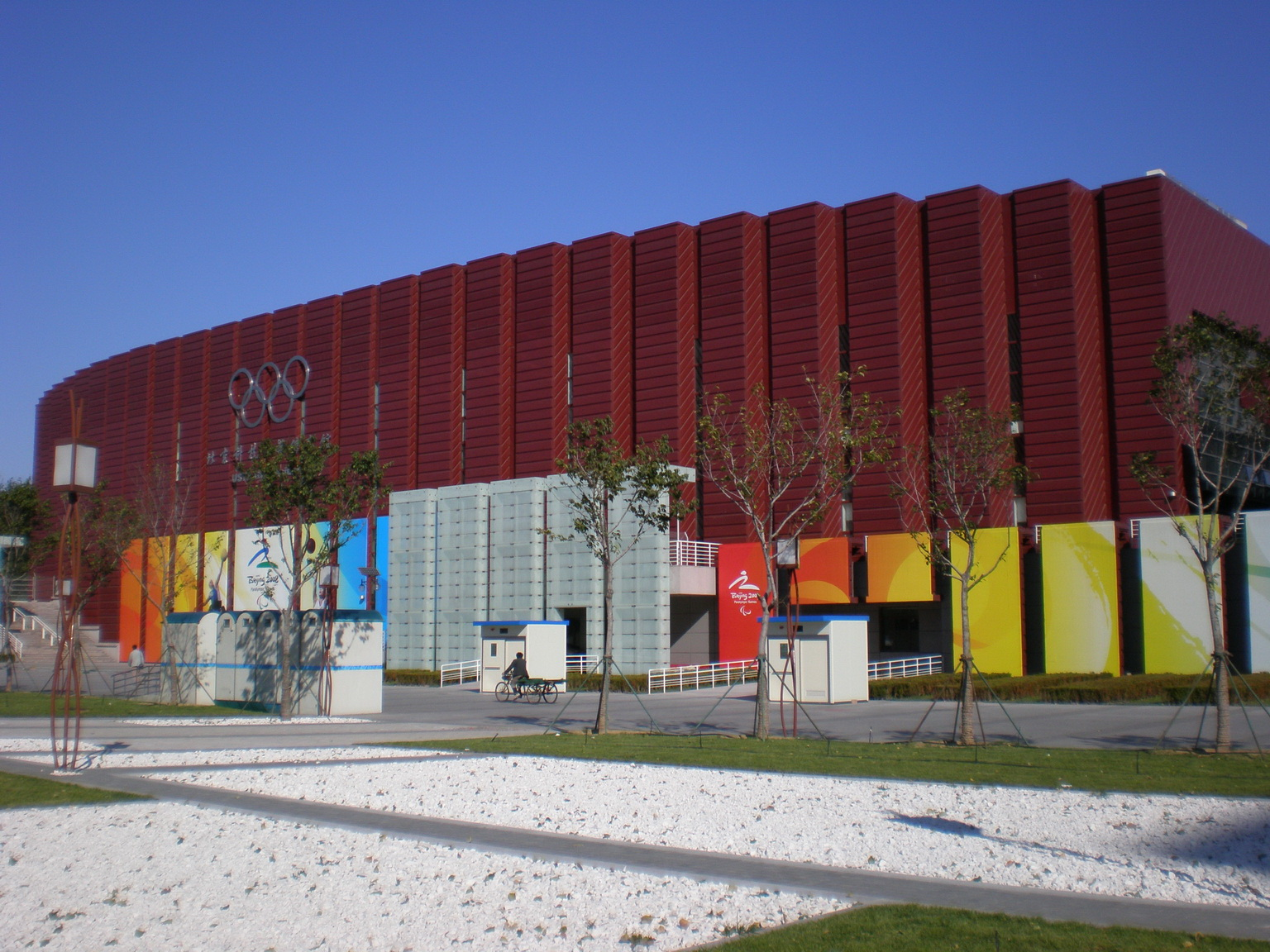
- USTB Gymnasium
- Venue: Beijing Science and Technology University Gymnasium
- Dates: 9 August 2008
- Winning score: 1000

Medalists
1st place, gold medalist(s)		Choi Min-Ho	South Korea
2nd place, silver medalist(s)		Ludwig Paischer	Austria
3rd place, bronze medalist(s)		Rishod Sobirov	Uzbekistan
3rd place, bronze medalist(s)		Ruben Houkes	Netherlands

The Men's 60 kg Judo competition at the 2008 Summer Olympics was held on August 9 at the Beijing Science and Technology University Gymnasium. Preliminary rounds started at 12:00 pm CST. Repechage finals, semifinals, bouts for bronze medals and the final were held at 8:00 pm CST.

This event was the lightest of the men's judo weight classes, limiting competitors to a maximum of 60 kilograms of body mass. Like all other judo events, bouts lasted five minutes. If the bout was still tied at the end, it was extended for another five-minute, sudden-death period; if neither judoka scored during that period, the match is decided by the judges. The tournament bracket consisted of a single-elimination contest culminating in a gold medal match. There was also a repechage to determine the winners of the two bronze medals. Each judoka who had lost to a semifinalist competed in the repechage. The two judokas who lost in the semifinals faced the winner of the opposite half of the bracket's repechage in bronze medal bouts.

== Tournament results ==
=== Final ===
Final
1	Choi Min-Ho (KOR)	1000
2	Ludwig Paischer (AUT)	0000

=== Mat 1 ===
Round of 64
Lourenço (BRA)	1001
Korotun (UKR)	0001

Round of 32
D'Aquino (AUS)	0000
Alexanidis (GRE)	1000
Houkes (NED)	0011
Will (CAN)	0001
Techovas (LTU)	0000
Guédez (VEN)	1000
Hiraoka (JPN)	0000
Williams (USA)	0001
Rebahi (ALG)	0000
Sobirov (UZB)	1001
Petříkov (CZE)	0011
Lourenço (BRA)	0000
Choi (KOR)	1000
Albarracín (ARG)	0000
Drakšič (SLO)	0010
Akhondzadeh (IRI)	0110

Round of 16
Alexanidis (GRE)	0000
Houkes (NED)	0001
Guédez (VEN)	1000
Williams (USA)	0000
Sobirov (UZB)	0001
Petříkov (CZE)	0000
Choi (KOR)	1000
Akhondzadeh (IRI)	0000

Quarterfinals
Houkes (NED)	0010
Guédez (VEN)	0001
Sobirov (UZB)	0000
Choi (KOR)	1001

Semifinals
Houkes (NED)	0000
Choi (KOR)	1000

=== Mat 2 ===
Round of 64

Round of 32
Khousrof (YEM)	0000
Kishmakov (RUS)	0020
Liu (CHN)	0001
Utarbayev (KAZ)	0000
Khergiani (GEO)	0010
Dragin (FRA)	0101
Tsagaanbaatar (MGL)	0000
Yekutiel (ISR)	0001
Norbert (MAD)	0000
Kim (PRK)	1000
Piker (CUB)	0010
Davtyan (ARM)	0100
Paischer (AUT)	1010
Ahamdi (MAR)	0000
Fallon (GBR)	1010
Siccardi (MON)	0000

Round of 16
Kishmakov (RUS)	0100
Liu (CHN)	0000
Dragin (FRA)	1001
Yekutiel (ISR)	0001
Kim (PRK)	0022
Davtyan (ARM)	0000
Paischer (AUT)	0002
Fallon (GBR)	0001

Quarterfinals
Kishmakov (RUS)	0000
Dragin (FRA)	0002
Kim (PRK)	0000
Paischer (AUT)	0020

Semifinals
Dragin (FRA)	0000
Paischer (AUT)	1001

=== Repechage ===
First round
Frazer Will (CAN)	1001
Lavrentios Alexanidis (GRE)	0010
Miguel Albarracín (ARG)	0002
Masoud Haji Akhondzadeh (IRI)	0020
Nestor Khergiani (GEO)	0000
Gal Yekutiel (ISR)	0001
Younes Ahamdi (MAR)	0000
Craig Fallon (GBR)	0011

Second round
Frazer Will (CAN)	1000
Javier Guédez (VEN)	0000
Masoud Haji Akhondzadeh (IRI)	0001
Rishod Sobirov (UZB)	0010
Gal Yekutiel (ISR)	0001
Ruslan Kishmakov (RUS)	0000
Craig Fallon (GBR)	0100
Kim Kyong-Jin (PRK)	0001

Third round
Frazer Will (CAN)	0000
Rishod Sobirov (UZB)	0011
Gal Yekutiel (ISR)	0200
Craig Fallon (GBR)	0101

Bronze medal finals
Dimitri Dragin (FRA)	0000
Rishod Sobirov (UZB)	0001
Ruben Houkes (NED)	1012
Gal Yekutiel (ISR)	0000

== Final ranking ==
Rank	Athlete
Gold medal	Choi Min-Ho (KOR)
Silver medal	Ludwig Paischer (AUT)
Bronze medal	Rishod Sobirov (UZB)
Bronze medal	Ruben Houkes (NED)
5	Dimitri Dragin (FRA)
5	Gal Yekutiel (ISR)
7	Frazer Will (CAN)
7	Craig Fallon (GBR)
