= Sonya Chervonsky =

Australian judoka

Personal information
- Full name: Sonya Chervonsky
- Nationality: Australia
- Born: 15 June 1983 (age 43) Moscow, Russian SFSR, Soviet Union
- Height: 1.61 m (5 ft 3 1/2 in)
- Weight: 48 kg (106 lb)

Sport
- Sport: Judo
- Event: 48 kg
- Club: University of New South Wales
- Coached by: Warren Rosser

Sonya Chervonsky (born 15 June 1983 in Moscow, Russian SFSR) is an Australian judoka, who competed in the women's extra-lightweight category. Chervonsky captured two Australian titles in her own division, picked up a total of eighteen medals in her career, including two golds from the Oceania Championships, and represented Australia at the 2004 Summer Olympics. Until her retirement from the sport in 2012, Chervonsky remained a member of the University of New South Wales' judo squad under head coach and sensei Warren Rosser and high performance coach John Buckley.

Chervonsky qualified for the Australian squad, as a 21-year-old, in the women's extra-lightweight class (48 kg) at the 2004 Summer Olympics in Athens, by topping the field of judoka and receiving a berth from the Oceania Championships in Nouméa, New Caledonia. She lost her opening match to French judoka and eventual silver medalist Frédérique Jossinet, who successfully scored a waza-ari awasete ippon and clutched her on the tatami with a kata gatame (shoulder hold) at one minute and thirty-four seconds. In the repechage, Chervonsky gave herself a chance for an Olympic bronze medal, but slipped it away in a defeat to two-time Olympic judoka Tatiana Moskvina of Belarus by an ippon and a tomoe nage (circle throw) within a minute into their first playoff of the draft.

Chervonsky sought her bid for the 2008 Summer Olympics in Beijing, but failed to forge a slot to the Australian team upon losing the final to Kristie-Anne Ryder in the 52-kg division at the Oceania Championships in Christchurch, New Zealand. Following her retirement from judo in 2012, Chervonsky volunteered as a "big sister" for the Life Changing Experiences Foundation (LCEF), an organization that aims to help hundreds of young women facing devastating issues occurred in the contemporary society. She has since pursued further tertiary studies and works in health.
