= 2005 European Judo Championships =

2005 Judo European Judo Championships
- Venue: Topsportcentrum Rotterdam
- Location: Rotterdam, Netherlands
- Dates: 20–22 May 2005

Competition at external databases
- Links: JudoInside

The 2005 European Judo Championships were the 16th edition of the European Judo Championships, and were held in Rotterdam, Netherlands from 20 May to 22 May 2005.

== Medal overview ==
=== Men ===
Event	Gold	Silver	Bronze
60 kg	(Armenia) Armen Nazaryan	(Austria) Ludwig Paischer	(Greece) Lavrentis Alexanidis (Netherlands) Ruben Houkes
66 kg	(Azerbaijan) Elchin Ismayilov	(Hungary) Miklós Ungvári	(France) Benjamin Darbelet (Belarus) Aliaksandr Shlyk
73 kg	(Hungary) Ákos Braun	(Israel) Yoel Razvozov	(Belgium) Daniel Fernández (Georgia (country)) David Kevkhishvili
81 kg	(Germany) Ole Bischof	(Slovakia) Boris Novotný	(United Kingdom) Euan Burton (Poland) Robert Krawczyk
90 kg	(Spain) David Alarza	(Italy) Roberto Meloni	(Switzerland) Sergei Aschwanden (Netherlands) Mark Huizinga
100 kg	(France) Christophe Humbert	(Israel) Ariel Ze'evi	(Romania) Daniel Brata (Russia) Ruslan Gasimov
+100 kg	(Russia) Alexander Mikhaylin	(Poland) Janusz Wojnarowicz	(Israel) Andrian Kordon (Netherlands) Dennis van der Geest

=== Women ===
Event	Gold	Silver	Bronze
48 kg	(Romania) Alina Alexandra Dumitru	(France) Frédérique Jossinet	(Belarus) Tatiana Moskvina (Turkey) Neşe Şensoy Yıldız
52 kg	(Belgium) Ilse Heylen	(Romania) Ioana Maria Aluaș	(Portugal) Telma Monteiro (Slovenia) Petra Nareks
57 kg	(Russia) Olga Sonina	(United Kingdom) Sophie Cox	(Spain) Isabel Fernández (Austria) Sabrina Filzmoser
63 kg	(Netherlands) Elisabeth Willeboordse	(Austria) Claudia Heill	(France) Lucie Décosse (Germany) Claudia Malzahn
70 kg	(Netherlands) Edith Bosch	(Italy) Ylenia Scapin	(Belgium) Catherine Jacques (Hungary) Anett Mészáros
78 kg	(France) Céline Lebrun	(United Kingdom) Rachel Wilding	(Ukraine) Anastasiia Matrosova (Italy) Lucia Morico
+78 kg	(United Kingdom) Karina Bryant	(Russia) Tea Donguzashvili	(Germany) Katrin Beinroth (Ukraine) Maryna Prokofyeva

=== Medals table ===
Rank	Nation	Gold	Silver	Bronze	Total
1	France	2	1	3	6
2	Russia	2	1	1	4
3	Netherlands	2	0	3	5
4	Great Britain	1	2	1	4
5	Hungary	1	1	1	3
5	Romania	1	1	1	3
7	Germany	1	0	2	3
8	Belgium	1	0	1	2
8	Spain	1	0	1	2
10	Azerbaijan	1	0	0	1
10	Armenia	1	0	0	1
12	Austria	0	2	1	3
12	Israel	0	2	1	3
12	Italy	0	2	1	3
15	Poland	0	1	1	2
16	Slovakia	0	1	0	1
17	Belarus	0	0	2	2
17	Ukraine	0	0	2	2
19	Georgia	0	0	1	1
19	Greece	0	0	1	1
19	Portugal	0	0	1	1
19	Slovenia	0	0	1	1
19	Switzerland	0	0	1	1
19	Turkey	0	0	1	1

== Results overview ==
=== Men ===
==== 60 kg ====
Position	Judoka	Country
1.	Armen Nazaryan	Armenia
2.	Ludwig Paischer	Austria
3.	Laurentis Alexanidis	Greece
3.	Ruben Houkes	Netherlands
5.	Nijat Shikhalizade	Azerbaijan
5.	Cédric Taymans	Belgium
7.	Javier Fernández	Spain
7.	Evgeny Kudyakov	Russia

==== 66 kg ====
Position	Judoka	Country
1.	Elchin Ismayilov	Azerbaijan
2.	Miklós Ungvári	Hungary
3.	Benjamin Darbelet	France
3.	Aliaksandr Shlyk	Belarus
5.	David Margoshvili	Georgia
5.	Marcel Trudov	Moldova
7.	Costel Danculea	Romania
7.	Hüseyin Özkan	Turkey

==== 73 kg ====
Position	Judoka	Country
1.	Ákos Braun	Hungary
2.	Yoel Razvozov	Israel
3.	Daniel Fernández	Belgium
3.	David Kevkhishvili	Georgia
5.	Henry Schoeman	Netherlands
5.	Vsevolods Zeļonijs	Latvia
7.	Sašo Jereb	Slovenia
7.	David Papaux	Switzerland

==== 81 kg ====
Position	Judoka	Country
1.	Ole Bischof	Germany
2.	Boris Novotný	Slovakia
3.	Euan Burton	Great Britain
3.	Robert Krawczyk	Poland
5.	Guillaume Elmont	Netherlands
5.	Anthony Rodriguez	France
7.	Illya Chymchyuri	Ukraine
7.	Grigori Mamrikishvili	Georgia

==== 90 kg ====
Position	Judoka	Country
1.	David Alarza	Spain
2.	Roberto Meloni	Italy
3.	Sergei Aschwanden	Switzerland
3.	Mark Huizinga	Netherlands
5.	Michael Pinske	Germany
5.	Irakli Tsirekidze	Georgia
7.	Valentyn Grekov	Ukraine
7.	Steven Vidler	Great Britain

==== 100 kg ====
Position	Judoka	Country
1.	Christophe Humbert	France
2.	Ariel Ze'evi	Israel
3.	Daniel Brata	Romania
3.	Ruslan Gasymov	Russia
5.	Yury Rybak	Belarus
5.	Elco van der Geest	Netherlands
7.	Amel Mekić	Bosnia and Herzegovina
7.	Michele Monti	Italy

==== +100 kg ====
Position	Judoka	Country
1.	Alexander Mikhaylin	Russia
2.	Janusz Wojnarowicz	Poland
3.	Andrian Kordon	Israel
3.	Dennis van der Geest	Netherlands
5.	Barna Bor	Hungary
5.	Selim Tataroğlu	Turkey
7.	Ivan Iliev	Bulgaria
7.	Martin Padar	Estonia

=== Women ===
==== 48 kg ====
Position	Judoka	Country
1.	Alina Alexandra Dumitru	Romania
2.	Frédérique Jossinet	France
3.	Tatiana Moskvina	Belarus
3.	Neşe Şensoy	Turkey
5.	Maria Karagiannopoulou	Greece
5.	Ann Simons	Belgium
7.	Tetyana Lusnikova	Ukraine
7.	Camilla Magnolfi	Italy

==== 52 kg ====
Position	Judoka	Country
1.	Ilse Heylen	Belgium
2.	Ioana Maria Aluaș	Romania
3.	Telma Monteiro	Portugal
3.	Petra Nareks	Slovenia
5.	Jaana Sundberg	Finland
5.	Natascha van Gurp	Netherlands
7.	Barbara Bukowska	Poland
7.	Antonia Cuomo	Italy

==== 57 kg ====
Position	Judoka	Country
1.	Olga Sonina	Russia
2.	Sophie Cox	Great Britain
3.	Isabel Fernández	Spain
3.	Sabrina Filzmoser	Austria
5.	Ioulietta Boukouvala	Greece
5.	Fanny Riaboff	France
7.	Kifayat Gasimova	Azerbaijan
7.	Deborah Gravenstijn	Netherlands

==== 63 kg ====
Position	Judoka	Country
1.	Elisabeth Willeboordse	Netherlands
2.	Claudia Heill	Austria
3.	Lucie Décosse	France
3.	Claudia Malzahn	Germany
5.	Andreia Cavalleri	Portugal
5.	Giulia Quintavalle	Italy
7.	Sarah Clark	Great Britain
7.	Nadiya Gerasymenko	Ukraine

==== 70 kg ====
Position	Judoka	Country
1.	Edith Bosch	Netherlands
2.	Ylenia Scapin	Italy
3.	Catherine Jacques	Belgium
3.	Anett Mészáros	Hungary
5.	Silvia Schlagnitweit	Austria
5.	Raša Sraka	Slovenia
7.	Sanna Laitinen	Finland
7.	Maryna Pryshchepa	Ukraine

==== 78 kg ====
Position	Judoka	Country
1.	Céline Lebrun	France
2.	Rachel Wilding	Great Britain
3.	Anastasiya Matrosova	Ukraine
3.	Lucia Morico	Italy
5.	Marianne Morawek	Austria
5.	Claudia Zwiers	Netherlands
7.	Agnieszka Czepukojć	Poland
7.	Raquel Prieto Madrigal	Spain

==== +78 kg ====
Position	Judoka	Country
1.	Karina Bryant	Great Britain
2.	Tea Donguzashvili	Russia
3.	Katrin Beinroth	Germany
3.	Maryna Prokofyeva	Ukraine
5.	Yuliya Barysik	Belarus
5.	Anne-Sophie Mondière	France
7.	Sandra Borderieux	Spain
7.	Carola Uilenhoed	Netherlands
