= Anna Żemła-Krajewska =

Polish judoka

Personal information
- Nationality: Polish
- Born: 13 February 1979 (age 47) Jastrzębie-Zdrój, Poland
- Occupation: Judoka
- Height: 1.59 m (5 ft 3 in)

Sport
- Country: Poland
- Sport: Judo
- Weight class: –48 kg
- Club: Koka Jastrzebie Zdroj
- Coached by: Robert Radlak

Achievements and titles
- Olympic Games: 7th (2004)
- World Champ.: 5th (2001)
- European Champ.: 5th (2001)
Medal record
Women's judo
Representing Poland
World Juniors Championships
Bronze medal – third place	1998 Cali	–48 kg
European Junior Championships
Bronze medal – third place	1997 Ljubljana	–48 kg

Profile at external databases
- IJF: 52928
- JudoInside.com: 1187
- Updated on 10 January 2023

Anna Żemła-Krajewska (born 13 February 1979) is a Polish judoka, who competed in the women's extra-lightweight category. She held three Polish senior titles in her own division, picked up a total of twenty-one medals in her career, and finished seventh in the 48-kg class at the 2004 Summer Olympics. Zemla-Krajewska also trained as a full-fledged member of the judo squad for Koka Jastrzebie Zdroj in her native Jastrzębie-Zdrój under her personal coach and sensei Robert Radlak.

Zemla-Krajewska qualified for the Polish squad in the women's extra-lightweight class (48 kg) at the 2004 Summer Olympics in Athens, by placing second and receiving a berth from the A-Tournament in Tallinn, Estonia. She opened her match with an astonishing victory over Russian judoka and 2000 Olympic silver medalist Lyubov Bruletova, before falling in a smashing ippon defeat and an ushiro goshi (rear throw) from Romania's Alina Dumitru in the quarterfinals. Following her opponent's progress to the semifinal, Zemla-Krajewska incurred a triple shido deduction for failing to apply pressure on Kazakhstan's Tatyana Shishkina in their repechage match, but she restored her lead on the tatami to pin her opponent at three minutes and thirteen seconds. As she gave herself a chance for a coveted spot in the bronze medal match against Germany's Julia Matijass, Zemla-Krajewska came up short with an ippon seoi nage assault from Greece's Maria Karagiannopoulou much to the boisterous cheer of the home crowd inside Ano Liossia Hall, relegating Zemla-Krajewska to the seventh position.
