= Taveira =

Taveira (Portuguese pronunciation: [ta'vejɾɐ]) is a Portuguese surname.

== Notable people with this surname ==
- Alberto Taveira Corrêa (1950), Brazilian prelate of the Roman Catholic Church
- Ângelo Taveira (2000), Portuguese footballer
- Célio Taveira (1940–2020), Brazilian footballer
- João Taveira (1984), Portuguese judoka
- Tomás Taveira (1938), Portuguese architect and former university teacher.
