= Daniela Polzin =

Brazilian Olympic judoka (born 1979)

Personal information
- Full name: Daniela Duque Estrada Polzin
- Nationality: Brazil
- Born: 4 March 1979 (age 47) Rio de Janeiro, Brazil
- Occupation: Judoka
- Height: 1.59 m (5 ft 2 1/2 in)
- Weight: 48 kg (106 lb)

Sport
- Sport: Judo
- Event: 48 kg
- Club: Universidade Gama Filho
Medal record
Women's judo
Representing Brazil
Pan American Games
Silver medal – second place	2007 Rio de Janeiro	–48 kg
Pan American Championships
Silver medal – second place	2007 Montreal	–48 kg

Profile at external databases
- JudoInside.com: 10565

Daniela Duque Estrada Polzin (born March 4, 1979, in Rio de Janeiro) is a Brazilian judoka who competed in the women's extra-lightweight category. She held a 2008 Brazilian senior title for her own division, picked up a total of seventeen medals in her career, including a silver from the 2007 Pan American Games in Rio de Janeiro, and also represented Brazil in the 57-kg class at the 2004 Summer Olympics. Throughout most of her sporting career, Polzin also trained as a full-fledged member of Universidade Gama Filho's judo squad.

Polzin qualified for the Brazilian squad in the women's extra-lightweight class (48 kg) at the 2004 Summer Olympics in Athens, by placing second from the Pan American Judo Championships in Margarita Island, Venezuela. She lost her opening match to Chinese judoka and eventual bronze medalist Gao Feng, who successfully scored an ippon, and gripped her in the tatami with a kata guruma (shoulder wheel) assault at one minute and twenty-seven seconds.

When her country Brazil hosted the 2007 Pan American Games in Rio de Janeiro, Polzin had to satisfy with a silver medal during her final match against Cuba's Yanet Bermoy in the 48-kg division.

An architect graduated in the Universidade Gama Filho, Polzin has since retirement designed training facilities for the Brazilian Olympic Committee.
