= Aliaksandr Shlyk =

Belarusian judoka (born 1974)

Personal information
- Born: 28 January 1974 (age 52)
- Occupation: Judoka

Sport
- Country: Belarus
- Sport: Judo
- Weight class: –66 kg

Achievements and titles
- World Champ.: R32 (1997, 2003, 2005)
- European Champ.: (bronze) (2005)
Medal record
Men's judo
Representing Belarus
European Championships
Bronze medal – third place	2005 Rotterdam	–66 kg

Profile at external databases
- IJF: 18006
- JudoInside.com: 657
- Updated on 17 November 2022

Aliaksandr Shlyk (born 28 January 1974) is a Belarusian judoka.

== Achievements ==
Year	Tournament	Place	Weight class
2005	European Judo Championships	3rd	Half lightweight (66 kg)
2003	European Judo Championships	7th	Half lightweight (66 kg)
1997	European Judo Championships	7th	Half lightweight (65 kg)
