= Mikalai =

Mikalai is a masculine Belarusian given name. Notable people with the name include:

- Mikalai Barkouski, Belarusian judoka
- Mikalai Kamianchuk (born 1987), Belarusian pair skater
- Mikalai Novikau (born 1986), Belarusian weightlifter
- Mikalai Sharlap (born 1994), Belarusian rower
- Mikalai Shubianok (born 1985), Belarusian decathlete
- Mikalai Zhukavets (born 1986), Belarusian windsurfer
