= Barkouski =

Barkouski is a surname. Notable people with the surname include:

- Mikalai Barkouski, a Belarusian judoka
- Pavel Barkouski, a Belarusian philosopher, appointed representative in the United Transitional Cabinet of Belarus in August 2025
