= Mrdić =

Mrdić is a surname. Notable people with the surname include:

- Mitar Mrdić (born 1984), Bosnian judoka
- Uglješa Mrdić, Serbian politician
