= Giuseppina Macrì =

Italian Olympic judoka

Personal information
- Full name: Giuseppina Macrì
- Nationality: Italy
- Born: 3 September 1974 (age 51) Crotone, Italy
- Occupation: Judoka
- Height: 1.58 m (5 ft 2 in)
- Weight: 48 kg (106 lb)

Sport
- Sport: Judo
- Event: 48 kg
- Club: Judo Club Facente Cutro
- Coached by: Oscar Facente
Medal record
Women's judo
Representing Italy
Mediterranean Games
| Silver medal – second place | 2001 Tunis | 48 kg |
| Bronze medal – third place | 1997 Bari | 48 kg |
World Championships
| Bronze medal – third place | 2001 Munich | 48 kg |
European Championships
| Bronze medal – third place | 2001 Paris | 48 kg |
| Bronze medal – third place | 2002 Maribor | 48 kg |
| Bronze medal – third place | 2003 Dusseldorf | 48 kg |

Profile at external databases
- JudoInside.com: 446

Giuseppina Macrì (born 3 September 1974 in Crotone) is an Italian judoka, who competed in the women's extra-lightweight category. She held five Italian senior titles in her own division, picked up a total of twenty-five medals in her career, including three from the European Championships, two from the Mediterranean Games (1997 and 2001), and a coveted bronze from the 2001 World Judo Championships in Munich, Germany, and represented her nation Italy at the 2004 Summer Olympics. Macri also trained for Judo Club Facente Cutro in the outskirts of her native Crotone under head coach and sensei Oscar Facente.

Macri emerged herself into the international scene and reached the pinnacle of her judo career at the 2001 Mediterranean Games in Tunis, Tunisia, where she picked up a silver medal in the 48-kg division, losing the final match to Turkish judoka and later two-time Olympian Neşe Şensoy Yıldız. A few months later, Macri edged Poland's Anna Żemła-Krajewska off the tatami by an ippon victory to notch a bronze at the World Championships in Munich, Germany, and then until 2003, she boosted three more with the similar color in her respective category at the European Championships.

At the 2004 Summer Olympics in Athens, Macri qualified for the Italian judo squad in the women's extra-lightweight class (48 kg), by topping the field and receiving a berth from the Super A-Tournament in Moscow, Russia. She received a bye in the opening round, but succumbed to an ippon score and a yoko shiho gatame (side four-quarter) hold from China's Gao Feng with nearly a minute remaining in their second round match.
