= Evgeny Kudyakov =

Russian judoka

Personal information
- Born: 30 April 1985 (age 41)
- Occupation: Judoka

Sport
- Country: Russia
- Sport: Judo
- Weight class: ‍–‍60 kg

Achievements and titles
- European Champ.: 7th (2005)
Medal record
Men's judo
Representing Russia
IJF Grand Slam
Bronze medal – third place	2009 Moscow	‍–‍60 kg

Profile at external databases
- IJF: 3644
- JudoInside.com: 16404
- Updated on 28 November 2022

Evgeny Kudyakov (born 30 April 1985) is a Russian judoka.

== Achievements ==
Year	Tournament	Place	Weight class
2005	European Judo Championships	7th	Extra lightweight (60 kg)
