= Tatyana Shishkina =

Russian-born Kazakhstani Olympic judoka

Personal information
- Full name: Tatyana Nikolayevna Shishkina
- Nationality: Russia; Kazakhstan
- Born: 27 April 1969 (age 57) Samara, Russian SFSR, Soviet Union
- Height: 1.50 m (4 ft 11 in)
- Weight: 48 kg (106 lb)

Sport
- Sport: Judo
- Event: 48 kg
Medal record
Women's judo
Representing Kazakhstan
Asian Championships
Bronze medal – third place	2004 Almaty	48 kg

Tatyana Nikolayevna Shishkina (Russian: Татьяна Николаевна Шишкина; born 27 April 1969 in Samara, Russian SFSR) is a Russian-born Kazakhstani judoka, who competed in the women's extra-lightweight category. Holding a dual citizenship to compete internationally, she earned a bronze medal in the 48-kg division at the 2004 Asian Judo Championships in Almaty, and represented her naturalized nation Kazakhstan at the 2004 Summer Olympics.

Shishkina emerged herself in the international scene at the 2001 World Judo Championships in Munich, Germany, where she scored a seventh-place finish for the Russian squad in the 48-kg division. In 2002, Shishkina had decided to transfer her allegiance to Kazakhstan, and then competed for her naturalized squad at the Asian Games in Busan, South Korea, where she placed fifth in the same division, losing the bronze medal match to North Korea's Ri Kyong-ok by an ippon.

At the 2004 Summer Olympics in Athens, Shishkina qualified for the Kazakh squad, as a 35-year-old, in the women's extra-lightweight class (48 kg), by placing third and receiving a berth from the Asian Championships in Almaty. Shishkina opened her match with a more convincing victory over Colombia's Lisseth Orozco by a two-point advantage on koka, before she conceded with a shido penalty and succumbed to an ippon and an uchi mata (inner high throw) assault from Romania's Alina Dumitru. In the repechage, Shishkina offered herself a chance for an Olympic bronze medal, but slipped it away in a defeat to Poland's Anna Żemła-Krajewska by a brilliant ippon three minutes and thirteen seconds into their first playoff of the draft.
