= Dmitri Kabanov (judoka) =

Russian judoka

Personal information
- Born: 13 February 1980 (age 46)
- Occupation: Judoka

Sport
- Country: Russia
- Sport: Judo
- Weight class: ‍–‍100 kg

Achievements and titles
- World Champ.: (bronze) (2005)
Medal record
Men's judo
Representing Russia
World Championships
Bronze medal – third place	2005 Cairo	‍–‍100 kg

Profile at external databases
- IJF: 6142
- JudoInside.com: 15210
- Updated on 19 November 2022

Dmitri Borisovich Kabanov (Russian: Дмитрий Борисович Кабанов; born 13 February 1980) is a Russian judoka.

== Achievements ==
Year	Tournament	Place	Weight class
2001	Russia Judo Championships	3rd	Half heavyweight (100 kg)
2004	Russia Sambo Championships	3rd	Half heavyweight (100 kg)
2004	Russia Judo Championships	1st	Half heavyweight (100 kg)
2005	World Judo Championships	3rd	Half heavyweight (100 kg)
2008	Russia Judo Championships	3rd	Half heavyweight (100 kg)
