= Henri Schoeman (judoka) =

Dutch judoka

Henri Schoeman (born 22 April 1983 in Zutphen) is a Dutch former judoka. At the 2005 International Judo Federation world championships in Cairo he finished fifth in the -73 kg division. He won his first 4 matches and lost in the semi-finals and repechage.

Since retiring from active judo, he teaches physical education and coaches judo.

== Achievements ==
Year	Tournament	Place	Weight class
2005	World Judo Championships	5th	Lightweight (73 kg)
2005	European Judo Championships	5th	Lightweight (73 kg)
