= Siarhei Novikau (judoka) =

Belarusian judoka (born 1982)

Personal information
- Born: 8 January 1982 (age 44)
- Occupation: Judoka

Sport
- Country: Belarus
- Sport: Judo
- Weight class: –60 kg, –66 kg

Achievements and titles
- Olympic Games: R32 (2004)
- World Champ.: 9th (2007)
- European Champ.: 5th (2001, 2004)
Medal record
Men's judo
Representing Belarus
European Junior Championships
Gold medal – first place	2001 Budapest	–60 kg

Profile at external databases
- IJF: 5527
- JudoInside.com: 14218
- Updated on 17 February 2022

Siarhei Novikau (born January 8, 1982) is a Belarusian judoka.

== Achievements ==
Year	Tournament	Place	Weight class
2004	European Judo Championships	5th	Extra lightweight (60 kg)
2001	European Judo Championships	5th	Extra lightweight (60 kg)
