= Daniel Fernandes =

Daniel Fernandes may refer to:

- Daniel Fernandes (judoka) (born 1973), French Olympic judoka
- Daniel Fernandes (footballer) (born 1983), Canadian-born Portuguese footballer
- Daniel Heuer Fernandes (born 1992), German-born Portuguese footballer
- Daniel Fernandes (comedian), Indian comedian based in Mumbai
- Danny Fernandes (born 1985), Canadian singer of Portuguese descent

== See also ==
- Daniel Fernandez (disambiguation)
