= Ruben Houkes =

Dutch judoka (born 1979)

Personal information
- Born: 8 June 1979 (age 47)
- Occupation: Judoka

Sport
- Country: Netherlands
- Sport: Judo
- Weight class: ‍–‍60 kg

Achievements and titles
- Olympic Games: (bronze) (2008)
- World Champ.: (2007)
- European Champ.: (silver) (2008)
Medal record
Men's judo
Representing the Netherlands
Olympic Games
Bronze medal – third place	2008 Beijing	‍–‍60 kg
World Championships
Gold medal – first place	2007 Rio de Janeiro	‍–‍60 kg
European Championships
Silver medal – second place	2008 Lisbon	‍–‍60 kg
Bronze medal – third place	2005 Rotterdam	‍–‍60 kg
Bronze medal – third place	2006 Tampere	‍–‍60 kg

Profile at external databases
- IJF: 8548
- JudoInside.com: 53
- Updated on 28 May 2023

Ruben Houkes (born 8 June 1979 in Schagen, North Holland) is a Dutch judoka.

== Judo career ==
Houkes won gold in the men's ‍–‍60 kg class at the 2007 World Judo Championships.

Houkes won a bronze medal at the 2008 Beijing Olympics in the Men's ‍–‍60 kg class.

== Achievements ==
Year	Tournament	Place	Weight class
2009	European Championships	5th	Extra lightweight (60 kg)
2008	Olympic Games Beijing	3rd	Extra lightweight (60 kg)
2008	European Championships	2nd	Extra lightweight (60 kg)
2007	World Championships	1st	Extra lightweight (60 kg)
2006	European Championships	3rd	Extra lightweight (60 kg)
2005	European Championships	3rd	Extra lightweight (60 kg)
2004	European Championships	5th	Extra lightweight (60 kg)
2003	European Championships	7th	Extra lightweight (60 kg)
