= Pierre Robin (judoka) =

French judoka (born 1982)

Personal information
- Born: 1 November 1982 (age 44)
- Occupation: Judoka

Sport
- Country: France
- Sport: Judo
- Weight class: +100 kg

Achievements and titles
- World Champ.: (bronze) (2005)
- European Champ.: (bronze) (2008)
Medal record
Men's judo
Representing France
World Championships
Bronze medal – third place	2005 Cairo	+100 kg
European Championships
Bronze medal – third place	2008 Lisbon	+100 kg
IJF Grand Slam
Bronze medal – third place	2009 Paris	+100 kg
Bronze medal – third place	2009 Rio de Janeiro	+100 kg
European U23 Championships
Gold medal – first place	2004 Ljubljana	+100 kg
European Junior Championships
Gold medal – first place	2001 Budapest	+100 kg

Profile at external databases
- IJF: 739
- JudoInside.com: 11536
- Updated on 16 November 2022

Pierre Robin (French: [pjɛʁ ʁɔbɛ̃]; born 1 November 1982) is a French judoka.
