= Bertille Ali =

Judoka from the Central African Republic

Personal information
- Full name: Bertille-Mallorie Ali
- Nationality: Central African Republic
- Born: 22 April 1982 (age 44) Bangui, Central African Republic
- Occupation: Judoka
- Height: 1.58 m (5 ft 2 in)
- Weight: 48 kg (106 lb)

Sport
- Sport: Judo
- Event: 48 kg

Profile at external databases
- IJF: 52921
- JudoInside.com: 32013

Bertille-Mallorie Ali (born 22 April 1982 in Bangui) is a judoka from the Central African Republic, who competed in the women's extra-lightweight category. Ali qualified as the lone judoka for the Central African squad in the women's extra-lightweight class (48 kg) at the 2004 Summer Olympics in Athens, by placing third and receiving a berth from the African Qualification Tournament in Casablanca, Morocco. She lost her opening match to Algeria's Soraya Haddad, who successfully scored an ippon and threw her down the tatami with a kuchiki taoshi (single leg takedown) assault at 1 minute and 27 seconds.
