= Vitaliy Bubon =

Ukrainian judoka (born 1983)

Personal information
- Born: 20 July 1983 (age 43)
- Occupation: Judoka

Sport
- Country: Ukraine
- Sport: Judo
- Weight class: –100 kg

Achievements and titles
- World Champ.: (silver) (2005)
- European Champ.: 7th (2004)
Medal record
Men's judo
Representing Ukraine
World Championships
Silver medal – second place	2005 Cairo	–100 kg
European U23 Championships
Gold medal – first place	2003 Yerevan	–100 kg
Silver medal – second place	2005 Kyiv	–100 kg
European Junior Championships
Gold medal – first place	2002 Rotterdam	–100 kg
Silver medal – second place	2001 Budapest	–90 kg

Profile at external databases
- IJF: 45991
- JudoInside.com: 10200
- Updated on 11 February 2022

Vitaliy Bubon (born 20 July 1983) is a Ukrainian judoka.

== Achievements ==
Year	Tournament	Place	Weight class
2007	World Judo Championships	7th	Half heavyweight (100 kg)
2005	World Judo Championships	2nd	Half heavyweight (100 kg)
2004	European Judo Championships	7th	Half heavyweight (100 kg)
