= João Derly =

Brazilian judoka (born 1981)

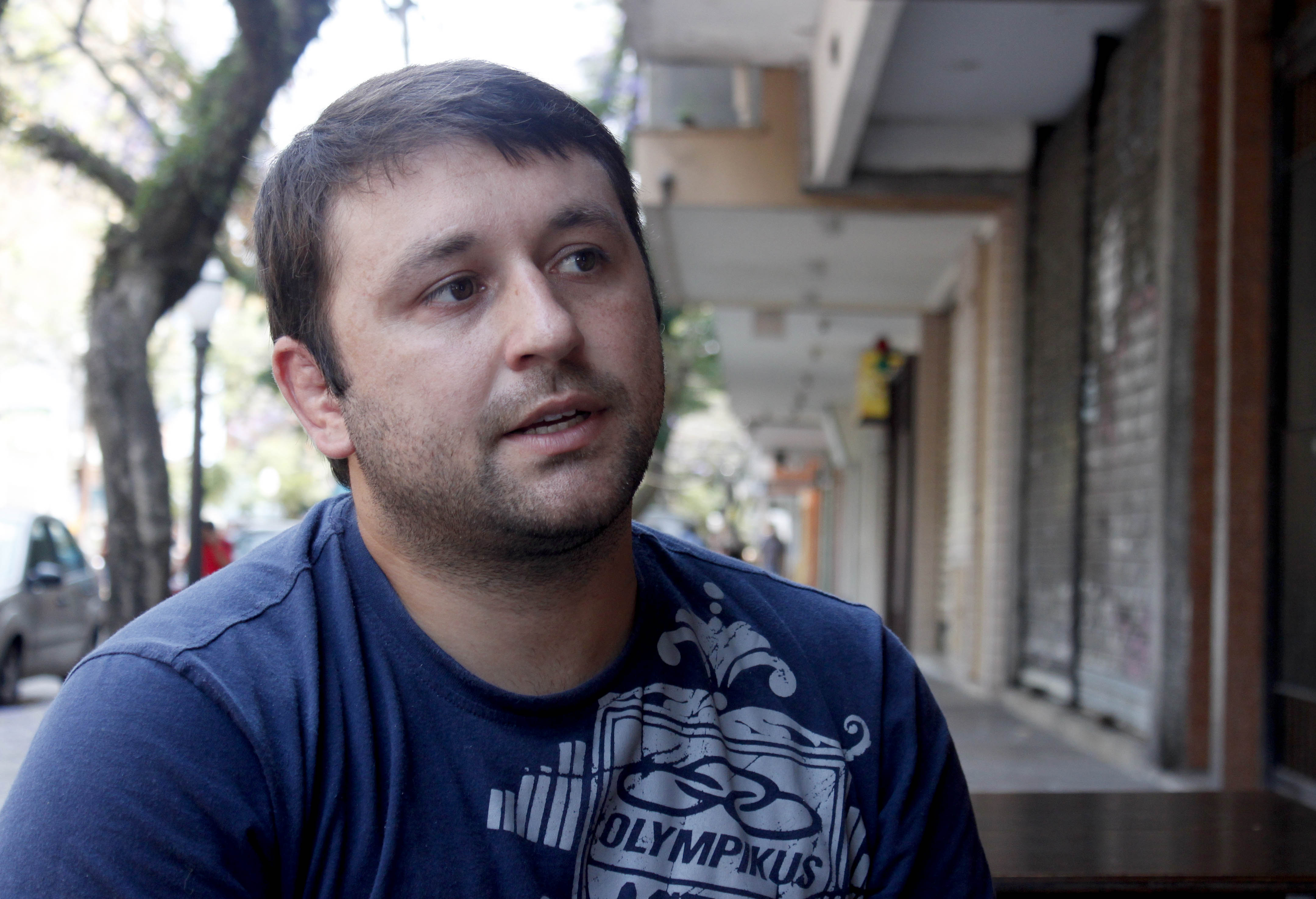

State Secretary of Sports and Leisure of Rio Grande do Sul
- In office 1 January 2019 – 2 June 2020
- Governor: Eduardo Leite
- Preceded by: Victor Hugo
- Succeeded by: Francisco Vargas

Federal Deputy from Rio Grande do Sul
- In office 1 February 2015 – 1 January 2019

City Councillor of Porto Alegre
- In office 1 January 2013 – 1 February 2015

Personal details
- Born: João Derly de Oliveira Nunes Júnior; 2 July 1981 (age 45) Porto Alegre, Rio Grande do Sul, Brazil
- Party: REPUBLICANOS (2019–present)
- Other political affiliations: PCdoB (2011–2015); REDE (2015–2019)
- Sports career
- Height: 164 cm (5 ft 5 in)
- Weight: 79 kg (174 lb) (2011)
- Country: Brazil
- Sport: Judo
Medal record
Men's judo
Representing Brazil
World Championships
Gold medal – first place	2005 Cairo	–66 kg
Gold medal – first place	2007 Rio de Janeiro	–66 kg
Pan American Games
Gold medal – first place	2007 Rio de Janeiro	–66 kg
Pan American Championships
Gold medal – first place	2005 Caguas	–66 kg
Gold medal – first place	2009 Buenos Aires	–66 kg
Silver medal – second place	2003 Salvador	–60 kg
Bronze medal – third place	1997 Guadalajara	–56 kg
Bronze medal – third place	2001 Cordoba	–60 kg
World Juniors Championships
Gold medal – first place	2000 Nabeul	–60 kg
Summer Universiade
Bronze medal – third place	2001 Beijing	–60 kg
South American Games
Disqualified	2002 Rio de Janeiro	–60 kg
- Updated on 23 February 2022

João Derly de Oliveira Nunes Jr. (born June 2, 1981 in Porto Alegre, Rio Grande do Sul) is a former male judoka from Brazil, and one of only two Brazilians (the other being Mayra Aguiar) to become a two-time world champion, winning consecutively the 2005 World Judo Championships and 2007 World Judo Championships. He also won the junior world championship in 2000, the 2007 Pan American Games, and has 5 gold, 2 silver and 1 bronze medals in Judo World Cups.

After the 2002 South American Games he tested positive for banned diuretic drugs he had used in order to maintain his weight class.

After retirement as a judoka, he was elected as city council member and later as a member of the House of Representatives. Later he was nominated secretary of sports of the State of Rio Grande do Sul.

Awards
Preceded by Vanderlei de Lima	Brazilian Sportsmen of the Year; 2005	Succeeded by Giba
Political offices
Preceded by Victor Hugo	State Secretary of Sports and Leisure of Rio Grande do Sul; 2019–20	Succeeded by Francisco Vargas
