= 2009 Judo Grand Slam Moscow =

Judo competition

Judo 2009 Judo Grand Slam Moscow
- Location: Moscow, Russia
- Dates: 30–31 May 2009
- Competitors: 320 from 39 nations

Competition at external databases
- Links: IJF • JudoInside

The 2009 Judo Grand Slam Moscow was held in Moscow, Russia, from 30 to 31 May 2009.

== Medal summary ==
=== Men's events ===
Event	Gold	Silver	Bronze
Extra-lightweight (−60 kg)	Hovhannes Davtyan (ARM)	Masaaki Fukuoka (JPN)	Evgeny Kudyakov (RUS)
Extra-lightweight (−60 kg)	Hovhannes Davtyan (ARM)	Masaaki Fukuoka (JPN)	Beslan Mudranov (RUS)
Half-lightweight (−66 kg)	Khashbaataryn Tsagaanbaatar (MGL)	Sugoi Uriarte (ESP)	Khishigbayar Buuveibaatar (MGL)
Half-lightweight (−66 kg)	Khashbaataryn Tsagaanbaatar (MGL)	Sugoi Uriarte (ESP)	Miklós Ungvári (HUN)
Lightweight (−73 kg)	Wang Ki-chun (KOR)	Dirk Van Tichelt (BEL)	Mansur Isaev (RUS)
Lightweight (−73 kg)	Wang Ki-chun (KOR)	Dirk Van Tichelt (BEL)	Attila Ungvári (HUN)
Half-middleweight (−81 kg)	Siarhei Shundzikau (BLR)	Aliaksandr Stsiashenka (BLR)	Ole Bischof (GER)
Half-middleweight (−81 kg)	Siarhei Shundzikau (BLR)	Aliaksandr Stsiashenka (BLR)	Song Dae-nam (KOR)
Middleweight (−90 kg)	Takashi Ono (JPN)	Andrei Kazusenok (BLR)	Tiago Camilo (BRA)
Middleweight (−90 kg)	Takashi Ono (JPN)	Andrei Kazusenok (BLR)	Murat Gasiev (RUS)
Half-heavyweight (−100 kg)	Hwang Hee-tae (KOR)	Luciano Corrêa (BRA)	Jevgeņijs Borodavko (LAT)
Half-heavyweight (−100 kg)	Hwang Hee-tae (KOR)	Luciano Corrêa (BRA)	Ramadan Darwish (EGY)
Heavyweight (+100 kg)	Alexander Mikhaylin (RUS)	Andreas Tölzer (GER)	Barna Bor (HUN)
Heavyweight (+100 kg)	Alexander Mikhaylin (RUS)	Andreas Tölzer (GER)	Martin Padar (EST)

=== Women's events ===
Event	Gold	Silver	Bronze
Extra-lightweight (−48 kg)	Tomoko Fukumi (JPN)	Chung Jung-yeon (KOR)	Éva Csernoviczki (HUN)
Extra-lightweight (−48 kg)	Tomoko Fukumi (JPN)	Chung Jung-yeon (KOR)	Chahnez M'barki (TUN)
Half-lightweight (−52 kg)	Misato Nakamura (JPN)	Natalia Kuziutina (RUS)	Kitty Bravik (NED)
Half-lightweight (−52 kg)	Misato Nakamura (JPN)	Natalia Kuziutina (RUS)	Romy Tarangul (GER)
Lightweight (−57 kg)	Kaori Matsumoto (JPN)	Hedvig Karakas (HUN)	Ioulietta Boukouvala (GRE)
Lightweight (−57 kg)	Kaori Matsumoto (JPN)	Hedvig Karakas (HUN)	Telma Monteiro (POR)
Half-middleweight (−63 kg)	Marielle Pruvost (FRA)	Yoshie Ueno (JPN)	Sainjargal Batbayar (MGL)
Half-middleweight (−63 kg)	Marielle Pruvost (FRA)	Yoshie Ueno (JPN)	Anicka van Emden (NED)
Middleweight (−70 kg)	Yoriko Kunihara (JPN)	Edith Bosch (NED)	Marie Pasquet (FRA)
Middleweight (−70 kg)	Yoriko Kunihara (JPN)	Edith Bosch (NED)	Kerstin Thiele (GER)
Half-heavyweight (−78 kg)	Yang Xiuli (CHN)	Stéphanie Possamaï (FRA)	Maryna Pryshchepa (UKR)
Half-heavyweight (−78 kg)	Yang Xiuli (CHN)	Stéphanie Possamaï (FRA)	Yahima Ramirez (POR)
Heavyweight (+78 kg)	Maki Tsukada (JPN)	Nihel Cheikh Rouhou (TUN)	Elena Ivashchenko (RUS)
Heavyweight (+78 kg)	Maki Tsukada (JPN)	Nihel Cheikh Rouhou (TUN)	Urszula Sadkowska (POL)

Source Results

=== Medal table ===
* Host nation (Russia)

Rank	Nation	Gold	Silver	Bronze	Total
1	Japan (JPN)	6	2	0	8
2	South Korea (KOR)	2	1	1	4
3	Belarus (BLR)	1	2	0	3
4	Russia (RUS)*	1	1	5	7
5	France (FRA)	1	1	1	3
6	Mongolia (MGL)	1	0	2	3
7	Armenia (ARM)	1	0	0	1
7	China (CHN)	1	0	0	1
9	Hungary (HUN)	0	1	4	5
10	Germany (GER)	0	1	3	4
11	Netherlands (NED)	0	1	2	3
12	Brazil (BRA)	0	1	1	2
12	Tunisia (TUN)	0	1	1	2
14	Belgium (BEL)	0	1	0	1
14	Spain (ESP)	0	1	0	1
16	Portugal (POR)	0	0	2	2
17	Egypt (EGY)	0	0	1	1
17	Estonia (EST)	0	0	1	1
17	Greece (GRE)	0	0	1	1
17	Latvia (LAT)	0	0	1	1
17	Poland (POL)	0	0	1	1
17	Ukraine (UKR)	0	0	1	1
Totals (22 entries)		14	14	28	56
