= Liu Renwang =

Chinese judoka

Personal information
- Born: 22 July 1986 (age 39)
- Occupation: Judoka

Sport
- Country: China
- Sport: Judo
- Weight class: –60 kg, –66 kg

Achievements and titles
- Olympic Games: R16 (2008)
- World Champ.: 13th (2007)
- Asian Champ.: R16 (2012)
Medal record
Men's judo
Representing China
IJF Grand Prix
Silver medal – second place	2009 Qingdao	–66 kg
Asian Junior Championships
Gold medal – first place	2004 Doha	–60 kg
East Asian Games
Bronze medal – third place	2009 Hong Kong	–66 kg

Profile at external databases
- IJF: 2690
- JudoInside.com: 34332
- Updated on 2 January 2023

Liu Renwang (Chinese: 劉仁旺; born 22 July 1986 in Beijing), is a male Chinese judoka who competed at the 2008 Summer Olympics in the Extra lightweight (under 60 kg) event.

== Major performances ==
- 2005 National Games - 1st 60 kg class;
- 2007 National Champions Tournament - 1st 60 kg class;
- 2007 Japan Jigoro Kano Cup - 3rd 60 kg class

== See also ==
- China at the 2008 Summer Olympics
