= Ruslan Kishmakov =

Russian judoka (born 1979)

Ruslan Kishmakhov
Personal information
- Full name: Ruslan Mukhadinovich Kishmakhov
- Born: 11 September 1979 (age 46) Psyzh, Karachay-Cherkessia, Russia
- Occupation: Judoka
- Height: 160 cm (5 ft 3 in)

Sport
- Country: Russia
- Sport: Judo
- Weight class: –60 kg

Achievements and titles
- Olympic Games: 9th (2008)
- World Champ.: R64 (2007)
- European Champ.: (gold) (2007)
Medal record
Men's judo
Representing Russia
European Championships
Gold medal – first place	2007 Belgrade	–60 kg

Profile at external databases
- IJF: 1828
- JudoInside.com: 20847
- Updated on 16 November 2022

Ruslan Mukhadinovich Kishmakhov (Russian: Руслан Мухадинович Кишмахов, born 11 September 1979) is a Russian judoka. He competed for Russia at the 2008 Summer Olympics in the men's 60 kg event.

== Achievements ==
Year	Tournament	Place	Weight class
2008	European Championships	5th	Extra lightweight (60 kg)
2007	European Judo Championships	1st	Extra lightweight (60 kg)
