= 2008 East Asian Judo Championships =

Judo competition

Judo Judo
- Venue: Taiwan Police College
- Location: Taipei, Taiwan
- Dates: 20–21 September 2008

Competition at external databases
- Links: JudoInside

The 2008 East Asian Judo Championships was contested in seven weight classes, seven each for men and women.

This competition was held at Gym of Taiwan Police College in Taipei, Taiwan, 20 and 21 September.

== Medal overview ==
=== Men ===
Event	Gold	Silver	Bronze
Extra-lightweight (60 kg)	Choi Gwang-Hyeon (KOR)	Masaaki Fukuoka (JPN)	Lin Chueh-chen (TPE)
Extra-lightweight (60 kg)	Choi Gwang-Hyeon (KOR)	Masaaki Fukuoka (JPN)	He Yunlong (CHN)
Half-lightweight (66 kg)	An Jeong-Hwan (KOR)	Dulguun Davaasuren (MGL)	Takashi Terai (JPN)
Half-lightweight (66 kg)	An Jeong-Hwan (KOR)	Dulguun Davaasuren (MGL)	Ho Yu-hao (TPE)
Lightweight (73 kg)	Yasuhiro Awano (JPN)	Sun (CHN)	Kim Won-Jung (KOR)
Lightweight (73 kg)	Yasuhiro Awano (JPN)	Sun (CHN)	Huang Chun-ta (TPE)
Half-middleweight (81 kg)	Hong Suk Woong (KOR)	Wu Chen-ying (TPE)	Hirotaka Kato (JPN)
Half-middleweight (81 kg)	Hong Suk Woong (KOR)	Wu Chen-ying (TPE)	Wu Chia Luan (TPE)
Middleweight (90 kg)	Tatsuki Masubuchi (JPN)	Hwang Hee-Tae (KOR)	Hu Haifeng (CHN)
Middleweight (90 kg)	Tatsuki Masubuchi (JPN)	Hwang Hee-Tae (KOR)	Chiang Ching-an (TPE)
Half-heavyweight (100 kg)	Daisuke Kobayashi (JPN)	Kim Jung-hoon (KOR)	Ariun-Erdene Batbayar (MGL)
Half-heavyweight (100 kg)	Daisuke Kobayashi (JPN)	Kim Jung-hoon (KOR)	Chen Hai (CHN)
Heavyweight (+100 kg)	Yohei Takai (JPN)	Choi Sung-Won (KOR)	Tuguldur Bayarsaikhan (MGL)
Heavyweight (+100 kg)	Yohei Takai (JPN)	Choi Sung-Won (KOR)	Wang Huang-wen (TPE)

=== Women ===
Event	Gold	Silver	Bronze
Extra-lightweight (48 kg)	Tomoko Fukumi (JPN)	Chung Jung-Yeon (KOR)	Urantsetseg Munkhbat (MGL)
Extra-lightweight (48 kg)	Tomoko Fukumi (JPN)	Chung Jung-Yeon (KOR)	Chien Tzu-hui (TPE)
Half-lightweight (52 kg)	Xiao Jun (CHN)	Tomomi Furusugi (JPN)	Ye Gue-Rin (KOR)
Half-lightweight (52 kg)	Xiao Jun (CHN)	Tomomi Furusugi (JPN)	Jo Song-Hui (PRK)
Lightweight (57 kg)	Yasue Fujita (JPN)	Chang Yi-lun (TPE)	Lien Chen-ling (TPE)
Lightweight (57 kg)	Yasue Fujita (JPN)	Chang Yi-lun (TPE)	Choe Kyong-Sil (PRK)
Half-middleweight (63 kg)	Hwang Chun-Gum (PRK)	Nozomi Hirai (JPN)	Chen Jia-xin (TPE)
Half-middleweight (63 kg)	Hwang Chun-Gum (PRK)	Nozomi Hirai (JPN)	Xu Lili (CHN)
Middleweight (70 kg)	Kim (KOR)	Yoriko Kunihara (JPN)	Dou Shumei (CHN)
Middleweight (70 kg)	Kim (KOR)	Yoriko Kunihara (JPN)	Kim (PRK)
Half-heavyweight (78 kg)	Kumiko Horie (JPN)	Hyon Jong-Hui (PRK)	Lee So-yeon (KOR)
Half-heavyweight (78 kg)	Kumiko Horie (JPN)	Hyon Jong-Hui (PRK)	Hsu Hsin-mei (TPE)
Heavyweight (+78 kg)	Qin Qian (CHN)	Mika Sugimoto (JPN)	Tsai Hsiu Ya (TPE)
Heavyweight (+78 kg)	Qin Qian (CHN)	Mika Sugimoto (JPN)	Cheng Chiu-jung (TPE)

=== Medals table ===
Rank	Nation	Gold	Silver	Bronze	Total
1	Japan	7	5	2	14
2	South Korea	4	4	3	11
3	China	2	1	5	8
4	North Korea	1	1	3	5
5	Chinese Taipei	0	2	11	13
6	Mongolia	0	1	3	4
Totals (6 entries)		14	14	27	55

== See also ==
- List of sporting events in Taiwan
