= Ákos Braun =

Hungarian judoka (born 1978)

Personal information
- Born: 26 June 1978 (age 48)
- Occupation: Judoka

Sport
- Country: Hungary
- Sport: Judo
- Weight class: ‍–‍73 kg

Achievements and titles
- World Champ.: (gold) (2005)
- European Champ.: (gold) (2005)
Medal record
Men's judo
Representing Hungary
World Championships
| Gold medal – first place | 2005 Cairo | ‍–‍73 kg |
European Championships
| Gold medal – first place | 2005 Rotterdam | ‍–‍73 kg |
| Bronze medal – third place | 2008 Lisbon | ‍–‍73 kg |

Profile at external databases
- IJF: 13337
- JudoInside.com: 8876
- Updated on 16 November 2022

Ákos Braun (born 26 June 1978) is a Hungarian judoka.

Braun was named 2005 Hungarian Sportsman of the Year for winning gold medals at that year's World and European Championships.

== Achievements ==
| Year | Tournament | Place | Weight class |
|---|---|---|---|
| 2008 | European Championships | 3rd | Lightweight (73 kg) |
| 2005 | World Judo Championships | 1st | Lightweight (73 kg) |
| 2005 | European Judo Championships | 1st | Lightweight (73 kg) |

Awards
| Preceded by István Majoros | Hungarian Sportsman of The Year; 2005 | Succeeded by László Cseh |
