= 2001 European Junior Judo Championships =

Judo competition

Judo 2001 European Junior Judo Championships
- Location: Budapest, Hungary
- Dates: 16–18 November 2001

Competition at external databases
- Links: JudoInside

The 2001 European Junior Judo Championships is an edition of the European Junior Judo Championships, organised by the International Judo Federation. It was held in Budapest, Hungary from 16 to 18 November 2001.

== Medal summary ==
=== Medal table ===
* Host nation (Hungary)

| Rank | Nation | Gold | Silver | Bronze | Total |
|---|---|---|---|---|---|
| 1 | Ukraine (UKR) | 2 | 4 | 2 | 8 |
| 2 | Russia (RUS) | 2 | 1 | 3 | 6 |
| 3 | Germany (GER) | 2 | 1 | 1 | 4 |
| 3 | Romania (ROU) | 2 | 1 | 1 | 4 |
| 5 | France (FRA) | 2 | 0 | 2 | 4 |
| 6 | Slovenia (SLO) | 1 | 1 | 2 | 4 |
| 7 | Netherlands (NED) | 1 | 0 | 3 | 4 |
| 8 | Belarus (BLR) | 1 | 0 | 2 | 3 |
| 9 | Hungary (HUN)* | 1 | 0 | 1 | 2 |
| 10 | Great Britain (GBR) | 0 | 2 | 1 | 3 |
| 11 | Latvia (LAT) | 0 | 1 | 1 | 2 |
| 12 | Austria (AUT) | 0 | 1 | 0 | 1 |
| 12 | Greece (GRE) | 0 | 1 | 0 | 1 |
| 12 | Moldova (MDA) | 0 | 1 | 0 | 1 |
| 15 | Poland (POL) | 0 | 0 | 3 | 3 |
| 16 | Italy (ITA) | 0 | 0 | 2 | 2 |
| 16 | Spain (ESP) | 0 | 0 | 2 | 2 |
| 18 | Belgium (BEL) | 0 | 0 | 1 | 1 |
| 18 | Israel (ISR) | 0 | 0 | 1 | 1 |
| Totals (19 entries) | | 14 | 14 | 28 | 56 |

=== Men's events ===
| Event | Gold | Silver | Bronze |
|---|---|---|---|
| Extra-lightweight (−60 kg) | Siarhei Novikau (BLR) | Craig Fallon (GBR) | Marco Caudana (ITA) |
| Extra-lightweight (−60 kg) | Siarhei Novikau (BLR) | Craig Fallon (GBR) | Itai Mazor (ISR) |
| Half-lightweight (−66 kg) | Ion Busanu (ROU) | Vladimir Oleinic (MDA) | Aleksander Burylov (RUS) |
| Half-lightweight (−66 kg) | Ion Busanu (ROU) | Vladimir Oleinic (MDA) | Stanislav Knysh (UKR) |
| Lightweight (−73 kg) | Rustam Kodzoev (RUS) | Sašo Jereb (SLO) | Denis Kaltaniuk (BLR) |
| Lightweight (−73 kg) | Rustam Kodzoev (RUS) | Sašo Jereb (SLO) | Robby van Laarhoven (NED) |
| Half-middleweight (−81 kg) | Roman Hontyuk (UKR) | Konstantīns Ovčiņņikovs (LAT) | Alexandru Caponi (ROU) |
| Half-middleweight (−81 kg) | Roman Hontyuk (UKR) | Konstantīns Ovčiņņikovs (LAT) | David Carpio (ESP) |
| Middleweight (−90 kg) | Vyacheslav Delok (RUS) | Vitaliy Bubon (UKR) | Bruno Ivan Tomasetti (ITA) |
| Middleweight (−90 kg) | Vyacheslav Delok (RUS) | Vitaliy Bubon (UKR) | Grégoire Chevreau (FRA) |
| Half-heavyweight (−100 kg) | Mike Nieuwenhuijs (NED) | Dionysios Iliadis (GRE) | Harald Lubgans (LAT) |
| Half-heavyweight (−100 kg) | Mike Nieuwenhuijs (NED) | Dionysios Iliadis (GRE) | Benoît Bournisien (FRA) |
| Heavyweight (+100 kg) | Pierre Robin (FRA) | Olexiy Danilov (UKR) | Aleksander Blagodarnyi (RUS) |
| Heavyweight (+100 kg) | Pierre Robin (FRA) | Olexiy Danilov (UKR) | Grim Vuijsters (NED) |

=== Women's events ===
| Event | Gold | Silver | Bronze |
|---|---|---|---|
| Extra-lightweight (−48 kg) | Tetyana Lusnikova (UKR) | Alina Dumitru (ROU) | Irina Goremykina (RUS) |
| Extra-lightweight (−48 kg) | Tetyana Lusnikova (UKR) | Alina Dumitru (ROU) | Leen Dom (BEL) |
| Half-lightweight (−52 kg) | Annabelle Euranie (FRA) | Patrizia Grabowski (GER) | Petra Nareks (SLO) |
| Half-lightweight (−52 kg) | Annabelle Euranie (FRA) | Patrizia Grabowski (GER) | Zsuzsa Fekete (HUN) |
| Lightweight (−57 kg) | Zsuzsa Bejczi (HUN) | Hilde Drexler (AUT) | Romana Kasperkiewicz (POL) |
| Lightweight (−57 kg) | Zsuzsa Bejczi (HUN) | Hilde Drexler (AUT) | Katja Wagner (GER) |
| Half-middleweight (−63 kg) | Claudia Malzahn (GER) | Claire Scourfield (GBR) | Pien Selbeck (NED) |
| Half-middleweight (−63 kg) | Claudia Malzahn (GER) | Claire Scourfield (GBR) | Veronika Rainczuk (POL) |
| Middleweight (−70 kg) | Ulrike Koehler (GER) | Maryna Pryshchepa (UKR) | Sviatlana Tsimashenka (BLR) |
| Middleweight (−70 kg) | Ulrike Koehler (GER) | Maryna Pryshchepa (UKR) | Agnieszka Chlipala (POL) |
| Half-heavyweight (−78 kg) | Kristina Decman (SLO) | Svetlana Fedoseenko (RUS) | Lindsay Sorrell (GBR) |
| Half-heavyweight (−78 kg) | Kristina Decman (SLO) | Svetlana Fedoseenko (RUS) | Anastasiia Matrosova (UKR) |
| Heavyweight (+78 kg) | Nicoleta Mihalcea (ROU) | Maryna Prokofyeva (UKR) | Lucija Polavder (SLO) |
| Heavyweight (+78 kg) | Nicoleta Mihalcea (ROU) | Maryna Prokofyeva (UKR) | Rocío Fernández (ESP) |

Source Results
