= 2008 European Judo Championships =

2008 Judo European Judo Championships
- Venue: MEO Arena
- Location: Lisbon, Portugal
- Dates: 11–13 April 2008

Competition at external databases
- Links: JudoInside

The 2008 European Judo Championships were the nineteenth edition of the European Judo Championships, held in the Altice Arena, in Lisbon, Portugal, from April 11 to April 13, 2008.

== Medal overview ==
=== Men ===
| Event | Gold | Silver | Bronze |
|---|---|---|---|
| −60 kg | (Austria) Ludwig Paischer | (Netherlands) Ruben Houkes | (Greece) Lavrentis Alexanidis (Georgia (country)) Nestor Khergiani |
| −66 kg | (Georgia (country)) Zaza Kedelashvili | (Hungary) Miklos Ungvari | (Portugal) Pedro Dias (Russia) Alim Gadanov |
| −73 kg | (Belgium) Dirk Van Tichelt | (Spain) Kiyoshi Uematsu | (Hungary) Ákos Braun (Georgia (country)) David Kevkhishvili |
| −81 kg | (Portugal) João Neto | (Netherlands) Guillaume Elmont | (Belarus) Mikalai Barkouski (Italy) Giuseppe Maddaloni |
| −90 kg | (Netherlands) Mark Huizinga | (Azerbaijan) Elkhan Mammadov | (Belarus) Andrei Kazusionak (Georgia (country)) Irakli Tsirekidze |
| −100 kg | (Netherlands) Henk Grol | (Poland) Przemysław Matyjaszek | (Germany) Benjamin Behrla (Israel) Ariel Ze'evi |
| +100 kg | (Russia) Tamerlan Tmenov | (Italy) Paolo Bianchessi | (France) Pierre Robin (Ukraine) Yevgen Sotnikov |

=== Women ===
| Event | Gold | Silver | Bronze |
|---|---|---|---|
| −48 kg | (Romania) Alina Alexandra Dumitru | (France) Frédérique Jossinet | (Hungary) Éva Csernoviczki (Portugal) Ana Hormigo |
| −52 kg | (Spain) Ana Carrascosa | (Germany) Romy Tarangul | (Romania) Ioana Dinea (Slovenia) Petra Nareks |
| −57 kg | (Austria) Sabrina Filzmoser | (Spain) Isabel Fernández | (Azerbaijan) Kifayat Gasimova (France) Barbara Harel |
| −63 kg | (France) Lucie Décosse | (Germany) Claudia Malzahn | (Israel) Alice Schlesinger (Slovenia) Urška Žolnir |
| −70 kg | (Italy) Ylenia Scapin | (Spain) Leire Iglesias | (France) Gévrise Émane (Germany) Kerstin Thiele |
| −78 kg | (Germany) Heide Wollert | (Russia) Vera Moskalyuk | (Portugal) Yahima Ramirez (Spain) Esther San Miguel |
| +78 kg | (France) Anne-Sophie Mondière | (Russia) Tea Donguzashvili | (Germany) Franziska Konitz (Slovenia) Lucija Polavder |

=== Medal table ===
| Rank | Nation | Gold | Silver | Bronze | Total |
|---|---|---|---|---|---|
| 1 | Netherlands (NED) | 2 | 2 | 0 | 4 |
| 2 | France (FRA) | 2 | 1 | 3 | 6 |
| 3 | Austria (AUT) | 2 | 0 | 0 | 2 |
| 4 | Spain (ESP) | 1 | 3 | 1 | 5 |
| 5 | Germany (GER) | 1 | 2 | 3 | 6 |
| 6 | Russia (RUS) | 1 | 2 | 1 | 4 |
| 7 | Italy (ITA) | 1 | 1 | 1 | 3 |
| 8 | Georgia (GEO) | 1 | 0 | 3 | 4 |
| 8 | Portugal (POR) | 1 | 0 | 3 | 4 |
| 10 | Romania (ROM) | 1 | 0 | 1 | 2 |
| 11 | Belgium (BEL) | 1 | 0 | 0 | 1 |
| 12 | Hungary (HUN) | 0 | 1 | 2 | 3 |
| 13 | Azerbaijan (AZE) | 0 | 1 | 1 | 2 |
| 14 | Poland (POL) | 0 | 1 | 0 | 1 |
| 15 | Slovenia (SVN) | 0 | 0 | 3 | 3 |
| 16 | Belarus (BLR) | 0 | 0 | 2 | 2 |
| 16 | Israel (ISR) | 0 | 0 | 2 | 2 |
| 18 | Greece (GRE) | 0 | 0 | 1 | 1 |
| 18 | Ukraine (UKR) | 0 | 0 | 1 | 1 |
| Totals (19 entries) | | 14 | 14 | 28 | 56 |

== Results overview ==
=== Men ===
==== −60 kg ====
| Position | Judoka | Country |
|---|---|---|
| 1. | Ludwig Paischer | Austria |
| 2. | Ruben Houkes | Netherlands |
| 3. | Lavrentis Alexanidis | Greece |
| 3. | Nestor Khergiani | Georgia |
| 5. | Ruslan Kishmakov | Russia |
| 5. | Gal Yekutiel | Israel |
| 7. | Hovhannes Davtyan | Armenia |
| 7. | Pavel Petřikov | Czech Republic |

==== −66 kg ====
| Position | Judoka | Country |
|---|---|---|
| 1. | Zaza Kedelashvili | Georgia |
| 2. | Miklós Ungvári | Hungary |
| 3. | Pedro Dias | Portugal |
| 3. | Alim Gadanov | Russia |
| 5. | Sébastien Berthelot | France |
| 5. | Dex Elmont | Netherlands |
| 7. | Ramil Gasimov | Azerbaijan |
| 7. | Armen Nazaryan | Armenia |

==== −73 kg ====
| Position | Judoka | Country |
|---|---|---|
| 1. | Dirk Van Tichelt | Belgium |
| 2. | Kiyoshi Uematsu | Spain |
| 3. | Ákos Braun | Hungary |
| 3. | David Kevkhishvili | Georgia |
| 5. | Jaromír Ježek | Czech Republic |
| 5. | Marco Maddaloni | Italy |
| 7. | Mitar Mrdić | Bosnia and Herzegovina |
| 7. | Kanstantsin Siamionau | Belarus |

==== −81 kg ====
| Position | Judoka | Country |
|---|---|---|
| 1. | João Neto | Portugal |
| 2. | Guillaume Elmont | Netherlands |
| 3. | Mikalai Barkouski | Belarus |
| 3. | Giuseppe Maddaloni | Italy |
| 5. | Konstantins Ovcinnikovs | Latvia |
| 5. | Avisar Sheinmann | Israel |
| 7. | Giorgi Baindurashvili | Georgia |
| 7. | Aleksei Budõlin | Estonia |

==== −90 kg ====
| Position | Judoka | Country |
|---|---|---|
| 1. | Mark Huizinga | Netherlands |
| 2. | Elkhan Mammadov | Azerbaijan |
| 3. | Andrei Kazusionak | Belarus |
| 3. | Irakli Tsirekidze | Georgia |
| 5. | David Alarza | Spain |
| 5. | Roberto Meloni | Italy |
| 7. | Matthieu Dafreville | France |
| 7. | Hugo Silva | Portugal |

==== −100 kg ====
| Position | Judoka | Country |
|---|---|---|
| 1. | Henk Grol | Netherlands |
| 2. | Przemysław Matyjaszek | Poland |
| 3. | Benjamin Behrla | Germany |
| 3. | Ariel Ze'evi | Israel |
| 5. | Peter Cousins | Great Britain |
| 5. | Christophe Humbert | France |
| 7. | João Taveira | Portugal |
| 7. | Egidijus Žilinskas | Lithuania |

==== +100 kg ====
| Position | Judoka | Country |
|---|---|---|
| 1. | Tamerlan Tmenov | Russia |
| 2. | Paolo Bianchessi | Italy |
| 3. | Pierre Robin | France |
| 3. | Yevgen Sotnikov | Ukraine |
| 5. | Lasha Gujejiani | Georgia |
| 5. | Yury Rybak | Belarus |
| 7. | Marius Paškevičius | Lithuania |
| 7. | Janusz Wojnarowicz | Poland |

=== Women ===
==== −48 kg ====
| Position | Judoka | Country |
|---|---|---|
| 1. | Alina Alexandra Dumitru | Romania |
| 2. | Frédérique Jossinet | France |
| 3. | Éva Csernoviczki | Hungary |
| 3. | Ana Hormigo | Portugal |
| 5. | Liudmila Bogdanova | Russia |
| 5. | Volha Leshchanka | Belarus |
| 7. | Vanesa Comeron | Spain |
| 7. | Valentina Moscatt | Italy |

==== −52 kg ====
| Position | Judoka | Country |
|---|---|---|
| 1. | Ana Carrascosa | Spain |
| 2. | Romy Tarangul | Germany |
| 3. | Ioana Dinea | Romania |
| 3. | Petra Nareks | Slovenia |
| 5. | Audery La Rizza | France |
| 5. | Georgina Singleton | Great Britain |
| 7. | Ilse Heylen | Belgium |
| 7. | Jaana Sundberg | Finland |

==== −57 kg ====
| Position | Judoka | Country |
|---|---|---|
| 1. | Sabrina Filzmoser | Austria |
| 2. | Isabel Fernández | Spain |
| 3. | Kifayat Gasimova | Azerbaijan |
| 3. | Barbara Harel | France |
| 5. | Radmila Perišić | Serbia |
| 5. | Giulia Quintavalle | Italy |
| 7. | Corina Caprioriu | Romania |
| 7. | Joana Ramos | Portugal |

==== −63 kg ====
| Position | Judoka | Country |
|---|---|---|
| 1. | Lucie Décosse | France |
| 2. | Claudia Malzahn | Germany |
| 3. | Alice Schlesinger | Israel |
| 3. | Urška Žolnir | Slovenia |
| 5. | Ioulietta Boukouvala | Greece |
| 5. | Sarah Clark | Great Britain |
| 7. | Marijana Miskovic | Croatia |
| 7. | Andrea Pokorna | Czech Republic |

==== −70 kg ====
| Position | Judoka | Country |
|---|---|---|
| 1. | Ylenia Scapin | Italy |
| 2. | Leire Iglesias | Spain |
| 3. | Gévrise Émane | France |
| 3. | Kerstin Thiele | Germany |
| 5. | Yulia Kuzina | Russia |
| 5. | Anett Meszaros | Hungary |
| 7. | Catherine Jacques | Belgium |
| 7. | Raša Sraka | Slovenia |

==== −78 kg ====
| Position | Judoka | Country |
|---|---|---|
| 1. | Heide Wollert | Germany |
| 2. | Vera Moskalyuk | Russia |
| 3. | Yahima Ramirez | Portugal |
| 3. | Esther San Miguel | Spain |
| 5. | Sviatlana Tsimashenka | Belarus |
| 5. | Claudia Zwiers | Netherlands |
| 7. | Stéphanie Possamaï | France |
| 7. | Katarzyna Wrobel | Poland |

==== +78 kg ====
| Position | Judoka | Country |
|---|---|---|
| 1. | Anne-Sophie Mondière | France |
| 2. | Tea Donguzashvili | Russia |
| 3. | Franziska Konitz | Germany |
| 3. | Lucija Polavder | Slovenia |
| 5. | Sarah Adlington | Great Britain |
| 5. | Michela Torrenti | Italy |
| 7. | Yuliya Barysik | Belarus |
| 7. | Tsvetana Bozhilova | Bulgaria |
