= Ole Bischof =

German judoka (born 1979)

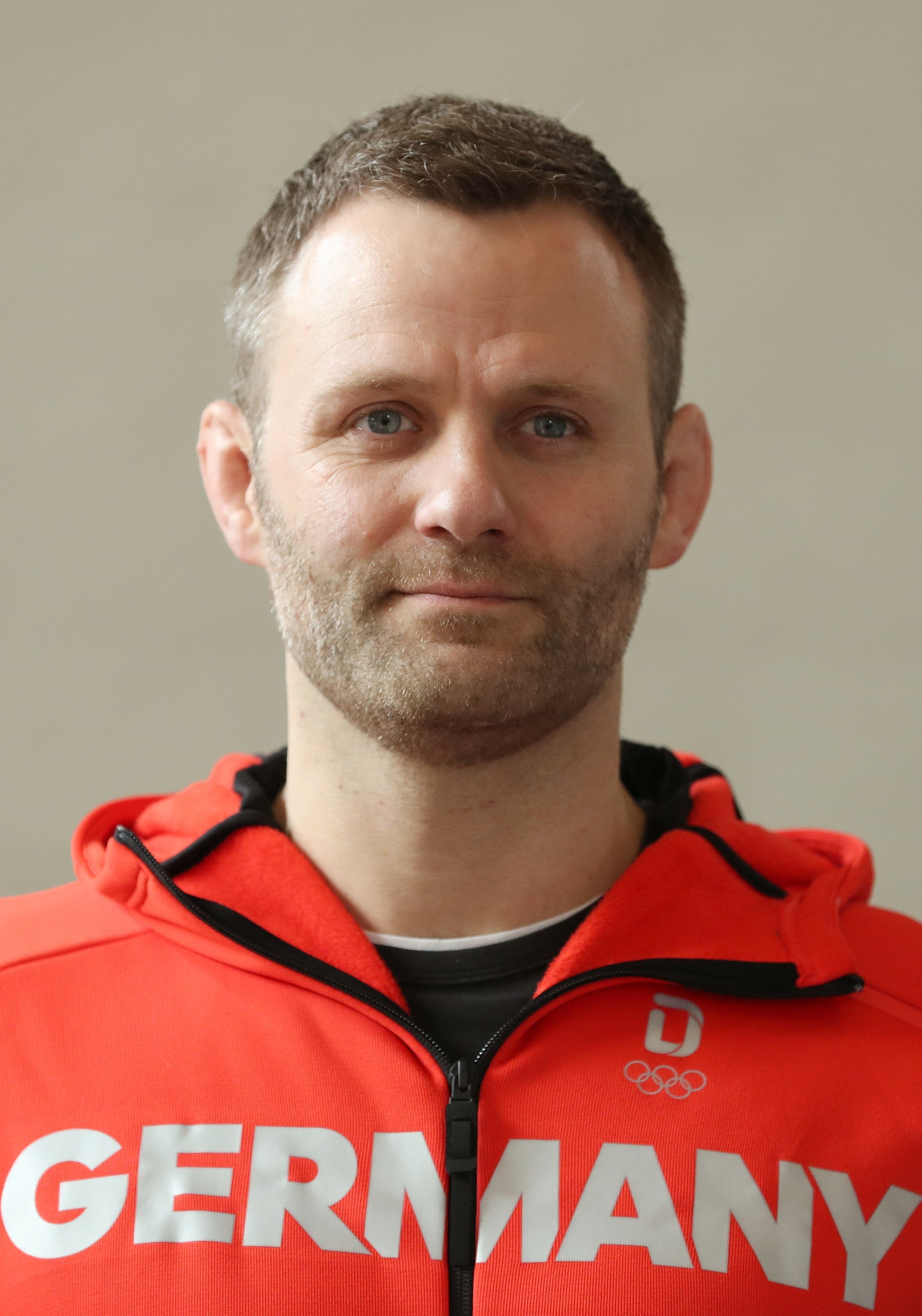
- Bischof in 2018

Personal information
- Born: 27 August 1979 (age 47) Reutlingen, West Germany
- Occupation: Judoka
- Website: Official website

Sport
- Country: Germany
- Sport: Judo
- Weight class: –81 kg

Achievements and titles
- Olympic Games: (gold) (2008)
- World Champ.: (bronze) (2009)
- European Champ.: (gold) (2005)
Medal record
Men's judo
Representing Germany
Olympic Games
Gold medal – first place	2008 Beijing	‍–‍81 kg
Silver medal – second place	2012 London	‍–‍81 kg
World Championships
Bronze medal – third place	2009 Rotterdam	‍–‍81 kg
European Championships
Gold medal – first place	2005 Rotterdam	‍–‍81 kg
Silver medal – second place	2004 Bucharest	‍–‍81 kg
Bronze medal – third place	2011 Istanbul	‍–‍81 kg
IJF Grand Slam
Gold medal – first place	2012 Paris	‍–‍81 kg
Bronze medal – third place	2009 Moscow	‍–‍81 kg
Bronze medal – third place	2010 Moscow	‍–‍81 kg
Bronze medal – third place	2011 Moscow	‍–‍81 kg
IJF Grand Prix
Gold medal – first place	2009 Tunis	‍–‍81 kg
Gold medal – first place	2010 Tunis	‍–‍81 kg
Gold medal – first place	2011 Baku	‍–‍81 kg
Gold medal – first place	2012 Düsseldorf	‍–‍81 kg
Summer Universiade
Bronze medal – third place	2003 Jeju	‍–‍81 kg

Profile at external databases
- IJF: 610
- JudoInside.com: 211
- Updated on 25 May 2023

Ole Bischof (born 27 August 1979 in Reutlingen) is a German judoka. He is trained by 1984 Olympic gold medalist Frank Wieneke.

== Biography ==
Bischof began in the TSG Reutlingen with judo. He became German champion at the age of 18 in 1997 in the age-group U21. Four years later, in 2001, he won the title of German champion in the Men's category. Following this, he won medals on more international competitions and became 2005 European champion.

Since 2001, Bischof has been competing in the team competitions for the TSV Abensberg. With the TSV Abensberg, he became team champion and 2006 European cup winner from 2002 to 2008.

For the Olympic Games 2004 in Athens, Ole was replaced Florian Wanner. Bischof was the best placed German in the world rankings, with Wanner holding the title of world champion (2003 in Osaka/Japan).

During the Olympics, Ole defeated judokas such as Tiago Camilo who was the silver medallist in Sydney 2000 and Roman Gontyuk, the silver medallist of Athens 2004. Ole won the -81 kg Olympic game by defeating Kim Jae-Bum of South Korea. In the 2012 London Olympics Bischof won the silver medal, being defeated in the final by Kim Jae-Bum. He announced his retirement in September 2012.

In 2008 he appeared on the game show Schlag den Raab. He lost to Raab 3-63.

During his career he studied economics and graduated as a Diplom Volkswirt.

== Achievements ==
Year	Tournament	Place	Weight class
2012	Summer Olympics	2nd	Half middleweight (–81 kg)
2011	European Judo Championships	3rd	Half middleweight (–81 kg)
2009	European Judo Championships	5th	Half middleweight (–81 kg)
2009	World Judo Championships	3rd	Half middleweight (–81 kg)
2008	Summer Olympics	1st	Half middleweight (–81 kg)
2007	European Judo Championships	5th	Half middleweight (–81 kg)
2006	European Judo Championships	5th	Half middleweight (–81 kg)
2005	European Judo Championships	1st	Half middleweight (–81 kg)
2004	European Judo Championships	2nd	Half middleweight (–81 kg)
2003	Universiade	3rd	Half middleweight (–81 kg)
