= Mitar Mrdić =

Bosnian judoka (born 1984)

Mitar Mrdić (born 7 February 1984 in Trebinje) is a Bosnian judoka.

== Achievements ==
Year	Tournament	Place	Weight class
2008	European Championships	7th	Lightweight (73 kg)
