= Daniel Fernández (judoka) =

Belgian judoka (born 1985)

Medal record

Men's judo

European Championships
Bronze medal – third place	2005 Rotterdam	73 kg

Daniel Fernández (born 4 February 1985) is a Belgian judoka.

== Achievements ==
Year	Tournament	Place	Weight class
2005	European Judo Championships	3rd	Lightweight (73 kg)
