= Yamila Zambrano =

Cuban judoka (born 1986)

Personal information
- Full name: Yamila Zambrano Cuencha
- Nationality: Cuba
- Born: 10 February 1986 (age 40) Havana, Cuba
- Height: 1.57 m (5 ft 2 in)
- Weight: 48 kg (106 lb)

Sport
- Sport: Judo
- Event: 48 kg

Yamila Zambrano Cuencha (born February 10, 1986, in Havana) is a Cuban judoka who competed in the women's extra-lightweight category. She captured a gold medal in the 48-kg division at the 2004 Pan American Judo Championships in Margarita Island, Venezuela.

She competed in the 48 kg) at the 2004 Summer Olympics in Athens. She placed first place at the Pan American Judo Championships in Margarita Island, Venezuela. She lost her opening match to Algeria's Soraya Haddad, who successfully scored an ippon, and threw her into the tatami with a kuchiki taoshi (single leg takedown) assault at one minute and fifty-four seconds.
