= Craig Fallon =

British judoka (1982–2019)

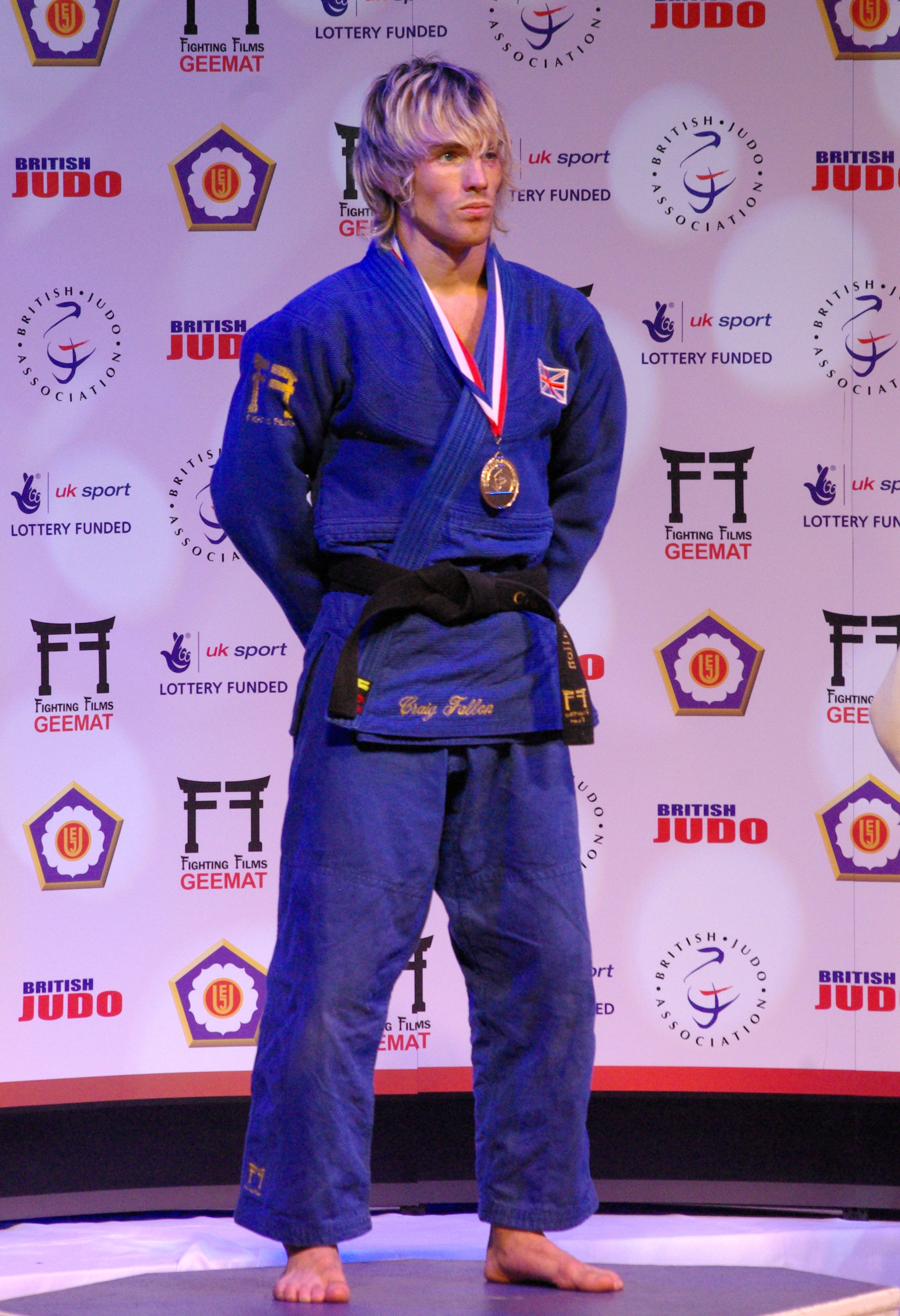
- Fallon in 2008

Personal information
- Nationality: British
- Born: Craig Patrick Fallon; 18 December 1982 Ipswich, Suffolk, England
- Died: 15 July 2019 (aged 36) Wellington, Shropshire, England
- Occupation: Judoka

Sport
- Sport: Judo
- Weight class: –60 kg

Achievements and titles
- Olympic Games: 7th (2008)
- World Champ.: (gold) (2005)
- European Champ.: (gold) (2006)
Medal record
Men's Judo
Representing Great Britain
World Championships
| Gold medal – first place | 2005 Cairo | –60 kg |
| Silver medal – second place | 2003 Osaka | –60 kg |
European Championships
| Gold medal – first place | 2006 Tampere | –60 kg |
| Silver medal – second place | 2003 Düsseldorf | –60 kg |
European U23 Championships
| Gold medal – first place | 2004 Ljubljana | –60 kg |
European Junior Championships
| Silver medal – second place | 2001 Budapest | –60 kg |
Representing England
Commonwealth Games
| Gold medal – first place | 2002 Manchester | –60kg |

Profile at external databases
- IJF: 2835
- JudoInside.com: 11412
- Updated on 12 February 2022

Craig Patrick Fallon (18 December 1982 – 15 July 2019) was a British World Champion judoka.

== Career ==
His first main coach was Bill Kelly. At aged 14, Fallon moved to the Hardy Spicer Judo Club in Birmingham, who he represented for the remainder of his career with his coach Fitzroy Davis. In 2002, he won the gold medal in the under 60kg category at the 2002 Commonwealth Games in Manchester.

In September 2005, Fallon won the -60 kg weight class at the World Judo Championships in Cairo, beating Ludwig Paischer in the final. He became only the third British male to win a world title, following Neil Adams in 1981 and Graeme Randall in 1999. The following year in 2006, he went on to become European champion in Tampere, Finland in the -60 kg weight category beating Armen Nazaryan in the final. He is only the second male British judoka besides Neil Adams to simultaneously hold both a World and European title.

On 22 September 2007, Fallon went on to win The 2007 Men's World Cup in the -60 kg at the NIA Arena in Birmingham, he was the only Brit to win a medal at the Olympic ranking event. In 2011 Fallon won his third title at the British Judo Championships, having previously won in 2002 and 2008.

In 2012, the former Wolverhampton Judo Club ace was inducted into the Wolverhampton Sporting Hall of Fame.

In 2017, Fallon signed a contract as head coach of the Federal Judo Association of Vorarlberg, Austria. In 2019, Fallon made the move to Welsh Judo Association to become Head of Coaching.

== Death ==
Fallon died on 15 July 2019. His body was found at the Wrekin, a beauty spot near Wellington in Shropshire. No cause of death was given. The coroner at the inquest judged that Fallon had died by suicide.
