= João Taveira =

Portuguese judoka

João Taveira (born 22 December 1984) is a Portuguese judoka. He won the Kiyoshi Kobayashi Coimbra in 2005, 2008, and 2010. He won the Finnish Open Vantaa in 2006 and the British Open London in 2007.

== Achievements ==
Year	Tournament	Place	Weight class
2008	European Championships	7th	Half heavyweight (100 kg)
