= Primoz Ferjan =

Slovenian judoka (born 1985)

Personal information
- Born: 10 February 1985 (age 41)
- Occupation: Judoka

Sport
- Sport: Judo

Profile at external databases
- JudoInside.com: 13816

Primoz Ferjan (born 10 February 1985) is a Slovenian judoka. He won several international tournaments between 2004 and 2012. He placed 7th in the 2005 World Judo Championships.
