= Mikalai Barkouski =

Belarusian judoka (born 1981)

Personal information
- Born: 18 March 1981 (age 45)
- Occupation: Judoka

Sport
- Country: Belarus
- Sport: Judo
- Weight class: –81 kg

Achievements and titles
- European Champ.: (bronze) (2008)
Medal record
Men's judo
Representing Belarus
European Championships
Bronze medal – third place	2008 Lisbon	–81 kg

Profile at external databases
- IJF: 6423
- JudoInside.com: 33505
- Updated on 16 November 2022

Mikalai Barkouski is a Belarusian judoka.

== Achievements ==
Year	Tournament	Place	Weight class
2009	European Championships	7th	Half middleweight (81 kg)
2008	European Championships	3rd	Half middleweight (81 kg)
