= Maria Karagiannopoulou =

Greek judoka

Maria Karagiannopoulou (Greek: Μαρια Καραγιαννοπουλου; born 22 September 1972 in Ludwigshafen, Germany) is a Greek judoka.

She finished in joint fifth place in the extra-lightweight (48 kg) division at the 2004 Summer Olympics, having lost the bronze medal match to Julia Matijass of Germany.
