= Denílson Lourenço =

Brazilian judoka (born 1977)

Personal information
- Full name: Denílson Moraes Lourenço
- Born: May 11, 1977 (age 49) Tupã, São Paulo
- Occupation: Judoka

Sport
- Sport: Judo
Medal record
Men's judo
Representing Brazil
Pan American Games
Silver medal – second place	1999 Winnipeg	Extra Lightweight

Profile at external databases
- JudoInside.com: 9547

Denílson Moraes Lourenço (born May 11, 1977 in Tupã, São Paulo) is a male judoka from Brazil. He won the silver medal in the men's extra-lightweight division (– 48 kg) at the 1999 Pan American Games in Winnipeg, Manitoba, Canada. He represented his native country at the 2000 Summer Olympics in Sydney, Australia.
