= Frédérique Jossinet =

French judoka (born 1975)

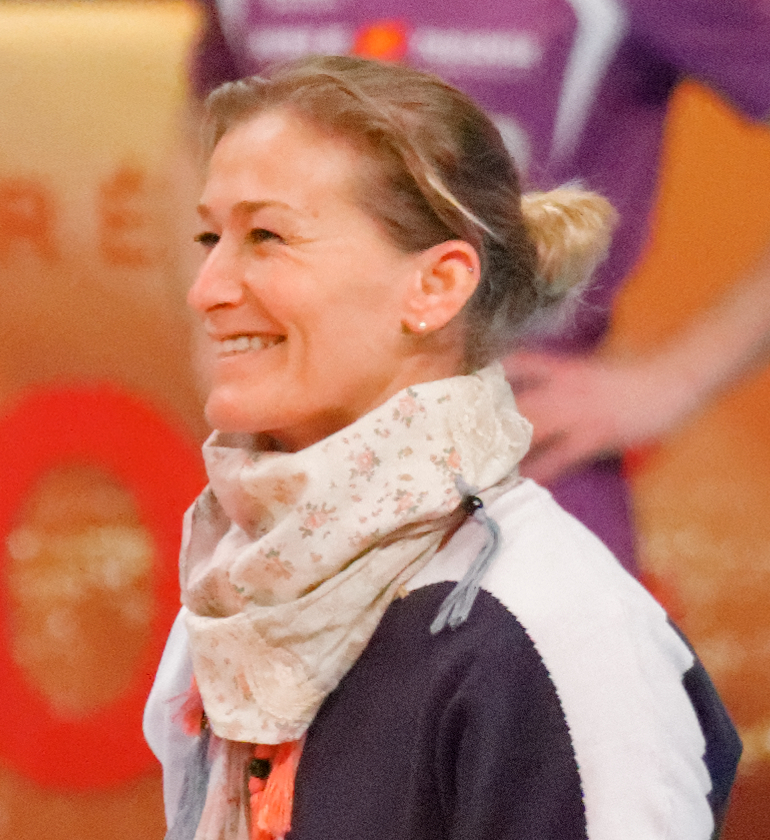
- Jossinet in 2013

Personal information
- Nationality: French
- Born: Frédérique Chantal Marthe Jossinet; 16 December 1975 (age 50)
- Occupation: Judoka

Sport
- Country: France
- Sport: Judo
- Weight class: ‍–‍48 kg
- Rank: Black belt

Achievements and titles
- Olympic Games: (silver) (2004)
- World Champ.: (silver) (2003, 2005)
- European Champ.: (gold) (2001, 2002, 2009)
Medal record
Women's judo
Representing France
Olympic Games
Silver medal – second place	2004 Athens	‍–‍48 kg
World Championships
Gold medal – first place	2006 Paris	Women's team
Silver medal – second place	2003 Osaka	‍–‍48 kg
Silver medal – second place	2005 Cairo	‍–‍48 kg
Bronze medal – third place	2007 Rio de Janeiro	‍–‍48 kg
Bronze medal – third place	2009 Rotterdam	‍–‍48 kg
European Championships
Gold medal – first place	1996 Saint Petersburg	Women's team
Gold medal – first place	1997 Rome	Women's team
Gold medal – first place	2001 Paris	‍–‍48 kg
Gold medal – first place	2002 Maribor	‍–‍48 kg
Gold medal – first place	2009 Tbilisi	‍–‍48 kg
Silver medal – second place	2005 Rotterdam	‍–‍48 kg
Silver medal – second place	2008 Lisbon	‍–‍48 kg
Bronze medal – third place	2004 Bucharest	‍–‍48 kg
Bronze medal – third place	2006 Tampere	‍–‍48 kg
Bronze medal – third place	2007 Belgrade	‍–‍48 kg
Bronze medal – third place	2011 Istanbul	‍–‍48 kg
IJF Grand Slam
Gold medal – first place	2009 Rio de Janeiro	‍–‍48 kg
Silver medal – second place	2009 Paris	‍–‍48 kg
Silver medal – second place	2010 Paris	‍–‍48 kg
Silver medal – second place	2010 Rio de Janeiro	‍–‍48 kg
Bronze medal – third place	2011 Moscow	‍–‍48 kg
IJF Grand Prix
Bronze medal – third place	2009 Hamburg	‍–‍48 kg
Bronze medal – third place	2011 Abu Dhabi	‍–‍48 kg
European Junior Championships
Silver medal – second place	1993 Arnhem	‍–‍48 kg
Bronze medal – third place	1992 Jerusalem	‍–‍48 kg
Summer Universiade
Bronze medal – third place	1999 Palma de Mallorca	‍–‍48 kg
Bronze medal – third place	2001 Beijing	‍–‍48 kg

Profile at external databases
- IJF: 410
- JudoInside.com: 366
- Updated on 30 May 2023

Frédérique Chantal Marthe Jossinet (born 16 December 1975 in Rosny-sous-Bois) is a French Olympic judoka in the lightest (less than 48 kg) class.

== Awards ==
=== Olympic games ===
- 2004 Olympic Games in Athens, Greece:
  - Silver medal in the -48 kg class.

=== World Judo Championships ===
- 2003 World Judo Championships in Osaka, Japan:
  - Silver medal in the -48 kg class.
- 2005 World Judo Championships in Cairo, Egypt:
  - Silver medal in the -48 kg class.
- 2007 World Judo Championships in Rio de Janeiro, Brazil:
  - Bronze medal in the -48 kg class.
- 2009 World Judo Championships in Rotterdam, Netherlands:
  - Bronze medal in the -48 kg class.

=== European Judo Championships ===
Category/Year	2001	2002	2003	2004	2005	2006	2007
-48 kg super-light weight	1st	1st	3rd	2nd	3rd	3rd	2nd

=== Other ===
Team:

- Gold medal at the world championships team in 2006.
- Gold medal at the European Championships team in 1997 and 1996.

Club:

- European Club Cup in 2000

Tournoi de Paris :

- 10 podium finishes including 3 wins.

== Honours ==
Orders

- Knight of the Legion of Honour: 2020
