= Julia Matijass =

German judoka (born 1973)

Personal information
- Born: 22 September 1973 (age 53)
- Occupation: Judoka

Sport
- Country: Germany
- Sport: Judo
- Weight class: ‍–‍48 kg

Achievements and titles
- Olympic Games: (bronze) (2004)
- World Champ.: 5th (2003)
- European Champ.: (bronze) (2000)
Medal record
Women's judo
Representing Germany
Olympic Games
Bronze medal – third place	2004 Athens	‍–‍48 kg
European Championships
Bronze medal – third place	2000 Wrocław	‍–‍48 kg

Profile at external databases
- IJF: 52926
- JudoInside.com: 265
- Updated on 30 May 2023

Julia Matijass (born 22 September 1973 in Lyubino, Soviet Union) is a German judoka. She was a member of the Russian national judo team until 1994, and received a German citizenship in 1999.

Matijass won a bronze medal in the extra-lightweight (‍–‍48 kg) division at the 2004 Summer Olympics.
