= Gao Feng (judoka) =

Chinese judoka (born 1982)

Personal information
- Born: 2 February 1982 (age 44)
- Occupation: Judoka

Sport
- Country: China
- Sport: Judo
- Weight class: –48 kg

Achievements and titles
- Olympic Games: (bronze) (2004)
- World Champ.: 5th (2003)
- Asian Champ.: (gold) (2006)
Medal record
Women's judo
Representing China
Olympic Games
Bronze medal – third place	2004 Athens	‍–‍48 kg
Asian Games
Gold medal – first place	2006 Doha	‍–‍48 kg
World Juniors Championships
Bronze medal – third place	2000 Nabeul	‍–‍48 kg

Profile at external databases
- IJF: 52923
- JudoInside.com: 13205
- Updated on 30 May 2023

Gao Feng (Chinese: 高峰; pinyin: Gāo Fēng; born 2 February 1982 in Liaoning) is a female Chinese judoka who competed in the 2004 Summer Olympics and won a bronze medal in the extra-lightweight (‍–‍48 kg) class.
