= 2005 World Judo Championships =

Judo competition

Judo 2005 World Judo Championships
- Venue: Cairo Stadium Indoor Halls Complex
- Location: Cairo, Egypt
- Dates: 8–12 September 2005
- Competitors: 579 from 93 nations

Champions
- Men's team: South Korea
- Women's team: France

Competition at external databases
- Links: IJF • JudoInside

The 2005 World Judo Championships were the 24th edition of the Judo World Championships, and were held in Cairo, Egypt from September 8 to September 12, 2005. Brazilian João Derly was voted as best performance of the championship. On the last day of competition, team events were held, as South Korea won the men's team event and France won the women's.

== Medal overview ==
=== Men ===
Event	Gold	Silver	Bronze
Extra-lightweight (60 kg)	Craig Fallon (GBR)	Ludwig Paischer (AUT)	Cho Nam-Suk (KOR)
Extra-lightweight (60 kg)	Craig Fallon (GBR)	Ludwig Paischer (AUT)	Nijat Shikhalizade (AZE)
Half-lightweight (66 kg)	João Derly (BRA)	Masato Uchishiba (JPN)	Arash Miresmaili (IRI)
Half-lightweight (66 kg)	João Derly (BRA)	Masato Uchishiba (JPN)	Miklós Ungvári (HUN)
Lightweight (73 kg)	Ákos Braun (HUN)	Francesco Bruyere (ITA)	Kiyoshi Uematsu (ESP)
Lightweight (73 kg)	Ákos Braun (HUN)	Francesco Bruyere (ITA)	Gennadiy Bilodid (UKR)
Half-middleweight (81 kg)	Guillaume Elmont (NED)	Abderahmane Benamadi (ALG)	Takashi Ono (JPN)
Half-middleweight (81 kg)	Guillaume Elmont (NED)	Abderahmane Benamadi (ALG)	Roman Gontyuk (UKR)
Middleweight (90 kg)	Hiroshi Izumi (JPN)	Ilias Iliadis (GRE)	Mark Huizinga (NED)
Middleweight (90 kg)	Hiroshi Izumi (JPN)	Ilias Iliadis (GRE)	Andrey Kazusenok (BLR)
Half-heavyweight (100 kg)	Keiji Suzuki (JPN)	Vitaly Bubon (UKR)	Dmitri Kabanov (RUS)
Half-heavyweight (100 kg)	Keiji Suzuki (JPN)	Vitaly Bubon (UKR)	Luciano Corrêa (BRA)
Heavyweight (+100 kg)	Aleksandr Mikhailine (RUS)	Yasuyuki Muneta (JPN)	Pierre Robin (FRA)
Heavyweight (+100 kg)	Aleksandr Mikhailine (RUS)	Yasuyuki Muneta (JPN)	Lasha Gujejiani (GEO)
Openweight	Dennis van der Geest (NED)	Tamerlan Tmenov (RUS)	Juri Rybak (BLR)
Openweight	Dennis van der Geest (NED)	Tamerlan Tmenov (RUS)	Yohei Takai (JPN)
Men's team	South Korea (KOR)	Japan (JPN)	Georgia (GEO)
Men's team	South Korea (KOR)	Japan (JPN)	Brazil (BRA)

=== Women ===
Event	Gold	Silver	Bronze
Extra-lightweight (48 kg)	Yanet Bermoy (CUB)	Frédérique Jossinet (FRA)	Alina Dumitru (ROM)
Extra-lightweight (48 kg)	Yanet Bermoy (CUB)	Frédérique Jossinet (FRA)	Soraya Haddad (ALG)
Half-lightweight (52 kg)	Li Ying (CHN)	Yuki Yokosawa (JPN)	An Kum-ae (PRK)
Half-lightweight (52 kg)	Li Ying (CHN)	Yuki Yokosawa (JPN)	Telma Monteiro (POR)
Lightweight (57 kg)	Kye Sun-hui (PRK)	Yvonne Bönisch (GER)	Sabrina Filzmoser (AUT)
Lightweight (57 kg)	Kye Sun-hui (PRK)	Yvonne Bönisch (GER)	Khishigbatyn Erdenet-Od (MGL)
Half-middleweight (63 kg)	Lucie Décosse (FRA)	Ayumi Tanimoto (JPN)	Driulis González (CUB)
Half-middleweight (63 kg)	Lucie Décosse (FRA)	Ayumi Tanimoto (JPN)	Urška Žolnir (SLO)
Middleweight (70 kg)	Edith Bosch (NED)	Gévrise Émane (FRA)	Catherine Jacques (BEL)
Middleweight (70 kg)	Edith Bosch (NED)	Gévrise Émane (FRA)	Raša Sraka (SLO)
Half-heavyweight (78 kg)	Yurisel Laborde (CUB)	Sae Nakazawa (JPN)	Claudia Zwiers (NED)
Half-heavyweight (78 kg)	Yurisel Laborde (CUB)	Sae Nakazawa (JPN)	Céline Lebrun (FRA)
Heavyweight (+78 kg)	Tong Wen (CHN)	Karina Bryant (GBR)	Anne-Sophie Mondière (FRA)
Heavyweight (+78 kg)	Tong Wen (CHN)	Karina Bryant (GBR)	Maki Tsukada (JPN)
Openweight	Midori Shintani (JPN)	Karina Bryant (GBR)	Carola Uilenhoed (NED)
Openweight	Midori Shintani (JPN)	Karina Bryant (GBR)	Anne-Sophie Mondière (FRA)
Women's team	France (FRA)	South Korea (KOR)	Japan (JPN) (25x17px)
Women's team	France (FRA)	South Korea (KOR)	Algeria (ALG) (25x17px)

=== Medal table ===
Rank	Nation	Gold	Silver	Bronze	Total
1	Japan	3	5	3	11
2	Netherlands	3	0	3	6
3	Cuba	2	0	1	3
4	China	2	0	0	2
5	France	1	2	4	7
6	Great Britain	1	2	0	3
7	Russia	1	1	1	3
8	Brazil	1	0	1	2
8	Hungary	1	0	1	2
8	North Korea	1	0	1	2
11	Ukraine	0	1	2	3
12	Algeria	0	1	1	2
12	Austria	0	1	1	2
14	Germany	0	1	0	1
14	Greece	0	1	0	1
14	Italy	0	1	0	1
17	Belarus	0	0	2	2
17	Slovenia	0	0	2	2
19	Azerbaijan	0	0	1	1
19	Belgium	0	0	1	1
19	Georgia	0	0	1	1
19	Iran	0	0	1	1
19	Mongolia	0	0	1	1
19	Portugal	0	0	1	1
19	Romania	0	0	1	1
19	South Korea	0	0	1	1
19	Spain	0	0	1	1
Totals (27 entries)		16	16	32	64

== Results overview ==
=== Men ===
==== 60 kg ====
Position	Judoka
1.	Craig Fallon (GBR)
2.	Ludwig Paischer (AUT)
3.	Cho Nam-Suk (KOR)
3.	Nijat Shikhalizade (AZE)
5.	Salamat Utarbajew (KAZ)
5.	Revazi Zintiridis (GRE)
7.	Gal Yekutiel (ISR)
7.	David Larose (FRA)

==== 66 kg ====
Position	Judoka
1.	João Derly (BRA)
2.	Masato Uchishiba (JPN)
3.	Arash Miresmaili (IRI)
3.	Miklós Ungvári (HUN)
5.	Óscar Peñas (ESP)
5.	David Margoshvili (GEO)
7.	Dex Elmont (NED)
7.	Amin El Hady (EGY)

==== 73 kg ====
Position	Judoka
1.	Ákos Braun (HUN)
2.	Francesco Bruyere (ITA)
3.	Kiyoshi Uematsu (ESP)
3.	Gennadiy Bilodid (UKR)
5.	Claudiu Baștea (ROM)
5.	Henri Schoeman (NED)
7.	Krzysztof Wilkomirski (POL)
7.	Leandro Guilheiro (BRA)

==== 81 kg ====
Position	Judoka
1.	Guillaume Elmont (NED)
2.	Abderahmane Benamadi (ALG)
3.	Takashi Ono (JPN)
3.	Roman Gontyuk (UKR)
5.	Anthony Rodriguez (FRA)
5.	Kim Min-Kyu (KOR)
7.	Aleksei Budõlin (EST)
7.	Dmitri Nossov (RUS)

==== 90 kg ====
Position	Judoka
1.	Hiroshi Izumi (JPN)
2.	Ilias Iliadis (GRE)
3.	Mark Huizinga (NED)
3.	Andrey Kazusenok (BLR)
5.	Przemysław Matyjaszek (POL)
5.	Hisham Mesbah (EGY)
7.	Khasanbi Taov (RUS)
7.	Maxim Rakov (KAZ)

==== 100 kg ====
Position	Judoka
1.	Keiji Suzuki (JPN)
2.	Vitaly Bubon (UKR)
3.	Dmitri Kabanov (RUS)
3.	Luciano Corrêa (BRA)
5.	Juri Rybak (BLR)
5.	Abbas Fallah (IRI)
7.	Dániel Hadfi (HUN)
7.	Primoz Ferjan (SLO)

==== +100 kg ====
Position	Judoka
1.	Aleksandr Mikhailine (RUS)
2.	Yasuyuki Muneta (JPN)
3.	Pierre Robin (FRA)
3.	Lasha Gujejiani (GEO)
5.	Paolo Bianchessi (ITA)
5.	Óscar Brayson (CUB)
7.	Andrian Kordon (ISR)
7.	Mohamed Reza Rodaki (IRI)

==== Open class ====
Position	Judoka
1.	Dennis van der Geest (NED)
2.	Tamerlan Tmenov (RUS)
3.	Juri Rybak (BLR)
3.	Yohei Takai (JPN)
5.	Jang Sung-ho (KOR)
5.	Georgi Kizilashvili (GEO)
7.	Abdullo Tangriev (UZB)
7.	Martin Padar (EST)

==== Men's team ====
Position	Country
1.	South Korea (KOR)
2.	Japan (JPN)
3.	Georgia (GEO)
3.	Brazil (BRA)
5.	France (FRA)
5.	Egypt (EGY)
7.	Oceania (OCE)
7.	Algeria (ALG)

=== Women ===
==== 48 kg ====
Position	Judoka
1.	Yanet Bermoy (CUB)
2.	Frédérique Jossinet (FRA)
3.	Alina Dumitru (ROM)
3.	Soraya Haddad (ALG)
5.	Ann Simons (BEL)
5.	Pak Ok-Song (PRK)
7.	Gereltuya Erdenechimeg (MGL)
7.	Kayo Kitada (JPN)

==== 52 kg ====
Position	Judoka
1.	Li Ying (CHN)
2.	Yuki Yokosawa (JPN)
3.	An Kum-ae (PRK)
3.	Telma Monteiro (POR)
5.	Ioana Aluas (ROM)
5.	Ludmila Bogdanova (RUS)
7.	Zaimaris Calderon (CUB)
7.	Mönkhbaataryn Bundmaa (MGL)

==== 57 kg ====
Position	Judoka
1.	Kye Sun-hui (PRK)
2.	Yvonne Bönisch (GER)
3.	Sabrina Filzmoser (AUT)
3.	Khishigbatyn Erdenet-Od (MGL)
5.	Isabel Fernández (ESP)
5.	Yurisleidy Lupetey (CUB)
7.	Inga Gołaszewska-Kołodziej (POL)
7.	Fanny Riaboff (FRA)

==== 63 kg ====
Position	Judoka
1.	Lucie Décosse (FRA)
2.	Ayumi Tanimoto (JPN)
3.	Driulis González (CUB)
3.	Urška Žolnir (SLO)
5.	Anna von Harnier (GER)
5.	Marie-Hélène Chisholm (CAN)
7.	Elisabeth Willeboordse (NED)
7.	Lee Bok-Hee (KOR)

==== 70 kg ====
Position	Judoka
1.	Edith Bosch (NED)
2.	Gévrise Émane (FRA)
3.	Catherine Jacques (BEL)
3.	Raša Sraka (SLO)
5.	Annett Böhm (GER)
5.	Maryna Pryshchepa (UKR)
7.	Sagat Abikeeva (KAZ)
7.	Bae Eun-Hye (KOR)

==== 78 kg ====
Position	Judoka
1.	Yurisel Laborde (CUB)
2.	Sae Nakazawa (JPN)
3.	Claudia Zwiers (NED)
3.	Céline Lebrun (FRA)
5.	Lucia Morico (ITA)
5.	Marianne Morawek (AUT)
7.	Amy Cotton (CAN)
7.	Rachel Wilding (GBR)

==== +78 kg ====
Position	Judoka
1.	Tong Wen (CHN)
2.	Karina Bryant (GBR)
3.	Anne-Sophie Mondière (FRA)
3.	Maki Tsukada (JPN)
5.	Tea Donguzashvili (RUS)
5.	Carola Uilenhoed (NED)
7.	Giovanna Blanco (VEN)
7.	Jeong Ji-Won (KOR)

==== Open class ====
Position	Judoka
1.	Midori Shintani (JPN)
2.	Karina Bryant (GBR)
3.	Carola Uilenhoed (NED)
3.	Anne-Sophie Mondière (FRA)
5.	Yuliya Barysik (BLR)
5.	Lucija Polavder (SLO)
7.	Tsvetana Bozhilova (BUL)
7.	Verena Birndorfer (GER)

==== Women's team ====
Position	Country
1.	France (FRA)
2.	South Korea (KOR)
3.	Japan (JPN)
3.	Algeria (ALG)
5.	China (CHN)
5.	Oceania (OCE)
7.	Cuba (CUB)
7.	Egypt (EGY)
