= Judo at the 2012 Summer Olympics – Qualification =

Judo competition

Qualification for judo at the Games of the XXX Olympiad

Qualification for Judo at the 2012 Summer Olympics was based on the world ranking list prepared by the International Judo Federation on 10 May 2012. The top 22 men or 14 women from the world rankings in each division qualify, subject to a limit of 1 judoka per National Olympic Committee (NOC) per division. Further continental quotas (Europe 25, Africa 24, Pan-America 21, Asia 20 and Oceania 10 across both sexes and all divisions) also qualify subject to an overall limit of 1 judoka per NOC and 2 judokas per division from each continent. The qualification is allocated to the athlete.

== Qualification summary ==
NOC	Men							Women							Total
NOC	-60kg	-66kg	-73kg	-81kg	-90kg	-100kg	+100kg	-48kg	-52kg	-57kg	-63kg	-70kg	-78kg	+78kg	Total
Afghanistan		X													1
Albania									X						1
Algeria									X					X	2
American Samoa						X									1
Angola												X			1
Argentina				X	X	X		X							4
Armenia	X	X													2
Aruba		X													1
Australia	X	X			X	X				X					5
Austria	X									X	X				3
Azerbaijan	X	X	X	X	X	X				X	X				8
Barbados			X												1
Belarus						X	X								2
Belgium		X	X	X		X		X	X						6
Belize		X													1
Benin	X														1
Bosnia and Herzegovina						X									1
Brazil	X	X	X	X	X	X	X	X	X	X	X	X	X	X	14
Bulgaria		X													1
Burkina Faso											X				1
Burundi													X		1
Cambodia	X														1
Cameroon					X										1
Canada	X	X	X	X	X				X		X	X			8
Chad												X			1
Cape Verde														X	1
Chile		X													1
China	X							X	X	X	X	X	X	X	8
Colombia										X		X			2
Costa Rica			X												1
Ivory Coast					X										1
Croatia				X							X				2
Cuba					X	X	X	X	X	X	X	X		X	9
Czech Republic			X	X		X									3
Djibouti										X					1
Dominican Republic									X						1
Democratic Republic of the Congo							X								1
Ecuador											X				1
Egypt		X	X		X	X	X								5
El Salvador		X													1
Estonia							X								1
Fiji				X											1
Finland	X								X		X				3
France	X	X	X	X	X	X	X	X	X	X	X	X	X	X	14
Gabon													X		1
Georgia	X	X	X	X	X	X	X								7
Germany	X		X	X	X	X	X		X	X	X	X	X		11
Ghana			X												1
Great Britain	X	X	X	X	X	X	X	X	X	X	X	X	X	X	14
Greece					X					X					2
Guam							X								1
Guatemala							X								1
Guinea							X								1
Guyana	X														1
Haiti									X						1
Honduras	X														1
Hong Kong			X												1
Hungary		X		X	X		X	X		X		X	X		8
Indonesia				X											1
India											X				1
Iceland							X								1
Independent Olympic Athletes				X											1
Iran						X	X								2
Ireland								X							1
Israel	X	X	X			X					X				5
Italy	X	X		X	X			X	X	X	X	X			9
Japan	X	X	X	X	X	X	X	X	X	X	X	X	X	X	14
Kazakhstan	X	X	X	X	X	X	X	X						X	9
Kyrgyzstan					X		X								2
Latvia				X		X	X								3
Lebanon											X				1
Liberia				X											1
Libya		X													1
Lithuania					X		X								2
Luxembourg									X						1
Madagascar				X											1
Mali						X									1
Morocco	X			X							X				3
Mexico	X													X	2
Moldova				X	X										2
Mongolia	X	X	X			X		X	X	X	X		X		9
Montenegro				X											1
Monaco	X														1
Myanmar													X		1
Nauru			X												1
Netherlands	X		X	X		X	X	X			X	X	X		9
New Zealand												X			1
Niger	X														1
North Korea									X						1
Palau											X				1
Palestine			X												1
Panama				X											1
Papua New Guinea		X													1
Paraguay		X													1
Peru	X														1
Philippines							X								1
Portugal			X						X	X			X		4
Poland		X	X				X					X	X	X	6
Puerto Rico														X	1
Romania		X				X	X	X	X	X					6
Russia	X	X	X	X	X	X	X	X	X	X			X	X	12
Rwanda			X												1
Samoa			X												1
Saudi Arabia	X													X	2
Serbia					X										1
Senegal										X					1
Seychelles						X									1
Slovakia					X										1
Slovenia		X		X			X			X	X	X	X	X	8
Solomon Islands	X														1
South Africa			X												1
South Korea	X	X	X	X	X	X	X	X	X	X	X	X	X	X	14
Spain		X	X					X	X	X		X			6
Sweden					X										1
Switzerland	X											X			2
Chinese Taipei		X													1
Tajikistan			X		X										2
Thailand						X									1
Togo				X											1
Tunisia							X					X	X	X	4
Turkey			X											X	2
Turkmenistan											X				1
United Arab Emirates		X													1
United States			X	X		X				X			X		5
Ukraine	X	X	X	X	X	X	X					X	X	X	10
Uruguay					X										1
Uzbekistan	X	X	X	X	X	X	X								7
Vanuatu							X								1
Vietnam								X							1
Venezuela	X	X													2
Yemen	X														1
Zambia				X											1
Total: 134 NOCs	37	36	34	34	30	31	32	19	22	25	23	22	21	20	388

== Men's events ==
The following is the qualification summary.

=== Extra-lightweight (60 kg) ===
Section	Places	Qualified
Host Quota	1	Ashley McKenzie (GBR)
Top 22 Nations in World Rankings	22	Rishod Sobirov (UZB); Hiroaki Hiraoka (JPN); Georgii Zantaraia (UKR); Arsen Galstyan (RUS); Choi Gwang-Hyeon (KOR); Ilgar Mushkiyev (AZE); Sofiane Milous (FRA); Tumurkhuleg Davaadorj (MGL); Hovhannes Davtyan (ARM); Betkili Shukvani (GEO); Felipe Kitadai (BRA); Jeroen Mooren (NED); Yerkebulan Kossayev (KAZ); Tobias Englmaier (GER); Sergio Pessoa (CAN); Elio Verde (ITA); Ludwig Paischer (AUT); Yassine Moudatir (MAR); A Lamusi (CHN); Arnie Dickins (AUS); Javier Guédez (VEN); Valtteri Jokinen (FIN)
Additional places (Europe)	2	Ludovic Chammartin (SUI); Artiom Arshansky (ISR)
Additional places (Africa)	2	Zakari Gourouza (NIG); Neuso Sigauque (MOZ)
Additional places (America)	2	Juan Postigos (PER); Nabor Castillo (MEX)
Additional places (Asia)	2	Eisa Majrashi (KSA); Ali Khousrof (YEM)
Additional places (Oceania)	1	Tony Lomo (SOL)
Invitational	5	Kenny Godoy (HON); Yann Siccardi (MON); Jacob Gnahoui (BEN); Raul Lall (GUY); Ratanakmony Khom (CAM)
TOTAL	37	

=== Half-lightweight (66 kg) ===
Section	Places	Qualified
Host Quota	1	Colin Oates (GBR)
Top 22 Nations in World Rankings	22	Musa Mogushkov (RUS); Tsagaanbaatar Khashbaatar (MGL); Masashi Ebinuma (JPN); Leandro Cunha (BRA); Rok Draksic (SLO); Cho Jun-Ho (KOR); David Larose (FRA); Sugoi Uriarte (ESP); Sergey Lim (KAZ); Tarlan Karimov (AZE); Miklos Ungvari (HUN); Serhiy Drebot (UKR); Ivo dos Santos (AUS); Ricardo Valderrama (VEN); Armen Nazaryan (ARM); Sasha Mehmedovic (CAN); Dan Fâșie (ROU); Francesco Faraldo (ITA); Mirzahid Farmonov (UZB); Lasha Shavdatuashvili (GEO); Golan Pollack (ISR)
Additional places (Europe)	2	Martin Ivanov (BUL); Daniel Garcia Gonzalez (AND)
Additional places (Africa)	2	Ahmed Awad (EGY); Ahmed Yousef Elkawiseh (LBA)
Additional places (America)	2	Alejandro Zúñiga (CHI); Carlos Figueroa (ESA)
Additional places (Asia)	2	Humaid Al-Derei (UAE); Tu Kai-wen (TPE)
Additional places (Oceania)	1	Raymond Ovinou (PNG)
Invitational	4	Abraham Acevedo (PAR); Ajmal Faizzada (AFG); Jayme Mata (ARU); Eddermys Sanchez (BIZ)
TOTAL	36	

=== Lightweight (73 kg) ===
Section	Places	Qualified
Host Quota	1	Daniel Williams (GBR)
Top 22 Nations in World Rankings	22	Wang Ki-chun (KOR); Riki Nakaya (JPN); Dex Elmont (NED); Mansur Isaev (RUS); Nyam-Ochir Sainjargal (MGL); Ugo Legrand (FRA); Navruz Jurakobilov (UZB); Dirk Van Tichelt (BEL); Joao Pina (POR); Bruno Mendonça (BRA); Volodymyr Soroka (UKR); Christopher Völk (GER); Nicholas Delpopolo (USA); Tomasz Adamiec (POL); Rasul Boqiev (TJK); Nicholas Tritton (CAN); Jaromir Jezek (CZE); Hussein Hafiz (EGY); Rinat Ibragimov (KAZ); Nugzar Tatalashvili (GEO); Soso Palelashvili (ISR); Kiyoshi Uematsu (ESP)
Additional places (Europe)	2	Rustam Orujov (AZE); Sezer Huysuz (TUR)
Additional places (Africa)	2	Emmanuel Nartey (GHA); Gideon van Zyl (RSA)
Additional places (America)	2	Kyle Maxwell (BAR); Osman Murillo Segura (CRC)
Additional places (Asia)	2	Cheung Chi Yip (HKG); Maher Abu Rmilah (PLE)
Additional places (Oceania)	2	Aleni Smith (SAM); Sled Dowabobo (NRU)
Invitational	1	Fred Yannick Uwase (RWA)
TOTAL	34	

=== Half-middleweight (81 kg) ===
Section	Places	Qualified
Host Quota	1	Euan Burton (GBR)
Top 22 Nations in World Rankings	22	Leandro Guilheiro (BRA); Kim Jae-Bum (KOR); Elnur Mammadli (AZE); Ole Bischof (GER); Takahiro Nakai (JPN); Ivan Nifontov (RUS); Alain Schmitt (FRA); Travis Stevens (USA); Guillaume Elmont (NED); Safouane Attaf (MAR); Srdjan Mrvaljevic (MNE); Antonio Ciano (ITA); Tomislav Marijanović (CRO); Islam Bozbayev (KAZ); Antoine Valois-Fortier (CAN); Artem Vasylenko (UKR); Avtandil Tchrikishvili (GEO); Aljaz Sedej (SLO); Emmanuel Lucenti (ARG); Joachim Bottieau (BEL); Laszlo Csoknyai (HUN); Sergiu Toma (MDA)
Additional places (Europe)	2	Jaromir Musil (CZE); Konstantins Ovchinnikovs (LAT)
Additional places (Africa)	2	Fetra Ratsimiziva (MAD); Boas Munyonga (ZAM)
Additional places (America)	2	Omar Simmonds Pea (PAN); Reginal de Windt (IOA)
Additional places (Asia)	2	Yakhyo Imamov (UZB); Putu Wiradamungga (INA)
Additional places (Oceania)	1	Josateki Naulu (FIJ)
Invitational	2	Liva Saryee (LBR); Kouami Sacha Denanyoh (TOG)
TOTAL	34	

=== Middleweight (90 kg) ===
Section	Places	Qualified
Host Quota	1	Winston Gordon (GBR)
Top 22 Nations in World Rankings	22	Ilias Iliadis (GRE); Masashi Nishiyama (JPN); Dilshod Choriev (UZB); Varlam Liparteliani (GEO); Asley González (CUB); Tiago Camilo (BRA); Kirill Denisov (RUS); Elkhan Mammadov (AZE); Marcus Nyman (SWE); Alexandre Émond (CAN); Song Dae-Nam (KOR); Roberto Meloni (ITA); Hesham Mesbah (EGY); Mark Anthony (AUS); Karolis Bauza (LTU); Milan Randl (SVK); Roman Gontiuk (UKR); Timur Bolat (KAZ); Chingiz Mamedov (KGZ); Dmitrij Gerasimenko (SRB); Christophe Lambert (GER); Romain Buffet (FRA)
Additional places (Europe)	2	Tamás Madarász (HUN); Ivan Remarenco (MDA)
Additional places (Africa)	2	Dieudonne Dolassem (CMR); Kinapeya Kone (CIV)
Additional places (America)	2	Héctor Campos (ARG); Juan Romero (URU)
Additional places (Asia)	1	Parviz Sobirov (TJK)
Additional places (Oceania)	–	–
Invitational	–	
TOTAL	30	

=== Half-heavyweight (100 kg) ===
Section	Places	Qualified
Host Quota	1	James Austin (GBR)
Top 22 Nations in World Rankings	22	Maxim Rakov (KAZ); Henk Grol (NED); Takamasa Anai (JPN); Tuvshinbayar Naidan (MGL); Ramziddin Sayidov (UZB); Tagir Khaybulaev (RUS); Ariel Ze'evi (ISR); Hwang Hee-Tae (KOR); Ramadan Darwish (EGY); Lukas Krpalek (CZE); Levan Zhorzholiani (GEO); Elco van der Geest (BEL); Jevgenijs Borodavko (LAT); Thierry Fabre (FRA); Dimitri Peters (GER); Luciano Corrêa (BRA); Amel Mekic (BIH); Oreydi Despaigne (CUB); Artem Bloshenko (UKR); Daniel Kelly (AUS); Cristian Schmidt (ARG); Elmar Gasimov (AZE)
Additional places (Europe)	2	Yauhen Biadulin (BLR); Daniel Brata (ROU)
Additional places (Africa)	2	Dominic Dugasse (SEY); Oumar Kone (MLI)
Additional places (America)	1	Kyle Vashkulat (USA)
Additional places (Asia)	2	Javad Mahjoub (IRI); Teerawat Homklin (THA)
Additional places (Oceania)	–	–
Invitational	1	Anthony Liu (ASA)
TOTAL	31	

=== Heavyweight (+100 kg) ===
Section	Places	Qualified
Host Quota	1	Christopher Sherrington (GBR)
Top 22 Nations in World Rankings	22	Teddy Riner (FRA); Andreas Toelzer (GER); Rafael Silva (BRA); Islam El Shehaby (EGY); Kim Sung-Min (KOR); Alexander Mikhaylin (RUS); Barna Bor (HUN); Óscar Brayson (CUB); Janusz Wojnarowicz (POL); Daiki Kamikawa (JPN); Marius Paskevicius (LTU); Adam Okruashvili (GEO); Ihar Makarau (BLR); Matjaz Ceraj (SLO); Stanislav Bondarenko (UKR); Luuk Verbij (NED); Mohammad Reza Roudaki (IRI); Faicel Jaballah (TUN); Vladut Simionescu (ROU); Jake Andrewartha (AUS); El Mehdi Malki (MAR); Yerzhan Shynkeyev (KAZ)
Additional places (Europe)	2	Martin Padar (EST); Tormodur Jonsson (ISL)
Additional places (Africa)	2	Cedric Mandembo (COD); Facinet Keita (GUI)
Additional places (America)	1	Darrel Castillo (GUA)
Additional places (Asia)	2	Iurii Krakovetskii (KGZ); Tomohiko Hoshina (PHI)
Additional places (Oceania)	2	Ricardo Blas Jr. (GUM); Nazario Fiakaifonu (VAN)
Invitational	–	
TOTAL	32	

== Women's events ==
=== Extra-lightweight (48 kg) ===
Section	Places	Qualified
Host Quota	1	Kelly Edwards (GBR)
Top 14 Nations in World Rankings	14	Tomoko Fukumi (JPN); Sarah Menezes (BRA); Charline Van Snick (BEL); Alina Dumitru (ROU); Urantsetseg Munkhbat (MGL); Éva Csernoviczki (HUN); Wu Shugen (CHN); Paula Pareto (ARG); Nataliya Kondratyeva (RUS); Laëtitia Payet (FRA); Oiana Blanco (ESP); Chung Jung-Yeon (KOR); Dayaris Mestre Alvarez (CUB); Elena Moretti (ITA)
Additional places (Europe)	2	Lisa Kearney (IRL); Birgit Ente (NED)
Additional places (Africa)	0	-
Additional places (America)	0	-
Additional places (Asia)	2	Alexandra Podryadova (KAZ); Van Ngoc Tu (VIE)
Additional places (Oceania)	–	–
Invitational	-	
TOTAL	19	

=== Half-lightweight (52 kg) ===
Section	Places	Qualified
Host Quota	1	Sophie Cox (GBR)
Top 14 Nations in World Rankings	14	Bundmaa Munkhbaatar (MGL); Misato Nakamura (JPN); Érika Miranda (BRA); Soraya Haddad (ALG); Majlinda Kelmendi (ALB); Natalia Kuziutina (RUS); Priscilla Gneto (FRA); Ana Carrascosa (ESP); Yanet Bermoy (CUB); Joana Ramos (POR); He Hongmei (CHN); Ilse Heylen (BEL); Romy Tarangul (GER); Andreea Chițu (ROU)
Additional places (Europe)	2	Rosalba Forciniti (ITA); Marie Muller (LUX)
Additional places (Africa)	1	Christianne Legentil (MRI)
Additional places (America)	2	Linouse Desravine (HAI); María García (DOM)
Additional places (Asia)	2	Kim Kyung-Ok (KOR); An Kum-ae (PRK)
Additional places (Oceania)	0	–
Invitational	–	
Reallocated	1	Jaana Sundberg (FIN)
TOTAL	23	

=== Lightweight (57 kg) ===
Section	Places	Qualified
Host Quota	1	Sarah Clark (GBR)
Top 14 Nations in World Rankings	14	Kaori Matsumoto (JPN); Telma Monteiro (POR); Rafaela Silva (BRA); Automne Pavia (FRA); Sabrina Filzmoser (AUT); Corina Caprioriu (ROU); Ioulietta Boukouvala (GRE); Kim Jan-Di (KOR); Giulia Quintavalle (ITA); Marti Malloy (USA); Kifayat Gasimova (AZE); Hedvig Karakas (HUN); Irina Zabludina (RUS); Miryam Roper (GER)
Additional places (Europe)	2	Vesna Đukić (SLO); Concepción Bellorín (ESP)
Additional places (Africa)	1	Hortance Diedhiou (SEN)
Additional places (America)	2	Yurisleidy Lupetey (CUB); Yadinis Amarís (COL)
Additional places (Asia)	2	Wang Hui (CHN); Sumiya Dorjsuren (MGL)
Additional places (Oceania)	1	Carli Renzi (AUS)
Invitational	1	Sally Raguib (DJI)
Reallocated	1	Joliane Melançon (CAN)
TOTAL	25	

=== Half-middleweight (63 kg) ===
Section	Places	Qualified
Host Quota	1	Gemma Howell (GBR)
Top 14 Nations in World Rankings	14	Yoshie Ueno (JPN); Gévrise Émane (FRA); Urska Zolnir (SLO); Elisabeth Willeboordse (NED); Xu Lili (CHN); Alice Schlesinger (ISR); Munkhzaya Tsedevsuren (MGL); Joung Da-Woon (KOR); Claudia Malzahn (GER); Yaritza Abel (CUB); Ramila Yusubova (AZE); Marijana Mišković (CRO); Edwige Gwend (ITA); Mariana Silva (BRA)
Additional places (Europe)	2	Hilde Drexler (AUT); Johanna Ylinen (FIN)
Additional places (Africa)	2	Severine Nebie (BUR); Rizlen Zouak (MAR)
Additional places (America)	1	Estefania García (ECU)
Additional places (Asia)	2	Garima Chaudhary (IND); Gulnar Hayytbaeva (TKM)
Additional places (Oceania)	1	Jennifer Anson (PLW)
Invitational	1	Caren Chammas (LIB)
TOTAL	24	

=== Middleweight (70 kg) ===
Section	Places	Qualified
Host Quota	1	Sally Conway (GBR)
Top 14 Nations in World Rankings	14	Lucie Décosse (FRA); Edith Bosch (NED); Haruka Tachimoto (JPN); Raša Sraka (SLO); Hwang Ye-Sul (KOR); Fei Chen (CHN); Anett Meszaros (HUN); Maria Portela (BRA); Yuri Alvear (COL); Cecilia Blanco (ESP); Juliane Robra (SUI); Onix Cortés (CUB); Houda Miled (TUN); Katarzyna Klys (POL)
Additional places (Europe)	2	Nataliya Smal (UKR); Kerstin Thiele (GER)
Additional places (Africa)	2	Antonia Moreira (ANG); Carine Ngarlemdana (CHA)
Additional places (America)	1	Kelita Zupancic (CAN)
Additional places (Asia)	0	
Additional places (Oceania)	1	Moira de Villiers (NZL)
Invitational	–	
Reallocated	1	Erica Barbieri (ITA)
TOTAL	22	

=== Half-heavyweight (78 kg) ===
Section	Places	Qualified
Host Quota	1	Gemma Gibbons (GBR)
Top 14 Nations in World Rankings	14	Mayra Aguiar (BRA); Akari Ogata (JPN); Audrey Tcheuméo (FRA); Kayla Harrison (USA); Abigél Joó (HUN); Yang Xiuli (CHN); Lkhamdegd Purevjargal (MGL); Heide Wollert (GER); Marhinde Verkerk (NED); Anamari Velensek (SLO); Jeong Gyeong-Mi (KOR); Amy Cotton (CAN); Maryna Pryshchepa (UKR); Vera Moskalyuk (RUS)
Additional places (Europe)	2	Daria Pogorzelec (POL); Yahima Ramirez (POR)
Additional places (Africa)	2	Audrey Koumba (GAB); Hana Mareghni (TUN)
Additional places (America)	0	
Additional places (Asia)	0	–
Additional places (Oceania)	0	–
Invitational	2	Odette Ntahonvukiye (BDI); Aye Aye Aung (MYA)
TOTAL	21	

=== Heavyweight (+78 kg) ===
Section	Places	Qualified
Host Quota	1	Karina Bryant (GBR)
Top 14 Nations in World Rankings	14	Tong Wen (CHN); Mika Sugimoto (JPN); Lucija Polavder (SLO); Elena Ivashchenko (RUS); Idalys Ortiz (CUB); Na-Young Kim (KOR); Maria Suelen Altheman (BRA); Gulsah Kocaturk (TUR); Anne-Sophie Mondière (FRA); Vanessa Zambotti (MEX); Gulzhan Issanova (KAZ); Urszula Sadkowska (POL); Iryna Kindzerska (UKR); Nihel Cheikh Rouhou (TUN)
Additional places (Europe)	–	–
Additional places (Africa)	2	Sonia Asselah (ALG); Adysangela Moniz (CPV)
Additional places (America)	2	Melissa Mojica (PUR); Giovanna Blanco (VEN)
Additional places (Asia)	–	–
Additional places (Oceania)	–	–
IOC Invitation	1	Wodjan Shaherkani (KSA)
TOTAL	20	
