= 2010 World Judo Championships – Men's 66 kg =

Judo competition

Judo Men's 66 kg at the 2010 World Judo Championships
- Venue: Yoyogi National Gymnasium
- Location: Tokyo, Japan
- Date: 12 September 2010
- Competitors: 74 from 55 nations

Medalists
gold medal	Junpei Morishita (1st title)	Japan
silver medal	Leandro Cunha	Brazil
bronze medal	Khashbaataryn Tsagaanbaatar	Mongolia
bronze medal	Loic Korval	France

Competition at external databases
- Links: IJF • JudoInside

The Men's -66 kg competition at the 2010 World Judo Championships was held at 12 September at the Yoyogi National Gymnasium in Tokyo, Japan. 82 competitors contested for the medals, being split in 4 Pools where the winner advanced to the medal round.

== Pool A ==
- Last 32 fights:
  - (Cyprus) Andreas Krassas 000 vs. (Serbia) Miloš Mijalković 111
  - (Russia) Musa Mogushkov 112 vs. (Barbados) Levar Arthur 000
  - (Japan) Junpei Morishita 100 vs. (Uzbekistan) Ulugbek Norkobilov 000

First Round
(Mongolia) Khashbaataryn Tsagaanbaatar	104
(Pakistan) Aiatullah	000
(Serbia) Miloš Mijalković	000
(Georgia (country)) Shalva Kardava	001
(Seychelles) Jimmy Labrosse	000
(China) Ma Duanbin	100
(Azerbaijan) Tarlan Karimov	100
(Ecuador) Israel Verdugo	000
(Russia) Musa Mogushkov	011
(Bulgaria) Martin Ivanov	000
(Venezuela) Ricardo Valderrama	000
(Armenia) Armen Nazaryan	001
(Japan) Junpei Morishita	110
(Finland) Antti Rintamaki	000
(Romania) Dan Fâșie	020
(Hong Kong) Yeung Kai Chun	000

Quarterfinals
(Mongolia) Khashbaataryn Tsagaanbaatar	020
(Georgia (country)) Shalva Kardava	000
(China) Ma Duanbin	000
(Azerbaijan) Tarlan Karimov	011
(Russia) Musa Mogushkov	001
(Armenia) Armen Nazaryan	000
(Japan) Junpei Morishita	101
(Romania) Dan Fâșie	000

Semifinals
(Mongolia) Khashbaataryn Tsagaanbaatar	101
(Azerbaijan) Tarlan Karimov	000
(Russia) Musa Mogushkov	000
(Japan) Junpei Morishita	100

Final
(Mongolia) Khashbaataryn Tsagaanbaatar	001
(Japan) Junpei Morishita	002

== Pool B ==
- Lats 32 fights:
  - (Palestine) Yazan Zahedah 000 vs. (Kyrgyzstan) Ruslan Uulu 100
  - (Poland) Tomasz Kowalski 001 vs. (Canada) Sasha Mehmedovic 000

First Round
(South Korea) Kim Joo-Jin	100
(United States) Bradford Bolen	000
(Turkmenistan) Dovletgeldi Tejenov	000
(Iran) Mohsen Ghaffar	100
(France) Loic Korval	100
(Turkey) Mehmet Durmaz	000
(Ukraine) Serhiy Drebot	100
(Kyrgyzstan) Ruslan Uulu	000
(Hungary) Miklós Ungvári	001
(Poland) Tomasz Kowalski	000
(Fiji) Samatar Obsieh	000
(Portugal) Pedro Jacinto	100
(Moldova) Victor Scvortov	000
(Kazakhstan) Dastan Ykybayev	100
(El Salvador) Carlos Figueroa	100
(Papua New Guinea) Raymond Ovinou	000

Quarterfinals
(South Korea) Kim Joo-Jin	010
(Iran) Mohsen Ghaffar	000
(France) Loic Korval	001
(Ukraine) Serhiy Drebot	000
(Hungary) Miklós Ungvári	100
(Portugal) Pedro Jacinto	000
(Kazakhstan) Dastan Ykybayev	020
(El Salvador) Carlos Figueroa	000

Semifinals
(South Korea) Kim Joo-Jin	000
(France) Loic Korval	001
(Hungary) Miklós Ungvári	101
(Kazakhstan) Dastan Ykybayev	000

Final
(France) Loic Korval	000
(Hungary) Miklós Ungvári	000

== Pool C ==
- Last 32 fights:
  - (Kazakhstan) Sergey Lim 000 vs. (Latvia) Deniss Kozlovs 100
  - (Australia) Ivo dos Santos 100 vs. (Mozambique) Bruno Luzia 000
  - (Ukraine) Sergiy Pliyev 002 vs. (Kyrgyzstan) Islam Baialinov 000

First Round
(Russia) Alim Gadanov	101
(United Kingdom) Colin Oates	000
(Armenia) Hambardzum Tonoyan	100
(Latvia) Deniss Kozlovs	000
(Georgia (country)) Mikheil Khomizuri	000
(Slovenia) Rok Drakšič	001
(Madagascar) Norbert Elie	000
(Australia) Ivo dos Santos	101
(Spain) Sugoi Uriarte	101
(Yemen) Waleed Al-Kabzari	000
(Poland) Pawel Zagrodnik	010
(France) David Larose	000
(Moldova) Nicolae Craciun	100
(South Africa) Siyabulela Mabulu	002
(Canada) Michal Popiel	100
(Ukraine) Sergiy Pliyev	001

Quarterfinals
(Russia) Alim Gadanov	011
(Armenia) Hambardzum Tonoyan	000
(Slovenia) Rok Drakšič	100
(Australia) Ivo dos Santos	000
(Spain) Sugoi Uriarte	001
(Poland) Pawel Zagrodnik	000
(Moldova) Nicolae Craciun	000
(Canada) Michal Popiel	100

Semifinals
(Russia) Alim Gadanov	101
(Slovenia) Rok Drakšič	000
(Spain) Sugoi Uriarte	101
(Canada) Michal Popiel	000

Final
(Russia) Alim Gadanov	000
(Spain) Sugoi Uriarte	011

== Pool D ==
- Last 32 fights:
  - (China) Wen Dusu 100 vs. (Thailand) Amornthep Namwiset 000
  - (United States) Kenneth Hashimoto 010 vs. (Tajikistan) Farukhruz Sobirov 000

First Round
(Mongolia) Sanjaasürengiin Miyaaragchaa	100
(Hungary) Zsolt Gorjánácz	000
(Austria) Andreas Mitterfellner	001
(South Korea) An Jeong-Hwan	000
(Chinese Taipei) Tsai Cheng-Hsien	000
(China) Wen Dusu	101
(Uzbekistan) Mirzahid Farmonov	100
(Botswana) Advent Monyatsiwa	000
(Japan) Masashi Ebinuma	111
(United States) Kenneth Hashimoto	000
(Brazil) Leandro Cunha	011
(India) Sanju Singh Irom	000
(Dominican Republic) Lwilli Santana	000
(Turkmenistan) Muhammetgeldi Baymyradov	100
(Hong Kong) Chui Chun Sing	001
(Zambia) Mathews Punza	011

Quarterfinals
(Mongolia) Sanjaasürengiin Miyaaragchaa	000
(Austria) Andreas Mitterfellner	110
(China) Wen Dusu	000
(Uzbekistan) Mirzahid Farmonov	100
(Japan) Masashi Ebinuma	000
(Brazil) Leandro Cunha	100
(Turkmenistan) Muhammetgeldi Baymyradov	000
(Zambia) Mathews Punza	100

Semifinals
(Austria) Andreas Mitterfellner	000
(Uzbekistan) Mirzahid Farmonov	001
(Brazil) Leandro Cunha	100
(Zambia) Mathews Punza	000

Final
(Uzbekistan) Mirzahid Farmonov	000
(Brazil) Leandro Cunha	010

== Repechage ==
Repechage		Third place
(Mongolia) Khashbaataryn Tsagaanbaatar	001
(Hungary) Miklós Ungvári	000	(Mongolia) Khashbaataryn Tsagaanbaatar	100
		(Spain) Sugoi Uriarte	000

Repechage		Third place
(Russia) Alim Gadanov	001
(Uzbekistan) Mirzahid Farmonov	110	(Uzbekistan) Mirzahid Farmonov	000
		(France) Loic Korval	001

== Finals ==
Semi-finals
(Japan) Junpei Morishita	000
(France) Loic Korval	000
(Spain) Sugoi Uriarte	000
(Brazil) Leandro Cunha	101

Final
(Japan) Junpei Morishita	100
(Brazil) Leandro Cunha	000
