= 2011 World Judo Championships – Men's 66 kg =

Judo competition

Judo Men's 66 kg at the 2011 World Judo Championships
- Venue: Accor Arena
- Location: Paris, France
- Date: 23 August 2011
- Competitors: 81 from 61 nations

Medalists
gold medal	Masashi Ebinuma (1st title)	Japan
silver medal	Leandro Cunha	Brazil
bronze medal	Cho Jun-Ho	South Korea
bronze medal	Musa Mogushkov	Russia

Competition at external databases
- Links: IJF • JudoInside

The men's 66 kg competition of the 2011 World Judo Championships was held on August 23.

== Medalists ==
Gold	Silver	Bronze
Masashi Ebinuma (JPN)	Leandro Cunha (BRA)	Cho Jun-Ho (KOR); Musa Mogushkov (RUS)

== Results ==
=== Pool A ===
First round fights

	Score	
Khashbaataryn Tsagaanbaatar (Mongolia)	110–000	(India) Manjeet Nandal
Vladimir Oleinic (Moldova)	000–010	(South Korea) Cho Jun-Ho
Masashi Ebinuma (Japan)	001–000	(Kyrgyzstan) Islam Baialinov
Francis Mbida Obama (Cameroon)	000–100	(France) Pierre Duprat

Second Round
(Mongolia) Khashbaataryn Tsagaanbaatar	010
(China) Liu Renwang	000
(Georgia (country)) David Asumbani	010
(Czech Republic) David Dubsky	000
(Peru) Alonso Wong	000
(Finland) Niko-Tapio Niemela	011
(Barbados) Asa Weithers	000
(South Korea) Cho Jun-Ho	110
(Japan) Masashi Ebinuma	110
(United States) Bradford Bolen	000
(Australia) Steven Brown	002
(Cape Verde) Yanick Doliveira	000
(Lithuania) Albert Tcheov	000
(Malta) Jeremy Saywell	001
(Venezuela) Ricardo Valderrama	100
(France) Pierre Duprat	001

Quarterfinals
(Mongolia) Khashbaataryn Tsagaanbaatar	101
(Georgia (country)) David Asumbani	000
(Finland) Niko-Tapio Niemela	000
(South Korea) Cho Jun-Ho	001
(Japan) Masashi Ebinuma	100
(Australia) Steven Brown	000
(Malta) Jeremy Saywell	000
(Venezuela) Ricardo Valderrama	100

Semifinals
(Mongolia) Khashbaataryn Tsagaanbaatar	000
(South Korea) Cho Jun-Ho	001
(Japan) Masashi Ebinuma	110
(Venezuela) Ricardo Valderrama	000

Final
(South Korea) Cho Jun-Ho	000
(Japan) Masashi Ebinuma	003

=== Pool B ===
First round fights

	Score	
Musa Mogushkov (Russia)	100–000	(Algeria) Mohamed Merikhi
Carlos Figueroa (El Salvador)	000–102	(Poland) Tomasz Kowalski
Sergiy Pliyev (Ukraine)	001–101	(Uzbekistan) Mirzahid Farmonov
Martin Ivanov (Bulgaria)	100–010	(United Kingdom) Craig Fallon
Tejen Tejenov (Turkmenistan)	000–103	(Romania) László Szőke

Second Round
(Russia) Musa Mogushkov	001
(Italy) Francesco Faraldo	000
(Canada) Michal Popiel	000
(Kazakhstan) Azamat Mukanov	101
(Poland) Tomasz Kowalski	101
(Botswana) Advent Monyatsiwa	000
(Uzbekistan) Mirzahid Farmonov	100
(Mozambique) Neil Mala	000
(Spain) Sugoi Uriarte	001
(Israel) Golan Pollack	011
(Hungary) Miklós Ungvári	010
(Bulgaria) Martin Ivanov	000
(Benin) Jacob Nel Gnahoui	000
(Latvia) Deniss Kozlovs	101
(Azerbaijan) Tarlan Karimov	100
(Romania) László Szőke	000

Quarterfinals
(Russia) Musa Mogushkov	100
(Kazakhstan) Azamat Mukanov	000
(Poland) Tomasz Kowalski	001
(Uzbekistan) Mirzahid Farmonov	002
(Israel) Golan Pollack	000
(Hungary) Miklós Ungvári	100
(Latvia) Deniss Kozlovs	000
(Azerbaijan) Tarlan Karimov	100

Semifinals
(Russia) Musa Mogushkov	001
(Uzbekistan) Mirzahid Farmonov	000
(Hungary) Miklós Ungvári	000
(Azerbaijan) Tarlan Karimov	010

Final
(Russia) Musa Mogushkov	001
(Azerbaijan) Tarlan Karimov	000

=== Pool C ===
First round fights

	Score	
Junpei Morishita (Japan)	101–000	(Canada) Sasha Mehmedovic
Igor Soroca (Moldova)	100–000	(North Korea) Hong Kuk Hyon
Mathews Punza (Zambia)	000–100	(Australia) Ivo dos Santos
Dan Fâșie (Romania)	001–011	(Armenia) Armen Nazaryan
Youcef Nouari (Algeria)	000–101	(South Korea) An Jeong-Hwan

Second Round
(Japan) Junpei Morishita	100
(Lithuania) Vytautas Skilinskas	000
(Moldova) Igor Soroca	100
(Yemen) Waleed Al-Kabzari	000
(United Kingdom) Colin Oates	001
(Poland) Pawel Zagrodnik	000
(Australia) Ivo dos Santos	001
(Ghana) Alex Amoako	101
(Brazil) Leandro Cunha	002
(Armenia) Armen Nazaryan	000
(Georgia (country)) Shalva Kardava	012
(United States) Kenneth Hashimoto	011
(Mozambique) Bruno Luzia	000
(South Korea) An Jeong-Hwan	100
(Ukraine) Serhiy Drebot	110
(Papua New Guinea) Raymond Ovinou	000

Quarterfinals
(Japan) Junpei Morishita	000
(Moldova) Igor Soroca	101
(United Kingdom) Colin Oates	100
(Ghana) Alex Amoako	000
(Brazil) Leandro Cunha	100
(Georgia (country)) Shalva Kardava	000
(South Korea) An Jeong-Hwan	001
(Ukraine) Serhiy Drebot	000

Semifinals
(Moldova) Igor Soroca	000
(United Kingdom) Colin Oates	101
(Brazil) Leandro Cunha	001
(South Korea) An Jeong-Hwan	000

Final
(United Kingdom) Colin Oates	000
(Brazil) Leandro Cunha	100

=== Pool D ===
First round fights

	Score	
Alim Gadanov (Russia)	100–000	(Morocco) Rachid El Kadiri
Humaid Alderei (United Arab Emirates)	001–000	(Kyrgyzstan) Ruslan Dzhanybek Uulu
Ulugbek Norkobilov (Uzbekistan)	100–000	(Ethiopia) Seifu Mekonnen Gebisa
Reginald Altenor (Haiti)	000–100	(Netherlands) Jasper de Jong

Second Round
(Russia) Alim Gadanov	010
(Mongolia) Sanjaasürengiin Miyaaragchaa	000
(Madagascar) Norbert Elie	000
(France) David Larose	100
(United Arab Emirates) Humaid Alderei	000
(Andorra) Daniel Garcia Gonzalez	100
(Kazakhstan) Nauryzbek Mailashev	100
(Thailand) Amornthep Namwiset	000
(Slovenia) Rok Drakšič	101
(Paraguay) Abraham Acevedo	000
(Uzbekistan) Ulugbek Norkobilov	100
(Guam) Gen Imai	000
(Netherlands) Jasper de Jong	002
(Cuba) Anyelo Gomez	000

Quarterfinals
(Russia) Alim Gadanov	000
(France) David Larose	100
(Andorra) Daniel Garcia Gonzalez	000
(Kazakhstan) Nauryzbek Mailashev	100
(Slovenia) Rok Drakšič	011
(Uzbekistan) Ulugbek Norkobilov	000
(Cyprus) Andreas Krassas	001
(Netherlands) Jasper de Jong	110

Semifinals
(France) David Larose	011
(Kazakhstan) Nauryzbek Mailashev	001
(Slovenia) Rok Drakšič	101
(Netherlands) Jasper de Jong	000

Final
(France) David Larose	000
(Slovenia) Rok Drakšič	100

=== Repechage ===
Repechage		Third place
(South Korea) Cho Jun-Ho	010
(Azerbaijan) Tarlan Karimov	000	(South Korea) Cho Jun-Ho	101
		(Slovenia) Rok Drakšič	000

Repechage		Third place
(United Kingdom) Colin Oates	001
(France) David Larose	000	(United Kingdom) Colin Oates	000
		(Russia) Musa Mogushkov	100

=== Finals ===
Semi-finals
(Japan) Masashi Ebinuma	101
(Russia) Musa Mogushkov	000
(Brazil) Leandro Cunha	001
(Slovenia) Rok Drakšič	000

Final
(Japan) Masashi Ebinuma	100
(Brazil) Leandro Cunha	000
