= 2016 European Judo Championships – Men's 66 kg =

Judo Men's 66 kg at the 2016 European Judo Championships
- Venue: TatNeft Arena
- Location: Kazan, Russia
- Date: 21 April
- Competitors: 32 from 22 nations

Medalists
| gold medal | Vazha Margvelashvili (1st title) | Georgia |
| silver medal | Colin Oates | Great Britain |
| bronze medal | Arsen Galstyan | Russia |
| bronze medal | Fabio Basile | Italy |

Competition at external databases
- Links: IJF • JudoInside

The men's 66 kg competition at the 2016 European Judo Championships was held on 21 April at the TatNeft Arena in Kazan, Russia.

== Results ==
=== Finals ===
Semi-finals
Dzmitry Shershan (BLR) | 00
Vazha Margvelashvili (GEO) | 00
Colin Oates (GBR) | 00
Adrian Gomboc (SLO) | 00

Final
Vazha Margvelashvili (GEO) | 10
Colin Oates (GBR) | 00

=== Repechage ===
Repechage
Kenneth Van Gansbeke (BEL) | 00
Arsen Galstyan (RUS) | 10

Third place
Arsen Galstyan (RUS) | 01
Adrian Gomboc (SLO) | 00

Repechage
Fabio Basile (ITA) | 10
Sergiu Oleinic (POR) | 00

Third place
Fabio Basile (ITA) | 00
Dzmitry Shershan (BLR) | 00

=== Pool A ===
First round

Round of 32
Dzmitry Shershan (BLR) | 01
Ilija Ciganović (SRB) | 00
Tarlan Karimov (AZE) | 00
Ferdinand Karapetian (ARM) | 00
Elio Verde (ITA) | 00
Tal Flicker (ISR) | 00
Kenneth Van Gansbeke (BEL) | 10
Matej Poliak (SVK) | 00

Round of 16
Dzmitry Shershan (BLR) | 00
Ferdinand Karapetian (ARM) | 00
Elio Verde (ITA) | 00
Kenneth Van Gansbeke (BEL) | 00

Quarterfinals
Dzmitry Shershan (BLR) | 10
Kenneth Van Gansbeke (BEL) | 00

=== Pool B ===
First round
Gevorg Khachatrian (UKR) | 11
Andraž Jereb (SLO) | 00

Round of 32
Sugoi Uriarte (ESP) | 00
Paweł Zagrodnik (POL) | 00
Arsen Galstyan (RUS) | 11
Gevorg Khachatrian (UKR) | 00
Vazha Margvelashvili (GEO) | 10
André Soares (POR) | 00
Bence Zámbori (HUN) | 00
Sinan Sandal (TUR) | 10

Round of 16
Sugoi Uriarte (ESP) | 00
Arsen Galstyan (RUS) | 01
Vazha Margvelashvili (GEO) | 10
Sinan Sandal (TUR) | 00

Quarterfinals
Arsen Galstyan (RUS) | 00
Vazha Margvelashvili (GEO) | 00

=== Pool C ===
First round

Round of 32
Colin Oates (GBR) | 01
Javier Delgado (ESP) | 00
Jasper Lefevere (BEL) | 10
Charalampos Foulidis (GRE) | 00
Kilian Le Blouch (FRA) | 00
Anzaur Ardanov (RUS) | 10
Akil Gjakova (KOS) | 00
Fabio Basile (ITA) | 00

Round of 16
Colin Oates (GBR) | 01
Jasper Lefevere (BEL) | 00
Anzaur Ardanov (RUS) | 00
Fabio Basile (ITA) | 00

Quarterfinals
Colin Oates (GBR) | 10
Fabio Basile (ITA) | 00

=== Pool D ===
First round

Round of 32
Golan Pollack (ISR) | 00
Dzmitry Minkou (BLR) | 00
Denis Vieru (MDA) | 00
Adrian Gomboc (SLO) | 01
Sergiu Oleinic (POR) | 11
Aleksander Beta (POL) | 00

Round of 16
Dzmitry Minkou (BLR) | 00
Adrian Gomboc (SLO) | 00
Sergiu Oleinic (POR) | 00
Marko Vukićević (SRB) | 00

Quarterfinals
Adrian Gomboc (SLO) | 00
Sergiu Oleinic (POR) | 00
