= Judo at the 2012 Summer Olympics – Men's 66 kg =

Judo competition

Men's 66kg at the Games of the XXX Olympiad
- Venue: ExCeL Exhibition Centre
- Date: 29 July 2012
- Competitors: 36 from 36 nations

Medalists
1st place, gold medalist(s)		Lasha Shavdatuashvili	Georgia
2nd place, silver medalist(s)		Miklós Ungvári	Hungary
3rd place, bronze medalist(s)		Cho Jun-Ho	South Korea
3rd place, bronze medalist(s)		Masashi Ebinuma	Japan

Men's 66 kg competition in judo at the 2012 Summer Olympics in London, United Kingdom, took place at ExCeL London.

The gold and silver medals were determined by a single-elimination tournament, with the winner of the final taking gold and the loser receiving silver. Judo events awarded two bronze medals. Quarterfinal losers competed in a repechage match for the right to face a semifinal loser for a bronze medal (that is, the judokas defeated in quarterfinals A and B competed against each other, with the winner of that match facing the semifinal loser from the other half of the bracket).

== Schedule ==
All times are British Summer Time (UTC+1)

Date	Time	Round
Sunday, 29 July 2012	09:30; 14:00; 16:10	Qualifications; Semifinals; Final

== Results ==
=== Finals ===
Semi-finals
Sugoi Uriarte (ESP)	0000
Miklós Ungvári (HUN)	0011
Lasha Shavdatuashvili (GEO)	1000
Masashi Ebinuma (JPN)	0000

Final
Miklós Ungvári (HUN)	0001
Lasha Shavdatuashvili (GEO)	0010

=== Repechages ===
Repechage		Bronze medal
Tarlan Karimov (AZE)	0000
Pawel Zagrodnik (POL)	0010	Pawel Zagrodnik (POL)	0101
		Masashi Ebinuma (JPN)	1100

Repechage		Bronze medal
Colin Oates (GBR)	0002
Cho Jun-Ho (KOR)	0021	Cho Jun-Ho (KOR)	0000 (GS)
		Sugoi Uriarte (ESP)	0000

=== Pool A ===
First Round
S Uriarte (ESP)	0100
F Faraldo (ITA)	0000

Second Round
M Mogushkov (RUS)	0011
T Karimov (AZE)	0021
A Awad (EGY)	0101
H Al-Derei (UAE)	0001
S Uriarte (ESP)	0100
J Mata (ARU)	0000
D García González (AND)	0020
A Acevedo (PAR)	0001

Third Round
T Karimov (AZE)	0002
A Awad (EGY)	0000
S Uriarte (ESP)	0013
D García González (AND)	0002

Quarterfinals
T Karimov (AZE)	0001
S Uriarte (ESP)	0021

=== Pool B ===
First Round
A Faizzada (AFG)	0000
M Ungvári (HUN)	0100

Second Round
L Cunha (BRA)	0001
P Zagrodnik (POL)	0011
R Ovinou (PNG)	0000
A Nazaryan (ARM)	0100
R Drakšič (SLO)	0100
R Valderrama (VEN)	0001
E Sanchez (BIZ)	0000
M Ungvári (HUN)	0100

Third Round
P Zagrodnik (POL)	0111
A Nazaryan (ARM)	0102
R Drakšič (SLO)	0002
M Ungvári (HUN)	0011

Quarterfinals
P Zagrodnik (POL)	0002
M Ungvári (HUN)	0010

=== Pool C ===
First Round
D Larose (FRA)	0011
G Pollack (ISR)	0000

Second Round
K Tsagaanbaatar (MGL)	0111
K-w Tu (TPE)	0001
I dos Santos (AUS)	0002
C Oates (GBR)	0002
D Larose (FRA)	0100
D Fâșie (ROU)	0000
L Shavdatuashvili (GEO)	0101
A Zuniga (CHI)	0002

Third Round
K Tsagaanbaatar (MGL)	0000
C Oates (GBR)	0011
D Larose (FRA)	0001
L Shavdatuashvili (GEO)	0100

Quarterfinals
C Oates (GBR)	0000
L Shavdatuashvili (GEO)	0100

=== Pool D ===
First Round
C Figueroa (ESA)	0000
S Mehmedovic (CAN)	0010

Second Round
M Ebinuma (JPN)	0111
S Mehmedovic (CAN)	0000
S Lim (KAZ)	0101
M Ivanov (BUL)	0001
J-H Cho (KOR)	0011
S Drebot (UKR)	0002
M Farmonov (UZB)	1011
AY Elkawiseh (LBA)	0002

Third Round
M Ebinuma (JPN)	0010
S Lim (KAZ)	0001
J-H Cho (KOR)	0011
M Farmonov (UZB)	0001

Quarterfinals
M Ebinuma (JPN)	0001
J-H Cho (KOR)	0001
