= 2011 Judo Grand Prix Baku =

Judo competition

Judo 2011 Judo Grand Prix Baku
- Location: Baku, Azerbaijan
- Dates: 6–8 May 2011
- Competitors: 339 from 49 nations

Competition at external databases
- Links: IJF • JudoInside

The 2011 Judo Grand Prix Baku was held in Baku, Azerbaijan from 6 to 8 May 2011.

== Medal summary ==
=== Men's events ===
Event	Gold	Silver	Bronze
Extra-lightweight (−60 kg)	Amiran Papinashvili (GEO)	Boldbaatar Chimed-Yondon (MGL)	Valtteri Jokinen (FIN)
Extra-lightweight (−60 kg)	Amiran Papinashvili (GEO)	Boldbaatar Chimed-Yondon (MGL)	Georgii Zantaraia (UKR)
Half-lightweight (−66 kg)	Rok Drakšič (SLO)	Sugoi Uriarte (ESP)	Francesco Faraldo (ITA)
Half-lightweight (−66 kg)	Rok Drakšič (SLO)	Sugoi Uriarte (ESP)	Mikhail Pulyaev (RUS)
Lightweight (−73 kg)	Navruz Jurakobilov (UZB)	Mirali Sharipov (UZB)	Dex Elmont (NED)
Lightweight (−73 kg)	Navruz Jurakobilov (UZB)	Mirali Sharipov (UZB)	Jaromír Ježek (CZE)
Half-middleweight (−81 kg)	Ole Bischof (GER)	Elkhan Rajabli (AZE)	Leandro Guilheiro (BRA)
Half-middleweight (−81 kg)	Ole Bischof (GER)	Elkhan Rajabli (AZE)	Artem Vasylenko (UKR)
Middleweight (−90 kg)	Dilshod Choriev (UZB)	Kirill Voprosov (RUS)	Karolis Bauža (LTU)
Middleweight (−90 kg)	Dilshod Choriev (UZB)	Kirill Voprosov (RUS)	Elkhan Mammadov (AZE)
Half-heavyweight (−100 kg)	Henk Grol (NED)	Ramziddin Sayidov (UZB)	Daniel Brata (ROU)
Half-heavyweight (−100 kg)	Henk Grol (NED)	Ramziddin Sayidov (UZB)	Ariel Ze'evi (ISR)
Heavyweight (+100 kg)	Islam El Shehaby (EGY)	Ihar Makarau (BLR)	Stanislav Bondarenko (UKR)
Heavyweight (+100 kg)	Islam El Shehaby (EGY)	Ihar Makarau (BLR)	Vladimirs Osnačs (LAT)

=== Women's events ===
Event	Gold	Silver	Bronze
Extra-lightweight (−48 kg)	Lyudmila Bogdanova (RUS)	Mönkhbatyn Urantsetseg (MGL)	Birgit Ente (NED)
Extra-lightweight (−48 kg)	Lyudmila Bogdanova (RUS)	Mönkhbatyn Urantsetseg (MGL)	Elena Moretti (ITA)
Half-lightweight (−52 kg)	Priscilla Gneto (FRA)	He Cancan (CHN)	Laura Gómez (ESP)
Half-lightweight (−52 kg)	Priscilla Gneto (FRA)	He Cancan (CHN)	Aynur Samat (TUR)
Lightweight (−57 kg)	Kifayat Gasimova (AZE)	Wang Hui (CHN)	Sabrina Filzmoser (AUT)
Lightweight (−57 kg)	Kifayat Gasimova (AZE)	Wang Hui (CHN)	Hedvig Karakas (HUN)
Half-middleweight (−63 kg)	Alice Schlesinger (ISR)	Urška Žolnir (SLO)	Anicka van Emden (NED)
Half-middleweight (−63 kg)	Alice Schlesinger (ISR)	Urška Žolnir (SLO)	Esther Stam (NED)
Middleweight (−70 kg)	Edith Bosch (NED)	Anett Mészáros (HUN)	Cecilia Blanco (ESP)
Middleweight (−70 kg)	Edith Bosch (NED)	Anett Mészáros (HUN)	Linda Bolder (NED)
Half-heavyweight (−78 kg)	Abigél Joó (HUN)	Luise Malzahn (GER)	Lucie Louette (FRA)
Half-heavyweight (−78 kg)	Abigél Joó (HUN)	Luise Malzahn (GER)	Marhinde Verkerk (NED)
Heavyweight (+78 kg)	Tea Donguzashvili (RUS)	Yu Song (CHN)	Iryna Kindzerska (UKR)
Heavyweight (+78 kg)	Tea Donguzashvili (RUS)	Yu Song (CHN)	Franziska Konitz (GER)

Source Results

=== Medal table ===
* Host nation (Azerbaijan)

Rank	Nation	Gold	Silver	Bronze	Total
1	Uzbekistan (UZB)	2	2	0	4
2	Russia (RUS)	2	1	1	4
3	Netherlands (NED)	2	0	6	8
4	Azerbaijan (AZE)*	1	1	1	3
4	Germany (GER)	1	1	1	3
4	Hungary (HUN)	1	1	1	3
7	Slovenia (SLO)	1	1	0	2
8	France (FRA)	1	0	1	2
8	Israel (ISR)	1	0	1	2
10	Egypt (EGY)	1	0	0	1
10	Georgia (GEO)	1	0	0	1
12	China (CHN)	0	3	0	3
13	Mongolia (MGL)	0	2	0	2
14	Spain (ESP)	0	1	2	3
15	Belarus (BLR)	0	1	0	1
16	Ukraine (UKR)	0	0	4	4
17	Italy (ITA)	0	0	2	2
18	Austria (AUT)	0	0	1	1
18	Brazil (BRA)	0	0	1	1
18	Czech Republic (CZE)	0	0	1	1
18	Finland (FIN)	0	0	1	1
18	Latvia (LAT)	0	0	1	1
18	Lithuania (LTU)	0	0	1	1
18	Romania (ROU)	0	0	1	1
18	Turkey (TUR)	0	0	1	1
Totals (25 entries)		14	14	28	56
