= Judo at the 2014 Commonwealth Games – Men's 66 kg =

Judo competition

Judo Judo – Men's 66 kg at the 2014 Commonwealth Games
- Venue: Scottish Exhibition and Conference Centre
- Date: 24 July 2014
- Competitors: 26 from 23 nations

Medalists
gold medal	Colin Oates	England
silver medal	Andreas Krassas	Cyprus
bronze medal	Siyabulela Mabulu	South Africa
bronze medal	James Millar	Scotland

The men's 66 kg Judo competitions at the 2014 Commonwealth Games in Glasgow, Scotland was held on 24 July at the Scottish Exhibition and Conference Centre. Judo returned to the program, after last being competed back in 2002.

== Results ==
=== Finals ===
Semifinals		Gold medal
Colin Oates (ENG)	1001
James Millar (SCO)	0002	Colin Oates (ENG)	1010
Andreas Krassas (CYP)	0013	Andreas Krassas (CYP)	0002
Siyabulela Mabulu (RSA)	0003

=== Repechages ===
Repechage		Bronze medal
Manjeet Nandal (IND)	1003
Dieudonne Nama Etoga (CMR)	0002	Manjeet Nandal (IND)	0003
		Siyabulela Mabulu (RSA)	0002

Repechage		Bronze medal
Mathews Punza (ZAM)	100
Bruno Luzia (MOZ)	001	Mathews Punza (ZAM)	0002
		James Millar (SCO)	1001

=== Top half ===
Round of 32
M Fikri (MAS)	1010
A Nzige (TAN)	0000
A Njagi (KEN)	0000
A Weithers (BAR)	1000
J Saywell (MLT)	0011
M Nandal (IND)	1001
B Magagula (SWZ)	0000
D Nama Etoga (CMR)	1000
J Mahit (VAN)	1110
D Rahming Jr (BAH)	0000

Round of 16
C Oates (ENG)	1000
M Fikri (MAS)	0001
A Weithers (BAR)	0000
M Nandal (IND)	1001
A Bouchard (CAN)	0000
D Nama Etoga (CMR)	1002
J Mahit (VAN)	0000
J Millar (SCO)	1000

Quarterfinals
C Oates (ENG)	1001
M Nandal (IND)	0000
D Nama Etoga (CMR)	0002
J Millar (SCO)	0012

Semifinals
C Oates (ENG)	1001
J Millar (SCO)	0002

=== Bottom half ===
Round of 32
A Krassas (CYP)	0001
A Amoako (GHA)	0003
R Theuil (VAN)	000
M Punza (ZAM)	101
J Macdonald (WAL)	w/o
L Smith (SLE)
B Luzia (MOZ)	1100
E Ndawu (MAW)	0000

Round of 16
S Brown (AUS)	0004
A Krassas (CYP)	0102
M Punza (ZAM)	0001
A T Mlugu (TAN)	0003
S Mabulu (RSA)	1000
J Macdonald (WAL)	0001
R Ovinou (PNG)
B Luzia (MOZ)	w/o

Quarterfinals
A Krassas (CYP)	1002
M Punza (ZAM)	0003
S Mabulu (RSA)	1100
B Luzia (MOZ)	0002

Semifinals
A Krassas (CYP)	0013
S Mabulu (RSA)	0003
