= Loïc Korval =

French judoka (born 1988)

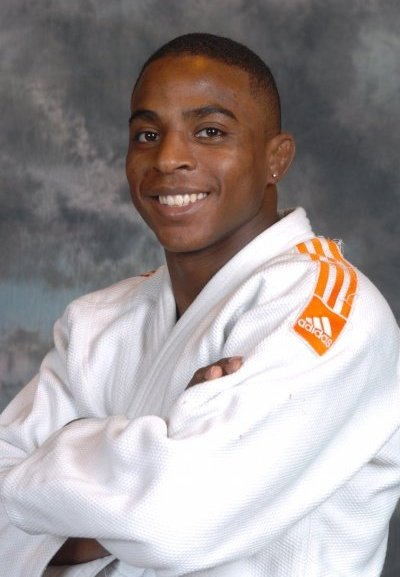

Personal information
- Born: 15 May 1988 (age 38)
- Occupation: Judoka

Sport
- Country: France
- Sport: Judo
- Weight class: ‍–‍66 kg

Achievements and titles
- World Champ.: (bronze) (2010)
- European Champ.: (gold) (2014)
Medal record
Men's judo
Representing France
World Championships
Bronze medal – third place	2010 Tokyo	‍–‍66 kg
European Games
Gold medal – first place	2015 Baku	Men's team
Silver medal – second place	2015 Baku	‍–‍66 kg
European Championships
Gold medal – first place	2014 Montpellier	‍–‍66 kg
Silver medal – second place	2010 Vienna	Men's team
Bronze medal – third place	2014 Montpellier	Men's team
IJF Grand Slam
Bronze medal – third place	2010 Rio de Janeiro	‍–‍66 kg
Bronze medal – third place	2014 Paris	‍–‍66 kg
Bronze medal – third place	2015 Baku	‍–‍66 kg
IJF Grand Prix
Silver medal – second place	2014 Samsun	‍–‍66 kg
Silver medal – second place	2016 Havana	‍–‍66 kg
Bronze medal – third place	2010 Düsseldorf	‍–‍66 kg

Profile at external databases
- IJF: 2371
- JudoInside.com: 28286
- Updated on 19 July 2023

Loïc Korval (born 15 May 1988 in Nogent-sur-Marne, France) is a French judoka who won a bronze medal at the 2010 World Judo Championships ini the ‍–‍66 kg category and a silver medal at the 2010 European Championships in the men's team event. He also won gold in 2014 European Championships in Montpellier at ‍–‍66 kg, defeating his fellow countryman David Larose in the final.
