= 2011 Judo World Masters =

Judo competition

Judo 2011 Judo World Masters
- Venue: Heydar Aliyev Sports and Concert Complex
- Location: Baku, Azerbaijan
- Dates: 15–16 January 2011
- Competitors: 205 from 41 nations

Competition at external databases
- Links: IJF • EJU • JudoInside

The 2011 Judo World Masters World Masters was held in Baku, Azerbaijan, from 15 to 16 January 2011.

== Medal summary ==
=== Medal table ===
* Host nation

Rank	Nation	Gold	Silver	Bronze	Total
1	Japan (JPN)	3	5	6	14
2	France (FRA)	3	1	0	4
3	Azerbaijan (AZE)*	2	0	2	4
4	Russia (RUS)	1	3	2	6
5	South Korea (KOR)	1	1	2	4
6	Mongolia (MGL)	1	0	2	3
7	China (CHN)	1	0	0	1
7	Portugal (POR)	1	0	0	1
7	Uzbekistan (UZB)	1	0	0	1
10	Brazil (BRA)	0	1	1	2
10	Slovenia (SLO)	0	1	1	2
12	Egypt (EGY)	0	1	0	1
12	Greece (GRE)	0	1	0	1
14	Hungary (HUN)	0	0	3	3
14	Spain (ESP)	0	0	3	3
16	Germany (GER)	0	0	2	2
17	Great Britain (GBR)	0	0	1	1
17	Israel (ISR)	0	0	1	1
17	Kazakhstan (KAZ)	0	0	1	1
17	Netherlands (NED)	0	0	1	1
Totals (20 entries)		14	14	28	56

=== Men's events ===
Event	Gold	Silver	Bronze
Extra-lightweight (-60 kg)	Rishod Sobirov; Uzbekistan	Arsen Galstyan; Russia	Ilgar Mushkiyev; Azerbaijan
Extra-lightweight (-60 kg)	Rishod Sobirov; Uzbekistan	Arsen Galstyan; Russia	Beslan Mudranov; Russia
Half-lightweight (-66 kg)	Tsagaanbaatar Khashbaatar; Mongolia	Rok Drakšič; Slovenia	Sugoi Uriarte; Spain
Half-lightweight (-66 kg)	Tsagaanbaatar Khashbaatar; Mongolia	Rok Drakšič; Slovenia	Tarlan Karimov; Azerbaijan
Lightweight (-73 kg)	Wang Ki-chun; South Korea	Mansur Isaev; Russia	Yasuhiro Awano; Japan
Lightweight (-73 kg)	Wang Ki-chun; South Korea	Mansur Isaev; Russia	Attila Ungvári; Hungary
Half-middleweight (-81 kg)	Elnur Mammadli; Azerbaijan	Leandro Guilheiro; Brazil	Euan Burton; Great Britain
Half-middleweight (-81 kg)	Elnur Mammadli; Azerbaijan	Leandro Guilheiro; Brazil	Takahiro Nakai; Japan
Middleweight (-90 kg)	Elkhan Mammadov; Azerbaijan	Ilias Iliadis; Greece	Kirill Denisov; Russia
Middleweight (-90 kg)	Elkhan Mammadov; Azerbaijan	Ilias Iliadis; Greece	Takashi Ono; Japan
Half-heavyweight (-100 kg)	Sergei Samoilovich; Russia	Tagir Khaybulaev; Russia	Maxim Rakov; Kazakhstan
Half-heavyweight (-100 kg)	Sergei Samoilovich; Russia	Tagir Khaybulaev; Russia	Temuulen Battulga; Mongolia
Heavyweight (+100 kg)	Teddy Riner; France	Islam El Shehaby; Egypt	Keiji Suzuki; Japan
Heavyweight (+100 kg)	Teddy Riner; France	Islam El Shehaby; Egypt	Andreas Tölzer; Germany

=== Women's events ===
Event	Gold	Silver	Bronze
Extra-lightweight (-48 kg)	Haruna Asami; Japan	Emi Yamagishi; Japan	Sarah Menezes; Brazil
Extra-lightweight (-48 kg)	Haruna Asami; Japan	Emi Yamagishi; Japan	Éva Csernoviczki; Hungary
Half-lightweight (-52 kg)	Misato Nakamura; Japan	Yuka Nishida; Japan	Bundmaa Munkhbaatar; Mongolia
Half-lightweight (-52 kg)	Misato Nakamura; Japan	Yuka Nishida; Japan	Laura Gómez; Spain
Lightweight (-57 kg)	Telma Monteiro; Portugal	Kaori Matsumoto; Japan	Concepción Bellorín; Spain
Lightweight (-57 kg)	Telma Monteiro; Portugal	Kaori Matsumoto; Japan	Kim Jan-di; South Korea
Half-middleweight (-63 kg)	Gévrise Émane; France	Yoshie Ueno; Japan	Yarden Gerbi; Israel
Half-middleweight (-63 kg)	Gévrise Émane; France	Yoshie Ueno; Japan	Claudia Malzahn; Germany
Middleweight (-70 kg)	Lucie Décosse; France	Hwang Ye-sul; South Korea	Yoriko Kunihara; Japan
Middleweight (-70 kg)	Lucie Décosse; France	Hwang Ye-sul; South Korea	Edith Bosch; Netherlands
Half-heavyweight (-78 kg)	Yang Xiuli; China	Céline Lebrun; France	Akari Ogata; Japan
Half-heavyweight (-78 kg)	Yang Xiuli; China	Céline Lebrun; France	Abigél Joó; Hungary
Heavyweight (+78 kg)	Megumi Tachimoto; Japan	Mika Sugimoto; Japan	Kim Na-young; South Korea
Heavyweight (+78 kg)	Megumi Tachimoto; Japan	Mika Sugimoto; Japan	Lucija Polavder; Slovenia
