= Ahmed Awad =

Ahmed Awad may refer to:

- Ahmed Isse Awad (born 1955), Somali politician
- Ahmed Awad Ibn Auf (born c. 1956), Sudanese politician
- Ahmad Awad bin Mubarak (born 1968), Yemeni politician
- Ahmed Awad (footballer) (born 1992), Palestinian footballer
- Ahmed Awad (judoka) (born 1987), Egyptian judoka
