= 2006 World Judo Juniors Championships =

Judo competition

Judo 2006 World Judo Juniors Championships
- Location: Santo Domingo, Dominican Republic
- Dates: 12–15 October 2006

Competition at external databases
- Links: JudoInside

The 2006 World Judo Juniors Championships was an edition of the World Judo Juniors Championships, organised by the International Judo Federation. It was held in Santo Domingo, Dominican Republic from 12 to 15 October 2006.

== Medal summary ==
=== Men's events ===
| Event | Gold | Silver | Bronze |
|---|---|---|---|
| Extra-lightweight (−60 kg) | Nijat Shikhalizada (AZE) | Masanori Suzuki (JPN) | Rok Drakšič (SLO) |
| Extra-lightweight (−60 kg) | Nijat Shikhalizada (AZE) | Masanori Suzuki (JPN) | Alexandros Gkornteev (GRE) |
| Half-lightweight (−66 kg) | Tariel Zintiridis (GRE) | Sergey Lim (UZB) | Ahmed Abou El Kher (EGY) |
| Half-lightweight (−66 kg) | Tariel Zintiridis (GRE) | Sergey Lim (UZB) | Tomasz Kowalski (POL) |
| Lightweight (−73 kg) | Mickaël Remilien (FRA) | Kazushi Nishioka (JPN) | Sirazhudin Magomedov (RUS) |
| Lightweight (−73 kg) | Mickaël Remilien (FRA) | Kazushi Nishioka (JPN) | Wang Ki-chun (KOR) |
| Half-middleweight (−81 kg) | Alibek Bashkaev (RUS) | Iraj Amirkhani (IRI) | Axel Clerget (FRA) |
| Half-middleweight (−81 kg) | Alibek Bashkaev (RUS) | Iraj Amirkhani (IRI) | Kyohei Kakita (JPN) |
| Middleweight (−90 kg) | Marvin De la Croes (NED) | Hervé Fichot (FRA) | Theodoros Masmanidis (GRE) |
| Middleweight (−90 kg) | Marvin De la Croes (NED) | Hervé Fichot (FRA) | Ali Mohammadnia (IRI) |
| Half-heavyweight (−100 kg) | Cyrille Maret (FRA) | Alius Braciulis (LTU) | Dmitry Renev (RUS) |
| Half-heavyweight (−100 kg) | Cyrille Maret (FRA) | Alius Braciulis (LTU) | Norihide Yamamoto (JPN) |
| Heavyweight (+100 kg) | Teddy Riner (FRA) | Stanislav Bondarenko (UKR) | Tino Bierau (GER) |
| Heavyweight (+100 kg) | Teddy Riner (FRA) | Stanislav Bondarenko (UKR) | Dmitry Sterkhov (RUS) |

=== Women's events ===
| Event | Gold | Silver | Bronze |
|---|---|---|---|
| Extra-lightweight (−48 kg) | Yanet Bermoy (CUB) | Wu Shugen (CHN) | Shoko Ibe (JPN) |
| Extra-lightweight (−48 kg) | Yanet Bermoy (CUB) | Wu Shugen (CHN) | Alexandra Podryadova (KAZ) |
| Half-lightweight (−52 kg) | Moe Kawasaki (JPN) | Maureen Groefsema (NED) | María García (DOM) |
| Half-lightweight (−52 kg) | Moe Kawasaki (JPN) | Maureen Groefsema (NED) | Anush Hakobyan (ARM) |
| Lightweight (−57 kg) | Irina Zabludina (RUS) | Viola Wächter (GER) | Dóra Hegedus (HUN) |
| Lightweight (−57 kg) | Irina Zabludina (RUS) | Viola Wächter (GER) | Olena Sayko (UKR) |
| Half-middleweight (−63 kg) | Onix Cortés (CUB) | Rina Kozawa (JPN) | Amanda Oliveira (BRA) |
| Half-middleweight (−63 kg) | Onix Cortés (CUB) | Rina Kozawa (JPN) | Ronda Rousey (USA) |
| Middleweight (−70 kg) | Tomoe Ueno (JPN) | Anett Mészáros (HUN) | Jennifer Kuijpers (NED) |
| Middleweight (−70 kg) | Tomoe Ueno (JPN) | Anett Mészáros (HUN) | Mayra Aguiar (BRA) |
| Half-heavyweight (−78 kg) | Haruna Kawashima (JPN) | Sally Conway (GBR) | Houda Miled (TUN) |
| Half-heavyweight (−78 kg) | Haruna Kawashima (JPN) | Sally Conway (GBR) | Zhao Jia (CHN) |
| Heavyweight (+78 kg) | Qin Qian (CHN) | Kayra Sayit (FRA) | Kim Na-young (KOR) |
| Heavyweight (+78 kg) | Qin Qian (CHN) | Kayra Sayit (FRA) | Rochele Nunes (BRA) |

Source Results

=== Medal table ===
* Host nation (Dominican Republic)

| Rank | Nation | Gold | Silver | Bronze | Total |
|---|---|---|---|---|---|
| 1 | Japan (JPN) | 3 | 3 | 3 | 9 |
| 2 | France (FRA) | 3 | 2 | 1 | 6 |
| 3 | Russia (RUS) | 2 | 0 | 3 | 5 |
| 4 | Cuba (CUB) | 2 | 0 | 0 | 2 |
| 5 | China (CHN) | 1 | 1 | 1 | 3 |
| 5 | Netherlands (NED) | 1 | 1 | 1 | 3 |
| 7 | Greece (GRE) | 1 | 0 | 2 | 3 |
| 8 | Azerbaijan (AZE) | 1 | 0 | 0 | 1 |
| 9 | Germany (GER) | 0 | 1 | 1 | 2 |
| 9 | Hungary (HUN) | 0 | 1 | 1 | 2 |
| 9 | Iran (IRI) | 0 | 1 | 1 | 2 |
| 9 | Ukraine (UKR) | 0 | 1 | 1 | 2 |
| 13 | Great Britain (GBR) | 0 | 1 | 0 | 1 |
| 13 | Lithuania (LTU) | 0 | 1 | 0 | 1 |
| 13 | Uzbekistan (UZB) | 0 | 1 | 0 | 1 |
| 16 | Brazil (BRA) | 0 | 0 | 3 | 3 |
| 17 | South Korea (KOR) | 0 | 0 | 2 | 2 |
| 18 | Armenia (ARM) | 0 | 0 | 1 | 1 |
| 18 | Dominican Republic (DOM)* | 0 | 0 | 1 | 1 |
| 18 | Egypt (EGY) | 0 | 0 | 1 | 1 |
| 18 | Kazakhstan (KAZ) | 0 | 0 | 1 | 1 |
| 18 | Poland (POL) | 0 | 0 | 1 | 1 |
| 18 | Slovenia (SLO) | 0 | 0 | 1 | 1 |
| 18 | Tunisia (TUN) | 0 | 0 | 1 | 1 |
| 18 | United States (USA) | 0 | 0 | 1 | 1 |
| Totals (25 entries) | | 14 | 14 | 28 | 56 |
