= Judo at the 2011 Pacific Games =

Judo competition

- Location: Nouméa, New Caledonia
- Dates: 6–8 September 2011

Judo at the 2011 Pacific Games was held on 6–8 September at Nouméa in New Caledonia.

== Medal summary ==
=== Medal table ===
Rank	Nation	Gold	Silver	Bronze	Total
1	New Caledonia	12	8	10	30
2	Fiji	5	2	0	7
3	French Polynesia (TAH)	1	7	9	17
4	Papua New Guinea	0	0	4	4
4	Samoa	0	0	4	4
6	Vanuatu	0	0	2	2
7	Nauru	0	0	1	1
7	Solomon Islands	0	0	1	1
Totals (8 entries)		18	17	31	66

=== Men ===
Event	Gold	Silver	Bronze
-60kg	Cyril Chevalier; New Caledonia	Laurent Sachet; Tahiti	Corentin Le Goff; Tahiti
-60kg	Cyril Chevalier; New Caledonia	Laurent Sachet; Tahiti	Cédric Do; New Caledonia
–66kg	Paul Dulac; New Caledonia	Cédric Delanne; Tahiti	Fred Kabolo; Solomon Islands
–66kg	Paul Dulac; New Caledonia	Cédric Delanne; Tahiti	Raymond Ovinou; Papua New Guinea
–73kg	Abedias Triniidade de Abreu; New Caledonia	Aiurahi Raihauti; Tahiti	Abner H. Waterhouse; Samoa
–73kg	Abedias Triniidade de Abreu; New Caledonia	Aiurahi Raihauti; Tahiti	Jérôme Michaud; New Caledonia
–81kg	Josateki Naulu; Fiji	Yohann Courtine; New Caledonia	Romain Desfour; New Caledonia
–81kg	Josateki Naulu; Fiji	Yohann Courtine; New Caledonia	Frank Stowers; Samoa
–90kg	Teva Gouriou; New Caledonia	Anthony Tran; New Caledonia	Mickael Martin; Tahiti
–90kg	Teva Gouriou; New Caledonia	Anthony Tran; New Caledonia	David Chevalier; Tahiti
–100kg	Jerome Papai; New Caledonia	Jean-Francois Durand; New Caledonia	
–100kg	Jerome Papai; New Caledonia	Jean-Francois Durand; New Caledonia	Not awarded
+100kg	Jérémy Picard; Tahiti	Philippe Vautrin; New Caledonia	Stephane Coutrine; New Caledonia
+100kg	Jérémy Picard; Tahiti	Philippe Vautrin; New Caledonia	Joseph Iga; Nauru
Open	Teva Gouriou; New Caledonia	Jérôme Papai; Tahiti	Jérémy Picard; Tahiti
Open	Teva Gouriou; New Caledonia	Jérôme Papai; Tahiti	David Chevalier; Tahiti
Team	New Caledonia	(French Polynesia) Tahiti	Samoa
Team	New Caledonia	(French Polynesia) Tahiti	Papua New Guinea

=== Women ===
Event	Gold	Silver	Bronze
–48kg	Elodie Foillet; New Caledonia	Severine Raze; New Caledonia	Vaiana Girard; Tahiti
–48kg	Elodie Foillet; New Caledonia	Severine Raze; New Caledonia	Veronica Tari; Vanuatu
–52kg	Cyndi Rival; New Caledonia	Hinatea Camaille; Tahiti	Raissa Miko; New Caledonia
–52kg	Cyndi Rival; New Caledonia	Hinatea Camaille; Tahiti	Reia Tauotaha; Tahiti
–57kg	Rosa Delots; New Caledonia	Elina Nasaudrodro; Fiji	Emeline Kaddour; New Caledonia
–57kg	Rosa Delots; New Caledonia	Elina Nasaudrodro; Fiji	Laetitia Wuilmet; New Caledonia
–63kg	Vani Kelekelivalu; Fiji	Vaéa Chadfaeu; New Caledonia	Vaihei Vahirua; Tahiti
–63kg	Vani Kelekelivalu; Fiji	Vaéa Chadfaeu; New Caledonia	Naumi Tehei; Tahiti
–70kg	Anais Gopéa; New Caledonia	Vaianaa Firuu; Tahiti	
–70kg	Anais Gopéa; New Caledonia	Vaianaa Firuu; Tahiti	Jade Teai; New Caledonia
–78kg	Sisila Rasokisoki; Fiji	Erika Song; New Caledonia	Kasey Keneke; Papua New Guinea
–78kg	Sisila Rasokisoki; Fiji	Erika Song; New Caledonia	Marie Keneke; Papua New Guinea
+78kg	Mereseini Galu; Fiji	Elena Korowaqa Navuasese; Fiji	Amata Sialéhifoga Fiakafonu; Vanuatu
+78kg	Mereseini Galu; Fiji	Elena Korowaqa Navuasese; Fiji	Ladesha Stevenson; Samoa
Open	Sisila Rasokisoki; Fiji	Meresini Galu; Fiji	Anais Gopéa; New Caledonia
Open	Sisila Rasokisoki; Fiji	Meresini Galu; Fiji	Vaéa Chadfeau; New Caledonia
Team	New Caledonia	Not awarded	Not awarded
