= 2006 European Junior Judo Championships =

Judo competition

Judo 2006 European Junior Judo Championships
- Location: Tallinn, Estonia
- Dates: 8–10 September 2006

Competition at external databases
- Links: JudoInside

The 2006 European Junior Judo Championships is an edition of the European Junior Judo Championships, organised by the International Judo Federation. It was held in Tallinn, Estonia from 8 to 10 September 2006.

== Medal summary ==
=== Medal table ===
* Host nation (Estonia)

Rank	Nation	Gold	Silver	Bronze	Total
1	France (FRA)	4	2	3	9
2	Netherlands (NED)	3	0	2	5
3	Ukraine (UKR)	2	2	0	4
4	Russia (RUS)	1	2	2	5
5	Germany (GER)	1	1	2	4
5	Hungary (HUN)	1	1	2	4
7	Israel (ISR)	1	1	0	2
8	Romania (ROU)	1	0	2	3
9	Georgia (GEO)	1	0	1	2
10	Italy (ITA)	0	2	0	2
11	Belarus (BLR)	0	1	2	3
12	Armenia (ARM)	0	1	1	2
12	Azerbaijan (AZE)	0	1	1	2
14	Poland (POL)	0	0	2	2
14	Slovenia (SLO)	0	0	2	2
16	Bulgaria (BUL)	0	0	1	1
16	Estonia (EST)*	0	0	1	1
16	Greece (GRE)	0	0	1	1
16	Portugal (POR)	0	0	1	1
16	Slovakia (SVK)	0	0	1	1
16	Spain (ESP)	0	0	1	1
Totals (21 entries)		15	14	28	57

=== Men's events ===
Event	Gold	Silver	Bronze
−60 kg	Georgii Zantaraia (UKR)	Achraf Fikri (FRA)	Bekir Özlü (GEO)
−60 kg	Georgii Zantaraia (UKR)	Achraf Fikri (FRA)	Pavlak Vardazaryan (ARM)
−66 kg	Dan Fâșie (ROU)	Alexei Staushy (BLR)	Ugo Legrand (FRA)
−66 kg	Dan Fâșie (ROU)	Alexei Staushy (BLR)	Paweł Zagrodnik (POL)
−73 kg	Mickaël Remilien (FRA)	Aleksander Kozlov (RUS)	Georgi Ladogin (EST)
−73 kg	Mickaël Remilien (FRA)	Aleksander Kozlov (RUS)	Seymur Rzazade (AZE)
−81 kg	Sven Maresch (GER)	Sirazhudin Magomedov (RUS)	Milan Randl (SVK)
−81 kg	Sven Maresch (GER)	Sirazhudin Magomedov (RUS)	Aljaž Sedej (SLO)
−90 kg	Hervé Fichot (FRA)	Vadym Synyavsky (UKR)	Theodoros Masmanidis (GRE)
−90 kg	Hervé Fichot (FRA)	Vadym Synyavsky (UKR)	Robert Zimmermann (GER)
−100 kg	Nodar Metreveli (GEO)	Adám Juhász (HUN)	Genko Ivanov (BUL)
−100 kg	Nodar Metreveli (GEO)	Adám Juhász (HUN)	Aslan Khubiev (RUS)
+100 kg	Teddy Riner (FRA)	Tino Bierau (GER)	Aliaksandr Vakhaviak (BLR)
+100 kg	Teddy Riner (FRA)	Tino Bierau (GER)	Jeffrey van Emden (NED)

=== Women's events ===
Event	Gold	Silver	Bronze
−48 kg	Olha Sukha (UKR)	Valentina Moscatt (ITA)	Leandra Freitas (POR)
−48 kg	Olha Sukha (UKR)	Valentina Moscatt (ITA)	Monica Ungureanu (ROU)
−52 kg	Kitty Bravik (NED)	Anush Hakobyan (ARM)	Andreea Chițu (ROU)
−52 kg	Kitty Bravik (NED)	Anush Hakobyan (ARM)	Darya Skrypnik (BLR)
−57 kg	Michelle Diemeer (NED)	Shahana Almammadova (AZE)	Dóra Hegedus (HUN)
−57 kg	Michelle Diemeer (NED)	Shahana Almammadova (AZE)	Automne Pavia (FRA)
−63 kg	Marta Labazina (RUS)	Alice Schlesinger (ISR)	Valériane Fichot (FRA)
−63 kg	Marta Labazina (RUS)	Alice Schlesinger (ISR)	Ninetta Kakonyi (HUN)
−70 kg	Anett Mészáros (HUN)	Jessy Florentin (FRA)	María Bernabéu (ESP)
−70 kg	Anett Mészáros (HUN)	Jessy Florentin (FRA)	Linda Bolder (NED)
−78 kg	Judith Jaeqx (NED)	Viktoriya Denysenko (UKR)	Lea Murko (SLO)
−78 kg	Judith Jaeqx (NED)	Viktoriya Denysenko (UKR)	Daria Pogorzelec (POL)
+78 kg	Kayra Sayit (FRA)	Lucia Tangorre (ITA)	Polina Belousova (RUS)
+78 kg	Kayra Sayit (FRA)	Lucia Tangorre (ITA)	Beatrice Rietz (GER)

Source Results
