= Ahmed Yousef Elkawiseh =

Libyan judoka (born 1989)

Personal information
- Born: 24 March 1989 (age 36)
- Occupation: Judoka

Sport
- Sport: Judo

Profile at external databases
- IJF: 4504
- JudoInside.com: 81524

Ahmed Yousef Elkawiseh (Arabic: احمد يوسف الكويسح, also transliterated Ahmed Youssif El-Kawiseh, born 24 March 1989 in Tripoli) is a Libyan judoka. At the 2012 Summer Olympics he competed in the men's 66 kg, but after a bye in the first round was defeated in the second round by Mirzahid Farmonov.
