= Colin Oates =

British judoka

Personal information
- Nationality: British (English)
- Born: 7 June 1983 (age 43)
- Occupation: Judoka

Sport
- Country: Great Britain
- Sport: Judo
- Weight class: ‍–‍66 kg

Achievements and titles
- Olympic Games: 7th (2012)
- World Champ.: 5th (2011)
- European Champ.: (silver) (2016)
- Commonwealth Games: (gold) (2014)
Medal record
Men's judo
Representing Great Britain
European Championships
Silver medal – second place	2016 Kazan	‍–‍66 kg
Bronze medal – third place	2011 Istanbul	‍–‍66 kg
IJF Grand Slam
Gold medal – first place	2014 Baku	‍–‍66 kg
Silver medal – second place	2013 Moscow	‍–‍66 kg
Silver medal – second place	2015 Baku	‍–‍66 kg
IJF Grand Prix
Bronze medal – third place	2013 Rijeka	‍–‍66 kg
Bronze medal – third place	2014 Samsun	‍–‍66 kg
Bronze medal – third place	2014 Jeju	‍–‍66 kg
Representing England
Commonwealth Games
Gold medal – first place	2014 Glasgow	‍–‍66 kg

Profile at external databases
- IJF: 100
- JudoInside.com: 18024
- Updated on 11 November 2022

Colin Oates (born 7 June 1983 in Harold Wood, London) is an English former Judoka.

== Judo career ==
In 2011, Oates won a bronze medal at the 2011 European Championship, defeating Pierre Duprat from France, and finished fifth in the 2011 World Championship, losing to Musa Mogushkov from Russia in the bronze medal match. This secured his qualification to his first Olympic Games in London.

Oates competed for Team GB in the 2012 London Olympics in the men's 66 kg judo event. After victories over Australia's Ivo dos Santos and former World Champion Khashbaataryn Tsagaanbaatar, Oates was beaten in the quarter-finals by the eventual gold medallist, Lasha Shavdatuashvili from Georgia, being pinned for 15 seconds during "golden score" overtime. He lost again in the repêchage to Cho Jun-Ho of South Korea, who went on to win the bronze medal.

Colin became Commonwealth Champion in Glasgow (2014) at under 66 kg, defeating Andreas Krassas in the final. Two years later, in 2016, he won a silver medal at the European Championships in Russia. After London, Colin added to his Grand Slam and Grand Prix medals including a Gold in the Baku Grand Slam in 2014, followed by a silver the following year.

Between 2012 and 2016, he was ranked in the top 15 in the world, spending most of that period in the top ten, and qualified for his second Olympics in Rio 2016, where he was eliminated in the round of 32. His final major tournament successes came in 2016 and 2017. Competing two weight groups higher than his usual fighting weight, at under 81 kilograms, Colin took gold in both the 2016 British Judo Championships and the English Senior Open. The 2016 victory was the fifth time that he was crowned champion of Great Britain, having previously won the British Judo Championships in 2007, 2012, 2013 and 2014.

== Author ==
Colin has co-authored two judo books with his father Howard Oates.

- Colin Oates Judo, Getting Started ISBN 978-1910773086.
- Colin Oates Judo: Groundwork ISBN 978-1910773369.

In 2021, Pitch Publishing released a biography (written by father, Howard) about Colin and his rise to glory entitled 'Accidental Olympian: Colin Oates, a Judo journey'. ISBN 978-1785318917

== Personal life ==
Colin has a brother, David Oates, who is a writer and illustrator of children's books.
