= 2013 Judo Grand Prix Tashkent =

Judo competition

Judo 2013 Judo Grand Prix Tashkent
- Location: Tashkent, Uzbekistan
- Dates: 4–6 October 2013
- Competitors: 163 from 21 nations

Competition at external databases
- Links: IJF • JudoInside

The 2013 Judo Grand Prix Tashkent was held in Tashkent, Uzbekistan from 4 to 6 October 2013.

== Medal summary ==
=== Men's events ===
Event	Gold	Silver	Bronze
Extra-lightweight (−60 kg)	Sharafuddin Lutfillaev (UZB)	Hevorh Hevorhyan (UKR)	Ganboldyn Kherlen (MGL)
Extra-lightweight (−60 kg)	Sharafuddin Lutfillaev (UZB)	Hevorh Hevorhyan (UKR)	Diego Dos Santos (BRA)
Half-lightweight (−66 kg)	Mirzohid Farmonov (UZB)	Batgerel Battsetseg (MGL)	Leandro Cunha (BRA)
Half-lightweight (−66 kg)	Mirzohid Farmonov (UZB)	Batgerel Battsetseg (MGL)	Andraž Jereb (SLO)
Lightweight (−73 kg)	Mirali Sharipov (UZB)	Alex Pombo (BRA)	Khashbaataryn Tsagaanbaatar (MGL)
Lightweight (−73 kg)	Mirali Sharipov (UZB)	Alex Pombo (BRA)	Victor Scvortov (UAE)
Half-middleweight (−81 kg)	Travis Stevens (USA)	Amir Ghaseminejad (IRI)	Hannes Conrad (GER)
Half-middleweight (−81 kg)	Travis Stevens (USA)	Amir Ghaseminejad (IRI)	Yakhyo Imamov (UZB)
Middleweight (−90 kg)	Sherali Juraev (UZB)	Erkin Doniyorov (UZB)	Dilshod Choriev (UZB)
Middleweight (−90 kg)	Sherali Juraev (UZB)	Erkin Doniyorov (UZB)	Komronshokh Ustopiriyon (TJK)
Half-heavyweight (−100 kg)	Soyib Kurbonov (UZB)	Ramziddin Sayidov (UZB)	Karl-Richard Frey (GER)
Half-heavyweight (−100 kg)	Soyib Kurbonov (UZB)	Ramziddin Sayidov (UZB)	Dmytro Luchyn (UKR)
Heavyweight (+100 kg)	André Breitbarth (GER)	Boltoboy Baltaev (UZB)	Mukhamadmurod Abdurakhmonov (TJK)
Heavyweight (+100 kg)	André Breitbarth (GER)	Boltoboy Baltaev (UZB)	David Moura (BRA)

=== Women's events ===
Event	Gold	Silver	Bronze
Extra-lightweight (−48 kg)	Shira Rishony (ISR)	Alexandra Podryadova (KAZ)	Nodira Gulova (UZB)
Half-lightweight (−52 kg)	Ilse Heylen (BEL)	Gili Cohen (ISR)	Roni Schwartz (ISR)
Half-lightweight (−52 kg)	Ilse Heylen (BEL)	Gili Cohen (ISR)	Kalpana Devi Thoudam (IND)
Lightweight (−57 kg)	Ketleyn Quadros (BRA)	Hana Carmichael (USA)	Andrea Bekic (CRO)
Lightweight (−57 kg)	Ketleyn Quadros (BRA)	Hana Carmichael (USA)	Nazgul Kubasheva (KAZ)
Half-middleweight (−63 kg)	Mariana Barros (BRA)	Hannah Martin (USA)	Hilde Drexler (AUT)
Half-middleweight (−63 kg)	Mariana Barros (BRA)	Hannah Martin (USA)	Marian Urdabayeva (KAZ)
Middleweight (−70 kg)	Bárbara Timo (BRA)	Nadia Merli (BRA)	Gulnoza Matniyazova (UZB)
Middleweight (−70 kg)	Bárbara Timo (BRA)	Nadia Merli (BRA)	Lior Wildikan (ISR)
Half-heavyweight (−78 kg)	Ivana Maranić (CRO)	Samantha Bleier (USA)	Albina Amangeldiyeva (KAZ)
Half-heavyweight (−78 kg)	Ivana Maranić (CRO)	Samantha Bleier (USA)	Sunibala Huidrom (IND)
Heavyweight (+78 kg)	Gulzhan Issanova (KAZ)	Odkhüügiin Javzmaa (MGL)	Saneayim Erkinbaeva (UZB)

Source Results

=== Medal table ===
* Host nation (Uzbekistan)

Rank	Nation	Gold	Silver	Bronze	Total
1	Uzbekistan (UZB)*	5	3	7	15
2	Brazil (BRA)	3	2	3	8
3	United States (USA)	1	3	0	4
4	Kazakhstan (KAZ)	1	1	3	5
5	Israel (ISR)	1	1	2	4
6	Germany (GER)	1	0	2	3
7	Croatia (CRO)	1	0	1	2
8	Belgium (BEL)	1	0	0	1
9	Mongolia (MGL)	0	2	2	4
10	Ukraine (UKR)	0	1	1	2
11	Iran (IRI)	0	1	0	1
12	India (IND)	0	0	2	2
12	Tajikistan (TJK)	0	0	2	2
14	Austria (AUT)	0	0	1	1
14	Slovenia (SLO)	0	0	1	1
14	United Arab Emirates (UAE)	0	0	1	1
Totals (16 entries)		14	14	28	56
