= Ajmal Faizzada =

Afghan judoka

Personal information
- Full name: Ajmal Faizzada
- Born: May 20, 1987 (age 39) Kabul, Afghanistan
- Occupation: Judoka
- Height: 1.73 m (5 ft 8 in)
- Weight: 66 kg (146 lb)

Sport
- Country: Afghanistan
- Sport: Judo
- Event: 66 kg

Achievements and titles
- Olympic Games: London 2012 (1R)
Medal record
Men's judo
Representing Afghanistan
South Asian Games
| Silver medal – second place | 2016 Guwahati | 81 kg |

Profile at external databases
- JudoInside.com: 76581

Ajmal Faizzada (born 20 May 1987) is an Afghan judoka. (Note: "Ajmal Faizzada". London 2012. The London Organising Committee of the Olympic Games and Paralympic Games Limited.) At London 2012 he competed in the Men's 66 kg, but was defeated in the first round by Hungary's Miklos Ungvari, who was the eventual finalist, winning the silver medal.
