= Eddermys Sanchez =

Belizean judoka (born 1980)

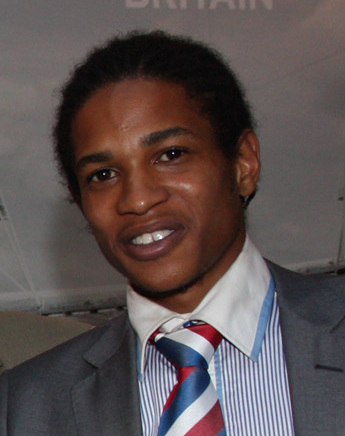
- Sanchez in 2012

Personal information
- Born: 25 March 1980 (age 45)
- Occupation: Judoka

Sport
- Sport: Judo

Profile at external databases
- JudoInside.com: 86681

Eddermys Sanchez (born in Sancti Spíritus, Cuba) is a Belizean judoka. At the 2012 Summer Olympics he competed in the Men's 66 kg, but was defeated in the second round.
