= Ahmed Awad (judoka) =

Egyptian judoka

Personal information
- Full name: Ahmed Awad Ahmed Abu Al-Khair
- Nationality: Egyptian
- Born: 1 January 1987 (age 39) Sharkia, Egypt
- Occupation: Judoka
- Height: 165 cm (5 ft 5 in)

Sport
- Country: Egypt
- Sport: Judo
- Weight class: –66 kg

Achievements and titles
- Olympic Games: R16 (2012)
- World Champ.: R64 (2005, 2007, 2009)
- African Champ.: (gold) (2011)
Medal record
Men's judo
Representing Egypt
African Games
Gold medal – first place	2011 Maputo	–66 kg
African Championships
Gold medal – first place	2011 Dakar	–66 kg
Bronze medal – third place	2012 Agadir	–66 kg
Bronze medal – third place	2013 Maputo	–66 kg
IJF Grand Prix
Bronze medal – third place	2009 Tunis	–66 kg
African Junior Championships
Gold medal – first place	2006 South Africa	–66 kg
Mediterranean Games
Silver medal – second place	2009 Pescara	–66 kg

Profile at external databases
- IJF: 893
- JudoInside.com: 39872
- Updated on 3 January 2023

Ahmed Awad Ahmed Abu Al-Khair (born 1 January 1987), known as Ahmed Awad, is an Egyptian judoka. He was born in Sharkia, Egypt. Awad competed in the men's 66 kg judo at the 2012 Summer Olympics in London. He lost in the round of 16 to Tarlan Karimov from Azerbaijan.
