= Francesco Faraldo =

Italian judoka (born 1982)

Personal information
- Born: 14 February 1982 (age 44) Aversa, Italy
- Occupation: Judoka

Sport
- Country: Italy
- Sport: Judo
- Weight class: ‍–‍66 kg

Achievements and titles
- Olympic Games: R64 (2012)
- World Champ.: R32 (2009)
- European Champ.: 5th (2009)
Medal record
Men's judo
Representing Italy
IJF Grand Prix
Silver medal – second place	2010 Rotterdam	‍–‍66 kg
Bronze medal – third place	2011 Baku	‍–‍66 kg
Mediterranean Games
Bronze medal – third place	2009 Pescara	‍–‍66 kg

Profile at external databases
- IJF: 658
- JudoInside.com: 15959
- Updated on 2 January 2023

Francesco Faraldo (born 14 February 1982) is an Italian judoka. At the 2012 Summer Olympics he competed in the men's 66 kg, being defeated in the first round.
