= Leandro Cunha =

Brazilian judoka (born 1980)

Personal information
- Full name: Leandro Leme da Cunha
- Born: 13 October 1980 (age 45) São José dos Campos, São Paulo
- Occupation: Judoka
- Height: 170 cm (5 ft 7 in)

Sport
- Country: Brazil
- Sport: Judo
- Weight class: ‍–‍66 kg

Achievements and titles
- Olympic Games: R32 (2012)
- World Champ.: (silver) (2010, 2011)
- Pan American Champ.: (2004, 2011, 2012)
Medal record
Men's judo
Representing Brazil
World Championships
Silver medal – second place	2010 Tokyo	‍–‍66 kg
Silver medal – second place	2011 Paris	‍–‍66 kg
Pan American Games
Gold medal – first place	2011 Guadalajara	‍–‍66 kg
Pan American Championships
Gold medal – first place	2004 Isla Margarita	‍–‍66 kg
Gold medal – first place	2011 Guadalajara	‍–‍66 kg
Gold medal – first place	2012 Montreal	‍–‍66 kg
Silver medal – second place	2006 Buenos Aires	‍–‍66 kg
Silver medal – second place	2007 Montreal	‍–‍66 kg
Bronze medal – third place	2010 San Salvador	‍–‍66 kg
IJF Grand Prix
Bronze medal – third place	2010 Qingdao	‍–‍66 kg
Bronze medal – third place	2013 Tashkent	‍–‍66 kg
Military World Games
Gold medal – first place	2015 Mungyeong	Team

Profile at external databases
- IJF: 430
- JudoInside.com: 11843
- Updated on 17 July 2023

Leandro Leme da Cunha (born 13 October 1980) is a male judoka from Brazil. He won the gold medal in the Half-lightweight division (‍–‍66 kg) at the 2011 Pan American Games in Guadalajara, Mexico and the silver medal in the World Judo Championships twice (2010 and 2011).

He also competed for Brazil at the 2012 Summer Olympics in the men's 66 kg event.
