= Serhiy Drebot =

Ukrainian judoka (born 1987)

Personal information
- Born: 16 May 1987 (age 39)
- Occupation: Judoka

Sport
- Country: Ukraine
- Sport: Judo
- Weight class: –66 kg, –73 kg

Achievements and titles
- Olympic Games: R32 (2012)
- World Champ.: R16 (2009, 2013)
- European Champ.: R16 (2008, 2011, 2012, 2013, 2014, 2015)
Medal record
Men's judo
Representing Ukraine
European Games
Bronze medal – third place	2015 Baku	Men's team
IJF Grand Prix
Gold medal – first place	2013 Jeju	–73 kg
Silver medal – second place	2009 Tunis	–66 kg
Bronze medal – third place	2010 Rotterdam	–66 kg
Bronze medal – third place	2010 Abu Dhabi	–66 kg
Bronze medal – third place	2011 Düsseldorf	–66 kg
Bronze medal – third place	2011 Qingdao	–66 kg
European Cadet Championships
Bronze medal – third place	2003 Baku	–55 kg

Profile at external databases
- IJF: 650
- JudoInside.com: 32340
- Updated on 26 December 2022

Serhiy Drebot (born 16 May 1987 in Ivano-Frankivsk) is a Ukrainian judoka. At the 2012 Summer Olympics he competed in the Men's 66 kg, but was defeated in the second round by Cho Jun-Ho.
