= Dilshod Choriev =

Uzbekistani judoka (born 1985)

Personal information
- Nationality: Uzbekistani
- Born: 3 July 1985 (age 40)
- Occupation: Judoka

Sport
- Country: Uzbekistan
- Sport: Judo
- Weight class: ‍–‍90 kg

Achievements and titles
- Olympic Games: 7th (2012)
- World Champ.: (bronze) (2009)
- Asian Champ.: (gold) (2012)
Medal record
Men's judo
Representing Uzbekistan
World Championships
Bronze medal – third place	2009 Rotterdam	‍–‍90 kg
Asian Games
Silver medal – second place	2010 Guangzhou	‍–‍90 kg
Silver medal – second place	2014 Incheon	‍–‍90 kg
Bronze medal – third place	2014 Incheon	Men's team
Asian Championships
Gold medal – first place	2012 Tashkent	‍–‍90 kg
Silver medal – second place	2009 Taipei	‍–‍90 kg
Bronze medal – third place	2011 Abu Dhabi	‍–‍90 kg
World Masters
Bronze medal – third place	2010 Suwon	‍–‍90 kg
IJF Grand Slam
Gold medal – first place	2012 Paris	‍–‍90 kg
Silver medal – second place	2010 Paris	‍–‍90 kg
Silver medal – second place	2014 Tyumen	‍–‍90 kg
Bronze medal – third place	2009 Tokyo	‍–‍90 kg
Bronze medal – third place	2010 Moscow	‍–‍90 kg
Bronze medal – third place	2010 Tokyo	‍–‍90 kg
Bronze medal – third place	2013 Paris	‍–‍90 kg
IJF Grand Prix
Gold medal – first place	2009 Abu Dhabi	‍–‍90 kg
Gold medal – first place	2011 Baku	‍–‍90 kg
Silver medal – second place	2017 Tashkent	‍–‍90 kg
Bronze medal – third place	2010 Düsseldorf	‍–‍90 kg
Bronze medal – third place	2012 Abu Dhabi	‍–‍90 kg
Bronze medal – third place	2013 Tashkent	‍–‍90 kg
Bronze medal – third place	2016 Samsun	‍–‍90 kg
Bronze medal – third place	2017 Tashkent	‍–‍90 kg
Asian Junior Championships
Gold medal – first place	2004 Doha	‍–‍73 kg

Profile at external databases
- IJF: 708
- JudoInside.com: 43531
- Updated on 13 August 2023

Dilshod Choriev (born 3 July 1985 in Qashqadaryo, Uzbekistan) is an Uzbek judoka. Choriev competed at the 2012 Summer Olympics in the ‍–‍90 kg event. Choriev won a bronze medal at the 2009 World Judo Championships. At the Asian Championships, Choriev also won a gold (2012), two silvers (2009 and 2010) and a bronze medal (2011).
