= Tu Kai-wen =

Taiwanese judoka

Tu Kai-wen (Chinese: 杜凱文; pinyin: Dù Kǎiwén) is a Taiwanese judoka. At the 2012 Summer Olympics he competed in the Men's 66 kg, but was defeated in the second round.
