= Takahiro Nakai =

Japanese judoka

Personal information
- Born: 15 October 1990 (age 35)
- Occupation: Judoka

Sport
- Country: Japan
- Sport: Judo
- Weight class: ‍–‍81 kg

Achievements and titles
- Olympic Games: 5th (2012)
- World Champ.: R16 (2011)
- Asian Champ.: 5th (2011)
Medal record
Men's judo
Representing Japan
World Masters
Silver medal – second place	2012 Almaty	‍–‍81 kg
Bronze medal – third place	2011 Baku	‍–‍81 kg
IJF Grand Slam
Gold medal – first place	2010 Tokyo	‍–‍81 kg
Bronze medal – third place	2013 Tokyo	‍–‍81 kg
IJF Grand Prix
Gold medal – first place	2011 Abu Dhabi	‍–‍81 kg
Silver medal – second place	2010 Rotterdam	‍–‍81 kg

Profile at external databases
- IJF: 2001
- JudoInside.com: 57781
- Updated on 20 November 2022

Takahiro Nakai (中井 貴裕, Nakai Takahiro; born 15 October 1990 in Ōbu) is a Japanese judoka. He competed in the men's 81 kg event at the 2012 Summer Olympics. He defeated Boas Munyonga in the second round and Sergiu Toma in the third round before losing to Ole Bischof in the fourth round; after defeating Leandro Guilheiro in the repechages, he lost to Ivan Nifontov in the bronze medal match.
