= Alejandro Zúñiga =

Chilean judoka (born 1988)

Alejandro Sebastián Zúñiga Villarreal (Note: In this Spanish name, the first or paternal surname is Zúñiga and the second or maternal family name is Villarreal.) (born 12 May 1988, in Santiago) is a Chilean judoka. At the 2012 Summer Olympics he competed in the Men's 66 kg, but was defeated in the second round by the eventual gold medallist, Lasha Shavdatuashvili from Georgia. His parents are also judokas.
