= Tarlan Karimov =

Azerbaijani Olympic judoka

Personal information
- Born: 14 September 1986 (age 39)
- Occupation: Judoka

Sport
- Country: Azerbaijan
- Sport: Judo
- Weight class: –66 kg

Achievements and titles
- Olympic Games: 7th (2012)
- World Champ.: 7th (2011)
- European Champ.: (silver) (2011)
Medal record
Men's judo
Representing Azerbaijan
European Championships
Silver medal – second place	2011 Istanbul	–66 kg
World Masters
Bronze medal – third place	2011 Baku	–66 kg
IJF Grand Slam
Silver medal – second place	2014 Abu Dhabi	–66 kg
Bronze medal – third place	2016 Baku	–66 kg
IJF Grand Prix
Bronze medal – third place	2012 Baku	–66 kg
Bronze medal – third place	2015 Tbilisi	–66 kg

Profile at external databases
- IJF: 1760
- JudoInside.com: 52939
- Updated on 14 November 2022

Tarlan Karimov (born 14 September 1986, Sumgayit) is an Azerbaijani judoka. He won a silver medal at the 2011 European Judo Championships and reached the repêchage round of the 2011 World Judo Championships.

At the 2012 Summer Olympics, he won his first match against Musa Mogushkov, then beat Ahmed Awad, before losing to Sugoi Uriarte in the quarterfinals. Karimov qualified for the repechage, but lost in the first round of that to Paweł Zagrodnik.
