= Junpei Morishita =

Japanese judoka (born 1990)

Personal information
- Born: 5 April 1990 (age 36)
- Occupation: Judoka

Sport
- Country: Japan
- Sport: Judo
- Weight class: ‍–‍66 kg

Achievements and titles
- World Champ.: (2010)
- Asian Champ.: (gold) (2011)
Medal record
Men's judo
Representing Japan
World Championships
Gold medal – first place	2010 Tokyo	‍–‍66 kg
Asian Games
Bronze medal – third place	2010 Guangzhou	‍–‍66 kg
Asian Championships
Gold medal – first place	2011 Abu Dhabi	‍–‍66 kg
World Masters
Bronze medal – third place	2012 Almaty	‍–‍66 kg
IJF Grand Slam
Gold medal – first place	2011 Paris	‍–‍66 kg
Gold medal – first place	2012 Tokyo	‍–‍66 kg
Bronze medal – third place	2009 Tokyo	‍–‍66 kg
IJF Grand Prix
Bronze medal – third place	2011 Amsterdam	‍–‍66 kg
Bronze medal – third place	2012 Düsseldorf	‍–‍66 kg
World Juniors Championships
Gold medal – first place	2009 Paris	‍–‍66 kg

Profile at external databases
- IJF: 1344
- JudoInside.com: 50517
- Updated on 19 July 2023

Junpei Morishita (森下 純平, Morishita Junpei; born 5 April 1990 in Hakusan, Ishikawa) is a Japanese judoka. He won the gold medal in the half-lightweight division (66 kg) at the 2010 World Judo Championships.
