= Humaid Al-Derei =

Emirati judoka

Personal information
- Born: 16 April 1991 (age 34)
- Occupation: Judoka

Sport
- Sport: Judo

Profile at external databases
- JudoInside.com: 68513

Humaid Al-Derei (born 16 April 1991 in Meknès) is an Emirati judoka. At the 2012 Summer Olympics, he competed in the Men's 66 kg, but was defeated in the second round.
