= Dan Fâșie =

Romanian judoka (born 1987)

Personal information
- Born: 1 February 1987 (age 39)
- Occupation: Judoka

Sport
- Country: Romania
- Sport: Judo
- Weight class: –66 kg

Achievements and titles
- Olympic Games: R32 (2012)
- World Champ.: 5th (2009)
- European Champ.: 5th (2010)
Medal record
Men's judo
Representing Romania
European U23 Championships
Gold medal – first place	2006 Moscow	–66 kg
Silver medal – second place	2007 Salzburg	–66 kg
Bronze medal – third place	2008 Zagreb	–66 kg
European Junior Championships
Gold medal – first place	2006 Tallinn	–66 kg
European Cadet Championships
Silver medal – second place	2003 Baku	–55 kg

Profile at external databases
- IJF: 378
- JudoInside.com: 22952
- Updated on 2 February 2022

Dan Fasie (born 1 February 1987, Oradea, Romania) is a Romanian judoka. At the 2012 Summer Olympics he competed in the Men's 66 kg, but was defeated in the second round.
