= An Jeong-hwan =

South Korean judoka (born 1984)

Personal information
- Born: 28 January 1984 (age 42)
- Occupation: Judoka

Korean name
- Hangul: 안정환
- Hanja: 安正煥
- RR: An Jeonghwan
- MR: An Chŏnghwan

Sport
- Country: South Korea
- Sport: Judo
- Weight class: ‍–‍66 kg

Achievements and titles
- World Champ.: (bronze) (2009)
- Asian Champ.: (silver) (2009)
Medal record
Men's judo
Representing South Korea
World Championships
Bronze medal – third place	2009 Rotterdam	‍–‍66 kg
Asian Championships
Silver medal – second place	2009 Taipei	‍–‍66 kg
IJF Grand Slam
Silver medal – second place	2008 Tokyo	‍–‍66 kg
Bronze medal – third place	2009 Paris	‍–‍66 kg
Bronze medal – third place	2009 Tokyo	‍–‍66 kg
IJF Grand Prix
Silver medal – second place	2010 Düsseldorf	‍–‍66 kg

Profile at external databases
- IJF: 57
- JudoInside.com: 54546
- Updated on 13 August 2023

An Jeong-hwan (Korean: 안정환; born 28 January 1984) is a South Korean judoka.

An was born in Daegu, South Korea. He is a nephew of Olympic gold medalist Ahn Byeong-keun. At the age of 15, An moved to Japan and continued his judo career in Fukuoka. Upon graduation from Yamanashi Gakuin University in 2006, he came back to Korea and joined the Pohang City Hall judo club.

On 26 August 2009, An won a bronze medal in the ‍–‍66 kg division at the 2009 World Judo Championships in Rotterdam, Netherlands.
