= Martin Ivanov =

Bulgarian judoka (born 1988)

Personal information
- Born: 11 July 1988 (age 37)
- Occupation: Judoka

Sport
- Sport: Judo
Medal record
Representing Bulgaria
Men's sambo
Summer Universiade
Bronze medal – third place	2013 Kazan	-68 kg

Profile at external databases
- JudoInside.com: 43419

Martin Ivanov (Bulgarian: Мартин Иванов, born 11 July 1988, Sliven) is a Bulgarian judoka. At the 2012 Summer Olympics he competed in the Men's 66 kg, but was defeated in the second round by Sergey Lim of Kazakhstan.
