= Abraham Acevedo =

Paraguayan judoka (born 1989)

Personal information
- Born: 12 September 1989 (age 35)
- Occupation: Judoka

Sport
- Sport: Judo

Profile at external databases
- IJF: 7767
- JudoInside.com: 44312

Abraham Mora Acevedo (born 12 September 1989, in Asunción) is a Paraguayan judoka. At the 2012 Summer Olympics he competed in the Men's 66 kg, but was defeated in the second round.
