= Daniel García González =

Andorran Olympic judoka

Personal information
- Born: 9 October 1984 (age 41)
- Occupation: Judoka

Sport
- Sport: Judo
Medal record
Men's Judo
Representing Andorra
Games of the Small States of Europe
Gold medal – first place	2013 Luxembourg	73 kg

Profile at external databases
- IJF: 322
- JudoInside.com: 39235

Daniel García González (born 9 October 1984 in Andorra la Vella, Andorra) is an Andorran judoka. He competed in the Men's 66 kg category at the 2008 Summer Olympics and 2012 Summer Olympics.
