= Ivo Dos Santos =

Australian Olympic judoka

Personal information
- Born: 20 October 1985 (age 40) Lisbon, Portugal
- Occupation: Judoka
- Height: 1.69 m (5 ft 7 in)
- Weight
- Website: www.ivojudo.com

Sport
- Sport: Judo
- Weight class: 66 kg
- Rank: 4th dan black belt
- Club: Senshi Academy
- Now coaching: Coach

Achievements and titles
- Olympic Games: 2012
- Highest world ranking: 16th

Ivo Dos Santos (born 20 October 1985) is an Australian judoka. At the 2012 Summer Olympics he competed in the Men's 66 kg, but was defeated in the second round by Colin Oates from Great Britain. He has won four Australian National Judo titles. He has also won 6 Oceania titles.
