= Cho Jun-ho (judoka) =

South Korean judoka (born 1988)

Personal information
- Born: 16 December 1988 (age 37) Busan, South Korea
- Occupation: Judoka

Sport
- Country: South Korea
- Sport: Judo
- Weight class: ‍–‍66 kg

Achievements and titles
- Olympic Games: (bronze) (2012)
- World Champ.: (bronze) (2011)
- Asian Champ.: (bronze) (2011)
Medal record
Men's judo
Representing South Korea
Olympic Games
Bronze medal – third place	2012 London	‍–‍66 kg
World Championships
Bronze medal – third place	2011 Paris	‍–‍66 kg
Asian Championships
Bronze medal – third place	2011 Abu Dhabi	‍–‍66 kg
IJF Grand Slam
Silver medal – second place	2012 Paris	‍–‍66 kg
Bronze medal – third place	2011 Moscow	‍–‍66 kg
Bronze medal – third place	2013 Paris	‍–‍66 kg
IJF Grand Prix
Silver medal – second place	2011 Düsseldorf	‍–‍66 kg
Silver medal – second place	2011 Abu Dhabi	‍–‍66 kg
Silver medal – second place	2013 Ulaanbaatar	‍–‍66 kg

Profile at external databases
- IJF: 2171
- JudoInside.com: 48733
- Updated on 25 May 2023

Cho Jun-ho (Korean: 조준호, Korean pronunciation: [tɕo.dʑun.ɦo]; born 16 December 1988 in Busan) is a South Korean judoka. He won a bronze medal in the 66 kg event at the 2012 Summer Olympics. He currently coaches the Korean National Women's Judo team.

In addition to his judo career, Cho has also made numerous appearances on the Korean television sports variety show Cool Kiz on the Block as a coach. His appearances on the show made news headlines and he became highly searched on Korean search rankings after airings of the show due to his unexpected humour and wit.

== Family ==
Cho's family consists of his mother, father, and two brothers, all of whom have made guest appearances on the Korean television sports variety show Cool Kiz on the Block. They were nicknamed "the Judo Family" due to the whole family being highly involved in different aspects of the sport. Cho's identical twin brother, Cho Jun-hyun, was also a member of the Korean national judo team. His youngest brother, Cho Jun-hwi, is on the Korean judo national reserve team.

== Education ==
Samsung Middle School
Busan Sport High School
Yongin University

== Filmography ==
=== Television shows ===
Year	Title	Role	Notes	Ref.
2015–2016	Our Neighborhood Arts and Physical Education	Judo coach	Episodes 125–130, 132–143	
2019	High School Lunch Cook-off	Guest	Episode 10	
2019	Law of the Jungle in Sunda Islands	Cast Member	Episode 383–387	
2021	Playing Bro	Cast Member		
2021	Playing Bro 2	Cast Member		
2021	Still Alive	Main Cast	Chuseok pilot	
2021	Wild Idol	Trainer		
2022–present	Family Register Mate	Panelist	Episeode 3; Special member	
2022	The First Business in the World	Contestant		
