= Mirzohid Farmonov =

Uzbekistani judoka (born 1988)

Personal information
- Born: 29 February 1988 (age 38) Qashqadaryo
- Occupation: Judoka

Sport
- Country: Uzbekistan
- Sport: Judo
- Weight class: ‍–‍66 kg, ‍–‍73 kg

Achievements and titles
- Olympic Games: R16 (2012)
- World Champ.: 5th (2010)
- Asian Champ.: (silver) (2010)
Medal record
Men's judo
Representing Uzbekistan
Asian Games
Silver medal – second place	2010 Guangzhou	‍–‍66 kg
Bronze medal – third place	2014 Incheon	‍–‍66 kg
Bronze medal – third place	2014 Incheon	Men's team
Asian Championships
Bronze medal – third place	2011 Abu Dhabi	‍–‍66 kg
IJF Grand Slam
Gold medal – first place	2012 Moscow	‍–‍66 kg
Bronze medal – third place	2013 Moscow	‍–‍66 kg
IJF Grand Prix
Gold medal – first place	2013 Tashkent	‍–‍66 kg
Gold medal – first place	2016 Tashkent	‍–‍73 kg
Gold medal – first place	2017 Antalya	‍–‍73 kg
Bronze medal – third place	2018 Tunis	‍–‍73 kg
Asian Junior Championships
Bronze medal – third place	2007 Hyderabad	‍–‍66 kg

Profile at external databases
- IJF: 2203
- JudoInside.com: 50334
- Updated on 27 November 2022

Mirzahid Farmonov (born 29 February 1988 in Qashqadaryo) is an Uzbekistani judoka. At the 2012 Summer Olympics he competed in the Men's 66 kg and was defeated in the second round.
