= Sergey Lim =

Kazakh judoka (born 1987)

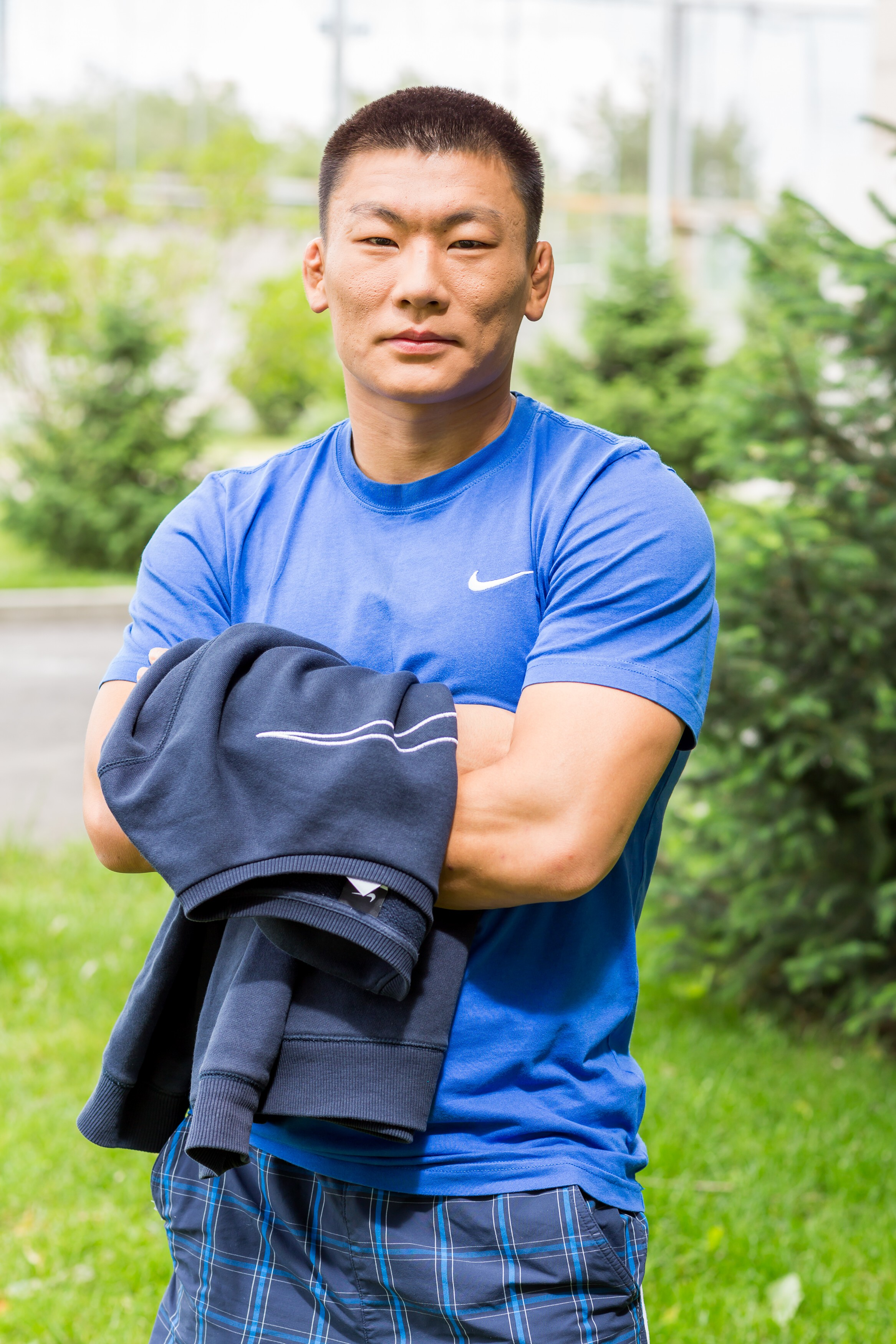
- Sergey Lim in June 2013

Personal information
- Full name: Sergey Georgiyevich Lim
- Born: 26 November 1987 (age 38) Almaty
- Occupation: Judoka

Sport
- Country: Kazakhstan
- Sport: Judo
- Weight class: ‍–‍66 kg

Achievements and titles
- Olympic Games: R16 (2016)
- World Champ.: R16 (2014)
- Asian Champ.: (gold) (2012)
Medal record
Men's judo
Representing Kazakhstan
Asian Championships
Gold medal – first place	2012 Tashkent	‍–‍66 kg
World Masters
Gold medal – first place	2013 Tyumen	‍–‍66 kg
IJF Grand Slam
Bronze medal – third place	2012 Paris	‍–‍66 kg
IJF Grand Prix
Bronze medal – third place	2011 Abu Dhabi	‍–‍66 kg
World Juniors Championships
Silver medal – second place	2006 Santo Domingo	‍–‍66 kg
Asian Junior Championships
Bronze medal – third place	2003 Macau	‍–‍60 kg
Bronze medal – third place	2005 Beirut	‍–‍66 kg
Bronze medal – third place	2006 Jeju	‍–‍66 kg

Profile at external databases
- IJF: 495
- JudoInside.com: 35265
- Updated on 20 November 2022

Sergey Georgiyevich Lim (Russian: Сергей Георгиевич Лим, born 26 November 1987 in Almaty) is a Kazakhstani judoka. At the 2012 Summer Olympics he competed in the Men's 66 kg, but was narrowly defeated in the third round by Masashi Ebinuma, who won with a left-handed “seoi nage” shoulder throw with 58 seconds left in the golden score period.

He won the 2013 IJF World Masters in Tyumen.
