= David Larose =

French judoka (born 1985)

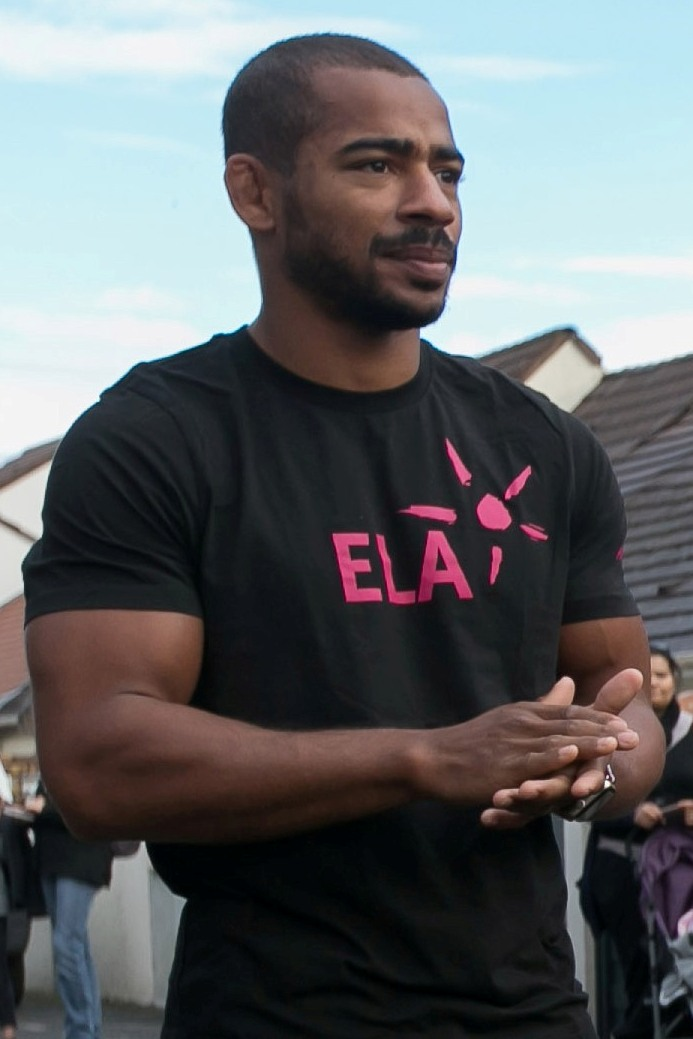
- Larose in 2017

Personal information
- Born: 4 July 1985 (age 40) Bondy, France
- Occupation: Judoka
- Height: 167 cm (5 ft 6 in)

Sport
- Country: France
- Sport: Judo
- Weight class: ‍–‍66 kg

Achievements and titles
- Olympic Games: R16 (2012)
- World Champ.: 7th (2005, 2011)
- European Champ.: (silver) (2014)
Medal record
Men's judo
Representing France
European Championships
Silver medal – second place	2014 Montpellier	‍–‍66 kg
Bronze medal – third place	2013 Budapest	‍–‍66 kg
World Masters
Bronze medal – third place	2010 Suwon	‍–‍66 kg
Bronze medal – third place	2013 Tyumen	‍–‍66 kg
IJF Grand Slam
Gold medal – first place	2012 Paris	‍–‍66 kg
Gold medal – first place	2013 Paris	‍–‍66 kg
Silver medal – second place	2012 Tokyo	‍–‍66 kg
Bronze medal – third place	2009 Rio de Janeiro	‍–‍66 kg
Bronze medal – third place	2010 Paris	‍–‍66 kg
Bronze medal – third place	2011 Paris	‍–‍66 kg
Bronze medal – third place	2011 Rio de Janeiro	‍–‍66 kg
Bronze medal – third place	2013 Tokyo	‍–‍66 kg
IJF Grand Prix
Gold medal – first place	2014 Samsun	‍–‍66 kg
World Juniors Championships
Gold medal – first place	2004 Budapest	‍–‍60 kg

Profile at external databases
- IJF: 1891
- JudoInside.com: 29810
- Updated on 14 November 2022

David Larose (born 4 July 1985 in Bondy, France) is a French judoka. He competed for France at the 2012 Summer Olympics.

== Achievements ==
Year	Tournament	Place	Weight class
2005	World Judo Championships	7th	Extra lightweight (60 kg)
2011	World Judo Championships	7th	Lightweight (66 kg)
2016	Panam Open	1st	Lightweight (66 kg)
2016	Euro Open	1st	Lightweight (66 kg)
2017	African Open	1st	Lightweight (66 kg)
2017	European Open	3rd	Lightweight (66 kg)
