= Rok Drakšič =

Slovenian judoka (born 1987)

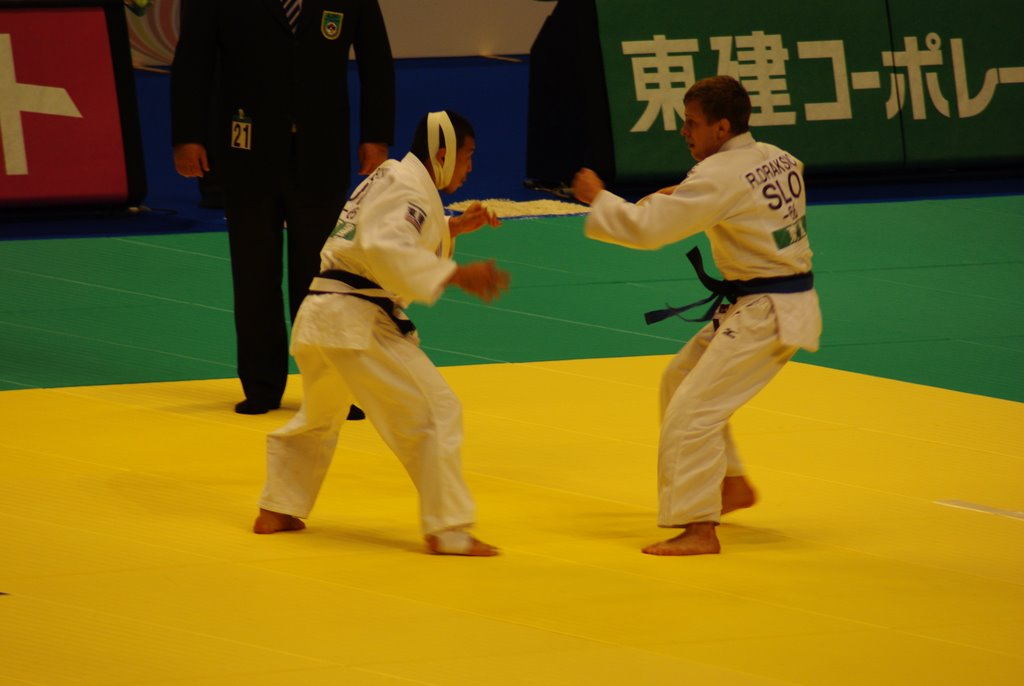
- Drakšič (right) in 2008 vs Egusa at the Kano Cup

Personal information
- Nickname: Rocky
- Born: 2 January 1987 (age 39)
- Occupation: Judoka

Sport
- Country: Slovenia
- Sport: Judo
- Weight class: ‍–‍66 kg, ‍–‍73 kg

Achievements and titles
- Olympic Games: R16 (2012)
- World Champ.: 5th (2011)
- European Champ.: (gold) (2013)
Medal record
Men's judo
Representing Slovenia
European Games
Bronze medal – third place	2015 Baku	‍–‍73 kg
European Championships
Gold medal – first place	2013 Budapest	‍–‍73 kg
Bronze medal – third place	2010 Vienna	‍–‍66 kg
Bronze medal – third place	2012 Chelyabinsk	‍–‍66 kg
Bronze medal – third place	2014 Montpellier	‍–‍73 kg
Bronze medal – third place	2016 Kazan	‍–‍73 kg
IJF Grand Slam
Silver medal – second place	2014 Paris	‍–‍73 kg
Bronze medal – third place	2013 Tokyo	‍–‍73 kg
Bronze medal – third place	2014 Abu Dhabi	‍–‍73 kg
IJF Grand Prix
Gold medal – first place	2011 Amsterdam	‍–‍66 kg
Gold medal – first place	2016 Budapest	‍–‍73 kg
Silver medal – second place	2012 Qingdao	‍–‍73 kg
Silver medal – second place	2013 Rijeka	‍–‍73 kg
Silver medal – second place	2015 Budapest	‍–‍73 kg
Bronze medal – third place	2013 Düsseldorf	‍–‍73 kg
Bronze medal – third place	2014 Düsseldorf	‍–‍73 kg
European U23 Championships
Gold medal – first place	2009 Antalya	‍–‍66 kg
Bronze medal – third place	2004 Ljubljana	‍–‍60 kg
World Juniors Championships
Bronze medal – third place	2006 Santo Domingo	‍–‍60 kg
European Junior Championships
Silver medal – second place	2004 Sofia	‍–‍60 kg
Silver medal – second place	2005 Zagreb	‍–‍60 kg
European Cadet Championships
Bronze medal – third place	2002 Győr	‍–‍55 kg
Mediterranean Games
Silver medal – second place	2005 Almeria	‍–‍60 kg
Bronze medal – third place	2009 Pescara	‍–‍66 kg

Profile at external databases
- IJF: 271
- JudoInside.com: 22441
- Updated on 17 February 2022

Rok Drakšič (born 2 January 1987 in Griže, Žalec, Slovenia) is a Slovenian judoka.

At the 2008 Summer Olympics Drakšič competed in the extra-lightweight category (‍–‍60 kg), losing to Masoud Haji Akhondzadeh in his first match.

At the 2012 Summer Olympics Drakšič competed in the half-lightweight category (‍–‍66 kg). He beat Ricardo Valderrama by ko-uchi-gari, but then lost to eventual silver medalist Miklós Ungvári.

After his competition career, Drakšič became head coach of the Finnish National Team where he has produced excellent results, and achieved Finland's first World Tour medals in eight years.

== Achievements ==
Year	Tournament	Place	Weight Class
2013	European Judo Championships	1st	–73 kg
2012	European Judo Championships	3rd	–66 kg
2011	World Judo Championships	5th	–66 kg
2010	European Judo Championships	3rd	–66 kg
2009	Mediterranean Games	3rd	–66 kg
2007	World Judo Championships	5th	Extra lightweight (–60 kg)
2007	European Judo Championships	7th	Extra lightweight (–60 kg)
2005	Mediterranean Games	2nd	Extra lightweight (–60 kg)
