= Armen Nazaryan (judoka) =

Armenian judoka (born 1982)

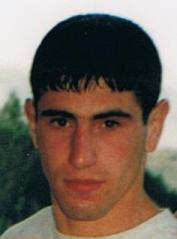

Personal information
- Born: 20 June 1982 (age 44)
- Occupation: Judoka

Sport
- Country: Armenia
- Sport: Judo
- Weight class: ‍–‍60 kg, ‍–‍66 kg

Achievements and titles
- Olympic Games: 13th (2004)
- World Champ.: 5th (2007)
- European Champ.: (gold) (2005)
Medal record
Men's judo
Representing Armenia
European Championships
| Gold medal – first place | 2005 Rotterdam | ‍–‍60 kg |
| Silver medal – second place | 2006 Tampere | ‍–‍60 kg |
| Bronze medal – third place | 2003 Düsseldorf | ‍–‍60 kg |
| Bronze medal – third place | 2004 Bucharest | ‍–‍60 kg |
IJF Grand Slam
| Silver medal – second place | 2011 Paris | ‍–‍66 kg |
European U23 Championships
| Gold medal – first place | 2003 Yerevan | ‍–‍60 kg |
| Bronze medal – third place | 2004 Ljubljana | ‍–‍60 kg |
Summer Universiade
| Bronze medal – third place | 2007 Bangkok | ‍–‍66 kg |
Super World Cup
| Gold medal – first place | 2008 Moscow | ‍–‍66 kg |
| Silver medal – second place | 2006 Moscow | ‍–‍66 kg |
| Bronze medal – third place | 2006 Paris | ‍–‍60 kg |
| Bronze medal – third place | 2006 Hamburg | ‍–‍66 kg |
| Bronze medal – third place | 2008 Hamburg | ‍–‍66 kg |
World Cup
| Gold medal – first place | 2005 Tallinn | ‍–‍60 kg |
| Silver medal – second place | 2003 Tallinn | ‍–‍60 kg |
| Silver medal – second place | 2004 Prag | ‍–‍60 kg |
| Bronze medal – third place | 2003 Tbilisi | ‍–‍60 kg |

Profile at external databases
- IJF: 414
- JudoInside.com: 13458
- Updated on 17 November 2022

Armen Nazaryan (Armenian: Արմեն Նազարյան, born 20 June 1982, in Hrazdan, Armenian SSR) is an Armenian judoka. Nazaryan was awarded the Master of Sport of Armenia, International Class title in 2005.

== Biography ==
Armen Nazaryan started judo in 1990 in the Sports School of Hrazdan. Nazaryan was first interested in boxing, but moved to judo in 1993. Since 1995, he has been trained by Karen Abagyan. In 2003, he became the Youth European Champion and won a bronze medal at the adult 2003 European Judo Championships. He won a bronze medal again at the 2004 European Judo Championships the following year and competed at the 2004 Summer Olympics in Athens. Nazaryan won a gold medal at the 2005 European Judo Championships in Rotterdam in the weight category of 60 kg. He won all five fights and defeated the reigning European Champion Ludwig Paischer of Austria in the final. With this success, Nazaryan became the first Armenian judoka to become a European Champion.

Nazaryan also won a gold medal at the 2005 World Cup in Tallinn. The next year, he won a silver medal at the 2006 European Judo Championships. In 2007, Nazaryan moved up to a heavier weight class of 66 kg and won a bronze medal at the 2007 Summer Universiade in Bangkok. Nazaryan won a gold medal at the 2008 Super World Cup in Moscow and participated at the 2008 Summer Olympics in Beijing. Nazaryan competed in the Olympics for a third time at the 2012 Summer Olympics. He announced before the Olympics began that it would be his last time competing.

== Achievements ==
| Year | Tournament | Place | Weight class |
|---|---|---|---|
| 2009 | European Judo Championships | 5th | Half lightweight (66 kg) |
| 2008 | European Judo Championships | 7th | Half lightweight (66 kg) |
| 2007 | World Judo Championships | 5th | Half lightweight (66 kg) |
| 2007 | Universiade | 3rd | Half lightweight (66 kg) |
| 2006 | European Judo Championships | 2nd | Extra lightweight (60 kg) |
| 2005 | European Judo Championships | 1st | Extra lightweight (60 kg) |
| 2004 | European Judo Championships | 3rd | Extra lightweight (60 kg) |
| 2003 | European Judo Championships | 3rd | Extra lightweight (60 kg) |
| 2002 | European Judo Championships | 7th | Extra lightweight (60 kg) |
