= Carlos Figueroa (judoka) =

Salvadoran judoka (born 1985)

Personal information
- Born: 27 March 1985 (age 41)
- Occupation: Judoka

Sport
- Sport: Judo
Medal record
Representing El Salvador
Men's judo
Pan American Judo Championships
Silver medal – second place	2010 San Salvador	66 kg

Profile at external databases
- JudoInside.com: 34560

Carlos Figueroa-Alarcón (born March 27, 1985) is a judoka from El Salvador, who competes in the -66 kg weight division. He competed at the 2012 Summer Olympics, but was eliminated by Canada's Sasha Mehmedovic in the first round.
