= Paweł Zagrodnik =

Polish judoka

Pawel Zagrodnik
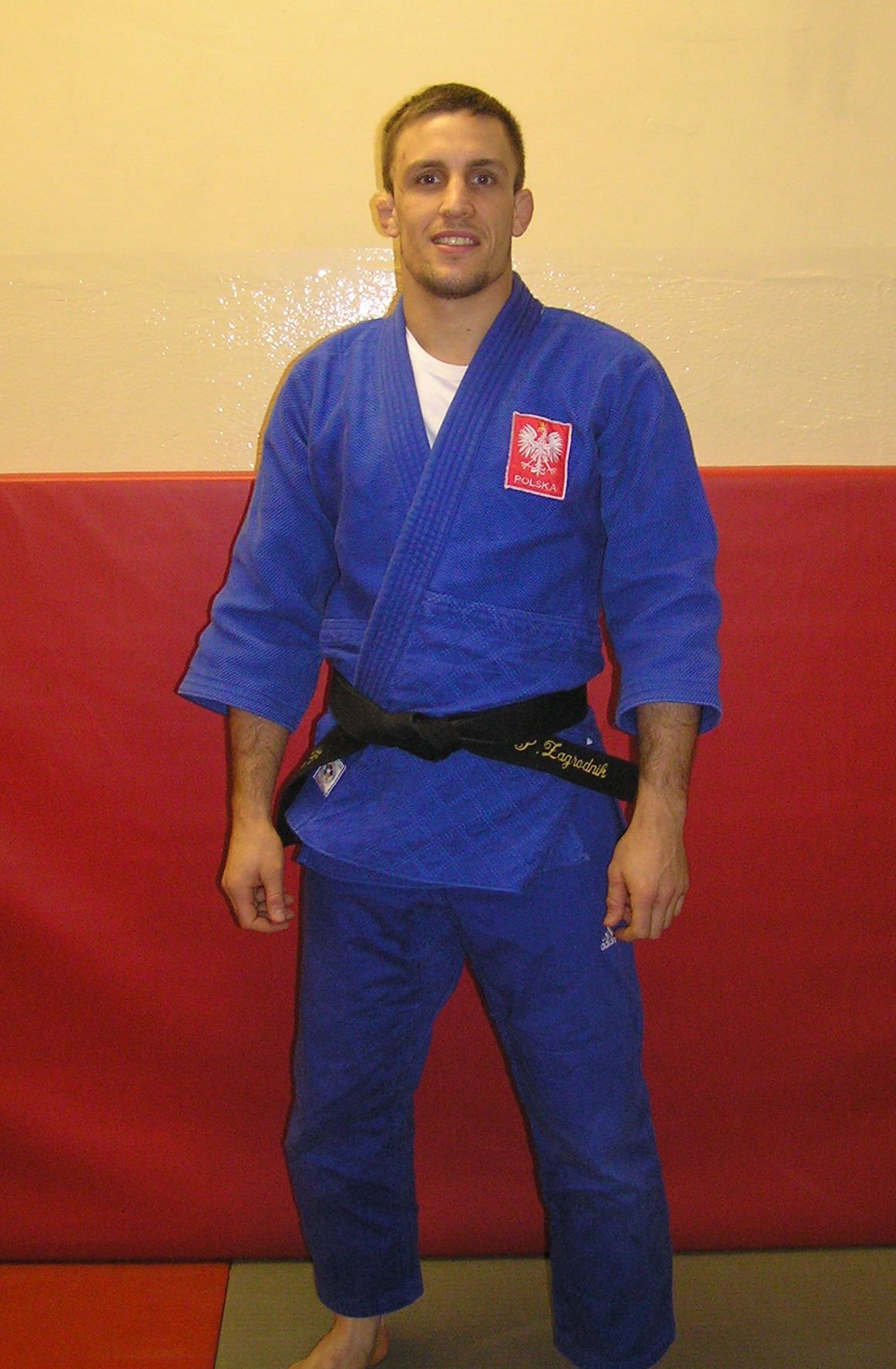

Personal information
- Nationality: Polish
- Born: 10 September 1987 (age 38) Ruda Śląska, Poland
- Occupation: Judoka
- Height: 175 cm (5 ft 9 in)

Sport
- Country: Poland
- Sport: Judo
- Weight class: –66 kg
Medal record
Men's Judo
Representing Poland
European Championships
Bronze medal – third place	Chelyabinsk 2012	Men's team
European U23 Championships
Silver medal – second place	2009 Antalya	–66 kg
Bronze medal – third place	2007 Salzburg	–66 kg
European Junior Championships
Bronze medal – third place	2006 Tallinn	–66 kg
World Cup
Gold medal – first place	2009 Budapest	–66 kg
Silver medal – second place	2011 Warsaw	–66 kg
Silver medal – second place	2011 San Salvador	–66 kg

Profile at external databases
- IJF: 39715
- JudoInside.com: 34685

Paweł Zagrodnik (born 10 September 1987, Ruda Śląska) is a Polish judoka.

In April 2012, he won a bronze medal at the 2012 European Judo Championships in the team competition. He competed for his country at the 2012 Summer Olympics in judo and achieved fourth position, losing in controversial circumstances to Masashi Ebinuma in his bronze medal match.
