= Raymond Ovinou =

Papua New Guinean judoka

Personal information
- Nationality: Papua New Guinea
- Born: 6 September 1984 (age 41) Port Moresby, Papua New Guinea
- Height: 175 cm (5 ft 9 in)
- Weight: 66 kg (146 lb)

Sport
- Sport: Judo
- Event: -66 kg
Medal record
Men's Judo
Representing Papua New Guinea
Pacific Games
| Bronze medal – third place | 2011 Nouméa | -66 kg |
- Updated on 20 September 2012

Raymond Ovinou (born 6 September 1984 in Port Moresby) is a Papua New Guinean judoka. At the 2012 Summer Olympics he competed in the Men's 66 kg, but was defeated in the second round. At the 2014 Commonwealth Games, he reached the last 16. At the 2016 Summer Olympics, he competed in the Men's 66 kg, but was defeated by Antoine Bouchard in the first round.
