= Sugoi Uriarte =

Spanish judoka (born 1984)

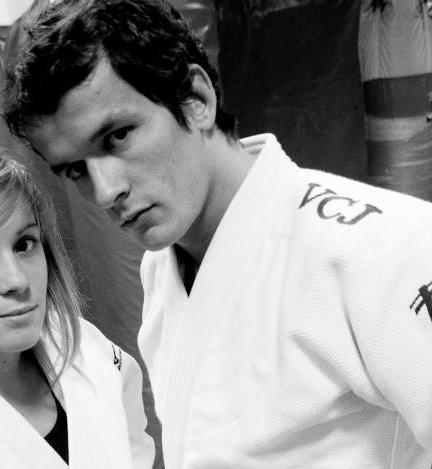
- Uriarte at the 2012

Personal information
- Full name: Sugoi Uriarte Marcos
- Nationality: Spain
- Born: 14 May 1984 (age 42) Vitoria-Gasteiz, Spain
- Occupation: Judoka
- Height: 172 cm (5 ft 8 in)

Sport
- Country: Spain
- Sport: Judo
- Weight class: ‍–‍66 kg
- Club: Valencia Club Judo
- Coached by: Ronaldo Veitia Jr; Salvador Gómez

Achievements and titles
- Olympic Games: 5th (2012)
- World Champ.: (silver) (2009)
- European Champ.: (gold) (2010)
Medal record
Men's judo
Representing Spain
World Championships
Silver medal – second place	2009 Rotterdam	‍–‍66 kg
European Championships
Gold medal – first place	2010 Vienna	‍–‍66 kg
World Masters
Bronze medal – third place	2011 Baku	‍–‍66 kg
IJF Grand Slam
Silver medal – second place	2009 Moscow	‍–‍66 kg
Silver medal – second place	2011 Rio de Janeiro	‍–‍66 kg
Bronze medal – third place	2015 Baku	‍–‍66 kg
Bronze medal – third place	2016 Baku	‍–‍66 kg
IJF Grand Prix
Gold medal – first place	2009 Tunis	‍–‍66 kg
Silver medal – second place	2011 Baku	‍–‍66 kg
Silver medal – second place	2014 Havana	‍–‍66 kg
Bronze medal – third place	2013 Abu Dhabi	‍–‍66 kg
Bronze medal – third place	2014 Tashkent	‍–‍66 kg
European U23 Championships
Bronze medal – third place	2006 Moscow	‍–‍66 kg
Summer Universiade
Silver medal – second place	2007 Bangkok	‍–‍66 kg

Profile at external databases
- IJF: 470
- JudoInside.com: 22063
- Updated on 13 August 2023

Sugoi Uriarte Marcos (Note: In this Spanish name, the first or paternal surname is Uriarte and the second or maternal family name is Marcos.) (born 14 May 1984) is a Spanish judoka who won a silver medal at the 2009 World Judo Championships. He competed at the 2012 and 2016 Olympic Games and reached semifinals in 2012.

Uriarte took up judo aged five. He is married to the fellow Olympics judoka Laura Gómez and is trained by her father. Uriarte has master's degrees in engineering and sport administration. His mother died shortly before the 2012 Olympics.
