= 2009 World Judo Championships =

Judo competition

Judo 2009 World Judo Championships
- Venue: Rotterdam Ahoy
- Location: Rotterdam, Netherlands
- Dates: 26–30 August 2009
- Competitors: 538 from 97 nations

Competition at external databases
- Links: IJF • EJU • JudoInside

The 2009 World Judo Championships was held in the Ahoy indoor sporting arena in Rotterdam, the Netherlands on 26 to 30 August.

Women's heavyweight champion Tong Wen was stripped of her gold medal because of a doping offence, but was later reinstated.

== Categories ==
- Men's: 60 kg, 66 kg, 73 kg, 81 kg, 90 kg, 100 kg, +100 kg
- Women's: 48 kg, 52 kg, 57 kg, 63 kg, 70 kg, 78 kg, +78 kg

== Schedule ==
- Wednesday the 26th of August
  - Men -60 kg and -66 kg
  - Women -48 kg
- Thursday the 27th of August
  - Men -73 kg
  - Women -52 kg and -57 kg
- Friday the 28th of August
  - Men -81 kg
  - Women -63 kg
- Saturday the 29th of August
  - Men -90 kg
  - Women -70 kg and -78 kg
- Sunday the 30th of August
  - Men -100 kg and +100 kg
  - Women +78 kg

== Medal overview ==
=== Men's events ===
Event	Gold	Silver	Bronze
Extra-lightweight (60 kg)	Georgii Zantaraia (UKR)	Hiroaki Hiraoka (JPN)	Hovhannes Davtyan (ARM)
Extra-lightweight (60 kg)	Georgii Zantaraia (UKR)	Hiroaki Hiraoka (JPN)	Elio Verde (ITA)
Half-lightweight (66 kg)	Khashbaataryn Tsagaanbaatar (MGL)	Sugoi Uriarte (ESP)	Miklós Ungvari (HUN)
Half-lightweight (66 kg)	Khashbaataryn Tsagaanbaatar (MGL)	Sugoi Uriarte (ESP)	An Jeong-Hwan (KOR)
Lightweight (73 kg)	Wang Ki-Chun (KOR)	Kim Chol-Su (PRK)	Dirk Van Tichelt (BEL)
Lightweight (73 kg)	Wang Ki-Chun (KOR)	Kim Chol-Su (PRK)	Mansur Isaev (RUS)
Half-middleweight (81 kg)	Ivan Nifontov (RUS)	Siarhei Shundzikau (BLR)	Ole Bischof (GER)
Half-middleweight (81 kg)	Ivan Nifontov (RUS)	Siarhei Shundzikau (BLR)	Kim Jae-Bum (KOR)
Middleweight (90 kg)	Lee Kyu-Won (KOR)	Kirill Denisov (RUS)	Hesham Mesbah (EGY)
Middleweight (90 kg)	Lee Kyu-Won (KOR)	Kirill Denisov (RUS)	Dilshod Choriev (UZB)
Half-heavyweight (100 kg)	Maxim Rakov (KAZ)	Henk Grol (NED)	Ramadan Darwish (EGY)
Half-heavyweight (100 kg)	Maxim Rakov (KAZ)	Henk Grol (NED)	Takamasa Anai (JPN)
Heavyweight (+100 kg)	Teddy Riner (FRA)	Óscar Braison (CUB)	Abdullo Tangriev (UZB)
Heavyweight (+100 kg)	Teddy Riner (FRA)	Óscar Braison (CUB)	Marius Paškevičius (LTU)

=== Women's events ===
Event	Gold	Silver	Bronze
Extra-lightweight (48 kg)	Tomoko Fukumi (JPN)	Oiana Blanco (ESP)	Chung Jung-Yeon (KOR)
Extra-lightweight (48 kg)	Tomoko Fukumi (JPN)	Oiana Blanco (ESP)	Frédérique Jossinet (FRA)
Half-lightweight (52 kg)	Misato Nakamura (JPN)	Yanet Bermoy (CUB)	Ana Carrascosa (ESP)
Half-lightweight (52 kg)	Misato Nakamura (JPN)	Yanet Bermoy (CUB)	Romy Tarangul (GER)
Lightweight (57 kg)	Morgane Ribout (FRA)	Telma Monteiro (POR)	Kifayat Gasimova (AZE)
Lightweight (57 kg)	Morgane Ribout (FRA)	Telma Monteiro (POR)	Hedvig Karakas (HUN)
Half-middleweight (63 kg)	Yoshie Ueno (JPN)	Elisabeth Willeboordse (NED)	Claudia Malzahn (GER)
Half-middleweight (63 kg)	Yoshie Ueno (JPN)	Elisabeth Willeboordse (NED)	Alice Schlesinger (ISR)
Middleweight (70 kg)	Yuri Alvear (COL)	Anett Mészáros (HUN)	Mina Watanabe (JPN)
Middleweight (70 kg)	Yuri Alvear (COL)	Anett Mészáros (HUN)	Houda Miled (TUN)
Half-heavyweight (78 kg)	Marhinde Verkerk (NED)	Marina Pryschepa (UKR)	Heide Wollert (GER)
Half-heavyweight (78 kg)	Marhinde Verkerk (NED)	Marina Pryschepa (UKR)	Yi Sun (CHN)
Heavyweight (+78 kg)	Tong Wen (CHN)	Karina Bryant (GBR)	Idalys Ortiz (CUB)
Heavyweight (+78 kg)	Tong Wen (CHN)	Karina Bryant (GBR)	Maki Tsukada (JPN)

=== Medal table ===
* Host nation (Netherlands)

Rank	Nation	Gold	Silver	Bronze	Total
1	Japan	3	1	3	7
2	South Korea	2	0	3	5
3	France	2	0	1	3
4	Netherlands*	1	2	0	3
5	Russia	1	1	1	3
6	Ukraine	1	1	0	2
7	China	1	0	1	2
8	Colombia	1	0	0	1
8	Kazakhstan	1	0	0	1
8	Mongolia	1	0	0	1
11	Cuba	0	2	1	3
11	Spain	0	2	1	3
13	Hungary	0	1	2	3
14	Belarus	0	1	0	1
14	Great Britain	0	1	0	1
14	North Korea	0	1	0	1
14	Portugal	0	1	0	1
18	Germany	0	0	4	4
19	Egypt	0	0	2	2
19	Uzbekistan	0	0	2	2
21	Armenia	0	0	1	1
21	Azerbaijan	0	0	1	1
21	Belgium	0	0	1	1
21	Israel	0	0	1	1
21	Italy	0	0	1	1
21	Lithuania	0	0	1	1
21	Tunisia	0	0	1	1
Totals (27 entries)		14	14	28	56

== See also ==
- Judo at the 2008 Summer Olympics
