= 2015 World Judo Championships – Men's 73 kg =

Judo competition

Judo Men's 73 kg at the 2015 World Judo Championships
- Venue: Alau Ice Palace
- Location: Astana, Kazakhstan
- Date: 26 August
- Competitors: 76 from 56 nations
- Total prize money: 14,000$

Medalists
| gold medal | Shohei Ono (2nd title) | Japan |
| silver medal | Riki Nakaya | Japan |
| bronze medal | Sainjargalyn Nyam-Ochir | Mongolia |
| bronze medal | An Chang-rim | South Korea |

Competition at external databases
- Links: IJF • JudoInside

The men's 73 kg competition of the 2015 World Judo Championships was held on 26 August 2015.

== Results ==
=== Finals ===
Semi-finals
(Japan) Shohei Ono | 110
(South Korea) An Chang-rim | 010
(North Korea) Hong Kuk-hyon | 000
(Japan) Riki Nakaya | 100

Final
(Japan) Shohei Ono | 010
(Japan) Riki Nakaya | 000

=== Repechage ===
| Repechage | | Third place |
| (Israel) Sagi Muki | 000 |
| (Mongolia) Sainjargalyn Nyam-Ochir | 001 | (Mongolia) Sainjargalyn Nyam-Ochir | 001 |
| | | (North Korea) Hong Kuk-hyon | 000 |

| Repechage | | Third place |
| (Mongolia) Ganbaataryn Odbayar | 001 |
| (Hungary) Miklós Ungvári | 000 | (Mongolia) Ganbaataryn Odbayar | 000 |
| | | (South Korea) An Chang-rim | 000 |

=== Pool A ===
First round fights

| | Score | |
|---|---|---|
| Arthur Margelidon (Canada) | 100–000 | (Palestine) Wesam Abu Rmilah |
| Pierre Duprat (France) | 100–000 | (Georgia (country)) Lasha Shavdatuashvili |
| Sai Yinjirigala (China) | 001–000 | (Uzbekistan) Mirali Sharipov |

Second Round
(Israel) Sagi Muki | 010
(Belgium) Dirk Van Tichelt | 000
(Canada) Arthur Margelidon | 100
(Sweden) Tommy Macias | 000
(France) Pierre Duprat | 100
(American Samoa) Benjamin Waterhouse | 000
(Spain) Kiyoshi Uematsu | 100
(Puerto Rico) Augusto Miranda | 000
(Japan) Shohei Ono | 100
(China) Sai Yinjirigala | 000
(Peru) Alonso Wong | 000
(Portugal) Jorge Fernandes | 000
(Belarus) Vadzim Shoka | 100
(Serbia) Aleksej Nefedov | 000

Third Round
(Israel) Sagi Muki | 100
(Canada) Arthur Margelidon | 000
(France) Pierre Duprat | 000
(Spain) Kiyoshi Uematsu | 100
(Japan) Shohei Ono | 101
(Portugal) Jorge Fernandes | 000
(Belarus) Vadzim Shoka | 000
(Greece) Georgios Azoidis | 000

Fourth Round
(Israel) Sagi Muki | 100
(Spain) Kiyoshi Uematsu | 000
(Japan) Shohei Ono | 100
(Belarus) Vadzim Shoka | 000

Quarterfinals
(Israel) Sagi Muki | 000
(Japan) Shohei Ono | 013

=== Pool B ===
First round fights

| | Score | |
|---|---|---|
| Dastan Ykybayev (Kazakhstan) | 011–100 | (Czech Republic) Jakub Ječmínek |
| Dmitrijs Fedosejenkovs (Latvia) | 000–000 | (Azerbaijan) Huseyn Rahimli |
| Mohammed Alharbi (Saudi Arabia) | 001–011 | (Cyprus) Neoklis Skouroumounis |

Second Round
(Netherlands) Dex Elmont | 101
(Nauru) Sled Dowabobo | 000
(South Korea) An Chang-rim | 100
(Germany) Igor Wandtke | 000
(Montenegro) Nikola Gušić | 100
(Cuba) Magdiel Estrada | 000
(Russia) Mansur Isaev | 100
(Czech Republic) Jakub Ječmínek | 000
(Slovenia) Rok Drakšič | 100
(Ukraine) Serhiy Drebot | 000
(Afghanistan) Mod Reshad Aryan | 010
(Azerbaijan) Huseyn Rahimli | 100
(Cyprus) Neoklis Skouroumounis | 000
(Tajikistan) Karomatullo Khakimov | 100

Third Round
(Netherlands) Dex Elmont | 000
(South Korea) An Chang-rim | 010
(Montenegro) Nikola Gušić | 000
(Russia) Mansur Isaev | 000
(Slovenia) Rok Drakšič | 010
(Azerbaijan) Huseyn Rahimli | 000
(Mongolia) Sainjargalyn Nyam-Ochir | 101
(Tajikistan) Karomatullo Khakimov | 000

Fourth Round
(South Korea) An Chang-rim | 100
(Montenegro) Nikola Gušić | 000
(Slovenia) Rok Drakšič | 000
(Mongolia) Sainjargalyn Nyam-Ochir | 101

Quarterfinals
(South Korea) An Chang-rim | 110
(Mongolia) Sainjargalyn Nyam-Ochir | 000

=== Pool C ===
First round fights

| | Score | |
|---|---|---|
| Sun Shuai (China) | 100–000 | (Monaco) Cédric Bessi |
| Térence Kouamba Poutoukou (Gabon) | 000–110 | (Belgium) Sami Chouchi |
| Marcelo Contini (Brazil) | 100–000 | (Ghana) Emmanuel Nartey |

Second Round
(Georgia (country)) Nugzar Tatalashvili | 000
(Ukraine) Dmytro Kaniivets | 000
(China) Sun Shuai | 110
(Latvia) Mihails Šteinbuks | 000
(Belgium) Sami Chouchi | 100
(Argentina) Alejandro Clara | 000
(Mongolia) Ganbaataryn Odbayar | 100
(Russia) Musa Mogushkov | 000
(North Korea) Hong Kuk-hyon | 100
(Hong Kong) Cheung Chi Yip | 000
(Brazil) Marcelo Contini | 100
(Canada) Étienne Briand | 000
(Poland) Damian Szwarnowiecki | 000
(Czech Republic) Jaromír Ježek | 002
(Tajikistan) Shukhratjoni Farkhizoda | 001
(Haiti) Josué Deprez | 000

Third Round
(Georgia (country)) Nugzar Tatalashvili | 011
(China) Sun Shuai | 010
(Belgium) Sami Chouchi | 000
(Mongolia) Ganbaataryn Odbayar | 100
(North Korea) Hong Kuk-hyon | 000
(Brazil) Marcelo Contini | 000
(Czech Republic) Jaromír Ježek | 001
(Tajikistan) Shukhratjoni Farkhizoda | 001

Fourth Round
(Georgia (country)) Nugzar Tatalashvili | 000
(Mongolia) Ganbaataryn Odbayar | 000
(North Korea) Hong Kuk-hyon | 011
(Czech Republic) Jaromír Ježek | 001

Quarterfinals
(Mongolia) Ganbaataryn Odbayar | 000
(North Korea) Hong Kuk-hyon | 010

=== Pool D ===
First round fights

| | Score | |
|---|---|---|
| Eetu Laamanen (Finland) | 100–000 | (Turkey) Hasan Vanlıoğlu |
| Tohar Butbul (Israel) | 001–000 | (Puerto Rico) Adrián Gandía |
| Adrian Leat (New Zealand) | 000–110 | (Belarus) Aliaksei Ramanchyk |

Second Round
(Japan) Riki Nakaya | 100
(Australia) Jake Bensted | 000
(Spain) Javier Ramírez | 000
(Finland) Eetu Laamanen | 000
(Norway) Martin Thiblin | 000
(Kyrgyzstan) Tariel Usenov | 100
(Angola) Pedro Hebo | 000
(Uzbekistan) Sharofiddin Boltaboev | 100
(Hungary) Miklós Ungvári | 001
(Israel) Tohar Butbul | 000
(Portugal) André Alves | 100
(Ivory Coast) Rudolphe Affro | 001
(United Arab Emirates) Victor Scvortov | 000
(Netherlands) Sam van 't Westende | 000
(Egypt) Mohamed Mohyeldin | 000
(Belarus) Aliaksei Ramanchyk | 010

Third Round
(Japan) Riki Nakaya | 101
(Spain) Javier Ramírez | 000
(Kyrgyzstan) Tariel Usenov | 000
(Uzbekistan) Sharofiddin Boltaboev | 100
(Hungary) Miklós Ungvári | 001
(Portugal) André Alves | 000
(Netherlands) Sam van 't Westende | 000
(Belarus) Aliaksei Ramanchyk | 011

Fourth Round
(Japan) Riki Nakaya | 100
(Uzbekistan) Sharofiddin Boltaboev | 000
(Hungary) Miklós Ungvári | 100
(Belarus) Aliaksei Ramanchyk | 000

Quarterfinals
(Japan) Riki Nakaya | 100
(Hungary) Miklós Ungvári | 000

== Prize money ==
The sums listed bring the total prizes awarded to 14,000$ for the individual event.

| Medal | Total | Judoka | Coach |
|---|---|---|---|
| Gold | 6,000$ | 4,800$ | 1,200$ |
| Silver | 4,000$ | 3,200$ | 800$ |
| Bronze | 2,000$ | 1,600$ | 400$ |
