= Riki Nakaya =

Japanese judoka (born 1989)

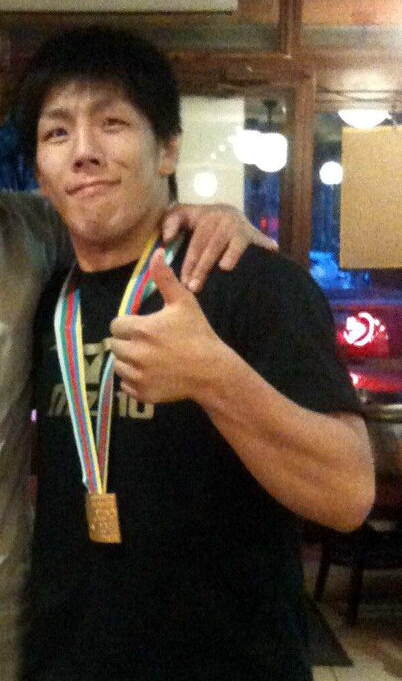
- Nakaya in Paris, France in 2013

Personal information
- Native name: 中矢力
- Born: 25 July 1989 (age 37) Matsuyama, Ehime, Japan
- Home town: Tokyo
- Education: Tokai University
- Occupation: Judoka
- Height: 168 cm (5 ft 6 in)

Sport
- Country: Japan
- Sport: Judo
- Weight class: –73 kg
- Rank: 5th dan black belt
- Club: Sohgo Security (ALSOK)
- Coached by: Kenzo Nakamura

Achievements and titles
- Olympic Games: (silver) (2012)
- World Champ.: (gold) (2011, 2014)
- Asian Champ.: (silver) (2011)
Medal record
Men's judo
Representing Japan
Olympic Games
Silver medal – second place	2012 London	‍–‍73 kg
World Championships
Gold medal – first place	2011 Paris	‍–‍73 kg
Gold medal – first place	2014 Chelyabinsk	‍–‍73 kg
Gold medal – first place	2017 Budapest	Mixed team
Silver medal – second place	2015 Astana	‍–‍73 kg
Asian Championships
Silver medal – second place	2011 Abu Dhabi	‍–‍73 kg
World Masters
Silver medal – second place	2012 Almaty	‍–‍73 kg
Bronze medal – third place	2015 Rabat	‍–‍73 kg
IJF Grand Slam
Gold medal – first place	2010 Tokyo	‍–‍73 kg
Gold medal – first place	2011 Paris	‍–‍73 kg
Gold medal – first place	2011 Rio de Janeiro	‍–‍73 kg
Gold medal – first place	2013 Tokyo	‍–‍73 kg
Silver medal – second place	2012 Tokyo	‍–‍73 kg
Silver medal – second place	2017 Baku	‍–‍73 kg
Bronze medal – third place	2011 Tokyo	‍–‍73 kg
World Juniors Championships
Bronze medal – third place	2008 Bangkok	‍–‍73 kg
Asian Junior Championships
Silver medal – second place	2007 Hyderabad	‍–‍73 kg
Silver medal – second place	2008 Sana'a	‍–‍73 kg

Profile at external databases
- IJF: 2003
- JudoInside.com: 46279
- Updated on 25 May 2023

Riki Nakaya (中矢 力, Nakaya Riki; born 25 July 1989) is a Japanese judoka. He is a two-time lightweight world champion and an Olympic silver medalist. He was also a finalist at the 2015 World Championships.

== Personal life ==
Nakaya began judo in kindergarten, following his older brother.

Nakaya married his high school sweetheart in 2014, and they have a one-year-old child.

Nakaya is sponsored by Sohgo Security (ALSOK) and Gillette.

== Career ==
=== Junior career: 2007-2008 ===
Nakaya won medals in several competitions in his junior career. He has competed in the lightweight division since he was a junior judoka. In 2007, Nakaya won the A-Tournament U20 in Saint Petersburg, and came second in the Asian U20 Championships in Hyderabad. In 2008, he won bronze medals at the A-Tournament U20 in Lyon and World U20 Championships in Bangkok. Nakaya made his transition to the senior level at the All Japan Championships in Fukuoka, finishing third.

=== 2009 Grand Slam Tokyo and All Japan Championships ===
Nakaya entered his first international senior tournament at the Grand Slam in Tokyo. After winning by ippon and two yukos in both round of 64 and 32, he lost by waza-ari to Canada's Nicholas Tritton, ending his first IJF outing in his third fight.

Nakaya again won the bronze medal at the All Japan Championships.

=== 2010 World Cup Vienna, All Japan Championships and Grand Prix Rotterdam ===
Nakaya won all his fights by ippon en route to the final at the World Cup in Vienna. He lost to fellow Japanese and local lightweight number one Hiroyuki Akimoto in the final when Akimoto scored two waza-aris for ippon.

Nakaya won the bronze medal for the third consecutive time at the All Japan Championships.

At the Grand Prix in Rotterdam, Nakaya failed to win a medal when he lost to Poland's Tomasz Adamiec by two waza-aris in the quarter-final.

=== Breakthrough: 2010 Grand Slam Tokyo and 2011 Grand Slam Paris ===
Nakaya made a breakthrough in his career in his second Tokyo Grand Slam. He faced against fellow countryman Yuki Nishiyama in the final, and won the gold medal by defeating Nishiyama with juji-gatame for ippon.

Nakaya continued his winning streak in his first Paris Grand Slam. He defeated the Netherlands' Dex Elmont in the quarter-final, fellow Japanese Yasuhiro Awano in the semi-final, and Hungary's Attila Ungvari in the final, all by ippon, giving him his second IJF circuit and Grand Slam title.

=== 2011 World Cup Budapest and Asian Championships ===
Nakaya reached the semi-final of the World Cup in Budapest, and lost to Ungvari in a revenge match by ippon. He then won the bronze medal by defeating Ukraine's Petro Kuzmin.

Nakaya then competed in his first and only continental tournament in his career in Abu Dhabi. He reached the final after winning all his fights by ippon, but was faced against double world champion Wang Ki-chun, and lost by waza-ari, leaving him to settle for silver.

=== New era of dominance: 2011 Grand Slam Rio de Janeiro and World Championships ===
Nakaya won his third Grand Slam in Rio de Janeiro, winning three of his five fights by ippon. He defeated Portugal's João Pina in the final by ippon.

Nakaya continued Japan's dominance in the lightweight division, taking over from Akimoto as the world champion. He played ippon judo in his first five fights, before meeting defending champion Akimoto in the semi-final. He defeated Akimoto with an osoto gari for waza-ari, and was set against Elmont in the final.

In the final, no actual throws were scored, but a yuko was awarded to Nakaya due to a second shido given to Elmont. He defeated Elmont in a scoreless and shido-filled fight to become world champion.

Nakaya became the world number one in the lightweight division in September 2011.

=== Decline and shock defeat at the 2012 Olympics ===
Nakaya surprisingly failed to win a medal at his first outing as world champion at home ground at the 2011 Grand Slam in Tokyo. After beating Russia's Murat Kodzokov in the quarter-final by ippon and yuko, he was defeated by long-time rival Akimoto by ippon in the semi-final, leaving him medal-less at fifth place.

Nakaya's first outing at a Masters was in Almaty in 2012, and beat his first two opponents by ippon. Nakaya then met Akimoto again in the semi-final, and narrowly won by shido. He was set to face world number two Wang in the final. In a turn of events, it was again a score-less fight, and Wang would be the one to defeat Nakaya by shido, leaving him to settle for silver.

En route to the Olympics, Nakaya appeared to be on-form and earned his spot to represent Japan in London after winning his first All Japan Championships just two months before the Games. He defeated future rival Shohei Ono in the final to be Japan's lightweight representative.

At the Olympics, Nakaya defeated his first two opponents by ippon, and scraped through to the final by beating Tajikistan's Rasul Boqiev by yuko, and Elmont by shido. He then faced Russia's Mansur Isaev in the final. Isaev scored a yuko with a kata guruma counter, and eventually won. Many spectators and commentators were critical of Isaev's celebration, where he crawled on top of Nakaya to celebrate. Nakaya was one of Japan's three silver medalists, and with only Kaori Matsumoto winning gold, it was the country's worst judo campaign at the Olympics.

=== Rivalry and loss of dominance to Shohei Ono: 2013 World Championships ===
Nakaya continued his losing streak at the 2012 Grand Slam in Tokyo, where he lost to rising star Ono in the final by ippon and waza-ari.

However, in the 2013 All Japan Championships, Nakaya managed to regain his title, beating Nishiyama in the final.

At the 2013 World Championships, Nakaya defeated his first two opponents by ippon, and then won against Taipei's Huang Chun-ta by waza-ari. He then faced Mongolia's Sainjargalyn Nyam-Ochir in the quarter-final, where Sainjargalyn threw him with osoto guruma for ippon. Nakaya was unable to compete in the repechage as he had suffered a concussion from the throw, and had to be hospitalized.

In Nakaya's absence, the world championship title was passed on to the third consecutive Japanese lightweight, Ono.

=== Return to form and second World Championship title ===
"Research has been the secret to my success. I always know what techniques would work against my opponent. Nothing is certain, [but] research is the only way you can really prepare. Evolving as a judoka... is vital for success too." - Nakaya on how he won his second World title

Nakaya won his second Grand Slam in Tokyo in 2013, beating all his opponents by ippon, making it his first all-ippon tournament. He defeated South Korea's Bang Gui-man in the final with osaekomi-waza.

At the Grand Slam in Paris in 2014, just six months before the world championships, Nakaya experienced a set-back when he was defeated by Isaev by ippon in the second round.

Nakaya's set-backs continued to mount with his loss to rival Ono at the 2014 All Japan Championships final, where Ono threw him with an uki otoshi for ippon, leaving Nakaya to settle for silver.

At the 2014 World Championships, Nakaya came in ranked number sixteen, and had a difficult match list with budding stars like Israel's Sagi Muki and Azerbaijan's Rustam Orujov. He managed to defeat them both by waza-ari and yuko, respectively. Nakaya then faced 2013 Asian Champion Hong Kuk-hyon, ranked number 32, in the final, who had equally difficult opponents in the form of Dirk Van Tichelt, Nugzar Tatalashvili and Ugo Legrand. It was an unlikely match up with unseeded finalists.

Nakaya defeated Hong with one of his signature skills ippon seoi nage for ippon, earning him his second World Championship title.

=== 2015 All Japan Championships, Masters Rabat and World Championships ===
Nakaya's first tournament in 2015 was the All Japan Championships, where both Nakaya and long-time rival Ono won only bronze medals.

He then participated at the Masters in Rabat, where he won by ippon in his first two fights. He was defeated by Georgia's Tatalashvili by ippon and yuko in the semi-final. Nakaya met Mongolia's Odbayar Ganbaatar in the bronze medal contest, and defeated him by ippon.

Nakaya then competed in his fourth world championships in Astana, where he played ippon judo en route to the final. He defeated long-time opponents Ungvari, in the quarter-final, and Hong, in the semi-final. He met teammate and prime rival Ono in the final, where he lost by waza-ari, leaving him to settle for silver.

=== Qualifying and selection for the 2016 Olympics ===
Nakaya's post-World Championships outings have both ended without a medal. At the 2015 Grand Slam in Tokyo, Nakaya lost in his second fight against Musa Mogushkov by waza-ari and yuko. He had a better tournament at the 2016 Grand Slam in Paris, winning thrice by ippon. He lost against eventual finalist Akimoto in the quarter-final by ippon, then had to concede in the bronze medal contest against Muki due to a broken arm, leaving him to finish fifth place.

Nakaya is currently ranked number six in the Olympic qualifiers, and is third in Japan behind Ono and Akimoto. Only one judoka per nation is able to qualify for the Olympics.

== Competitive record ==
Judo Record
Total	87
Wins	72
by Ippon	49
Losses	15
by Ippon	9

(as of 6 February 2016)
