= 2014 World Judo Championships – Men's 73 kg =

Judo competition

Judo Men's 73 kg at the 2014 World Judo Championships
- Venue: Traktor Ice Arena
- Location: Chelyabinsk, Russia
- Date: 27 August 2014
- Competitors: 68 from 54 nations
- Total prize money: 14,000$

Medalists
gold medal	Riki Nakaya (2nd title)	Japan
silver medal	Hong Kuk-hyon	North Korea
bronze medal	Victor Scvortov	United Arab Emirates
bronze medal	Musa Mogushkov	Russia

Competition at external databases
- Links: IJF • JudoInside

The men's 73 kg competition of the 2014 World Judo Championships was held on 27 August.

== Medalists ==
Gold	Silver	Bronze
Riki Nakaya (JPN)	Hong Kuk-hyon (PRK)	Victor Scvortov (UAE); Musa Mogushkov (RUS)

== Results ==
=== Finals ===
Semi-finals
(Kazakhstan) Yertugan Torenov	000
(North Korea) Hong Kuk-hyon	110
(Japan) Riki Nakaya	001
(United Arab Emirates) Victor Scvortov	000

Final
(North Korea) Hong Kuk-hyon	000
(Japan) Riki Nakaya	100

=== Repechage ===
Repechage		Third place
(South Korea) Lee Young-jun	010
(Belgium) Dirk Van Tichelt	001	(South Korea) Lee Young-jun	000
		(United Arab Emirates) Victor Scvortov	100

Repechage		Third place
(Azerbaijan) Rustam Orujov	000
(Russia) Musa Mogushkov	101	(Russia) Musa Mogushkov	010
		(Kazakhstan) Yertugan Torenov	000

=== Pool A ===
First round fights

	Score	
Mirali Sharipov (Uzbekistan)	110–000	(New Zealand) Lee Calder

First Round
(Slovenia) Rok Drakšič	110
(Ukraine) Dmytro Kanivets	000
(Yemen) Zeyad Mate	000
(Uzbekistan) Mirali Sharipov	100
(Nauru) Sled Dowabobo	000
(Kazakhstan) Yertugan Torenov	100
(Paraguay) David Amarilla	000
(Cyprus) Phedias Konnaris	100
(Japan) Shohei Ono	100
(Poland) Damian Szwarnowiecki	000
(Mongolia) Sainjargalyn Nyam-Ochir	001
(Canada) Etienne Briand	000
(American Samoa) Benjamin Waterhouse	000
(South Korea) Lee Young-jun	100
(Australia) Jake Bensted	102
(Kuwait) Eisa Al-Ali	000

Quarterfinals
(Slovenia) Rok Drakšič	100
(Uzbekistan) Mirali Sharipov	001
(Kazakhstan) Yertugan Torenov	101
(Cyprus) Phedias Konnaris	000
(Japan) Shohei Ono	000
(Mongolia) Sainjargalyn Nyam-Ochir	000
(South Korea) Lee Young-jun	011
(Australia) Jake Bensted	000

Semifinals
(Slovenia) Rok Drakšič	000
(Kazakhstan) Yertugan Torenov	100
(Japan) Shohei Ono	000
(South Korea) Lee Young-jun	100

Final
(Kazakhstan) Yertugan Torenov	002
(South Korea) Lee Young-jun	000

=== Pool B ===
First round fights

	Score	
Dirk Van Tichelt (Belgium)	001–000	(Bulgaria) Martin Ivanov

First Round
(Brazil) Alex Pombo	000
(Belgium) Dirk Van Tichelt	100
(Belarus) Aliaksei Ramanchyk	001
(Cuba) Magdiel Estrada	000
(Italy) Enrico Parlati	100
(Tajikistan) Saidmukhtor Rasulov	000
(Argentina) Alejandro Clara	000
(Czech Republic) Jaromír Ježek	001
(France) Ugo Legrand	010
(Chinese Taipei) Huang Chun-ta	000
(Portugal) André Alves	000
(North Korea) Hong Kuk-hyon	000
(Georgia (country)) Nugzar Tatalashvili	010
(Turkmenistan) Samvel Ayrapetyan	000
(Armenia) Armen Nazaryan	010
(Peru) Daniel Vizcarra	000

Quarterfinals
(Belgium) Dirk Van Tichelt	010
(Belarus) Aliaksei Ramanchyk	000
(Italy) Enrico Parlati	000
(Czech Republic) Jaromír Ježek	100
(France) Ugo Legrand	000
(North Korea) Hong Kuk-hyon	001
(Georgia (country)) Nugzar Tatalashvili	100
(Armenia) Armen Nazaryan	000

Semifinals
(Belgium) Dirk Van Tichelt	000
(Czech Republic) Jaromír Ježek	000
(North Korea) Hong Kuk-hyon	010
(Georgia (country)) Nugzar Tatalashvili	002

Final
(Belgium) Dirk Van Tichelt	000
(North Korea) Hong Kuk-hyon	100

=== Pool C ===
First round fights

	Score	
An Chang-rim (South Korea)	101–000	(Spain) Kiyoshi Uematsu
Tommy Macias (Sweden)	000–100	(Azerbaijan) Rustam Orujov

First Round
(Israel) Sagi Muki	001
(South Korea) An Chang-rim	000
(China) Sai Yinjirigala	110
(Peru) Luis Ángeles	000
(Cyprus) Neoklis Skouroumounis	000
(Dominican Republic) Lwilli Santana	100
(Netherlands) Dex Elmont	110
(Saudi Arabia) Jaber Al-Harthi	000
(Belarus) Vadzim Shoka	001
(Azerbaijan) Rustam Orujov	100
(Mozambique) Edson Madeira	101
(Ivory Coast) Jean Adingra	000
(Georgia (country)) Lasha Shavdatuashvili	000
(Ghana) Emmanuel Nartey	000

Quarterfinals
(Israel) Sagi Muki	000
(Japan) Riki Nakaya	010
(China) Sai Yinjirigala	000
(Dominican Republic) Lwilli Santana	000
(Netherlands) Dex Elmont	000
(Azerbaijan) Rustam Orujov	100
(Mozambique) Edson Madeira	000
(Georgia (country)) Lasha Shavdatuashvili	100

Semifinals
(Japan) Riki Nakaya	100
(China) Sai Yinjirigala	000
(Azerbaijan) Rustam Orujov	100
(Georgia (country)) Lasha Shavdatuashvili	010

Final
(Japan) Riki Nakaya	001
(Azerbaijan) Rustam Orujov	000

=== Pool D ===
First round fights

	Score	
Sarvar Shomurodov (Uzbekistan)	010–000	(Turkmenistan) Kasym Populov

First Round
(United Arab Emirates) Victor Scvortov	100
(Gabon) Terence Kouamba	000
(Monaco) Cedric Bessi	000
(Uzbekistan) Sarvar Shomurodov	110
(France) Pierre Duprat	100
(Estonia) Künter Rothberg	000
(United States) Nicholas Delpopolo	000
(Ukraine) Serhiy Drebot	001
(Mongolia) Khashbaataryn Tsagaanbaatar	101
(Kyrgyzstan) Ruslan Dzhanybek Uulu	000
(Germany) Christopher Völk	000
(Russia) Musa Mogushkov	011
(Canada) Alexis Morin-Martel	010
(Czech Republic) Jakub Ječmínek	000
(Portugal) Jorge Fernandes	000
(Hungary) Miklós Ungvári	100

Quarterfinals
(United Arab Emirates) Victor Scvortov	101
(Uzbekistan) Sarvar Shomurodov	000
(France) Pierre Duprat	100
(Ukraine) Serhiy Drebot	000
(Mongolia) Khashbaataryn Tsagaanbaatar	000
(Russia) Musa Mogushkov	010
(Canada) Alexis Morin-Martel	000
(Hungary) Miklós Ungvári	110

Semifinals
(United Arab Emirates) Victor Scvortov	100
(France) Pierre Duprat	000
(Russia) Musa Mogushkov	000
(Hungary) Miklós Ungvári	000

Final
(United Arab Emirates) Victor Scvortov	001
(Russia) Musa Mogushkov	000

== Prize money ==
The sums listed bring the total prizes awarded to $14,000 for the individual event.

Medal	Total	Judoka	Coach
Gold	$6,000	$4,800	$1,200
Silver	$4,000	$3,200	$800
Bronze	$2,000	$1,600	$400
