= Judo at the 2010 Asian Games – Men's 73 kg =

Judo competition

Men's 73 kg at the 2010 Asian Games
- Venue: Huagong Gymnasium
- Date: 15 November 2010
- Competitors: 22 from 22 nations

Medalists
gold medal	Hiroyuki Akimoto	Japan
silver medal	Wang Ki-chun	South Korea
bronze medal	Navruz Jurakobilov	Uzbekistan
bronze medal	Rasul Boqiev	Tajikistan

The men's 73 kilograms (lightweight) competition at the 2010 Asian Games in Guangzhou was held on 15 November at the Huagong Gymnasium.

== Schedule ==
All times are China Standard Time (UTC+08:00)

Date	Time	Event
Monday, 15 November 2010	10:00	Preliminary 1
Monday, 15 November 2010	10:00	Preliminary 2
Monday, 15 November 2010	10:00	Quarterfinals
Monday, 15 November 2010	15:00	Final of repechage
Monday, 15 November 2010	15:00	Final of table
Monday, 15 November 2010	15:00	Finals

== Results ==
Legend

- WO — Won by walkover

=== Main bracket ===
==== Final ====
Gold medal
Wang Ki-chun (KOR)	000
Hiroyuki Akimoto (JPN)	001

==== Top half ====
Preliminary 1
Ganbaataryn Odbayar (MGL)	100
Odai Al-Mawarde (SYR)	000
Ramashrey Yadav (IND)	020
Mohammad Mohammad (IOC)	000
Kim Chol-su (PRK)	001
Achilleus Ralli (THA)	000

Preliminary 2
Wang Ki-chun (KOR)	010
Ganbaataryn Odbayar (MGL)	001
Ramashrey Yadav (IND)	100
Yassir Ayad (KSA)	000
Rinat Ibragimov (KAZ)	011
Guwanç Nurmuhammedow (TKM)	100
Kim Chol-su (PRK)	WO
Zeyad Mater (YEM)

Quarterfinals
Wang Ki-chun (KOR)	111
Ramashrey Yadav (IND)	000
Guwanç Nurmuhammedow (TKM)	000
Kim Chol-su (PRK)	100

Final of table
Wang Ki-chun (KOR)	100
Kim Chol-su (PRK)	000

==== Bottom half ====
Preliminary 1
Khalifa Al-Qubaisi (UAE)	002
Cheung Chi Yip (HKG)	000
Trần Thương (VIE)	101
Deepak Krishna Shrestha (NEP)	000
Ali Maloumat (IRI)	100
Jin Zhiwei (CHN)	001

Preliminary 2
Hiroyuki Akimoto (JPN)	100
Khalifa Al-Qubaisi (UAE)	000
Azat Kubakaev (KGZ)	110
Trần Thương (VIE)	000
Navruz Jurakobilov (UZB)	WO
Ahmed Abdul-Adhim (IRQ)
Rasul Boqiev (TJK)	002
Ali Maloumat (IRI)	000

Quarterfinals
Hiroyuki Akimoto (JPN)	020
Azat Kubakaev (KGZ)	000
Navruz Jurakobilov (UZB)	000
Rasul Boqiev (TJK)	000

Final of table
Hiroyuki Akimoto (JPN)	101
Navruz Jurakobilov (UZB)	000

=== Repechage ===
Final of repechage
Ramashrey Yadav (IND)	001
Guwanç Nurmuhammedow (TKM)	100
Azat Kubakaev (KGZ)	001
Rasul Boqiev (TJK)	002

Bronze medals
Guwanç Nurmuhammedow (TKM)	000
Navruz Jurakobilov (UZB)	101
Rasul Boqiev (TJK)	001
Kim Chol-su (PRK)	000
