= Judo at the 2006 Asian Games – Men's 73 kg =

Judo competition

Men's 73 kg at the 2006 Asian Games
- Venue: Qatar SC Indoor Hall
- Date: 4 December 2006
- Competitors: 22 from 22 nations

Medalists
gold medal	Lee Won-hee	South Korea
silver medal	Masahiro Takamatsu	Japan
bronze medal	Shokir Muminov	Uzbekistan
bronze medal	Rasul Boqiev	Tajikistan

The men's 73 kilograms (Lightweight) competition at the 2006 Asian Games in Doha was held on 4 December at the Qatar SC Indoor Hall.

== Schedule ==
All times are Arabia Standard Time (UTC+03:00)

Date	Time	Event
Monday, 4 December 2006	14:00	Round of 32
Monday, 4 December 2006	14:00	Round of 16
Monday, 4 December 2006	14:00	Quarterfinals
Monday, 4 December 2006	14:00	Repechage −2R
Monday, 4 December 2006	14:00	Repechage −1R
Monday, 4 December 2006	14:00	Repechage final
Monday, 4 December 2006	14:00	Semifinals
Monday, 4 December 2006	14:00	Finals

== Results ==
Legend

- WO — Won by walkover

=== Main bracket ===
==== Final ====
Gold medal contest
Masahiro Takamatsu (JPN)	0000
Lee Won-hee (KOR)	1000

==== Top half ====
Round of 32
Aidar Kabimollayev (KAZ)	1000
Sami Al-Bachir (QAT)	0000
Karamat Butt (PAK)	0001
Susantha Kumara (SRI)	0002
Naif Ammar (KSA)	0000
Cheung Chi Yip (HKG)	0020

Round of 16
Maher Abu Rmeileh (PLE)	0000
Aidar Kabimollayev (KAZ)	1000
Masahiro Takamatsu (JPN)	1000
Susantha Kumara (SRI)	0000
Joe Tony Nasr (LIB)	1000
Gilbert Ramirez (PHI)	0001
Kim Chol-su (PRK)	1000
Cheung Chi Yip (HKG)	0000

Quarterfinals
Aidar Kabimollayev (KAZ)	0000
Masahiro Takamatsu (JPN)	0010
Joe Tony Nasr (LIB)	0000
Kim Chol-su (PRK)	1000

Semifinals
Masahiro Takamatsu (JPN)	0210
Kim Chol-su (PRK)	0101

==== Bottom half ====
Round of 32
Shokir Muminov (UZB)	1001
Zakaria Moradi (IRI)	0001
Sainjargalyn Nyam-Ochir (MGL)	0001
Muhammedaly Karaýew (TKM)	0000
Lee Won-hee (KOR)	1111
Khalifa Al-Qubaisi (UAE)	0000

Round of 16
Shokir Muminov (UZB)	0210
Alexander Ralli (THA)	0000
Sainjargalyn Nyam-Ochir (MGL)	0000
Shi Rongrong (CHN)	1101
Mazen Naanaee (SYR)	WO
Islam Baialinov (KGZ)
Lee Won-hee (KOR)	0001
Rasul Boqiev (TJK)	0000

Quarterfinals
Shokir Muminov (UZB)	1000
Shi Rongrong (CHN)	0000
Mazen Naanaee (SYR)	0001
Lee Won-hee (KOR)	1000

Semifinals
Shokir Muminov (UZB)	0000
Lee Won-hee (KOR)	1000

=== Repechage ===
Repechage −2R
Zakaria Moradi (IRI)	1000
Alexander Ralli (THA)	0000
Khalifa Al-Qubaisi (UAE)	0000
Rasul Boqiev (TJK)	1101

Repechage −1R
Susantha Kumara (SRI)	0000
Aidar Kabimollayev (KAZ)	1000
Cheung Chi Yip (HKG)	1000
Joe Tony Nasr (LIB)	0100
Zakaria Moradi (IRI)	1031
Shi Rongrong (CHN)	0010
Rasul Boqiev (TJK)	1000
Mazen Naanaee (SYR)	0000

Repechage final
Aidar Kabimollayev (KAZ)	1000
Cheung Chi Yip (HKG)	0100
Zakaria Moradi (IRI)	0000
Rasul Boqiev (TJK)	0010

Bronze medal contest
Aidar Kabimollayev (KAZ)	0001
Shokir Muminov (UZB)	1001
Rasul Boqiev (TJK)	0100
Kim Chol-su (PRK)	0000
