= Judo at the 2014 Asian Games – Men's 73 kg =

Judo competition

Men's 73 kg at the 2014 Asian Games
- Venue: Dowon Gymnasium
- Date: 21 September 2014
- Competitors: 21 from 21 nations

Medalists
| gold medal | Hiroyuki Akimoto | Japan |
| silver medal | Ganbaataryn Odbayar | Mongolia |
| bronze medal | Hong Kuk-hyon | North Korea |
| bronze medal | Bang Gui-man | South Korea |

The men's 73 kilograms (Lightweight) competition at the 2014 Asian Games in Incheon was held on 21 September at the Dowon Gymnasium.

== Schedule ==
All times are Korea Standard Time (UTC+09:00)

| Date | Time | Event |
|---|---|---|
| Sunday, 21 September 2014 | 14:00 | Elimination round of 32 |
| Sunday, 21 September 2014 | 14:00 | Elimination round of 16 |
| Sunday, 21 September 2014 | 14:00 | Quarterfinals |
| Sunday, 21 September 2014 | 14:00 | Semifinals |
| Sunday, 21 September 2014 | 14:00 | Final of repechage |
| Sunday, 21 September 2014 | 19:00 | Finals |

== Results ==
=== Main bracket ===
==== Final ====
| Gold medal contest |
| Ganbaataryn Odbayar (MGL) | 000 |
| Hiroyuki Akimoto (JPN) | 001 |

==== Top half ====
Elimination round of 32
Jaber Al-Harthi (KSA) | 000
Zeyad Mater (YEM) | 110
Cheung Chi Yip (HKG) | 000
Liu Wei (CHN) | 100
Saidmukhtor Rasulov (TJK) | 100
Palitha Phrommala (LAO) | 000

Elimination round of 16
Bye
Zeyad Mater (YEM)
Navruz Jurakobilov (UZB) | 100
Liu Wei (CHN) | 000
Ganbaataryn Odbayar (MGL) | 000
Saidmukhtor Rasulov (TJK) | 000
Dastan Ykybayev (KAZ) | 110
Gilbert Ramirez (PHI) | 000

Quarterfinals
Zeyad Mater (YEM) | 000
Navruz Jurakobilov (UZB) | 100
Ganbaataryn Odbayar (MGL) | 100
Dastan Ykybayev (KAZ) | 000

Semifinals
Navruz Jurakobilov (UZB) | 000
Ganbaataryn Odbayar (MGL) | 010

==== Bottom half ====
Elimination round of 32
Saeid Mollaei (IRI) | 100
Eisa Al-Ali (KUW) | 000
Masayuki Terada (THA) | 000
Samwel Aýrapetýan (TKM) | 111
Iksan Apriyadi (INA) | 110
Nasser Al-Ansi (QAT) | 000

Elimination round of 16
Bang Gui-man (KOR) | 110
Shahwali Mohsin (AFG) | 000
Hiroyuki Akimoto (JPN) | 100
Saeid Mollaei (IRI) | 000
Hong Kuk-hyon (PRK) | 011
Samwel Aýrapetýan (TKM) | 001
Huang Chun-ta (TPE) | 100
Iksan Apriyadi (INA) | 000

Quarterfinals
Bang Gui-man (KOR) | 000
Hiroyuki Akimoto (JPN) | 000
Hong Kuk-hyon (PRK) | 110
Huang Chun-ta (TPE) | 000

Semifinals
Hiroyuki Akimoto (JPN) | 000
Hong Kuk-hyon (PRK) | 000

=== Repechage ===
Final of repechage
Zeyad Mater (YEM) | 000
Dastan Ykybayev (KAZ) | 100
Bang Gui-man (KOR) | 013
Huang Chun-ta (TPE) | 000

Bronze medal contests
Dastan Ykybayev (KAZ) | 000
Hong Kuk-hyon (PRK) | 002
Bang Gui-man (KOR) | 100
Navruz Jurakobilov (UZB) | 000
