= Katabuchi =

Katabuchi or Katafuchi (written: 片渕) is a Japanese surname. Notable people with the surname include:

- Koichiro Katafuchi (片渕 浩一郎, born 1975), Japanese footballer and manager
- Shinya Katabuchi (片渕 慎弥, born 1983), Japanese judoka
- Sunao Katabuchi (片渕 須直, born 1960), Japanese anime director
