= Judo at the 2010 Asian Games – Men's 66 kg =

Judo competition

Men's 66 kg at the 2010 Asian Games
- Venue: Huagong Gymnasium
- Date: 15 November 2010
- Competitors: 22 from 22 nations

Medalists
gold medal	Kim Joo-jin	South Korea
silver medal	Mirzohid Farmonov	Uzbekistan
bronze medal	Junpei Morishita	Japan
bronze medal	Hong Kuk-hyon	North Korea

The men's 66 kilograms (half lightweight) competition at the 2010 Asian Games in Guangzhou was held on 15 November at the Huagong Gymnasium.

== Schedule ==
All times are China Standard Time (UTC+08:00)

Date	Time	Event
Monday, 15 November 2010	10:00	Preliminary 1
Monday, 15 November 2010	10:00	Preliminary 2
Monday, 15 November 2010	10:00	Quarterfinals
Monday, 15 November 2010	15:00	Final of repechage
Monday, 15 November 2010	15:00	Final of table
Monday, 15 November 2010	15:00	Finals

== Results ==
Legend

- WO — Won by walkover

=== Main bracket ===
==== Final ====
Gold medal
Mirzohid Farmonov (UZB)	000
Kim Joo-jin (KOR)	001

==== Top half ====
Preliminary 1
Shukhrad Farkhizoda (TJK)	021
Rahmat Shah Mushkel (AFG)	000
Sanju Singh Irom (IND)	000
Tarek Saad (SYR)	010
Dastan Ykybayev (KAZ)	100
Amornthep Namwiset (THA)	000

Preliminary 2
Khashbaataryn Tsagaanbaatar (MGL)	012
Shukhrad Farkhizoda (TJK)	000
Islam Baialinov (KGZ)	100
Tarek Saad (SYR)	000
Dastan Ykybayev (KAZ)	110
Hồ Ngân Giang (VIE)	000
Mirzohid Farmonov (UZB)	100
Aiat Ullah (PAK)	000

Quarterfinals
Khashbaataryn Tsagaanbaatar (MGL)	000
Islam Baialinov (KGZ)	100
Dastan Ykybayev (KAZ)	000
Mirzohid Farmonov (UZB)	100

Final of table
Islam Baialinov (KGZ)	000
Mirzohid Farmonov (UZB)	100

==== Bottom half ====
Preliminary 1
Arash Miresmaeili (IRI)	101
Eisa Al-Ali (IOC)	000
Humaid Al-Derei (UAE)
Yang Xiaoming (CHN)	WO
Hong Kuk-hyon (PRK)	101
Waleed Al-Kabzari (YEM)	002

Preliminary 2
Kim Joo-jin (KOR)	111
Ali Meneiawi (KSA)	000
Arash Miresmaeili (IRI)	100
Yang Xiaoming (CHN)	000
Junpei Morishita (JPN)	100
Palitha Phrommala (LAO)	000
Hong Kuk-hyon (PRK)	100
Arslan Nurmuhammedow (TKM)	000

Quarterfinals
Kim Joo-jin (KOR)	100
Arash Miresmaeili (IRI)	000
Junpei Morishita (JPN)	101
Hong Kuk-hyon (PRK)	000

Final of table
Kim Joo-jin (KOR)	100
Junpei Morishita (JPN)	000

=== Repechage ===
Final of repechage
Bye
Dastan Ykybayev (KAZ)
Arash Miresmaeili (IRI)	001
Hong Kuk-hyon (PRK)	020

Bronze medals
Dastan Ykybayev (KAZ)	000
Junpei Morishita (JPN)	100
Hong Kuk-hyon (PRK)	001
Islam Baialinov (KGZ)	000
