= Jaromír Ježek =

Czech judoka (born 1986)

Personal information
- Born: 13 November 1986 (age 39)
- Occupation: Junior national coach
- Employer: Judo Austria

Sport
- Country: Czech Republic
- Sport: Judo
- Weight class: ‍–‍73 kg, ‍–‍81 kg

Achievements and titles
- Olympic Games: R16 (2012)
- World Champ.: R16 (2014, 2015)
- European Champ.: (bronze) (2011)
Medal record
Men's judo
Representing Czech Republic
European Championships
Bronze medal – third place	2011 Istanbul	‍–‍73 kg
IJF Grand Prix
Silver medal – second place	2016 Almaty	‍–‍73 kg
Bronze medal – third place	2011 Baku	‍–‍73 kg
Bronze medal – third place	2013 Samsun	‍–‍81 kg
European U23 Championships
Bronze medal – third place	2008 Zagreb	‍–‍73 kg
European Junior Championships
Bronze medal – third place	2005 Zagreb	‍–‍73 kg
Summer Universiade
Bronze medal – third place	2009 Belgrade	‍–‍81 kg

Profile at external databases
- IJF: 621
- JudoInside.com: 22446
- Updated on 14 November 2022

Jaromír Ježek (Czech pronunciation: [ˈjaromiːr ˈjɛʒɛk]; born 13 November 1986, Hradec Králové) is a Czech judoka. He has competed at the 2008 and 2012 Summer Olympics. At the 2008 Summer Olympics, he lost in the first round to Shokir Muminov. He went one round better at the 2012 Summer Olympics, where he beat Aleni Smith in his first match, before losing to Wang Ki-Chun in the next.

From 1 November 2023 Ježek works as junior national coach for the Austrian Judo Federation.

== Achievements ==
Year	Tournament	Place	Weight class
2011	European Championships	3rd	Lightweight (–73 kg)
2008	European Championships	5th	Lightweight (–73 kg)
