= Judo at the 2006 Asian Games – Men's 66 kg =

Judo competition

Men's 66 kg at the 2006 Asian Games
- Venue: Qatar SC Indoor Hall
- Date: 4 December 2006
- Competitors: 27 from 27 nations

Medalists
gold medal	Khashbaataryn Tsagaanbaatar	Mongolia
silver medal	Arash Miresmaeili	Iran
bronze medal	Kim Kwang-sub	South Korea
bronze medal	Hiroyuki Akimoto	Japan

The men's 66 kilograms (Half lightweight) competition at the 2006 Asian Games in Doha was held on 4 December at the Qatar SC Indoor Hall.

== Schedule ==
All times are Arabia Standard Time (UTC+03:00)

Date	Time	Event
Monday, 4 December 2006	14:00	Round of 32
Monday, 4 December 2006	14:00	Round of 16
Monday, 4 December 2006	14:00	Quarterfinals
Monday, 4 December 2006	14:00	Repechage −2R
Monday, 4 December 2006	14:00	Repechage −1R
Monday, 4 December 2006	14:00	Repechage final
Monday, 4 December 2006	14:00	Semifinals
Monday, 4 December 2006	14:00	Finals

== Results ==
=== Main bracket ===
==== Final ====
Gold medal contest
Arash Miresmaeili (IRI)	0000
Khashbaataryn Tsagaanbaatar (MGL)	0100

==== Top half ====
Round of 32
Guwanç Nurmuhammedow (TKM)	1000
Sok Dara (CAM)	0000
Kim Kwang-sub (KOR)	0010
Soroush Khalili (QAT)	0000
Habibur Rahman (BAN)	0000
Rustam Boqiev (TJK)	1000
Alisher Mantobetov (KGZ)	0110
Abdulrahman Al-Hazmi (KSA)	1000
Aquino da Silva (MAC)	0000
Peter Taslim (INA)	1000

Round of 16
Waleed Al-Kabzari (YEM)	0000
Guwanç Nurmuhammedow (TKM)	1000
Kim Kwang-sub (KOR)	0001
Rustam Boqiev (TJK)	0000
Abdulrahman Al-Hazmi (KSA)	1011
Sayed Hussain Hussaini (AFG)	0001
Arash Miresmaeili (IRI)	1000
Peter Taslim (INA)	0000

Quarterfinals
Guwanç Nurmuhammedow (TKM)	1000
Kim Kwang-sub (KOR)	0001
Abdulrahman Al-Hazmi (KSA)	0000
Arash Miresmaeili (IRI)	1000

Semifinals
Guwanç Nurmuhammedow (TKM)	0000
Arash Miresmaeili (IRI)	1020

==== Bottom half ====
Round of 32
Viengvilay Chansy (LAO)	0000
Sayat Almukashev (KAZ)	1010
Mahdi Al-Qubaisi (UAE)	0000
Pak Chol-min (PRK)	1001
Nguyễn Quốc Hùng (VIE)	0000
Bu Hechaolu (CHN)	1000
Basel Jabir (PLE)	0000
Mansour Al-Shaleh (SYR)	1011
Hiroyuki Akimoto (JPN)	1011
Sanjar Zokirov (UZB)	0001
Bodin Panjabutra (THA)	1100
Chui Yiu Leung (HKG)	0010

Round of 16
Sayat Almukashev (KAZ)	0000
Pak Chol-min (PRK)	0010
Parvinder Singh (IND)	0000
Bu Hechaolu (CHN)	1010
Mansour Al-Shaleh (SYR)	0000
Hiroyuki Akimoto (JPN)	1000
Khashbaataryn Tsagaanbaatar (MGL)	1000
Bodin Panjabutra (THA)	0000

Quarterfinals
Pak Chol-min (PRK)	0000
Bu Hechaolu (CHN)	0010
Hiroyuki Akimoto (JPN)	0000
Khashbaataryn Tsagaanbaatar (MGL)	0001

Semifinals
Bu Hechaolu (CHN)	0000
Khashbaataryn Tsagaanbaatar (MGL)	1001

=== Repechage ===
Repechage −2R
Sok Dara (CAM)	0000
Waleed Al-Kabzari (YEM)	1010
Nguyễn Quốc Hùng (VIE)	0001
Parvinder Singh (IND)	1002

Repechage −1R
Waleed Al-Kabzari (YEM)	0000
Kim Kwang-sub (KOR)	1000
Peter Taslim (INA)	0010
Abdulrahman Al-Hazmi (KSA)	1000
Parvinder Singh (IND)	0000
Pak Chol-min (PRK)	0010
Bodin Panjabutra (THA)	0000
Hiroyuki Akimoto (JPN)	1000

Repechage final
Kim Kwang-sub (KOR)	0210
Abdulrahman Al-Hazmi (KSA)	0001
Pak Chol-min (PRK)	0000
Hiroyuki Akimoto (JPN)	1000

Bronze medal contest
Kim Kwang-sub (KOR)	0020
Bu Hechaolu (CHN)	0001
Hiroyuki Akimoto (JPN)	1001
Guwanç Nurmuhammedow (TKM)	0001
