= 2002 World Judo Juniors Championships =

Judo competition

Judo 2002 World Judo Juniors Championships
- Location: Jeju Island, South Korea
- Dates: 12–15 September 2002

Competition at external databases
- Links: JudoInside

The 2002 World Judo Juniors Championships was an edition of the World Judo Juniors Championships, organised by the International Judo Federation. It was held in Jeju Island, South Korea, from 12 to 15 September 2002.

== Medal summary ==
=== Men's events ===
Event	Gold	Silver	Bronze
Extra-lightweight (−60 kg)	Sanjar Zokirov (UZB)	Aset Tusupov (KAZ)	Daisuke Asano (JPN)
Extra-lightweight (−60 kg)	Sanjar Zokirov (UZB)	Aset Tusupov (KAZ)	Mohsen Zakaria (IRI)
Half-lightweight (−66 kg)	Dzianis Kuntsevich (BLR)	Park Chang-hyun (KOR)	Navruz Jurakobilov (UZB)
Half-lightweight (−66 kg)	Dzianis Kuntsevich (BLR)	Park Chang-hyun (KOR)	Ion Busanu (ROU)
Lightweight (−73 kg)	Leandro Guilheiro (BRA)	Sašo Jereb (SLO)	Tomás Muzik (CZE)
Lightweight (−73 kg)	Leandro Guilheiro (BRA)	Sašo Jereb (SLO)	Satoru Ebinuma (JPN)
Half-middleweight (−81 kg)	Leonardo Eduardo (BRA)	Roman Hontyuk (UKR)	Maxim Rakov (KAZ)
Half-middleweight (−81 kg)	Leonardo Eduardo (BRA)	Roman Hontyuk (UKR)	Jorge Benavente (ESP)
Middleweight (−90 kg)	Toshihiro Takezawa (JPN)	Gergö Rajcsányi (HUN)	Marius Bucsa (ROU)
Middleweight (−90 kg)	Toshihiro Takezawa (JPN)	Gergö Rajcsányi (HUN)	Park Sun-woo (KOR)
Half-heavyweight (−100 kg)	Takamasa Anai (JPN)	Mike Nieuwenhuijs (NED)	Cho Sung-hwa (KOR)
Half-heavyweight (−100 kg)	Takamasa Anai (JPN)	Mike Nieuwenhuijs (NED)	Abdubassir Adalov (RUS)
Heavyweight (+100 kg)	Choi Young-hwan (KOR)	Mohammad Reza Roudaki (IRI)	Alexander Moonen (NED)
Heavyweight (+100 kg)	Choi Young-hwan (KOR)	Mohammad Reza Roudaki (IRI)	Shinya Katabuchi (JPN)

=== Women's events ===
Event	Gold	Silver	Bronze
Extra-lightweight (−48 kg)	Carmen Bogdan (ROU)	Leen Dom (BEL)	Anna Kharitonova (RUS)
Extra-lightweight (−48 kg)	Carmen Bogdan (ROU)	Leen Dom (BEL)	Taciana Cesar (BRA)
Half-lightweight (−52 kg)	Aiko Sato (JPN)	Guizhong Han (CHN)	Beáta Ónody (HUN)
Half-lightweight (−52 kg)	Aiko Sato (JPN)	Guizhong Han (CHN)	Kim Kyung-ok (KOR)
Lightweight (−57 kg)	Brigitta Szabó (HUN)	Ikuko Machida (JPN)	Aki Shinomiya (SUI)
Lightweight (−57 kg)	Brigitta Szabó (HUN)	Ikuko Machida (JPN)	Yang Hsien-tzu (TPE)
Half-middleweight (−63 kg)	Yoshie Ueno (JPN)	Wang Chin-fang (TPE)	Yoo Mee-won (KOR)
Half-middleweight (−63 kg)	Yoshie Ueno (JPN)	Wang Chin-fang (TPE)	Tan Fafang (CHN)
Middleweight (−70 kg)	Asuka Oka (JPN)	Maryna Pryshchepa (UKR)	Yousra Zribi (TUN)
Middleweight (−70 kg)	Asuka Oka (JPN)	Maryna Pryshchepa (UKR)	Mylène Chollet (FRA)
Half-heavyweight (−78 kg)	Mayumi Toriyabe (JPN)	Gabi Teichmann (GER)	Lindsay Sorrell (GBR)
Half-heavyweight (−78 kg)	Mayumi Toriyabe (JPN)	Gabi Teichmann (GER)	Claudirene César (BRA)
Heavyweight (+78 kg)	Ahlem Azzabi (TUN)	Yuliya Barysik (BLR)	Rebecca Ramanich (FRA)
Heavyweight (+78 kg)	Ahlem Azzabi (TUN)	Yuliya Barysik (BLR)	Belkıs Zehra Kaya (TUR)

Source Results

=== Medal table ===
* Host nation (South Korea)

Rank	Nation	Gold	Silver	Bronze	Total
1	Japan (JPN)	6	1	3	10
2	Brazil (BRA)	2	0	2	4
3	South Korea (KOR)*	1	1	4	6
4	Hungary (HUN)	1	1	1	3
5	Belarus (BLR)	1	1	0	2
6	Romania (ROU)	1	0	2	3
7	Tunisia (TUN)	1	0	1	2
7	Uzbekistan (UZB)	1	0	1	2
9	Ukraine (UKR)	0	2	0	2
10	China (CHN)	0	1	1	2
10	Chinese Taipei (TPE)	0	1	1	2
10	Iran (IRI)	0	1	1	2
10	Kazakhstan (KAZ)	0	1	1	2
10	Netherlands (NED)	0	1	1	2
15	Belgium (BEL)	0	1	0	1
15	Germany (GER)	0	1	0	1
15	Slovenia (SLO)	0	1	0	1
18	France (FRA)	0	0	2	2
18	Russia (RUS)	0	0	2	2
20	Czech Republic (CZE)	0	0	1	1
20	Great Britain (GBR)	0	0	1	1
20	Spain (ESP)	0	0	1	1
20	Switzerland (SUI)	0	0	1	1
20	Turkey (TUR)	0	0	1	1
Totals (24 entries)		14	14	28	56
