= Kim Joo-jin =

South Korean judoka (born 1986)

Personal information
- Born: 21 June 1986 (age 40)
- Occupation: Judoka

Sport
- Country: South Korea
- Sport: Judo
- Weight class: ‍–‍66 kg, ‍–‍73 kg

Achievements and titles
- Olympic Games: R32 (2008)
- World Champ.: R16 (2010)
- Asian Champ.: (gold) (2010)
Medal record
Men's judo
Representing South Korea
Asian Games
Gold medal – first place	2010 Guangzhou	‍–‍66 kg
Asian Championships
Bronze medal – third place	2008 Jeju	‍–‍66 kg
IJF Grand Slam
Gold medal – first place	2010 Paris	‍–‍66 kg
Silver medal – second place	2009 Tokyo	‍–‍66 kg
Silver medal – second place	2010 Moscow	‍–‍66 kg
IJF Grand Prix
Gold medal – first place	2009 Hamburg	‍–‍66 kg
Bronze medal – third place	2013 Ulaanbaatar	‍–‍73 kg
Asian Junior Championships
Gold medal – first place	2004 Doha	‍–‍66 kg
Gold medal – first place	2005 Beirut	‍–‍66 kg

Profile at external databases
- IJF: 1976
- JudoInside.com: 34336
- Updated on 28 November 2022

Kim Joo-jin (or Kim Ju-jin, Korean: 김주진, born 21 June 1986) is a male judoka from South Korea.

On 9 February 2008, he won the gold medal in the ‍–‍66 kg at the Super World Cup (Tournoi de Paris), beating 2004 Olympic champion Masato Uchishiba by ippon in the final. Kim also won a bronze medal in the ‍–‍66 kg at the 2008 Asian Judo Championships in Jeju, South Korea. He competed in the half-lightweight division at the 2008 Summer Olympics.
