= Walter Santos =

Brazilian judoka (born 1982)

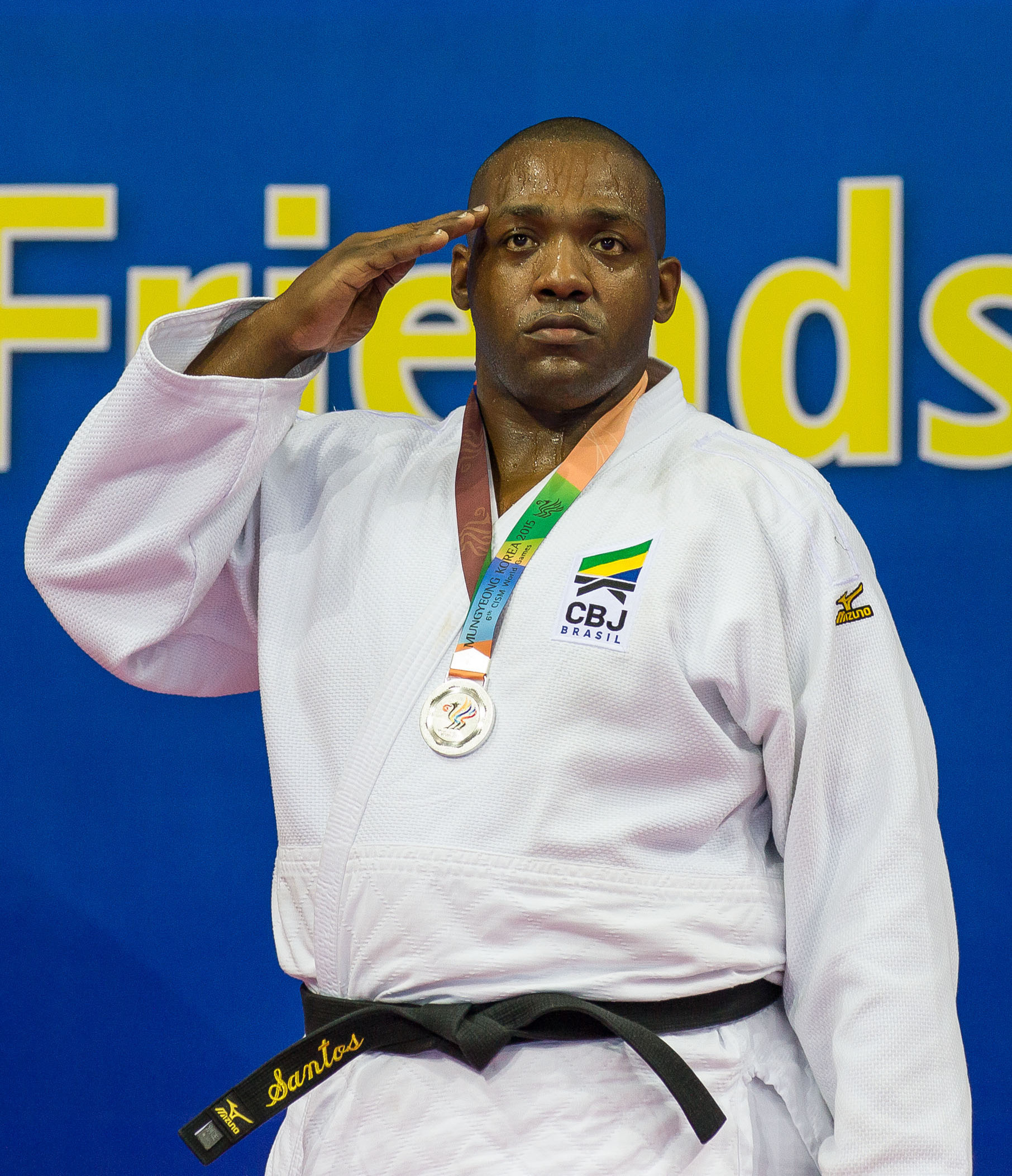
- Santos at the 2015 Military World Games

Personal information
- Born: 1 January 1982 (age 44)
- Occupation: Judoka

Sport
- Country: Brazil
- Sport: Judo
- Weight class: +100 kg

Achievements and titles
- World Champ.: 9th (2005)
- Pan American Champ.: (2005, 2005, 2008)
Medal record
Men's judo
Representing Brazil
Pan American Championships
Gold medal – first place	2005 Caguas	Open
Gold medal – first place	2005 Caguas	+100 kg
Gold medal – first place	2008 Miami	+100 kg
Silver medal – second place	2008 Miami	Open
IJF Grand Slam
Gold medal – first place	2013 Baku	+100 kg
Silver medal – second place	2012 Rio de Janeiro	+100 kg
IJF Grand Prix
Bronze medal – third place	2013 Miami	+100 kg
Military World Games
Gold medal – first place	2015 Mungyeong	+90 kg
Gold medal – first place	2015 Mungyeong	Team
Silver medal – second place	2013 Astana	+100 kg
Silver medal – second place	2015 Mungyeong	+100 kg

Profile at external databases
- IJF: 2077
- JudoInside.com: 29949
- Updated on 27 November 2022

Walter Santos (born 1 January 1982) is a heavyweight judoka from Brazil. He won three gold and one silver medals at the Pan American Championships in 2005 and 2008.
