= Judo at the 2003 Summer Universiade =

Judo competition

Judo Judo at the 2003 Summer Universiade
- Location: Daegu, South Korea
- Dates: 25–30 August 2003

Medalists
gold medal	Japan (4th title)
silver medal	France
bronze medal	South Korea

Champions
- Men's team: South Korea (3rd title)
- Women's team: Japan (1st title)

Competition at external databases
- Links: JudoInside

The Judo competition at the 2003 Summer Universiade were held in Daegu, South Korea from 25 to 30 August 2003.

== Medal overview ==
=== Men's event ===
Event	Gold	Silver	Bronze
Extra-lightweight (60 kg)	Takeshi Ogawa (JPN)	Jérémy Le Bris (FRA)	Cho Nam-Suk (KOR)
Extra-lightweight (60 kg)	Takeshi Ogawa (JPN)	Jérémy Le Bris (FRA)	Khashbaataryn Tsagaanbaatar (MGL)
Half-lightweight (66 kg)	Takashi Terai (JPN)	Yordanis Arencibia (CUB)	Jozef Krnáč (SVK)
Half-lightweight (66 kg)	Takashi Terai (JPN)	Yordanis Arencibia (CUB)	Gábor Neu (HUN)
Lightweight (73 kg)	Lee Won-Hee (KOR)	Masahiro Takamatsu (JPN)	Miguel Romero (ESP)
Lightweight (73 kg)	Lee Won-Hee (KOR)	Masahiro Takamatsu (JPN)	Varuzhan Israyelyan (ARM)
Half-middleweight (81 kg)	Kwon Young-Woo (KOR)	Óscar Fernández (ESP)	Ole Bischof (GER)
Half-middleweight (81 kg)	Kwon Young-Woo (KOR)	Óscar Fernández (ESP)	Denis Ogienko (RUS)
Middleweight (90 kg)	Hiroshi Izumi (JPN)	Diego Barreto (BRA)	Gergö Rajcsányi (HUN)
Middleweight (90 kg)	Hiroshi Izumi (JPN)	Diego Barreto (BRA)	Park Sun-woo (KOR)
Half-heavyweight (100 kg)	György Kosztolánczy (HUN)	Gianluca Giaccaglia (ITA)	Amel Mekić (BIH)
Half-heavyweight (100 kg)	György Kosztolánczy (HUN)	Gianluca Giaccaglia (ITA)	Luciano Corrêa (BRA)
Heavyweight (+100 kg)	Abdullo Tangriev (UZB)	Frédéric LeCanu (FRA)	Obren Božović (SCG)
Heavyweight (+100 kg)	Abdullo Tangriev (UZB)	Frédéric LeCanu (FRA)	Kim Sung-Bum (KOR)
Openweight	Abdullo Tangriev (UZB)	Frédéric Paupert (FRA)	Luciano Corrêa (BRA)
Openweight	Abdullo Tangriev (UZB)	Frédéric Paupert (FRA)	Shinya Katabuchi (JPN)
Team	South Korea	Japan	Hungary
Team	South Korea	Japan	Ukraine

=== Women's event ===
Event	Gold	Silver	Bronze
Extra-lightweight (48 kg)	Mayumi Takara (JPN)	Pak Myong-Hui (PRK)	Francesca Congia (ITA)
Extra-lightweight (48 kg)	Mayumi Takara (JPN)	Pak Myong-Hui (PRK)	Choi Ok-Ja (KOR)
Half-lightweight (52 kg)	Audrey La Rizza (FRA)	An Kum-ae (PRK)	Hisae Takara (JPN)
Half-lightweight (52 kg)	Audrey La Rizza (FRA)	An Kum-ae (PRK)	Ren Minjing (CHN)
Lightweight (57 kg)	Hong Ok-Song (PRK)	Fanny Euranie (FRA)	Yurisleidis Lupetey (CUB)
Lightweight (57 kg)	Hong Ok-Song (PRK)	Fanny Euranie (FRA)	Yang Mi-Yung (KOR)
Half-middleweight (63 kg)	Marie Pasquet (FRA)	Ji Gyong-Sun (PRK)	Africa Gutiérrez (ESP)
Half-middleweight (63 kg)	Marie Pasquet (FRA)	Ji Gyong-Sun (PRK)	Hidemi Soda (JPN)
Middleweight (70 kg)	Gévrise Émane (FRA)	Cathérine Roberge (CAN)	Leire Iglesias (ESP)
Middleweight (70 kg)	Gévrise Émane (FRA)	Cathérine Roberge (CAN)	Bae Eun-Hye (KOR)
Half-heavyweight (78 kg)	Cho Soo-Hee (KOR)	Pan Yuqing (CHN)	Stéphanie Possamaï (FRA)
Half-heavyweight (78 kg)	Cho Soo-Hee (KOR)	Pan Yuqing (CHN)	Megumi Nagase (JPN)
Heavyweight (+78 kg)	Liu Xia (CHN)	Kei Eguchi (JPN)	Jessica van der Spil (NED)
Heavyweight (+78 kg)	Liu Xia (CHN)	Kei Eguchi (JPN)	Elena Shleyzye (RUS)
Openweight	Xue Fuyan (CHN)	Mika Sugimoto (JPN)	Lee Hsiao-hung (TPE)
Openweight	Xue Fuyan (CHN)	Mika Sugimoto (JPN)	Mariya Semenyuk (UKR)
Team	Japan	China	France
Team	Japan	China	South Korea

=== Medals table ===
Rank	Nation	Gold	Silver	Bronze	Total
1	Japan	4	3	4	11
2	France	3	4	1	8
3	South Korea	3	0	6	9
4	China	2	1	1	4
5	Uzbekistan	2	0	0	2
6	North Korea	1	3	0	4
7	Hungary	1	0	2	3
8	Spain	0	1	3	4
9	Brazil	0	1	2	3
10	Cuba	0	1	1	2
10	Italy	0	1	1	2
12	Canada	0	1	0	1
13	Russia	0	0	2	2
14	Armenia	0	0	1	1
14	Bosnia and Herzegovina	0	0	1	1
14	Chinese Taipei	0	0	1	1
14	Germany	0	0	1	1
14	Mongolia	0	0	1	1
14	Netherlands	0	0	1	1
14	Serbia and Montenegro	0	0	1	1
14	Slovakia	0	0	1	1
14	Ukraine	0	0	1	1
Totals (22 entries)		16	16	32	64
