= 2013 Judo Grand Slam Baku =

Judo competition

Judo 2013 Judo Grand Slam Baku
- Location: Baku, Azerbaijan
- Dates: 4–5 May 2013
- Competitors: 209 from 27 nations

Competition at external databases
- Links: IJF • JudoInside

The 2013 Judo Grand Slam Baku was held in Baku, Azerbaijan, from 4 to 5 May 2013.

== Medal summary ==
=== Men's events ===
Event	Gold	Silver	Bronze
Extra-lightweight (−60 kg)	Dashdavaagiin Amartüvshin (MGL)	Askhat Telmanov (KAZ)	Robert Mshvidobadze (RUS)
Extra-lightweight (−60 kg)	Dashdavaagiin Amartüvshin (MGL)	Askhat Telmanov (KAZ)	Pavel Petřikov (CZE)
Half-lightweight (−66 kg)	Davaadorjiin Tömörkhüleg (MGL)	Nijat Shikhalizada (AZE)	Shalva Kardava (GEO)
Half-lightweight (−66 kg)	Davaadorjiin Tömörkhüleg (MGL)	Nijat Shikhalizada (AZE)	Tristan Peikrishvili (GEO)
Lightweight (−73 kg)	Rustam Orujov (AZE)	Victor Scvortov (UAE)	Marcelo Contini (BRA)
Lightweight (−73 kg)	Rustam Orujov (AZE)	Victor Scvortov (UAE)	Huseyn Rahimli (AZE)
Half-middleweight (−81 kg)	Levan Tsiklauri (GEO)	Alain Schmitt (FRA)	Alan Khubetsov (RUS)
Half-middleweight (−81 kg)	Levan Tsiklauri (GEO)	Alain Schmitt (FRA)	Sergiu Toma (UAE)
Middleweight (−90 kg)	Shahin Gahramanov (AZE)	Valentyn Grekov (UKR)	Zviad Gogotchuri (GEO)
Middleweight (−90 kg)	Shahin Gahramanov (AZE)	Valentyn Grekov (UKR)	Alexandr Jurečka (CZE)
Half-heavyweight (−100 kg)	Elkhan Mammadov (AZE)	Erdenebilegiin Enkhbat (MGL)	Elmar Gasimov (AZE)
Half-heavyweight (−100 kg)	Elkhan Mammadov (AZE)	Erdenebilegiin Enkhbat (MGL)	Martin Pacek (SWE)
Heavyweight (+100 kg)	Walter Santos (BRA)	David Moura (BRA)	Levani Matiashvili (GEO)
Heavyweight (+100 kg)	Walter Santos (BRA)	David Moura (BRA)	Andrey Volkov (RUS)

=== Women's events ===
Event	Gold	Silver	Bronze
Extra-lightweight (−48 kg)	Ebru Şahin (TUR)	Otgontsetseg Galbadrakh (MGL)	Sümeyye Akkuş (TUR)
Extra-lightweight (−48 kg)	Ebru Şahin (TUR)	Otgontsetseg Galbadrakh (MGL)	Rada Abdrakhmanova Biktimirova (RUS)
Half-lightweight (−52 kg)	Jaana Sundberg (FIN)	Adiyaasambuugiin Tsolmon (MGL)	Mareen Kräh (GER)
Half-lightweight (−52 kg)	Jaana Sundberg (FIN)	Adiyaasambuugiin Tsolmon (MGL)	Oleksandra Starkova (UKR)
Lightweight (−57 kg)	Miryam Roper (GER)	Joliane Melançon (CAN)	Dorjsürengiin Sumiyaa (MGL)
Lightweight (−57 kg)	Miryam Roper (GER)	Joliane Melançon (CAN)	Kifayat Gasimova (AZE)
Half-middleweight (−63 kg)	Yarden Gerbi (ISR)	Tina Trstenjak (SLO)	Marijana Mišković Hasanbegović (CRO)
Half-middleweight (−63 kg)	Yarden Gerbi (ISR)	Tina Trstenjak (SLO)	Martyna Trajdos (GER)
Middleweight (−70 kg)	Kelita Zupancic (CAN)	Laura Vargas Koch (GER)	Sally Conway (GBR)
Middleweight (−70 kg)	Kelita Zupancic (CAN)	Laura Vargas Koch (GER)	Juliane Robra (SUI)
Half-heavyweight (−78 kg)	Abigél Joó (HUN)	Luise Malzahn (GER)	Ivana Maranić (CRO)
Half-heavyweight (−78 kg)	Abigél Joó (HUN)	Luise Malzahn (GER)	Catherine Roberge (CAN)
Heavyweight (+78 kg)	Maria Suelen Altheman (BRA)	Belkıs Zehra Kaya (TUR)	Gülşah Kocatürk (TUR)
Heavyweight (+78 kg)	Maria Suelen Altheman (BRA)	Belkıs Zehra Kaya (TUR)	Carolin Weiß (GER)

Source Results

=== Medal table ===
* Host nation (Azerbaijan)

Rank	Nation	Gold	Silver	Bronze	Total
1	Azerbaijan (AZE)*	3	1	3	7
2	Mongolia (MGL)	2	3	1	6
3	Brazil (BRA)	2	1	1	4
4	Germany (GER)	1	2	3	6
5	Turkey (TUR)	1	1	2	4
6	Canada (CAN)	1	1	1	3
7	Georgia (GEO)	1	0	4	5
8	Finland (FIN)	1	0	0	1
8	Hungary (HUN)	1	0	0	1
8	Israel (ISR)	1	0	0	1
11	Ukraine (UKR)	0	1	1	2
11	United Arab Emirates (UAE)	0	1	1	2
13	France (FRA)	0	1	0	1
13	Kazakhstan (KAZ)	0	1	0	1
13	Slovenia (SLO)	0	1	0	1
16	Russia (RUS)	0	0	4	4
17	Croatia (CRO)	0	0	2	2
17	Czech Republic (CZE)	0	0	2	2
19	Great Britain (GBR)	0	0	1	1
19	Sweden (SWE)	0	0	1	1
19	Switzerland (SUI)	0	0	1	1
Totals (21 entries)		14	14	28	56
