= Marcelo Contini =

Brazilian judoka (born 1989)

Marcel Contini
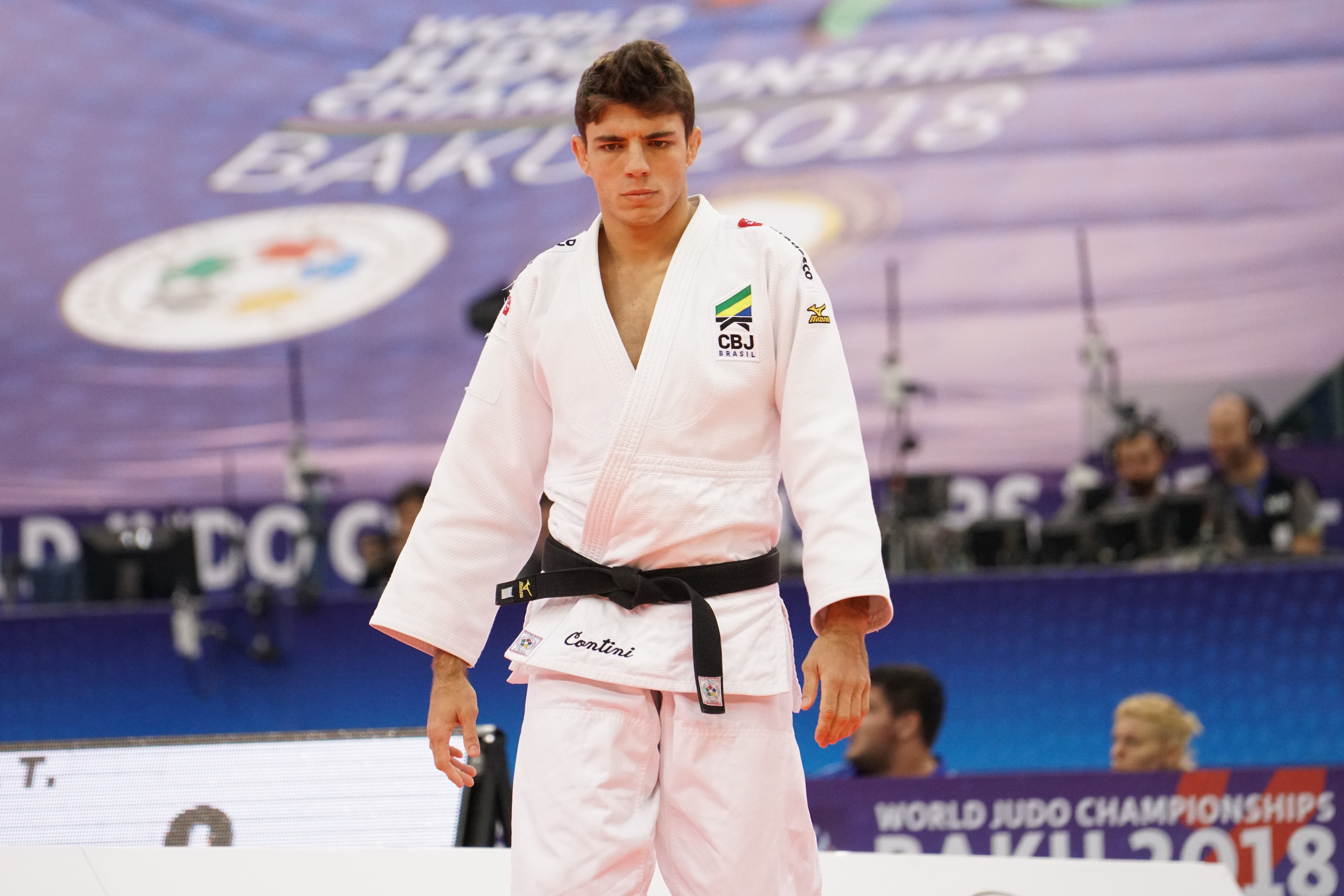

Personal information
- Nationality: Brazilian
- Born: 20 April 1989 (age 37) Campinas, SP
- Occupation: Judoka

Sport
- Country: Brazil
- Sport: Judo
- Weight class: –73 kg

Achievements and titles
- World Champ.: R32 (2015)
Medal record
Men's judo
Representing Brazil
IJF Grand Slam
Gold medal – first place	2012 Rio de Janeiro	–73 kg
Silver medal – second place	2014 Tyumen	–73 kg
Silver medal – second place	2017 Ekaterinburg	–73 kg
Bronze medal – third place	2013 Baku	–73 kg
IJF Grand Prix
Gold medal – first place	2017 Cancún	–73 kg
Bronze medal – third place	2018 Cancún	–73 kg
Summer Universiade
Bronze medal – third place	2011 Shenzhen	–73 kg

Profile at external databases
- IJF: 2426
- JudoInside.com: 49868
- Updated on 26 November 2022

Marcelo Contini (born 20 April 1989) is a Brazilian judoka.

He is the gold medallist of the 2017 Judo Grand Prix Cancún in the -73 kg category.
