= Judo at the 2014 Asian Games – Men's team =

Judo competition

Men's team at the 2014 Asian Games
- Venue: Dowon Gymnasium
- Date: 23 September 2014
- Competitors: 63 from 10 nations

Medalists
gold medal	South Korea; Choi Gwang-hyeon, Youn Tae-ho, Bang Gui-man, Kim Jae-bum, Gwak Dong-han, Lee Kyu-won, Kim Sung-min
silver medal	Kazakhstan; Azamat Mukanov, Yeldos Smetov, Dastan Ykybayev, Aziz Kalkamanuly, Timur Bolat, Maxim Rakov, Yerzhan Shynkeyev
bronze medal	Uzbekistan; Mirzohid Farmonov, Rishod Sobirov, Navruz Jurakobilov, Sarvar Shomurodov, Yakhyo Imamov, Dilshod Choriev, Soyib Kurbonov, Abdullo Tangriev
bronze medal	Japan; Tomofumi Takajo, Toru Shishime, Hiroyuki Akimoto, Keita Nagashima, Yuya Yoshida, Yusuke Kumashiro, Takeshi Ojitani

The men's team competition at the 2014 Asian Games in Incheon was held on 23 September at the Dowon Gymnasium.

== Schedule ==
All times are Korea Standard Time (UTC+09:00)

Date	Time	Event
Tuesday, 23 September 2014	14:00	Elimination round of 16
Tuesday, 23 September 2014	14:00	Quarterfinals
Tuesday, 23 September 2014	16:30	Semifinals
Tuesday, 23 September 2014	17:20	Final of repechage
Tuesday, 23 September 2014	20:00	Finals

== Results ==
=== Bracket ===
==== Main ====
Elimination round of 16
China	2
Iran	3
Nepal	1
Saudi Arabia	4

Quarterfinals
South Korea	5
Iran	0
Mongolia	5
Turkmenistan	0
Japan	2
Uzbekistan	3
Kazakhstan	5
Saudi Arabia	0

Semifinals
South Korea	5
Mongolia	0
Uzbekistan	2
Kazakhstan	3

Gold medal contest
South Korea	4
Kazakhstan	1

==== Repechage ====
Final of repechage
Iran	3
Turkmenistan	2
Japan	5
Saudi Arabia	0

Bronze medal contests
Iran	1
Uzbekistan	4
Japan	3
Mongolia	2

=== Elimination round of 16 ===
China	2–3	Iran

Ma Duanbin	100–000	Ehsan Bahramian	66 kg
Liu Wei	000–101	Saeid Mollaei	73 kg
Erihemubatu	000–101	Amir Ghaseminejad	81 kg
Cheng Xunzhao	102–000	Mohammad Jamali	90 kg
Liu Jian	000–000	Javad Mahjoub	+90 kg

Nepal	1–4	Saudi Arabia

Saroj Maharjan	000–110	Eisa Majrashi	66 kg
Ramesh Magar	000–011	Sulaiman Hamad	73 kg
—	000–100	Jaber Al-Harthi	81 kg
Shree Ram Makaju	000–110	Naif Ammar	90 kg
Rajan Joshi	100–000	—	+90 kg

=== Quarterfinals ===
South Korea	5–0	Iran

Youn Tae-ho	101–000	Ehsan Bahramian	66 kg
Bang Gui-man	100–001	Saeid Mollaei	73 kg
Kim Jae-bum	110–000	Amir Ghaseminejad	81 kg
Gwak Dong-han	100–000	—	90 kg
Kim Sung-min	100–000	—	+90 kg

Mongolia	5–0	Turkmenistan

Davaadorjiin Tömörkhüleg	101–000	Kemal Amanow	66 kg
Buuveibaataryn Khishigbayar	002–000	Samwel Aýrapetýan	73 kg
Nyamsürengiin Dagvasüren	012–000	Tejen Tejenow	81 kg
Khutagiin Tsogtgerel	101–000	Batyr Hojamuhammedow	90 kg
Ölziibayaryn Düürenbayar	100–000	Hudaýberdi Sahatow	+90 kg

Japan	2–3	Uzbekistan

Tomofumi Takajo	000–010	Rishod Sobirov	66 kg
Hiroyuki Akimoto	100–000	Navruz Jurakobilov	73 kg
Keita Nagashima	010–000	Yakhyo Imamov	81 kg
Yuya Yoshida	000–010	Dilshod Choriev	90 kg
Yusuke Kumashiro	000–000	Abdullo Tangriev	+90 kg

Kazakhstan	5–0	Saudi Arabia

Azamat Mukanov	100–000	Sulaiman Hamad	66 kg
Dastan Ykybayev	100–001	Jaber Al-Harthi	73 kg
Aziz Kalkamanuly	110–000	—	81 kg
Timur Bolat	100–000	Naif Ammar	90 kg
Yerzhan Shynkeyev	100–000	—	+90 kg

=== Semifinals ===
South Korea	5–0	Mongolia

Choi Gwang-hyeon	100–010	Davaadorjiin Tömörkhüleg	66 kg
Bang Gui-man	010–000	Ganbaataryn Odbayar	73 kg
Kim Jae-bum	111–000	Nyamsürengiin Dagvasüren	81 kg
Lee Kyu-won	100–000	Lkhagvasürengiin Otgonbaatar	90 kg
Kim Sung-min	100–000	Ölziibayaryn Düürenbayar	+90 kg

Uzbekistan	2–3	Kazakhstan

Rishod Sobirov	001–000	Azamat Mukanov	66 kg
Sarvar Shomurodov	001–002	Dastan Ykybayev	73 kg
Yakhyo Imamov	100–000	Aziz Kalkamanuly	81 kg
Dilshod Choriev	000–000	Timur Bolat	90 kg
Abdullo Tangriev	000–001	Maxim Rakov	+90 kg

=== Final of repechage ===
Iran	3–2	Turkmenistan

Ehsan Bahramian	100–000	Kemal Amanow	66 kg
—	000–100	Samwel Aýrapetýan	73 kg
Amir Ghaseminejad	110–000	Tejen Tejenow	81 kg
Mohammad Jamali	001–100	Batyr Hojamuhammedow	90 kg
Javad Mahjoub	101–000	Hudaýberdi Sahatow	+90 kg

Japan	5–0	Saudi Arabia

—	100–000	—	66 kg
—	100–000	—	73 kg
—	100–000	—	81 kg
—	100–000	—	90 kg
—	100–000	—	+90 kg

=== Bronze medal contests ===
Iran	1–4	Uzbekistan

Ehsan Bahramian	000–100	Rishod Sobirov	66 kg
—	000–100	Navruz Jurakobilov	73 kg
Amir Ghaseminejad	000–001	Yakhyo Imamov	81 kg
Mohammad Jamali	000–000	Dilshod Choriev	90 kg
Javad Mahjoub	000–101	Soyib Kurbonov	+90 kg

Japan	3–2	Mongolia

Tomofumi Takajo	000–100	Davaadorjiin Tömörkhüleg	66 kg
Hiroyuki Akimoto	100–000	Buuveibaataryn Khishigbayar	73 kg
Keita Nagashima	100–000	Nyamsürengiin Dagvasüren	81 kg
Yuya Yoshida	100–000	Khutagiin Tsogtgerel	90 kg
Yusuke Kumashiro	010–010	Naidangiin Tüvshinbayar	+90 kg

=== Gold medal contest ===
South Korea	4–1	Kazakhstan

Choi Gwang-hyeon	000–010	Azamat Mukanov	66 kg
Bang Gui-man	010–010	Dastan Ykybayev	73 kg
Kim Jae-bum	100–000	Aziz Kalkamanuly	81 kg
Lee Kyu-won	001–000	Timur Bolat	90 kg
Kim Sung-min	100–000	Yerzhan Shynkeyev	+90 kg

== Non-participating athletes ==
- He Yunlong (CHN)
- Xu Jie (CHN)
- Yeldos Smetov (KAZ)
- Ganbatyn Boldbaatar (MGL)
- Mirzohid Farmonov (UZB)
