= Yūsuke Kumashiro =

Japanese judoka (born 1988)

Personal information
- Nationality: Japanese
- Born: 3 June 1988 (age 38)
- Occupation: Judoka

Sport
- Country: Japan
- Sport: Judo
- Weight class: –100 kg, +100 kg

Achievements and titles
- Asian Champ.: R16 (2014)
Medal record
Men's judo
Representing Japan
Asian Games
Bronze medal – third place	2014 Incheon	Men's team
IJF Grand Prix
Gold medal – first place	2012 Qingdao	‍–‍100 kg
Bronze medal – third place	2020 Tel Aviv	+100 kg

Profile at external databases
- IJF: 4012
- JudoInside.com: 72556
- Updated on 21 May 2023

Yūsuke Kumashiro (born 3 June 1988) is a Japanese judoka.

He is the bronze medallist of the 2020 Judo Grand Prix Tel Aviv in the +100 kg category.
