= Frédéric Lecanu =

French judoka (born 1979)

Frédéric Lecanu (born 2 April 1979) is a French judoka.

== Achievements ==
Year	Tournament	Place	Weight class
2003	Universiade	2nd	Open class
2002	European Judo Championships	5th	Heavyweight (+100 kg)
