= Alex Pombo =

Brazilian judoka (born 1988)

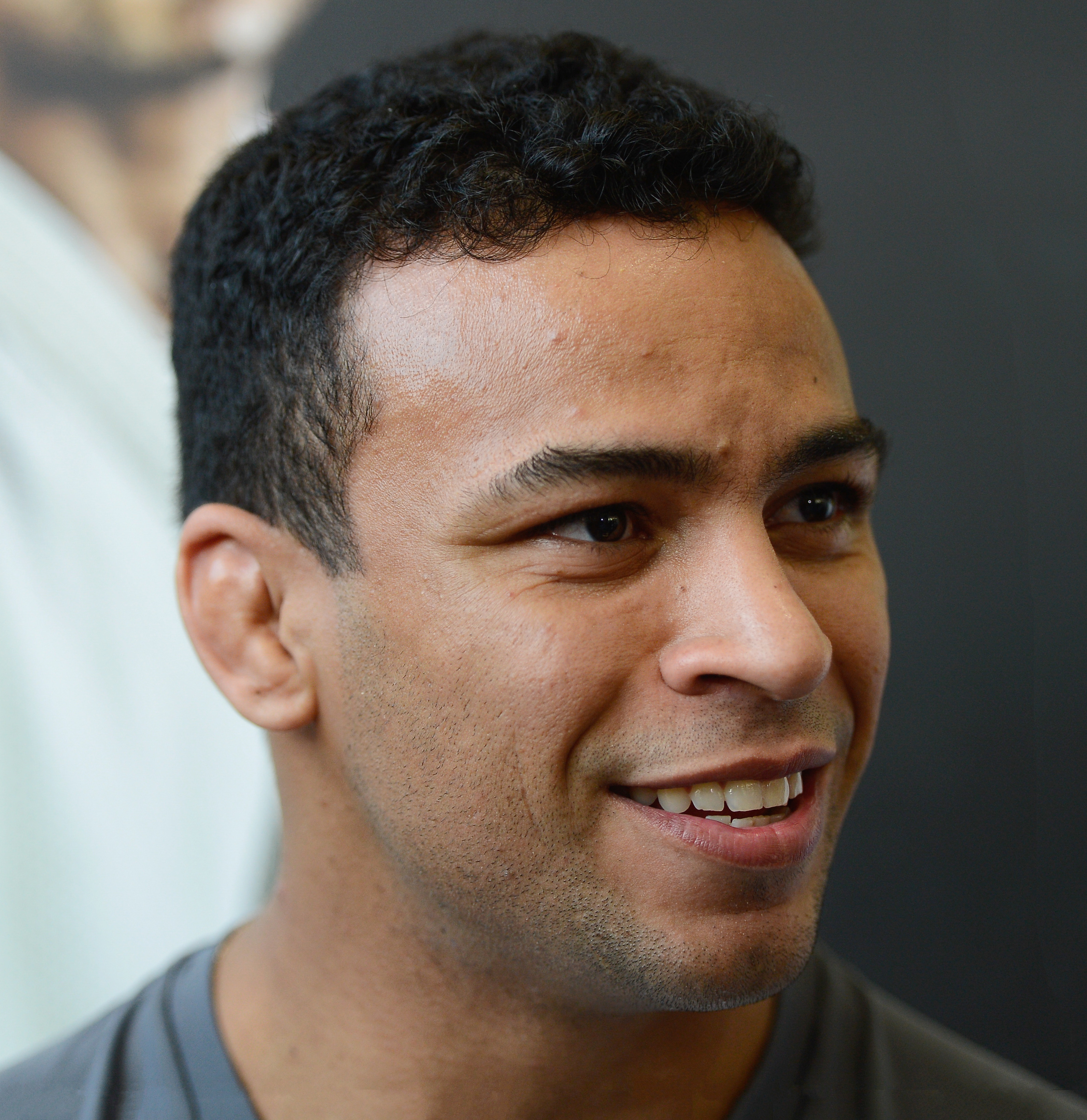
- Pombo in 2016

Personal information
- Born: 21 July 1988 (age 37) Guaratinguetá, Brazil
- Occupation: Judoka
- Height: 174 cm (5 ft 9 in)

Sport
- Country: Brazil
- Sport: Judo
- Weight class: –73 kg
- Club: Minas Tênis Clube
- Coached by: Floriano Almeida

Achievements and titles
- Olympic Games: R32 (2016)
- World Champ.: R64 (2014)
- Pan American Champ.: (2014, 2015)
Medal record
Men's judo
Representing Brazil
Pan American Championships
Gold medal – first place	2014 Guayaquil	–73 kg
Gold medal – first place	2015 Edmonton	–73 kg
Silver medal – second place	2016 Havana	–73 kg
IJF Grand Slam
Bronze medal – third place	2012 Rio de Janeiro	–73 kg
Bronze medal – third place	2014 Tyumen	–73 kg
IJF Grand Prix
Gold medal – first place	2013 Almaty	–73 kg
Silver medal – second place	2013 Tashkent	–73 kg

Profile at external databases
- IJF: 2425
- JudoInside.com: 49866
- Updated on 26 November 2022

Alex William Pombo Silva (born 21 July 1988) is a lightweight judoka from Brazil. He won two gold and one silver medal at the Pan American Championships in 2014–16, but was eliminated in a second bout at the 2016 Olympics.

== Biography ==
Alex Pombo is a judoka of Minas Tênis Clube and the Brazilian national judo team. The athlete was born in Guaratinguetá. He began his career at age 12, in São José dos Campos, in the state of São Paulo, and is part of the national team in its category since 17 years.

The judoka demonstrated several times its fierce, determined and victorious posture. Alex was born prematurely with only 850g and 26 cm and had to fight for life in its early days. Career on the mats during the dispute of the World Military edition, the judoka competed with a trauma in the fifth lumbar budget. Not enough to overcome the pain, the athlete cut eyebrow during the dispute of the bronze medal. Referees wanted to end the fighting, but determined to get on the podium, Alex did not accept and asked that the dispute continued. In the end, he won the victory, the medal, and left the gym straight to the hospital where he had surgery.

Occupying a position among the world's best in its category, judoka has a successful career with several medals from major competitions on the world circuit. The athlete is the current champion of Judo Pan American Championship and Brazilian champion in its category. Also, it is often on the podiums of the tournaments in the world circuit mode.
