= Lee Won-hee =

South Korean judoka (born 1981)

Personal information
- Nationality: South Korean
- Born: 19 July 1981 (age 45) Seoul, South Korea
- Education: Yongin University
- Occupation: Judoka
- Height: 172 cm (5 ft 8 in)
- Spouses: Kim Mi-hyun (m. 2008–2012); Yun Ji-hye (m. 2018)

Korean name
- Hangul: 이원희
- Hanja: 李元熹
- RR: I Wonhui
- MR: I Wŏnhŭi

Sport
- Country: South Korea
- Sport: Judo
- Weight class: –73 kg
- Rank: 5th dan black belt
- Now coaching: South Korea National Team (Women); Kim Jan-di, Jeong Bo-kyeong, Kim Seong-yeon, Kim Min-jeong, Bak Ji-yun

Achievements and titles
- Olympic Games: (gold) (2004)
- World Champ.: (gold) (2003)
- Asian Champ.: (gold) (2003, 2006)
- Highest world ranking: 1st (2003, 2004)
Medal record
Men's judo
Representing South Korea
Olympic Games
Gold medal – first place	2004 Athens	‍–‍73 kg
World Championships
Gold medal – first place	2003 Osaka	‍–‍73 kg
Asian Games
Gold medal – first place	2006 Doha	‍–‍73 kg
Asian Championships
Gold medal – first place	2003 Jeju	‍–‍73 kg
Summer Universiade
Gold medal – first place	2003 Jeju	‍–‍73 kg

Profile at external databases
- IJF: 11643
- JudoInside.com: 13491
- Updated on 30 May 2023

Lee Won-hee (Korean: 이원희; born 19 July 1981) is a South Korean quadruple judo champion. Lee won the gold medal in the men's lightweight division at the 2004 Summer Olympics in Athens, Greece. He was the world champion in 2003. He also won the gold medal in 2006 Asian Games and 2003 Asian Judo Championships.

He won his Olympic gold medal by way of Ippon against Vitaly Makarov of Russia with 9 seconds left. He was leading in the bout anyway, but had secured the win when he went in for Drop Seoi Nage and combined it with Kouchi gari to deliver Makarov onto his back with force. He was voted top judoka in the 2004 Olympics. Lee was renowned for his favourite technique Tai Otoshi.

Lee is arguably one of the best South Korean judokas ever to live. During his active career, he was nicknamed "Mr. Ippon" and "Grand Slammer" for his 48-game winning streak, of which, 43 were won by ippon. He lost to Wang Ki-chun in the qualifications for the 2007 World Championships in Rio de Janeiro and 2008 Olympics in Beijing.

Lee taught judo at his alma mater Yong In University. In 2015, he was promoted to head coach of the South Korean Women's Judo National Team.

== Personal life ==
Lee attended Boseong Middle School.

In 2008, Lee married golfer Kim Mi-hyun, and they have a son, Yeseong. The couple divorced in 2012.

In 2018, Lee married South Korean table tennis player Yun Ji-Hye and have a daughter together.

== Filmography ==
Year	Title	Role	Notes	Ref.
2024	Physical: 100	Contestant	Season 2	
2022	Gukttaeneun Gukttaeda (국대는 국대다)	Guest	Ep 13-14	
2019	The Gentlemen's League	Guest	Ep 19	
2016	King of Mask Singer	Contestant	Ep 83	
2016	Cool Kiz on The Block	Coach	Ep 138-143	
2015	Running Man	Contestant	Ep 271-272	
2015	Cool Kiz on The Block	Coach	Ep 125-137	
