= Masahiro Takamatsu =

Japanese judoka (born 1982)

Personal information
- Born: 27 February 1982 (age 44) Fujimino
- Occupation: Judoka

Sport
- Country: Japan
- Sport: Judo
- Weight class: ‍–‍73 kg, ‍–‍81 kg

Achievements and titles
- Olympic Games: R32 (2004)
- World Champ.: (bronze) (2010)
- Asian Champ.: (silver) (2006, 2009, 2010)
Medal record
Men's judo
Representing Japan
World Championships
Gold medal – first place	2002 Basel	Men's team
Gold medal – first place	2010 Antalya	Men's team
Silver medal – second place	2005 Cairo	Men's team
Bronze medal – third place	2010 Tokyo	‍–‍81 kg
Asian Games
Silver medal – second place	2006 Doha	‍–‍73 kg
Silver medal – second place	2010 Guangzhou	‍–‍81 kg
Asian Championships
Silver medal – second place	2009 Taipei	‍–‍81 kg
Bronze medal – third place	2004 Almaty	‍–‍73 kg
IJF Grand Slam
Silver medal – second place	2010 Tokyo	‍–‍81 kg
World Juniors Championships
Gold medal – first place	2000 Nabeul	‍–‍73 kg
Summer Universiade
Silver medal – second place	2003 Jeju	‍–‍73 kg

Profile at external databases
- IJF: 2179
- JudoInside.com: 11844
- Updated on 25 July 2023

Masahiro Takamatsu (高松 正裕, Takamatsu Masahiro; born 27 February 1982) is a Japanese judoka.

Takamatsu was born in Kamifukuoka, Saitama., and began judo at the age of 8. He entered the Asahi Kasei after graduating from Tsukuba University.

Takamatsu is good at Seoi nage, Osotogari and Osaekomi-waza. and got gold medal of 2000 World Juniors Championships held at Nabeul.

As of 2010, Takamatsu coaches judo at his alma mater, Toin Gakuen, where he previously studied as an undergraduate.
