= Jessica van der Spil =

Dutch judoka

Jessica van der Spil (born 18 June 1979 in Goes) is a Dutch female judoka.

== Achievements ==
Year	Tournament	Place	Weight class
2003	European Championships	7th	Open class
2003	Universiade	3rd	Heavyweight (+78 kg)
