= Bang Gui-man =

South Korean judoka (born 1983)

Personal information
- Born: 4 May 1983 (age 43) Namyangju, Gyeonggi, South Korea
- Occupation: Judoka
- Height: 1.73 m (5 ft 8 in)

Korean name
- Hangul: 방귀만
- RR: Bang Gwiman
- MR: Pang Kwiman

Sport
- Country: South Korea
- Sport: Judo
- Weight class: ‍–‍66 kg, ‍–‍73 kg
- Club: Namyangju City Hall
- Coached by: Cho In-chul

Achievements and titles
- Olympic Games: R32 (2004)
- World Champ.: R16 (2007)
- Asian Champ.: (gold) (2007, 2009)
Medal record
Men's judo
Representing South Korea
Asian Games
Gold medal – first place	2014 Incheon	Men's team
Bronze medal – third place	2014 Incheon	‍–‍73 kg
Asian Championships
Gold medal – first place	2007 Kuwait City	‍–‍66 kg
Gold medal – first place	2009 Taipei	‍–‍73 kg
Bronze medal – third place	2004 Almaty	‍–‍66 kg
Bronze medal – third place	2005 Tashkent	‍–‍66 kg
World Masters
Gold medal – first place	2010 Suwon	‍–‍73 kg
IJF Grand Slam
Gold medal – first place	2014 Paris	‍–‍73 kg
Silver medal – second place	2010 Moscow	‍–‍73 kg
Silver medal – second place	2013 Tokyo	‍–‍73 kg
IJF Grand Prix
Gold medal – first place	2009 Qingdao	‍–‍73 kg
Gold medal – first place	2013 Rijeka	‍–‍73 kg

Profile at external databases
- IJF: 1847
- JudoInside.com: 28403
- Updated on 20 November 2022

Bang Gui-man (Korean: 방귀만; born 4 May 1983, in Namyangju, Gyeonggi) is a South Korean judoka, who competed in the men's lightweight category. He represented his nation South Korea at the 2004 Summer Olympics, picked up four medals in the 66 and 73 kg division at the Asian Judo Championships, and earned a bronze medal at the 2014 Asian Games in Incheon. Throughout his sporting career, Bang trained for Namyangju City Hall's elite judo squad under his longtime coach and mentor Cho In-chul.

Bang qualified for the South Korean squad in the men's half-lightweight class (66 kg) at the 2004 Summer Olympics in Athens, by placing third and receiving a berth from the 2004 Asian Championships in Almaty. He lost his opening match to Brazilian judoka and 1996 Olympic bronze medalist Henrique Guimarães, who successfully scored an ippon and an ōuchi gari (big inner reap), at two minutes and twenty-one seconds.

When South Korea hosted the 2014 Asian Games in Incheon, Bang culminated his ten-year career medal drought from the international scene to score an ippon victory over 2012 Olympian Navruz Jurakobilov of Uzbekistan for a bronze in the men's 73 kg class. Two days later, he helped his fellow South Korean teammates outplay their Kazakh rivals to top the medal podium with a gold in the team competition.

After the World Cup in Rome in October 2010 he tested positive for banner stimulant drug methylhexanamine and was banned for 2 years.
