= 2007 Asian Judo Championships =

Judo competition

The 2007 Asian Judo Championships were held in Kuwait City, Kuwait from 16 May to 17 May 2007.

== Medal summary ==
=== Men ===
Event	Gold	Silver	Bronze
Extra lightweight −60 kg	Masoud Haji Akhondzadeh; Iran	Rishod Sobirov; Uzbekistan	Bazarbek Donbay; Kazakhstan
Extra lightweight −60 kg	Masoud Haji Akhondzadeh; Iran	Rishod Sobirov; Uzbekistan	Choi Min-ho; South Korea
Half lightweight −66 kg	Bang Gui-man; South Korea	Khashbaataryn Tsagaanbaatar; Mongolia	Arash Miresmaeili; Iran
Half lightweight −66 kg	Bang Gui-man; South Korea	Khashbaataryn Tsagaanbaatar; Mongolia	Toshiaki Umetsu; Japan
Lightweight −73 kg	Kim Chol-su; North Korea	Rasul Boqiev; Tajikistan	Shokir Muminov; Uzbekistan
Lightweight −73 kg	Kim Chol-su; North Korea	Rasul Boqiev; Tajikistan	Huang Chun-ta; Chinese Taipei
Half middleweight −81 kg	Kwon Young-woo; South Korea	Sherali Bozorov; Tajikistan	Egamnazar Akbarov; Uzbekistan
Half middleweight −81 kg	Kwon Young-woo; South Korea	Sherali Bozorov; Tajikistan	Takashi Ono; Japan
Middleweight −90 kg	Choi Sun-ho; South Korea	Nematullo Asranqulov; Tajikistan	Maxim Rakov; Kazakhstan
Middleweight −90 kg	Choi Sun-ho; South Korea	Nematullo Asranqulov; Tajikistan	Danil Babaev; Kyrgyzstan
Half heavyweight −100 kg	Takamasa Anai; Japan	Naidangiin Tüvshinbayar; Mongolia	Utkir Kurbanov; Uzbekistan
Half heavyweight −100 kg	Takamasa Anai; Japan	Naidangiin Tüvshinbayar; Mongolia	Yoo Kwang-sun; South Korea
Heavyweight +100 kg	Abdullo Tangriev; Uzbekistan	Mohammad Reza Roudaki; Iran	Shinya Katabuchi; Japan
Heavyweight +100 kg	Abdullo Tangriev; Uzbekistan	Mohammad Reza Roudaki; Iran	Kim Sung-bum; South Korea
Openweight	Shinya Katabuchi; Japan	Mahmoud Miran; Iran	Youssef Al-Moneer; Syria
Openweight	Shinya Katabuchi; Japan	Mahmoud Miran; Iran	Kim Sung-bum; South Korea

=== Women ===
Event	Gold	Silver	Bronze
Extra lightweight −48 kg	Emi Yamagishi; Japan	Kim Young-ran; South Korea	Tombi Devi; India
Extra lightweight −48 kg	Emi Yamagishi; Japan	Kim Young-ran; South Korea	Pak Ok-song; North Korea
Half lightweight −52 kg	Shi Junjie; China	Pak Myong-hui; North Korea	Natsuko Kimishima; Japan
Half lightweight −52 kg	Shi Junjie; China	Pak Myong-hui; North Korea	Kim Kyung-ok; South Korea
Lightweight −57 kg	Aiko Sato; Japan	Xu Yan; China	Khishigbatyn Erdenet-Od; Mongolia
Lightweight −57 kg	Aiko Sato; Japan	Xu Yan; China	Lee Eun-hee; South Korea
Half middleweight −63 kg	Yoshie Ueno; Japan	Dou Shumei; China	Marian Urdabayeva; Kazakhstan
Half middleweight −63 kg	Yoshie Ueno; Japan	Dou Shumei; China	Hong Ok-song; North Korea
Middleweight −70 kg	Asuka Oka; Japan	Zhanar Zhanzunova; Kazakhstan	Kim Mi-jung; South Korea
Middleweight −70 kg	Asuka Oka; Japan	Zhanar Zhanzunova; Kazakhstan	Khüreldorjiin Batkhishig; Mongolia
Half heavyweight −78 kg	Liu Xia; China	Pürevjargalyn Lkhamdegd; Mongolia	Kumiko Horie; Japan
Half heavyweight −78 kg	Liu Xia; China	Pürevjargalyn Lkhamdegd; Mongolia	Sagat Abikeyeva; Kazakhstan
Heavyweight +78 kg	Midori Shintani; Japan	Dorjgotovyn Tserenkhand; Mongolia	Lee Jung-eun; South Korea
Heavyweight +78 kg	Midori Shintani; Japan	Dorjgotovyn Tserenkhand; Mongolia	Yuan Hua; China
Openweight	Yuan Hua; China	Mai Tateyama; Japan	Gulzhan Issanova; Kazakhstan
Openweight	Yuan Hua; China	Mai Tateyama; Japan	Lee Jung-eun; South Korea

== Medal table ==
Rank	Nation	Gold	Silver	Bronze	Total
1	Japan	7	1	5	13
2	China	3	2	1	6
3	South Korea	3	1	9	13
4	Iran	1	2	1	4
5	Uzbekistan	1	1	3	5
6	North Korea	1	1	2	4
7	Mongolia	0	4	2	6
8	Tajikistan	0	3	0	3
9	Kazakhstan	0	1	5	6
10	Chinese Taipei	0	0	1	1
10	India	0	0	1	1
10	Kyrgyzstan	0	0	1	1
10	Syria	0	0	1	1
Totals (13 entries)		16	16	32	64
