= Judo at the 2010 Asian Games – Men's 81 kg =

Judo competition

Men's 81 kg at the 2010 Asian Games
- Venue: Huagong Gymnasium
- Date: 14 November 2010
- Competitors: 18 from 18 nations

Medalists
gold medal	Kim Jae-bum	South Korea
silver medal	Islam Bozbayev	Kazakhstan
silver medal	Masahiro Takamatsu	Japan

The men's 81 kilograms (half middleweight) competition at the 2010 Asian Games in Guangzhou was held on 14 November at the Huagong Gymnasium.

== Schedule ==
All times are China Standard Time (UTC+08:00)

Date	Time	Event
Sunday, 14 November 2010	10:00	Preliminary 1
Sunday, 14 November 2010	10:00	Preliminary 2
Sunday, 14 November 2010	10:00	Quarterfinals
Sunday, 14 November 2010	15:00	Final of repechage
Sunday, 14 November 2010	15:00	Final of table
Sunday, 14 November 2010	15:00	Finals

== Results ==
=== Main bracket ===
==== Final ====
Gold medal
Kim Jae-bum (KOR)	110
Shokir Muminov (UZB)	000

==== Top half ====
Preliminary 1
Watcharin Jampawong (THA)	000
Meshal Sheaibi (IOC)	002

Preliminary 2
Kim Jae-bum (KOR)	100
John Baylon (PHI)	000
Waleed Hanafi (QAT)	001
Naif Ammar (KSA)	000
Si Rijigawa (CHN)	111
Meshal Sheaibi (IOC)	000
Otgonbaataryn Uuganbaatar (MGL)	101
Alimbek Dzhusupov (KGZ)	001

Quarterfinals
Kim Jae-bum (KOR)	100
Waleed Hanafi (QAT)	000
Si Rijigawa (CHN)	000
Otgonbaataryn Uuganbaatar (MGL)	001

Final of table
Kim Jae-bum (KOR)	001
Otgonbaataryn Uuganbaatar (MGL)	000

==== Bottom half ====
Preliminary 1
Röwşen Amandurdyýew (TKM)	100
Hussein Ali (IRQ)	000

Preliminary 2
Shokir Muminov (UZB)	110
Röwşen Amandurdyýew (TKM)	000
Mohammad Jamali (IRI)	100
Farhod Rahimov (TJK)	010
Masahiro Takamatsu (JPN)	100
Lê Khắc Nhân (VIE)	000
Islam Bozbayev (KAZ)	100
Georges Merheb (LIB)	000

Quarterfinals
Shokir Muminov (UZB)	010
Mohammad Jamali (IRI)	000
Masahiro Takamatsu (JPN)	000
Islam Bozbayev (KAZ)	100

Final of table
Shokir Muminov (UZB)	000
Islam Bozbayev (KAZ)	000

=== Repechage ===
Final of repechage
Waleed Hanafi (QAT)	000
Si Rijigawa (CHN)	101
Mohammad Jamali (IRI)	000
Masahiro Takamatsu (JPN)	100

Bronze medals
Si Rijigawa (CHN)	010
Islam Bozbayev (KAZ)	100
Masahiro Takamatsu (JPN)	100
Otgonbaataryn Uuganbaatar (MGL)	001

- Shokir Muminov of Uzbekistan originally won the silver medal, but was disqualified after he tested positive for Methylhexanamine. Masahiro Takamatsu and Islam Bozbayev were raised to joint second and took silver medals.
