= Shinya Katabuchi =

Japanese judoka (born 1983)

Personal information
- Born: 24 October 1983 (age 42)
- Occupation: Judoka

Sport
- Country: Japan
- Sport: Judo
- Weight class: +100 kg

Achievements and titles
- Asian Champ.: (gold) (2007)
Medal record
Men's judo
Representing Japan
Asian Championships
Gold medal – first place	2007 Kuwait City	Open
Bronze medal – third place	2007 Kuwait City	+100 kg
Bronze medal – third place	2008 Jeju	+100 kg
World Juniors Championships
Bronze medal – third place	2002 Jeju	+100 kg
Asian Junior Championships
Silver medal – second place	2001 Hi Chi Minh	+100 kg
Summer Universiade
Bronze medal – third place	2003 Daegu	Open

Profile at external databases
- JudoInside.com: 22945
- Updated on 16 February 2022

Shinya Katabuchi (片渕 慎弥, Katabuchi Shin'ya; born 24 October 1983) is a Japanese judoka. He was born in Kishiwada, Osaka, and began judo at the age of 8. He entered the Japan Racing Association after graduating from Kokushikan University. On 9 December 2007, he defeated world champion Teddy Riner at Jigoro Kano Cup Judo World Grandprix.
