= Shokir Muminov =

Uzbekistani judoka (born 1983)

Personal information
- Born: 17 February 1983 (age 43)
- Occupation: Judoka

Sport
- Country: Uzbekistan
- Sport: Judo
- Weight class: ‍–‍73 kg, ‍–‍81 kg

Achievements and titles
- Olympic Games: 9th (2008)
- World Champ.: 9th (2007)
- Asian Champ.: (bronze) (2003, 2006, 2007, 2009)
Medal record
Men's judo
Representing Uzbekistan
Asian Games
Bronze medal – third place	2006 Doha	‍–‍73 kg
Asian Championships
Bronze medal – third place	2003 Jeju	‍–‍73 kg
Bronze medal – third place	2007 Kuwait City	‍–‍73 kg
Bronze medal – third place	2009 Taipei	‍–‍81 kg
World Masters
Bronze medal – third place	2010 Suwon	‍–‍81 kg
IJF Grand Prix
Bronze medal – third place	2010 Tunis	‍–‍81 kg

Profile at external databases
- IJF: 706
- JudoInside.com: 27274
- Updated on 20 November 2022

Shokir Muminov (born 17 February 1983) is an Uzbek judoka.

Muminov won a bronze medal at the lightweight (73 kg) category of the 2006 Asian Games, defeating Aidar Kabimollayev of Kazakhstan at the bronze medal match. At the 2010 Asian Games held in Guangzhou, he tested positive for methylhexanamine and was stripped of his silver medal.
