= Hiroyuki Akimoto =

Japanese judoka (born 1986)

Personal information
- Native name: 秋本 啓之
- Born: 31 January 1986 (age 40) Amakusa, Kumamoto, Japan
- Occupation: Judoka
- Height: 170 cm (5 ft 7 in)
- Spouse: Ai Ōtomo (m. 2013)

Sport
- Country: Japan
- Sport: Judo
- Weight class: ‍–‍73 kg

Achievements and titles
- World Champ.: (gold) (2010)
- Asian Champ.: (gold) (2010, 2014)
Medal record
Men's judo
Representing Japan
World Championships
Gold medal – first place	2010 Tokyo	‍–‍73 kg
Asian Games
Gold medal – first place	2010 Guangzhou	‍–‍73 kg
Gold medal – first place	2014 Incheon	‍–‍73 kg
Bronze medal – third place	2006 Doha	‍–‍66 kg
Bronze medal – third place	2014 Incheon	Men's team
World Masters
Bronze medal – third place	2012 Almaty	‍–‍73 kg
IJF Grand Slam
Gold medal – first place	2010 Rio de Janeiro	‍–‍73 kg
Gold medal – first place	2011 Tokyo	‍–‍73 kg
Gold medal – first place	2014 Tokyo	‍–‍73 kg
Gold medal – first place	2015 Paris	‍–‍73 kg
Gold medal – first place	2015 Tokyo	‍–‍73 kg
Silver medal – second place	2010 Paris	‍–‍73 kg
Bronze medal – third place	2016 Paris	‍–‍73 kg
IJF Grand Prix
Gold medal – first place	2014 Düsseldorf	‍–‍73 kg
Silver medal – second place	2010 Tunis	‍–‍73 kg
World Juniors Championships
Gold medal – first place	2004 Budapest	‍–‍66 kg

Profile at external databases
- IJF: 2206
- JudoInside.com: 32243
- Updated on 25 July 2023

Hiroyuki Akimoto (秋本 啓之, Akimoto Hiroyuki; born 31 January 1986 in Amakusa, Kumamoto) is a Japanese judoka. After moving up from the ‍–‍66 kg division to the ‍–‍73 kg division, he won the gold medal in the lightweight division (73 kg) at the 2010 World Judo Championships.

== Personal life ==
Akimoto married volleyball player Ai Ōtomo on August 8, 2013. The couple has four children; their eldest daughter (from Ōtomo's previous marriage), Miku Akimoto, is also a professional volleyball player.
