= Rustam Boqiev =

Tajikistani judoka

Personal information
- Nationality: Tajikistani
- Born: 21 January 1978 (age 48) Leninskiy, Tajik SSR, Soviet Union

Sport
- Sport: Judo

Rustam Boqiev (born 21 January 1978) is a Tajikistani judoka. He competed in the men's extra-lightweight event at the 1996 Summer Olympics.
