= Susantha Kumara Nawarathne =

Sri Lankan politician

Hon. Susantha Kumara Nawarathne MP
- සුසන්ත කුමාර නවරත්න சுசந்த குமார நவரத்தின
- Incumbent
- Assumed office 18 November 2024
- President: Anura Kumara Dissanayake
- Prime Minister: Harini Amarasuriya

Member of Parliament for Anuradhapura District
- Incumbent
- Assumed office 21 November 2024
- Majority: 71,695 Preferential votes

Personal details
- Born: 12 June 1973 (age 52)
- Party: National People's Power
- Occupation: Farmer, Trade Union Activist

Susantha Kumara Nawarathne is a Sri Lankan politician, farmer, and trade union activist who serves as a member of parliament for the Anuradhapura Electoral District. He was elected in the 2024 Sri Lankan parliamentary election, receiving 71,695 preferential votes. He is affiliated with the National People's Power coalition and is known for his advocacy for farmers' rights.

== Early life and education ==
Susantha Kumara Nawarathne completed his primary education at Rambewa Pandukabhayapura Primary School and secondary education at Niwaththakachethiya Vidyalaya, Anuradhapura.

== Career ==
=== Trade union activism ===
Nawarathne has been a prominent trade union activist and serves as the National Organizer of the National Centre for the Protection of Dairy Farmers. He has actively campaigned for better conditions and fair prices for dairy farmers in Sri Lanka.

=== Political career ===
In 2024, Nawarathne was elected to the 17th Parliament of Sri Lanka, representing the Anuradhapura District as part of the National People's Power coalition. His political platform focused on improving the livelihoods of farmers, promoting rural development, and supporting cultural and community activities.

== See also ==
- 2024 Sri Lankan parliamentary election
- National People's Power
- Parliament of Sri Lanka
