= Navruz Jurakobilov =

Uzbekistani judoka

Personal information
- Born: 17 March 1984 (age 42) Kashkadarya Region, Uzbekistan
- Occupation: Judoka
- Height: 172 cm (5 ft 8 in)

Sport
- Country: Uzbekistan
- Sport: Judo
- Weight class: ‍–‍73 kg

Achievements and titles
- Olympic Games: R16 (2012)
- World Champ.: (bronze) (2011)
- Asian Champ.: (bronze) (2010, 2012)
Medal record
Men's judo
Representing Uzbekistan
World Championships
| Bronze medal – third place | 2011 Paris | ‍–‍73 kg |
Asian Games
| Bronze medal – third place | 2010 Guangzhou | ‍–‍73 kg |
| Bronze medal – third place | 2014 Incheon | Men's team |
Asian Championships
| Bronze medal – third place | 2012 Tashkent | ‍–‍73 kg |
IJF Grand Slam
| Silver medal – second place | 2012 Moscow | ‍–‍73 kg |
| Bronze medal – third place | 2013 Moscow | ‍–‍73 kg |
IJF Grand Prix
| Gold medal – first place | 2011 Baku | ‍–‍73 kg |
| Bronze medal – third place | 2010 Düsseldorf | ‍–‍73 kg |
World Juniors Championships
| Bronze medal – third place | 2002 Jeju | ‍–‍66 kg |
Asian Junior Championships
| Silver medal – second place | 2003 Macau | ‍–‍73 kg |

Profile at external databases
- IJF: 704
- JudoInside.com: 26873
- Updated on 17 July 2023

Navruz Jurakobilov (Навруз Джуракобилов, born 17 March 1984) is an Uzbek judoka. He competed at the 2012 Summer Olympics, but eliminated in the round of 16 by Rasul Boqiev.
