= Rasul Boqiev =

Tajikistani judoka (born 1982)

Personal information
- Born: 29 September 1982 (age 43) Rudaki, Tajik SSR, Soviet Union
- Occupation: Judoka
- Height: 1.7 m (5 ft 7 in)

Sport
- Country: Tajikistan
- Sport: Judo
- Weight class: ‍–‍73 kg
- Coached by: Vladimir Nikolaevich Elchaninov

Achievements and titles
- Olympic Games: (bronze) (2008)
- World Champ.: (bronze) (2007)
- Asian Champ.: (silver) (2007)
Medal record
Men's judo
Representing Tajikistan
Olympic Games
Bronze medal – third place	2008 Beijing	‍–‍73 kg
World Championships
Bronze medal – third place	2007 Rio de Janeiro	‍–‍73 kg
Asian Games
Bronze medal – third place	2006 Doha	‍–‍73 kg
Bronze medal – third place	2010 Guangzhou	‍–‍73 kg
Asian Championships
Silver medal – second place	2007 Kuwait City	‍–‍73 kg
Bronze medal – third place	2005 Tashkent	‍–‍73 kg
Bronze medal – third place	2012 Tashkent	‍–‍73 kg

Profile at external databases
- IJF: 4303
- JudoInside.com: 37284
- Updated on 30 May 2023

Rasul Boqiev (also spelled as Rasul Bokiev (Tajik: Расул Боқиев); born 29 September 1982) is a Tajikistani judoka who competes in the ‍–‍73 kg (lightweight) category. He has won bronze medal at the 2007 World Judo Championships and a bronze medal, Tajikistan's first ever Olympic medal, at the 2008 Summer Olympics.

== Career ==
Boqiev is considered one of the top athletes in Tajikistan and the world in the judo under 73 kg weight-class. Since his first international competition at the 2005 Asian Championships in Tashkent, where he won the bronze medal, he has been successful in showing results of consistent improvement and athleticism. The following year he also won a bronze medal at the lightweight (73 kg) category of the 2006 Asian Games, winning the bronze medal match against Kim Chol-su of North Korea. In the same year he claimed the 2nd place at the 2006 Otto Super World Cup Hamburg. On 17 February 2007, he won the 2007 World Cup Budapest and on 17 May he won the bronze medal at the 2007 Asian Championships in Kuwait City. His achievement at the 2007 World Judo Championships in Rio de Janeiro earned him his entry to the 2008 Summer Olympics in Beijing. On 9 February 2008, the history repeated itself: for the second time in his career, Boqiev competed at the Paris Super World Cup and again finished 7th among 60 competitors.

Boqiev also regularly participates in various tournaments in Tajikistan and the countries of the Commonwealth of Independent States. In April 2007 he won the 7th Russian Open Tournament in Chelyabinsk.

On 23 February 2008 Boqiev contested at the 2008 Otto Super World Cup and resulted 3rd among 56 competitors. On 7–8 June 2008 Boqiev won the 2008 Tre Torri International Judo Tournament in Porto Sant'Elpшdio of Italy.

In August 2008 Boqiev won bronze at the Olympic Games in Beijing. This was Tajikistan's first ever Olympic medal. In the quarter-finals, Boqiev beat Si Rijigawa of China to progress to the semi-finals and secure a medal. He was defeated in the semis by the reigning World Champion, Wang Ki-chun of South Korea.

At the 2012 Summer Olympics, Boqiev finished in 7th, losing to Riki Nakaya in the quarter-finals, and to Ugo Legrand in the repechage.

== See also ==
- Men's Judo under 73kg at the 2008 Summer Olympics
- Judo at the Beijing 2008 Summer Olympics
- Kuwait City 2007 Asian Judo Championships
