= Kim Chol-su =

North Korean judoka (born 1982)

Personal information
- Born: 12 September 1982 (age 43)
- Occupation: Judoka
- Height: 173 cm (5 ft 8 in)

Korean name
- Hangul: 김철수
- RR: Gim Cheolsu
- MR: Kim Ch'ŏlsu

Sport
- Country: North Korea
- Sport: Judo
- Weight class: ‍–‍73 kg

Achievements and titles
- Olympic Games: 9th (2008)
- World Champ.: (silver) (2009)
- Asian Champ.: (gold) (2007)
Medal record
Men's judo
Representing North Korea
World Championships
Silver medal – second place	2009 Rotterdam	‍–‍73 kg
Asian Championships
Gold medal – first place	2007 Kuwait City	‍–‍73 kg
Bronze medal – third place	2009 Taipei	‍–‍73 kg
Bronze medal – third place	2011 Abu Dhabi	‍–‍73 kg
East Asian Games
Bronze medal – third place	2009 Hong Kong	‍–‍73 kg

Profile at external databases
- IJF: 5680
- JudoInside.com: 43003
- Updated on 13 August 2023

Kim Chol-su (born 12 September 1982) is a North Korean judoka.

Kim finished in joint fifth place in the lightweight division (73 kg) at the 2006 Asian Games, having lost to Rasul Boqiev of Tajikistan in the bronze medal match. At the 2009 East Asian Games Kim won a bronze medal.

He also competed for North Korea at the 2008 Summer Olympics in the men's 73 kg event.

As of 2006, Kim resided in Pyongyang.
