= Aidar Kabimollayev =

Kazakhstani judoka (born 1983)

Medal record

Men's Judo

Representing Kazakhstan

Asian Championships
Silver medal – second place	2005 Tashkent	-73 kg

Aidar Kabimollayev (born 26 January 1983) is a Kazakh judoka. He finished in joint fifth place in the lightweight (73 kg) division at the 2006 Asian Games, having lost to Shokir Muminov of Uzbekistan in the bronze medal match.

He currently resides in Semei.
