= Zeyad Mater =

Yemeni judoka (born 1991)

Zeyad Mater (born December 18, 1991) is a Yemeni judoka. He competed at the 2016 Summer Olympics in the men's 73 kg event, in which he was eliminated in the second round by Victor Scvortov. He was the flag bearer for Yemen at the Parade of Nations.
