= Khashbaataryn Tsagaanbaatar =

Mongolian judoka (born 1984)

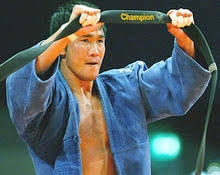
- Khashbaataryn Tsagaanbaatar at the 2009 World Judo Championships

Personal information
- Native name: Хашбаатарын Цагаанбаатар
- Born: 19 March 1984 (age 42) Baruunturuun, Mongolia
- Occupation: Judoka
- Height: 1.72 m (5 ft 8 in)

Sport
- Country: Mongolia
- Sport: Judo, sambo
- Weight class: ‍–‍60 kg, ‍–‍66 kg, ‍–‍73 kg

Achievements and titles
- Olympic Games: (bronze) (2004)
- World Champ.: (gold) (2009)
- Asian Champ.: (gold) (2003, 2005, 2006)
- National finals: (gold) (2005, 2011)
Medal record
Representing Mongolia
Men's judo
Olympic Games
Bronze medal – third place	2004 Athens	‍–‍60 kg
World Championships
Gold medal – first place	2009 Rotterdam	‍–‍66 kg
Bronze medal – third place	2010 Tokyo	‍–‍66 kg
Bronze medal – third place	2015 Astana	Men's team
Asian Games
Gold medal – first place	2006 Doha	‍–‍66 kg
Asian Championships
Gold medal – first place	2003 Jeju	‍–‍60 kg
Gold medal – first place	2005 Tashkent	‍–‍66 kg
Silver medal – second place	2007 Kuwait City	‍–‍66 kg
Silver medal – second place	2008 Jeju	‍–‍66 kg
Silver medal – second place	2011 Abu Dhabi	‍–‍66 kg
Bronze medal – third place	2004 Almaty	‍–‍60 kg
World Masters
Gold medal – first place	2011 Baku	‍–‍66 kg
Silver medal – second place	2012 Almaty	‍–‍66 kg
Bronze medal – third place	2013 Tyumen	‍–‍73 kg
IJF Grand Slam
Gold medal – first place	2009 Moscow	‍–‍66 kg
Gold medal – first place	2013 Paris	‍–‍73 kg
Silver medal – second place	2009 Rio de Janeiro	‍–‍66 kg
Bronze medal – third place	2010 Paris	‍–‍66 kg
Bronze medal – third place	2010 Tokyo	‍–‍66 kg
Bronze medal – third place	2011 Tokyo	‍–‍66 kg
Bronze medal – third place	2012 Paris	‍–‍66 kg
Bronze medal – third place	2012 Tokyo	‍–‍73 kg
IJF Grand Prix
Gold medal – first place	2010 Düsseldorf	‍–‍66 kg
Silver medal – second place	2012 Düsseldorf	‍–‍66 kg
Silver medal – second place	2013 Ulaanbaatar	‍–‍73 kg
Silver medal – second place	2014 Tashkent	‍–‍73 kg
Silver medal – second place	2014 Ulaanbaatar	‍–‍73 kg
Silver medal – second place	2015 Zagreb	‍–‍73 kg
Bronze medal – third place	2011 Amsterdam	‍–‍66 kg
Bronze medal – third place	2013 Almaty	‍–‍73 kg
Bronze medal – third place	2013 Tashkent	‍–‍73 kg
Bronze medal – third place	2014 Astana	‍–‍73 kg
Bronze medal – third place	2014 Budapest	‍–‍73 kg
Asian Junior Championships
Bronze medal – third place	2003 Macau	‍–‍66 kg
Summer Universiade
Bronze medal – third place	2003 Jeju	‍–‍60 kg
East Asian Championships
Gold medal – first place	2006 Ulaanbaatar	‍–‍66 kg
Men's sambo
World Championships
Gold medal – first place	2005 Astana	‍–‍68 kg
Gold medal – first place	2009 Thessaloniki	‍–‍68 kg
Silver medal – second place	2013 Saint Petersburg	‍–‍74 kg
Bronze medal – third place	2003 Saint Petersburg	‍–‍62 kg

Profile at external databases
- IJF: 192
- JudoInside.com: 31201
- Updated on 30 May 2023

Khashbaataryn Tsagaanbaatar (Mongolian: Хашбаатарын Цагаанбаатар, born 19 March 1984) is the single medal winner from Mongolia at the 2004 Summer Olympics, where he won a bronze medal in judo at the men's ‍–‍60 kg event after beating Olympic champion Choi Min-ho by ippon. He became the first Mongolian to win a gold medal at the World Judo Championships, doing so in Rotterdam 2009 (according to the old rules of judo, where it is allowed to double and single leg takedowns, with the legs grabbed by the hands, similar to the freestyle wrestling).

Khashbaataryn also took gold medal in the 2006 Asian Games.

Khashbaataryn also won a gold medal at the 2007 New York Open in the ‍–‍66 kg weight division. He won with a traditional technique, the kata guruma (shoulder wheel).
