= Hong Kuk-hyon =

North Korean judoka (born 1990)

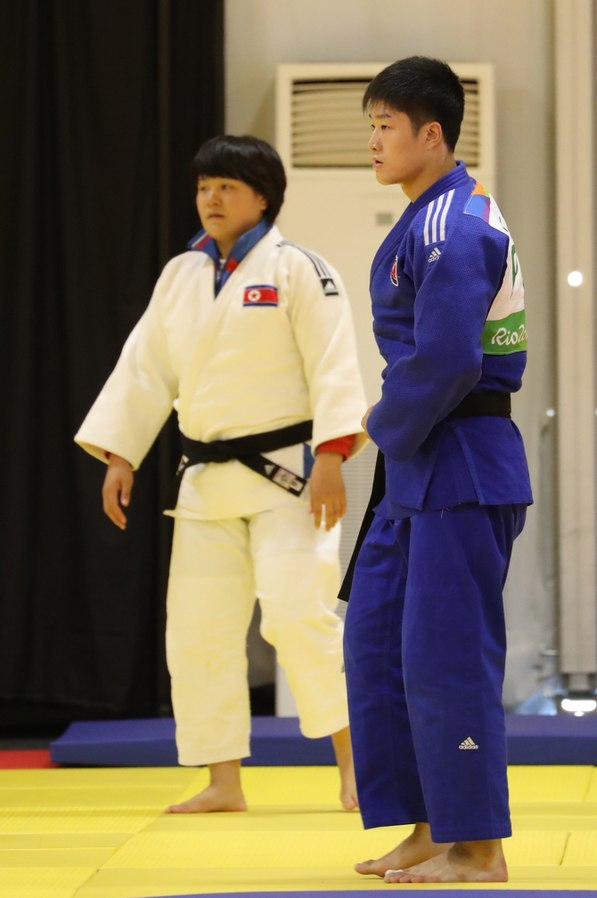
- Hong (in blue) training during the 2016 Olympics

Personal information
- Nationality: (North Korea) North Korean
- Born: 1 July 1990 (age 35)
- Home town: Pyongyang, North Korea
- Occupation: Judoka
- Height: 179 cm (5 ft 10 in)

Korean name
- Hangul: 홍국현
- RR: Hong Gukhyeon
- MR: Hong Kukhyŏn

Sport
- Country: North Korea
- Sport: Judo
- Weight class: –66 kg, –73 kg
- Rank: 2nd dan black belt
- Team: DPRK Judo National Team; Moranbong District Juvenile Sports School
- Coached by: Ri Kwang

Achievements and titles
- Olympic Games: R64 (2016)
- World Champ.: (silver) (2014)
- Asian Champ.: (gold) (2013)
Medal record
Men's judo
Representing North Korea
World Championships
| Silver medal – second place | 2014 Chelyabinsk | ‍–‍73 kg |
Asian Games
| Bronze medal – third place | 2010 Guangzhou | ‍–‍66 kg |
| Bronze medal – third place | 2014 Incheon | ‍–‍73 kg |
Asian Championships
| Gold medal – first place | 2013 Bangkok | ‍–‍73 kg |
IJF Grand Prix
| Gold medal – first place | 2014 Qingdao | ‍–‍73 kg |
| Bronze medal – third place | 2014 Ulaanbaatar | ‍–‍73 kg |
| Bronze medal – third place | 2015 Tashkent | ‍–‍73 kg |

Profile at external databases
- IJF: 5678
- JudoInside.com: 57487
- Updated on 4 July 2023

Hong Kuk-hyon (Korean: 홍국현; Korean pronunciation: [hoŋ.ɡu.kʰjʌn] or [hoŋ] [ku.kʰjʌn]; born 1 July 1990) is a North Korean judoka. He was Asian champion in 2013. He also won the silver medal at the 2014 World Championships.

In the IJF World Tour, Hong has won a gold in the 2014 Qingdao Grand Prix, and bronzes in the 2014 Ulaanbaatar and 2015 Tashkent Grands Prix.

== Career ==
=== Beginnings: 2009 – 2012 ===
Hong began his international judo career at half-lightweight (-66 kg). His first tournament was at the World Cup Bucharest in 2009. He won his first fight by yuko, then lost in his second fight to Poland's Pawel Zagrodnik by two yukos, despite scoring one. Hong then competed in his first Grand Prix in Qingdao, but lost in golden score to Liu Renwang in the Round of 16.

Hong had a breakthrough in his career when he won a bronze medal at the 2010 Asian Games in Guangzhou. He played ippon judo in his first three fights, but lost by ippon and yuko to Jumpei Morishita in the quarter-final. He then won the bronze medal against Islam Baialinov by yuko.

Hong next won his second international medal at the World Cup in Madrid. He played for ippon in the quarter-final and semi-final, however lost in the final by ippon and yuko against Deniss Kozlovs. His next tournament was at the World Cup in Ulaanbaatar. He defeated his first opponent by ippon and waza-ari, but lost in the quarter-final to An Jeong-hwan and in the repechage to Musashi Ugura, both by ippon.

Hong competed in his first continental championships in Abu Dhabi in 2011. He won in the Round of 16 by ippon, waza-ari and yuko, but lost by ippon in the quarter-final and repechage again. He then went on to fight in his first World Championships among a massive group of 128 judokas in the half-lightweight. He lost against Igor Soroca in his first fight that lasted over seven minutes before he was thrown for ippon.

Hong returned to the Grand Prix in Qingdao and lost in the quarter-final. In 2012, he competed at the Grand Prix in Düsseldorf but lost in his first fight. He then lost in his second fight at the Grand Prix in Prague, which was his final tournament at half-lightweight.

== Competitive Record ==
Judo Record
| Total | 77 |
| Wins | 51 |
| by Ippon | 28 |
| Losses | 26 |
| by Ippon | 16 |

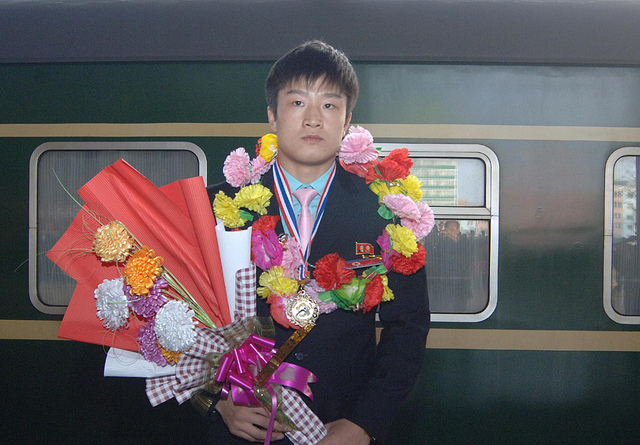
Hong receiving an award in Pyongyang, North Korea

(as of 6 August 2016)
