= Victor Scvortov =

United Arab Emirates judoka

Personal information
- Nationality: Emirati
- Born: 30 March 1988 (age 38)
- Occupation: Judoka

Sport
- Country: Moldova (2009–12); United Arab Emirates (since 2013)
- Sport: Judo
- Weight class: –73 kg

Achievements and titles
- Olympic Games: R16 (2016)
- World Champ.: (bronze) (2014)
- Asian Champ.: (bronze) (2018, 2019, 2021)
Medal record
Men's judo
Representing United Arab Emirates
World Championships
Bronze medal – third place	2014 Chelyabinsk	‍–‍73 kg
Asian Games
Bronze medal – third place	2018 Jakarta	‍–‍73 kg
Asian Championships
Bronze medal – third place	2019 Fujairah	‍–‍73 kg
Bronze medal – third place	2021 Bishkek	‍–‍73 kg
IJF Grand Slam
Silver medal – second place	2013 Baku	‍–‍73 kg
Bronze medal – third place	2014 Paris	‍–‍73 kg
Bronze medal – third place	2014 Baku	‍–‍73 kg
Bronze medal – third place	2016 Abu Dhabi	‍–‍73 kg
Bronze medal – third place	2021 Kazan	‍–‍73 kg
IJF Grand Prix
Gold medal – first place	2013 Abu Dhabi	‍–‍73 kg
Gold medal – first place	2014 Budapest	‍–‍73 kg
Silver medal – second place	2016 Havana	‍–‍73 kg
Silver medal – second place	2017 The Hague	‍–‍73 kg
Silver medal – second place	2019 Hohhot	‍–‍73 kg
Silver medal – second place	2019 Montreal	‍–‍73 kg
Bronze medal – third place	2013 Ulaanbaatar	‍–‍73 kg
Bronze medal – third place	2013 Tashkent	‍–‍73 kg
Bronze medal – third place	2013 Qingdao	‍–‍73 kg
Bronze medal – third place	2015 Samsun	‍–‍73 kg
Bronze medal – third place	2018 Tashkent	‍–‍73 kg
Representing Moldova
European U23 Championships
Bronze medal – third place	2010 Sarajevo	‍–‍66 kg
European Cadet Championships
Silver medal – second place	2004 Rotterdam	‍–‍66 kg

Profile at external databases
- IJF: 12579, 17203
- JudoInside.com: 33790
- Updated on 4 July 2023

Victor Scvortov (born 30 March 1988) is a Moldovan-born Emirati judoka. He originally represented his birth nation in international events, but he moved to the United Arab Emirates along with two other Moldovan judoka in 2013. He competed at the 2016 Summer Olympics in the men's 73 kg event, in which he was eliminated in the third round by Shohei Ono.

He also competed in the men's 73 kg event at the 2020 Summer Olympics in Tokyo, Japan.
