= Benjamin Waterhouse (judoka) =

American Samoan judoka

Personal information
- Full name: Benjamin Waterhouse
- Nationality: American Samoan
- Born: 11 June 1985 (age 41)
- Height: 1.72 m (5 ft 7 1/2 in)
- Weight: 71 kg (157 lb)

Sport
- Country: American Samoa
- Sport: Judo
- Event: Men's 73 kg

Benjamin Waterhouse (born 11 June 1985) is an American Samoan judoka.

Waterhouse competed at the 2016 Summer Olympics in Rio de Janeiro, representing American Samoa in the men's 73 kg weight category, where he was eliminated by Chamara Repiyallage of Sri Lanka in the second round of competition losing 000-101.
