= 2010 World Judo Championships – Men's 60 kg =

Judo competition

Judo Men's 60 kg at the 2010 World Judo Championships
- Venue: Yoyogi National Gymnasium
- Location: Tokyo, Japan
- Date: 12 September 2010
- Competitors: 72 from 56 nations

Medalists
gold medal	Rishod Sobirov (1st title)	Uzbekistan
silver medal	Georgii Zantaraia	Ukraine
bronze medal	Arsen Galstyan	Russia
bronze medal	Hiroaki Hiraoka	Japan

Competition at external databases
- Links: IJF • JudoInside

The Men's -60 kg competition at the 2010 World Judo Championships was held at 12 September at the Yoyogi National Gymnasium in Tokyo, Japan. 72 competitors contested for the medals, being split in 4 Pools where the winner advanced to the medal round.

== Pool A ==
- Last 32 fights:
  - (Yemen) Ali Khousrof 100 vs. (Kyrgyzstan) Edil Bekkulov 000
  - (Italy) Elio Verde 100 vs. (South Africa) Lusanda Ngoma 000
  - (Nepal) Prashuram Tharu 000 vs. (Peru) Juan Postigos 100

First Round
(Uzbekistan) Rishod Sobirov	102
(Bulgaria) Yanislav Gerchev	000
(Macau) Wong Kin Wai	000
(South Korea) Jin-Min Jang	100
(Madagascar) Tahiana Rakotondralambo	000
(Tajikistan) Jamshed Khalilov	101
(Yemen) Ali Khousrof	101
(Vietnam) Ho Ngan Giang	000
(Italy) Elio Verde	001
(Mexico) Nabor Castillo	000
(Colombia) Dodanim Barboza	000
(Venezuela) Javier Guédez	100
(Ukraine) Anatolii Laskuta	000
(United Kingdom) Ashley McKenzie	100
(Hungary) László Burján	100
(Peru) Juan Postigos	000

Quarterfinals
(Uzbekistan) Rishod Sobirov	100
(South Korea) Jin-Min Jang	000
(Tajikistan) Jamshed Khalilov	000
(Yemen) Ali Khousrof	010
(Italy) Elio Verde	011
(Venezuela) Javier Guédez	001
(United Kingdom) Ashley McKenzie	000
(Hungary) László Burján	010

Semifinals
(Uzbekistan) Rishod Sobirov	010
(Yemen) Ali Khousrof	000
(Italy) Elio Verde	010
(Hungary) László Burján	000

Final
(Uzbekistan) Rishod Sobirov	002
(Italy) Elio Verde	000

== Pool B ==
- Last 32 fights:
  - (India) Navjot Chana 100 vs. (Greece) Lavrentios Alexanidis 000
  - (Netherlands) Jeroen Mooren 010 vs. (United States) Aaron Kunihiro 000

First Round
(Japan) Masaaki Fukuoka	000
(Russia) Beslan Mudranov	100
(Djibouti) Houmed Moktar	000
(Morocco) Yassine Moudatir	100
(Panama) Damian Samudio	000
(India) Navjot Chana	111
(Armenia) Hovhannes Davtyan	101
(Hong Kong) Yu Kin Ting	000
(Netherlands) Jeroen Mooren	010
(Mongolia) Tumurkhuleg Davaadorj	000
(Georgia (country)) David Asumbani	100
(Kazakhstan) Bakytzhan Turebekov	000
(China) He Yunlong	023
(Moldova) Artiom Nacu	000
(Lithuania) Albert Techov	001
(Canada) Frazer Will	101

Quarterfinals
(Russia) Beslan Mudranov	021
(Morocco) Yassine Moudatir	000
(India) Navjot Chana	000
(Armenia) Hovhannes Davtyan	020
(Netherlands) Jeroen Mooren	000
(Georgia (country)) David Asumbani	100
(China) He Yunlong	000
(Canada) Frazer Will	001

Semifinals
(Russia) Beslan Mudranov	100
(Armenia) Hovhannes Davtyan	000
(Georgia (country)) David Asumbani	100
(Canada) Frazer Will	000

Final
(Russia) Beslan Mudranov	111
(Georgia (country)) David Asumbani	000

== Pool C ==
- Last 32 fights:
  - (United Kingdom) James Millar 000 vs. (Czech Republic) Pavel Petříkov 110
  - (El Salvador) Fredy Lopez 000 vs. (France) Sofiane Milous 101

First Round
(Japan) Hiroaki Hiraoka	100
(Vietnam) Huynh Nhat Thong	000
(Kazakhstan) Yerkebulan Kossayev	010
(Czech Republic) Pavel Petříkov	011
(Monaco) Yann Siccardi	000
(Finland) Valtteri Jokinen	010
(Mozambique) Neuso Sigauque	000
(Australia) Matthew Aquino	020
(Russia) Arsen Galstyan	002
(China) Yang Lishuan	000
(Kyrgyzstan) Abazbek Omurzakov	000
(United States) Nicholas Kossor	011
(Mongolia) Amartuvshin Dashdavaa	010
(Moldova) Octavian Nacu	000
(France) Sofiane Milous	110
(Germany) Tobias Englmaier	000

Quarterfinals
(Japan) Hiroaki Hiraoka	110
(Czech Republic) Pavel Petříkov	000
(Finland) Valtteri Jokinen	100
(Australia) Matthew Aquino	000
(Russia) Arsen Galstyan	002
(United States) Nicholas Kossor	000
(Mongolia) Amartuvshin Dashdavaa	011
(France) Sofiane Milous	100

Semifinals
(Japan) Hiroaki Hiraoka	100
(Finland) Valtteri Jokinen	000
(Russia) Arsen Galstyan	100
(France) Sofiane Milous	000

Final
(Japan) Hiroaki Hiraoka	000
(Russia) Arsen Galstyan	101

== Pool D ==
- Last 32 fight:
  - (Ukraine) Georgii Zantaraia 110 vs. (South Korea) Choi Min-Ho 011

First Round
(Ukraine) Georgii Zantaraia	100
(Thailand) Sarawut Petsing	000
(Solomon Islands) Tony Lomo	000
(Uzbekistan) Gabit Esimbetov	100
(Canada) Sergio Pessoa	010
(Ecuador) Jose Romero	000
(Chinese Taipei) Chang Hsuan-Hao	000
(Georgia (country)) Amiran Papinashvili	100
(Austria) Ludwig Paischer	110
(Turkmenistan) Kasym Populov	000
(Brazil) Felipe Kitadai	100
(Hong Kong) Chan Yat Hei	000
(Switzerland) Ludovic Chammartin	100
(Argentina) Jorge Peralta	000
(Costa Rica) Shigeru Onishi	000
(Saudi Arabia) Eisa Majrashi	100

Quarterfinals
(Ukraine) Georgii Zantaraia	001
(Uzbekistan) Gabit Esimbetov	000
(Canada) Sergio Pessoa	000
(Georgia (country)) Amiran Papinashvili	101
(Austria) Ludwig Paischer	101
(Brazil) Felipe Kitadai	000
(Switzerland) Ludovic Chammartin	100
(Saudi Arabia) Eisa Majrashi	000

Semifinals
(Ukraine) Georgii Zantaraia	100
(Georgia (country)) Amiran Papinashvili	001
(Austria) Ludwig Paischer	100
(Switzerland) Ludovic Chammartin	000

Final
(Ukraine) Georgii Zantaraia	100
(Austria) Ludwig Paischer	000

== Repechage ==
Repechage		Third place
(Italy) Elio Verde	101
(Georgia (country)) David Asumbani	001	(Italy) Elio Verde	000
		(Russia) Arsen Galstyan	100

Repechage		Third place
(Japan) Hiroaki Hiraoka	100
(Austria) Ludwig Paischer	000	(Japan) Hiroaki Hiraoka	100
		(Russia) Beslan Mudranov	000

== Finals ==
Semi-finals
(Uzbekistan) Rishod Sobirov	100
(Russia) Beslan Mudranov	000
(Russia) Arsen Galstyan	000
(Ukraine) Georgii Zantaraia	100

Final
(Uzbekistan) Rishod Sobirov	020
(Ukraine) Georgii Zantaraia	000
