= 2011 World Judo Championships – Men's 60 kg =

Judo competition

Judo Men's 60 kg at the 2011 World Judo Championships
- Venue: Accor Arena
- Location: Paris, France
- Date: 23 August 2011
- Competitors: 74 from 55 nations

Medalists
gold medal	Rishod Sobirov (2nd title)	Uzbekistan
silver medal	Hiroaki Hiraoka	Japan
bronze medal	Ilgar Mushkiyev	Azerbaijan
bronze medal	Georgii Zantaraia	Ukraine

Competition at external databases
- Links: IJF • JudoInside

The men's 60 kg competition of the 2011 World Judo Championships was held on August 23.

== Medalists ==
Gold	Silver	Bronze
Rishod Sobirov (UZB)	Hiroaki Hiraoka (JPN)	Ilgar Mushkiyev (AZE); Georgii Zantaraia (UKR)

== Results ==
=== Pool A ===
First round fights

	Score	
Pavel Petříkov (Czech Republic)	100–000	(Djibouti) Houmed Hagui
Yann Siccardi (Monaco)	001–002	(India) Navjot Chana

Second Round
(Uzbekistan) Rishod Sobirov	011
(Switzerland) Ludovic Chammartin	001
(Honduras) Kenny Godoy	000
(Burkina Faso) Hermann Zoungrana	110
(Canada) Frazer Will	110
(Georgia (country)) Betkili Shukvani	011
(Czech Republic) Pavel Petříkov	000
(Brazil) Felipe Kitadai	101
(France) Sofiane Milous	102
(Australia) Matthew Daquino	000
(India) Navjot Chana	100
(Moldova) Octavian Nacu	000
(Turkmenistan) Ahmet Babaniyazov	000
(Netherlands) Jeroen Mooren	100
(Bulgaria) Yanislav Gerchev	000
(Azerbaijan) Ilgar Mushkiyev	102

Quarterfinals
(Uzbekistan) Rishod Sobirov	111
(Burkina Faso) Hermann Zoungrana	000
(Canada) Frazer Will	000
(Brazil) Felipe Kitadai	011
(France) Sofiane Milous	101
(India) Navjot Chana	000
(Netherlands) Jeroen Mooren	000
(Azerbaijan) Ilgar Mushkiyev	110

Semifinals
(Uzbekistan) Rishod Sobirov	100
(Brazil) Felipe Kitadai	000
(France) Sofiane Milous	000
(Azerbaijan) Ilgar Mushkiyev	110

Final
(Uzbekistan) Rishod Sobirov	100
(Azerbaijan) Ilgar Mushkiyev	000

=== Pool B ===
First round fights

	Score	
Song Kang-ho (North Korea)	000–010	(United Kingdom) Ashley McKenzie
Peterson Meneus (Haiti)	000–100	(Niger) Amadou Zakari
Arsen Galstyan (Russia)	100–000	(Saudi Arabia) Eisa Majrashi

Second Round
(Japan) Hirofumi Yamamoto	110
(Mongolia) Tumurkhuleg Davaadorj	010
(Malta) Brent Law	000
(United Kingdom) Ashley McKenzie	101
(South Korea) Kim Won-Jin	002
(Ukraine) Denys Bilichenko	000
(Israel) Artiom Arshansky	101
(Niger) Amadou Zakari	000
(Russia) Arsen Galstyan	001
(China) He Yunlong	000
(United States) Nicholas Kossor	000
(Kazakhstan) Yerkebulan Kossayev	112
(Thailand) Sarawut Petsing	100
(Solomon Islands) Tony Lomo	000
(Venezuela) Javier Guédez	012
(Finland) Juho Reinvall	001

Quarterfinals
(Japan) Hirofumi Yamamoto	010
(United Kingdom) Ashley McKenzie	000
(South Korea) Kim Won-Jin	001
(Israel) Artiom Arshansky	000
(Russia) Arsen Galstyan	102
(Kazakhstan) Yerkebulan Kossayev	001
(Thailand) Sarawut Petsing	100
(Venezuela) Javier Guédez	000

Semifinals
(Japan) Hirofumi Yamamoto	000
(South Korea) Kim Won-Jin	100
(Russia) Arsen Galstyan	100
(Thailand) Sarawut Petsing	000

Final
(South Korea) Kim Won-Jin	100
(Russia) Arsen Galstyan	000

=== Pool C ===
First round fights

	Score	
Kim Kyong Jin (North Korea)	100–001	(Estonia) Elnur Alijev
Martin Messina (Cameroon)	000–100	(Australia) Arnie Dickins
Amiran Papinashvili (Georgia (country))	100–000	(Tajikistan) Jamshed Khalilov

Second Round
(Ukraine) Georgii Zantaraia	100
(North Korea) Yu Kin Ting	000
(South Korea) Kim Kyong Jin	110
(Cuba) Antonio Betancourt	000
(Greece) Manolis Savvidis	000
(United Kingdom) James Millar	001
(Germany) Tobias Englmaier	100
(Australia) Arnie Dickins	000
(Georgia (country)) Amiran Papinashvili	000
(Uzbekistan) Gabit Esimbetov	100
(Sierra Leone) Mohamed Sesay	000
(South Korea) Choi Gwang-Hyeon	112
(Turkmenistan) Gadam Saparniyazov	010
(United States) Aaron Kunihiro	100
(Peru) Juan Postigos	010
(Finland) Valtteri Jokinen	100

Quarterfinals
(Ukraine) Georgii Zantaraia	110
(South Korea) Kim Kyong Jin	000
(United Kingdom) James Millar	001
(Germany) Tobias Englmaier	000
(Uzbekistan) Gabit Esimbetov	000
(South Korea) Choi Gwang-Hyeon	111
(United States) Aaron Kunihiro	100
(Finland) Valtteri Jokinen	000

Semifinals
(Ukraine) Georgii Zantaraia	100
(United Kingdom) James Millar	000
(South Korea) Choi Gwang-Hyeon	011
(United States) Aaron Kunihiro	000

Final
(Ukraine) Georgii Zantaraia	000
(South Korea) Choi Gwang-Hyeon	001

=== Pool D ===
First round fights

	Score	
Jose Romero (Ecuador)	100–000	(Nigeria) Eniafe Solomon
László Burján (Hungary)	000–100	(Switzerland) Michael Iten
Yeldos Smetov (Kazakhstan)	011–012	(Armenia) Hovhannes Davtyan

Second Round
(Japan) Hiroaki Hiraoka	110
(Ecuador) Jose Romero	000
(Morocco) Yassine Moudatir	101
(Mozambique) Neuso Sigauque	000
(France) Issam Nour	101
(Mongolia) Boldbaatar Chimed-Yondon	001
(Latvia) Andrejs Magers	001
(Switzerland) Michael Iten	000
(Russia) Beslan Mudranov	102
(Mexico) Nabor Castillo	000
(Azerbaijan) Nijat Shikhalizade	000
(Austria) Ludwig Paischer	100
(Armenia) Hovhannes Davtyan	100
(Djibouti) Houmed Moktar	000
(China) Yang Lishuan	100
(Nepal) Saroj Maharjan	000

Quarterfinals
(Japan) Hiroaki Hiraoka	101
(Morocco) Yassine Moudatir	000
(France) Issam Nour	103
(Latvia) Andrejs Magers	000
(Russia) Beslan Mudranov	101
(Austria) Ludwig Paischer	010
(Armenia) Hovhannes Davtyan	110
(China) Yang Lishuan	000

Semifinals
(Japan) Hiroaki Hiraoka	100
(France) Issam Nour	000
(Russia) Beslan Mudranov	000
(Armenia) Hovhannes Davtyan	100

Final
(Japan) Hiroaki Hiraoka	110
(Armenia) Hovhannes Davtyan	000

=== Repechage ===
Repechage		Third place
(Azerbaijan) Ilgar Mushkiyev	100
(Russia) Arsen Galstyan	000	(Azerbaijan) Ilgar Mushkiyev	100
		(South Korea) Choi Gwang-Hyeon	000

Repechage		Third place
(Ukraine) Georgii Zantaraia	101
(Armenia) Hovhannes Davtyan	000	(Ukraine) Georgii Zantaraia	100
		(South Korea) Kim Won-Jin	000

=== Finals ===
Semi-finals
(Uzbekistan) Rishod Sobirov	011
(South Korea) Kim Won-Jin	010
(South Korea) Choi Gwang-Hyeon	000
(Japan) Hiroaki Hiraoka	100

Final
(Uzbekistan) Rishod Sobirov	010
(Japan) Hiroaki Hiraoka	000
