= Ghana at the 2014 Commonwealth Games =

- CG code: GHA
- CGA: Ghana Olympic Committee

in Glasgow, Scotland
- Flag bearer: Janet Amponsah
- Medals Ranked =33rd: Gold 0 Silver 0 Bronze 2 Total 2

Commonwealth Games appearances (overview)
- 1954; 1958; 1962; 1966; 1970; 1974; 1978; 1982; 1986; 1990; 1994; 1998; 2002; 2006; 2010; 2014; 2018; 2022; 2026; 2030

Ghana competed in the 2014 Commonwealth Games in Glasgow, Scotland from 23 July – 3 August 2014.

== Medalists ==
Medal	Name	Sport	Event	Date
Bronze	Razak Abugiri	Judo	Men's 60 kg	July 24
Bronze	Abdul Omar	Boxing	Men's Flyweight	Aug 1

== Athletics ==
Men
Track & road events

Athlete	Event	Heat		Semifinal		Final	
Athlete	Event	Result	Rank	Result	Rank	Result	Rank
Timothy Abeyie	100 m	10.50	3	did not advance			
Solomon Afful	100 m	10.66	5	did not advance			
Tim Abeyie	200 m	21.12	4	did not advance			
Solomon Afful	200 m	21.04 PB	4	did not advance			
Emmanuel Dasor	200 m	21.06	3	did not advance			
Kwadwo Acheampong	400 m	47.72	5	did not advance			
Daniel Gyasi	400 m	47.07	5	did not advance			
John O'Brien	400 m	did not finish		did not advance			
Felix Acheampong	1500 m (T54)	3:33.90 SB	4 q	—N/a		3:33.40 PB	8
Emmanuel Boateng	1500 m (T54)	3:44.44 PB	6	—N/a		did not advance	
Patrick Obeng	1500 m (T54)	3:48.11	6	—N/a		did not advance	
Daniel Gyasi; Solomon Afful; Kwadwo Achempong; Emmanuel Dasor	4 x 400 metres relay	Disqualified		—N/a		did not advance	
Mohammed Kassim	Marathon	—N/a				2:33:37	23

Field Events

Athlete	Event	Qualification		Final	
Athlete	Event	Distance	Rank	Distance	Rank
John Ampomah	Javelin throw	73.85	10 q	69.56	9

Combined events – Decathlon

Athlete	Event	100 m	LJ	SP	HJ	400 m	110H	DT	PV	JT	1500 m	Final	Rank
Brent Newdick	Result	11.18	7.22	13.96	1.93	52.87	15.47	42.58	DNS	DNS	DNS	DNF	15
Brent Newdick	Points	817	753	709	740	687	794	717	0	0	0	DNF	15

Women
Track & road events

Athlete	Event	Heat		Semifinal		Final	
Athlete	Event	Result	Rank	Result	Rank	Result	Rank
Flings Owusu-Agyapong	100 m	11.68	4 q	11.55	5	did not advance	
Gemma Acheampong	200 m	24.90	5	did not advance			
Doreen Agyei	200 m	25.27	5	did not advance			
Janet Amponsah	200 m	24.05	2 Q	DQ	8	did not advance	
Shawkia Iddrisu	400 m	55.74	5	did not advance			
Vivian Mills	400 m	55.19	5	did not advance			
Martha Bissah	800 m	2:10.95	8	did not advance			
Anita Fordjour	1500 m (T54)	4:21.24 SB	5 q	—N/a		4:11.29 PB	8
Bernice Frimpong	1500 m (T54)	4:21.58 PB	6	—N/a		did not advance	
Ajara Mohammed	1500 m (T54)	4:05.04 PB	4 q	—N/a		4:30.99	10
Juliana Sakat	5000 metres	—N/a				18:04.61	16
Rashidatu Abubakar	400 metres hurdles	1:00.94 PB	6	—N/a		did not advance	
Flings Owusu-Agyapong; Gemma Acheampong; Beatrice Gyaman; Doreen Agyei	4 x 100 metres relay	Disqualified		—N/a		did not advance	

Field Events

Athlete	Event	Qualification		Final	
Athlete	Event	Distance	Position	Distance	Position
Mathilde Boateng	Triple jump	13.07	12 q	13.00	9
Nadia Eke	Triple jump	13.14 NR	11 q	12.98	10
Naya Owusu	High jump	1.71	=18	did not advance	
Julia Agawu	Discus throw	41.79	16	did not advance	
Zuta Mary Nartey	Javelin throw	—N/a		48.23	11

Key

- Note–Ranks given for track events are within the athlete's heat only
- Q = Qualified for the next round
- q = Qualified for the next round as a fastest loser or, in field events, by position without achieving the qualifying target
- NR = National record
- N/A = Round not applicable for the event

== Badminton ==
Mixed team

Pool B

Pos	Team	Pld	W	L	GF	GA	GD	PF	PA	PD	Pts	Qualification
1	India	3	3	0	30	0	+30	630	195	+435	3	Quarterfinals
2	Ghana	3	2	1	12	19	−7	457	586	−129	2	
3	Uganda	3	1	2	11	21	−10	473	593	−120	1	
4	Kenya	3	0	3	9	22	−13	414	600	−186	0	

Source: glasgow2014.com

India
5
Commonwealth Arena, Glasgow
24 July

Ghana
0

			1	2	3
1	(India) (Ghana)	Kashyap Parupalli; Daniel Sam	21; 6	21; 16
2	(India) (Ghana)	P. V. Sindhu; Stella Amasha	21; 7	21; 5
3	(India) (Ghana)	Akshay Dewalkar / Pranav Chopra; Emmanuel Donkor / Abraham Ayittey	21; 7	21; 11
4	(India) (Ghana)	Jwala Gutta / Ashwini Ponnappa; Diana Archer / Evelyn Botwe	21; 4	21; 10
5	(India) (Ghana)	Srikanth Kidambi / P. C. Thulasi; Daniel Sam / Stella Amasha	21; 5	21; 9

Kenya
2
Commonwealth Arena, Glasgow
24 July

Ghana
3

			1	2	3
1	(Kenya) (Ghana)	Victor Odera Munga / Lavina Sabastian Martins; Daniel Sam / Stella Amasah	17; 21	15; 21
2	(Kenya) (Ghana)	Joseph Matheri Githitu; Emmanuel Donkor	12; 21	14; 21
3	(Kenya) (Ghana)	Mercy Mwethya Joseph; Evelyn Botwe	21; 11	21; 10
4	(Kenya) (Ghana)	Patrick Kinyua Mbogo / Victor Odera Munga; Daniel Sam / Emmanuel Donkor	14; 21	15; 21
5	(Kenya) (Ghana)	Mercy Mwethya Joseph / Lavina Sabastian Martins; Stella Amasah / Evelyn Botwe	21; 17	21; 16

Uganda
2
Commonwealth Arena, Glasgow
25 July

Ghana
3

			1	2	3
1	(Uganda) (Ghana)	Wilson Tukire / Margaret Nankabirwa; Daniel Sam / Stella Amasah	16; 21	12; 21
2	(Uganda) (Ghana)	Edwin Ekiring; Emmanuel Donkor	21; 14	21; 15
3	(Uganda) (Ghana)	Daisy Nakalyango; Evelyn Botwe	21; 8	21; 14
4	(Uganda) (Ghana)	Edwin Ekiring / Wilson Tukire; Daniel Sam / Emmanuel Donkor	17; 21	14; 21
5	(Uganda) (Ghana)	Daisy Nakalyango / Margaret Nankabirwa; Evelyn Botwe / Stella Amasah	21; 15	17; 21	24; 26

== Cycling ==
=== Track ===
Sprint

Athlete	Event	Qualification		Round 1	Repechage	Quarterfinals	Semifinals	Final	
Athlete	Event	Time Speed (km/h)	Rank	Opposition Time Speed (km/h)	Opposition Time Speed (km/h)	Opposition Time	Opposition Time	Opposition Time	Rank
Jedidiah Amoako-Ackah	Men's sprint	12.678; 56.791	26	did not advance					

Time trial

Athlete	Event	Time	Rank
Jedidiah Amoako-Ackah	Men's time trial	did not start	

Keirin

Athlete	Event	Round 1	Repechage	Semifinals	Final
Athlete	Event	Rank	Rank	Rank	Rank
Jedidiah Amoako-Ackah	Men's keirin	7 R	5	did not advance	

== Judo ==
Men

Athlete	Event	Round of 32	Round of 16	Quarterfinals	Semifinals	Repechage	Final / BM	
Athlete	Event	Opposition Result	Opposition Result	Opposition Result	Opposition Result	Opposition Result	Opposition Result	Rank
Dominic Agudoo	−60 kg	—N/a	Tsala Tsala (CMR); W 0002-0003	Sigauque (MOZ); L 0004-0002	Did not advance	Buchanan (SCO); L 0001–1000	Did not advance	7
Razak Abugiri	−60 kg	—N/a	Tony Lomo (SOL); W 1000-0001	Le Grange (RSA); L 0002-0000	Did not advance	Dodge (WAL); W 0122-0002	Sigauque (MOZ); W 1100-0001	3rd place, bronze medalist(s)
Alex Amoako	−66 kg	Krassas (CYP); L 0003-0001	did not advance					
Emmanuel Nartey	−73 kg	Bye	Madeira (MOZ); W 0003-0002	Leat (NZL); L 0003-1000	Did not advance	Dawson (SCO); L 0102-0101	Did not advance	7
Abubakar Alhassan	−81 kg	Messi (CMR); L 0001-1010	did not advance					
Victor Ahiavor	−90 kg	Ombiongno (CMR); L 0004-1001	did not advance					
Raymond Normeshie	−100 kg	Pathania (IND); L 0000-1000	did not advance					

Women

Athlete	Event	Round of 16	Quarterfinal	Semifinal	Repechage	Final / BM	
Athlete	Event	Opposition Result	Opposition Result	Opposition Result	Opposition Result	Opposition Result	Rank
Szandra Szogedi	−63 kg	Yeats-Brown (ENG); L 0001-0102	did not advance				

== Swimming ==
Men

Athlete	Event	Heat		Semifinal		Final	
Athlete	Event	Time	Rank	Time	Rank	Time	Rank
Kwaku Addo	50 m freestyle	25.72	46	did not advance			
Nana Antwi	50 m freestyle	27.12	61	did not advance			
Abbiw Jackson	50 m freestyle	26.25	55	did not advance			
Nana Antwi	100 m freestyle	did not start		did not advance			
Abbiw Jackson	100 m freestyle	56.87	46	did not advance			
Abeiku Jackson	100 m freestyle	56.47	44	did not advance			
Nana Antwi	50 m backstroke	33.63	37	did not advance			
Kwaku Addo	50 m butterfly	27.80	39	did not advance			
Abeiku Jackson	50 m butterfly	27.21	33	did not advance			
Abeiku Jackson	100 m butterfly	1:01.40	31	did not advance			

Women

Athlete	Event	Heat		Semifinal		Final	
Athlete	Event	Time	Rank	Time	Rank	Time	Rank
Ophelia Swayne	50 m freestyle	29.09	44	did not advance			
Ophelia Swayne	50 m butterfly	29.66	31	did not advance			

== Triathlon ==
Athlete	Event	Swim (1.5 km)	Bike (40 km)	Run (10 km)	Total Time	Rank
Christopher Symonds	Men's	25:47	Lapped			

== Weightlifting ==
Men

Athlete	Event	Snatch	Clean & Jerk	Total	Rank
Daniel Darko	62 kg	89	108	197	17
Christian Amoah	77 kg	110	128	238	22
Nii Dodoo	77 kg	101	145	246	19
Prince Nyarko	85 kg	112	145	257	16
Nii Larkyne	94 kg	107	138	245	11

Women

Athlete	Event	Snatch	Clean & Jerk	Total	Rank
Ruth Baffoe	53 kg	71	82	153	10
Dora Abotsi	75 kg	88	104	192	6
Alberta Ampomah	+75 kg	74	101	175	12

Powerlifting

Athlete	Event	Total	Rank
Charles Teye	Men's 72 kg	137.1	10
