= Armenia at the 2012 Summer Olympics =

- IOC code: ARM
- NOC: National Olympic Committee of Armenia
- Website: www.armnoc.am (in Armenian)

in London
- Competitors: 25 in 9 sports
- Flag bearers: Arman Yeremyan (opening); Arsen Julfalakyan (closing)
- Medals Ranked 60th: Gold 0 Silver 1 Bronze 1 Total 2

Summer Olympics appearances (overview)
- 1996; 2000; 2004; 2008; 2012; 2016; 2020; 2024

Other related appearances
- Russian Empire (1900–1912); Soviet Union (1952–1988); Unified Team (1992)

Armenia competed at the 2012 Summer Olympics in London, United Kingdom from 27 July to 12 August 2012. This was the nation's fifth consecutive appearance at the Olympics in the post-Soviet era.

The Armenian Olympic Committee sent a total of 25 athletes to the Games, 21 men and 4 women, to compete in 9 sports. The nation's team roughly shared the same size with Beijing and Sydney, only by the number difference between men and women. Armenia also marked its Olympic debut in taekwondo, competed by Arman Yeremyan, who was also the nation's flag bearer at the opening ceremony.

Armenia left London with one silver and one bronze medals.

== Medalists ==
Medal	Name	Sport	Event	Date
Silver	Arsen Julfalakyan	Wrestling	Men's Greco-Roman 74 kg	5 August
Bronze	Artur Aleksanyan	Wrestling	Men's Greco-Roman 96 kg	7 August

== Athletics ==
Key

- Note – Ranks given for track events are within the athlete's heat only
- Q = Qualified for the next round
- q = Qualified for the next round as a fastest loser or, in field events, by position without achieving the qualifying target
- NR = National record
- N/A = Round not applicable for the event
- Bye = Athlete not required to compete in round

Men

Athlete	Event	Qualification		Final	
Athlete	Event	Distance	Position	Distance	Position
Melik Janoyan	Javelin throw	72.64	39	did not advance	
Vardan Pahlevanyan	Long jump	6.55	40	did not advance	
Arsen Sargsyan	Long jump	7.62	25	did not advance	

Women

Athlete	Event	Qualification		Final	
Athlete	Event	Distance	Position	Distance	Position
Kristine Harutyunyan	Javelin throw	47.65	38	did not advance	

== Boxing ==
Men

Athlete	Event	Round of 32	Round of 16	Quarterfinals	Semifinals	Final	
Athlete	Event	Opposition Result	Opposition Result	Opposition Result	Opposition Result	Opposition Result	Rank
Andranik Hakobyan	Middleweight	Gausha (USA); L RSC (12–13)	did not advance				

== Gymnastics ==
=== Artistic ===
Men

Athlete	Event	Qualification								Final							
Athlete	Event	Apparatus						Total	Rank	Apparatus						Total	Rank
Athlete	Event	F	PH	R	V	PB	HB	Total	Rank	F	PH	R	V	PB	HB	Total	Rank
Artur Davtyan	All-around	13.800	13.900	13.400	14.833	14.233	13.366	82.865	36	did not advance							

== Judo ==
Athlete	Event	Round of 64	Round of 32	Round of 16	Quarterfinals	Semifinals	Repechage	Final / BM	
Athlete	Event	Opposition Result	Opposition Result	Opposition Result	Opposition Result	Opposition Result	Opposition Result	Opposition Result	Rank
Hovhannes Davtyan	Men's −60 kg	Englmaier (GER); W 1011–0002	Mushkiyev (AZE); W 0101–0000	Kossayev (KAZ); W 0100–0000	Verde (ITA); L 0000–0001	Did not advance	Milous (FRA); L 0002–0010	Did not advance	7
Armen Nazaryan	Men's −66 kg	Bye	Ovinou (PNG); W 0100–0000	Zagrodnik (POL); L 0102–0111	did not advance				

== Shooting ==
Men

Athlete	Event	Qualification		Final	
Athlete	Event	Points	Rank	Points	Rank
Norayr Bakhtamyan	10 m air pistol	579	16	did not advance	
Norayr Bakhtamyan	50 m pistol	557	18	did not advance	

== Swimming ==
Men

Athlete	Event	Heat		Semifinal		Final	
Athlete	Event	Time	Rank	Time	Rank	Time	Rank
Mikael Koloyan	100 m freestyle	53.82	45	did not advance			

Women

Athlete	Event	Heat		Semifinal		Final	
Athlete	Event	Time	Rank	Time	Rank	Time	Rank
Anahit Barseghyan	100 m backstroke	1:08.19	44	did not advance			

== Taekwondo ==
Athlete	Event	Round of 16	Quarterfinals	Semifinals	Repechage	Bronze Medal	Final	
Athlete	Event	Opposition Result	Opposition Result	Opposition Result	Opposition Result	Opposition Result	Opposition Result	Rank
Arman Yeremyan	Men's −80 kg	Michaud (CAN); W 8–4	Mollet (NED); W 6–4	Crismanich (ARG); L 1–2	Bye	Muhammad (GBR); L 3–9	Did not advance	5

== Weightlifting ==
Men

Athlete	Event	Snatch		Clean & Jerk		Total	Rank
Athlete	Event	Result	Rank	Result	Rank	Total	Rank
Arakel Mirzoyan	−69 kg	148	6	~~177~~	DNF	148	DNF
Tigran Gevorg Martirosyan	−77 kg	Withdrew due to injury					
Ara Khachatryan	−85 kg	~~165~~	DNF	—	—	—	DNF
Norayr Vardanyan	–94 kg	170	9	210	8	380	11

Women

Athlete	Event	Snatch		Clean & Jerk		Total	Rank
Athlete	Event	Result	Rank	Result	Rank	Total	Rank
Meline Daluzyan	−69 kg	111	6	~~140~~	DNF	111	DNF
Hripsime Khurshudyan	+75 kg	~~128~~	~~4~~	~~166~~	~~3~~	~~294~~	DSQ

== Wrestling ==
Key

- VT - Victory by Fall.
- PP - Decision by Points - the loser with technical points.
- PO - Decision by Points - the loser without technical points.

Men's freestyle

Athlete	Event	Qualification	Round of 16	Quarterfinal	Semifinal	Repechage 1	Repechage 2	Final / BM	
Athlete	Event	Opposition Result	Opposition Result	Opposition Result	Opposition Result	Opposition Result	Opposition Result	Opposition Result	Rank
Mihran Jaburyan	−55 kg	Bye	Escobar (HON); W 3–1 ^{PP}	S Yumoto (JPN); L 1–3 ^{PP}	did not advance				7
David Safaryan	−66 kg	Bye	Omar (EGY); W 5–0 ^{VB}	Tanatarov (KAZ); L 1–3 ^{PP}	did not advance				8
Gadzhimurad Nurmagomedov	−84 kg	Abdusalomov (TJK); W 3–1 ^{PP}	Lashgari (IRI); L 0–5 ^{EX}	did not advance					11

Men's Greco-Roman

Athlete	Event	Qualification	Round of 16	Quarterfinal	Semifinal	Repechage 1	Repechage 2	Final / BM	
Athlete	Event	Opposition Result	Opposition Result	Opposition Result	Opposition Result	Opposition Result	Opposition Result	Opposition Result	Rank
Hovhannes Varderesyan	−66 kg	Kim H-W (KOR); L 0–3 ^{PO}	did not advance			Mulens (CUB); L 0–3 ^{PO}	did not advance		19
Arsen Julfalakyan	−74 kg	Bye	Kobonov (KGZ); W 3–0 ^{PO}	Kikiniou (BLR); W 3–0 ^{PO}	Ahmadov (AZE); W 3–0 ^{PO}	Bye		Vlasov (RUS); L 0–3 ^{PO}	2nd place, silver medalist(s)
Artur Aleksanyan	−96 kg	Timoncini (ITA); W 3–0 ^{PO}	Rezaei (IRI); L 0–3 ^{PO}	did not advance		Bye	Ildem (TUR); W 3–0 ^{PO}	Estrada (CUB); W 3–0 ^{PO}	3rd place, bronze medalist(s)
Yury Patrikeyev	−120 kg	Baroyev (RUS); W 3–1 ^{PP}	Babajanzadeh (IRI); L 1–3 ^{PP}	did not advance					8
