= Solomon Islands at the 2014 Commonwealth Games =

- Flag of the Solomon Islands
- CGF code: SOL
- CGA: National Olympic Committee of Solomon Islands
- Website: oceaniasport.com/solomon

in Glasgow, Scotland
- Competitors: 12 in 6 sports
- Flag bearer: Jenly Tegu Wini
- Medals: Gold 0 Silver 0 Bronze 0 Total 0

Commonwealth Games appearances (overview)
- 1982; 1986; 1990; 1994; 1998; 2002; 2006; 2010; 2014; 2018; 2022; 2026; 2030

Solomon Islands competed in the 2014 Commonwealth Games in Glasgow, Scotland from 23 July to 3 August 2014. Participating in their eighth Commonwealth Games, the Solomons have never yet won a medal.

== Athletics ==
Key

- Note–Ranks given for track events are within the athlete's heat only
- Q = Qualified for the next round
- q = Qualified for the next round as a fastest loser or, in field events, by position without achieving the qualifying target
- NR = National record
- N/A = Round not applicable for the event

Men
Track & road events

Athlete	Event	Heat		Semi-final		Final	
Athlete	Event	Result	Rank	Result	Rank	Result	Rank
Francis Manioru	100 m	11.87	72	Did not advance			
Rosefelo Siosi	5000 m	—N/a				16:55.33	24

Women
Track & road events

Athlete	Event	Final	
Athlete	Event	Result	Rank
Sharon Firisua	5000 m	18:45.18 NR	17

== Judo ==
Men

Athlete	Event	Round of 16	Quarterfinal	Semi-final	Repechage	Final / BM	Rank
Athlete	Event	Opposition Result	Opposition Result	Opposition Result	Opposition Result	Opposition Result	Rank
Tony Lomo	−60 kg	R Abugiri (GHA); L 0001-1000	Did not advance				

== Table Tennis ==
Singles

Athlete	Event	Group stage			Round of 64	Round of 32	Round of 16	Quarterfinals	Semi-finals	Final	Rank
Athlete	Event	Opposition Result	Opposition Result	Rank	Opposition Result	Opposition Result	Opposition Result	Opposition Result	Opposition Result	Opposition Result	Rank
Rob Dorovolomo	Men's Singles	Howieson (SCO); L 0 – 4	Freeman (SKN); W 4 – 1	2	Did not advance						

== Triathlon ==
Individual

Athlete	Event	Swim (1.5 km)	Trans 1	Bike (40 km)	Trans 2	Run (10 km)	Total Time	Rank
Jad Nalo	Men's	25:21	0:44	Lapped				
Stanley Ofasisili	Men's	26:46	0:52	Lapped				

== Weightlifting ==
Men

Athlete	Event	Snatch		Clean & jerk		Total	Rank
Athlete	Event	Result	Rank	Result	Rank	Total	Rank
Brown Ramohaka	−62 kg	100	18	135	15	235	15
David Gorosi	−85 kg	125	13	155	11	280	11

Women

Athlete	Event	Snatch		Clean & jerk		Total	Rank
Athlete	Event	Result	Rank	Result	Rank	Total	Rank
Jenly Tegu Wini	−58 kg	79	10	102	7	181	8
Hepline Iro	−63 kg	77	9	97	10	174	10

== Wrestling ==
Key:

- VT – Victory by Fall.
- PP – Decision by Points – the loser with technical points.
- PO – Decision by Points – the loser without technical points.

Men's freestyle

Athlete	Event	Round of 32	Round of 16	Quarterfinal	Semi-final	Repechage	Final / BM	Rank
Athlete	Event	Opposition Result	Opposition Result	Opposition Result	Opposition Result	Opposition Result	Opposition Result	Rank
Katea Tebitara	−74 kg	Bye	Q Abbas (PAK); L 0–4	Did not advance		D Galea (MLT); L 0–3	Did not advance	7
