= Judo at the 2010 Asian Games – Men's 60 kg =

Judo competition

Men's 60 kg at the 2010 Asian Games
- Venue: Huagong Gymnasium
- Date: 16 November 2010
- Competitors: 22 from 22 nations

Medalists
gold medal	Rishod Sobirov	Uzbekistan
silver medal	Hiroaki Hiraoka	Japan
bronze medal	A Lamusi	China
bronze medal	Choi Min-ho	South Korea

The men's 60 kilograms (Extra lightweight) judo competition at the 2010 Asian Games in Guangzhou was held on 16 November at the Huagong Gymnasium.

== Schedule ==
All times are China Standard Time (UTC+08:00)

Date	Time	Event
Tuesday, 16 November 2010	10:00	Preliminary 1
Tuesday, 16 November 2010	10:00	Preliminary 2
Tuesday, 16 November 2010	10:00	Quarterfinals
Tuesday, 16 November 2010	15:00	Final of repechage
Tuesday, 16 November 2010	15:00	Final of table
Tuesday, 16 November 2010	15:00	Finals

== Results ==
=== Main bracket ===
==== Final ====
Gold medal
Rishod Sobirov (UZB)	020
Hiroaki Hiraoka (JPN)	000

==== Top half ====
Preliminary 1
Rishod Sobirov (UZB)	100
Huỳnh Nhất Thống (VIE)	000
Navjot Chana (IND)	020
Yu Kin Ting (HKG)	000
Kim Kyong-jin (PRK)	001
Choi Min-ho (KOR)	011

Preliminary 2
Rishod Sobirov (UZB)	100
Wong Kin Wai (MAC)	000
Navjot Chana (IND)	110
Mohsen Ghaffar (IRI)	000
Choi Min-ho (KOR)	020
Mohammed Sarhan (PLE)	000
A Lamusi (CHN)	111
Ahmad Al-Dheyabi (IOC)	001

Quarterfinals
Rishod Sobirov (UZB)	020
Navjot Chana (IND)	000
Choi Min-ho (KOR)	100
A Lamusi (CHN)	000

Final of table
Rishod Sobirov (UZB)	011
Choi Min-ho (KOR)	001

==== Bottom half ====
Preliminary 1
Hiroaki Hiraoka (JPN)	101
Edil Bekkulov (KGZ)	000
Fadi Darwish (SYR)	103
Sarawut Petsing (THA)	000
Kasym Populow (TKM)	101
Chindavon Syvanevilay (LAO)	002

Preliminary 2
Hiroaki Hiraoka (JPN)	100
Fadi Darwish (SYR)	000
Ali Khousrof (YEM)	000
Eisa Majrashi (KSA)	001
Dashdavaagiin Amartüvshin (MGL)	101
Jamshed Khalilov (TJK)	010
Yerkebulan Kossayev (KAZ)	101
Kasym Populow (TKM)	000

Quarterfinals
Hiroaki Hiraoka (JPN)	000
Eisa Majrashi (KSA)	000
Dashdavaagiin Amartüvshin (MGL)	002
Yerkebulan Kossayev (KAZ)	000

Final of table
Hiroaki Hiraoka (JPN)	100
Dashdavaagiin Amartüvshin (MGL)	000

=== Repechage ===
Final of repechage
Navjot Chana (IND)	002
A Lamusi (CHN)	101
Eisa Majrashi (KSA)	002
Yerkebulan Kossayev (KAZ)	020

Bronze medals
A Lamusi (CHN)	101
Dashdavaagiin Amartüvshin (MGL)	000
Yerkebulan Kossayev (KAZ)	000
Choi Min-ho (KOR)	101
