= Zakari Gourouza =

Nigerien judoka (born 1982)

Personal information
- Born: 8 June 1982 (age 42)
- Occupation: Judoka

Sport
- Sport: Judo

Profile at external databases
- JudoInside.com: 84755

Zakari Gourouza (born 8 June 1982) is a Nigerien judoka from Dosso. He competes in the men's 60 kg category. At the 2012 Summer Olympics, he was defeated in the second round by Russian Arsen Galstyan, who would win gold in the event, having defeated Honduran Kenny Godoy in the first round. Zakari Gourouza was the first Nigerien athlete to compete in the 2012 London games.
