= Owen Livesey =

British judoka, submission wrestler, and MMA fighter

Personal information
- Born: 3 August 1991 (age 34) St Helens, England

Sport
- Sport: Judo, submission wrestling
- Event: Men's 81 kilograms
Medal record
Representing the United Kingdom and England
Judo
Commonwealth Games
Gold medal – first place	2014 Glasgow	Men's 81kg judo
Catch wrestling
Snake Pit World Championships
Gold medal – first place	2022 Bolton	100 kg

Owen Livesey (born 3 August 1991) is a British judoka, submission wrestler, and mixed martial artist. He competed in judo at an international level for Great Britain and England and won a gold medal at the 2014 Commonwealth Games in Glasgow in the men's 81kg judo. Livesey then transitioned to submission grappling and MMA, competing internationally. He won the heavyweight championship at The Snake Pit's 2022 Catch Wrestling World Championships.

== Personal history ==
Owen Livesey was born on 3 August 1991 in St Helens, Merseyside. Livesey has two sisters, named Bekky Livesey and Amy Livesey, both of whom participate in judo and have both won British championships at half-middleweight.

== Judo career ==
"It's good to beat someone from home, there's a bit of tension there because you know each other so well. I had a year out when I was 18 and didn't really care about judo. but I came back, got my head in and got the result. You get out what you put in. And I got out exactly what I put in".

— BBC quoting Livesey

Prior to becoming a judoka, Livesey was a participant in rugby league. He had hoped to be selected to represent Great Britain in judo at the 2012 Olympic Games held in London, but was not, a disappointment which made Livesey ponder his continuation of the sport. Livesey is a 2nd dan black belt in judo, gaining his 1st dan at the age of 16, and trained at SKK Judo Club where he was coached by Peter Blood and Luke Preston.

At the 2014 Commonwealth Games held in Glasgow, Scotland, Livesey defeated John Muthee of Kenya in the round of 16. The quarter-final was against Zambia's Boas Munyonga, and in the semi-finals Canadian Jonah Burt was beaten. The final was against compatriot Tom Reed, which Livesey won in a five-minute bout.

He is a three times champion of Great Britain, winning the half-middleweight division at the British Judo Championships in 2013, 2014, and 2017.

== Professional grappling career ==
=== 2021–2022 ===
Owen has found success in submission wrestling, first competing for Polaris Pro Grappling at Polaris 18 on 27 November 2021, defeating Max Bickerton on the preliminary card. He returned at the promotion's next event on 26 March 2022 to compete against Freddie Vosgrone. Livesey won a unanimous decision against Vosgrone on the main card. On 21 May 2022 Livesey competed won a unanimous decision against Michael Pixley at Grapplefest 12. He was then invited to return to Polaris to compete at Polaris 21 against ADCC veteran Josh Hinger on 24 September 2022.

At the 2022 Catch Wrestling World Championships hosted by The Snake Pit at the University of Bolton Stadium, Livesey won the heavyweight (-100kg) division. Shortly after, Livesey was announced as the official alternate for the 99 kg division at the 2022 ADCC World Championship. He was given the call to compete with around a week's notice, as Luccas Lira Costa was forced to withdraw due to visa issues. Livesey was eliminated in the opening round by the eventual champion, Kaynan Duarte. The following week, on 24 September 2022, Livesey defeated Josh Hinger by split decision at Polaris 21. Livesey competed in the Polaris Middleweight Grand Prix on 25 November 2022. He was submitted by Hunter Colvin in the opening round.

=== 2023–2024 ===
On 11 March 2023 Livesey was booked to compete against former UFC middleweight champion Chris Weidman in the main event of Polaris 23. He won the match by unanimous decision. Livesey was scheduled to compete at Quintet 4 on 10 September 2023 where represented Team Polaris. Livesey drew his only match against Nick Rodriguez and his team went out in the opening round. Livesey then competed in an 8-man absolute grand prix tournament at Polaris 25 on 30 September 2023. He went out in the opening round after losing a decision to Fabricio Andrey.

Livesey competed in a catch wrestling match against Josh Barnett at 2023 Catch Wrestling World Championships on October 28. He won the match by decision.

Livesey was due to compete against Yoel Romero in an openweight match at Polaris 28 on 15 June 2024. Romero had to withdraw from the match and was replaced by Baissangour Chamsoudinov, Livesey was originally declared the winner but the match was rescored as a draw.

Livesey competed in the over 80 kg division at the inaugural Craig Jones Invitational on 16–17 August 2024. He beat Mahamed Aly by decision in the opening round and was submitted by eventual winner Nick Rodriguez in the quarter-final.

== Mixed martial arts career ==
Livesey made his professional mixed martial arts debut in April 2021, beating Liam Gregory by TKO in the first round.
