= List of Solomon Islands records in Olympic weightlifting =

The following are the national records in Olympic weightlifting in the Solomon Islands. Records are maintained in each weight class for the snatch lift, clean and jerk lift, and the total for both lifts by the Solomon Islands Weightlifting Federation.

== Current records ==
=== Men ===
Event	Record	Athlete	Date	Meet	Place	Ref
60 kg
Snatch	90 kg	Guy Saeg	27 April 2026	Oceania Championships	Apia, Samoa	
Clean & Jerk	105 kg	Guy Saeg	27 April 2026	Oceania Championships	Apia, Samoa	
Total	195 kg	Guy Saeg	27 April 2026	Oceania Championships	Apia, Samoa	
65 kg
Snatch						
Clean & Jerk						
Total						
71 kg
Snatch	115 kg	Freeman Hale Aumalefu	28 April 2026	Oceania Championships	Apia, Samoa	
Clean & Jerk	140 kg	Freeman Hale Aumalefu	28 April 2026	Oceania Championships	Apia, Samoa	
Total	255 kg	Freeman Hale Aumalefu	28 April 2026	Oceania Championships	Apia, Samoa	
79 kg
Snatch						
Clean & Jerk						
Total						
88 kg
Snatch						
Clean & Jerk						
Total						
94 kg
Snatch						
Clean & Jerk						
Total						
110 kg
Snatch						
Clean & Jerk						
Total						
+110 kg
Snatch						
Clean & Jerk						
Total						

=== Women ===
Event	Record	Athlete	Date	Meet	Place	Ref
48 kg
Snatch						
Clean & Jerk						
Total						
53 kg
Snatch	75 kg	Jenly Tegu Wini	28 April 2026	Oceania Championships	Apia, Samoa	
Clean & Jerk	98 kg	Jenly Tegu Wini	27 July 2026	Commonwealth Games	Glasgow, United Kingdom	
Total	172 kg	Jenly Tegu Wini	27 July 2026	Commonwealth Games	Glasgow, United Kingdom	
58 kg
Snatch						
Clean & Jerk						
Total						
63 kg
Snatch	76 kg	Shirmara Wini	29 April 2026	Oceania Championships	Apia, Samoa	
Clean & Jerk	90 kg	Shirmara Wini	29 April 2026	Oceania Championships	Apia, Samoa	
Total	166 kg	Shirmara Wini	29 April 2026	Oceania Championships	Apia, Samoa	
69 kg
Snatch						
Clean & Jerk						
Total						
77 kg
Snatch						
Clean & Jerk						
Total						
86 kg
Snatch						
Clean & Jerk						
Total						
+86 kg
Snatch						
Clean & Jerk						
Total						

== Historical records ==
=== Men (2018–2025) ===
Event	Record	Athlete	Date	Meet	Place	Ref
55 kg
Snatch	91 kg	Philip Masi	20 June 2022	Pacific Mini Games	Saipan, Northern Mariana Islands	
Clean & Jerk	113 kg	Philip Masi	20 November 2023	Pacific Games	Honiara, Solomon Islands	
Total	203 kg	Philip Masi	20 November 2023	Pacific Games	Honiara, Solomon Islands	
61 kg
Snatch	102 kg	Ramohaka Brown	20 November 2023	Pacific Games	Honiara, Solomon Islands	
Clean & Jerk	132 kg	Ramohaka Brown	20 June 2022	Pacific Mini Games	Saipan, Northern Mariana Islands	
Total	229 kg	Ramohaka Brown	20 November 2023	Pacific Games	Honiara, Solomon Islands	
67 kg
Snatch	105 kg	Stan Donga	20 June 2022	Pacific Mini Games	Saipan, Northern Mariana Islands	
Clean & Jerk	133 kg	Stan Donga	21 November 2023	Pacific Games	Honiara, Solomon Islands	
Total	238 kg	Stan Donga	21 November 2023	Pacific Games	Honiara, Solomon Islands	
73 kg
Snatch						
Clean & Jerk						
Total						
81 kg
Snatch						
Clean & Jerk						
Total						
89 kg
Snatch						
Clean & Jerk						
Total						
96 kg
Snatch						
Clean & Jerk						
Total						
102 kg
Snatch						
Clean & Jerk						
Total						
109 kg
Snatch						
Clean & Jerk						
Total						
+109 kg
Snatch						
Clean & Jerk						
Total						

=== Women (2018–2025) ===
Event	Record	Athlete	Date	Meet	Place	Ref
45 kg
Snatch						
Clean & Jerk						
Total						
49 kg
Snatch	65 kg	Rowena Donga	20 November 2023	Pacific Games	Honiara, Solomon Islands	
Clean & Jerk	84 kg	Rowena Donga	20 November 2023	Pacific Games	Honiara, Solomon Islands	
Total	149 kg	Rowena Donga	20 November 2023	Pacific Games	Honiara, Solomon Islands	
55 kg
Snatch	84 kg	Jenly Tegu Wini	20 June 2022	Pacific Mini Games	Saipan, Northern Mariana Islands	
Clean & Jerk	110 kg	Jenly Tegu Wini	20 June 2022	Pacific Mini Games	Saipan, Northern Mariana Islands	
Total	194 kg	Jenly Tegu Wini	20 June 2022	Pacific Mini Games	Saipan, Northern Mariana Islands	
59 kg
Snatch	86 kg	Jenly Tegu Wini	15 December 2018	Pacific Cup	Le Mont-Dore, New Caledonia	
Clean & Jerk	114 kg	Jenly Tegu Wini	8 February 2019	EGAT Cup	Chiang Mai, Thailand	
Total	198 kg	Jenly Tegu Wini	15 December 2018	Pacific Cup	Le Mont-Dore, New Caledonia	
64 kg
Snatch	64 kg	Betty Waneasi	21 November 2023	Pacific Games	Honiara, Solomon Islands	
Clean & Jerk	84 kg	Betty Waneasi	21 November 2023	Pacific Games	Honiara, Solomon Islands	
Total	148 kg	Betty Waneasi	21 November 2023	Pacific Games	Honiara, Solomon Islands	
71 kg
Snatch						
Clean & Jerk						
Total						
76 kg
Snatch						
Clean & Jerk						
Total						
81 kg
Snatch						
Clean & Jerk						
Total						
87 kg
Snatch						
Clean & Jerk						
Total						
+87 kg
Snatch						
Clean & Jerk						
Total						

== Historical records ==
=== Men (1998–2018) ===
Event	Record	Athlete	Date	Meet	Place	Ref
56 kg
Snatch	80 kg	Walter Shradrack	5 December 2017	Pacific Mini Games	Port Vila, Vanuatu	
Clean & Jerk	93 kg	Walter Shradrack	5 December 2017	Pacific Mini Games	Port Vila, Vanuatu	
Total	173 kg	Walter Shradrack	5 December 2017	Pacific Mini Games	Port Vila, Vanuatu	
62 kg
Snatch	90 kg					
Clean & Jerk	120 kg					
Total	210 kg					
69 kg
Snatch	95 kg					
Clean & Jerk	105 kg					
Total	200 kg					
77 kg
Snatch						
Clean & Jerk						
Total						
85 kg
Snatch	125 kg	David Gorosi	28 July 2014	Commonwealth Games	Glasgow, United Kingdom	
Clean & Jerk	156 kg					
Total	280 kg	David Gorosi	28 July 2014	Commonwealth Games	Glasgow, United Kingdom	
94 kg
Snatch	100 kg	Oscar Taramae	7 December 2017	Pacific Mini Games	Port Vila, Vanuatu	
Clean & Jerk	131 kg	Oscar Taramae	7 December 2017	Pacific Mini Games	Port Vila, Vanuatu	
Total	231 kg	Oscar Taramae	7 December 2017	Pacific Mini Games	Port Vila, Vanuatu	
105 kg
Snatch						
Clean & Jerk						
Total						
+105 kg
Snatch						
Clean & Jerk						
Total			,			

=== Women (1998–2018) ===
Event	Record	Athlete	Date	Meet	Place	Ref
48 kg
Snatch	40 kg					
Clean & Jerk	45 kg					
Total	85 kg					
53 kg
Snatch	73 kg	Mary Kini Lifu	6 April 2018	Commonwealth Games	Gold Coast, Australia	
Clean & Jerk	93 kg	Mary Kini Lifu	6 April 2018	Commonwealth Games	Gold Coast, Australia	
Total	166 kg	Mary Kini Lifu	6 April 2018	Commonwealth Games	Gold Coast, Australia	
58 kg
Snatch	87 kg	Jenly Tegu Wini	24 May 2016	Oceania Championships	Suva, Fiji	
Clean & Jerk	108 kg	Jenly Tegu Wini	24 May 2016	Oceania Championships	Suva, Fiji	
Total	195 kg	Jenly Tegu Wini	24 May 2016	Oceania Championships	Suva, Fiji	
63 kg
Snatch	76 kg					
Clean & Jerk	113 kg	Jenly Tegu Wini	16 November 2013	Ian Laurie Cup	Melbourne, Australia	
Total	197 kg	Jenly Tegu Wini	16 November 2013		Melbourne, Australia	
69 kg
Snatch						
Clean & Jerk						
Total						
75 kg
Snatch						
Clean & Jerk						
Total						
+75 kg
Snatch	65 kg					
Clean & Jerk	75 kg					
Total	140 kg					
