= Judo at the 2014 Commonwealth Games – Men's 60 kg =

Judo competition

Judo Judo – Men's 60 kg at the 2014 Commonwealth Games
- Venue: Scottish Exhibition and Conference Centre
- Date: 24 July 2014
- Competitors: 15 from 14 nations

Medalists
gold medal	Ashley McKenzie	England
silver medal	Navjot Chana	India
bronze medal	Razak Abugiri	Ghana
bronze medal	John Buchanan	Scotland

The men's 60 kg Judo competitions at the 2014 Commonwealth Games in Glasgow, Scotland was held on 24 July at the Scottish Exhibition and Conference Centre. Judo returned to the program, after last being competed back in 2002.

== Results ==
=== Preliminaries ===
Round of 16
P Laurent (MRI)	0001
J Buchanan (SCO)	0200
N Sigauque (MOZ)	1000
W Kalunga (ZAM)
B Tsala Tsala (CMR)	0003
D Agudoo (GHA)	0002
T Pappas (AUS)	0000
N Chana (IND)	0023
C Trikomitis (CYP)	0000
B Dodge (WAL)	1011
D Le Grange (RSA)	w/o
A Magogo (TAN)
T Lomo (SOL)	0001
R Abugiri (GHA)	1000

Quarterfinals
A McKenzie (ENG)	0011
J Buchanan (SCO)	0002
N Sigauque (MOZ)	0002
D Agudoo (GHA)	0004
N Chana (IND)	1101
B Dodge (WAL)	0101
D Le Grange (RSA)	0000
R Abugiri (GHA)	0002

Semifinals
A McKenzie (ENG)	1000
N Sigauque (MOZ)	0001
N Chana (IND)	1000
D Le Grange (RSA)	0001

Gold medal match
A McKenzie (ENG)	0101
N Chana (IND)	0103

=== Repechages ===
Repechage		Bronze medal
John Buchanan (SCO)	1000
Dominic Agudoo (GHA)	0001	John Buchanan (SCO)	1001
		D Le Grange (RSA)	0001

Repechage		Bronze medal
Brandon Dodge (WAL)	0002
Razak Abugiri (GHA)	0122	Razak Abugiri (GHA)	1100
		Neuso Sigauque (MOZ)	0001
