= Rishod Sobirov =

Uzbekistani judoka (born 1986)

Personal information
- Born: 11 September 1986 (age 40)
- Occupation: Judoka

Sport
- Country: Uzbekistan
- Sport: Judo
- Weight class: –66 kg

Achievements and titles
- Olympic Games: (bronze) (2008, 2012, 2016)
- World Champ.: (gold) (2010, 2011)
- Asian Champ.: (gold) (2010)
Medal record
Men's judo
Representing Uzbekistan
Olympic Games
Bronze medal – third place	2008 Beijing	‍–‍60 kg
Bronze medal – third place	2012 London	‍–‍60 kg
Bronze medal – third place	2016 Rio de Janeiro	‍–‍66 kg
World Championships
Gold medal – first place	2010 Tokyo	‍–‍60 kg
Gold medal – first place	2011 Paris	‍–‍60 kg
Bronze medal – third place	2015 Astana	‍–‍66 kg
Asian Games
Gold medal – first place	2010 Guangzhou	‍–‍60 kg
Bronze medal – third place	2014 Incheon	Men's team
Asian Championships
Silver medal – second place	2007 Kuwait City	‍–‍60 kg
Bronze medal – third place	2009 Taipei	‍–‍60 kg
World Masters
Gold medal – first place	2010 Suwon	‍–‍60 kg
Gold medal – first place	2011 Baku	‍–‍60 kg
Silver medal – second place	2012 Almaty	‍–‍60 kg
IJF Grand Slam
Gold medal – first place	2010 Moscow	‍–‍60 kg
Gold medal – first place	2011 Paris	‍–‍60 kg
Gold medal – first place	2011 Moscow	‍–‍60 kg
Gold medal – first place	2012 Paris	‍–‍60 kg
Silver medal – second place	2010 Paris	‍–‍60 kg
Silver medal – second place	2010 Rio de Janeiro	‍–‍60 kg
Bronze medal – third place	2015 Abu Dhabi	‍–‍66 kg
IJF Grand Prix
Gold medal – first place	2009 Hamburg	‍–‍60 kg
Gold medal – first place	2010 Tunis	‍–‍60 kg
Gold medal – first place	2014 Tashkent	‍–‍66 kg
Gold medal – first place	2015 Samsun	‍–‍66 kg
Silver medal – second place	2012 Abu Dhabi	‍–‍66 kg
Bronze medal – third place	2009 Abu Dhabi	‍–‍60 kg
Bronze medal – third place	2016 Budapest	‍–‍66 kg
Asian Junior Championships
Gold medal – first place	2005 Beirut	‍–‍55 kg

Profile at external databases
- IJF: 689
- JudoInside.com: 40881
- Updated on 24 May 2023

Rishod Rashidovich Sobirov (Uzbek Cyrillic: Ришод Рашидович Собиров; born 11 September 1986) is an Uzbek judoka. He won the bronze medal in the Men's 60 kg at the 2008 Summer Olympics and two World Judo Championships in 2010 and 2011.

Sobirov later won a bronze medal in the men's under 60 kg division at the 2012 Summer Olympics in London and a bronze medal in the men's under 66 kg division at the 2016 Summer Olympics in Rio de Janeiro.

== Career ==
On November 12–14, 2005, he achieved 1st place in the Asian Youth Championship in Taipei, China.

He secured 2nd place in the Asian Championship held in Kuwait on May 12–18, 2007. He clinched 3rd place in the international tournament held on March 17–19, 2007, in Almaty, Kazakhstan.

He achieved 5th place at the Asian Championship held in Jeju, South Korea, on April 23–29, 2008, and 3rd place at the Olympic Games held in Beijing, China, on August 12–25, 2008. In the world championship held between teams on October 3–6, 2008, in Tokyo, Japan, he secured 2nd place and won the silver medal in the competition.

On March 20–23, 2009, he secured 1st place in the international tournament held in Hamburg, Germany, and 3rd place in the Asian Championship held in Taipei, China, on May 15–25, 2009.

He won 1st place in the international tournament held in Suwon, South Korea, on January 16–18, 2010, 2nd place in the international tournament held in Paris, France, on February 4–6, 2010, and 1st place in the international tournament held in Gammarth, Tunisia, on May 7–11, 2010. He also secured 2nd place in the international tournament held in Rio de Janeiro, Brazil, on May 11–17, 2010, and 1st place in the last international tournament held in Moscow, Russia, on July 1–5, 2010.

On September 6–12, 2010, he won the gold medal at the World Championship held in Tokyo, Japan.

On November 13–16, 2010, he took 1st place at the 16th Asian Games in Guangzhou, China, and won the gold medal in the competition.

On February 5–7, 2011, he secured the 1st place in the international tournament held in Baku, Azerbaijan.

He achieved 1st place in the international tournament held in Paris, France, on February 5–6, 2011, and in the international tournament held in Moscow, Russia, on May 20–25, 2011. He also secured 1st place at the world championship held in Paris, France, on August 23–27. He got 2nd place at the international tournament held in Almaty, Kazakhstan, on January 9–12, 2012.

On February 1–12, 2012, he secured 1st place in the international tournament held in Paris, France.

In 2012, he achieved 3rd place at the Summer Olympic Games held in London, England.

== Record against selected opponents ==
Includes results from the Olympics, World Championships, Asian Championships, World Cup, and Grand Prix Series events from 2006 to the present.

- (Italy) Elio Verde 7–0
- (Japan) Hiroaki Hiraoka 4–3
- (France) Sofiane Milous 4–0
- (Russia) Beslan Mudranov 4–0
- (Ukraine) Georgii Zantaraia 3–2
- (South Korea) Choi Min Ho 1–1
- (Algeria) Omar Rebahi 1–0
- (Czech Republic) Pavel Petřikov 1–0
- (Iran) Masoud Haji Akhound Zade 1–0
- (Canada) Frazer Will 2–0
- (France) Dmitri Dragin 2–0
- (Japan) Yano Daichi 1–0
- (Germany) Tobias Englmaier 2–1
- (Georgia (country)) Amiran Papinashvili 1–0
- (Georgia (country)) Levan Chubinadze 1–0
- (Saudi Arabia) Eisa Hassan Majrashi 1–0
- (Austria) Ludwig Paischer 1–0
- (Georgia (country)) David Asumbani 0–1
- (Japan) Masaaki Fukuoka 1–0
- (Brazil) Sergio Pessoa 1–0
- (Netherlands) Jeroen Mooren 2–0
- (Bulgaria) Yanislav Gerchev 1–0
- (South Korea) Jang Jin Ming 1–0
- (Yemen) Mohsen Ali Khousrof 1–0
