= Opondo =

Opondo is a surname. Notable people with the surname include:

- Moses Opondo (born 1997), Ugandan footballer
- Stephen Opondo (born 1994), Kenyan male weightlifter
