= Judo at the 2014 Commonwealth Games – Men's 81 kg =

Judo competition

Judo Judo – Men's 81 kg at the 2014 Commonwealth Games
- Venue: Scottish Exhibition and Conference Centre
- Date: 25 July 2014
- Competitors: 18 from 13 nations

Medalists
gold medal	Owen Livesey	England
silver medal	Tom Reed	England
bronze medal	Boas Munyonga	Zambia
bronze medal	Jonah Burt	Canada

The men's 81 kg Judo competitions at the 2014 Commonwealth Games in Glasgow, Scotland was held on 25 July at the Scottish Exhibition and Conference Centre. Judo returned to the program, after last being competed back in 2002.

== Results ==
=== Finals ===
Semifinals		Gold medal
J Burt (CAN)	0000
O Livesey (ENG)	1000	O Livesey (ENG)	0002
T Reed (ENG)	1000	T Reed (ENG)	0003
L Krieber-Gagnon (CAN)	0000

=== Repechages ===
Repechage		Bronze medal
L Messi (CMR)	0004
B Munyonga (ZAM)	1003	B Munyonga (ZAM)	1001
		L Krieber-Gagnon (CAN)	0000

Repechage		Bronze medal
		J Burt (CAN)	1000
Robert Nicola (CYP)	1000	R Nicola (CYP)	0001
M Brewer (NZL)	0001

=== Top half ===
Round of 32
C Ewers (WAL)	0001
J Burt (CAN)	1000

Round of 16
I Pavlinic (NZL)	0000
J Burt (CAN)	1000
A Alhassan (GHA)	0001
L Messi (CMR)	1010
O Livesey (ENG)	1001
J Kirimi (KEN)	0002
J Naulu (FIJ)	0004
B Munyonga (ZAM)	1001

Quarterfinals
J Burt (CAN)	1110
L Messi (CMR)	0003
O Livesey (ENG)	1010
B Munyonga (ZAM)	0004

Semifinals
J Burt (CAN)	0000
O Livesey (ENG)	1000

=== Bottom half ===
Round of 32
EJ Omgba Fouda (CMR)	1100
V Vikender Singh (IND)	0001

Round of 16
T Reed (ENG)	1010
EJ Omgba Fouda (CMR)	0000
J Omondi (KEN)	0000
R Nicola (CYP)	1100
M Brewer (NZL)	1010
L Philoe (SEY)	0000
A Linguni (MAW)	0000
L Krieber-Gagnon (CAN)	1000

Quarterfinals
T Reed (ENG)	1000
R Nicola (CYP)	0000
M Brewer (NZL)	0001
L Krieber-Gagnon (CAN)	0000

Semifinals
T Reed (ENG)	1000
L Krieber-Gagnon (CAN)	0000
