= Gideon Aigbefoh =

Nigerian weightlifter

Personal information
- Full name: Gideon Aigbefoh
- Born: 3 May 1990 (age 36)
- Weight: 84.04 kg (185.3 lb)

Sport
- Country: Nigeria
- Sport: Weightlifting
- Weight class: 85 kg
- Team: National team
- Updated on 19 October 2016

Gideon Aigbefoh (born 3 May 1990), is a Nigerian male weightlifter, competing in the 85Kg category and representing Nigeria at international competitions. He participated at the 2014 Commonwealth Games in the 85 kg event.

== Major competitions ==
Year	Venue	Weight	Snatch (kg)				Clean & Jerk (kg)				Total	Rank
Year	Venue	Weight	1	2	3	Rank	1	2	3	Rank	Total	Rank
Commonwealth Games
2014	Glasgow, Scotland	85 kg	142	~~147~~	147	—N/a	170	~~177~~	177	—N/a	324	4
