= Athletics at the 2010 Commonwealth Games – Women's 1500 metres (T54) =

The women's 1500 metres (T54) at the 2010 Commonwealth Games as part of the athletics programme was held at the Jawaharlal Nehru Stadium on Friday 8 October 2010.

== Results ==
Rank	Lane	Name	Result	Notes
1st place, gold medalist(s)	7	Diane Roy (CAN)	3:53.95	
2nd place, silver medalist(s)	2	Chineme Obeta (NGR)	4:09.29	
3rd place, bronze medalist(s)	4	Anita Fordjour (GHA)	4:18.83	PB
4	1	Ajara Mohammed (GHA)	4:21.26	PB
5	9	Bernice Frimpong (GHA)	4:27.25	PB
6	5	Patricia Nnaji (NGR)	4:28.50	
7	3	Marie Mustapha (MRI)	4:29.46	
8	10	Blessing Opeyemi (NGR)	5:01.54	
9	6	Caroline Wanjira (KEN)	5:03.73	
10	8	Eunice Otieno (KEN)	5:23.97	
11	11	Rahel Alar (KEN)	5:31.12	
