= Athletics at the 2014 Commonwealth Games – Women's 1500 metres (T54) =

The Women's 1,500 metres (T54) at the 2014 Commonwealth Games as part of the athletics programme was held at Hampden Park between 29 and 31 July 2014. The event was open to Para-sport wheelchair athletes competing under the T54 classification.

== Results ==
=== First round ===
The first round consisted of two heats, with qualification to the finals for the first three in each heat and the four fastest losers over the two heats.

==== Heat 1 ====
| Rank | Lane | Name | Result | Notes | Qual. |
|---|---|---|---|---|---|
| 1 | 1 | Diane Roy (CAN) | 3:52.83 | | Q |
| 2 | 7 | Christie Dawes (AUS) | 3:53.07 | | Q |
| 3 | 2 | Jade Jones (ENG) | 3:53.37 | | Q |
| 4 | 6 | Meggan Dawson-Farrell (SCO) | 3:58.78 | | q |
| 5 | 5 | Anita Fordjour (GHA) | 4:21.24 | SB | q |
| 6 | 3 | Bernice Frimpong (GHA) | 4:21.58 | PB | |
| 7 | 4 | Caroline Wanjira (KEN) | 5:01.89 | PB | |

==== Heat 2 ====
| Rank | Lane | Name | Result | Notes | Qual. |
|---|---|---|---|---|---|
| 1 | 2 | Shelly Woods (ENG) | 4:00:82 | | Q |
| 2 | 6 | Angela Ballard (AUS) | 4:01.69 | | Q |
| 3 | 4 | Samantha Kinghorn (SCO) | 4:03.41 | | Q |
| 4 | 5 | Ajara Mohammed (GHA) | 4:05.04 | PB | q |
| 5 | 1 | Lauren Rowles (ENG) | 4:08.99 | | q |
| 6 | 3 | Eunice adhiambo Otieno (KEN) | 4:53.65 | PB | |
| 7 | 7 | Rahel akoth Alar (KEN) | 4:53.93 | PB | |

=== Final ===
| Rank | Lane | Name | Result | Notes |
|---|---|---|---|---|
| 1st place, gold medalist(s) | 7 | Angela Ballard (AUS) | 3:59.20 | |
| 2nd place, silver medalist(s) | 9 | Diane Roy (CAN) | 3:59.55 | |
| 3rd place, bronze medalist(s) | 1 | Jade Jones (ENG) | 4:00.09 | |
| 4 | 4 | Christie Dawes (AUS) | 4:03.43 | |
| 5 | 10 | Samantha Kinghorn (SCO) | 4:03.95 | |
| 6 | 2 | Shelly Woods (ENG) | 4:06.26 | |
| 7 | 8 | Meggan Dawson-Farrell (SCO) | 4:07.86 | |
| 8 | 5 | Anita Fordjour (GHA) | 4:11.29 | PB |
| 9 | 6 | Lauren Rowles (ENG) | 4:11.34 | |
| 10 | 3 | Ajara Mohammed (GHA) | 4:30.99 | |
