= Nerkin Karmiraghbyur =

Nerkin Karmiraghbyur Ներքին Կարմիրաղբյուր
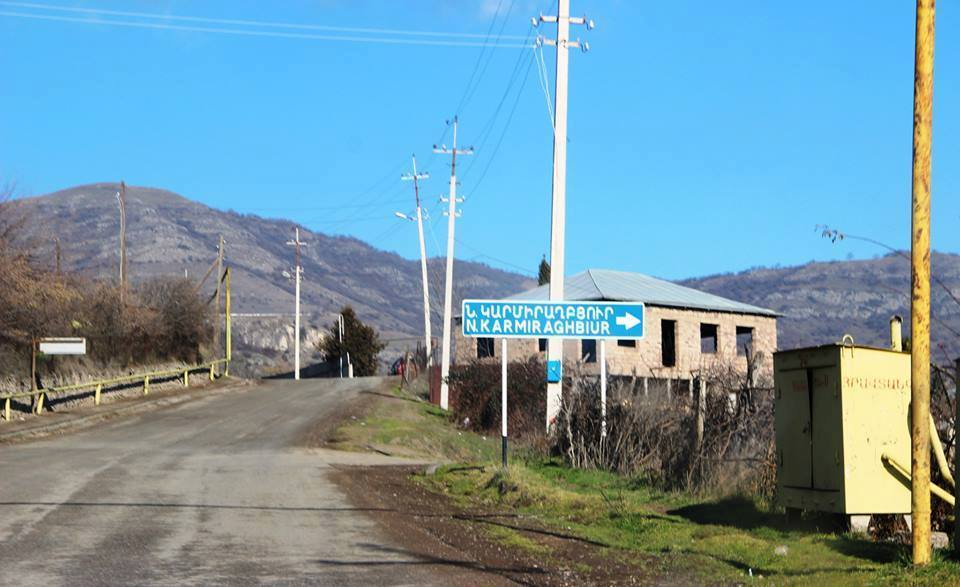
- Village entrance

- Location within Armenia Location within Tavush
- Coordinates: 40°56′53″N 45°25′59″E
- Country: Armenia
- Province: Tavush
- Municipality: Berd

Population (2011)
  - Total: 904
- Time zone: UTC+4 (AMT)

Nerkin Karmiraghbyur (Armenian: Ներքին Կարմիրաղբյուր) is a village in the Berd Municipality of the Tavush Province of Armenia.

== Notable people ==
- Arsen Galstyan, Olympic and European champion in judo representing Russia.
