= 2016 Judo Grand Prix Havana =

Judo competition

Judo 2016 Judo Grand Prix Havana
- Venue: Coliseo de la Ciudad Deportiva
- Location: Havana, Cuba
- Dates: 22–24 January 2016
- Competitors: 386 from 66 nations

Competition at external databases
- Links: IJF • JudoInside

The 2016 Judo Grand Prix Havana was held at the Coliseo de la Ciudad Deportiva in Havana, Cuba from 22 to 24 January 2016.

== Medal summary ==
=== Men's events ===
Event	Gold	Silver	Bronze
Extra-lightweight (−60 kg)	Eric Takabatake (BRA)	Bekir Özlü (TUR)	Orkhan Safarov (AZE)
Extra-lightweight (−60 kg)	Eric Takabatake (BRA)	Bekir Özlü (TUR)	Hovhannes Davtyan (ARM)
Half-lightweight (−66 kg)	Kamal Khan-Magomedov (RUS)	Loïc Korval (FRA)	Vazha Margvelashvili (GEO)
Half-lightweight (−66 kg)	Kamal Khan-Magomedov (RUS)	Loïc Korval (FRA)	Elio Verde (ITA)
Lightweight (−73 kg)	Rustam Orujov (AZE)	Victor Scvortov (UAE)	Ganbaataryn Odbayar (MGL)
Lightweight (−73 kg)	Rustam Orujov (AZE)	Victor Scvortov (UAE)	Igor Wandtke (GER)
Half-middleweight (−81 kg)	Khasan Khalmurzaev (RUS)	Travis Stevens (USA)	László Csoknyai (HUN)
Half-middleweight (−81 kg)	Khasan Khalmurzaev (RUS)	Travis Stevens (USA)	Roman Moustopoulos (GRE)
Middleweight (−90 kg)	Asley González (CUB)	Krisztián Tóth (HUN)	Ciril Grossklaus (SUI)
Middleweight (−90 kg)	Asley González (CUB)	Krisztián Tóth (HUN)	Aleksandar Kukolj (SRB)
Half-heavyweight (−100 kg)	Artem Bloshenko (UKR)	Karl-Richard Frey (GER)	Miklós Cirjenics (HUN)
Half-heavyweight (−100 kg)	Artem Bloshenko (UKR)	Karl-Richard Frey (GER)	Elkhan Mammadov (AZE)
Heavyweight (+100 kg)	Renat Saidov (RUS)	Barna Bor (HUN)	André Breitbarth (GER)
Heavyweight (+100 kg)	Renat Saidov (RUS)	Barna Bor (HUN)	Alex García Mendoza (CUB)

=== Women's events ===
Event	Gold	Silver	Bronze
Extra-lightweight (−48 kg)	Sarah Menezes (BRA)	Shira Rishony (ISR)	Paula Pareto (ARG)
Extra-lightweight (−48 kg)	Sarah Menezes (BRA)	Shira Rishony (ISR)	Dayaris Mestre Álvarez (CUB)
Half-lightweight (−52 kg)	Mareen Kräh (GER)	Ilse Heylen (BEL)	Odette Giuffrida (ITA)
Half-lightweight (−52 kg)	Mareen Kräh (GER)	Ilse Heylen (BEL)	Adiyaasambuugiin Tsolmon (MGL)
Lightweight (−57 kg)	Marti Malloy (USA)	Hedvig Karakas (HUN)	Nora Gjakova (KOS)
Lightweight (−57 kg)	Marti Malloy (USA)	Hedvig Karakas (HUN)	Rafaela Silva (BRA)
Half-middleweight (−63 kg)	Yarden Gerbi (ISR)	Maricet Espinosa (CUB)	Ekaterina Valkova (RUS)
Half-middleweight (−63 kg)	Yarden Gerbi (ISR)	Maricet Espinosa (CUB)	Mia Hermansson (SWE)
Middleweight (−70 kg)	Linda Bolder (ISR)	Szabina Gercsák (HUN)	Maria Portela (BRA)
Middleweight (−70 kg)	Linda Bolder (ISR)	Szabina Gercsák (HUN)	Marie-Ève Gahié (FRA)
Half-heavyweight (−78 kg)	Abigél Joó (HUN)	Luise Malzahn (GER)	Kayla Harrison (USA)
Half-heavyweight (−78 kg)	Abigél Joó (HUN)	Luise Malzahn (GER)	Assunta Galeone (ITA)
Heavyweight (+78 kg)	Idalys Ortiz (CUB)	Lucie Louette (FRA)	Svitlana Iaromka (UKR)
Heavyweight (+78 kg)	Idalys Ortiz (CUB)	Lucie Louette (FRA)	Vanessa Zambotti (MEX)

Source Results

=== Medal table ===
* Host nation (Cuba)

Rank	Nation	Gold	Silver	Bronze	Total
1	Russia (RUS)	3	0	1	4
2	Cuba (CUB)*	2	1	2	5
3	Israel (ISR)	2	1	0	3
4	Brazil (BRA)	2	0	2	4
5	Hungary (HUN)	1	4	2	7
6	Germany (GER)	1	2	2	5
7	United States (USA)	1	1	1	3
8	Azerbaijan (AZE)	1	0	2	3
9	Ukraine (UKR)	1	0	1	2
10	France (FRA)	0	2	1	3
11	Belgium (BEL)	0	1	0	1
11	Turkey (TUR)	0	1	0	1
11	United Arab Emirates (UAE)	0	1	0	1
14	Italy (ITA)	0	0	3	3
15	Mongolia (MGL)	0	0	2	2
16	Argentina (ARG)	0	0	1	1
16	Armenia (ARM)	0	0	1	1
16	Georgia (GEO)	0	0	1	1
16	Greece (GRE)	0	0	1	1
16	Kosovo (KOS)	0	0	1	1
16	Mexico (MEX)	0	0	1	1
16	Serbia (SRB)	0	0	1	1
16	Sweden (SWE)	0	0	1	1
16	Switzerland (SUI)	0	0	1	1
Totals (24 entries)		14	14	28	56
