= Judo at the 2012 Summer Olympics – Men's 60 kg =

Judo competition

Men's 60kg at the Games of the XXX Olympiad
- Venue: ExCeL Exhibition Centre
- Date: 28 July 2012
- Competitors: 37 from 37 nations

Medalists
1st place, gold medalist(s)		Arsen Galstyan	Russia
2nd place, silver medalist(s)		Hiroaki Hiraoka	Japan
3rd place, bronze medalist(s)		Felipe Kitadai	Brazil
3rd place, bronze medalist(s)		Rishod Sobirov	Uzbekistan

Men's 60 kg competition in judo at the 2012 Summer Olympics in London, United Kingdom was held at ExCeL London. Judo events took place between 28 July and 3 August.

The gold and silver medals were determined by a single-elimination tournament, with the winner of the final taking gold and the loser receiving silver. Judo events awarded two bronze medals. Quarterfinal losers competed in a repechage match for the right to face a semifinal loser for a bronze medal (that is, the judokas defeated in quarterfinals A and B competed against each other, with the winner of that match facing the semifinal loser from the other half of the bracket).

== Schedule ==
All times are British Summer Time (UTC+1)

Date	Time	Round
Saturday, 28 July 2012	09:30; 14:00; 16:10	Qualifications; Semifinals; Final

== Results ==
=== Finals ===
Semi-finals
Rishod Sobirov (UZB)	0000
Arsen Galstyan (RUS)	0011
Hiroaki Hiraoka (JPN)	0110
Elio Verde (ITA)	0000

Final
Arsen Galstyan (RUS)	1000
Hiroaki Hiraoka (JPN)	0000

=== Repechages ===
Repechage		Bronze medal
Felipe Kitadai (BRA)	0011
Choi Gwang-Hyeon (KOR)	0001	Felipe Kitadai (BRA)	0011
		Elio Verde (ITA)	0000

Repechage		Bronze medal
Sofiane Milous (FRA)	0010
Hovhannes Davtyan (ARM)	0002	Sofiane Milous (FRA)	0003
		Rishod Sobirov (UZB)	0010

=== Pool A ===
First Round
J Gnahoui (BEN)	0000
L Paischer (AUT)	0100

Second Round
R Sobirov (UZB)	0210
L Paischer (AUT)	0000
J Guédez (VEN)	0111
A Lamusi (CHN)	0000
T Davaadorj (MGL)	0000
F Kitadai (BRA)	0110
E Majrashi (KSA)	1000
R Lall (GUY)	0000

Third Round
R Sobirov (UZB)	1000
J Guédez (VEN)	0000
F Kitadai (BRA)	0210
E Majrashi (KSA)	0000

Quarterfinals
R Sobirov (UZB)	100
F Kitadai (BRA)	001

=== Pool B ===
First Round
Z Gourouza (NIG)	0100
K Godoy (HON)	0000

Second Round
A Galstyan (RUS)	1010
Z Gourouza (NIG)	0000
Y Siccardi (MON)	1010
A Khousrof (YEM)	0012
G-H Choi (KOR)	0010
L Chammartin (SUI)	0000
Y Moudatir (MAR)	0000
V Jokinen (FIN)	1000

Third Round
A Galstyan (RUS)	0100
Y Siccardi (MON)	0000
G-H Choi (KOR)	0010
V Jokinen (FIN)	0000

Quarterfinals
A Galstyan (RUS)	0001
G-H Choi (KOR)	0001

=== Pool C ===
First Round
B Shukvani (GEO)	0103
A Dickins (AUS)	0000

Second Round
H Hiraoka (JPN)	0111
A McKenzie (GBR)	0000
J Mooren (NED)	0001
A Arshanski (ISR)	0001
S Milous (FRA)	0100
B Shukvani (GEO)	0001
N Sigauque (MOZ)	0010
T Lomo (SOL)	0100

Third Round
H Hiraoka (JPN)	0012
A Arshanski (ISR)	0000
S Milous (FRA)	0020
T Lomo (SOL)	0001

Quarterfinals
H Hiraoka (JPN)	0012
S Milous (FRA)	0010

=== Pool D ===
First Round
E Verde (ITA)	0100
J Postigos (PER)	0001
T Englmaier (GER)	0002
H Davtyan (ARM)	1011

Second Round
G Zantaraia (UKR)	0000
E Verde (ITA)	0001
R Khom (CAM)	0000
N Castillo (MEX)	0100
I Mushkiyev (AZE)	0000
H Davtyan (ARM)	0101
S Pessoa (CAN)	0000
Y Kossayev (KAZ)	0001

Third Round
E Verde (ITA)	0101
N Castillo (MEX)	0001
H Davtyan (ARM)	0100
Y Kossayev (KAZ)	0000

Quarterfinals
E Verde (ITA)	0001
H Davtyan (ARM)	0000
