= Tom Reed (judoka) =

British judoka

Personal information
- Nationality: British (English)
- Born: 29 January 1986 (age 40) Devizes, England
- Occupation: Judoka
- Height: 5 ft 10 in (178 cm)

Sport
- Country: England
- Sport: Judo
- Weight class: –81 kg

Achievements and titles
- World Champ.: R64 (2010)
- European Champ.: R64 (2011)
- Commonwealth Games: (silver) (2014)
Medal record
Men's judo
Representing Great Britain
IJF Grand Prix
Gold medal – first place	2013 Miami	–81 kg
European U23 Championships
Silver medal – second place	2007 Salzburg	–81 kg
Bronze medal – third place	2006 Moscow	–73 kg
Representing England
Commonwealth Games
Silver medal – second place	2014 Glasgow	–81 kg

Profile at external databases
- IJF: 1915
- JudoInside.com: 22684
- Updated on 10 February 2022

Thomas David Reed (born 29 January 1986) is a British judoka.

== Judo career ==
He began his training at Devizes judo club before joining Team Bath's High-Performance Training Programme in 2003, aged 16. In 2006, following a gap year, in which he trained at Tokai University in Japan, he began a degree in Business Administration at the University of Bath. The same year, coached by Jurgan Klinger, he won bronze in the European under 23 Judo Championships in Moscow.

He followed this up in 2007 with a silver at the European under 23 Judo Championships in Salzburg and became champion of Great Britain, winning the half-middleweight division at the British Judo Championships. Following his uncle in becoming a GB judo player, in the following years, Reed placed or medalled in numerous international tournaments and European Cup events, including winning gold medals in the English, Welsh and Scottish opens, a gold in the Swedish open and a silver medal in the London European Cup (British Open)

In 2012, he won his second British national championship but missed out on a place in the London 2012 Olympics to the more experienced Euan Burton. Reed had previously lost a match to Burton in the final of the 2009 GB World Cup in Birmingham.

He competed for England in the men's 81 kg event at the 2014 Commonwealth Games where he won a silver medal, losing to fellow England international Owen Livesey.

His efforts to qualify for the Rio 2016 Olympic Games were thwarted by a major elbow injury. In an interview, Reed stated that his elbow was "getting arthritic and bone fragments had moved into muscle areas". In a December 2015 interview with the BBC, Reed stated that though the required surgery was expected to be relatively straight forward and the recovery was only expected to take six weeks, he was still unsure when it would take place. "The big question is when I get that surgery. I'm on a waiting list and have been waiting six months. Now it looks like after Christmas. That will only get me three or four tournaments left in the Olympic qualification [period]."

This proved to be the case and Reed was left needing 300 points from two remaining tournaments after only managing a 7th place finish in the 2016 African Open. He retired from the sport after failing to qualify shortly thereafter.
