= Arsen Galstyan =

Russian Judoka, Olympic champion

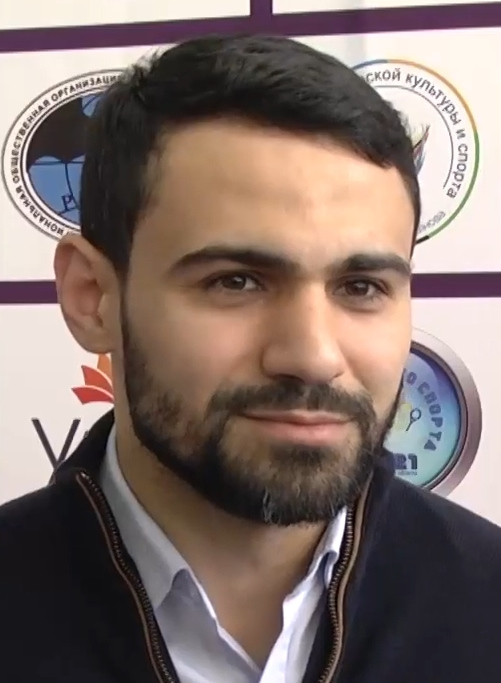
- Galstyan in 2021

Personal information
- Nationality: Russia
- Born: Арсен Жораевич Галстян; 19 February 1989 (age 37) Nerkin Karmiraghbyur, Armenian Soviet Socialist Republic, USSR
- Occupation: Judoka
- Height: 1.70 m (5 ft 7 in)

Sport
- Country: Russia
- Sport: Judo
- Weight class: ‍–‍60 kg, ‍–‍66 kg
- Coached by: Igor Romanov

Achievements and titles
- Olympic Games: (gold) (2012)
- World Champ.: (bronze) (2010)
- European Champ.: (gold) (2009)
Medal record
Men's judo
Representing Russia
Olympic Games
Gold medal – first place	2012 London	‍–‍60 kg
World Championships
Bronze medal – third place	2010 Tokyo	‍–‍60 kg
European Championships
Gold medal – first place	2009 Tbilisi	‍–‍60 kg
Bronze medal – third place	2011 Istanbul	‍–‍60 kg
Bronze medal – third place	2016 Kazan	‍–‍66 kg
World Masters
Gold medal – first place	2012 Almaty	‍–‍60 kg
Silver medal – second place	2011 Baku	‍–‍60 kg
Bronze medal – third place	2010 Suwon	‍–‍60 kg
IJF Grand Slam
Silver medal – second place	2015 Abu Dhabi	‍–‍66 kg
Bronze medal – third place	2009 Rio de Janeiro	‍–‍60 kg
Bronze medal – third place	2010 Rio de Janeiro	‍–‍60 kg
Bronze medal – third place	2016 Abu Dhabi	‍–‍66 kg
IJF Grand Prix
Silver medal – second place	2010 Abu Dhabi	‍–‍60 kg
Bronze medal – third place	2010 Qingdao	‍–‍60 kg
Bronze medal – third place	2013 Abu Dhabi	‍–‍60 kg
Bronze medal – third place	2014 Düsseldorf	‍–‍60 kg
Bronze medal – third place	2014 Tbilisi	‍–‍60 kg
Bronze medal – third place	2015 Budapest	‍–‍66 kg
Bronze medal – third place	2015 Ulaanbaatar	‍–‍66 kg
World Juniors Championships
Gold medal – first place	2008 Bangkok	‍–‍60 kg
European Junior Championships
Gold medal – first place	2007 Prague	‍–‍60 kg
European Cadet Championships
Gold medal – first place	2005 Salzburg	‍–‍60 kg
Summer Universiade
Silver medal – second place	2013 Kazan	‍–‍60 kg

Profile at external databases
- IJF: 353
- JudoInside.com: 38730
- Updated on 25 May 2023

Arsen Zhorayevich Galstyan (Armenian: Արսեն Գալստյան, Russian: Арсен Жораевич Галстян, born 19 February 1989) is a Russian judoka. Galstyan is a Merited Master of Sports of Russia and an Olympic Champion at the 2012 Summer Olympics.

== Biography ==
Arsen Galstyan was born on 19 February 1989 in the village of Nerkin Karmiraghbyur in north-east Armenia. His father was a football player, playing for the club Impuls FC Dilijan in the second half of the 1970s and later played as a part of FC Ararat Yerevan. While living in Armenia, Galstyan played the drums in the national ensemble. When he was seven, his family moved to Russia and settled in the stanitsa village of Giaginskaya, Adygea. He studied at the School № 4 of the village and started judo at a local sports club. Galstyan first played volleyball and then football before judo. His brothers, Arman and Tigran, also compete in judo. Igor Romanov was the first coach of Arsen and is still his personal trainer.

Galstyan later moved to Krasnodar, where he currently lives. He worked as a junior inspector of security detention center № 1 FPS in Russia's Krasnodar region. Galstyan was a student in the sports department of the Kabardino-Balkarian State University.

In 2007, he finished third at the Russian National Championship and, in the same year, first represented Russia internationally. He has been a member of the Russian national judo team since 2007. In 2009, he became a European Champion, and in 2010 he won a bronze medal in the World Championship.

Galstyan competed at the 2012 Summer Olympics in the Men's -60 kg division. Galstyan was an underdog and found himself fighting all of the favorites. In the semifinals, he bested Asian Champion Choi Gwang-Hyeon. Galstyan next overcame reigning two-time World Champion Rishod Sobirov, ranked number one by the International Judo Federation, in the semifinals. Finally, Arsen Galstyan and Hiroaki Hiraoka fought in the finals, and Galstyan defeated Hiraoka with an ippon after 41 seconds. Galstyan scored the ippon as he was about to fall victim to an ippon of Hiraoka's. He brought Russia its first gold medal of the Olympic Games. He dedicated his victory to the victims of the flood in the Krasnodar region.

R-Sport News Agency named Galstyan Russia’s second most successful athlete for 2012. He was also ranked in Russia's top ten athletes of 2012 by the Russian Sports Journalists Federation.

== Personal life ==
In December 2010, Galstyan fought, as a sparring partner, against Russian Prime Minister Vladimir Putin, a black belt and former judo champion.

His father was his last football coach. Arsen's two brothers, senior Tigran and junior Arman, are both masters of judo and help Arsen train. Galstyan is not married. As of 2012, Galstyan lives in the city of Krasnodar.

Galstyan visited Armenia after winning his Olympic gold medal and was called a hero by those in his home country, which was the most enjoyable Olympic moment for him. He still considers Armenia to be his home country, along with Russia. Armenian Sports and Youth Affairs Minister Hrachya Rostomyan congratulated Galstyan on his 2012 Olympic victory. Galstyan also urged all foreign Armenian athletes to maintain closer ties with the homeland.

== Awards ==
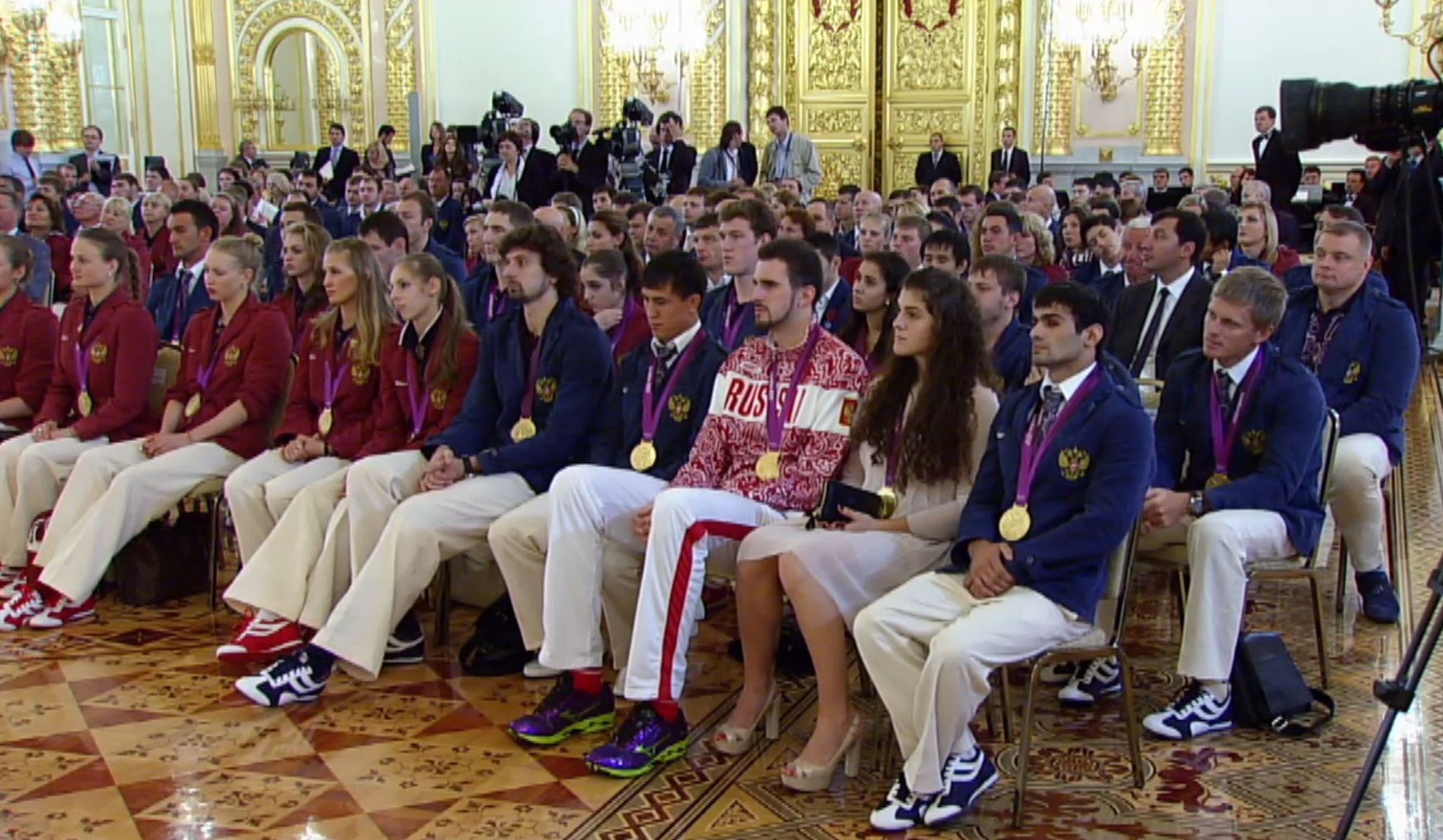
Arsen Galstyan (front row right) at the presentation of state awards in the Kremlin

- Honored Master of Sports of Russia (March 26, 2012)
- Order of Friendship (13 August 2012) - for outstanding contribution to the development of physical culture and sports, high achievements in sports at the 2012 Summer Olympics in London, United Kingdom.
