= Stephen Opondo =

Kenyan weightlifter

Personal information
- Full name: Steven Opondo
- Born: 20 March 1994 (age 32)
- Weight: 84.65 kg (186.6 lb)

Sport
- Country: Kenya
- Sport: Weightlifting
- Weight class: 85 kg
- Team: National team
- Coached by: David Adeyemo & John Ogolla
- Updated on 19 October 2016

Steven Opondo (born 20 March 1994) is a Kenyan male weightlifter, competing in the 85 kg category and representing Kenya at international competitions. He participated at the 2014 Commonwealth Games in the 85 kg event, he is coached by David Adeyemo.

== Major competitions ==
Year	Venue	Weight	Snatch (kg)				Clean & Jerk (kg)				Total	Rank
Year	Venue	Weight	1	2	3	Rank	1	2	3	Rank	Total	Rank
Commonwealth Games
2014	Glasgow, Scotland	85 kg	100	106	~~110~~	—N/a	143	~~147~~	147	—N/a	253	17
