= Hovhannes Davtyan (judoka) =

Armenian judoka

Personal information
- Nationality: Armenian
- Born: 25 November 1983 (age 42)
- Occupation: Judoka

Sport
- Country: Armenia
- Sport: Judo
- Weight class: ‍–‍60 kg

Achievements and titles
- Olympic Games: 7th (2012)
- World Champ.: (bronze) (2009)
- European Champ.: (silver) (2007, 2012)
Medal record
Men's judo
Representing Armenia
World Championships
Bronze medal – third place	2009 Rotterdam	‍–‍60 kg
European Championships
Silver medal – second place	2007 Belgrade	‍–‍60 kg
Silver medal – second place	2012 Chelyabinsk	‍–‍60 kg
Bronze medal – third place	2014 Montpellier	‍–‍60 kg
Bronze medal – third place	2016 Kazan	‍–‍60 kg
IJF Grand Slam
Gold medal – first place	2009 Moscow	‍–‍60 kg
Silver medal – second place	2011 Paris	‍–‍60 kg
Bronze medal – third place	2013 Moscow	‍–‍60 kg
IJF Grand Prix
Gold medal – first place	2015 Zagreb	‍–‍60 kg
Silver medal – second place	2014 Qingdao	‍–‍60 kg
Bronze medal – third place	2010 Abu Dhabi	‍–‍60 kg
Bronze medal – third place	2016 Havana	‍–‍60 kg

Profile at external databases
- IJF: 425
- JudoInside.com: 32734
- Updated on 13 August 2023

Hovhannes Davtyan (Armenian: Հովհաննես Դավթյան, born 25 November 1983, in Leninakan, Armenian SSR) is a former judoka and current head coach of the Armenian Men's Judo Team. He fights in the under 60 kg category, and is very tall compared to the other fighters in his weight division.

== Early life ==
Hovhannes Davtyan was born on November 25, 1983, in Leninakan, Armenian SSR (now Gyumri, Armenia). He began practicing judo at the age of 12 years under his current coach Karen Simonyan.

== Career ==
Davtyan made his debut on the international stage in January 2005 at the World Cup in Tbilisi, where he took fifth place and left without a medal. In March of that year, at another stage of the World Cup tour in Tallinn, Davtyan, for the first time in his career, became a medal winner of the international competition, winning a silver medal. In October and November 2005, in preparation for the European Championship, Davtyan won second place at an international tournament in Sweden and won antologichnogo tournament in Finland. Held in Kyiv at the European Youth Championship, Davtyan took 5th place.

=== 2006 ===
2006 was, as a whole, not successful for the Armenian athlete. In March, at the World Cup in Prague, he lost in one of the circles of the decisive battle. Davtyan still got the opportunity to fight for the bronze medal. However, he lost and took fifth place.

=== 2007 ===
In 2007, Davtyan performed quite successfully. In January, at the World Cup in Tbilisi, the Armenian sportsman took third place. At the beginning of the next month, at the Super World Cup in Paris, he took fifth place. A few weeks later, at the end of February, at another stage of the Super World Cup in Paris, Davtyan won the tournament and won his first gold medal in the international arena. In April 2007, at the European Championships in Belgrade, Davtyan ranked second. A month later, at the next stage of the World Cup, held in Moscow, Davtyan won the gold medal. At the end of that year, Davtyan took second place at an international tournament in Yerevan and the International Cup in Tehran.

=== 2008 ===
At the beginning of 2008, at the World Cup in Tbilisi, Davtyan ranked fifth. In early February, at the Super World Cup in Paris, he came in seventh. At the Super World Cup, held in late February in Hamburg, he was third. In Lisbon, the European Championships, Davtyan finished seventh in the final. In the same year, as part of the Armenia national team, Davtyan went to the 2008 Summer Olympics in Beijing. After winning in the first round against Cuba's Yosmani Piker, he lost in the second round to North Korea's Kim Kyong-Jin.

=== 2009 ===
On February 28, at the World Cup in Warsaw, Davtyan took second place. In May, he won the Grand Slam tournament, held in Moscow. In August, at the 2009 World Judo Championships in Rotterdam, Davtyan was third. Then, in November, he won the championship of Armenia. At the end of the year, Davtyan went to the stage of the Grand Slam in Tokyo, where he finished fifth.

=== 2010 ===
In March 2010, Hovhannes Davtyan won the Cup of Armenia. At the 2010 European Judo Championships, held in Vienna, he ranked fifth. In November of the same year, at the Grand Prix in Abu Dhabi, Davtyan was third.

=== 2011 ===
In late January, at the World Cup in Tbilisi, Hovhannes Davtyan came third. In early February, at the Grand Slam tournament in Paris, he won second place. Then, a week later, at the World Cup in Budapest, he again came in second. A week later, on February 19, at the Grand Prix in Düsseldorf, Davtyan was in fifth. After seven days, the World Cup in Warsaw took place in late February, Davtyan came in second place. In May, at the Grand Slam tournament in Moscow, Davtyan was fifth, and in August at the 2011 World Judo Championships in Paris, Davtyan came in seventh place. In that year, he gained the necessary ranking points to secure a ticket to the Olympic Games in London in 2012.

=== 2012 ===
On February 4, 2012, at the Grand Slam tournament in Paris, Davtyan was seventh. After that, at the 2012 European Judo Championships in Chelyabinsk, Davtyan won a silver medal. In June, at the World Cup held in Prague, Davtyan came in second. At the 2012 Summer Olympics in London, Davtyan knocked out German Tobias Englmaier, Azeri Ilgar Mushkiyev and Kazakh Yerkebulan Kossayev. In the fight for the semi-finals, Davtyan narrowly lost to Italian Elio Verde. After this, Davtyan had the opportunity to compete for the Olympic bronze medal, but controversially lost to Frenchman Sofiane Milous and took seventh place. According to Karen Simonyan, Davtyan's coach, there were interference during his matches. He revealed Davtyan performed throws which should have been scored as a ‘yuko’ (a throw that places the opponent onto his side), but this did not happen. Also, Davtyan was groundlessly given a second warning, which gave a point to the opponent and Davtyan lost.

== Achievements ==
Year	Tournament	Place	Weight class
2007	European Judo Championships	2nd	Extra lightweight (–60 kg)
2008	European Championships	7th	Extra lightweight (–60 kg)
2009	World Championships	3rd	Extra lightweight (–60 kg)
2012	European Judo Championships	2nd	Extra lightweight (–60 kg)
