= Sofiane Milous =

French judoka (born 1988)

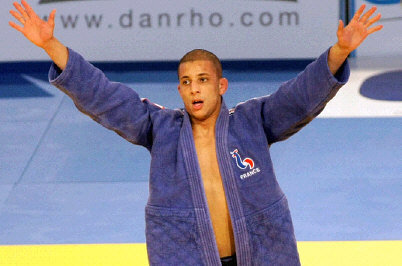

Personal information
- Born: 1 July 1988 (age 37)
- Occupation: Judoka

Sport
- Country: France
- Sport: Judo
- Weight class: ‍–‍60 kg

Achievements and titles
- Olympic Games: 5th (2012)
- World Champ.: 7th (2014)
- European Champ.: (gold) (2010)
Medal record
Men's judo
Representing France
European Championships
Gold medal – first place	2010 Vienna	‍–‍60 kg
IJF Grand Slam
Silver medal – second place	2011 Moscow	‍–‍60 kg
Bronze medal – third place	2011 Rio de Janeiro	‍–‍60 kg
Bronze medal – third place	2012 Tokyo	‍–‍60 kg
Bronze medal – third place	2014 Baku	‍–‍60 kg
IJF Grand Prix
Silver medal – second place	2013 Rijeka	‍–‍60 kg
Bronze medal – third place	2014 Budapest	‍–‍60 kg

Profile at external databases
- IJF: 1894
- JudoInside.com: 38568
- Updated on 15 November 2022

Sofiane Milous (born 1 July 1988, Drancy) is a French judoka who competes in the men's 60 kg category (Note: "Sofiane Milous". London 2012. The London Organising Committee of the Olympic Games and Paralympic Games Limited.) and winner of the 2010 European Championships in that division. He was French champion in 2011 and 2015. At the 2012 Summer Olympics, he was defeated in the quarter finals. He beat Betkili Shukvani and Tony Lomo before losing to Hiroaki Hiraoka. Because Hiraoka reached the final, Milous entered the repechage, beating Hovhannes Davtyan before losing to Rishod Sobirov in his bronze medal match.

In 2015, Milous won the African Open.
