= Nana Antwi Manu =

Ghanaian footballer (born 1994)

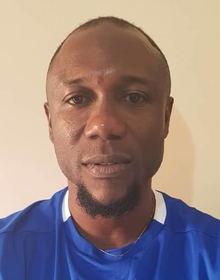

Personal information
- Full name: Nana Antwi Manu
- Date of birth: 8 April 1994 (age 32)
- Place of birth: Kumasi, Ashanti, Ghana
- Height: 1.80 m (5 ft 11 in)
- Positions: Striker; attacking midfielder

Team information
- Current team: Amanat Baghdad SC

Youth career
- 2006–2010: Hamburg FC (Kumasi)
- 2010–2014: Achiken FC

Senior career*
Years	Team	Apps	(Gls)
2014–2017	Achiken FC	0	(0)
2017–2018	Bechem United FC	16	(2)
2018–2020	FC San Pédro	26	(10)
2020–2020	Haras El Hodoud SC	21	(1)
2020–2021	ZED FC	24	(4)
2021–	Amanat Baghdad SC	1	(0)
- * Club domestic league appearances and goals

Nana Antwi Manu (born 8 April 1994), sometimes known mononymously as Antwi, is a Ghanaian footballer who plays as a striker for Amanat Baghdad SC of Iraqi Premier League.

== Club career ==
=== Early career ===
Born in Kumasi, Ashanti, Antwi began his career at local club Hamburg F.C. before later joining Achiken FC. On 1 January 2017, Antwi left Achiken FC, to sign a contract with Bechem United. Antwi was with Bechem United from 2017 to 2018, He played a few matches due to injuries. On 2 February 2018, Antwi left Bechem United, to sign a contract with FC San Pédro.

=== San Pédro ===
In February 2018, Antwi's arrival was announced. Antwi did not have injuries so he became regular in 2018–20 season. Antwi was a key member in FC San Pédro team both in Ligue 1 (Ivory Coast) and CAF Confederation Cup.

=== Haras El Hodoud ===
On 1 July 2019, Antwi signed to Haras El Hodoud SC. Antwi spent a season at Haras El Hodoud SC. He left at the end of the season to join ZED FC formerly FC Masr

=== Zed FC ===
On 24 November, Nana Anwti signed to ZED FC. Nana Antwi left in September 2021 to join Iraqi Premier League side Amanat Baghdad SC.

=== Amanat Baghdad SC ===
On 15 September, Nana Antwi signed to Amanat Baghdad SC for one season.

== Career statistics ==
=== Club ===
As of 28 October 2021

Club	League		Cup		Continental		Total	
Club	Apps	Goals	Apps	Goals	Apps	Goals	Apps	Goals
Bechem United	16	2	1	0	0	0	17	2
San Pédro	26	10	4	0	6	1	36	11
Haras El Hodoud	22	1	1	0	0	0	23	1
ZED FC	22	4	2	0	0	0	24	4
Amanat Baghdad SC	1	0	0	0	0	0	0	0
Career total	87	17	8	0	6	1	0	18
