= Prince Nyarko =

Ghanaian weightlifter

Personal information
- Full name: Prince Nyarko
- Born: 4 August 1995 (age 30)
- Weight: 84.10 kg (185.4 lb)

Sport
- Country: Ghana
- Sport: Weightlifting
- Weight class: 85 kg
- Team: National team
- Updated on 19 October 2016

Prince Nyarko (born 4 August 1995) is a Ghanaian male weightlifter, competing in the 85 kg category and representing Ghana at international competitions. He participated at the 2014 Commonwealth Games in the 85 kg event.

== Major competitions ==
Year	Venue	Weight	Snatch (kg)				Clean & Jerk (kg)				Total	Rank
Year	Venue	Weight	1	2	3	Rank	1	2	3	Rank	Total	Rank
Commonwealth Games
2014	Glasgow, Scotland	85 kg	108	112	~~115~~	—N/a	135	140	145	—N/a	257	16
