= Matthew Aquino =

Filipino-Japanese basketball player

Matthew Aquino マシュー・アキノ
Kagoshima Rebnise
- Position: Power forward / center
- League: B.League

Personal information
- Born: September 28, 1996 (age 30)
- Listed height: 6 ft 9 in (205 cm)
- Listed weight: 220 lb (100 kg)

Career information
- College: Adamson (2014); NU (2016–2017)
- Playing career: 2019–present

Career history
- 2019–2020: Bacoor City Strikers
- 2020–2021: Pasig Sta. Lucia Realtors
- 2021–2024: Shinshu Brave Warriors
- 2024–2025: Gunma Crane Thunders
- 2025–2026: Toyama Grouses
- 2026–present: Kagoshima Rebnise

Matthew Irvine Marlou Aquino (マシュー・アキノ, Mashiyū Akino; born September 28, 1996) is a Filipino-Japanese professional basketball player for Kagoshima Rebnise of the Japanese B.League.

== Early life and education ==
Aquino was born on September 28, 1996, to Marlou Aquino and Marjorie Sheila Toma-Aquino. He attended Lourdes School of Mandaluyong in Metro Manila, Philippines.

== College career ==
=== Adamson University ===
In college, Aquino first entered Adamson University first playing for the Falcons in the UAAP in Season 77.

=== National University (Philippines) ===
Aquino later moved to the National University. He made his UAAP debut for the NU Bulldogs in Season 79. He played five games for the Bulldogs before being ruled ineligible to suit up for the collegiate side due to residency issues. He was able to represent the Bulldogs in Season 80.

== Amateur career ==
Aquino played alongside his father Marlou for the Bacoor City Strikers in the semiprofessional Maharlika Pilipinas Basketball League (MPBL). Bacoor did not renew his contract, causing Aquino to become a free agent in March 2020. He was later signed in by MPBL club Pasig Sta. Lucia Realtors.

== Professional career ==
In late 2021, Aquino was signed in to play for the Shinshu Brave Warriors of the Japanese B. League. Under league regulations he would be fielded as a local player owing to his Japanese heritage.

On June 16, 2024, Aquino signed with the Gunma Crane Thunders of the B. League.

== Career statistics ==
=== UAAP ===
Year	Team	GP	MPG	FG%	3P%	FT%	RPG	APG	SPG	BPG	PPG
2014-15	Adamson	14	14.1	.345	.286	.143	1.6	.3	.1	0.8	1.6
2016-17	NU	5	12.9	.143	.200	1.000	3.0	.6	-	1.2	2.0
2017-18	NU	13	10.8	.706	.429	.571	3.0	.1	.1	.9	4.8
Career		32	12.6	.440	.292	.500	2.4	.3	.1	.9	3.0

== National team career ==
Aquino has been named part of the Japan national team pool for the first window of the 2023 FIBA Basketball World Cup qualifiers in November 2021. He is initially hesitant since playing for Japan would mean he won't be eligible to play for the Philippines national team but he was encouraged by his father to pursue the chance to play for Japan since it was in the East Asian country where he got an opportunity to play for a national team. He was not named part of the final roster for November 2021 window but was invited to join further training camps in 2022. He made his debut for Japan on February 26, 2022, in the national team's 76–71 win over Chinese Taipei in the World Cup qualifiers.

== Personal life ==
Matthew's father, Marlou Aquino is also a former professional basketball player who played in the Philippine Basketball Association (PBA). Aquino has Japanese heritage, through his maternal grandmother. Aquino often turns to his father and his sister Marla when it comes to making key decisions in his life including his basketball career.
