= Weightlifting at the 2014 Commonwealth Games – Men's 85 kg =

Weightlifting – Men's 85 kg at the 2014 Commonwealth Games
- Venue: Clyde Auditorium
- Dates: 28 July 2014
- Competitors: 20 from 17 nations
- Winning total weight: 335kg

Medalists
gold medal	Richie Patterson	New Zealand
silver medal	Vikas Thakur	India
bronze medal	Pascal Plamondon	Canada

The Men's 85 kg weightlifting event at the 2014 Commonwealth Games took place on 28 July at the Clyde Auditorium, in Glasgow, Scotland. The weightlifter from New Zealand won the gold, with a combined lift of 335 kg.

== Result ==
Rank	Athlete	Snatch (kg)				Clean & Jerk (kg)				Total
Rank	Athlete	1	2	3	Result	1	2	3	Result	Total
1st place, gold medalist(s)	Richie Patterson (NZL)	147	151	~~154~~	151	~~184~~	~~184~~	184	184	335
2nd place, silver medalist(s)	Vikas Thakur (IND)	142	147	150	150	~~179~~	179	183	183	333
3rd place, bronze medalist(s)	Pascal Plamondon (CAN)	~~147~~	147	151	151	~~178~~	178	182	182	333
4	Gideon Aigbefoh (NGR)	142	~~147~~	147	147	170	~~177~~	177	177	324
5	Cyrille Tchatchet II (CMR)	~~135~~	135	140	140	175	~~180~~	~~180~~	175	315
6	Petunu Opeloge (SAM)	135	140	~~143~~	140	172	~~180~~	~~185~~	172	312
7	Siaosi Leuo (SAM)	~~127~~	127	132	132	166	171	~~175~~	171	303
8	Darryl Conrad (CAN)	128	133	~~138~~	133	160	165	~~169~~	165	298
9	Saxon Gregory-Hunt (NZL)	130	~~134~~	~~134~~	130	160	165	~~169~~	165	295
10	Romesh Samarasekara (SRI)	122	126	~~130~~	126	~~162~~	165	~~170~~	165	291
11	David Gorosi (SOL)	115	120	125	125	147	152	155	155	280
12	Habib Muhammad Asghar (PAK)	122	126	128	128	~~151~~	151	~~155~~	155	279
13	Terence Dixie (SEY)	122	~~128~~	~~128~~	122	145	~~152~~	~~152~~	145	267
14	Kalidi Batuusa (UGA)	117	121	~~123~~	121	145	~~151~~	~~151~~	145	266
15	Taubena Tatunga (KIR)	115	~~120~~	~~120~~	115	145	~~151~~	~~151~~	145	260
16	Prince Nyarko (GHA)	108	112	~~115~~	112	135	140	145	145	257
17	Stephen Opondo (KEN)	100	106	~~110~~	106	143	~~147~~	147	147	253
-	Bradley Burrowes (ENG)	140	~~145~~	~~145~~	140	~~155~~	~~155~~	~~155~~	-	DNF
-	Zeke Pullan (NIU)	~~90~~	~~90~~	~~90~~	—N/a					DNF
-	Malek Chamoun (AUS)	~~140~~	~~140~~	~~140~~	—N/a					DNF
