= Anita Fordjour =

Ghanaian wheelchair racer

Personal information
- Born: 1981/82 Kumasi, Ghana

Sport
- Sport: Athletics
Medal record
Wheelchair racing
Representing Ghana
All-Africa Games
Silver medal – second place	2007 Algiers	1,500 m T54
Bronze medal – third place	2007 Algiers	200 m T54
Bronze medal – third place	2011 Maputo	1,500 m T54
Commonwealth Games
Bronze medal – third place	2010 Delhi	1,500 m T54

Anita Fordjour (born 1981/82) is a Ghanaian athlete, who has competed in wheelchair racing. She came third in the 1500 metres T54 event at the 2010 Commonwealth Games, and has won multiple medals at the All-Africa Games.

== Personal life ==
Fordjour is from Kumasi, Ghana. She has two children. At the age of six, Fordjour contracted polio, and lost movement in her legs.

== Career ==
At the age of 20, Fordjour took up wheelchair basketball, before switching to wheelchair racing. In 2003, Fordjour won the 800 metres event at the Ghana-Nigeria Friendly Games for the Physically Challenged in Kumasi. She finished second in the 200 metres and 1500 metres events. At the 2007 All-Africa Games in Algiers, Algeria, Fordjour came second in the 1,500 metres race, and third in the 200 metres race. In 2008, Fordjour won the 400 metres race at the Athletics competition for the Physically Challenged at the Baba Yara Stadium in Kumasi.

Fordjour competed at the 2010 Commonwealth Games, where she finished third in the 1500 metres T54 event, in a time of 4:18.83. Fordjour won a bronze medal in the 1,500 metres event at the 2011 All-Africa Games. Fordjour competed at the 2012 Summer Paralympics in the 100 metres T53 and 200 metres T53 events. She was one of four Ghanaians at the Games, the most athletes Ghana had ever sent to a Paralympic Games at the time. Fordjour finished seventh in both the 100 metres T53 and 200 metres T53 events. At the 2014 Commonwealth Games, Fordjour finished eighth in the 1500 metres T54 event, in a personal best time of 4:11.29.

== Awards ==
In 2010, Fordjour was named Ghana Female Athlete of the Year by the Sport Writers Association of Ghana.
