= Ilgar Mushkiyev =

Azerbaijani judoka (born 1990)

Personal information
- Nationality: Azerbaijani
- Born: 5 October 1990 (age 35) Ganja, Azerbaijan
- Occupation: Judoka
- Height: 168 cm (5 ft 6 in)

Sport
- Country: Azerbaijan
- Sport: Judo
- Weight class: ‍–‍60 kg

Achievements and titles
- Olympic Games: R32 (2012)
- World Champ.: (bronze) (2011)
- European Champ.: (bronze) (2014)
Medal record
Men's judo
Representing Azerbaijan
World Championships
Bronze medal – third place	2011 Paris	‍–‍60 kg
European Championships
Bronze medal – third place	2014 Montpellier	‍–‍60 kg
World Masters
Bronze medal – third place	2011 Baku	‍–‍60 kg
IJF Grand Slam
Silver medal – second place	2016 Paris	‍–‍60 kg
Bronze medal – third place	2012 Moscow	‍–‍60 kg
Bronze medal – third place	2013 Moscow	‍–‍60 kg
Bronze medal – third place	2014 Tyumen	‍–‍60 kg
Bronze medal – third place	2014 Abu Dhabi	‍–‍60 kg
Bronze medal – third place	2016 Tyumen	‍–‍60 kg
IJF Grand Prix
Gold medal – first place	2012 Baku	‍–‍60 kg
Gold medal – first place	2015 Qingdao	‍–‍60 kg
Bronze medal – third place	2014 Budapest	‍–‍60 kg
Bronze medal – third place	2016 Samsun	‍–‍60 kg
European U23 Championships
Bronze medal – third place	2010 Sarajevo	‍–‍60 kg
World Juniors Championships
Silver medal – second place	2009 Paris	‍–‍55 kg
European Junior Championships
Silver medal – second place	2009 Yerevan	‍–‍55 kg

Profile at external databases
- IJF: 1037
- JudoInside.com: 58911
- Updated on 17 July 2023

Ilgar Mushkiyev (born 5 October 1990, in Ganja) is an Azerbaijani judoka. 2-time world award winner, 3-time European award winner, 2-time Grand Prix champion, 2-time world cup winner, 5-time republican champion, best athlete of the year (2011), honored master of sports, and member of the Azerbaijan national team.

Mushkiyev won a bronze medal at the 2011 World Championships in the ‍–‍60 kg division. In the same division, he competed at the 2012 Summer Olympics, but lost in the second round to Hovhannes Davtyan. In 2014, Mushkiyev won a bronze medal at the European Championships.

== Achievements ==
Year	Tournament	Place	Weight class
2011	European Judo Championships	7th	Extralightweight (60 kg)
