= A Lamusi =

Chinese Olympic judoka (born 1989)

Personal information
- Born: 2 June 1989 (age 37) Inner Mongolia, China
- Occupation: Judoka
- Height: 5 ft 7 in (170 cm)
- Weight: 132 lb (60 kg)

Sport
- Sport: Judo
Medal record
Men's Judo
Representing China
Asian Championships
Bronze medal – third place	2012 Tashkent	-60 kg

Profile at external databases
- IJF: 4174
- JudoInside.com: 62489

A Lamusi (Mongolian: Almas; 2 June 1989 in Inner Mongolia) is an ethnic Mongol judoka who represented China in the men's 60 kg category at the 2012 Summer Olympics, he was defeated in the second round by Javier Guédez.
