= Jonah Burt =

Canadian judoka (born 1994)

Personal information
- Full name: Jonah William Burt
- Born: 5 September 1994 (age 31) Ajax, Ontario, Canada
- Height: 6 ft 1 in (185 cm)
- Weight: 81 kg (179 lb)

Sport
- Country: Canada
- Sport: Judo
- Event: Men's 81 kg
Medal record
Men's Judo
Representing Canada
Commonwealth Games
Bronze medal – third place	2014 Glasgow	Men's 81 kg

Jonah William Burt (born 5 September 1994) is a Canadian judoka. He competed in the men's 81 kg event at the 2014 Commonwealth Games where he won a bronze medal.
