= Valtteri Jokinen =

Finnish judoka

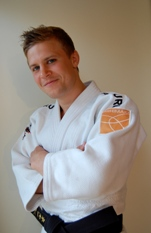

Personal information
- Born: 12 February 1983 (age 43)
- Occupation: Judoka

Sport
- Country: Finland
- Sport: Judo
- Weight class: –60 kg

Achievements and titles
- Olympic Games: R16 (2012)
- World Champ.: R16 (2009, 2010)
- European Champ.: 9th (2004, 2006)
Medal record
Men's judo
Representing Finland
IJF Grand Prix
Bronze medal – third place	2011 Baku	–60 kg

Profile at external databases
- IJF: 460
- JudoInside.com: 13264
- Updated on 2 January 2023

Valtteri Jokinen (born 12 February 1983) is a Finnish judoka who competes in the men's 60 kg category. At the 2012 Summer Olympics, he was defeated in the third round.
