= Bekir Özlü =

Georgian born Turkish judoka

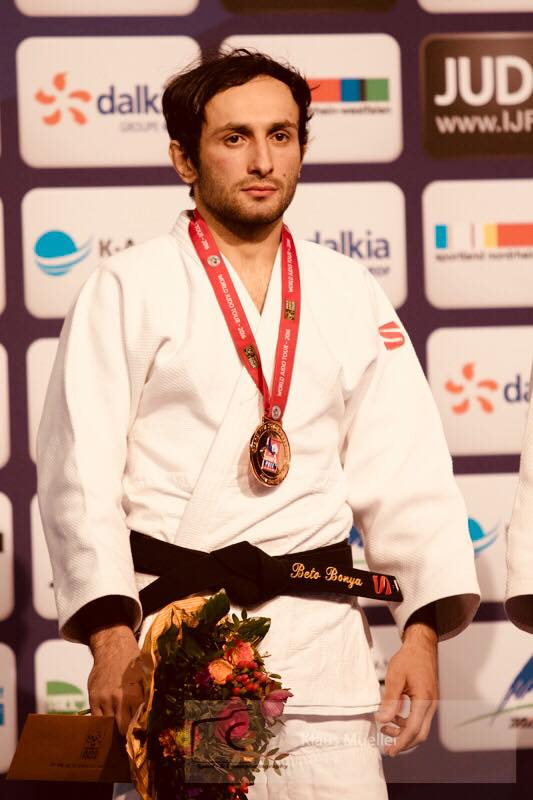

Personal information
- Nationality: Turkish
- Born: Betkil Shukvani; 30 August 1988 (age 37) Mestia, Samegrelo-Zemo Svaneti, Georgian SSR, Soviet Union
- Occupation: Judoka
- Height: 1.62 m (5 ft 4 in)

Sport
- Country: Georgia (2009–13); Turkey (2015–present)
- Sport: Judo
- Weight class: –60 kg
- Club: Kocaeli BB Kağıt SK

Achievements and titles
- Olympic Games: R32 (2012, 2016)
- World Champ.: R32 (2015)
- European Champ.: (silver) (2011)
Medal record
Men's judo
Representing Georgia
European Championships
Silver medal – second place	2011 Istanbul	–60 kg
IJF Grand Slam
Gold medal – first place	2012 Rio de Janeiro	–60 kg
IJF Grand Prix
Bronze medal – third place	2012 Düsseldorf	–60 kg
European Junior Championships
Bronze medal – third place	2006 Tallinn	–60 kg
European Cadet Championships
Silver medal – second place	2004 Rotterdam	–55 kg
Representing Turkey
IJF Grand Prix
Gold medal – first place	2016 Samsun	–60 kg
Gold medal – first place	2017 The Hague	–60 kg
Silver medal – second place	2016 Havana	–60 kg
Silver medal – second place	2017 Antalya	–60 kg
Silver medal – second place	2018 Agadir	–60 kg
Bronze medal – third place	2016 Düsseldorf	–60 kg
Bronze medal – third place	2017 Zagreb	–60 kg
Mediterranean Games
Bronze medal – third place	2018 Tarragona	–60 kg

Profile at external databases
- IJF: 19202, 2448
- JudoInside.com: 33757
- Updated on 15 November 2022

Bekir Özlü (born Betkili Shukvani, Georgian: ბეთქილ შუკვანი, on 30 August 1988 in Mestia, Samegrelo-Zemo Svaneti, Georgia) is an Olympian Georgian-born Turkish judoka competing in the 60 kg division. The 1.62 m (5 ft 4 in) tall sportsman is a member of Kocaeli BB Kağıt SK. Bekir Ozlu née Betkil Shukvani was born in Georgia but has represented Turkey since 2015. For Georgia he won European medals in U17 and U20 and silver at the Senior European Championship in 2011 in Istanbul. He won the European team title with Georgia in 2007. He won World Cups since 2011 and the Grand Slam of Rio in 2012. Ozlu won gold at the European Open in Minsk in 2017. He captured a bronze medal at the Grand Prix in Zagreb in 2017. Ozlu took gold at the Grand Prix The Hague in 2017.

== In Georgia ==
In 2011, he took the silver medal at the European Judo Championships held in Istanbul, Turkey.

He represented his country at the 2012 Summer Olympics. He was defeated in the second round.

== In Turkey ==
In 2015, he switched allegiance to Turkey, and adopted the Turkish given name and surname.

Özlü represented Turkey at the 2015 Grand Prix in Düsseldorf, Germany, and took the bronze medal. He captured the gold medal at the 2015 European Judo Open in Cluj-Napoca, Romania. He also competed at the 2016 Summer Olympics. In 2017, he won gold at the European Open in Minsk.

== Competitive record ==
Judo Record
Total	218
Wins	144
by Ippon	90
Losses	74
by Ippon	30

(as of 19 July 2018)
