= Kenny Godoy =

Honduran Olympic judoka

Personal information
- Born: 6 January 1986 (age 39); Tegucigalpa, Honduras
- Occupation: Judoka

Sport
- Sport: Judo

Kenny Godoy (born 6 January 1986) is a Honduran judoka who competes in the men's 60 kg category. At the 2012 Summer Olympics, he was defeated in the first round.
