= Boas Munyonga =

Zambian judoka

Boas Munyonga (born December 15, 1980, in Ndola) is a Zambian judoka. At the 2014 Commonwealth Games in Glasgow, Munyonga won Bronze in 81 kg men's category. He competed in the men's 81 kg event at the 2012 Summer Olympics and was eliminated in the second round by Takahiro Nakai.
