= David Gorosi =

Solomon Islands weightlifter

Personal information
- Full name: David Gorosi
- Born: 29 December 1988 (age 37)
- Weight: 83.86 kg (184.9 lb)

Sport
- Country: Solomon Islands
- Sport: Weightlifting
- Weight class: 85 kg
- Team: National team
- Updated on 19 October 2016

David Gorosi (born 29 December 1988) is a Solomon Islands male weightlifter, competing in the 85 kg category and representing Solomon Islands at international competitions. He won the silver medal at the 2013 Pacific Mini Games. He participated at the 2014 Commonwealth Games in the 85 kg event.

== Major competitions ==
Year	Venue	Weight	Snatch (kg)				Clean & Jerk (kg)				Total	Rank
Year	Venue	Weight	1	2	3	Rank	1	2	3	Rank	Total	Rank
Commonwealth Games
2014	Glasgow, Scotland	85 kg	115	120	125	—N/a	147	152	155	—N/a	280	11
