= Choi Min-ho (judoka) =

South Korean judoka (born 1980)

Personal information
- Born: 18 August 1980 (age 45)
- Occupation: Judoka

Korean name
- Hangul: 최민호
- Hanja: 崔敏浩
- RR: Choe Minho
- MR: Ch'oe Minho

Sport
- Country: South Korea
- Sport: Judo
- Weight class: –60 kg, –66 kg

Achievements and titles
- Olympic Games: (gold) (2008)
- World Champ.: (2003)
- Asian Champ.: (silver) (2001, 2012)
Medal record
Men's judo
Representing South Korea
Olympic Games
Gold medal – first place	2008 Beijing	‍–‍60 kg
Bronze medal – third place	2004 Athens	‍–‍60 kg
World Championships
Gold medal – first place	2003 Osaka	‍–‍60 kg
Bronze medal – third place	2007 Rio de Janeiro	‍–‍60 kg
Asian Games
Bronze medal – third place	2002 Busan	‍–‍60 kg
Bronze medal – third place	2010 Guangzhou	‍–‍60 kg
Asian Championships
Silver medal – second place	2001 Ulaanbaatar	‍–‍60 kg
Silver medal – second place	2012 Tashkent	‍–‍66 kg
Bronze medal – third place	2007 Kuwait City	‍–‍60 kg
IJF Grand Prix
Bronze medal – third place	2012 Düsseldorf	‍–‍66 kg
World Juniors Championships
Bronze medal – third place	1998 Cali	‍–‍60 kg
Summer Universiade
Silver medal – second place	1999 Palma de Mallorca	‍–‍60 kg
Bronze medal – third place	2001 Beijing	‍–‍60 kg

Profile at external databases
- IJF: 58
- JudoInside.com: 6221
- Updated on 28 May 2023

Choi Min-ho (Korean: 최민호; Korean pronunciation: [tɕʰwe̞.min.ɦo]; born 18 August 1980) is a South Korean judoka. He was born in Gimcheon, Gyeongsangbuk-do, South Korea.

== Career ==
He competed in the 2004 Summer Olympics where he won the bronze medal and defeated then world champion Craig Fallon. He also competed in the 2008 Summer Olympics, where he won the gold medal in the 60 kg extra-lightweight category. In Beijing, he ended all 5 of his matches by Ippon and defeated former European champion Ludwig Paischer in the final for the gold medal.

Choi was voted as the 2008 Best Judoka of the Year by L´Esprit du Judo magazine of France.
