= Razak Abugiri =

Ghanaian judoka

Personal information
- Nationality: Ghanaian
- Born: 22 July 1988 (age 37) Accra, Ghana
- Height: 5 ft 4 in (163 cm)
- Weight: 60 kg (130 lb)

Sport
- Sport: Judo
- Event: Men's 60 kg
Medal record
Representing Ghana
Men's Judo
Commonwealth Games
Bronze medal – third place	2014 Glasgow	Men's 60 kg
- Updated on 7 October 2014

Razak Abugiri (born 22 July 1988) is a Ghanaian judoka. He competed in the men's 60 kg event at the 2014 Commonwealth Games where he won a bronze medal. He now works as a fumigation technician for Trical Australia. He is well known by his nickname “The Ghanaian General”.
