= Neuso Sigauque =

Mozambican judoka

Neuso Sigauque (born in Maputo) is a Mozambican judoka who competes in the men's 60 kg category. At the 2012 Summer Olympics, he was defeated in the second round by Tony Lomo. At the 2014 Commonwealth Games, he reached the bronze medal match, which he lost to Ashley McKenzie.
