= Hiroaki Hiraoka =

Japanese judoka (born 1985)

Personal information
- Born: 6 February 1985 (age 41)
- Occupation: Judoka

Sport
- Country: Japan
- Sport: Judo
- Weight class: –60 kg

Achievements and titles
- Olympic Games: (silver) (2012)
- World Champ.: (silver) (2009, 2011)
- Asian Champ.: (gold) (2008)
Medal record
Men's judo
Representing Japan
Olympic Games
Silver medal – second place	2012 London	‍–‍60 kg
World Championships
Silver medal – second place	2009 Rotterdam	‍–‍60 kg
Silver medal – second place	2011 Paris	‍–‍60 kg
Bronze medal – third place	2010 Tokyo	‍–‍60 kg
Asian Games
Silver medal – second place	2010 Guangzhou	‍–‍60 kg
Asian Championships
Gold medal – first place	2008 Jeju	‍–‍60 kg
World Masters
Silver medal – second place	2010 Suwon	‍–‍60 kg
Bronze medal – third place	2012 Almaty	‍–‍60 kg
IJF Grand Slam
Gold medal – first place	2010 Rio de Janeiro	‍–‍60 kg
Silver medal – second place	2009 Rio de Janeiro	‍–‍60 kg
Silver medal – second place	2009 Tokyo	‍–‍60 kg
Bronze medal – third place	2011 Rio de Janeiro	‍–‍60 kg
Bronze medal – third place	2011 Tokyo	‍–‍60 kg
IJF Grand Prix
Gold medal – first place	2011 Düsseldorf	‍–‍60 kg
Silver medal – second place	2010 Düsseldorf	‍–‍60 kg
Bronze medal – third place	2009 Hamburg	‍–‍60 kg
World Juniors Championships
Bronze medal – third place	2004 Budapest	‍–‍60 kg
Asian Junior Championships
Gold medal – first place	2003 Macau	‍–‍60 kg

Profile at external databases
- IJF: 30
- JudoInside.com: 27008
- Updated on 25 May 2023

Hiroaki Hiraoka (平岡 拓晃, Hiraoka Hiroaki; born 6 February 1985 in Hiroshima City) is a Japanese judoka. He won a silver medal at the 2009 World Judo Championships and the 2011 World Championships and a bronze medal at the 2010 World Judo Championships.

Hiroka also won a silver medal at the 2012 Summer Olympics at London, in the men's under 60 kg extra-lightweight category.
