= Navjot Chana =

Indian Judoka

Personal information
- Born: 24 November 1983 (age 42) Hoshiarpur, India

Sport
- Sport: Judo
Medal record
Representing India
Commonwealth Games
Silver medal – second place	2014 Glasgow	–60 kg

Navjot Chana (born 24 November 1983) is an Indian Judo Player who won silver medal in the men's 60 kg weight class at the 2014 Commonwealth Games at Glasgow. He hails from Hoshiarpur district of Punjab state of India. Chana is employed with Punjab Police Chana defeated South Africa's Daniel Le Grange in the semi-final meeting. He had earlier defeated 23-year-old Tom Pappas of Australia in quarter-final.
