= Yerkebulan Kossayev =

Kazakhstani judoka (born 1988)

Personal information
- Born: 30 October 1988 (age 37)
- Occupation: Judoka

Sport
- Country: Kazakhstan
- Sport: Judo
- Weight class: ‍–‍60 kg

Achievements and titles
- Olympic Games: R16 (2012)
- World Champ.: R32 (2011)
- Asian Champ.: (bronze) (2011)
Medal record
Men's judo
Representing Kazakhstan
Asian Championships
Bronze medal – third place	2011 Abu Dhabi	‍–‍60 kg
IJF Grand Prix
Gold medal – first place	2011 Abu Dhabi	‍–‍60 kg
Silver medal – second place	2014 Tbilisi	‍–‍60 kg

Profile at external databases
- IJF: 2334
- JudoInside.com: 57369
- Updated on 26 December 2022

Yerkebulan Kossayev (born 30 October 1988 in Semey) is a Kazakhstani judoka who competes in the men's 60 kg category. At the 2012 Summer Olympics, he was defeated in the third round.

Kossayev competed in the men's 60 kg event at the 2014 World Judo Championships held in Chelyabinsk, Russia.
