= Elio Verde =

Italian judoka (born 1987)

Personal information
- Born: 10 September 1987 (age 38) Trentola-Ducenta, Italy
- Occupation: Judoka

Sport
- Country: Italy
- Sport: Judo
- Weight class: ‍–‍60 kg, ‍–‍66 kg
- Club: Fiamme Oro

Achievements and titles
- Olympic Games: 5th (2012)
- World Champ.: (bronze) (2009)
- European Champ.: (bronze) (2010, 2011)
Medal record
Men's judo
Representing Italy
World Championships
Bronze medal – third place	2009 Rotterdam	‍–‍60 kg
European Championships
Bronze medal – third place	2010 Vienna	‍–‍60 kg
Bronze medal – third place	2011 Istanbul	‍–‍60 kg
IJF Grand Slam
Silver medal – second place	2010 Rio de Janeiro	‍–‍66 kg
Silver medal – second place	2011 Rio de Janeiro	‍–‍60 kg
Bronze medal – third place	2010 Moscow	‍–‍60 kg
IJF Grand Prix
Bronze medal – third place	2010 Rotterdam	‍–‍60 kg
Bronze medal – third place	2011 Düsseldorf	‍–‍60 kg
Bronze medal – third place	2016 Havana	‍–‍66 kg
European U23 Championships
Silver medal – second place	2008 Zagreb	‍–‍60 kg
Mediterranean Games
Gold medal – first place	2009 Pescara	‍–‍60 kg

Profile at external databases
- IJF: 654
- JudoInside.com: 30052
- Updated on 13 August 2023

Elio Verde (born 10 September 1987, in Trentola-Ducenta) is an Italian judoka who competes in the men's 66 kg (146 lb) category. At the 2012 Summer Olympics, he was defeated in the semi-finals.
