= Tony Lomo =

Solomon Islands judoka

Personal information
- Born: 17 December 1983 (age 42)
- Occupation: Judoka

Sport
- Country: Solomon Islands
- Sport: Judo
- Weight class: 60 kg

Profile at external databases
- IJF: 856
- JudoInside.com: 47608

Tony Lomo (born 17 December 1983 in Takwa) is a Solomon Islands judoka who competes in the men's 60 kg category.

At the 2012 Summer Olympics, he was defeated in the third round by Sofiane Milous.

At the 2014 Commonwealth Games, he lost to Ghana's Razak Abugiri in the first round.
