= 2010 World Judo Championships – Men's 73 kg =

Judo competition

Judo Men's 73 kg at the 2010 World Judo Championships
- Venue: Yoyogi National Gymnasium
- Location: Tokyo, Japan
- Date: 11 September 2010
- Competitors: 82 from 59 nations

Medalists
| gold medal | Hiroyuki Akimoto (1st title) | Japan |
| silver medal | Dex Elmont | Netherlands |
| bronze medal | Wang Ki-Chun | South Korea |
| bronze medal | Yasuhiro Awano | Japan |

Competition at external databases
- Links: IJF • JudoInside

The Men's -73 kg competition at the 2010 World Judo Championships was held at 11 September at the Yoyogi National Gymnasium in Tokyo, Japan. 82 competitors contested for the medals, being split in 4 Pools where the winner advanced to the medal round.

== Pool A ==
- Last 32 fights:
  - (South Korea) Wang Ki-Chun 101 vs. (Estonia) Künter Rothberg 000
  - (Poland) Krzysztof Wiłkomirski 100 vs. (Mozambique) Edson Madeira 000
  - (Spain) Kiyoshi Uematsu 001 vs. (Switzerland) David Papaux 000
  - (Canada) Nicholas Tritton 000 vs. (United States) Nicholas Delpopolo 110
  - (Iceland) Kristjan Jonsson 100 vs. (Fiji) Samuela Mateiyalona 000

First Round
(South Korea) Wang Ki-Chun | 110
(Turkmenistan) Ovezmuhammet Atalyev | 000
(Saudi Arabia) Yassir Ayad | 000
(Poland) Krzysztof Wiłkomirski | 100
(Spain) Kiyoshi Uematsu | 000
(Portugal) Andre Alves | 001
(Palestine) Maher Abu Rmilah | 001
(Hong Kong) Wu Chi Hang | 000
(United States) Nicholas Delpopolo | 100
(Iraq) Ahmed Salman | 000
(Brazil) Bruno Mendonca | 001
(China) Liu Wei | 011
(France) Ugo Legrand | 100
(Romania) Costel Danculea | 000
(Thailand) Achilleus Ralli | 100
(Iceland) Kristjan Jonsson | 000

Quarterfinals
(South Korea) Wang Ki-Chun | 100
(Poland) Krzysztof Wiłkomirski | 000
(Portugal) Andre Alves | 020
(Palestine) Maher Abu Rmilah | 000
(United States) Nicholas Delpopolo | 100
(China) Liu Wei | 000
(France) Ugo Legrand | 010
(Thailand) Achilleus Ralli | 000

Semifinals
(South Korea) Wang Ki-Chun | 001
(Portugal) Andre Alves | 000
(United States) Nicholas Delpopolo | 000
(France) Ugo Legrand | 101

Final
(South Korea) Wang Ki-Chun | 101
(France) Ugo Legrand | 001

== Pool B ==
- Last 32 fights:
  - (Iran) Ali Maloumat 021 vs. (Uzbekistan) Mirali Sharipov 000
  - (Belgium) Jean Bottieau 020 vs. (Samoa) Abner Waterhouse 000
  - (Japan) Yasuhiro Awano 101 vs. (Russia) Batradz Kaytmazov 000
  - (Ukraine) Dmytro Sheretov 000 vs. (Hungary) Sandor Taraba 100
  - (Ghana) Emmanuel Nartey 110 vs. (United Arab Emirates) Khalifa Al Qubaisi 000

First Round
(Japan) Hiroyuki Akimoto | 100
(Iran) Ali Maloumat | 000
(Moldova) Marcel Trudov | 000
(Germany) Christopher Völk | 100
(Yemen) Zeyad Mater | 000
(Georgia (country)) Nugzar Tatalashvili | 110
(Belgium) Jean Bottieau | 000
(Czech Republic) Jaromír Ježek | 011
(Japan) Yasuhiro Awano | 101
(India) Ramashrey Yadav | 000
(Hungary) Sandor Taraba | 000
(Kazakhstan) Rashit Kulbayev | 020
(Australia) Dennis Iverson | 000
(Tajikistan) Saidjalol Saidov | 001
(Mongolia) Purevdorj Ganbold | 000
(Ghana) Emmanuel Nartey | 021

Quarterfinals
(Japan) Hiroyuki Akimoto | 001
(Germany) Christopher Völk | 000
(Georgia (country)) Nugzar Tatalashvili | 100
(Czech Republic) Jaromír Ježek | 010
(Japan) Yasuhiro Awano | 101
(Kazakhstan) Rashit Kulbayev | 000
(Tajikistan) Saidjalol Saidov | 100
(Ghana) Emmanuel Nartey | 000

Semifinals
(Japan) Hiroyuki Akimoto | 101
(Georgia (country)) Nugzar Tatalashvili | 000
(Japan) Yasuhiro Awano | 012
(Tajikistan) Saidjalol Saidov | 000

Final
(Japan) Hiroyuki Akimoto | 100
(Japan) Yasuhiro Awano | 000

== Pool C ==
- Last 32 fights:
  - (South Korea) Bang Gui-Man 102 vs. (Kazakhstan) Rinat Ibragimov 000
  - (Ukraine) Volodymyr Soroka 100 vs. (United Kingdom) Daniel Williams 000
  - (China) Jia Yitao 000 vs. (Egypt) Hussein Hafiz 100
  - (Mongolia) Nyam Sainjargal 100 vs. (Australia) Nikola Pejic 000

First Round
(South Korea) Bang Gui-Man | 010
(Tajikistan) Rasul Boqiev | 000
(Georgia (country)) Zaza Kedelashvili | 100
(Algeria) Mustapha Boulemia | 000
(Hong Kong) Cheung Chi Yip | 000
(Barbados) Kyle Maxwell | 020
(Kyrgyzstan) Azat Kubakaev | 010
(New Zealand) Choi Woo Su | 001
(Ukraine) Volodymyr Soroka | 100
(Papua New Guinea) Kinsley Vui | 000
(Iceland) Eyjofur Eyfells | 001
(Egypt) Hussein Hafiz | 012
(Greece) Diamantis Tsouparis | 010
(Samoa) Aleni Smith | 001
(Switzerland) Martin Nietlispach | 000
(Mongolia) Sainjargalyn Nyam-Ochir | 001

Quarterfinals
(South Korea) Bang Gui-Man | 000
(Georgia (country)) Zaza Kedelashvili | 020
(Barbados) Kyle Maxwell | 000
(Kyrgyzstan) Azat Kubakaev | 100
(Ukraine) Volodymyr Soroka | 001
(Egypt) Hussein Hafiz | 100
(Greece) Diamantis Tsouparis | 000
(Mongolia) Sainjargalyn Nyam-Ochir | 100

Semifinals
(Georgia (country)) Zaza Kedelashvili | 011
(Kyrgyzstan) Azat Kubakaev | 020
(Egypt) Hussein Hafiz | 000
(Mongolia) Sainjargalyn Nyam-Ochir | 100

Final
(Kyrgyzstan) Azat Kubakaev | 000
(Mongolia) Sainjargalyn Nyam-Ochir | 100

== Pool D ==
- Last 32 fights:
  - (Belgium) Dirk Van Tichelt 000 vs. (Poland) Tomasz Adamiec 100
  - (Afghanistan) Sayed Hussaini 000 vs. (Azerbaijan) Renat Mirzaliyev 100
  - (Turkmenistan) Arslan Nurmuhammedov 000 vs. (United States) Michael Eldred 100
  - Fatos Tabaku 000 vs. (Uzbekistan) Navruz Jurakobilov 101

First Round
(Poland) Tomasz Adamiec | 100
(Cyprus) Alekos Lazarou | 000
(Netherlands) Dex Elmont | 100
(Solomon Islands) Abraham Morgan | 000
(Turkey) Sezer Huysuz | 000
(Portugal) Joao Pina | 001
(France) Benjamin Darbelet | 000
(Azerbaijan) Renat Mirzaliyev | 100
(Russia) Mansur Isaev | 020
(American Samoa) Tasele Scanlan | 000
(Spain) Miguel Romero | 000
(United States) Michael Eldred | 001
(Uzbekistan) Navruz Jurakobilov | 000
(Hungary) Attila Ungvari | 100
(South Africa) Gideon van Zyl | 000
(Morocco) Anass Farih | 101

Quarterfinals
(Poland) Tomasz Adamiec | 000
(Netherlands) Dex Elmont | 001
(Portugal) Joao Pina | 010
(Azerbaijan) Renat Mirzaliyev | 000
(Russia) Mansur Isaev | 001
(United States) Michael Eldred | 000
(Hungary) Attila Ungvari | 100
(Morocco) Anass Farih | 000

Semifinals
(Netherlands) Dex Elmont | 010
(Portugal) Joao Pina | 000
(Russia) Mansur Isaev | 010
(Hungary) Attila Ungvari | 001

Final
(Netherlands) Dex Elmont | 100
(Russia) Mansur Isaev | 000

== Repechage ==
| Repechage | | Third place |
| (France) Ugo Legrand | 000 |
| (Japan) Yasuhiro Awano | 002 | (Japan) Yasuhiro Awano | 100 |
| | | (Mongolia) Sainjargalyn Nyam-Ochir | 000 |

| Repechage | | Third place |
| (Kyrgyzstan) Azat Kubakaev | 000 |
| (Russia) Mansur Isaev | 100 | (Russia) Mansur Isaev | 010 |
| | | (South Korea) Wang Ki-Chun | 012 |

== Finals ==
Semi-finals
(South Korea) Wang Ki-Chun | 000
(Japan) Hiroyuki Akimoto | 000
(Mongolia) Sainjargalyn Nyam-Ochir | 000
(Netherlands) Dex Elmont | 100

Final
(Japan) Hiroyuki Akimoto | 100
(Netherlands) Dex Elmont | 000
