= 2011 World Judo Championships – Men's 73 kg =

Judo competition

Judo Men's 73 kg at the 2011 World Judo Championships
- Venue: Accor Arena
- Location: Paris, France
- Date: 24 August 2011
- Competitors: 90 from 68 nations

Medalists
gold medal	Riki Nakaya (1st title)	Japan
silver medal	Dex Elmont	Netherlands
bronze medal	Navruz Jurakobilov	Uzbekistan
bronze medal	Ugo Legrand	France

Competition at external databases
- Links: IJF • JudoInside

The men's 73 kg competition of the 2011 World Judo Championships was held on August 24.

== Medalists ==
Gold	Silver	Bronze
Riki Nakaya (JPN)	Dex Elmont (NED)	Navruz Jurakobilov (UZB); Ugo Legrand (FRA)

== Results ==
=== Pool A ===
First round fights

	Score	
Wang Ki-Chun (South Korea)	100–000	(Italy) Giovanni di Cristo
Seydou Traoré (Mali)	000–101	(Colombia) Derian Castro
Eldar Zarpikanov (Kazakhstan)	100–000	(India) Navdeep Chana
Hussein Hafiz (Egypt)	100–001	(Cameroon) Bernard Sylvain Mvondoetoga
Victor Scvortov (Moldova)	001–100	(Switzerland) David Papaux
Nikola Pejic (Australia)	000–100	(United States) Michael Eldred
Kyle Maxwell (Barbados)	000–100	(Saudi Arabia) Yassir Ayad

Second Round
(South Korea) Ki-Chun Wang	100
(Mongolia) Odbayar Ganbaatar	000
(Slovenia) Sašo Jereb	100
(Greece) Victor Karampourniotis	000
(Colombia) Derian Castro	000
(France) Ugo Legrand	100
(Kazakhstan) Eldar Zarpikanov	110
(Cape Verde) Mario Camoes	000
(Russia) Murat Kodzokov	100
(Egypt) Hussein Hafiz	000
(Switzerland) David Papaux	000
(Uzbekistan) Navruz Jurakobilov	001
(United States) Michael Eldred	100
(North Korea) Kim Chol-Su	000

Quarterfinals
(South Korea) Ki-Chun Wang	101
(Slovenia) Sašo Jereb	000
(France) Ugo Legrand	001
(Kazakhstan) Eldar Zarpikanov	000
(Russia) Murat Kodzokov	000
(Uzbekistan) Navruz Jurakobilov	100
(United States) Michael Eldred	101
(Saudi Arabia) Yassir Ayad	000

Semifinals
(South Korea) Ki-Chun Wang	000
(France) Ugo Legrand	100
(Uzbekistan) Navruz Jurakobilov	101
(United States) Michael Eldred	000

Final
(France) Ugo Legrand	001
(Uzbekistan) Navruz Jurakobilov	000

=== Pool B ===
First round fights

	Score	
Dex Elmont (Netherlands)	100–000	(Turkey) Sezer Huysuz
Liu Wei (China)	101–000	(Haiti) Abdias Philippe Lamour
Edson Madeira (Mozambique)	100–000	(Nauru) Sled Dowabobo
Alisher Mantobetov (Kyrgyzstan)	000–100	(Ukraine) Volodymyr Soroka
Henrique Jaou (Angola)	000–100	(Poland) Tomasz Adamiec
Mac Leon Paulin (Mauritius)	000–100	(Azerbaijan) Renat Mirzaliyev

Second Round
(Netherlands) Dex Elmont	100
(Georgia (country)) Nugzar Tatalshvili	000
(China) Liu Wei	101
(Samoa) Abner Waterhouse	000
(Hong Kong) Cheung Chi Yip	001
(Mozambique) Edson Madeira	000
(Turkmenistan) Arslan Nurmuhammedov	000
(Venezuela) Antonio Rivas	110
(Belgium) Dirk Van Tichelt	001
(Iran) Ali Maloumat	000
(Ukraine) Volodymyr Soroka	000
(Ghana) Emmanuel Nartey	100
(Israel) Soso Palelashvili	000
(Poland) Tomasz Adamiec	001
(Thailand) Achilleus Ralli	000
(Azerbaijan) Renat Mirzaliyev	110

Quarterfinals
(Netherlands) Dex Elmont	001
(China) Liu Wei	000
(Hong Kong) Cheung Chi Yip	000
(Venezuela) Antonio Rivas	110
(Belgium) Dirk Van Tichelt	001
(Ghana) Emmanuel Nartey	000
(Poland) Tomasz Adamiec	100
(Azerbaijan) Renat Mirzaliyev	000

Semifinals
(Netherlands) Dex Elmont	100
(Venezuela) Antonio Rivas	000
(Belgium) Dirk Van Tichelt	001
(Poland) Tomasz Adamiec	000

Final
(Netherlands) Dex Elmont	100
(Belgium) Dirk Van Tichelt	000

=== Pool C ===
First round fights

	Score	
Riki Nakaya (Japan)	101–000	(Samoa) Aleni Smith
Mohamed Camara (Mali)	100–000	(Australia) Benjamin Donegan
Nyam-Ochir Sainjargal (Mongolia)	101–001	(Bosnia and Herzegovina) Mitar Mrdić
Andrea Regis (Italy)	010–000	(Tajikistan) Rasul Boqiev
Zeng Qingdong (China)	000–101	(Turkey) Hasan Vanlıoğlu
Rinat Ibragimov (Kazakhstan)	010–000	(Serbia) Miloš Mijalković
Anton Tyshchenko (Ukraine)	003–000	(Greece) Grigorios Nazarov

Second Round
(Japan) Riki Nakaya	101
(Canada) Nicholas Tritton	000
(Yemen) Zeyad Mater	000
(Mali) Mohamed Camara	001
(Mongolia) Nyam-Ochir Sainjargal	010
(Moldova) Marcel Trudov	000
(Italy) Andrea Regis	001
(Belarus) Aliaksei Ramanchyk	000
(Portugal) João Pina	101
(Turkey) Hasan Vanlıoğlu	001
(Kyrgyzstan) Azat Kubakaev	000
(Austria) Peter Scharinger	010
(Kazakhstan) Rinat Ibragimov	101
(Mauritius) Jean Yves Boodhoo	000
(Nigeria) Abbas Salihu	000
(Ukraine) Anton Tyshchenko	111

Quarterfinals
(Japan) Riki Nakaya	111
(Mali) Mohamed Camara	000
(Mongolia) Nyam-Ochir Sainjargal	001
(Italy) Andrea Regis	000
(Portugal) João Pina	011
(Austria) Peter Scharinger	000
(Kazakhstan) Rinat Ibragimov	100
(Ukraine) Anton Tyshchenko	000

Semifinals
(Japan) Riki Nakaya	100
(Mongolia) Nyam-Ochir Sainjargal	000
(Portugal) João Pina	000
(Kazakhstan) Rinat Ibragimov	100

Final
(Japan) Riki Nakaya	100
(Kazakhstan) Rinat Ibragimov	000

=== Pool D ===
First round fights

	Score	
Hiroyuki Akimoto (Japan)	100–000	(Cuba) Ronald Girones
Alekos Lazarou (Cyprus)	000–011	(Spain) Kiyoshi Uematsu
Künter Rothberg (Estonia)	100–000	(South Korea) Koo Hwan
Bruno Mendonca (Brazil)	010–000	(Uzbekistan) Mirali Sharipov
Tengizi Paposhvili (Georgia (country))	110–000	(Guatemala) Juan Mejia de la Roca
Christopher Völk (Germany)	000–102	(France) Benjamin Darbelet
Khalifa Al Qubaisi (United Arab Emirates)	000–100	(Czech Republic) Jaromír Ježek

Second Round
(Japan) Hiroyuki Akimoto	100
(Papua New Guinea) Kinsley Vui	000
(Poland) Krzysztof Wiłkomirski	000
(Spain) Kiyoshi Uematsu	001
(Estonia) Künter Rothberg	100
(Kenya) Isaac Kinyanjui	000
(Brazil) Bruno Mendonca	001
(Romania) Adrian Nicolae Merge	000
(Russia) Mansur Isaev	100
(United States) Nicholas Delpopolo	000
(Georgia (country)) Tengizi Paposhvili	001
(United Kingdom) Daniel Williams	010
(France) Benjamin Darbelet	100
(Cape Verde) Magner Mendes	000
(New Zealand) Lee Calder	000
(Czech Republic) Jaromír Ježek	101

Quarterfinals
(Japan) Hiroyuki Akimoto	111
(Spain) Kiyoshi Uematsu	000
(Estonia) Künter Rothberg	101
(Brazil) Bruno Mendonca	000
(Russia) Mansur Isaev	001
(United Kingdom) Daniel Williams	000
(France) Benjamin Darbelet	010
(Czech Republic) Jaromír Ježek	000

Semifinals
(Japan) Hiroyuki Akimoto	112
(Estonia) Künter Rothberg	010
(Russia) Mansur Isaev	111
(France) Benjamin Darbelet	010

Final
(Japan) Hiroyuki Akimoto	001
(Russia) Mansur Isaev	000

=== Repechage ===
Repechage		Third place
(Uzbekistan) Navruz Jurakobilov	010
(Belgium) Dirk Van Tichelt	000	(Uzbekistan) Navruz Jurakobilov	010
		(Japan) Hiroyuki Akimoto	001

Repechage		Third place
(Kazakhstan) Rinat Ibragimov	001
(Russia) Mansur Isaev	000	(Kazakhstan) Rinat Ibragimov	000
		(France) Ugo Legrand	001

=== Finals ===
Semi-finals
(France) Ugo Legrand	000
(Netherlands) Dex Elmont	000
(Japan) Riki Nakaya	010
(Japan) Hiroyuki Akimoto	000

Final
(Netherlands) Dex Elmont	000
(Japan) Riki Nakaya	001
