= 2013 World Judo Championships – Men's 73 kg =

Judo competition

Judo Men's 73 kg at the 2013 World Judo Championships
- Venue: Ginásio do Maracanãzinho
- Location: Rio de Janeiro, Brazil
- Date: 28 August 2013
- Competitors: 78 from 61 nations

Medalists
gold medal	Shohei Ono (1st title)	Japan
silver medal	Ugo Legrand	France
bronze medal	Dirk Van Tichelt	Belgium
bronze medal	Dex Elmont	Netherlands

Competition at external databases
- Links: IJF • JudoInside

The men's 73 kg competition of the 2013 World Judo Championships was held on August 28.

== Medalists ==
Gold	Silver	Bronze
Shohei Ono (JPN)	Ugo Legrand (FRA)	Dirk Van Tichelt (BEL); Dex Elmont (NED)

== Results ==
=== Pool A ===
First round fights

	Score	
Etienne Briand (Canada)	000–100	(North Korea) Hong Kuk-Hyon
David Kratsch (Iceland)	000–101	(Kyrgyzstan) Azat Kubakaev
Edson Madeira (Mozambique)	000–100	(Chinese Taipei) Huang Chun-ta

Second Round
(Mongolia) Sainjargalyn Nyam-Ochir	100
(Ghana) Emmanuel Nartey	000
(North Korea) Hong Kuk-Hyon	110
(Italy) Enrico Parlati	000
(Costa Rica) Osman Murillo Segura	010
(Republic of Ireland) Eoin Fleming	000
(Dominican Republic) Lwilli Santana	001
(Cameroon) Joseph Hell Bapou	000
(Japan) Riki Nakaya	100
(Kyrgyzstan) Azat Kubakaev	000
(Ukraine) Volodymyr Soroka	100
(New Zealand) Adrian Leat	000
(Spain) Javier Ramírez	000
(Chinese Taipei) Huang Chun-ta	100
(United Arab Emirates) Victor Scvortov	000
(Iran) Saeid Mollaei	000

Quarterfinals
(Mongolia) Sainjargalyn Nyam-Ochir	100
(North Korea) Hong Kuk-Hyon	000
(Costa Rica) Osman Murillo Segura	000
(Dominican Republic) Lwilli Santana	001
(Japan) Riki Nakaya	100
(Ukraine) Volodymyr Soroka	000
(Chinese Taipei) Huang Chun-ta	100
(Iran) Saeid Mollaei	000

Semifinals
(Mongolia) Sainjargalyn Nyam-Ochir	100
(Dominican Republic) Lwilli Santana	000
(Japan) Riki Nakaya	010
(Chinese Taipei) Huang Chun-ta	000

Final
(Mongolia) Sainjargalyn Nyam-Ochir	100
(Japan) Riki Nakaya	000

=== Pool B ===
First round fights

	Score	
Isaac Kinyanjui (Kenya)	000–100	(France) Ugo Legrand
Viktor Karampourniotis (Greece)	000–001	(Niger) Ahmed Goumar
Tomas Bringas (Chile)	000–101	(Georgia (country)) Nugzari Tatalashvili
Andre Alves (Portugal)	000–100	(Israel) Sagi Muki

Second Round
(Mongolia) Khashbaataryn Tsagaanbaatar	102
(Finland) Eetu Laamanen	001
(France) Ugo Legrand	100
(Seychelles) Nady Jeanne	000
(Uzbekistan) Mirali Sharipov	100
(Ecuador) Alexander Medina	000
(Kuwait) Eisa Al-Ali	000
(Niger) Ahmed Goumar	100
(United States) Nicholas Delpopolo	100
(Turkey) Hasan Vanlıoğlu	000
(Georgia (country)) Nugzari Tatalashvili	100
(Hungary) Attila Ungvari	000
(South Africa) Gideon van Zyl	000
(Israel) Sagi Muki	100
(China) Fang Hongyuan	000
(Kazakhstan) Dastan Ykybayev	110

Quarterfinals
(Mongolia) Khashbaataryn Tsagaanbaatar	000
(France) Ugo Legrand	000
(Uzbekistan) Mirali Sharipov	101
(Niger) Ahmed Goumar	000
(United States) Nicholas Delpopolo	000
(Georgia (country)) Nugzari Tatalashvili	010
(Israel) Sagi Muki	000
(Kazakhstan) Dastan Ykybayev	100

Semifinals
(France) Ugo Legrand	100
(Uzbekistan) Mirali Sharipov	000
(Georgia (country)) Nugzari Tatalashvili	000
(Kazakhstan) Dastan Ykybayev	100

Final
(France) Ugo Legrand	010
(Kazakhstan) Dastan Ykybayev	000

=== Pool C ===
First round fights

	Score	
Caoimhin Thompson (Republic of Ireland)	000–100	(Serbia) Ljubiša Kovačević
Bruno Mendonça (Brazil)	100–000	(Chile) Felipe Caceres
Václav Sedmidubský (Czech Republic)	002–001	(New Zealand) Lee Calder

Second Round
(Belgium) Dirk Van Tichelt	001
(Germany) Igor Wandtke	000
(Ecuador) Fernando Ibáñez	100
(Serbia) Ljubiša Kovačević	000
(Brazil) Bruno Mendonça	100
(Gabon) Terence Kouamba	000
(Yemen) Zeyad Mater	001
(Belarus) Aliaksei Ramanchyk	110
(Georgia (country)) Zebeda Rekhviashvili	100
(Dominican Republic) Fausto Bivieca	000
(Russia) Murat Kodzokov	100
(Italy) Andrea Regis	000
(Samoa) Aleni Smith	000
(Slovenia) Rok Drakšič	100
(Czech Republic) Václav Sedmidubský	000
(Iran) Elyas Ali Akbari	000

Quarterfinals
(Belgium) Dirk Van Tichelt	100
(Ecuador) Fernando Ibáñez	000
(Brazil) Bruno Mendonça	000
(Belarus) Aliaksei Ramanchyk	011
(Georgia (country)) Zebeda Rekhviashvili	001
(Russia) Murat Kodzokov	000
(Slovenia) Rok Drakšič	110
(Czech Republic) Václav Sedmidubský	000

Semifinals
(Belgium) Dirk Van Tichelt	100
(Belarus) Aliaksei Ramanchyk	000
(Georgia (country)) Zebeda Rekhviashvili	000
(Slovenia) Rok Drakšič	102

Final
(Belgium) Dirk Van Tichelt	100
(Slovenia) Rok Drakšič	000

=== Pool D ===
First round fights

	Score	
Magdiel Estrada (Cuba)	100–000	(Canada) Alexis Morin-Martel
Josue Deprez (Haiti)	100–000	(Angola) Caetano Sandango
Kiyoshi Uematsu (Spain)	000–000	(France) Pierre Duprat
Hu Xiangfei (China)	000–100	(Azerbaijan) Rustam Orujov

Second Round
(Netherlands) Dex Elmont	100
(United Kingdom) Jan Gosiewski	000
(Cuba) Magdiel Estrada	000
(Colombia) Luis Galindo	000
(Haiti) Josue Deprez	100
(Uruguay) Helios Derze	000
(Argentina) Alejandro Clara	000
(Ukraine) Serhiy Drebot	100
(South Korea) Wang Ki-Chun	000
(Japan) Shohei Ono	100
(Spain) Kiyoshi Uematsu	000
(Cyprus) Neoklis Skouroumounis	100
(Palestine) Wesam Abu Rmilah	000
(Uzbekistan) Navruz Jurakobilov	101
(Hungary) Miklós Ungvári	100
(Azerbaijan) Rustam Orujov	000

Quarterfinals
(Netherlands) Dex Elmont	000
(Cuba) Magdiel Estrada	000
(Haiti) Josue Deprez	000
(Ukraine) Serhiy Drebot	100
(Japan) Shohei Ono	101
(Cyprus) Neoklis Skouroumounis	000
(Uzbekistan) Navruz Jurakobilov	000
(Hungary) Miklós Ungvári	002

Semifinals
(Netherlands) Dex Elmont	111
(Ukraine) Serhiy Drebot	000
(Japan) Shohei Ono	100
(Hungary) Miklós Ungvári	000

Final
(Netherlands) Dex Elmont	001
(Japan) Shohei Ono	101

=== Finals ===
Semi-finals
(Mongolia) Sainjargalyn Nyam-Ochir	000
(France) Ugo Legrand	010
(Belgium) Dirk Van Tichelt	000
(Japan) Shohei Ono	100

Final
(France) Ugo Legrand	000
(Japan) Shohei Ono	101

=== Repechage ===
Repechage		Third place
(Japan) Riki Nakaya	000
(Kazakhstan) Dastan Ykybayev	100	(Kazakhstan) Dastan Ykybayev	000
		(Belgium) Dirk Van Tichelt	010

Repechage		Third place
(Slovenia) Rok Drakšič	000
(Netherlands) Dex Elmont	100	(Netherlands) Dex Elmont	011
		(Mongolia) Sainjargalyn Nyam-Ochir	000
