= Judo at the 2014 Commonwealth Games – Men's 73 kg =

Judo competition

Judo Judo – Men's 73 kg at the 2014 Commonwealth Games
- Venue: Scottish Exhibition and Conference Centre
- Date: 25 July 2014
- Competitors: 23 from 19 nations

Medalists
gold medal	Daniel Williams	England
silver medal	Adrian Leat	New Zealand
bronze medal	Jake Bensted	Australia
bronze medal	Jacques van Zyl	South Africa

The men's 73 kg Judo competitions at the 2014 Commonwealth Games in Glasgow, Scotland was held on 25 July at the Scottish Exhibition and Conference Centre. Judo returned to the program, after last being competed back in 2002.

== Results ==
=== Finals ===
Semifinals		Gold medal
J van Zyl (RSA)	0001
A Leat (NZL)	1100	A Leat (NZL)	0002
J Bensted (AUS)	0001	D Williams (ENG)	0102
D Williams (ENG)	0000

=== Repechages ===
Repechage		Bronze medal
Patrick Dawson (SCO)	0101
Emmanuel Nartey (GHA)	0102	Patrick Dawson (SCO)	0000
		Jake Bensted (AUS)	1000

Repechage		Bronze medal
James Ganzo (KEN)	0002
Eoin Fleming (NIR)	1000	Eoin Fleming (NIR)	0002
		Jacques van Zyl (RSA)	1010

=== Top half ===
Round of 32
I Kinyanjui (KEN)	010
K Vui (PNG)	010
J Gosiewski (ENG)	100
C Thompson (NIR)	000
P Dawson (SCO)	101
J Hell Bapou (CMR)	000
B Singh (IND)	001
E Madeira (MOZ)	101
C Dodge (WAL)	000
A Leat (NZL)	100

Round of 16
J van Zyl (RSA)	1010
K Vui (PNG)	0001
J Gosiewski (ENG)	0003
P Dawson (SCO)	0002
E Nartey (GHA)	0002
E Madeira (MOZ)	0003
M Mbarouk (TAN)	0002
A Leat (NZL)	1000

Quarterfinals
J van Zyl (RSA)	1001
P Dawson (SCO)	0001
E Nartey (GHA)	0003
A Leat (NZL)	1000

Semifinals
J van Zyl (RSA)	0001
A Leat (NZL)	1100

=== Bottom half ===
Round of 32
C Repiyallage (SRI)	110
M Rouvoune (VAN)	000
K Maxwell (BAR)	000
A Nelson (PNG)	100
C Ireland (WAL)	000
D Williams (ENG)	002
N Jeanne (SEY)	0002
G Chilipweli (TAN)	0004

Round of 16
J Bensted (AUS)	100
C Repiyallage (SRI)	000
J Ganzo (KEN)	0023
A Nelson (PNG)	0002
A Dickens (AUS)	0012
D Williams (ENG)	0100
E Fleming (NIR)	0101
N Jeanne (SEY)	0003

Quarterfinals
J Bensted (AUS)	1000
J Ganzo (KEN)	0001
D Williams (ENG)	1001
E Fleming (NIR)	0002

Semifinals
J Bensted (AUS)	0001
D Williams (ENG)	0000
