= Judo at the 2010 South American Games – Men's 73kg =

Judo competition

The Men's 73 kg event at the 2010 South American Games was held on March 20.

== Medalists ==
Gold	Silver	Bronze
Alejandro Clara; Argentina	Pablo Azzi Almeida; Uruguay	Antonio Rivas; Venezuela; Bruno Mendonça; Brazil

== Results ==
=== Main Bracket ===
First round
Sergio Casamada (PAR)	000
Bruno Mendonça (BRA)	100
Antonio Rivas (VEN)	000^{2}
Alejandro Clara (ARG)	001^{1}

Quarterfinals
Bruno Mendonça (BRA)	000^{2}
Fernando Andres Romero (ECU)	111^{1}
Pablo Azzi Almeida (URU)	101^{1}
Fernando Salazar Moreno (CHI)	000^{2}
Alejandro Clara (ARG)	010^{1}
Michaelangelo Bell (AHO)	000^{3}
Paulo Cezar Perez (PER)	000
Derian Giraldo (COL)	100^{1}

Semifinals
Fernando Andres Romero (ECU)	000^{2}
Pablo Azzi Almeida (URU)	001
Alejandro Clara (ARG)	GS
Derian Giraldo (COL)	001^{3}

Final
Pablo Azzi Almeida (URU)	000H
Alejandro Clara (ARG)	100^{1}

=== Repechage ===
First round
bye
Bruno Mendonça (BRA)
bye
Fernando Salazar Moreno (CHI)
Antonio Rivas (VEN)	020^{1}
Michaelangelo Bell (AHO)	000^{3}
Paulo Cezar Perez (PER)
Bye

Second round
Bruno Mendonça (BRA)	111^{1}
Fernando Salazar Moreno (CHI)	010^{3}
Antonio Rivas (VEN)	100
Paulo Cezar Perez (PER)	000

Bronze medal finals
Bruno Mendonça (BRA)	012^{1}
Derian Giraldo (COL)	000
Antonio Rivas (VEN)	110^{1}
Fernando Andres Romero (ECU)	000
