= Judo at the 2011 Pan American Games – Men's 73 kg =

Men's 73 kg at the 2011 Pan American Games
- Venue: CODE II Gymnasium
- Dates: October 28
- Competitors: 10 from 10 nations

Medalists
Gold medal	Bruno Mendonça	Brazil
Silver medal	Alejandro Carta	Argentina
Bronze medal	Ronald Girones	Cuba
Bronze medal	Nicholas Tritton	Canada

The men's 73 kg competition of the judo events at the 2011 Pan American Games in Guadalajara, Mexico, was held on October 28 at the CODE II Gymanasium. The defending champion was Ryan Reser of the United States.

== Schedule ==
All times are Central Standard Time (UTC-6).

Date	Time	Round
October 28, 2011	11:16	Preliminaries
October 28, 2011	12:04	Quarterfinals
October 28, 2011	13:56	Semifinals
October 28, 2011	14:28	Repechage
October 28, 2011	17:48	Bronze medal matches
October 28, 2011	18:04	Final

== Results ==
Legend

- 1st number = Ippon
- 2nd number = Waza-ari
- 3rd number = Yuko

=== Bracket ===
Preliminaries
Derian Castro (COL)	000
Michael Eldred (USA)	110
Lee Mata (MEX)	100
Antonio Rivas (VEN)	000

Quarter Finals
Bruno Mendonça (BRA)	001
Fernando Salazar (CHI)	000
Nicholas Tritton (CAN)	100
Michael Eldred (USA)	000
Ronald Girones (CUB)	100
Sergio Sar Pellejero (URU)	000
Alejandro Carta (ARG)	003
Lee Mata (MEX)	001

Semi Finals
Bruno Mendonça (BRA)	101
Nicholas Tritton (CAN)	001
Ronald Girones (CUB)	001
Alejandro Carta (ARG)	010

Final
Bruno Mendonça (BRA)	100
Alejandro Carta (ARG)	000

=== Repechage round ===
Two bronze medals were awarded.

Semifinals
Fernando Salazar (CHI)	000
Michael Eldred (USA)	001
Sergio Sar Pellejero (URU)	000
Lee Mata (MEX)	114

Finals
Michael Eldred (USA)	000
Ronald Girones (CUB)	001
Nicholas Tritton (CAN)	100
Lee Mata (MEX)	000
