= Judo at the 2012 Summer Olympics – Men's 73 kg =

Judo competition

Men's 73kg at the Games of the XXX Olympiad
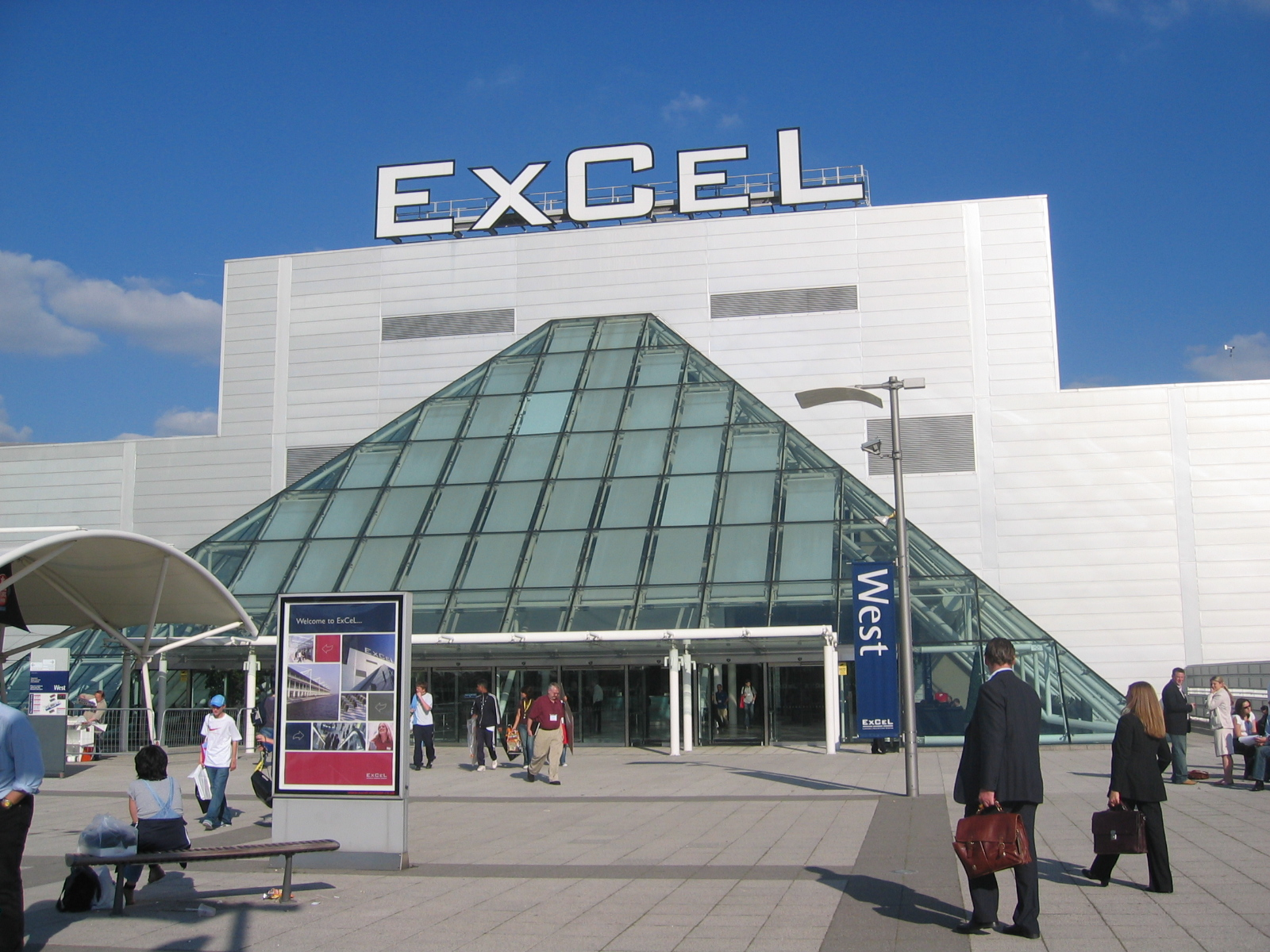
- ExCel Exhibition Centre
- Venue: ExCeL Exhibition Centre
- Date: 30 July 2012
- Competitors: 34 from 34 nations

Medalists
1st place, gold medalist(s)		Mansur Isaev	Russia
2nd place, silver medalist(s)		Riki Nakaya	Japan
3rd place, bronze medalist(s)		Nyam-Ochir Sainjargal	Mongolia
3rd place, bronze medalist(s)		Ugo Legrand	France

The Men's 73 kg competition in judo at the 2012 Summer Olympics in London, United Kingdom, took place at ExCeL London.

The gold and silver medals were determined by a single-elimination tournament, with the winner of the final taking gold and the loser receiving silver. Judo events awarded two bronze medals. Quarterfinal losers competed in a repechage match for the right to face a semifinal loser for a bronze medal (that is, the judokas defeated in quarterfinals A and B competed against each other, with the winner of that match facing the semifinal loser from the other half of the bracket).

== Schedule ==
All times are British Summer Time (UTC+1)

Date	Time	Round
Monday, 30 July 2012	09:30; 14:00; 16:10	Qualifications; Semifinals; Final

== Results ==
=== Finals ===
Semi-finals
Wang Ki-Chun (KOR)	0002
Mansur Isaev (RUS)	0011
Riki Nakaya (JPN)	0000
Dex Elmont (NED)	0001

Final
Mansur Isaev (RUS)	0011
Riki Nakaya (JPN)	0001

=== Repechages ===
Repechage		Bronze medal
Nicholas Delpopolo (USA)	0002
Nyam-Ochir Sainjargal (MGL)	0011	Nyam-Ochir Sainjargal (MGL)	0011
		Dex Elmont (NED)	0002

Repechage		Bronze medal
Rasul Boqiev (TJK)	0002
Ugo Legrand (FRA)	0010	Ugo Legrand (FRA)	0101
		Wang Ki-Chun (KOR)	0001

=== Pool A ===
First Round
K-C Wang (KOR)	0001
N Tatalashvili (GEO)	0000

Second Round
K-C Wang (KOR)	1001
R Ibragimov (KAZ)	0000
J Ježek (CZE)	0100
A Smith (SAM)	0000
D Van Tichelt (BEL)	0100
M Abu Remeleh (PLE)	0000
CY Cheung (HKG)	0000
N Delpopolo* (USA)	0020

Third Round
K-C Wang (KOR)	0010
J Ježek (CZE)	0001
D Van Tichelt (BEL)	0000
N Delpopolo (USA)	0010

Quarterfinals
K-C Wang (KOR)	0000
N Delpopolo (USA)	0000

=== Pool B ===
First Round

Second Round
M Isaev (RUS)	0011
K Uematsu (ESP)	0002
R Orujov (AZE)	0100
G van Zyl (RSA)	0101
N-O Sainjargal (MGL)	0011
C Völk (GER)	0001
J Pina (POR)	0011
V Soroka (UKR)	0102

Third Round
M Isaev (RUS)	1001
R Orujov (AZE)	000
N-O Sainjargal (MGL)	0011
V Soroka (UKR)	0002

Quarterfinals
M Isaev (RUS)	0100
N-O Sainjargal (MGL)	0001

=== Pool C ===
First Round
N Jurakobilov (UZB)	0100
S Dowabobo (NRU)	0001

Second Round
R Nakaya (JPN)	0100
K Maxwell (BAR)	0001
J Palelashvili (ISR)	0101
S Huysuz (TUR)	0000
N Jurakobilov (UZB)	0011
N Tritton (CAN)	0002
D Williams (GBR)	0000
R Boqiev (TJK)	1001

Third Round
R Nakaya (JPN)	0100
J Palelashvili (ISR)	0000
N Jurakobilov (UZB)	0001
R Boqiev (TJK)	1001

Quarterfinals
R Nakaya (JPN)	0011
R Boqiev (TJK)	0002

=== Pool D ===
First Round

Second Round
D Elmont (NED)	0111
E Nartey (GHA)	0003
FY Uwase (RWA)	0000
B Mendonca (BRA)	0100
U Legrand (FRA)	0010
T Adamiec (POL)	0000
O Murillo Segura (CRC)	0003
H Hafiz (EGY)	0020

Third Round
D Elmont (NED)	0011
B Mendonca (BRA)	0002
U Legrand (FRA)	0100
H Hafiz (EGY)	0104

Quarterfinals
D Elmont (NED)	0100
U Legrand (FRA)	0000

== Controversy ==
American Nicholas Delpopolo was ejected from the Games and disqualified by the International Olympic Committee from his seventh position finish after he tested positive for marijuana. Though he claimed he had accidentally taken the banned substance before the Games begun, he apologized for the "embarrassment."
