= Ugo Legrand =

French judo practitioner (born 1989)

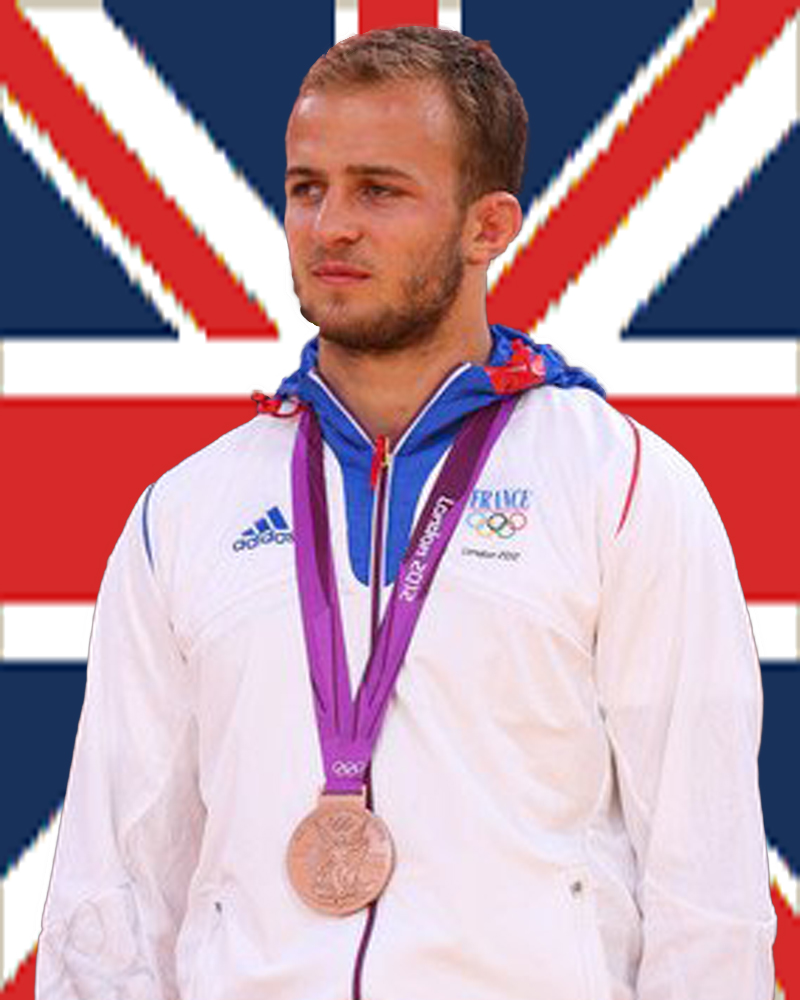

Personal information
- Born: 22 January 1989 (age 37) Mont-Saint-Aignan, France
- Occupation: Judoka
- Website: en.ugojudo.com

Sport
- Country: France
- Sport: Judo
- Weight class: –73 kg

Achievements and titles
- Olympic Games: (bronze) (2012)
- World Champ.: (silver) (2013)
- European Champ.: (gold) (2012)
Medal record
Men's judo
Representing France
Olympic Games
Bronze medal – third place	2012 London	‍–‍73 kg
World Championships
Silver medal – second place	2013 Rio de Janeiro	‍–‍73 kg
Bronze medal – third place	2011 Paris	‍–‍73 kg
European Championships
Gold medal – first place	2012 Chelyabinsk	‍–‍73 kg
Silver medal – second place	2014 Montpellier	‍–‍73 kg
Bronze medal – third place	2010 Vienna	‍–‍73 kg
IJF Grand Slam
Bronze medal – third place	2011 Paris	‍–‍73 kg
Bronze medal – third place	2014 Paris	‍–‍73 kg
IJF Grand Prix
Gold medal – first place	2010 Qingdao	‍–‍73 kg
Bronze medal – third place	2011 Amsterdam	‍–‍73 kg
Bronze medal – third place	2012 Düsseldorf	‍–‍73 kg
Bronze medal – third place	2013 Samsun	‍–‍73 kg
Bronze medal – third place	2013 Miami	‍–‍73 kg
European U23 Championships
Gold medal – first place	2009 Antalya	‍–‍73 kg
World Juniors Championships
Gold medal – first place	2008 Bangkok	‍–‍66 kg
European Junior Championships
Gold medal – first place	2008 Warsaw	‍–‍66 kg
Silver medal – second place	2007 Prague	‍–‍66 kg
Bronze medal – third place	2006 Tallinn	‍–‍66 kg
European Cadet Championships
Bronze medal – third place	2005 Salzburg	‍–‍66 kg

Profile at external databases
- IJF: 2308
- JudoInside.com: 38378
- Updated on 25 May 2023

Ugo Legrand (born 22 January 1989, Mont-Saint-Aignan) is a judoka from France. In 2012, he won bronze at the 2012 Summer Olympics in the -73 kg class. He won his first match against Tomasz Adamiec, and his second against Hussein Hafiz. After losing his quarterfinal again Dex Elmont, he was entered into the repechage. He won his first repechage match against Rasul Boqiev before winning his bronze medal match against Wang Ki-Chun.
