= 2011 Pan American Judo Championships =

Judo competition

2011 Judo Pan American Judo Championships
- Venue: CODE II Gymnasium
- Location: Guadalajara, Mexico
- Dates: 1–3 April 2011
- Competitors: 188 from 21 nations

Competition at external databases
- Links: IJF • JudoInside

The 2011 Pan American Judo Championships was held in Guadalajara, Mexico at the CODE II Gymnasium from April 1–2, 2011. The event is being held as a test event for the 2011 Pan American Games. Also this event is one of the qualification event for the judo events at the 2011 Pan American Games.

== Medal table ==
* Host nation (Mexico)

Rank	Nation	Gold	Silver	Bronze	Total
1	Cuba (CUB)	8	3	4	15
2	Brazil (BRA)	6	5	5	16
3	United States (USA)	1	3	5	9
4	Argentina (ARG)	1	0	4	5
5	Ecuador (ECU)	1	0	0	1
5	El Salvador (SLV)	1	0	0	1
7	Mexico (MEX)*	0	3	2	5
8	Canada (CAN)	0	2	7	9
9	Venezuela (VEN)	0	1	2	3
10	Haiti (HAI)	0	1	0	1
11	Colombia (COL)	0	0	5	5
12	Puerto Rico (PUR)	0	0	1	1
Totals (12 entries)		18	18	35	71

=== Men's events ===
Event	Gold	Silver	Bronze
Super extra-lightweight (55 kg)	Fredy López; El Salvador (SLV)	Youssef Youssef; Canada (CAN)	Hernan Birbrier; Argentina (ARG)
Super extra-lightweight (55 kg)	Fredy López; El Salvador (SLV)	Youssef Youssef; Canada (CAN)	Jordi Villegas; Mexico (MEX)
Extra-lightweight (60 kg)	Felipe Kitadai; Brazil (BRA)	Nabor Castillo; Mexico (MEX)	Frazer Will; Canada (CAN)
Extra-lightweight (60 kg)	Felipe Kitadai; Brazil (BRA)	Nabor Castillo; Mexico (MEX)	Antonio Bentancourt; Cuba (CUB)
Half-lightweight (66 kg)	Leandro Cunha; Brazil (BRA)	Ricardo Valderrama; Venezuela (VEN)	Angelo Gómez; Cuba (CUB)
Half-lightweight (66 kg)	Leandro Cunha; Brazil (BRA)	Ricardo Valderrama; Venezuela (VEN)	Michal Popiel; Canada (CAN)
Lightweight (73 kg)	Bruno Mendonça; Brazil (BRA)	Ronald Girones; Cuba (CUB)	Nick Delpopolo; United States (USA)
Lightweight (73 kg)	Bruno Mendonça; Brazil (BRA)	Ronald Girones; Cuba (CUB)	Nicholas Tritton; Canada (CAN)
Half-middleweight (81 kg)	Leandro Guilheiro; Brazil (BRA)	Travis Stevens; United States (USA)	Emmanuel Lucenti; Argentina (ARG)
Half-middleweight (81 kg)	Leandro Guilheiro; Brazil (BRA)	Travis Stevens; United States (USA)	Antoine Valois-Fortier; Canada (CAN)
Middleweight (90 kg)	Asley González; Cuba (CUB)	Alexandre Emond; Canada (CAN)	Rodrigo Luna; Brazil (BRA)
Middleweight (90 kg)	Asley González; Cuba (CUB)	Alexandre Emond; Canada (CAN)	José Camacho; Venezuela (VEN)
Half-heavyweight (100 kg)	Oreidis Despaigne; Cuba (CUB)	Leonardo Leite; Brazil (BRA)	Cristian Schmidt; Argentina (ARG)
Half-heavyweight (100 kg)	Oreidis Despaigne; Cuba (CUB)	Leonardo Leite; Brazil (BRA)	Kyle Vashkulat; United States (USA)
Heavyweight (+100 kg)	Oscar Braison; Cuba (CUB)	Rafael Silva; Brazil (BRA)	Orlando Baccino; Argentina (ARG)
Heavyweight (+100 kg)	Oscar Braison; Cuba (CUB)	Rafael Silva; Brazil (BRA)	Luis Ignacio Salazar; Colombia (COL)
Men's Team	Brazil (BRA)	United States (USA)	Cuba (CUB)
Men's Team	Brazil (BRA)	United States (USA)	Colombia (COL)

=== Women's events ===
Event	Gold	Silver	Bronze
Super extra-lightweight* (44 kg)	Diana Cobos; Ecuador (ECU)	Silvia González; Mexico (MEX)	Alexa Liddie; United States (USA)
Extra-lightweight (48 kg)	Paula Pareto; Argentina (ARG)	Dayaris Mestre Alvarez; Cuba (CUB)	Taciana Lima; Brazil (BRA)
Extra-lightweight (48 kg)	Paula Pareto; Argentina (ARG)	Dayaris Mestre Alvarez; Cuba (CUB)	Edna Carrillo; Mexico (MEX)
Half-lightweight (52 kg)	Yanet Bermoy; Cuba (CUB)	Linouse Desravine; Haiti (HAI)	Angelica Delgado; United States (USA)
Half-lightweight (52 kg)	Yanet Bermoy; Cuba (CUB)	Linouse Desravine; Haiti (HAI)	Érika Miranda; Brazil (BRA)
Lightweight (57 kg)	Yurisleidy Lupetey; Cuba (CUB)	Marti Malloy; United States (USA)	Joliane Melançon; Canada (CAN)
Lightweight (57 kg)	Yurisleidy Lupetey; Cuba (CUB)	Marti Malloy; United States (USA)	Rafaela Silva; Brazil (BRA)
Half-middleweight (63 kg)	Yaritza Abel; Cuba (CUB)	Mariana Silva; Brazil (BRA)	Christal Ransom; United States (USA)
Half-middleweight (63 kg)	Yaritza Abel; Cuba (CUB)	Mariana Silva; Brazil (BRA)	Myriam Lamarche; Canada (CAN)
Middleweight (70 kg)	Onix Cortés; Cuba (CUB)	Maria Portela; Brazil (BRA)	Kelita Zupancic; Canada (CAN)
Middleweight (70 kg)	Onix Cortés; Cuba (CUB)	Maria Portela; Brazil (BRA)	Yuri Alvear; Colombia (COL)
Half-heavyweight (78 kg)	Kayla Harrison; United States (USA)	Mayra Aguiar; Brazil (BRA)	Anny Cortez; Colombia (COL)
Half-heavyweight (78 kg)	Kayla Harrison; United States (USA)	Mayra Aguiar; Brazil (BRA)	Yalennis Castillo; Cuba (CUB)
Heavyweight (+78 kg)	Idalys Ortiz; Cuba (CUB)	Vanessa Zambotti; Mexico (MEX)	Melissa Mojica; Puerto Rico (PUR)
Heavyweight (+78 kg)	Idalys Ortiz; Cuba (CUB)	Vanessa Zambotti; Mexico (MEX)	Maria Suelen Altheman; Brazil (BRA)
Women's Team	Brazil (BRA)	Cuba (CUB)	Venezuela (VEN)
Women's Team	Brazil (BRA)	Cuba (CUB)	Colombia (COL)

*Only 4 athletes competed, so only one bronze medal was awarded.

== Participating nations ==
189 athletes representing 20 countries competed.

- Argentina (14)
- Brazil (14)
- Canada (14)
- Chile (9)
- Colombia (14)
- Costa Rica (3)
- Cuba (14)
- Dominican Republic (7)
- Ecuador (8)
- El Salvador (7)
- Guatemala (7)
- Haiti (7)
- Honduras (3)
- Mexico (16)
- Netherlands Antilles (1)
- Peru (10)
- Puerto Rico (9)
- United States (16)
- Uruguay (2)
- Venezuela (14)

== See also ==
- Judo at the 2011 Pan American Games
