= Yasuhiro Awano =

Japanese judoka (born 1988)

Personal information
- Born: 27 September 1988 (age 38) Shimotsuma, Ibaraki, Japan
- Occupation: Judoka

Sport
- Country: Japan
- Sport: Judo
- Weight class: ‍–‍73 kg

Achievements and titles
- World Champ.: (bronze) (2010)
- Asian Champ.: 7th (2013)
Medal record
Men's judo
Representing Japan
World Championships
Silver medal – second place	2012 Salvador	Men's team
Bronze medal – third place	2010 Tokyo	‍–‍73 kg
World Masters
Bronze medal – third place	2010 Suwon	‍–‍73 kg
Bronze medal – third place	2011 Baku	‍–‍73 kg
IJF Grand Slam
Silver medal – second place	2008 Tokyo	‍–‍73 kg
Silver medal – second place	2009 Tokyo	‍–‍73 kg
Bronze medal – third place	2010 Paris	‍–‍73 kg
Bronze medal – third place	2010 Moscow	‍–‍73 kg
Bronze medal – third place	2011 Paris	‍–‍73 kg
IJF Grand Prix
Silver medal – second place	2011 Abu Dhabi	‍–‍73 kg
Summer Universiade
Gold medal – first place	2011 Shenzhen	Men's team
Bronze medal – third place	2009 Belgrade	Men's team

Profile at external databases
- IJF: 2004
- JudoInside.com: 48434
- Updated on 25 July 2023

Yasuhiro Awano (粟野 靖浩, Awano Yasuhiro; born 27 September 1988 in Shimotsuma, Ibaraki) is a Japanese judoka. He won a bronze medal in the lightweight division (73 kg) at the 2010 World Judo Championships.
