= Fredy López =

Salvadoran judoka (born 1992)

Personal information
- Born: 24 May 1992 (age 34)
- Occupation: Judoka

Sport
- Sport: Judo
Medal record
Representing El Salvador
Men's judo
Pan American Judo Championships
Gold medal – first place	2010 San Salvador	–55 kg
Gold medal – first place	2011 Guadalajara	–55 kg

Profile at external databases
- JudoInside.com: 66257

Alfredo "Fredy" López-Salegio (born 24 May 1992) is a judoka from El Salvador.
