= Rinat Ibragimov (judoka) =

Kazakhstani judoka (born 1986)

Personal information
- Born: 7 May 1986 (age 40)
- Occupation: Judoka

Sport
- Country: Kazakhstan
- Sport: Judo
- Weight class: ‍–‍73 kg, ‍–‍81 kg, ‍–‍90 kg

Achievements and titles
- Olympic Games: R32 (2008, 2012)
- World Champ.: 5th (2009, 2011)
- Asian Champ.: (silver) (2008)
Medal record
Men's judo
Representing Kazakhstan
Asian Championships
Silver medal – second place	2008 Jeju	‍–‍73 kg
IJF Grand Slam
Bronze medal – third place	2010 Paris	‍–‍73 kg
IJF Grand Prix
Bronze medal – third place	2011 Abu Dhabi	‍–‍73 kg
Bronze medal – third place	2013 Ulaanbaatar	‍–‍90 kg

Profile at external databases
- IJF: 452
- JudoInside.com: 22955
- Updated on 28 November 2022

Rinat Ibragimov (born 7 May 1986 in Guryev, Kazakh SSR) is a Kazakhstani judoka (practitioner of the Japanese martial art of judo). He competed in the men's 73 kg event at the 2008 and 2012 Summer Olympics. At the 2008 Olympics, he lost his first match to Wang Ki-chun. Because Wang went on to the final, Ibragimov competed in the repechage, where he lost to Shokir Muminov.

At the 2012 Summer Olympics Ibragimov was again eliminated by Wang Ki-chun in the second round.
