= Zaza Kedelashvili =

Georgian judoka (born 1983)

Personal information
- Born: 12 November 1985 (age 40)
- Occupation: Judoka

Sport
- Country: Georgia
- Sport: Judo
- Weight class: ‍–‍66 kg, ‍–‍73 kg

Achievements and titles
- Olympic Games: R32 (2008)
- World Champ.: R16 (2009, 2010)
- European Champ.: (gold) (2006, 2007, 2008)
Medal record
Men's judo
Representing Georgia
World Championships
Gold medal – first place	2006 Paris	Men's team
Gold medal – first place	2008 Tokyo	Men's team
European Championships
Gold medal – first place	2006 Tampere	‍–‍66 kg
Gold medal – first place	2007 Belgrade	‍–‍66 kg
Gold medal – first place	2007 Minsk	Men's team
Gold medal – first place	2008 Lisbon	‍–‍66 kg
Gold medal – first place	2010 Vienna	Men's team
European U23 Championships
Bronze medal – third place	2005 Kyiv	‍–‍66 kg
World Juniors Championships
Silver medal – second place	2004 Budapest	‍–‍66 kg
European Junior Championships
Silver medal – second place	2002 Rotterdam	‍–‍66 kg

Profile at external databases
- IJF: 768
- JudoInside.com: 14448
- Updated on 16 November 2022

Zaza Kedelashvili (Georgian: ზაზა კედელაშვილი; born 12 November 1985) is a Georgian former judoka.

== Achievements ==
Year	Tournament	Place	Weight class
2008	European Judo Championships	1st	Half lightweight (66 kg)
2007	European Judo Championships	1st	Half lightweight (66 kg)
2006	European Judo Championships	1st	Half lightweight (66 kg)
