= Sašo Jereb =

Slovenian Olympic judoka

Personal information
- Born: 20 January 1983 (age 43) Žiri, SR Slovenia, SFR; Yugoslavia
- Occupation: Judoka
- Height: 1.78 m (5 ft 10 in)

Sport
- Country: Slovenia
- Sport: Judo
- Weight class: –73 kg
- Club: Judo Klub Olimpija

Achievements and titles
- Olympic Games: R32 (2004)
- World Champ.: R32 (2005, 2007, 2009, 2011)
- European Champ.: 7th (2004, 2005)
Medal record
Men's judo
Representing Slovenia
European U23 Championships
Silver medal – second place	2004 Ljubljana	–73 kg
Silver medal – second place	2005 Kyiv	–73 kg
World Juniors Championships
Silver medal – second place	2002 Jeju	–73 kg
European Junior Championships
Silver medal – second place	2001 Budapest	–73 kg

Profile at external databases
- IJF: 190
- JudoInside.com: 10223
- Updated on 11 February 2022

Sašo Jereb (born 20 January 1983 in Žiri) is a Slovenian judoka, who competed in the men's lightweight category. He represented Slovenia at the 2004 Summer Olympics, and has also held five Slovenian championship titles to his career hardware in the 73-kg division. Throughout his sporting career, Jereb trained full-time for the Olympic Judo Club (Slovene: Judo Klub Olimpija) in Ljubljana.

Jereb qualified for the Slovenian squad, as the only male judoka, in the men's lightweight class (73 kg) at the 2004 Summer Olympics in Athens, by placing seventh and receiving a berth from the European Championships in Bucharest, Romania. He lost his opening match to Iranian judoka Hamed Malekmohammadi, who successfully scored an ippon and an uchi mata gaeshi (inner thigh counter), at three minutes and twenty-eight seconds.
