= Nicholas Delpopolo =

American judoka (born 1989)

Personal information
- Nickname: Nick
- Born: Petar Perović; February 8, 1989 (age 37) Nikšić, SR Montenegro, SFR Yugoslavia
- Home town: Scotia, New York, U.S.
- Occupation: Judoka
- Height: 5 ft 8 in (173 cm)
- Website: www.nickdelpopolo.us

Sport
- Country: United States
- Sport: Judo
- Weight class: ‍–‍73 kg
- Rank: 2nd dan black belt
- Club: USA Judo National Training Site at OTC
- Coached by: Carrie Chandler; Ed Liddie

Achievements and titles
- Olympic Games: 7th (2016)
- World Champ.: R16 (2010)
- Pan American Champ.: (gold) (2013)
Medal record
Men's judo
Representing United States
Pan American Games
Bronze medal – third place	2019 Lima	‍–‍73 kg
Pan American Championships
Gold medal – first place	2013 San José	‍–‍73 kg
Bronze medal – third place	2011 Guadalajara	‍–‍73 kg
Bronze medal – third place	2012 Montreal	‍–‍73 kg
Bronze medal – third place	2014 Guayaquil	‍–‍73 kg
Bronze medal – third place	2015 Edmonton	‍–‍73 kg
Bronze medal – third place	2018 San José	‍–‍73 kg
IJF Grand Prix
Silver medal – second place	2016 Qingdao	‍–‍81 kg
Bronze medal – third place	2010 Abu Dhabi	‍–‍73 kg
Bronze medal – third place	2015 Budapest	‍–‍73 kg

Profile at external databases
- IJF: 2085
- JudoInside.com: 41597
- Updated on 8 December 2022

Nicholas Delpopolo (born February 8, 1989) is an American judoka. He competed in the men's 73 kg event at the 2012 Summer Olympics; after defeating Cheung Chi Yip in the second round and Dirk Van Tichelt in the third, he lost to Wang Ki-Chun in the fourth round and was eliminated by Nyam-Ochir Sainjargal in the repechages.

On August 6, 2012, Delpopolo was expelled from the Olympics by the IOC after he tested positive for cannabis. Upon exiting the games, Delpopolo stated the positive test result was caused by "inadvertent consumption of food that I did not realize had been baked with marijuana, before I left for the Olympic Games."

On August 9, 2016, Delpopolo competed again at the 2016 Summer Olympics in the men's 73 kg event, defeating Ahmed Goumar (Niger) in the first round, Odbayar Ganbaatar (Mongolia) in the second round, and ultimately losing to Miklós Ungvári (Hungary) in the Quarter-finals by penalty points. Delpopolo ultimately finished 7th in his division.

== Personal life ==
Delpopolo was born as Petar Perović (Montenegrin/Serbian Cyrillic: Петар Перовић) in Nikšić, SR Montenegro, SFR Yugoslavia. Of Montenegrin heritage, his biological parents left him as a toddler. After being orphaned for 21 months he was adopted as a 2-year-old by a New Jersey family. As his adoptive father Dominic's family was from Serbia, they started adoption process there until eventually they were taken to an orphanage near Nikšić, Montenegro. Several years later they adopted another child there, a daughter named Helen.

Nick was raised by his adoptive parents in Westfield, New Jersey and attended Bergen Catholic High School.

In 2009, he went to Montenegro to see his biological father, but chose not to reveal himself because the man looked hostile. Nick also plans to find his biological mother who is in Serbia.
