= Jake Bensted =

Australian Olympic judoka

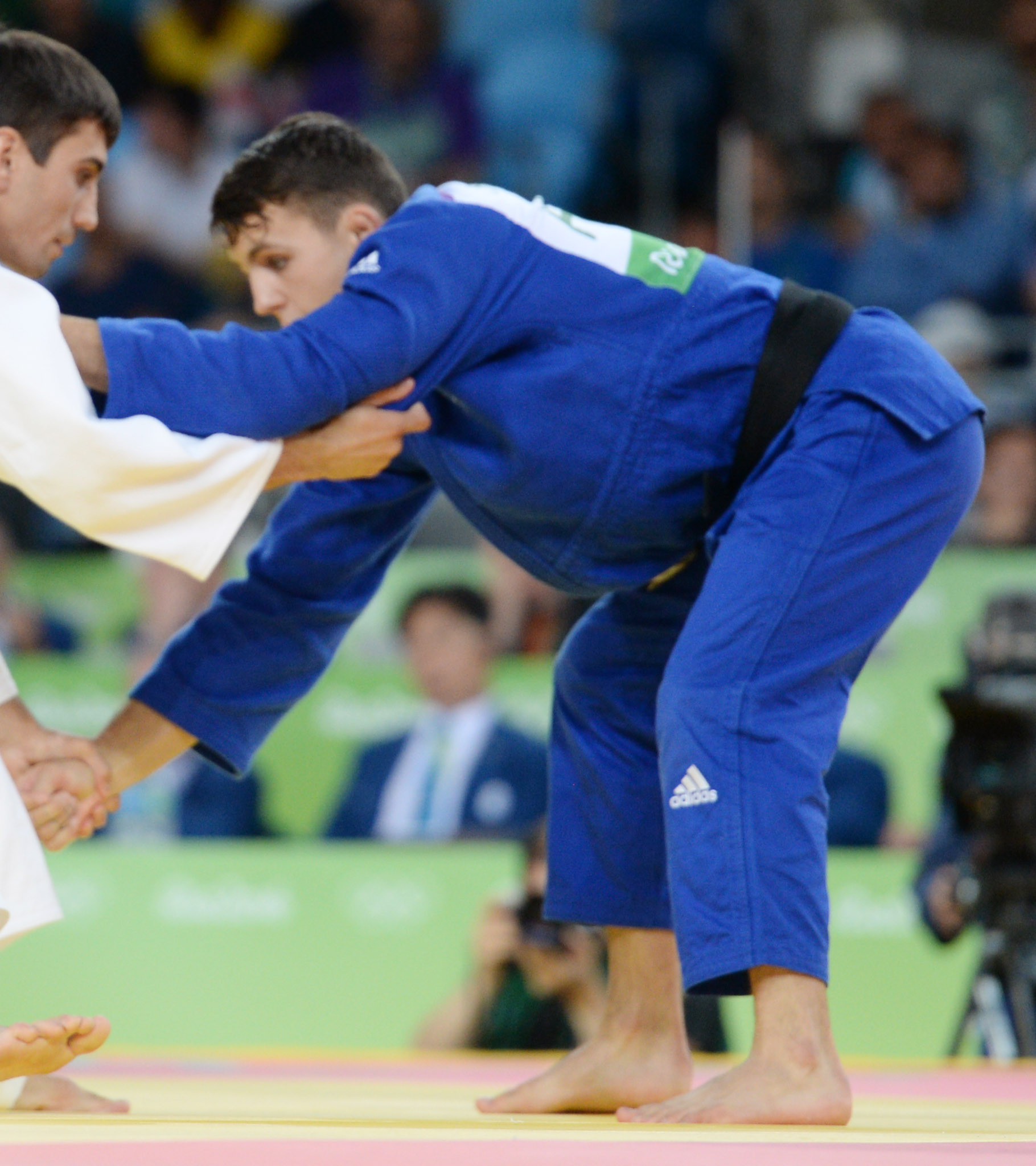
- Bensted at the 2016 Olympics

Personal information
- Born: 4 March 1994 (age 32) Geelong, Australia
- Height: 173 cm (5 ft 8 in)
- Weight: 73 kg (161 lb)

Sport
- Sport: Judo
- Club: iJudo; Geelong YMCA Judo Club
- Coached by: Daniel Kelly (national); Dennis Iverson (personal)
Medal record
Representing Australia
Commonwealth Games
Bronze medal – third place	2014 Glasgow	-73 kg
Bronze medal – third place	2022 Birmingham	–73 kg

Jake Bensted (born 4 March 1994) is an Australian judoka. He won a bronze medal at the 2014 Commonwealth Games and competed at the 2016 Summer Olympics, where he was eliminated in the second bout.
