= 2010 Judo Grand Prix Abu Dhabi =

Judo competition

Judo 2010 Judo Grand Prix Abu Dhabi
- Location: Abu Dhabi, United Arab Emirates
- Dates: 22–24 November 2010
- Competitors: 289 from 53 nations

Competition at external databases
- Links: IJF • JudoInside

The 2010 Judo Grand Prix Abu Dhabi was held in Abu Dhabi, United Arab Emirates from 22 to 24 November 2010.

== Medal summary ==
=== Men's events ===
Event	Gold	Silver	Bronze
Extra-lightweight (−60 kg)	Beslan Mudranov (RUS)	Arsen Galstyan (RUS)	Boldbaatar Chimed-Yondon (MGL)
Extra-lightweight (−60 kg)	Beslan Mudranov (RUS)	Arsen Galstyan (RUS)	Hovhannes Davtyan (ARM)
Half-lightweight (−66 kg)	Musa Mogushkov (RUS)	Alim Gadanov (RUS)	Serhiy Drebot (UKR)
Half-lightweight (−66 kg)	Musa Mogushkov (RUS)	Alim Gadanov (RUS)	Ulugbek Norkobilov (UZB)
Lightweight (−73 kg)	Mansur Isaev (RUS)	Volodymyr Soroka (UKR)	Nicholas Delpopolo (USA)
Lightweight (−73 kg)	Mansur Isaev (RUS)	Volodymyr Soroka (UKR)	Dex Elmont (NED)
Half-middleweight (−81 kg)	Sven Maresch (GER)	Aljaž Sedej (SLO)	Vitalii Dudchyk (UKR)
Half-middleweight (−81 kg)	Sven Maresch (GER)	Aljaž Sedej (SLO)	Artem Vasylenko (UKR)
Middleweight (−90 kg)	Khurshid Nabiev (UZB)	Roberto Meloni (ITA)	Lyès Bouyacoub (ALG)
Middleweight (−90 kg)	Khurshid Nabiev (UZB)	Roberto Meloni (ITA)	Chingiz Mamedov (KGZ)
Half-heavyweight (−100 kg)	Ramziddin Sayidov (UZB)	Utkir Kurbanov (UZB)	Tagir Khaybulaev (RUS)
Half-heavyweight (−100 kg)	Ramziddin Sayidov (UZB)	Utkir Kurbanov (UZB)	Lukáš Krpálek (CZE)
Heavyweight (+100 kg)	Andreas Tölzer (GER)	Islam El Shehaby (EGY)	Stanislav Bondarenko (UKR)
Heavyweight (+100 kg)	Andreas Tölzer (GER)	Islam El Shehaby (EGY)	Abdullo Tangriev (UZB)

=== Women's events ===
Event	Gold	Silver	Bronze
Extra-lightweight (−48 kg)	Alina Dumitru (ROU)	Lyudmila Bogdanova (RUS)	Aurore Urani Climence (FRA)
Extra-lightweight (−48 kg)	Alina Dumitru (ROU)	Lyudmila Bogdanova (RUS)	Laëtitia Payet (FRA)
Half-lightweight (−52 kg)	Joana Ramos (POR)	Érika Miranda (BRA)	Ana Carrascosa (ESP)
Half-lightweight (−52 kg)	Joana Ramos (POR)	Érika Miranda (BRA)	Marta Kuban (POL)
Lightweight (−57 kg)	Sabrina Filzmoser (AUT)	Giulia Quintavalle (ITA)	Ioulietta Boukouvala (GRE)
Lightweight (−57 kg)	Sabrina Filzmoser (AUT)	Giulia Quintavalle (ITA)	Corina Căprioriu (ROU)
Half-middleweight (−63 kg)	Xu Yuhua (CHN)	Clarisse Agbegnenou (FRA)	Yahaira Aguirre (ESP)
Half-middleweight (−63 kg)	Xu Yuhua (CHN)	Clarisse Agbegnenou (FRA)	Hilde Drexler (AUT)
Middleweight (−70 kg)	Raša Sraka (SLO)	Cecilia Blanco (ESP)	Edith Bosch (NED)
Middleweight (−70 kg)	Raša Sraka (SLO)	Cecilia Blanco (ESP)	Juliane Robra (SUI)
Half-heavyweight (−78 kg)	Kayla Harrison (USA)	Zhang Zhehui (CHN)	Maryna Pryshchepa (UKR)
Half-heavyweight (−78 kg)	Kayla Harrison (USA)	Zhang Zhehui (CHN)	Audrey Tcheuméo (FRA)
Heavyweight (+78 kg)	Liu Huanyuan (CHN)	Belkıs Zehra Kaya (TUR)	Franziska Konitz (GER)
Heavyweight (+78 kg)	Liu Huanyuan (CHN)	Belkıs Zehra Kaya (TUR)	Yu Song (CHN)

Source Results

=== Medal table ===
* Host nation (United Arab Emirates)

Rank	Nation	Gold	Silver	Bronze	Total
1	Russia (RUS)	3	3	1	7
2	Uzbekistan (UZB)	2	1	2	5
3	China (CHN)	2	1	1	4
4	Germany (GER)	2	0	1	3
5	Slovenia (SLO)	1	1	0	2
6	Austria (AUT)	1	0	1	2
6	Romania (ROU)	1	0	1	2
6	United States (USA)	1	0	1	2
9	Portugal (POR)	1	0	0	1
10	Italy (ITA)	0	2	0	2
11	Ukraine (UKR)	0	1	5	6
12	France (FRA)	0	1	3	4
13	Spain (ESP)	0	1	2	3
14	Brazil (BRA)	0	1	0	1
14	Egypt (EGY)	0	1	0	1
14	Turkey (TUR)	0	1	0	1
17	Netherlands (NED)	0	0	2	2
18	Algeria (ALG)	0	0	1	1
18	Armenia (ARM)	0	0	1	1
18	Czech Republic (CZE)	0	0	1	1
18	Greece (GRE)	0	0	1	1
18	Kyrgyzstan (KGZ)	0	0	1	1
18	Mongolia (MGL)	0	0	1	1
18	Poland (POL)	0	0	1	1
18	Switzerland (SUI)	0	0	1	1
Totals (25 entries)		14	14	28	56
