= Renat Mirzaliyev =

Ukrainian judoka

Personal information
- Born: 24 March 1982 (age 44)
- Occupation: Judoka

Sport
- Country: Ukraine
- Sport: Judo
- Weight class: –66 kg, –73 kg

Achievements and titles
- World Champ.: R32 (2010, 2011)
- European Champ.: (gold) (2001)
Medal record
Men's judo
Representing Ukraine
European Championships
Gold medal – first place	2001 Paris	–66 kg
World Juniors Championships
Gold medal – first place	2000 Nabeul	–66 kg

Profile at external databases
- IJF: 2850
- JudoInside.com: 3171
- Updated on 23 February 2022

Renat Mirzaliyev (born 24 March 1982) is an ethnic Azerbaijani judoka from Ukraine.

== Achievements ==
Year	Tournament	Place	Weight class
2001	European Judo Championships	1st	Half lightweight (66 kg)
