= 2013 Judo Grand Prix Miami =

Judo competition

Judo 2013 Judo Grand Prix Miami
- Location: Miami, United States
- Dates: 15–16 June 2013
- Competitors: 288 from 37 nations

Competition at external databases
- Links: IJF • JudoInside

The 2013 Judo Grand Prix Miami was held in Miami, United States from 15 to 16 June 2013.

== Medal summary ==
=== Men's events ===
Event	Gold	Silver	Bronze
Extra-lightweight (−60 kg)	Ganboldyn Kherlen (MGL)	Eric Takabatake (BRA)	Breno Alves (BRA)
Extra-lightweight (−60 kg)	Ganboldyn Kherlen (MGL)	Eric Takabatake (BRA)	Ashley McKenzie (GBR)
Half-lightweight (−66 kg)	Abdula Abdulzhalilov (RUS)	Yakub Shamilov (RUS)	Batgerel Battsetseg (MGL)
Half-lightweight (−66 kg)	Abdula Abdulzhalilov (RUS)	Yakub Shamilov (RUS)	Luiz Revite (BRA)
Lightweight (−73 kg)	Dirk Van Tichelt (BEL)	Miklós Ungvári (HUN)	Ugo Legrand (FRA)
Lightweight (−73 kg)	Dirk Van Tichelt (BEL)	Miklós Ungvári (HUN)	Kiyoshi Uematsu (ESP)
Half-middleweight (−81 kg)	Tom Reed (GBR)	Emmanuel Lucenti (ARG)	Tuvshinjargal Gan (MGL)
Half-middleweight (−81 kg)	Tom Reed (GBR)	Emmanuel Lucenti (ARG)	Mauro Moura (BRA)
Middleweight (−90 kg)	Asley González (CUB)	Grigorii Sulemin (RUS)	Colton Brown (USA)
Middleweight (−90 kg)	Asley González (CUB)	Grigorii Sulemin (RUS)	Ciril Grossklaus (SUI)
Half-heavyweight (−100 kg)	Zafar Makhmadov (RUS)	Hugo Pessanha (BRA)	Rafael Buzacarini (BRA)
Half-heavyweight (−100 kg)	Zafar Makhmadov (RUS)	Hugo Pessanha (BRA)	Radek Hecl (CZE)
Heavyweight (+100 kg)	Kim Soo-whan (KOR)	Renat Saidov (RUS)	Sugarjargal Boldpurev (MGL)
Heavyweight (+100 kg)	Kim Soo-whan (KOR)	Renat Saidov (RUS)	Walter Santos (BRA)

=== Women's events ===
Event	Gold	Silver	Bronze
Extra-lightweight (−48 kg)	Éva Csernoviczki (HUN)	Nathalia Brigida (BRA)	Alesya Kuznetsova (RUS)
Extra-lightweight (−48 kg)	Éva Csernoviczki (HUN)	Nathalia Brigida (BRA)	Paula Pareto (ARG)
Half-lightweight (−52 kg)	Yanet Bermoy (CUB)	Priscilla Gneto (FRA)	Adiyaasambuugiin Tsolmon (MGL)
Half-lightweight (−52 kg)	Yanet Bermoy (CUB)	Priscilla Gneto (FRA)	Ilse Heylen (BEL)
Lightweight (−57 kg)	Marti Malloy (USA)	Hedvig Karakas (HUN)	Jovana Rogić (SRB)
Lightweight (−57 kg)	Marti Malloy (USA)	Hedvig Karakas (HUN)	Miryam Roper (GER)
Half-middleweight (−63 kg)	Clarisse Agbegnenou (FRA)	Miki Tanaka (JPN)	Gévrise Émane (FRA)
Half-middleweight (−63 kg)	Clarisse Agbegnenou (FRA)	Miki Tanaka (JPN)	Maricet Espinosa (CUB)
Middleweight (−70 kg)	Iljana Marzok (GER)	Onix Cortés (CUB)	María Pérez (PUR)
Middleweight (−70 kg)	Iljana Marzok (GER)	Onix Cortés (CUB)	Haruka Tachimoto (JPN)
Half-heavyweight (−78 kg)	Audrey Tcheuméo (FRA)	Luise Malzahn (GER)	Anastasiya Dmitrieva (RUS)
Half-heavyweight (−78 kg)	Audrey Tcheuméo (FRA)	Luise Malzahn (GER)	Natalie Powell (GBR)
Heavyweight (+78 kg)	Megumi Tachimoto (JPN)	Mariya Shekerova (RUS)	Émilie Andéol (FRA)
Heavyweight (+78 kg)	Megumi Tachimoto (JPN)	Mariya Shekerova (RUS)	Idalys Ortiz (CUB)

Source Results

=== Medal table ===
* Host nation (United States)

Rank	Nation	Gold	Silver	Bronze	Total
1	Russia (RUS)	2	4	2	8
2	France (FRA)	2	1	3	6
3	Cuba (CUB)	2	1	2	5
4	Hungary (HUN)	1	2	0	3
5	Germany (GER)	1	1	1	3
5	Japan (JPN)	1	1	1	3
7	Mongolia (MGL)	1	0	4	5
8	Great Britain (GBR)	1	0	2	3
9	Belgium (BEL)	1	0	1	2
9	United States (USA)*	1	0	1	2
11	South Korea (KOR)	1	0	0	1
12	Brazil (BRA)	0	3	5	8
13	Argentina (ARG)	0	1	1	2
14	Czech Republic (CZE)	0	0	1	1
14	Puerto Rico (PUR)	0	0	1	1
14	Serbia (SRB)	0	0	1	1
14	Spain (ESP)	0	0	1	1
14	Switzerland (SUI)	0	0	1	1
Totals (18 entries)		14	14	28	56
