= Hasan Vanlıoğlu =

Turkish judoka (born 1988)

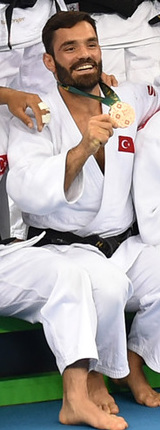
- Hasan Vanlioglu in 2017

Personal information
- Nationality: Turkish
- Born: 25 August 1988 (age 37)
- Occupation: Judoka

Sport
- Country: Turkey
- Sport: Judo
- Weight class: –73 kg

Achievements and titles
- World Champ.: R64 (2011, 2013)
- European Champ.: (bronze) (2011)
Medal record
Men's judo
Representing Turkey
European Championships
Bronze medal – third place	2011 Istanbul	–73 kg
IJF Grand Prix
Silver medal – second place	2015 Samsun	–73 kg
Silver medal – second place	2017 Antalya	–73 kg
Bronze medal – third place	2014 Samsun	–73 kg
Bronze medal – third place	2016 Samsun	–73 kg

Profile at external databases
- IJF: 2726
- JudoInside.com: 47619
- Updated on 14 November 2022

Hasan Vanlıoğlu (born 25 August 1988) is a Turkish judoka.

He is the silver medallist of the 2017 Judo Grand Prix Antalya in the -73 kg category.
