= 2012 Judo Grand Prix Düsseldorf =

Judo competition

Judo 2012 Judo Grand Prix Düsseldorf
- Location: Düsseldorf, Germany
- Dates: 18–19 February 2012
- Competitors: 554 from 86 nations

Competition at external databases
- Links: IJF • EJU • JudoInside

The 2012 Judo Grand Prix Düsseldorf was held in Düsseldorf, Germany from 18 to 19 February 2012. It was organised by the IJF.

== Medal summary ==
=== Men's events ===
Event	Gold	Silver	Bronze
Extra-lightweight (−60 kg)	Jin-Min Jang (KOR)	Ganbatyn Boldbaatar (MGL)	Tobias Englmaier (GER)
Extra-lightweight (−60 kg)	Jin-Min Jang (KOR)	Ganbatyn Boldbaatar (MGL)	Bekir Özlü (GEO)
Half-lightweight (−66 kg)	Alim Gadanov (RUS)	Khashbaataryn Tsagaanbaatar (MGL)	Choi Min-ho (KOR)
Half-lightweight (−66 kg)	Alim Gadanov (RUS)	Khashbaataryn Tsagaanbaatar (MGL)	Junpei Morishita (JPN)
Lightweight (−73 kg)	Wang Ki-chun (KOR)	Sainjargalyn Nyam-Ochir (MGL)	Dex Elmont (NED)
Lightweight (−73 kg)	Wang Ki-chun (KOR)	Sainjargalyn Nyam-Ochir (MGL)	Ugo Legrand (FRA)
Half-middleweight (−81 kg)	Ole Bischof (GER)	Alain Schmitt (FRA)	Elnur Mammadli (AZE)
Half-middleweight (−81 kg)	Ole Bischof (GER)	Alain Schmitt (FRA)	Loïc Pietri (FRA)
Middleweight (−90 kg)	Varlam Liparteliani (GEO)	Song Dae-nam (KOR)	Yves-Matthieu Dafreville (FRA)
Middleweight (−90 kg)	Varlam Liparteliani (GEO)	Song Dae-nam (KOR)	Lee Kyu-won (KOR)
Half-heavyweight (−100 kg)	Maxim Rakov (KAZ)	Hwang Hee-tae (KOR)	Ramadan Darwish (EGY)
Half-heavyweight (−100 kg)	Maxim Rakov (KAZ)	Hwang Hee-tae (KOR)	Zafar Makhmadov (RUS)
Heavyweight (+100 kg)	Andreas Tölzer (GER)	Adam Okruashvili (GEO)	Cho Gu-ham (KOR)
Heavyweight (+100 kg)	Andreas Tölzer (GER)	Adam Okruashvili (GEO)	Keiji Suzuki (JPN)

=== Women's events ===
Event	Gold	Silver	Bronze
Extra-lightweight (−48 kg)	Charline Van Snick (BEL)	Hiromi Endō (JPN)	Dayaris Mestre Álvarez (CUB)
Extra-lightweight (−48 kg)	Charline Van Snick (BEL)	Hiromi Endō (JPN)	Laëtitia Payet (FRA)
Half-lightweight (−52 kg)	Yuki Hashimoto (JPN)	Natalia Kuziutina (RUS)	Yanet Bermoy (CUB)
Half-lightweight (−52 kg)	Yuki Hashimoto (JPN)	Natalia Kuziutina (RUS)	Mönkhbaataryn Bundmaa (MGL)
Lightweight (−57 kg)	Kaori Matsumoto (JPN)	Anzu Yamamoto (JPN)	Dorjsürengiin Sumiyaa (MGL)
Lightweight (−57 kg)	Kaori Matsumoto (JPN)	Anzu Yamamoto (JPN)	Rafaela Silva (BRA)
Half-middleweight (−63 kg)	Joung Da-woon (KOR)	Clarisse Agbegnenou (FRA)	Claudia Malzahn (GER)
Half-middleweight (−63 kg)	Joung Da-woon (KOR)	Clarisse Agbegnenou (FRA)	Yarden Gerbi (ISR)
Middleweight (−70 kg)	Raša Sraka (SLO)	Maria Portela (BRA)	Onix Cortés (CUB)
Middleweight (−70 kg)	Raša Sraka (SLO)	Maria Portela (BRA)	Yoriko Kunihara (JPN)
Half-heavyweight (−78 kg)	Kayla Harrison (USA)	Yang Xiuli (CHN)	Marhinde Verkerk (NED)
Half-heavyweight (−78 kg)	Kayla Harrison (USA)	Yang Xiuli (CHN)	Heide Wollert (GER)
Heavyweight (+78 kg)	Lucija Polavder (SLO)	Kim Na-young (KOR)	Elena Ivashchenko (RUS)
Heavyweight (+78 kg)	Lucija Polavder (SLO)	Kim Na-young (KOR)	Idalys Ortiz (CUB)

Source Results

=== Medal table ===
* Host nation (Germany)

Rank	Nation	Gold	Silver	Bronze	Total
1	South Korea (KOR)	3	3	3	9
2	Japan (JPN)	2	2	3	7
3	Germany (GER)*	2	0	3	5
4	Slovenia (SLO)	2	0	0	2
5	Russia (RUS)	1	1	2	4
6	Georgia (GEO)	1	1	1	3
7	Belgium (BEL)	1	0	0	1
7	Kazakhstan (KAZ)	1	0	0	1
7	United States (USA)	1	0	0	1
10	Mongolia (MGL)	0	3	2	5
11	France (FRA)	0	2	4	6
12	Brazil (BRA)	0	1	1	2
13	China (CHN)	0	1	0	1
14	Cuba (CUB)	0	0	4	4
15	Netherlands (NED)	0	0	2	2
16	Azerbaijan (AZE)	0	0	1	1
16	Egypt (EGY)	0	0	1	1
16	Israel (ISR)	0	0	1	1
Totals (18 entries)		14	14	28	56
