= Sainjargalyn Nyam-Ochir =

Mongolian judoka (born 1986)

Personal information
- Native name: Сайнжаргалын Ням-Очир
- Nationality: Mongolia
- Born: 20 July 1986 (age 39) Uvs Province, Mongolia
- Occupation: Judoka
- Height: 1.74 m (5 ft 9 in) (2012)
- Weight: 73 kg (161 lb) (2012)

Sport
- Country: Mongolia
- Sport: Judo
- Weight class: –73 kg
- Rank: Honored Athlete of Mongolia in judo

Achievements and titles
- Olympic Games: (bronze) (2012)
- World Champ.: (bronze) (2015)
- Asian Champ.: (silver) (2013)
Medal record
Men's judo
Representing Mongolia
Olympic Games
Bronze medal – third place	2012 London	‍–‍73 kg
World Championships
Bronze medal – third place	2015 Astana	‍–‍73 kg
Bronze medal – third place	2015 Astana	Men's team
Asian Championships
Silver medal – second place	2013 Bangkok	‍–‍73 kg
Bronze medal – third place	2009 Taipei	‍–‍73 kg
World Masters
Gold medal – first place	2013 Tyumen	‍–‍73 kg
IJF Grand Slam
Gold medal – first place	2012 Paris	‍–‍73 kg
Silver medal – second place	2015 Baku	‍–‍73 kg
Bronze medal – third place	2012 Moscow	‍–‍73 kg
IJF Grand Prix
Gold medal – first place	2010 Düsseldorf	‍–‍73 kg
Gold medal – first place	2013 Ulaanbaatar	‍–‍73 kg
Gold medal – first place	2014 Tashkent	‍–‍73 kg
Silver medal – second place	2012 Düsseldorf	‍–‍73 kg
Silver medal – second place	2013 Samsun	‍–‍73 kg
Silver medal – second place	2015 Ulaanbaatar	‍–‍73 kg
Bronze medal – third place	2011 Qingdao	‍–‍73 kg
Bronze medal – third place	2014 Astana	‍–‍73 kg
Asian Junior Championships
Bronze medal – third place	2005 Beirut	‍–‍73 kg
Summer Universiade
Bronze medal – third place	2009 Belgrade	‍–‍73 kg

Profile at external databases
- IJF: 193
- JudoInside.com: 39948
- Updated on 25 May 2023

Sainjargalyn Nyam-Ochir (Mongolian: Сайнжаргалын Ням-Очир, born 20 July 1986) is a retired Mongolian judoka. In 2012, he won bronze at the 2012 Summer Olympics in the 73 kg category. He beat Christopher Völk in his first match, then Volodymyr Soroka before being beaten by Mansur Isaev in the quarterfinals. Because Isaev reached the final, Nyam-Ochir was entered into the repechage, where he beat Nicholas Delpopolo on the way to beating Dex Elmont in their bronze medal match.

As of 2019, Nyam-Ochir was a coach at Eastside Dojo in Plano, Texas.
