= 2004 European U23 Judo Championships =

Judo competition

Judo 2004 European U23 Judo Championships
- Location: Ljubljana, Slovenia
- Dates: 27–28 November 2004

Competition at external databases
- Links: JudoInside

The 2004 European U23 Judo Championships is an edition of the European U23 Judo Championships, organised by the International Judo Federation. It was held in Ljubljana, Slovenia from 27 to 28 November 2004.

== Medal summary ==
=== Medal table ===
* Host nation (Slovenia)

Rank	Nation	Gold	Silver	Bronze	Total
1	France (FRA)	5	2	0	7
2	Ukraine (UKR)	2	0	3	5
3	Italy (ITA)	1	1	1	3
4	Portugal (POR)	1	0	3	4
5	Hungary (HUN)	1	0	2	3
6	Azerbaijan (AZE)	1	0	1	2
6	Great Britain (GBR)	1	0	1	2
6	Turkey (TUR)	1	0	1	2
9	Greece (GRE)	1	0	0	1
10	Germany (GER)	0	2	3	5
11	Georgia (GEO)	0	2	0	2
11	Russia (RUS)	0	2	0	2
13	Slovenia (SLO)*	0	1	1	2
14	Austria (AUT)	0	1	0	1
14	Belgium (BEL)	0	1	0	1
14	Bulgaria (BUL)	0	1	0	1
14	Finland (FIN)	0	1	0	1
18	Poland (POL)	0	0	4	4
19	Belarus (BLR)	0	0	3	3
20	Spain (ESP)	0	0	2	2
21	Armenia (ARM)	0	0	1	1
21	Romania (ROU)	0	0	1	1
21	Serbia (SRB)	0	0	1	1
Totals (23 entries)		14	14	28	56

=== Men's events ===
Event	Gold	Silver	Bronze
Extra-lightweight (−60 kg)	Craig Fallon (GBR)	Vakhtangi Khositashvili (GEO)	Rok Drakšič (SLO)
Extra-lightweight (−60 kg)	Craig Fallon (GBR)	Vakhtangi Khositashvili (GEO)	Armen Nazaryan (ARM)
Half-lightweight (−66 kg)	Tariel Zintiridis (GRE)	Ahmed Ould-Saïd (FRA)	Pedro Dias (POR)
Half-lightweight (−66 kg)	Tariel Zintiridis (GRE)	Ahmed Ould-Saïd (FRA)	Tomasz Adamiec (POL)
Lightweight (−73 kg)	Marco Maddaloni (ITA)	Sašo Jereb (SLO)	Michael Möbius (GER)
Lightweight (−73 kg)	Marco Maddaloni (ITA)	Sašo Jereb (SLO)	Jesus Pardo (ESP)
Half-middleweight (−81 kg)	Vincent Massimino (FRA)	Khvicha Khutsishvili (GEO)	Elkhan Mammadov (AZE)
Half-middleweight (−81 kg)	Vincent Massimino (FRA)	Khvicha Khutsishvili (GEO)	Lukasz Balanda (POL)
Middleweight (−90 kg)	Thierry Fabre (FRA)	Bruno Ivan Tomasetti (ITA)	Daniel Brata (ROU)
Middleweight (−90 kg)	Thierry Fabre (FRA)	Bruno Ivan Tomasetti (ITA)	Andrei Kazusenok (BLR)
Half-heavyweight (−100 kg)	Dániel Hadfi (HUN)	Aleksey Ledenev (RUS)	Ryu Mijalkovic (SRB)
Half-heavyweight (−100 kg)	Dániel Hadfi (HUN)	Aleksey Ledenev (RUS)	Yuriy Snegovskoy (BLR)
Heavyweight (+100 kg)	Pierre Robin (FRA)	Ivan Iliev (BUL)	Olexiy Danilov (UKR)
Heavyweight (+100 kg)	Pierre Robin (FRA)	Ivan Iliev (BUL)	Barna Bor (HUN)

=== Women's events ===
Event	Gold	Silver	Bronze
Extra-lightweight (−48 kg)	Amel Bensemain (FRA)	Leen Dom (BEL)	Marie Muller (GER)
Extra-lightweight (−48 kg)	Amel Bensemain (FRA)	Leen Dom (BEL)	Ana Monteiro (POR)
Half-lightweight (−52 kg)	Caroline Lantoine (FRA)	Lyudmila Bogdanova (RUS)	Aynur Samat (TUR)
Half-lightweight (−52 kg)	Caroline Lantoine (FRA)	Lyudmila Bogdanova (RUS)	Joana Ramos (POR)
Lightweight (−57 kg)	Kifayat Gasimova (AZE)	Inga Gussenberg (GER)	Tatiana Chyk (UKR)
Lightweight (−57 kg)	Kifayat Gasimova (AZE)	Inga Gussenberg (GER)	Malgorzata Bielak (POL)
Half-middleweight (−63 kg)	Ana Cachola (POR)	Johanna Ylinen (FIN)	Carolina Prats (ESP)
Half-middleweight (−63 kg)	Ana Cachola (POR)	Johanna Ylinen (FIN)	Jana Degenhardt (GER)
Middleweight (−70 kg)	Maryna Pryshchepa (UKR)	Gévrise Émane (FRA)	Anita Budai (HUN)
Middleweight (−70 kg)	Maryna Pryshchepa (UKR)	Gévrise Émane (FRA)	Samantha Lowe (GBR)
Half-heavyweight (−78 kg)	Anastasiia Matrosova (UKR)	Marianne Hollensteiner-Morawek (AUT)	Gilda Rovere (ITA)
Half-heavyweight (−78 kg)	Anastasiia Matrosova (UKR)	Marianne Hollensteiner-Morawek (AUT)	Sviatlana Tsimashenka (BLR)
Heavyweight (+78 kg)	Belkıs Zehra Kaya (TUR)	Verena Birndorfer (GER)	Maryna Prokofyeva (UKR)
Heavyweight (+78 kg)	Belkıs Zehra Kaya (TUR)	Verena Birndorfer (GER)	Urszula Sadkowska (POL)

Source Results
