= Christopher Völk =

German judoka (born 1988)

Personal information
- Born: 15 September 1988 (age 37)
- Occupation: Judoka

Sport
- Country: Germany
- Sport: Judo
- Weight class: ‍–‍73 kg

Achievements and titles
- Olympic Games: R32 (2012)
- World Champ.: R32 (2010)
- European Champ.: R16 (2011)
Medal record
Men's judo
Representing Germany
IJF Grand Slam
Silver medal – second place	2011 Moscow	‍–‍73 kg
Silver medal – second place	2012 Paris	‍–‍73 kg
IJF Grand Prix
Gold medal – first place	2014 Samsun	‍–‍73 kg
Bronze medal – third place	2013 Rijeka	‍–‍73 kg
European Junior Championships
Bronze medal – third place	2007 Prague	‍–‍73 kg

Profile at external databases
- IJF: 1727
- JudoInside.com: 32162
- Updated on 27 November 2022

Christopher Völk (also spelled Voelk; born 15 September 1988 in Kempten) is a German judoka. He competed in the men's 73 kg event at the 2012 Summer Olympics and was eliminated by Nyam-Ochir Sainjargal in the second round.
