= Osman Murillo Segura =

Costa Rican judoka

Osman Murillo Segura (born September 18, 1985 in San Jose, Costa Rica) is a Costa Rican judoka. His father Omar Murillo Salazar is also his trainer who trained Osman since he was 5 years old at Judo San Francisco Academy. Osman is also well known in the Costarrican Judo Federation (Fecojudo) by all the National Sports Games hosted by the ICODER. He competed in the men's 73 kg event at the 2012 Summer Olympics and was eliminated by Egyptian judoka Hussein Hafiz in the second round.
