= Bruno Mendonça =

Brazilian judoka (born 1985)

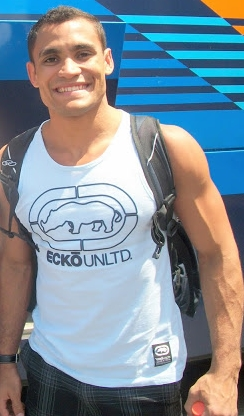

Personal information
- Full name: Bruno Mendonça Silva
- Born: 4 April 1985 (age 41) Santos, São Paulo
- Occupation: Judoka

Sport
- Country: Brazil
- Sport: Judo
- Weight class: ‍–‍73 kg

Achievements and titles
- Olympic Games: R16 (2012)
- World Champ.: R32 (2011, 2013)
- Pan American Champ.: (2011)
Medal record
Men's judo
Representing Brazil
Pan American Games
| Gold medal – first place | 2011 Guadalajara | ‍–‍73 kg |
Pan American Championships
| Gold medal – first place | 2011 Guadalajara | ‍–‍73 kg |
| Silver medal – second place | 2012 Montreal | ‍–‍73 kg |
| Bronze medal – third place | 2010 San Salvador | ‍–‍73 kg |
| Bronze medal – third place | 2013 San José | ‍–‍73 kg |
IJF Grand Slam
| Silver medal – second place | 2013 Paris | ‍–‍73 kg |
| Bronze medal – third place | 2010 Moscow | ‍–‍73 kg |

Profile at external databases
- IJF: 2458
- JudoInside.com: 66260
- Updated on 27 November 2022

Bruno Mendonça Silva (born 4 April 1985 in Santos, São Paulo) is a Brazilian judoka.

Silva won the gold medal in the 2011 Pan American Games in the Lightweight category of the Judo.

Silva competed in the men's 73 kg event at the 2012 Summer Olympics; after defeating Fred Yannick Uwase in the second round, he was eliminated by Dex Elmont in the third round.
