= Ahmed Goumar =

Nigerien judoka (born 1988)

Personal information
- Nationality: Nigerien
- Born: 22 February 1988 (age 38)

Sport
- Sport: Judo

Ahmed Goumar (born 22 February 1988) is a Nigerien judoka.

He competed at the 2016 Summer Olympics in Rio de Janeiro, in the men's 73 kg, where he was eliminated by Nicholas Delpopolo in the first round.
