= Künter Rothberg =

Estonian judoka (born 1984)

Personal information
- Born: 13 March 1984 (age 42)
- Occupation: Judoka

Sport
- Country: Estonia
- Sport: Judo
- Weight class: ‍–‍66 kg, ‍–‍73 kg

Achievements and titles
- World Champ.: R16 (2011)
- European Champ.: (bronze) (2006)
Medal record
Men's judo
Representing Estonia
European Championships
Bronze medal – third place	2006 Tampere	‍–‍66 kg

Profile at external databases
- IJF: 7
- JudoInside.com: 13742
- Updated on 17 November 2022

Künter Rothberg (born 13 March 1984 in Viljandi) is an Estonian judoka.

== Achievements ==
Year	Tournament	Place	Weight class
2006	European Judo Championships	3rd	Lightweight (66 kg)
