= Adrian Leat =

New Zealand judoka

Personal information
- Full name: Adrian Leat
- Nationality: New Zealand
- Born: 22 September 1987 (age 38) Subiaco, Western Australia, Australia

Sport
- Country: New Zealand
- Sport: Judo
- Event: Men's 73 kg
Medal record
Representing New Zealand
Judo
Commonwealth Games
Silver medal – second place	2014 Glasgow	Men's 73 kg
- Updated on 26 July 2014

Adrian Leat (born 22 September 1987) is a New Zealand judoka. He competed in the Men's 73 kg event at the 2014 Commonwealth Games where he won the silver medal. His older brother Alister Leat was also a representative judoka.

Leat attended Birkenhead College and has a Master's degree in Architecture from Unitec Institute of Technology, completed in 2012.
