= Josue Deprez =

Haitian judoka

Personal information
- Nationality: Haitian
- Born: 30 October 1981 (age 44) port-au-prince
- Height: 5'11
- Weight: 165 lb (75 kg)
- Website: www.josuedeprez.com

Sport
- Country: Haiti
- Sport: Judo
- Club: Hikoshi-aida
- Coached by: fritzlauran Demorcy
- Retired: August 15/2016
- Now coaching: deprezjudo judo club

Achievements and titles
- Olympic finals: 2008-2016

Josue Deprez (born 30 October 1981) is a Haitian judoka.

He competed at the 2016 Summer Olympics in Rio de Janeiro, in the men's 73 kg, where he was eliminated by Igor Wandtke in the first round.
