= Danny Williams (judoka) =

British judoka (born 1989)

Personal information
- Nationality: British (English)
- Born: 20 April 1989 (age 37)
- Occupation: Judoka

Sport
- Sport: Judo
- Weight class: –73 kg
Medal record
Men's judo
Representing England
Commonwealth Games
Gold medal – first place	2014 Glasgow	-73 kg

Profile at external databases
- JudoInside.com: 47353

Daniel Williams (born 20 April 1989, in Shrewsbury) is a British judoka. After his judo retirement, he decided to make a new brand named Kosmos.

== Judo career ==
Williams became champion of Great Britain, winning the lightweight division at the British Judo Championships in 2011. The following year he competed in the men's 73 kg event at the 2012 Summer Olympics and was eliminated by Rasul Boqiev in the second round.

He won the gold medal in the 73 kg category at the 2014 Commonwealth Games in Scotland.
