= Tomasz Adamiec =

Polish judoka (born 1982)

Personal information
- Born: 13 April 1982 (age 44)
- Occupation: Judoka

Sport
- Sport: Judo
- Weight class: –66 kg, –73 kg

Achievements and titles
- Olympic Games: R32 (2008, 2012)
- World Champ.: R16 (2011)
- European Champ.: (bronze) (2007)
Medal record
Men's judo
Representing Poland
European Championships
Bronze medal – third place	2007 Belgrade	–66 kg
IJF Grand Prix
Bronze medal – third place	2009 Tunis	–73 kg
Bronze medal – third place	2009 Abu Dhabi	–73 kg
Bronze medal – third place	2010 Rotterdam	–73 kg
European U23 Championships
Bronze medal – third place	2004 Ljubljana	–66 kg
World Juniors Championships
Bronze medal – third place	2000 Nabeul	–66 kg

Profile at external databases
- IJF: 750
- JudoInside.com: 13486
- Updated on 12 February 2022

Tomasz Adamiec (born 13 April 1982) is a Polish judoka.

== Achievements ==
Year	Tournament	Place	Weight class
2007	European Judo Championships	3rd	Half lightweight (66 kg)
2004	European Judo Championships	7th	Half lightweight (66 kg)
