= Cheung Chi Yip =

Hong Kong judoka

Personal information
- Born: 26 December 1986 (age 38)
- Occupation: Judoka

Sport
- Sport: Judo

Profile at external databases
- JudoInside.com: 43458

Cheung Chi Yip (Chinese: 張志業; Jyutping: zoeng^{1} zi^{3} jip^{6}; born December 26, 1986, in Hong Kong) is a Hong Konger judoka. He competed in the men's 73 kg event at the 2012 Summer Olympics and was eliminated in the second round by Nicholas Delpopolo.
