= David Papaux =

Swiss judoka

David Papaux (born May 27, 1981, in Fribourg) is a Swiss judoka. He won the Sierre Tournament in 2005, the Swedish Open Borås in 2006, the Tournament Morges in 2011, and the Tournoi Fontaines in 2012. He also won nine Swiss Championships competitions between 2002 and 2013.
