= Nicholas Tritton =

Canadian judoka (born 1984)

Personal information
- Born: 20 July 1984 (age 42) Guelph, Ontario, Canada
- Occupation: Judoka

Sport
- Country: Canada
- Sport: Judo
- Weight class: –73 kg

Achievements and titles
- Olympic Games: R32 (2008, 2012)
- World Champ.: 9th (2007)
- Pan American Champ.: (2010)
Medal record
Men's judo
Representing Canada
Pan American Games
Bronze medal – third place	2007 Rio de Janeiro	–73 kg
Bronze medal – third place	2011 Guadalajara	–73 kg
Pan American Championships
Gold medal – first place	2010 San Salvador	–73 kg
Silver medal – second place	2009 Buenos Aires	–73 kg
Bronze medal – third place	2007 Montreal	–73 kg
Bronze medal – third place	2008 Miami	–73 kg
Bronze medal – third place	2011 Guadalajara	–73 kg
IJF Grand Slam
Bronze medal – third place	2009 Tokyo	–73 kg
Bronze medal – third place	2010 Tokyo	–73 kg

Profile at external databases
- IJF: 126
- JudoInside.com: 19149
- Updated on 28 November 2022

Nicholas "Nick" Tritton (born 20 July 1984 in Guelph, Ontario) is a male judoka who grew up in the Perth/Lanark area of Ontario Canada. He was a member of Canada's National Team for more than ten years and won many medals domestically and internationally including 13 medals on the Grand Slam, Grand Prix and World Cup circuit including back to back bronze medals at the prestigious Tokyo Grand Slam as well as the bronze medal in the men's lightweight division (– 73 kg) at the 2007 Pan American Games, alongside Cuba's Ronald Girones and another bronze at the 2011 Pan American Games in Mexico. He represented Canada in the sport of Judo at the 2008 Summer & 2012 Summer Olympics and at five World Championships. He won 5 medals at the Pan American Judo Championships (bronze in 2007, 2008 & 2011, silver in 2009 and gold in 2010 - missed 2012 due to injury). He also earned a bronze medal at the 2005 Francophone Games and a silver at the 2009 Francophone Games.

He retired from judo competition after the 2012 Olympics due to health and funding issues and then tried his hand at Sambo competition at the urging of the Canadian Sambo Federation. In the sport of Sambo Nick has thus far competed at three events: the 2014 Commonwealth Sambo Championships held in London England where he won an impressive 6 matches to earn gold in his first ever Sambo event, the 2014 President's Cup (a team event) also held in London England at the same time (where he won 3 of 4 matches) and the 2014 World Sambo Championships held in Japan where he placed 7th. Tritton now runs a private gym in Montreal offering personal training, judo, wrestling and sambo.

== See also ==
- Judo in Ontario
- Judo in Canada
- List of Canadian judoka
