= Ronald Girones =

Cuban Olympic judoka

Personal information
- Born: May 10, 1983 (age 43)
- Occupation: Judoka

Sport
- Sport: Judo
Medal record
Men's Judo
Representing Cuba
Pan American Games
Bronze medal – third place	2007 Rio de Janeiro	–73 kg
Pan American Judo Championships
Silver medal – second place	2011 Guadalajara	–73 kg
Bronze medal – third place	2010 San Salvador	–73 kg
Central American and Caribbean Games
Gold medal – first place	2006 Cartagena	-73 kg

Profile at external databases
- JudoInside.com: 16126

Ronald Girones (born May 10, 1983, in Guantánamo) is a male judoka from Cuba, who won the bronze medal in the men's lightweight division (– 73 kg) at the 2007 Pan American Games, alongside Canada's Nicholas Tritton. He represented his native country at the 2008 Summer Olympics.
