= Hussein Hafiz =

Egyptian judoka (born 1985)

Personal information
- Nationality: Egypt
- Born: 5 September 1985 (age 40) Cairo, Egypt
- Occupation: Judoka
- Height: 175 cm (5.74 ft)
- Weight: 73 kg (161 lb)

Sport
- Country: Egypt
- Sport: Judo
- Event: -73 kg
- Club: El Shams Sporting Club

Achievements and titles
- Olympic Games: London 2012
Medal record
Men's Judo
Representing Egypt
All-Africa Games
Bronze medal – third place	2011 Maputo	-73 kg
Pan Arab Games
Gold medal – first place	2011 Doha	-73 kg

Profile at external databases
- JudoInside.com: 45935

Hussein Hafiz (born September 5, 1985, in Cairo) is an Egyptian judoka. He competed in the men's 73 kg event at the 2012 Summer Olympics; after defeating Osman Murillo Segura in the second round, he was eliminated by Ugo Legrand in the third round.
