= Mansur Isaev =

Russian judoka (born 1986)

Personal information
- Full name: Mansur Mustafayevich Isayev
- Born: 23 September 1986 (age 39) Kizilyurt, Dagestan, Russia
- Occupation: Judoka
- Height: 172 cm (5 ft 8 in)

Sport
- Country: Russia
- Sport: Judo
- Weight class: –73 kg

Achievements and titles
- Olympic Games: (gold) (2012)
- World Champ.: (bronze) (2009)
- European Champ.: 5th (2009)
Medal record
Men's judo
Representing Russia
Olympic Games
Gold medal – first place	2012 London	‍–‍73 kg
World Championships
Bronze medal – third place	2009 Rotterdam	‍–‍73 kg
World Masters
Silver medal – second place	2011 Baku	‍–‍73 kg
Bronze medal – third place	2010 Suwon	‍–‍73 kg
Bronze medal – third place	2012 Almaty	‍–‍73 kg
IJF Grand Slam
Silver medal – second place	2011 Tokyo	‍–‍73 kg
Bronze medal – third place	2009 Moscow	‍–‍73 kg
Bronze medal – third place	2009 Rio de Janeiro	‍–‍73 kg
IJF Grand Prix
Gold medal – first place	2009 Hamburg	‍–‍73 kg
Gold medal – first place	2010 Abu Dhabi	‍–‍73 kg
Silver medal – second place	2011 Amsterdam	‍–‍73 kg
Silver medal – second place	2013 Abu Dhabi	‍–‍73 kg
Bronze medal – third place	2010 Qingdao	‍–‍73 kg
European U23 Championships
Gold medal – first place	2008 Zagreb	‍–‍73 kg

Profile at external databases
- IJF: 358
- JudoInside.com: 30027
- Updated on 25 May 2023

Mansur Mustafaevich Isaev (Russian: Мансур Мустафаевич Исаев; born 23 September 1986 in Kizilyurt, Dagestan) is a Russian judoka. He won the gold medal at the 2012 Summer Olympics in the -73 kg class against Japanese judoka Riki Nakaya. This was Russia's second gold medal at the Games, after judoka Arsen Galstyan's victory two days earlier in Men's 60 kg.
