= Edson Madeira =

Mozambican judoka

Personal information
- Full name: Edson Marcelo da Silva Madeira
- Nationality: Mozambique
- Born: 18 May 1985 (age 41)
- Occupation: Judoka
- Height: 1.78 m (5 ft 10 in)
- Weight: 66 kg (146 lb)

Sport
- Sport: Judo
- Event: 66 kg

Achievements and titles

Profile at external databases
- JudoInside.com: 47309

Edson Marcelo da Silva Madeira (born 18 May 1985) is a Mozambican judoka, who competed in the half-lightweight division (66 kg). He achieved numerous fifth and seventh-place finishes at the African Championships within a span of five years. Madeira made his official debut at the 2008 Summer Olympics in Beijing, and qualified for the men's 66-kg division. He was eliminated in the first round, after being defeated by Dex Elmont of the Netherlands, who automatically scored an ippon.
