= Kyle Maxwell =

Barbadian judoka

Personal information
- Full name: Kyle Maxwell
- Nationality: Barbadian
- Born: December 1, 1990 (age 35) Bridgetown, Barbados

Sport
- Country: Barbados
- Sport: Judo
- Weight class: 73 kg

Achievements and titles
- Olympic finals: 2012 Summer Olympics

Kyle Maxwell (born December 1, 1990, in Bridgetown) is a Barbadian judoka. He competed in the men's 73 kg event at the 2012 Summer Olympics and was eliminated in the second round by Riki Nakaya. At the 2014 Commonwealth Games, he was defeated in the last-32 by Ashaan Nelson. He won bronze at the 2011 Caribbean Championships.
