= Wang Ki-chun =

South Korean judoka (born 1988)

Wang Kichun
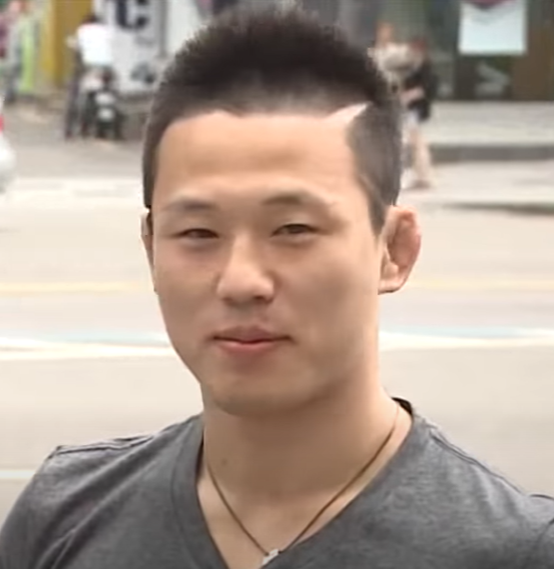

Personal information
- Born: 13 September 1988 (age 38) Jeongeup, South Korea
- Home town: Daegu, South Korea
- Education: Yongin University
- Occupation: Judoka
- Height: 171 cm (5 ft 7 in)

Korean name
- Hangul: 왕기춘
- Hanja: 王機春
- RR: Wang Gichun
- MR: Wang Kich'un

Sport
- Country: South Korea
- Sport: Judo
- Weight class: –73 kg, –81 kg
- Rank: 2nd dan black belt
- Team: South Korea National Team; Yangju City Hall
- Coached by: Jang Moon-kyung; Song Dae-nam

Achievements and titles
- Olympic Games: (silver) (2008)
- World Champ.: (gold) (2007, 2009)
- Asian Champ.: (gold) (2011, 2012)
Medal record
Men's judo
Representing South Korea
Olympic Games
| Silver medal – second place | 2008 Beijing | ‍–‍73 kg |
World Championships
| Gold medal – first place | 2007 Rio de Janeiro | ‍–‍73 kg |
| Gold medal – first place | 2009 Rotterdam | ‍–‍73 kg |
| Bronze medal – third place | 2010 Tokyo | ‍–‍73 kg |
Asian Games
| Silver medal – second place | 2010 Guangzhou | ‍–‍73 kg |
Asian Championships
| Gold medal – first place | 2011 Abu Dhabi | ‍–‍73 kg |
| Gold medal – first place | 2012 Tashkent | ‍–‍73 kg |
| Bronze medal – third place | 2013 Bangkok | ‍–‍73 kg |
World Masters
| Gold medal – first place | 2011 Baku | ‍–‍73 kg |
| Gold medal – first place | 2012 Almaty | ‍–‍73 kg |
IJF Grand Slam
| Gold medal – first place | 2008 Tokyo | ‍–‍73 kg |
| Gold medal – first place | 2009 Paris | ‍–‍73 kg |
| Gold medal – first place | 2009 Moscow | ‍–‍73 kg |
| Gold medal – first place | 2009 Tokyo | ‍–‍73 kg |
| Gold medal – first place | 2010 Paris | ‍–‍73 kg |
| Bronze medal – third place | 2015 Tokyo | ‍–‍81 kg |
| Bronze medal – third place | 2016 Paris | ‍–‍81 kg |
IJF Grand Prix
| Gold medal – first place | 2011 Abu Dhabi | ‍–‍73 kg |
| Gold medal – first place | 2011 Qingdao | ‍–‍73 kg |
| Gold medal – first place | 2012 Düsseldorf | ‍–‍73 kg |
| Gold medal – first place | 2015 Qingdao | ‍–‍81 kg |
| Silver medal – second place | 2014 Ulaanbaatar | ‍–‍81 kg |
| Silver medal – second place | 2016 Samsun | ‍–‍81 kg |
| Bronze medal – third place | 2013 Düsseldorf | ‍–‍73 kg |
| Bronze medal – third place | 2014 Jeju | ‍–‍81 kg |
World Juniors Championships
| Bronze medal – third place | 2006 Santo Domingo | ‍–‍73 kg |
Summer Universiade
| Gold medal – first place | 2009 Belgrade | ‍–‍73 kg |
| Gold medal – first place | 2013 Kazan | ‍–‍73 kg |
| Silver medal – second place | 2013 Kazan | Men's team |
| Silver medal – second place | 2015 Gwangju | ‍–‍81 kg |

Profile at external databases
- IJF: 69
- JudoInside.com: 43428
- Updated on 30 May 2023

Wang Ki-Chun (Korean: 왕기춘, Korean pronunciation: [waŋ.ɡi.tɕʰun]; born 13 September 1988 in Jeongeup, North Jeolla Province) is a former judoka from South Korea.

He became known for beating the 2004 Olympic champion Lee Won-Hee in the qualification matches for the 2007 World Championships and the 2008 Olympic Games.

Wang won the world title at the age of 19 at the 2007 World Championships in Rio de Janeiro, Brazil.

He was the favorite for winning the gold medal in the 2008 Olympic Games, however, Wang suffered ribcage fracture when Brazil's Leandro Guilheiro hit him with an elbow in the quarterfinal. Despite fighting through injury, Wang was beaten in the final by Elnur Mammadli from Azerbaijan and had to settle for silver medal. He made up for it in the 2009 World Judo Championships by winning the 73 kg final against North Korean Kim Chol-Su.

After winning the 2010 Paris Grand Slam he did not compete until the 2010 World Championships Tokyo and lost to Hiroyuki Akimoto in the semi-finals and had to settle with the bronze.

He did not medal at the 2011 World Championships in Paris, crashing out early to Ugo Legrand of France. He faced him again in the 2012 Summer Olympics in the fight for bronze, losing again.

In his prime, Wang was known for his physical fighting style, and his deadly tai otoshi and seoi nage.

== Disciplinary issues ==
In 2009, Wang assaulted a female club patron, slapping her face after an altercation. No charges were pressed after he reached a settlement with the victim.

Wang was in controversy again in 2014, when he was detained for eight days by the Republic of Korea Army's military police for using his mobile phone while serving his national service. He was caught using his phone again a week later, and was sent to the military correctional facility.

On May 2, 2020, Wang was arrested on charges of sexually assaulting a minor. The Daegu District Court sentenced him to 6 years in prison. The Korea Judo Association subsequently banned Wang for life from judo following the charges for greatly damaging the integrity and social standing of judo.
