= Aleni Smith =

Samoan judoka (born 1982)

Aleni Smith (born December 5, 1982) is a Samoan judoka. He competed in the men's 73 kg event at the 2012 Summer Olympics and was eliminated by Jaromír Ježek in the second round.
