= Emmanuel Nartey =

Ghanaian judoka

Personal information
- Born: 18 April 1983 (age 42)
- Occupation: Judoka

Sport
- Sport: Judo

Profile at external databases
- JudoInside.com: 26435

Emmanuel K Nartey (born 18 April 1983 in Accra), is a Ghanaian judoka. He competed in the men's 73 kg event at the 2012 Summer Olympics and was eliminated by Dex Elmont in the second round. He was the first judoka to represent Ghana at the Olympic Games. He also competed at the 2014 Commonwealth Games, where he was ejected following a dispute with officials. He won bronze at the 2015 African Games in the men's 73 kg.

Nartey studied at the University of the West of England and received his doctorate in international law and human rights from the University of East London. He serves in the British Army. He is the author of a book titled "My Olympic Dream".
