= Volodymyr Soroka =

Ukrainian judoka (born 1982)

Personal information
- Born: 25 December 1982 (age 43)
- Occupation: Judoka

Sport
- Country: Ukraine
- Sport: Judo
- Weight class: ‍–‍73 kg

Achievements and titles
- Olympic Games: R16 (2012)
- World Champ.: R16 (2009)
- European Champ.: (gold) (2009)
Medal record
Men's judo
Representing Ukraine
European Championships
Gold medal – first place	2009 Tbilisi	‍–‍73 kg
Silver medal – second place	2012 Chelyabinsk	‍–‍73 kg
IJF Grand Prix
Gold medal – first place	2010 Tunis	‍–‍73 kg
Silver medal – second place	2010 Abu Dhabi	‍–‍73 kg
Bronze medal – third place	2009 Abu Dhabi	‍–‍73 kg

Profile at external databases
- IJF: 655
- JudoInside.com: 16629
- Updated on 14 November 2022

Volodymyr Soroka (born 25 December 1982 in Kyiv) is a Ukrainian judoka. He won the gold medal in the under–73 kg category at the 2009 European Judo Championships in Tbilisi, Georgia, and the silver at the 2012 European Championships. At the 2012 Olympics, he reached the third round.
