= Dirk Van Tichelt =

Belgian judoka

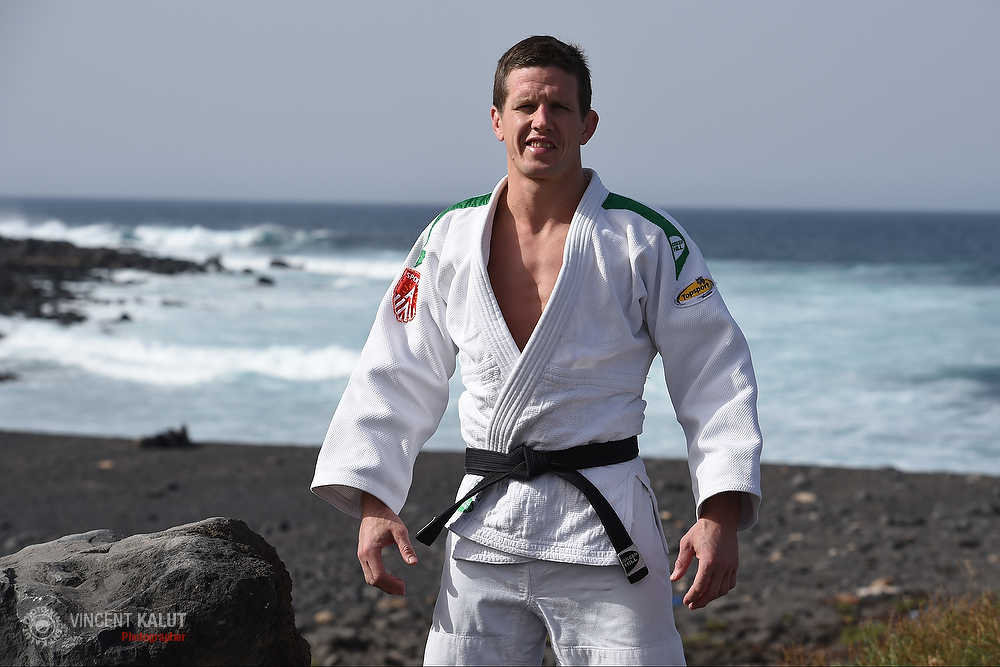
- Van Tichelt in 2016

Personal information
- Born: 10 June 1984 (age 42) Turnhout, Belgium
- Education: Vrije Universiteit Brussel.
- Occupation: Judo coach
- Height: 173 cm (5 ft 8 in)

Sport
- Country: Belgium
- Sport: Judo
- Weight class: ‍–‍73 kg

Achievements and titles
- Olympic Games: (bronze) (2016)
- World Champ.: (bronze) (2009, 2013)
- European Champ.: (gold) (2008)
Medal record
Men's judo
Representing Belgium
Olympic Games
Bronze medal – third place	2016 Rio de Janeiro	‍–‍73 kg
World Championships
Bronze medal – third place	2009 Rotterdam	‍–‍73 kg
Bronze medal – third place	2013 Rio de Janeiro	‍–‍73 kg
European Games
Bronze medal – third place	2015 Baku	‍–‍73 kg
European Championships
Gold medal – first place	2008 Lisbon	‍–‍73 kg
IJF Grand Slam
Gold medal – first place	2009 Rio de Janeiro	‍–‍73 kg
Gold medal – first place	2013 Moscow	‍–‍73 kg
Silver medal – second place	2009 Moscow	‍–‍73 kg
Bronze medal – third place	2010 Rio de Janeiro	‍–‍73 kg
Bronze medal – third place	2010 Tokyo	‍–‍73 kg
Bronze medal – third place	2011 Moscow	‍–‍73 kg
Bronze medal – third place	2011 Tokyo	‍–‍73 kg
IJF Grand Prix
Gold medal – first place	2009 Abu Dhabi	‍–‍73 kg
Gold medal – first place	2011 Düsseldorf	‍–‍73 kg
Gold medal – first place	2012 Qingdao	‍–‍73 kg
Gold medal – first place	2013 Miami	‍–‍73 kg
Silver medal – second place	2009 Qingdao	‍–‍73 kg
Silver medal – second place	2014 Qingdao	‍–‍73 kg
Silver medal – second place	2015 Jeju	‍–‍73 kg
Bronze medal – third place	2009 Hamburg	‍–‍73 kg
Bronze medal – third place	2009 Tunis	‍–‍73 kg
Bronze medal – third place	2010 Tunis	‍–‍73 kg
Bronze medal – third place	2014 Jeju	‍–‍73 kg
Bronze medal – third place	2015 Budapest	‍–‍73 kg
European U23 Championships
Silver medal – second place	2006 Moscow	‍–‍73 kg

Profile at external databases
- IJF: 326
- JudoInside.com: 13784
- Updated on 24 May 2023

Dirk Van Tichelt (born 10 June 1984) is a Belgian judoka.

Van Tichelt's biggest achievement was his 2008 European title in Lisbon. At the same year, at the Beijing Olympics he came fifth after losing in the first round to gold-medallist Elnur Mammadli and later losing in the bronze medal match to Rasul Boqiev. At the 2009 World Championships, he reached the semi-finals but there he lost to Kim Chol-Su. In the bronze medal match he beat Sezer Huysuz to take his first bronze medal at a world championships. At the 2013 World Championships, he again won bronze, losing to eventual champion Shohei Ono in the semi-final and beating Dastan Ykybayev in his bronze medal match.

At the 2016 Summer Olympics, Van Tichelt won a bronze medal against Miklós Ungvári.

Van Tichelt studied at Vrije Universiteit Brussel.

== Achievements ==
Year	Tournament	Place	Weight class
2008	European Championships	1st	Lightweight (−73 kg)
2008	Summer Olympics	5th	Lightweight (−73 kg)
2009	World Judo Championships	3rd	Lightweight (73 kg)
2016	Summer Olympics	3rd	Lightweight (73 kg)
