= Dex Elmont =

Dutch judoka (born 1984)

Personal information
- Full name: Daxenos Richard René Elmont
- Born: 10 January 1984 (age 42) Rotterdam, Netherlands
- Occupation: Judoka

Sport
- Country: Netherlands
- Sport: Judo
- Weight class: –66 kg, –73 kg

Achievements and titles
- Olympic Games: 5th (2012)
- World Champ.: (silver) (2010, 2011)
- European Champ.: (gold) (2014)
Medal record
Men's judo
Representing the Netherlands
World Championships
Silver medal – second place	2010 Tokyo	‍–‍73 kg
Silver medal – second place	2011 Paris	‍–‍73 kg
Bronze medal – third place	2013 Rio de Janeiro	‍–‍73 kg
European Championships
Gold medal – first place	2014 Montpellier	‍–‍73 kg
Silver medal – second place	2009 Tbilisi	‍–‍73 kg
Bronze medal – third place	2012 Chelyabinsk	‍–‍73 kg
World Masters
Silver medal – second place	2013 Tyumen	‍–‍73 kg
IJF Grand Slam
Gold medal – first place	2011 Moscow	‍–‍73 kg
Gold medal – first place	2014 Abu Dhabi	‍–‍73 kg
Bronze medal – third place	2013 Paris	‍–‍73 kg
IJF Grand Prix
Gold medal – first place	2011 Amsterdam	‍–‍73 kg
Gold medal – first place	2014 Zagreb	‍–‍73 kg
Silver medal – second place	2010 Rotterdam	‍–‍73 kg
Silver medal – second place	2013 Düsseldorf	‍–‍73 kg
Bronze medal – third place	2010 Abu Dhabi	‍–‍73 kg
Bronze medal – third place	2011 Baku	‍–‍73 kg
Bronze medal – third place	2012 Düsseldorf	‍–‍73 kg
Bronze medal – third place	2015 Samsun	‍–‍73 kg
European Junior Championships
Gold medal – first place	2003 Sarajevo	‍–‍66 kg
Bronze medal – third place	2002 Rotterdam	‍–‍66 kg

Profile at external databases
- IJF: 277
- JudoInside.com: 9348
- Updated on 5 July 2023

Daxenos Richard René "Dex" Elmont (born 10 January 1984 in Rotterdam) is a Dutch retired judoka.

His father Ricardo is a former judoka himself, who represented Suriname at the 1976 Summer Olympics in Montreal, Quebec, Canada. His older brother Guillaume is also competing on the highest level in judo.

== Achievements ==
Year	Tournament	Place	Weight class
2014	ECCO Team Challenge	1st	Lightweight (73 kg)
2013	World Judo Championships	3rd	Lightweight (73 kg)
2012	European Judo Championships	3rd	Lightweight (73 kg)
2011	World Judo Championships	2nd	Lightweight (73 kg)
2010	World Judo Championships	2nd	Lightweight (73 kg)
2009	European Judo Championships	2nd	Lightweight (73 kg)
2008	European Judo Championships	5th	Half lightweight (66 kg)
2007	European Judo Championships	5th	Half lightweight (66 kg)
2005	World Judo Championships	7th	Half lightweight (66 kg)
