= 2004 Pan American Judo Championships =

Judo competition

2004 Judo Pan American Judo Championships
- Venue: Margarita Island
- Location: Margarita Island, Venezuela
- Dates: 19–24 April 2004

Competition at external databases
- Links: JudoInside

The 2004 Pan American Judo Championships in Margarita Island, Venezuela from 19 April to 24 April 2004.

== Medal overview ==
=== Men's events ===
Event	Gold	Silver	Bronze
–55 kg	Robert Gómez (DOM)	Mariano Russo (ARG)	Daniel Martínez (VEN)
–55 kg	Robert Gómez (DOM)	Mariano Russo (ARG)	Jhonny Guaca (COL)
–60 kg	Reiver Alvarenga (VEN)	Gonzalo Ibanez (CAN)	Modesto Lara (DOM)
–60 kg	Reiver Alvarenga (VEN)	Gonzalo Ibanez (CAN)	Ángelo Gómez (CUB)
–66 kg	Leandro Cunha (BRA)	Yordanis Arencibia (CUB)	Justin Flores (USA)
–66 kg	Leandro Cunha (BRA)	Yordanis Arencibia (CUB)	Melvin Méndez (PUR)
–73 kg	Jimmy Pedro (USA)	Richard León (VEN)	Rodrigo Lucenti (ARG)
–73 kg	Jimmy Pedro (USA)	Richard León (VEN)	Rubert Martínez (CUB)
–81 kg	Flávio Canto (BRA)	Gabriel Arteaga (CUB)	Ariel Sganga (ARG)
–81 kg	Flávio Canto (BRA)	Gabriel Arteaga (CUB)	Álvaro Paseyro (URU)
–90 kg	Carlos Honorato (BRA)	Brian Olson (USA)	Eduardo Costa (ARG)
–90 kg	Carlos Honorato (BRA)	Brian Olson (USA)	Yosvany Despaigne (CUB)
–100 kg	Oreydis Despaigne (CUB)	Mário Sabino (BRA)	Rhadi Ferguson (USA)
–100 kg	Oreydis Despaigne (CUB)	Mário Sabino (BRA)	Andrés Loforte (ARG)
+100 kg	Leonel Ruiz (VEN)	Daniel Hernandes (BRA)	Joel Brutus (HAI)
+100 kg	Leonel Ruiz (VEN)	Daniel Hernandes (BRA)	Rigoberto Trujillo (CUB)
Openweight	Carlos Honorato (BRA)	Juan Díaz (VEN)	Rigoberto Trujillo (CUB)
Openweight	Carlos Honorato (BRA)	Juan Díaz (VEN)	Franklin Pérez (DOM)

=== Women's events ===
Event	Gold	Silver	Bronze
–44 kg	Johanna Brizuela (VEN)	Andrea Collazo (COL)	Not awarded
–44 kg	Johanna Brizuela (VEN)	Andrea Collazo (COL)	Not awarded
–48 kg	Yamila Zambrano (CUB)	Daniela Polzin (BRA)	Carolyne Lepage (CAN)
–48 kg	Yamila Zambrano (CUB)	Daniela Polzin (BRA)	Lisseth Orozco (COL)
–52 kg	Amarilis Savón (CUB)	Charlee Minkin (USA)	María García (DOM)
–52 kg	Amarilis Savón (CUB)	Charlee Minkin (USA)	Flor Velázquez (VEN)
–57 kg	Danielle Zangrando (BRA)	Yurisleidy Lupetey (CUB)	Yadinis Amarís (COL)
–57 kg	Danielle Zangrando (BRA)	Yurisleidy Lupetey (CUB)	Jessica García (PUR)
–63 kg	Ronda Rousey (USA)	Érica Moraes (BRA)	Marie-Hélène Chisholm (CAN)
–63 kg	Ronda Rousey (USA)	Érica Moraes (BRA)	Audrey Puello (DOM)
–70 kg	Anaysi Hernández (CUB)	Elizabeth Copes (ARG)	Christina Yannetsos (USA)
–70 kg	Anaysi Hernández (CUB)	Elizabeth Copes (ARG)	Diana Chalá (ECU)
–78 kg	Edinanci Silva (BRA)	Lorena Briceño (ARG)	Yalennis Castillo (CUB)
–78 kg	Edinanci Silva (BRA)	Lorena Briceño (ARG)	Keivi Pinto (VEN)
+78 kg	Giovanna Blanco (VEN)	Carmen Chalá (ECU)	Vanessa Zambotti (MEX)
+78 kg	Giovanna Blanco (VEN)	Carmen Chalá (ECU)	Priscila Marques (BRA)
Openweight	Giovanna Blanco (VEN)	Carmen Chalá (ECU)	Yalennis Castillo (CUB)
Openweight	Giovanna Blanco (VEN)	Carmen Chalá (ECU)	Verónica Mendoza (ESA)

== Medals table ==
Rank	Nation	Gold	Silver	Bronze	Total
1	Brazil	6	4	1	11
2	Venezuela	5	2	3	10
3	Cuba	4	3	7	14
4	United States	2	2	3	7
5	Dominican Republic	1	0	4	5
6	Argentina	0	3	4	7
7	Ecuador	0	2	1	3
8	Colombia	0	1	3	4
9	Canada	0	1	2	3
10	Puerto Rico	0	0	2	2
11	El Salvador	0	0	1	1
11	Haiti	0	0	1	1
11	Mexico	0	0	1	1
11	Uruguay	0	0	1	1
Totals (14 entries)		18	18	34	70
