= Paula Pareto =

Argentine judoka and physician

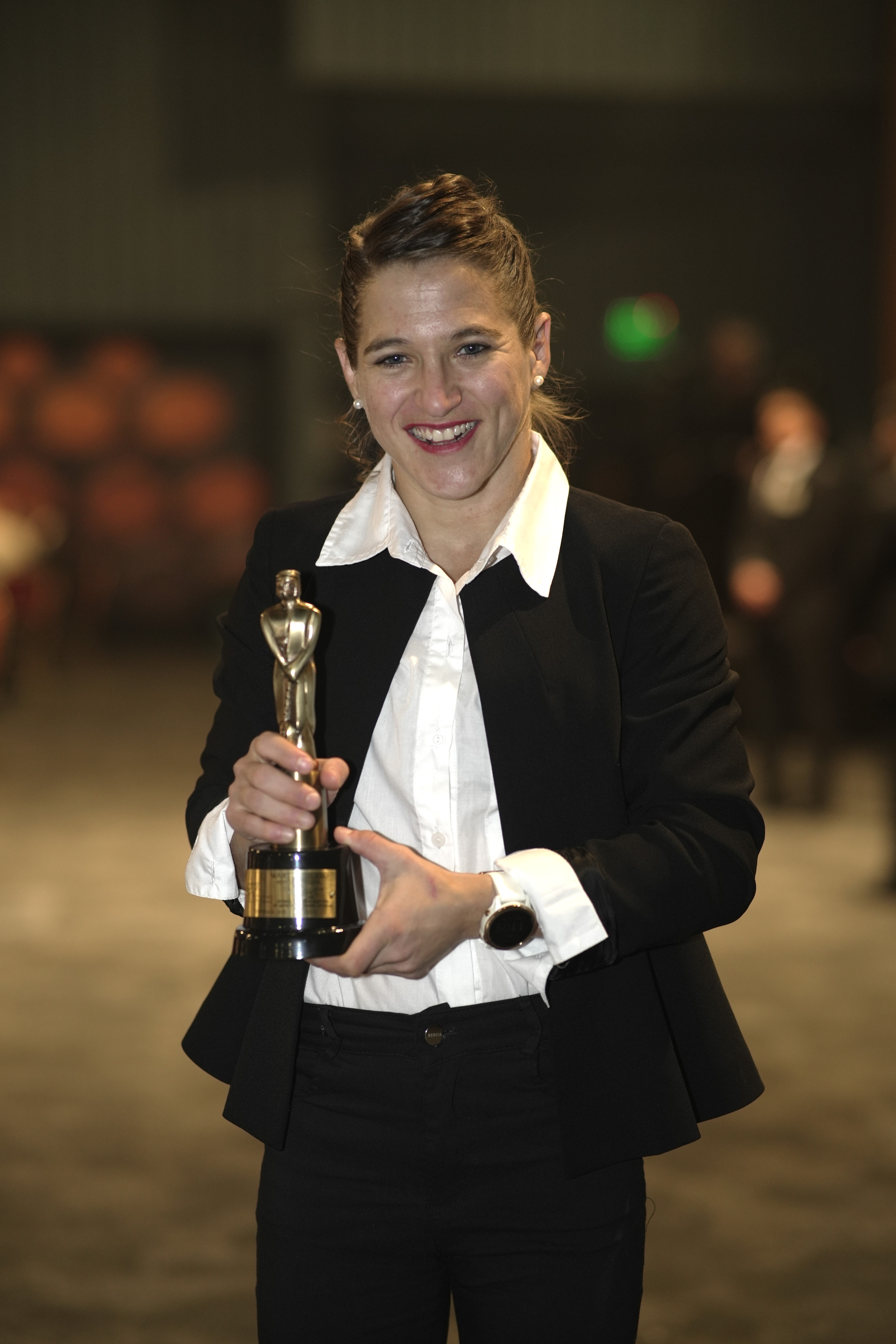
- Pareto in 2024

Personal information
- Full name: Paula Belén Pareto
- Nickname: La Peque
- Born: 16 January 1986 (age 40) San Fernando, Argentina
- Occupation: Judoka
- Height: 148 cm (4 ft 10 in)

Sport
- Country: Argentina
- Sport: Judo
- Weight class: –48 kg
- Club: Estudiantes, La Plata
- Retired: 16 September 2021

Achievements and titles
- Olympic Games: (gold) (2016)
- World Champ.: (2015)
- Pan American Champ.: (2009, 2011, 2017, 2018, 2019, 2020)
Medal record
Women's judo
Representing Argentina
Olympic Games
Gold medal – first place	2016 Rio de Janeiro	‍–‍48 kg
Bronze medal – third place	2008 Beijing	‍–‍48 kg
World Championships
Gold medal – first place	2015 Astana	‍–‍48 kg
Silver medal – second place	2014 Chelyabinsk	‍–‍48 kg
Bronze medal – third place	2018 Baku	‍–‍48 kg
Pan American Games
Gold medal – first place	2011 Guadalajara	‍–‍48 kg
Silver medal – second place	2015 Toronto	‍–‍48 kg
Bronze medal – third place	2007 Rio de Janeiro	‍–‍48 kg
Pan American Championships
Gold medal – first place	2009 Buenos Aires	‍–‍48 kg
Gold medal – first place	2011 Guadalajara	‍–‍48 kg
Gold medal – first place	2017 Panama City	‍–‍48 kg
Gold medal – first place	2018 San José	‍–‍48 kg
Gold medal – first place	2019 Lima	‍–‍48 kg
Gold medal – first place	2020 Guadalajara	‍–‍48 kg
Silver medal – second place	2005 Caguas (PUR)	‍–‍44 kg
Silver medal – second place	2015 Edmonton	‍–‍48 kg
Silver medal – second place	2016 Havana	‍–‍48 kg
Bronze medal – third place	2008 Miami	‍–‍48 kg
Bronze medal – third place	2010 San Salvador	‍–‍48 kg
Bronze medal – third place	2013 San José	‍–‍48 kg
Bronze medal – third place	2014 Guayaquil	‍–‍48 kg
World Masters
Silver medal – second place	2015 Rabat	‍–‍48 kg
IJF Grand Slam
Gold medal – first place	2012 Rio de Janeiro	‍–‍48 kg
Gold medal – first place	2019 Ekaterinburg	‍–‍48 kg
Silver medal – second place	2018 Ekaterinburg	‍–‍48 kg
Silver medal – second place	2020 Budapest	‍–‍48 kg
Bronze medal – third place	2009 Rio de Janeiro	‍–‍48 kg
Bronze medal – third place	2014 Paris	‍–‍48 kg
Bronze medal – third place	2014 Tokyo	‍–‍48 kg
Bronze medal – third place	2017 Abu Dhabi	‍–‍48 kg
Bronze medal – third place	2018 Abu Dhabi	‍–‍48 kg
IJF Grand Prix
Gold medal – first place	2015 Samsun	‍–‍48 kg
Gold medal – first place	2015 Budapest	‍–‍48 kg
Gold medal – first place	2018 Cancún	‍–‍48 kg
Silver medal – second place	2014 Qingdao	‍–‍48 kg
Bronze medal – third place	2010 Düsseldorf	‍–‍48 kg
Bronze medal – third place	2013 Miami	‍–‍48 kg
Bronze medal – third place	2016 Havana	‍–‍48 kg
Bronze medal – third place	2017 Zagreb	‍–‍48 kg
Bronze medal – third place	2019 Montreal	‍–‍48 kg
South American Games
Gold medal – first place	2010 Medellin	‍–‍48 kg
Gold medal – first place	2014 Santiago	‍–‍48 kg
Silver medal – second place	2006 Buenos Aires	‍–‍48 kg
South American Junior Championships
Gold medal – first place	2003 Buenos Aires	‍–‍44 kg
Silver medal – second place	2004 Buenos Aires	‍–‍44 kg

Profile at external databases
- IJF: 568
- JudoInside.com: 35243
- Updated on 23 May 2023

Paula Belén Pareto (born 16 January 1986) is an Argentine retired judoka and physician. She was the flag bearer for her country at the 2016 Summer Olympics closing ceremony held in Rio de Janeiro, Brazil. She competed at the 2020 Summer Olympics. She was the first Argentinian woman to become Olympic Champion having won gold at the women's 48 kg event at the 2016 Summer Olympics.

== Biography ==
Paula, nicknamed "La Peque" (The small one), was born in San Fernando, Argentina. She lives with her parents in Tigre, close to the capital city. She began swimming at the age of four, and a year later, she took up gymnastics. Her inspiration for judo arose when she was 9, and her younger brother Marco came home from school beaten up. Her father, Aldo, used to practice judo when he was young, so he decided to send Marco to a judo club. Paula was curious and wanted to go too.

Her first judo club was Club San Fernando. She soon won her first tournament, and when she decided to continue practicing judo, she moved to bigger Club Estudiantes de La Plata. First years she competed in the −44 kg division but later moved up to the −48 kg category.

She is a big football fan and plays football with her friends. She had a period when she wanted to play football professionally, but she left the idea to pursue her judo career after that. Her favorite club is Boca Juniors and her home club Estudiantes de La Plata.

During the 2008 Summer Olympics in Beijing, in an interview said that she is single, and her mother Mirta commented that it was like "You are engaged to judo".

Paula has a younger brother named Marco, who supports her on her journeys around world tournaments, and an older sister named Estefanía, who is a psychologist.

She studied medicine at the University of Buenos Aires and graduated in March 2014.

In November 2010, Paula was granted the Platinum Konex Award as Argentina's best sportswoman of the last decade. In December 2015, she received the Gold Olimpia Award as the best athlete of the year from her country.

In 2024, Pareto became a member of the International Olympic Committee.

== Judo ==
Pareto won the bronze medal at the 2008 Summer Olympics in one of the most dramatic matches of the tournament. She stood against Pak Ok-song from North Korea, Pak was active the whole match and earned a koka for her activity. The drama unfolded in the last 10 seconds when Pak initiated a technique, but Pareto countered with her own move, a Kuchiki taoshi. Problems arose when the jury counted the technique for Pak, perhaps because she began to move first. In the end, Pak celebrated the medal, and Pareto cried, but her trainer Carlos Denegri lodged an objection, so the jury checked the video. Finally, they agreed that it was Pareto who made the technique (Kuchiki taoshi), and so she took the medal.

Pareto is also very successful in continental games and championships like Pan American Games.

Pareto won the gold medal at the 2015 World Championships in August in Astana, Kazakhstan, her first world title. At the 2016 Summer Olympics, Pareto defeated Jeong Bo-kyeong to capture an Olympic gold medal.

== Achievements ==
Year	Tournament	Place	Weight class
2005	Pan American Judo Championships	2nd	Super Extra-Lightweight (−44 kg)
2006	Pan American Judo Championships	5th	Extra-Lightweight (−48 kg)
2006	South American Games	2nd	Extra-Lightweight (−48 kg)
2007	Pan American Judo Championships	5th	Extra-Lightweight (−48 kg)
2007	World Judo Championships	5th	Extra-Lightweight (−48 kg)
2007	Pan American Games	3rd	Extra-Lightweight (−48 kg)
2008	Pan American Judo Championships	3rd	Extra-Lightweight (−48 kg)
2008	Olympic Games	3rd	Extra-Lightweight (−48 kg)
2009	Pan American Judo Championships	1st	Extra-Lightweight (−48 kg)
2010	South American Games	1st	Extra-Lightweight (−48 kg)
2010	Pan American Judo Championships	3rd	Extra-Lightweight (−48 kg)
2011	Pan American Judo Championships	1st	Extra-Lightweight (−48 kg)
2011	Pan American Games	1st	Extra-Lightweight (−48 kg)
2012	Olympic Games	5th	Extra-Lightweight (−48 kg)
2013	Pan American Judo Championships	3rd	Extra-Lightweight (−48 kg)
2014	South American Games	1st	Extra-Lightweight (−48 kg)
2014	World Judo Championships	2nd	Extra-Lightweight (−48 kg)
2014	Pan American Judo Championships	3rd	Extra-Lightweight (−48 kg)
2015	Pan American Judo Championships	2nd	Extra-Lightweight (−48 kg)
2015	Pan American Games	2nd	Extra-Lightweight (−48 kg)
2015	World Judo Championships	1st	Extra-Lightweight (−48 kg)
2016	Pan American Judo Championships	2nd	Extra-Lightweight (−48 kg)
2016	Olympic Games	1st	Extra-Lightweight (−48 kg)
2017	Pan American Judo Championships	1st	Extra-Lightweight (−48 kg)
2018	Pan American Judo Championships	1st	Extra-Lightweight (−48 kg)
2018	World Judo Championships	3rd	Extra-Lightweight (−48 kg)
