= Saraí Mendoza =

Salvadorian judoka (born 1977)

Personal information
- Born: 14 September 1977 (age 48) Cuscatlán, El Salvador

Sport
- Sport: Judo
Medal record
Representing El Salvador
Pan American Judo Championships
Bronze medal – third place	2009 Buenos Aires	70 kg
Bronze medal – third place	2010 San Salvador	70 kg
Central American and Caribbean Games
Bronze medal – third place	2006 Cartagena	-70 kg

Verónica Saraí Mendoza Lara (born September 14, 1977) is a judoka from El Salvador.

== Career ==
Mendoza won the bronze medal of the under 70 kg division of the 2006 Central American and Caribbean Games.

She competed at 2007 Pan American Games in Rio de Janeiro where she lost in prelims with Mayra Aguiar who won silver medal.

Mendoza won bronze medal at the 2009, 2010 Pan American Judo Championships.

== Achievements ==
Year	Tournament	Place	Weight class
2004	Pan American Judo Championships	5th	Middleweight (- 70 kg)
2004	Pan American Judo Championships	3rd	Openweight
2005	Pan American Judo Championships	5th	Middleweight (- 70 kg)
2005	Pan American Judo Championships	5th	Openweight
2006	Pan American Judo Championships	5th	Middleweight (- 70 kg)
2007	Pan American Games	9th	Middleweight (- 70 kg)
2009	Pan American Judo Championships	3rd	Middleweight (- 70 kg)
2010	Pan American Judo Championships	3rd	Middleweight (- 70 kg)
2010	Pan American Judo Championships	5th	Openweight
