= Judo at the 2006 Central American and Caribbean Games =

Judo competition

- Venue: Coliseo de Gimnasia y Deportes de Combate and Unidad Deportiva Pedro de Heredia
- Location: Cartagena
- Dates: 20–23 November

The Judo competition at the 2006 Central American and Caribbean Games was held in Cartagena, Colombia. The tournament was scheduled to be held from 25 to 29 July at the Coliseo de Gimnasia y Deportes de Combate, Unidad Deportiva Pedro de Heredia in Cartagena. This was the first time that the regional games held the Kata division.

== Medal summary ==
=== Men's events ===
Event	Gold	Silver	Bronze
−55 kg	Robert Gomez (DOM)	Jorge Morales (CUB)	Roberto Paz (ESA); Leoncio Torres (MEX)
−60 kg	Javier Guédez (VEN)	Ángelo Gómez (CUB)	Modesto Lara (DOM); Juan Román (PUR)
−66 kg	Yordanis Arencibia (CUB)	Juan Jacinto (DOM)	Armando Ortíz (MEX); Ludwig Ortiz (VEN)
−73 kg	Ronald Girones (CUB)	Marcos Figueredo (DOM)	Richard León (VEN); Jairo Vargas (COL)
−81 kg	Oscar Cárdenas (CUB)	Jean Tibert (HAI)	Francisco Cisneros (ESA); Abderraman Brenes (PUR)
−90 kg	Jorge Benavides (CUB)	Jose Camacho (VEN)	Alexis Chiclana (PUR); Julian Gutiérrez (MEX)
−100 kg	Oreidis Despaigne (CUB)	Teófilo Diek (DOM)	Hugo Cepeda (MEX); Daniel Insua (VEN)
+100 kg	Óscar Brayson (CUB)	Luis Morán (HON)	Leonel Ruiz (VEN); Joel Brutus (HAI)
Open	Óscar Brayson (CUB)	Joel Brutus (HAI)	José Camacho (VEN); Félix Lebrón (DOM)
Kata	Colombia (Glatenferd Escobar, Luis Montes)	Dominican Republic (Wilkin Ogando, Orlando Cruz)	Cuba (Ismael Borboña, Johanny Columbié); Venezuela (Chi Meing Leung, Ludwing Ortíz)
Team	Cuba (Yordanis Arencibia, Oscar Cárdenas, Jorge Benavides, Oreidis Despaigne, Tenochtitlán Cárdenas)	Mexico (Armando Ortíz, Víctor Palafox, Julián Gutiérrez, Hugo Cepeda, Claudio Zupo)	Dominican Republic (Juan Jacinto, Franlin Pérez, Amado Santos, Teófilo Diek, José Vasquez); Venezuela (José Camacho, Ludwing Ortiz, Yeimer López, Daniel Insua, Leonel Ruiz)

=== Women's events ===
Event	Gold	Silver	Bronze
−44 kg	Dayaris Mestre (CUB)	Milagros González (VEN)	Evelin Rodríguez (GUA); Luz Álvarez (COL)
−48 kg	Yanet Bermoy (CUB)	Lisseth Orozco (COL)	Silvia Arteaga (VEN); Zuleyma García (ESA)
−52 kg	Neila Melo (COL)	María García (DOM)	Flor Velásquez (VEN); Edilia Amorós (CUB)
−57 kg	Yurisleydis Lupetey (CUB)	Ange Jean (HAI)	Diglimar Aguillón (VEN); Yuri Alvear (COL)
−63 kg	Driulis González (CUB)	Jessica García (PUR)	Yadinis Amarís (COL); Audrey Puello (DOM)
−70 kg	Yalegni Castillo (CUB)	Ysis Barreto (VEN)	Verónica Mendoza (ESA); Roxana García (PUR)
−78 kg	Yurisel Laborde (CUB)	Ana Carrillo (MEX)	Keivi Pinto (VEN); Mirla Nolberto (GUA)
+78 kg	Ivis Dueñas (CUB)	Giovanna Blanco (VEN)	Vanessa Zambotti (MEX); Melissa Mojica (PUR)
Open	Giovanna Blanco (VEN)	Rosalín Bermúdez (CUB)	Mabel Henríquez (DOM); Melissa Mojica (PUR)
Kata	Venezuela (Yeraldit Fernández, Flor Velásquez)	Colombia (Margarita Castaño, Liliana Ibarra	Cuba (Blanca Crespo, Norelis Gavilán); Mexico (Miriam Ruiz, Elsa Fernández)
Team	Cuba (Yanet Bermoy, Driulis González, Yalegni Castillo, Yurisel Laborde, Ivis Dueñas)	Dominican Republic (María García, Audrey Puello, Yermi Olivo, Leydi Germán, Mabel Henríquez)	Venezuela (Flor Velásquez, Mayerling Barreto, Ysis Barreto, Keivi Pinto, Giovanna Blanco); Colombia (Lisseth Orozco, Neila Melo, Yadinis Amarís, Yuri Alvear, Anny Cortés)
