= 2007 Pan American Judo Championships =

Judo competition

2007 Judo Pan American Judo Championships
- Venue: Centre Pierre Charbonneau
- Location: Montreal, Canada
- Dates: 24–27 May 2007

Competition at external databases
- Links: JudoInside

The 32nd Pan American Judo Championships were held in Centre Pierre Charbonneau in Montreal, Canada from 24 May to 27 May 2007.

== Medal overview ==
=== Men's events ===
Event	Gold	Silver	Bronze
55 kg	Sergio Poll (VEN)	Jairo Futtinico (COL)	Dagoberto Botello (DOM)
55 kg	Sergio Poll (VEN)	Jairo Futtinico (COL)	Kyle Taketa (USA)
60 kg	Frazer Will (CAN)	Denílson Lourenço (BRA)	Miguel Albarracín (ARG)
60 kg	Frazer Will (CAN)	Denílson Lourenço (BRA)	Javier Guédez (VEN)
66 kg	Yordanis Arencibia (CUB)	Leandro Cunha (BRA)	Sasha Mehmedovic (CAN)
66 kg	Yordanis Arencibia (CUB)	Leandro Cunha (BRA)	Ludwig Ortiz (VEN)
73 kg	Ryan Raser (USA)	Pedro Guedes (BRA)	Nicholas Tritton (CAN)
73 kg	Ryan Raser (USA)	Pedro Guedes (BRA)	Ronald Girones (CUB)
81 kg	Oscar Cardenas (CUB)	Emmanuel Lucenti (ARG)	Mario Valles (COL)
81 kg	Oscar Cardenas (CUB)	Emmanuel Lucenti (ARG)	Aaron Cohen (USA)
90 kg	Tiago Camilo (BRA)	José Camacho (VEN)	Jorge Benavide (CUB)
90 kg	Tiago Camilo (BRA)	José Camacho (VEN)	Garry St. Leger (USA)
100 kg	Oreidis Despaigne (CUB)	Leonardo Leite (BRA)	Teofilo Diek (DOM)
100 kg	Oreidis Despaigne (CUB)	Leonardo Leite (BRA)	Keith Morgan (CAN)
+ 100 kg	Daniel Hernandes (BRA)	Óscar Brayson (CUB)	Kirk Hoffmann (USA)
+ 100 kg	Daniel Hernandes (BRA)	Óscar Brayson (CUB)	Joel Brutus (HAI)
Openweight	Carlos Honorato (BRA)	Óscar Brayson (CUB)	Franklin Pérez (DOM)
Openweight	Carlos Honorato (BRA)	Óscar Brayson (CUB)	Adler Volmer (USA)

=== Women's events ===
Event	Gold	Silver	Bronze
44 kg	Maria Velázquez (VEN)	Alexa Liddie (USA)	Andrea Madgett (CAN)
44 kg	Maria Velázquez (VEN)	Alexa Liddie (USA)	vacant
48 kg	Yanet Bermoy (CUB)	Daniela Polzin (BRA)	Lisseth Orozco (COL)
48 kg	Yanet Bermoy (CUB)	Daniela Polzin (BRA)	Glenda Miranda (ECU)
52 kg	Sheila Espinosa (CUB)	María García (DOM)	Flor Velázquez (VEN)
52 kg	Sheila Espinosa (CUB)	María García (DOM)	Érika Miranda (BRA)
57 kg	Valerie Gotay (USA)	Danielle Zangrando (BRA)	Yadinis Amarís (COL)
57 kg	Valerie Gotay (USA)	Danielle Zangrando (BRA)	Yagnelis Mestre (CUB)
63 kg	Driulys González (CUB)	Daniela Krukower (ARG)	Ysis Barreto (VEN)
63 kg	Driulys González (CUB)	Daniela Krukower (ARG)	Jessica García (PUR)
70 kg	Yuri Alvear (COL)	Mayra Aguiar (BRA)	Onix Cortés (CUB)
70 kg	Yuri Alvear (COL)	Mayra Aguiar (BRA)	Ronda Rousey (USA)
78 kg	Edinanci Silva (BRA)	Yurisel Laborde (CUB)	Anny Cortez (COL)
78 kg	Edinanci Silva (BRA)	Yurisel Laborde (CUB)	Marylise Lévesque (CAN)
+ 78 kg	Ibis Dueñas (CUB)	Melissa Mojica (PUR)	Carmen Chalá (ECU)
+ 78 kg	Ibis Dueñas (CUB)	Melissa Mojica (PUR)	Vanessa Zambotti (MEX)
Openweight	Idalys Ortiz (CUB)	Priscilla Marques (BRA)	Heidi Moore (USA)
Openweight	Idalys Ortiz (CUB)	Priscilla Marques (BRA)	Amy Cotton (CAN)

== Medals table ==
Rank	Nation	Gold	Silver	Bronze	Total
1	Cuba	8	3	4	15
2	Brazil	4	8	1	13
3	United States	2	1	7	10
4	Venezuela	2	1	4	7
5	Colombia	1	1	4	6
6	Canada	1	0	6	7
7	Argentina	0	2	1	3
8	Dominican Republic	0	1	3	4
9	Puerto Rico	0	1	1	2
10	Ecuador	0	0	2	2
11	Haiti	0	0	1	1
11	Mexico	0	0	1	1
Totals (12 entries)		18	18	35	71
