= Judo at the 2006 South American Games =

Judo competition

At the 2006 South American Games 18 judo events were held, 9 in both genders. The first eight events were held on 9 November, while to others took place on 10 November.

== Men's results ==
Weight	Gold	Silver	Bronze
– 55 kg	(Brazil) Thiago Aoki	(Colombia) Jaime Jaramillo	(Argentina) Diego Rodríguez (Ecuador) Carlos Tenesaca
– 60 kg	(Argentina) Miguel Albarracín	(Venezuela) Javier Guédez	(Brazil) Daniel Aquino (Peru) Juan Miguel Postigos Acuña
– 66 kg	(Ecuador) Roberto Ibañez	(Brazil) Vitor Ferraz	(Chile) Felipe Novoa (Venezuela) Ludwig Ortíz
– 73 kg	(Argentina) Daniel Lucenti	(Chile) Eduardo Novoa Cianelli	(Brazil) Diogo Coutinho (Venezuela) Richard Leon
– 81 kg	(Argentina) Emmanuel Lucenti	(Colombia) Mario Valles	(Chile) Francisco Ayala (Venezuela) Yemer Lopez
– 90 kg	(Argentina) Diego Rosati	(Chile) Guillermo Urriola	(Brazil) Alexsander Jose Guedes (Venezuela) José Camacho
– 100 kg	(Brazil) Luciano Ribeiro Correa	(Argentina) Alejandro Elissi	(Venezuela) Albeny Rosales
+ 100 kg	(Brazil) Walter Costa Dos Santos	(Peru) Carlos Zegarra	(Colombia) Luis Ignacio Salazar Carvajal (Argentina) Ruben Walesberg
Open class	(Colombia) Luis Ignacio Salazar Carvajal	(Venezuela) Albeny Rosales	(Brazil) Walter Costa Dos Santos (Peru) Carlos Zegarra

== Women's results ==
Weight	Gold	Silver	Bronze
– 44 kg	(Venezuela) María Velásquez	(Ecuador) Diana Cobos Morales	(Chile) Antonia Galleguillos (Colombia) Luz Alvarez
– 48 kg	(Colombia) Lisseth Orozco	(Argentina) Paula Pareto	(Brazil) Sarah Menezes (Venezuela) Rosmelin Rodriguez
– 52 kg	(Colombia) Neyla Melo	(Brazil) Andressa Fernandes	(Ecuador) Cristina Ortega (Venezuela) Flor Velázquez
– 57 kg	(Colombia) Yadinis Amaris	(Ecuador) Diana Villavicencio	(Argentina) Ana Laura Campos (Brazil) Paula Souza Rodrigues
– 63 kg	(Argentina) Daniela Krukower	(Brazil) Lilian Lenzi	(Uruguay) Irene Figoli Diaz (Colombia) Yuri Alvear
– 70 kg	(Brazil) Marcia Lima	(Ecuador) Diana Chalá	(Venezuela) Maria Rojas
– 78 kg	(Colombia) Anny Cortés	(Brazil) Claudirene Cezar	(Argentina) Lorena Briceño
+ 78 kg	(Brazil) Priscila Almeida	(Venezuela) Giovanna Blanco	(Argentina) Jesica Briceño (Ecuador) Carmen Chalá
Open class	(Venezuela) Giovanna Blanco	(Ecuador) Carmen Chalá	(Brazil) Aline Barbosa

== Medal count ==
Judo at the 2006 South American Games Medal Count
Rank	Nation	Gold	Silver	Bronze	Total
1	Brazil	5	4	7	16
2	Argentina	5	2	5	12
3	Colombia	5	2	3	10
4	Ecuador	1	4	3	8
5	Venezuela	2	3	8	13
6	Chile	0	2	3	5
7	Peru	0	1	2	3
8	Uruguay	0	0	1	1
Total		18	18	31	67
