= Flávio Canto =

British-born Brazilian judoka (born 1975)

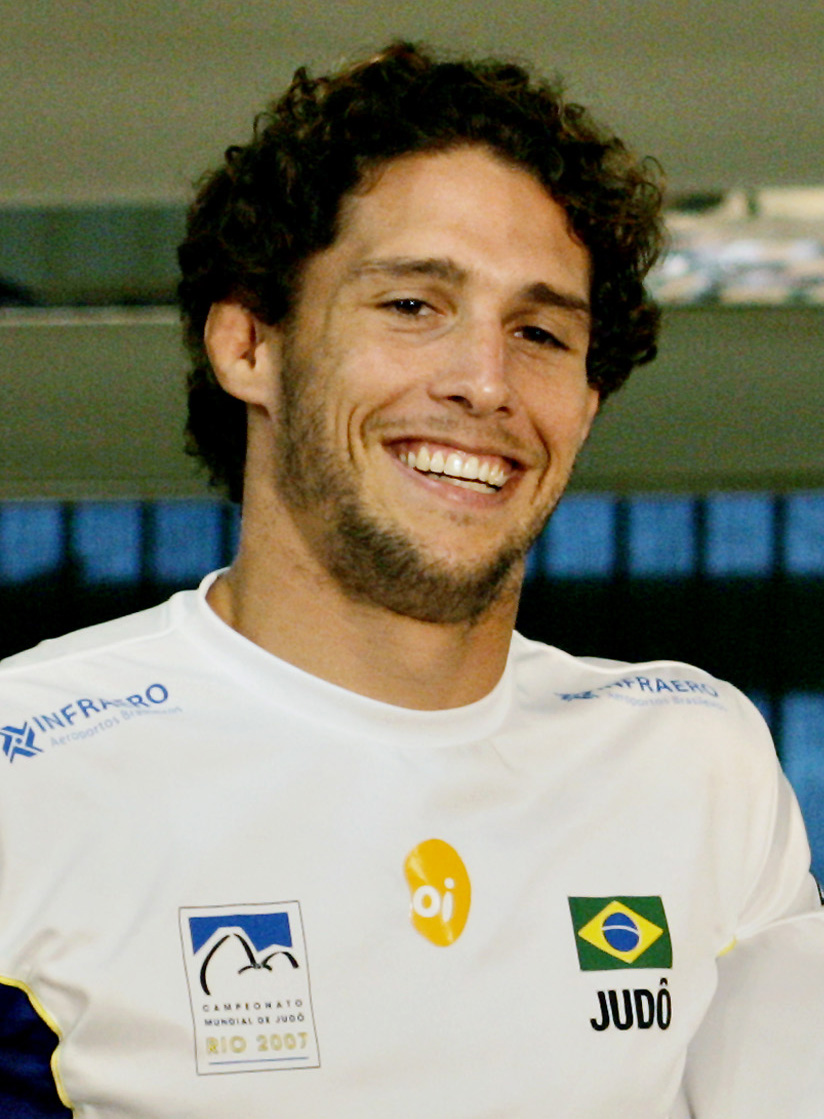

Personal information
- Full name: Flávio Vianna de Ulhôa Canto
- Citizenship: United Kingdom; Brazil
- Born: 16 April 1975 (age 51) Oxford, England
- Occupation: Judoka
- Website: flaviocanto.com

Sport
- Country: Brazil
- Sport: Judo
- Weight class: –81 kg

Achievements and titles
- Olympic Games: (bronze) (2004)
- World Champ.: 5th (2010)
- Pan American Champ.: (gold) (1997, 1999, 2003, 2004, 2006, 2010)
Medal record
Men's judo
Representing Brazil
Olympic Games
Bronze medal – third place	2004 Athens	‍–‍81 kg
Pan American Games
Gold medal – first place	2003 Santo Domingo	‍–‍81 kg
Silver medal – second place	1999 Winnipeg	‍–‍81 kg
Bronze medal – third place	1995 Mara del Plata	‍–‍78 kg
Pan American Championships
Gold medal – first place	1997 Guadalajara	‍–‍78 kg
Gold medal – first place	1999 Montevideo	‍–‍81 kg
Gold medal – first place	2003 Salvador	‍–‍81 kg
Gold medal – first place	2004 Isla Margarita	‍–‍81 kg
Gold medal – first place	2006 Buenos Aires	‍–‍81 kg
Gold medal – first place	2010 San Salvador	‍–‍81 kg
Silver medal – second place	2009 Buenos Aires	‍–‍81 kg
Bronze medal – third place	1996 San Juan	‍–‍78 kg
Bronze medal – third place	1998 Santo Domingo	‍–‍81 kg
Bronze medal – third place	2002 Santo Domingo	‍–‍81 kg
IJF Grand Slam
Bronze medal – third place	2010 Rio de Janeiro	‍–‍81 kg
Bronze medal – third place	2010 Moscow	‍–‍81 kg
South American Games
Gold medal – first place	2002 Rio de Janeiro	‍–‍81 kg

Profile at external databases
- IJF: 2074
- JudoInside.com: 676
- Updated on 30 May 2023

Flávio Vianna de Ulhôa Canto (born 16 April 1975, in Oxford, England) is a Brazilian judoka who competed in Men's 81 kg Judo. He won the bronze medal at the 2004 Summer Olympics. He is the founder and president of the Instituto Reação, and also presenter of the TV shows Corujão do Esporte on TV Globo and Sensei on SporTV.

== Biography ==
Flavio Canto was born in Oxford, England, where his father had a doctorate in nuclear physics. At two years old he came to Brazil and started Judo at fourteen. Despite starting Judo at a relatively advanced age, he was still able to compete at the national level in only five years. He is also a 6th degree black belt in Brazilian jiu-jitsu. He married actress and presenter Fiorella Mattheis in 2013. They divorced in 2014.

== Judo career ==
Flávio Canto was selected in national team for the first time in 1995 when he won the bronze medal at the 1995 Pan American Games in Mar del Plata. In 1996 he got the 7th place at the Olympics in Atlanta and in 1999 was silver medalist in the 1999 Pan American Games in Winnipeg. He lost the qualifiers for the 2000 Sydney Olympic Games to Tiago Camilo, won the gold medal at the 2003 Pan American Games, and then defeated Camilo to fight in the 2004 Athens Olympics, where Canto got the Olympic bronze medal. In the 2007 Pan American Games, Canto wound up out of the podium after injuring his elbow in the semifinal. He was World Ranking Leader U81kg in 2010, and retired from competition in 2012.

== Instituto Reação social project ==
In 2003 Flávio Canto created Instituto Reação, a non-governmental organization that promotes human development and social inclusion through sports and education, promoting judo from the sport initiation to a level of high performance. Instituto Reação works in low-income communities in Rio de Janeiro including Rocinha, Pequena Cruzada, Cidade de Deus and Tubiacanga. The Institute serves about 1,000 children and young people between 4 and 25 years old and has played a prominent role in competitions, including having helped train the current Olympic and world junior judo champion, Rafaela Lopes Silva.
