= Yuri Alvear =

Colombian judoka (born 1986)

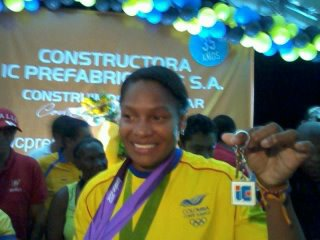

Personal information
- Full name: Yuri Alvear Orejuela
- Nationality: Colombian
- Born: 29 March 1986 (age 40) Jamundí, Colombia
- Occupation: Judoka
- Height: 1.74 m (5 ft 9 in)

Sport
- Country: Colombia
- Sport: Judo
- Weight class: –70 kg

Achievements and titles
- Olympic Games: (silver) (2016)
- World Champ.: (2009, 2013, 2014)
- Pan American Champ.: (2007, 2009, 2014, 2016, 2017, 2018)
Medal record
Women's judo
Representing Colombia
Olympic Games
Silver medal – second place	2016 Rio de Janeiro	‍–‍70 kg
Bronze medal – third place	2012 London	‍–‍70 kg
World Championships
Gold medal – first place	2009 Rotterdam	‍–‍70 kg
Gold medal – first place	2013 Rio de Janeiro	‍–‍70 kg
Gold medal – first place	2014 Chelyabinsk	‍–‍70 kg
Bronze medal – third place	2015 Astana	‍–‍70 kg
Bronze medal – third place	2017 Budapest	‍–‍70 kg
Bronze medal – third place	2018 Baku	‍–‍70 kg
Pan American Games
Silver medal – second place	2011 Guadalajara	‍–‍70 kg
Silver medal – second place	2019 Lima	‍–‍70 kg
Bronze medal – third place	2007 Rio de Janeiro	‍–‍70 kg
Bronze medal – third place	2015 Toronto	‍–‍70 kg
Pan American Championships
Gold medal – first place	2007 Montreal	‍–‍70 kg
Gold medal – first place	2009 Buenos Aires	‍–‍70 kg
Gold medal – first place	2014 Guayaquil	‍–‍70 kg
Gold medal – first place	2016 Havana	‍–‍70 kg
Gold medal – first place	2017 Panama City	‍–‍70 kg
Gold medal – first place	2018 San José	‍–‍70 kg
Silver medal – second place	2015 Edmonton	‍–‍70 kg
Bronze medal – third place	2008 Miami	‍–‍70 kg
Bronze medal – third place	2011 Guadalajara	‍–‍70 kg
Bronze medal – third place	2012 Montreal	‍–‍70 kg
Bronze medal – third place	2013 San José	‍–‍70 kg
World Masters
Silver medal – second place	2015 Rabat	‍–‍70 kg
Silver medal – second place	2018 Guangzhou	‍–‍70 kg
Bronze medal – third place	2016 Guadalajara	‍–‍70 kg
IJF Grand Slam
Gold medal – first place	2017 Baku	‍–‍70 kg
Gold medal – first place	2019 Brasilia	‍–‍70 kg
Silver medal – second place	2011 Rio de Janeiro	‍–‍70 kg
Bronze medal – third place	2009 Rio de Janeiro	‍–‍70 kg
Bronze medal – third place	2013 Tokyo	‍–‍70 kg
IJF Grand Prix
Silver medal – second place	2015 Samsun	‍–‍70 kg
Bronze medal – third place	2011 Düsseldorf	‍–‍70 kg
Bronze medal – third place	2011 Amsterdam	‍–‍70 kg
Bronze medal – third place	2016 Düsseldorf	‍–‍70 kg
South American Games
Gold medal – first place	2010 Medellín	‍–‍70 kg
Gold medal – first place	2010 Medellín	Women's team
Gold medal – first place	2014 Santiago	‍–‍70 kg
Gold medal – first place	2018 Cochabamba	‍–‍70 kg
Bronze medal – third place	2006 Buenos Aires	‍–‍63 kg

Profile at external databases
- IJF: 63421
- JudoInside.com: 43732
- Updated on 23 May 2023

Yuri Alvear Orejuela (born 29 March 1986) is a Colombian judoka, three times World Champion in her division.

== Early life ==
Yuri was born in Jamundí which is a suburb of Cali, the third largest city in Colombia. Her father Arnuy is a builder and mother Miryam is a housewife. She also has a brother, Harvy.

In her youth she competed in water polo, volleyball, handball, athletics. When she was 14 she met Ruperto Guaúña, a judo trainer of Litecom school, who was looking for girls for his judo team. This led to Yuri becoming a judoka.

Yuri began judo late, but she already was already in good physical condition from previous sport so she just needed to learn technical aspects of judo.

She is a close friend with other top Colombian judoka Anny Cortez and sparring partner.

== Judo career ==
Alvear won a bronze medal in the under 57 kg division of the 2006 Central American and Caribbean Games.

In 2008, she participated in the Olympic Games in Beijing where she placed 7th. She lost to Anaysi Hernández of Cuba in the main draw and then lost a very close match against Leire Iglesias from Spain in the repechage losing her chance to fight for a medal.

In 2009, she won the World Championships in Rotterdam. In the final she gained victory over Anett Mészáros from Hungary and became the third South American judoka to win the title, following Natasha Hernández (of Venezuela) in 1984 and Daniela Krukower (of Argentina) in 2003.

Two weeks before the 2010 Pan American Judo Championships, after training she felt some pain in her left knee. She went to doctor and he found that she had a torn ACL.

In 2012, she won a bronze medal at the Olympic Games in London, beating Chen Fei of China. This was the first ever Olympic medal for Colombia in Judo.

In 2016, she returned to the Olympic games in Rio and won a silver medal, becoming the 5th Colombian athlete to win two Olympic medals.

== Achievements ==
Year	Tournament	Place	Weight class
2007	Pan American Judo Championships	1st	Middleweight (−70 kg)
2008	Pan American Judo Championships	3rd	Middleweight (−70 kg)
2008	Olympic Games	7th	Middleweight (−70 kg)
2009	Pan American Judo Championships	1st	Middleweight (−70 kg)
2009	World Judo Championships	1st	Middleweight (−70 kg)
2010	South American Games	1st	Middleweight (−70 kg)
2011	Pan American Judo Championships	3rd	Middleweight (−70 kg)
2012	Olympic Games	3rd	Middleweight (−70 kg)
2014	World Judo Championships	1st	Middleweight (−70 kg)
2015	World Judo Championships	3rd	Middleweight (−70 kg)
2016	Olympic Games	2nd	Middleweight (−70 kg)

All results referenced in her JudoInside profile.

Olympic Games
Preceded by Mariana Pajón	Flagbearer for Colombia; Rio de Janeiro 2016	Succeeded by Pedro Causil
