= 2008 Pan American Judo Championships =

Judo competition

2008 Judo Pan American Judo Championships
- Venue: Miami
- Location: Miami, United States of America
- Dates: 8–9 May 2008

Competition at external databases
- Links: JudoInside

The 32nd Pan American Judo Championships were held in Miami, United States from 8–9 May 2008.

== Medal overview ==
=== Men's events ===
| Event | Gold | Silver | Bronze |
|---|---|---|---|
| 55 kg | Hiram Cruz (PUR) | Julien Paradis (CAN) | Martin Bustamante (ARG) |
| 55 kg | Hiram Cruz (PUR) | Julien Paradis (CAN) | Jefryd Garcia (NCA) |
| 60 kg | Javier Guédez (VEN) | Miguel Albarracín (ARG) | Yosmani Piker (CUB) |
| 60 kg | Javier Guédez (VEN) | Miguel Albarracín (ARG) | Taraje Williams-Murray (USA) |
| 66 kg | Yordanis Arencibia (CUB) | Roberto Ibáñez (ECU) | Sasha Mehmedovic (CAN) |
| 66 kg | Yordanis Arencibia (CUB) | Roberto Ibáñez (ECU) | Juan Jacinto (DOM) |
| 73 kg | Victor Penalber (BRA) | Ludwig Ortiz (VEN) | Ronald Girones (CUB) |
| 73 kg | Victor Penalber (BRA) | Ludwig Ortiz (VEN) | Nicholas Tritton (CAN) |
| 81 kg | Guilerme Luna (BRA) | Travis Stevens (USA) | Oscar Cardenas (CUB) |
| 81 kg | Guilerme Luna (BRA) | Travis Stevens (USA) | Richard Leon (VEN) |
| 90 kg | Eduardo Santos (BRA) | Diego Rosati (ARG) | Jorge Benavide (CUB) |
| 90 kg | Eduardo Santos (BRA) | Diego Rosati (ARG) | Alexandre Émond (CAN) |
| 100 kg | Keith Morgan (CAN) | Eduardo Costa (ARG) | Leonardo Leite (BRA) |
| 100 kg | Keith Morgan (CAN) | Eduardo Costa (ARG) | Oreidis Despaigne (CUB) |
| + 100 kg | Walter Santos (BRA) | Óscar Brayson (CUB) | Albenis Rosales (VEN) |
| + 100 kg | Walter Santos (BRA) | Óscar Brayson (CUB) | José Eugenio Vásquez (DOM) |
| Openweight | Óscar Brayson (CUB) | Walter Santos (BRA) | Pablo Figueroa (PUR) |
| Openweight | Óscar Brayson (CUB) | Walter Santos (BRA) | Daniel McCormick (USA) |

=== Women's events ===
| Event | Gold | Silver | Bronze |
|---|---|---|---|
| 44 kg | Taylor Ibera (USA) | Shirley Guerrero (COL) | vacant |
| 44 kg | Taylor Ibera (USA) | Shirley Guerrero (COL) | vacant |
| 48 kg | Yanet Bermoy (CUB) | Daniela Polzin (BRA) | Paula Pareto (ARG) |
| 48 kg | Yanet Bermoy (CUB) | Daniela Polzin (BRA) | Glenda Miranda (ECU) |
| 52 kg | Flor Velázquez (VEN) | Érika Miranda (BRA) | Maria Garcia (DOM) |
| 52 kg | Flor Velázquez (VEN) | Érika Miranda (BRA) | Aminata Sall (CAN) |
| 57 kg | Valerie Gotay (USA) | Yadinis Amarís (COL) | Yurisleidy Lupetey (CUB) |
| 57 kg | Valerie Gotay (USA) | Yadinis Amarís (COL) | Ketleyn Quadros (BRA) |
| 63 kg | Driulys González (CUB) | Danielli Yuri (BRA) | Ysis Barreto (VEN) |
| 63 kg | Driulys González (CUB) | Danielli Yuri (BRA) | Daniela Krukower (ARG) |
| 70 kg | Mayra Aguiar (BRA) | Yalennis Castillo (CUB) | Yuri Alvear (COL) |
| 70 kg | Mayra Aguiar (BRA) | Yalennis Castillo (CUB) | Catherine Roberge (CAN) |
| 78 kg | Yurisel Laborde (CUB) | Edinanci Silva (BRA) | Lorena Briceño (ARG) |
| 78 kg | Yurisel Laborde (CUB) | Edinanci Silva (BRA) | Marylise Lévesque (CAN) |
| + 78 kg | Idalys Ortiz (CUB) | Giovanna Blanco (VEN) | Vanessa Zambotti (MEX) |
| + 78 kg | Idalys Ortiz (CUB) | Giovanna Blanco (VEN) | Melissa Mojica (PUR) |
| Openweight | Melissa Mojica (PUR) | Priscilla Marques (BRA) | Mavi Mendoza (MEX) |
| Openweight | Melissa Mojica (PUR) | Priscilla Marques (BRA) | Carmen Chalá (ECU) |

== Medals table ==
| Rank | Nation | Gold | Silver | Bronze | Total |
|---|---|---|---|---|---|
| 1 | Cuba | 6 | 2 | 6 | 14 |
| 2 | Brazil | 5 | 6 | 2 | 13 |
| 3 | Venezuela | 2 | 2 | 3 | 7 |
| 4 | United States | 2 | 1 | 2 | 5 |
| 5 | Puerto Rico | 2 | 0 | 2 | 4 |
| 6 | Canada | 1 | 1 | 6 | 8 |
| 7 | Argentina | 0 | 3 | 4 | 7 |
| 8 | Colombia | 0 | 2 | 1 | 3 |
| 9 | Ecuador | 0 | 1 | 2 | 3 |
| 10 | Dominican Republic | 0 | 0 | 3 | 3 |
| 11 | Mexico | 0 | 0 | 2 | 2 |
| 12 | Nicaragua | 0 | 0 | 1 | 1 |
| Totals (12 entries) | | 18 | 18 | 34 | 70 |
