= 2006 Pan American Judo Championships =

Judo competition

2006 Judo Pan American Judo Championships
- Venue: CeNARD
- Location: Buenos Aires, Argentina
- Dates: 25–26 May 2006

Competition at external databases
- Links: JudoInside

The 2006 Pan American Judo Championships were held in Centro Nacional de Alto Rendimiento Deportivo in Buenos Aires, Argentina from 25 May to 26 May 2006.

== Medal overview ==
=== Men's events ===
Event	Gold	Silver	Bronze
–55 kg	Robert Gómez (DOM)	Jorge Morales (CUB)	Carlos Tenesaca (ECU)
–55 kg	Robert Gómez (DOM)	Jorge Morales (CUB)	Thiago Aoki (BRA)
–60 kg	Frazer Will (CAN)	Jeremy Liggett (USA)	Javier Guédez (VEN)
–60 kg	Frazer Will (CAN)	Jeremy Liggett (USA)	Denílson Lourenço (BRA)
–66 kg	Yordanis Arencibia (CUB)	Leandro Cunha (BRA)	Sasha Mehmedovic (CAN)
–66 kg	Yordanis Arencibia (CUB)	Leandro Cunha (BRA)	Ludwig Ortiz (VEN)
–73 kg	Moacir Mendes (BRA)	Rodrigo Lucenti (ARG)	Richard León (VEN)
–73 kg	Moacir Mendes (BRA)	Rodrigo Lucenti (ARG)	Ronald Girones (CUB)
–81 kg	Flávio Canto (BRA)	Tyler Boras (CAN)	Emmanuel Lucenti (ARG)
–81 kg	Flávio Canto (BRA)	Tyler Boras (CAN)	Aaron Cohen (USA)
–90 kg	Hugo Pessanha (BRA)	Jorge Benavides (CUB)	Eduardo Costa (ARG)
–90 kg	Hugo Pessanha (BRA)	Jorge Benavides (CUB)	José Camacho (VEN)
–100 kg	Oreidis Despaigne (CUB)	Mário Sabino (BRA)	Teófilo Diek (DOM)
–100 kg	Oreidis Despaigne (CUB)	Mário Sabino (BRA)	Alexandru Ciupe (CAN)
+100 kg	Daniel Hernandes (BRA)	Óscar Brayson (CUB)	Joel Brutus (HAI)
+100 kg	Daniel Hernandes (BRA)	Óscar Brayson (CUB)	Pablo Figueroa (PUR)
Openweight	Carlos Honorato (BRA)	Óscar Brayson (CUB)	Claudio Zupo (MEX)
Openweight	Carlos Honorato (BRA)	Óscar Brayson (CUB)	Pablo Figueroa (PUR)

=== Women's events ===
Event	Gold	Silver	Bronze
–44 kg	Milagros González (VEN)	Diana Cobos (ECU)	Dayaris Mestre Álvarez (CUB)
–44 kg	Milagros González (VEN)	Diana Cobos (ECU)	Lorayna Costa (BRA)
–48 kg	Yanet Bermoy (CUB)	Daniela Polzin (BRA)	Glenda Miranda (ECU)
–48 kg	Yanet Bermoy (CUB)	Daniela Polzin (BRA)	Sayaka Matsumoto (USA)
–52 kg	Aminata Sall (CAN)	Melissa Rodríguez (ARG)	Érika Miranda (BRA)
–52 kg	Aminata Sall (CAN)	Melissa Rodríguez (ARG)	Edilia Amorós (CUB)
–57 kg	Yurisleidy Lupetey (CUB)	Danielle Zangrando (BRA)	Valerie Gotay (USA)
–57 kg	Yurisleidy Lupetey (CUB)	Danielle Zangrando (BRA)	Diana Villavicencio (ECU)
–63 kg	Yaritza Abel (CUB)	Ronda Rousey (USA)	Daniela Krukower (ARG)
–63 kg	Yaritza Abel (CUB)	Ronda Rousey (USA)	Marie-Hélène Chisholm (CAN)
–70 kg	Yalennis Castillo (CUB)	Kelly Silva (BRA)	Katie Mocco (USA)
–70 kg	Yalennis Castillo (CUB)	Kelly Silva (BRA)	Catherine Roberge (CAN)
–78 kg	Edinanci Silva (BRA)	Amy Cotton (CAN)	Yurisel Laborde (CUB)
–78 kg	Edinanci Silva (BRA)	Amy Cotton (CAN)	Lorena Briceño (ARG)
+78 kg	Ibis Dueñas (CUB)	Giovanna Blanco (VEN)	Carmen Chalá (ECU)
+78 kg	Ibis Dueñas (CUB)	Giovanna Blanco (VEN)	Melissa Mojica (PUR)
Openweight	Giovanna Blanco (VEN)	Priscila Marques (BRA)	Melissa Mojica (PUR)
Openweight	Giovanna Blanco (VEN)	Priscila Marques (BRA)	Ibis Dueñas (CUB)

== Medals table ==
Rank	Nation	Gold	Silver	Bronze	Total
1	Cuba	7	4	5	16
2	Brazil	6	6	4	16
3	Canada	2	2	4	8
4	Venezuela	2	1	4	7
5	Dominican Republic	1	0	1	2
6	Argentina	0	2	4	6
6	United States	0	2	4	6
8	Ecuador	0	1	4	5
9	Puerto Rico	0	0	4	4
10	Haiti	0	0	1	1
10	Mexico	0	0	1	1
Totals (11 entries)		18	18	36	72
