= Yalennis Castillo =

Cuban judoka (born 1986)

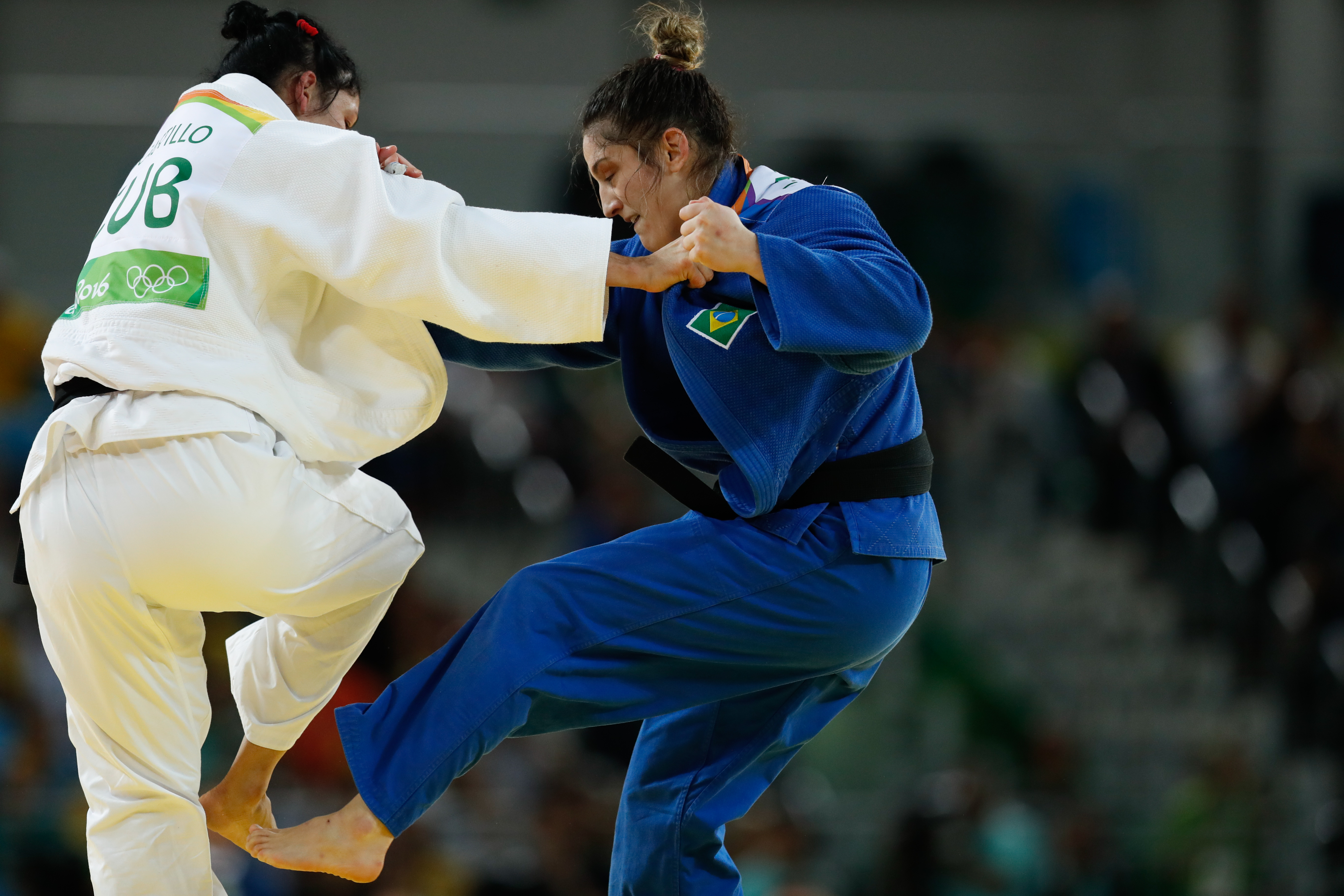
- Castillo (left) at the 2016 Summer Olympics

Personal information
- Full name: Yalennis Castillo Ramírez
- Born: 21 May 1986 (age 40)
- Occupation: Judoka

Sport
- Country: Cuba
- Sport: Judo
- Weight class: ‍–‍70 kg, ‍–‍78 kg

Achievements and titles
- Olympic Games: (silver) (2008)
- World Champ.: 7th (2007, 2014)
- Pan American Champ.: (2006, 2014)
Medal record
Women's judo
Representing Cuba
Olympic Games
Silver medal – second place	2008 Beijing	‍–‍78 kg
World Championships
Silver medal – second place	2006 Paris	Women's team
Pan American Games
Bronze medal – third place	2011 Guadalajara	‍–‍78 kg
Bronze medal – third place	2015 Toronto	‍–‍78 kg
Pan American Championships
Gold medal – first place	2006 Buenos Aires	‍–‍70 kg
Gold medal – first place	2014 Guayaquil	‍–‍78 kg
Silver medal – second place	2008 Miami	‍–‍70 kg
Silver medal – second place	2010 San Salvador	‍–‍78 kg
Silver medal – second place	2012 Montreal	‍–‍78 kg
Bronze medal – third place	2004 Isla Margarita	‍–‍78 kg
Bronze medal – third place	2004 Isla Margarita	Open
Bronze medal – third place	2011 Guadalajara	‍–‍78 kg
Bronze medal – third place	2015 Edmonton	‍–‍78 kg
Bronze medal – third place	2016 Havana	‍–‍78 kg
IJF Grand Prix
Bronze medal – third place	2014 Havana	‍–‍78 kg
Bronze medal – third place	2016 Almaty	‍–‍78 kg

Profile at external databases
- IJF: 3082
- JudoInside.com: 38896
- Updated on 30 May 2023

Yalennis Castillo Ramírez (born 21 May 1986) is a Cuban judoka. She was born in Moa, Holguín, Cuba on 21 May 1986. She practiced judo since she was a child.

Castillo first won medals in the 2004 Pan American Championships and the Leonding Tournament in Austria. She won the silver medal in the women's team event of the 2006 World Team Championships and a bronze medal in the 2007 World Cup in Vienna, Austria. That year she also participated in the 2007 World Championships in Rio de Janeiro, Brazil.

Castillo's greatest result was in the 2008, where Castillo won a silver medal in the ‍–‍78 kg category at the 2008 Summer Olympics in a disputed match against the local contender Yang Xiuli. During 2008 she also won the Torneo de Cuenca in Ecuador, the Tre Torri in Italy, the Super Cup of the World, in Hamburg, Germany, and the 2008 Pan American Championships in Miami, USA.

Castillo was intermittently in and out of international competition due to an injury and because she married Cuban baseball player Frank Morejón and had a child. By 2014 she had returned to competition. She participated at the 2016 Summer Olympics in Rio de Janeiro. There, she lost in the quarterfinals to Anamari Velenšek from Slovenia and then lost the bronze medal match through the repechage, finishing 5th.
