= 2005 Pan American Judo Championships =

Judo competition

2005 Judo Pan American Judo Championships
- Venue: Caguas
- Location: Caguas, Puerto Rico
- Dates: 19–21 May 2005

Competition at external databases
- Links: JudoInside

The 2005 Pan American Judo Championships was held in Coliseo Solá Besarez in Caguas, Puerto Rico from 19 May to 20 May 2005.

== Medal overview ==
=== Men's events ===
Event	Gold	Silver	Bronze
55 kg	Carlos Tenesaca (ECU)	Aaron Kunihiro (USA)	Luis Melendez (PUR)
55 kg	Carlos Tenesaca (ECU)	Aaron Kunihiro (USA)	Jhonny Guaca (COL)
60 kg	Miguel Albaracín (ARG)	Daniel Loureido (BRA)	Frazer Will (CAN)
60 kg	Miguel Albaracín (ARG)	Daniel Loureido (BRA)	Modesto Lara (DOM)
66 kg	João Derly (BRA)	Juan Jacinto (DOM)	Roberto Ibáñez (ECU)
66 kg	João Derly (BRA)	Juan Jacinto (DOM)	Felipe Novoa (CHI)
73 kg	Ryan Reser (USA)	Diogo Coutinho (BRA)	Abraham Negrete (MEX)
73 kg	Ryan Reser (USA)	Diogo Coutinho (BRA)	Yamil Delgado (PUR)
81 kg	Tiago Camilo (BRA)	Tyler Boras (CAN)	Aaron Cohen (USA)
81 kg	Tiago Camilo (BRA)	Tyler Boras (CAN)	Abderraman Brenes (PUR)
90 kg	Eduardo Costa (ARG)	Gervais Turcotte (CAN)	Dariusz Mikolajczak (USA)
90 kg	Eduardo Costa (ARG)	Gervais Turcotte (CAN)	Alessandro Merly (BRA)
100 kg	Luciano Corrêa (BRA)	Alexandru Ciupe (CAN)	Teofilo Diek (DOM)
100 kg	Luciano Corrêa (BRA)	Alexandru Ciupe (CAN)	Edgardo Adames (PUR)
+ 100 kg	Walter Santos (BRA)	Joel Brutus (HAI)	Trevor McAlpine (CAN)
+ 100 kg	Walter Santos (BRA)	Joel Brutus (HAI)	Kirk Hoffmann (USA)
Openweight	Walter Santos (BRA)	Carlos Santiago (PUR)	Trevor McAlpine (CAN)
Openweight	Walter Santos (BRA)	Carlos Santiago (PUR)	Joel Brutus (HAI)

=== Women's events ===
Event	Gold	Silver	Bronze
44 kg	Maira Viveros (COL)	Paula Pareto (ARG)	Sarah Menezes (BRA)
44 kg	Maira Viveros (COL)	Paula Pareto (ARG)	Evelyn Rodriguez (GUA)}
48 kg	Glenda Miranda (ECU)	Isabel Latulippe (CAN)	Sayaka Matsumoto (USA)
48 kg	Glenda Miranda (ECU)	Isabel Latulippe (CAN)	Andressa Fernandes (BRA)
52 kg	Carrie Chandler (USA)	Maria Garcia (DOM)	Aminata Sall (CAN)
52 kg	Carrie Chandler (USA)	Maria Garcia (DOM)	Fabiane Hukuda (BRA)
57 kg	Valerie Gotay (USA)	Roberta Bittencourt (BRA)	Michelle Buckingham (CAN)
57 kg	Valerie Gotay (USA)	Roberta Bittencourt (BRA)	Diana Villavicencio (ECU)
63 kg	Ronda Rousey (USA)	Marie-Hélène Chisholm (CAN)	Jessica García (PUR)
63 kg	Ronda Rousey (USA)	Marie-Hélène Chisholm (CAN)	Daniela Krukower (ARG)
70 kg	Diana Chalá (ECU)	Marcia Vieira (BRA)	Catherine Roberge (CAN)
70 kg	Diana Chalá (ECU)	Marcia Vieira (BRA)	Elizabeth Copes (ARG)
78 kg	Amy Cotton (CAN)	Claudirene César (BRA)	Molly O'Rourke (USA)
78 kg	Amy Cotton (CAN)	Claudirene César (BRA)	Leidi Germán (DOM)
+ 78 kg	Carmen Chalá (ECU)	Vanessa Zambotti (MEX)	Olia Berger (CAN)
+ 78 kg	Carmen Chalá (ECU)	Vanessa Zambotti (MEX)	Suelen Altheman (BRA)
Openweight	Carmen Chalá (ECU)	Melissa Mojica (PUR)	Olia Berger (CAN)
Openweight	Carmen Chalá (ECU)	Melissa Mojica (PUR)	Vanessa Zambotti (MEX)

== Medals table ==
Rank	Nation	Gold	Silver	Bronze	Total
1	Brazil	5	5	5	15
2	Ecuador	5	0	2	7
3	United States	4	1	5	10
4	Argentina	2	1	2	5
5	Canada	1	5	8	14
6	Colombia	1	0	1	2
7	Puerto Rico	0	2	5	7
8	Dominican Republic	0	2	3	5
9	Mexico	0	1	2	3
10	Haiti	0	1	1	2
11	Chile	0	0	1	1
11	Guatemala	0	0	1	1
Totals (12 entries)		18	18	36	72
