= Yanet Bermoy =

Cuban judoka (born 1987)

Personal information
- Full name: Yanet Bermoy Acosta
- Born: 29 May 1987 (age 39) Cienfuegos, Cuba
- Occupation: Judoka

Sport
- Country: Cuba
- Sport: Judo
- Weight class: –48 kg, –52 kg

Achievements and titles
- Olympic Games: (silver) (2008, 2012)
- World Champ.: (2005)
- Pan American Champ.: (2006, 2007, 2008, 2009, 2011, 2013)
Medal record
Women's judo
Representing Cuba
Olympic Games
Silver medal – second place	2008 Beijing	‍–‍48 kg
Silver medal – second place	2012 London	‍–‍52 kg
World Championships
Gold medal – first place	2005 Cairo	‍–‍48 kg
Silver medal – second place	2007 Rio de Janeiro	‍–‍48 kg
Silver medal – second place	2009 Rotterdam	‍–‍52 kg
Pan American Games
Gold medal – first place	2007 Rio de Janeiro	‍–‍48 kg
Gold medal – first place	2011 Guadalajara	‍–‍52 kg
Pan American Championships
Gold medal – first place	2006 Buenos Aires	‍–‍48 kg
Gold medal – first place	2007 Montreal	‍–‍48 kg
Gold medal – first place	2008 Miami	‍–‍48 kg
Gold medal – first place	2009 Buenos Aires	‍–‍52 kg
Gold medal – first place	2011 Guadalajara	‍–‍52 kg
Gold medal – first place	2013 San José	‍–‍52 kg
Silver medal – second place	2010 San Salvador	‍–‍52 kg
Silver medal – second place	2014 Guayaquil	‍–‍52 kg
Bronze medal – third place	2012 Montreal	‍–‍52 kg
IJF Grand Slam
Bronze medal – third place	2008 Tokyo	‍–‍52 kg
Bronze medal – third place	2011 Tokyo	‍–‍52 kg
Bronze medal – third place	2012 Paris	‍–‍52 kg
Bronze medal – third place	2012 Tokyo	‍–‍52 kg
IJF Grand Prix
Gold medal – first place	2013 Miami	‍–‍52 kg
Gold medal – first place	2014 Havana	‍–‍52 kg
Bronze medal – third place	2012 Düsseldorf	‍–‍52 kg
World Juniors Championships
Gold medal – first place	2006 Santo Domingo	‍–‍48 kg
Summer Universiade
Silver medal – second place	2013 Kazan	‍–‍52 kg
Bronze medal – third place	2009 Belgrade	‍–‍52 kg
Central American and Caribbean Games
Gold medal – first place	2006 Cartagena	‍–‍48 kg
Gold medal – first place	2006 Cartagena	Women's team

Profile at external databases
- IJF: 952, 6401
- JudoInside.com: 32800
- Updated on 28 May 2023

Yanet Bermoy Acosta (born 29 May 1987 in Cienfuegos) is a Cuban judoka. She won the silver medal in the Women's 48 kg at the 2008 Summer Olympics and the silver medal in the Women's 52 kg at the 2012 Summer Olympics.
