= Óscar Brayson =

Cuban judoka (born 1985)

Personal information
- Born: 10 February 1985 (age 41)
- Occupation: Judoka

Sport
- Country: Cuba
- Sport: Judo
- Weight class: +100 kg

Achievements and titles
- Olympic Games: (bronze) (2008)
- World Champ.: (silver) (2009)
- Pan American Champ.: (gold) (2008, 2009, 2010, 2011)
Medal record
Men's judo
Representing Cuba
Olympic Games
Bronze medal – third place	2008 Beijing	+100 kg
World Championships
Silver medal – second place	2009 Rotterdam	+100 kg
Pan American Games
Gold medal – first place	2007 Rio de Janeiro	+100 kg
Gold medal – first place	2011 Guadalajara	+100 kg
Pan American Championships
Gold medal – first place	2008 Miami	Open
Gold medal – first place	2009 Buenos Aires	+100 kg
Gold medal – first place	2010 San Salvador	+100 kg
Gold medal – first place	2011 Guadalajara	+100 kg
Silver medal – second place	2006 Buenos Aires	+100 kg
Silver medal – second place	2006 Buenos Aires	Open
Silver medal – second place	2007 Montreal	+100 kg
Silver medal – second place	2007 Montreal	Open
Silver medal – second place	2008 Miami	+100 kg
Silver medal – second place	2009 Buenos Aires	Open
Silver medal – second place	2012 Montreal	+100 kg
Silver medal – second place	2013 San José	+100 kg
Silver medal – second place	2014 Guayaquil	+100 kg
IJF Grand Slam
Bronze medal – third place	2008 Tokyo	+100 kg
Bronze medal – third place	2011 Paris	+100 kg
IJF Grand Prix
Silver medal – second place	2009 Hamburg	+100 kg
Bronze medal – third place	2014 Havana	+100 kg
Central American and Caribbean Games
Gold medal – first place	2006 Cartagena	+100 kg
Gold medal – first place	2006 Cartagena	Open

Profile at external databases
- IJF: 963
- JudoInside.com: 36805
- Updated on 30 May 2023

Óscar René Brayson Vidal (also spelled Braison; born 10 February 1985) is a Cuban judoka and Kazakh wrestling style athlete. Born in Camagüey, he won a bronze medal at the 2008 Summer Olympics, and gold at the first Alem barysy tournament in Pavlodar in 2014.
