= Edinanci Silva =

Brazilian judoka (born 1976)

Personal information
- Born: 23 August 1976 (age 49)
- Occupation: Judoka

Sport
- Country: Brazil
- Sport: Judo
- Weight class: ‍–‍72 kg, ‍–‍78 kg

Achievements and titles
- Olympic Games: 5th (2008)
- World Champ.: (bronze) (1997, 2003)
- Pan American Champ.: (2003, 2004, 2006, 2007)
Medal record
Women's judo
Representing Brazil
World Championships
Bronze medal – third place	1997 Paris	‍–‍72 kg
Bronze medal – third place	2003 Osaka	‍–‍78 kg
Pan American Games
Gold medal – first place	2003 Santo Domingo	‍–‍78 kg
Gold medal – first place	2007 Rio de Janeiro	‍–‍78 kg
Bronze medal – third place	1999 Winnipeg	‍–‍78 kg
Pan American Championships
Gold medal – first place	2003 Salvador	‍–‍78 kg
Gold medal – first place	2004 Isla Margarita	‍–‍78 kg
Gold medal – first place	2006 Buenos Aires	‍–‍78 kg
Gold medal – first place	2007 Montreal	‍–‍78 kg
Silver medal – second place	2008 Miami	‍–‍78 kg
Bronze medal – third place	1997 Guadalajara	‍–‍72 kg

Profile at external databases
- IJF: 52719
- JudoInside.com: 682
- Updated on 19 November 2022

Edinanci Fernandes da Silva (born 23 August 1976) is a judoka from Brazil, who won the gold medal in the half heavyweight division (‍–‍78 kg) at the Pan American Games. A resident of São Paulo born in Sousa, Paraíba, she represented her country at four consecutive Summer Olympics, starting in 1996 in Atlanta, Georgia.

Edinanci is born intersex. In the mid-1990s, she had surgery, in order to live and compete as a woman.
