= Yurisleidy Lupetey =

Cuban judoka (born 1981)

Personal information
- Born: 6 May 1981 (age 45)
- Occupation: Judoka

Sport
- Country: Cuba
- Sport: Judo
- Weight class: –57 kg

Achievements and titles
- Olympic Games: (bronze) (2004)
- World Champ.: (gold) (2001)
- Pan American Champ.: (gold) (2001, 2002, 2006, 2009, 2010, 2011)
Medal record
Women's judo
Representing Cuba
Olympic Games
| Bronze medal – third place | 2004 Athens | ‍–‍57 kg |
World Championships
| Gold medal – first place | 2001 Munich | ‍–‍57 kg |
| Bronze medal – third place | 2003 Osaka | ‍–‍57 kg |
Pan American Games
| Gold medal – first place | 2003 Santo Domingo | ‍–‍57 kg |
| Gold medal – first place | 2011 Guadalajara | ‍–‍57 kg |
Pan American Championships
| Gold medal – first place | 2001 Cordoba | ‍–‍57 kg |
| Gold medal – first place | 2002 Santo Domingo | ‍–‍57 kg |
| Gold medal – first place | 2006 Buenos Aires | ‍–‍57 kg |
| Gold medal – first place | 2009 Buenos Aires | ‍–‍57 kg |
| Gold medal – first place | 2010 San Salvador | ‍–‍57 kg |
| Gold medal – first place | 2011 Guadalajara | ‍–‍57 kg |
| Silver medal – second place | 2004 Isla Margarita | ‍–‍57 kg |
| Bronze medal – third place | 2008 Miami | ‍–‍57 kg |
| Bronze medal – third place | 2012 Montreal | ‍–‍57 kg |
World Juniors Championships
| Gold medal – first place | 2000 Nabeul | ‍–‍57 kg |
| Bronze medal – third place | 1998 Cali | ‍–‍57 kg |
Summer Universiade
| Gold medal – first place | 2001 Beijing | ‍–‍57 kg |
| Bronze medal – third place | 2003 Jeju | ‍–‍57 kg |
Central American and Caribbean Games
| Gold medal – first place | 2006 Cartagena | ‍–‍57 kg |

Profile at external databases
- IJF: 954
- JudoInside.com: 976
- Updated on 31 May 2023

Yurisleidy Lupetey Cobas (born 6 May 1981) is a Cuban judoka. The 2001 World Champion in the ‍–‍57 kg division, at the 2004 Summer Olympics she won the bronze medal in the women's Lightweight (‍–‍57 kg) category, together with Deborah Gravenstijn of the Netherlands.

Lupetey also competed at the 2008 and 2012 Summer Olympics.
