= Mário Sabino =

Brazilian judoka (1972–2019)

Personal information
- Full name: Mário Sabino Júnior
- Born: 23 September 1972 Bauru, São Paulo, Brazil
- Died: 25 October 2019 (aged 47) Bauru, São Paulo, Brazil
- Occupation: Judoka

Sport
- Country: Brazil
- Sport: Judo
- Weight class: ‍–‍100 kg

Achievements and titles
- Olympic Games: 7th (2000)
- World Champ.: (bronze) (2003)
- Pan American Champ.: (gold) (2003)
Medal record
Men's judo
Representing Brazil
World Championships
Bronze medal – third place	2003 Osaka	‍–‍100 kg
Pan American Games
Gold medal – first place	2003 Santo Domingo	‍–‍100 kg
Pan American Championships
Gold medal – first place	2003 Salvador	‍–‍100 kg
Silver medal – second place	2004 Isla Margarita	‍–‍100 kg
Silver medal – second place	2006 Buenos Aires	‍–‍100 kg
South American Games
Gold medal – first place	2002 Rio de Janeiro	‍–‍100 kg
Summer Universiade
Silver medal – second place	1995 Fukuoka	86 kg

Profile at external databases
- IJF: 49087, 2625
- JudoInside.com: 6760
- Updated on 19 November 2022

Mário Sabino Júnior (23 September 1972 – 25 October 2019) was a Brazilian judoka, who won the gold medal in the half heavyweight division (‍–‍100 kg) at the 2003 Pan American Games. In the final he defeated Canada's Nicolas Gill. He represented his native country a year later at the 2000 Summer Olympics in Sydney, Australia and at the 2004 Summer Olympics in Athens, Greece.

Sabino died at age 47 on 25 October 2019, after being shot in Bauru.
