= Melissa Mojica =

Puerto Rican judoka (born 1983)

Personal information
- Full name: Melissa Mojica Rosario
- Born: December 29, 1983 (age 42) Trujillo Alto, Puerto Rico
- Occupation: Judoka
- Years active: 2005–2016
- Height: 5 ft 10 in (178 cm)
- Weight: 265 lb (120 kg)

Sport
- Country: Puerto Rico
- Sport: Judo
- Weight class: +78 kg

Achievements and titles
- Olympic Games: R16 (2012, 2016)
- World Champ.: 7th (2021)
- Pan American Champ.: (2008)
Medal record
Women's judo
Representing Puerto Rico
Pan American Games
Silver medal – second place	2011 Guadalajara	+78 kg
Silver medal – second place	2019 Lima	+78 kg
Pan American Championships
Gold medal – first place	2008 Miami	Open
Silver medal – second place	2005 Caguas	Open
Silver medal – second place	2007 Montreal	+78 kg
Silver medal – second place	2012 Montreal	+78 kg
Bronze medal – third place	2006 Buenos Aires	+78 kg
Bronze medal – third place	2006 Buenos Aires	Open
Bronze medal – third place	2008 Miami	+78 kg
Bronze medal – third place	2010 San Salvador	+78 kg
Bronze medal – third place	2010 San Salvador	Open
Bronze medal – third place	2011 Guadalajara	+78 kg
Bronze medal – third place	2013 San José	+78 kg
Bronze medal – third place	2016 Havana	+78 kg
Bronze medal – third place	2019 Lima	+78 kg
Bronze medal – third place	2021 Guadalajara	+78 kg
IJF Grand Slam
Silver medal – second place	2012 Moscow	+78 kg
Bronze medal – third place	2009 Rio de Janeiro	+78 kg
IJF Grand Prix
Silver medal – second place	2016 Samsun	+78 kg
Bronze medal – third place	2016 Almaty	+78 kg
Bronze medal – third place	2019 Montreal	+78 kg
Central American and Caribbean Games
Gold medal – first place	2010 Mayaguez	+78 kg
Gold medal – first place	2010 Mayaguez	Open
Silver medal – second place	2010 Mayaguez	Women's team
Bronze medal – third place	2006 Cartagena	+78 kg
Bronze medal – third place	2006 Cartagena	Open
Bronze medal – third place	2014 Veracruz	+78 kg

Profile at external databases
- IJF: 959
- JudoInside.com: 42640
- Updated on November 27, 2022

Melissa Mojica Rosario (born December 29, 1983) is a Puerto Rican judoka.

== Early and personal life ==
She was born in Trujillo Alto, Puerto Rico, on December 29, 1983. She is 120.2 kilograms (265 lb). Her parents are Carmelo Mojica and Julia Rosario, and she has two sisters: Melani and Julisa. Mojica went to the Medardo Carazo High School and studied Biology at University of Turabo.

== Judo career ==
Mojica won the bronze medal in both, the open and the over 78 kg division of the 2006 Central American and Caribbean Games. She won the gold medal in the 2008 Pan American Judo Championships in Miami.

She won the gold medal in the over 78 kg and the open category, as well the silver in the team competition at the 2010 Central American and Caribbean Games, held in her home country, Puerto Rico.

At the 2011 Pan American Games she lost the final to the Cuban Idalys Ortiz to win the silver medal at the +78 kg category in the regional games held in Guadalajara, Mexico.

Mojica won in May 2012, the silver medal at the Moscow Grand Slam, after being defeated by the Brazilian Maria Suelen Altheman who won her category gold medal. At the 2012 Summer Olympics, she defeated the Saudi teenager Wojdan Shaherkani, who competed with a special hijab, in only 82 seconds. After the combat Mojica claimed that she does not care about religious issues, but every woman should have the opportunity to compete at the Olympics. She then lost to Russian Elena Ivashchenko by Ippon in the second round, ending her participation in the +78 kg category at London, United Kingdom.

== Achievements ==
Year	Tournament	Place	Weight class
2005	Pan American Judo Championships	2nd	Openweight
2006	Pan American Judo Championships	3rd	Heavyweight (+78 kg)
2006	Pan American Judo Championships	3rd	Openweight
2007	Pan American Judo Championships	2nd	Heavyweight (+78 kg)
2007	Pan American Judo Championships	5th	Openweight
2007	Pan American Games	5th	Heavyweight (+78 kg)
2007	World Judo Championships	AC	Heavyweight (+78 kg)
2008	Pan American Judo Championships	3rd	Heavyweight (+78 kg)
2008	Pan American Judo Championships	1st	Openweight
2009	World Judo Championships	AC	Heavyweight (+78 kg)
2010	Pan American Judo Championships	3rd	Heavyweight (+78 kg)
2010	Pan American Judo Championships	3rd	Openweight
2011	Pan American Judo Championships	3rd	Heavyweight (+78 kg)
