= Judo at the 2007 Pan American Games =

Judo Judo at the 2007 Pan American Games
- Venue: Riocentro complex
- Location: Rio de Janeiro, Brazil
- Dates: July 19–22

Competition at external databases
- Links: JudoInside

Judo at the 2007 Pan American Games was held from July 19 to 22, 2007, in Rio de Janeiro, Brazil at the Riocentro complex. There were seven weight divisions each for men and women, for a total of 14 events.

== Medal table ==
* Host nation (Brazil)

Rank	Nation	Gold	Silver	Bronze	Total
1	Cuba	5	3	5	13
2	Brazil*	4	6	3	13
3	United States	3	1	2	6
4	Argentina	1	0	3	4
5	Mexico	1	0	0	1
6	Ecuador	0	2	1	3
7	Canada	0	1	3	4
8	Colombia	0	1	1	2
9	Venezuela	0	0	5	5
10	Dominican Republic	0	0	2	2
11	El Salvador	0	0	1	1
11	Haiti	0	0	1	1
11	Peru	0	0	1	1
Totals (13 entries)		14	14	28	56

== Men's competition ==
=== Extra-lightweight (60 kg) ===
Rank	Name
Gold medal	Miguel Albarracín (ARG)
Silver medal	Yosmani Piker (CUB)
Bronze medal	Alexandre Lee (BRA)
Bronze medal	Javier Guédez (VEN)

=== Half-lightweight (66 kg) ===
Rank	Name
Gold medal	João Derly (BRA)
Silver medal	Roberto Ibáñez (ECU)
Bronze medal	Ludwig Ortíz (VEN)
Bronze medal	Yordanis Arencibia (CUB)

=== Lightweight (73 kg) ===
Rank	Name
Gold medal	Ryan Reser (USA)
Silver medal	Leandro Guilheiro (BRA)
Bronze medal	Ronald Girones (CUB)
Bronze medal	Nicholas Tritton (CAN)

=== Half-middleweight (81 kg) ===
Rank	Name
Gold medal	Travis Stevens (USA)
Silver medal	Mario Valles (COL)
Bronze medal	Oscar Cárdenas (CUB)
Bronze medal	Franklin Cisneros (ESA)

=== Middleweight (90 kg) ===
Rank	Name
Gold medal	Tiago Camilo (BRA)
Silver medal	Jorge Benavides (CUB)
Bronze medal	José Gregorio Camacho (VEN)
Bronze medal	Rick Hawn (USA)

=== Half-heavyweight (100 kg) ===
Rank	Name
Gold medal	Oreidis Despaigne (CUB)
Silver medal	Keith Morgan (CAN)
Bronze medal	Luciano Corrêa (BRA)
Bronze medal	Teofilo Diek (DOM)

=== Heavyweight (+100 kg) ===
Rank	Name
Gold medal	Óscar Brayson (CUB)
Silver medal	João Schlittler (BRA)
Bronze medal	Joel Brutus (HAI)
Bronze medal	Carlos Zegarra (PER)

== Women's competition ==
=== Extra-lightweight (48 kg) ===
Rank	Name
Gold medal	Yanet Bermoy (CUB)
Silver medal	Daniela Polzin (BRA)
Bronze medal	Paula Pareto (ARG)
Bronze medal	Jeanette Rodríguez (USA)

=== Half-lightweight (52 kg) ===
Rank	Name
Gold medal	Sheila Espinosa (CUB)
Silver medal	Érika Miranda (BRA)
Bronze medal	María García (DOM)
Bronze medal	Flor Velázquez (VEN)

=== Lightweight (57 kg) ===
Rank	Name
Gold medal	Danielle Zangrando (BRA)
Silver medal	Valerie Gotay (USA)
Bronze medal	Yagnelys Mestre (CUB)
Bronze medal	Diana Villavicencio (ECU)

=== Half-middleweight (63 kg) ===
Rank	Name
Gold medal	Driulys González (CUB)
Silver medal	Danielli Yuri (BRA)
Bronze medal	Daniela Krukower (ARG)
Bronze medal	Ysis Barreto (VEN)

=== Middleweight (70 kg) ===
Rank	Name
Gold medal	Ronda Rousey (USA)
Silver medal	Mayra Aguiar (BRA)
Bronze medal	Yuri Alvear (COL)
Bronze medal	Catherine Roberge (CAN)

=== Half-heavyweight (78 kg) ===
Rank	Name
Gold medal	Edinanci Silva (BRA)
Silver medal	Yurisel Laborde (CUB)
Bronze medal	Lorena Briceño (ARG)
Bronze medal	Marylise Lévesque (CAN)

=== Heavyweight (+78 kg) ===
Rank	Name
Gold medal	Vanessa Zambotti (MEX)
Silver medal	Carmen Chalá (ECU)
Bronze medal	Ivis Dueñas (CUB)
Bronze medal	Priscilla Marques (BRA)

== See also ==
- Judo at the 2008 Summer Olympics
