= Daniela Krukower =

Argentine judoka (born 1975)

Personal information
- Native name: דניאלה קרוקובר
- Full name: Daniela Yael Krukower
- Born: 6 January 1975 (age 51) Buenos Aires, Argentina
- Occupation: Judoka
- Website: krukower.com

Sport
- Country: Argentina
- Sport: Judo
- Weight class: ‍–‍63 kg
- Rank: 7th dan black belt

Achievements and titles
- Olympic Games: 5th (2004)
- World Champ.: (2003)
- Pan American Champ.: (2003, 2009)
Medal record
Women's judo
Representing Argentina
World Championships
Gold medal – first place	2003 Osaka	‍–‍63 kg
Pan American Games
Bronze medal – third place	2003 Santo Domingo	‍–‍63 kg
Bronze medal – third place	2007 Rio de Janeiro	‍–‍63 kg
Pan American Championships
Gold medal – first place	2003 Salvador	‍–‍63 kg
Gold medal – first place	2009 Buenos Aires	‍–‍63 kg
Silver medal – second place	1999 Montevideo	‍–‍63 kg
Silver medal – second place	2007 Montreal	‍–‍63 kg
Bronze medal – third place	2002 Santo Domingo	‍–‍63 kg
Bronze medal – third place	2005 Caguas	‍–‍63 kg
Bronze medal – third place	2006 Buenos Aires	‍–‍63 kg
Bronze medal – third place	2008 Miami	‍–‍63 kg
South American Games
Gold medal – first place	2006 Buenos Aires	‍–‍63 kg
Silver medal – second place	2002 Rio de Janeiro	‍–‍63 kg
Representing Israel
Maccabiah Games
Silver medal – second place	1997 Israel	‍–‍66 kg

Profile at external databases
- IJF: 2670
- JudoInside.com: 411
- Updated on 6 January 2022

Daniela Yael Krukower (Hebrew: דניאלה יעל קרוקובר; born 6 January 1975 in Colegiales, Buenos Aires) is a former judoka from Argentina.

== Biography ==
Krukower was born in Buenos Aires, Argentina to a Jewish family, and at an early age moved with her family to Israel where Daniela was introduced to judo. In the mid 90s Israel judo had two promising female judoka, Einat Yaron and Daniela, both competing in the ‍–‍63 kg category. The two girls were more rivals than they were friends. Daniela thought Yaron was favoured by the Israel Judo Association and since the International Judo Federation limits each country to one participant in each category at the Olympic Games she decided to represent her birth country Argentina.

Krukower retired at beginning of 2009/10 season due to lack of motivation after winning gold at 2009 Pan American Championships.

== Judo ==
In 1997, Krukower won a silver medal in judo at U66 at the 1997 Maccabiah Games in Tel Aviv, Israel.

The highlight of Krukower's career came at the 2003 World Championships in Osaka. In the final she beat, by ippon, Cuban Olympic gold medalist Driulis González. She was not considered a favorite before the championships, but was a known competitor. After her win, Krukower became a celebrity in Argentina and a medal hope for the Olympic Games the following year.

Unlike at the World Championships in Osaka, at the 2004 Summer Olympics in Athens Krukower came as big favourite. She won her first two fights by golden score and in the semi-final she faced Ayumi Tanimoto from Japan. Early in the fight, following a technique by the Japanese judoka, Krukower broke her hand. The extent of the injury was serious and Krukower could not continue in tournament. Driulis González her next potential opponent won the bronze medal without a fight. In result of the injury the Argentine media call Krukower "Iron Lady".

Krukower went on to compete but managed only continental successes.

In the judo competition at the 2005 Maccabiah Games, Krukower won a silver medal when 17-year-old Alice Schlesinger defeated her in the final.

== Achievements ==
=== Summer Olympics ===
Year	Place	Weight class
2000	9th	Middleweight (‍–‍70 kg)
2004	5th	Half-Middleweight (‍–‍63 kg)
2008	9th	Half-Middleweight (‍–‍63 kg)

=== World Championships ===
Year	Place	Weight class
1997	AC	Middleweight (‍–‍66 kg)
2001	DNS	—
2003	1st	Half-Middleweight (‍–‍63 kg)
2005	AC	Half-Middleweight (‍–‍63 kg)
2007	9th	Half-Middleweight (‍–‍63 kg)

=== Pan American Games ===
Year	Place	Weight class
2003	3rd	Half-Middleweight (‍–‍63 kg)
2007	3rd	Half-Middleweight (‍–‍63 kg)

=== Pan American Championships ===
Year	Place	Weight class
2005	3rd	Half-Middleweight (‍–‍63 kg)
2006	3rd	Half-Middleweight (‍–‍63 kg)
2007	2nd	Half-Middleweight (‍–‍63 kg)
2008	3rd	Half-Middleweight (‍–‍63 kg)
2009	1st	Half-Middleweight (‍–‍63 kg)

=== South American Games ===
Year	Place	Weight class
2002	2nd	Half-Middleweight (‍–‍63 kg)
2006	1st	Half-Middleweight (‍–‍63 kg)

== See also ==
- List of select Jewish judokas
