= Tiago Camilo =

Brazilian judoka (born 1982)

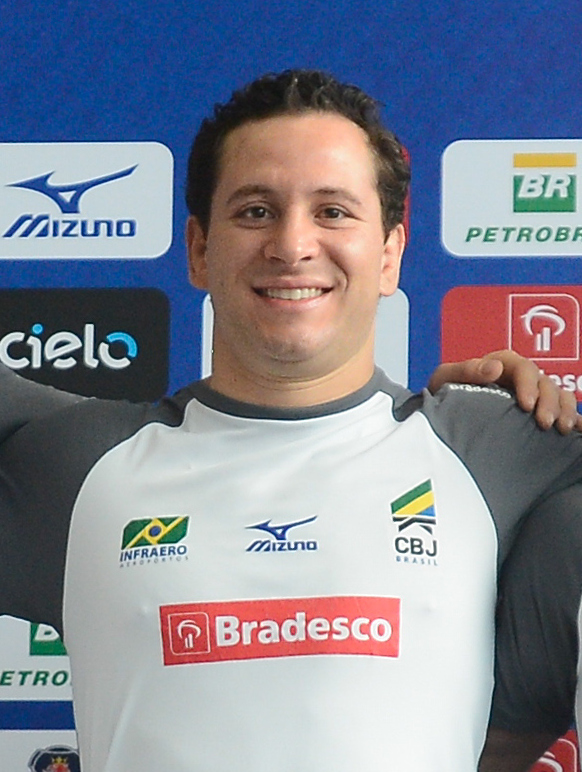
- Camilo in 2016

Personal information
- Nationality: Brazilian
- Born: 24 May 1982 (age 44) Tupã, SP, Brazil
- Occupation: Judoka
- Height: 180 cm (5 ft 11 in)

Sport
- Country: Brazil
- Sport: Judo
- Weight class: –73 kg, –81 kg, –90 kg
- Club: AD São Caetano; Esporte Clube Pinheiros
- Coached by: Renato Dagnino

Achievements and titles
- Olympic Games: (silver) (2000)
- World Champ.: (2007)
- Pan American Champ.: (2007, 2014, 2015, 2016)
Medal record
Men's judo
Representing Brazil
Olympic Games
Silver medal – second place	2000 Sydney	‍–‍73 kg
Bronze medal – third place	2008 Beijing	‍–‍81 kg
World Championships
Gold medal – first place	2007 Rio de Janeiro	‍–‍81 kg
Pan American Games
Gold medal – first place	2007 Rio de Janeiro	‍–‍90 kg
Gold medal – first place	2011 Guadalajara	‍–‍90 kg
Gold medal – first place	2015 Toronto	‍–‍90 kg
Pan American Championships
Gold medal – first place	2007 Montreal	‍–‍90 kg
Gold medal – first place	2014 Guayaquil	‍–‍90 kg
Gold medal – first place	2015 Edmonton	‍–‍90 kg
Gold medal – first place	2016 Havana	‍–‍90 kg
Silver medal – second place	2005 Caguas	‍–‍81 kg
Silver medal – second place	2013 San José	‍–‍90 kg
World Masters
Bronze medal – third place	2012 Almaty	‍–‍90 kg
IJF Grand Slam
Silver medal – second place	2010 Tokyo	‍–‍90 kg
Silver medal – second place	2011 Paris	‍–‍90 kg
Bronze medal – third place	2009 Moscow	‍–‍90 kg
Bronze medal – third place	2009 Rio de Janeiro	‍–‍90 kg
Bronze medal – third place	2010 Paris	‍–‍90 kg
Bronze medal – third place	2011 Rio de Janeiro	‍–‍90 kg
IJF Grand Prix
Gold medal – first place	2011 Amsterdam	‍–‍90 kg
Silver medal – second place	2013 Düsseldorf	‍–‍90 kg
Silver medal – second place	2014 Havana	‍–‍90 kg
Bronze medal – third place	2016 Samsun	‍–‍90 kg
World Juniors Championships
Gold medal – first place	1998 Cali	‍–‍66 kg
Pan American Junior Championships
Bronze medal – third place	1998 Maracaibo	‍–‍66 kg

Profile at external databases
- IJF: 433
- JudoInside.com: 673
- Updated on 30 May 2023

Tiago Henrique de Oliveira Camilo (born 24 May 1982) is a judoka from Brazil, who won the silver medal in the lightweight (‍–‍73 kg) division at the 2000 Summer Olympics. He also won a gold medal at the 2007 World Judo Championships, and was the third Brazilian to become a world champion in judo, after João Derly and Luciano Corrêa. At the 2008 Summer Olympics he won a bronze medal in the ‍–‍81 kg category. At the 2012 Olympic Games, he lost the bronze medal match to Ilias Iliadis in the ‍–‍90 kg weight division.
