= Isabelle Pearson =

Canadian judoka

Personal information
- Born: March 14, 1981 (age 45)
- Occupation: Judoka

Sport
- Sport: Judo
Medal record
Women's Judo
Representing Canada
Pan American Games
Bronze medal – third place	2003 S Domingo	Half Middleweight

Profile at external databases
- JudoInside.com: 13250

Isabelle Pearson (born March 14, 1981) is a female judoka from Canada, who won the bronze medal in the women's half middleweight division (+ 63 kg) at the 2003 Pan American Games in Santo Domingo, Dominican Republic, alongside Argentina's Daniela Krukower.

== See also ==
- Judo in Canada
