= Judo at the 2011 Pan American Games – Women's +78 kg =

Women's +78 kg at the 2011 Pan American Games
- Venue: CODE II Gymnasium
- Dates: October 26
- Competitors: 8 from 8 nations

Medalists
Gold medal	Idalys Ortiz	Cuba
Silver medal	Melissa Mojica	Puerto Rico
Bronze medal	Maria Suelen Altheman	Brazil
Bronze medal	Vanessa Zambotti	Mexico

The women's +78 kg competition of the judo events at the 2011 Pan American Games in Guadalajara, Mexico, was held on October 26 at the CODE II Gymanasium. The defending champion was Vanessa Zambotti of Mexico.

== Schedule ==
All times are Central Standard Time (UTC−6).

Date	Time	Round
October 26, 2011	11:16	Quarterfinals
October 26, 2011	12:04	Semifinals
October 26, 2011	13:08	Repechage
October 26, 2011	17:48	Bronze medal matches
October 26, 2011	18:04	Final

== Results ==
Legend

- 1st number = Ippon
- 2nd number = Waza-ari
- 3rd number = Yuko

=== Bracket ===
Quarter Finals
Idalys Ortiz (CUB)	100
Molly O'Rourke (USA)	000
Vanessa Zambotti (MEX)	111
Samantha Kessler (ARG)	000
Maria Suelen Altheman (BRA)	001
Giovanna Blanco (VEN)	000
Melissa Mojica (PUR)	100
Tanya Llamuca (ECU)	000

Semi Finals
Idalys Ortiz (CUB)	002
Vanessa Zambotti (MEX)	000
Maria Suelen Altheman (BRA)	000
Melissa Mojica (PUR)	100

Final
Idalys Ortiz (CUB)	101
Melissa Mojica (PUR)	000

=== Repechage round ===
Two bronze medals were awarded.

Semifinals
Molly O'Rourke (USA)	101
Samantha Kessler (ARG)	000
Giovanna Blanco (VEN)	111
Tanya Llamuca (ECU)	000

Finals
Molly O'Rourke (USA)	000
Maria Suelen Altheman (BRA)	100
Vanessa Zambotti (MEX)	100
Giovanna Blanco (VEN)	000
