= Vanessa Zambotti =

Mexican judoka (born 1982)

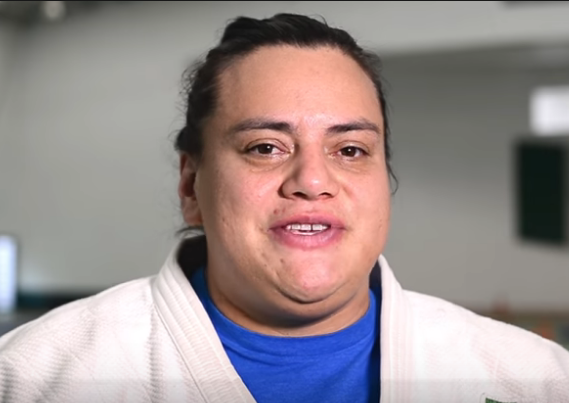

Personal information
- Full name: Vanessa Martina Zambotti Barreto
- Born: 4 March 1982 (age 44)
- Occupation: Judoka

Sport
- Country: Mexico
- Sport: Judo
- Weight class: +78 kg

Achievements and titles
- Olympic Games: 9th (2008)
- World Champ.: 7th (2009, 2015)
- Pan American Champ.: (2003)
Medal record
Women's judo
Representing Mexico
Pan American Games
Gold medal – first place	2007 Rio de Janeiro	+78 kg
Silver medal – second place	2015 Toronto	+78 kg
Bronze medal – third place	2011 Guadalajara	+78 kg
Pan American Championships
Gold medal – first place	2003 Salvador	+78 kg
Silver medal – second place	2002 Santo Domingo	+78 kg
Silver medal – second place	2005 Caguas	+78 kg
Silver medal – second place	2009 Buenos Aires	Open
Silver medal – second place	2010 San Salvador	+78 kg
Silver medal – second place	2010 San Salvador	Open
Silver medal – second place	2011 Guadalajara	+78 kg
Bronze medal – third place	2001 Cordoba	+78 kg
Bronze medal – third place	2001 Cordoba	Open
Bronze medal – third place	2002 Santo Domingo	Open
Bronze medal – third place	2004 Isla Margarita	+78 kg
Bronze medal – third place	2005 Caguas	Open
Bronze medal – third place	2007 Montreal	+78 kg
Bronze medal – third place	2008 Miami	+78 kg
Bronze medal – third place	2009 Buenos Aires	+78 kg
Bronze medal – third place	2012 Montreal	+78 kg
Bronze medal – third place	2015 Edmonton	+78 kg
IJF Grand Slam
Gold medal – first place	2012 Rio de Janeiro	+78 kg
Bronze medal – third place	2011 Rio de Janeiro	+78 kg
IJF Grand Prix
Bronze medal – third place	2016 Havana	+78 kg
Pan American Junior Championships
Gold medal – first place	2001 Acapulco	+78 kg
Central American and Caribbean Games
Bronze medal – third place	2006 Cartagena	+78 kg

Profile at external databases
- IJF: 3002
- JudoInside.com: 15874
- Updated on 27 November 2022

Vanessa Martina Zambotti Barreto (Note: In this Spanish name, the first or paternal surname is Zambotti and the second or maternal family name is Barreto.) (born 4 March 1982, Parral, Chihuahua) is a Mexican judoka.

== Early and personal life ==
Zambotti was born in Parral, Chihuahua. She lives in Mexico City and trains judo in CONADE. She earned a degree in Sports Administration at the Universidad del Valle de México.

During the 2003 Pan American Games she suffered an injury in the right shoulder. The injury did not look serious and she competed with it until summer of 2005, when the pain became unsufferable. A few weeks before the 2005 World Judo Championships in Cairo, she underwent surgery and spent a year recovering.

== Judo career ==
She participated in three Olympic Games.

Zambotti won the bronze medal of the over 78 kg division of the 2006 Central American and Caribbean Games.

In the 2004 Olympic Games she won her first match against Tsvetana Bozhilova from Bulgaria, but lost the second match against Barbara Andolina from Italy. The Italian competitor lost her next match, so Zambotti was not involved in the repêchage.

In the 2008 Olympic Games in Beijing she was a medal hope for Mexico as winner of Pan American Games from the previous year, but in her second match she was drawn against the Olympic champion from Athens, Maki Tsukada. She lost this match and finally took 9th place.

At the 2012 Summer Olympics, she was knocked out in the first round, losing to Tong Wen, one of the eventual bronze medalists.

== Achievements ==
Year	Tournament	Place	Weight class
2004	Olympic Games	AC	Heavyweight (+78 kg)
2005	Pan American Judo Championships	2nd	Heavyweight (+78 kg)
2005	Pan American Judo Championships	3rd	Openweight
2007	Pan American Judo Championships	3rd	Heavyweight (+78 kg)
2007	Pan American Games	1st	Heavyweight (+78 kg)
2007	World Judo Championships	AC	Heavyweight (+78 kg)
2008	Pan American Judo Championships	3rd	Heavyweight (+78 kg)
2008	Olympic Games	9th	Heavyweight (+78 kg)
2009	Pan American Judo Championships	3rd	Heavyweight (+78 kg)
2009	Pan American Judo Championships	2nd	Openweight
2009	World Judo Championships	7th	Heavyweight (+78 kg)
2010	Pan American Judo Championships	2nd	Heavyweight (+78 kg)
2010	Pan American Judo Championships	2nd	Openweight
2011	Pan American Judo Championships	2nd	Heavyweight (+78 kg)
