= Michael Barnes (judoka) =

American judoka (born 1973)

Personal information
- Born: August 7, 1973 (age 52)
Medal record
Men's Judo
Representing the United States
Pan American Games
Bronze medal – third place	2003	Half Heavyweight

Michael Barnes (born August 7, 1973) is a retired male judoka from the United States, who won the bronze medal in the men's half heavyweight division (-100 kg) at the 2003 Pan American Games, alongside Cuba's Oreidis Despaigne.
