= Claudio Zupo =

Mexican judoka (1984–2020)

Personal information
- Born: Claudio Zupo Gutiérrez; September 22, 1984 Hermosillo, Sonora, Mexico
- Died: 24 July 2020 (aged 35) Sonora, Mexico

Sport
- Sport: Judo
- Event: Openweight
Medal record
Men's judo
Representing Mexico
Pan American Championships
| Bronze medal – third place | 2006 Buenos Aires | Openweight |
Representing Mexico
Central American and Caribbean Games
| Silver medal – second place | 2006 Cartagena de Indias | Teams |

Claudio Zupo Gutiérrez (22 September 1984 – 24 July 2020) was a Mexican judoka. He was known as El gigante de Sonora ("the giant from Sonora").

== Career ==
Zupo participated in the 2005 and 2006 Pan American Championships; he won a bronze medal at the 2006 Pan American Judo Championships in the openweight category, and a silver medal at the 2006 Central American and Caribbean Games in the team category. He also won a Golden Medal at the 2006 Mexico City International Tournament, two silver medals at the 2008 and 2010 Mexican Championships, and one Golden Medal in the junior category at the 2002 National Olimpiade in San Luis Potosí.

After his withdrawal from the tatami, he served as trainer in the Sonora State Sports Commission (Codeson), and later as coordinator of the high-performance gym in Hermosillo, Sonora.

== Death ==
Zupo died in his native Sonora on 24 July 2020, aged 35, from COVID-19, during the pandemic in Mexico. On the previous day, his mother had also died from the same illness. His family claimed that he had been fired from the Codeson when he tested positive for COVID-19.
