= Oreidis Despaigne =

Cuban Olympic judoka (born 1981)

Personal information
- Full name: Oreidis Despaigne Terry
- Born: 20 September 1981 (age 44)
- Occupation: Judoka

Sport
- Country: Cuba
- Sport: Judo
- Weight class: ‍–‍100 kg

Achievements and titles
- Olympic Games: 9th (2004)
- World Champ.: (bronze) (2007, 2010)
- Pan American Champ.: (2004, 2006, 2007, 2009, 2010, 2010, 2011)
Medal record
Men's judo
Representing Cuba
World Championships
| Bronze medal – third place | 2007 Rio de Janeiro | ‍–‍100 kg |
| Bronze medal – third place | 2010 Tokyo | ‍–‍100 kg |
Pan American Games
| Gold medal – first place | 2007 Rio de Janeiro | ‍–‍100 kg |
| Silver medal – second place | 2011 Guadalajara | ‍–‍100 kg |
| Bronze medal – third place | 2003 Santo Domingo | ‍–‍100 kg |
Pan American Championships
| Gold medal – first place | 2004 Isla Margarita | ‍–‍100 kg |
| Gold medal – first place | 2006 Buenos Aires | ‍–‍100 kg |
| Gold medal – first place | 2007 Montreal | ‍–‍100 kg |
| Gold medal – first place | 2009 Buenos Aires | ‍–‍100 kg |
| Gold medal – first place | 2010 San Salvador | ‍–‍100 kg |
| Gold medal – first place | 2010 San Salvador | Open |
| Gold medal – first place | 2011 Guadalajara | ‍–‍100 kg |
| Silver medal – second place | 2002 Santo Domingo | ‍–‍100 kg |
| Bronze medal – third place | 2008 Miami | ‍–‍100 kg |
| Bronze medal – third place | 2012 Montreal | ‍–‍100 kg |
IJF Grand Slam
| Bronze medal – third place | 2008 Tokyo | ‍–‍100 kg |
Central American and Caribbean Games
| Gold medal – first place | 2006 Cartagena | ‍–‍100 kg |
| Gold medal – first place | 2006 Cartagena | Men's team |

Profile at external databases
- IJF: 962
- JudoInside.com: 13539
- Updated on 25 July 2023

Oreidis Despaigne Terry (born 20 September 1981) is a male judoka from Cuba, winner of the Pan American Games men's half heavyweight division at the 2007 Games. Terry also won a bronze medal at the 2003 Pan American Games and at the 2007 and 2010 World Championships.

Terry represented his native Cuba at the 2004 Summer Olympics in Athens, Greece, competing in the men's 100 kg category. At the 2008 Summer Olympics he reached the 3rd round, losing to Jang Sungho. At the 2012 Summer Olympics he reached the 2nd round, losing to Ramziddin Sayidov.

His older brother Yosvany Despaigne (born 1976) also competed as a judoka on the international level.
