= Judo at the 2003 Pan American Games =

Judo Judo at the 2003 Pan American Games
- Location: Santo Domingo, Dominican Republic
- Dates: 9–12 August 2003

Competition at external databases
- Links: JudoInside

Judo at the 2003 Pan American Games was held from 9-12 August, in Santo Domingo, Dominican Republic. There were seven weight divisions, for both men and women. Cuba dominated the women's competition.

== Medal table ==
| Place | Nation | Gold medal | Silver medal | Bronze medal | Total |
|---|---|---|---|---|---|
| 1 | Cuba | 8 | 3 | 3 | 14 |
| 2 | Brazil | 5 | 1 | 4 | 10 |
| 3 | United States | 1 | 2 | 4 | 7 |
| 4 | Canada | 0 | 3 | 4 | 7 |
| 4 | Venezuela | 0 | 3 | 4 | 7 |
| 6 | Haiti | 0 | 1 | 1 | 2 |
| 6 | Dominican Republic | 0 | 1 | 1 | 2 |
| 8 | Argentina | 0 | 0 | 3 | 3 |
| 9 | Colombia | 0 | 0 | 2 | 2 |
| 9 | Ecuador | 0 | 0 | 2 | 2 |
| Total | | 14 | 14 | 28 | 56 |

== Men's competition ==
=== Extra-Lightweight (– 60 kg) ===
| Rank | Name |
|---|---|
| Gold medal | Angelo Gómez (CUB) |
| Silver medal | Modesto Lara (DOM) |
| Bronze medal | Miguel Albarracin (ARG) |
| Bronze medal | Reiver Alvarenga (VEN) |

=== Half-Lightweight (– 66 kg) ===
| Rank | Name |
|---|---|
| Gold medal | Yordanis Arencibia (CUB) |
| Silver medal | Ludwig Ortíz (VEN) |
| Bronze medal | Henrique Guimarães (BRA) |
| Bronze medal | Alex Ottiano (USA) |

=== Lightweight (– 73 kg) ===
| Rank | Name |
|---|---|
| Gold medal | Luiz Camilo Jr (BRA) |
| Silver medal | Rubert Martínez (CUB) |
| Bronze medal | Ernst Laraque (HAI) |
| Bronze medal | Jean-François Marceau (CAN) |

=== Half-Middleweight (– 81 kg) ===
| Rank | Name |
|---|---|
| Gold medal | Flávio Canto (BRA) |
| Silver medal | Gabriel Arteaga (CUB) |
| Bronze medal | Ariel Sganga (ARG) |
| Bronze medal | Mario Valles (COL) |

=== Middleweight (– 90 kg) ===
| Rank | Name |
|---|---|
| Gold medal | Brian Olson (USA) |
| Silver medal | Keith Morgan (CAN) |
| Bronze medal | Yosvany Despaigne (CUB) |
| Bronze medal | Carlos Honorato (BRA) |

=== Half-Heavyweight (– 100 kg) ===
| Rank | Name |
|---|---|
| Gold medal | Mário Sabino (BRA) |
| Silver medal | Nicolas Gill (CAN) |
| Bronze medal | Michael Barnes (USA) |
| Bronze medal | Oreidis Despaigne (CUB) |

=== Heavyweight (+ 100 kg) ===
| Rank | Name |
|---|---|
| Gold medal | Daniel Hernandes (BRA) |
| Silver medal | Joel Brutus (HAI) |
| Bronze medal | Martin Boonzaayer (USA) |
| Bronze medal | Rigoberto Trujillo (CUB) |

== Women's competition ==
=== Extra-Lightweight (– 48 kg) ===
| Rank | Name |
|---|---|
| Gold medal | Danieska Carrion (CUB) |
| Silver medal | Carolyne Lepage (CAN) |
| Bronze medal | Lisseth Orozco (COL) |
| Bronze medal | Analy Rodríguez (VEN) |

=== Half-Lightweight (– 52 kg) ===
| Rank | Name |
|---|---|
| Gold medal | Amarilis Savón (CUB) |
| Silver medal | Charlee Minkin (USA) |
| Bronze medal | Fabiane Hukuda (BRA) |
| Bronze medal | Flor Velázquez (VEN) |

=== Lightweight (– 57 kg) ===
| Rank | Name |
|---|---|
| Gold medal | Yurisleidy Lupetey (CUB) |
| Silver medal | Rudymar Fleming (VEN) |
| Bronze medal | Tânia Ferreira (BRA) |
| Bronze medal | Ellen Wilson (USA) |

=== Half-Middleweight (– 63 kg) ===
| Rank | Name |
|---|---|
| Gold medal | Driulys González (CUB) |
| Silver medal | Vânia Ishii (BRA) |
| Bronze medal | Daniela Krukower (ARG) |
| Bronze medal | Isabelle Pearson (CAN) |

=== Middleweight (– 70 kg) ===
| Rank | Name |
|---|---|
| Gold medal | Regla Leyén (CUB) |
| Silver medal | Christina Yannetsos (USA) |
| Bronze medal | Diana Chalá (ECU) |
| Bronze medal | Dulce Pina (DOM) |

=== Half-Heavyweight (– 78 kg) ===
| Rank | Name |
|---|---|
| Gold medal | Edinanci Silva (BRA) |
| Silver medal | Yurisel Laborde (CUB) |
| Bronze medal | Amy Cotton (CAN) |
| Bronze medal | Keivi Pinto (VEN) |

=== Heavyweight (+ 78 kg) ===
| Rank | Name |
|---|---|
| Gold medal | Daima Beltrán (CUB) |
| Silver medal | Giovanna Blanco (VEN) |
| Bronze medal | Olia Berger (CAN) |
| Bronze medal | Carmen Chalá (ECU) |
