= Luciano Corrêa =

Brazilian judoka (born 1982)

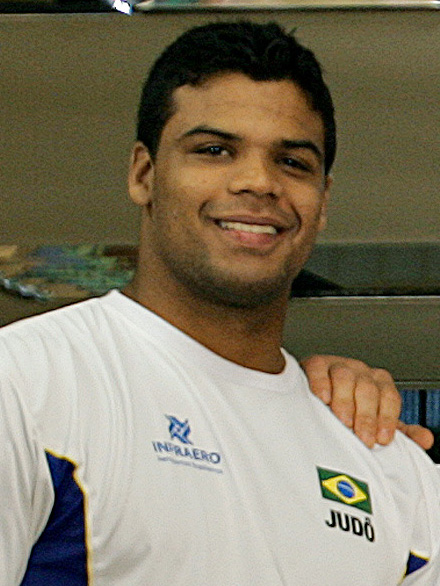

Personal information
- Full name: Luciano Ribeiro Corrêa
- Nationality: Brazilian
- Born: 25 November 1982 (age 43) Brasília, DF
- Occupation: Judoka

Sport
- Country: Brazil
- Sport: Judo
- Weight class: ‍–‍100 kg

Achievements and titles
- Olympic Games: R16 (2012)
- World Champ.: (2007)
- Pan American Champ.: (2005, 2009)
Medal record
Men's judo
Representing Brazil
World Championships
Gold medal – first place	2007 Rio de Janeiro	‍–‍100 kg
Bronze medal – third place	2005 Cairo	‍–‍100 kg
Pan American Games
Gold medal – first place	2011 Guadalajara	‍–‍100 kg
Gold medal – first place	2015 Toronto	‍–‍100 kg
Bronze medal – third place	2007 Rio de Janeiro	‍–‍100 kg
Pan American Championships
Gold medal – first place	2005 Caguas	‍–‍100 kg
Gold medal – first place	2009 Buenos Aires	Open
Silver medal – second place	2014 Guayaquil	‍–‍100 kg
Silver medal – second place	2015 Edmonton	‍–‍100 kg
Bronze medal – third place	2002 Santo Domingo	‍–‍100 kg
Bronze medal – third place	2009 Buenos Aires	‍–‍100 kg
Bronze medal – third place	2013 San José	‍–‍100 kg
Bronze medal – third place	2016 Havana	‍–‍100 kg
IJF Grand Slam
Gold medal – first place	2010 Moscow	‍–‍100 kg
Silver medal – second place	2009 Moscow	‍–‍100 kg
Silver medal – second place	2009 Rio de Janeiro	‍–‍100 kg
Silver medal – second place	2016 Abu Dhabi	‍–‍100 kg
Bronze medal – third place	2008 Tokyo	‍–‍100 kg
Bronze medal – third place	2013 Moscow	‍–‍100 kg
IJF Grand Prix
Gold medal – first place	2014 Düsseldorf	‍–‍100 kg
Bronze medal – third place	2010 Düsseldorf	‍–‍100 kg
Pan American Junior Championships
Gold medal – first place	2001 Acapulco	‍–‍100 kg
Summer Universiade
Bronze medal – third place	2003 Jeju	‍–‍100 kg
Bronze medal – third place	2003 Jeju	Open
Military World Games
Gold medal – first place	2015 Mungyeong	Team

Profile at external databases
- IJF: 434
- JudoInside.com: 15371
- Updated on 19 November 2022

Luciano Ribeiro Corrêa (born 25 November 1982) is a Brazilian judoka, who competes in the ‍–‍100 kg (half heavyweight) category. He was world champion in the 2007 World Judo Championships.

As well as this, Corrêa has won a bronze at the World Judo Championships (2005), and has represented his country at the 2008 and 2012 Summer Olympics.

== Achievements ==
Year	Tournament	Place	Weight class
2007	World Judo Championships	1st	Half heavyweight (100 kg)
2007	Pan American Games	3rd	Half heavyweight (100 kg)
2005	World Judo Championships	3rd	Half heavyweight (100 kg)
2005	Pan American Judo Championships	1st	Half heavyweight (100 kg)
2003	Universiade	3rd	Half heavyweight (100 kg)
2003	Universiade	3rd	Open class
2002	Pan American Judo Championships	3rd	Half heavyweight (100 kg)
