= Judo at the 2011 Pan American Games =

Judo Judo at the 2011 Pan American Games
- Venue: CODE II Gymnasium
- Location: Guadalajara, Jalisco, Mexico
- Dates: October 26 – October 29
- Competitors: 136 from 17 nations

Competition at external databases
- Links: JudoInside

Judo at the 2011 Pan American Games in Guadalajara was held from 26 to 29 October at the CODE II Gymnasium.

== Medal summary ==
=== Medal table ===
* Host nation (Mexico)

Rank	Nation	Gold	Silver	Bronze	Total
1	Brazil	6	3	4	13
2	Cuba	6	3	3	12
3	United States	1	1	6	8
4	Argentina	1	1	2	4
5	Mexico*	0	2	3	5
6	Puerto Rico	0	2	2	4
7	Canada	0	1	5	6
8	Colombia	0	1	1	2
9	Peru	0	0	1	1
9	Venezuela	0	0	1	1
Totals (10 entries)		14	14	28	56

=== Men's events ===
Event	Gold	Silver	Bronze
Extra-lightweight (60 kg)	Felipe Kitadai; Brazil	Nabor Castillo; Mexico	Juan Postigos; Peru
Extra-lightweight (60 kg)	Felipe Kitadai; Brazil	Nabor Castillo; Mexico	Aaron Kunihiro; United States
Half-lightweight (66 kg)	Leandro Cunha; Brazil	Kenneth Hashimoto; United States	Anyelo Gomez; Cuba
Half-lightweight (66 kg)	Leandro Cunha; Brazil	Kenneth Hashimoto; United States	Ricardo Valderrama; Venezuela
Lightweight (73 kg)	Bruno Mendonça; Brazil	Alejandro Clara; Argentina	Nicholas Tritton; Canada
Lightweight (73 kg)	Bruno Mendonça; Brazil	Alejandro Clara; Argentina	Ronald Girones; Cuba
Half-middleweight (81 kg)	Leandro Guilheiro; Brazil	Gadiel Miranda; Puerto Rico	Antoine Valois-Fortier; Canada
Half-middleweight (81 kg)	Leandro Guilheiro; Brazil	Gadiel Miranda; Puerto Rico	Emmanuel Lucenti; Argentina
Middleweight (90 kg)	Tiago Camilo; Brazil	Asley González; Cuba	Alexandre Emond; Canada
Middleweight (90 kg)	Tiago Camilo; Brazil	Asley González; Cuba	Isao Cardenas; Mexico
Half-heavyweight (100 kg)	Luciano Corrêa; Brazil	Oreidis Despaigne; Cuba	Cristian Schmidt; Argentina
Half-heavyweight (100 kg)	Luciano Corrêa; Brazil	Oreidis Despaigne; Cuba	Sergio García; Mexico
Heavyweight (+100 kg)	Óscar Brayson; Cuba	Rafael Silva; Brazil	Anthony Turner; United States
Heavyweight (+100 kg)	Óscar Brayson; Cuba	Rafael Silva; Brazil	Pablo Figueroa; Puerto Rico

=== Women's events ===
Event	Gold	Silver	Bronze
Extra-lightweight (48 kg)	Paula Pareto; Argentina	Dayaris Mestre Álvarez; Cuba	Angela Woosley; United States
Extra-lightweight (48 kg)	Paula Pareto; Argentina	Dayaris Mestre Álvarez; Cuba	Sarah Menezes; Brazil
Half-lightweight (52 kg)	Yanet Bermoy; Cuba	Érika Miranda; Brazil	Angelica Delgado; United States
Half-lightweight (52 kg)	Yanet Bermoy; Cuba	Érika Miranda; Brazil	Yulieth Sánchez; Colombia
Lightweight (57 kg)	Yurisleidy Lupetey; Cuba	Rafaela Silva; Brazil	Joliane Melançon; Canada
Lightweight (57 kg)	Yurisleidy Lupetey; Cuba	Rafaela Silva; Brazil	Hana Carmichael; United States
Half-middleweight (63 kg)	Yaritza Abel; Cuba	Karina Acosta; Mexico	Christal Ransom; United States
Half-middleweight (63 kg)	Yaritza Abel; Cuba	Karina Acosta; Mexico	Stéfanie Tremblay; Canada
Middleweight (70 kg)	Onix Cortés; Cuba	Yuri Alvear; Colombia	María Pérez; Puerto Rico
Middleweight (70 kg)	Onix Cortés; Cuba	Yuri Alvear; Colombia	Maria Portela; Brazil
Half-heavyweight (78 kg)	Kayla Harrison; United States	Catherine Roberge; Canada	Yalennis Castillo; Cuba
Half-heavyweight (78 kg)	Kayla Harrison; United States	Catherine Roberge; Canada	Mayra Aguiar; Brazil
Heavyweight (+78 kg)	Idalys Ortiz; Cuba	Melissa Mojica; Puerto Rico	Maria Suelen Altheman; Brazil
Heavyweight (+78 kg)	Idalys Ortiz; Cuba	Melissa Mojica; Puerto Rico	Vanessa Zambotti; Mexico

== Schedule ==
All times are Central Daylight Time (UTC−5).

Day	Date	Start	Finish	Event	Phase
Day 13	Wednesday October 26, 2011	11:00	13:00	Men's 100, +100, Women's +78 kg	Preliminaries
Day 13	Wednesday October 26, 2011	17:00	19:10	Men's 100, +100, Women's +78 kg	'Finals
Day 14	Thursday October 27, 2011	11:00	13:00	Men's 81, 90, Women's 70, 78 kg	Preliminaries
Day 14	Thursday October 27, 2011	17:00	19:10	Men's 81, 90, Women's 70, 78 kg	Finals
Day 15	Friday October 28, 2011	11:00	13:00	Men's 66, 73, Women's 57, 63 kg	Preliminaries
Day 15	Friday October 28, 2011	17:00	19:10	Men's 66, 73, Women's 57, 63 kg	Finals
Day 16	Saturday October 29, 2011	11:00	13:00	Men's 60 Women's 48, 52 kg	Preliminaries
Day 16	Saturday October 29, 2011	17:00	19:10	Men's 60 Women's 48, 52 kg	Finals

== Qualification ==
140 (10 per weight class) athletes will qualify to compete in judo. The top ten nations after a series of qualification tournaments will qualify. If Mexico fails to be in the top ten it will take the place of the tenth place country.

NOC	Men							Women							Total
NOC	-60kg	-66kg	-73kg	-81kg	-90kg	-100kg	+100kg	-48kg	-52kg	-57kg	-63kg	-70kg	-78kg	+78kg	Total
Argentina			X	X	X	X	X	X	X	X	X		X	X	11
Brazil	X	X	X	X	X	X	X	X	X	X	X	X	X	X	14
Canada	X	X	X	X	X	X			X	X	X	X	X		11
Chile		X	X	X	X			X		X					6
Colombia	X		X		X	X	X	X	X	X	X	X	X		11
Cuba	X	X	X	X	X	X	X	X	X	X	X	X	X	X	14
Ecuador	X	X						X		X		X	X	X	7
El Salvador		X				X						X			3
Guatemala							X				X	X	X		4
Haiti									X						1
Honduras	X														1
Mexico	X	X	X	X	X	X	X	X	X	X	X	X	X	X	14
Peru	X	X		X			X	X	X						6
Puerto Rico				X		X	X				X	X		X	6
United States	X	X	X	X	X	X	X		X	X	X	X	X	X	13
Uruguay			X												1
Venezuela	X	X	X	X	X	X	X	X	X	X	X		X	X	13
Total: 17 NOCs	10	10	10	10	9	10	10	9	10	10	10	10	10	8	136
