= Lisseth Orozco =

Colombian judoka (born 1986)

Personal information
- Born: 1 September 1986 (age 40)
- Occupation: Judoka

Sport
- Sport: Judo
Medal record
Women's judo
Representing Colombia
Pan American Games
Bronze medal – third place	2003 S. Domingo	Extra Lightweight
Pan American Championships
Bronze medal – third place	2007 Montreal	–48 kg
South American Games
Gold medal – first place	2006 Buenos Aires	Extra Lightweight
Central American and Caribbean Games
Silver medal – second place	2006 Cartagena	-53 kg
Bronze medal – third place	2006 Cartagena	Team

Profile at external databases
- JudoInside.com: 27407

Lisseth Johanna Orozco Pallares (born 1 September 1986 in Cúcuta, Norte de Santander) is a female judoka from Colombia, who won the bronze medal in the women's extra lightweight division (– 48 kg) at the 2003 Pan American Games in Santo Domingo, Dominican Republic. She represented her native country at the 2004 Summer Olympics in Athens, Greece.
