= Giovanna Blanco =

Venezuelan judoka (born 1982)

Personal information
- Full name: Giovanna José Blanco Bazon
- Born: 18 December 1982 (age 43) El Tigre, Anzoátegui, Venezuela
- Occupation: Judoka

Sport
- Country: Venezuela
- Sport: Judo
- Weight class: +78 kg

Achievements and titles
- Olympic Games: R16 (2012)
- World Champ.: 7th (2003, 2005)
- Pan American Champ.: (2004, 2004, 2006)
Medal record
Women's judo
Representing Venezuela
Pan American Games
Silver medal – second place	2003 Santo Domingo	+78 kg
Pan American Championships
Gold medal – first place	2004 Isla Margarita	+78 kg
Gold medal – first place	2004 Isla Margarita	Open
Gold medal – first place	2006 Buenos Aires	Open
Silver medal – second place	2002 Santo Domingo	Open
Silver medal – second place	2006 Buenos Aires	+78 kg
Silver medal – second place	2008 Miami	+78 kg
Bronze medal – third place	2000 Orlando	+78 kg
IJF Grand Prix
Bronze medal – third place	2013 Ulaanbaatar	+78 kg
South American Games
Gold medal – first place	2006 Buenos Aires	Open
Silver medal – second place	2006 Buenos Aires	+78 kg
Central American and Caribbean Games
Gold medal – first place	2006 Cartagena	Open
Silver medal – second place	2006 Cartagena	+78 kg
Bronze medal – third place	2006 Cartagena	Team

Profile at external databases
- IJF: 4500
- JudoInside.com: 13345
- Updated on 27 December 2022

Giovanna José Blanco Bazon (born 18 December 1982) is a female judoka from Venezuela, who won the silver medal in the women's heavyweight division (+ 78 kg) at the 2003 Pan American Games in Santo Domingo, Dominican Republic.

== Career ==
Blanco won the silver medal at the 2003 Pan American Games, and represented her native country at the 2004 Summer Olympics in Athens, Greece.

She won the gold medal in the open category, silver in over 78 kg and bronze in the team competition of the 2006 Central American and Caribbean Games.

At the 2012 Summer Olympics she lost to Japanese Mika Sugimoto after only 51 seconds in the second round of the +78 kg category.
