= Driulis González =

Cuban judoka (born 1973)

Personal information
- Born: 21 September 1973 (age 53)
- Occupation: Judoka

Sport
- Country: Cuba
- Sport: Judo
- Weight class: –57 kg, –63 kg

Achievements and titles
- Olympic Games: (gold) (1996)
- World Champ.: (gold) (1995, 1999, 2007)
- Pan American Champ.: (gold) (1992, 1994, 1996, 1997, 1998, 2007, 2008)
Medal record
Women's judo
Representing Cuba
Olympic Games
Gold medal – first place	1996 Atlanta	‍–‍56 kg
Silver medal – second place	2000 Sydney	‍–‍57 kg
Bronze medal – third place	1992 Barcelona	‍–‍56 kg
Bronze medal – third place	2004 Athens	‍–‍63 kg
World Championships
Gold medal – first place	1995 Chiba	‍–‍56 kg
Gold medal – first place	1999 Birmingham	‍–‍57 kg
Gold medal – first place	2007 Rio de Janeiro	‍–‍63 kg
Silver medal – second place	1997 Paris	‍–‍56 kg
Silver medal – second place	2003 Osaka	‍–‍63 kg
Bronze medal – third place	1993 Hamilton	‍–‍56 kg
Bronze medal – third place	2005 Cairo	‍–‍63 kg
Pan American Games
Gold medal – first place	1995 Mara del Plata	‍–‍56 kg
Gold medal – first place	1999 Winnipeg	‍–‍57 kg
Gold medal – first place	2003 Santo Domingo	‍–‍63 kg
Gold medal – first place	2007 Rio de Janeiro	‍–‍63 kg
Pan American Championships
Gold medal – first place	1992 Ontario	‍–‍56 kg
Gold medal – first place	1994 Santiago	‍–‍56 kg
Gold medal – first place	1996 San Juan	‍–‍56 kg
Gold medal – first place	1997 Guadalajara	‍–‍56 kg
Gold medal – first place	1998 Santo Domingo	‍–‍57 kg
Gold medal – first place	2007 Montreal	‍–‍63 kg
Gold medal – first place	2008 Miami	‍–‍63 kg
Central American and Caribbean Games
Gold medal – first place	2006 Cartagena	‍–‍63 kg
Gold medal – first place	2006 Cartagena	Women's team
Summer Universiade
Gold medal – first place	1995 Fukuoka	‍–‍56 kg
Gold medal – first place	1999 Palma de Mallorca	‍–‍57 kg

Profile at external databases
- IJF: 16149
- JudoInside.com: 969
- Updated on 31 May 2023

Driulis González Morales (born 21 September 1973 in Guantánamo) is a Cuban judoka who has won four Olympic medals, including a gold medal in 1996. She carried the flag for her native country at the opening ceremony of the 2007 Pan American Games in Rio de Janeiro, Brazil.

Along with Australia's Mária Pekli and Japan's Ryoko Tamura-Tani, Driulis is the first female judoka to compete at five Olympics. The only other judokas to compete at five Olympics are Belgian Robert Van de Walle and Puerto Rican judoka-bobsledder Jorge Bonnet.
