= Judo at the 2008 Summer Olympics =

Judo Judo at the Games of the XXIX Olympiad
- Venue: Beijing Science and Technology University Gymnasium
- Location: Beijing, China
- Dates: 9–15 August 2008

Competition at external databases
- Links: IJF • EJU • JudoInside

Judo competitions at the 2008 Summer Olympics in Beijing were held from August 9 to August 15 at the Beijing Science and Technology University Gymnasium.

This was the fifth Olympics for Driulys González (Cuba), Mária Pekli (Australia), Ryoko Tamura-Tani (Japan). The only other judokas to compete at five Olympics are Robert Van de Walle (Belgium), the judoka-bobsledder Jorge Bonnet (Puerto Rico) and Telma Monteiro (Portugal). At Paris 2024 Teddy Riner joined this group as a 5-time Olympian.

== Medal table ==
* Host nation (China)

Rank	Nation	Gold	Silver	Bronze	Total
1	Japan	4	1	2	7
2	China*	3	0	1	4
3	South Korea	1	2	1	4
4	Azerbaijan	1	0	1	2
5	Georgia	1	0	0	1
5	Germany	1	0	0	1
5	Italy	1	0	0	1
5	Mongolia	1	0	0	1
5	Romania	1	0	0	1
10	Cuba	0	3	3	6
11	France	0	2	2	4
12	Netherlands	0	1	4	5
13	North Korea	0	1	2	3
14	Algeria	0	1	1	2
14	Uzbekistan	0	1	1	2
16	Austria	0	1	0	1
16	Kazakhstan	0	1	0	1
18	Brazil	0	0	3	3
19	Argentina	0	0	1	1
19	Egypt	0	0	1	1
19	Slovenia	0	0	1	1
19	Switzerland	0	0	1	1
19	Tajikistan	0	0	1	1
19	Ukraine	0	0	1	1
19	United States	0	0	1	1
Totals (25 entries)		14	14	28	56

== Medal summary ==
=== Men's events ===
Games	Gold	Silver	Bronze
Extra-lightweight (60 kg)	Choi Min-ho; South Korea	Ludwig Paischer; Austria	Rishod Sobirov; Uzbekistan
Extra-lightweight (60 kg)	Choi Min-ho; South Korea	Ludwig Paischer; Austria	Ruben Houkes; Netherlands
Half-lightweight (66 kg)	Masato Uchishiba; Japan	Benjamin Darbelet; France	Yordanis Arencibia; Cuba
Half-lightweight (66 kg)	Masato Uchishiba; Japan	Benjamin Darbelet; France	Pak Chol-min; North Korea
Lightweight (73 kg)	Elnur Mammadli; Azerbaijan	Wang Ki-chun; South Korea	Rasul Boqiev; Tajikistan
Lightweight (73 kg)	Elnur Mammadli; Azerbaijan	Wang Ki-chun; South Korea	Leandro Guilheiro; Brazil
Half-middleweight (81 kg)	Ole Bischof; Germany	Kim Jae-bum; South Korea	Tiago Camilo; Brazil
Half-middleweight (81 kg)	Ole Bischof; Germany	Kim Jae-bum; South Korea	Roman Gontiuk; Ukraine
Middleweight (90 kg)	Irakli Tsirekidze; Georgia	Amar Benikhlef; Algeria	Hesham Mesbah; Egypt
Middleweight (90 kg)	Irakli Tsirekidze; Georgia	Amar Benikhlef; Algeria	Sergei Aschwanden; Switzerland
Half-heavyweight (100 kg)	Naidangiin Tüvshinbayar; Mongolia	Askhat Zhitkeyev; Kazakhstan	Movlud Miraliyev; Azerbaijan
Half-heavyweight (100 kg)	Naidangiin Tüvshinbayar; Mongolia	Askhat Zhitkeyev; Kazakhstan	Henk Grol; Netherlands
Heavyweight (+100 kg)	Satoshi Ishii; Japan	Abdullo Tangriev; Uzbekistan	Teddy Riner; France
Heavyweight (+100 kg)	Satoshi Ishii; Japan	Abdullo Tangriev; Uzbekistan	Oscar Braison; Cuba

=== Women's events ===
Games	Gold	Silver	Bronze
Extra-lightweight (48 kg)	Alina Alexandra Dumitru; Romania	Yanet Bermoy; Cuba	Paula Pareto; Argentina
Extra-lightweight (48 kg)	Alina Alexandra Dumitru; Romania	Yanet Bermoy; Cuba	Ryoko Tani; Japan
Half-lightweight (52 kg)	Xian Dongmei; China	An Kum-ae; North Korea	Soraya Haddad; Algeria
Half-lightweight (52 kg)	Xian Dongmei; China	An Kum-ae; North Korea	Misato Nakamura; Japan
Lightweight (57 kg)	Giulia Quintavalle; Italy	Deborah Gravenstijn; Netherlands	Xu Yan; China
Lightweight (57 kg)	Giulia Quintavalle; Italy	Deborah Gravenstijn; Netherlands	Ketleyn Quadros; Brazil
Half-middleweight (63 kg)	Ayumi Tanimoto; Japan	Lucie Décosse; France	Elisabeth Willeboordse; Netherlands
Half-middleweight (63 kg)	Ayumi Tanimoto; Japan	Lucie Décosse; France	Won Ok-Im; North Korea
Middleweight (70 kg)	Masae Ueno; Japan	Anaysi Hernández; Cuba	Ronda Rousey; United States
Middleweight (70 kg)	Masae Ueno; Japan	Anaysi Hernández; Cuba	Edith Bosch; Netherlands
Half-heavyweight (78 kg)	Yang Xiuli; China	Yalennis Castillo; Cuba	Jeong Gyeong-mi; South Korea
Half-heavyweight (78 kg)	Yang Xiuli; China	Yalennis Castillo; Cuba	Stéphanie Possamaï; France
Heavyweight (+78 kg)	Tong Wen; China	Maki Tsukada; Japan	Idalys Ortiz; Cuba
Heavyweight (+78 kg)	Tong Wen; China	Maki Tsukada; Japan	Lucija Polavder; Slovenia

== Qualification ==
Together with 366 directly qualified athletes, there were 20 invitational places from a Tripartite Commission (genders and categories are yet to be decided), making up a total athlete quota of 386 athletes—217 men, 147 women and 22 places not yet allocated to a gender.

An NOC may enter up to one athlete per weight category. The qualifying places were allocated as follows:

Event/Union	Date	Location	Men	Women	Totals
World Championships	September 13–16, 2007	(Brazil) Rio de Janeiro	6	6	84
African Judo Union	May 2006 – May 2008	—	3	2	35
Judo Union of Asia	Nov 2006 – Apr 2008	—	5	3	58^{[a]}
European Judo Union	Apr 2007 – Apr 2008	—	9	5	98
Oceania Judo Union	Sep 2007 – Mar 2008	—	1	1	14
Pan American Judo Union	May 2006 – May 2008	—	6	3	63
Host Nation (CHN)	—	—	1	1	14^{[b]}
TOTAL			31	21	366

^{a} Two additional places are awarded to this union, but gender and weight categories are to be defined.

^{b} If the host nation qualified athletes directly through the world championships or Asian continental qualification system, the reserved entry places were reallocated as part of the Asian continental qualification.

Continental qualification places were allocated through the ranking system based on the major tournaments on the continent (continental championships, qualification tournaments). More important tournaments and tournaments closer to the Olympics carried more points. Deadline for the unions to confirm the places was May 21, 2008.

== See also ==
- Judo at the 2008 Summer Paralympics
