= José Camacho (judoka) =

Venezuelan judoka (born 1983)

Personal information
- Full name: José Gregorio Camacho Lascarro
- Nationality: Venezuela
- Born: 26 April 1983 (age 43) Barinas, Barinas, Venezuela
- Height: 1.72 m (5 ft 7 1/2 in)
- Weight: 90 kg (198 lb)

Sport
- Sport: Judo
- Event: 90 kg
Medal record
Men's judo
Representing Venezuela
Pan American Games
Bronze medal – third place	2007 Rio de Janeiro	90 kg
Pan American Championships
Silver medal – second place	2007 Montreal	90 kg
Bronze medal – third place	2006 Buenos Aires	90 kg
Bronze medal – third place	2011 Guadalajara	90 kg

José Gregorio Camacho Lascarro (born April 26, 1983 in Barinas) is a Venezuelan judoka, who played for the middleweight category. He is a two-time Olympian, a three-time medalist at the Pan American Judo Championships, and a bronze medalist for his division at the 2007 Pan American Games in Rio de Janeiro, Brazil.

== Career ==
Camacho made his official debut for the 2004 Summer Olympics in Athens, where he lost the first preliminary match of men's middleweight class (90 kg), with an ippon and a kuchiki-taoshi (single leg takedown), to Argentina's Eduardo Costa.

At the 2008 Summer Olympics in Beijing, Camacho competed for the second time in men's 90 kg class. Unlike his previous Olympics, Camacho defeated Ukraine's Valentyn Grekov in the first preliminary round, before losing out his next match, with an ippon and a tomoe nage (circle throw) to Pan American judo champion Eduardo Santos of Brazil.
