= Keivi Pinto =

Venezuelan judoka (born 1979)

Personal information
- Born: December 26, 1979 (age 46)
- Occupation: Judoka

Sport
- Sport: Judo
Medal record
Women's Judo
Representing Venezuela
Pan American Games
Bronze medal – third place	2003	Half Heavyweight
Central American and Caribbean Games
Bronze medal – third place	2006 Cartagena	-78 kg
Bronze medal – third place	2006 Cartagena	Team

Profile at external databases
- JudoInside.com: 15925

Keivi Mayerlin Pinto (born December 26, 1979) is a female judoka from Venezuela, who won the bronze medal in the women's half heavyweight division (– 78 kg) at the 2003 Pan American Games in Santo Domingo, Dominican Republic.

== Career ==
She represented her native country at the 2004 Summer Olympics in Athens, Greece. Pinto won the bronze medal of the under 78 kg division of the 2006 Central American and Caribbean Games.
