= 2006 World Team Judo Championships – Women's team =

Judo competition

Judo Women's team at the 2006 World Team Judo Championships
- Venue: Bercy
- Location: Paris, France
- Dates: 16 September 2006
- Nations: 12

Medalists
gold medal	France (1st title)
silver medal	Cuba
bronze medal	Japan
bronze medal	China

Competition at external databases
- Links: JudoInside

The women's team competition at the 2006 World Team Judo Championships was held on 16 September at the Bercy in Paris, France.

== Results ==
Round of 16
South Korea	7 (65)
Hungary	0 (0)
Turkey	0 (0)
China	7 (60)
Oceania	1 (5)
Slovenia	5 (42)
Japan	6 (60)
United States	1 (7)

Quarter-finals
South Korea	0 (0)
Cuba	5 (30)
Great Britain	0 (0)
China	7 (70)
France	5 (45)
Slovenia	1 (10)
Russia	2 (12)
Japan	5 (45)

Semi-finals
Cuba	5 (35)
China	1 (10)
France	4 (33)
Japan	2 (15)

Final
Cuba	0 (0)
France	4 (23)

=== Repechage ===
Repechage 1
Turkey	3 (27)
Great Britain	3 (25)

Repechage 2
South Korea	4 (40)
Turkey	3 (25)

Third place
South Korea	0 (0)
Japan	4 (33)

Repechage 1
United States	2 (20)
Russia	5 (50)

Repechage 2
Slovenia	3 (30)
Russia	3 (24)

Third place
Slovenia	0 (0)
China	7 (57)
