= Modesto Lara =

Dominican judoka (born 1973)

Personal information
- Born: October 29, 1973 (age 52)
- Occupation: Judoka

Sport
- Sport: Judo
Medal record
Men's Judo
Representing the Dominican Republic
Pan American Games
Silver medal – second place	2003 Santo Domingo	Extra Lightweight
Central American and Caribbean Games
Bronze medal – third place	2006 Cartagena	-60 kg

Profile at external databases
- JudoInside.com: 16043

Modesto Lara Arias (born October 29, 1973) is a male judoka from the Dominican Republic, who won the silver medal in the men's extra lightweight division (– 60 kg) at the 2003 Pan American Games in Santo Domingo, Dominican Republic. He represented his native country at the 2004 Summer Olympics in Athens, Greece.
