= Teófilo Diek =

Dominican judoka (born 1987)

Personal information
- Full name: Teófilo Antonio Diek Andon
- Nationality: Dominican Republic
- Born: 13 December 1987 (age 38)
- Occupation: Judoka
- Height: 1.83 m (6 ft 0 in)
- Weight: 100 kg (220 lb)

Sport
- Sport: Judo
- Event: 100 kg
- Club: Club Deportivo Naco
- Coached by: Juan Chalas
Medal record
Men's judo
Representing Dominican Republic
Pan American Games
Bronze medal – third place	2007 Rio de Janeiro	100 kg
Central American and Caribbean Games
Silver medal – second place	2006 Cartagena	-100 kg
Bronze medal – third place	2006 Cartagena	Team

Profile at external databases
- JudoInside.com: 36298

Teófilo Antonio Diek Andon (born December 13, 1987) is a Dominican judoka, who played for the half-heavyweight category. He won the bronze medal for the same division at the 2007 Pan American Games in Rio de Janeiro, Brazil.

Diek represented the Dominican Republic at the 2008 Summer Olympics in Beijing, where he competed for the men's half-heavyweight class (100 kg). He received a bye for the second preliminary match, before losing out by an automatic ippon to thirty-four-year-old Canadian judoka Keith Morgan.
