= Joel Brutus =

Haitian judoka (born 1974)

Personal information
- Born: August 12, 1974 (age 51)
Medal record
Men's Judo
Representing Haiti
Pan American Games
Silver medal – second place	2003 Santo Domingo	Heavyweight
Bronze medal – third place	2007 Rio de Janeiro	Heavyweight
Central American and Caribbean Games
Silver medal – second place	2006 Cartagena	Open
Bronze medal – third place	2006 Cartagena	+100 kg

Joel Brutus (born August 12, 1974) is a Haitian judoka, who won the silver medal in the men's heavyweight division (+ 100 kg) at the 2003 Pan American Games. He represented his native country at two consecutive Summer Olympics, starting in 2004 in Athens, Greece. Brutus carried the Haitian flag at the opening ceremony of the 2008 Summer Olympics in Beijing, PR China.
