= Javier Guédez =

Venezuelan judoka (born 1982)

Personal information
- Born: October 15, 1982 (age 43)
- Occupation: Judoka

Sport
- Sport: Judo
Medal record
Men's Judo
Representing Venezuela
Pan American Games
Bronze medal – third place	2007 Rio de Janeiro	-60 kg
Central American and Caribbean Games
Gold medal – first place	2006 Cartagena	-60 kg
Gold medal – first place	2010 Mayaguez	-60 kg
South American Games
Silver medal – second place	2006 Buenos Aires	-60 kg

Profile at external databases
- JudoInside.com: 15896

Javier Antonio Guédez Sánchez (born October 15, 1982) is a male judoka from Venezuela. He won the bronze medal in the extra lightweight division (– 60 kg) at the 2007 Pan American Games in Rio de Janeiro, Brazil. He represented his native country at the 2008 Summer Olympics in Beijing, PR China and the 2012 Olympic Games in London.
