= Ludwig Ortiz =

Venezuelan judoka (born 1976)

Personal information
- Born: February 23, 1976 (age 50)
- Occupation: Judoka

Sport
- Sport: Judo
Medal record
Men's judo
Representing Venezuela
Pan American Games
Silver medal – second place	1999 Winnipeg	Half Lightweight
Silver medal – second place	2003 Santo Domingo	Half Lightweight
Bronze medal – third place	2007 Rio de Janeiro	Half Lightweight
South American Games
Bronze medal – third place	2006 Buenos Aires	Half Lightweight

Profile at external databases
- IJF: 5991
- JudoInside.com: 30940

Ludwing Manuel Ortiz Florez (born February 23, 1976) is a male judoka from Venezuela, who twice won the silver medal in the men's half lightweight division (– 66 kg) at the Pan American Games (1999 and 2003). He represented his native country in three consecutive Summer Olympics, starting in 2000.
