= Pan American Judo Championships =

Judo competition

- Current event or competition: 2026 Pan American Judo Championships

Competition details
- Discipline: Judo
- Type: Annual
- Organiser: PJC

History
- First edition: Havana 1952
- Editions: 51
- Most recent: Panama City 2026

The Pan American Judo Championships are continental judo championships organized by the Pan American Judo Confederation since 2009. Previous championships were organized by the Panamerican Judo Union. From 2022 to 2025 they were renamed to Pan American-Oceania Judo Championships.

== Editions ==
The 2009 Pan American Judo Championships (PJU) in Santo Domingo, Dominican Republic was an unofficial championships by the IJF.

Editions
Year	Edition	Host City	Country	Events
Organized by the Pan American Judo Union
1952	1	Havana	Cuba	4
1956	2	Havana	Cuba	6
1958	3	Rio de Janeiro	Brazil	4
1960	4	Mexico City	Mexico	5
1965	5	Guatemala City	Guatemala	4
1968	6	San Juan	Puerto Rico	6
1970	7	Londrina	Brazil	6
1972	8	Buenos Aires	Argentina	6
1974	9	Panama City	Panama	6
1976	10	Maracaibo	Venezuela	6
1978	11	Buenos Aires	Argentina	8
1980	12	Isla Margarita	Venezuela	16
1982	13	Santiago	Chile	16
1984	14	Mexico City	Mexico	15
1985	15	Havana	Cuba	16
1986	16	Salinas	Puerto Rico	15
1988	17	Buenos Aires	Argentina	18
1990	18	Caracas	Venezuela	17
1992	19	Hamilton	Canada	16
1994	20	Santiago	Chile	16
1996	21	San Juan	Puerto Rico	16
1997	22	Guadalajara	Mexico	16
1998	23	Santo Domingo	Dominican Republic	16
1999	24	Montevideo	Uruguay	16
2000	25	Orlando	United States	17
2001	26	Córdoba	Argentina	18
2002	27	Santo Domingo	Dominican Republic	18
2003	28	Salvador	Brazil	18
2004	29	Isla Margarita	Venezuela	18
2005	30	Caguas	Puerto Rico	18
2006	31	Buenos Aires	Argentina	18
2007	32	Montreal	Canada	18
2008	33	Miami	United States	18
Organized by the Pan American Judo Confederation
2009	34	Buenos Aires	Argentina	18
2010	35	San Salvador	El Salvador	18
2011	36	Guadalajara	Mexico	18
2012	37	Montreal	Canada	15
2013	38	San José	Costa Rica	16
2014	39	Guayaquil	Ecuador	16
2015	40	Edmonton	Canada	16
2016	41	Havana	Cuba	14
2017	42	Panama City	Panama	14
2018	43	San José	Costa Rica	15
2019	44	Lima	Peru	15
2020	45	Guadalajara	Mexico	15
2021	46	Guadalajara	Mexico	15
Pan American-Oceania Judo Championships
2022	47	Lima	Peru	15
2023	48	Calgary	Canada	15
2024	49	Rio de Janeiro	Brazil	15
2025	50	Santiago	Chile	15
Pan American Judo Championships
2026	51	Panama City	Panama	15

== See also ==
- Judo at the Pan American Games
