= Brazilian Judo Confederation =

Judo confederation

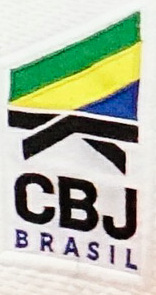
- Category: Judo
- Jurisdiction: Brazil
- Abbreviation: CBJ
- Founded: 1969
- Affiliation: IJF
- Regional affiliation: PJC
- Affiliation date: 2009
- Headquarters: Rio de Janeiro, Brazil
- President: Silvio Borges

Official website
- cbj.com.br
- (Brazil)

The Brazilian Judo Confederation (Portuguese: Confederação Brasileira de Judô (CBJ)) is the national body responsible for managing and promoting the sport of judo in Brazil, founded on 18 March 1969 and headquartered in Rio de Janeiro.

Until 2009 the CBJ was a member of the Pan American Judo Union.

The CBJ is affiliated with the International Judo Federation and the Pan American Judo Confederation since 2009.

In 2013, its president has been Paulo Wanderley Teixeira_{[pt]}.

In 2024, its president is Silvio Borges.

== Olympics ==
Updated until 2024 Summer Olympics

Year	Medal	Name	Event
1972	Bronze	Chiaki Ishii	Men's 93 kg
1984	Silver	Douglas Vieira	Men's 95 kg
1984	Bronze	Luís Onmura	Men's 71 kg
1984	Bronze	Walter Carmona	Men's 86 kg
1988	Gold	Aurélio Miguel	Men's 95 kg
1992	Gold	Rogério Sampaio	Men's 65 kg
1996	Bronze	Henrique Guimarães	Men's 65 kg
1996	Bronze	Aurélio Miguel	Men's 95 kg
2000	Silver	Tiago Camilo	Men's 73 kg
2000	Silver	Carlos Honorato	Men's 90 kg
2004	Bronze	Leandro Guilheiro	Men's 73 kg
2004	Bronze	Flávio Canto	Men's 81 kg
2008	Bronze	Leandro Guilheiro	Men's 73 kg
2008	Bronze	Tiago Camilo	Men's 81 kg
2008	Bronze	Ketleyn Quadros	Women's 57 kg
2012	Gold	Sarah Menezes	Women's 48 kg
2012	Bronze	Felipe Kitadai	Men's 60 kg
2012	Bronze	Rafael Silva	Men's +100 kg
2012	Bronze	Mayra Aguiar	Women's 78 kg
2016	Gold	Rafaela Silva	Women's 57 kg
2016	Bronze	Rafael Silva	Men's +100 kg
2016	Bronze	Mayra Aguiar	Women's 78 kg
2020	Bronze	Daniel Cargnin	Men's 66 kg
2020	Bronze	Mayra Aguiar	Women's 78 kg
2024	Gold	Beatriz Souza	Women's +78 kg
2024	Silver	Willian Lima	Men's 66 kg
2024	Bronze	Larissa Pimenta	Women's 52 kg
2024	Bronze	Willian Lima; Daniel Cargnin; Guilherme Schimidt; Rafael Macedo; Leonardo Gonçalves; Rafael Silva; Larissa Pimenta; Rafaela Silva; Ketleyn Quadros; Beatriz Souza	Mixed team

Mayra Aguiar and Rafael Silva — Brazil’s most decorated Olympic judokas, with three bronze medals each

== Titles at the World Judo Championships ==
Updated after the 2022 World Judo Championships.

Year	Name	Event
2005	João Derly	Men's 66 kg
2007	João Derly	Men's 66 kg
2007	Tiago Camilo	Men's 81 kg
2007	Luciano Corrêa	Men's 100 kg
2013	Rafaela Silva	Women's 57 kg
2014	Mayra Aguiar	Women's 78 kg
2017	Mayra Aguiar	Women's 78 kg
2022	Rafaela Silva	Women's 57 kg
2022	Mayra Aguiar	Women's 78 kg

== See also ==
- Judo in Brazil
- Brazil at the World Judo Championships
- List of judo organizations
- Judo by country
