= Judo Union of Asia =

Continental judo union

Judo Union of Asia JUA
- Sport: Judo
- Official website: thejua.org

History
- Year of formation: 1956; 70 years ago in Tokyo, Japan

Demographics
- Membership size: 39 members

Affiliations
- International federation: International Judo Federation (IJF)
- IJF member since: 1956
- Other affiliation(s): Olympic Council of Asia

Governance
- President: (Kuwait) Obaid Al-Anzi

Headquarters
- Country: Kuwait
- Secretary General: (India) Mukesh Kumar
- Official language(s): English, Japanese and Arabic

Regions
- Central Asia; Southeast Asia; East Asia; Western Asia; South Asia

The Judo Union of Asia (JUA) is the governing body of judo in Asia. It is one of the five continental confederations making up the International Judo Federation (IJF). JUA was formed in 1956 in Tokyo (Japan), with Chinese Taipei, Cambodia, Indonesia, Japan, South Korea, Philippines and Thailand being the founder members. JUA has headquarters in Kuwait and consists of 39 member federations.

== History ==
Judo Union of Asia (JUA) was established in 1956 in Tokyo, Japan with 7 national federations as founding members; Chinese Taipei, Cambodia, Indonesia, Japan, South Korea, Philippines and Thailand. The first President of JUA was Risei Kano, son of Kanō Jigorō. Risei Kano served as President of the JUA from 1956 to 1980. The organization held the first Asian Judo Championships in 1966 in Manila, Philippines, with teams from 8 member federations participating.

== Executive committee ==
Following is the JUA Executive Committee for the term 2019 – 2023.

Designation	Name	Country
President	Obaid Al-Anzi	Kuwait
General Secretary	Mukesh Kumar	India
General Treasurer	Ms. Amal Abu Shallak	United Arab Emirates
Vice-President (Southeast Zone)	Hassabodin Rojanachiva	Thailand
Vice-President (West Zone)	Sameer Sadeq Al-Mousawi	Iraq
Vice-President (Central Zone)	Kolbaev Zholdoshbek	Kyrgyzstan
Vice-President (South Zone)	Pratap Singh Bajwa	India
Vice-President (West Zone)	Lu Wei-Chen	Chinese Taipei
Vice-President 2020 Summer Olympics	Hasokawa Shinji	Japan
Vice-President 2022 Asian Games	Ms. Xian Dongmei	China
Executive Member	Eid Al-Muaikhi	Qatar
Executive Member	Enkbold Zandaakhuu	Mongolia
Advisor to President	Naser Al-Shemmiri	Kuwait

== Tournaments ==
- Asian Judo Championships
- Asian Games
- East Asian Judo Championships
- Asian Martial Arts Games (Merged to form Asian Indoor and Martial Arts Games)
- Asian Junior Judo Championships (2000)

== Members ==
Central Zone

- Kazakhstan
- Kyrgyzstan
- Tajikistan
- Turkmenistan
- Uzbekistan

Southeast Zone

- Cambodia
- Indonesia
- (Laos) Lao
- Malaysia
- Myanmar
- Philippines
- Singapore
- Thailand
- Vietnam

East Zone

- P. R. China
- Chinese Taipei
- (North Korea) DPR Korea
- Hong Kong, China
- Japan
- (South Korea) Republic of Korea
- Macau, China
- Mongolia

West Zone

- ~~I. R. Iran~~
- Iraq
- Jordan
- Kuwait
- Lebanon
- Palestine
- Qatar (since 2000)
- Saudi Arabia
- Syria
- United Arab Emirates
- Bahrain
- Yemen

Central Zone

- Bangladesh
- India
- Nepal
- Sri Lanka
- Afghanistan
- Pakistan (since 2000)
- Bhutan

^1 Iran Judo Federation was suspended by International Judo Federation since 18 September 2019, as Iranian authorities ordered their judoka Saeid Mollaei to intentionally lose in the semi-final at the 2019 World Judo Championships, so as to avoid a potential match in the finals against Israeli judoka Sagi Muki.

== See also ==
- List of judo organizations
- Judo by country
