= Ghana Judo Association =

Judo association

Ghana Judo Federation
- Jurisdiction: Ghana

Official website
- ghanajudo.com

Ghana Judo Association is the largest association for Judo in Ghana and a member as well as the official representative for this sport in the Ghana Olympic Committee.

== International competition ==
Ghana Judo Association is a member of the African umbrella organization African Judo Union (AJU) as well as the World Association for International Judo Federation (IJF).

On the part of the Ghana Olympic Committee, the Ghana Judo Association is the only Judo Association authorized to send athletes to the Olympic Games.

Emmanuel Nartey was the first Ghanaian to compete in Judo in the Olympics. Szandra Szögedi was the first female to represent Ghana.

In 2002 the president was Haj Ahmadou Fatgua.

== See also ==
- List of judo organizations
- Judo by country
