= Royal Moroccan Judo Federation =

Judo sports association

- Abbreviation: RMJF
- Founded: 1959
- Affiliation: IJF
- Affiliation date: 1962
- Regional affiliation: AJU
- Affiliation date: 1961
- Headquarters: Mohammed V Sports Complex Casablanca

The Royal Moroccan Judo Federation is a sports association founded in 1959 in Morocco, replacing the Moroccan Judo League, created in 1951. Its role is to promote judo in the kingdom and to represent the colors of Morocco in international competitions.

RMJF has been affiliated with the International Judo Federation since 1962, was a founding member of the African Judo Union in 1961 and has been part of the Arab Judo Union since 1977.

== See also ==
- List of judo organizations
- Judo by country
