= Kosovo Judo Federation =

Official governing body for the sport of judo in Kosovo

- Sport: Judo
- Membership: 16 clubs
- Affiliation: IJF
- Affiliation date: 2012
- Regional affiliation: EJU
- Affiliation date: 2012

Official website
- kosovajudo.com
- (Kosovo)

The Kosovo Judo Federation (Albanian: Federata e Xhudos së Kosovës or FXhK) is the official governing body for the sport of judo in Kosovo. In 2012, it was accepted into the International Judo Federation and the European Judo Union.

== Judo in Kosovo ==
As of June 2020, there were 16 member clubs including 813 male and 263 female judoka.

== See also ==
- List of judo organizations
- Judo by country
