= Romanian Judo Federation =

- Sport: Judo
- Abbreviation: FRJ
- Founded: May 21, 1968
- Affiliation: IJF
- Regional affiliation: EJU

Official website
- www.frjudo.ro
- (Romania)

The Romanian Judo Federation represents the Romania internationally and is a member of the International Judo Federation and the European Judo Union.

== History ==
Judo in Romania began with Heishichi Ishiguro, Japanese judoka, journalist and diplomat. Ishiguro taught judo in college for one year: ONEF (Oficiul National de Educatie Fizica [English: National Office of Physical Education]).The best student was Emilian Teacă, a police captain. In 1937 the first Romanian Police Officer Championship took place in Bucharest with the participation of other students and fire-fighters from Cîmpina. An absolute (open) class was the only weight class.

Romanian Judo began a sustained expansion after the Second World War. Mihai Botez created the first Judo team section in Arad with the creation of sports club "Vagonul Arad". In the 1960s, professionals worked to create an independent Romanian Judo Federation. The first solidifying step was the creation of the Bucharest Commission for Judo within the framework of urban physical education and sports committee in 1962.

In 1962, the first international individual competition took place between French Team FSGT and the Romania national team in Bucharest. The first Team competition took place in Medias in 1967 at the local football stadium.

On 21 May 1968 the Romanian Judo Federation was established named FRJ. The first coach training session was held by Takesse Matusaka and Sheizi Shinomaki. In the spring of 1969 the first Romanian international championships were held.

The first Romanian medal at a senior European Championship was a bronze medal at Ludwigshafen in 1977; won by Árpád Szabo -60 kg. The Romanian men's team reached third place. This initial success was largely attributable to Korean Han Chan-He's work.

== Firsts ==
- First European Judo champion from Romania was Vlad Nicoale -71 kg became champion in Vienna at the European Judo Championships 1980.
- First World championship medal (silver) won by Constantin Niculae -65 kg in Maastricht in 1981 at the World Judo Championships.
- Inaugural Olympic medals were two bronze medals from Mircea Frăţica -78 kg and Mihai Cioc Open weight category at the Los Angeles 1984 Summer Olympics.
- First World Champion was Alexandru Lungu +95 kg at World Judo Junior Championships in Cairo 1994.
- At Females first Romanian female European Judo Championships medalist silver medal for Simona Richter Birmingham 1995 Open weight.
- First Olympic Champion Alina Dumitru 48 kg Beijing 2008 Summer Olympics
- Club Championship first-place for Judo Club Liberty Oradea in 1999 at European Championship for Clubs.
- Iulian Surla and Aurelian Fleisz are European Kata Judo Championships 2011 in Prague.
- Marius Vizer was born in Tenke (Tinca) Romania and between 2000 and 2007 was president of EJU from 2007 until present is president of IJF.

== See also ==
- List of judo organizations
- Judo by country
