= Hungarian Judo Association =

Judo Association

- Sport: Judo
- Jurisdiction: Hungary
- Abbreviation: MJSZ
- Founded: 1957
- Affiliation: IJF
- Headquarters: Budapest
- President: László Tóth

Official website
- www.judo.hu
- (Hungary)

Hungarian Judo Association (Hungarian: Magyar Judo Szövetség, MJSZ) is the governing body for the sport of judo in Hungary.

== International competitions in Hungary ==
World Championships:

- 2017 World Judo Championships – Budapest, 28 August – 3 September

European Championships:

- 1981 European Judo Championships – Debrecen, 14–17 May
- 2013 European Judo Championships – Budapest, 25–28 April

== International achievements ==
Event	Gold medal	Silver medal	Bronze medal	Pos.
Olympic Games	1	3	5	21st
World Championships	2	7	15	24th
European Championships	17	28	45	13th

=== Olympic Games ===
Year	Host city	No. of judokas	Gold	Silver	Bronze	Total	
1972	(West Germany) Munich	5	0	0	0	0	-
1976	(Canada) Montreal	6	0	0	1	1	VII.
1980	(Soviet Union) Moscow	8	0	0	2	2	XI.
1988	(South Korea) Seoul	7	0	0	0	0	-
1992	(Spain) Barcelona	12	1	2	1	4	V.
1996	(United States) Atlanta	7	0	0	0	0	-
2000	(Australia) Sydney	6	0	0	0	0	-
2004	(Greece) Athens	2	0	0	0	0	-
2008	(China) Beijing	6	0	0	0	0	-
2012	(United Kingdom) London	8	0	1	1	2	XIII.
2016	(Brazil) Rio de Janeiro	8					
2020	(Japan) Tokyo						
Total			1	3	5	9	XXI.

=== World Championships ===
Year	Host city	Gold	Silver	Bronze	Total	
1979	(France) Paris	0	0	1	1	VIII.
1981	(Netherlands) Maastricht	0	0	1	1	XII.
1983	(Soviet Union) Moscow	0	1	1	2	IV.
1985	(South Korea) Seoul	0	0	1	1	XI.
1987	(West Germany) Essen	0	0	1	1	XV.
1991	(Spain) Barcelona	0	0	1	1	XV.
1993	(Canada) Hamilton	1	1	0	2	VII.
2001	(Germany) Munich	0	1	0	1	XV.
2005	(Egypt) Cairo	1	0	1	2	VIII.
2007	(Brazil) Rio de Janeiro	0	0	4	4	XIX.
2009	(Netherlands) Rotterdam	0	1	2	3	XIII.
2010	(Japan) Tokyo	0	1	0	1	X.
2011	(France) Paris	0	0	2	2	XIII.
2014	(Russia) Chelyabinsk	0	1	0	1	XII.
Total		2	7	15	24	XXIV.

=== European Championships ===
Year	Host city	Gold	Silver	Bronze	Total	
1962	(West Germany) Essen	0	0	1	1	IX.
1971	(Sweden) Gothenburg	0	0	1	1	VIII.
1972	(Netherlands) Voorburg	0	0	1	1	V.
1974	(United Kingdom) London	0	0	1	1	IX.
1976	(Soviet Union) Kyiv	1	0	1	2	VII.
1977	(West Germany) Ludwigshafen	0	1	0	1	XI.
1978	(Finland) Helsinki	0	1	3	4	X.
1979	(Belgium) Brussels	0	0	2	2	XII.
1980	(Austria) Vienna	0	1	1	2	XI.
1981	(Hungary) Debrecen	0	1	2	3	XIII.
1982	(East Germany) Rostock	0	1	2	3	
1984	(Belgium) Liège	0	1	0	1	
1985	(Norway) Hamar	0	1	0	1	
1986	(Socialist Federal Republic of Yugoslavia) Belgrade	2	0	1	3	
1987	(France) Paris	0	0	1	1	
1988	(Spain) Pamplona	0	1	1	2	
1989	(Finland) Helsinki	0	1	2	3	
1990	(West Germany) Frankfurt	1	2	1	4	
1991	(Czechoslovakia) Prague	1	1	1	3	
1992	(France) Paris	0	0	1	1	
1992	(Greece) Athens	0	0	1	1	
1994	(Poland) Gdańsk	0	0	1	1	
1995	(United Kingdom) Birmingham	1	0	0	1	
1996	(Netherlands) The Hague	0	1	0	1	
1998	(Spain) Oviedo	1	0	1	2	
2000	(Poland) Wrocław	0	1	0	1	
2001	(France) Paris	0	0	1	1	
2002	(Slovenia) Maribor	1	0	0	1	
2003	(Germany) Düsseldorf	0	0	1	1	
2004	(Romania) Bucharest	0	1	0	1	
2005	(Netherlands) Rotterdam	1	1	1	3	
2006	(Finland) Tampere	0	1	0	1	
2007	(Serbia) Belgrade	1	0	0	1	
2008	(Portugal) Lisbon	0	1	2	3	
2009	(Georgia (country)) Tbilisi	1	1	1	3	
2010	(Austria) Vienna	2	3	2	7	
2011	(Turkey) Istanbul	1	2	0	3	
2012	(Russia) Chelyabinsk	1	1	1	3	
2013	(Hungary) Budapest	1	0	2	3	
2014	(France) Montpellier	1	0	4	5	
2015	(Azerbaijan) Baku	0	1	1	2	
2016	(Russia) Kazan	0	2	1	3	
Total		17	28	45	90	XIII.

== Notable judokas ==
Men's

- József Tuncsik (born 1949), European champion and Olympic medalist
- Tibor Kincses (born 1960), Olympic medalist
- András Ozsvár (born 1957), Olympic medalist
- József Csák (born 1966), European champion and Olympic medalist
- Bertalan Hajtós (born 1965), 2x European champion, Olympic and World medalist
- Antal Kovács (born 1972), Olympic and World champion
- László Tolnai, European champion
- Imre Csősz (born 1969), Olympic medalist and European champion
- Miklós Ungvári (born 1980), 3x European champion, World and Olympic medalist
- Ákos Braun (born 1978), European and World champion
- Dániel Hadfi (born 1982), European champion and World medalist

Women's

- Zsuzsa Nagy, European champion
- Anett Mészáros (born 1987), European champion and World medalist
- Abigél Joó (born 1990), 2x European champion
- Éva Csernoviczki (born 1986), 2x European champion, World and Olympic medalist

== See also ==
- List of judo organizations
- Judo by country
