= Judo South Africa =

South Africa judo governing body

- Sport: Judo
- Category: Martial art; Combat sport
- Jurisdiction: South Africa
- Abbreviation: JSA
- Founded: 1955
- Affiliation: IJF
- Regional affiliation: AJU
- Headquarters: Welkom
- Location: 31 Elizabeth Eybers Avenue, Jan Cilliers Park, Welkom 9459
- President: Themba Hlasho
- Secretary: Ina van den Heever

Official website
- www.judosa.co.za
- (South Africa)

Judo South Africa (JSA) is the governing body of Judo in South Africa, and a member of the world governing body, the International Judo Federation (IJF), along with the African Judo Union. JSA is also a member of the South African Sports Confederation and Olympic Committee (SASCOC), which, alongside Sport and Recreation South Africa (SRSA) control all organised sport in South Africa.

== History ==
Judo introduction into South Africa began in 1945 by soldiers of World War II. Alec Butcher, an immigrant from Britain was among the pioneers alongside Jack Robinson for Jujitsu. Judo established itself as a national sport in 1955 through the formation of the South African Amateur Judo Association (SAAJA)

Apart from SAAJA, a rival body led by Jack Robinson emerged called South African National Amateur Judo Association (SANAJA) (sometimes referred to as South African Amateur Judo and Jujitsu Association (SANAJJA)) which received recognition by the South African government, teaching a version of Kodokan Judo. During the late 1970s and the 1980s the sport was controlled at various times by a body made up of rival members from both SAAJA and SANAJA. This body was named the South African Judo Union (SAJU). In 1992, all judo organisations in South Africa united under one association now called Judo South Africa (JSA).

== Structure ==
The national body has 14 provincial controlling bodies or associations. The main tournament organised is the annual South African Judo Championships.

== Belt Ranks ==
Judo kyu belt colors of Judo South Africa
Degree		Kyu 8	Kyu 7	Kyu 6	Kyu 5	Kyu 4	Kyu 3	Kyu 2	Kyu 1
Color	White	White-Yellow	Yellow	Yellow-Orange	Orange	Orange-Green	Green	Blue	Brown
Belt									

== See also ==
- Sport in South Africa
- List of judo organizations
- Judo by country
