= Italian Federation of Judo, Wrestling, Karate and Martial Arts =

Governing body for judo and karate in Italy

- Sport: Judo, Karate, Wrestling
- Jurisdiction: National
- Abbreviation: FIJLKAM
- Founded: 1902
- Affiliation: IJF
- Regional affiliation: EJU
- President: Giovanni Morsiani

Official website
- fijlkam.it
- (Italy)

The Italian Federation of Judo, Wrestling, Karate and Martial Arts (Italian: Federazione Italiana Judo Lotta Karate Arti Marziali (FIJLKAM) a sports organization affiliated to the Italian National Olympic Committee.

It was founded on 18 January 1902 in Milan by the Marquis Luigi Monticelli Obizzi, who was also its first president.

FIJLKAM is one of the oldest federations and is an integral part of the history of Italian sport with 3000 affiliated companies, 120,000 athletes and 3,000 technical teachers. In addition to jūdō, wrestling and karate, it runs Italian jiu-jitsu, Brazilian jiu-jitsu, aikido, jujutsu, sumo, grappling and mixed martial arts.

However, FIJLKAM delegates the management of MMA, Grappling and BJJ to FIGMMA (Italian Federation of Grappling and Mixed Martial Arts - Italian: Federazione Italiana Grappling Mixed Martial Arts).

The federation has always represented Italy, and has obtained 13 golds, 11 silvers and 20 bronzes in Olympic competitions, which enrich a vast medal collection with about 600 medals won at the Mediterranean Games, the European Championships, the World Championships and at the World Games.

The president of the federation has been for 32 years (from 1981 to 2013) Matteo Pellicone (1935-2013). From 2013 to 2024 the president has been Domenico Falcone. In December 2024 has been elected as president Giovanni Morsiani.

== Historical dates ==
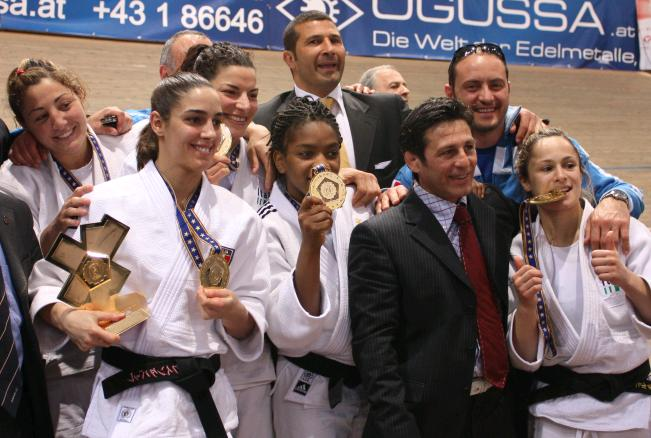
Le Azzurre in 2010

- 1902 founded with the aim of regulating wrestling and Olympic weightlifting the F.A.I. (Italian Athletics Federation)
- 1908 at the Olympics of London the athlete of F.A.I., the wrestler Enrico Porro, wins the first Italian Olympic medal
- 1931 the F.A.I. absorbs the Italian Federation of Japanese Struggle (born in 1924)
- 1933 the F.A.I. and becomes F.I.A.P. (Italian Heavy Athletics Federation)
- 1974 the F.I.A.P. change name to F.I.L.P.J. (Italian Federation of Judo Weights Fighting)
- 1982 comes out the first issue of Athlon , the federal magazine
- 1992 inaugurates in Ostia the Palazzetto F.I.L.P.J.
- 1995 karate enters the F.I.L.P.J., which becomes F.I.L.P.J.K. (Italian Federation of Judo Karate Weights Fighting)
- 2000 the F.I.L.P.J.K. is divided into Italian Federation of Judo Fighting Karate Martial Arts (F.I.J.L.K.A.M.) and in the Italian Federation of Weightlifting and Physical Culture (F.I.P.C.F.)
- 2002 the F.I.J.L.K.A.M. celebrates the centenary of its foundation

== See also ==
- European Karate Federation
- World Karate Federation
- List of judo organizations
- Judo by country
