= List of Norwegian sport governing bodies =

Here is the list of Norwegian sports federations :

- Bridge : Norwegian Bridge Federation (Norsk Bridgeforbund)
- Scrabble : Norwegian Scrabble Federation (Norsk Scrabbleforbund)
- Chess : Norwegian Chess Federation (Norges Sjakkforbund)
- Judo : Norwegian Judo Federation (Norges Judoforbund)
- Golf : Norwegian Golf Federation (Norges Golfforbund)
- Swimming : Norwegian Swimming Federation (Norges Svømmeforbund)
- Handball : Norwegian Handball Federation (Norges Handballforbund)
- Football : Norwegian Football Federation (Norges Fotballforbund)
- Boxing : Norwegian Boxing Federation(Norges Bokseforbund)
- Bowling : Norwegian Bowling Federation (Norges Bowlingforbund)
- Table tennis : Norwegian Table Tennis Federation (Norges Bordtennisforbund)

== Others ==
- Norwegian Mind Sports Federation (Norsk Tankesportforbund)
