= Kano Yukimitsu =

Japanese judoka (1932–2020)

Kano Yukimitsu (27 March 1932 – 8 March 2020) was a senior administrator in judo, and was the fourth president of the Kodokan and the President of the All Japan Judo Federation. He was the son of Kano Risei and grandson of the founder of Judo Kano Jigoro. He served from 1980 to 1995 as the President of the Judo Union of Asia. He was an advocate of Kodokan Judo over the International Judo Federation.

On 9 March 2020, it was reported that he died at the age of 87.
