= German Judo Federation =

Judo federation

- Deutscher Judo-Bund e. V.
- Sport: Judo
- Jurisdiction: Germany
- Abbreviation: DJB
- Founded: 8 August 1953
- Affiliation: IJF
- Regional affiliation: EJU
- Headquarters: Frankfurt, Germany
- President: Peter Frese

Official website
- judobund.de

The German Judo Federation (German: Deutscher Judo-Bund e.V. (DJB)) is an association of German judo. The German Judo Federation is affiliated with the International Judo Federation. Its headquarters are in Frankfurt/Main.

== History ==
The judo sport in West Germany was organized as a sport from 1949 to 1954 in the Deutscher Athletenbund (DAB). On 8 August 1953 the German Judo Association was founded by Dan-bearers of the German Dan-Kollegium_{[de]} (DDK) like Alfred Rhode of the 1st German Judo-Club (1st DJC in Frankfurt am Main). Alfred Rhode had introduced judo in Germany with the 1st DJC at his Frankfurt summer school in 1932.

The separate areas of responsibility of the two associations DJB and DDK complemented each other when the DJB was founded. The DDK was responsible for the Dan bearers, teacher training, dissemination and teaching of judo and examinations. The DJB was from 1955 alone responsible for the competition events - for national and international tournaments and championships, after the DAB had transferred in December 1954 its responsibility for the judo sport to the DJB.

The DJB was recognized in 1956 by the German Sports Federation and worked together until 1990 together with the DDK. On 2 February 1991, the German Judo Federation of the FRG (DJB) and the German Judo Association of the GDR (DJV) united in Passau under the name German Judo Association. Judo Judges organize judo championships in Germany as well as other professional associations in Germany.

From 3 to 6 October 2013 the judo festival celebrated its 60th anniversary with a judo festival in Cologne. Here were u. a. Individual and team competitions carried out and also courses and demonstrations offered.

== Participation ==
There are 2742 judo clubs in Germany and 150,279 judo members

== National League ==
The German Judo Federation organizes the Judo Bundesliga. This is the national league. It is divided into the 1. Bundesliga der Männer and the 2. Bundesliga der Männer for men and the Judo Bundesliga der Frauen for women.

== See also ==
- List of judo organizations
- Judo by country
- Judo in Germany
