= African Judo Union =

Governing body of judo in Africa

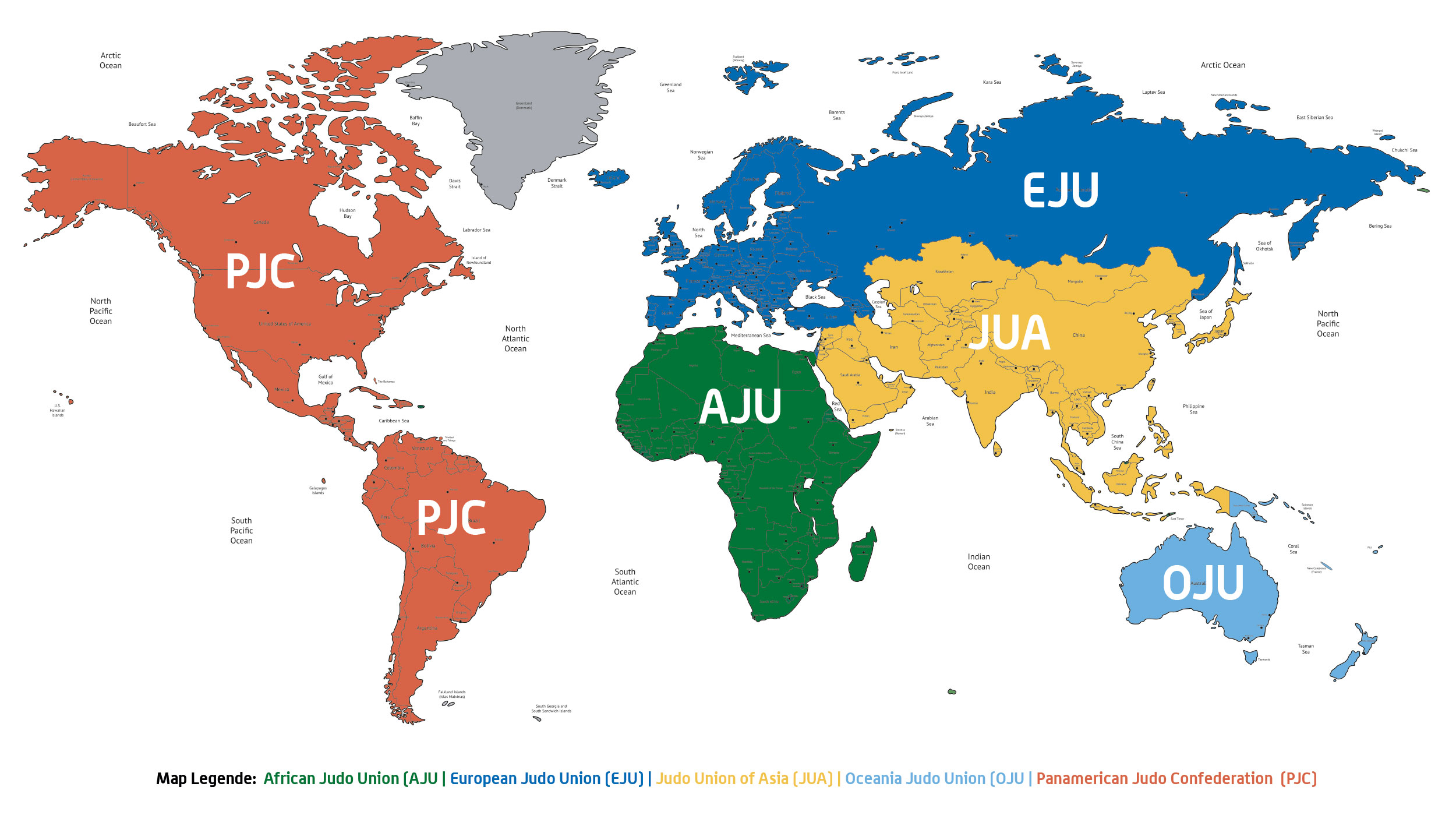
- Abbreviation: AJU
- Formation: 28 November 1961; 64 years ago
- Headquarters: Antananarivo, Madagascar
- Region served: Africa
- Members: 54 Judo federations
- Official languages: English; French; Arabic
- President: (Madagascar) Siteny Randrianasoloniako
- Vice-Presidents: (Algeria) Mohamed Meridja (Zambia) Alfred Foloko
- General Secretary: (Botswana) Estony Hattingh-Pridgeon
- General Treasurer: (Morocco) Chafik El Kettani
- Main organ: AJU Congress
- Parent organization: IJF
- Website: africajudo.org

The African Judo Union (AJU) is the governing body of judo in Africa. It is one of the five continental confederations making up the International Judo Federation (IJF). AJU was formed on 28 November 1961 in Dakar (Senegal). AJU has headquarters in Madagascar and consists of 54 member federations.

== History ==
The African Judo Union was founded on 28 November 1961 in Dakar, Senegal under the name of Union Afro-Malgache de Judo (UAMJ). The first competitions were the African Championships in 1964 in Dakar and the African Games in 1965 in Brazzaville.

== Tournaments ==
- African Judo Championships
- African Games
- African Junior Judo Championships
- African Cadet Judo Championships
- African Judo Kata Championships
- African Judo Opens

== Members ==
The 54 members of the AJU are:

- Algeria
- Angola
- Benin
- Botswana
- Burkina Faso
- Burundi
- Cameroon
- Cape Verde
- (Central African Republic) Central African Rep.
- Chad
- Comoros
- (Republic of the Congo) Congo
- (Ivory Coast) Côte d'Ivoire
- (Democratic Republic of the Congo) DR Congo
- Djibouti
- Egypt
- Equatorial Guinea
- Eswatini
- Ethiopia
- Gabon
- (The Gambia) Gambia
- Ghana
- Guinea
- Guinea-Bissau
- Kenya
- Lesotho
- Liberia
- Libya
- Madagascar
- Malawi
- Mali
- Mauritania
- Mauritius
- Morocco
- Mozambique
- Namibia
- Niger
- Nigeria
- Réunion
- Rwanda
- São Tomé and Príncipe
- Senegal
- Seychelles
- Sierra Leone
- Somalia
- South Africa
- South Sudan
- Sudan
- Togo
- Tunisia
- Uganda
- Tanzania
- Zambia
- Zimbabwe

== See also ==
- List of judo organizations
