= NJF =

NJF can stand for:

- Al Najaf International Airport (IATA code), in Najaf, Iraq
- Nicholas J. Fuentes, a political commentator
- NJF Capital or NJF Holdings, investment companies founded by Nicole Junkermann
- Norsk Jazzforum or its predecessor Norsk Jazzforbund
- Norwegian Judo Federation
- Norwegian Union of Railway Workers, Norsk Jernbaneforbund in Norwegian
