= NBF =

NBF may refer to:

- Nathan Bedford Forrest
- National Bank of Fiji
- National Bank of Fujairah
- National Bolshevik Front
- National Bonsai Foundation
- National Book Festival
- National Book Foundation
- NetBIOS Frames
- Nordic Business Forum
- North Borneo Federation
- Notodden Blues Festival
- Norwegian Bowling Federation
- The Naxi language has ISO 639-3 code nbf
