= All Japan Judo Federation =

Judo federation

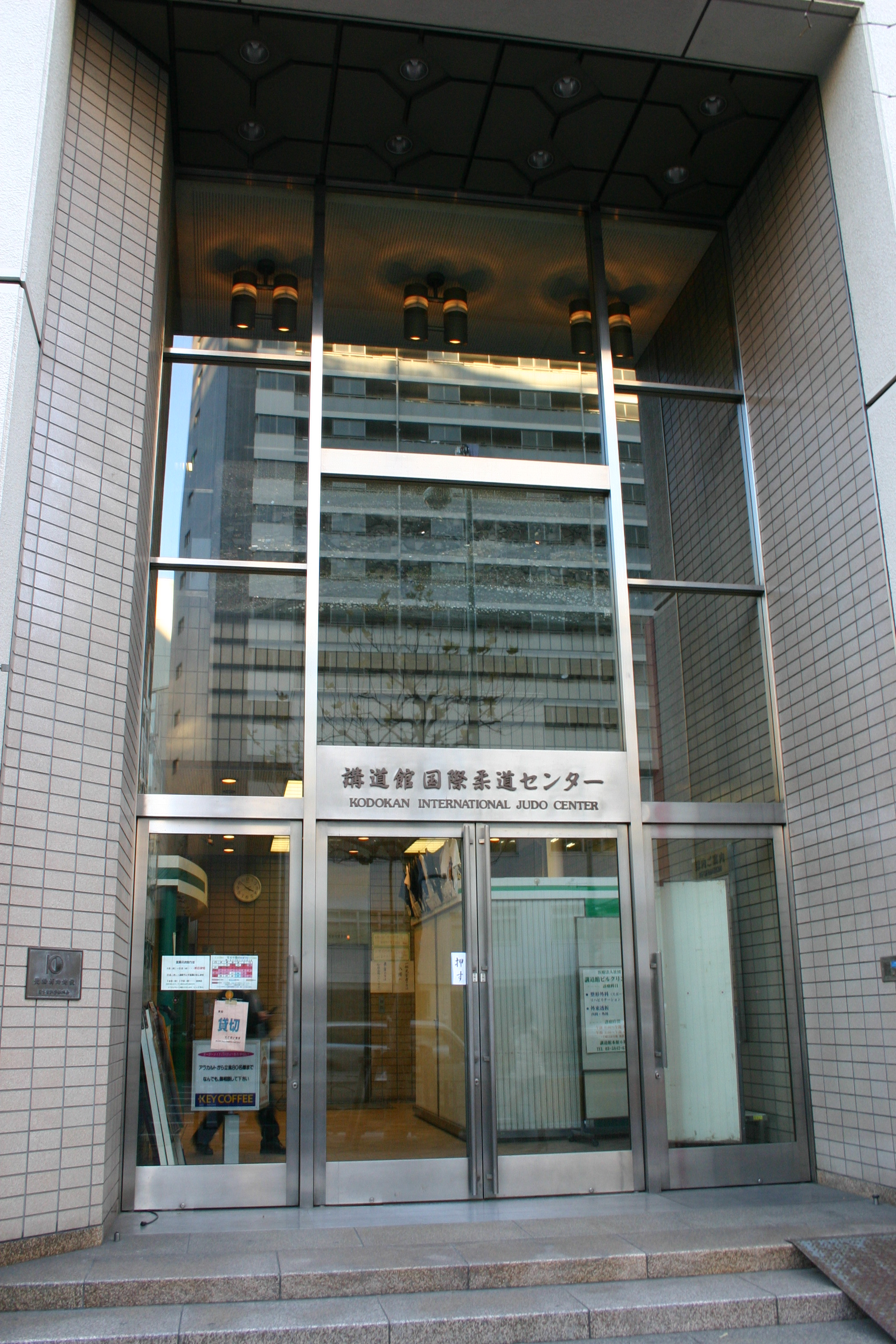
- Founded: May 1949
- Headquarters: Tokyo, Japan
- President: Yasuhiro Yamashita

Official website
- www.judo.or.jp

Founded in 1949, the All Japan Judo Federation (Japanese: 全日本柔道連盟) is the largest judo association in Japan, and the official representative for judo in the Japanese Olympic Committee.

The Federation has several subsidiary organizations, including the All Japan University Judo Federation, the All Japan Business Group Judo Federation, the All Japan High School Athletic Federation, and the Nippon Junior High School Physical Culture Association's Judo Competition Division.

== Important Dates ==
- 1949, May 6: Founded
- 1949, October 26: Member of the Japanese Sports Association
- 1952, December 10: Member of the International Judo Federation
- 1956, May 2: Member of the Judo Union of Asia
- 1988, June 8: Corporate status acquisition
- 1989, August 7: Member of the Japanese Olympic Committee

== Current Leadership ==
- President: Yasuhiro Yamashita
- Vice President: Seiki Nose, Atsuko Ishi, Shinichi Nakamura, Takahiro Nishida
- Professional Service Director: Nakasato
- Director of Bureau: Nakasu

=== Scandal ===
In December 2011, Jiro Fukuda made unwanted sexual advances towards a female athlete, forcibly hugging and kissing her. Fukuda announced his intention to resign when the incident came to light in 2013.

In March 2013, Hiroyuki Tanaka, of the All Japan Judo Federation, and several other directors illegally received a grant from the Japan Sports Promotion Center (JSC). Immediately, an independent commission was established to investigate.

On April 26, 2013, an interim report was issued by the secretariat of the governing body on the case of illegally using a part of the subsidy paid to the leader of the Japan Sports Promotion Center as reinforcement reserve for food and drinking expenses. There was certifiable evidence of involvement by a foreign consortium due to the fact that a reservation payment e-mail was sent to recipients, a dunning e-mail was made if payment was delayed, there was a deposit bankbook of retained deposits in the secretariat's safe, etc. The misdirected money was also inappropriate in light of social norms, and violated the Pure Practice Law. It was pointed out that the organization didn't act in the spirit of legislation governing public subsidies. The misdirected funds were managed by Kamiro Yoshimura, who succeeded Uemura as strengthening committee chairman, and the balance reached about 23.5 million yen. The management of books and receipts was in bad faith, and the Japan Sports Promotion Center and Nagoya Sports Promotion Center bore some responsibility. The lack of proper management by the IOC was also pointed out.

On June 21, 2013, the independent commission published a final report that was roughly the same as the interim report, but added that, at the end 2007, 27 leaders were involved in fraudulent receipt of a 36.2 million yen subsidy. It was certified that the funds used for illegitimate purposes reached 33.45 million yen.

In addition, the final report said that those who "have the heaviest responsibility" were fully involved in these issues, including Yoshimura Waro, who was the strengthening committee chairperson at the time. Also included are the former reinforcement chairman, who did not have the judgment to rectify the situation, and Haruki Uemura, chairman of the Board of Contractors. Upon receiving this, Uemura announced his retirement as chairman of the board as of 2014.

On July 23, 2013, due to successive scandals, the Cabinet Office received a recommendation for measures for improvement, based on the Public Interest Certification Act, which is the first since the adoption of the new corporation system in 2008.

==== Timeline ====
2012

- Letters to JOC from 15 people, including December 4 athlete, alleging abuse by women's coach Ryuji Sonoda and his staff.

2013

- January 30 – Announcement of allegations at a press conference.
- January 31 – Chairman Uemura resigns as head of the JOC player strengthening headquarters.
- February 1 – Coach Ryuji Sonoda resigns.
- February 5 – Yoshimura strengthening director, Tokuno coach resigns.
- March 8 – Independent commission (violence problem) summarizes recommendations.
- March 12 – Independent commission reports. Mr Uemura intends to continue.
- March 14 – Discovery of the grant problem.
- March 18 – The Board of Directors determines Uemura and others' successive decisions.
- March 19 – JOC decides to dispose of such as grant suspension.
- March 26 – Establishment of reform project.
- April 26 – Independent commission (grant problem) interim report, Chairman Uemura suggests resignation.
- April 27 – The president's advancement and exit at the executive board. No discussion.
- May 23 – Discovery of sexual harassment by the director.
- June 7 – Public Interest Authorization committee requests resubmission of report.
- June 11 – Mr. Uemura to continue as chairman announced after board meeting.
- June 21 – Independent commission pointed out the responsibilities of Uemura, et al.
- June 24 – Chairman Uemura resigns, effective the end of the year.
- June 25 – At a meeting of the board of directors, some directors resign as does the chairman.
- July 3 – Establishment of task force to implement reform.
- July 9 – Extraordinary board of directors decision.
- July 23 – Cabinet Office improvement recommendations.
- July 25 – Mr. Uemura resignation suggested ahead of schedule.
- July 30 – Chairman and four executive officers to resign during August, 23 delegates dismissed by the board of directors.
- August 21 – Resignation of 23 executive directors and 3 auditors including the executive club, such as Chairman Uemura. The establishment of a new executive committee.
- September 4 – Discovery that Tadashi Shota, Director General of Tenri University judo department, took office as a director without reporting internal violence.

== Competitions ==
=== Main competitions ===
In recent years, girls judo has become established as an official sports competition internationally, so we will continue to organize and consolidate the tournament organized. Integration of conventions that have been carried out by gender has also been done so far.

General tournament

- All-Japan Judo Championships (Boys)
- Empress's Cup All-Japan Women's Judo Championships (Girls).
- All Japan Selection Judo Weight National Championships (Men and women).
- Kodokan Cup All Nippon Judo Weight Championships (Men and women).
- All-Japan business judo group opposition meeting.
- All Japan Business Judo Individual Championships.
- Grand Slam Tokyo (formerly the Kado Haragoro Cup International Judo Championship).

Competitions for students

- All Japan Student Judo Champions Tournament.
- All Japan Junior Judo Weight Championship (JOC Junior Olympic Cup).
- National High School General Physical Education Competition Judo Games (Interhei).
- National High School Judo Championship Tournament (National High School Screening Competition).
- Golden Eagle Flag National High School Judo Competition (held in Fukuoka city separately from the inter-high in the summer).
- Junior High School Judo Tournament (All-Japan Middle School Physical Education Competition).
- National juvenile judo contest.

=== Major tournament that was once held ===
- Prefectural Counter All Japan Women's Judo Games (1985 - 2009)
- Fukuoka International Women's Judo Championship Tournament (1983 - 2006 integrated with the Kana Ko)

=== International competition ===
The All Japan Judo Federation is a member of the Asian umbrella organization Judo Union of Asia (JUA) as well as the World Association for International Judo Federation (IJF).

On the part of the Japanese Olympic Committee, the JOC is the only Judo Association authorized to send athletes to the Olympic Games.

== See also ==
- List of judo organizations
- Judo by country
