= Judo in Brazil =

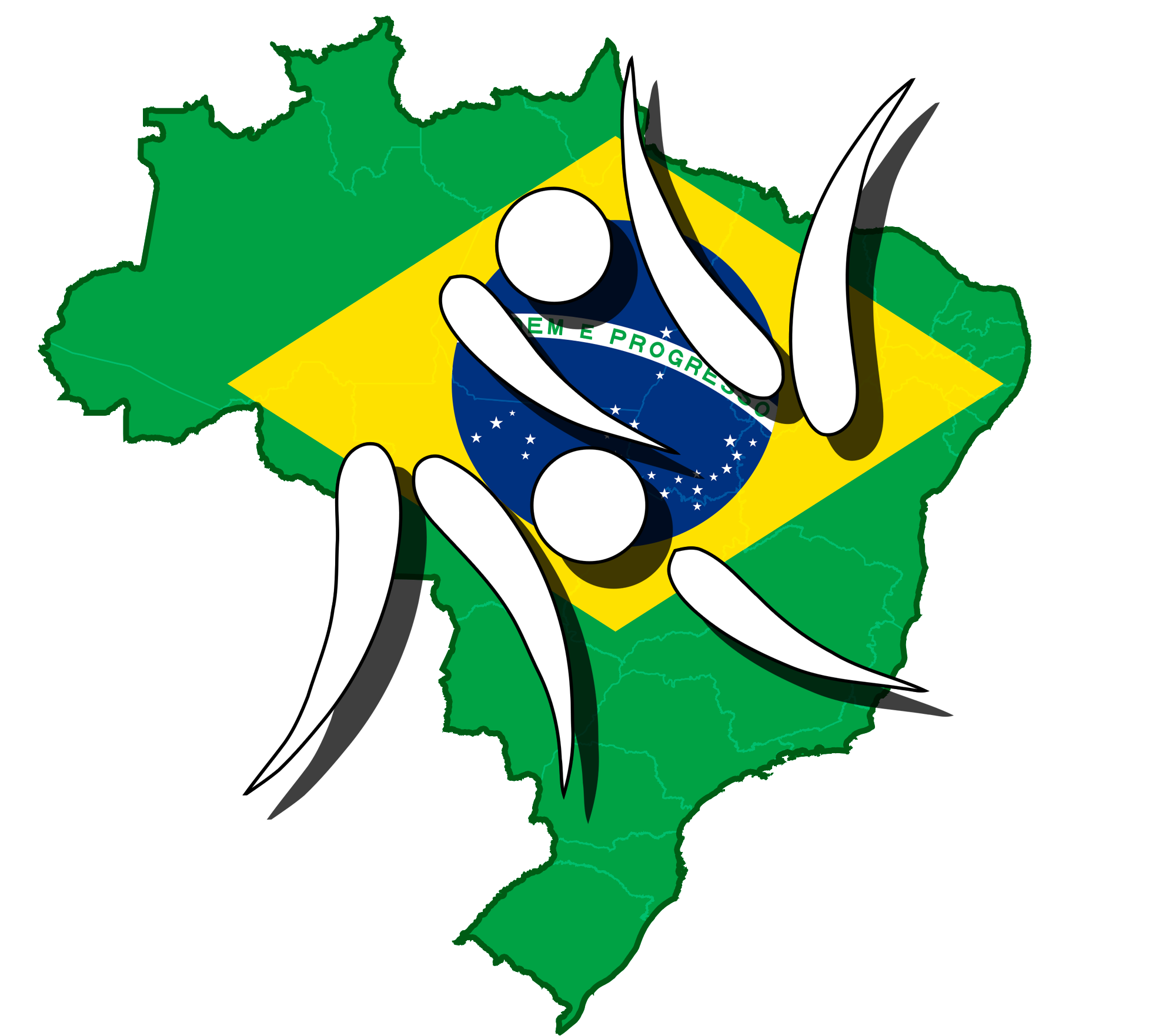
- Governing body: CBJ
- First played: 14 November 1914; 112 years ago

The practice of the Japanese martial art of judo in Brazil dates back to 1914, and its presence spawned the creation of another notable martial art, Brazilian jiu-jitsu. However, judo practice in Brazil did not cease after the inception of Brazilian jiu-jitsu, as evidenced by the fourth edition of the World Judo Championships being held in Rio de Janeiro in 1965. Furthermore, in the 2012 Summer Olympics, Brazilian judoka Sarah Menezes won the gold medal in judo, with other Brazilians winning bronze medals in various divisions, placing Brazil sixth overall in the total number of medals won in judo at the 2012 Summer Games, signifying the continued vitality of the martial art in Brazil.

== History ==
=== Inception ===
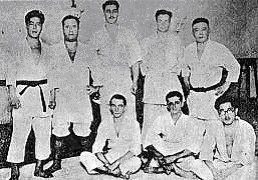
Maeda's first Brazilian students

Mitsuyo Maeda introduced judo to Brazil in November 1914. Maeda was a member of the Kodokan, and one of judo's five top groundwork experts. Judo founder, Kanō Jigorō sent Maeda as something of an ambassador to broaden judo practice on a worldwide level. Maeda introduced judo (designated 'Kano Jiu-Jitsu' in that period) to Carlos Gracie, the first of several in his family that would take up the sport and eventually mold it into Brazilian jiu-jitsu, sometimes referred to as "Gracie Jiu-Jitsu".

=== Masahiko Kimura vs. Hélio Gracie (1951) ===
After winning fights against boxers and savate fighters in Europe, Japanese judoka Masahiko Kimura decided to accept an invitation from Gracie jiu jitsu co-founder Hélio Gracie to fight him in Brazil. In 1951, Kimura defeated Gracie in a submission judo match held in Brazil. During the fight, Kimura threw Gracie repeatedly but Hélio was undeterred. Unable to subdue Gracie solely by throwing, the fight proceeded into groundwork. Kimura maintained dominance in the ground fighting portion, eventually positioning himself to apply a reverse ude-garami (now commonly referred to as a Kimura). Gracie however did not submit to the technique which ultimately resulted in his elbow being dislocated as well as the radius and ulna bones being broken. Gracie's corner threw in the towel at this point; it has been speculated that they delayed this action on Gracie's instruction. This marked a significant event in the history of judo in Brazil, as stated by Kimura; "20,000 people came to see the bout including President of Brazil". After being declared the winner, Kimura said "Japanese Brazilians rushed into the ring and tossed me up in the air".

│
1914
│
1924
│
1934
│
1944
│
1954
│
1964
│
1974
│
1984
│
1994
│
2004
│
2014

== World Judo Championships ==
Brazil has a major presence in the World Judo Championships. Rio de Janeiro first hosted the competition in October 1965, which was only the fourth edition of the championships. Although Brazil did not medal, this initial meeting would pave the way for future events. At the seventh edition of the Championships held in Ludwigshafen, West Germany, in September 1971, Brazilian judoka Chiaki Ishii earned the first World Judo Championship medal for Brazil. Since then Brazil has earned several medals. João Derly however, is Brazil's only judoka to become a two-time world champion, winning the 2005 and 2007 World Judo Championships consecutively, the latter of the two hosted at Rio de Janeiro's HSBC Arena. This event marked the first time that Brazil had hosted a mixed-gender World Judo Championship. Brazil ranked second overall in medals behind Japan at the 2007 Championships, earning three gold medals along with a bronze. In 2013, Brazil once again hosted the World Judo Championships, this time placing fourth overall behind Cuba, despite surpassing Cuba in the total number of medals. In this event, Rafaela Silva made history by becoming the first Brazilian judoka to claim gold in a women's division.

== Olympic medals ==
Brazil won 26 medals at the Olympics between 1972 and 2024. By year: 1972: Chiaki Ishii; 1984: Douglas Vieira, Luís Onmura and Walter Carmona; 1988: Aurélio Miguel; 1992: Rogério Sampaio; 1996: Henrique Guimarães and Aurélio Miguel; 2000: Tiago Camilo and Carlos Honorato; 2004: Leandro Guilheiro and Flávio Canto; 2008: Leandro Guilheiro, Tiago Camilo and Ketleyn Quadros; 2012: Sarah Menezes, Felipe Kitadai, Rafael Silva and Mayra Aguiar; 2016: Rafaela Silva, Rafael Silva and Mayra Aguiar; 2020: Daniel Cargnin and Mayra Aguiar; 2024: Willian Lima and Larissa Pimenta.

== See also ==
- Brazilian Judo Confederation
- Brazil at the World Judo Championships
