= European Judo Union =

Judo federations

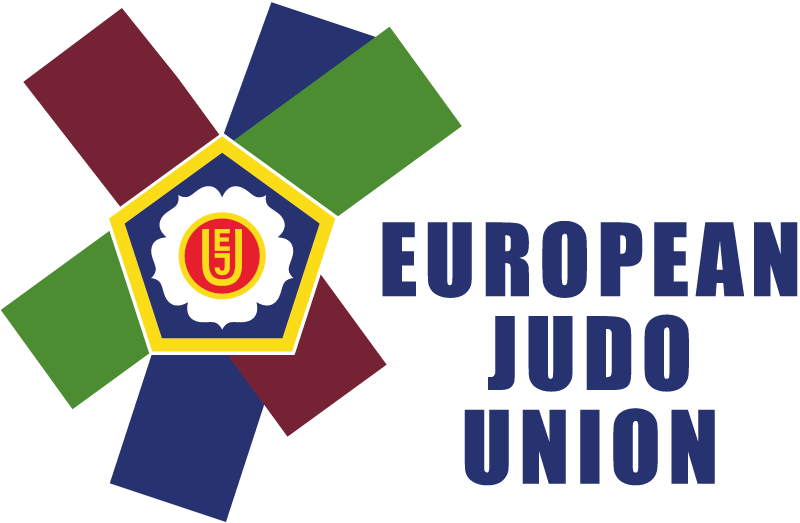

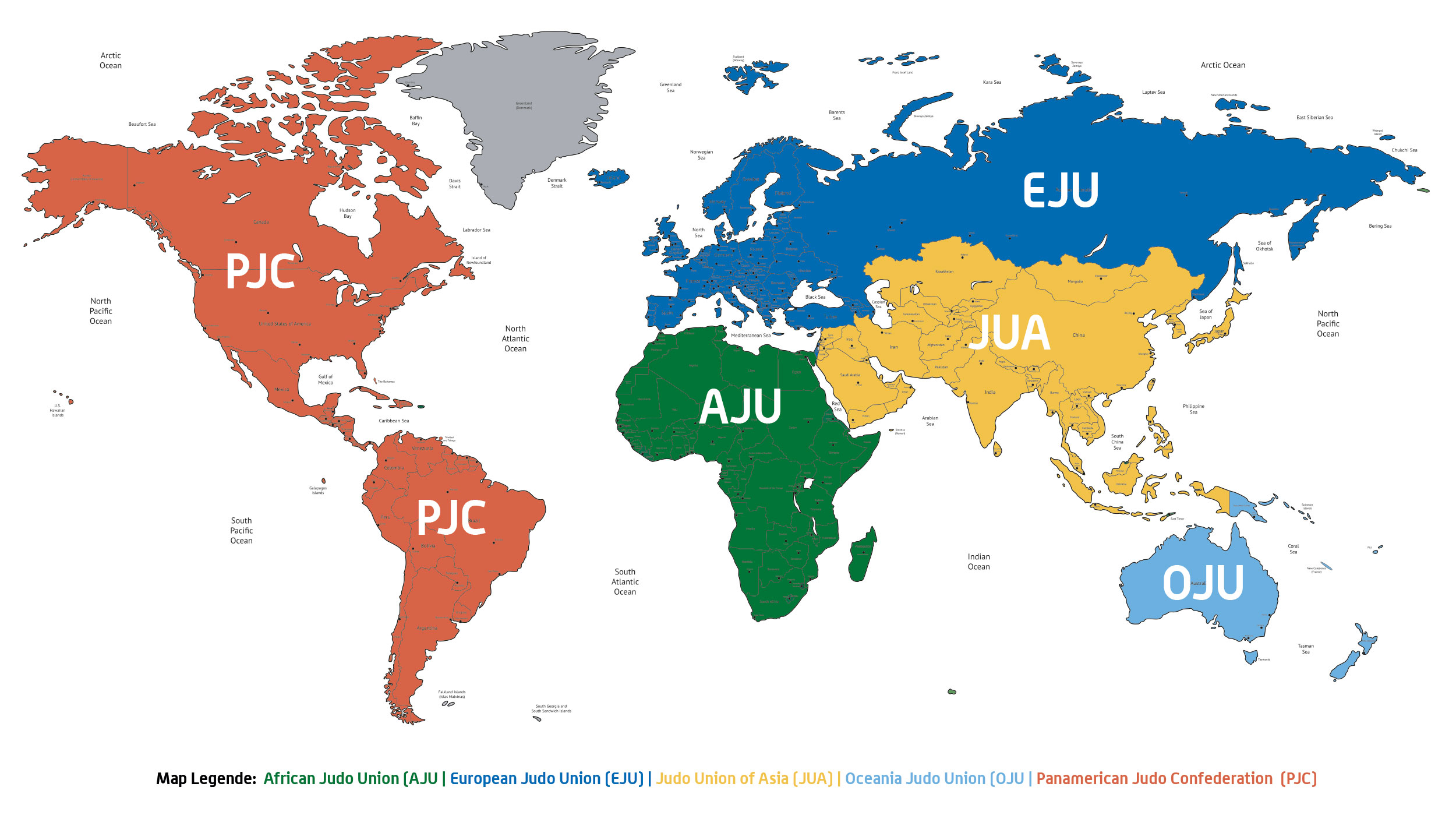
- Abbreviation: EJU
- Formation: 28 July 1948; 77 years ago
- Headquarters: Vienna, Austria
- Region served: Europe
- Members: 51 Judo federations
- Official languages: English
- President: (Hungary) Dr. László Tóth
- Senior Vice-President: (Germany) Otto Kneitinger
- Vice-Presidents: (Croatia) Hrvoje Lindi (Switzerland) Sergei Aschwanden
- General Secretary: (Austria) Dr. Martin Poiger
- Main organ: EJU Congress
- Parent organization: IJF
- Website: eju.net

The European Judo Federation consists of 51 national Judo federations/associations, and is itself recognised by the International Judo Federation as one of five continental unions. The organisation of the administration of Judo is based on a pyramid system of regulations, with the IJF the world governing body, the EJU the European governing body, and national Judo associations the governing bodies at domestic level.

The first meeting was held on 26 July 1948, in London to form the European Judo Union (EJU). Representatives from Great Britain, Austria, and the Netherlands took part. The meeting was adjourned until the following Wednesday. On 28 July finally, Great Britain put forward the motion: "That the European Judo Union be now formed on the basis of the Constitution as approved, and that all other European countries be circulated with a copy of it and be invited to join." This was seconded by Holland and approved unanimously. France, who was allowed to express opinions but not to vote.

The object of the proposed Union was the standardisation of judo rules and procedures and the establishment of an international body for arbitration. Inclusion of judo in the Olympic Games was first mentioned in this meeting. Young French publisher Henry D. Plee suggested that he print a translation of the Kodokan's monthly magazine in English and French; the EJU agreed to make it an official organ of the EJU.

After the Russian invasion of Ukraine in February 2022, Russian Sergey Soloveychik resigned as European Judo Union President, a position he had held since 2007, and thereafter the Russian Judo Federation and the Belarusian Judo Federation suspended their participation in all EJU international events, and the EJU cancelled two events that had been scheduled to take place in Russia. In May 2023, following the IJF's decision to reinstate Russia and Belarus, the EJU followed suit and re-admitted Russian and Belarusian athletes.

== Presidents ==
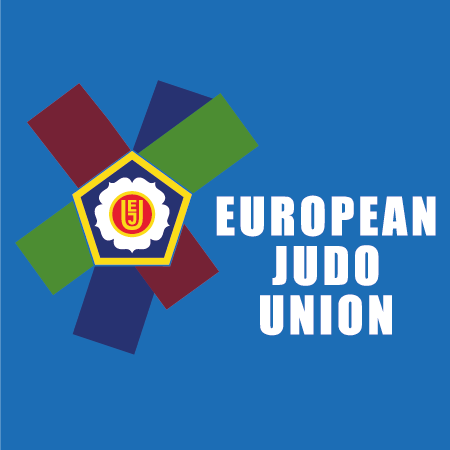

Date	Name	Country
1949	John Barnes	(United Kingdom) Great Britain
1949–1954	Aldo Torti	Italy
1954–1957	Jaap Nauwelaerts D'Agé	Netherlands
1957–1960	H. Frantzen	Germany
1960–1984	A.J. Ertel	France
1984–1996	Kurt Kucera	Austria
1996–2000	Frans Hoogendijk	Netherlands
2000–2007	Marius Vizer	Austria
2007–2022	Sergey Soloveychik	Russia
2022	Otto Kneitinger – ad interim	Germany
2022–present	László Toth	Hungary

== Awards ==
Nomination	Nominees 2010	Nominees 2011	Nominees 2012	Nominees 2013	Nominees 2014	Nominees 2015	Nominees 2016	Nominees 2017	Nominees 2018	Nominees 2019	Nominees 2020	Nominees 2023
Best European Male Judoka	Ilias Iliadis (Greece)	Teddy Riner (France)	Teddy Riner (France)	Teddy Riner (France)	Avtandili Tchrikishvili (Georgia (country))	Teddy Riner (France)	Teddy Riner (France)	Teddy Riner (France)	Nikoloz Sherazadishvili (Spain)	Lukhumi Chkhvimiani (Georgia (country))	Peter Paltchik (Israel)	
Best European Female Judoka	Lucie Décosse (France)	Gévrise Émane (France)	Lucie Décosse (France)	Majlinda Kelmendi (Kosovo)	Majlinda Kelmendi (Kosovo)	Tina Trstenjak (Slovenia)	Tina Trstenjak (Slovenia)	Clarisse Agbegnenou (France)	Clarisse Agbegnenou (France)	Clarisse Agbegnenou (France)	Clarisse Agbegnenou (France)	
Best European Junior Male Judoka	Marcus Nyman (Sweden)	Khusen Khalmurzaev (Russia)	Damian Szwarnowiecki (Poland)	Beka Gviniashvili (Georgia (country))	Krisztián Tóth (Hungary)	Beka Gviniashvili (Georgia (country))	Hidayat Heydarov (Azerbaijan)	Hidayat Heydarov (Azerbaijan)	Manuel Lombardo (Italy)	Lasha Bekauri (Georgia (country))	Richárd Sipőcz (Hungary)	
Best European Junior Female Judoka	Abigél Joó (Hungary)	Bernadette Graf (Austria)	Dilara Lokmanhekim (Turkey)	Barbara Matić (Croatia)	Amandine Buchard (France)	Szabina Gercsák (Hungary)	Marie-Ève Gahié (France)	Amber Gersjes (Netherlands)	Daria Bilodid (Ukraine)	Eteri Liparteliani (Georgia (country))	Andrea Stojadinov (Serbia)	
Best Judo Personality	-	Ilias Iliadis (Greece)	Alina Dumitru (Romania)	Lucie Décosse (France)	Ilias Iliadis (Greece) & Teddy Riner (France)	-	-	-	-			
Best Team Men	-	-	Russia	Georgia (Georgia (country))	-	Georgia (Georgia (country))	Georgia (Georgia (country))	Georgia (Georgia (country))	-	-	-	
Best Team Women	Netherlands	France	-	-	France	Germany	Poland	France	-	-	-	
Best Mixed Team	-	-	-	-	-	-	-	-	-	-	France	
Best European Men's Coach	Benoît Campargue (France)	Vitaily Dubrova (Ukraine)	Ezio Gamba (Russia)	Iraklı Uznadze (Georgia (country))	Irakli Uznadze (Georgia (country))	Franck Chambilly (France)	Dmitri Morozov (Russia)	Ljubisa Majdov (Serbia)	Bato Jikuri (Georgia (country))	John-Paul BELL (Netherlands)	Khasanbi Taov (Russia)	
Best European Women's Coach	Florin Bercean (Romania)	Martine Dupond (France)	Martine Dupond (France)	Shany Hershko (Israel)	Martine Dupond (France)	Marjan Fabjan (Slovenia)	Martine Dupond (France)	Larbi Benboudaoud (France)	Larbi Benboudaoud (France)	Larbi Benboudaoud (France)	Larbi Benboudaoud (France)	
Best European Event	European Judo Championships in Vienna (Austria)	U23 European Judo Championships in Tyumen (Russia)	European Judo Championships in Chelyabinsk (Russia)	European Judo Championships in Budapest (Hungary)	European Judo Championships in Montpellier (France)	Junior European Judo Championships in Oberwart (Austria)	European Judo Championships U23 in Tel Aviv (Israel)	Golden League in Ankara (Turkey)	European Judo Championships in Tel Aviv (Israel)	European Judo Championships / 2nd European Games in Minsk (Belarus)	European Judo Championships in Prague (Czech Republic)	
Best European Organiser	Czech Judo Federation (Czech Republic)	Belgium Judo Federation	Czech Judo Federation (Czech Republic)	Estonian Judo Federation (Estonia)	Polish Judo Association for European Judo Championships U23 in Wroclaw (Poland)	Austrian Judo Federation for Junior European Judo Championships and Golden League in Vienna (Austria)	Russian Judo Federation for European Judo Championships in Kazan and Golden League in Grozny (Russia)	Lithuanian Judo Federation for Upgrading Junior EJC and Cadet EC Kaunas (Lithuania)	Russian Judo Federation for European Mixed Team Judo Championships in Ekaterinburg (Russia)	Portuguese Judo Federation for European Club Championships in Odivelas (Portugal)	Croatian Judo Federation for Junior and U23 Judo Championships in Porec (Croatia)	
Most Progressive European Female Referee	Cathy Mouette (France)	Ioana Babiuc (Romania)	Ioana Babiuc (Romania)	Cathy Mouette (France)	Annamaria Fridrich (Hungary)	Katalin Fridrich (Hungary)	Heather Lootjens (Belgium)	Roberta Chyurlia (Italy)	Roberta Chyurlia (Italy)	Hana SAFARIKOVA (Czech Republic)	Roberta Chyurlia (Italy)	
Most Progressive European Male Referee	Franc Ocko (Slovenia)	Vladimir Vostrikov (Russia)	Vladimir Vostrikov (Russia)	Manuel Cortes (Spain)	Vincent Druaux (France)	Vladimir Hnidka (Czech Republic)	Artur Fando (Belarus)	Vladimer Nutsubidze (Georgia (country))	Raul Camacho (Spain)	Vasily Smolin (Russia)	Matthieu Bataille (France)	
Fairplay												Denis Vieru (Moldova)

== Main events ==
European Judo Championships
Category	Place	Last edition
Seniors	Montpellier, France	3–5 November 2023
Mixed Team	Kraków, Poland	1 July 2023
U23	Potsdam, Germany	17–19 November 2023
Junior	The Hague, Netherlands	7–10 September 2023
Cadet	Coimbra, Portugal	22–25 June 2023
Veteran	Podčetrtek, Slovenia	6–9 June 2024
Kata	Podčetrtek, Slovenia	10 June 2024
ECC – Champions League	Belgrade, Serbia	21 December 2024
ECC – Europa League	Belgrade, Serbia	11 December 2021

Other Tournaments
Tournament	Place	Last edition
Games of Small States of Europe	Valletta, Malta	30 May–1 June 2023

== Members ==
The European Judo Union comprises 51 national judo federations or associations recognized by their respective National Olympic Committees.

- (Albania) Albanian Judo Federation
- Andorra Judo Federation
- (Armenia) Armenian Judo Federation
- (Austria) Austrian Judo Federation
- Azerbaijan Judo Federation
- (Belarus) Belarusian Judo Federation
- Belgium Judo Federation
- (Bosnia and Herzegovina) Bosnia & Herzegovina Judo Federation
- (United Kingdom) British Judo Association
- (Bulgaria) Bulgarian Judo Federation
- (Croatia) Croatian Judo Federation
- Cyprus Judo Federation
- (Czech Republic) Czech Judo Federation
- (Denmark) Danish Judo Federation
- (Netherlands) Dutch Judo Federation
- (Estonia) Estonian Judo Association
- Faroe Islands Judo Federation
- (Finland) Finnish Judo Association
- (France) French Judo Federation
- (Georgia (country)) Georgian Judo Federation
- (Germany) German Judo Federation
- (Greece) Hellenic Judo Federation
- (Hungary) Hungarian Judo Association
- Iceland Judo Federation
- (Republic of Ireland) Irish Judo Association
- Israel Judo Association
- (Italy) Italian Judo Federation
- Kosovo Judo Federation
- Latvia Judo Federation
- Liechtenstein Judo Federation
- (Lithuania) Lithuanian Judo Federation
- Luxembourg Judo Federation
- Malta Judo Federation
- Moldova Judo Federation
- Monaco Judo Federation
- Montenegro Judo Federation
- (North Macedonia) North Macedonian Judo Federation
- (Norway) Norwegian Judo Federation
- (Poland) Polish Judo Association
- Portugal Judo Federation
- (Romania) Romanian Judo Federation
- (Russia) Russian Judo Federation
- San Marino Judo Federation
- Serbia Judo Federation
- (Slovakia) Slovak Judo Federation
- (Slovenia) Slovenian Judo Federation
- (Spain) Spanish Judo Federation
- (Sweden) Swedish Judo Federation
- (Switzerland) Swiss Judo Federation
- (Turkey) Turkish Judo Federation
- (Ukraine) Ukrainian Judo Federation
