= Judo in France =

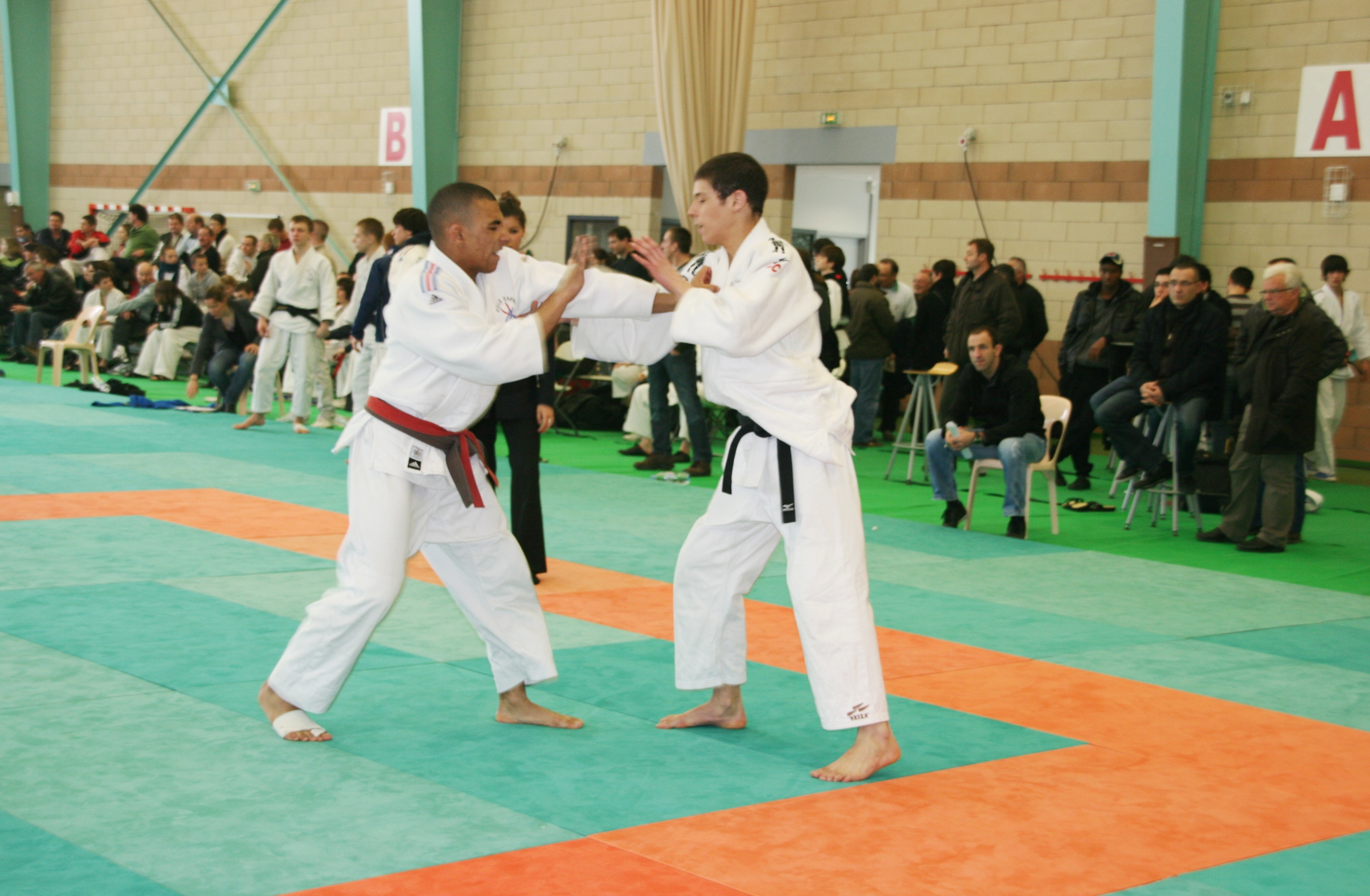
- French judo competition in 2011
- Country: France
- Governing body: French Judo Federation
- National team(s): France Olympics team

International competitions
- European Judo Championships; World Judo Championships; Summer Olympics

Judo in France is one of the most popular sports in the country. The French Judo Federation is the national governing body for Judo in France.

== History ==
Moshé Feldenkrais was the first man to introduce the sport into the country. Besides Japan no other country has won more medals in Judo at the Olympics.
