= French Judo Federation =

Governing body of Judo in France

- Jurisdiction: France
- Abbreviation: FFJDA
- Founded: 5 December 1946
- Headquarters: Paris, France
- President: Jean-Luc Rougé

Official website
- www.ffjudo.com
- (France)

French Judo Federation (French: Fédération française de judo, jujitsu, kendo et disciplines associées (FFJDA), is the sports association that aims to promote the practice of Judo and related disciplines composed of Jujutsu, Kendo, Iaido, Sport Chanbara, Jōdō, Naginata and Sumo.

== History ==
Created on December 5, 1946 under the name of the French Judo and Jiu-Jitsu Federation (FFJJJ), its first president was Paul Bonet-Maury from 1946 to 1956. It was declared of public utility on August 2, 1991.

It is currently the fourth French sports federation in terms of the number of members with about 592,000 members in 2011. As of May 29, 2009, the federation has 548,014 licensees distributed over 5,688 clubs. The largest club has more than 1,000 licensees (The Kodokan Club Courbevoie with 1019 licensed on May 29, 2009). The average number of licensees per club is about 96.

The Federation has 34 regional leagues and 85 departmental committees.

The current president of the federation, elected in 2005, is the former judoka Jean-Luc Rougé, first world champion in the history of French judo in 1975.

At the International Judo Federation Congress held in Rio de Janeiro (Brazil) in September 2007, on the sidelines of the 2007 World Judo Championships, the FFJDA was appointed by a large majority to organize the 2011 World Judo Championships in Paris.

== Kendo ==
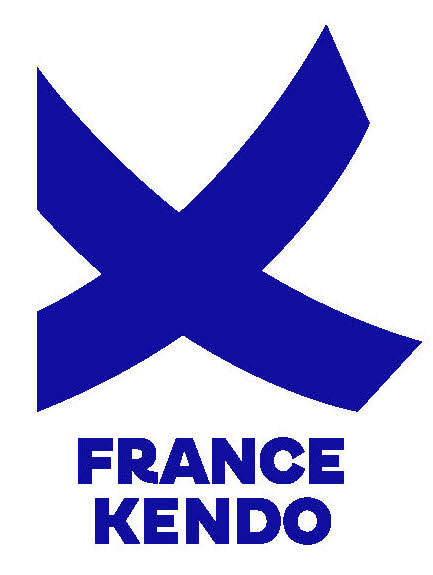
CNKDR Logo

National Committee of Kendo and Related Disciplines (French: Comité National de Kendo et Disciplines Rattachées (CNKDR) is the official governing body for kendo in France, operating under the jurisdiction of the French Judo Federation (FFJDA). It is a member of the European Kendo Federation (EKF) and is responsible for the development, promotion, and regulation of kendo and related martial arts across the country.

In addition to kendo, the CNKDR oversees and promotes Iaido, Jōdō, Naginata, and Sport chanbara, organizing competitions, training programs, and certification exams for practitioners of these disciplines. The committee also coordinates national and regional tournaments, ensuring alignment with international standards set by the EKF and the International Kendo Federation (FIK).

France has a long and successful history in competitive kendo, consistently ranking among the top nations in the European Kendo Championship. French kendoka have secured numerous individual and team titles.

== See also ==
- List of judo organizations
- Judo in France
- Judo by country
