= Philippine Judo Federation =

Judo federation

- Jurisdiction: Philippines
- Affiliation: International Judo Federation
- Headquarters: Manila, Philippines
- President: Ali Sulit
- Director: Emir Reyes
- Secretary: David Carter
- (Philippines)

The Philippine Judo Federation is the national governing body for Judo in the Philippines. It is accredited by the International Judo Federation which is the governing body for the sport of Judo in the world.
