= Pan American Judo Union =

Continental judo confederation

- Sport: Judo
- Jurisdiction: International
- Abbreviation: PJU
- Founded: 1952
- Affiliation: World Judo Federation

Official website
- pju-upj.org

The Pan American Judo Union (PJU) is an international organization comprising national Judo federations and associations of the Americas, and was one of five such continental organizations recognized by the International Judo Federation.

The PJU is currently a member of the World Judo Federation (WJF).

== History ==
It was founded in 1952. It was the official organizer of the Pan American Judo Championships from 1952 to 2008 and was responsible for selecting the qualification requirements for the continental quota for the Olympic Games.

The PJU was replaced by the Pan American Judo Confederation (PJC) when it was founded in 2009. This decision was appealed at the International Court for sports. It declared that the PJU had to be reinstated as the judo union for the American continent.

== See also ==
- List of judo organizations
- Judo by country
