= African Cadet Judo Championships =

Judo competition

- Current event or competition: 2026 African Cadet Judo Championships

Competition details
- Discipline: Judo
- Type: Annual
- Organiser: African Judo Union (AJU)

History
- First edition: 2012 in Gaborone, Botswana
- Editions: 11
- Most wins: Egypt – 105 medals (43 gold medals)
- Most recent: Luanda 2025

The African Cadet Judo Championships are the highest level of African judo competition for cadets, 18 years of age or less. The championships are held every year by the African Judo Union, and qualified judoka compete in their respective categories as representatives of their countries. The first edition was helds in Gaborone, Botswana on 2012.

== Competitions ==
Edition	Year	Dates	City and host country	Venue	Countries	Athletes	Top country	Ref.
1	2012	2–7 October	Gaborone, Botswana		19	101	South Africa	
2	2013	2–3 July	Algiers, Algeria		19	108	Algeria	
3	2014	21–23 March	Tunis, Tunisia		17	141	Tunisia	
4	2015	22–24 July	Sharm El Sheikh, Egypt		10	89	Algeria	
5	2016	21–23 July	Casablanca, Morocco		8	66	Tunisia	
6	2017	5–7 May	Cairo, Egypt		9	88	Tunisia	
7	2018	10 May	Bujumbura, Burundi	Judo Sport Center	15	101	Algeria	
8	2019	2–3 May	Dakar, Senegal	Dakar Arena	14	114	Tunisia	
—	2020	Canceled due to the COVID-19 pandemic in Africa						
—	2021	Canceled due to the COVID-19 pandemic in Africa						
9	2022	21–22 July	Nairobi, Kenya	Safaricom Indoor Arena	15	88	Egypt	
10	2023	29 July	Antananarivo, Madagascar	Palais des Sports de Mahamasina	17	114	Egypt	
11	2024	15 August	Yaoundé, Cameroon	Palais des Sports Warda	16	129	Egypt	
12	2025	17–18 July	Luanda, Angola		14	125	Egypt	
13	2026	23 July	Casablanca, Morocco		18	142	Algeria	

== All-time medal table 2012–2024 ==
Rank	Nation	Gold	Silver	Bronze	Total
1	Egypt	43	23	39	105
2	Algeria	42	37	49	128
3	Tunisia	39	23	36	98
4	Morocco	21	17	22	60
5	South Africa	9	18	25	52
6	Angola	7	8	6	21
7	Senegal	2	8	7	17
8	Madagascar	2	3	6	11
9	Burundi	2	2	10	14
10	Cameroon	1	7	12	20
11	Gabon	1	2	9	12
12	Mozambique	1	2	5	8
13	Zambia	1	1	2	4
14	Libya	0	3	2	5
15	Ivory Coast	0	2	7	9
16	Kenya	0	2	3	5
17	Zimbabwe	0	2	0	2
18	Guinea	0	1	3	4
19	Burkina Faso	0	1	0	1
19	Gambia	0	1	0	1
19	Mali	0	1	0	1
22	Botswana	0	0	2	2
23	DR Congo	0	0	1	1
23	Mauritius	0	0	1	1
Totals (24 entries)		171	164	247	582

== Team competitions ==
Mixed teams
Year	Location	Gold	Silver	Bronze		Ref.
2022	Nairobi, Kenya	Egypt	Angola	Cameroon	South Africa	
2026	Casablanca, Morocco	Egypt	Algeria	Angola	Tunisia	

== See also ==
- African Judo Championships
- African Junior Judo Championships
