= Norwegian Judo Federation =

Judo federation

- Sport: Judo
- Abbreviation: NJF
- Founded: 1967
- Affiliation: IJF
- Regional affiliation: EJU
- Headquarters: Oslo
- President: BREKKE Arnstein

Official website
- www.judo.no
- (Norway)

The Norwegian Judo Federation (Norwegian: Norges Judoforbund - NJF) is the national federation of judo in Norway. It is a member of both the European Judo Union and the International Judo Federation (IJF). The Judokas have been actively participating in international tournaments.

== History ==
The Norwegian Judo Federation was founded in 1967.

=== Summer Olympics ===
Three Norwegian Judokas participated at the 1984 Summer Olympics. Alfredo Chinchilla participated in the Men's 65 kg category. He won one fight. Frank Evensen and Fridtjof Thoen lost their first round.

One Norwegian Judoka participated at the 1992 Summer Olympics. Stig Traavik lost the first round.

=== Judo for Peace ===
In 2002 the Norwegian Judo Federation started training Afghan judokas under an exchange program with the Afghan Judo Federation established that year with the federation slogan "Judo for Peace". What began as a modest effort took on a big scale as increasingly more Afghan children and teenagers enrolled in the training program, the demand rising further. The project's objective also included giving priority to the underprivileged girls and women of Afghanistan, who showed equal interest and enthusiasm to their male counterparts. The result was a historic first: Fariba Rezayee became the first ever Afghan female to participate in an Olympic competition (in 2004).

In 2010, it participated in the "Judo for Peace Event" hosted by the IJF in Jaipur, India.

== Organization ==
The organisation's headquarters is in Oslo.

=== Chairmen of the NJF ===
Dates	Name
1967–1969	Torkel Sauer
1970	Jon Døhl
1971–1972	Atle Lundsrud
1972-1973	Gunnar Foss
1974	Per Ingvoldstad
1975–1976	Odd Johnsen
1977–1979	Rune Neraal
1980–1983	Jan Frank Ulvås
1984–1986	Lars Nicolay Hvardal
1987–1991	Bjarne Heimdal
1991–1994	Arild Sand
1994–1999	Erik Otto Jacobsen
1999–2003	Alf Birger Rostad
2003–2009	Jan Eirik Schiøtz
2009–2014	Vibeke Thiblin

== See also ==
- List of judo organizations
- Judo by country
