= Marius Vizer =

Romanian businessman (born 1958)

- Marius Vizer, 2026

9th President of IJF
- Incumbent
- Assumed office 2007
- Preceded by: Park Yong-sung

Personal details
- Born: 7 November 1958 (age 67) Tinca, Romania
- Education: Military Academy
- Occupation: Businessman

Marius Vizer (born 7 November 1958) is a Romanian businessman and former judoka. Since 2007, he has been the president of the International Judo Federation. Vizer also holds an Austrian passport. Vizer holds a 8th dan black belt in judo.

== Judo ==
Between 1995 and 2001, he was President of the Romanian Judo Federation. Between 2000 and 2007, Vizer was President of the European Judo Union. And between 2013 and 2015, he was President of the SportAccord.

Since 2007, he has been the president of the International Judo Federation.

Vizer is a long-time friend of Russian President Vladimir Putin. During his tenure at the helm of the IJF, it named Putin as its honorary president and an IJF Ambassador in 2008. That status was initially suspended and then stripped in February and March 2022 in reaction to the Russian invasion of Ukraine. After the invasion of Ukraine, all 31 of the other international Olympic sports organizations temporarily suspended Russian and Belarusian athletes. Vizer wanted to let Russians and Belarusians continue to compete as neutral athletes despite the invasion of Ukraine and subsequent Ukrainian pressure to suspend them entirely. Ultimately, both national federations withdrew on their own accord, until June 2022 when they returned. Ukraine boycotted IJF events beginning in June 2022 because the Russian team was allowed to compete in and entered competitions. Judo is one of the few Olympic sports which goes against the recommendation of the International Olympic Committee.

On 3 October 2026, by order of the President of Azerbaijan, Ilham Aliyev, he was awarded the "Dostlug" Order for his productive efforts and contributions to the advancement of judo in both in Azerbaijan and globally.

== Business ==
He settled in Austria as a judo coach. In the 1990s, Vizer started importing vegetables and fruits from Romania to Austria, especially apples, while he exported banana and orange wagons to Romania. He then organized Telebingo in Romania, in collaboration with TVR, until the National Lottery closed it.

He was the owner of the football clubs FC Bihor, Olimpia Salonta and FC Sopron.

== Personal life ==
In 2015, Vizer married former Romanian singer Irina Nicolae (A.S.I.A.) after years of dating. They live in Budapest. On 2 February 2018, his wife gave birth to the couple's child, Scarlett-Maria.

Sporting positions
Preceded by Anton Muraru	President of the FRJ; 1995–2001	Succeeded by Ovidiu Bârgău
Preceded by Frans Hoogendijk	President of EJU; 2000–2007	Succeeded by Sergey Soloveychik
Preceded by Yong Sung Park	President of IJF; 2007–present	Succeeded by Incumbent
Preceded by Hein Verbruggen	President of SportAccord; 2013–2015	Succeeded by Gian Franco Kasper
