= Pan American Judo Confederation =

Continental judo confederation

- Sport: Judo
- Jurisdiction: International
- Abbreviation: PJC
- Founded: 2009
- Affiliation: IJF
- Affiliation date: March 2009

Official website
- panamjudo.org

The Pan American Judo Confederation (PJC) is an international organization comprising most of the national Judo federations and associations of the Americas, and is one of five such continental organizations recognized by the International Judo Federation. The PJC replaced the Pan American Judo Union (PJU) when it was founded in 2009, a decision which has been contested by the remaining members of the PJU.

== Events ==
- Judo at the Pan American Games
- Judo at the Central American Games
- Judo at the South American Games
- Judo at the Central American and Caribbean Games
- Pan American Judo Championships
- Pan American Junior Judo Championships
- Pan American Cadet Judo Championships
- Pan American U15 Judo Championships
- South American Judo Championships
- South American Junior Judo Championships
- South American Cadet Judo Championships

== See also ==
- List of judo organizations
- Judo by country
