= Kano Risei =

Japanese judoka (1900–1986)

Kanō Risei (嘉納 履正, Kanō Risei; November 25, 1900 – January 13, 1986) was one of the three sons of Kanō Jigorō, the creator of Judo. Kanō Risei was the second president of the International Judo Federation, from 1952 to 1965. He managed the Kōdōkan from 1946 until 1980, when he was succeeded by Kano Yukimitsu.
