= Brazil at the World Judo Championships =

Judo competition

- Flag of Brazil
- IOC code: BRA
- National federation: CBJ
- Website: cbj.com.br
- Medals Ranked 10th: Gold 9 Silver 20 Bronze 39 Total 68

Brazil is 9th on the all time medal table at the World Judo Championships. Brazil's first World Championships medal was won by Chiaki Ishii at Men's -93 kg event in 1971. He won bronze. Danielle Zangrando won the first woman's medal at Women's -56 kg event in 1995. She won bronze. João Derly won the first golden medal at Men's -66 kg event in 2005.

At the 2007 World Judo Championships, held in Rio de Janeiro, Brazil got the best placing on the medal table, finishing 2nd behind only Japan.

== Medalists at the individual competitions ==
Medal	Name	Year	Event
Bronze	Chiaki Ishii	(West Germany) 1971 Ludwigshafen	Men's -93 kg
Bronze	Walter Carmona	(France) 1979 Paris	Men's -86 kg
Bronze	Aurélio Miguel	(West Germany) 1987 Essen	Men's -95 kg
Silver	Aurélio Miguel	(Canada) 1993 Hamilton	Men's -95 kg
Bronze	Rogério Sampaio	(Canada) 1993 Hamilton	Men's -71 kg
Bronze	Danielle Zangrando	(Japan) 1995 Tokyo	Women's -71 kg
Silver	Aurélio Miguel	(France) 1997 Paris	Men's -95 kg
Bronze	Fúlvio Miyata	(France) 1997 Paris	Men's -60 kg
Bronze	Edinanci Silva	(France) 1997 Paris	Women's -72 kg
Bronze	Sebastian Pereira	(United Kingdom) 1999 Birmingham	Men's -73 kg
Bronze	Carlos Honorato	(Japan) 2003 Osaka	Men's -90 kg
Bronze	Mário Sabino	(Japan) 2003 Osaka	Men's -100 kg
Bronze	Edinanci Silva	(Japan) 2003 Osaka	Women's -78 kg
Gold	João Derly	(Egypt) 2005 Cairo	Men's -66 kg
Bronze	Luciano Corrêa	(Egypt) 2005 Cairo	Men's -100 kg
Gold	João Derly	(Brazil) 2007 Rio de Janeiro	Men's -66 kg
Gold	Tiago Camilo	(Brazil) 2007 Rio de Janeiro	Men's -81 kg
Gold	Luciano Corrêa	(Brazil) 2007 Rio de Janeiro	Men's -100 kg
Bronze	João Schlittler	(Brazil) 2007 Rio de Janeiro	Men's +100 kg
Silver	Leandro Cunha	(Japan) 2010 Tokyo	Men's -66 kg
Silver	Leandro Guilheiro	(Japan) 2010 Tokyo	Men's -81 kg
Silver	Mayra Aguiar	(Japan) 2010 Tokyo	Women's -78 kg
Bronze	Sarah Menezes	(Japan) 2010 Tokyo	Women's -48 kg
Silver	Leandro Cunha	(France) 2011 Paris	Men's -66 kg
Silver	Rafaela Silva	(France) 2011 Paris	Women's -57 kg
Bronze	Leandro Guilheiro	(France) 2011 Paris	Men's -81 kg
Bronze	Sarah Menezes	(France) 2011 Paris	Women's -48 kg
Bronze	Mayra Aguiar	(France) 2011 Paris	Women's -78 kg
Gold	Rafaela Silva	(Brazil) 2013 Rio de Janeiro	Women's -57 kg
Silver	Rafael Silva	(Brazil) 2013 Rio de Janeiro	Men's +100 kg
Silver	Érika Miranda	(Brazil) 2013 Rio de Janeiro	Women's -52 kg
Silver	Maria Suelen Altheman	(Brazil) 2013 Rio de Janeiro	Women's +78 kg
Bronze	Sarah Menezes	(Brazil) 2013 Rio de Janeiro	Women's -48 kg
Bronze	Mayra Aguiar	(Brazil) 2013 Rio de Janeiro	Women's -78 kg
Gold	Mayra Aguiar	(Russia) 2014 Chelyabinsk	Women's -78 kg
Silver	Maria Suelen Altheman	(Russia) 2014 Chelyabinsk	Women's +78 kg
Bronze	Rafael Silva	(Russia) 2014 Chelyabinsk	Men's +100 kg
Bronze	Érika Miranda	(Russia) 2014 Chelyabinsk	Women's -52 kg
Bronze	Victor Penalber	(Kazakhstan) 2015 Astana	Men's -81 kg
Bronze	Érika Miranda	(Kazakhstan) 2015 Astana	Women's -52 kg
Gold	Mayra Aguiar	(Hungary) 2017 Budapest	Women's -78 kg
Silver	David Moura	(Hungary) 2017 Budapest	Men's +100 kg
Bronze	Rafael Silva	(Hungary) 2017 Budapest	Men's +100 kg
Bronze	Érika Miranda	(Hungary) 2017 Budapest	Women's -52 kg
Bronze	Érika Miranda	(Azerbaijan) 2018 Baku	Women's -52 kg
Bronze	Rafaela Silva	(Japan) 2019 Tokyo	Women's -57 kg
Bronze	Mayra Aguiar	(Japan) 2019 Tokyo	Women's -78 kg
Bronze	Maria Suelen Altheman	(Hungary) 2021 Budapest	Women's +78 kg
Bronze	Beatriz Souza	(Hungary) 2021 Budapest	Women's +78 kg
Gold	Rafaela Silva	(Uzbekistan) 2022 Tashkent	Women's -57 kg
Bronze	Daniel Cargnin	(Uzbekistan) 2022 Tashkent	Men's -73 kg
Gold	Mayra Aguiar	(Uzbekistan) 2022 Tashkent	Women's -78 kg
Silver	Beatriz Souza	(Uzbekistan) 2022 Tashkent	Women's +78 kg
Bronze	Rafael Silva	(Qatar) 2023 Doha	Men's +100 kg
Bronze	Beatriz Souza	(Qatar) 2023 Doha	Women's +78 kg
Silver	Daniel Cargnin	(Hungary) 2025 Budapest	Men's -73 kg
Bronze	Shirlen Nascimento	(Hungary) 2025 Budapest	Women's -57 kg

=== Medal tables ===
==== By gender ====
Gender	Gold	Silver	Bronze	Total
Women	5	6	17	28
Men	4	8	17	29

==== By athlete ====
Athlete	Gold	Silver	Bronze	Total
Mayra Aguiar	3	1	3	7
Rafaela Silva	2	1	1	4
João Derly	2	0	0	2
Luciano Corrêa	1	0	1	2
Tiago Camilo	1	0	0	1
Aurélio Miguel	0	2	1	3
Maria Suelen Altheman	0	2	1	3
Érika Miranda	0	1	4	5
Rafael Silva	0	1	3	4
Beatriz Souza	0	1	2	3
Sarah Menezes	0	0	3	3

Only athletes with at least one gold medal or three medals

== Brazil at the Judo Team World Championships ==
Men's Team
Year	Medal	Medalists
(Belarus) 1998 Minsk	Silver	Team: Fúlvio Miyata; Henrique Guimarães; Sérgio Oliveira; Flávio Canto; Edelmar Branco Zanol; Fernando Figueiredo; Daniel Hernandes
(China) 2007 Beijing	Silver	Team: Charles Chibana; Leandro Cunha; Pedro Gueldes; Victor Penalber; Hugo Pessanha; Luciano Corrêa; João Schlittler; Flávio Canto*; Leonardo Leite*
(Japan) 2008 Tokyo	Bronze	Team: Charles Chibana; Leonardo Leite; Denílson Lourenço; Victor Penalber; Hugo Pessanha; Flávio Canto; Daniel Hernandes; Fernando Figueiredo; Eduardo Santos*; Walter Santos*
(Turkey) 2010 Antalya	Silver	Team: Alex Pombo; Bruno Mendonça; Rodrigo Maciel de Luna; Flávio Canto; Rafael Silva; David Moura*
(France) 2011 Paris	Silver	Team: Leandro Cunha; Bruno Mendonça; Leandro Guilheiro; Tiago Camilo; Rafael Silva; Felipe Kitadai*; Flávio Canto*; Luciano Corrêa*; Hugo Pessanha*; Daniel Hernandes*
(Brazil) 2012 Salvador	Bronze	Team: Luiz Revite; Bruno Mendonça; Victor Penalber; Rafael Silva; Eduardo Silva

* Judokas who participated in the qualifying only and received medals.

Women's Team
Year	Medal	Medalists
(Brazil) 2012 Salvador	Bronze	Team: Érika Miranda; Ketleyn Quadros; Rafaela Silva; Maria Portela; Maria Suelen Altheman
(Brazil) 2013 Rio de Janeiro	Silver	Team: Érika Miranda; Katherine Campos; Rafaela Silva; Maria Portela; Maria Suelen Altheman; Mariana Silva*; Mayra Aguiar*

* Judokas who participated in the qualifying only and received medals.

Mixed Team
Year	Medal	Medalists
(Hungary) 2017 Budapest	Silver	Team: Maria Suelen Altheman; Eduardo Barbosa; Eduardo Bettoni; Marcelo Contini; Érika Miranda; David Moura; Victor Penalber; Maria Portela; Ketleyn Quadros; Rafael Silva; Rafaela Silva; Beatriz Souza
(Japan) 2019 Tokyo	Bronze	Team: Maria Suelen Altheman; Eduardo Barbosa; Tamires Crude; Rafael Macedo; David Moura; Maria Portela; Ellen Santana; Eduardo Yudy Santos; Jeferson Santos Junior; Rafael Siva; Rafaela Silva; Beatriz Souza
(Hungary) 2021 Budapest	Bronze	

=== Medal table ===
Gender	Gold	Silver	Bronze	Total
Men's Team	0	4	2	6
Mixed Team	0	1	2	3
Women's Team	0	1	1	2
