= Norwegian Bowling Federation =

Norwegian ten-pin bowling congress

- Sport: Bowling
- Abbreviation: NBF
- Founded: 1962
- Headquarters: Oslo, Norway
- Location: Ullevaal Stadion
- President: Marie Paulsson Berg
- Vice president(s): Halgeir Ludvigsen
- Sponsor: Macron Sportswear

Official website
- www.bowling.no
- (Norway)

The Norwegian Bowling Federation (NBF) (Norwegian: Norges Bowlingforbund) is the national body responsible for the management and promotion of bowling in Norway. It is affiliated with the International Bowling Federation. The president is Marie Paulsson Berg, and the vice president is Halgeir Ludvigsen. The headquarters are in Oslo.
