= World Judo Championships =

Judo competition

- Current event or competition: 2026 World Judo Championships

Competition details
- Discipline: Judo
- Type: Annual
- Organiser: International Judo Federation (IJF)

History
- First edition: 1956 in Tokyo, Japan
- Editions: 39 men (2026); 30 women (2026)
- Most wins: Japan – 445 medals (194 gold medals)
- Most recent: Baku 2026
- Next edition: Astana 2027

The World Judo Championships are the highest level of international judo competition, next to the quadrennial judo events at the Summer Olympic Games. The world championships are held by the International Judo Federation annually, except the calendar years of the Summer Olympics. Qualified judoka compete in their respective categories as representatives of their home countries. Team fixtures have also been held since 1994. The men's championships first took place in 1956, though the format and periodicity of the competition have changed over time. The women’s championships first took place in 1980. The most recent edition (2026) of the World Judo Championships was held in Baku, Azerbaijan.

== History ==
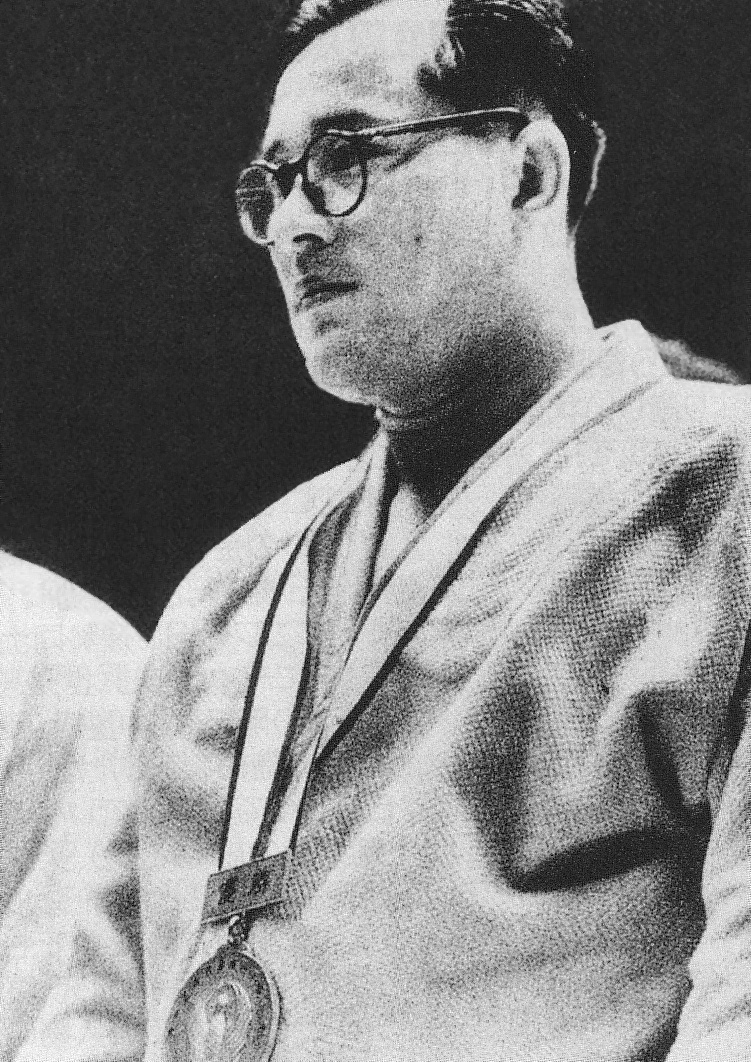
The first World Judo Champion, Shokichi Natsui in 1956

The first edition of the world championships took place in Tokyo, Japan in 1956. There were no weight classes at the time and Japanese judoka Shokichi Natsui became the first world champion in history, defeating fellow countryman Yoshihiko Yoshimatsu in the final. The second world championship was also held in Tokyo two years later, with the Japanese winning the top two spots in the competition for the second time. In 1961, the championship was held outside Japan for the first time, and Dutch judoka Anton Geesink defeated the prior world champion, Koji Sone, in Paris, France, to become the first non-Japanese world champion.

The 1965 World Judo Championships were held in Rio de Janeiro, Brazil, and weight classes were implemented for the first time with the addition of the −68 kg, −80 kg, and +80 kg categories. Judo had become an Olympic sport at the 1964 Summer Olympics held in Tokyo initially for men, and a permanent sport after a brief absence at the 1968 Summer Olympics.

Despite this progressive enlargement, it took until 1980 for women to participate in the world championships. The first women's world championships were held in New York City in 1980, and were held in alternating years as the men's championships until the 1987 World Judo Championships in Essen, where the two competitions were merged into one world championship. The mixed championships have been held biannually since 1987. On the Commonwealth Games side, Judo was added to the Commonwealth Games programme, initially as an optional sport for the first three editions in 1990, 2002 and 2014 but it is now a core sport from 2022 onwards. The women’s judo was included at the 1992 Summer Olympics. In 2005, the world championships made its debut on the African continent in Cairo, Egypt. In the International Judo Federation meeting held in Rio de Janeiro, Brazil in 2007 (during the 2007 World Judo Championships), it was decided that France would host the world championships for the fifth time in 2011.

== Weight classes ==
There are currently 16 tournaments in the world championships, with 8 weight classes for each gender.

Men
1956–1963	1965	1967–1975	1979–1997	1999–present
Open category (no weight limits)	Open category (no weight limits)			
Open category (no weight limits)	Heavyweight +80 kg	Heavyweight +93 kg	Heavyweight +95 kg	Heavyweight +100 kg
Open category (no weight limits)	Heavyweight +80 kg	Half heavyweight -93 kg	Half heavyweight -95 kg	Half heavyweight -100 kg
Open category (no weight limits)	Middleweight -80 kg	Middleweight -80 kg	Middleweight -86 kg	Middleweight -90 kg
Open category (no weight limits)	Middleweight -80 kg	Half middleweight -70 kg	Half middleweight -78 kg	Half middleweight -81 kg
Open category (no weight limits)	Lightweight -68 kg	Lightweight -63 kg	Lightweight -71 kg	Lightweight -73 kg
Open category (no weight limits)	Lightweight -68 kg	Lightweight -63 kg	Half lightweight -65 kg	Half lightweight -66 kg
Open category (no weight limits)	Lightweight -68 kg	Lightweight -63 kg	Extra lightweight -60 kg	

Women
1980–1997	1999–present
Open category (no weight limits)
Heavyweight +72 kg	Heavyweight +78 kg
Half heavyweight -72 kg	Half heavyweight -78 kg
Middleweight -66 kg	Middleweight -70 kg
Half middleweight -61 kg	Half middleweight -63 kg
Lightweight -56 kg	Lightweight -57 kg
Half lightweight -52 kg
Extra lightweight -48 kg

== Competitions by year ==
The world championships have been held on every continent except Antarctica.

=== Men's competitions ===
Number	Year	Dates	City and host country	Venue	# Countries	# Athletes	Ref.
1	1956	3 May	Tokyo, Japan	Kuramae Kokugikan	21	31	
2	1958	30 November	Tokyo, Japan	Tokyo Metropolitan Gymnasium	18	39	
3	1961	2 December	Paris, France	Stade Pierre de Coubertin	25	57	
4	1965	14–17 October	Rio de Janeiro, Brazil	Maracanãzinho	42	150	
5	1967	9–11 August	Salt Lake City, United States	University of Utah	25	115	
6	1969	23–25 October	Mexico City, Mexico	Palacio de los Deportes	39	187	
7	1971	2–4 September	Ludwigshafen, West Germany	Friedrich-Ebert-Halle	52	310	
8	1973	22–24 June	Lausanne, Switzerland	Palais de Beaulieu	50	288	
9	1975	23–25 October	Vienna, Austria	Wiener Stadthalle	46	274	
	1977	19–24 September	Barcelona, Spain	Palau dels Esports	Cancelled		(Note: The 1977 Championships were canceled due to the refusal of the host country officials to allow the Taiwanese national team to compete under the national flag of the Republic of China, thereby denying them visas. Taiwan appealed the decision of the Spanish officials to the International Judo Federation, who considered the position of the Taiwanese side to be fair and decided to cancel the 1977 Championships due to an unresolved political conflict.)
10	1979	6–9 December	Paris, France	Stade Pierre de Coubertin	54	273	
11	1981	3–6 September	Maastricht, Netherlands	Euro Hall	51	255	
12	1983	13–16 October	Moscow, Soviet Union	Lenin Palace of Sports	44	226	
13	1985	26–29 September	Seoul, South Korea	Jamsil Arena	39	189	

=== Women's competitions ===
Number	Year	Dates	City and host country	Venue	# Countries	# Athletes	Ref.
1	1980	29–30 November	New York, United States	Madison Square Garden	27	149	
2	1982	4–5 December	Paris, France	Stade Pierre de Coubertin	35	174	
3	1984	10–11 November	Vienna, Austria	Wiener Stadthalle	32	183	
4	1986	24–26 October	Maastricht, Netherlands	Geusselt Sports Hall	35	162	

=== Mixed competitions ===
Number M/W	Year	Dates	City and host country	Venue	# Countries	# Athletes	Ref.
14/5	1987	19–22 November	Essen, West Germany	Grugahalle	63	456	
15/6	1989	10–15 October	(Socialist Federal Republic of Yugoslavia) Belgrade, Yugoslavia	Pionir Hall	63	355	
16/7	1991	25–28 July	Barcelona, Spain	Palau Blaugrana	64	465	
17/8	1993	30 September – 3 October	Hamilton, Canada	Copps Coliseum	79	508	
18/9	1995	28 September – 1 October	Chiba, Japan	Makuhari Messe	100	627	
19/10	1997	9–12 October	Paris, France	Palais Omnisports de Paris-Bercy	91	585	
20/11	1999	7–10 October	Birmingham, United Kingdom	National Indoor Arena	91	619	
21/12	2001	26–29 July	Munich, Germany	Olympiahalle	89	586	
22/13	2003	11–14 September	Osaka, Japan	Osaka-jō Hall	100	631	
23/14	2005	8–11 September	Cairo, Egypt	Cairo Stadium Indoor Halls Complex	93	579	
24/15	2007	13–16 September	Rio de Janeiro, Brazil	HSBC Arena	139	743	
25/16	2009	27–30 August	Rotterdam, Netherlands	Rotterdam Ahoy	97	538	
26/17	2010	9–13 September	Tokyo, Japan	Yoyogi National Gymnasium	112	847	
27/18	2011	23–28 August	Paris, France	Palais Omnisports de Paris-Bercy	131	864	
28/19	2013	26 August – 1 September	Rio de Janeiro, Brazil	Maracanãzinho	123	673	
29/20	2014	25–31 August	Chelyabinsk, Russia	Traktor Arena	110	637	
30/21	2015	24–30 August	Astana, Kazakhstan	Alau Ice Palace	120	723	
31/22	2017	28 August – 3 September	Budapest, Hungary	László Papp Budapest Sports Arena	126	728	
32/23	2018	20–27 September	Baku, Azerbaijan	National Gymnastics Arena	124	755	
33/24	2019	25 August – 1 September	Tokyo, Japan	Nippon Budokan	143	828	
34/25	2021	6–13 June	Budapest, Hungary	László Papp Budapest Sports Arena	118	661	
35/26	2022	6–13 October	Tashkent, Uzbekistan	Humo Ice Dome	82	571	
36/27	2023	7–14 May	Doha, Qatar	Ali Bin Hamad al-Attiyah Arena	99	657	
37/28	2024	19–24 May	Abu Dhabi, United Arab Emirates	Mubadala Arena	107	658	
38/29	2025	13–20 June	Budapest, Hungary	László Papp Budapest Sports Arena	93	556	
39/30	2026	4–11 October	Baku, Azerbaijan	National Gymnastics Arena	93	622	
40/31	2027	7–14 June	Astana, Kazakhstan	Barys Arena			
41/32	2028	TBC	Lausanne, Switzerland	Vaudoise Aréna			
42/33	2029	TBC	(Georgia (country)) Tbilisi, Georgia	Tbilisi Arena			

=== Openweight competitions ===
Number	Year	Dates	City and host country	Venue	# Countries	# Athletes	Ref.
1	2008	20–21 December	Levallois-Perret, France	Marcel Cerdan Palace of Sports	18	51	
—	2009	Cancelled					
2	2011	29–30 October	Tyumen, Russia	Judo Centre	22	49	
3	2017	11–12 November	Marrakesh, Morocco	Palais des Congrès	28	58	

=== Medal tables ===
==== Men's medal count – individual events (1956–2026) ====
Rank	Nation	Gold	Silver	Bronze	Total
1	Japan	111	62	69	242
2	France	25	18	29	72
3	South Korea	25	8	47	80
4	Georgia	12	15	26	53
5	Soviet Union	11	12	33	56
6	Russia	8	14	28	50
7	Netherlands	8	11	19	38
8	Germany	5	6	12	23
9	Uzbekistan	5	4	10	19
10	Azerbaijan	4	8	21	33
11	Brazil	4	8	16	28
12	Poland	4	2	14	20
13	Cuba	3	6	9	18
14	Great Britain	3	4	13	20
15	East Germany	3	3	14	20
16	Mongolia	3	3	12	18
17	Spain	3	3	5	11
18	Greece	3	2	1	6
19	Iran	3	0	5	8
20	International Judo Federation (Note: Unlike in 2013, Majlinda Kelmendi did not compete at the 2014 World Championships under the Kosovo flag but under the International Judo Federation flag, as Russia does not recognise Kosovo's independence. Also, at the 2025 World Judo Championships, in accordance with sanctions imposed following by the 2022 Russian invasion of Ukraine, judokas from Russia were not permitted to use the name, flag, or anthem of Russia and instead participated under name and flag of the International Judo Federation (IJF).)	3	0	2	5
21	Kazakhstan	2	6	4	12
22	Hungary	2	5	11	18
23	United States	2	3	7	12
24	Czech Republic	2	1	3	6
–	Individual Neutral Athletes (Note: At the 2023 and 2024 World Championships, in accordance with sanctions imposed following by the 2022 Russian invasion of Ukraine, judokas from Russia were not permitted to use the name, flag, or anthem of Russia. They instead participated as "Individual Neutral Athletes (AIN)", their medals were not included in the official medal table.)	2	1	1	4
25	Portugal	2	0	3	5
26	Belgium	1	8	11	20
27	Ukraine	1	3	9	13
28	Israel	1	2	3	6
28	Serbia	1	2	3	6
30	Switzerland	1	2	2	5
31	Austria	1	1	4	6
32	(Russia) Russian Judo Federation (Note: At the 2021 World Championships, in accordance with a ban by the World Anti-Doping Agency (WADA) and a decision by the Court of Arbitration for Sport (CAS), judokas from Russia were not permitted to use the Russian name, flag, or anthem. They instead participated as "the team of the Russian Judo Federation (RJF)", and used the flag of the Russian Olympic Committee.)	1	1	1	3
33	Tunisia	1	0	2	3
33	Yugoslavia	1	0	2	3
35	Italy	0	7	10	17
36	West Germany	0	5	13	18
37	Canada	0	4	7	11
38	Turkey	0	3	5	8
39	North Korea	0	3	4	7
40	Estonia	0	3	1	4
41	Belarus	0	2	6	8
42	Egypt	0	2	3	5
43	Czechoslovakia	0	2	2	4
44	Moldova	0	1	5	6
45	Romania	0	1	4	5
45	Tajikistan	0	1	4	5
47	United Arab Emirates	0	1	3	4
48	Bulgaria	0	1	2	3
48	Sweden	0	1	2	3
50	Chinese Taipei	0	1	1	2
51	Algeria	0	1	0	1
51	Montenegro	0	1	0	1
51	Slovenia	0	1	0	1
54	China	0	0	3	3
55	Finland	0	0	2	2
56	Armenia	0	0	1	1
56	Kyrgyzstan	0	0	1	1
56	Latvia	0	0	1	1
56	Lithuania	0	0	1	1
Total		267	265	532	1064

==== Women's medal count – individual events (1980–2026) ====
Rank	Nation	Gold	Silver	Bronze	Total
1	Japan	64	52	57	173
2	France	35	23	58	116
3	China	20	13	14	47
4	Cuba	16	16	29	61
5	Great Britain	13	15	20	48
6	Netherlands	8	11	37	56
7	Belgium	8	9	9	26
8	Italy	8	6	13	27
9	South Korea	8	1	20	29
10	Brazil	5	6	18	29
11	North Korea	5	2	4	11
12	Germany	4	8	20	32
13	Spain	3	9	11	23
14	Canada	3	3	4	10
15	Austria	3	2	7	12
16	Mongolia	3	1	12	16
17	Colombia	3	0	3	6
18	West Germany	2	5	12	19
19	United States	2	5	10	17
20	Israel	2	3	5	10
21	Poland	2	2	11	15
22	Croatia	2	2	2	6
23	Argentina	2	2	1	5
24	Ukraine	2	1	2	5
25	Slovenia	1	5	8	14
26	Kosovo	1	1	7	9
27	Georgia	1	1	0	2
28	International Judo Federation	1	0	0	1
28	Venezuela	1	0	0	1
28	United Arab Emirates	1	0	0	1
31	Portugal	0	5	5	10
32	Russia	0	3	13	16
33	Romania	0	3	5	8
34	Australia	0	3	3	6
35	Hungary	0	2	7	9
36	Uzbekistan	0	2	0	2
37	Kazakhstan	0	1	4	5
37	Turkey	0	1	4	5
39	Bosnia and Herzegovina	0	1	1	2
39	Norway	0	1	1	2
39	Puerto Rico	0	1	1	2
39	Sweden	0	1	1	2
43	Soviet Union	0	1	0	1
44	Azerbaijan	0	0	3	3
45	Czech Republic	0	0	2	2
45	Serbia	0	0	2	2
45	Switzerland	0	0	2	2
45	Tunisia	0	0	2	2
49	Algeria	0	0	1	1
49	Belarus	0	0	1	1
49	Bulgaria	0	0	1	1
49	Chinese Taipei	0	0	1	1
49	Greece	0	0	1	1
49	New Zealand	0	0	1	1
49	Serbia and Montenegro	0	0	1	1
–	Individual Neutral Athletes	0	0	1	1
Total		229	229	458	916

==== Total medal count – individual events (1956–2026) ====
Rank	Nation	Gold	Silver	Bronze	Total
1	Japan	175	114	126	415
2	France	60	41	87	188
3	South Korea	33	9	67	109
4	China	20	13	17	50
5	Cuba	19	22	38	79
6	Netherlands	16	22	56	94
7	Great Britain	16	19	33	68
8	Georgia	13	16	26	55
9	Soviet Union	11	13	33	57
10	Belgium	9	17	20	46
11	Brazil	9	14	34	57
12	Germany	9	14	32	55
13	Russia	8	17	41	66
14	Italy	8	13	23	44
15	Spain	6	12	16	34
16	Poland	6	4	25	35
17	Mongolia	6	4	24	34
18	Uzbekistan	5	6	10	21
19	North Korea	5	5	8	18
20	Azerbaijan	4	8	24	36
21	United States	4	8	17	29
22	Austria	4	3	11	18
23	International Judo Federation	4	0	2	6
24	Canada	3	7	11	21
25	Israel	3	5	8	16
26	Ukraine	3	4	11	18
27	East Germany	3	3	14	20
28	Greece	3	2	2	7
29	Iran	3	0	5	8
30	Colombia	3	0	3	6
31	West Germany	2	10	25	37
32	Hungary	2	7	18	27
33	Kazakhstan	2	7	8	17
34	Portugal	2	5	8	15
35	Croatia	2	2	2	6
36	Argentina	2	2	1	5
37	Czech Republic	2	1	5	8
–	Individual Neutral Athletes	2	1	2	5
38	Slovenia	1	6	8	15
39	Serbia	1	2	5	8
40	Switzerland	1	2	4	7
41	Kosovo	1	1	7	9
42	United Arab Emirates	1	1	3	5
43	(Russia) Russian Judo Federation	1	1	1	3
44	Tunisia	1	0	4	5
45	Yugoslavia	1	0	2	3
46	Venezuela	1	0	0	1
47	Romania	0	4	9	13
47	Turkey	0	4	9	13
49	Australia	0	3	3	6
50	Estonia	0	3	1	4
51	Belarus	0	2	7	9
52	Egypt	0	2	3	5
52	Sweden	0	2	3	5
54	Czechoslovakia	0	2	2	4
55	Moldova	0	1	5	6
56	Tajikistan	0	1	4	5
57	Bulgaria	0	1	3	4
58	Chinese Taipei	0	1	2	3
59	Algeria	0	1	1	2
59	Bosnia and Herzegovina	0	1	1	2
59	Norway	0	1	1	2
59	Puerto Rico	0	1	1	2
63	Montenegro	0	1	0	1
64	Finland	0	0	2	2
65	Armenia	0	0	1	1
65	Kyrgyzstan	0	0	1	1
65	Latvia	0	0	1	1
65	Lithuania	0	0	1	1
65	New Zealand	0	0	1	1
65	Serbia and Montenegro	0	0	1	1
Total		496	494	990	1980

== World Team Judo Championships ==
The first World Team Judo Championships was held in 1994 as separate event and only for men's national teams. The first World Team Judo Championships for women's national team was held as separate event in 1997. Since 1998, World Team Judo Championships for men's and women's national teams have been held at the same time and venue. It were held every four years until 2006 (although promotional team events were held during 2003 and 2005 World Judo Championships) and every year from 2007 to 2015 (except 2009). Since 2011 men's and women's team competitions became the part of World Judo Championships. Starting from 2017, it were merged into mixed team competition. Judokas who participates in the individual events at the World Championships often do not participate in the team competition.

Year	Competitions		Location	Men			Women		
Year	Competitions		Location	Gold	Silver	Bronze	Gold	Silver	Bronze
1994	M	–	Paris, France	France	Germany	Japan; Russia	no women's competition		
1997	–	W	Osaka, Japan	no men's competition			Cuba	South Korea	France; Japan
1998	M	W	Minsk, Belarus	Japan	Brazil	France; Russia	Cuba	France	Belgium; China
2002	M	W	Basel, Switzerland	Japan	Georgia	France; Italy	Japan	Cuba	China; Italy
2003	M	W	Osaka, Japan	France	Japan	Iran; Russia	Japan	China	Cuba; France
2005	M	W	Cairo, Egypt	South Korea	Japan	Brazil; Georgia	France	South Korea	Algeria; Japan
2006	M	W	Paris, France	Georgia	Russia	France; South Korea	France	Cuba	China; Japan
2007	M	W	Beijing, China	Japan	Brazil	China; South Korea	China	Cuba	Japan; Mongolia
2008	M	W	Tokyo, Japan	Georgia	Uzbekistan	Brazil; Russia	Japan	France	China; Germany
2010	M	W	Antalya, Turkey	Japan	Brazil	Russia; South Korea	Netherlands	Germany	Japan; Turkey
2011	M	W	Paris, France	France	Brazil	Japan; South Korea	France	Japan	Cuba; Germany
2012	M	W	Salvador, Brazil	Russia	Japan	Brazil; Georgia	Japan	China	Brazil; Cuba
2013	M	W	Rio de Janeiro, Brazil	Georgia	Russia	Germany; Japan	Japan	Brazil	Cuba; France
2014	M	W	Chelyabinsk, Russia	Japan	Russia	Georgia; Germany	France	Mongolia	Germany; Japan
2015	M	W	Astana, Kazakhstan	Japan	South Korea	Georgia; Mongolia	Japan	Poland	Germany; Russia

=== World Team Judo Championships — Mixed team ===
Year	Location	Gold	Silver	Bronze
2017	Budapest, Hungary	Japan	Brazil	France; South Korea
2018	Baku, Azerbaijan	Japan	France	Korea; Russia
2019	Tokyo, Japan	Japan	France	Brazil; Russia
2021	Budapest, Hungary	Japan	France	Brazil; Uzbekistan
2022	Tashkent, Uzbekistan	Japan	France	Germany; Israel
2023	Doha, Qatar	Japan	France	Georgia; Netherlands
2024	Abu Dhabi, United Arab Emirates	Japan	France	Georgia; Italy
2025	Budapest, Hungary	Georgia	South Korea	Germany; Japan
2026	Baku, Azerbaijan	Japan	Russia	Georgia; Uzbekistan

=== Medal tables ===
The results of promotional team events which were held during 2003 and 2005 World Judo Championships are not included into overall statistics.

==== Men's medal count – team events (1994–2015) ====
Rank	Nation	Gold	Silver	Bronze	Total
1	Japan	6	1	3	10
2	Georgia	3	1	3	7
3	France	2	0	3	5
4	Russia	1	3	4	8
5	Brazil	0	4	2	6
6	South Korea	0	1	4	5
7	Germany	0	1	2	3
8	Uzbekistan	0	1	0	1
9	China	0	0	1	1
9	Italy	0	0	1	1
9	Mongolia	0	0	1	1
Totals (11 entries)		12	12	24	48

==== Total medal count – team events (1994–2026) ====
Rank	Nation	Gold	Silver	Bronze	Total
1	Japan	19	2	9	30
2	France	5	8	6	19
3	Georgia	4	1	6	11
4	Cuba	2	3	3	8
5	Russia	1	4	7	12
6	China	1	1	5	7
7	Netherlands	1	0	1	2
8	Brazil	0	6	5	11
9	South Korea	0	3	5	8
10	Germany	0	2	8	10
11	Mongolia	0	1	2	3
11	Uzbekistan	0	1	2	3
13	Poland	0	1	0	1
14	Italy	0	0	3	3
15	Belgium	0	0	1	1
15	Israel	0	0	1	1
15	Korea (Note: At the 2018 World Championships, judokas from North Korea and South Korea completed for unified Korean team and won bronze medals in the Mixed team competition.)	0	0	1	1
15	Turkey	0	0	1	1
Totals (18 entries)		33	33	66	132

==== Women's medal count – team events (1997–2015) ====
Rank	Nation	Gold	Silver	Bronze	Total
1	Japan	5	1	5	11
2	France	3	2	2	7
3	Cuba	2	3	3	8
4	China	1	1	4	6
5	Netherlands	1	0	0	1
6	Germany	0	1	4	5
7	Brazil	0	1	1	2
7	Mongolia	0	1	1	2
9	Poland	0	1	0	1
9	South Korea	0	1	0	1
11	Belgium	0	0	1	1
11	Italy	0	0	1	1
11	Russia	0	0	1	1
11	Turkey	0	0	1	1
Totals (14 entries)		12	12	24	48

==== Mixed medal count – team events (2017–2026) ====
Rank	Nation	Gold	Silver	Bronze	Total
1	Japan	8	0	1	9
2	Georgia	1	0	3	4
3	France	0	6	1	7
4	Brazil	0	1	2	3
4	Russia	0	1	2	3
6	South Korea	0	1	1	2
7	Germany	0	0	2	2
7	Uzbekistan	0	0	2	2
9	Israel	0	0	1	1
9	Italy	0	0	1	1
9	Korea	0	0	1	1
9	Netherlands	0	0	1	1
Totals (12 entries)		9	9	18	36

== All-time medal count ==
List of World Judo Championships medalists

Updated after the 2026 World Judo Championships.

This table include all medals in the individual and team competitions won at the World Judo Championships as well as at the separate World Team Judo Championships and separate World Judo Open Championships.

Rank	Nation	Gold	Silver	Bronze	Total
1	Japan	194	116	135	445
2	France	65	49	93	207
3	South Korea	33	12	72	117
4	Cuba	21	25	41	87
5	China	21	14	22	57
6	Netherlands	17	22	57	96
7	Georgia	17	17	32	66
8	Great Britain	16	19	33	68
9	Soviet Union	11	13	33	57
10	Russia	9	21	48	78
11	Brazil	9	20	39	68
12	Belgium	9	17	21	47
13	Germany	9	16	40	65
14	Italy	8	13	26	47
15	Spain	6	12	16	34
16	Mongolia	6	5	26	37
17	Poland	6	5	25	36
18	Uzbekistan	5	7	12	24
19	North Korea	5	5	8	18
20	Azerbaijan	4	8	24	36
21	United States	4	8	17	29
22	Austria	4	3	11	18
23	International Judo Federation	4	0	2	6
24	Canada	3	7	11	21
25	Israel	3	5	9	17
26	Ukraine	3	4	11	18
27	East Germany	3	3	14	20
28	Greece	3	2	2	7
29	Iran	3	0	5	8
30	Colombia	3	0	3	6
31	West Germany	2	10	25	37
32	Hungary	2	7	18	27
33	Kazakhstan	2	7	8	17
34	Portugal	2	5	8	15
35	Croatia	2	2	2	6
36	Argentina	2	2	1	5
37	Czech Republic	2	1	5	8
–	Individual Neutral Athletes	2	1	2	5
38	Slovenia	1	6	8	15
39	Serbia	1	2	5	8
40	Switzerland	1	2	4	7
41	Kosovo	1	1	7	9
42	United Arab Emirates	1	1	3	5
43	(Russia) Russian Judo Federation	1	1	1	3
44	Tunisia	1	0	4	5
45	Yugoslavia	1	0	2	3
46	Venezuela	1	0	0	1
47	Turkey	0	4	10	14
48	Romania	0	4	9	13
49	Australia	0	3	3	6
50	Estonia	0	3	1	4
51	Belarus	0	2	7	9
52	Egypt	0	2	3	5
52	Sweden	0	2	3	5
54	Czechoslovakia	0	2	2	4
55	Moldova	0	1	5	6
56	Tajikistan	0	1	4	5
57	Bulgaria	0	1	3	4
58	Chinese Taipei	0	1	2	3
59	Algeria	0	1	1	2
59	Bosnia and Herzegovina	0	1	1	2
59	Norway	0	1	1	2
59	Puerto Rico	0	1	1	2
63	Montenegro	0	1	0	1
64	Finland	0	0	2	2
65	Armenia	0	0	1	1
65	Korea	0	0	1	1
65	Kyrgyzstan	0	0	1	1
65	Latvia	0	0	1	1
65	Lithuania	0	0	1	1
65	New Zealand	0	0	1	1
65	Serbia and Montenegro	0	0	1	1
Totals (71 entries)		529	527	1,056	2,112

== Multiple gold medalists ==
Boldface denotes active judokas and highest medal count among all judokas (including these who not included in these tables) per type.

=== Men ===
==== Individual events ====
Rank	Judoka	Country	Weights	From	To	Gold	Silver	Bronze	Total
1	**Teddy Riner**	France	+100 kg / Open	2007	2023	**11**	1	–	**12**
2	**Hifumi Abe**	Japan	−66 kg	2017	2026	5	–	2	7
3	**Tato Grigalashvili**	Georgia	−81 kg	2021	2026	4	2	–	6
4	Naoya Ogawa	Japan	+95 kg / Open	1987	1995	4	–	3	7
5	Naohisa Takatō	Japan	−60 kg	2013	2022	4	–	1	5
6	David Douillet	France	+95 kg / Open	1993	1997	4	–	–	4
6	Shōzō Fujii	Japan	−80 kg / −78 kg	1971	1979	4	–	–	4
6	Yasuhiro Yamashita	Japan	+95 kg / Open	1979	1983	4	–	–	4
9	Ilias Iliadis	Greece	−90 kg	2005	2014	3	2	1	6
10	Alexander Mikhaylin	Russia	−100 kg / +100 kg / Open	1999	2011	3	1	3	7

==== All events ====
Rank	Judoka	Country	Events	From	To	Gold	Silver	Bronze	Total
1	**Teddy Riner**	France	+100 kg / Open / Team	2007	2023	**12**	1	1 #	**14 #**
2	Soichi Hashimoto	Japan	−73 kg / Team	2017	2023	7 *##	2	2	11 *##
3	Shōhei Ōno	Japan	−73 kg / Team	2013	2019	6 *	–	1	7 *
4	**Goki Tajima**	Japan	−90 kg / Team	2022	2026	5 *#	2	1 *	8 **#
5	Masashi Ebinuma	Japan	−66 kg / Team	2011	2015	5	1	1	7
5	Riki Nakaya	Japan	−73 kg / Team	2011	2017	5 **	1	1 *	7 ***
7	**Hifumi Abe**	Japan	−66 kg	2017	2026	5	–	2	7
7	**Sanshiro Murao**	Japan	−90 kg / Team	2019	2026	5 #	–	2	7 #
9	David Douillet	France	+95 kg / Open / Team	1993	1997	5 *	–	–	5 *
10	Alexander Mikhaylin	Russia	−100 kg / +100 kg / Open / Team	1998	2013	4	3 *	5	12 *

# including one medal of the World Team Championships won as reserve
* including one medal of the World Team Championships won for participation in the qualifying only
*# including one medal of the World Team Championships won for participation in the qualifying only and one won as reserve
** including two medals of the World Team Championships won for participation in the qualifying only
*## including one medal of the World Team Championships won for participation in the qualifying only and two won as reserve
**# including two medals of the World Team Championships won for participation in the qualifying only and one won as reserve
*** including three medals of the World Team Championships won for participation in the qualifying only

=== Women ===
==== Individual events ====
Rank	Judoka	Country	Weights	From	To	Gold	Silver	Bronze	Total
1	Ryōko Tani (Tamura)	Japan	−48 kg	1991	2007	**7**	–	1	8
1	Tong Wen	China	+78 kg / Open	2001	2011	**7**	–	1	8
3	Ingrid Berghmans	Belgium	+72 kg / −72 kg / Open	1980	1989	6	4	1	**11**
4	**Clarisse Agbegnenou**	France	−63 kg	2013	2024	6	2	1	9
5	**Uta Abe**	Japan	−52 kg	2018	2026	6	–	–	6
6	Gao Fenglian	China	+72 kg / Open	1984	1989	4	1	1	6
6	Kye Sun-hui	North Korea	−52 kg / −57 kg	1997	2007	4	1	1	6
8	Noriko Anno	Japan	+72 kg / −72 kg / −78 kg	1993	2003	4	1	–	5
8	Karen Briggs	Great Britain	−48 kg	1982	1991	4	1	–	5
10	Driulis González	Cuba	−56 kg / −57 kg / −63 kg	1993	2007	3	2	2	7

==== All events ====
Rank	Judoka	Country	Events	From	To	Gold	Silver	Bronze	Total
1	**Clarisse Agbegnenou**	France	−63 kg / Team	2011	2024	**8 #**	3 *	3 *	14 **#
2	Tong Wen	China	+78 kg / Open / Team	2001	2011	**8**	–	2	10
3	**Momo Tamaoki**	Japan	−57 kg / Team	2018	2026	7 *****#	2	2	11 *****#
4	Ryōko Tani (Tamura)	Japan	−48 kg	1991	2007	7	–	1	8
5	**Akira Sone**	Japan	+78 kg / Team	2017	2026	7 **###	–	–	7 **###
6	Ingrid Berghmans	Belgium	+72 kg / −72 kg / Open	1980	1989	6	4	1	11
7	**Uta Abe**	Japan	−52 kg	2018	2026	6	–	–	6
7	Chizuru Arai	Japan	−70 kg / Team	2015	2019	6 #	–	–	6 #
9	Driulis González	Cuba	−56 kg / −57 kg / −63 kg / Team	1993	2007	5	4	2	11
10	Misato Nakamura	Japan	−52 kg / Team	2006	2015	5	2	1	8

# including one medal of the World Team Championships won as reserve
* including one medal of the World Team Championships won for participation in the qualifying only
**# including two medals of the World Team Championships won for participation in the qualifying only and one won as reserve
**### including two medals of the World Team Championships won for participation in the qualifying only and three won as reserve
*****# including five medals of the World Team Championships won for participation in the qualifying only and one won as reserve

== Records ==
Category	Men	Women
Youngest world champion	(France) Teddy Riner : 18 years and 159 days (in 2007)	(Ukraine) Daria Bilodid : 17 years and 345 days (in 2018)
Oldest world champion	(France) Teddy Riner : 34 years and 36 days (in 2023)	(Cuba) Driulis González : 33 years and 358 days (in 2007)

== Video footage ==
- World Championships 2013 in Rio de Janeiro
- World Championships 2012 in Salvador
- World Championships 2011 in Paris
- World Championships 2010 in Tokyo
- World Championships 2009 in Rotterdam
- World Championships 2007 in Rio de Janeiro
- World Championships 2005 in Cairo
- World Championships 2003 in Osaka
- World Championships 2001 in Munich
- World Championships 1999 in Birmingham
- World Championships 1997 in Paris
- World Championships 1995 in Chiba
- World Championships 1993 in Hamilton
- World Championships 1991 in Barcelona
- World Championships 1989 in Belgrade
- World Championships 1987 in Essen
- World Championships 1985 in Seoul
- World Championships 1983 in Moscow
- World Championships 1981 in Maastricht
- World Championships 1980 in New York
- World Championships 1979 in Paris
- World Championships 1961 in Paris
- World Championships 1956 in Tokyo
