= List of judo organizations =

This is a list of Judo organizations.

== Worldwide governing bodies ==
Name	Abbreviation	Established	Website
International Judo Federation	IJF		
World Judo Federation	WJF		
International Budo Federation Judo Department			
International Martial Arts Federation	IMAF		

== Continental bodies of the IJF ==
Region	Name	Abbreviation	Affiliation	Established	Website	Info
Africa	African Judo Union	AJU	IJF			
Americas	Pan American Judo Confederation	PCJ	IJF	2009		
Americas	Pan American Judo Union	PJU	WJF	1952		Until 2009 member of the IJF
Asia	Judo Union of Asia	JUA	IJF			
Europe	European Judo Union	EJU	IJF			
Oceania	Oceania Judo Union	OJU	IJF			

== National bodies ==
IJF consists of 205 member organizations and two sanctioned national bodies. This list includes organizations with different affiliations.

Country	Name	Abbreviation	Affiliation	Regional affiliation	Established	Website	Info
Andorra	Federacio Andorrana de Judo i Jujitsu		IJF	EJU			
Armenia	Judo Federation of Armenia		IJF	EJU	1992		
Austria	Österreichischer Judoverband	ÖJV	IJF	EJU	1947		
Australia	Judo Federation of Australia	JFA	IJF	OJU	1952		largest judo association in Australia
Australia	Australian Kodokan Judo Association	AKJA	WJF	-			
Canada	Judo Canada		IJF	PCJ	1956		
Finland	Finnish Judo Federation		IJF	EJU			
France	Fédération Française de Judo, Jujitsu et Disciplines Associées	FFJDA	IJF	EJU	December 5, 1946		French Federation of Judo, Jujitsu and Related Disciplines
France	Collège Indépendant de Judo traditionnel et d’Arts Martiaux	CIJAM	-				Independent College of traditional Judo and Martial Arts
France	École Française de Judo/Jujutsu Traditionnel	EFJJT	-				French School (in French Ecole) of Traditional Judo/Jujutsu
France	Fédération Internationale Autonome de Junomichi	FIAJ	-				Federation International Autonomous Junomichi
Georgia	Georgian Judo Federation		IJF	EJU			
Germany	German Judo Federation	DJB	IJF	EJU	August 8, 1953		
Germany	German Dan Colleague_{[de]}	DDK	-				DDK was a member of the DJB
Germany	Deutsche Judo Föderation		WJF	-			
Iceland	Judo Federation of Iceland		IJF	EJU			
Ireland	Irish Judo Association		IJF	EJU			
Italy	Italian Federation of Judo, Wrestling, Karate and Martial Arts		IJF	EJU	1902		
Italy	Federazione Italiana Judo Tradizionale		WJF	-			
Japan	All Japan Judo Federation		IJF	JUA	May 1949		-
Luxembourg	Fédération Luxembourgeoise Judo		IJF	EJU			
Netherlands	Judo Bond Nederland	JBN	IJF	EJU			
Norway	Norwegian Judo Federation		IJF	EJU			
Philippines	Philippine Judo Federation, Inc		IJF	JUA			
Spain	Real Federación Española de Judo y Deportes Asociados	RFEJYDA	IJF	EJU			Royal Spanish Federation of Judo and Related Sports
Sweden	Swedish Judo Federation		IJF	EJU			
Sweden	Traditional kodokan Judo Sweden		WJF	-			
United Kingdom	British Judo Association	BJA	IJF	EJU			largest judo association in Great Britain
United Kingdom	British Judo Council	BJC	-				Affiliated to the BJA
United Kingdom	Amateur Judo Association	AJA	-				Affiliated to the BJA
United Kingdom	Judo For All UK	JFA-UK	WJF	-			
United States	United States Judo, Inc.	USAJ	IJF	PCJ	2009		national governing body of judo pursuant to the Ted Stevens Olympic and Amateur Sports Act (36 U.S. Code § 220501 et seq). A member organization of the U.S. Olympic Committee, USAJ is responsible for the development, support and selection of Olympic, Pan American and World Championship Teams, and is affiliated to the Pan American Judo Confederation and International Judo Federation.
United States	United States Judo Federation	USJF	-		1952		parent organizations of the USAJ
United States	United States Judo Association	USJA	-		1969		parent organizations of the USAJ
United States	Amateur Athletic Union-Judo	AAU-Judo	WJF	PJU			
United States	American Judo and Jujitsu Federation	AJJF	-				
Vietnam	Vietnam Judo Association		IJF	JUA			

== Members of National bodies ==
Country	Name	Abbreviation	Affiliation	Established	Website	Info
United Kingdom	JudoScotland		BJA	1988		Representative in Scotland of the BJA
United Kingdom	Welsh Judo Association		BJA			Representative in Wales of the BJA
United Kingdom	Northern Ireland Judo Federation		BJA			Representative in Northern Ireland of the BJA
Germany	Brandenburgischer Judo Verband		DJB			
Germany	Hamburger Judo-Verband		DJB			
Germany	Judo-Verband Berlin		DJB			

== Others ==
Country	Name	Abbreviation	Established	Website
Japan	Kodokan Judo Institute			
Brazil	Instituto Reação			

== See also ==
- Judo by country
- List of boxing organisations
- List of kickboxing organizations
