= Judo by country =

This is a list of articles on the state of Judo in various countries around the world.

- Judo in Brazil
- Judo in Canada
- Judo in France
- Judo in the United Kingdom
- Judo in the United States

== See also ==
- List of judo organizations#National bodies
