= International Judo Federation =

International governing body for Judo

- Sport: Judo
- Category: Sports federation
- Jurisdiction: International
- Abbreviation: IJF
- Founded: 11 July 1951; 75 years ago in London
- Headquarters: Budapest, Hungary
- President: Marius Vizer

Official website
- ijf.org

The International Judo Federation (IJF) is the international governing body for judo, founded in July 1951. Today the IJF has 200 National Federations on all continents.

== History ==
On July 11, 1951 in London, the representatives of the European Judo Union (Great Britain, France, Italy, Belgium, The Netherlands, Germany, Austria and Switzerland) received the candidacy of Argentina and the International Judo Federation was created. The Italian Aldo Torti became the first President of the IJF. Countries from four continents were affiliated over the next ten years.

Since 2009, IJF has organized yearly World Championships and the World Judo Tour consisting of five Grand Prix, four Grand Slams, a master tournament, and a Continental open tournament.

In March 2009 it replaced the Pan American Judo Union with the Pan American Judo Confederation.

The IJF initially named Russian President Vladimir Putin its honorary president and IJF Ambassador in 2008. However, that status was suspended and then stripped in 2022, in reaction to the Russian invasion of Ukraine.

=== Russia and Belarus suspension ===
In reaction to the 2022 Russian invasion of Ukraine, the IJF cancelled all competitions in Russia, but allowed their athletes to compete as neutrals in individual and team competitions.

IJF President Marius Vizer, a long-time close friend of Russian President Vladimir Putin, wanted to let Russians and Belarusians continue to compete as neutral athletes despite the invasion of Ukraine and subsequent Ukrainian pressure to suspend them entirely. Ultimately, both national federations withdrew on their own accord, until June 2022 when they returned. Ukraine boycotted IJF events beginning in June 2022 because the Russian team was allowed to compete in and entered competitions. Judo is one of the few Olympic sports which goes against the recommendation of the International Olympic Committee.

The IJF announced on 29 April 2023, the last day of event registration for the 2023 World Championships, that Russian and Belarusian athletes would be allowed to participate as individual neutral athletes following background checks. Following the announcement, twenty Russian and Belarusian athletes were registered and entered into the championships. Of the twenty, at least five were reported to have ties with the Russian Armed Forces, despite the IOC's suggestion to deny participation of athletes who are contracted to the Russian or Belarusian military or national security agencies. In protest, the Ukrainian team withdrew from the championships.

In May 2025, the IJF allowed Belarusian athletes to compete in tournaments under the country's flag, and Russian athletes in early November.

== Events ==
- World Judo Championships
- World Judo Juniors Championships (1974 to 2011 U20 / 2012 to now U21)
- World Judo Cadets Championships (U18)
- World Veterans Judo Championships (30+ to 80+ in 11 Age Group)
- World Kata Judo Championships [ja]
- IJF World Tour (Masters, Grand Slam, Grand Prix, Continental Open)
- Judo at the Summer Olympics (men since 1964), (women since 1992)
- Judo at the Summer Paralympics (men since 1988), (women since 2004)
- Judo at the Commonwealth Games (optional in 1990, 2002 and 2014), (core since 2022)

== Presidents of the IJF ==
- Aldo Torti, Italy, 1951
- Risei Kano, son of Kanō Jigorō, Japan, 1952–1965
- Charles Palmer, United Kingdom, 1965–1979
- Shigeyoshi Matsumae, Japan, 1979–1987
- Sarkis Kaloghlian, Argentina, 1987–1989
- Lawrie Hargrave, New Zealand, 1989–1991
- Luis Baguena, Spain, 1991–1995
- Park Yong-sung, South Korea, 1995–2007
- Marius Vizer, Romania/Austria, 2007–present
