= Judo at the 2010 Central American and Caribbean Games =

Judo competition

- Location: Mayagüez
- Dates: 18–21 July

The judo competition at the 2010 Central American and Caribbean Games was being held in Mayagüez, Puerto Rico.

The tournament was scheduled to be held from 18 to 21 July at the Aguada Coliseum in Aguada.

== Medal summary ==
=== Men's events ===
Event	Gold	Silver	Bronze
−55 kg	Enrique Martinez (PUR)	Armando Maita (VEN)	Robert Gomez (DOM); Fredy Lopez (ESA)
−60 kg	Javier Guédez (VEN)	John Futtinico (COL)	Nabor Castillo (MEX); Juan Román (PUR)
−66 kg	Ricardo Valderrama (VEN)	Lwilli Santana (DOM)	Carlos Figueroa (ESA); Melvin Mendez (PUR)
−73 kg	Augusto Miranda (PUR)	Antonio Rivas (VEN)	Fausto Bivieca (DOM); Osman Murillo (CRC)
−81 kg	Mervin Rodriguez (VEN)	Gadiel Miranda (PUR)	Pedro Castro (COL); Mailtis Cespedes (DOM)
−90 kg	Isao Cardenas (MEX)	Amado Santos (DOM)	Jose Camacho (VEN); Alexis Chiclana (PUR)
−100 kg	Carlos Santiago (PUR)	Sergio García (MEX)	Melvin Castro (DOM); Anthony Peña (VEN)
+100 kg	Ramón Flores (MEX)	Pablo Figueroa (PUR)	Pedro Pineda (VEN); José Vásquez (DOM)
Open	Pedro Castro (COL)	Ramón Flores (MEX)	José Camacho (VEN); Carlos Santiago (PUR)
Team	Venezuela (José Camacho, Jorge Colmenares, Javier Guédez, Anthony Peña, Mervin Rodríguez, Ricardo Valderrama)	Dominican Republic (Fausto Bivieca, Melvin Castro, Mailtis Cespedes, Cristhian Delgado, Wander Mateo, Lwilli Santana, Amado Santos, José Vasquez)	Mexico(Eduardo Avila, Isao Cardenas, Fransco Carreon, Nabor Castillo, Fermin Delgado, Ramón Flores, Sergio García, José Hipólito); Puerto Rico (Alexis Chiclana, Pablo Figueroa, Melvin Méndez, Augusto Miranda, Gadiel Miranda, Juan Román, Carlos Santiago)

=== Women's events ===
Event	Gold	Silver	Bronze
−44 kg	Isandrina Sanchez (DOM)	Evelin Rodriguez (GUA)	Steffanny Garatejo (COL); Andrea Gómez (VEN)
−48 kg	Edna Carrillo (MEX)	Diana de Jesus (DOM)	Luz Alvarez (COL); Linouse Desravine (HAI)
−52 kg	Yulieth Sánchez (COL)	Andrea Cárdenas (MEX)	María García (DOM); Karina Tapia (CRC)
−57 kg	Yadinis Amarís (COL)	Ange Jean (HAI)	Ana León (MEX); Flor Velasquez (VEN)
−63 kg	Jessica García (PUR)	Ysis Barreto (VEN)	Karina Acosta (MEX); Diana Velasco (COL)
−70 kg	María Pérez (PUR)	Veronica Mendoza (ESA)	Andrea Menegazzo (GUA); Maria Rojas (VEN)
−78 kg	Anny Cortés (COL)	Keivi Pinto (VEN)	Leidi Germán (DOM); Mirla Nolberto (GUA)
+78 kg	Melissa Mojica (PUR)	Vanessa Zambotti (MEX)	Giovanna Blanco (VEN); Mabel Henriquez (DOM)
Open	Melissa Mojica (PUR)	Vanessa Zambotti (MEX)	Giovanna Blanco (VEN)
Team	Venezuela (Ysis Barreto, Giovanna Blanco, Diana Ortíz, Keivi Pinto, Maria Rojas, Flor Velásquez)	Puerto Rico (Margaret de Jesús, Jessica García, Melissa Mojica, Julie Rivas, Keishla Vázquez)	Colombia (Luz Álvarez, Yadinis Amarís, Anny Cortés, Yulieth Sánchez, Diana Velasco); Mexico (Karina Acosta, Andrea Cárdenas, Edna Carrillo, Ana León, Lizbeth León, Lenia Ruvalcaba, Sandra Sánchez, Vanessa Zambotti)
