= 2012 Pan American Judo Championships =

Judo competition

2012 Judo Pan American Judo Championships
- Venue: Montreal
- Location: Montreal, Canada
- Dates: 27–29 April 2012
- Competitors: 149 from 23 nations

Competition at external databases
- Links: IJF • JudoInside

The 2012 Pan American Judo Championships was held in Montreal, Canada from April 27–29, 2012.

== Medal table ==
* Host nation (Canada)

Rank	Nation	Gold	Silver	Bronze	Total
1	Brazil (BRA)	9	2	3	14
2	Cuba (CUB)	4	4	3	11
3	Canada (CAN)*	1	4	3	8
4	Ecuador (ECU)	1	1	0	2
5	Colombia (COL)	0	2	4	6
6	Argentina (ARG)	0	1	3	4
7	Puerto Rico (PUR)	0	1	1	2
8	United States (USA)	0	0	4	4
9	Venezuela (VEN)	0	0	3	3
10	Mexico (MEX)	0	0	2	2
11	Chile (CHI)	0	0	1	1
11	Dominican Republic (DOM)	0	0	1	1
11	El Salvador (SLV)	0	0	1	1
11	Peru (PER)	0	0	1	1
Totals (14 entries)		15	15	30	60

=== Men's events ===
Event	Gold	Silver	Bronze
Super extra-lightweight (55 kg)	Cristhian Toala; Ecuador (ECU)	Mahdi Zeghir; Canada (CAN)	Fredy Lopez; El Salvador (SLV)
Super extra-lightweight (55 kg)	Cristhian Toala; Ecuador (ECU)	Mahdi Zeghir; Canada (CAN)	Nathan Kearney; United States (USA)
Extra-lightweight (60 kg)	Felipe Kitadai; Brazil (BRA)	Sergio Pessoa; Canada (CAN)	Javier Guédez; Venezuela (VEN)
Extra-lightweight (60 kg)	Felipe Kitadai; Brazil (BRA)	Sergio Pessoa; Canada (CAN)	Hernan Birbrier; Argentina (ARG)
Half-lightweight (66 kg)	Leandro Cunha; Brazil (BRA)	Sasha Mehmedovic; Canada (CAN)	Bolen Bradford; United States (USA)
Half-lightweight (66 kg)	Leandro Cunha; Brazil (BRA)	Sasha Mehmedovic; Canada (CAN)	Ricardo Valderrama; Venezuela (VEN)
Lightweight (73 kg)	Ronald Girones; Cuba (CUB)	Bruno Mendonça; Brazil (BRA)	Nicholas Delpopolo; United States (USA)
Lightweight (73 kg)	Ronald Girones; Cuba (CUB)	Bruno Mendonça; Brazil (BRA)	Alejandro Clara; Argentina (ARG)
Half-middleweight (81 kg)	Leandro Guilheiro; Brazil (BRA)	Antoine Valois-Fortier; Canada (CAN)	Pedro Castro; Colombia (COL)
Half-middleweight (81 kg)	Leandro Guilheiro; Brazil (BRA)	Antoine Valois-Fortier; Canada (CAN)	Emmanuel Lucenti; Argentina (ARG)
Middleweight (90 kg)	Alexandre Emond; Canada (CAN)	Asley González; Cuba (CUB)	Mervin Rodriguez; Venezuela (VEN)
Middleweight (90 kg)	Alexandre Emond; Canada (CAN)	Asley González; Cuba (CUB)	Eduardo Silva; Brazil (BRA)
Half-heavyweight (100 kg)	Renan Nunes; Brazil (BRA)	Cristian Schmidt; Argentina (ARG)	Italo Cordova; Chile (CHI)
Half-heavyweight (100 kg)	Renan Nunes; Brazil (BRA)	Cristian Schmidt; Argentina (ARG)	Oreydi Despaigne; Cuba (CUB)
Heavyweight (+100 kg)	Rafael Silva; Brazil (BRA)	Óscar Brayson; Cuba (CUB)	Carlos Zegarra; Peru (PER)
Heavyweight (+100 kg)	Rafael Silva; Brazil (BRA)	Óscar Brayson; Cuba (CUB)	Anthony Turner; United States (USA)

=== Women's events ===
Event	Gold	Silver	Bronze
Extra-lightweight (48 kg)	Dayaris Mestre Alvarez; Cuba (CUB)	Sarah Menezes; Brazil (BRA)	Edna Carrillo; Mexico (MEX)
Extra-lightweight (48 kg)	Dayaris Mestre Alvarez; Cuba (CUB)	Sarah Menezes; Brazil (BRA)	Luz Álvarez; Colombia (COL)
Half-lightweight (52 kg)	Érika Miranda; Brazil (BRA)	Yulieth Sánchez; Colombia (COL)	Yanet Bermoy; Cuba (CUB)
Half-lightweight (52 kg)	Érika Miranda; Brazil (BRA)	Yulieth Sánchez; Colombia (COL)	Maria Garcia; Dominican Republic (DOM)
Lightweight (57 kg)	Rafaela Silva; Brazil (BRA)	Yadinis Amarís; Colombia (COL)	Joliane Melançon; Canada (CAN)
Lightweight (57 kg)	Rafaela Silva; Brazil (BRA)	Yadinis Amarís; Colombia (COL)	Yurisleidy Lupetey; Cuba (CUB)
Half-middleweight (63 kg)	Yaritza Abel; Cuba (CUB)	Estefania Garcia; Ecuador (ECU)	Mariana Silva; Brazil (BRA)
Half-middleweight (63 kg)	Yaritza Abel; Cuba (CUB)	Estefania Garcia; Ecuador (ECU)	Jessica Garcia; Puerto Rico (PUR)
Middleweight (70 kg)	Maria Portela; Brazil (BRA)	Onix Cortés; Cuba (CUB)	Yuri Alvear; Colombia (COL)
Middleweight (70 kg)	Maria Portela; Brazil (BRA)	Onix Cortés; Cuba (CUB)	Kelita Zupancic; Canada (CAN)
Half-heavyweight (78 kg)	Mayra Aguiar; Brazil (BRA)	Yalennis Castillo; Cuba (CUB)	Amy Cotton; Canada (CAN)
Half-heavyweight (78 kg)	Mayra Aguiar; Brazil (BRA)	Yalennis Castillo; Cuba (CUB)	Anny Cortés; Colombia (COL)
Heavyweight (+78 kg)	Idalys Ortiz; Cuba (CUB)	Melissa Mojica; Puerto Rico (PUR)	Vanessa Zambotti; Mexico (MEX)
Heavyweight (+78 kg)	Idalys Ortiz; Cuba (CUB)	Melissa Mojica; Puerto Rico (PUR)	Maria Suelen Altheman; Brazil (BRA)
