= Judo at the 2014 Central American and Caribbean Games =

Judo competition

- Venue: World Trade Center Veracruz
- Location: Veracruz, Mexico
- Dates: 20–23 November

The judo competition at the 2014 Central American and Caribbean Games was held in Veracruz, Mexico.

The tournament was scheduled to be held from 20 to 23 November at the World Trade Center Veracruz.

== Medal summary ==
=== Men's events ===
Event	Gold	Silver	Bronze
−55 kg	Leonardo Merino (CUB)	Enrique Martinez (PUR)	David Garcia (MEX); Jesus Aguero (VEN)
−60 kg	Janier Pena (CUB)	Abel Montero (DOM)	Nabor Castillo (MEX); John Fittinico (COL)
−66 kg	Sergio Mattey (VEN)	Wander Mateo (DOM)	Jesus Chaparro (MEX); Gilberto Solar (CUB)
−73 kg	Magdiel Estrada (CUB)	Augusto Miranda (PUR)	David Tavera (MEX); Wlunkis Herrera (VEN)
−81 kg	Pedro Castro (COL)	Iván Silva (CUB)	Gadiel Miranda (PUR); Marcos Fiquereo (DOM)
−90 kg	Isao Cardenas (MEX)	Andy Granda (CUB)	Alexis Chiclana (PUR); Mervin Rodriguez (VEN)
−100 kg	José Armenteros (CUB)	Sergio García (MEX)	Christopher George (TRI); Nelson Lopez (VEN)
+100 kg	Pedro Pineda (VEN)	Óscar Brayson (CUB)	Ramón Pileta (HON); Rafael Ferrer (PUR)
Team	Cuba (CUB); Janier Pena; Magdiel Estrada; Iván Silva; Andy Granda; José Armenteros; Gilberto Solar; Óscar Brayson	Venezuela (VEN); Javier Guédez; Elias Pinero; Mervin Rodriguez; Nelson Lopez; Sergio Mattey; Pedro Pineda; Wlunkis Herrera; Jesus Aguero	Puerto Rico (PUR); Jeffrey Ruiz; Augusto Miranda; Gadiel Miranda; Alexis Chiclana; Rafael Ferrer; Angel Dones; Dominican Republic (DOM); Wander Mateo; Lwilli Santana; Marcos Fiquereo; Cristhian Gomera; Jesse de Leon; Abel Montero; José Vásquez

=== Women's events ===
Event	Gold	Silver	Bronze
−44 kg	Dayaris Mestre (CUB)	Sandra Sánchez (MEX)	Naibet Chirinos (VEN); Evelyn Solis (GUA)
−48 kg	Maria Laborde (CUB)	Edna Carrillo (MEX)	Diana Ortiz (VEN); Luz Álvarez (COL)
−52 kg	Yanet Bermoy (CUB)	María García (DOM)	Mónica Hernández (MEX); Linouse Desravine (HAI)
−57 kg	Aliuska Ojeda (CUB)	Luisa Jiménez (DOM)	Sayra Laguna (NCA); Anriquelis Barrios (VEN)
−63 kg	Maricet Espinosa (CUB)	Andrea Gutiérrez (MEX)	Diana Velasco (COL); Juana Villanueva (DOM)
−70 kg	Yuri Alvear (COL)	Onix Cortés (CUB)	Elvismar Rodríguez (VEN); Andrea Poo (MEX)
−78 kg	Yalennis Castillo (CUB)	Karen León (VEN)	Eliveri Villanueva (DOM); Miriam Gonzalez (MEX)
+78 kg	Idalys Ortíz (CUB)	Melissa Mojica (PUR)	Vanessa Zambotti (MEX); Emileidys López (VEN)
Team	Cuba (CUB); Dayaris Mestre; Yanet Bermoy; Aliuska Ojeda; Maricet Espinosa; Onix Cortés; Yalennis Castillo; Idalys Ortiz	Mexico (MEX); Edna Carrillo; Mónica Hernández; Karla Tapia; Andrea Gutiérrez; Andrea Poo; Miriam González; Vanessa Zambotti	Venezuela (VEN); Diana Ortíz; Anriquelis Barrios; Wisneybi Machado; Karen León; Jormary Palma; Naibet Chirinos; Emileidys López; Dominican Republic (DOM); María García; Luisa Jiménez; Juana Villanueva; Katherine Otaño; Leidi Germán; Eliveri Villanueva; Isandrina Sánchez

== Medal table ==
* Host nation (Mexico)

Rank	Nation	Gold	Silver	Bronze	Total
1	Cuba (CUB)	13	4	1	18
2	Venezuela (VEN)	2	2	10	14
3	Colombia (COL)	2	0	3	5
4	Mexico (MEX)*	1	5	8	14
5	Dominican Republic (DOM)	0	4	5	9
6	Puerto Rico (PUR)	0	3	4	7
7	Guatemala (GUA)	0	0	1	1
7	Haiti (HAI)	0	0	1	1
7	Honduras (HON)	0	0	1	1
7	Nicaragua (NCA)	0	0	1	1
7	Trinidad and Tobago (TRI)	0	0	1	1
Totals (11 entries)		18	18	36	72
