= Judo at the 2010 South American Games =

Judo competition

- Dates: March 19–22

There were 22 judo events at the 2010 South American Games: 9 men's individual events, 9 women's individual events, men's and women's team and men's nage-no-kata and katame-no-kata. The events were held over March 19–22.

== Medal summary ==
=== Medal table ===
Rank	Nation	Gold	Silver	Bronze	Total
1	Brazil (BRA)	6	6	7	19
2	Venezuela (VEN)	5	4	10	19
3	Colombia (COL)	4	4	8	16
4	Argentina (ARG)	4	2	8	14
5	Peru (PER)	2	1	2	5
6	Ecuador (ECU)	1	3	6	10
7	Chile (CHI)	0	1	1	2
8	Uruguay (URU)	0	1	0	1
Totals (8 entries)		22	22	42	86

=== Medalists ===
Event	Gold	Silver	Bronze
Men's events
Men's nage-no-kata	Glatenferd Escobar; Luis Gabriel Cuartas; Colombia	Rioiti Uchida; Luis Santos; Brazil	Medardo Duarte; Javier Rivero; Venezuela; Johnny Martin Ramirez; Luis Jaime Romero; Peru
Men's katame-no-kata	Rioiti Uchida; Luis Santos; Brazil	Glatenferd Escobar; Luis Gabriel Cuartas; Colombia	Medardo Duarte; Javier Rivero; Venezuela; Ariel Sorati; Juan Pablo Vital; Argentina
Men's 55 kg	Armando Maita; Venezuela	Cristhian Gabriel Vera; Ecuador	Andrés Alezander Muñoz; Colombia; Juan Pablo Vital; Argentina
Men's 60 kg	Juan Miguel Acuña; Peru	José Ernesto Cano; Ecuador	John Jairo Vargas; Colombia; Javier Guédez; Venezuela
Men's 66 kg	Ricardo Valderrama; Venezuela	Luis Ricardo Revite; Brazil	Flavio Ormaza; Ecuador; Alejandro Villarroel; Chile
Men's 73 kg	Alejandro Clara; Argentina	Pablo Azzi Almeida; Uruguay	Antonio Rivas; Venezuela; Bruno Mendonça; Brazil
Men's 81 kg	Germán Velazco Correa; Peru	Mervin Rodríguez; Venezuela	Emmanuel Lucenti; Argentina; Rodrigo Luna; Brazil
Men's 90 kg	Diego Rosati; Argentina	José Gregorio Camacho; Venezuela	Oscar Rey; Colombia; Eduardo Santos; Brazil
Men's 100 kg	Leonardo Leite; Brazil	Camilo Avila; Colombia	Antony Pena; Venezuela; Cristian Schmidt; Argentina
Men's +100 kg	Rafael Silva; Brazil	Italo Alata; Chile	Orlando Baccino; Argentina; Luis Carvajal; Colombia
Men's Open	Rafael Silva; Brazil	Germán Correa; Peru	Antony Pena; Venezuela; Orlando Baccino; Argentina
Men's Team	Antony Peña; José Gregorio Camacho; Mervin Rodríguez; Javier Guédez; Ricardo Valderrama; Armando Maita; Fabián González; Antonio Rivas; Venezuela	Rafael Silva; Ricardo Ayres; Eduardo Santos; Leonardo Leite; Rodrigo Luna; Bruno Mendonça; Luis Ricardo Revite; Brazil	Emmanuel Lucenti; Jorge David Peralta; Orlando Baccino; Diego Rosati; Miguel Angel Albarracin; Alejandro Clara; Juan Pablo Vital; Cristian Schmidt; Argentina; Derian Giraldo; Camilo Edilfonso Avila; Luis Ignacio Carvajal; Oscar Eduardo Rey; Andrés Betancourt; Samuel Aristizábal; John Jairo Vargas; Mario Antonio Velasquez; Colombia
Women's events
Women's 44 kg	Yelitza Morillo; Venezuela	Steffany Garatejo; Colombia	Catiere Toledo; Brazil; Ibeth Heredia; Ecuador
Women's 48 kg	Paula Pareto; Argentina	Daniela Polzin; Brazil	Liliana Coloma; Peru; Luz Álvarez; Colombia
Women's 52 kg	Andressa Fernandes; Brazil	Wisneybi Machado; Venezuela	Yulieth Sánchez; Colombia; Oritia González; Argentina
Women's 57 kg	Ketleyn Quadros; Brazil	Melissa Rodríguez; Argentina	Diana Villavicencio; Ecuador; Yadinis Amarís; Colombia
Women's 63 kg	Diana Velasco; Colombia	Mariana López; Argentina	Ysis Barreto; Venezuela; Laisa Santana; Brazil
Women's 70 kg	Yuri Alvear; Colombia	Vanessa Minda; Ecuador	María Elena Rojas; Venezuela; Glaucia Lima; Brazil
Women's 78 kg	Lorena Briceño; Argentina	Anny Cortez; Colombia	Diana Zamora; Ecuador; Keivi Pinto; Venezuela
Women's +78 kg	Carmen Chalá; Ecuador	Giovanna Blanco; Venezuela	Priscila Silva; Brazil
Women's Open	Giovanna Blanco; Venezuela	Steffani Lupetti; Brazil	Carmen Chalá; Ecuador
Women's Team	Steffany Garatejo; Yuri Alvear; Yadinis Amarís; Yulieth Sánchez; Luz Álvarez; Diana Velasco; Anny Cortez; Colombia	Steffani Lupetti; Daniela Polzin; Priscila Silva; Catiere Toledo; Ketleyn Quadros; Laisa Santana; Andressa Fernandes; Glaucia Lima; Brazil	Diana Villavicencio; Ibeth Heredia; Joselin Guiracocha; Vanessa Minda; Diana Belen Morales; Diana Zamora; Carmen Chalá; Ecuador; Keivi Pinto; Luciana Castillo; Yelitza Morillo; Anriquelis Barrios; María Elena Rojas; Ysis Barreto; Wisneybi Machado; Giovanna Blanco; Venezuela
