= Judo at the 2011 Pan American Games – Men's 100 kg =

Men's 100 kg at the 2011 Pan American Games
- Venue: CODE II Gymnasium
- Dates: October 26
- Competitors: 10 from 10 nations

Medalists
| Gold medal | Luciano Corrêa | Brazil |
| Silver medal | Oreidis Despaigne | Cuba |
| Bronze medal | Cristian Schmidt | Argentina |
| Bronze medal | Sergio García | Mexico |

The men's 100 kg competition of the judo events at the 2011 Pan American Games in Guadalajara, Mexico, was held on October 26 at the CODE II Gymanasium. The defending champion was Oreidis Despaigne of Cuba.

== Schedule ==
All times are Central Standard Time (UTC−6).

| Date | Time | Round |
|---|---|---|
| October 26, 2011 | 11:00 | Preliminaries |
| October 26, 2011 | 11:32 | Quarterfinals |
| October 26, 2011 | 12:12 | Repechage |
| October 26, 2011 | 12:44 | Semifinals |
| October 26, 2011 | 17:24 | Bronze medal matches |
| October 26, 2011 | 17:40 | Final |

== Results ==
Legend

- 1st number = Ippon
- 2nd number = Waza-ari
- 3rd number = Yuko

=== Bracket ===
Preliminaries
Luciano Corrêa (BRA) | 100
Carlos Santiago (PUR) | 000
Oreidis Despaigne (CUB) | 120
Camilo Castaño (COL) | 000

Quarter Finals
Luciano Corrêa (BRA) | 110
Kyle Vashkulat (USA) | 010
Sergio García (MEX) | 001
Albeny Rosales (VEN) | 000
Oreidis Despaigne (CUB) | 010
Stefan Zwiers (CAN) | 000
Cristian Schmidt (ARG) | 110
Diego Ochoa (ESA) | 001

Semi Finals
Luciano Corrêa (BRA) | 110
Sergio García (MEX) | 001
Oreidis Despaigne (CUB) | 010
Cristian Schmidt (ARG) | 001

Final
Luciano Corrêa (BRA) | 010
Oreidis Despaigne (CUB) | 001

=== Repechage round ===
Two bronze medals were awarded.

First round
Carlos Santiago (PUR) | 100
Kyle Vashkulat (USA) | 000
Bye
Albeny Rosales (VEN)
Camilo Castaño (COL) | 011
Stefan Zwiers (CAN) | 001
Bye
Diego Ochoa (ESA)

Semifinals
Carlos Santiago (PUR) | 010
Albeny Rosales (VEN) | 000
Camilo Castaño (COL) | 000
Diego Ochoa (ESA) | 100

Finals
Cristian Schmidt (ARG) | 100
Carlos Santiago (PUR) | 001
Sergio García (MEX) | 100
Diego Ochoa (ESA) | 000
