= Judo at the 2010 South American Games – Men's team =

Judo competition

The Men's Team event at the 2010 South American Games was held on March 22.

== Medalists ==
Gold	Silver	Bronze	
Antony Peña; Jose Gregorio Camacho; Mervin Rodriguez; Javier Guédez; Ricardo Valderrama; Armando Maita; Fabián González; Antonio Rivas; Venezuela	Rafael Silva; Ricardo Ayres; Eduardo Santos; Leonardo Leite; Rodrigo Luna; Bruno Mendonça; Luis Ricardo Revite; Brazil	Emmanuel Lucenti; Jorge David Peralta; Orlando Baccino; Diego Rosati; Miguel Angel Albarracin; Alejandro Clara; Juan Pablo Vital; Cristian Schmidt; Argentina	Derian Giraldo; Camilo Edilfonso Avila; Luis Ignacio Carvajal; Oscar Eduardo Rey; Andres Betancourt; Samuel Aristizabal; John Jairo Vargas; Mario Antonio Velasquez; Colombia

== Results ==
=== Main Bracket ===
Quarterfinals
Venezuela	5 (50)
Chile	2 (17)
Panama	3 (30)
Paraguay	3 (30)
Brazil	4 (40)
Ecuador	2 (20)
Colombia	3 (27)
Argentina	4 (40)

Semifinals
Venezuela	7 (70)
Panama	0
Brazil	5 (50)
Argentina	2 (20)

Final
Venezuela	4 (35)
Brazil	3 (30)

=== Repechage ===
Round 1
Chile	6 (60)
Paraguay	1 (10)
Ecuador	2 (15)
Colombia	5 (50)

Round 2
Chile	1 (10)
Argentina	4 (40)
Colombia	7 (70)
Panama	0
