= Judo at the 2011 Pan American Games – Women's 78 kg =

Women's 78 kg at the 2011 Pan American Games
- Venue: CODE II Gymnasium
- Dates: October 27
- Competitors: 10 from 10 nations

Medalists
Gold medal	Kayla Harrison	United States
Silver medal	Catherine Roberge	Canada
Bronze medal	Yalennis Castillo	Cuba
Bronze medal	Mayra Aguiar	Brazil

The women's 78 kg competition of the judo events at the 2011 Pan American Games in Guadalajara, Mexico, was held on October 27 at the CODE II Gymanasium. The defending champion was Edinanci Silva of Brazil.

== Schedule ==
All times are Central Standard Time (UTC-6).

Date	Time	Round
October 27, 2011	11:00	Preliminaries
October 27, 2011	11:32	Quarterfinals
October 27, 2011	13:40	Semifinals
October 27, 2011	14:12	Repechage
October 27, 2011	17:24	Bronze medal matches
October 27, 2011	18:40	Final

== Results ==
Legend

- 1st number = Ippon
- 2nd number = Waza-ari
- 3rd number = Yuko

=== Bracket ===
Preliminaries
Keivi Pinto (VEN)	001
Mirla Nolberto (GUA)	122
Mayra Aguiar (BRA)	100
Diana Chala (ECU)	000

Quarter Finals
Anny Cortez (COL)	000
Catherine Roberge (CAN)	100
Lorena Briceño (ARG)	002
Mirla Nolberto (GUA)	001
Yalennis Castillo (CUB)	100
Lenia Ruvalcaba (MEX)	000
Mayra Aguiar (BRA)	000
Kayla Harrison (USA)	001

Semi Finals
Catherine Roberge (CAN)	100
Lorena Briceño (ARG)	000
Yalennis Castillo (CUB)	001
Kayla Harrison (USA)	002

Final
Catherine Roberge (CAN)	001
Kayla Harrison (USA)	011

=== Repechage round ===
Two bronze medals were awarded.

Semifinals
Anny Cortez (COL)	120
Mirla Nolberto (GUA)	000
Lenia Ruvalcaba (MEX)	000
Mayra Aguiar (BRA)	100

Finals
Anny Cortez (COL)	000
Yalennis Castillo (CUB)	100
Lorena Briceño (ARG)	000
Mayra Aguiar (BRA)	100
