= Judo at the 2011 Pan American Games – Women's 63 kg =

Women's 63 kg at the 2011 Pan American Games
- Venue: CODE II Gymnasium
- Dates: October 28
- Competitors: 10 from 10 nations

Medalists
Gold medal	Yaritza Abel	Cuba
Silver medal	Karina Acosta	Mexico
Bronze medal	Christal Ransom	United States
Bronze medal	Stéfanie Tremblay	Canada

The women's 63 kg competition of the judo events at the 2011 Pan American Games in Guadalajara, Mexico, was held on October 28 at the CODE II Gymanasium. The defending champion was Driulys González of Cuba.

== Schedule ==
All times are Central Standard Time (UTC-6).

Date	Time	Round
October 28, 2011	11:00	Preliminaries
October 28, 2011	11:32	Quarterfinals
October 28, 2011	13:00	Repechage
October 28, 2011	13:40	Semifinals
October 28, 2011	18:12	Bronze medal matches
October 28, 2011	18:28	Final

== Results ==
Legend

- 1st number = Ippon
- 2nd number = Waza-ari
- 3rd number = Yuko

=== Bracket ===
Preliminaries
Mariana Lopez (ARG)	001
Jessica Garcia (PUR)	002
Diana Velasco (COL)	102
Yennifer Dominguez (GUA)	000

Quarter Finals
Katherine Campos (BRA)	002
Jessica Garcia (PUR)	000
Christal Ransom (USA)	000
Karina Acosta (MEX)	001
Yaritza Abel (CUB)	100
Stéfanie Tremblay (CAN)	000
Diana Velasco (COL)	003
Ysis Barreto (VEN)	000

Semi Finals
Katherine Campos (BRA)	001
Karina Acosta (MEX)	010
Yaritza Abel (CUB)	100
Diana Velasco (COL)	000

Final
Karina Acosta (MEX)	001
Yaritza Abel (CUB)	100

=== Repechage round ===
Two bronze medals were awarded.

First round
Bye
Jessica Garcia (PUR)
Bye
Christal Ransom (USA)
Stéfanie Tremblay (CAN)
Bye
Yennifer Dominguez (GUA)	010
Ysis Barreto (VEN)	002

Semifinals
Jessica Garcia (PUR)	001
Christal Ransom (USA)	100
Stéfanie Tremblay (CAN)	100
Yennifer Dominguez (GUA)	000

Finals
Diana Velasco (COL)	001
Christal Ransom (USA)	001 HT
Katherine Campos (BRA)	000
Stéfanie Tremblay (CAN)	101
