= Judo at the 2011 Pan American Games – Women's 52 kg =

Women's 52 kg at the 2011 Pan American Games
- Venue: CODE II Gymnasium
- Dates: October 29
- Competitors: 10 from 10 nations

Medalists
Gold medal	Yanet Bermoy	Cuba
Silver medal	Érika Miranda	Brazil
Bronze medal	Angelica Delgado	United States
Bronze medal	Yulieth Sánchez	Colombia

The women's 52 kg competition of the judo events at the 2011 Pan American Games in Guadalajara, Mexico, was held on October 29 at the CODE II Gymanasium. The defending champion was Sheila Espinosa of Cuba.

== Schedule ==
All times are Central Standard Time (UTC−6).

Date	Time	Round
October 29, 2011	11:00	Preliminaries
October 29, 2011	11:16	Quarterfinals
October 29, 2011	12:36	Repechage
October 29, 2011	13:00	Semifinals
October 29, 2011	17:00	Bronze medal matches
October 29, 2011	17:16	Final

== Results ==
Legend

- 1st number = Ippon
- 2nd number = Waza-ari
- 3rd number = Yuko
- FG = Fusen-Gachi (Forfeit)

=== Bracket ===
Preliminaries
Anrriquelys Barrios (VEN)	001
Andrea Cardenas (MEX)	000
Angelica Delgado (USA)	100
Linouse Desravine (HAI)	000

Quarter Finals
Érika Miranda (BRA)	120
Laurie Wiltshire (CAN)	010
Oritia González (ARG)	011
Anrriquelys Barrios (VEN)	000
Angelica Delgado (USA)	010
Yulieth Sánchez (COL)	000
Yanet Bermoy (CUB)	101
Lesly Huaman (PER)	000

Semi Finals
Érika Miranda (BRA)	100
Oritia González (ARG)	000
Angelica Delgado (USA)	000
Yanet Bermoy (CUB)	100

Final
Érika Miranda (BRA)	000
Yanet Bermoy (CUB)	101

=== Repechage round ===
Two bronze medals were awarded.

First round
Bye
Laurie Wiltshire (CAN)
Bye
Anrriquelys Barrios (VEN)
Linouse Desravine (HAI)	000
Yulieth Sánchez (COL)	100
Bye
Lesly Huaman (PER)

Semifinals
Laurie Wiltshire (CAN)	110
Anrriquelys Barrios (VEN)	000
Yulieth Sánchez (COL)	FG
Lesly Huaman (PER)

Finals
Angelica Delgado (USA)	001
Laurie Wiltshire (CAN)	000
Oritia González (ARG)	010
Yulieth Sánchez (COL)	100
