= Judo at the 2010 South American Games – Men's open =

Judo competition

The Men's Open event at the 2010 South American Games was held on March 21.

== Medalists ==
Gold	Silver	Bronze
Rafael Silva; Brazil	German Correa; Peru	Antony Pena; Venezuela; Orlando Baccino; Argentina

== Results ==
=== Main Bracket ===
Quarterfinals		Semifinals		Final
Orlando Baccino (ARG)	000^{2}
Antony Pena (VEN)	101^{1}	Antony Pena (VEN)	000^{2}
German Correa (PER)	110^{2}	German Correa (PER)	002^{1}
Rene de Urriola (PAN)	001^{3}			German Correa (PER)	000^{1}
Rafael Silva (BRA)	101^{1}			Rafael Silva (BRA)	100
Luis Carvajal (COL)	000^{2}	Rafael Silva (BRA)	110^{2}
		Italo Cordova Alata (CHI)	001^{3}

=== Repechage ===
Round 1
Orlando Baccino (ARG)	101^{1}
Rene de Urriola (PAN)	000^{2}
Luis Carvajal (COL)
bye

Round 2
Orlando Baccino (ARG)	121^{2}
Italo Cordova Alata (CHI)	001^{1}
Luis Carvajal (COL)	000^{1}
Antony Pena (VEN)	100^{1}
