= Jeanette Rodríguez =

Jeanette Rodríguez may refer to:

- Jeanette Rodriguez (judoka)
- Jeanette Rodríguez (actress)
