= Judo at the 2015 Pan American Games – Women's 63 kg =

Women's 63 kg at the 2015 Pan American Games
- Venue: Mississauga Sports Centre
- Dates: July 13
- Competitors: 10 from 10 nations

Medalists
Gold medal	Estefania García	Ecuador
Silver medal	Stéfanie Tremblay	Canada
Bronze medal	Maylín del Toro	Cuba
Bronze medal	Mariana Silva	Brazil

The women's 63 kg competition of the judo events at the 2015 Pan American Games in Toronto, Canada, was held on July 13 at the Mississauga Sports Centre.

== Schedule ==
All times are Central Standard Time (UTC-6).

Date	Time	Round
July 13, 2015	15:00	Preliminary bout
July 13, 2015	15:14	Quarterfinals
July 13, 2015	15:35	Repechage
July 13, 2015	17:06	Semifinals
July 13, 2015	20:00	Bronze medal matches
July 13, 2015	20:14	Final

== Results ==
Legend

- 1st number = Ippon
- 2nd number = Waza-ari
- 3rd number = Yuko

=== Bracket ===
Preliminaries
Stéfanie Tremblay (CAN)	100
Gimena Laffeuillade (ARG)	000
Diana Velasco (COL)	000S1
Yennifer Dominguez (GUA)	000S2

Quarter Finals
Mariana Silva (BRA)	101
Andrea Gutiérrez (MEX)	000
Maylín del Toro (CUB)	000S2
Stéfanie Tremblay (CAN)	100
Estefania García (ECU)	100
Diana Velasco (COL)	000
Hannah Martin (USA)	100S1
Maria Arteaga (VEN)	000

Semi Finals
Mariana Silva (BRA)	000
Stéfanie Tremblay (CAN)	100
Estefania García (ECU)	000
Hannah Martin (USA)	000S2

Final
Stéfanie Tremblay (CAN)	000S1
Estefania García (ECU)	000

=== Repechage round ===
Two bronze medals were awarded.

Repechage		Bronze medal
Andrea Gutiérrez (MEX)	000S1
Maylín del Toro (CUB)	001S2	Maylín del Toro (CUB)	000
		Hannah Martin (USA)	000S2

Repechage		Bronze medal
Diana Velasco (COL)	100
Maria Arteaga (VEN)	000	Diana Velasco (COL)	000S1
		Mariana Silva (BRA)	011S1
