= Carmen Chalá =

Ecuadorian judoka (born 1976)

Personal information
- Full name: Carmen Anita Chalá Quilumba
- Born: June 7, 1976 (age 50) Carchi, Ecuador
Medal record
Women's judo
Representing Ecuador
Pan American Games
Silver medal – second place	2007 Rio de Janeiro	+ 78 kg
Bronze medal – third place	1999 Winnipeg	+ 78 kg
Bronze medal – third place	2003 Santo Domingo	+ 78 kg
Pan American Judo Championships
Gold medal – first place	2005 Caguas	+78 kg
Gold medal – first place	2005 Caguas	Openweight
Bronze medal – third place	2006 Buenos Aires	+78 kg
Bronze medal – third place	2007 Montreal	+78 kg
Bronze medal – third place	2008 Miami	Openweight
Bronze medal – third place	2009 Buenos Aires	+78 kg
Bronze medal – third place	2009 Buenos Aires	Openweight
South American Games
Gold medal – first place	2002 Rio de Janeiro	+ 78 kg
Silver medal – second place	2002 Rio de Janeiro	Openweight
Silver medal – second place	2006 Buenos Aires	Openweight
Bronze medal – third place	2006 Buenos Aires	+ 78 kg
Bronze medal – third place	2010 Medellín	+ 78 kg
Bronze medal – third place	2010 Medellín	Openweight
Women's athletics
South American Games
Gold medal – first place	1990 Lima	Shot put
Bronze medal – third place	1990 Lima	Discus throw
Bronze medal – third place	1990 Lima	Heptathlon
Bolivarian Games
Silver medal – second place	1993 Cochabamba	Shot put
Silver medal – second place	1993 Cochabamba	Discus throw
Bronze medal – third place	1989 Maracaibo	Shot put

Carmen Anita Chalá Quilumba (born June 7, 1976) is a judoka and former field athlete from Ecuador.

== Early life, family and education ==
Carmen was born in the Ecuadoran province Carchi but at heart she is from Manabí. Her family has many athletes in it: older sister Eva, and younger sisters Diana and Vanessa have all been national judo team members.

== Athletic career ==
Carmen Chalá was a national champion in athletics in shot put and discus throw. However, by 1995, realizing that there are not many chances to be a successful field athlete at an international level, she began learning and practicing judo. She was 29 years old, considered very late to begin an endeavor like that. Her older sister Eva Chalá inspired her to try judo as she was already involved in it herself; Eva later became a referee for the sport as well.

After only a month of judo training, Carmen became a national heavyweight champion. In the final, she defeated Olympian María Cangá, whom Carmen considered the nation's top female judo athlete.

Although her success has been primarily within South American contests, Chalá participated at three Olympic Games but won only one match, defeating Sandra Köppen of Germany at the 2004 Olympic Games. In 2009, she wanted to join in politics but later delayed her candidature. She decided to continue as an athlete, aspiring to participate in the 2012 Olympic Games in London, but she did not.

== Achievements ==
Year	Tournament	Place	Weight class
2000	Olympic Games	AC	Heavyweight (+ 78 kg)
2004	Olympic Games	AC	Heavyweight (+ 78 kg)
2008	Olympic Games	18th	Heavyweight (+ 78 kg)

Year	Tournament	Place	Weight class
1999	Pan American Games	3rd	Heavyweight (+ 78 kg)
2003	Pan American Games	3rd	Heavyweight (+ 78 kg)
2007	Pan American Games	2nd	Heavyweight (+ 78 kg)

Year	Tournament	Place	Weight class
2005	Pan American Judo Championships	1st	Heavyweight (+ 78 kg)
2005	Pan American Judo Championships	1st	Openweight
2006	Pan American Judo Championships	3rd	Heavyweight (+ 78 kg)
2006	Pan American Judo Championships	8th	Openweight
2007	Pan American Judo Championships	3rd	Heavyweight (+ 78 kg)
2007	Pan American Judo Championships	7th	Openweight
2008	Pan American Judo Championships	5th	Heavyweight (+ 78 kg)
2008	Pan American Judo Championships	3rd	Openweight
2009	Pan American Judo Championships	3rd	Heavyweight (+ 78 kg)
2009	Pan American Judo Championships	3rd	Openweight
2010	Pan American Judo Championships	5th	Heavyweight (+ 78 kg)
2010	Pan American Judo Championships	10th	Openweight

Year	Tournament	Place	Weight class
2002	South American Games	1st	Heavyweight (+ 78 kg)
2002	South American Games	2nd	Openweight
2006	South American Games	3rd	Heavyweight (+ 78 kg)
2006	South American Games	2nd	Openweight
2010	South American Games	3rd	Heavyweight (+ 78 kg)
2010	South American Games	3rd	Openweight
