= Chiclana =

Chiclana may refer to:

- Chiclana de la Frontera, a town and municipality in the province of Cádiz, Andalusia, Spain
- Chiclana de Segura, a city in the province of Jaén, Spain
- Chiclana CF, a football club based in Chiclana de la Frontera
- Alexis Chiclana (born 1987), Puerto Rican judoka
- Feliciano Chiclana (1761–1826), Argentine lawyer, soldier, and judge
