= Judo at the 2010 South American Games – Men's 66kg =

Judo competition

The Men's 66 kg event at the 2010 South American Games was held on March 20, 2010.

== Medalists ==
Gold	Silver	Bronze
Ricardo Valderrama; Venezuela	Luis Ricardo Revite; Brazil	Flavio Ormaza; Ecuador; Alejandro Villarroel; Chile

== Results ==
=== Main Bracket ===
First round
Flavio Ormaza (ECU)	101
Carlos Lopez (PAN)	000^{2}

Quarterfinals
Flavio Ormaza (ECU)	002^{2}
Alejandro Villarroel (CHI)	001^{2}
Ricardo Valderrama (VEN)	101^{1}
Abraham de Jesus Mora (PAR)	000H
Daniel Huertas (PER)	000^{2}
Miguel Angel Albarracin (ARG)	101
Luis Ricardo Revite (BRA)	100
Samuel Aristizabal (COL)	100

Semifinals
Flavio Ormaza (ECU)	000
Ricardo Valderrama (VEN)	100
Miguel Angel Albarracin (ARG)	000H
Luis Ricardo Revite (BRA)	100

Final
Ricardo Valderrama (VEN)	002^{2}
Luis Ricardo Revite (BRA)	001^{2}

=== Repechage ===
First round
Carlos Lopez (PAN)	000
Alejandro Villarroel (CHI)	100
bye
Abraham de Jesus Mora (PAR)
Daniel Huertas (PER)
Bye
Samuel Aristizabal (COL)
Bye

Second round
Alejandro Villarroel (CHI)	100^{1}
Abraham de Jesus Mora (PAR)	000^{1}
Daniel Huertas (PER)	100
Samuel Aristizabal (COL)	000H

Bronze medal finals
Alejandro Villarroel (CHI)	100^{1}
Miguel Angel Albarracin (ARG)	011H
Daniel Huertas (PER)	000
Flavio Ormaza (ECU)	110^{1}
