= Judo at the 2011 Pan American Games – Men's 66 kg =

Men's 66 kg at the 2011 Pan American Games
- Venue: CODE II Gymnasium
- Dates: October 28
- Competitors: 10 from 10 nations

Medalists
Gold medal	Leandro Cunha	Brazil
Silver medal	Kenneth Hashimoto	United States
Bronze medal	Anyelo Gomez	Cuba
Bronze medal	Ricardo Valderrama	Venezuela

The men's 66 kg competition of the judo events at the 2011 Pan American Games in Guadalajara, Mexico, was held on October 28 at the CODE II Gymanasium. The defending champion was João Derly of Brazil.

== Schedule ==
All times are Central Standard Time (UTC-6).

Date	Time	Round
October 28, 2011	11:00	Preliminaries
October 28, 2011	11:32	Quarterfinals
October 28, 2011	12:44	Repechage
October 28, 2011	13:40	Semifinals
October 28, 2011	17:00	Bronze medal matches
October 28, 2011	17:16	Final

== Results ==
Legend

- 1st number = Ippon
- 2nd number = Waza-ari
- 3rd number = Yuko

=== Bracket ===
Preliminaries
Kenneth Hashimoto (USA)	100
Alejandro Zuňiga (CHI)	000
Sasha Mehmedovic (CAN)	002
Humberto Wong (PER)	001

Quarter Finals
Ricardo Valderrama (VEN)	010
Anyelo Gomez (CUB)	003
Kenneth Hashimoto (USA)	101
Flavio Verdugo (ECU)	000
Leandro Cunha (BRA)	101
Sasha Mehmedovic (CAN)	000
Carlos Figueroa (ESA)	000
Francisco Carreon (MEX)	001

Semi Finals
Ricardo Valderrama (VEN)	010
Kenneth Hashimoto (USA)	001
Leandro Cunha (BRA)	100
Francisco Carreon (MEX)	000

Final
Kenneth Hashimoto (USA)	000
Leandro Cunha (BRA)	121

=== Repechage round ===
Two bronze medals were awarded.

First round
Anyelo Gomez (CUB)
Bye
Alejandro Zuňiga (CHI)	001
Flavio Verdugo (ECU)	001
Bye
Sasha Mehmedovic (CAN)
Bye
Carlos Figueroa (ESA)

Semifinals
Anyelo Gomez (CUB)	002
Flavio Verdugo (ECU)	001
Sasha Mehmedovic (CAN)	101
Carlos Figueroa (ESA)	001

Finals
Francisco Carreon (MEX)	000
Anyelo Gomez (CUB)	001
Ricardo Valderrama (VEN)	100
Sasha Mehmedovic (CAN)	000
