= Judo at the 2010 South American Games – Women's 44kg =

Judo competition

The Women's 44 kg event at the 2010 South American Games was held on March 20.

== Medalists ==
Gold	Silver	Bronze
Yelitza Morillo; Venezuela	Steffany Garatejo; Colombia	Catiere Toledo; Brazil; Ibeth Heredia; Ecuador

== Results ==
=== Main Bracket ===
Quarterfinals
Lesly Velasquez (PER)	000^{1}
Yelitza Morillo (VEN)	100
Steffany Garatejo (COL)	002^{1}
Antonieta Galleguillos (CHI)	000^{2}

Semifinals
Yelitza Morillo (VEN)	110
Catiere Toledo (BRA)	001^{1}
Steffany Garatejo (COL)	110
Ibeth Heredia (ECU)	000^{1}

Final
Yelitza Morillo (VEN)	100
Steffany Garatejo (COL)	000

=== Repechage ===
Round 1
Lesly Velasquez (PER)
bye
Antonieta Galleguillos (CHI)
bye

Round 2
Lesly Velasquez (PER)	000
Ibeth Heredia (ECU)	GS
Antonieta Galleguillos (CHI)	000
Catiere Toledo (BRA)	100^{1}
