= Judo at the 2010 South American Games – Men's +100kg =

Judo competition

The Men's +100 kg event at the 2010 South American Games was held on March 19.

== Medalists ==
Gold	Silver	Bronze
Rafael Silva; Brazil	Italo Alata; Chile	Orlando Baccino; Argentina; Luis Carvajal; Colombia

== Results ==
=== Round Robin ===
Class	Athlete	Contest			Points		
Class	Athlete	Pld	W	L	W	L	Diff
1st place, gold medalist(s)	Rafael Silva (BRA)	3	3	0	30	0	+30
2nd place, silver medalist(s)	Italo Alata (CHI)	3	1	2	10	20	-20
3rd place, bronze medalist(s)	Luis Carvajal (COL)	3	1	2	10	20	-20
3rd place, bronze medalist(s)	Orlando Baccino (ARG)	3	1	2	10	20	-20

Points system:

10	Ippon/Hansoku Make
7	Waza-ari/Shido(3)
5	Yuko/Shido (2)
1	Yusei-gachi (decision)

=== Contests ===
1	Orlando Baccino (ARG)	(0) 000^{2}	—	101^{1} (10)	Rafael Silva (BRA)
2	Luis Carvajal (COL)	(10) 120^{1}	—	001 (0)	Italo Alata (CHI)
3	Orlando Baccino (ARG)	(10) 122^{2}	—	011^{2} (0)	Luis Carvajal (COL)
4	Rafael Silva (BRA)	('0) 102^{1}	—	000^{1} (0)	Italo Alata (CHI)
5	Orlando Baccino (ARG)	(0) 000^{1}	—	100^{1} (10)	Italo Alata (CHI)
6	Rafael Silva (BRA)	(10) 101^{1}	—	000^{2} (0)	Luis Carvajal (COL)
