= 2009 Pan American Judo Championships =

Judo competition

2009 Judo Pan American Judo Championships
- Venue: CeNARD
- Location: Buenos Aires, Argentina
- Dates: 25–30 Mar 2009

Competition at external databases
- Links: JudoInside

The 2009 Pan American Judo Championships was held in Centro Nacional de Alto Rendimiento Deportivo in Buenos Aires, Argentina from 26 to 27 March 2009.

== Medal overview ==
=== Men's events ===
Event	Gold	Silver	Bronze
–55 kg	Damián Villalba (ARG)	Dodanim Barboza (COL)	Shujon Mazumder (CAN)
–55 kg	Damián Villalba (ARG)	Dodanim Barboza (COL)	Connor Murtha (USA)
–60 kg	Javier Guédez (VEN)	Frazer Will (CAN)	Yosmani Piker (CUB)
–60 kg	Javier Guédez (VEN)	Frazer Will (CAN)	Aaron Kunihiro (USA)
–66 kg	João Derly (BRA)	Miguel Albarracín (ARG)	Michal Popiel (CAN)
–66 kg	João Derly (BRA)	Miguel Albarracín (ARG)	Luis Galindo (COL)
–73 kg	Leandro Guilheiro (BRA)	Nicholas Tritton (CAN)	Yordanis Arencibia (CUB)
–73 kg	Leandro Guilheiro (BRA)	Nicholas Tritton (CAN)	Michael Eldred (USA)
–81 kg	Travis Stevens (USA)	Flávio Canto (BRA)	Emmanuel Lucenti (ARG)
–81 kg	Travis Stevens (USA)	Flávio Canto (BRA)	Luis Retamales (CHI)
–90 kg	Alexandre Émond (CAN)	Eduardo Santos (BRA)	Gonzalo Huamán (CHI)
–90 kg	Alexandre Émond (CAN)	Eduardo Santos (BRA)	Garry St. Leger (USA)
–100 kg	Oreidis Despaigne (CUB)	Cristian Schmidt (ARG)	Luciano Corrêa (BRA)
–100 kg	Oreidis Despaigne (CUB)	Cristian Schmidt (ARG)	Scott Edward (CAN)
+100 kg	Óscar Brayson (CUB)	João Schlittler (BRA)	Orlando Baccino (ARG)
+100 kg	Óscar Brayson (CUB)	João Schlittler (BRA)	Carlos Zegarra (PER)
Openweight	Luciano Corrêa (BRA)	Óscar Brayson (CUB)	Héctor Campos (ARG)
Openweight	Luciano Corrêa (BRA)	Óscar Brayson (CUB)	Luis Salazar (COL)

=== Women's events ===
Event	Gold	Silver	Bronze
–44 kg	Steffany Garatejo (COL)	Jacqueline Solís (GUA)	Antonieta Galleguillos (CHI)
–44 kg	Steffany Garatejo (COL)	Jacqueline Solís (GUA)	Taylor Ibera (USA)
–48 kg	Paula Pareto (ARG)	Luz Álvarez (COL)	Sarah Menezes (BRA)
–48 kg	Paula Pareto (ARG)	Luz Álvarez (COL)	Edna Carrillo (MEX)
–52 kg	Yanet Bermoy (CUB)	Yulieth Sánchez (COL)	Oritia González (ARG)
–52 kg	Yanet Bermoy (CUB)	Yulieth Sánchez (COL)	Glenda Miranda (ECU)
–57 kg	Yurisleidy Lupetey (CUB)	Danielle Zangrando (BRA)	Joliane Melançon (CAN)
–57 kg	Yurisleidy Lupetey (CUB)	Danielle Zangrando (BRA)	Diana Villavicencio (ECU)
–63 kg	Daniela Krukower (ARG)	Danielli Yuri (BRA)	Karina Acosta (MEX)
–63 kg	Daniela Krukower (ARG)	Danielli Yuri (BRA)	Ysis Barreto (VEN)
–70 kg	Yuri Alvear (COL)	Maria Portela (BRA)	Kelita Zupancic (CAN)
–70 kg	Yuri Alvear (COL)	Maria Portela (BRA)	Saraí Mendoza (ESA)
–78 kg	Kaliema Antomarchi (CUB)	Anny Cortés (COL)	Amy Cotton (CAN)
–78 kg	Kaliema Antomarchi (CUB)	Anny Cortés (COL)	Déborah Souza (BRA)
+78 kg	Idalys Ortiz (CUB)	Claudirene César (BRA)	Carmen Chalá (ECU)
+78 kg	Idalys Ortiz (CUB)	Claudirene César (BRA)	Vanessa Zambotti (MEX)
Openweight	Idalys Ortiz (CUB)	Vanessa Zambotti (MEX)	Carmen Chalá (ECU)
Openweight	Idalys Ortiz (CUB)	Vanessa Zambotti (MEX)	Claudirene César (BRA)

== Medals table ==
Rank	Nation	Gold	Silver	Bronze	Total
1	Cuba	7	1	2	10
2	Brazil	3	7	4	14
3	Argentina	3	2	4	9
4	Colombia	2	4	2	8
5	Canada	1	2	6	9
6	United States	1	0	5	6
7	Venezuela	1	0	1	2
8	Mexico	0	1	3	4
9	Guatemala	0	1	0	1
10	Ecuador	0	0	4	4
11	Chile	0	0	3	3
12	El Salvador	0	0	1	1
12	Peru	0	0	1	1
Totals (13 entries)		18	18	36	72
