= Judo at the 2010 South American Games – Women's 78kg =

The Women's 78 kg event at the 2010 South American Games was held on March 19.

== Medalists ==
Gold	Silver	Bronze
Lorena Briceño; Argentina	Anny Cortez; Colombia	Diana Zamora; Ecuador; Keivi Pinto; Venezuela

== Results ==
=== Round Robin ===
Class	Athlete	Contest			Points		
Class	Athlete	Pld	W	L	W	L	Diff
1st place, gold medalist(s)	Lorena Briceño (ARG)	4	4	0	32	0	+32
2nd place, silver medalist(s)	Anny Cortez (COL)	4	3	1	17	10	+7
3rd place, bronze medalist(s)	Diana Zamora (ECU)	4	2	2	15	12	+3
3rd place, bronze medalist(s)	Keivi Pinto (VEN)	4	1	3	10	27	-17
5	Steffani Lupetti (BRA)	4	0	4	0	25	-25

Points system:

10	Ippon/Hansoku Make
7	Waza-ari/Shido(3)
5	Yuko/Shido (2)
1	Yusei-gachi (decision)

=== Contests ===
1	Steffani Lupetti (BRA)	(0) 000^{1}	—	001 (5)	Diana Zamora (ECU)
2	Lorena Briceño (ARG)	(10) 100^{1}	—	010^{1}	Anny Cortez (COL)
3	Steffani Lupetti (BRA)	(0) 000	—	100^{1} (10)	Keivi Pinto (VEN)
4	Diana Zamora (ECU)	(0) 010^{2}	—	011^{3} (7)	Lorena Briceño (ARG)
5	Anny Cortez (COL)	(7) 010	—	002^{3} (0)	Keivi Pinto (VEN)
6	Steffani Lupetti (BRA)	(0) 000^{2}	—	003^{1} (5)	Lorena Briceño (ARG)
7	Diana Zamora (ECU)	(10) 121^{2}	—	002^{2} (0)	Keivi Pinto (VEN)
8	Steffani Lupetti (BRA)	(0) 000^{1}	—	002^{1} (5)	Anny Cortez (COL)
9	Lorena Briceño (ARG)	(10) 100	—	000 (0)	Keivi Pinto (VEN)
10	Diana Zamora (ECU)	(0) 000^{1}	—	001 (5)	Anny Cortez (COL)
