= Rafael Silva (judoka) =

Brazilian judoka (born 1987)

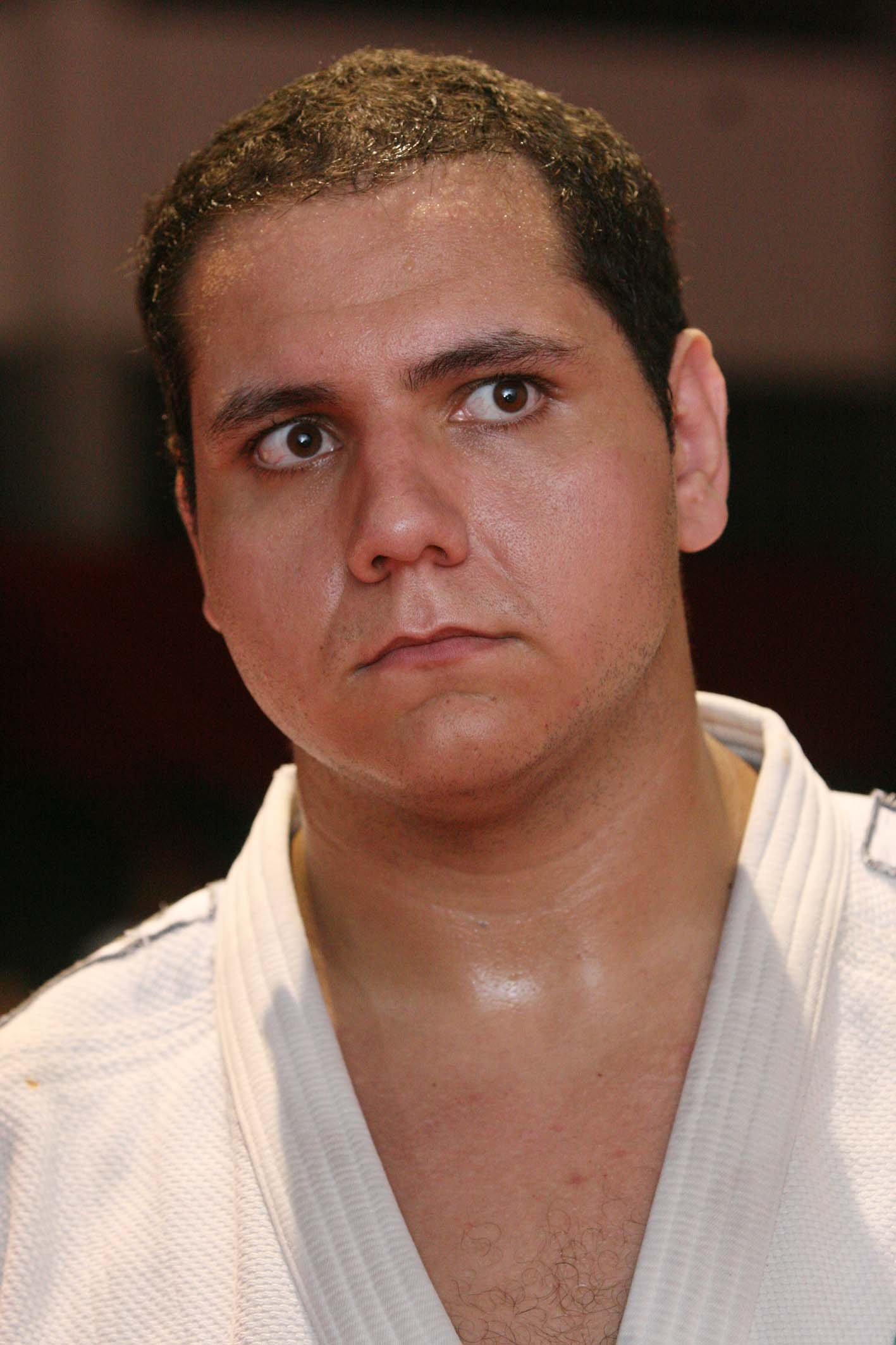
- Silva in 2011

Personal information
- Nickname: Baby
- Born: Rafael Carlos da Silva; 11 May 1987 (age 39) Campo Grande, Mato Grosso do Sul, Brazil
- Occupation: Judoka
- Height: 2.03 m (6 ft 8 in)
- Weight: 165 kg (364 lb)
- Website: rafaelsilvajudo.com.br

Sport
- Country: Brazil
- Sport: Judo
- Weight class: +100 kg
- Club: Esporte Clube Pinheiros
- Coached by: Renato Dagnino

Achievements and titles
- Olympic Games: (bronze) (2012, 2016)
- World Champ.: (silver) (2013)
- Pan American Champ.: (2012, 2013, 2014, 2016, 2019, 2021)
Medal record
Men's judo
Representing Brazil
Olympic Games
Bronze medal – third place	2012 London	+100 kg
Bronze medal – third place	2016 Rio de Janeiro	+100 kg
Bronze medal – third place	2024 Paris	Mixed team
World Championships
Silver medal – second place	2013 Rio de Janeiro	+100 kg
Silver medal – second place	2017 Budapest	Mixed team
Bronze medal – third place	2014 Chelyabinsk	+100 kg
Bronze medal – third place	2017 Budapest	+100 kg
Bronze medal – third place	2019 Tokyo	Mixed team
Bronze medal – third place	2021 Budapest	Mixed team
Bronze medal – third place	2023 Doha	+100 kg
Pan American Games
Silver medal – second place	2011 Guadalajara	+100 kg
Silver medal – second place	2023 Santiago	Mixed team
Bronze medal – third place	2023 Santiago	+100 kg
Pan American Championships
Gold medal – first place	2012 Montreal	+100 kg
Gold medal – first place	2013 San José	+100 kg
Gold medal – first place	2014 Guayaquil	+100 kg
Gold medal – first place	2016 Havana	+100 kg
Gold medal – first place	2019 Lima	+100 kg
Gold medal – first place	2019 Lima	Mixed team
Gold medal – first place	2021 Guadalajara	+100 kg
Gold medal – first place	2023 Calgary	Mixed team
Silver medal – second place	2011 Guadalajara	+100 kg
Silver medal – second place	2015 Edmonton	+100 kg
Silver medal – second place	2020 Guadalajara	+100 kg
Silver medal – second place	2022 Lima	+100 kg
Silver medal – second place	2023 Calgary	+100 kg
Silver medal – second place	2024 Rio de Janeiro	+100 kg
World Masters
Gold medal – first place	2012 Almaty	+100 kg
Silver medal – second place	2013 Tyumen	+100 kg
Silver medal – second place	2018 Guangzhou	+100 kg
Bronze medal – third place	2017 Saint Petersburg	+100 kg
IJF Grand Slam
Gold medal – first place	2014 Tyumen	+100 kg
Silver medal – second place	2012 Paris	+100 kg
Silver medal – second place	2012 Tokyo	+100 kg
Silver medal – second place	2013 Tokyo	+100 kg
Silver medal – second place	2021 Tbilisi	+100 kg
Silver medal – second place	2021 Kazan	+100 kg
Silver medal – second place	2022 Tel Aviv	+100 kg
Bronze medal – third place	2011 Tokyo	+100 kg
Bronze medal – third place	2013 Paris	+100 kg
Bronze medal – third place	2017 Paris	+100 kg
Bronze medal – third place	2018 Ekaterinburg	+100 kg
Bronze medal – third place	2019 Ekaterinburg	+100 kg
Bronze medal – third place	2020 Düsseldorf	+100 kg
Bronze medal – third place	2023 Tel Aviv	+100 kg
IJF Grand Prix
Silver medal – second place	2015 Samsun	+100 kg
Bronze medal – third place	2010 Qingdao	+100 kg
Bronze medal – third place	2011 Düsseldorf	+100 kg
Bronze medal – third place	2011 Qingdao	+100 kg
Bronze medal – third place	2014 Düsseldorf	+100 kg
Bronze medal – third place	2016 Tbilisi	+100 kg
Bronze medal – third place	2016 Samsun	+100 kg
Bronze medal – third place	2018 Hohhot	+100 kg
Bronze medal – third place	2023 Almada	+100 kg

Profile at external databases
- IJF: 2618
- JudoInside.com: 36264
- Updated on 29 April 2024

Rafael Carlos da Silva (Brazilian Portuguese: [ʁafaˈɛw ˈsiwvɐ]; born 11 May 1987) is a Brazilian heavyweight judoka. He has three Olympic bronze medals (London 2012, Rio 2016, and Paris 2024) in addition to having 4 individual medals in World Judo Championships (one silver and three bronze), in addition to being a six-time Pan American Judo champion.

== Early life ==
Born in Campo Grande, Mato Grosso do Sul, and raised in Rolândia, in the interior of Paraná, Silva only discovered judo at the age of 15, a very old age for top athletes. The difficulties brought about by the late start in the sport, such as the lack of technique and the basic fundamentals of judo, were overcome with a lot of training. With this, he managed to ascend quickly. In 2005 Rafael already represented Brazil internationally, even though he had only been in the sport for 3 years, and in 2006 Silva competed in the World Judo Juniors Championships in Santo Domingo. But it was in 2010 that Silva's results began to appear more prominently.

== International career ==
=== 2010–2012 ===
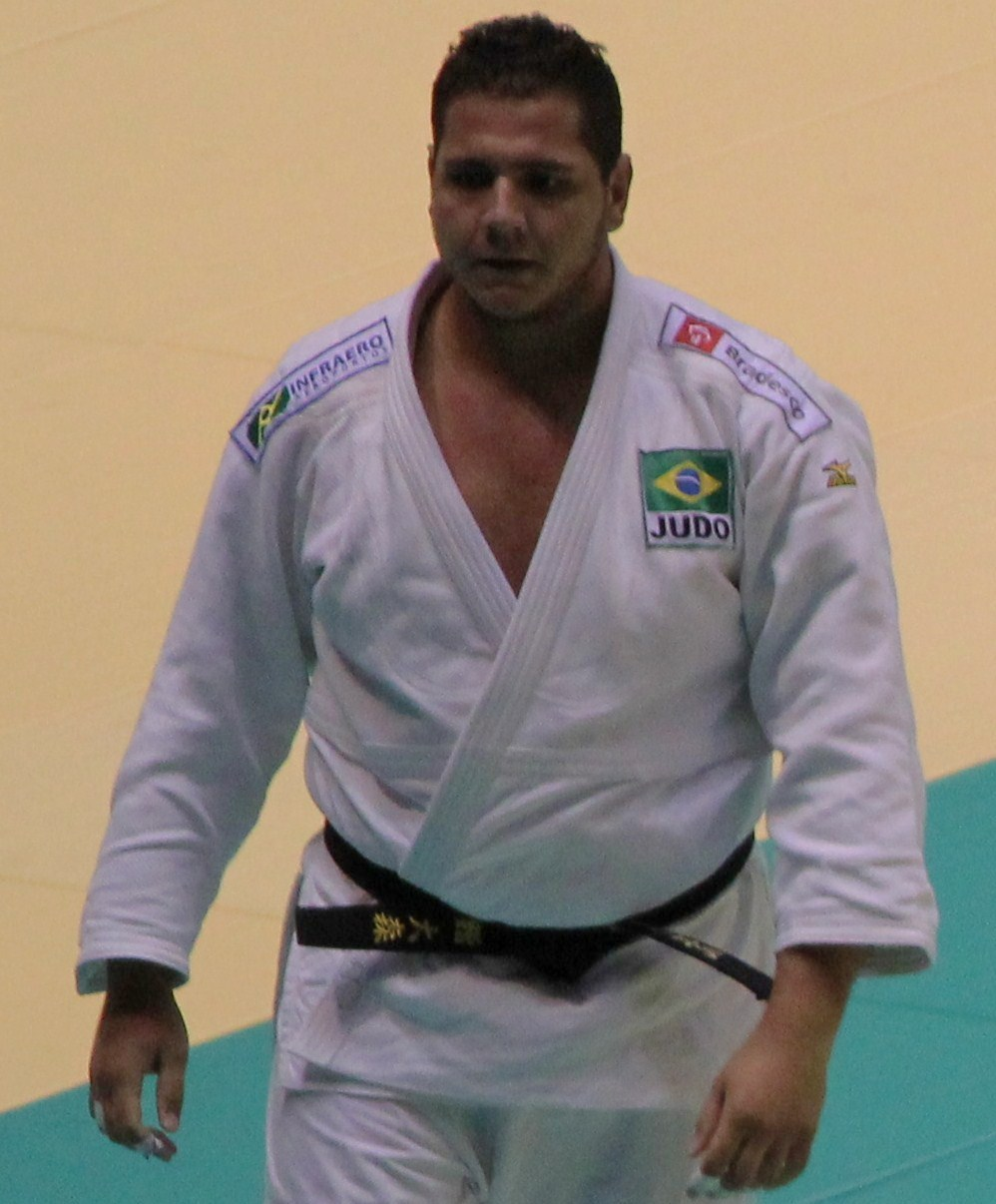
Silva at the 2010 World Judo Championships

At the 2010 South American Games he won three gold medals: in the Men's +100 kg, Men's Open and Men's Team category.

In 2010, Silva competed in his first adult world championship, at the 2010 World Judo Championships, when he finished in fifth place.

In 2011, Silva competed in the Pan American Games for the first time, in Guadalajara, placing second in the Men's +100 kg category after losing the final to Cuban Oscar Bryson.

At the end of 2011 he obtained his first medal in the Grand Slams (the tournament that gives the most points in the judo ranking after the Olympic Games, the World Championships and the World Masters) in Tokyo, where he obtained a bronze.

Participating in the 2012 Judo World Masters (the second most important competition on the circuit after the World Championship), Silva won gold, defeating the 2010 world champion, the Japanese Daiki Kamikawa, by ippon in the final.

At the 2012 Pan American Judo Championships held in Montreal, Canada, Silva, then third in the IJF (International Judo Federation) world rankings in the over 100 kg category, won what would become the first of many golds in this competition, defeating Cuban Oscar Brayson.

In 2012, he also won two silver medals at the Paris and Tokyo Grand Slams.

Throughout 2011 and 2012, the Brazilian established himself as one of the most promising judokas in the category, winning more than 11 medals on the World Circuit, including silver in the traditional Tokyo Grand Slam and the silver medal in the men's team world championship, in Salvador, Bahia.

=== 2012 Summer Olympics ===
In 2012, Silva definitively joined the gallery of greatest Brazilian judokas, when he won the bronze medal at the London Olympic Games, the only one in Brazil's men's judo at that edition and the first medal in the Brazil's history of the heavyweight division. Silva maintained his excellent form throughout the 2016 Olympic cycle and came to lead the world rankings, ahead of Frenchman Teddy Riner, one of the biggest names in the history of world judo.

=== 2013–2016 ===
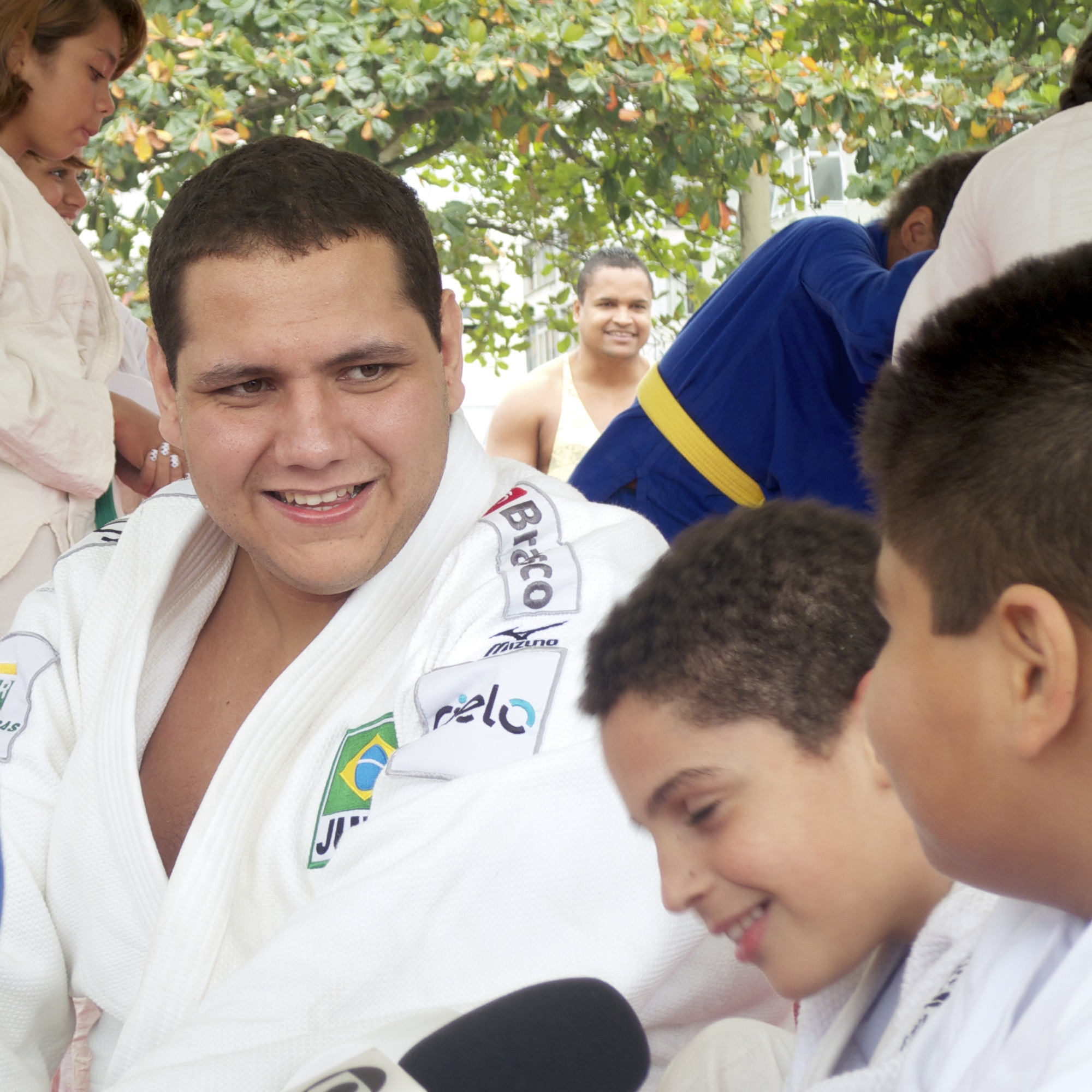
Rafael Silva, 2013

At the 2013 Pan American Judo Championships, held in San Jose, Costa Rica, Silva became two-time champion of the Heavyweight category (+100 kg).

At the 2013 Judo World Masters, Silva won the silver medal.

At the 2013 Judo World Championship, held in Rio de Janeiro, Brazil, Silva reached the final, but lost to the legendary judoka Teddy Riner, who became six-time world champion. With this, he won the silver medal.

At the end of 2013, she won silver at the 2013 Judo Grand Slam Tokyo.

At the 2014 Pan American Judo Championships, held in Guayaquil, Ecuador, Silva became three-time champion of the Heavyweight category (+100 kg).

Rafael Silva achieved his best performance in Grand Slams in Tyumen 2014, when he was champion, obtaining the gold medal.

At the 2014 World Judo Championships, held in Chelyabinsk, Russia, Rafael Silva reached the semifinals, once again having to face the invincible Teddy Riner (no one had managed to defeat him in the heavyweight category at a world championship). After losing the semifinal, he returned to the bronze medal, where he beat Dutchman Roy Meier and took bronze.

In April 2015, at the 2015 Pan American Judo Championships in Edmonton, he made a Brazilian final against David Moura, but was defeated, taking the silver medal.

In June 2015, he suffered an injury to his right pectoralis major muscle tendon during strength training and underwent a surgical procedure on June 30. As a result, he had to be removed from the 2015 Pan American Games, from the 2015 World Judo Championships and was unable to compete for the rest of the year.

In 2016, Silva fought to recover from his injury and get back ahead of his compatriot David Moura to qualify for the 2016 Olympic Games in Rio de Janeiro. At the 2016 Pan American Judo Championships in Havana, with a new final between Silva and Moura, Silva this time won and became four-time champion of the tournament.

=== 2016 Summer Olympics ===
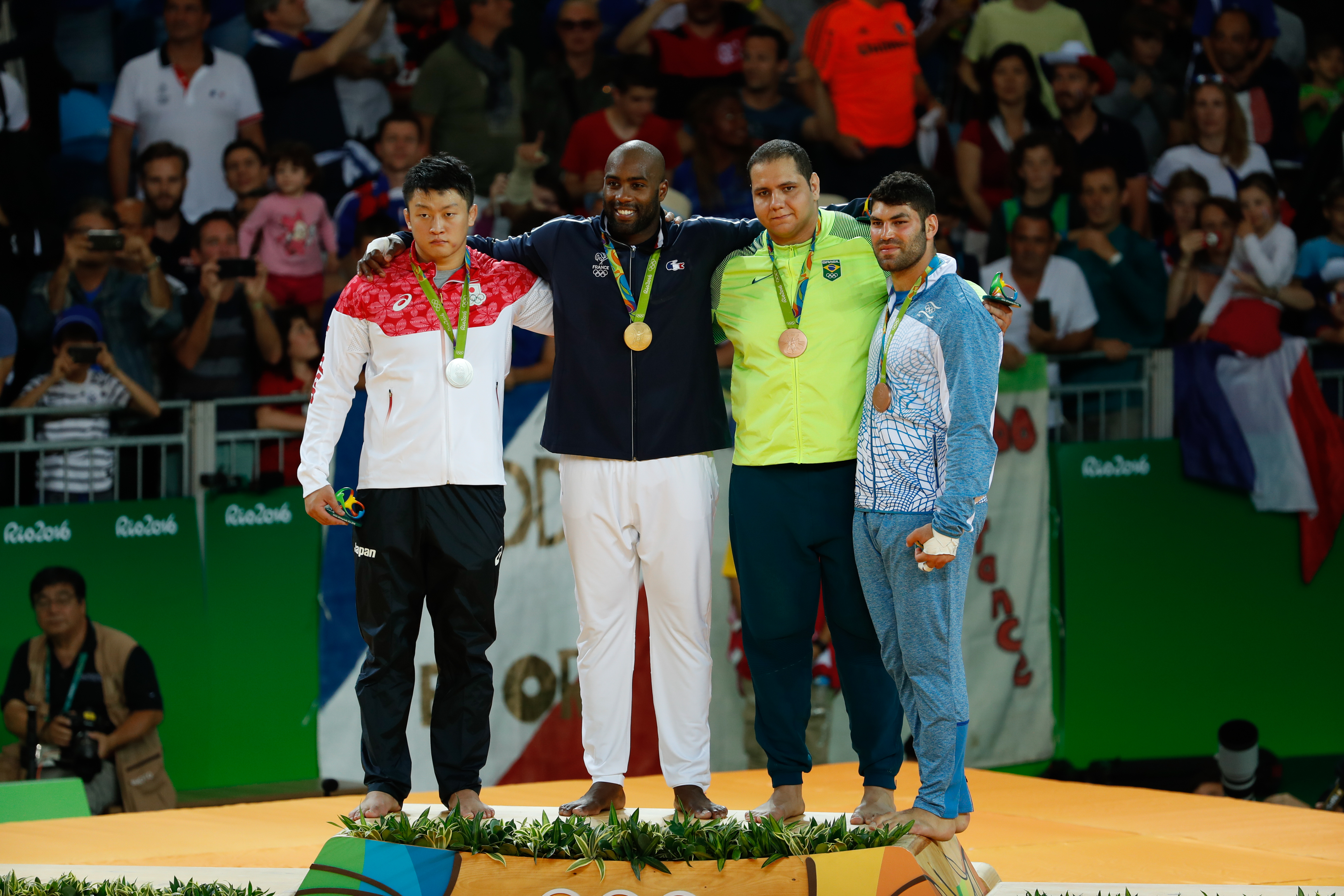
Medalists at the 2016 Summer Olympics

At the 2016 Summer Olympics, Silva won again the bronze medal in the Men's +100 kg, losing only to Teddy Riner.

=== 2017–2020 ===
At the 2017 Judo Grand Slam Paris, Silva won a bronze medal.

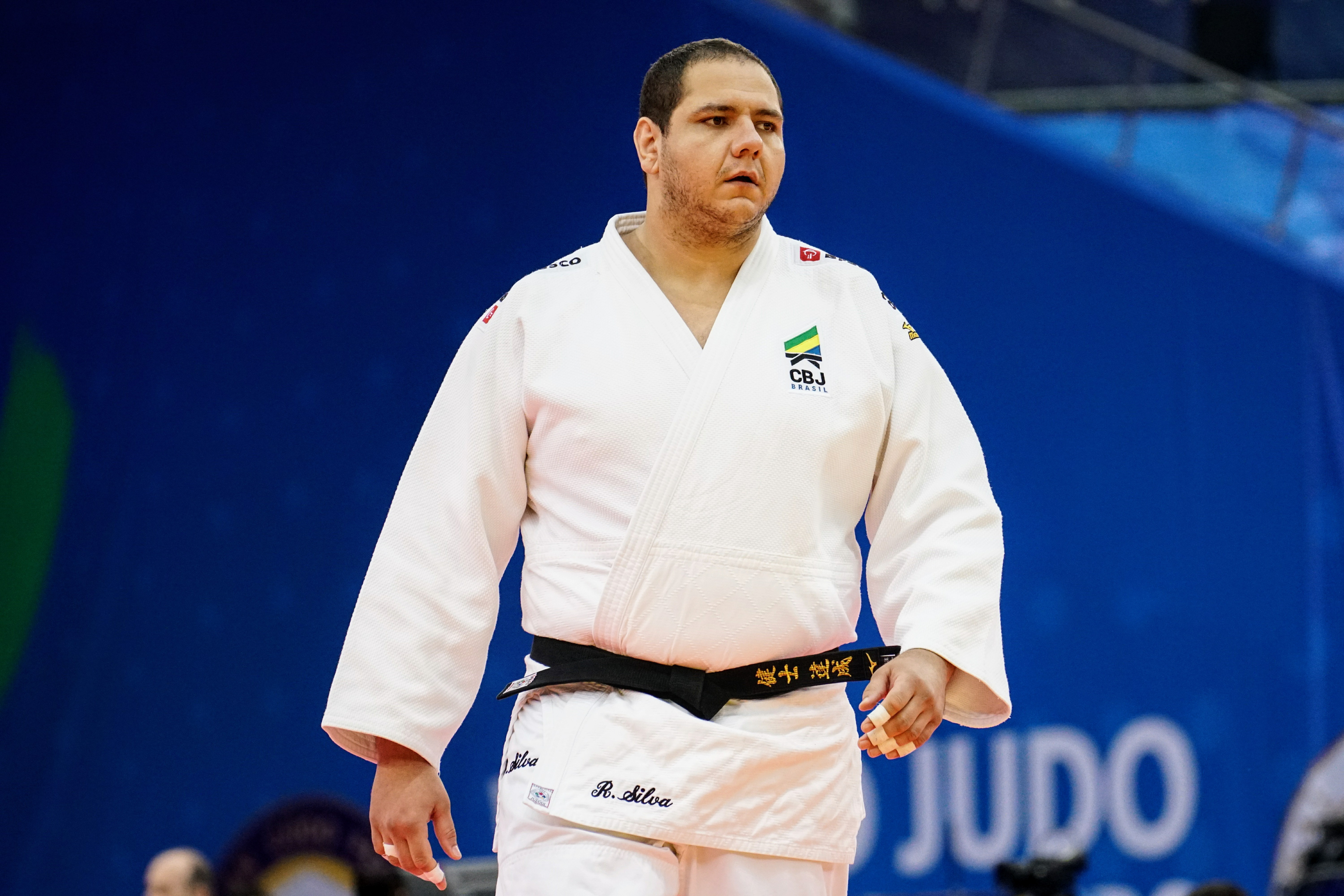
Silva at the 2018 World Judo Championships

At the 2017 World Judo Championships held in Budapest, Hungary, Silva beat Ushangi Kokauri, from Azerbaijan, in his debut, by ippon. Next, against the Romanian Daniel Natea, he won by waza-ari. The next rival was Tunisian Faicel Jaballah. Once again, Rafael Silva managed to win by ippon. In the quarterfinals, he faced Teddy Riner, who hadn't lost a fight in 7 years, and had no chance. The Frenchman applied two waza-aris and immobilized the Brazilian for 20 seconds, winning by ippon, pushing Slva into the repechage. To continue dreaming of a medal, Silva needed to get past Austrian Daniel Allerstorfer. The fight was tough and led to the golden score with one penalty against the Brazilian, and two against Allerstorfer. After almost six minutes of fighting, the Austrian was punished again and lost the fight. In the bronze dispute, the rival was Borna Bor. The Hungarian, supported by the fans, did well, but the Brazilian's experience counted more. The fight once again went to the golden score. After 6min18s, Bor received the second shido, and Silva celebrated bronze - his third individual medal at world championships (silver in Rio 2013, bronze in Chelyabinsk 2014 and Budapest 2017). In the mixed team modality, he won a silver medal representing Brazil.

At the 2017 Judo World Masters, Silva won the bronze medal.

At the 2018 Judo Grand Slam Ekaterinburg, Silva won a bronze medal.

At the 2018 World Judo Championships held in Baku, Azerbaijan, Silva lost in the first round to the Japanese Hisayoshi Harasawa, Olympic runner-up at the Rio 2016 Games. He wasn't well in the rankings because he fought little during this period, so he was unlucky enough to fall against one of the top fighters in the category.

At the 2018 Judo World Masters, Silva won the silver medal.

At the 2019 Judo Grand Slam Ekaterinburg, Silva won a bronze medal.

At the 2019 Pan American Judo Championships held in Lima, Peru, in another Brazilian final with Silva facing David Moura for the 3rd time in the finals of this tournament, Silva obtained his fifth gold in Pan American Judo Championships. In the mixed team modality, he won a gold medal representing Brazil.

At the 2019 World Judo Championships held in Tokyo, Japan, Silva reached the quarterfinals, losing to Japanese Hisayoshi Harasawa, the same way as in 2018. In the repechage, he reached the bronze medal match, but lost to Korean Kim Min-jong, finishing 5th. In the mixed team modality, he won a bronze medal representing Brazil.

At the 2020 Judo Grand Slam Düsseldorf, Silva won the bronze medal.

In 2020, he won the silver medal in the men's +100 kg event at the 2020 Pan American Judo Championships held in Guadalajara, Mexico.

At the 2021 Pan American Judo Championships held in Guadalajara, Mexico, in another Brazilian final with Silva (then 10th in the world) facing David Moura (then 11th in the world) for the 4th time in the finals of this tournament, Silva obtained his sixth gold in Pan American Judo Championships.

He was a silver medalist at the Tbilisi and Kazan Grand Slams, before going to the 2021 World Championships.

At the 2021 World Judo Championships held in Budapest, Hungary, Silva had the same performance as in 2019: he reached the semifinals, but was defeated twice in a row, by the Japanese Kokoro Kageura and in the bronze match by the Dutchman Roy Meyer, finishing 5th again. In the mixed team modality, he won a bronze medal representing Brazil.

=== 2020 Summer Olympics ===
He represented Brazil at the 2020 Summer Olympics. Silva reached the quarterfinals, but lost to Georgian Guram Tushishvil. In the first repechage fight, he had to face Teddy Rinner, who had also been beaten, finishing in 7th place.

=== 2021–2024 ===
He won the silver medal in his event at the 2022 Judo Grand Slam Tel Aviv held in Tel Aviv, Israel.

At the 2022 Pan American-Oceania Judo Championships held in Lima, Peru, Silva reached the final, but lost by controversial shidos (judo punishments) against Cuban Andy Granda, obtaining silver.

At the 2022 World Judo Championships held in Tashkent, Uzbekistan, he was eliminated in the round of 16 by Uzbek Alisher Yusupov. He had beaten China's Ruixuan Li in his first fight.

At the 2023 Judo Grand Slam Tel Aviv, he obtained the bronze medal.

In May 2023, at the 2023 World Judo Championships held in Doha, Qatar, Silva became the oldest judoka in history to reach the podium of the competition. At 36, he obtained the bronze medal. He had a great campaign, beating last year's champion, the Cuban Andy Granda in the repechage, and surprised in the bronze dispute, by beating ranking leader, Temur Rakhimov, from Tajikistan, by wazari on the golden score. Previously, he had defeated Ecuadorian Freddy Figueroa and German Losseni Kone, before falling to Uzbek Alisher Yusupov.

At the 2023 Pan American-Oceania Judo Championships held in Calgary, Canada, Silva made a new final with Cuban Andy Granda, where he fought evenly but ended up taking 3 punishments and obtaining silver. He also won a gold medal in the Brazil's mixed team.

Participating in the Pan American Games for the last time in his life, Silva was at the 2023 Pan American Games in Santiago, Chile. In this competition, he obtained bronze in the +100 kg category and silver in the mixed teams representing Brazil. He was defeated three times in the same competition by world champion Andy Granda, which prevented Silva from winning gold medals in this event.

At the 2024 Pan American-Oceania Judo Championships, he won a silver medal.
