= Estefania García =

Ecuadorian judoka (born 1988)

Personal information
- Born: May 13, 1988 (age 38) Portoviejo, Ecuador
- Occupation: Judoka

Sport
- Sport: Judo
Medal record
Women's judo
Representing Ecuador
Pan American Games
| Gold medal – first place | 2015 Toronto | –63 kg |
Pan American Championships
| Gold medal – first place | 2017 Panama | –63 kg |
| Silver medal – second place | 2012 Montreal | –63 kg |
| Silver medal – second place | 2014 Guayaquil | –63 kg |
| Bronze medal – third place | 2016 Havana | –63 kg |
| Bronze medal – third place | 2019 Lima | –63 kg |
| Bronze medal – third place | 2021 Guadalajara | –63 kg |

Profile at external databases
- IJF: 5310
- JudoInside.com: 43698
- Updated on 3 November 2021

Estefania Priscila García Mendoza (born 13 May 1988, Portoviejo) is an Ecuadorian judoka. At the 2012 Summer Olympics she competed in the Women's 63 kg, but was defeated in the second round.

She competed in the women's 63 kg division at the 2016 Summer Olympics in Rio de Janeiro. She defeated Mamadama Bangoura of Guinea in the first round and was then defeated by Kathrin Unterwurzacher of Austria in the next round. She was the flag bearer for Ecuador during the Parade of Nations.

She represented Ecuador at the 2020 Summer Olympics in Tokyo, Japan.

Olympic Games
| Preceded by César de Cesare | Flagbearer for Ecuador; Rio de Janeiro 2016 | Succeeded by Klaus Jungbluth |
