= Luz Álvarez =

Colombian judoka (born 1987)

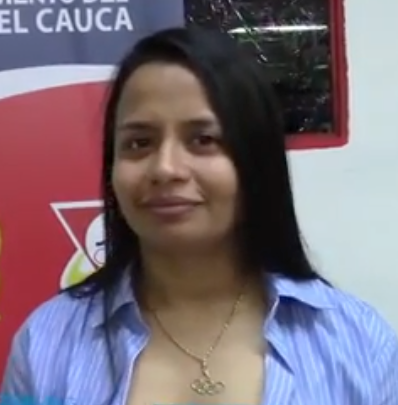
- In a 2024 interview

Personal information
- Born: 20 February 1987 (age 39) Cali, Colombia

Sport
- Sport: Judo
Medal record
Representing Colombia
Pan American Championships
Silver medal – second place	2009 Buenos Aires	–48 kg
Bronze medal – third place	2012 Montreal	–48 kg
Bronze medal – third place	2018 San José	–48 kg
South American Games
Bronze medal – third place	2010 Medellín	–48 kg
Bronze medal – third place	2014 Santiago	–48 kg
Central American and Caribbean Games
Bronze medal – third place	2006 Cartagena	–44 kg
Bronze medal – third place	2014 Veracruz	–48 kg

Luz Adiela Alvarez Salazar (born 20 February 1987) is a female judoka from Colombia.

== Bio ==
Alvarez is a member of Liga Vallecaucana de Judo club and trains with world champion and Olympian Yuri Alvear.

== Judo ==
She is a member of Colombian national judo squad in extra-lightweight category and is a medal winner from continental games and championships.

== Achievements ==
Year	Tournament	Place	Weight class
2009	Pan American Judo Championships	2nd	Extra-Lightweight (- 48 kg)
2010	South American Games	3rd	Extra-Lightweight (- 48 kg)
2010	Pan American Judo Championships	5th	Extra-Lightweight (- 48 kg)
