= Yosmani Piker =

Cuban judoka (born 1987)

Personal information
- Born: 26 April 1987 (age 39) Havana, Cuba
- Occupation: Judoka

Sport
- Country: Cuba
- Sport: Judo
- Weight class: ‍–‍60 kg

Achievements and titles
- Olympic Games: R32 (2008)
- World Champ.: R16 (2009)
- Pan American Champ.: (2008, 2009, 2010)
Medal record
Men's judo
Representing Cuba
Pan American Games
Silver medal – second place	2007 Rio de Janeiro	‍–‍60 kg
Pan American Championships
Bronze medal – third place	2008 Miami	‍–‍60 kg
Bronze medal – third place	2009 Buenos Aires	‍–‍60 kg
Bronze medal – third place	2010 San Salvador	‍–‍60 kg
IJF Grand Prix
Silver medal – second place	2009 Hamburg	‍–‍60 kg

Profile at external databases
- IJF: 5289
- JudoInside.com: 43015
- Updated on 3 January 2023

Yosmani Piker (born 26 April 1987 in Havana) is a male judoka from Cuba, who won the silver medal in the extra lightweight division (–60 kg) at the 2007 Pan American Games in Rio de Janeiro, Brazil. He represented his native country at the 2008 Summer Olympics in Beijing, PR China.
