= Antonieta Galleguillos =

Chilean judoka (born 1990)

Personal information
- Born: 9 January 1990 (age 36)
- Occupation: Judoka

Sport
- Country: Chile
- Sport: Judo
- Weight class: –48 kg

Achievements and titles
- World Champ.: R32 (2013)
- Pan American Champ.: (2009)
Medal record
Women's judo
Representing Chile
Pan American Championships
Bronze medal – third place	2009 Buenos Aires	–44 kg
World Juniors Championships
Bronze medal – third place	2009 Paris	–44 kg

Profile at external databases
- IJF: 4332
- JudoInside.com: 56495
- Updated on 12 January 2023

Antonieta Galleguillos-Manque (born 9 January 1990) is a judoka from Chile.

== Bio ==
Antonieta begun with judo at age 13. She is perspective judoka who trains under Cuban Andrés González from 2005.

== Judo ==
She won bronze medal at 2009 World Judo Juniors Championships in Paris. It was first world judo medal for Chile in history.

She already represented her country at 2007 World Judo Championships in Rio de Janeiro but lost both matches soon after beginning by ippon.

The year 2009 was successful for her. She won another bronze at Pan American Judo Championships in Buenos Aires.

Her dream is competing at Olympic Games in London

== Achievements ==
Year	Tournament	Place	Weight class
2007	World Judo Championships	AC	Extra-Lightweight (- 48 kg)
2009	Pan American Judo Championships	3rd	Super Extra-Lightweight (- 44 kg)
2010	South American Games	5th	Super Extra-Lightweight (- 44 kg)
