= Judo at the 2010 South American Games – Men's 100kg =

Judo competition

The Men's 100 kg event at the 2010 South American Games was held on March 19.

== Medalists ==
Gold	Silver	Bronze
Leonardo Leite; Brazil	Camilo Avila; Colombia	Antony Pena; Venezuela; Cristian Schmidt; Argentina

== Results ==
=== Main Bracket ===
Quarterfinals		Semifinals		Final
Rafael Jelves (CHI)	001^{1}
Leonardo Leite (BRA)	100^{2}	Leonardo Leite (BRA)	010^{2}
Cristian Schmidt (ARG)	001H	Antony Pena (VEN)	001^{3}
Antony Pena (VEN)	100^{2}			Leonardo Leite (BRA)	110
Camilo Avila (COL)	100			Camilo Avila (COL)	000^{1}
Martin Sitjar da Silva (PAR)	000	Camilo Avila (COL)	0103^{1}
		Rene de Urriola (PAN)	000^{2}

=== Repechage ===
Round 1
Rafael Jelves (CHI)	010
Cristian Schmidt (ARG)	111^{3}
Martin Sitjar da Silva (PAR)
bye

Round 2
Cristian Schmidt (ARG)	100
Rene de Urriola (PAN)	000
Martin Sitjar da Silva (PAR)	000
Antony Pena (VEN)	100
