= Jacqueline Solís =

Guatemalan judoka (born 1988)

Personal information
- Born: 22 December 1988 (age 37)
- Occupation: Judoka

Sport
- Country: Guatemala
- Sport: Judo
- Weight class: ‍–‍48 kg

Achievements and titles
- Olympic Games: R32 (2024)
- World Champ.: R16 (2024)
- Pan American Champ.: (2009)
Medal record
Women's judo
Representing Guatemala
Pan American Championships
Silver medal – second place	2009 Buenos Aires	‍–‍44 kg

Profile at external databases
- IJF: 10805
- JudoInside.com: 56501
- Updated on 27 July 2024

Jacqueline Arleny Solís-Gutiérrez (born 22 December 1988 in Sacatepéquez) is a judoka from Guatemala.

== Bio ==
She was awarded by Guatemalan NOC as the best female sportsman between April 2008 and April 2009 period in Guatemala.

Her younger sister Evelyn is also a judoka.

== Judo ==
Her only medal from a big competition is silver at Pan American Judo Championships in Buenos Aires. It was her first competition outside Central America.

== Achievements ==
Year	Tournament	Place	Weight class
2009	Pan American Judo Championships	2nd	Super Extra-Lightweight (- 44 kg)
