= Mónica Heredia =

Ecuadorian judoka (born 1991)

Medal record

Representing Ecuador

Women's judo

Pan American Championships
Silver medal – second place	2015 Edmonton	–44 kg
Bronze medal – third place	2014 Guayaquil	–44 kg
Bronze medal – third place	2010 San Salvador	–44 kg

South American Games
Bronze medal – third place	2010 Medellín	–44 kg

Ibeth Mónica Heredia Fárez (born 10 May 1991 in Morona Santiago) is a judoka from Ecuador.

In 2010, she won bronze medal at South American Games and Pan American Judo Championships both in non-Olympic Super Extra-Lightweight category to 44 kg.

== Achievements ==
Year	Tournament	Place	Weight class
2010	South American Games	3rd	Super Extra-Lightweight (- 44 kg)
2010	Pan American Judo Championships	3rd	Super Extra-Lightweight (- 44 kg)
