= Fermín Delgado =

Mexican judoka (born 1986)

Medal record

Representing Mexico

Men's judo

Pan American Judo Championships
| Bronze medal – third place | 2010 San Salvador | 55 kg |

Central American and Caribbean Games
| Bronze medal – third place | 2010 Mayagüez | Team |

Fermín Delgado Nieves (born May 21, 1986, in Michoacán) is a judoka from Mexico.
