= Aaron Fukuhara =

American judoka

Medal record

Men's judo

Representing United States

Pan American Judo Championships
Silver medal – second place	2010 San Salvador	55 kg

Aaron Fukuhara (born November 11, 1991) is a judoka from the United States.

He is a member of Gardena Judo Club. He won a silver medal at the Pan American Judo Championships in the non-Olympic super lightweight category to 55 kg.

== Achievements ==
Year	Tournament	Place	Weight class
2010	Pan American Judo Championships	2nd	Super lightweight (55 kg)
2015	Nikkei Games Judo Championships	3rd	Senior Black MW
2016	National Collegiate Judo Championships	1st	60 kg
