= Oritia González =

Argentine judoka (born 1987)

Personal information
- Born: 19 December 1987 (age 38) Comodoro Rivadavia, Chubut, Argentina

Sport
- Sport: Judo
Medal record
Representing Argentina
Pan American Judo Championships
Bronze medal – third place	2009 Buenos Aires	52 kg
South American Games
Bronze medal – third place	2010 Medellín	52 kg

Oritia González-Urbie (born December 19, 1987) is a judoka from Argentina.

She was born in Comodoro Rivadavia but trains in Buenos Aires. It is a problem for sportsmen from cities other than Buenos Aires to find some financing for doing a sport that they like. She is sponsored by Ricardo Fueyo and Walter Ñonquepán, who provide her living in capital city and training in CeNARD.

== Achievements ==
Year	Tournament	Place	Weight class
2009	Pan American Judo Championships	3rd	Half-Lightweight (- 52 kg)
2010	South American Games	3rd	Half-Lightweight (- 52 kg)
2010	Pan American Judo Championships	5th	Half-Lightweight (- 52 kg)
