= Josiane Falco =

Brazilian judoka (born 1988)

Personal information
- Born: July 21, 1988 (age 37) São José do Rio Preto, São Paulo
Medal record
Women's judo
Representing Brazil
Pan American Judo Championships
Bronze medal – third place	2010 San Salvador	–57 kg

Josiane Falco (born July 21, 1988) is a female judoka from Brazil. She won a bronze medal at the 2010 Pan American Judo Championships in the women's –57 kg event.
