= Steffany Garatejo =

Colombian judoka (born 1992)

Medal record

Representing Colombia

Women's judo

Pan American Judo Championships
Gold medal – first place	2009 Buenos Aires	44 kg

South American Games
Silver medal – second place	2010 Medellín	44 kg

Estefani ("Steffany") Garatejo-Barragán (born 20 July 1992 in Tolima) is a judoka from Colombia.

== Bio ==
Steffany Garatejo was born in small village in Tolima but her family decided to move in capital city, Bogotá, due to violence in the region. They settled in the Sierra Morena district, Ciudad Bolívar, where Steffany started visiting Judo "bee" in her basic school at age 10. In the beginning, she was not sure if she wants to be a judoka. It changed when she found that judo is not just a sport.

She moved to sport club El Salitre. First years she spent most of her time with traveling because way from district where she lived and place where is her club takes almost 2 hours. She said, in an interview, that her typical day was waking up about 5 a.m. Before school doing some house works. 4-6 p.m. training in El Salitre then travelling at home where she was about 9 p.m. Her mother always waited her and they together climbed up to hill where was their house.

This traveling ended due to her gains in National Championships, where she always took first place. She got a room in Deportel hotel which is paid by The Colombian Institute of Sport. She spends weekends with her family. Her younger brother wants to be a taekwondist.

== Judo ==
Steffany's biggest success is winning gold medal at Pan American Judo Championships in 2009. She was the youngest participant from all 4 girls who competed in the "super extra-lightweight category. She said after championships that she felt like little girl against them. She was very nervous but when her trainer Wilfredo Duardo told her that she will lose nothing then she decided to beat all of them. She did it and won gold.

Her trainer Wilfredo Duardo said that Steffany is a very specific judoka. She has temperament and aggression on tatami, but outside, she is responsible, tractable, hardworking.

== Achievements ==
Year	Tournament	Place	Weight class
2009	Pan American Judo Championships	1st	Super Extra-Lightweight (- 44 kg)
2010	South American Games	2nd	Super Extra-Lightweight (- 44 kg)
