= Gadiel Miranda =

Puerto Rican judoka (born 1986)

Personal information
- Born: 4 January 1986 (age 40)

Sport
- Sport: Judo
Medal record
Representing Puerto Rico
Pan American Games
Silver medal – second place	2011 Guadalajara	81kg
Central American and Caribbean Games
Silver medal – second place	2010 Mayaguez	81kg
Bronze medal – third place	2014 Veracruz	81kg

Gadiel A. Miranda (born 4 January 1986) is a judoka from Puerto Rico. He won a silver medal in the -81 kg division at the 2010 Central American and Caribbean Games . In 2011, he participated in the Pan American Games in Guadalajara, Mexico, winning another silver medal. At the 2014 Central American and Caribbean Games judo competition in Veracruz, Mexico, he won a bronze medal.
