= Sérgio Pessoa =

Canadian judoka

Personal information
- Born: 3 September 1988 (age 37) São Paulo, Brazil
- Occupation: Judoka

Sport
- Country: Canada
- Sport: Judo
- Weight class: ‍–‍60 kg

Achievements and titles
- Olympic Games: R32 (2012, 2016)
- World Champ.: R16 (2013)
- Pan American Champ.: (2012, 2016)
Medal record
Men's judo
Representing Canada
Pan American Championships
| Silver medal – second place | 2012 Montreal | ‍–‍60 kg |
| Silver medal – second place | 2016 Havana | ‍–‍60 kg |
IJF Grand Prix
| Bronze medal – third place | 2010 Rotterdam | ‍–‍60 kg |
| Bronze medal – third place | 2013 Rijeka | ‍–‍60 kg |
Jeux de la Francophonie
| Gold medal – first place | 2013 Nice | ‍–‍60 kg |

Profile at external databases
- IJF: 124
- JudoInside.com: 42684
- Updated on 27 December 2022

Sérgio Pessoa (born 3 September 1988) is a Brazilian-born Canadian judoka who competes in the men's 60 kg category.

== Career ==
At the 2012 Summer Olympics, he was defeated in the second round. He finished 5th at the 2015 Pan American Games.

Since the 2012 Summer Olympics, Sergio underwent two major knee surgeries, from which many thought he would never recover. In 2014, he finally made it back to the tatami with his eye on the 2016 Summer Olympics in Rio.

In June 2016, he was named to Canada's Olympic team.

== Honours ==
In 2012 Pessoa was awarded the Queen Elizabeth II Diamond Jubilee Medal.

== Personal life ==
His father, also named Sergio competed at the 1988 Summer Olympics in the same weight class he competes in (60 kg) and finished in ninth. His family moved from São Paulo to Kedgwick, New Brunswick in 2005 when his dad got a job coaching judo. His father had originally worked as a stock broker but wanted his sons to have a better life and a better education in Canada.

== See also ==
- Judo in Quebec
- Judo in Canada
- List of Canadian judoka
