= Sandra Sánchez (judoka) =

Mexican judoka (born 1990)

Personal information
- Full name: Sandra Ivonne Sánchez Soriano
- Born: March 20, 1990 (age 36) Morelia, Michoacán, Mexico

Sport
- Sport: Judo
Medal record
Women's Judo
Representing Mexico
Pan American Judo Championships
Gold medal – first place	2010 San Salvador	44 kg
Bronze medal – third place	2013 San José	44 kg
Bronze medal – third place	2014 Guayaquil	44 kg
Central American and Caribbean Games
Silver medal – second place	2014 Veracruz	44 kg
Bronze medal – third place	2010 Mayagüez	Team
- Updated on 04 August 2015

Sandra Ivonne Sánchez Soriano (born March 20, 1990, in Morelia, Michoacán) is a female judoka from Mexico.
