= Ysis Barreto =

Venezuelan judoka (born 1980)

Personal information
- Born: 27 March 1980 (age 46) Caracas, Venezuela

Sport
- Sport: Judo
Medal record
Representing Venezuela
Pan American Judo Championships
Bronze medal – third place	2009 Buenos Aires	63 kg
Central American and Caribbean Games
Silver medal – second place	2006 Cartagena	-70 kg
Silver medal – second place	2010 Mayaguez	63 kg
Bronze medal – third place	2006 Cartagena	Team
South American Games
Bronze medal – third place	2010 Medellín	63 kg

Ysis (Isis) Lenis Barreto Rodríguez (Note: In this Spanish name, the first or paternal surname is Barreto and the second or maternal family name is Rodríguez.) (born 27 March 1980) is a judoka from Venezuela.

== Early and personal life ==
Barreto was born in Caracas and began judo when she was 13 years old.

She is member of Judo Anzoátegui club in Barcelona (Venezuela)

After the 2008 Summer Olympics in Beijing, she wanted to retire, but decided against it. She said in an interview that she would like to compete at 2012 Olympic Games in London, but that "it won't be possible without a good trainer."

== Judo career ==
Barreto won the silver medal of the under 70 kg division of the 2006 Central American and Caribbean Games.

At the 2008 Summer Olympics in Beijing in first match, she stood against Senegalese Cécile Hane and won. Her second match was against the Japanese Olympic Champion from Athens, Ayumi Tanimoto. She had tried various techniques, but the skilled Japanese judoka always countered it. Ayumi waited for her moment, which came after two minutes into the match. She took Barreto and held her for 25 seconds. Barreto lost by ippon (Yoko-shiho-gatame). She won her third match.

== Achievements ==
Year	Tournament	Place	Weight class
2008	Olympic Games	7th	Half-Middleweight (- 63 kg)
2009	Pan American Judo Championships	3rd	Half-Middleweight (- 63 kg)
2010	South American Games	3rd	Half-Middleweight (- 63 kg)
2010	Pan American Judo Championships	7th	Half-Middleweight (- 63 kg)
