= Taylor Ibera =

American judoka

Medal record

Representing United States

Women's judo

Pan American Judo Championships
Gold medal – first place	2008 Miami	44 kg
Bronze medal – third place	2009 Buenos Aires	44 kg

Taylor Ibera (born July 7, 1991 in Honolulu, Hawaii) is a judoka and wrestler from United States.

== Bio ==
Ibera was born in Honolulu. Her home dojo is Hawaii Tenri Judo club. During studies at Farrington High School she was competing in judo and also in wrestling. In both sports she was very successful on national level.

Today she studies at San Jose State University sport medicine.

== Judo ==
On national level she is two time winner of USA Judo National Championships in 2007 and 2008.

In 2009 (*- 48 kg) and 2010 she took bronze medal.

Her biggest success on international level is winning gold medal at 2008 Pan American Judo Championships in Miami. Next year at 2009 Pan American Judo Championships she took bronze medal.

== Achievements ==
Year	Tournament	Place	Weight class
2008	Pan American Judo Championships	1st	Super Extra-Lightweight (- 44 kg)
2009	Pan American Judo Championships	3rd	Super Extra-Lightweight (- 44 kg)
