= Judo at the 2010 South American Games – Women's +78kg =

The Women's +78 kg event at the 2010 South American Games was held on March 19.

== Medalists ==
Gold	Silver	Bronze
Carmen Chalá; Ecuador	Giovanna Blanco; Venezuela	Priscila Silva; Brazil

== Results ==
=== Round Robin ===
Class	Athlete	Contest			Points		
Class	Athlete	Pld	W	L	W	L	Diff
1st place, gold medalist(s)	Carmen Chalá (ECU)	2	2	0	11	0	+11
2nd place, silver medalist(s)	Giovanna Blanco (VEN)	2	1	1	10	10	0
3rd place, bronze medalist(s)	Priscila Silva (BRA)	2	0	2	0	11	-11

Points system:

10	Ippon/Hansoku Make
7	Waza-ari/Shido(3)
5	Yuko/Shido (2)
1	Yusei-gachi (decision)

=== Contests ===
1	Giovanna Blanco (VEN)	(10) 102	—	002^{2} (0)	Priscila Silva (BRA)
2	Priscila Silva (BRA)	(0) 000	—	000 GS (1)	Carmen Chalá (ECU)
3	Giovanna Blanco (VEN)	(0) 000^{2}	—	121 (10)	Carmen Chalá (ECU)
