= Yaritza Abel =

Cuban judoka (born 1983)

Personal information
- Full name: Yaritza Abel Rojas
- Born: 26 August 1983 (age 42) Santiago de Cuba, Cuba
- Occupation: Judoka

Sport
- Country: Cuba
- Sport: Judo
- Weight class: ‍–‍63 kg

Achievements and titles
- Olympic Games: R16 (2012)
- World Champ.: (bronze) (2010)
- Pan American Champ.: (2006, 2010, 2011, 2012)
Medal record
Women's judo
Representing Cuba
World Championships
Bronze medal – third place	2010 Tokyo	‍–‍63 kg
Pan American Games
Gold medal – first place	2011 Guadalajara	‍–‍63 kg
Pan American Championships
Gold medal – first place	2006 Buenos Aires	‍–‍63 kg
Gold medal – first place	2010 San Salvador	‍–‍63 kg
Gold medal – first place	2011 Guadalajara	‍–‍63 kg
Gold medal – first place	2012 Montreal	‍–‍63 kg
IJF Grand Prix
Bronze medal – third place	2009 Hamburg	‍–‍63 kg

Profile at external databases
- IJF: 955
- JudoInside.com: 12665
- Updated on 25 July 2023

Yaritza Abel Rojas (Note: In this Spanish name, the first or paternal surname is Abel and the second or maternal family name is Rojas.) (born 26 August 1983) is a judoka from Cuba.
