= Danielli Yuri =

Brazilian judoka (born 1984)

Personal information
- Born: January 3, 1984 (age 42) Registro, São Paulo, Brazil

Sport
- Sport: Judo
Medal record
Women's judo
Representing Brazil
Pan American Games
Silver medal – second place	2007 Rio de Janeiro	63 kg
Pan American Judo Championships
Silver medal – second place	2008 Montreal	63 kg
Silver medal – second place	2009 Buenos Aires	63 kg

Danielli Yuri-Barbosa (born January 3, 1984) is a judoka from Brazil.

== Biography ==
Yuri-Barbosa was born in Registro, São Paulo, but she lives in São Caetano do Sul.

She began with judo in Japan. When she was little her family moved to Japan to make some money. Her father worked there in factories and when they came back to Brazil he opened a judo school.

Yuri likes to be with her family, she likes reading, watching movies. Her favorite actor is Samuel L. Jackson. She can't to say "no" when somebody asked her for a favor and during matches she uses same hairgrip.

Before the 2008 Olympic Games in Beijing, the Brazilian Judo Federation was unsure who would represent Brazil in half-middleweight. They hesitated between mature Vânia Ishii and young Yuri, but Yuri was chosen.

== Judo ==
At the 2008 Olympic Games in Beijing she was eliminated in the first round by Korean Kong Ja-young. It was an aggressive match where Yuri was leading by wazari but two minutes before the end she made a mistake and Kong won by ippon.

== Achievements ==
Year	Tournament	Place	Weight class
2007	Pan American Games	2nd	Half-Middleweight (- 63 kg)
2008	Pan American Judo Championships	2nd	Half-Middleweight (- 63 kg)
2008	Olympic Games	18th	Half-Middleweight (- 63 kg)
2009	Pan American Judo Championships	2nd	Half-Middleweight (- 63 kg)
