= Helena Romanelli =

Brazilian judoka (born 1987)

Personal information
- Born: 1 September 1987 (age 38)
- Occupation: Judoka

Sport
- Country: Brazil
- Sport: Judo
- Weight class: –70 kg

Achievements and titles
- Pan American Champ.: (2010)
Medal record
Women's judo
Representing Brazil
Pan American Championships
Silver medal – second place	2010 San Salvador	–70 kg
IJF Grand Slam
Bronze medal – third place	2012 Rio de Janeiro	–70 kg

Profile at external databases
- IJF: 2467
- JudoInside.com: 66261
- Updated on 27 November 2022

Helena Romanelli (born 1 September 1987) is a judoka from Brazil.
