= Judo at the 2010 South American Games – Women's 48kg =

Judo competition

The Women's 48 kg event at the 2010 South American Games was held on March 20.

== Medalists ==
Gold	Silver	Bronze
Paula Pareto; Argentina	Daniela Polzin; Brazil	Liliana Coloma; Peru; Luz Álvarez; Colombia

== Results ==
=== Main Bracket ===
Quarterfinals
Diana Belen Morales (ECU)	020
Maria Luz Martinez (BOL)	000^{3}
Liliana Coloma (PER)	100
Luz Álvarez (COL)	000H

Semifinals
Diana Belen Morales (ECU)	000
Daniela Polzin (BRA)	100
Liliana Coloma (PER)	000
Paula Pareto (ARG)	101^{1}

Final
Daniela Polzin (BRA)	000^{1}
Paula Pareto (ARG)	100^{1}

=== Repechage ===
Round 1
Maria Luz Martinez (BOL)
bye
Luz Álvarez (COL)
bye

Round 2
Maria Luz Martinez (BOL)	001^{2}
Liliana Coloma (PER)	112^{2}
Luz Álvarez (COL)	100
Diana Belen Morales (ECU)	000
