= Stéfanie Tremblay =

Canadian judoka (born 1990)

Personal information
- Born: 18 July 1990 (age 36) Chicoutimi (now Saguenay), Quebec, Canada
- Home town: Montreal, Quebec
- Occupation: Judoka
- Height: 163 cm (5 ft 4 in)

Sport
- Country: Canada
- Sport: Judo
- Weight class: ‍–‍57 kg, ‍–‍63 kg

Achievements and titles
- World Champ.: R16 (2018)
- Pan American Champ.: (2016)
Medal record
Women's judo
Representing Canada
Pan American Games
Silver medal – second place	2015 Toronto	‍–‍63 kg
Bronze medal – third place	2011 Guadalajara	‍–‍63 kg
Pan American Championships
Bronze medal – third place	2016 Havana	‍–‍63 kg
IJF Grand Prix
Bronze medal – third place	2017 The Hague	‍–‍63 kg

Profile at external databases
- IJF: 1010
- JudoInside.com: 47416
- Updated on 6 December 2022

Stéfanie Tremblay (born 18 July 1990) is a Canadian judoka. Tremblay won a silver for Canada at the 2015 Pan American Games.

== See also ==
- Judo in Canada
- List of Canadian judoka
