= Dodanim Barboza =

Colombian judoka (born 1993)

Personal information
- Born: 4 December 1993 (age 32)
- Occupation: Judoka

Sport
- Sport: Judo
Medal record
Representing Colombia
Men's judo
Pan American Judo Championships
Silver medal – second place	2009 Buenos Aires	‍–‍55 kg

Profile at external databases
- IJF: 1292
- JudoInside.com: 58460, 56497

Dodanim Barboza-García (born December 4, 1993, in Aguachica) is a judoka from Colombia.

== Bio ==
Dodanim lives and in Aguachica, Cesar. His father is president of local club "Judo del Cesar" where he trains.

In 2007 he was chosen as the best youth judoka of America (UPJ).

== Judo ==
He won silver medal on Pan American Judo Championships in non-Olympic super lightweight category to 55 kg.

== Achievements ==
Year	Tournament	Place	Weight class
2009	Pan American Judo Championships	2nd	Super Lightweight (‍–‍55 kg)
