= Judo at the 2010 South American Games – Women's 52kg =

The Women's 52 kg event at the 2010 South American Games was held on March 20.

== Medalists ==
Gold	Silver	Bronze
Andressa Fernandes; Brazil	Wisneybi Machado; Venezuela	Yulieth Sánchez; Colombia; Oritia González; Argentina

== Results ==
=== Main Bracket ===
Quarterfinals
Glenda Miranda (ECU)	101
Juanita Aldana (BOL)	000
Lesly Angela Jimenez (PER)	000^{1}
Wisneybi Machado (VEN)	003^{1}
Belen Achurra le Blanc (CHI)	000^{2}
Andressa Fernandes (BRA)	001^{1}
Oritia González (ARG)	001^{2}
Yulieth Sánchez (COL)	011^{2}

Semifinals
Glenda Miranda (ECU)	000
Wisneybi Machado (VEN)	110^{1}
Andressa Fernandes (BRA)	100^{1}
Yulieth Sánchez (COL)	000

Final
Wisneybi Machado (VEN)	000
Andressa Fernandes (BRA)	100^{1}

=== Repechage ===
Round 1
Juanita Aldana (BOL)	000
Lesly Angela Jimenez (PER)	100
Belen Achurra le Blanc (CHI)	000
Oritia González (ARG)	101

Round 2
Lesly Angela Jimenez (PER)	000
Yulieth Sánchez (COL)	100
Oritia González (ARG)	100
Glenda Miranda (ECU)	000
