= Déborah Souza =

Brazilian judoka (born 1982)

Medal record

Representing Brazil

Women's judo

Pan American Judo Championships
Bronze medal – third place	2009 Buenos Aires	78 kg

Déborah Almeida de Souza (born October 19, 1982 in Rio de Janeiro) is a judoka from Brazil.

== Biography ==
Souza was born in Rio de Janeiro and begun with judo when she was 12 in Judô Clube Joaquim Mamede. Later she moved in bigger club Gama Filho.

== Judo ==
She won bronze medal at 2009 Pan American Judo Championships in half-heavyweight category.

== Achievements ==
Year	Tournament	Place	Weight class
2009	Pan American Judo Championships	3rd	Half-Heavyweight (- 63 kg)
