= Carlos Santiago (judoka) =

Puerto Rican judoka (born 1977)

Personal information
- Born: 9 December 1977 (age 48)

Sport
- Sport: Judo
Medal record
Representing Puerto Rico
Central American and Caribbean Games
Gold medal – first place	2010 Mayaguez	-100 kg
Silver medal – second place	1998 Maracaibo	-90 kg
Bronze medal – third place	2010 Mayaguez	Open weight
Bronze medal – third place	2010 Mayaguez	Team
Pan American Judo Championships
Silver medal – second place	2005 Caguas	Open Weight
Bronze medal – third place	2010 San Salvador	Open Weight

Carlos Santiago Alicea OLY (born December 9, 1977) is a judoka from Puerto Rico. He competed in the 2000 Summer Olympics.
