= Judo at the 2010 South American Games – Women's open =

The Women's Open event at the 2010 South American Games was held on March 21.

== Medalists ==
Gold	Silver	Bronze
Giovanna Blanco; Venezuela	Steffani Lupetti; Brazil	Carmen Chalá; Ecuador

== Results ==
=== Round Robin ===
Class	Athlete	Contest			Points		
Class	Athlete	Pld	W	L	W	L	Diff
1st place, gold medalist(s)	Giovanna Blanco (VEN)	2	2	0	12	0	+12
2nd place, silver medalist(s)	Steffani Lupetti (BRA)	2	1	1	5	7	–2
3rd place, bronze medalist(s)	Carmen Chalá (ECU)	2	0	2	0	10	–10

Points system:

10	Ippon/Hansoku Make
7	Waza-ari/Shido(3)
5	Yuko/Shido (2)
1	Yusei-gachi (decision)

=== Contests ===
1	Steffani Lupetti (BRA)	(5) 001^{1}	—	000^{2} (0)	Carmen Chalá (ECU)
2	Giovanna Blanco (VEN)	(7) 012	—	000^{3}	Steffani Lupetti (BRA)
3	Carmen Chalá (ECU)	(0) 000^{2}	—	001 (5)	Giovanna Blanco (VEN)
