= Cristian Schmidt =

Argentinian Olympic judoka

Personal information
- Born: 13 August 1982 (age 43)
- Occupation: Judoka

Sport
- Country: Argentina
- Sport: Judo
- Weight class: –90 kg, –100 kg

Achievements and titles
- Olympic Games: R32 (2012)
- World Champ.: R32 (2013)
- Pan American Champ.: (2009, 2012)
Medal record
Men's judo
Representing Argentina
Pan American Games
Bronze medal – third place	2011 Guadalajara	–100 kg
Pan American Championships
Silver medal – second place	2009 Buenos Aires	–100 kg
Silver medal – second place	2012 Montreal	–100 kg
Bronze medal – third place	2010 San Salvador	–100 kg
Bronze medal – third place	2011 Guadalajara	–100 kg
Bronze medal – third place	2015 Edmonton	–90 kg
IJF Grand Slam
Bronze medal – third place	2012 Rio de Janeiro	–100 kg

Profile at external databases
- IJF: 586
- JudoInside.com: 31662
- Updated on 27 November 2022

Cristian Schmidt (born 13 August 1982 in Buenos Aires, Argentina) is an Argentine judoka. He competed at the 2012 Summer Olympics in the -100 kg event.

Notable results in individual events in Schmidt's career include the bronze medals at the 2011 Pan Am Games and at the 2010 South American Games.
