= José Vásquez (judoka) =

Dominican judoka (born 1979)

Personal information
- Full name: José Eugenio Vásquez de Jesús
- Nationality: Dominican Republic
- Born: 5 March 1979 (age 47) Santo Domingo, Dominican; Republic
- Height: 1.85 m (6 ft 1 in)
- Weight: 100 kg (220 lb)

Sport
- Sport: Judo
- Event: 100 kg
Medal record
Men's judo
Representing Dominican Republic
Central American and Caribbean Games
Bronze medal – third place	2010 Mayagüez	+100 kg

José Eugenio Vásquez de Jesús (born March 5, 1979) is a judoka from the Dominican Republic, who competed in the men's heavyweight category. He picked up a total of fifteen medals in his career, including a bronze from the 2010 Central American and Caribbean Games in Mayagüez, Puerto Rico, attained a fifth-place finish in the 100-kg division at the 2003 Pan American Games in his native Santo Domingo, and represented his nation Dominican Republic in both 100 and over-100 kg class in two editions of the Olympic Games (2000 and 2004).

== Career ==
Vasquez made his official debut at the 2000 Summer Olympics in Sydney, where he competed in the men's over-100 kg division. He lost his opening match to Kazakhstan's Vyacheslav Berduta, who immediately pushed him down the tatami using the small outer hook (kosoto gake) to produce an ippon victory inside 37 seconds.

At the 2004 Summer Olympics in Athens, Vasquez reduced his weight to 100 kg, and qualified for his second Dominican Republic squad in the men's half-heavyweight category, by granting an unused berth from the International Judo Federation and the Dominican Republic Olympic Committee (Spanish: Comité Olímpico Dominicano). Vasquez could not improve his feat from the previous Games, as he conceded with a penalty and succumbed to an ippon and a tani otoshi (valley drop) from Finland's Timo Peltola before the five-minute regulation expired during their opening match.
