= Anny Cortés =

Colombian judoka (born 1990)

Personal information
- Born: 4 January 1990 (age 36) Cali, Colombia

Sport
- Sport: Judo
Medal record
Representing Colombia
Pan American Judo Championships
Silver medal – second place	2009 Buenos Aires	–78 kg
Bronze medal – third place	2011 Guadalajara	–78 kg
South American Games
Silver medal – second place	2010 Medellín	–78 kg
Central American and Caribbean Games
Gold medal – first place	2010 Mayaguez	-78 kg
Bronze medal – third place	2006 Cartagena	Team
Bronze medal – third place	2010 Mayaguez	Team

Anny Lorena Cortés Ortíz (born January 4, 1990) is a judoka from Colombia.

== Early and personal life ==
Anny is a member of Liga Vallecaucana de Judo club and a friend to the Olympian Yuri Alvear.

In autumn 2009 she underwent surgery of knee so she could not start at Brazil Judo Grand Prix.

== Judo career ==
She is a member of the Colombian national judo squad in the half-heavyweight category and is a medal winner from the continental games and championships. Her sparring partner is Yuri Alvear.

Cortés won the bronze medal for the team competition in the 2006 Central American and Caribbean Games. She also won the gold medal for the under 78 kg and the bronze in team competition at the 2010 Central American and Caribbean Games.

== Achievements ==
Year	Tournament	Place	Weight class
2009	Pan American Judo Championships	2nd	Half-Heavyweight (–78 kg)
2010	South American Games	2nd	Half-Heavyweight (–78 kg)
2010	Pan American Judo Championships	5th	Half-Heavyweight (–78 kg)
2011	Pan American Judo Championships	3rd	Half-Heavyweight (–78 kg)
