= Jeanette Rodriguez (judoka) =

American judoka

Personal information
- Born: July 22, 1990 (age 35)
- Occupation: Judoka

Sport
- Sport: Judo
Medal record
Women's judo
Representing United States
Pan American Games
Bronze medal – third place	2007 Rio de Janeiro	–48 kg
Pan American Judo Championships
Bronze medal – third place	2010 San Salvador	–52 kg

Profile at external databases
- JudoInside.com: 34044

Jeanette Alyssa Rodriguez (born July 22, 1990) is a judoka from United States.
