= Kenny Hashimoto =

American judoka (born 1986)

Personal information
- Born: July 7, 1986 (age 39) Westminster, Colorado, United States

Sport
- Sport: Judo
Medal record
Representing United States
Pan American Games
Silver medal – second place	2011 Guadalajara	66 kg

Kenneth Hashimoto (born July 7, 1986) is an American judoka. He is a member of Team USA for the sport of Judo at the 66 kg division.

Born in Westminster, Colorado to Japanese parents, Hashimoto was an Olympic Alternate for Judo in the 2004 Olympic Games in Athens, Greece. Hashimoto was a scholarship wrestler at the University of North Colorado. He was born in Westminster, Colorado and is currently ranked #2 in the United States at 66 kg. Hashimoto was the USA Today Athlete of the Week, when he won the Irish Open.

Hashimoto won a silver medal at the 2011 Pan American Games and has been a repeated medalist at the U.S. national championships. He won bronze medals in 2005, 2006, and 2007; silver medals in 2004 and 2008; and the gold medal in 2010. This allowed him to compete in the 2010 world championships where he won one bout before losing to a Japanese competitor.
