= Sergio García (judoka) =

Mexican judoka (born 1987)

Personal information
- Full name: Sergio García Malfavón
- Born: August 14, 1987 (age 38) Uruapan, Michoacán, Mexico
- Height: 1.95 m (6 ft 5 in)

Sport
- Sport: Judo
Medal record
Men's Judo
Representing Mexico
Pan American Games
| Bronze medal – third place | 2011 Guadalajara | Half-heavyweight |
Central American and Caribbean Games
| Silver medal – second place | 2010 Mayagüez | 100 kg |
| Silver medal – second place | 2014 Veracruz | 100 kg |
| Bronze medal – third place | 2010 Mayagüez | Team |
- Updated on 01 August 2015

Sergio García Malfavón (born 14 August 1987, in Uruapan, Michoacán) is a judo practitioner from Mexico who competes in the men's half-heavyweight division.

García has won multiple medals representing his country at the Central American and Caribbean Games and at the Pan American Games.
