= Garry St. Leger =

American judoka (born 1985)

Medal record

Representing United States

Men's judo

Pan American Judo Championships
| Bronze medal – third place | 2010 San Salvador | 90 kg |

World Cup
| Bronze medal – third place | 2010 Miami | 90 kg |

Garry St. Leger (born July 24, 1985) is a judoka from United States.
