= Diego Ochoa =

Diego Ochoa may refer to:

- Diego Ochoa (cyclist) (born 1993), Colombian cyclist
- Diego Ochoa (footballer, born 2002), Mexican football defender for Notre Dame Fighting Irish
- Diego Ochoa (footballer, born 2005), Mexican football centre-back for Guadalajara
