= Alexis Chiclana =

Puerto Rican Olympic judoka (born 1987)

Personal information
- Full name: Alexis Chiclana Melendez
- Nationality: Puerto Rico
- Born: 2 February 1987 (age 39) San Juan, Puerto Rico
- Height: 1.80 m (5 ft 11 in)
- Weight: 86 kg (190 lb)

Sport
- Sport: Judo
- Event: 90 kg
Medal record
Men's judo
Representing Puerto Rico
Central American and Caribbean Games
| Bronze medal – third place | 2010 Mayagüez | 90 kg |

Alexis Chiclana Meléndez (Note: In this Spanish name, the first or paternal surname is Chiclana and the second or maternal family name is Meléndez.) (born February 2, 1987) is a Puerto Rican judoka, who played for the middleweight category. He won a bronze medal for his division at the 2010 Central American and Caribbean Games in Mayagüez, Puerto Rico.

Chiclana represented Puerto Rico at the 2008 Summer Olympics in Beijing, where he competed for the men's middleweight class (90 kg). He lost the first preliminary match, with an ippon and an uchi mata (inner thigh throw), to Spain's David Alarza.
