= Lorena Briceño =

Argentine judoka (born 1978)

Personal information
- Born: April 19, 1978 (age 48)
- Occupation: Judoka

Sport
- Sport: Judo
Medal record
Women's judo
Representing Argentina
Pan American Games
Bronze medal – third place	1999 Winnipeg	– 70 kg
Bronze medal – third place	2007 Rio de Janeiro	– 78 kg
South American Games
Bronze medal – third place	2006 Buenos Aires	– 78 kg

Profile at external databases
- JudoInside.com: 1853

Lorena Briceño (born April 19, 1978, in Neuquén) is a female judoka from Argentina. She competed for her native South American country at the 2008 Summer Olympics and won a bronze medal at the 2007 Pan American Games in Rio de Janeiro, Brazil.
