= Diana Velasco =

Colombian judoka (born 1985)

Personal information
- Born: 25 January 1985 (age 41) Cali, Colombia

Sport
- Sport: Judo
Medal record
Representing Colombia
Women's judo
Pan American Judo Championships
Bronze medal – third place	2010 San Salvador	63 kg
South American Games
Gold medal – first place	2010 Medellín	63 kg

Diana Marcela Velasco Gómez (born January 25, 1985, in Cali) is a judoka from Colombia.

== Bio ==
Diana was born in Cali but she lives and trains in capital city Bogotá. She is member of El salitre judo club.

== Judo ==
Her biggest success is winning gold medal at 2010 South American Games in half-middleweight category.

== Achievements ==
Year	Tournament	Place	Weight class
2009	Pan American Judo Championships	5th	Half-Middleweight (- 63 kg)
2010	South American Games	1st	Half-Middleweight (- 63 kg)
2010	Pan American Judo Championships	3rd	Half-Middleweight (- 63 kg)
