= Yulieth Sánchez =

Colombian judoka (born 1988)

Yulieth Sanchéz
Personal information
- Born: 23 May 1988 (age 38) Santander, Colombia
Medal record
Representing Colombia
Women's judo
Pan American Judo Championships
Silver medal – second place	2009 Buenos Aires	52 kg
Gold medal – first place	2010 San Salvador	52 kg
South American Games
Bronze medal – third place	2010 Medellín	52 kg

Yulieth Sanchéz-Bocanegra (born 23 May 1988 in Santander) is a judoka from Colombia.

== Bio ==
Yulieth lives and train in Bucaramanga, Santander. She started with judo around 1999 when she was 11.

She studies physical therapy at Universidad Manuela Beltrán in Bogotá and she is in eight semester (year 2010).

== Judo ==
She is very successful at Pan American Judo Championships, in last two years 2009 and 2010 she always got to final where she stood against Cuban Olympic medalist Yanet Bermoy. Their score is 1:1.

At 2009 World Judo Championships in Rotterdam she lost her only match with Finnish judoka Jaana Sundberg.

== Achievements ==
Year	Tournament	Place	Weight class
2009	Pan American Judo Championships	2nd	Half-Lightweight (- 52 kg)
2009	World Judo Championships	AC	Half-Lightweight (- 52 kg)
2010	South American Games	3rd	Half-Lightweight (- 52 kg)
2010	Pan American Judo Championships	1st	Half-Lightweight (- 52 kg)
