= Orlando Baccino =

Argentine Olympic judoka

Personal information
- Born: December 25, 1970 (age 55) Buenos Aires, Argentina

Sport
- Sport: Judo
Medal record
Representing Argentina
Pan American Games
Silver medal – second place	1991 Havana	Heavyweight
Bronze medal – third place	1991 Havana	Open class
Bronze medal – third place	1995 Mar del Plata	Heavyweight
Bronze medal – third place	1999 Winnipeg	Heavyweight
Pan American Judo Championships
Bronze medal – third place	2010 San Salvador	Openweight
Bronze medal – third place	2011 Guadalajara	+100 kg

Orlando Baccino Granja (born December 25, 1970) is an Argentine male judoka. He claimed the silver medal in the Men's Heavyweight (+ 95 kg) division at the 1991 Pan American Games in Havana, Cuba. Baccino represented his native South American country in four consecutive Summer Olympics, starting in 1992.
