= Ricardo Valderrama =

Venezuelan judoka (born 1987)

Personal information
- Nationality: Venezuelan
- Born: 16 January 1987 (age 39) Caracas, Venezuela

Sport
- Sport: Judo
Medal record
Representing Venezuela
Pan American Games
Bronze medal – third place	2011 Guadalajara	–66 kg
Bronze medal – third place	2019 Lima	–66 kg
Pan American Championships
Bronze medal – third place	2018 San José	–66 kg

Ricardo Valderrama Pérez (born 16 January 1987 in Caracas) is a Venezuelan judoka. At the 2012 Summer Olympics he competed in the Men's 66 kg, but was defeated in the second round.
