= 2010 Pan American Judo Championships =

Judo competition

2010 Judo Pan American Judo Championships
- Venue: San Salvador
- Location: San Salvador, El Salvador
- Dates: 8–11 April 2010
- Competitors: 189 from 18 nations

Competition at external databases
- Links: IJF • JudoInside

The Pan American Judo Championships were held in San Salvador, El Salvador from 8 April to 11 April 2010.

== Medals table ==
* Host nation (El Salvador)

Rank	Nation	Gold	Silver	Bronze	Total
1	Cuba	7	4	3	14
2	Brazil	4	5	6	15
3	Mexico	2	2	2	6
4	Canada	2	0	4	6
5	United States	1	3	7	11
6	El Salvador*	1	2	1	4
7	Colombia	1	0	1	2
8	Argentina	0	1	4	5
9	Venezuela	0	1	2	3
10	Puerto Rico	0	0	4	4
11	Ecuador	0	0	1	1
11	Peru	0	0	1	1
Totals (12 entries)		18	18	36	72

== Results ==
=== Men's events ===
Event	Gold	Silver	Bronze
Super extra-lightweight (55 kg)	Fredy López; El Salvador (ESA)	Aaron Fukuhara; United States (USA)	Fermín Delgado; Mexico (MEX)
Super extra-lightweight (55 kg)	Fredy López; El Salvador (ESA)	Aaron Fukuhara; United States (USA)	Youssef Youssef; Canada (CAN)
Extra-lightweight (60 kg)	Nabor Castillo; Mexico (MEX)	Felipe Kitadai; Brazil (BRA)	Yosmani Piker; Cuba (CUB)
Extra-lightweight (60 kg)	Nabor Castillo; Mexico (MEX)	Felipe Kitadai; Brazil (BRA)	Juan Postigos; Peru (PER)
Half-lightweight (66 kg)	Brad Bolen; United States (USA)	Carlos Figueroa; El Salvador (ESA)	Leandro Cunha; Brazil (BRA)
Half-lightweight (66 kg)	Brad Bolen; United States (USA)	Carlos Figueroa; El Salvador (ESA)	Ricardo Valderrama; Venezuela (VEN)
Lightweight (73 kg)	Nicholas Tritton; Canada (CAN)	Antonio Rivas; Venezuela (VEN)	Ronald Girones; Cuba (CUB)
Lightweight (73 kg)	Nicholas Tritton; Canada (CAN)	Antonio Rivas; Venezuela (VEN)	Bruno Mendonça; Brazil (BRA)
Half-middleweight (81 kg)	Flávio Canto; Brazil (BRA)	Osmay Cruz; Cuba (CUB)	Emmanuel Lucenti; Argentina (ARG)
Half-middleweight (81 kg)	Flávio Canto; Brazil (BRA)	Osmay Cruz; Cuba (CUB)	Travis Stevens; United States (USA)
Middleweight (90 kg)	Hugo Pessanha; Brazil (BRA)	Diego Rosati; Argentina (ARG)	Alexandre Émond; Canada (CAN)
Middleweight (90 kg)	Hugo Pessanha; Brazil (BRA)	Diego Rosati; Argentina (ARG)	Garry St. Leger; United States (USA)
Half-heavyweight (100 kg)	Oreidis Despaigne; Cuba (CUB)	Leonardo Leite; Brazil (BRA)	Cristian Schmitd; Argentina (ARG)
Half-heavyweight (100 kg)	Oreidis Despaigne; Cuba (CUB)	Leonardo Leite; Brazil (BRA)	Kyle Vashkulat; United States (USA)
Heavyweight (+100 kg)	Óscar Brayson; Cuba (CUB)	Daniel Hernandes; Brazil (BRA)	Pablo Figueroa; Puerto Rico (PUR)
Heavyweight (+100 kg)	Óscar Brayson; Cuba (CUB)	Daniel Hernandes; Brazil (BRA)	Daniel McCormick; United States (USA)

=== Women's events ===
Event	Gold	Silver	Bronze
Super extra-lightweight (44 kg)	Sandra Sánchez; Mexico (MEX)	Stefany García; El Salvador (ESA)	Ibeth Heredia; Ecuador (ECU)
Super extra-lightweight (44 kg)	Sandra Sánchez; Mexico (MEX)	Stefany García; El Salvador (ESA)	Alexa Liddie; United States (USA)
Extra-lightweight (48 kg)	Sarah Menezes; Brazil (BRA)	Dayaris Mestre Alvarez; Cuba (CUB)	Paula Pareto; Argentina (ARG)
Extra-lightweight (48 kg)	Sarah Menezes; Brazil (BRA)	Dayaris Mestre Alvarez; Cuba (CUB)	Edna Carrillo; Mexico (MEX)
Half-lightweight (52 kg)	Yulieth Sánchez; Colombia (COL)	Yanet Bermoy; Cuba (CUB)	Wisneybi Machado; Venezuela (VEN)
Half-lightweight (52 kg)	Yulieth Sánchez; Colombia (COL)	Yanet Bermoy; Cuba (CUB)	Jeanette Rodriguez; United States (USA)
Lightweight (57 kg)	Yurisleidy Lupetey; Cuba (CUB)	Marti Malloy; United States (USA)	Josiane Falco; Brazil (BRA)
Lightweight (57 kg)	Yurisleidy Lupetey; Cuba (CUB)	Marti Malloy; United States (USA)	Joliane Melançon; Canada (CAN)
Half-middleweight (63 kg)	Yaritza Abel; Cuba (CUB)	Janine Nakao; United States (USA)	Mariana Silva; Brazil (BRA)
Half-middleweight (63 kg)	Yaritza Abel; Cuba (CUB)	Janine Nakao; United States (USA)	Diana Velasco; Colombia (COL)
Middleweight (70 kg)	Kelita Zupancic; Canada (CAN)	Helena Romanelli; Brazil (BRA)	Onix Cortés; Cuba (CUB)
Middleweight (70 kg)	Kelita Zupancic; Canada (CAN)	Helena Romanelli; Brazil (BRA)	Saraí Mendoza; El Salvador (ESA)
Half-heavyweight (78 kg)	Mayra Aguiar; Brazil (BRA)	Yalennis Castillo; Cuba (CUB)	Kayla Harrison; United States (USA)
Half-heavyweight (78 kg)	Mayra Aguiar; Brazil (BRA)	Yalennis Castillo; Cuba (CUB)	Catherine Roberge; Canada (CAN)
Heavyweight (+78 kg)	Idalys Ortiz; Cuba (CUB)	Vanessa Zambotti; Mexico (MEX)	Maria Suelen Altheman; Brazil (BRA)
Heavyweight (+78 kg)	Idalys Ortiz; Cuba (CUB)	Vanessa Zambotti; Mexico (MEX)	Melissa Mojica; Puerto Rico (PUR)
