= Ronda Rousey =

American mixed martial artist (born 1987)

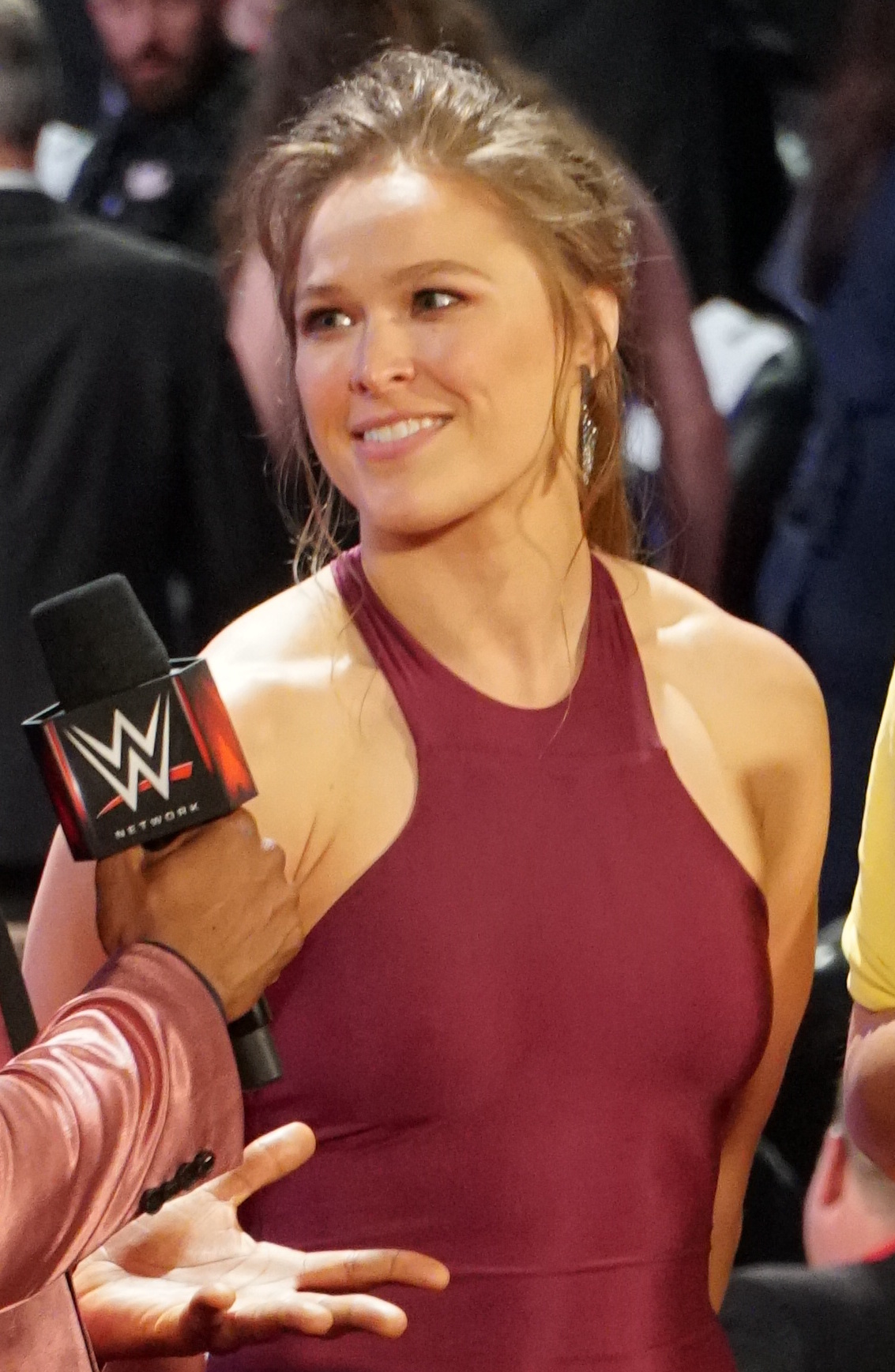
- Rousey in 2018
- Born: Ronda Jean Rousey; February 1, 1987 (age 39); Riverside, California, U.S.
- Other name: Rowdy
- Spouse: Travis Browne (m. 2017)
- Children: 2
- Mother: AnnMaria De Mars
- Martial arts career
- Height: 5 ft 6 in (168 cm)
- Weight: 142 lb (64 kg; 10 st 2 lb)
- Division: Featherweight (2010–2011, 2026); Bantamweight (2012–2016)
- Reach: 68 in (173 cm)
- Style: Judo
- Stance: Orthodox
- Fighting out of: Santa Monica, California, U.S. Venice, California, U.S.
- Team: Glendale Fighting Club; Gokor Hayastan Academy; SK Golden Boys
- Trainer: MMA: Ricky Lundell; Grappling: Gene LeBell, Rener Gracie, Gokor Chivichyan, AnnMaria De Mars; Boxing: Edmond Tarverdyan; Wrestling: Leo Frîncu; Striking: AJ Matthews, Ryan Benoit
- Years active: 2010–2016; 2026 (MMA); 2018–2019; 2022–2023 (Professional wrestling)

Mixed martial arts record
- Total: 15
- Wins: 13
- By knockout: 3
- By submission: 10
- Losses: 2
- By knockout: 2

Amateur record
- Total: 3
- Wins: 3
- By submission: 3
- Losses: 0

Other information
- Website: rondarousey.com
- Mixed martial arts record from Sherdog
- Judo career
- Rank: 6th dan black belt

Judo achievements and titles
- Olympic Games: (bronze) (2008)
- World Champ.: (silver) (2007)
- Pan American Champ.: (gold) (2004, 2005)
Medal record
Women's judo
Representing United States
Olympic Games
Bronze medal – third place	2008 Beijing	‍–‍70 kg
World Championships
Silver medal – second place	2007 Rio de Janeiro	‍–‍70 kg
Pan American Games
Gold medal – first place	2007 Rio de Janeiro	‍–‍70 kg
Pan American Championships
Gold medal – first place	2004 Isla Margarita	‍–‍63 kg
Gold medal – first place	2005 Caguas (PUR)	‍–‍63 kg
Silver medal – second place	2006 Buenos Aires	‍–‍63 kg
Bronze medal – third place	2007 Montreal	‍–‍70 kg
World Juniors Championships
Gold medal – first place	2004 Budapest	‍–‍63 kg
Bronze medal – third place	2006 Santo Domingo	‍–‍63 kg

Profile at external judo databases
- IJF: 2589
- JudoInside.com: 19130
- Professional wrestling career
- Ring name: Ronda Rousey
- Billed height: 5 ft 6 in (168 cm)
- Billed from: Venice, California, U.S.
- Trained by: Brian Kendrick; Goldust; Kurt Angle; Natalya Neidhart; WWE Performance Center
- Debut: April 8, 2018

Ronda Jean Rousey (/ˈraʊzi/ ROW-zee; born February 1, 1987) is an American actress, retired professional wrestler, former judoka, and former mixed martial artist. She is best known for her tenures in the Ultimate Fighting Championship (UFC) and WWE.

She was the first American woman to win an Olympic medal in judo by winning bronze at the 2008 Summer Olympics. (Note: Lynn Roethke had previously won a silver medal in the 1988 Olympics, but her medal was not counted toward the US medal count due to Women's Judo being a demonstration sport.) Rousey began her mixed martial arts (MMA) career with King of the Cage in 2011. She soon joined Strikeforce, becoming their last Women's Bantamweight Champion, holding the championship until Strikeforce was acquired by the UFC. Rousey was the first female fighter signed by the UFC and part of the promotion's first women's bout at UFC 157; she was also its inaugural Women's Bantamweight Champion, later becoming the first woman to appear in the UFC pound-for-pound rankings, and held the record for most UFC title defenses by a female (6) until it was surpassed by Valentina Shevchenko in 2022. Rousey retired from MMA in 2016 and was the first female fighter inducted into the UFC Hall of Fame in 2018.

Rousey began a career in professional wrestling in 2018, signing with WWE, and debuted at WrestleMania 34. She won the Raw Women's Championship at that year's SummerSlam, and headlined Evolution, which was WWE's first all-women's pay-per-view. There, Rousey defended the title. Rousey lost the title in the first women's WrestleMania main event at WrestleMania 35. Rousey returned at the 2022 Royal Rumble, winning the women's Royal Rumble match. That year, she would win the SmackDown Women's Championship twice, making her an overall three-time women's world champion in WWE. She became the eighth Women's Triple Crown Champion when she won the WWE Women's Tag Team Championship with Shayna Baszler. Rousey and Baszler also unified the WWE and NXT Women's Tag Team Championships. After leaving WWE in October 2023, she began wrestling on the independent circuit.

Rousey is the only woman to become a champion in both the UFC and WWE as well as the only woman to headline a pay-per-view event in both companies. She was voted the best female athlete of all time in a 2015 ESPN fan poll, and Fox Sports described her as "one of the defining athletes of the 21st century." Rousey has also appeared in films, including The Expendables 3 (2014), Furious 7 (2015), and Mile 22 (2018), and published her autobiography, My Fight / Your Fight, in 2015.

== Early life ==
Ronda Jean Rousey was born in Riverside, California, on February 1, 1987, the youngest of three daughters of AnnMaria De Mars (née Waddell) and Ronald John Rousey, after whom she was named. Her mother, a decorated judoka, was the first American to win a World Judo Championship (in 1984, as AnnMaria Burns). Her father worked for a manufacturing company, was a member of the Society for the Advancement of Material and Process Engineering, and prior to his death had been awarded a patent for a police protective shield. Rousey is of English, Polish, Venezuelan, Trinidadian, and Canadian ancestry. One of her maternal great-grandfathers, Alfred Waddell, was a Trinidadian doctor who immigrated to Canada and became one of the first black physicians in North America, while a maternal great-grandmother was born in Caracas, Venezuela. Her stepfather is an aerospace engineer. When Rousey was eight years old, her biological father, who had broken his back while sledding with his kids, died by suicide. AnnMaria pursued a PhD in educational psychology at the University of California, Riverside as her daughters grew up.

For the first six years of her life, Rousey struggled with speech and could not form an intelligible sentence due to apraxia, a neurological childhood speech sound disorder. This speech disorder was attributed to being born with her umbilical cord wrapped around her neck. When Rousey was three years old, her mother and father moved from Riverside, California, to Jamestown, North Dakota, to obtain intensive speech therapy with specialists at Minot State University. Rousey dropped out of high school and later earned her GED. She was raised between Jamestown and Southern California, retiring from her judo career at 21 and starting her MMA career at 22 when she realized that she did not want to spend her life in a conventional field of work.

== Olympic judo career ==
Rousey began judo with her mother at the age of 11. Rousey trained with her mother until she was 13, when she accidentally broke her mother's wrist. At 17, Rousey was the youngest judoka to qualify for the 2004 Olympic Games in Athens. Rousey lost in her first match to eventual silver medalist Claudia Heill in the 63 kg bracket. Also that year, Rousey won a gold medal at the 2004 World Judo Juniors Championships in Budapest, Hungary.

In April 2006, she became the first female U.S. judoka in nearly 10 years to win an A-Level tournament as she went 5–0 to claim gold at the Birmingham World Cup in Great Britain. Later that year, the 19-year-old won the bronze medal at the 2006 Junior World Championships, becoming the first U.S. athlete to win two Junior World medals.

In February 2007, Rousey moved up to 70 kg where she ranked as one of the top three women in the world. She won the gold medal at the 2007 Pan American Games and the silver medal at the 2007 World Judo Championships.

In August 2008, Rousey competed at the 2008 Olympic Games in Beijing, China. She lost her quarterfinal to the Dutch ex-world champion Edith Bosch but qualified for a bronze medal match through the repechage bracket. Rousey defeated Annett Boehm by Yuko to win a bronze medal (Judo offers two bronze medals per weight class). With the victory, Rousey became the first American to win an Olympic medal in women's judo since its inception as an Olympic sport in 1992. Rousey ultimately compiled a competition judo record of 56 wins and 19 losses.

Rousey retired from judo at 21 after the Olympics. After winning her Olympic medal, Rousey shared a studio apartment with a roommate in Venice Beach, California and worked three jobs as a bartender and cocktail waitress to support herself and her dog.

== Mixed martial arts career ==
=== Training ===
When Rousey started learning judo, her mother took her to judo clubs run by her old teammates. Rousey went to North Hollywood, Los Angeles Hayastan MMA Academy, which was run by Armenian-American Gokor Chivichyan, where she trained with fellow future MMA fighters Manny Gamburyan and Karo Parisyan. According to Rousey, Hayastan practiced "a more brawling style of judo versus the more technical Japanese style." Rousey trained mostly with males bigger than she was and often got frustrated and cried when she got thrown and could not throw somebody. "Probably from 2002 to 2005 I cried every single night of training," Rousey remarked.

Rousey trained closely with Gamburyan. After Rousey injured her knee when she was 16, Gamburyan volunteered to open the gym every afternoon and work with her personally. Back in 2004, her teammates thought Rousey "would kill these girls" in MMA, but also thought she was "too pretty to get hit in the face" and should keep doing judo. While Gamburyan and Parisyan went into MMA, Rousey stuck with judo but remained in touch with MMA through them. The first MMA fight she took an interest in watching was Manny Gamburyan versus Nate Diaz in The Ultimate Fighter finale. Rousey stated she never got as excited watching judo or any other sport. After the 2008 Olympics the following year, she decided to start MMA through Team Hayastan.

Rousey also trained at the Glendale Fighting Club, to which she was introduced by Gamburyan and other Hayastan teammates. She started training under her long-term MMA coach Edmond Tarverdyan at Glendale Fighting Club.

She trained in Jiu Jitsu at Dynamix MMA with Henry Akins from 2011 to 2014 and went on to train with Ryron Gracie and Rener Gracie of Gracie Academy, as well as B.J. Penn of Art of Jiu-Jitsu. In wrestling, Rousey trained under the Romanian American Leo Frîncu.

=== Early career (2010–2011) ===
Rousey made her mixed martial arts debut as an amateur on August 6, 2010. She defeated Hayden Munoz by submission due to an armbar in 23 seconds.

She entered the quarterfinals of the Tuff-N-Uff 145 lbs women's tournament on November 12, 2010, and submitted promotional veteran Autumn Richardson with an armbar in 57 seconds.

Rousey faced Taylor Stratford in the Tuff-N-Uff tournament semi-finals on January 7, 2011, and won by technical submission due to an armbar in 24 seconds. She then announced plans to turn pro and was replaced in the tournament. Rousey has a 3–0 record in amateur MMA competition, and the combined duration of all her amateur fights is under 2 minutes.

Rousey made her professional mixed martial arts debut on March 27, 2011, at King of the Cage: Turning Point. She submitted Ediane Gomes with an armbar in 25 seconds.

Rousey faced kickboxing champion Charmaine Tweet in an MMA bout at Hard Knocks Fighting Championship: School of Hard Knocks 12 on June 17, 2011, in Calgary, Canada. She submitted Tweet with an armbar in 49 seconds.

=== Strikeforce (2011–2012) ===
==== Early success ====
Rousey was scheduled to make her Strikeforce debut against Sarah D'Alelio on July 30, 2011, at Strikeforce: Fedor vs. Henderson in Hoffman Estates, Illinois. The fight was postponed and eventually took place on the Strikeforce Challengers 18 main card on August 12, 2011, in Las Vegas, Nevada. Rousey defeated D'Alelio by technical submission due to an armbar early in the first round. The victory was controversial. Rousey claimed that D'Alelio yelled "tap" more than once and that D'Alelio denied this and claimed to have yelled "Aaaahhh". According to the unified rules of mixed martial arts, either one of these utterances would still be a verbal submission.

Rousey faced Julia Budd at Strikeforce Challengers 20 on November 18, 2011, in Las Vegas. She won via submission due to an armbar in the first round, dislocating Budd's elbow in the process. Following the fight, she announced plans to move down to 135 pounds to challenge Miesha Tate, the Strikeforce Women's Bantamweight Champion at the time, with whom she had developed a much-publicized rivalry.

During his appearance on The Joe Rogan Experience, Rousey's trainer Edmond Tarverdyan said that Rousey started her MMA career in the 145 lb division because she had to be able to make weight at short notice, due to the difficulty of finding willing opponents.

==== Women's Bantamweight Champion ====
Rousey challenged Tate for her Strikeforce title on March 3, 2012, in Columbus, Ohio. She defeated Tate by submission due to an armbar in the first round, again dislocating her opponent's elbow, to become the new Strikeforce Women's Bantamweight Champion.

Rousey appeared in All Access: Ronda Rousey on Showtime. The half-hour special debuted on August 8, 2012. UFC President Dana White revealed during the program that "In the next 10 years, if there's a woman in the octagon, it's probably going to be Ronda Rousey." The second installment of the special aired on August 15, 2012. Rousey also appeared on Conan.

Rousey defended her strikeforce title against Sarah Kaufman at Strikeforce: Rousey vs. Kaufman on August 18, 2012, in San Diego, California. Rousey said that she would throw Kaufman's arm at her corner after ripping it off with an armbar, and threatened to choke or pound Kaufman's face to death. During the fight, Rousey quickly took Kaufman down and submitted her with an armbar in 54 seconds to retain the Strikeforce Women's Bantamweight Championship. After the fight, Rousey announced that if former Strikeforce Women's Featherweight Champion Cris Cyborg wanted to fight her, it would have to take place at bantamweight.

=== Ultimate Fighting Championship (2012–2016) ===
==== First female UFC Champion ====
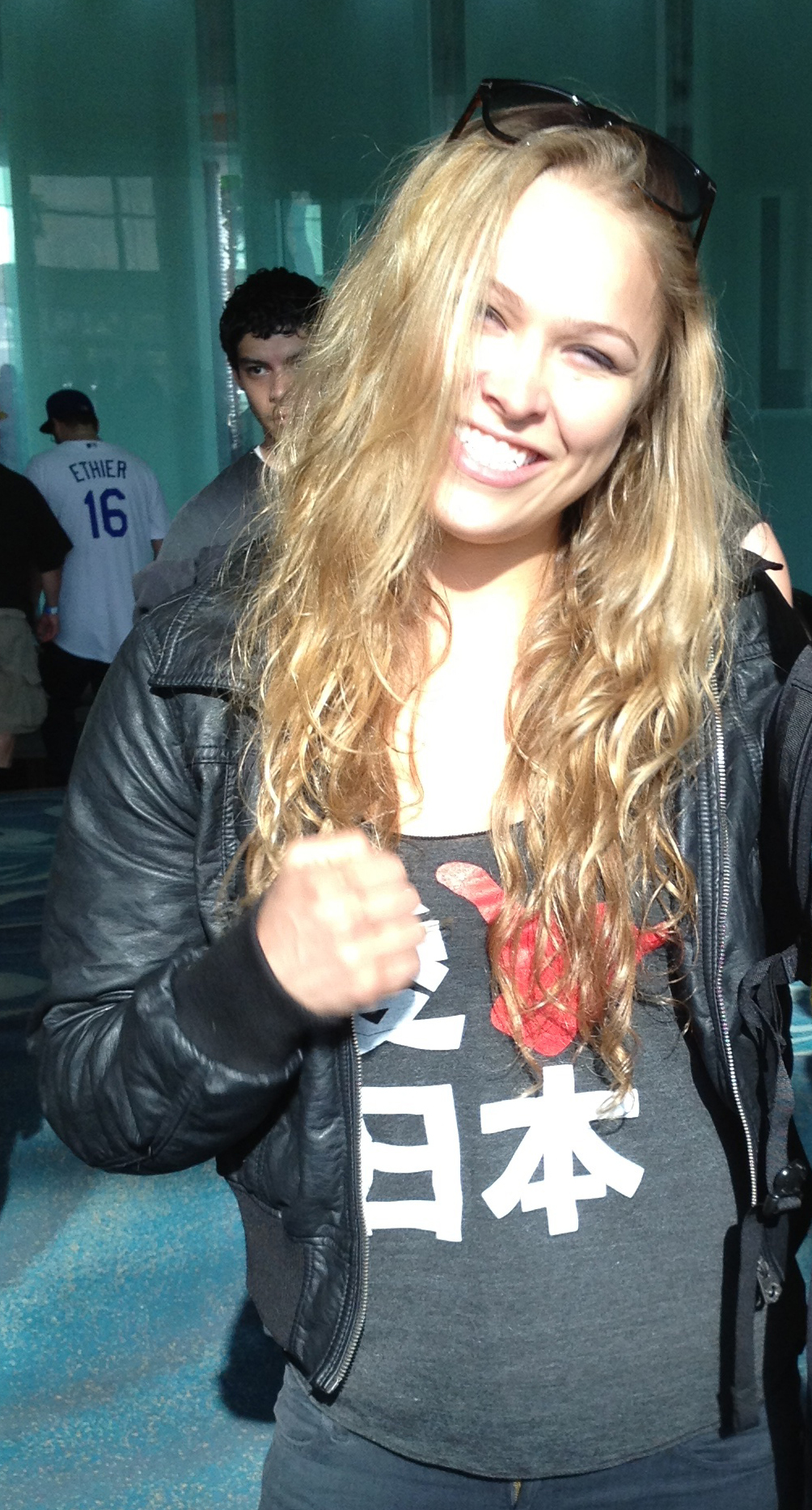
Rousey in 2012

In November 2012, the Ultimate Fighting Championship announced that Rousey had become the first female fighter to sign with the UFC. UFC President Dana White officially announced at the UFC on Fox: Henderson vs. Diaz pre-fight press conference that Rousey was the first UFC Women's Bantamweight Champion.

Rousey originally opposed using the nickname her friends gave her, "Rowdy", feeling it would be disrespectful to professional wrestler "Rowdy" Roddy Piper. After meeting Piper (circa 2012 or 2013) through Gene LeBell, who helped train both of them, Piper personally gave his approval.

Rousey defended her title against Liz Carmouche on February 23, 2013, at UFC 157. Despite being caught in an early standing neck crank attempt from Carmouche, Rousey went on to successfully defend her Bantamweight Championship title, winning the fight at 4:49 into the first round by submission due to an armbar. Carmouche dislocated Ronda Rousey's jaw during the fight.

Rousey faced Miesha Tate, in a rematch from Strikeforce, at UFC 168 on December 28, 2013. After going past the first two rounds, with Tate surviving an armbar attempt and a triangle attempt, Rousey finally submitted Tate via armbar in the third round to retain her Bantamweight Championship. In an interview with Los Angeles Daily News, Rousey said she had lost muscle during her film commitments and not been able to regain her full strength for the Tate fight.

==== Record-setting championship reign ====
Rousey defended her UFC Women's Bantamweight Championship against fellow Olympic medalist and undefeated fighter Sara McMann in the main event at UFC 170 on February 22, 2014. Rousey won the fight by TKO after knocking down McMann with a knee to the body just over a minute into the first round. This marked Rousey's first career win via a method other than armbar. The stoppage led to controversy, with some sports writers and attendants finding it premature.

In 2014, Rousey was named one of espnW's Impact 25.

Rousey defended the UFC Women's Bantamweight Championship against Alexis Davis in the co-main event at UFC 175 on July 5, 2014. She won the fight via knockout 16 seconds into the first round. Rousey broke her thumb during the fight. The emphatic win also earned Rousey her second Performance of the Night bonus award.

A match between Rousey and Cat Zingano was scheduled to take place at UFC 182 for the women's bantamweight title. However, the fight was moved to February 28, 2015, at UFC 184. Rousey defeated Zingano with an armbar in 14 seconds, the shortest title match in the history of UFC until Conor McGregor defeated José Aldo in 13 seconds 11 months later.

Rousey fought Bethe Correia on August 1, 2015, in Brazil, at UFC 190, winning the bout by knockout 34 seconds into the first round. Rousey dedicated the match to "Rowdy" Roddy Piper, who died the day before, commenting that Piper was one of her inspirations and had endorsed her use of his nickname. This fight earned her another Performance of the Night award.

The bout was Rousey's sixth with the UFC, all of which had been victories. She spent 1077 seconds in the octagon to attain all six and accumulated $1,080,000 in prize money; this equated to nearly $1002.79 for every second spent fighting. Her average time of 2 minutes and 59 seconds was less than the average time of a single match in every UFC weight class, the fastest of which was the Heavyweight division with a time of 7 minutes and 59 seconds.

==== Title loss and subsequent retirement ====
In her seventh title defense, Rousey faced Holly Holm in the main event at UFC 193 on November 15, 2015. Despite being a heavy betting favorite, Rousey was out struck by Holm for most of the bout, and was knocked out with a kick to the neck in round two, losing her title and undefeated streak in the process. After the fight, Rousey and Holm were each awarded a Fight of the Night bonus of $50,000. She was also medically suspended by UFC on November 18, 2015. She was medically cleared on December 9, 2015. The loss to Holm impacted Rousey significantly. Upon her return to the United States after the fight, she hid her face from the paparazzi with a purple pillow. In a February 16, 2016, appearance on The Ellen DeGeneres Show, Rousey stated that she considered suicide in the immediate aftermath of her head kick KO defeat to Holm.

After over a year away from the sport, Rousey returned to face champion Amanda Nunes on December 30, 2016, in the main event at UFC 207. Rousey lost the fight via TKO early in round one.

Although she did not formally announce her retirement, when asked if she would fight MMA again by Ellen DeGeneres in 2018, Rousey replied, "I think it's just as likely as me going back to another Olympics for judo." She was inducted into the UFC Hall of Fame in July 2018.

=== Return against Gina Carano and second retirement ===
On February 17, 2026, it was announced that Rousey would make a one-off return to MMA under Most Valuable Promotions at MVP MMA 1 on Netflix, against Gina Carano on May 16, 2026, at the Intuit Dome in Inglewood, California. Rousey secured the victory via an armbar submission 17 seconds into the first round. After the bout, Rousey once again declared that she was retired from MMA to focus on her family.

== Mixed martial arts fighting style ==
While some fighters strike an impassive pose … Rousey is nothing if not expressive. She smiles often, squinting so tightly that her eyes disappear. She cries easily, a girlhood habit she never outgrew. And before each fight, she glares at her opponent as if she were getting ready to put a permanent end to a lifelong feud. After the fight, she is all smiles again, and usually unblemished.

— The New Yorker, 2014

In a 2012 interview before her first match with Miesha Tate, Rousey said: "When I was doing judo my main advantage was my conditioning and my pace; I used to wear people out." She had taken to heart a quote from Ryoko Tani to fight every five seconds as if it was the last five seconds of the match.

A decorated judoka, Rousey typically grounds an opponent with hip throws and sweeps, then seeks to finish with strikes or submissions. From top position, she usually attacks with punches from side control; in rear position, she often secures a back mount and attacks with head strikes. Rousey is right-handed, but is a left-handed judoka fighting in an orthodox stance as a striker.

Rousey's favorite MMA fighter is Fedor Emelianenko, whose fighting style she works to emulate.

Rousey is well known for her skill in grappling and is particularly noted for her string of victories by armbar. Against accomplished strikers, such as Julia Budd and Sarah Kaufman, Rousey has typically brought the fight down and sought a quick submission. Only powerful grapplers, such as Miesha Tate and Liz Carmouche, have been competitive with Rousey on the ground.

Rousey is notable for being a fast finisher, with 12 of her 13 professional wins coming by way of first-round finish. She has never had a professional fight go to a decision. She holds the record for the sixth-shortest average fight time in the UFC, and the shortest average fight time of any woman. She also holds the record for the fastest submission in modern UFC history, a 14-second armbar in her title fight against Cat Zingano.

During early fights in her MMA career, Rousey mainly used striking to set up judo. She became a more proficient striker following her UFC debut, leading to her first wins by way of stoppage. While standing, Rousey normally uses jabs, knees, and overhand rights. She seldom stood side on with a set boxing stance, but would square up to the opponent, while still generating strong striking power, especially when near the fence, or clinching opponents with the left hand to close the distance.

While discussing her signature armbar in an interview, Rousey noted that her judoka mother jumped on her every morning to wake her up with armbars.

Rousey is notable for introducing trash talking to women's MMA. In many interviews Rousey has used harsh language and openly downplayed the abilities of her opponents, which she explains as a way to generate more publicity for the sport.

== Professional wrestling career ==
=== The Four Horsewomen ===
Rousey is a professional wrestling fan. She, Shayna Baszler, Jessamyn Duke, and Marina Shafir dubbed themselves "The Four Horsewomen", a play on The Four Horsemen professional wrestling stable, with the blessing of members Ric Flair and Arn Anderson. The Four Horsewomen were acknowledged on camera and commentary as such, in the front row at WWE's SummerSlam event on August 17, 2014. The group also went backstage during the event, meeting Paul Heyman, among others. Rousey was interviewed by WWE.com that night; when asked if she, like Brock Lesnar, would cross over to wrestling, she replied: "You never know".

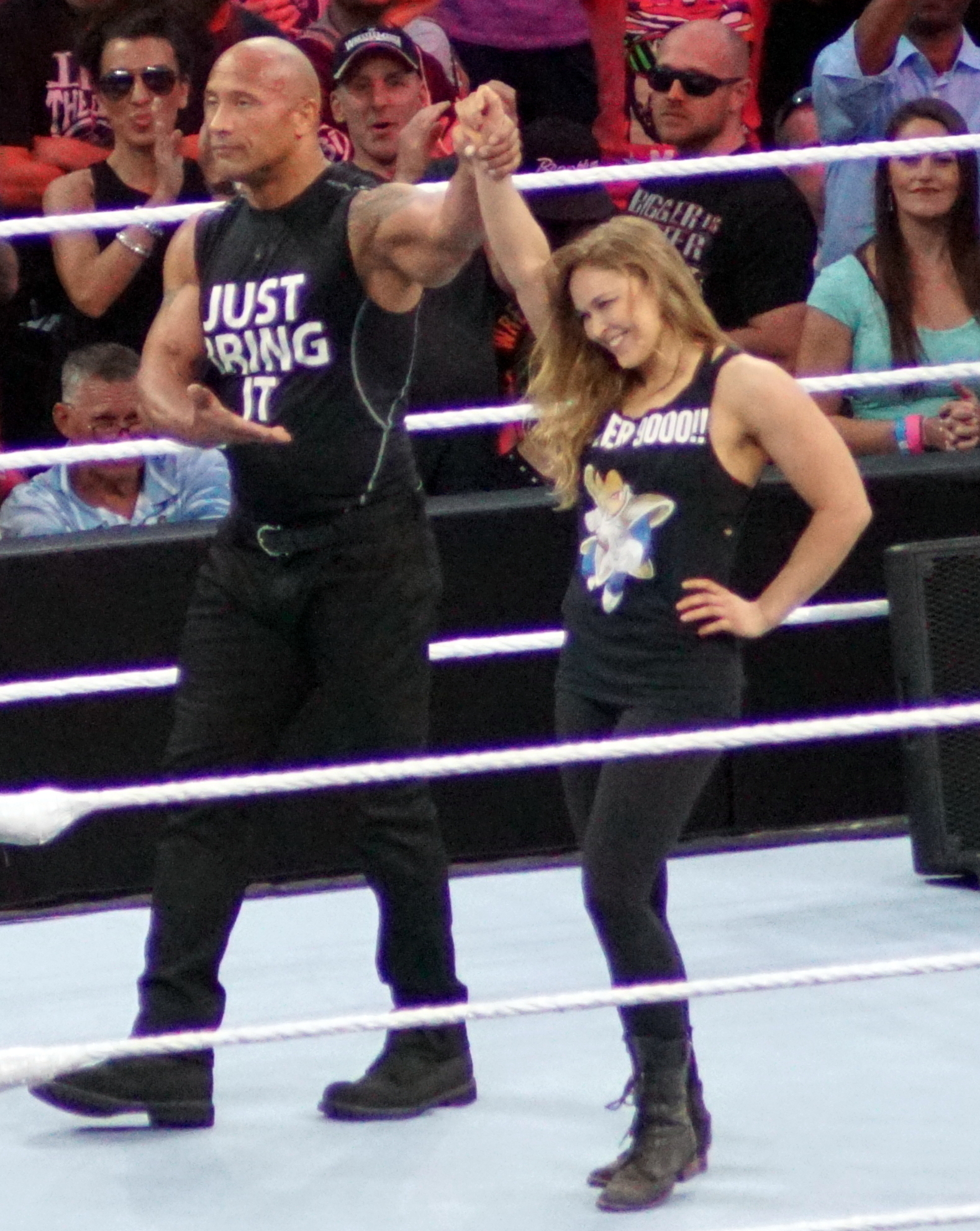
Rousey with The Rock at WrestleMania 31

At WrestleMania 31 on March 29, 2015, the Four Horsewomen were seated in the front row. During an in-ring argument between The Rock and The Authority (Stephanie McMahon and Triple H), McMahon slapped The Rock and ordered him to leave "her ring". She taunted him, saying he would not hit a woman. He left, paused and walked over to Rousey to a loud ovation. He then helped her into the ring and said that she would be happy to hit McMahon for him. After a staredown, The Rock attacked Triple H. When he stumbled toward Rousey, she tossed him out of the ring. McMahon tried to slap her, was blocked and Rousey grabbed her arm, teasing an armbar, before throwing her out of the ring. Rousey and The Rock celebrated in the ring, while The Authority retreated with the implication of revenge. The segment was replayed and discussed throughout the next night's Raw with the commentators hyping a tweet Rousey made earlier that day, in which she implied a return to WWE with "We're just gettin' started...".

On July 13, 14, and September 12, 2017, the Four Horsewomen appeared in the audience of the Mae Young Classic to support their compatriot Shayna Baszler, who was making her WWE debut in the tournament. Additionally, during the event, all four Horsewomen had a face-off with Charlotte Flair, Becky Lynch, and Bayley, who, in WWE together with Sasha Banks, were also known as the Four Horsewomen, hinting at a possible future feud between the two groups.

=== WWE (2017–2023) ===
==== Training and debut (2017–2018) ====
In September 2017, it was reported that Rousey had signed with WWE on a full-time basis and had been training at the WWE Performance Center in Orlando, Florida. She also trained under Brian Kendrick at his wrestling school.

Rousey made a surprise appearance at the Royal Rumble on January 28, 2018, confronting Raw Women's Champion Alexa Bliss, SmackDown Women's Champion Charlotte Flair, and Asuka, who had just won the inaugural women's Royal Rumble match. ESPN immediately revealed during the segment that she had signed a full-time contract with WWE. The jacket which Rousey wore during this appearance belonged to "Rowdy" Roddy Piper, given to her by his son. On February 25 at the Elimination Chamber pay-per-view, Rousey was involved in an in-ring altercation with Triple H and Stephanie McMahon, after which she signed her WWE contract (in storyline), thus making her a part of the Raw brand.

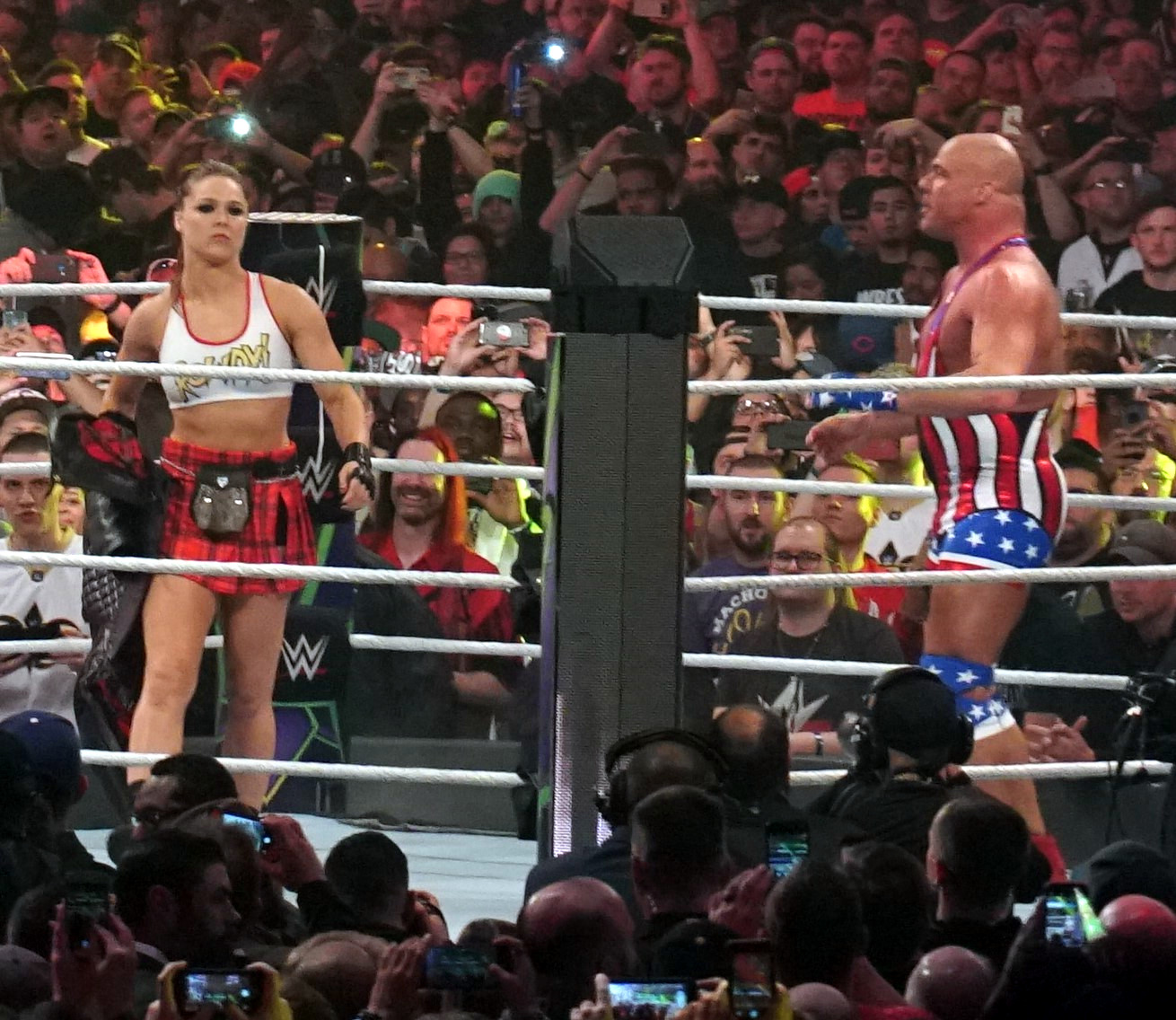
Rousey at WrestleMania 34 in April 2018 with Kurt Angle (also her WWE debut match)

Rousey made her in-ring debut at WrestleMania 34, WWE's flagship event, in a mixed tag team match pitting Rousey and Kurt Angle against Stephanie McMahon and Triple H. At WrestleMania on April 8, Rousey submitted McMahon with her trademark armbar submission hold to secure the win for her team. Her debut performance was widely praised by both fans and wrestling critics, with wrestling veteran Jim Cornette calling it the greatest debut ever. The Washington Post noted the positive fan reaction, stating "The match exceeded expectations, with fans firmly behind Rousey" and "[fans were] surprised [at her] high-level coordination and quality of wrestling. Even those who were not agreed the match was entertaining".

==== Raw Women's Champion and hiatus (2018–2022) ====
In May, she was challenged by then-champion Nia Jax, setting up Rousey's shot at the Raw Women's Championship at the Money in the Bank pay-per-view. At the event on June 17, Rousey won the match by disqualification after interference by Alexa Bliss, who attacked both Rousey and Jax and cashed in her Money in the Bank contract (which she won earlier that night) to win the title instead. For her first singles match and title opportunity, she was once again praised by fans and critics for her performance, with CNET stating "For the first time, [WWE's] biggest mainstream star is a woman". They believed that despite "worry was that the match would expose Rousey's own inexperience, which would greatly damage her aura and star power", she "came across as a formidable, believable star wrestler. The match was good, but she was awesome". Throughout the next two months, Rousey would start her first feud in WWE with Alexa Bliss over the title, which included a suspension (again in kayfabe) after Rousey attacked Bliss, Angle, and multiple officials. After honoring her suspension from in-ring competition, Rousey received a Raw Women's Championship match by Raw general manager Kurt Angle against Bliss at SummerSlam. At the event on August 19, Rousey squashed Bliss to win the title, her first championship win in WWE. In doing so she became the first woman to be a world champion in both MMA and professional wrestling. In a rematch between the two that took place a month later on September 16 at Hell in a Cell, Rousey once again submitted Bliss to retain the title.

Throughout her championship reign, Rousey went on to fend off title contenders such as Nikki Bella (in the main event of the first all women's pay-per-view Evolution on October 28), Mickie James, Nia Jax, Natalya, and Sasha Banks. Rousey was supposed to face Becky Lynch at the Survivor Series pay-per-view in an interbrand champion vs. champion match, but Lynch was legitimately injured during an invasion angle just minutes after she attacked Rousey backstage. At the event on November 18, Rousey faced Charlotte Flair instead, and won via disqualification after Flair attacked her with a kendo stick and steel chairs. A month later, at TLC: Tables, Ladders & Chairs on December 16, Rousey gained revenge against both Flair and Lynch as she pushed them off a ladder during their match, also helping Asuka win the SmackDown Women's Championship. Shortly after she retained her title against Bayley on the January 28, 2019, episode of Raw, Rousey continued her feud with Becky Lynch (who had won the Royal Rumble match) after the latter chose to challenge her in a title match at WrestleMania 35. On the February 11 episode of Raw, Vince McMahon suspended Lynch for 60 days in storyline and announced Charlotte Flair replaced Lynch as Rousey's WrestleMania opponent. On the March 4 episode of Raw, Rousey turned heel when she attacked both Flair and Lynch. At Fastlane on March 10, Lynch faced Flair in a match where if Lynch won, she would be inserted back into the Raw Women's Championship match at WrestleMania. Rousey attacked Lynch during the match, giving Lynch the disqualification victory and thus a WrestleMania triple threat match between Rousey, Flair, and Lynch was made official. On March 25, WWE announced Rousey's title defense against Lynch and Flair would be the main event of WrestleMania 35, making it the first women's match to close WrestleMania. At the event on April 7, in what was changed to a Winner Takes All match for Rousey's Raw and Flair's SmackDown Women's Championships, Lynch controversially pinned Rousey to win both titles. The commentary and production team commented that Rousey was in the ring saying her shoulders were not down for the full three-count and showed a replay of the ending pin-pointing this fact. Nonetheless, this gave Rousey her first loss in WWE and ended her championship reign at 231 days; it would remain the longest reign as Raw Women's Champion until Lynch's own would surpass Rousey's. Following, WrestleMania 35, Rousey went on hiatus to heal a broken hand.

==== SmackDown Women's Champion; storyline with Shayna Baszler (2022–2023) ====
On January 29, 2022, at the Royal Rumble, Rousey returned to WWE as a face, entering at No. 28 in the Women's Royal Rumble match and eliminating Brie Bella, Nikki A.S.H, and Shotzi. She won by last eliminating Charlotte Flair, thus earning a championship match at WrestleMania 38. On the February 4 episode of SmackDown (her first appearance on the SmackDown brand), Rousey chose to challenge Flair for the SmackDown Women's Championship at WrestleMania 38. At Elimination Chamber on February 19, Rousey and Naomi defeated Flair and Sonya Deville. Rousey's rift with Flair continued over the next few weeks, and on the first night of WrestleMania 38 on April 2, Flair defeated Rousey to retain the title, ending Rousey's undefeated singles streak and giving Rousey her second loss. On the following SmackDown, Rousey challenged Flair to an "I Quit" match, which she declined. However, the match was subsequently granted and scheduled for WrestleMania Backlash on May 8, where Rousey defeated Flair to win the title.

On the May 13, 2022 episode of SmackDown, she retained her title against Raquel Rodriguez in an open challenge. At Money in the Bank on July 2, Rousey retained her title against Natalya, but after the match, Liv Morgan successfully cashed in her Money in the Bank contract on Rousey, ending her reign at 55 days. Rousey then challenged Morgan for the title at SummerSlam 2022. At the event on July 30, Rousey lost to Morgan in controversial fashion, with Morgan winning by pinfall despite submitting to Rousey's armbar while her shoulders were down. After the match, Rousey attacked Morgan and the referee. As a result of attacking the referee, Rousey was (kayfabe) suspended from WWE. After her suspension was lifted, Rousey won a fatal five-way elimination match on the September 9 episode of SmackDown to earn a rematch against Morgan for the SmackDown Women's Championship at Extreme Rules. The following week, Morgan challenged Rousey to an Extreme Rules match for the title, which Rousey accepted. At the event on October 8, Rousey defeated Morgan to win her second SmackDown Women's Championship.

On the October 28, 2022 episode of SmackDown, Rousey retained her title against the returning Emma in an open challenge. At Survivor Series: WarGames on November 26, Rousey retained her title against Shotzi with help from Shayna Baszler. On the December 30 episode of SmackDown, Rousey retained her title against Raquel Rodriguez. After the match, Rousey was confronted by the returning Charlotte Flair, who challenged Rousey to an impromptu title match, which she accepted. Rousey ended up losing the title to Flair in under a minute, ending her second reign at 83 days.

After a brief hiatus, Rousey returned on the February 10, 2023 episode of SmackDown to help Shayna Baszler attack Liv Morgan and Tegan Nox, officially beginning an alliance between the two. On Night 2 of WrestleMania 39, Rousey and Baszler won the women's WrestleMania Showcase fatal four-way tag team match despite Rousey barely being involved in the match due to a fractured elbow. As part of the 2023 WWE Draft, Rousey and Baszler were drafted to the Raw brand as a team. On the May 29 episode of Raw, Rousey and Baszler won a fatal four-way tag team match for the vacant WWE Women's Tag Team Championship; Rousey also became the eighth WWE Women's Triple Crown Champion in the process. On the June 23 episode of SmackDown, Rousey and Baszler defeated Alba Fyre and Isla Dawn to unify the WWE and NXT Women's Tag Team Championships, with the latter retired in the process. At Money in the Bank, Rousey and Baszler lost the tag team title to Liv Morgan and Raquel Rodriguez when Baszler turned on her, ending their reign at 32 days. Rousey lost to Baszler at SummerSlam in an MMA Rules match by technical submission, a match that was panned by fans.

Following her match at SummerSlam, it was reported that Rousey was leaving WWE. This was confirmed on October 28 when she was moved to the alumni section of WWE.com. Just prior on her Instagram on October 11, Rousey said she had retired. During the promotion of her first autobiography, Rousey criticized her time in WWE and Vince McMahon. She also pointed that she retired due to the number of concussions she had sustained during her time as an MMA fighter.

=== Independent circuit (2023) ===
After leaving WWE, Rousey wrestled two matches on the independent circuit in Los Angeles in 2023. Teaming with her friend Marina Shafir, she defeated Brian Kendrick and Taya Valkyrie at a Lucha VaVoom event on October 27, 2023, and wrestled Athena and Billie Starkz to a no contest on November 16 in the main event of The Wrestling Revolver's "Unreal 2023" pay-per-view.

=== Ring of Honor / All Elite Wrestling (2023, 2026) ===
On November 23, 2023, Rousey and Marina Shafir debuted in Ring of Honor (ROH), defeating Athena and Billie Starkz in a tag team match that aired on ROH Honor Club TV. After her ROH appearance, Rousey stated that she was not interested in a full-time return but did not rule out an occasional match.

On March 15, 2026, Rousey made her debut for ROH's sister promotion All Elite Wrestling (AEW) at the Revolution pay-per-view, where she confronted "Timeless" Toni Storm who had just defeated Shafir.

== Other ventures ==
=== Magazine appearances ===
Rousey appeared nude on the cover of ESPN The Magazine's 2012 Body Issue and in a pictorial therein. In May 2013, Rousey was ranked 29 on the Maxim Hot 100. She also appeared on the cover and in a pictorial of the September 2013 issue.

In 2015, Rousey became the first woman featured on the cover of Australian Men's Fitness, appearing on their November edition.

Rousey was on the cover of the January 2016 issue for The Ring magazine. She became the first mixed martial artist to ever appear on the cover of the boxing magazine and the second woman as well, after Cathy Davis in 1978. In February 2016, she appeared in body paint as one of three cover athletes on the cover of the Sports Illustrated Swimsuit Issue.

=== Films and television ===
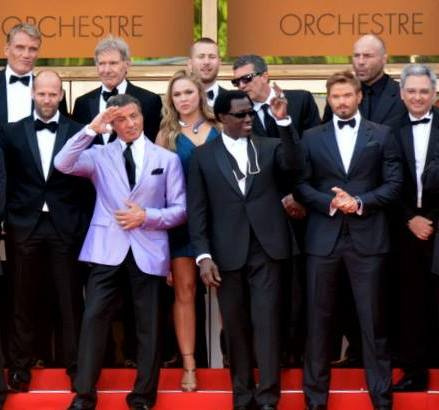
Rousey (center, middle row) alongside other actors at the 2014 Cannes Film Festival

Rousey co-starred in The Expendables 3 (2014), marking her first role in a major motion picture. In 2015, she appeared in the film Furious 7, and played herself in the film Entourage.

In October 2015, Rousey became the first female athlete to guest host ESPN's SportsCenter.

Rousey hosted the January 23, 2016, episode of the late-night variety show Saturday Night Live.

Rousey appeared in the Season 2, Episode 20 episode of Blindspot playing the role of Devon Penberthy, a prison inmate serving time for transporting weapons across state lines.

A number of starring film roles have been developed for Rousey, including an adaptation of her autobiography, My Fight / Your Fight, at Paramount, The Athena Project at Warner Bros., the Peter Berg-directed action film Mile 22. Rousey was scheduled to star in a remake of the 1989 Patrick Swayze action drama Road House. Road House would have marked her biggest acting job to date. According to Variety, Rousey reached out to Swayze's widow, Lisa Niemi, to ask for her blessing, which Niemi gave. However, the Road House project was cancelled in 2016.

On August 18, 2019, it was revealed that Rousey is appearing as a recurring character Lena Bosko in the third season of Fox's 9-1-1 series. During her first day of shooting, she injured two fingers after her left hand was jammed in a boat door. The tip of her ring finger was fractured while her middle finger was broken with the tendon nearly severed. Rousey was rushed to the hospital, where her middle finger was mended with a metal plate and screws.

In September 2021, Rousey hosted Rowdy's Places on ESPN+. This ten-episode limited series saw Ronda speak with experts within the worlds of MMA, wrestling, boxing and more to uncover why combat sports have been a global sensation for a millennium.

=== Video games ===
On July 9, 2018, Rousey was confirmed as one of the two pre-order bonus characters for the video game WWE 2K19 (the other being wrestling veteran Rey Mysterio). She previously appeared in EA Sports UFC, EA Sports UFC 2 and EA Sports UFC 3. She later appeared in WWE 2K20, WWE 2K Battlegrounds, WWE 2K22 as a downloadable character, WWE 2K23 and WWE 2K24. Rousey has also appeared in the EA Sports UFC, WWE SuperCard, WWE Champions and WWE Mayhem mobile games as a playable character.

On January 17, 2019, it was confirmed that Rousey would be voicing Sonya Blade in the video game Mortal Kombat 11. On February 18, 2020, Rousey announced her first stream on Facebook Gaming and donated all stream profits to charity. On November 30, 2022, Rousey was added as a playable character to the game Raid: Shadow Legends.

== Graphic novels ==
Inspired by her need to travel while recovering from an injury she sustained during WrestleMania, Rousey wrote the graphic novel Expecting the Unexpected. It was published in October 2025 by AWA Studios, with art by Mike Deodato.

== Personal life ==
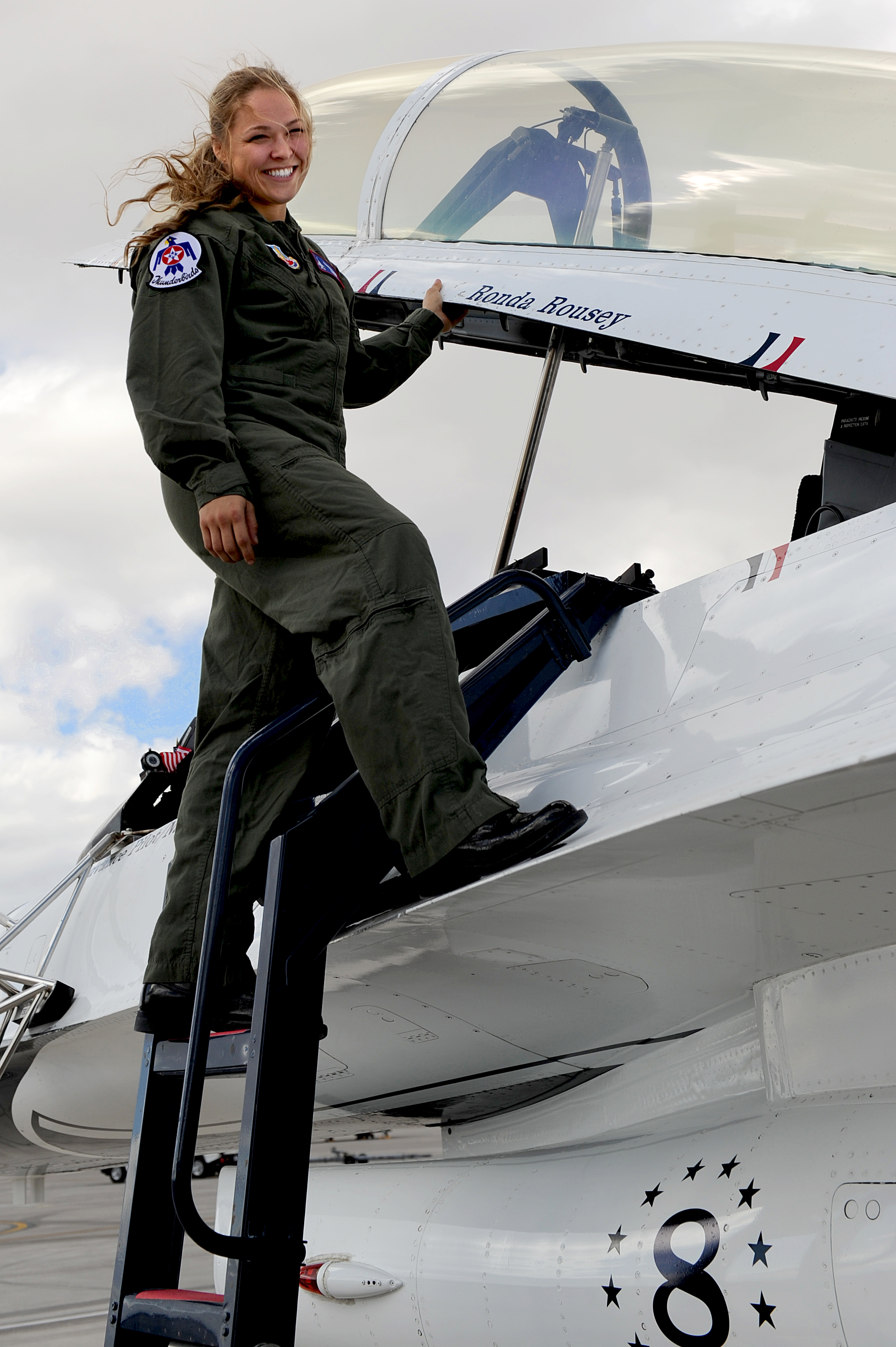
Rousey posing with a United States Air Force Thunderbirds plane with her name on it in November 2012

As of 2023, Rousey lives in Venice, California.

Rousey became a vegan after Beijing 2008, but in 2012 described her diet as "kind of a mix between a Paleo and a Warrior diet."

Rousey has discussed how she struggled with her body image in the past. She explained,

When I was in school, martial arts made you a dork, and I became self-conscious that I was too masculine. I was a 16-year-old girl with ringworm and cauliflower ears. People made fun of my arms and called me "Miss Man". It wasn't until I got older that I realized: these people are idiots. I'm fabulous.

In January 2013, Rousey posted a video to her Twitter page advocating a conspiracy theory surrounding the Sandy Hook Elementary School shooting, which had occurred the month prior, stating in her caption that the video was "extremely interesting" and a "must-watch". After receiving criticism from the general public, Rousey deleted the video and posted another tweet saying that "asking questions and doing research is more patriotic than blindly accepting what you're told." Rousey's manager later issued a public apology for Rousey's posts surrounding the shooting. Rousey issued an apology in 2024.

In 2015, Rousey raised money by auctioning signed T-shirts for the Black Jaguar-White Tiger Foundation.

In April 2015, Rousey visited Yerevan, Armenia, for the 100th anniversary of the Armenian genocide. While in Yerevan, she visited the Tsitsernakaberd Armenian Genocide memorial.

Rousey endorsed Bernie Sanders' presidential campaign in the 2016 United States presidential election.

=== Relationships ===
Rousey once dated fellow UFC fighter Brendan Schaub. In August 2015, Rousey was rumored to be in a relationship with UFC fighter Travis Browne, who knocked out Schaub in a bout the previous year, after a picture of the two together appeared on Twitter and Browne's estranged wife Jenna Renee Webb accused the two of seeing one another. Browne was at the time still married and under investigation by the UFC after Webb publicly accused him of domestic violence in July 2015. Browne confirmed he and Rousey were together in October 2015. The next day, Rousey revealed that she was dating Browne. Rousey and Browne got engaged on April 20, 2017, in New Zealand and married on August 28, 2017, in Browne's home state of Hawaii. Rousey and Browne have two children together.

In her autobiography, My Fight / Your Fight, Rousey wrote of an incident with a former boyfriend she dubbed "Snappers McCreepy" after she discovered that he had taken nude photos of her without her consent or knowledge, two weeks before her first fight with Miesha Tate. When a seething Rousey met him, she "slapped him across the face so hard [her] hand hurt". According to Rousey, he then refused to let her leave as he was trying to explain, so she attacked his face with two punches, one more slap, one knee, then "tossed him aside on the kitchen floor". She went to her car and he followed, grabbing the steering wheel, so she "dragged him out onto the sidewalk, and left him writhing there". Rousey deleted the photos and erased his hard drive, but fear that the pictures may still be out there influenced her to pose for ESPN magazine's Body Issue so that nude pictures of her would be seen on her own terms. Rousey faced backlash from some critics like sports journalist Nancy Armour who thought she had committed domestic abuse.

== Filmography ==
=== Film ===
Year	Title	Role	Notes
2014	The Expendables 3	Luna	
2015	Furious 7	Kara	
2015	Entourage	Herself	
2018	Mile 22	CIA Officer Samantha "Sam" Snow	
2019	Tables	Herself	Short film
2019	Charlie's Angels	Fight Instructor	Cameo
2019	Through My Father's Eyes: The Ronda Rousey Story	Herself	
2023	Steve-O's Bucket List	Herself	Direct-to-video; Guest appearance

=== Video games ===
Year	Title	Voice role	Notes	Ref.
2019	Mortal Kombat 11	Sonya Blade		

=== Television ===
Year	Title	Role	Notes	Episode
2011	Honoo-no Taiiku-kai TV	Herself		
2016	Drunk History	Gallus Mag	Episode: "Scoundrels"	S4 E5
2016	Saturday Night Live	Herself	Host; Episode: Ronda Rousey/Selena Gomez	S41 E11
2017	Blindspot	Devon Penberthy	Episode: "In Words, Drown I"	S2 E20
2019	9-1-1	Lena Bosko	Episodes: "The Searchers", "Triggers", “Rage”, “Malfunction”	S3 E3, S3 E4, S3 E5, S3 E8
2019	Total Divas	Herself		Season 9
2020	Game On!	Herself	Episode: "Celebrity Guests: Demi Lovato and Ronda Rousey"	S1 E2
2023	Stars on Mars	Herself		Season 1

== Championships and accomplishments ==
=== Judo ===
- International Judo Federation
  - 2008 World Cup Senior Gold Medalist
  - 2008 Belgian Ladies Open Senior Bronze Medalist
  - 2007 Jigoro Kano Cup Senior Silver Medalist
  - 2007 Finnish Open Senior Gold Medalist
  - 2007 World Judo Championships Senior Silver Medalist
  - 2007 German Open Senior Bronze Medalist
  - 2007 Pan American Games Senior Gold Medalist
  - 2007 Pan American Championships Senior Bronze Medalist
  - 2007 World Cup Senior Gold Medalist
  - 2007 British Open Senior Gold Medalist
  - 2006 Finnish Open Senior Bronze Medalist
  - 2006 Swedish Open Senior Gold Medalist
  - 2006 World Judo Championships Junior Bronze Medalist
  - 2006 Rendez-Vous Senior Gold Medalist
  - 2006 Pan American Championships Senior Silver Medalist
  - 2006 World Cup Senior Gold Medalist
  - 2006 Belgian Ladies Open Senior Gold Medalist
  - 2005 Ontario Open Senior Gold Medalist
  - 2005 Rendez-Vous Senior Gold Medalist
  - 2005 Pan American Championships Senior Gold Medalist
  - 2004 Ontario Open Senior Gold Medalist
  - 2004 Ontario Open Junior Gold Medalist
  - 2004 World Judo Championships Junior Gold Medalist
  - 2004 Rendez-Vous Senior Bronze Medalist
  - 2004 Pan American Championships Senior Gold Medalist
  - 2003 Rendez-Vous Senior Gold Medalist
  - 2001 Coupe Canada Senior Cup Gold Medalist
- Summer Olympic Games
  - 2008 Summer Olympics Senior Bronze Medalist
- USA Judo
  - USA Senior National Championship (2004, 2005, 2006, 2007, 2008, 2010)
  - USA Senior Olympic Team Trials Winner (2004, 2008)
  - 2007 US Open Senior Gold Medalist
  - 2006 US Open Senior Gold Medalist
  - 2006 USA Fall Classic Senior Gold Medalist
  - 2006 US Open Junior Gold Medalist
  - 2005 US Open Senior Gold Medalist
  - 2005 US Open Junior Silver Medalist
  - 2004 US Open Senior Bronze Medalist
  - 2003 US Open Senior Silver Medalist
  - 2003 USA Fall Classic Senior Gold Medalist
  - 2002 US Open Junior Gold Medalist

=== Other accomplishments ===
- International Sports Hall of Fame (Class of 2018)
- Martial Arts History Museum Hall of Fame (Class of 2018)
- Business Insider Most Dominant Athlete Alive (2015)

=== Mixed martial arts ===
- Ultimate Fighting Championship
  - UFC Hall of Fame (Modern Wing, Class of 2018)
    - First female inductee
  - UFC Women's Bantamweight Championship (One time, inaugural)
    - Six successful title defenses
      - Most consecutive title defenses in UFC Women's Bantamweight division history (6)
        - Second most title defenses in UFC Women's history (6)
        - Second most title fight wins in UFC Women's Bantamweight division history (6)
      - Most finishes in UFC Women's Bantamweight division title fights (6)
        - Longest title fight finish streak in UFC history (6)
        - Second fastest finish in a title fight in UFC history (0:14 vs Cat Zingano)
        - Fastest finish in a UFC Women's Bantamweight division title fight (0:14 vs Cat Zingano)
      - Fastest women's title fight victory in UFC history (0:14 vs Cat Zingano)
      - Tied (Amanda Nunes) for most knockouts in UFC Women's Bantamweight division title fights (3)
        - Third fastest knockout in a UFC title fight (0:16 vs Alexis Davis)
        - Fastest knockout in a UFC Women's Bantamweight division title fight (0:16 vs Alexis Davis)
      - Most submissions in UFC Women's Bantamweight division title fights (3)
        - Fastest submission in a UFC title fight (0:14 vs Cat Zingano)
        - Fastest submission in a UFC Bantamweight division history title fight (0:14 vs Cat Zingano)
        - Tied (B.J. Penn, Matt Hughes & Khabib Nurmagomedov) for third most submissions in UFC title fights (3)
      - Second shortest time for three consecutive title defenses in UFC history (189 days) (behind Alex Pereira)
    - First female UFC Champion
    - First Olympic medalist to win a UFC championship
  - Fight of the Night (Twice) vs. Miesha Tate and Holly Holm
  - Submission of the Night (One time) vs. Miesha Tate
  - Performance of the Night (Four times) vs. Cat Zingano, Sara McMann, Alexis Davis and Bethe Correia
    - Tied (Mackenzie Dern) for second most Post-Fight bonuses in UFC Women's history (7) (behind Jéssica Andrade)
    - Most Post-Fight bonuses in UFC Women's Bantamweight division history (7)
  - Fastest finish in UFC Women's Bantamweight division history (0:14 vs Cat Zingano)
    - Second fastest finish in UFC Women's Bantamweight division history (0:16 vs Alexis Davis)
    - Fifth fastest finish in UFC Women's Bantamweight division history (0:34 vs Bethe Correia)
  - Fastest knockout in UFC Bantamweight division history (0:16 vs Alexis Davis)
  - Tied (Kayla Harrison) for second most submissions in UFC Women's Bantamweight division history (3) (behind Beatriz Mesquita)
    - Fastest submission in UFC Bantamweight division history (0:14 vs Cat Zingano)
  - Most armbar finishes in UFC/WEC/Pride/Strikeforce history (9)
  - Most consecutive armbar finishes in UFC/WEC/Pride/Strikeforce history (6)
  - Won the first ever women's fight in UFC history
  - Shortest average fight time in UFC Women's Bantamweight division history (3:06)
  - Second most finishes in UFC Women's Bantamweight division history (6)
  - Second longest win streak in UFC Women's Bantamweight division history (6)
  - Highest number of knockdowns per fifteen minutes in UFC Women's Bantamweight division history (1.21)
  - Highest number of submissions per fifteen minutes in UFC Women's Bantamweight division history (3.03)
  - UFC.com Awards
    - 2013: Import of the Year, Half-Year Awards: Best Newcomer of the 1HY, Ranked #4 Submission of the Year vs. Liz Carmouche & Ranked #9 Fight of the Year vs. Miesha Tate 2
    - 2014: Ranked #2 Fighter of the Year & Half-Year Awards: Best Fighter of the 1HY
    - 2015: Submission of the Year vs. Cat Zingano
- Strikeforce
  - Strikeforce Women's Bantamweight Championship (One time; last)
    - One successful title defense
  - 2× Female Submission of the Year (2011, 2012)
- BJPenn.com
  - 2010s #3 Ranked Fighter of the Decade
- ESPN
  - 2× Best Female Athlete ESPY Award (2014, 2015)
  - Best Fighter ESPY Award (2015)
  - First Mixed Martial Artist to win an ESPY Award
  - Submission of the Year (2012, vs. Miesha Tate at Strikeforce: Tate vs. Rousey)
- MMA Junkie
  - 2014 #3 Ranked Fighter of the Year
  - 2015 Submission of the Year vs. Cat Zingano at UFC 184
  - 2015 February Submission of the Month vs. Cat Zingano
  - 2015 August Knockout of the Month vs. Bethe Correia
  - 2010s #7 Ranked Fighter of the Decade
- World MMA Awards
  - 3× Female Fighter of the Year (2012, 2013, 2014)
  - 2015 Submission of the Year vs. Cat Zingano at UFC 184
- Wrestling Observer Newsletter awards
  - 2× Best Box Office Draw (2014, 2015)
  - 2× Mixed Martial Arts Most Valuable (2014, 2015)
  - Most Outstanding Fighter of the Year (2014)
- Black Belt magazine
  - 2012 MMA Fighter of the Year
  - 2013 MMA Fighter of the Year
- Bleacher Report
  - 2012 #3 Ranked Fighter of the Year
  - 2013 Female Fighter of the Year
  - 2014 #4 Ranked Fighter of the Year
- MMA Fighting
  - 2012 Fighter of the Year
  - 2012 Submission of the Year vs. Miesha Tate at Strikeforce: Tate vs. Rousey
- Fight Matrix
  - 2011 Female Rookie of the Year
  - 2012 Female Fighter of the Year
  - 2013 Female Fighter of the Year
  - 2014 Female Fighter of the Year
- Inside MMA
  - 2011 Female Fighter of the Year Bazzie Award
  - 2012 Female Fighter of the Year Bazzie Award
  - 2013 Female Fighter of the Year Bazzie Award
  - 2014 Female Fighter of the Year Bazzie Award
- Combat Press
  - 2015 Submission of the Year vs. Cat Zingano at UFC 184
- Yahoo Sports
  - 2013 Female Fighter of the Year
  - 2013 Breakthrough Fighter of the Year
  - 2014 #2 Ranked Fighter of the Year
- Bloody Elbow
  - 2013 Submission of the Year vs. Miesha Tate 2 at UFC 168
- FIGHT! Magazine
  - 2012 Breakout Fighter of the Year

=== Professional wrestling ===
- CBS Sports
  - Rookie of the Year (2018)
- Pro Wrestling Illustrated
  - Ranked No. 1 of the top 100 female singles wrestlers in the PWI Women's 100 in 2018
  - Rookie of the Year (2018)
  - Ranked No. 3 of the top 100 female singles wrestlers in the PWI Women's 100 in 2019
- Sports Illustrated
  - Ranked No. 4 of the top 10 women's wrestlers in 2018
- Wrestling Observer Newsletter awards
  - Rookie of the Year (2018)
  - Most Overrated (2022)
- WWE
  - WWE SmackDown Women's Championship (2 times)
  - WWE Raw Women's Championship (1 time)
  - WWE Women's Tag Team Championship (1 time) – with Shayna Baszler
  - Women's Royal Rumble (2022)
  - Eighth Women's Triple Crown Champion
  - Slammy Award (1 time)
    - "This is Awesome" Moment of the Year (2015) – with The Rock
  - WWE Year-End Award
    - Best Diss of the Year (2018)

== Mixed martial arts record ==
Professional record breakdown
15 matches	13 wins	2 losses
By knockout	3	2
By submission	10	0

Res.	Record	Opponent	Method	Event	Date	Round	Time	Location	Notes
Win	13–2	Gina Carano	Submission (armbar)	MVP MMA: Rousey vs. Carano	May 16, 2026	1	0:17	Inglewood, California, United States	Featherweight bout.
Loss	12–2	Amanda Nunes	TKO (punches)	UFC 207	December 30, 2016	1	0:48	Las Vegas, Nevada, United States	For the UFC Women's Bantamweight Championship.
Loss	12–1	Holly Holm	KO (head kick and punches)	UFC 193	November 15, 2015	2	0:59	Melbourne, Australia	Lost the UFC Women's Bantamweight Championship. Fight of the Night.
Win	12–0	Bethe Correia	KO (punch)	UFC 190	August 1, 2015	1	0:34	Rio de Janeiro, Brazil	Defended the UFC Women's Bantamweight Championship. Performance of the Night.
Win	11–0	Cat Zingano	Submission (straight armbar)	UFC 184	February 28, 2015	1	0:14	Los Angeles, California, United States	Defended the UFC Women's Bantamweight Championship. Performance of the Night. Submission of the Year.
Win	10–0	Alexis Davis	KO (punches)	UFC 175	July 5, 2014	1	0:16	Las Vegas, Nevada, United States	Defended the UFC Women's Bantamweight Championship. Performance of the Night.
Win	9–0	Sara McMann	TKO (knee to the body)	UFC 170	February 22, 2014	1	1:06	Las Vegas, Nevada, United States	Defended the UFC Women's Bantamweight Championship. Performance of the Night.
Win	8–0	Miesha Tate	Submission (armbar)	UFC 168	December 28, 2013	3	0:58	Las Vegas, Nevada, United States	Defended the UFC Women's Bantamweight Championship. Submission of the Night. Fight of the Night.
Win	7–0	Liz Carmouche	Submission (armbar)	UFC 157	February 23, 2013	1	4:49	Anaheim, California, United States	Defended the UFC Women's Bantamweight Championship.
Win	6–0	Sarah Kaufman	Submission (armbar)	Strikeforce: Rousey vs. Kaufman	August 18, 2012	1	0:54	San Diego, California, United States	Defended the Strikeforce Women's Bantamweight Championship; Rousey was promoted to UFC Women's Bantamweight Champion on December 6, 2012.
Win	5–0	Miesha Tate	Technical Submission (armbar)	Strikeforce: Tate vs. Rousey	March 3, 2012	1	4:27	Columbus, Ohio, United States	Bantamweight debut. Won the Strikeforce Women's Bantamweight Championship.
Win	4–0	Julia Budd	Submission (armbar)	Strikeforce Challengers: Britt vs. Sayers	November 18, 2011	1	0:39	Las Vegas, Nevada, United States	
Win	3–0	Sarah D'Alelio	Technical Submission (armbar)	Strikeforce Challengers: Gurgel vs. Duarte	August 12, 2011	1	0:25	Las Vegas, Nevada, United States	
Win	2–0	Charmaine Tweet	Submission (armbar)	Hard Knocks FC: School of Hard Knocks 12	June 17, 2011	1	0:49	Calgary, Alberta, Canada	Catchweight (150 lb) bout.
Win	1–0	Ediane Gomes	Submission (armbar)	KOTC: Turning Point	March 27, 2011	1	0:25	Tarzana, California, United States	Featherweight debut.

Amateur record breakdown		
3 matches	3 wins	0 losses
By submission	3	0

Res.	Record	Opponent	Method	Event	Date	Round	Time	Location	Notes
Win	3–0	Taylor Stratford	Submission (armbar)	Tuff-N-Uff - Las Vegas vs. 10th Planet Riverside	January 7, 2011	1	0:24	Las Vegas, Nevada, United States	
Win	2–0	Autumn Richardson	Submission (armbar)	Tuff-N-Uff - Future Stars of MMA	November 12, 2010	1	0:57	Las Vegas, Nevada, United States	
Win	1–0	Hayden Munoz	Submission (armbar)	CFL - Ground Zero	August 6, 2010	1	0:23	Oxnard, California, United States	

== Pay-per-view bouts ==
No.	Event	Fight	Date	Venue	City	PPV Buys
1.	UFC 157	Rousey vs. Carmouche	February 23, 2013	Honda Center	Anaheim, California, United States	450,000
2.	UFC 170	Rousey vs. McMann	February 22, 2014	Mandalay Bay Events Center	Las Vegas, Nevada, United States	340,000
3.	UFC 184	Rousey vs. Zingano	February 28, 2015	Staples Center	Los Angeles, California, United States	590,000
4.	UFC 190	Rousey vs. Correia	August 1, 2015	HSBC Arena	Rio de Janeiro, Brazil	900,000
5.	UFC 193	Rousey vs. Holm	November 15, 2015	Docklands Stadium	Melbourne, Australia	1,100,000
6.	UFC 207	Nunes vs. Rousey	December 30, 2016	T-Mobile Arena	Las Vegas, Nevada, United States	1,100,000
	Total sales					4,480,000

== Judo Olympic Games record ==
Result	Rec.	Opponent	Score	Event	Division	Date	Location
Win	6–3	(Germany) Annett Böhm	0010–0001	2008 Olympic Games	–70 kg	August 13, 2008	(China) Beijing
Win	5–3	(Hungary) Anett Meszaros	1010–0000	2008 Olympic Games	–70 kg	August 13, 2008	(China) Beijing
Win	4–3	(Algeria) Rachida Ouerdane	1001–0000	2008 Olympic Games	–70 kg	August 13, 2008	(China) Beijing
Loss	3–3	(Netherlands) Edith Bosch	0000–1000	2008 Olympic Games	–70 kg	August 13, 2008	(China) Beijing
Win	3–2	(Poland) Katarzyna Pilocik	1000–0000	2008 Olympic Games	–70 kg	August 13, 2008	(China) Beijing
Win	2–2	(Turkmenistan) Nasiba Surkieva	1010–0000	2008 Olympic Games	–70 kg	August 13, 2008	(China) Beijing
Loss	1–2	(North Korea) Hong Ok-song	0001–0010	2004 Olympic Games	–63 kg	August 17, 2004	(Greece) Athens
Win	1–1	(United Kingdom) Sarah Clark	1000–0001	2004 Olympic Games	–63 kg	August 17, 2004	(Greece) Athens
Loss	0–1	(Austria) Claudia Heill	0000–0010	2004 Olympic Games	–63 kg	August 17, 2004	(Greece) Athens

== See also ==
- Comparison of professional wrestling and mixed martial arts
- List of female mixed martial artists
- List of multi-sport athletes
- List of multi-sport champions
- List of Olympic medalists in judo
- List of Strikeforce alumni
- List of Strikeforce champions
- List of UFC champions

== Bibliography ==
- Rousey, Ronda; with Maria Burns Ortiz (2015). My Fight/Your Fight. New York: Regan Arts. ISBN 978-1-941-39326-0. OCLC 892041615.
- Rousey, Ronda; with Maria Burns Ortiz (2024). Our Fight. New York: Grand Central Publishing. ISBN 978-1-538-75737-6. OCLC 1411309691.

Achievements
Preceded by Miesha Tate	4th and final Strikeforce Women's Bantamweight Champion; March 3, 2012 – December 6, 2012	Vacant Became UFC Champion
New championship	1st UFC Women's Bantamweight Champion; December 6, 2012 – November 15, 2015	Succeeded by Holly Holm
Awards
Preceded by Miesha Tate	World MMA Female Fighter of the Year; 2012, 2013, 2014	Succeeded by Holly Holm
Preceded by Ben Saunders	World MMA Submission of the Year; 2015 vs. Cat Zingano at UFC 184	Succeeded by Nate Diaz
Preceded by Floyd Mayweather Jr.	Best Fighter ESPY Award; 2015	Succeeded by Conor McGregor
