= Michel Rivera =

Dominican boxer

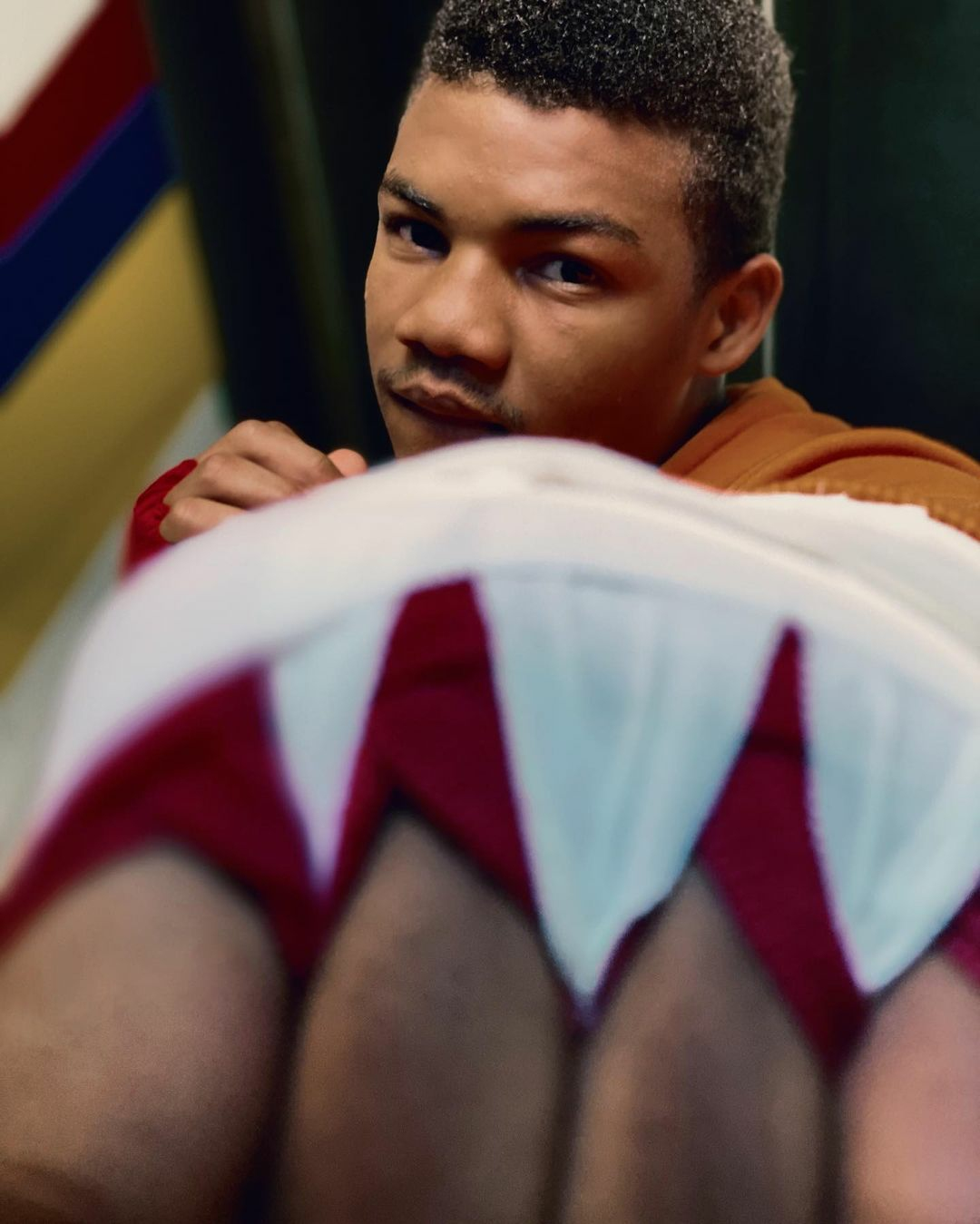

Personal information
- Nickname: La Zarza Ali
- Nationality: Dominican
- Born: Michel Rivera Medina; March 10, 1998 (age 28) Santo Domingo, Dominican Republic
- Height: 5 ft 8 in (173 cm)
- Weight: Lightweight

Boxing career
- Reach: 71 in (180 cm)
- Stance: Orthodox

Boxing record
- Total fights: 28
- Wins: 27
- Win by KO: 14
- Losses: 1

Michel Rivera Medina, commonly known as "La Zarza Ali", is a Dominican professional boxer who held the IBF–USBA lightweight title in 2020.

== Professional career ==
Rivera made his professional debut on 19 March 2016, just 9 days after his 18th birthday, scoring a third-round technical knockout (TKO) victory against Gregory Estevez at the Gimnasio Pedro Cruz in Santiago de los Caballeros, Dominican Republic.

After compiling a record of 15–0 (10 KOs), he made his U.S. debut in June 2019, defeating then-unbeaten René Téllez Girón via eight-round unanimous decision (UD) at the WinnaVegas Casino Resort in Sloan, Iowa.

His next fight came against Jose Luis Gallegos in September. At the pre-fight weigh in, Gallegos failed to weigh inside the 136 lbs weight limit and was subsequently fined $1600 by the California State Athletic Commission (CSAC), with half going to Rivera and the other half to the CSAC. Rivera won the bout via fifth-round TKO after referee Marcos Rosales called a halt to the contest before the commencement of the sixth round. After the fight, Rivera visited Gallegos in his dressing room to return the $800 he gained from the fine.

He next faced Fidel Maldonado Jr for the vacant WBC Continental Americas lightweight title on 1 February 2020, at the Beau Rivage Resort & Casino in Biloxi, Mississippi. After knocking his opponent to the canvas in the tenth round, Rivera followed up with a sustained attack which prompted referee Keith Hughes to call a halt to the contest, handing Rivera his first regional title via tenth-round TKO.

Rivera won his second regional title in his next bout, defeating Ladarius Miller via ten-round UD on 31 October, capturing the vacant IBF–USBA lightweight title at the Alamodome in San Antonio, Texas.

Rivera fought thrice in 2021. In his first fight of the year, on 27 February 2021, Rivera faced Anthony Mercado Raices. He won the fight by a late eight-round knockout. Five months later, on 3 July 2021, Rivera knocked out Jon Fernandez in the eight round of a twelve-round bout. Rivera finished the year with a unanimous decision win against Jose Matias Romero on 30 October 2021.

Rivera defeated Joseph Adorno via ten-round UD on 26 March 2022 at the Minneapolis Armory in Minneapolis, USA.

Michel Rivera suffered the first defeat of his professional career, losing by unanimous decision to Frank Martin on 17 Dec, 2022 at the Cosmopolitan of Las Vegas, Chelsea Ballroom in Las Vegas, USA. Rivera who dressed like his idol Muhammad Ali, was floored in round 7 by Frank Martin en route to the defeat. Rivera rebounded on 25 Nov 2023, defeating former IBF light welterweight champion Sergey Lipinets by unanimous decision.

== Professional boxing record ==
| 28 fights | 27 wins | 1 loss |
|---|---|---|
| By knockout | 14 | 0 |
| By decision | 13 | 1 |

| No. | Result | Record | Opponent | Type | Round, time | Date | Location | Notes |
|---|---|---|---|---|---|---|---|---|
| 28 | Win | 27-1 | Nester Luna Alonso | UD | 10 | Sep 12, 2025 | Dominican Republic | |
| 27 | Win | 26–1 | (Argentina) Hugo Alberto Roldan | SD | 10 | Jul 27, 2024 | (United States) Little Caesars Arena, Detroit, Michigan, U.S. | |
| 26 | Win | 25–1 | (Russia) Sergey Lipinets | UD | 10 | Nov 25, 2023 | (United States) Michelob Ultra Arena, Las Vegas, Nevada, U.S. | |
| 25 | Loss | 24–1 | (United States) Frank Martin | UD | 12 | Dec 17, 2022 | (United States) The Cosmopolitan of Las Vegas, Paradise, Nevada, U.S. | |
| 24 | Win | 24–0 | (United States) Jerry Perez | UD | 8 | Oct 15, 2022 | (United States) Barclays Center, New York City, New York, U.S. | |
| 23 | Win | 23–0 | (United States) Joseph Adorno | UD | 10 | Mar 26, 2022 | (United States) Minneapolis Armory, Minneapolis, U.S | |
| 22 | Win | 22–0 | (Argentina) Jose Matias Romero | UD | 10 | Oct 30, 2021 | (United States) Mandalay Bay Resort & Casino, Paradise, Nevada, U.S. | |
| 21 | Win | 21–0 | (Spain) Jon Fernandez | KO | 8 (12), 0:44 | Jul 3, 2021 | (United States) Dignity Health Sports Park, Carson, California, U.S. | |
| 20 | Win | 20–0 | (Puerto Rico) Anthony Mercado Raices | KO | 8 (8), 2:26 | Feb 27, 2021 | (United States) Shrine Exposition Hall, Los Angeles, California, U.S. | |
| 19 | Win | 19–0 | (United States) Ladarius Miller | UD | 10 | Oct 31, 2020 | (United States) Alamodome, San Antonio, Texas, U.S. | Won vacant IBF–USBA lightweight title |
| 18 | Win | 18–0 | (United States) Fidel Maldonado | TKO | 10 (10), 1:40 | Feb 1, 2020 | (United States) Beau Rivage Resort & Casino, Biloxi, Mississippi, U.S. | Won vacant WBC Continental Americas lightweight title |
| 17 | Win | 17–0 | (United States) Jose Gallegos | KO | 5 (8), 3:00 | Sep 21, 2019 | (United States) Rabobank Theater, Bakersfield, California, U.S. | |
| 16 | Win | 16–0 | (Mexico) Juan Rene Tellez | UD | 8 | Jun 26, 2019 | (United States) WinnaVegas Casino Resort, Sloan, Iowa, U.S. | |
| 15 | Win | 15–0 | (Argentina) Carlos Daniel Cordoba | TKO | 2 (8), 0:19 | Jan 26, 2019 | Radisson Victoria Plaza, Montevideo, Uruguay | |
| 14 | Win | 14–0 | (Cuba) Yankiel León | TKO | 8 (10), 2:04 | Jul 16, 2018 | Hotel Jaragua, Santo Domingo, Dominican Republic | |
| 13 | Win | 13–0 | (Venezuela) Jampier Oses | TKO | 7 (8), 0:29 | Feb 24, 2018 | Club Mauricio Baez, Santo Domingo, Dominican Republic | |
| 12 | Win | 12–0 | (Dominican Republic) Manuel Botis | UD | 8 | Dec 22, 2017 | Los Prados Social Club, Santo Domingo, Dominican Republic | |
| 11 | Win | 11–0 | (Dominican Republic) Luis Ernesto Jose | TKO | 2 (8) | Sep 14, 2017 | Hotel Jaragua, Santo Domingo, Dominican Republic | |
| 10 | Win | 10–0 | (Dominican Republic) Luis Rosa | TKO | 1 (6), 1:17 | Jun 24, 2017 | Hotel Jaragua, Santo Domingo, Dominican Republic | |
| 9 | Win | 9–0 | (Dominican Republic) Marco Acevedo | UD | 10 | May 22, 2017 | Club el Millon, Santo Domingo, Dominican Republic | |
| 8 | Win | 8–0 | (Venezuela) Luis Nino | TKO | 4 (8), 1:12 | Dec 16, 2016 | Maunoloa Night Club y Casino, Santo Domingo, Dominican Republic | |
| 7 | Win | 7–0 | (Dominican Republic) Juan Rafael Polanco | UD | 6 | Sep 23, 2016 | Salon de Eventos P. C. Sambil, Santo Domingo, Dominican Republic | |
| 6 | Win | 6–0 | (Dominican Republic) Juan Carlos Contreras | UD | 4 | Jun 11, 2016 | Coliseo Pedro Julio Nolasco, La Romana, Dominican Republic | |
| 5 | Win | 5–0 | (Dominican Republic) Aneudy Mesa | TKO | 1 (6), 1:35 | May 26, 2016 | Parque del Este, Santo Domingo, Dominican Republic | |
| 4 | Win | 4–0 | (Dominican Republic) Dionisio Rodriguez | TKO | 2 (4), 2:06 | Apr 17, 2016 | Gimnasio Pedro Cruz, Santiago de los Caballeros, Dominican Republic | |
| 3 | Win | 3–0 | (Dominican Republic) Jose Vidal Sanchez | UD | 4 | Apr 9, 2016 | Club Maquiteria, Santo Domingo, Dominican Republic | |
| 2 | Win | 2–0 | (Dominican Republic) Eduardo Juan | TKO | 2 (4), 1:53 | Apr 2, 2016 | Club El Millon, Santo Domingo, Dominican Republic | |
| 1 | Win | 1–0 | (Dominican Republic) Gregory Estevez | TKO | 3 (4), 2:36 | Mar 19, 2016 | Gimnasio Pedro Cruz, Santiago de los Caballeros, Dominican Republic | |
