= Art Hovhannisyan =

Armenian boxer

Personal information
- Nickname: Lionheart
- Nationality: Armenian; American
- Born: Artyom Hovhannisyan; 16 November 1981 (age 44) Gyumri, Armenia
- Height: 5 ft 7 in (1.70 m)
- Weight: Super Featherweight

Boxing career
- Stance: Orthodox

Boxing record
- Total fights: 25
- Wins: 18
- Win by KO: 10
- Losses: 4
- Draws: 3
- No contests: 0

Artyom "Art" Hovhannisyan (Armenian: Արտյոմ Հովհաննիսյան; born 16 November 1981 in Gyumri, Armenia) is a retired Armenian professional boxer. He fought in the super featherweight division.

== Amateur career ==
Hovhannisyan started amateur boxing at the age of 13. He was taught under internationally known boxing coach, Varuzhan Davtyan. He is a four-time Armenian National Champion in the lightweight division.

Art has had much experience in World and European championships and international tournaments. He has fought in: China, Iran, Czechoslovakia, Croatia, France, Ukraine and many other countries. He has had over 175 amateur bouts and lost only 12 of them.

== Professional career ==
Artyom moved to the United States in 2007 and trained at the Glendale Fighting Club under Edmond Tarverdyan.

== Professional boxing record ==
18 Wins (10 knockouts, 8 decisions), 4 Losses (1 knockouts, 3 decisions), 3 Draws
Res.	Record	Opponent	Type	Round	Date	Location	Notes
Win	18-4-3	(Mexico) Francisco Medel	TKO	1(4)	2018-02-16	Sportsmans Lodge, Studio City, United States	
Loss	17-4-3	(United States) Jamel Herring	RTD	3(10)	2017-02-10	Huntington Center, Toledo, Ohio, United States	
Loss	17-3-3	(United States) Diego Magdaleno	UD	10	2016-10-07	Belasco Theater, Los Angeles, California, United States	
Draw	17-2-3	(United States) Fidel Maldonado	D	10	2016-05-20	Fantasy Springs Casino, Indio, California, United States	
Loss	17-2-2	(Peru) Jonathan Maicelo	SD	10	2014-07-11	Little Creek Casino Resort, Shelton, Washington, United States	Loss the WBC International Silver Lightweight Title
Win	17-1-2	(Mexico) Miguel Zuniga	UD	8	2014-04-12	Hollywood Park Casino, Inglewood, California, United States	
Win	16-1-2	(Nigeria) Daniel Attah	TKO	6 (8)	2013-08-16	Chumash Casino, Santa Ynez, California, United States	
Loss	15-1-2	(United States) Alejandro Pérez	UD	10	2013-02-22	Morongo Casino Resort & Spa, Cabazon, California, United States	Loss the WBO NABO Super Featherweight Title
Win	15-0-2	(Venezuela) Miguel Acosta	SD	10	2012-07-20	Chumash Casino, Santa Ynez, California, United States	Acosta down in 1st rd & Hovhannisyan down in rd 5.
Draw	14-0-2	(Mexico) Cristobal Cruz	TD	4 (10)	2011-08-05	Chumash Casino, Santa Ynez, California, United States	Accidental head clash cuts Cruz over right eye.
Win	14-0-1	(United States) Archie Ray Marquez	KO	6 (8)	2011-06-10	Chumash Casino, Santa Ynez, California, United States	Marquez down once in each of rounds one, three and five.
Win	13-0-1	(Mexico) Jose Alfredo Lugo	KO	5 (6)	2011-04-23	Nokia Theater, Los Angeles, California, United States	
Win	12-0-1	(Mexico) Cristian Favela	UD	8	2010-07-17	Agua Caliente Casino, Rancho Mirage, California, United States	
Win	11-0-1	(The Bahamas) Hensley Strachan	TKO	5 (6)	2010-03-06	Agua Caliente Casino, Rancho Mirage, California, United States	Stratchan down in round 1.
Win	10-0-1	(Mexico) Adrian Navarrete	KO	1 (6)	2009-10-22	Commerce Casino, Commerce, California, United States	Count waived.
Win	9-0-1	(Mexico) Baudel Cardenas	KO	5 (6)	2009-09-24	Club Nokia, Los Angeles, California, United States	Count waived; Cardenas down in 4th round; twice in 5th.
Win	8-0-1	(United States) Daniel Gonzalez	TKO	6 (6)	2009-06-12	Civic Auditorium, Glendale, California, United States	Gonzalez down in 3rd round.
Win	7-0-1	(Mexico) Jose Alfredo Lugo	UD	6	2008-09-19	Warner Center Marriott, Woodland Hills, California, United States	
Win	6-0-1	(United States) Ricardo Delgado	UD	6	2008-02-15	Quiet Cannon, Montebello, California, United States	
Win	5-0-1	(United States) Terrance Jett	TKO	4 (4)	2007-12-28	Quiet Cannon, Montebello, California, United States	
Win	4-0-1	(Mexico) Jose Luis Soto Karass	KO	1 (4)	2007-09-28	Quiet Cannon, Montebello, California, United States	
Win	3-0-1	(Mexico) Eric Patrac	UD	4	2007-08-17	Quiet Cannon, Montebello, California, United States	
Draw	2-0-1	(France) Youssef Maach	MD	6	2006-07-12	Serre Chevalier, France	First and second cards were 57-57, third was 58-56 for Hovhannisyan.
Win	2–0	(France) Eric Patrac	UD	4	2006-06-02	Port Marchand, Toulon, Var, France	
Win	1–0	(France) Said Moulkraloua	PTS	4	2006-07-04	Port Marchand, Toulon, Var, France	Professional debut.
