= Nandika D'Souza =

Indian-American materials scientist

Nandika Anne D'Souza is an Indian-American materials scientist whose research interests have included the mechanical properties of composite materials, nanocomposites, polymers, and biopolymers. She is a professor of mechanical engineering in the University of Texas at Dallas Erik Jonsson School of Engineering and Computer Science, where she also serves as associate dean of strategic initiatives.

== Education and career ==
D'Souza studied polymer engineering at the University of Poona in India, graduating in 1988. She came to the US for graduate study in mechanical engineering, receiving a master's degree from Auburn University in 1991 and completing her Ph.D. at Texas A&M University in 1994. Her dissertation, Thermodynamic, Viscoelastic and Rheological Structure-Property Relationships of Poly (vinyl chloride) and Styrenic Copolymer Blends, was supervised by Alan Letton.

She joined the University of North Texas in 1994, becoming a UNT Regents Professor in 2015, and later associate dean for academic affairs, before moving in 2024 to her present position at the University of Texas at Dallas.

== Recognition ==
D'Souza became a Fellow of the Society of Plastics Engineers in 2015 and of the American Society of Mechanical Engineers in 2023.

The Society of Women Engineers named her as a Distinguished Engineering Educator in 2015. The BioEnvironmental Polymer Society gave her their James Hammar Memorial Service Award in 2015. She was the 2022 recipient of the Diversity, Equity, and Inclusion (DEI) Award of the Society for the Advancement of Material and Process Engineering.
