= Edmond Tarverdyan =

Armenian MMA trainer and co-owner of Glendale Fighting Club

- Born: Kirovakan, Armenian Soviet Socialist Republic
- Height: 5 ft 11 in (1.80 m)
- Weight: 155 lb (70 kg; 11 st 1 lb)
- Division: Lightweight
- Style: Boxing, Muay Thai

Mixed martial arts record
- Total: 2
- Wins: 2
- By knockout: 1
- By decision: 1
- Losses: 0

Other information
- Mixed martial arts record from Sherdog

Edmond Tarverdyan is an Armenian mixed martial arts (MMA) trainer who co-owns the Glendale Fighting Club in Glendale, California. He has trained former UFC Bantamweight Champion Ronda Rousey, Travis Browne, Jake Ellenberger, boxer Art Hovhannisyan and Edmen Shahbazyan.

Edmond Tarverdyan's credentials as a professional fight trainer and the quality of his boxing training have often drawn ridicule and mockery from the media and the MMA community. Tarverdyan got into trouble with the California State Athletic Commission about lying about his arrest history leading to his corner licence being revoked. The major criticism being that his fighter's skills appear to stagnate or decline under his coaching methods.

== Career ==
Edmond Tarverdyan began practicing martial arts since he was 16, this resulted in Tarverdyan winning the WBC US Muay Thai title. He mistakenly credits this as the WBC international title because he was originally supposed to fight for that title against Brian Carlos, though a last minute change lead to this fight being scrapped in favor of the WBC USA title fight. After retiring from professional fighting Taverdyan took up teaching MMA.

== Media ==
Tarverdyan was a coach on The Ultimate Fighter: Team Rousey vs. Team Tate.

== Controversy ==
Tarverdyan's corner license was suspended by the CSAC in early 2016 on account of his falsifying his application. Under penalty of perjury, he had indicated ‘No’ to the questions regarding his past criminal offenses. However, in December 2010 he had been arrested on two counts of felony identity theft and one count of misdemeanor resisting arrest according to public records.
