= Fidel Maldonado =

American boxer (born 1991)

Personal information
- Nickname: Atrisco Kid
- Born: July 23, 1991 (age 34) Albuquerque, New Mexico
- Height: 5 ft 9 in (175 cm)
- Weight: Light Welterweight; Lightweight

Boxing career
- Reach: 71 in (180 cm)
- Stance: Southpaw

Boxing record
- Total fights: 34
- Wins: 27
- Win by KO: 19
- Losses: 5
- Draws: 1
- No contests: 1

Fidel Maldonado (born July 23, 1991) is an American professional boxer and the current WBC Youth World lightweight champion.

== Amateur career ==
Maldonado was ranked #2 in the U.S. and had a record of 118–12 during his amateur career. In 2008, Maldonado won the U.S. Future Stars National Championship.

== Professional career ==
He is signed to Oscar De La Hoya's Golden Boy Promotions. He Lost To Fernando Carcamo.
