= Society for the Advancement of Material and Process Engineering =

International professional member society

The Society for the Advancement of Material and Process Engineering (SAMPE) is an international professional member society. SAMPE provides a global forum for information, education, and professional fellowship on materials and processes development.

== History ==
SAMPE was formed by nine aerospace professionals from Southern California who were concerned with the lack of materials and need to economize. They formed a network of material and process engineers to provide a means for information exchange and to prevent the duplication of effort among companies working toward a common goal.

They formed the Society of Aircraft Material and Process Engineers in 1944. It was renamed the Society of Aerospace Material and Process Engineers in the late 1950s as a result of the developing interest in space travel. SAMPE was later renamed the Society for the Advancement of Material and Process Engineering in 1973 to reflect membership growth beyond the aerospace industry.

SAMPE is a global professional member society and provides information on new materials and processing technology either via conferences, exhibitions, technical forums, publications, or books in which professionals in this field can exchange ideas and air their views. As the only technical society encompassing all fields of endeavor in materials and processes, SAMPE provides a unique and valuable forum for scientists, engineers, and academicians.

== Outreach ==
SAMPE sponsors an annual student leadership competition for student engineers. The SAMPE Student Leader Experience Award sends eligible students to the SAMPE International Spring Symposium & Exhibition to network and increase their understanding of the Materials and Processes community.
