= Judo at the 2010 South American Games – Men's 60kg =

Judo competition

The Men's 60 kg event at the 2010 South American Games was held on March 20.

== Medalists ==
Gold	Silver	Bronze
Juan Miguel Acuna; Peru	Jose Ernesto Cano; Ecuador	John Jairo Vargas; Colombia; Javier Guédez; Venezuela

== Results ==
=== Main Bracket ===
First round
Juan Miguel Acuna (PER)	110
Leandro Dario Rivera (BOL)	000^{3}
Javier Guédez (VEN)	001
Ivan Bell (AHO)	000^{2}
Jorge David Peralta (ARG)	000^{2}
Ricardo Ayres (BRA)	101

Quarterfinals
Juan Miguel Acuna (PER)	100
Damian Samudio (PAN)	000H
Javier Guédez (VEN)	000
John Jairo Vargas (COL)	100
Ricardo Ayres (BRA)	100
Lucas Boccia (PAR)	000
Jose Ernesto Cano (ECU)	110
Juan Sebastian Perez (CHI)	000^{1}

Semifinals
Juan Miguel Acuna (PER)	010^{2}
John Jairo Vargas (COL)	001^{3}
Ricardo Ayres (BRA)	010^{1}
Jose Ernesto Cano (ECU)	101^{3}

Final
Juan Miguel Acuna (PER)	110^{1}
Jose Ernesto Cano (ECU)	000^{3}

=== Repechage ===
First round
Leandro Dario Rivera (BOL)	012^{2}
Damian Samudio (PAN)	001^{2}
bye
Javier Guédez (VEN)
Jorge David Peralta (ARG)	100
Lucas Boccia (PAR)	000
Juan Sebastian Perez (CHI)
Bye

Second round
Leandro Dario Rivera (BOL)	000
Javier Guédez (VEN)	100
Jorge David Peralta (ARG)	001^{1}
Juan Sebastian Perez (CHI)	100^{1}

Bronze medal finals
Javier Guédez (VEN)	100^{1}
Ricardo Ayres (BRA)	000^{1}
Juan Sebastian Perez (CHI)	000^{1}
John Jairo Vargas (COL)	102
