= Judo at the 2010 South American Games – Women's 70kg =

The Women's 70 kg event at the 2010 South American Games was held on March 19.

== Medalists ==
| Gold | Silver | Bronze |
|---|---|---|
| Yuri Alvear; Colombia | Vanessa Minda; Ecuador | María Elena Rojas; Venezuela; Glaucia Lima; Brazil |

== Results ==
=== Round Robin ===
| Class | Athlete | Contest | | | Points | | |
| Class | Athlete | Pld | W | L | W | L | Diff |
|---|---|---|---|---|---|---|---|
| 1st place, gold medalist(s) | Yuri Alvear (COL) | 3 | 3 | 0 | 30 | 0 | +30 |
| 2nd place, silver medalist(s) | Vanessa Minda (ECU) | 3 | 2 | 1 | 20 | 10 | +10 |
| 3rd place, bronze medalist(s) | María Elena Rojas (VEN) | 3 | 1 | 2 | 10 | 20 | -10 |
| 3rd place, bronze medalist(s) | Glaucia Lima (BRA) | 3 | 0 | 3 | 0 | 30 | -30 |

=== Contests ===
| 1 | Vanessa Minda (ECU) | 100 - 000 | Glaucia Lima (BRA) |
| 2 | María Elena Rojas (VEN) | 000 - 100 | Yuri Alvear (COL) |
| 3 | Vanessa Minda (ECU) | 100 - 000H | María Elena Rojas (VEN) |
| 4 | Glaucia Lima (BRA) | 000 - 100 | Yuri Alvear (COL) |
| 5 | Vanessa Minda (ECU) | 000 - 100 | Yuri Alvear (COL) |
| 6 | Glaucia Lima (BRA) | 000 - 110 | María Elena Rojas (VEN) |
