= Paris Saint-Germain Judo =

Judo club

Paris Saint-Germain
- Full name: Paris Saint-Germain Judo
- Short name: PSG Judo
- Founded: 1 September 1992
- Arena: Espace Omnisports
- President: Djamel Bouras
- Head coach: Baptiste Leroy
- Website: psg.fr/judo

Paris Saint-Germain Judo, commonly referred to as PSG Judo, is a French professional judo club based in Paris, France. It operates as the judo department of Paris Saint-Germain FC. After existing from 1992 to 2003, under the name PSG Alliance Judo 77, the section was reestablished in 2017. The Espace Omnisports dojo in Le Plessis-Robinson, Hauts-de-Seine, is the club's home ground. It houses the training facilities for professional judokas, as well as the club's youth system, the Paris Saint-Germain Academy Judo.

Founded in September 1992 at the initiative of former judoka Thierry Rey and with financial support from Canal+, owner of PSG, the judo section was the club's first to win a continental trophy. Led by star judokas David Douillet, Cécile Nowak, Djamel Bouras and Frédéric Demontfaucon, the Parisians clinched the Champions League in 1995 and the French 1st Division Championship in 1997. However, PSG judo experienced a sharp decline thereafter, leading Canal+ to withdraw in 2002, before PSG closed the section in June 2003.

Conceived by Bouras, who was part of the original iteration of the section, PSG Judo was officially reestablished on 1 September 2017. Paris Saint-Germain president Nasser Al-Khelaifi announced the project in a press release. He also confirmed the signing of French judoka Teddy Riner as the team's leading figure, while Bouras was appointed president. Initially an all-male project, PSG Judo eventually evolved into a mixed-gender team. Since their return, the PSG men's and women's teams have enjoyed domestic and European success.

In total, PSG Judo have won sixteen trophies, two in the 1990s and fourteen after their resurgence in the late 2010s. The men's team have won four French 1st Division Championships, one Europa League, one Champions League, and one French 2nd Division Championship. Meanwhile, the women's team have claimed four French 1st Division Championships, one Europa League, and one Champions League. Finally, the club have won three more Champions League titles with a mixed team composed of male and female judokas.

== History ==
=== PSG takeover and Champions League title ===
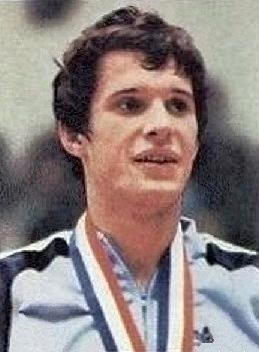
Thierry Rey, the founding father of PSG Judo.

In September 1992, Paris Saint-Germain FC and its owners Canal+ established PSG Alliance Judo 77 by selecting Parisian club Alliance 77 as the foundation for the judo department. Led by Charles Biétry, PSG's multisport project maintained active sections in handball, volleyball, rugby league, boxing, and basketball. The judo project was spearheaded by club president Thierry Rey, a former judoka and 1980 Olympic champion, who later served as a judo advisor at Canal+. PSG inherited the Dojo Léon-Bonnet from Alliance 77, which remained the section's home venue until 1998. By the end of 1992, the women's team had recruited French star Cécile Nowak, joining Laetitia Tignola, Laurence Sionneau, and Karine Petit, while the men's squad featured French internationals Nasser Nechar, Philippe Demarche, Bertrand Amoussou-Guenou, and Philippe Taurines.

PSG's ambitious recruitment drive quickly established the club, alongside Orléans, as one of the leading forces in French judo during its inaugural 1993 season. In February, the club hosted the 22nd edition of the Grand Slam Paris at the Stade Pierre de Coubertin, with nine PSG judokas competing against the world's elite. In October 1993, the club further strengthened its squad by signing France's most promising judoka, David Douillet, from Maisons-Alfort. His impact was immediate, helping PSG secure victory in a friendly tournament the following month.

The 1994 season began with Jean-Pierre Gibert taking over as manager and the addition of several prominent signings, including Christophe Brunet, Raymond Stevens, and Nicolas Gill. The season also marked the retirement of Cécile Nowak, the club's first star. Her final tournament was the French Championship in January, where the women's team finished third, while the men's team lost to Orléans in the final. Despite David Douillet missing the first two rounds, PSG made a strong run in the Champions League, with Douillet returning in the semi-finals against Berlin, where he suffered his first defeat in over two and a half years, resulting in PSG's elimination from the competition.

PSG opened the 1995 season with another disappointment in the French Championship in January. With both teams tied in the final, the men's title slipped away to the capital club in the playoff, when Nechar lost to Laurent Calleja of Orléans. The women's team suffered the same fate, falling to Levallois in the final. PSG turned its season around in November 1995 when the club's men's team was crowned European champion in Germany. After their triumph against hosts Abensberg in the semifinals, the Parisians defeated Ukrainian side Taifun Dnipro in the final, becoming the third French club to win the Champions League after Orléans and Racing. It was also PSG's first international title, across all disciplines.

=== French champions and Bouras affair ===
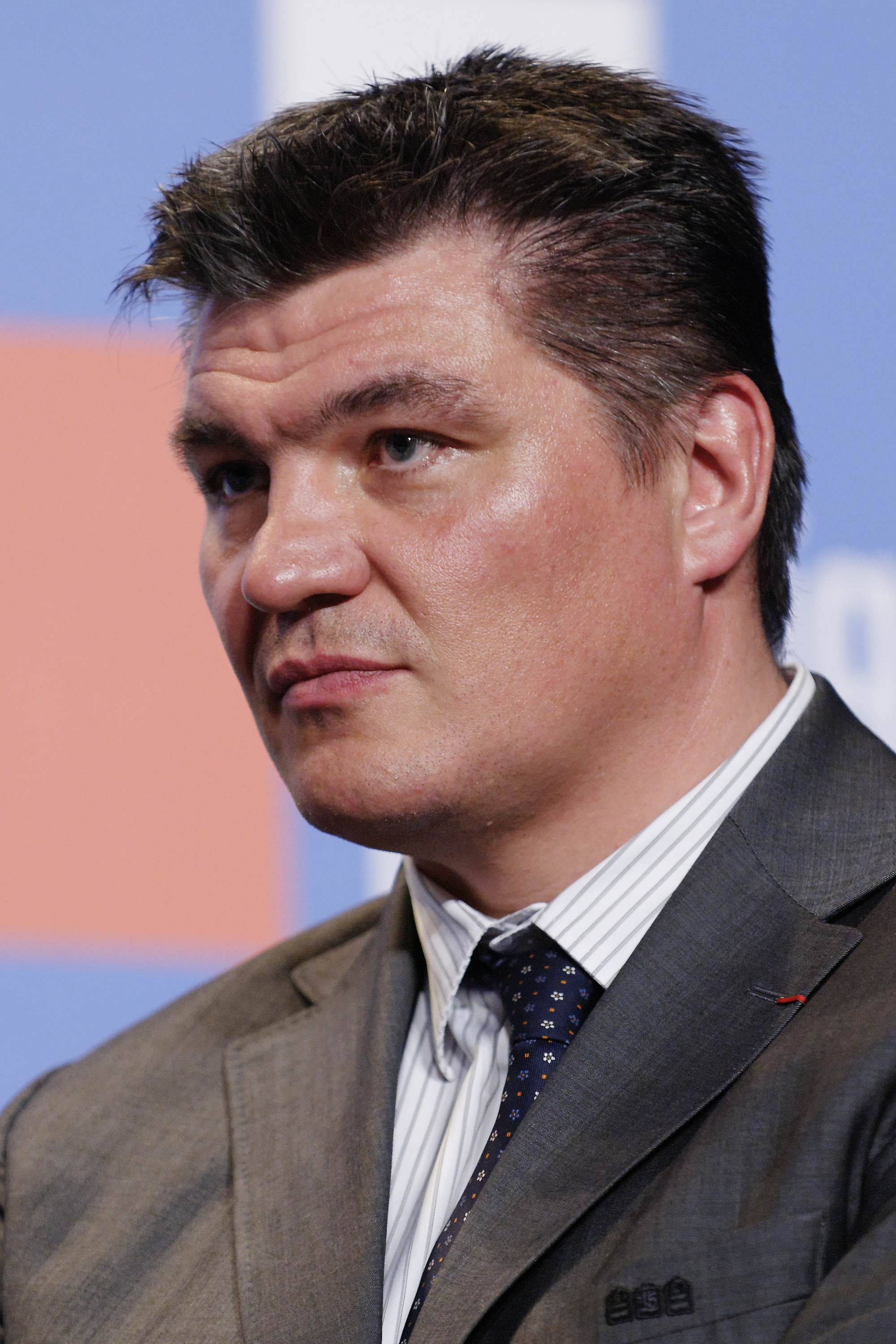
David Douillet was PSG's first big judo star.

After their continental triumph, the 1996 season was difficult. The men's team lost to Racing in the semi-finals of the French Championship in January, while the women's team advanced but lost to Levallois in the final. In October, the club signed French stars Djamel Bouras and Frédéric Demontfaucon. That same month, despite strong results, PSG also announced the liquidation of the women's section. Christine Cicot, who had just joined as Nowak's successor the previous season, left at the end of the year, but it was not until the departure of Petit in November 1999 that the women's team was finally closed. Weakened by the prolonged injury of Douillet, who suffered a serious motorcycle accident, PSG were unable to defend their European title, finishing fourth.

The signings of Bouras, Demontfaucon and British star Jamie Johnson, along with Douillet's return to training in January, seemed to herald a promising 1997 season. However, Bouras tested positive for nandrolone following PSG's victory over Dnipropetrovsk in October, forcing him to be ruled out of the Champions League final and risking a three-year ban. Douillet was also forced to withdraw with discomfort in his left shoulder. Destabilized by these events and without two of their best judokas, the Parisians lost the final against German side Abensberg. With a four-month suspended sentence, Bouras eventually featured in PSG's winning side, defeating AC Boulogne-Billancourt in the French Championship final to secure their first national title.

With Douillet plagued by injuries and Bouras being suspended for two years by the French Judo Federation in April, the 1998 season again proved challenging for the club. Furthermore, Jessy Euclide, one of the club's promising youngsters, was killed in a car accident in May at the age of 23. A minute's silence was observed during PSG's Champions League victory against Romanian side Oradea. Among the good news was a fourth consecutive continental semi-final despite Douillet's absence and the club's new dojo at the Aquaboulevard. In November, the Court of Arbitration for Sport (CAS) allowed Bouras, following an appeal, to participate in the Champions League final four in Germany.

Bouras and PSG, without Douillet still injured, managed to eliminate Abensberg, three-time European champions in the last four seasons, but lost the final to Dutch side Kenamju Haarlem in an unfavorable atmosphere, with the German fans booing Bouras. In the French Championship, Bouras was once again the center of controversy. The club relied heavily on him, as Douillet was sidelined due to injury and new signing Franck Bellard was unavailable. However, Bouras refused to fight, citing angina, and the team finished third. Angered, PSG president Rey threatened to expel him from the club. Demontfaucon was now PSG's great hope after the failed season of Bouras and Douillet.

=== Decline and dissolution ===
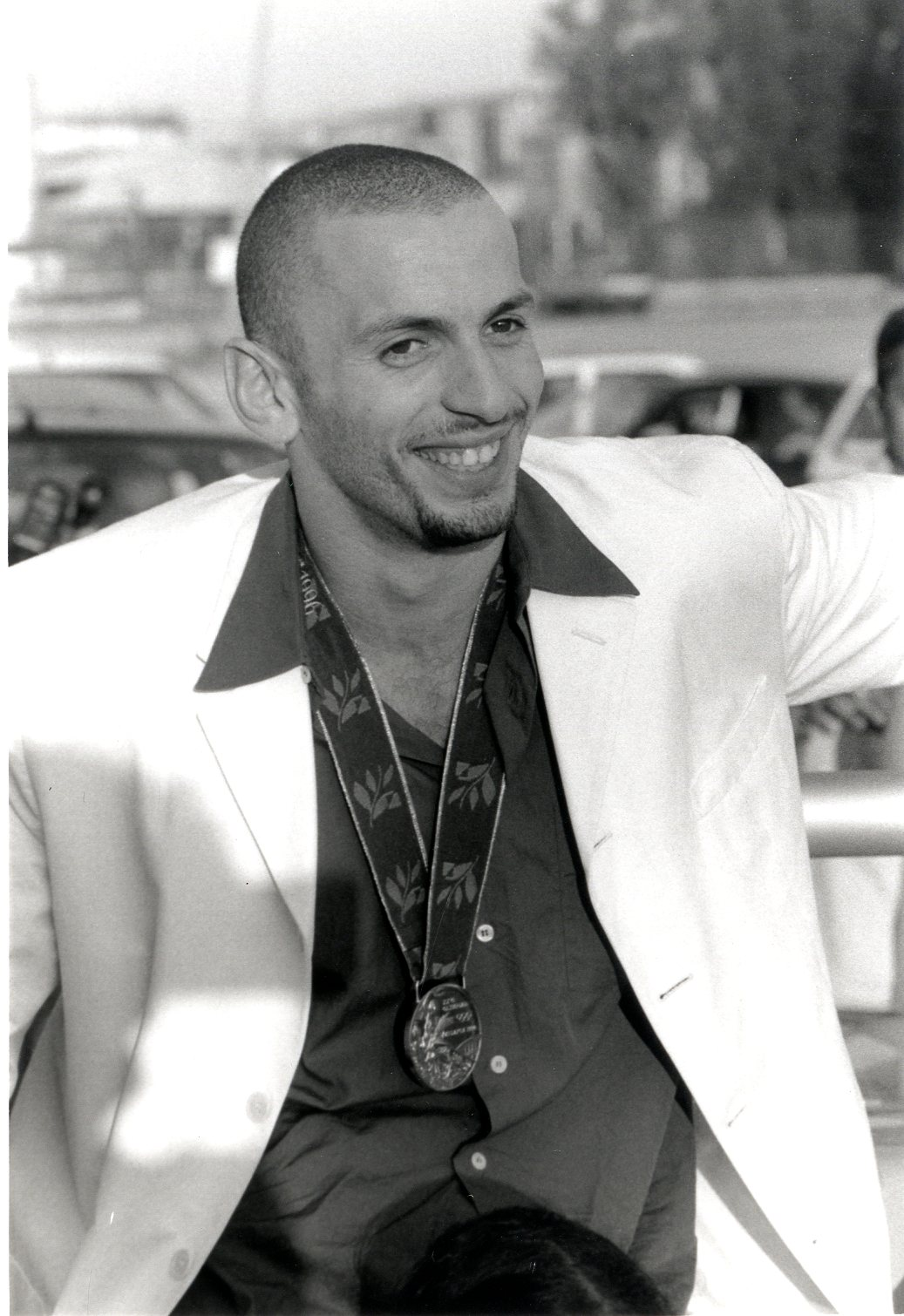
The controversial Djamel Bouras in 1996.

Serge Dyot replaced Gibert as manager for the 1999 season, which was also disrupted by the Bouras affair. Following a heated exchange with Rey, the judoka was confirmed at PSG, but the CAS extended his suspension until March 1999. Meanwhile, Douillet, who had just recovered from his wrist injury, was quickly ruled out again due to back pain. His prolonged absence hurt the club's ambitions; despite excellent campaigns from Demontfaucon and Scottish judoka Graeme Randall, PSG finished fifth in the French Championship and failed to qualify for the Champions League.

Following the 2000 Summer Olympics, in which fellow PSG judokas Bellard, Cyril Soyer and Lionel Hugonnier also competed, Douillet retired and Bouras signed for US Créteil. Nevertheless, the Parisians remained a strong presence in France throughout the 2000 season, securing a Champions League spot following Hugonnier's victory over Maisons-Alfort in the final of the qualifying tournament in December. Demontfaucon continued his individual rise to prominence in 2001, but the club endured a disappointing campaign. PSG missed out on a podium finish at the French Championship in April, losing to Orléans in the third-place match, and then narrowly lost to Moscow a month later after drawing with the Russians (7 wins each, 70–65 to the Muscovites).

PSG's sporting decline was accompanied by the withdrawal of Canal+, their main financial partner, effective after the end of the 2002 season. The Council of Paris stepped in and guaranteed the club's survival beyond that date, with president Rey and manager Dyot still at the helm. After a strong run of qualifying, PSG finished second in the French Championship, synonymous with Champions League qualification, despite the absence of Soyer, who was sidelined with a torn cruciate ligament in his right knee. The club's future became even more turbulent in August 2002, when the press confirmed the imminent departure of star judoka Demontfaucon, who joined former PSG manager Gibert at Toulouse Judo.

On the verge of bankruptcy during the 2003 season, with its judokas unpaid for several months, PSG Judo—led by Soyer, Hugonnier, Bellard, and French prodigy Jean-Dominique Vanbever—reached the final of the French Championship in March, where they were defeated by Parisian rivals Racing Club de France. Lacking the financial means to cover visas and hotel costs for their European campaign, the Council of Paris stepped in to fund the trip. PSG defeated Croatian side Samobor in the first round but were eliminated by two-time European champions Yawara Neva of Saint Petersburg. This marked the final competition for PSG Judo in its original form. In June 2003, after eleven years, PSG's involvement quietly ended. The dissolution of PSG Alliance Judo 77, the last remaining section of the club, officially brought to a close PSG's first multisport project, originally envisioned by Charles Biétry and Canal+ a decade earlier.

=== Rebirth and Europa League double ===
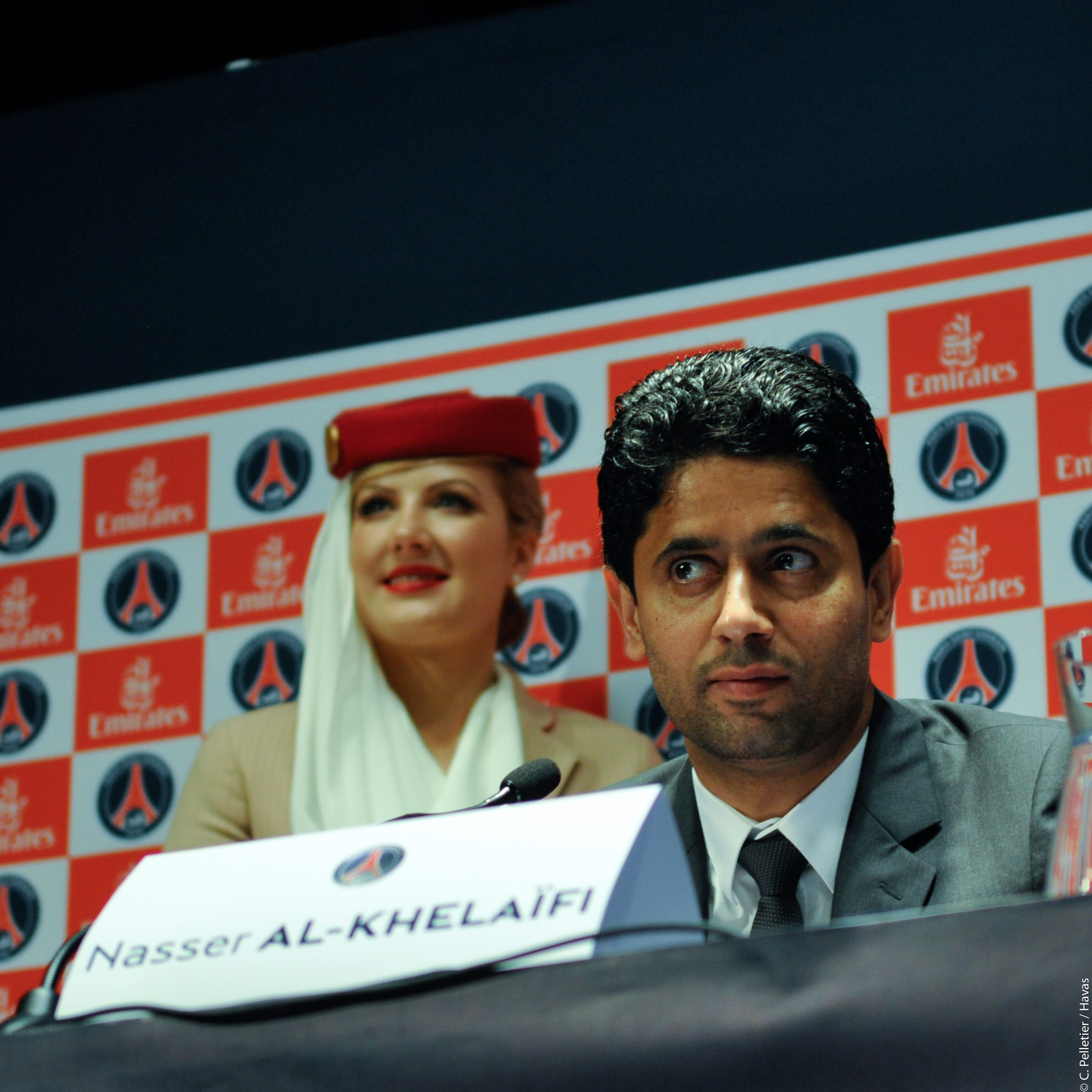
PSG president Nasser Al-Khelaifi relaunched PSG Judo in 2017.

Paris Saint-Germain president Nasser Al-Khelaifi announced the relaunch of Paris Saint-Germain Judo, the club's judo department, on 1 September 2017. French judo star Teddy Riner signed to lead the project and Djamel Bouras was named club president. Both Bouras and a young Riner, who rose through the ranks at the Parisians, were part of the first iteration of PSG Judo between 1992 and 2003. Laurent Calleja in 2017, as well as Nicolas Mossion and Julien Boussuge in 2018, were appointed as managers.

This version of PSG Judo was originally going to be composed of an all-male judo team. Riner was PSG's only judoka during its first year. Walide Khyar, Benjamin Axus and Pape Ndiaye rejected the Parisian project due to the unattractive contractual terms. Its initial all-male focus transformed into a mixed project in 2018, with PSG making several signings, including female judoka Faïza Mokdar, to compete alongside Riner. In October, the club also inaugurated the CMG Dojo, its home ground until 2024. In the 2019 season, the men's team won the French 2nd Division Championship in December. It was PSG's first major trophy since 1997, as well as their first since their resurgence in 2017.

French manager Florent Urani joined the coaching staff for the 2021 season, as the club returned to the European stage. Riner, alongside newcomers Marie-Ève Gahié, Romane Dicko, Alpha Oumar Djalo, Luca Otmane and Amandine Buchard, PSG secured the Europa League double in December. It was the club's first European title since 1995 and its third overall. PSG defeated Russian team UWS Yekaterinburg (men) and Swiss team SGS Sports (women) in the finals, securing a place in next year's Champions League.

In the 2022 season, the club repeated the feat at domestic level in the French 1st Division Championship in May. Riner guided the men's team to victory, while Gahié and Dicko ensured PSG became the first team to achieve the men's-women's double at the French nationals. It was the club's first titles in the competition since the men's team's victory in 1997. In the club's first Champions League appearance since 1994, the women's team claimed the bronze medal after being defeated in the semi-finals by eventual champions Orléans. Meanwhile, the men's team, bolstered by the signing of Alexis Mathieu, finished a disappointing 7th. Another milestone was the signing of Sandrine Martinet and Messaoud Dris. The former became PSG's first Paralympic judoka, while the latter became the club's first permanent foreign judoka.

=== Champions League three-peat ===
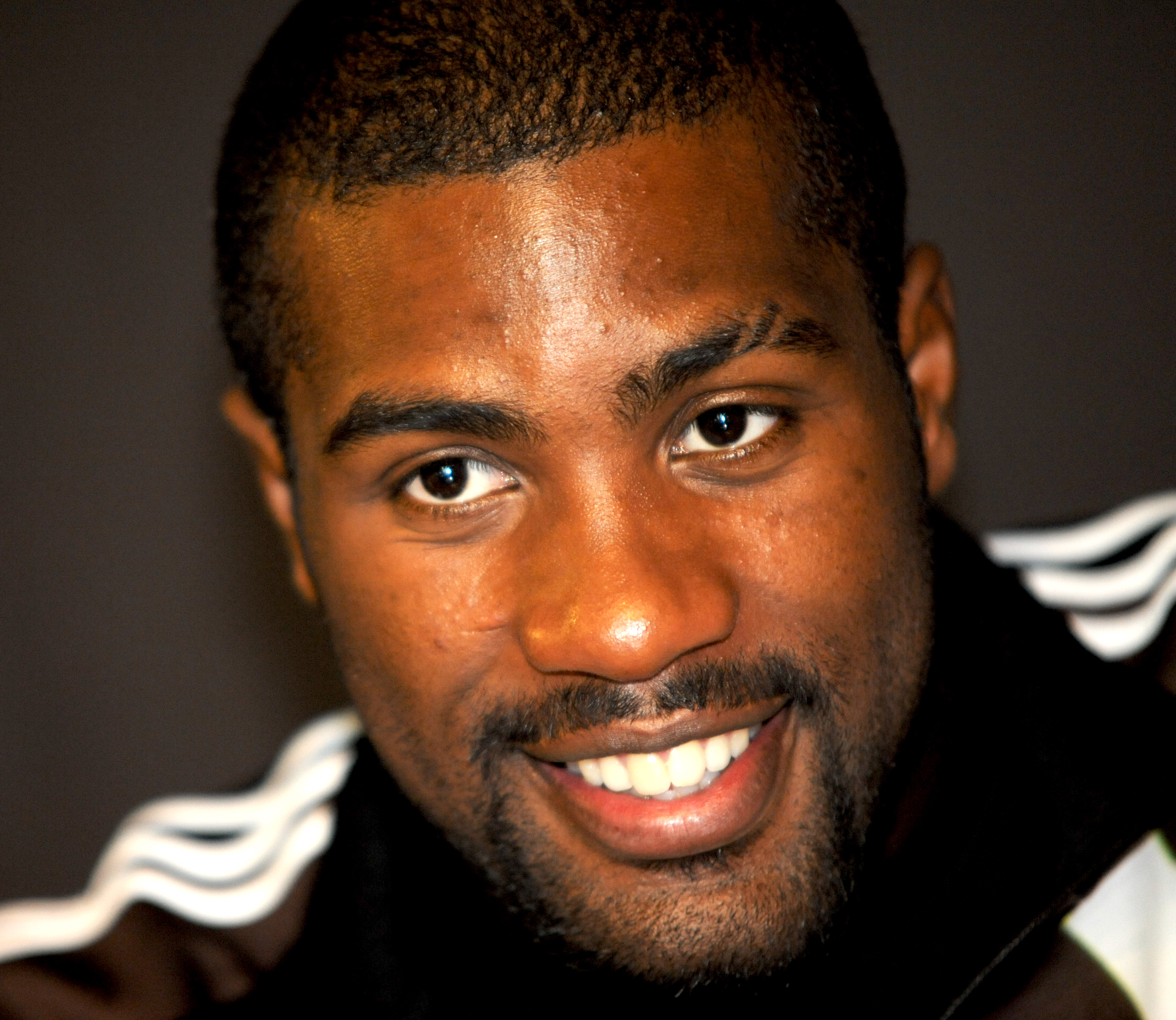
Teddy Riner, the star of the new PSG Judo.

PSG returned to winning ways in the 2023 season, successfully defending their men's and women's titles at the French Championship in May. Ahead of their second consecutive Champions League appearance, the club welcomed Belgian manager Damiano Martinuzzi to replace the outgoing Boussuge in August. In their pursuit of European glory, PSG's ambitious transfer policy remained unchanged. French stars Margaux Pinot, Walide Khyar, Luka Mkheidze, Aleksa Mitrovic, Priscilla Gneto and Audrey Tcheuméo joined in September. Georgian trio Lasha Bekauri, Tato Grigalashvili and Lasha Shavdatuashvili followed suit in November, while British judoka Lucy Renshall was the last to arrive in December. A week later, PSG Judo also signed with Qatar Airways until September 2024, in what was the club's first sponsorship deal.

It was an investment that paid off; the women's team reached the final by beating Bosna in the quarter-finals and Galatasaray Judo in the semi-finals, before winning the Champions League for the first time against compatriots Pontault Combault. Gneto, Renshall and Gahié secured the early victory, meaning Dicko and Buchard no longer had to compete. It was the club's second Champions League title in judo, after the men's team in 1995, as well as the first such trophy for a PSG women's section. The men's team also improved on last season's result; although they failed to beat hosts Beograd in the semi-finals, they did manage to take a bronze medal against Georgian side Golden Gori.

The 2024 season was a transitional one. Baptiste Leroy replaced outgoing coaches Calleja and Urani, while several judokas also left the club, most notably Tcheuméo, Otmane, Buchard, Renshall, Bekauri, Grigalashvili and Shavdatuashvili. Furthermore, PSG left the CMG Dojo and moved into their own dojo, the Espace Omnisports, in September. Despite numerous changes, PSG won their third Champions League title in December. The Champions League format changed from the 2024 edition, uniting female and male athletes as is customary in major international competitions. It was therefore also PSG's first mixed Champions League title. The Parisians defeated Asnières in the quarter-finals and Judo Ukraine in the semi-finals, thanks to performances from Pinot, Gneto and new signing Coralie Hayme. In the final, PSG defeated Red Star Belgrade thanks to points from Riner, Dicko and Mokdar.

PSG continued their positive run into the 2025 season. In February, Dicko's teammates won their third French Championship with the women's team, while their male counterparts claimed the bronze medal. In September, Joan-Benjamin Gaba signed with the capital club until 2029. Gaba, along with Mokdar, Gneto, Gahié, Dicko, and Mathieu, was part of the team that retained its Champions League crown in November. PSG thrashed both Sporting CP in the quarter-finals and Džudo Klub Partizan in the semi-finals by the same 4–0 margin. As in 2024, the final pitted the Parisians against Red Star Belgrade. PSG had to come from behind twice to defeat Red Star 4–2 and win their fourth Champions League title, their third in a row.

=== Domestic and European dominance ===
Despite the departures of managers Mossion and Martinuzzi, PSG Judo won both titles at the 2026 French Team Championships in May. The women's team retained its national title for a fourth consecutive year, while the men's team won the championship after finishing third in the previous edition. The double was the club's first since 2022 and 2023, when both teams also won their respective titles. In October 2026, PSG won the mixed-team Champions League for the third consecutive year, defeating Red Star Belgrade 4–3 in the final. Coached by Baptiste Leroy, the team of 17 judoka defeated Judo Club Konar in the quarter-finals and SGS Judo in the semi-finals. Joan-Benjamin Gaba secured the title by winning the decisive bout.

== Club names ==
Name	Period	Source
PSG Alliance Judo 77	1992–2003	
Paris Saint-Germain Judo	2017–Present	

== Grounds ==
The original version of Paris Saint-Germain Judo, created in September 1992 following the acquisition of the Alliance 77 club in Lagny, inherited the Dojo Léon Bonnet. In March 1997, club president Thierry Rey negotiated in vain with Parisian sports club Athéon to move to the Stade Jean-Bouin. Rey finally found a dojo worthy of the club in 1998: the Aquaboulevard. It remained PSG's home until its demise in 2003, burdened by debt and with over €30,000 in back rent to pay.

Following PSG Judo's revival in 2017, the CMG Dojo served as the club's home ground from 2018 to 2024. Decorated in PSG's colours, it housed the training facilities for the club's professional judokas, as well as the Paris Saint-Germain Judo Academy, which opened in 2023. Club president Djamel Bouras, star judoka Teddy Riner and representatives from other sporting sections of parent club Paris Saint-Germain FC gathered to inaugurate it in October 2018.

PSG and its academy left the CMG Dojo and moved into their own dojo in September 2024: the Espace Omnisports in Le Plessis-Robinson, Hauts-de-Seine. It was officially inaugurated in February 2025 during a ceremony attended by PSG president Nasser Al-Khelaifi, PSG Judo president Bouras and club legend Riner.

The club and its academy are expected to move into Campus PSG in 2028. By then, PSG plans to have constructed two judo dojos, two handball courts, and additional facilities, including a football stadium with a capacity of 5,000 spectators. Owned and funded by the club, the training ground already houses the men's and women's football teams, as well as the football academy, and is projected to also accommodate the handball section and its academy.

== Honours ==
As of 2026 Champions League.

Type	Competitions	Titles	Seasons
National	French 1st Division Championship	8	1997 (M), 2022 (M), 2022 (F), 2023 (M), 2023 (F), 2025 (F), 2026 (M), 2026 (F)
National	French 2nd Division Championship	1	2019 (M)
European	Champions League	5	1995 (M), 2023 (F), 2024 (Mixed) 2025 (Mixed), 2026 (Mixed)
European	Europa League	2	2021 (M), 2021 (F)

== Judokas ==
As of 22 October 2026.

=== Current squad ===
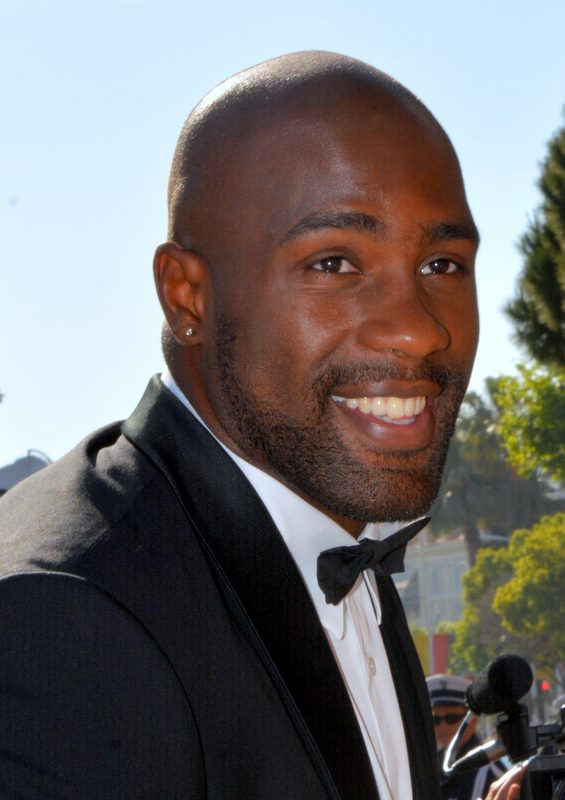
Teddy Riner

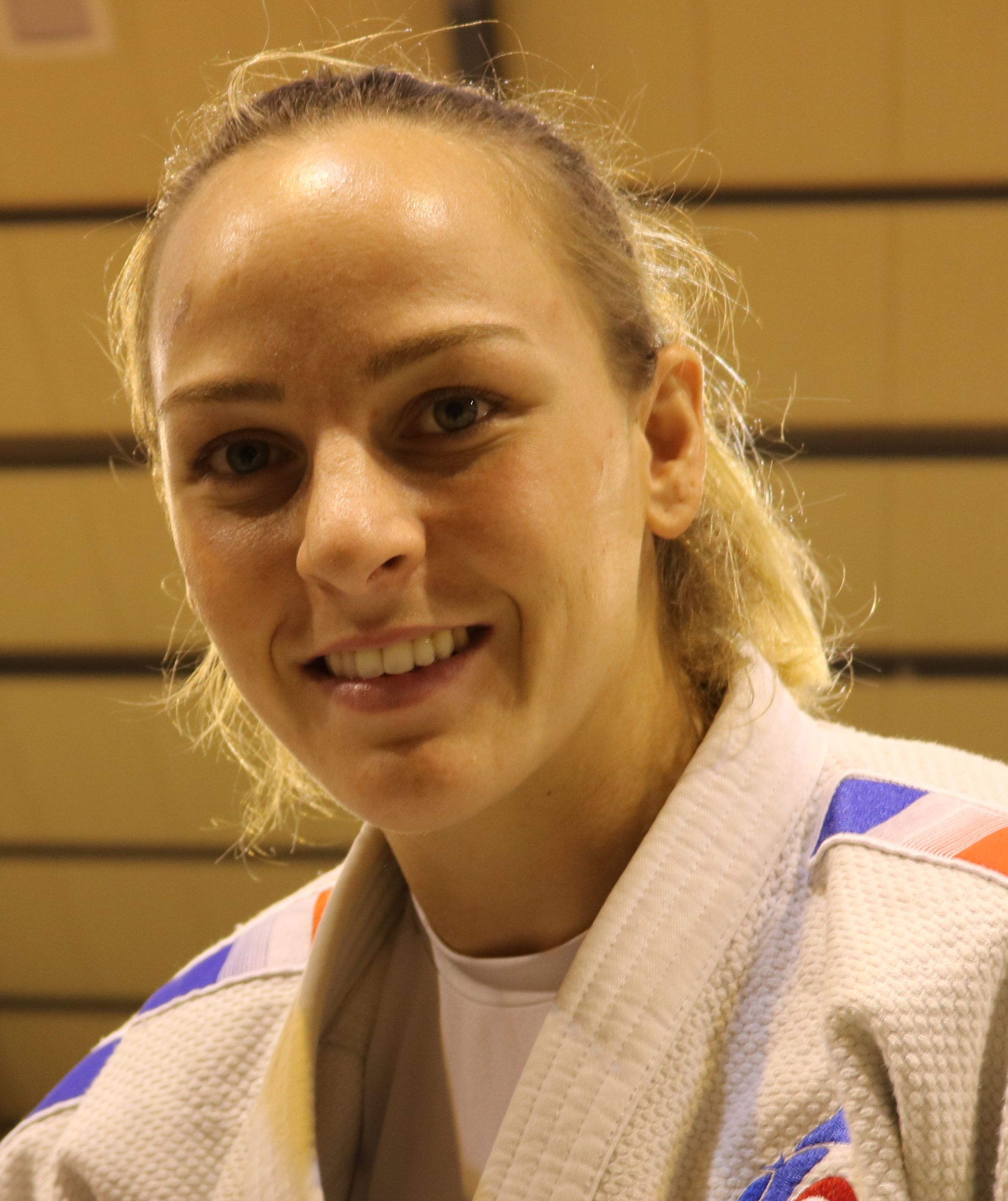
Margaux Pinot

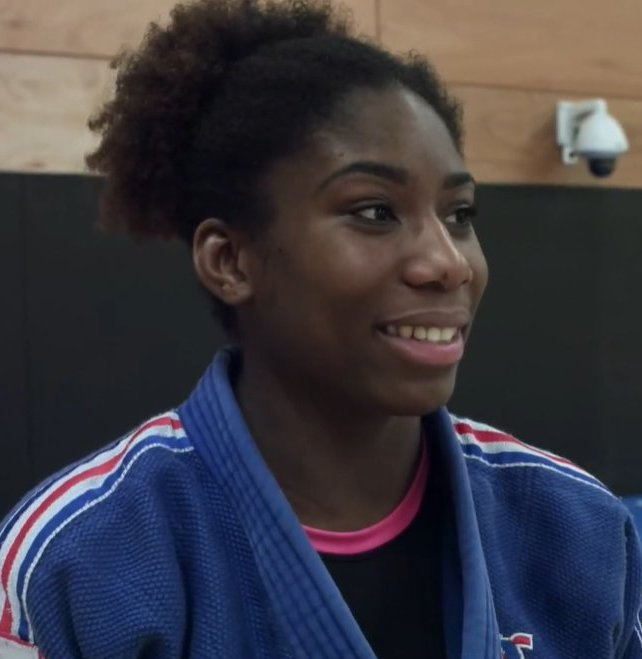
Marie-Ève Gahié

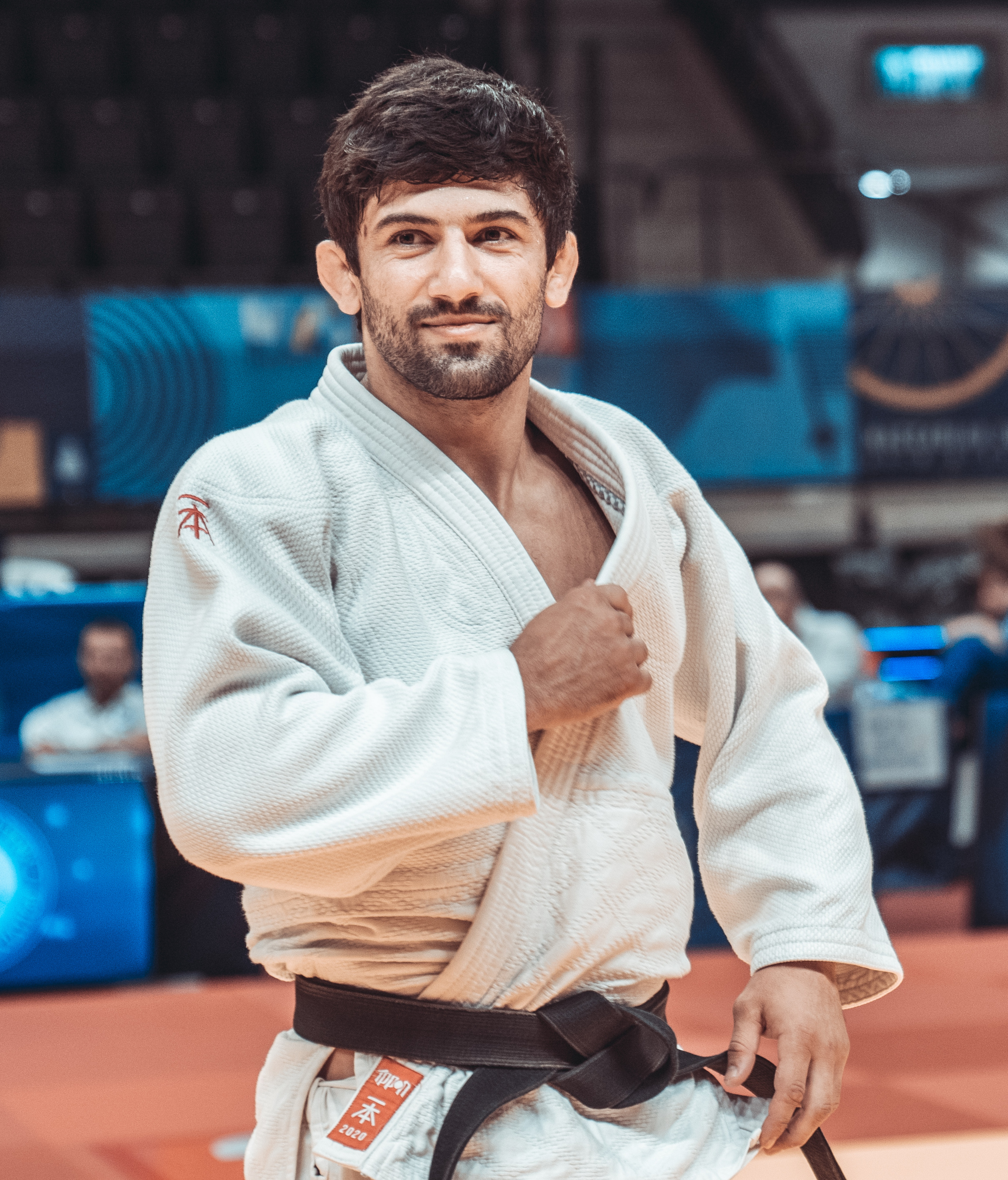
Lasha Shavdatuashvili

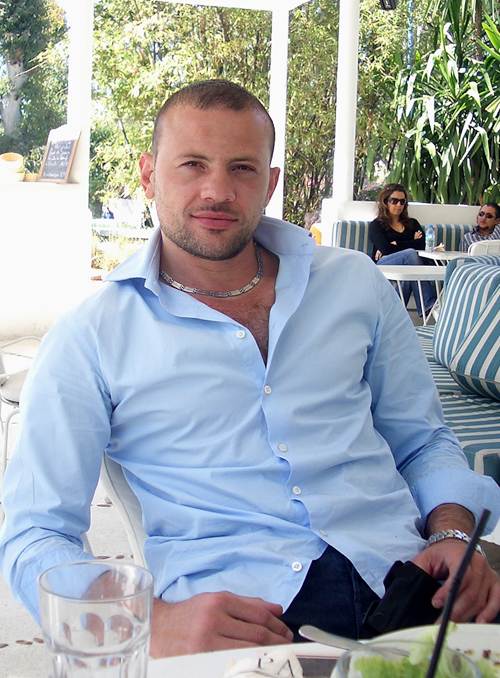
Lionel Hugonnier

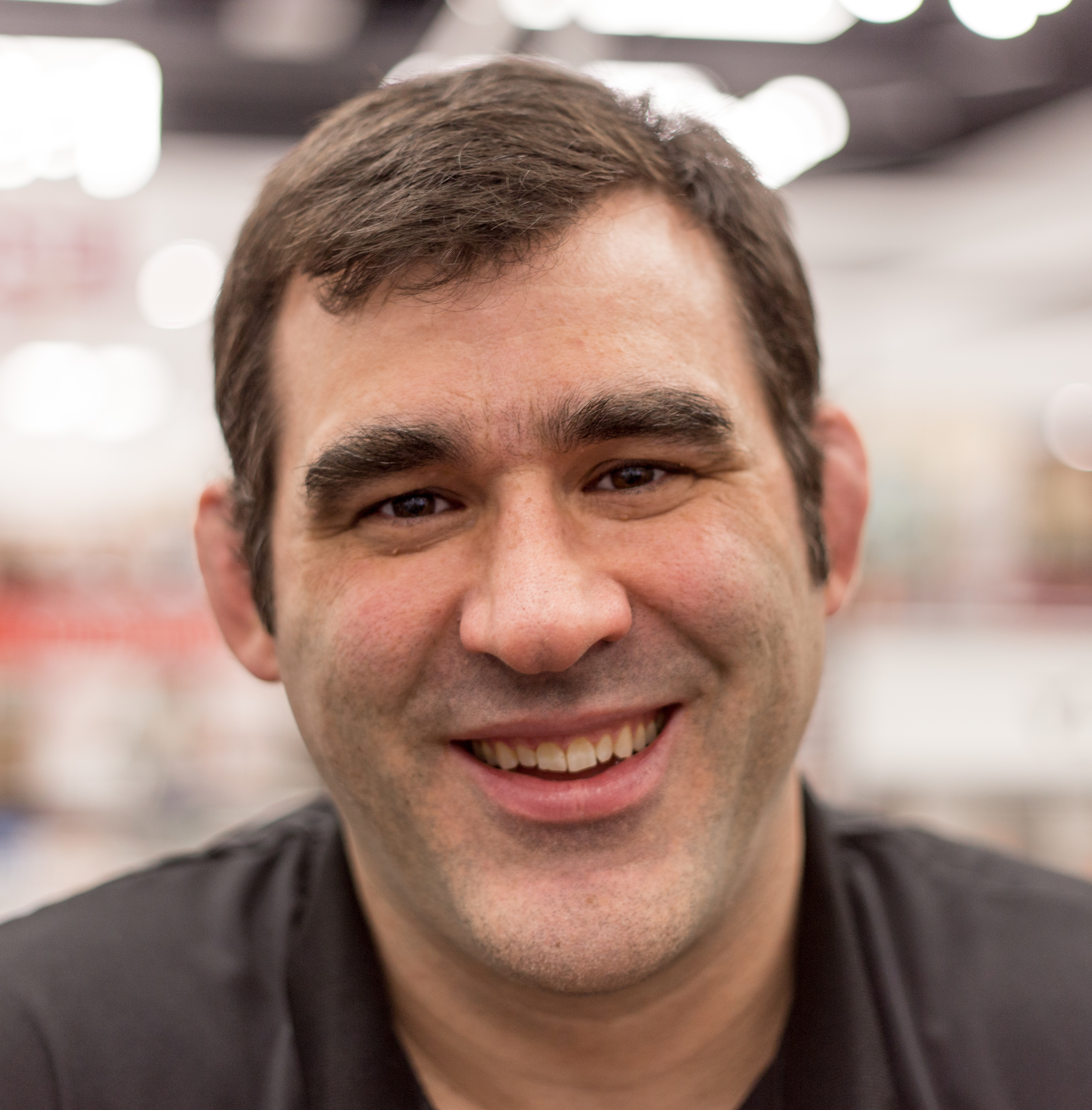
Nicolas Gill

Judoka	Paris Saint-Germain	Weight class	Sex	Source
(France) Teddy Riner	2017–2024, 2026–	+100 kg	M	
(France) Kévin Nzuzi Diasivi	2025–	+100 kg	M	
(France) Noah Boué-Kossa	2024–	−90 kg	M	
(France) Aleksa Mitrovic	2023–	−90 kg	M	
(France) Alexis Mathieu	2022–	−90 kg	M	
(France) Eniel Caroly	2018–2023, 2026–	−90 kg	M	
(France) Léonie Minkada-Caquineau	2026–	+78 kg	F	
(France) Coralie Hayme	2024–	+78 kg	F	
(France) Romane Dicko	2020–	+78 kg	F	
(France) Joan-Benjamin Gaba	2025–	−73 kg	M	
(Algeria) Messaoud Dris	2023–	−73 kg	M	
(France) Emma Feuillet-Nguimgo	2025–	+70 kg	F	
(France) Chloé Jean	2026–	−70 kg	F	
(France) Margaux Pinot	2023–	−70 kg	F	
(France) Marie-Ève Gahié	2020–	−70 kg	F	
(France) Walide Khyar	2023–	−66 kg	M	
(France) Alexis Renard	2022–	−66 kg	M	
(France) Manon Deketer	2026–	−63 kg	F	
(France) Enzo Jean	2026–	−60 kg	M	
(France) Astride Gneto	2026–	−57 kg	F	
(France) Clarisse Carillon	2026–	−52 kg	F	
(France) Luka Mkheidze	2023–	−60 kg	M	
(France) Priscilla Gneto	2023–	−57 kg	F	
(France) Faïza Mokdar	2018–	−57 kg	F	
(France) Alicia Marques	2026–	−52 kg	F	
(France) Sandrine Martinet	2022–	−52 kg	F	

=== Notable athletes ===
Judoka	Paris Saint-Germain	Weight class	Sex	Source
(France) Jean-Dominique Vanbever	2001–2003	−100 kg	M	
(France) David Douillet	1993–2000	+95 kg	M	
(United Kingdom) Raymond Stevens	1994–1996	−95 kg	M	
(France) Philippe Demarche	1992–1996	−95 kg	M	
(Georgia (country)) Lasha Bekauri	2023–2024	−90 kg	M	
(France) Frédéric Demontfaucon	1996–2002	−86 kg	M	
(France) Lionel Hugonnier	1995–2003	−86 kg	M	
(Canada) Nicolas Gill	1994–1998	−86 kg	M	
(Georgia (country)) Tato Grigalashvili	2023–2024	−81 kg	M	
(France) Alpha Oumar Djalo	2020–2025	−81 kg	M	
(France) Audrey Tcheuméo	2023–2024	−78 kg	F	
(Scotland) Graeme Randall	1997–1999	−78 kg	M	
(France) Djamel Bouras	1996–2000	−78 kg	M	
(France) Bertrand Amoussou-Guenou	1992–1995	−78 kg	M	
(France) Dayyan Boulemtafes	2024–	−73 kg	M	
(Georgia (country)) Lasha Shavdatuashvili	2023–2024	−73 kg	M	
(France) Luca Otmane	2020–2024	−73 kg	M	
(France) Christine Cicot	1995–1996	+72 kg	F	
(France) Laurence Sionneau	1992–1995	−72 kg	F	
(France) Jessy Euclide	1995–1998	−71 kg	M	
(France) Philippe Taurines	1993–1998	−71 kg	M	
(France) Franck Bellard	1998–2003	−66 kg	M	
(France) Christophe Brunet	1994–1998	−65 kg	M	
(France) Nasser Nechar	1992–1997	−65 kg	M	
(United Kingdom) Lucy Renshall	2023–2024	−63 kg	F	
(France) Karine Petit	1992–1999	−61 kg	F	
(France) Cyril Soyer	1999–2003	−60 kg	M	
(United Kingdom) Jamie Johnson	1997–1998	−60 kg	M	
(France) Amandine Buchard	2021–2024	−52 kg	F	
(France) Laetitia Tignola	1993–1995	−52 kg	F	
(France) Cécile Nowak	1992–1994	−52 kg	F	

== Personnel ==
=== Presidents ===
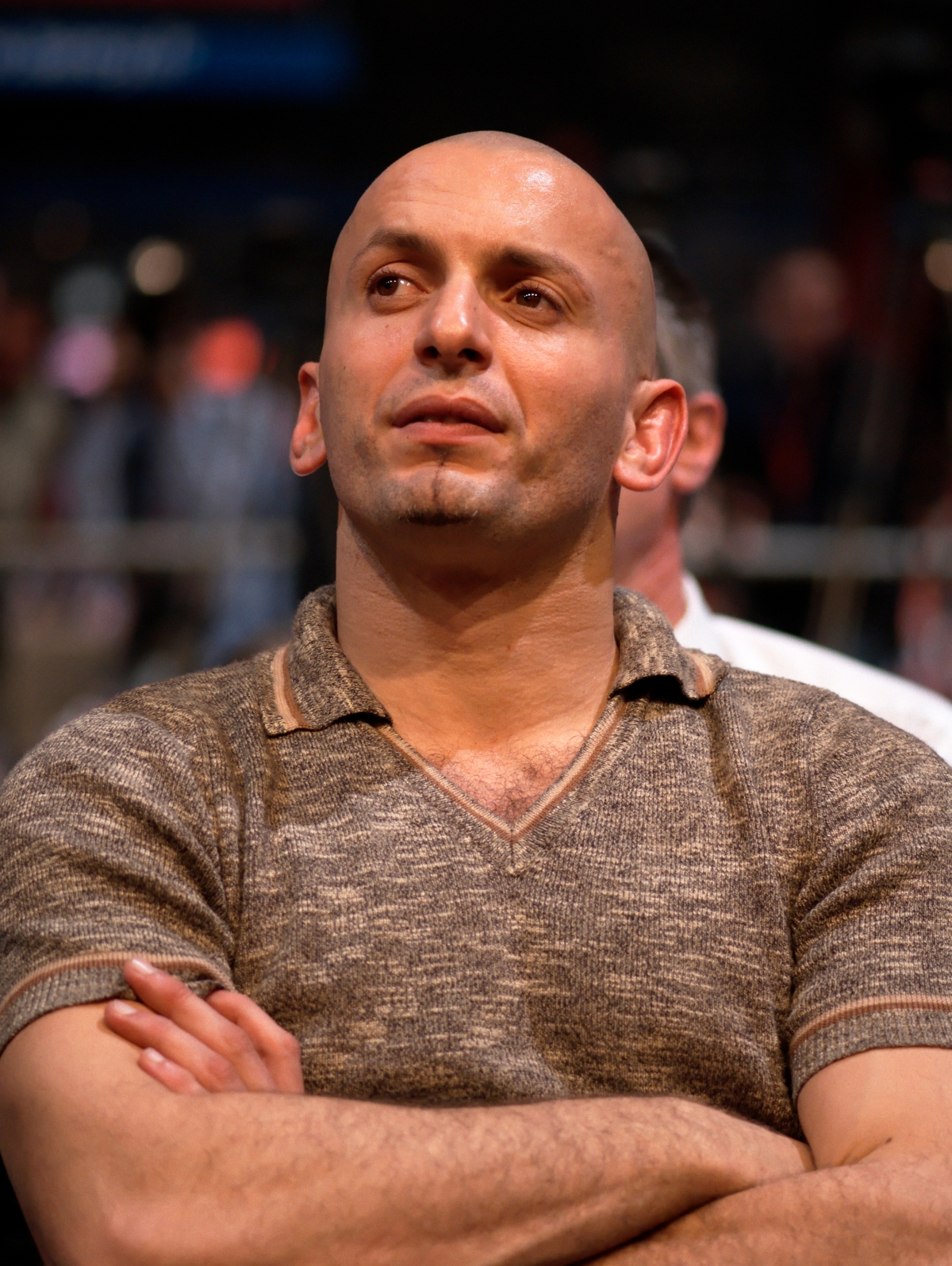
Djamel Bouras

No.	Name	Tenure	Source
1	(France) Thierry Rey	1992–2003	
2	(France) Djamel Bouras	2017–	

=== Managers ===
No.	Name	Tenure	Source
1	(France) Jean-Pierre Gibert	1994–1999	
2	(France) Serge Dyot	1999–2003	
3	(France) Laurent Calleja	2017–2024	
4	(France) Nicolas Mossion	2018–2025	
5	(France) Julien Boussuge	2018–2023	
6	(France) Florent Urani	2021–2024	
7	(Belgium) Damiano Martinuzzi	2023–2025	
8	(France) Baptiste Leroy	2024–	
