= Levallois =

Levallois may refer to:

- Levallois-Perret, a commune in the northwestern suburbs of Paris, France
- Nicolas-Eugène Levallois, developer of Village Levallois, now part of Levallois-Perret
- Levallois technique, an archaeology term for a type of stone knapping from the Paleolithic period
- Levallois SC, a football club based in Levallois-Perret
- Levallois Metropolitans, a basketball club based in Levallois-Perret
- Levallois Sporting Club, sport club and Olympic training center in Levallois-Perret
