= 1996 Ju-Jitsu World Championships =

- Host city: Paris, France
- Organiser: JJIF
- Dates: 23–24 November
- Main venue: Stade Pierre de Coubertin

The 1996 Ju-Jitsu World Championship were the 2nd edition of the Ju-Jitsu World Championships, and were held in Paris, France from November 23 to November 24, 1996.

== Schedule ==
- 23.11.1996 – Men's and Women's Fighting System, Women's Duo System – Classic, Mixed Duo System – Classic
- 24.11.1996 – Men's and Women's Fighting System, Men's Duo System – Classic

== European Ju-Jitsu ==
=== Fighting System ===
==== Men's events ====
Category	Gold	Silver	Bronze	
–62 kg	Kelly Molinari (FRA)	Taco Morren (NED)	Musse Hasselvall (SWE)	Daniel Gascó (ESP)
–72 kg	Johan Blomdahl (SWE)	Michel van Rijt (NED)	Fernando Yanasaki (BRA)	Alejandro Pérez (ESP)
–82 kg	Bertrand Amoussou (FRA)	Ben Rietdijk (NED)	Ricard Carneborn (SWE)	Juan Moreno (ESP)
–92 kg	Lionel Hugonnier (FRA)	Joachim Göhrmann (GER)	Lars Petersson-Leman (SWE)	Hannes Ganselmayer (AUT)
+92 kg	Christophe Julve (FRA)	Ivan Vega (ESP)	Wilfred Derks (NED)	Marcelo Figueiredo (BRA)

==== Women's events ====
Category	Gold	Silver	Bronze	
–58 kg	Laurence Delvingt (FRA)	Esther Oostlander (NED)	Ulrike Limmer (GER)	Sonia Gómez (ESP)
–68 kg	Anna Dimberg (SWE)	Ute Niendorf (GER)	Francisca Moreno (ESP)	Giuseppina Mennillo (ITA)
+68 kg	Pia Larsen (DEN)	Jennie Brolin (SWE)	Michaela Rasch (GER)	Laurence Sionneau (FRA)

=== Duo System ===
==== Duo Classic events ====
Category	Gold	Silver	Bronze	
men	Jure Pignar (SLO); Tomaž Pivec (SLO)	Thomas Darholt (DEN); Kent Hielscher (DEN)	Kåre Nordström (SWE); Morgan Nordström (SWE)	Eric Candori (FRA); Stéphane Freschi (FRA)
women	Karina Lauridsen (DEN); Vibeke Mortensen (DEN)	Monica Laxfors (SWE); Isabelle Sarfati (SWE)	Claudine Aucordier (FRA); Florence Bailly (FRA)	(NED) (NED)
mixed	Stefan Lindström (SWE); Sara Johansson (SWE)	Gabriele Gardini (ITA); Valeria Zaccaria (ITA)	Ferdinand Fuhrmann (AUT); Sabine Kampf (AUT)	Antonio Da Costa (FRA); Minh-Minh Ngo (FRA)
