= Champions League (judo) =

European judo competition

European Club Championships Champions League
- Current season, competition or edition: 2026
- League: European Club Championships
- Sport: Judo
- Founded: 1976
- First season: 1976
- Most recent champion: Mixed team: PSG Judo
- Most titles: Men: Yawara Newa St. Petersburg (10); Women: US Orléans (6); Mixed: PSG Judo (3)

The Champions League (formerly European Club Cup, until 2017 Golden League) is a competition for European men's and women's judo club teams. Like the Europa League, it is held under the umbrella of the European Judo Union. The top 8 clubs of the previous year but maximally three teams per national association are eligible to start.

== Winner ==
=== Mixed teams ===
Season	Host	Champion	Vice-Champion	Third place	Source
2024	Montpellier	PSG Judo	Red Star	Judo Nice	
2024	Montpellier	PSG Judo	Red Star	Golden Gori	
2025	Belgrade	PSG Judo	Red Star	Golden Gori	
2025	Belgrade	PSG Judo	Red Star	JENYS	
2026	Paris	PSG Judo	Red Star	JENYS	
2026	Paris	PSG Judo	Red Star	ACBB Boulogne	

=== Men ===
Season	Host	Champion	x:x	Vice-Champion	Semi-final Loser / Third Place	Source
1976	Maisons-Alfort	Racing Club de France Paris	4:1 – 5:4	JC Nippon Zürich	?	
1977		SC Dynamo Hoppegarten	6:0 – 7:0	Sports School Boersma Amersfoort	?	
1978		Slavija Prag	4:2 – 1:2	JC Rüsselsheim	?	
1979		VfL Wolfsburg	6:1 – 5:2	Sports School Boersma Amersfoort	JC Slavija Novi Sad	
1980		VfL Wolfsburg	5:2 – 4:3	JC Slavia Novi Sad	Sporting CP / ?	
1981		VfL Wolfsburg	5:2 – 3:4	JC Villiers de bel Paris	JC Wien	
1982		JC Villiers de bel Paris	5:2 – 4:2	Željezničar Sarajevo	VfL Wolfsburg	
1983		JC Rüsselsheim	3:1 – 3:4	TSV Großhadern	JC Grenchen	
1983		JC Rüsselsheim	3:1 – 3:4	TSV Großhadern	JC Oooms Tilburg	
1984		JC Rüsselsheim	4:0 – 5:1	TJ Vysoke Prag	JC Impol	
1985		US Orléans	2:2 – 4:1	JC Manner Wien	?	
1986		US Orléans	3:2 – 1:2	Wolverhampton JC	?	
1987		US Orléans	5:1 – 2:5	VfL Wolfsburg	?	
1988		Racing Club de France Pars	5:2 – 4:1	VfL Wolfsburg	?	
1989		US Orléans	5:4 – 4:3	Racing Club de France Paris	TSV Abensberg	
1990		US Orléans	3:2 – 3:2	Carabinieri Rom	Judo Club Maison Alfort ?	
1991		Racing Club de France Paris	4:2 – 3:4	SC Berlin	?	
1992	Paris	SC Berlin	4:4 (33:30)	TSV Abensberg	Sanjindo Bischofshofen	
1993	Berlin	Racing Club de France Paris	5:2 (45:20)	JC Frankfurt/Oder	?	
1994	Paris	TSV Abensberg	5:2 (50:20)	Racing Club de France Paris	?	
1995		PSG Judo	3:3 (27:25)	JC Taifu Dnjepropetrowsk	?	
1996	Paris	TSV Abensberg	6:1 (47:10)	US Orléans	Kenamju Haarlem PSG Judo	
1997	Abensberg	TSV Abensberg	4:3 (37:23)	PSG Judo	MTV Ingolstadt; TSV Großhadern	
1998	Abensberg	Kenamju Haarlem	5:2 (39:17)	PSG Judo	TSV Abensberg	
1999	Oradea	Liberty Oradea	6:0 (55:0)	JC Taifu Dnjepropetrowsk	Kenamju Haarlem JC Mytnyk	
2000	Abensberg	TSV Abensberg				
2001	Haarlem	Yawara Newa St. Petersburg	4:3	Kenamju Haarlem	TSV Abensberg Istanbul Büyüksehir	
2002	Abensberg	Yawara Newa St. Petersburg	8:6	TSV Abensberg	Petrom Liberty Oradea TSV Abensberg	
2003	Haarlem	Kenamju Haarlem	9:4	TSV Abensberg	Yawara Newa St. Petersburg Sambo-70 Moskau	
2004	Abensberg	Yawara Newa St. Petersburg	13:1	Istanbul Büyüksehir	TSV Abensberg Kenamju Haarlem	
2005	Tallinn	Yawara Newa St. Petersburg	9:4	TSV Abensberg	Sambo-70 Moskau BBC Istanbul	
2006	Budapest	TSV Abensberg	8:4	Yawara Newa St. Petersburg	JC Sagarevo Tiflis Istanbul Büyüksehir	
2007		Yawara Newa St. Petersburg		Team Gladiator	Levallois SC Sambo-70 Moskau	
2008	Tallinn	Turkey Caykur Spor Club Rize		Team Gladiator	TSV Abensberg Levallois SC	
2009		Russia Yawara Newa St. Petersburg	8:2	Levallois SC	Kocaeli Spor Club TSV Abensberg	
2010		Yawara Newa St. Petersburg		Saint-Genevieve Sport	Kocaeli Spor Club TSV Abensberg	
2011	Antalya	Levallois SC		JC Chilly-Mazarin Morangis	TSV Abensberg Yawara Newa St. Petersburg	
2012	Istanbul	TSV Abensberg		Yawara Newa St. Petersburg	Galatasaray Istanbul Sainte-Genvieve Sport	
2013	Paris	TSV Abensberg		Levallois SC	Dinamo RNO-Alania Yawara-Neva	
2014	Samara	Yawara-Neva		Dinamo RNO-Alania	TSV Abensberg Levallois SC	
2015	Wien	Fighters Tbilisi		TSV Abensberg	Yawara-Neva Sporting CP	
2016	Grozny	Sagarejo FF Superstars		Yawara-Neva	Fighters Tbilisi Sporting CP	
2017	Ankara	Yawara-Neva		New Stream	Fighters Tbilisi Sporting CP	
2018	Bucharest	Sporting CP	3:2	Yawara Newa St. Petersburg	Edelweiss	Red Star Belgrade
2019	Odivelas	Sporting CP	3:2	Yawara Newa St. Petersburg	Red Star Belgrade	Golden Gori
2020		cancelled due to coronavirus pandemic				
2021	Paris	Yawara Newa St. Petersburg		Red Star Belgrade	Golden Gori TSV Abensberg	
2022	Gori	Fighter Tbilisi	3:2	Red Star Belgrade	Golden Gori Judo Stabia	
2023	Belgrade	OJK Beograd		Aris JC	PSG Judo Red Star Belgrade	

* 1986: Due to the tiebreaker and the undervaluation, three playoffs were played, which Orleans won 2-1.

=== Women ===
Season	Host	Champion	Vice-Champion	Third place	Source
2023	Belgrade	PSG Judo	JC Pontault Combault	Galatasaray	
2023	Belgrade	PSG Judo	JC Pontault Combault	RSC Champigny	
