= 1994 Ju-Jitsu World Championships =

- Host city: Cento, Italy
- Organizer: Ju-Jitsu International Federation
- Edition: 1
- Sport: Ju-Jitsu
- Dates: 25–27 November

The 1994 Ju-Jitsu World Championship were the 1st edition of the Ju-Jitsu World Championships, and were held in Cento, Italy from November 25 to November 27, 1994.

== European Ju-Jitsu ==
=== Fighting System ===
==== Men's events ====
Category	Gold	Silver	Bronze
–62 kg	Jonatan Vega (ESP)		
–72 kg	Philippe Taurines (FRA)		Michel van Rijt (NED)
–82 kg	Bertrand Amoussou (FRA)		Ben Rietdijk (NED)
–92 kg	Lionel Hugonnier (FRA)		
+92 kg	Marcelo Sequiera (BRA)		

==== Women's events ====
Category	Gold	Silver	Bronze
–58 kg	Esther Oostlander (NED)		
–68 kg	Anna Dimberg (SWE)		
+68 kg	Laurence Sionneau (FRA)		

=== Duo System ===
==== Duo Classic events ====
Category	Gold	Silver	Bronze
men	Aleksander Majhen (SLO); Grega Novak (SLO)		
women	Nieves Rodríguez (ESP); Isabel Talavera (ESP)		
mixed	Gabriele Gardini (ITA); Valeria Zaccaria (ITA)		
