= European Club Championship =

European Club Championship may refer to one of several competitions:

- EHF Men's Champions Trophy, known as the Men's European Club Championship until 2007
- EHF Women's Champions Trophy, known as the Women's European Club Championship until 2007
- Futsal European Clubs Championship a futsal competition that ran from 1984 until the creation of the UEFA Futsal Cup in 2001
- European Club Championships (Judo)
- European Club Championships, a chess competition
