= Niclas, Graf von Abensberg =

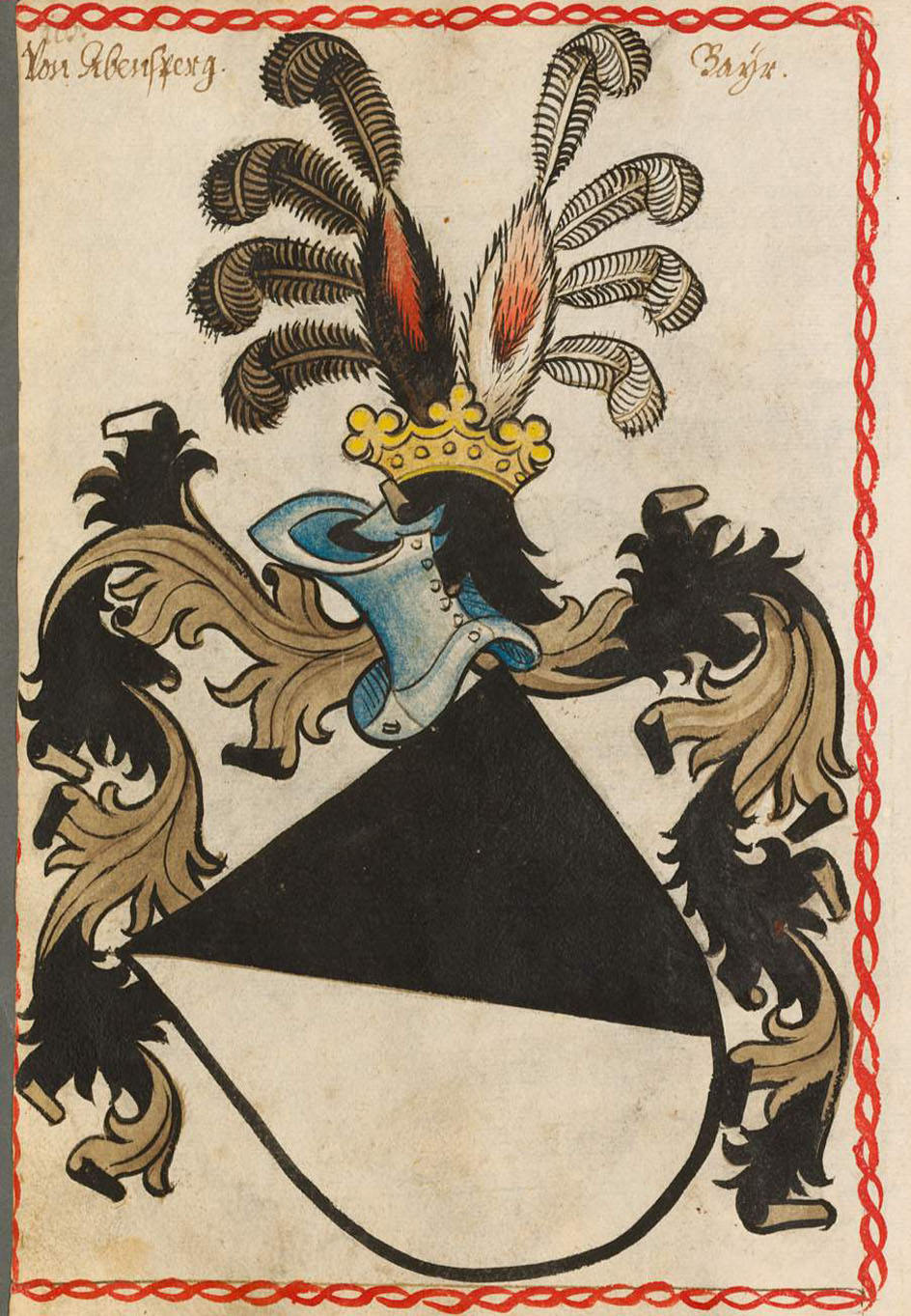
Coat of arms of the counts of Abensberg

Niclas, Graf von Abensberg (1441 – 28 February 1485) was a knight and nobleman under the reign of Louis IX, Duke of Bavaria.

Originating from an old family of considerable means ruling at Abensberg (Bavaria), Niclas came as a young man to the Court of Louis IX in Landshut. He took part in the battle of Singen in 1462. He was assigned the tenures of Graisbach, Riedenburg and Kelheim.

In the dispute among the sons of Albert III, Duke of Bavaria, Niclas sided with the elder son Duke Albert IV and arrested the younger Duke Christof. The quarrel was settled, but reemerged fourteen years later. Once more, Niclas led the troops of Albrecht IV, conquering Päl, Weilheim and Landsberg without meeting resistance. However, as Niclas and the other noblemen returned home, they were ambushed by Duke Christof. After Niclas surrendered, he was stabbed by a varlet and died.

As Niclas was childless, he was the last of the family of von Abensberg.
