= Uwe Brandl =

German politician

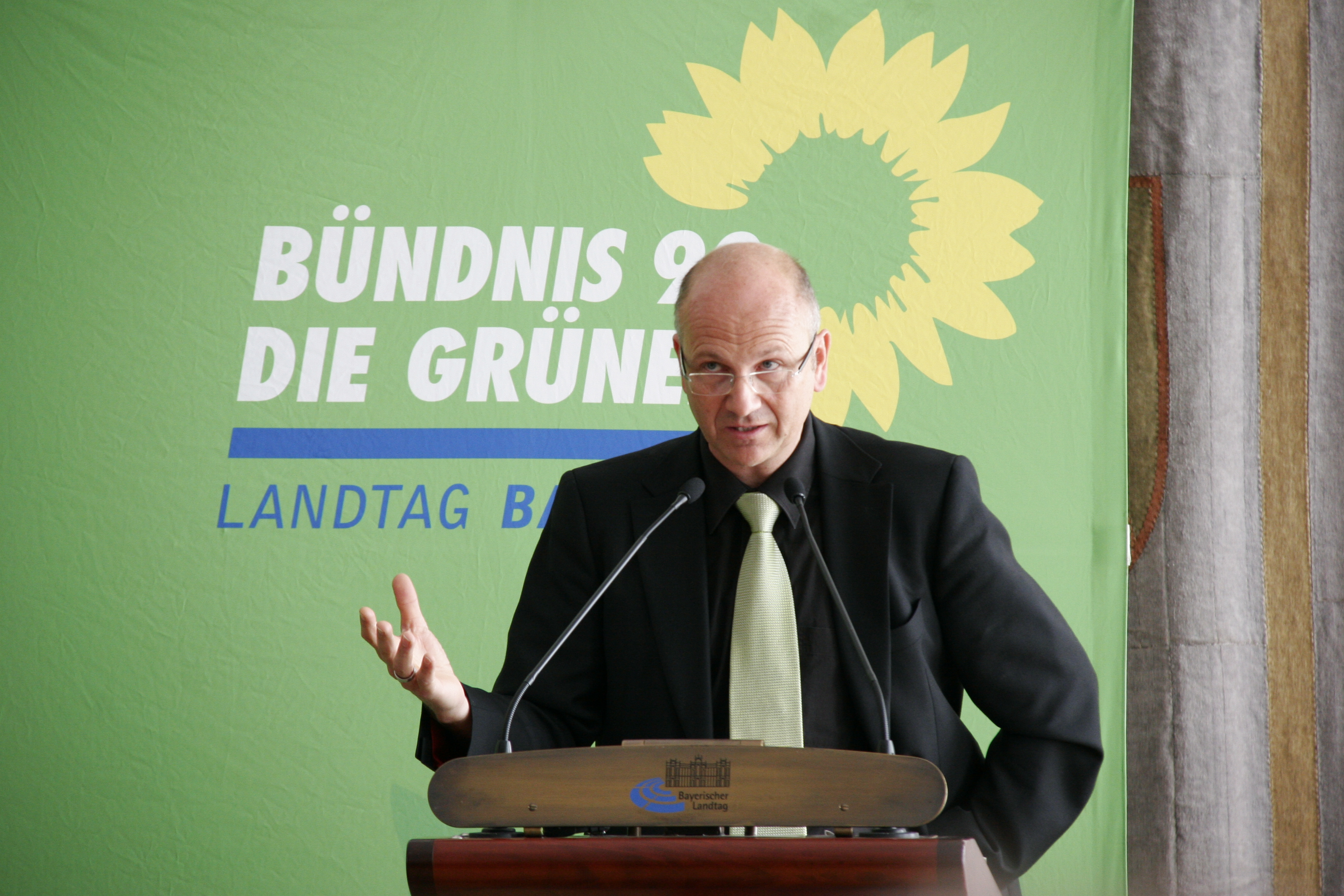
Uwe Brandl (2011)

Uwe Brandl (born 27 October 1959 in Abensberg, Lower Bavaria) is a German politician, representative of the Christian Social Union of Bavaria.

He was mayor of the city of Abensberg from 1993 to 2023 and has served as President of the Bayerischer Gemeindetag.

== Awards and decorations ==
- 1992: Badge of Honour of the Bundeswehr
- 2005: Soldnermedaille (Bavaria)
- 2007: Federal Cross of Merit
- 2010: Bavarian Order of Merit
- 2021: Federal Cross of Merit 1st class

== Bibliography ==
- Kommunale Konzepte (2002) ISBN 978-3-88947-081-2
- Statusreport Neues Kommunales Rechnungswesen in Bayern (2003) ISBN 978-3-7825-0457-7
- Praxiswissen für Kommunalpolitiker (2004) ISBN 978-3-7825-0474-4

== See also ==
- List of Bavarian Christian Social Union politicians
