= Levallois Sporting Club Judo =

Judo club

The Levallois Sporting Club Judo is a judo club affiliated to the Levallois Sporting Club. It's one of the biggest judo clubs in France with 800 members. Champions of the club include Teddy Riner, Gévrise Émane and Benjamin Darbelet.

== History ==
The first judo club in Levallois was founded in 1949. In 1984, the club was integrated into the Levallois Sporting Club, a brand new omnisport club. In a few years, the club became one of the most important judo club in France and in 1996, Marie-Claire Restoux became the first Olympic champion in club history. Since then, the LSC Judo is home to a multitude of champions like Teddy Riner and Gévrise Émane. Its head coach is Roger Vachon who is also a member of the selection committee for the French team.

The men's team took third place in the European Championships for Clubs in the years 2007 and 2008.

== Notable judokas ==
=== Past ===
- Matthieu Dafreville
- Benjamin Darbelet
- Gévrise Émane
- Cathy Fleury
- Stephanie Possamai
- Marie-Claire Restoux
- Gella Vandecaveye

== See also ==
- Levallois Sporting Club
