= Lionel Hugonnier =

French judoka (born 1973)

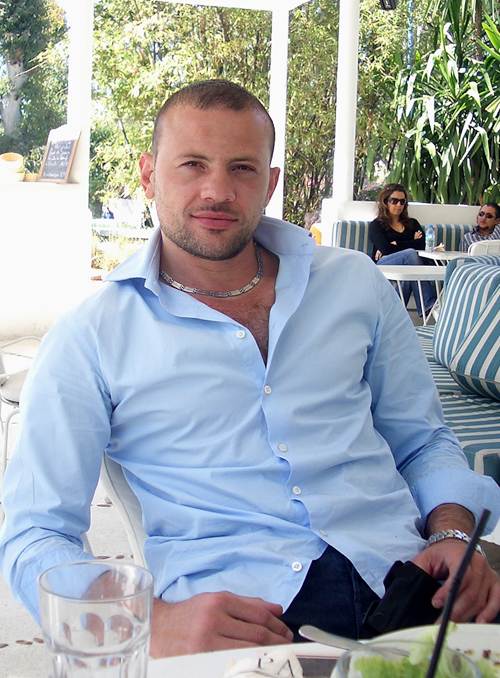
- Hugonnier in 2009

Personal information
- Born: 17 April 1973 (age 53)
- Occupation: Judoka

Sport
- Sport: Judo
Medal record
Representing France
Judo
European Judo Championships
Bronze medal – third place	2002 Maribor	Team
Men's sport ju-jitsu
World Championships
Gold medal – first place	1994 Cento	Fighting System
Gold medal – first place	1996 Paris	Fighting System
European Championships
Gold medal – first place	1995	Fighting System

Profile at external databases
- JudoInside.com: 363

Lionel Hugonnier (born 17 April 1973) is a French former judoka and ju jitsuka athlete competing in the (under 90 kg) category for Judo and light heavyweight (under 92 kg) in Ju Jitsu.

After he did his military service at Bataillon de Joinville in 1993, he joined INSEP in his hometown Lyon.

In 1994, for his 1st international selection at the age of 21, he became World Champion in Ju Jitsu, making him one of the youngest athletes to ever hold this title.

In 1995, he won the European Champion title.

In 1996 in Coubertin (Paris), he defended his title as World Champion in front of his fans and he held the title for the second time. His numerous medals made him one of the most decorated athletes in Ju-jitsuka in France with his club team member Bertrand Amoussou. He withdrew from the competing in Ju Jitsu in 1996 and ended his career without any defeat.

In 1997, after his French Champion title in Judo, he joined the French team, under the direction of René Rambier. He remained with PSG Judo throughout his career, with partner clubs David Douillet, Djamel Bouras under the direction of Thierry Rey.

Medalist in global tournaments, including 2 medals at the International Tournament of the City of Paris (bronze in 1998 and silver in 2002), he then competed for the French team in the 1998 World Cup in Minsk (Belarus) and won third place.

His successful career in athletics came to an end after a shoulder injury in 2003.

== Professional career ==
After his career in athletics ended in 2003, Lionel Hugonnier created NOBUCO with four former members of the French Judo Team. The company specialized in providing sporting equipment. The company quickly gained success and became one of the main players in the sports' equipment industry.

In 2006, he created a subsidiary in Casablanca (Morocco) to distribute its products in the growing market of North Africa.

In 2009, the company continued its development between France and Morocco, with a constant growth.

In 2012, he launched the TATAMIZ brand that offers a wide range of children's products under Disney and Hello Kitty licenses. This allows NOBUCO to enter major accounts of the large-scale distribution.

In 2013, after a successful capital increase, Teddy Riner joined the company and became a partner of Lionel Hugonnier.

In 2014, the first products of Teddy Riner license appear in some prestigious sales channels.

In 2015, The Company opened a purchasing office in Hong Kong.

== Painting ==
Artist and painter, Lionel Hugonnier exhibited his paintings done in parallel to his professional activity. Inspired by such eclectic influences as Picasso, Klimt, Michelangelo, but also Free figuration, an exhibition was dedicated to him in his hometown Lyon in 2010.

== Palmares ==
=== JU JITSU ===
Category / Year	World Championships of jujistu 1994 Bologna	European Championship of jujistu 1995 Athens	World Championships of jujistu 1996 Paris
Light Heavyweight (−92 kg)	Gold	Gold	Gold

=== JUDO ===
- 1993 : Miami Tournament winner
- 1995 : Champion of France 2nd Div.
- 1996 : Belgium Tournament winner
- 1997 : Tournament winner All Categories Kyoto (Japan)
- 1998 : Champion of France 1st Div.
- 1998 : 3rd in the Paris tournament (TIVP)
- 1998 : 3rd World Team Cup
- 1999 : 3rd in the Seoul tournament (Korea)
- 2001 : Winner of the tournament Leonding (Austria)
- 2001 : 3rd tournament Budapest (Hungary)
- 2002 : 3rd tournament in Moscow (Russia)
- 2002 : 2nd Paris Tournament (TIVP)
- 2003 : 3rd tournament in Rome (Italy)
- 2003 : 3rd field by Team Europe
