= Galatasaray Judo =

Judo club

Galatasaray
- Founded: 1984
- League: Turkish Judo Championship
- Based in: İstanbul, Turkey
- Arena: Burhan Felek Sports Complex
- Colors: Yellow & Red
- President: Dursun Özbek
- Head coach: Ali Demir
- Championships: 3
- Mascot: Lion
- Website: galatasaray.org

Galatasaray Judo (Turkish: Galatasaray Judo Şubesi) is the Judo section of Galatasaray S.K., a major sports club in Istanbul, Turkey. There is also a Judo school in Burhan Felek Sports Complex.

== Member judoka ==
Female judo champion Majlinda Kelmendi became the first Kosovan athlete to win a gold medal at the Olympic Games in 2016 while a member of the Galatasaray team.

- Hasret Bozkurt (born 2001)
- Fidan Ögel (born 2002)
- Ayten Yeksan (born 2002)

== Honors ==
=== Turkish Championship ===
- Turkish Judo Team Championship:
  - Winners (3) : 2011, 2012, 2013
- 1985: (gold)
- 2006: (bronze)
- 2010 Mümine Demir (70 kg) (silver)
- 2010 Derya Çidem (48 kg) (bronze)

=== Turkish Senior Championship ===
- 2007: (silver)

=== İstanbul Championship ===
- 2007: (gold)

=== International ===
- 2023: (bronze) European Judo Club Championships - Champions League Women 2023
- 2021: (gold) European Judo Club Championships - Golden League Women 2021
- 2019: (bronze) European Judo Club Championships - Golden League Women 2019
- 2018: (bronze) European Judo Club Championships - Golden League Women 2018
- 2017: (bronze) European Judo Club Championships - Golden League Women 2017
- 2016: (bronze) European Judo Club Championships - Golden League Women 2016
- 2014: (gold) European Judo Club Championships - Women 2014
- 2013: (bronze) European Judo Club Championships - Women 2013
- 2012: (bronze) European Judo Club Championships - Women 2012
- 2012: (gold) Galatasaray Judo Team - 2012 European Judo League
- 2012: (bronze) Bayram Ceylan - 2012 European U23 Judo Championships Men's 73 kg
- 2010: (bronze) Ramila Yusubova - 2010 World Judo Championships Women's 63 kg
- 2010: (bronze) Kifayat Gasimova - 2010 Judo Grand Slam Tokyo
- 2011: (bronze) Belkıs Zehra Kaya - 2011 World Cup Women - Rome, Italy October 1–2
