= Europa League (Judo) =

Judo club tourtument

European Club Championships Europa League
- Most recent season or competition: 2021
- League: European Club Championships
- Sport: Judo
- Founded: 2014
- First season: 2014
- Most recent champions: M: PSG Judo (FRA); W: PSG Judo (FRA)
- Most titles: M: Fighter Tbilisi (GEO) (2); W: (1)

The Europa League is a European judo club team championship for men and women. Like the Champions League, it is held under the umbrella of the European Judo Union. Four clubs of the national club championships are eligible to start.

== Winner ==
=== Men ===
Season	Host	Champion	Vice-Champion	Dritter
2014	Hoofddorp	Fighter Tbilisi	Kenamju Haarlem	Sporting Clube de Portugal Red Star Belgrade
2015	Tbilisi	Sagarejo	KBR Nalchik	Edelweiss Grozny Shevardeni 2005
2016	Belgrade	New Stream	Red Star Belgrade	JC Akademik SGS Judo
2017	Wuppertal	Edelweiss Grozny	CJ Valencia	Hamburger Judo Team Aris JC
2018	Bucharest	Golden Gori	ESBM Blanc-Mesnil	Ratiborets FLAM 91
2019	Odivelas	Fighter Tbilisi	Sucy Judo	TSV Abensberg Aris JC
2020	cancelled due to coronavirus pandemic			
2021	Prague	PSG Judo	SGS Judo	SC Akhmat SC UWS
2022	was not held			

=== Women ===
Season	Host	Champion	Vice-Champion	Third place
2014	Hoofddorp	JSV Speyer	Judo Club Cortaillod	Kenamju Haarlem SGS Judo
2015	Tbilisi	JTS Noord-oost	SK Shabolovka	Dinamo Rno-alania AJ Limoges
2016	Belgrade	Valencia CJ	Slavija Novi Sad	Yawara-Neva JC Pontault Combault
2017	Wuppertal	FLAM 91	1. JC Mönchengladbach	Fiamme Gialle Roma JC Vinkovci
2018	Bucharest	RSC Champigny	ESBM Blanc-Mesnil	SGS Judo Ratiborets
2019	Odivelas	US Orléans	Ujisk Slavija	SGS Judo Olymp Krasnodar
2020	cancelled due to coronavirus pandemic			
2021	Prague	PSG Judo	SC UWS	ESBM Blanc-Mesnil
2022	was not held			
