= Joseph von Hazzi =

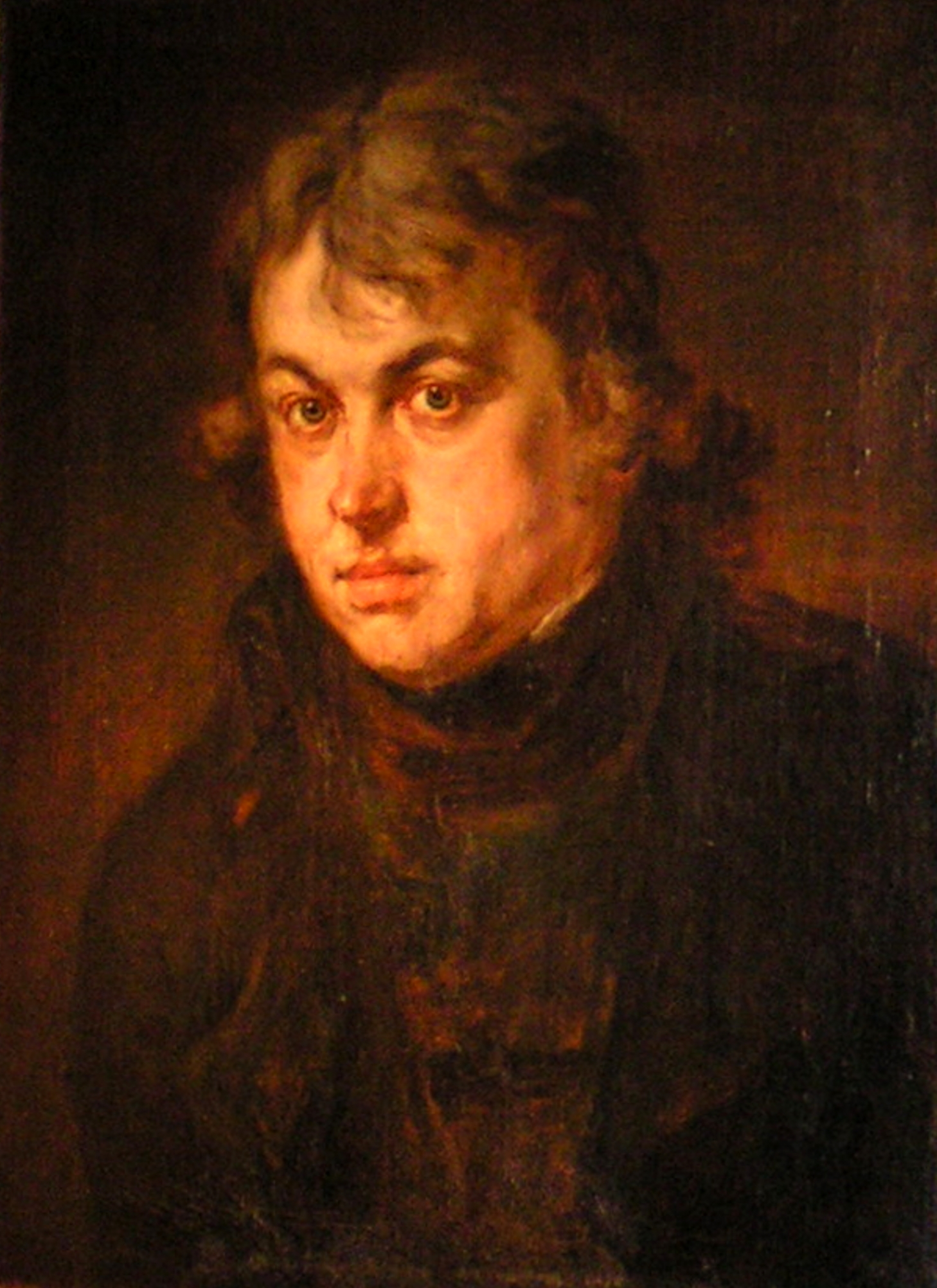
Joseph von Hazzig.

Joseph Ritter von Hazzig (12 February 1768 – 20 May 1845) was a Bavarian official.

== Biography ==
Hazzi was born in Abensberg. After studying law, he became Privy Councillor and Councillor of the Bavarian General State Directorate in Munich. His field was mainly the promotion of Bavarian agriculture; his 1799 proposal for the construction of the Main-Danube-Canal was rejected. He died in Elkofen.

His father-in-law was the president of the Bavarian High Court of Appellation Aloys Basselet von La Rosée.
