= Levallois Sporting Club Escrime =

The Levallois Sporting Club Escrime is a fencing club linked to the Levallois Sporting Club. It's one of the biggest fencing club in the world with 800 members. The president is Jean-Jacques Poulain and Frederic Delpla is manager. Among the champions of the club, you can count Maureen Nisima, Gauthier Grumier and Ulrich Robeiri.

== History ==
The club was created in 1983. Its first president was Mario Malucchi. During that time, the club had 50 members. In 1987 and 1988, a lot of champions were recruited by the LSC Escrime, among them, Frédéric Delpla, Hervé Faget, Joël Bouzou and Eric Srecki.

Afterward, Laura Flessel, Hugues Obry, Rémy Delhomme, Matthieu Denis, Sarah Daninthe, Maureen Nisima, Ulrich Robeiri et Gauthier Grumier came in Levallois and bought medals to the club.

== Handisport ==
The club is well known for its handisport section. Robert Citerne and Yannick Maillard, both members of the club, are among the best fencers in wheelchairs in the world.

== Notable fencers ==
=== Present ===
- Maureen Nisima
- Gauthier Grumier
- Ulrich Robeiri

=== Past ===
- Laura Flessel
- Hugues Obry
- Eric Srecki

== See also ==
- Levallois Sporting Club
