= Džudo Klub Partizan =

Judo club

- Founded: 1953
- Colors
- Website: Official website

Džudo Klub Partizan is a Judo club from Belgrade, Serbia. The club is part of the sports society JSD Partizan and was established on August 15, 1953.

Today the club has operations in three cities - Belgrade, Novi Sad and Kikinda.

The club celebrated its 50th anniversary in 2009.

== History ==
Judo in the former Yugoslavia developed after World War II. The first clubs were established in the 1950s, first in the city of Zagreb. In 1953 Judo came to Belgrade, with the establishment of the clubs Radnicki and Partizan.

== Honours ==
The National Judo Championship in Yugoslavia started in 1955. Partizan won its first national title in 1963, and followed again in 1964. The best international result was second place at the European Judo championship in 1959.

Men:

- Yugoslavian Championship
  - Winners (2) : 1963, 1964
- Serbian Championship
  - Winners (5) : 1994, 2000, 2005, 2007, 2008
- Serbian Cup
  - Winners (1) : 2007
- European Judo championship
  - Runners-up (1) : 1959

Women:

- Serbian Championships
  - Winners (1) : 2025

== Notable members ==
- Stojan Stojaković - Champion of Yugoslavia in the middle division in 1960, 1963, in open division in 1961, 1962, and 1963
- Mladen Vukomanović - Champion of Yugoslavia in heavy category in 1959, open division in 1960, middle division in 1961
- Borivoje Cvejić - Champion of Yugoslavia in heavy weight category in 1960, 1962, 1963 and 1964
- Spase Savić - Champion of Yugoslavia in middle category in 1965 and 1967
- Slobodan Nikolić - Champion of Yugoslavia in middle category in 1968
