= Abensberg =

- Town
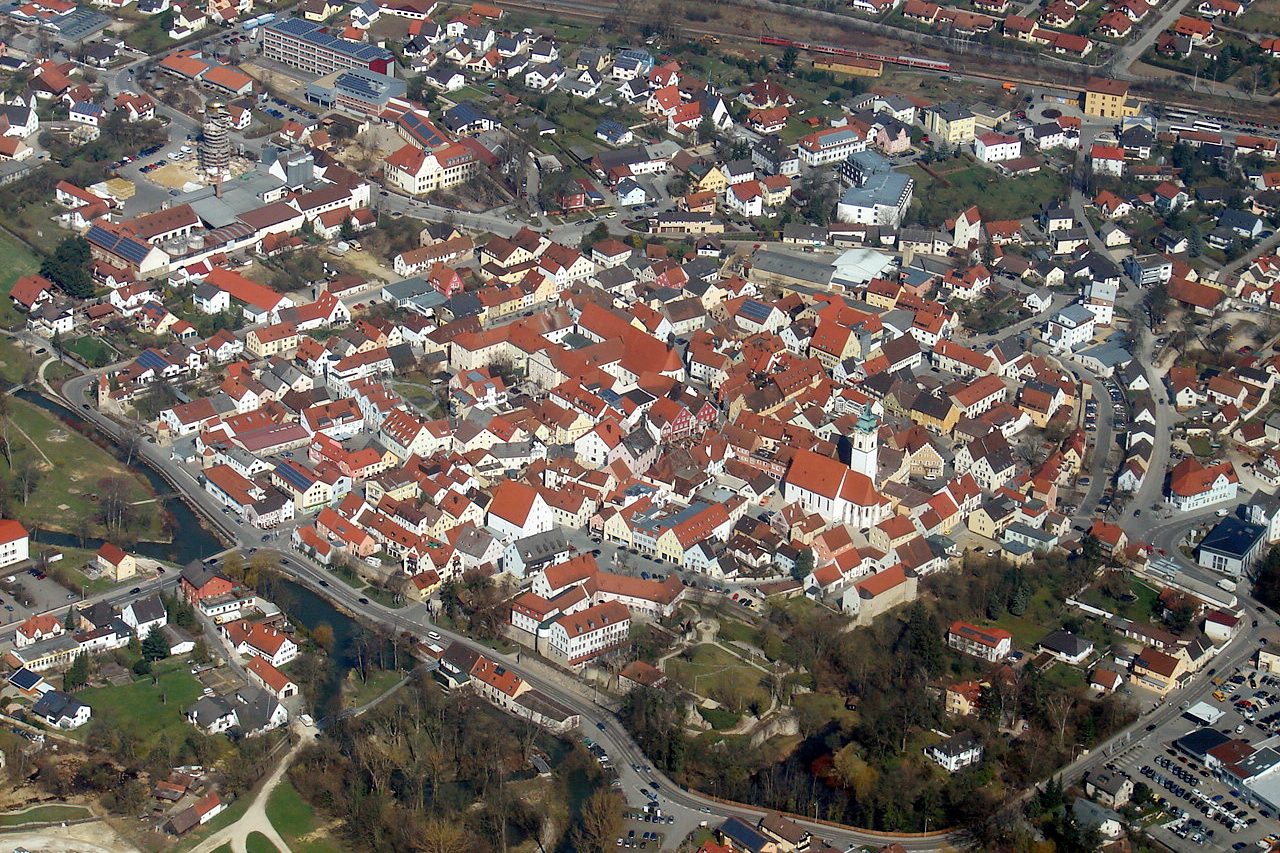
- Aerial view of Abensberg's Old Town

- Coat of arms

- Location of Abensberg within Kelheim district
- Interactive map of Abensberg
- Location within Germany Location within Bavaria
- Coordinates: 48°48′N 11°51′E
- Country: Germany
- State: Bavaria
- Admin. region: Niederbayern
- District: Kelheim
- Subdivisions: 7 Ortsteile

Government
  - Mayor (2023–29): Dr. Bernhard Resch

Area
  - Total: 60.27 km^{2} (23.27 sq mi)
- Elevation: 370 m (1,210 ft)

Population (2025-12-31)
  - Total: 15,254
  - Density: 253.1/km^{2} (655.5/sq mi)
- Time zone: UTC+01:00 (CET)
  - Summer (DST): UTC+02:00 (CEST)
- Postal codes: 93326
- Dialling codes: 09443
- Vehicle registration: KEH
- Website: www.abensberg.de

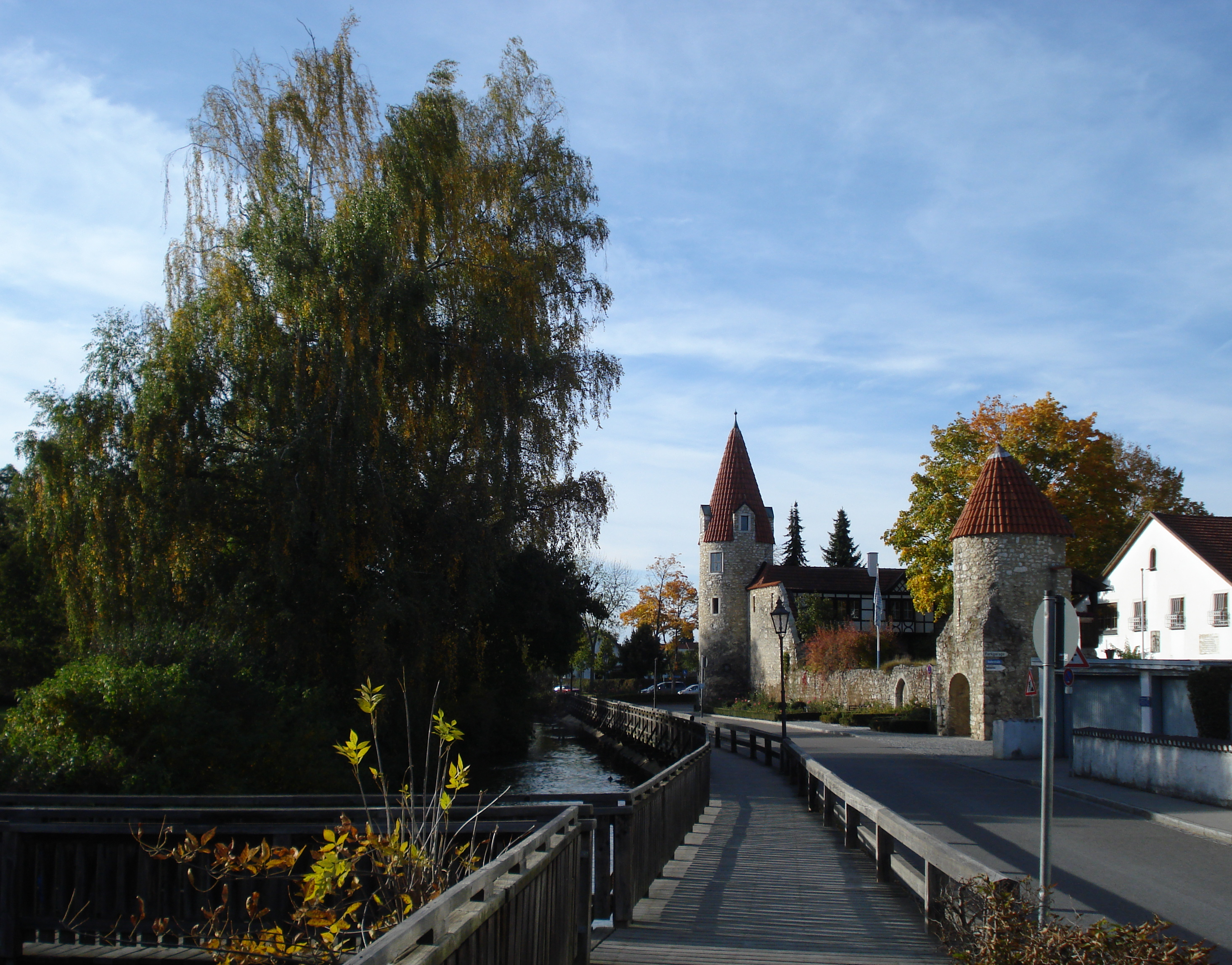
Maderturm

Abensberg (German pronunciation: [ˈaːbənsˌbɛʁk]) is a town in the Lower Bavarian district of Kelheim, in Bavaria, Germany, lying around 30 km (19 mi) southwest of Regensburg, 40 km (25 mi) east of Ingolstadt, 50 km (31 mi) northwest of Landshut and 100 km (62 mi) north of Munich. It is situated on the river Abens, a tributary of the Danube.

== Geography ==
The town lies on the Abens river, a tributary of the Danube, around eight kilometres from the river's source. The area around Abensberg is characterized by the narrow valley of the Danube, where the Weltenburg Abbey stands, the valley of the Altmühl in the north, a left tributary of the Danube, and the famous Hallertau hops-planting region in the south. The town is divided into the municipalities of Abensberg, Arnhofen, Holzharlanden, Hörlbach, Offenstetten, Pullach and Sandharland.

=== Divisions ===
Since the administrative reforms in Bavaria in the 1970s, the town also encompasses the following Ortsteile:

- In the town: Abensberg (main settlement), Aunkofen (civil parish), Badhaus (village)
- To the east: Gaden (village), See (village), Offenstetten (civil parish)
- To the north east: Arnhofen (civil parish), Baiern (village), Pullach (civil parish), Kleedorf (village)
- To the north: Sandharlanden (civil parish), Holzharlanden (civil parish), Buchhof (small hamlet)
- To the west: Schwaighausen (village), Schillhof (hamlet), Gilla (small hamlet)
- To the south: Aumühle (small hamlet), Allersdorf (hamlet)
- To the south east: Lehen (small hamlet), Mitterhörlbach (hamlet), Upper Hörlbach (village), Lower Hörlbach (hamlet)

== History ==
There had been settlement on this part of the Abens river since long before the High Middle Ages, dating back to Neolithic times. Of particular interest and national importance are the Neolithic flint mines at Arnhofen, where, around 7,000 years ago, Stone Age people made flint, which was fashioned into drills, blades and arrowheads, and was regarded as the steel of the Stone Age. Traces of over 20,000 individuals were found on this site. The modern history of Abensberg, which is often incorrectly compared with that of the third century Roman castra (military outpost) of Abusina, begins with Gebhard, who was the first to mention Abensberg as a town, in the middle of the 12th century. The earliest written reference to the town, under the name of Habensperch, came from this time, in around 1138. Gebhard was from the Babonen clan.

In 1256, the castrum of Abensprech was first mentioned, and on 12 June 1348, Margrave Ludwig of Brandenburg, and his brother, Duke Stephen of Bavaria, raised Abensberg to the status of a city, giving it the right to operate lower courts, enclose itself with a wall and hold markets. The wall was built by Count Ulrich III of Abensberg. Some of the thirty-two round towers and eight turrets are still preserved to this day.

In the Middle Ages, the people of Abensberg enjoyed a level of autonomy above their lord. They elected a city council, although only a small number of rich families were eligible for election.

In around 1390, the Carmelite Monastery of Our Lady of Abensberg was founded by Count John II and his wife, Agnes. Although Abensberg was an autonomous city, it remained dependent on the powerful Dukes of Bavaria. The last Lord of Abensberg, Niclas, Graf von Abensberg, supposedly named after his godfather, Nicholas of Kues, a Catholic cardinal, was murdered in 1485 by Christopher, a Duke of Bavaria-Munich. The year before, Niclas had unchivalrously taken Christopher captive as he bathed before a tournament in Munich. Although Christopher renounced his claim for revenge, he lay in wait for Niclas in Freising. When the latter arrived, he was killed by Seitz von Frauenberg. He is buried in the former convent of Abensberg.

Abensberg then lost its independence and became a part of the Duchy of Bavaria, and from then on was administered by a ducal official, the so-called caretaker. The castle of Abensberg was destroyed during the Thirty Years' War, although the city had bought a guarantee of protection from the Swedish general, Carl Gustaf Wrangel. During the War of the Spanish Succession emperor Leopold I, who had occupied Bavaria, granted the fief of Abensberg to count Ernst von Abensperg und Traun (1608–1668) from an Austrian noble family named Traun that now received the name of the former counts of Abensberg (who were believed to be distant relatives). After the occupation ended, he was however dispossessed.

Johannes Aventinus (1477–1534) is the city's most famous son, the founder of the study of history in Bavaria. Aventinus, whose name was real name is Johann or Johannes Turmair (Aventinus being the Latin name of his birthplace) wrote the Annals of Bavaria, a valuable record of the early history of Germany and the first major written work on the subject. He is commemorated in the Walhalla temple, a monument near Regensburg to the distinguished figures of German history. Until 1800, Abensberg was a municipality belonging to the Straubing district of the Electorate of Bavaria. Abensberg also contained a magistrates' court. In the Battle of Abensberg on 19–20 April 1809, Napoleon gained a significant victory over the Austrians under Archduke Ludwig of Austria and General Johann von Hiller.

=== Coat of arms ===
Arms of Abensberg

The arms of the city are divided into two halves. On the left are the blue and white rhombuses of Bavaria, while the right half is split into two silver and black triangles. Two diagonally-crossed silver swords with golden handles rest on top.

The town has had a coat of arms since 1338, that of the Counts of Abensberg. With the death of the last Count, Nicholas of Abensberg, in 1485, the estates fell to the Duchy of Bavaria-Munich, meaning that henceforth only the Bavarian coat of arms was ever used.

On 31 December 1809, a decree of King Maximilian of Bavaria granted the city a new coat of arms, as a recognition of their (mainly humanitarian and logistic) services in the Battle of Abensberg the same year. The diagonally divided field in silver and black came from the old crest of the Counts of Abensberg, while the white and blue diamonds came from that of the House of Wittelsbach, the rulers of Bavaria. The swords recall the Battle of Abensberg.

The district of Offenstetten previously possessed its own coat of arms.

=== Twinning ===
- Parga, Greece since 1986
- Lonigo, Italy since 1999
- Saint-Gilles, Gard, France since 2016

== Economy and infrastructure ==
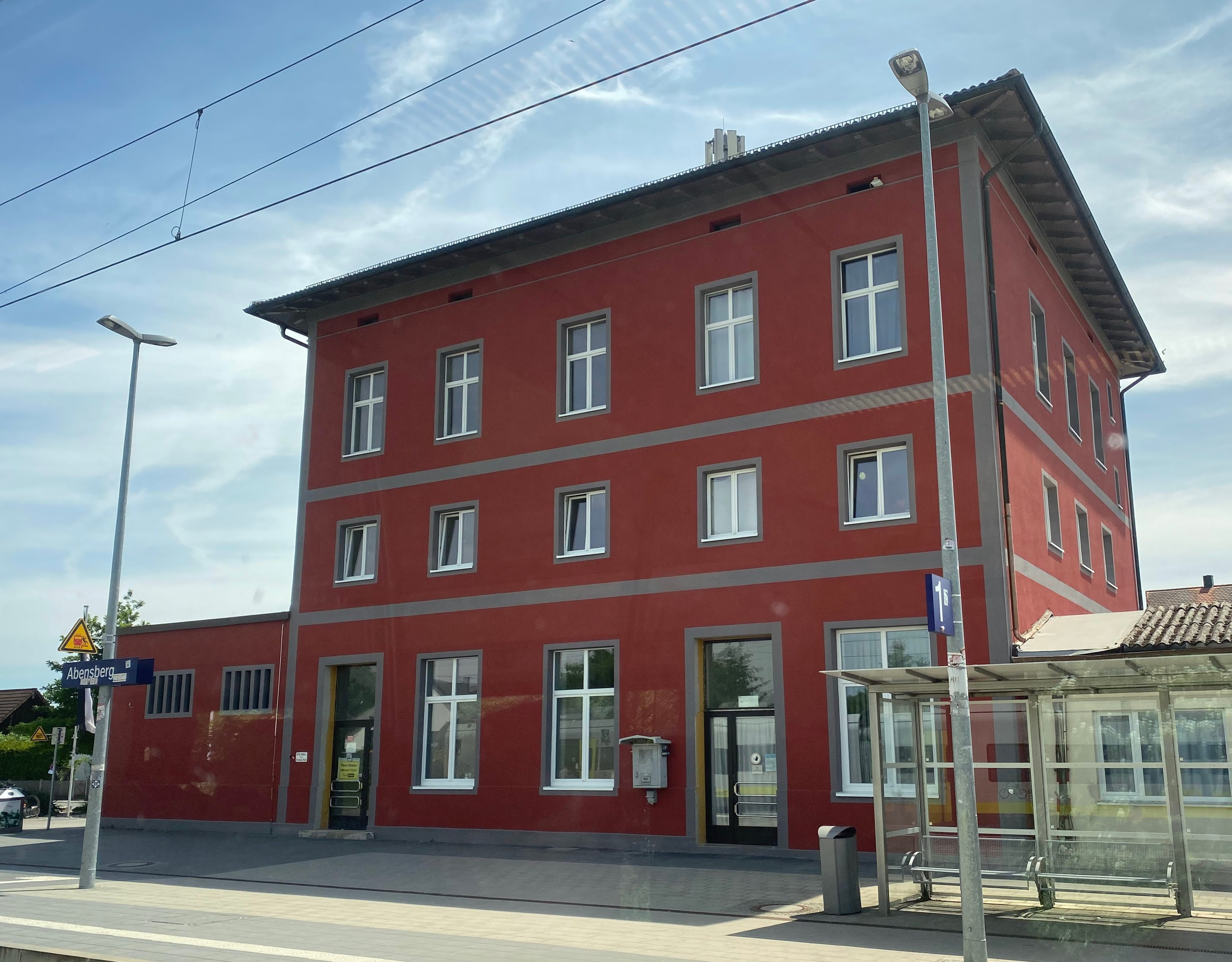
Abensberg railway station

The area around Abensberg, the so-called sand belt between Siegburg, Neustadt an der Donau, Abensberg and Langquaid, is used for the intensive farming of asparagus, due to the optimal soil condition and climate. Approximately 300 hectares are devoted to asparagus production. Abensberg asparagus enjoys a reputation among connoisseurs as a particular delicacy. In addition to asparagus, the production of hops plays a major role locally, the region having its own label, and there are still three independent breweries in the area. The town of Abensberg marks the start of the Deutsche Hopfenstraße (German Hops Road), a nickname given to the Bundesstraße 301, a German federal highway which runs through the heartland of Germany's hops-growing industry, ending in Freising.

=== Transport ===
The Abensberg railway station is located on the Regensburg–Ingolstadt railway from Regensburg to Ingolstadt. The city can be reached via the A-93 Holledau-Regensburg road (exit Abensberg). Three Bundesstraße (German federal highways) cross south of Abensberg: B 16, B 299 and B 301.

== Public facilities ==
=== Schools ===
Abensberg has two Grundschulen (primary school) and Mittelschule (open admission secondary school), and the Johann-Turmair-Realschule (secondary modern school). There is also a College of Agriculture and Home Economics. Since 2007, the Kelheim Berufsschule has had a campus in Abensberg, and outside the state sector is the St. Francis Vocational Training Centre, run by a Catholic youth organisation. In addition, there are two special schools, one near Abensberg, the other in the civil parish of Offenstetten.

== Culture and sightseeing ==
=== Theatre ===
In 2008, a former goods shed by the main railway station of Abensberg was converted into a theatre by local volunteers. The "Theater am Bahnhof" (Theatre at the Railway Station) is mostly used by the Theatergruppe Lampenfieber and was opened on 19 October 2008.

=== Museums ===
Abensberg has a long tradition of museums. In the nineteenth century, Nicholas Stark und Peter Paul Dollinger began a collection based on local history. This collection and the collection of the Heimatverein (local history society) were united in 1963 into the Aventinus Museum, in the cloister of the former Carmelite monastery. On 7 July 2006, the new Town Museum of Abensberg was opened in the former duke's castle in the town.

=== Kuchlbauer Brewery ===
Two blocks west of the Old Town is the Kuchlbauer Brewery and beer garden featuring the Kuchlbauer Tower, a colorful and unconventional observation tower designed by Viennese architect Friedensreich Hundertwasser. The brewery and tower are open to the public.

=== Image gallery ===
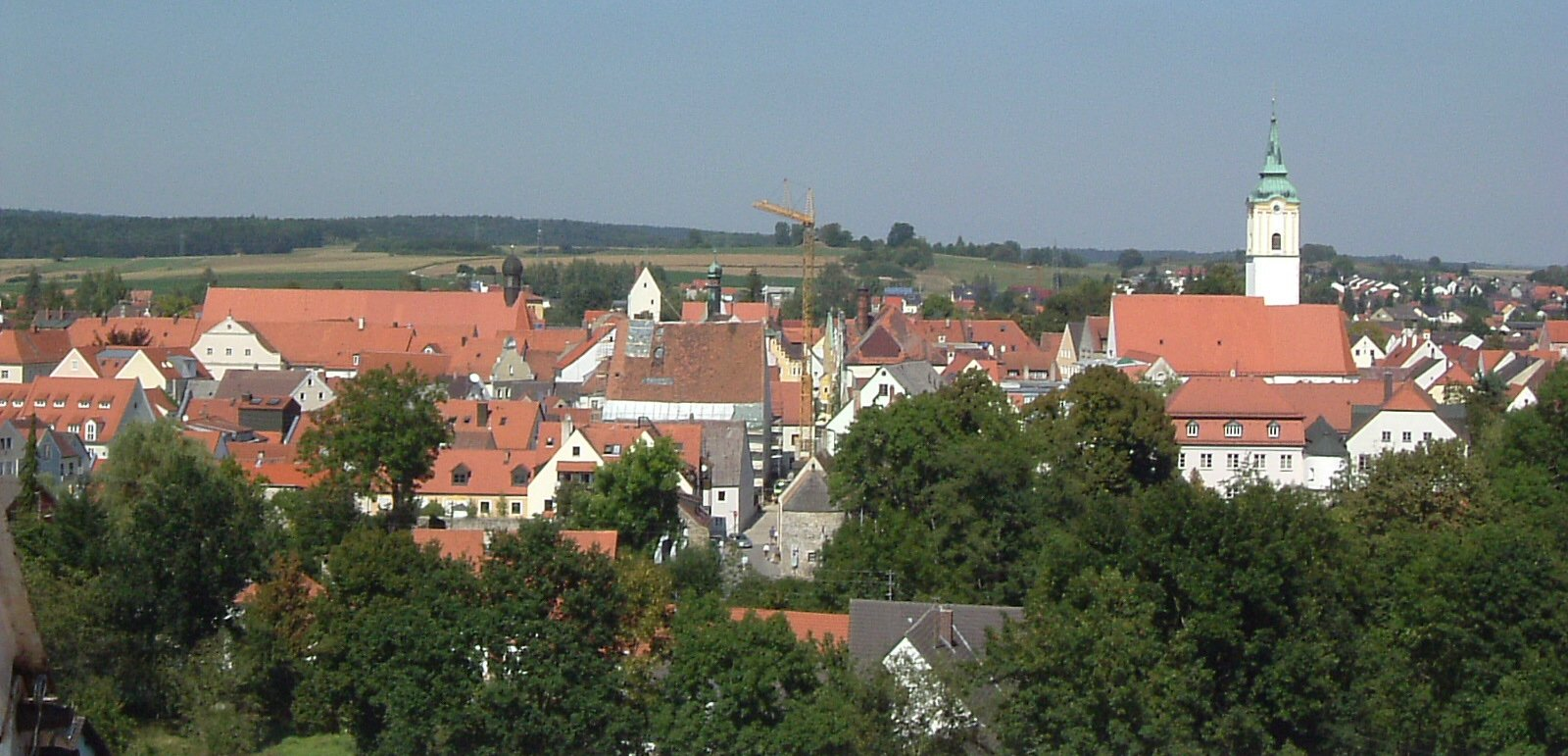
View of the Old Town

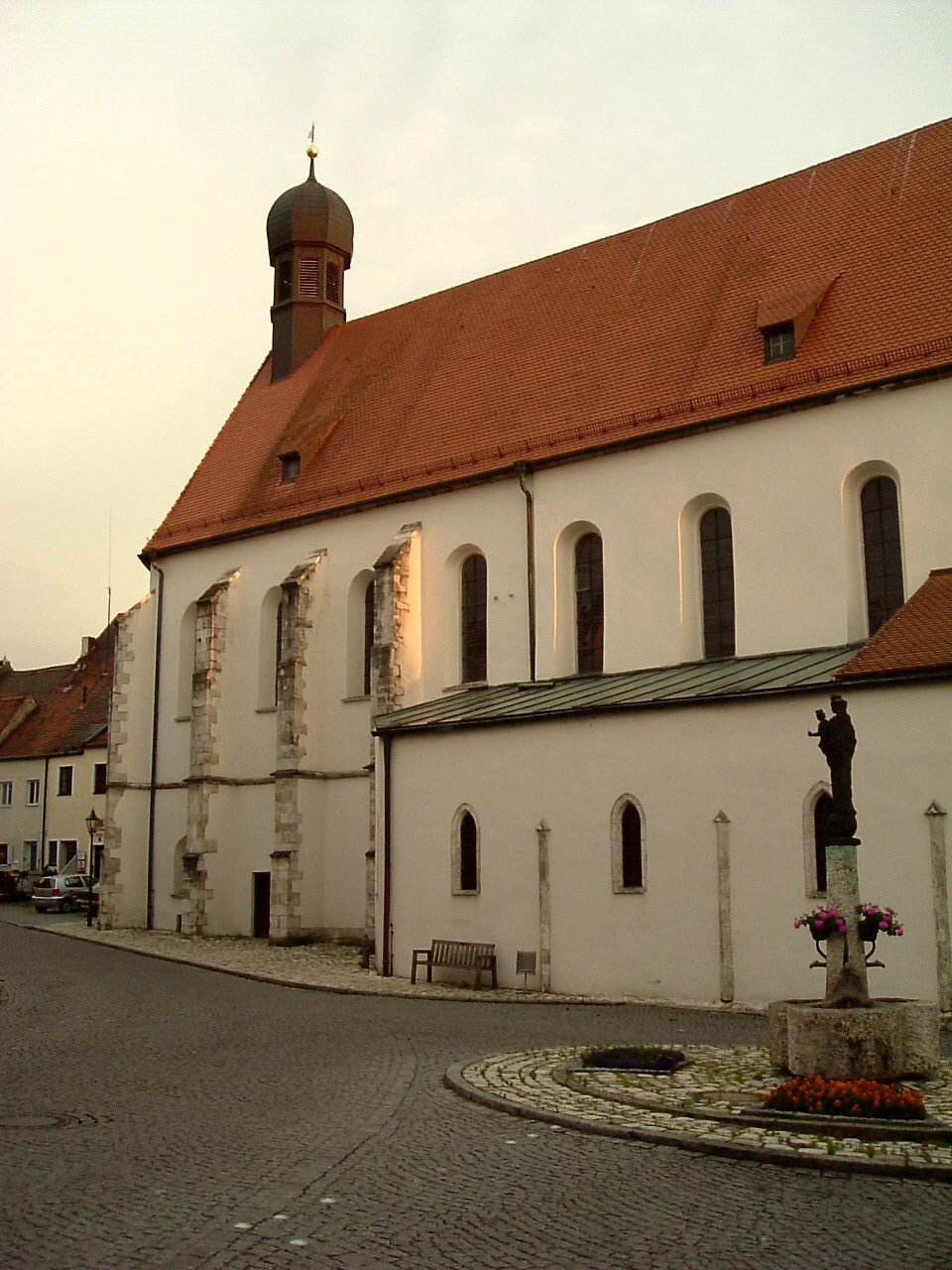
Carmelite Monastery

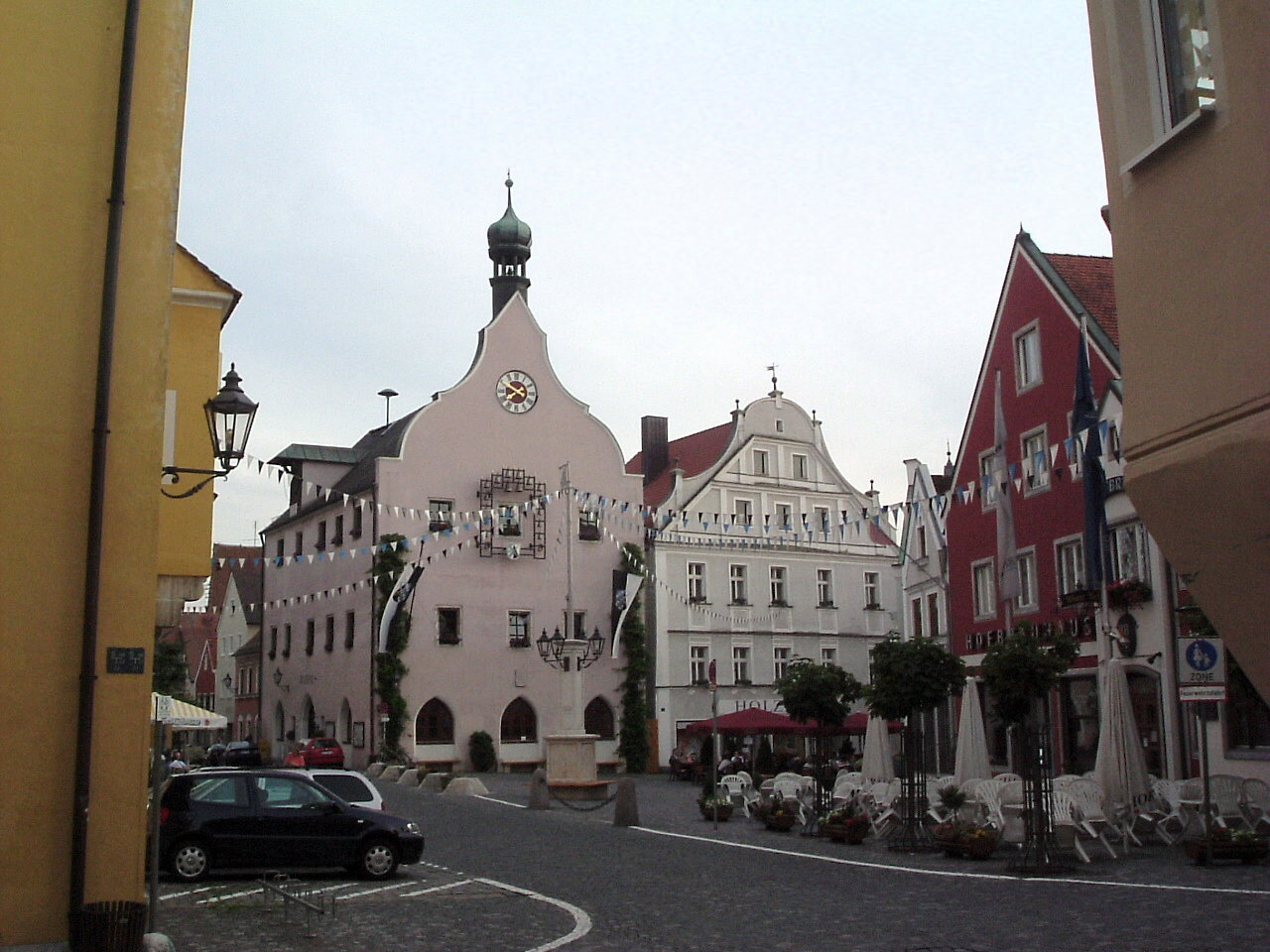
Town Centre with Rathaus (town hall)

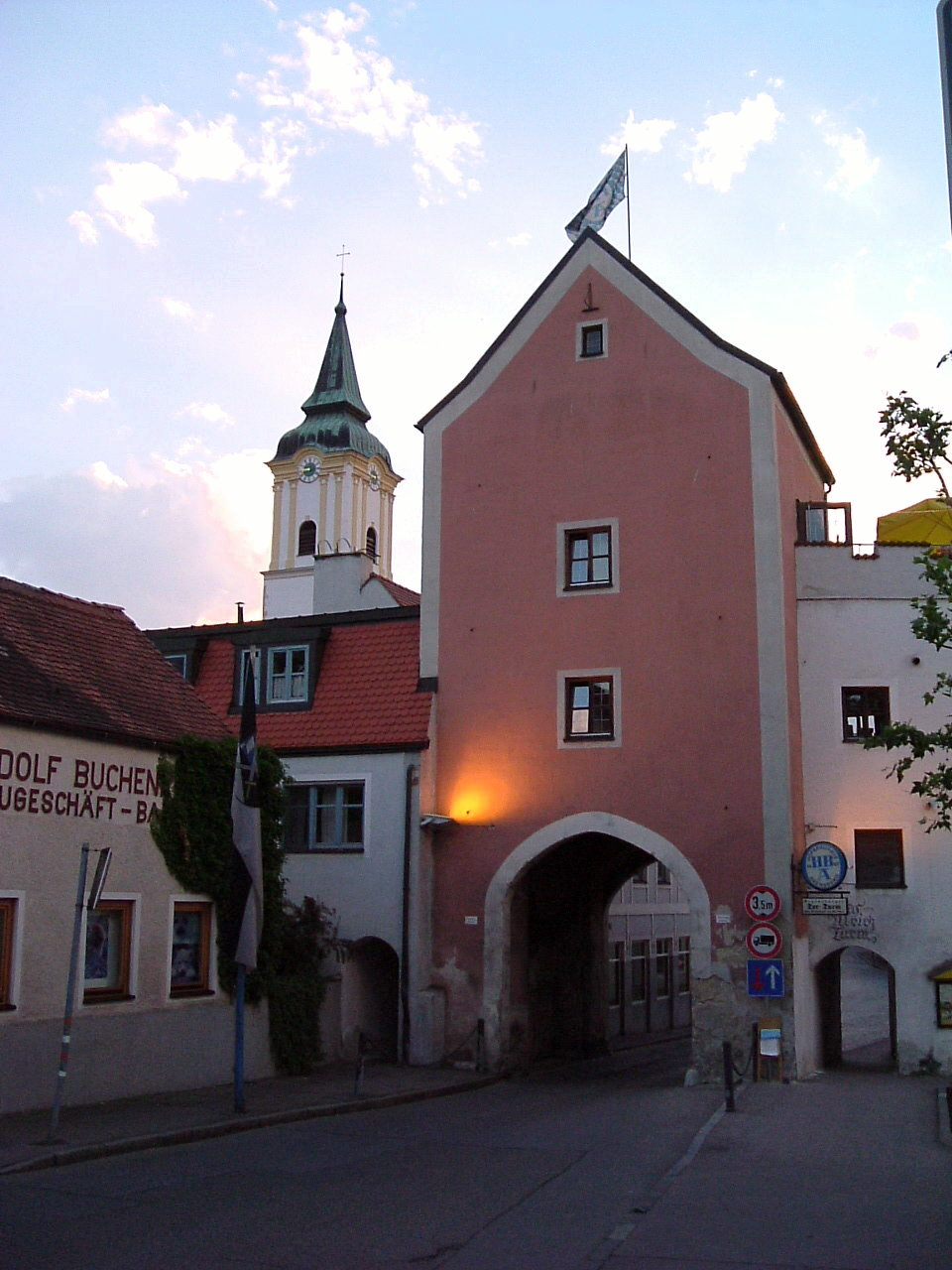
Regensburg Gate

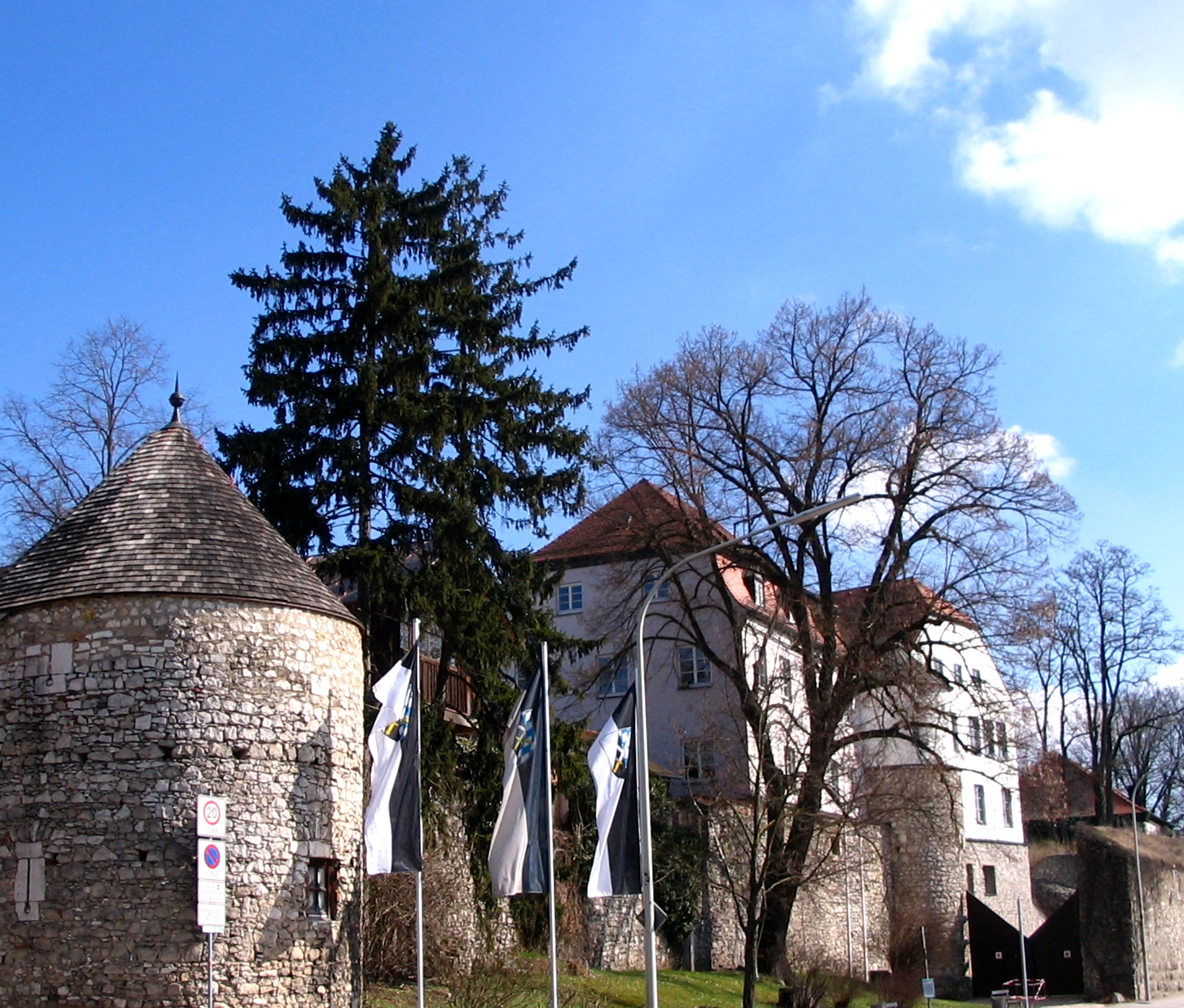
Site of the former castle

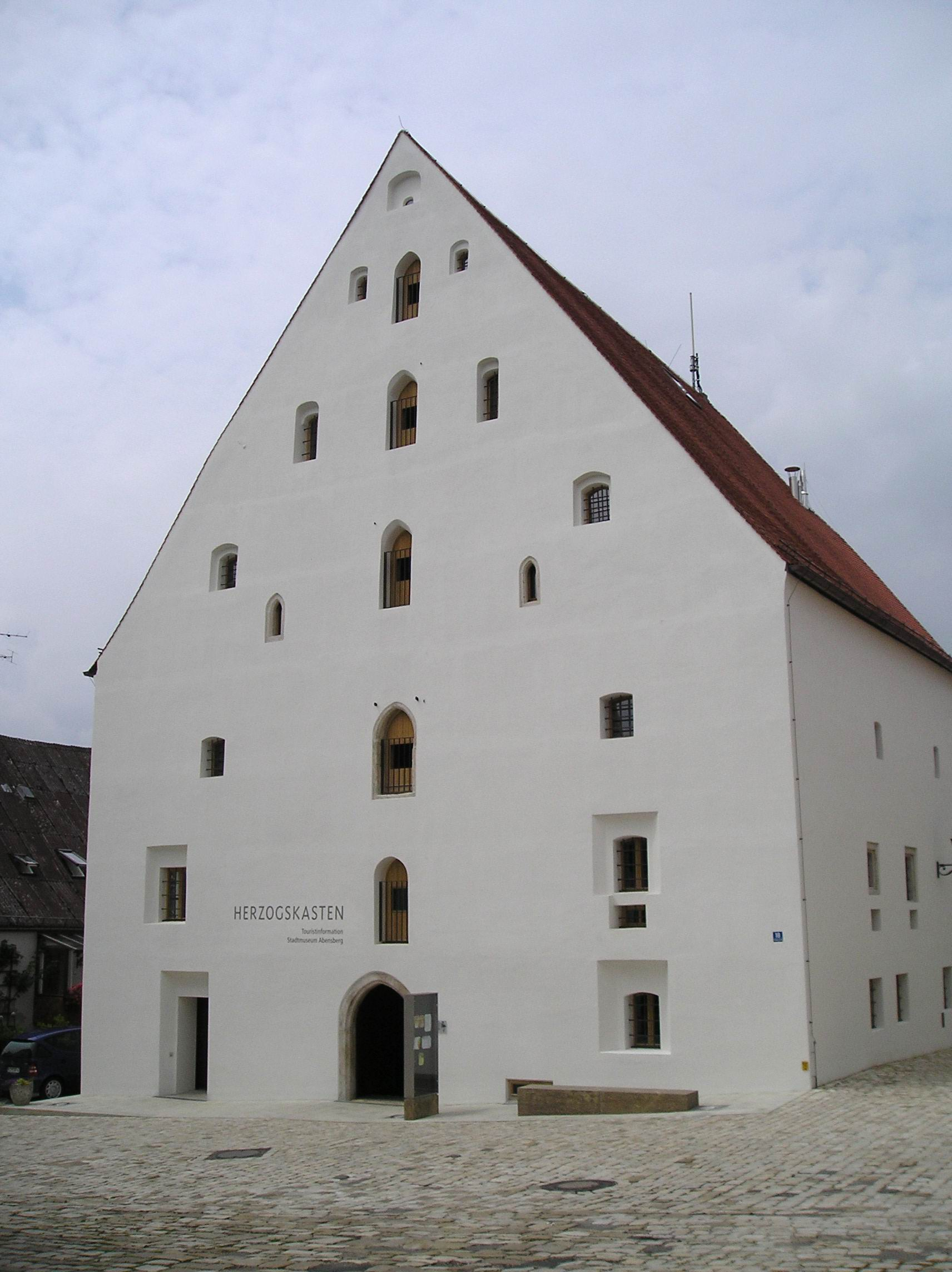
Herzogskasten (Duke's storage house)

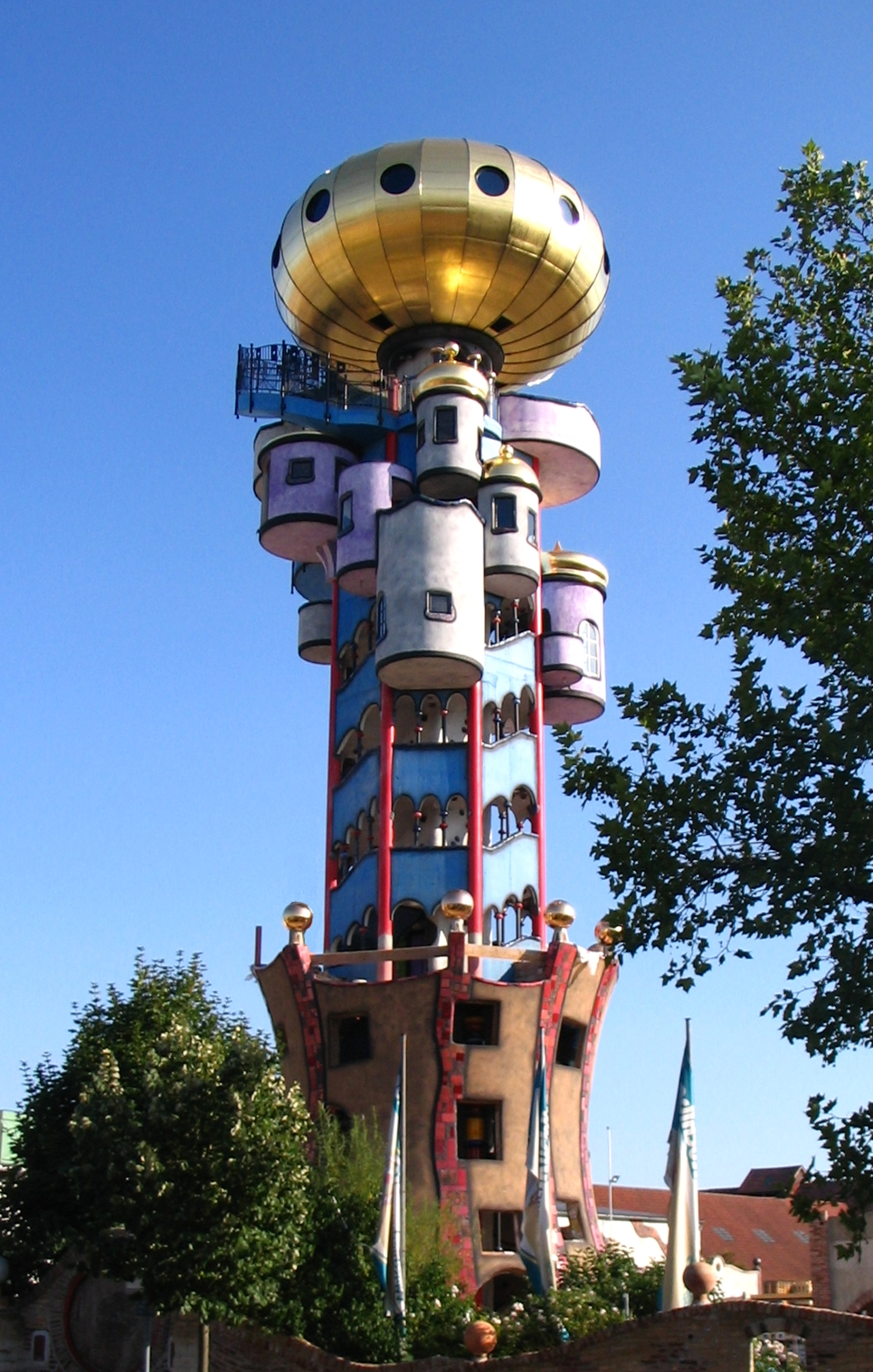
Kuchlbauer Tower

=== Missing memorial ===
Up until the 1950s, Abensberg and the surrounding villages contained a number of graves of victims of a Death March in the spring of 1945 from the Hersbruck sub-camp of the Dachau concentration camp, who were either murdered by the SS or died of exhaustion. They were originally buried where they died, but were later moved on the orders of the US military government to the cemeteries of their previous homes. At the cemetery in what is now the district of Pullach stood a memorial stone which was mentioned as recently as 1967, but which is no longer at the site. The suffering of ten unknown victims of the camp was recorded on the stone.

=== Regular events ===
- The Abensberger events calendar begins in February with the Faschingsgillamoos funfair, which reaches its high point on Mad Thursday.
- There then follows the Frühjahrsmarkt (Spring market) two weeks before Easter, when all the shops in the town are permitted to open on Sunday (which is normally prohibited in Germany).
- The Bürgerfest is celebrated on the first weekend of July, when the palace gardens with their ancient walls are transformed into a medieval camp.
- The Schlossgartenfest (Palace Garden Festival) takes place every year at the beginning of August. It is organised since 1977 by the Junge Union, the youth branch of Germany's two main conservative political parties, the CDU and CSU, and attracts all age groups from Abensberg and surrounding areas.
- On the second Saturday in August, people can wander through the Night Market in the balmy Summer evening.
- The Gillamoos, the oldest and largest funfair in the Hallertau opens on the Thursday before the first Sunday in September and runs until the Monday thereafter. It is the highlight of the year in Abensberg and is a celebration of the people of Abensberg and the surrounding area.
- The Herbstmarkt (autumn market), another Sunday shopping day, is on the first weekend in October.
- Since 1997, a series of cultural, art, music and entertainment events have taken place in November at various locations in the town, under the title, Novembernebel (November fog)
- On Saint Nicholas Day (6 December), the Niklasmarkt (Nicholas Market) commemorates the Niklasspende, a medieval foundation for the poor. This heralds the beginning of Advent and the Christmas period.

== Sport ==
=== Speedway and football ===
The Wack Hofmeister Stadium, formerly the Altes Stadion Abensberg (the Old Stadium) is a motorcycle speedway and association football stadium located slightly east of the centre of Abensberg in Germany. It hosts the speedway team MSC Abensberg and the football team TSV Abensberg 1862.

== Notable residents ==
=== Sons and daughters of the town ===
- Johannes Aventinus (1477–1534): Bavarian historian
- Stephan Agricola (1491–1547): Lutheran reformer
- Joseph von Hazzi (1768–1845): Bavarian Privy Councillor
- Josef Hofmeister (born 1934): Speedway rider
- Uwe Brandl (born 1959): Mayor of Abensberg
- Paul Smaczny: Music and film producer
- Christian Lohr: Musician and producer
- Stephan Ebn (born 1978): drummer and music producer
- Richard Resch: Tenor, classical and opera singer

=== People who have worked in the town ===
- Wiguläus von Kreittmayr (1705–1790): by marriage Lord of Offenstetten and Hatzkofen
- Friedensreich Hundertwasser (1928–2000): artist and architect
- Radu Ivan (born 1969): International Judo champion
- Ole Bischof (born 1979): Olympic Judo champion

== See also ==
- Battle of Abensberg occurred April 20, 1809.
- Battle of Landshut occurred April 21, 1809.
- Battle of Eckmühl occurred 21–22 April 1809.
- Eckmühl
- Landshut
