= Levallois Sporting Club =

French sporting club

- Full name: Levallois Sporting Club
- Founded: 1983
- Stadium: Stade Didier Drogba
- Chairman: Jean-Pierre Aubry
- Website: levallois-sporting-club.com

The Levallois Sporting Club is a multi-sport athletic club located in Levallois-Perret, France. Founded in 1983, it is now organised into 32 sports and counts 14,500 members. It is one of the most important sports club in France and one that links amateurs and professionals. Among the notable members of the club are Teddy Riner, Marie-Claire Restoux and Jean-Philippe Gatien.

== History ==
The Levallois Sporting Club was created in 1983. Before that, the club was called Entente Sportive Levalloisienne. At first, 12 sports were represented. By the way of its first president Patrick Balkany, the club grew quickly into a professional club. In 1988, eight Levalloisiens were selected for the Seoul Olympics. At this event, Frédéric Delpla, a fencer, became the first olympic champion of the club. Nowadays, the club is one of the most important in France with 14 500 members and a string of well-known sportsmen like Teddy Riner or Maureen Nisima.

== Chairmen ==
- Jean-Pierre Aubry (since 2008)
- Jean-François Rouziès (2002-2008)
- Rolland Mallo (1999-2002)
- Jean-Michel Hautefort (1995-1999)
- Jean-Pierre Bastide (1989-1995)
- Patrick Balkany (1983-1989)

== Sections ==
- Aikido
- Athletics
- Badminton
- Basketball
- Basque pelota
- Bicycle touring
- Boxing
- Cross country
- Dancing
- Climbing
- Fencing
- Football
- Golf
- Fitness
- Gymnastics
- Handball
- Judo
- Karate
- Kickboxing
- Lifeguard
- Pétanque
- Physical culture
- Sailing
- Savate
- Swimming
- Table tennis
- Tennis / Squash
- Trampoline
- Triathlon
- Underwater diving
- Volleyball
- Wrestling-Grappling
- Weight training

The club's former basketball section merged with Paris Basket Racing in 2007 to form Paris-Levallois Basket, which in turn renamed itself Levallois Metropolitans in 2017 and Metropolitans 92 in 2019.

== Achievements ==
Since 1983, the Levallois Sporting Club has won 24 Olympic medals, 146 world championships medals and 130 European championships medals. Its most famous discipline are fencing, judo and table tennis.
