= Levallois SC =

French football club

Levallois Sporting Club Football
- Founded: 1894
- Ground: Stade Didier Drogba
- Capacity: 1,500
- Chairman: François Lachaussee
- Website: levallois-sporting-club.com

Levallois Sporting Club Football is a French football club founded in 1894. They are based in Levallois-Perret, France. Former Chelsea striker Didier Drogba played youth football with Levallois and they have named their new Stadium after Didier Drogba. It is affiliated to the Levallois Sporting Club.

== Football ==
Former Chelsea striker Didier Drogba played youth football with Levallois and they have named their new Stadium after Didier Drogba.

From 2002 to 2006, the club played at the fifth level of French football, the Championnat de France Amateurs 2 and were promoted after finishing third in their group.

Levallois reached the 1/16-finals of the 2000–01 Coupe de France, losing 0–1 to ES Wasquehal.

The club ceased playing senior football in 2009, merging its senior team into that of Racing Club de France Football.

== See also ==
- Levallois Sporting Club
