= Christophe Brunet =

French judoka (born 1967)

Christophe Brunet (born 28 March 1967) is a French judoka.

== Achievements ==
Year	Tournament	Place	Weight class
1995	European Judo Championships	7th	Half lightweight (65 kg)

== See also ==
- History of martial arts
- Judo in France
- List of judoka
- Timeline of martial arts
