= European Club Championships (Judo) =

The European Club Championships is the judo club team championship of the European Judo Union.

It is divided into the following leagues:

- Champions League (since 1976)
- Europa League (since 2014)
