= Bertrand Amoussou-Guenou =

French mixed martial artist and judoka (born 1966)

- Born: May 29, 1966 (age 60); Dakar, Senegal
- Other names: Iron-B
- Nationality: French
- Height: 5 ft 10 in (1.78 m)
- Weight: 198 lb (90 kg; 14 st 2 lb)
- Style: MMA, Judo, Karate, Kickboxing
- Stance: Orthodox
- Fighting out of: Créteil, France
- Rank: black belt in Judo
- Years active: 1995 - 2004

Mixed martial arts record
- Total: 2
- Wins: 1
- By knockout: 1
- Losses: 1
- By submission: 1

Other information
- Notable relatives: Karl Amoussou, brother
- Mixed martial arts record from Sherdog

Bertrand Amoussou-Guenou (born May 29, 1966) is a retired French mixed martial artist and judoka. He is a trainer for his younger brother Karl of Team Amoussou and, following official recognition of mixed martial arts in France, became the president of the national sanctioning body, the Commission National de Mixed Martial Arts, in January 2008. On 1 October 2013, Amoussou assumed the position of president of the International Mixed Martial Arts Federation (IMMAF).

== Life and career ==
Amoussou was born in Dakar, Senegal to a Beninese instructor of judo and karate. At the age of four he moved to France and began his training in judo in January 1977.

Amoussou was a national champion in judo and, as a member of the French national team for ten years, became the bronze medalist (78 kg) at the 1990 European Judo Championships. Amoussou became three-time world champion in Ju-Jitsu Combat (practically an amalgamation of judo and karate) and also trained kickboxing with French full contact karateka Dominique Valera.

In 2004, Amoussou became the first Frenchman to win a Pride Fighting Championship bout. He also served as an ambassador for ju-jitsu at the 2010 SportAccord Combat Games in Beijing.

In 2008 Amoussou became the president of the national sanctioning body, the Commission National de Mixed Martial Arts, which was later to change its name to the Commission Française de Mixed Martial Arts. In October 2013, he ascended to the role of president of the International Mixed Martial Arts Federation (IMMAF) and oversaw the first IMMAF World Championships of Amateur MMA in Las Vegas (USA) in June - July 2014.

== Mixed martial arts record ==
Professional record breakdown
2 matches	1 win	1 loss
By knockout	1	0
By submission	0	1

Res.	Record	Opponent	Method	Event	Date	Round	Time	Location	Notes
Win	1-0-1	(Japan) Rao Rao	TKO (punches)	Pride Bushido 3	May 23, 2004	2	0:29	Yokohama, Kanagawa, Japan	
Loss	0-0-1	(Australia) Mushtaq Abdullah	Submission (rear naked choke)	Brazil Open - '95	December 1, 1995	1	2:33	Brazil	
