= Waltz (music) =

Musical style written in 3/4 time

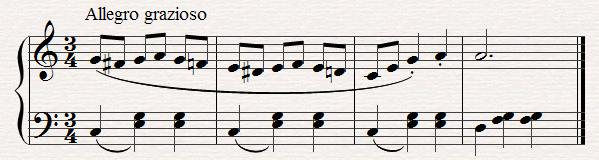
A section from Johann Strauss' Waltz from Die Fledermaus

A waltz, (Note: German: Walzer; French: Valse, Italian: Valzer, Spanish: Vals, Polish: Walc) probably deriving from German Ländler, is dance music in triple metre, often written in 3/4 time. A waltz typically sounds one chord per measure, and the accompaniment style particularly associated with the waltz is (as seen in the example to the right) to play the root of the chord on the first beat, the upper notes on the second and third beats. It can be thought of as "oom-pa-pa", a common example to make the first beat heavier in the waltz. It falls into about an 84 to 108 BPM.

== History and examples ==
The name waltz comes from the German verb walzen, meaning "to revolve." Although French writers have attempted to connect the waltz to the 16th century volta, firm evidence is lacking connecting this Italian form to the earliest occurrence in the mid‑18th century of walzen to describe dancing. The waltz style quickly became a style of grace and elegance; therefore, many Classical and Romantic period composers were interested in using it.

Classical composers traditionally supplied music for dancing when required, and Franz Schubert's waltzes (including the Valses Sentimentales and Valses Nobles) were written for household dancing, without any pretence at being art music. However, Frédéric Chopin's surviving 18 waltzes (five he wrote as a child), along with his mazurkas and polonaises, were clearly not intended for dance. They marked the adoption of the waltz and other dance forms as serious composition genres.

Other notable contributions to the waltz genre in classical music include 16 by Johannes Brahms (originally for piano duet), and Maurice Ravel's Valses nobles et sentimentales for piano and La valse for orchestra. "The Blue Danube" by Johann Strauss II remains the most famous waltz ever composed.

Other examples of popular waltzes include "Invitation to the Dance" by Weber, "Un bal" by Berlioz, "The Skater's Waltz" by Waldteufel, "Sobre las Olas" by Rosas, "Waltz of the Flowers" by Tchaikovsky, "Waves of the Danube" by Ivanovici, and Shostakovich's Waltz No. 2. 32nd Sultan of the Ottoman Empire, Sultan Abdulaziz, also composed a waltz named "Invitation to Waltz".

J. Brahms' piano duet

The long period of the waltz's popularity was brought to an end by the First World War, which destroyed the Austro-Hungarian monarchy and the Viennese culture which had nurtured it for so long. European light music shifted from Vienna to Berlin, and compositions by composers such as Gustav Mahler, Igor Stravinsky, and William Walton treated the dance in a nostalgic or grotesque manner as a thing of the past. Waltzes nevertheless continued to be written by composers of light music, such as Eric Coates, Robert Stolz, Ivor Novello, Richard Rodgers, Cole Porter, Oscar Straus, and Stephen Sondheim. The Australian composer Julian Cochran composed piano and orchestral works using the French title Valses, closer to the Latin origin, to mitigate assumptions of a Viennese style. The predominant ballroom form in the 20th century has become the slow waltz, which rose to popularity around 1910 and was derived from the Valse Boston of the 1870s. Examples derived from popular songs include "Ramona" (1927), "Parlami d'amore Mariù" (1932), and "The Last Waltz" (1970).

== Jazz waltzes ==
In a jazz context, "waltz" signifies any piece of music in 3/4 time, whether intended for dancing or not. Although there are early examples such as the "Missouri Waltz" by Dan and Harvey's Jazz Band (1918) and the "Jug Band Waltz" or the "Mississippi Waltz" by the Memphis Jug Band (1928), they are exceptional, as almost all jazz before 1955 was in duple meter. It was in 1938 that noted jazz-influenced classical composer Dmitri Shostakovich wrote the Jazz Suite in 3/4 time. It was only shortly after the "bop waltz" appeared in the early 1950s (e.g., Thelonious Monk’s recording of Carolina Moon in 1952 and Sonny Rollins’s Valse Hot in 1956) that triple meter became at all common in jazz.

== Popular songs today with 3/4 style ==
Today, waltzes are still commonly seen in contemporary music. Some examples include Billy Joel's "Piano Man", Kelly Clarkson's "Cry", "Happy X-Mas" by John Lennon, "Nothing Else Matters" by Metallica, and Adele's "First Love."

== See also ==
- Austrian folk dancing
- Ländler
- Schuhplattler
- Triple Step
- Waltz (dance)
- Zwiefacher
