= Lederhosen =

Austrian/Bavarian leather trousers

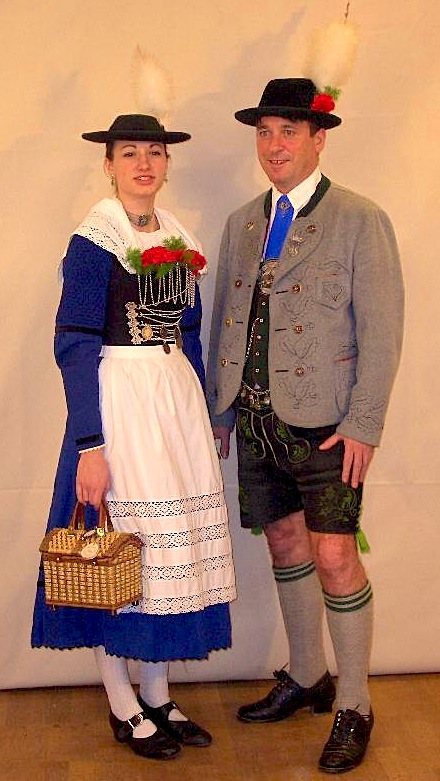
A couple wearing Miesbacher Tracht: The man is wearing traditional Bavarian lederhosen.

The term Lederhosen (/ˈleɪdərˌhoʊzən/; German pronunciation: [ˈleːdɐˌhoːzn̩], singular in German usage: Lederhose, German: [ˈleːdɐˌhoːzə]; lit. 'Leather Pants') is used in English to refer specifically to the traditional leather breeches worn by men in Southern Germany (specifically in Bavaria and Swabia), Austria, South Tyrol and Slovenia (where they are most commonly called irharice). The term Trachten-Lederhose is often used in German to avoid confusion with other types of leather pants. The longer trousers are generally called Bundhosen.

== History ==
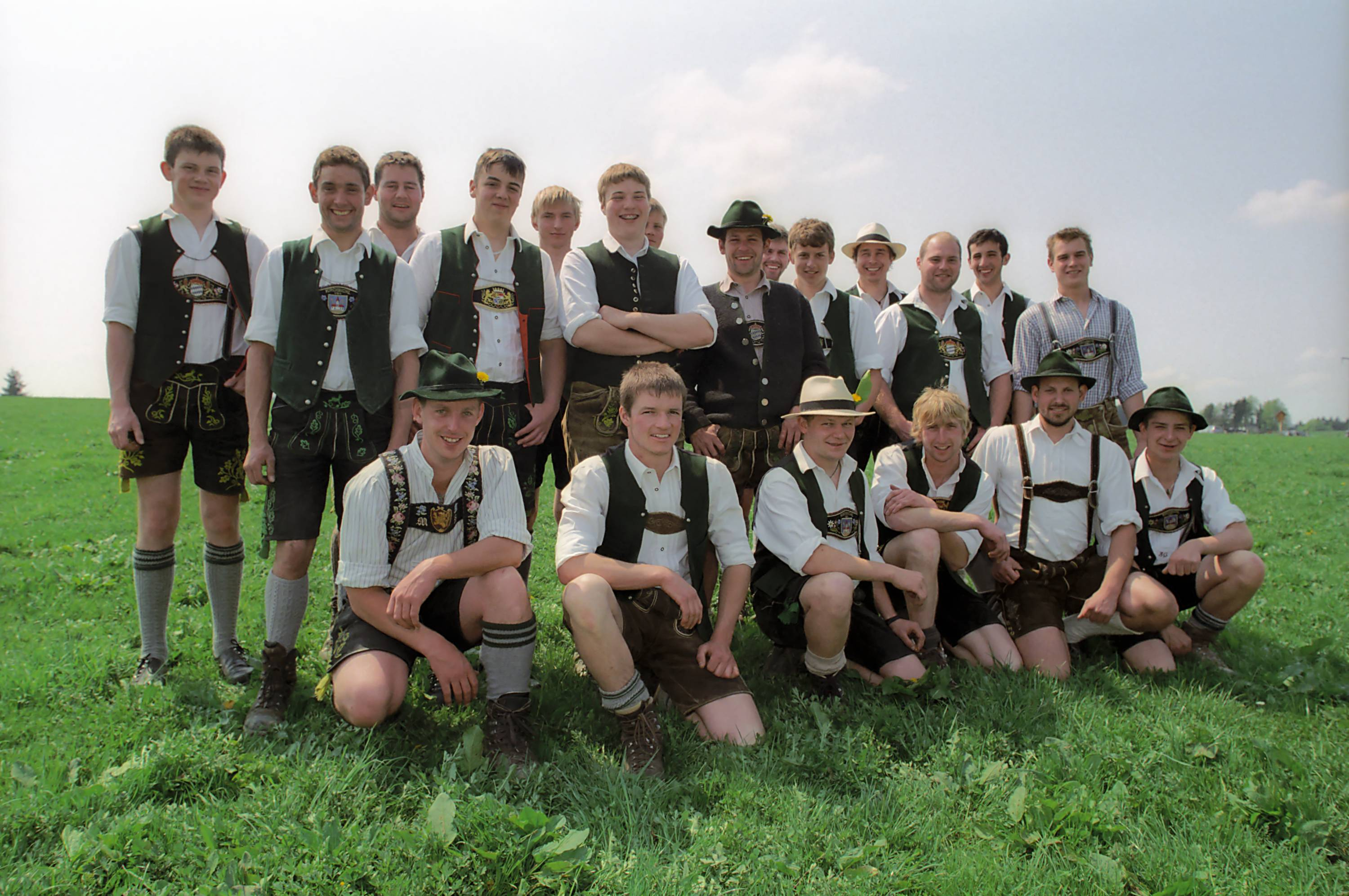
Bavarian men wearing short lederhosen

Lederhosen probably originated during the late Middle Ages. They were worn for hard physical work, as they were more durable than fabric garments. Today, they are mostly worn as leisurewear. Lederhosen and dirndl attire are also common at Oktoberfest events around the world.

La Couturière Parisienne stated that lederhosen were originally not exclusively Bavarian garments, but were worn all over Europe, especially by riders, hunters, and other people involved in outdoor activities. The flap (drop front), though, may have been a unique Bavarian invention. The drop-front style became so popular in the 18th century that it was known in France as à la bavaroise, "in the Bavarian style".

While there are Lederhosen that go past the knee, these were mostly worn for special occasions; the everyday form of Lederhosen in the Austrian and Bavarian Alps were cut above the knee. Workers and hunters alike preferred the added mobility, especially in the steep slopes of the Eastern Alps. While the exact origin of this cut is uncertain, the first written account of its use was made by August Lewald during his tour of Tuxertal, Tyrol, Austria in 1835.

While the popularity of lederhosen remained constant in the depths of the Eastern Alps, their everyday use steadily declined along the outer edges of the mountain range. In 1883, school teacher Joseph Vogl established the Association for the Preservation of the National Costume in the Leitzach Valley and in the Upper Bavarian town of Bayrischzell to preserve this Alpine tradition. This association became the model for other preservation clubs known as Trachtenvereine, which spread across the outer edges of the Eastern Alps; from Munich to Salzburg and to Vienna. In Bavaria, the efforts to preserve traditional clothing and bolster a Bavarian identity were endorsed by the ruling class. King Ludwig II supported the creation of Trachtenvereine, and King Ludwig III famously wore lederhosen on trips to the Alps to show support for their preservation.

Lederhosen are also part of the traditional costume of Swabia and its former portion of the Black Forest in present-day Baden-Württemberg, but the lederhosen in these areas were always worn below the knee and never in the short style common in Bavaria. These knee-length Bundhosen are cuffed at the bottom, also unlike their Bavarian counterparts. While plaid shirts were worn with Swabian lederhosen at times, they are historically more commonly worn with a white linen shirt and colorful vest, most commonly red. Also unique to the region is the color of the lederhosen. In contrast to brown, most Swabians, including farmers, wore black, while the region's winemakers wore yellow. These lederhosen also have a decorative motif that is unique to the region. Today, lederhosen and so-called traditional costumes are worn mainly for local festivals and partially designed according to modern fashion trends.

== Variations ==
- Decorative Seams: There are 3, 5, 7, and even 9-seam lederhosen, depending on the number of stitched designs along the side trouser seam and at the front of the bib.
- Cuff: The side seams of lederhosen are either tied or buttoned together at the cuff
- Inseam: The lederhosen are held together by either a vertical seam or a horizontal seam known as a Tellernaht
- Color: Traditionally, the lederhose would either be black or brown

== See also ==
- Austrian folk dancing
- National costume
- Schuhplattler
- Trousers
