= Dirndl =

Traditional dress worn in parts of Alps

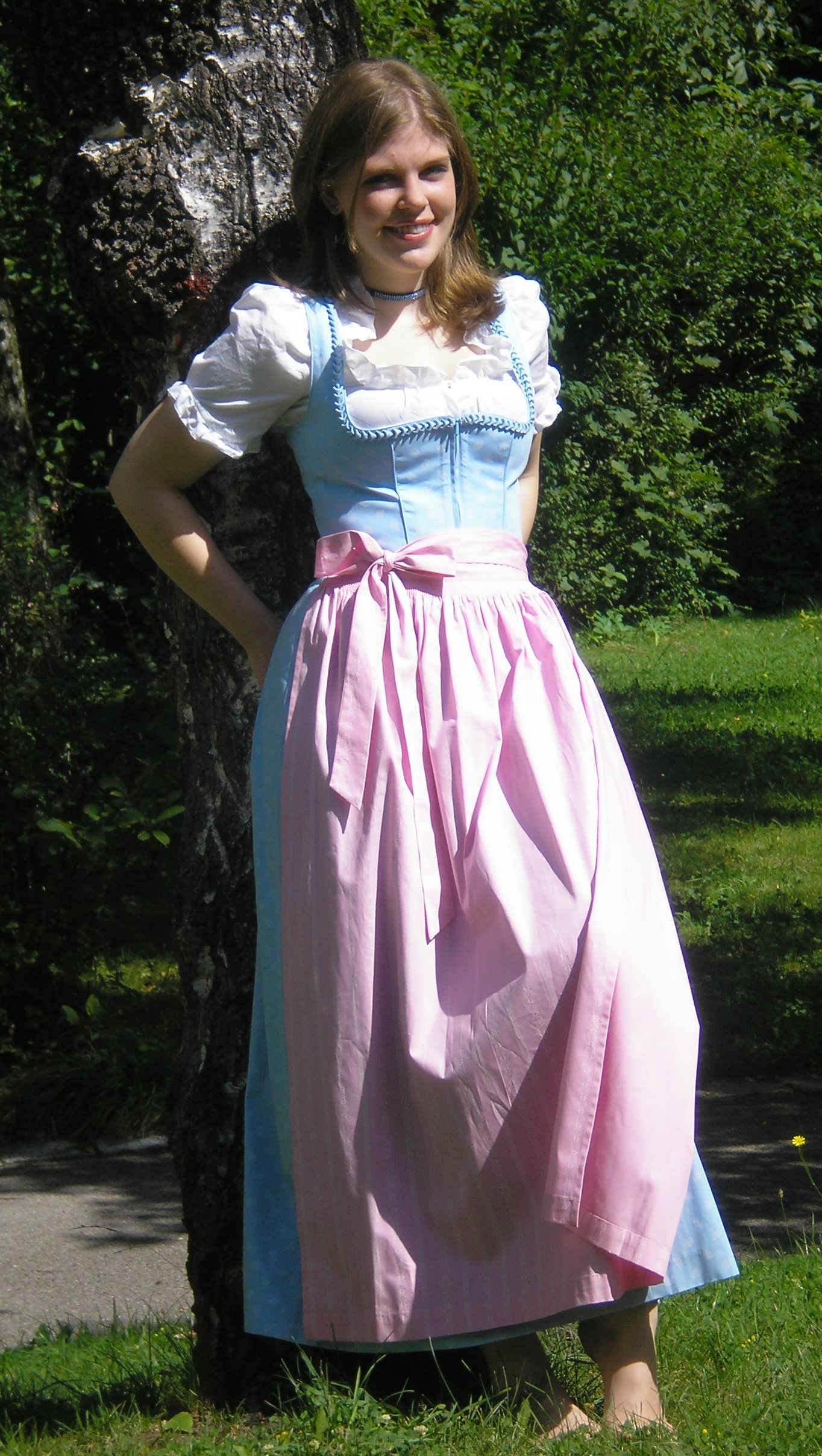
Woman wearing modern dirndl with long skirt

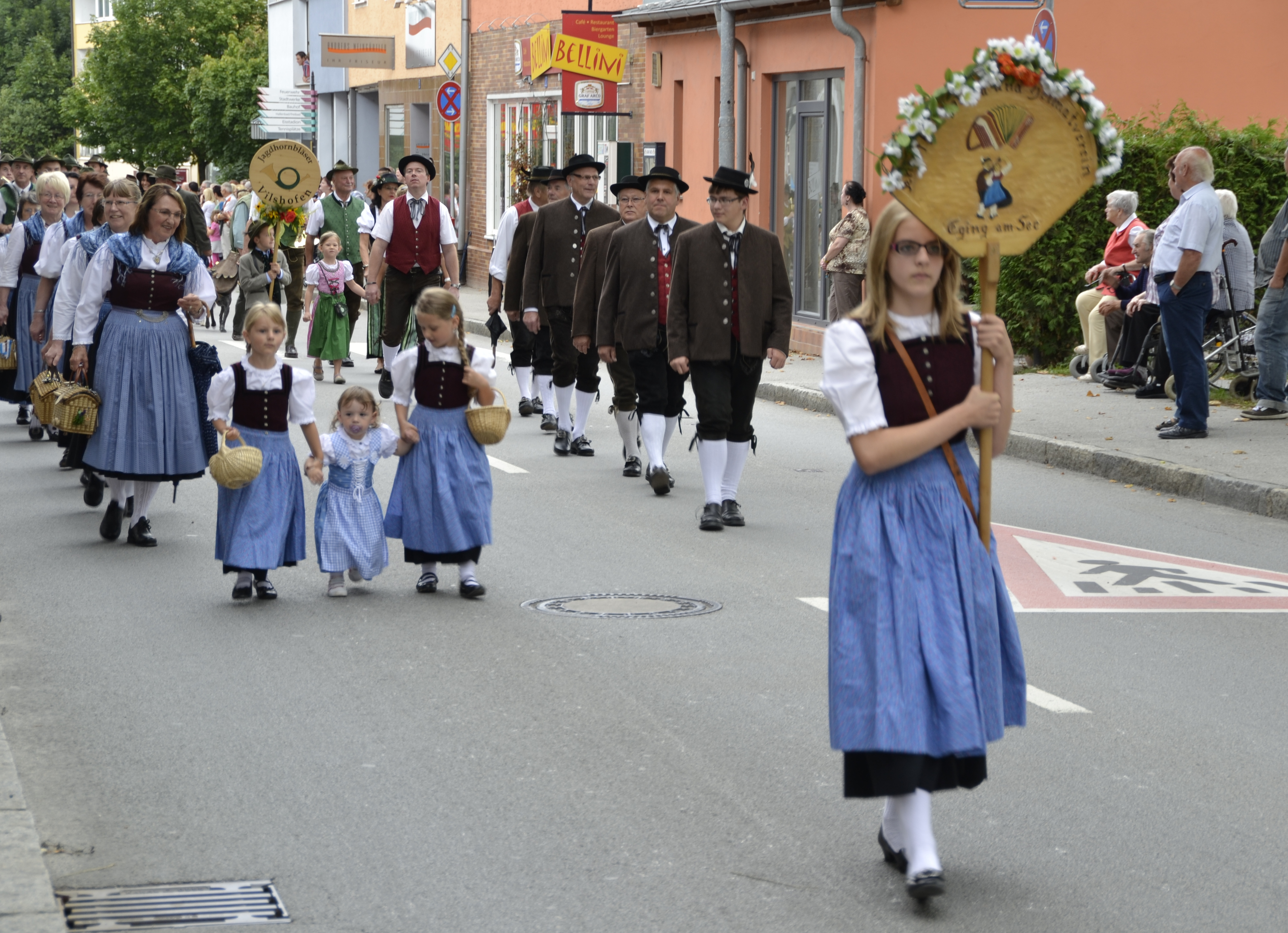
Children wearing traditional dirndls at a folk festival in Vilshofen an der Donau (Bavaria), 2012

A dirndl (German: [ˈdɪʁndl̩]) is a dress which originated in German-speaking areas of the Alps. It is traditionally worn by women and girls in some Alpine regions of Austria, Germany, Italy, Liechtenstein and Switzerland. A modern dirndl consists of a close-fitting bodice with a low neckline, a blouse worn under the bodice, a wide high-waisted skirt and an apron.

The dirndl is regarded as a folk costume (in German Tracht). Today it is generally considered traditional dress for women and girls in German-speaking parts of the Alps, with particular designs associated with different regions. The usual masculine tracht counterpart of the dirndl is lederhosen.

In the late 19th century the dirndl was adapted as a fashion mode by the upper and middle classes, and subsequently spread as a mode outside its area of origin. There are many varieties of adaptations from the original folk designs. The dirndl is also worn as an ethnic costume by German diaspora populations in other countries.

== Name ==
Dirndl is a diminutive of Dirn(e), originally meaning "young woman". (Note: In modern Standard German usage, Dirne generally signifies "prostitute", through previous use as a euphemism.) In Bavaria and Austria, Dirndl can mean a young woman, a girlfriend or the dress. The dress can for clarity be called Dirndlkleid (literally 'young woman's dress') or Dirndlgewand ('young woman's clothing'). Dirne is the form of the word in Standard German. In the Bavarian and Austrian varieties of German, the word is interchangeably Dirndl or Diandl.

Speakers of German have conflicting opinions as to whether the name Dirndl can be used for traditional as well as modern designs. Some speakers make a sharp break between traditional folk costume (Tracht) and the "Dirndl", a word which they use only for modern designs. For instance, Tracht scholar Thekla Weissengruber distinguishes between renewed Tracht (based closely upon historical designs) and Trachtenbekleidung (tracht clothing), including dirndls and lederhosen. She says: "In this category the designs in general keep to patterns which go back to the historical costume models; only the materials, skirt lengths and colour compositions change from season to season and correspond to the trends coming from centres of fashion." This distinction assumes that the term "dirndl" describes only clothing of more modern design.

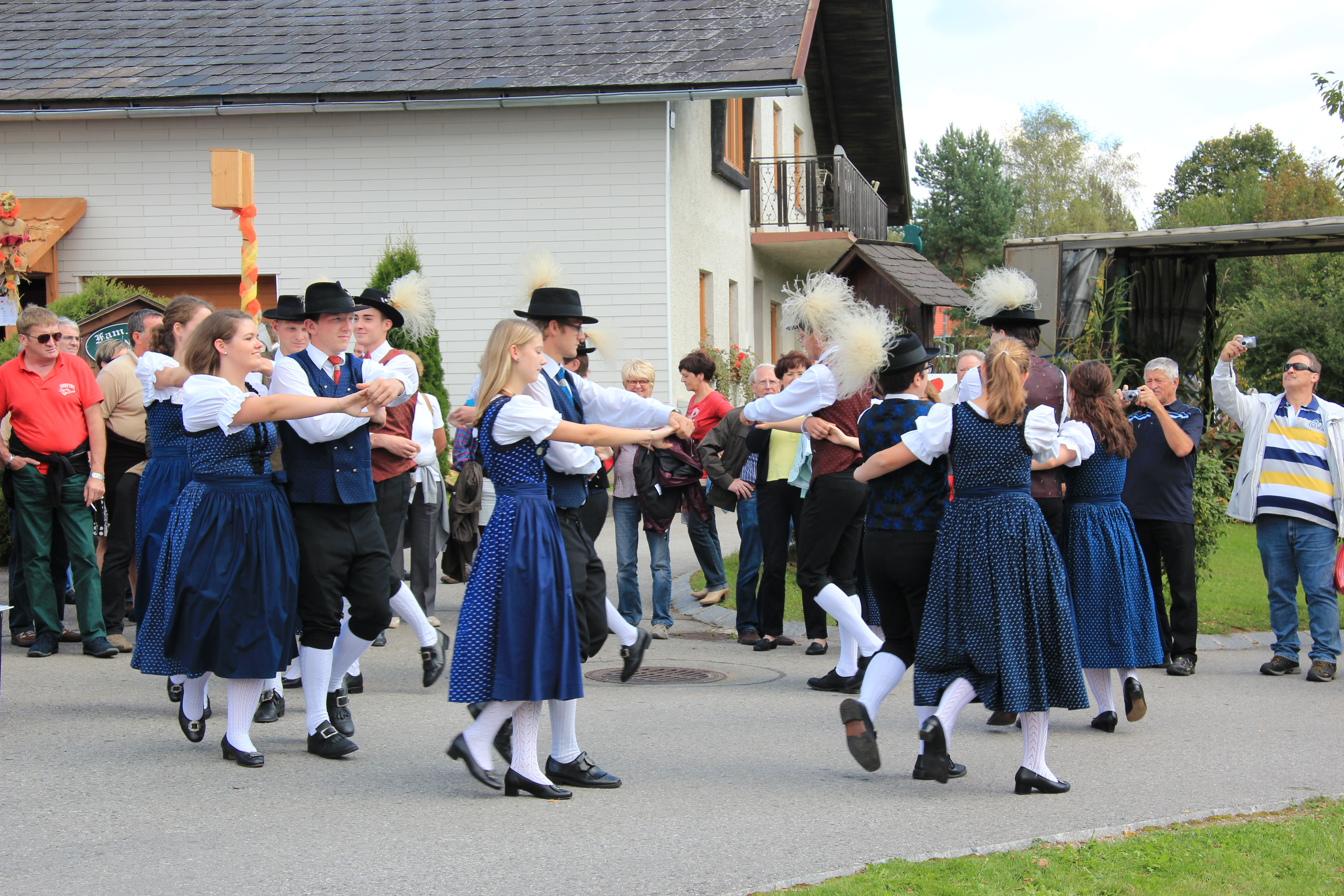
Women wearing the traditional blue dirndl from the Wachau region of Austria

However, many other German-speakers use the terms "Dirndl" and "Tracht" interchangeably for a woman's dress in the general dirndl style, regardless of whether the design is traditional or modern. For instance, tracht scholar Gexi Tostmann, who sees the modern dirndl as having evolved from traditional tracht designs, also uses the term "Dirndl" for historical designs. A developing consensus is that a dirndl can be described as "tracht" when it has been traditionally worn by a distinct group of people over a long period. This implies that a dress based on the design principles of Alpine tracht can also be called a "dirndl", even if it has a documented history of centuries as a folk costume. For example, the traditional blue polka-dotted dress of the Wachau region of Austria can be referred to either as "Wachauer Tracht" or as the "Wachauer (everyday) Dirndl". In English, the name "dirndl" is used interchangeably for traditional and modern designs.

== Basic design ==
The dirndl consists of a bodice, skirt, blouse, and apron.

The bodice (in German: Mieder or Leiberl) is tight to the body, with a deep neckline (décolletage). It is typically made in a single piece, with the join in the front centre, secured either by lacing, buttons, a hook-and-eye closure or a zip. A zip can alternatively be on the back or the side. Traditionally, the bodice was made from dark heavy cotton, so that it would be hard-wearing. In more modern designs, the material is often cotton, linen, velvet or silk. The material is coloured or printed. The neckline (Ausschnitt) of the bodice is traditionally round or rectangular (called "balconette"). In more modern designs, it may alternatively be high, V-shaped, heart-shaped or extra deep. The bodice often has embroidered decoration, especially when worn for public events.

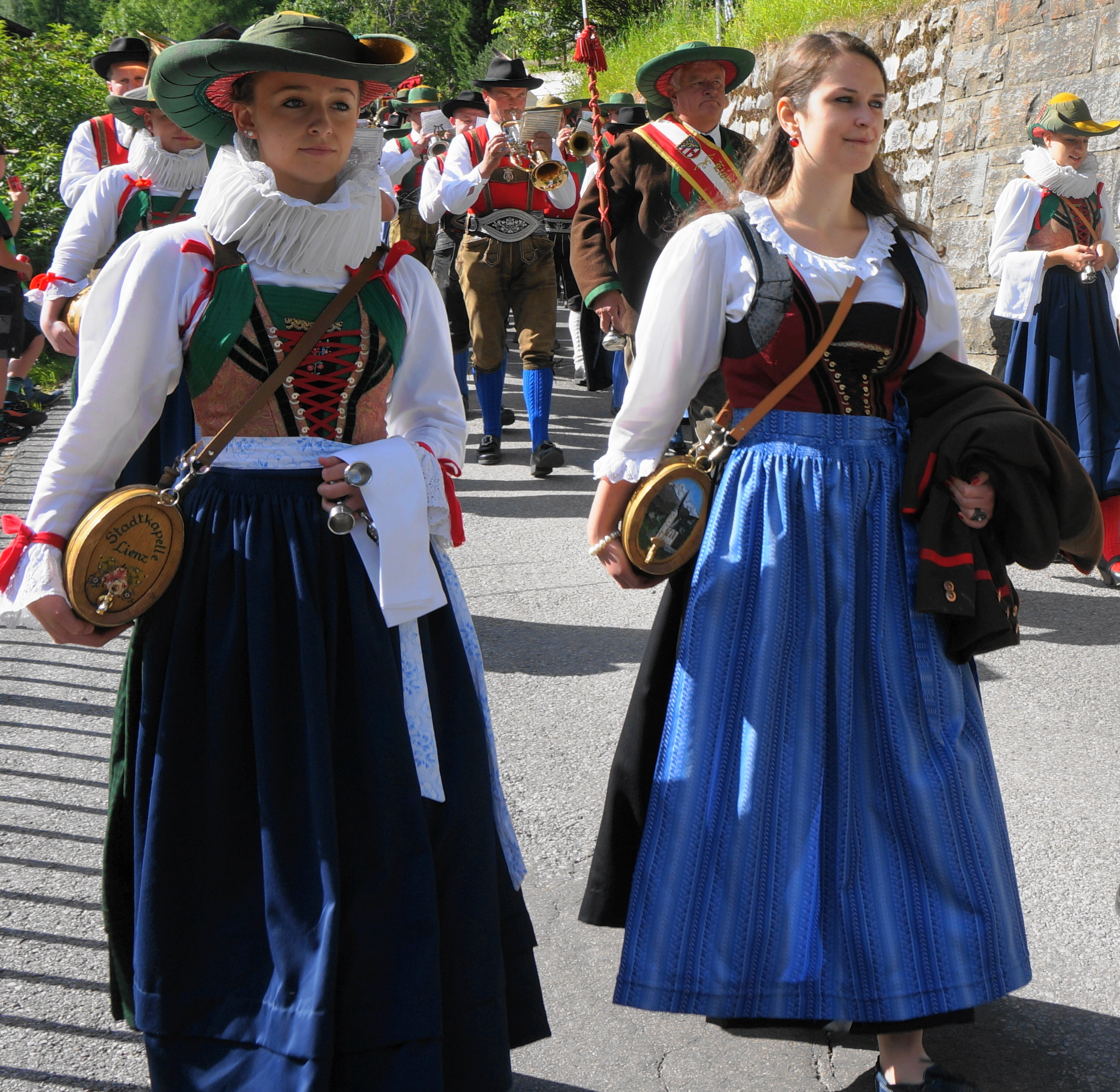
Traditional long-skirted dirndls from Lienz in Tyrol, Austria, 2015

The skirt (Rock) is full, with folds gathered in at the waist. Before the 1930s, the skirt was separate from the bodice, but since then the two have been sewn to one another. Long skirts are more traditional, but in more modern designs the skirts are normally mid-length; there are also miniskirt versions. The skirt typically has a pocket on the side or in front, hidden under the apron.

The blouse (Bluse) is worn under the bodice, and is cropped above the midriff. It is typically white, although other colours are possible. The blouse material is usually cambric, linen or lace. The cut of the blouse neckline changes the overall effect of the dirndl: a deeply cut blouse combines with a deeply cut bodice to accentuate décolletage, whereas a blouse with a high neckline gives a more modest effect. In traditional designs, the blouse neckline is at the base of the throat, but more recently V-shaped, balconette or heart-shaped necklines are popular. Short puff sleeves are typical, although narrow sleeves (short or long) are also common.

The apron (Schürze) is attached to the skirt and is narrow, covering only the front of the skirt. Traditional apron designs vary according to local tradition and are typically only a single colour. In modern designs, the designs are more elaborate.

The winter style dirndl has heavy, warm skirts, long sleeves and aprons made of thick cotton, linen, velvet or wool. The colours are usually brown, deep green or dark blue.

=== Traditional dirndls ===
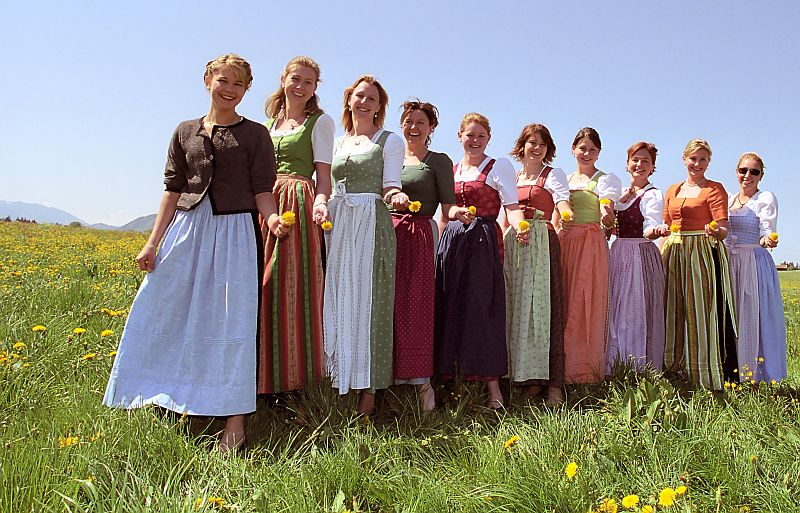
Different colour variations can depend on the origin of the woman wearing a dirndl.

Traditional dirndls vary in design between regions and even villages. The different details may indicate the place of origin and social status of the wearer. As with other folk costumes, traditional dirndls often come in two forms: one for everyday occasions, the other for traditional festivals and formal wear. Dirndls used on formal occasions are usually made with materials, designs, colours and embroidery specific to the region.

Some traditional designs feature pieces which drape over the breast, often combined with an elaborate collar. This has the function of concealing décolletage, in line with traditional Catholic ideas of modesty.

=== Wedding dirndls ===
Wedding dirndls are ceremonial forms of the dirndl worn by brides in Alpine regions of Germany, Austria, and South Tyrol. Rather than a standardised bridal gown, traditional wedding attire historically consisted of the bride's finest festive dirndl, adapted according to local customs and regional dress traditions.

Wedding dirndls are typically made from higher-quality materials than everyday dirndls, including silk, fine cotton, velvet, or linen. Colours traditionally varied by region and period and were not limited to white. Light shades such as ivory, cream, and pastel tones are common in modern examples, while darker colours were historically worn in some areas, particularly for winter weddings.

Formal elements often include lace or long-sleeved blouses, decorative aprons made of silk or organza, and traditional jewellery such as chokers or brooches. Contemporary wedding dirndls range from historically accurate reproductions of regional Tracht to modern interpretations that retain traditional structure while incorporating modern design details.

=== Accessories ===
Jewellery worn with the dirndl includes necklaces, earrings, chokers and chains. Also popular are brooches made of silver, the antlers of deer or even animals' teeth. Décolletage is often enhanced with a balconette bra (dirndl-BH), especially for large public events.

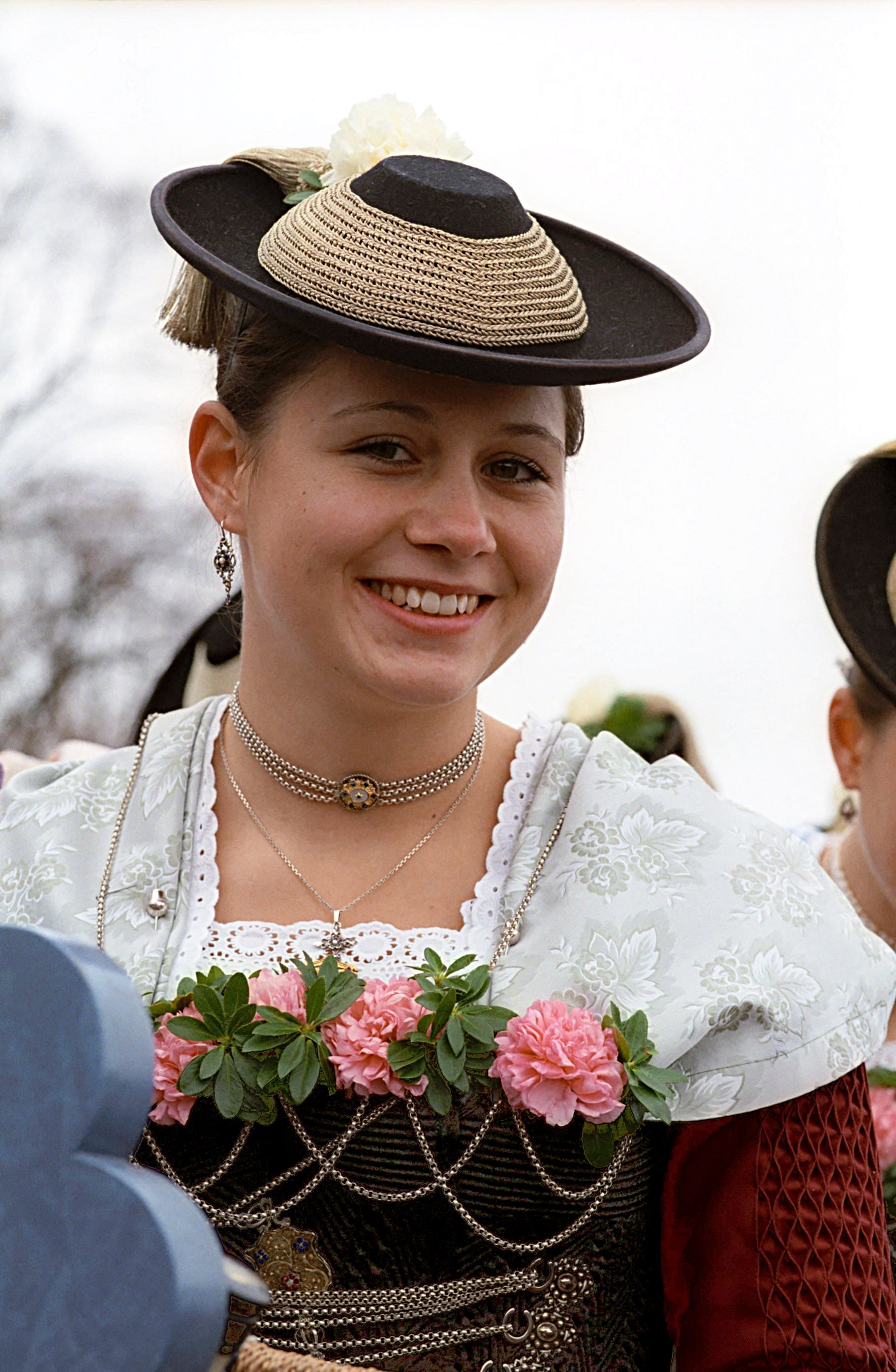
Woman wearing dirndl with spring flowers

In spring, the front of the bodice is sometimes decorated with a corsage of fresh flowers. Other popular accessories include waistcoats, silk aprons and vibrantly coloured, hand-printed silk scarves (the latter especially in the Austrian Ausseerland). In colder weather, long-sleeved woollen jackets (Janker) are worn, as are knitted woollen shawls.

The dirndl is often worn with a hair ornament called the jungfernkranz: a small floral wreath traditionally worn by unmarried women. In Hinterskirchen in Bavaria, unmarried women wear a small crown (kranl). In more formal settings such as church festivals, a hat or bonnet is traditionally worn. In some regions of southern Germany and Austria, married women accompany the dirndl with a bonnet called a goldhaube. This headgear developed in the 17th century from a veil or headscarf and was worn by middle class urban women; later the custom spread to the countryside. The goldhaube is characterized by interwoven silk and golden threads, embroidered with lamé, gold and sequins. There are many regional varieties, including the Riegelhaube in Munich, the Linzer Goldhaube in Linz and the Brettlhaube in Wachau.

Shoes worn with the dirndl are typically court shoes (pumps) or flat, ballerina-type shoes. Knee-length socks or tights are commonly worn on the legs.

=== Dress etiquette ===
The dirndl is meant to be tightly fitted and worn with a blouse. Since the dress is meant to look rustic, plastic dirndls are considered inappropriate by some.

In the past few decades, a modern tradition has developed around the placement of the knot on the apron. According to this tradition, tying the sash on the woman's left side indicates that she is single and available, while a knot tied on the right means that she is married, engaged or otherwise not interested in dating. In some versions, this is extended to a knot in the centre of the front (underage or non-disclosing) or the centre of the back (widow, waitress or child).

=== Adaptations ===
A dirndl skirt is a full, wide skirt, gathered into folds at the waist.

The German terms Trachtenmode and Landhausmode (literally "country house style") describe clothing of various styles borrowing elements from folk costume, such as colour, cut or material. Examples would be single-piece dresses featuring a dirndl skirt.

In recent decades, fashion designers have been creating their own interpretations of the dirndl. While appearing to be simple and plain, a properly made modern dirndl may be quite expensive as it is tailored, and sometimes cut from costly hand-printed or silk fabrics.

A recent adaptation is the African dirndl (Dirndlkleid à l'Africaine), which is a fusion fashion: the bodice and skirt are made from African printed material. The idea was innovated by two Cameroonian sisters and Chief executive officers of the Noh Nee label in Munich, Marie Darouiche and her sister Rahmée Wetterich. The African dirndl was premiered at Oktoberfest in 2019.

=== Similar designs ===
Other traditional European folk costumes are sometimes mistaken for dirndls, since they include similar design elements. Examples of such folk costumes include different tracht traditions in German-speaking countries (e.g. the Gutach valley tracht from the Black Forest), as well as traditional folk costume in Norway (Bunad) and Denmark. Traditional women's clothing from Slovenia also contains similar design elements, but has its own distinct ethnic traditions.

== History ==
The dirndl has passed through different periods in its history. These include (1) its origins as rural clothing, (2) development as a recognized folk costume, (3) evolution as a fashion style, (4) appropriation by the Nazis, (5) decline in popularity after the Second World War, followed by (6) a resurgence from 1990. Each of these periods has left an impression on the design and perception of the dirndl.

=== Origins ===
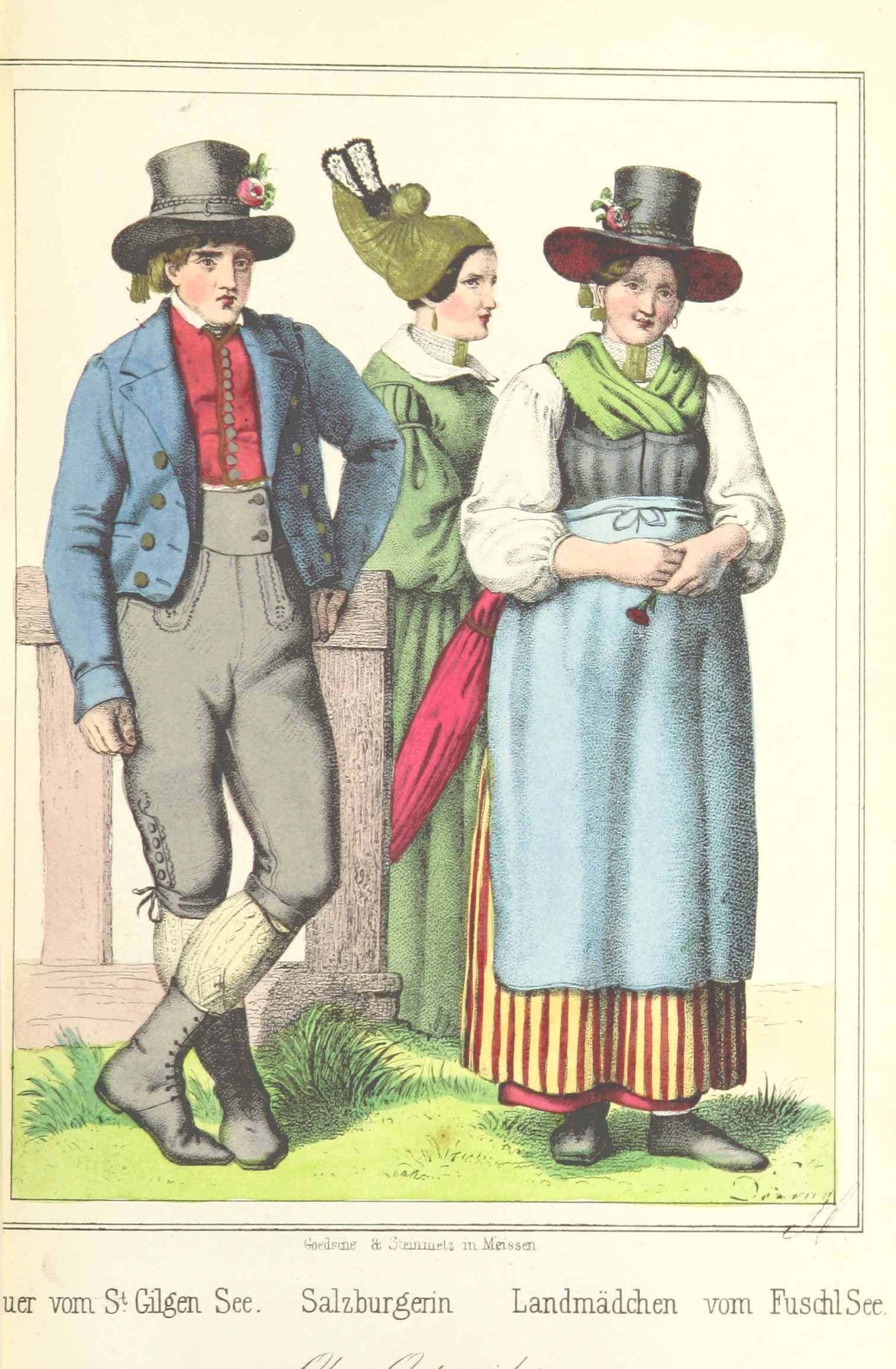
Young woman in dirndl from Salzburg region (right) and farmer's wife wearing goldhaube (centre), 1847

The dirndl originated as a dress worn in rural areas, a more hardy form of the costume worn today. Folk costumes showed that the wearer belonged to a particular social class, occupation, religious persuasion or ethnic group. Differing designs developed in different regions, influenced by available materials and costumes in neighbouring regions, as well as trends in urban areas, royal courts and the military.

Design elements of the dirndl, such as a dress consisting of a bodice and skirt worn over a blouse, were already present in the kirtle, a garment commonplace in Europe between the Middle Ages and the 18th century. Similar elements also occur in other folk costumes, such as tracht designs in other parts of Germany, the Norwegian women's Bunad and the Upper Carniola costume of Slovenia. Distinctive features of the dirndl (including the tight bodice, lower neckline and wide skirt), developed from the women's fashions of the royal court in the 17th century; over time, the court fashions made their way into urban and rural clothing. Alpine traditional costume spread to regions in Bavaria and Austria outside the mountains through migration in search of work. As a result, the dirndl developed over time into female Austrian servants' work clothes.

Distinctions developed between the everyday version of rural costumes and the version used for festive occasions; the festive version of each costume tradition was considered the ideal form. Festive dirndls were especially worn at events associated with the Catholic church, such as Sunday church services and public pilgrim processions. Other popular occasions included markets and Volksfeste. Over time, festive versions of the dirndl developed elaborate decoration around the collar and breast, including embroidery, floral decorations, tassels and lace collars draped over the shoulders and breast. Elaborate headwear (such as the Goldhaube) developed to indicate distinctions in social status.

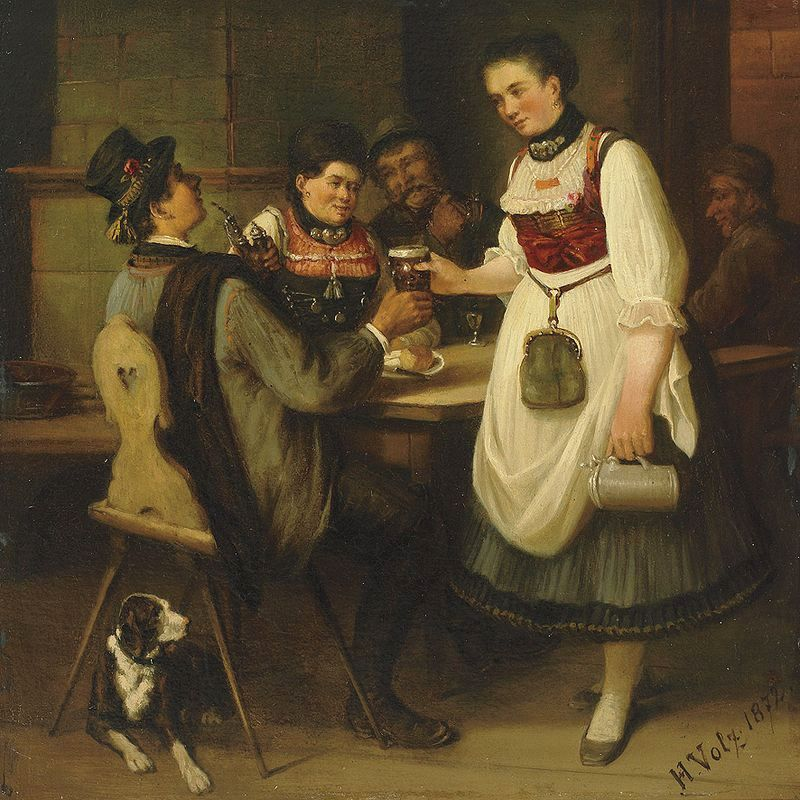
Painting by Hermann Volz (1814–1894), Junge Schankmagd bringt Bier an den Stammtisch (Young barmaid bringing beer to the regulars), 1872

Nevertheless, folk costume was increasingly perceived as a marker of rural and working classes. The background to this development was the French government policy from the mid-17th century onwards of promoting and exporting luxury fashion, using expensive materials such as silk, lace, and gold and silver thread. Attempts by other European governments to fight French economic dominance of the fashion industry had the effect of spreading fashion in the French style. For instance, the Austrian empress Maria Theresa considered imposing a sumptuary tax to prevent expenditure on French luxury fashions, but was persuaded to establish a home-grown fashion industry on the French model. Although the rich usually led fashion, the middle classes and even peasants copied the trends among the wealthier classes. By 1800, dress styles were similar among many Western Europeans; local variation became first a sign of provincial culture and later a mark of the conservative peasant.

Thus the spread of French fashions increased the contrast between the fashionable clothes of the wealthier classes and folk costumes, which were increasingly perceived as rustic, not fit for polite society. This point is illustrated by the first Oktoberfest, held in 1810 to celebrate the wedding of Crown Prince Ludwig of Bavaria (later King Ludwig I) to Therese of Saxe-Hildburghausen; the citizens of Munich were invited to the festivities but were supplied with French clothes, since their folk costumes were not considered suitable for public occasions.

=== Development of the dirndl as folk costume (19th century) ===
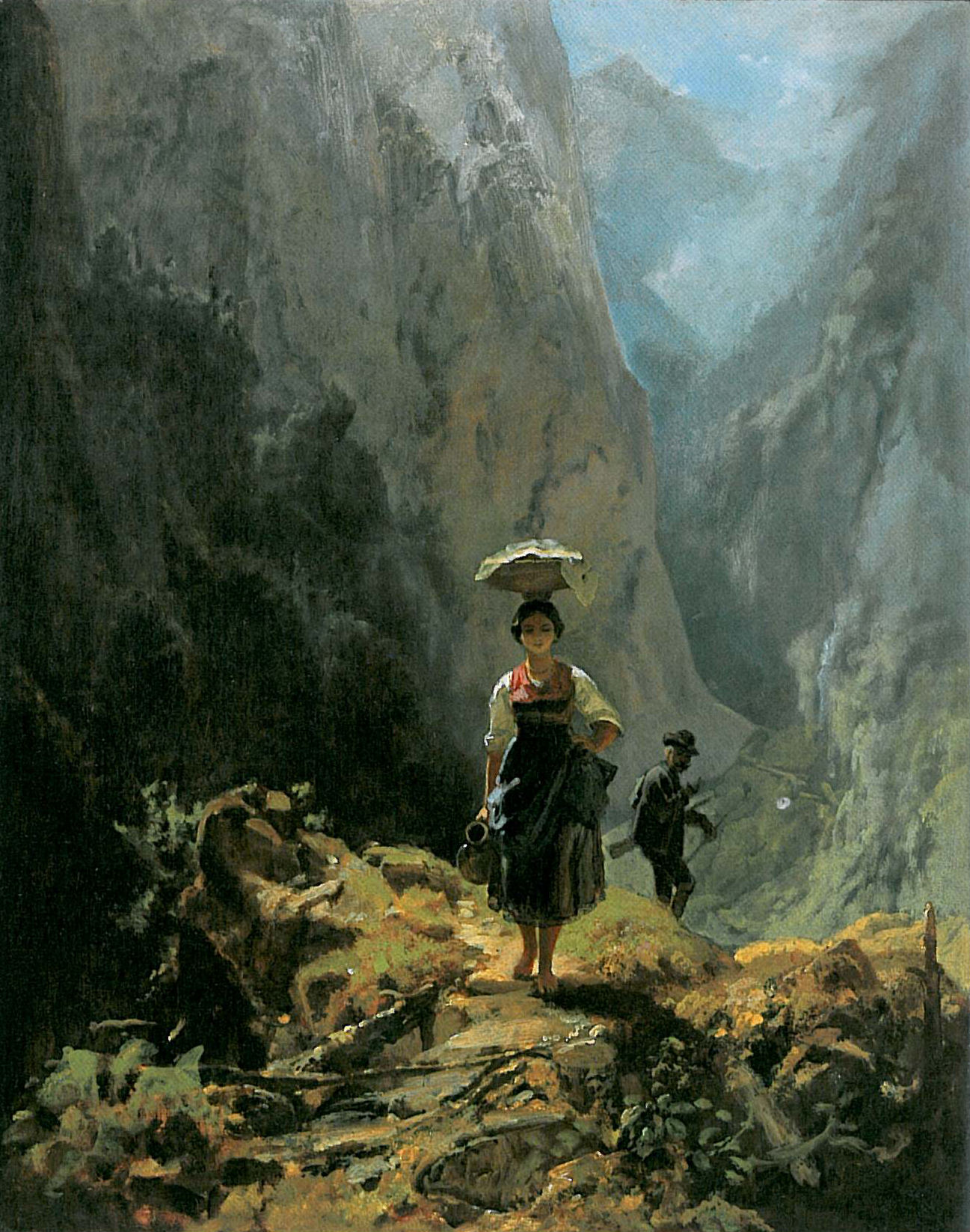
Painting by Carl Spitzweg (1808–1885), Dirndl und Jäger im Gebirge (Young woman and hunter in the mountains), 1870

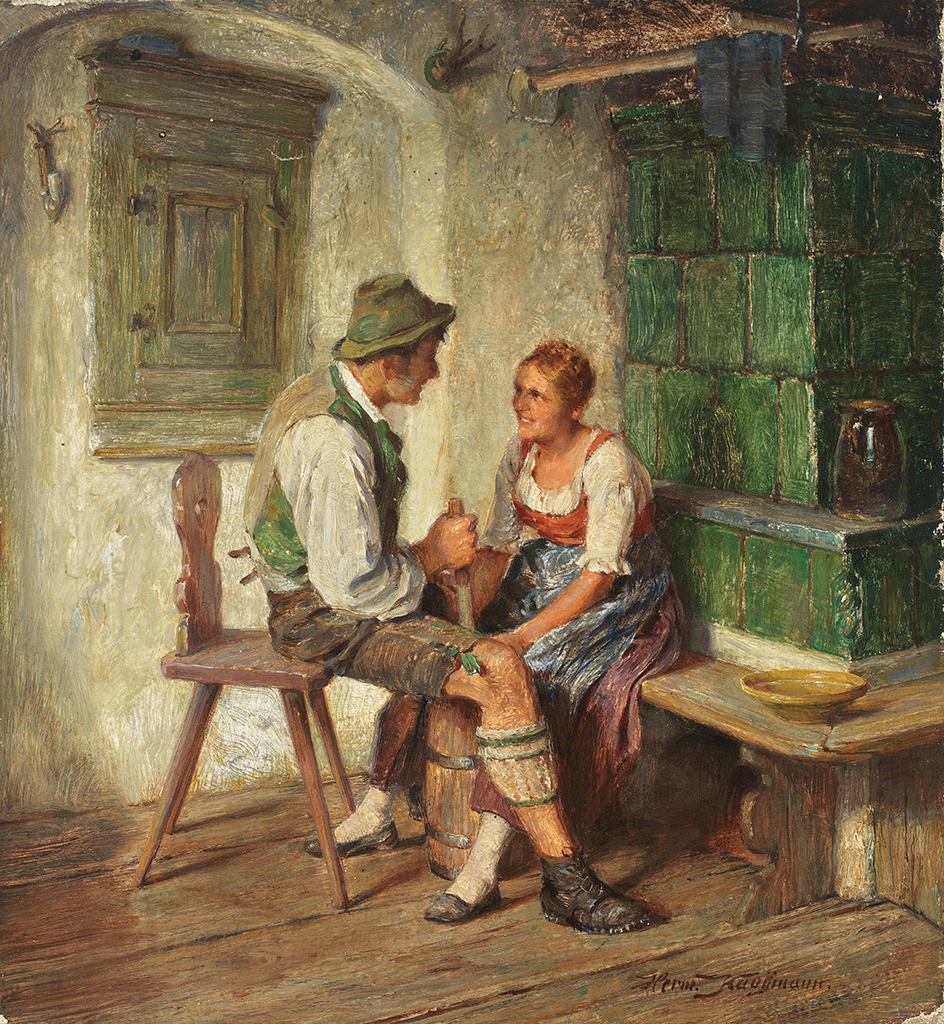
Painting by Hermann Kauffmann (1808–1889), Tändelndes Paar beim Buttern in der Stube (Couple courting while churning butter)

As antithesis to the dominance of French fashion, in the early 19th century a movement to study and preserve the traditional costumes of the rural populations developed in many European countries. Examples of this movement outside the German-language sphere include the Highland romantic revival in Scotland, the Danish folklore movement and the Bunad movement in Norway. In German-speaking countries, the movement was known as the Trachtenbewegung (Tracht movement), and resulted in initiatives to study and promote folk costumes, including the dirndl. The folk costume movement is one aspect of national romanticism, and part of the more widespread Romantic movement of the early 19th century.

Art historian Gabriele Crepaldi points out the links between the ideological and political dimensions of the Romantic movement:

The label romantic ... (refers to) a cultural movement which spread in Great Britain, France, Italy and other European countries between the late 18th century and the first half of the 19th century. Its protagonists were philosophers, writers, musicians and painters. In Germany it was the writers and intellectuals of the Sturm and Drang movement who reacted critically against the rationalism of the Enlightenment and the doctrines of neo-Classicism. The Romantics defended the creative and spiritual autonomy of individuals and proclaimed their freedom from aesthetic norms and pretensions. Inwardness and subjective feeling found in romantic art their authentic expression... On the other side, political positions stood behind Romantic expressions: in contrast to the Enlightenment's ideology of global citizenship, the Romantics re-discovered the idea of the homeland and the value of the folk culture. Especially in Italy and Germany, a connection can be seen to the movements for national reunification.

Crepaldi said that the Romantics promoted emotion against the rationalism of the Enlightenment, individual freedom against academic dictates and national against global culture. In Germany, Austria and Switzerland, the Enlightenment was especially associated with France, which had sent its armies across Europe in the Revolutionary and Napoleonic Wars (1792–1815). In response to the humiliations of the repeated French invasions, the protagonists of German romanticism sought to strengthen their cultural heritage. The result was a flowering of research and artistic work centred around Germanic cultural traditions, expressed in painting, literature, architecture, music and promotion of German language and folklore. The promotion of folk costumes similarly strengthened national identity in a visible way, especially against French-inspired fashions.

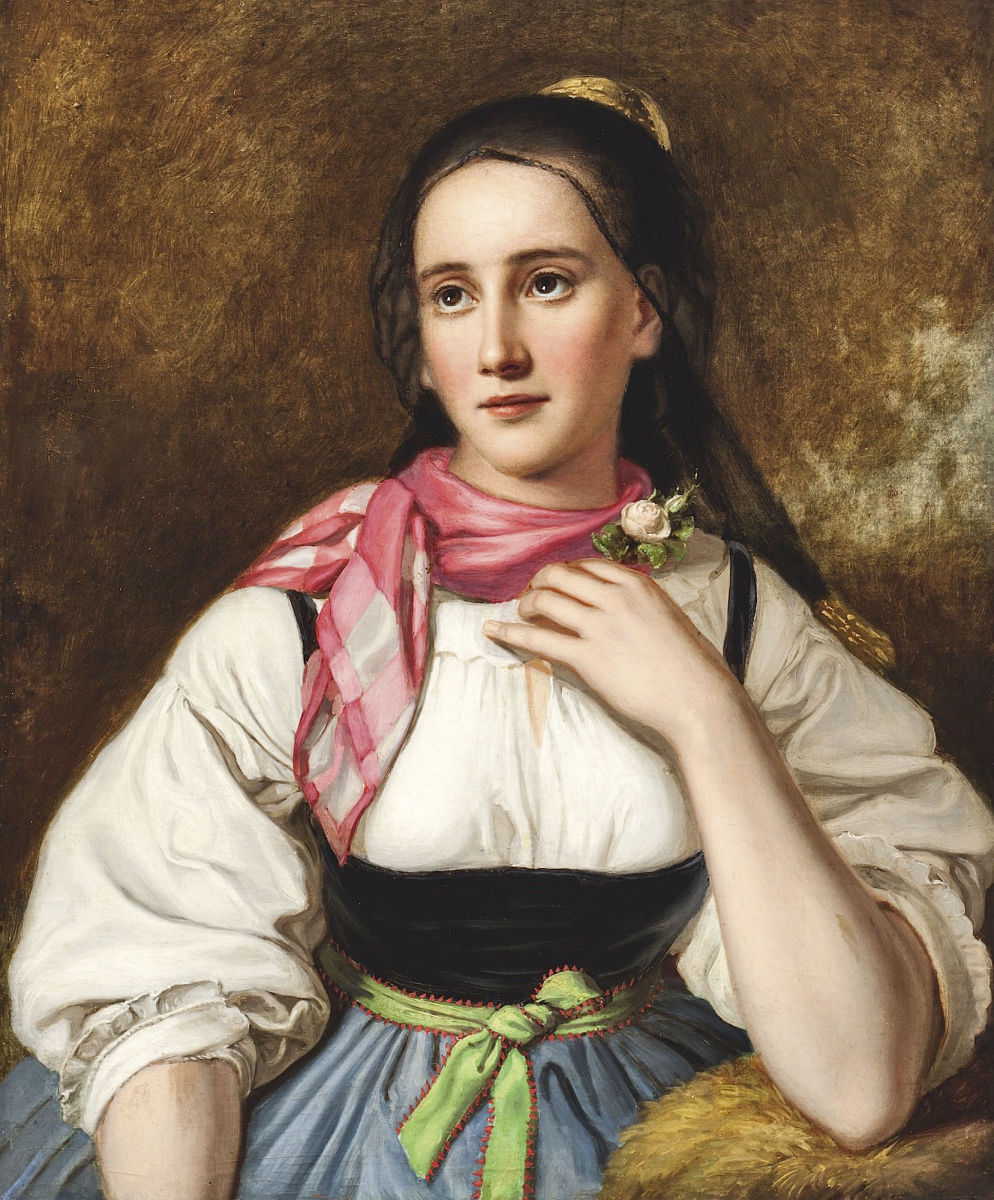
Painting by Johann Baptist Reiter (1813–1890), Frau in oberösterreichischer Tracht (Woman in folk costume from Upper Austria)

The earliest public promotion of tracht in the German-speaking world occurred in Switzerland, at the Unspunnen festivals of 1805 and 1808. At both events, a parade of traditional costumes was held; the 1808 festival resulted in the formation of the Swiss National Costume Association.

In Bavaria and Austria, the royal courts developed enthusiasm for the different costumes of the rural population, which they saw as a means of strengthening national unity; this was consistent with the philosophy of national romanticism, which considers the state to derive its political legitimacy from the unity of those it governs. The first extensive description of traditional tracht in the different regions was given by the Bavarian official Joseph von Hazzi (1768–1845). A comprehensive description of Bavarian national costumes was published in 1830 by the archivist Felix Joseph von Lipowsky. A parade of traditional costumes took place in 1835 at Oktoberfest, to celebrate the silver wedding anniversary of King Ludwig I of Bavaria (reigned 1825–1848) and Queen Therese. Under his successor Maximilian II (reigned 1848–1864), traditional costumes were officially recognised as clothing suitable for wearing at the royal court. The king himself included officials wearing tracht in his court ceremonies and wrote in 1849 that he considered the wearing of folk costume of "great importance" for national sentiment.

In 1859, the first association to promote folk costume was founded in Miesbach in Bavaria. In the following years, similar tracht associations (Trachtenvereine) were founded throughout Germany and Austria. The tracht associations promoted research and wearing of the traditional clothing in each region. This helped preserve the traditions against modern fashions; in contrast, the wearing of the traditional tracht declined in regions where the tracht associations were not active. The first umbrella organisation for the tracht associations was founded in 1890.

By the later 19th century, it had become popular for members of the royal courts in Austria and Bavaria to wear folk costume, in order to promote identification between the population and the court. Among the most prominent royal patrons of folk costume were the Austrian Emperor Franz Joseph and Luitpold, Prince Regent of Bavaria, the successor of Ludwig II; both often hunted wearing lederhosen. Around 1875, Elisabeth of Bavaria, the wife of Austrian Emperor Franz Joseph, promoted wearing a rustic dress called a 'Sisi', based on the peasant dirndl.

=== Evolution as a fashion style (1870s–1930s) ===
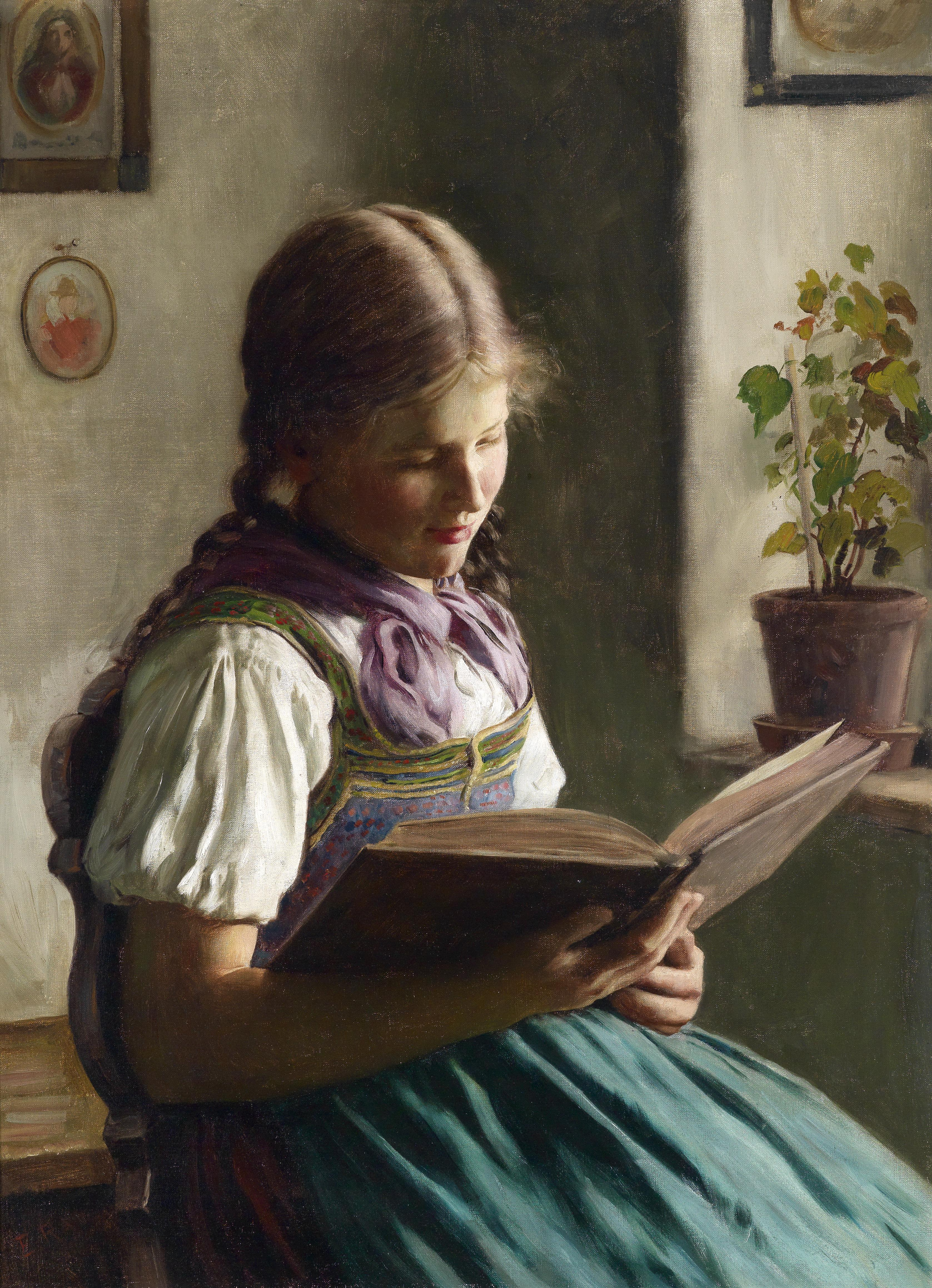
Painting by Emil Rau (1858–1937), Lesendes Mädchen (Girl reading)

The wearing of folk costume by royalty encouraged its adoption by other members of the upper and wealthier middle classes. From the 1870s onwards, the dirndl developed as a typical "country" dress amongst the wealthy patrons of the summer resort towns in Austria and Bavaria. The adoption of the dirndl as a fashion resulted in a synthesis of tradition and high fashion: the dirndls worn by upper-class women took the basic design of the traditional dirndl but also used more fashionable materials such as silk, lace and expensive thread. The garment was made more closely fitted to emphasize the female body shape. The adoption of the dirndl by upper and middle classes raised the status of the traditional clothing; this in turn encouraged country people to value and continue wearing the traditional folk costumes.

Key in the evolution of the dirndl to a commercial fashion were the Jewish brothers Julius (1874–1965) and Moritz Wallach (1879–1963), originally from Bielefeld in north-western Germany. After moving to Munich with their family in 1895, they became interested in and began promoting Alpine tracht. In a personal memoir, Moritz Wallach later stated, "We saw a possibility to keep these irreplaceable traditions and to revitalize them." The seamstresses employed by the Wallach brothers produced elegant dirndls from colourful printed fabrics, predominantly silk; these were exhibited by models in the Alpine resorts. A major breakthrough for the Wallach brothers came in 1910, when they organized and paid for the traditional costume parade for the 100th anniversary celebrations of the Oktoberfest. They also designed a festive dirndl for Princess Marie-Auguste of Anhalt, which created a sensation at a ball in Paris; virtually overnight, the Wallach name became internationally famous in fashionable circles.

In the hard economic times following the First World War, the dirndl became a big-seller; as a simple summer dress, it was an affordable alternative to the often expensive and elaborately worked historic women's costumes. Between 1920 and 1926, the Wallach brothers operated the Münchner Volkskunsthaus ("Munich house of folk art"). In 1926, Moritz Wallach founded the Wallach-haus (Wallach House), a specialist supplier of tracht and folk art, which became well known outside the borders of Germany.

In Austria, the wearing of folk costume was promoted by Viktor von Geramb (1884–1958), professor of folk culture at the universities of Graz and Vienna. He saw folk costume as a means of rejuvenating Austrian identity after the collapse of the Austro-Hungarian monarchy during the First World War. Von Geramb was critical of the tracht associations for insisting rigidly on the historic designs, which were treated as a uniform of the association. He argued that, for folk costume to be a living tradition, it needed to express the individuality of the wearer; thus designs and materials needed to be adapted to contemporary culture and technology. Accordingly, he worked with commercial firms on finding material and designs that would allow the production of folk costume in large quantities. Consequently, Alpine tracht gained in general popularity and even spread to eastern Austria, where it had not been part of the traditional clothing culture. The dirndl was increasingly perceived as the Austrian national dress.

In 1930, the Wallach brothers supplied the stage costumes for the operetta The White Horse Inn (Im weißen Rössl). The romantic comedy presented an idyllic picture of the Austrian Alps and had long runs in cities including Berlin, Vienna, Munich, London, Paris and New York. Inspired by the resolute innkeeper heroine, the dirndl became an international fashion phenomenon, always with an apron and usually with deep décolletage. This widespread adoption was helped along by a general 1930s trend to a silhouette which matched the folk costume: full skirts, higher hemlines, broader shoulders and tailored waists.

The dirndl was also promoted through the Trapp Family Singers, who wore dirndls during their performance at the Salzburg Festival (1936), and later on their worldwide tours. In addition, the film Heidi, with Shirley Temple in the lead role, became a hit in 1937. By that year, the dirndl was considered a 'must' in the wardrobe of every fashionable American woman.

=== Appropriation by the Nazis (1930s–1945) ===
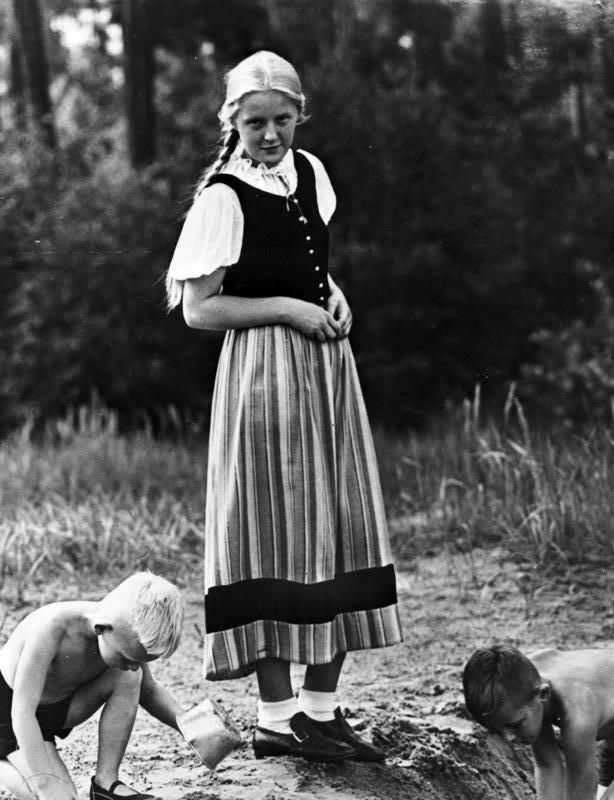
A young German girl in dirndl watching boys playing

German traditional costume, including the dirndl, was instrumentalized by the Nazis as a symbol of pan-German identity in the countries under Nazi rule (Germany from 1933, Austria from 1938). The dirndl was used to promote the Nazi ideal of the German woman as hard-working and fertile. An example is a propaganda photo released by the (Nazi Party) Office of Racial Politics, showing a young blonde girl wearing a dirndl, watching over small boys playing.

Jews were forbidden to use "folk culture", even though they had played such a prominent role in documenting and promoting it. In 1938, the Wallach brothers were forced to sell their business for less than its worth. Moritz Wallach emigrated to the United States, followed shortly after by Julius. Their brother Max, who had also been involved in the business, was interned in Dachau concentration camp and was murdered at Auschwitz in 1944.

Viktor von Geramb, who had promoted the dirndl in Austria, lost his position at the University of Vienna in 1938 because of his public opposition to Nazi racial theory. He was especially criticized for his strong attachment to Christian ideas of human worth. He was restored to his position at the university after the defeat of the Nazi régime in 1945.

The National Socialist Women's League established the office of the "Reich Commissioner for German costume" under the leadership of Gertrud Pesendorfer (1895–1982). In 1938, she published dirndl designs by Gretel Karasek (1910–1992), which Pesendorfer described as "renewed costume". Pesendorfer claimed that Karasek made the following innovations from traditional designs: (1) the collar was removed, allowing display of décolletage; (2) long sleeves were replaced by puff sleeves; (3) the waist was emphasised with tighter lacing and buttons; and (4) the skirt was reduced to mid length. The overall effect accentuated the female form and especially the breasts. Pesendorfer described the new style as "de-catholicised" (entkatholisiert); she said her goal was to free the costume of "overburdening by church, industrialization and fashionable cries" and "foreign influences" and to let the "rogue sub-culture" back again. However, Pesendorfer´s claims are questionable, since all the claimed innovations by Karasek were already present in the previous decades during which the dirndl evolved as a fashion. For instance, the painting "Lesendes Mädchen" painted by Emil Rau (see above) clearly shows puff sleeves, although Rau died in 1937, before Karasek's designs were published.

=== Decline and resurgence (1945–present) ===
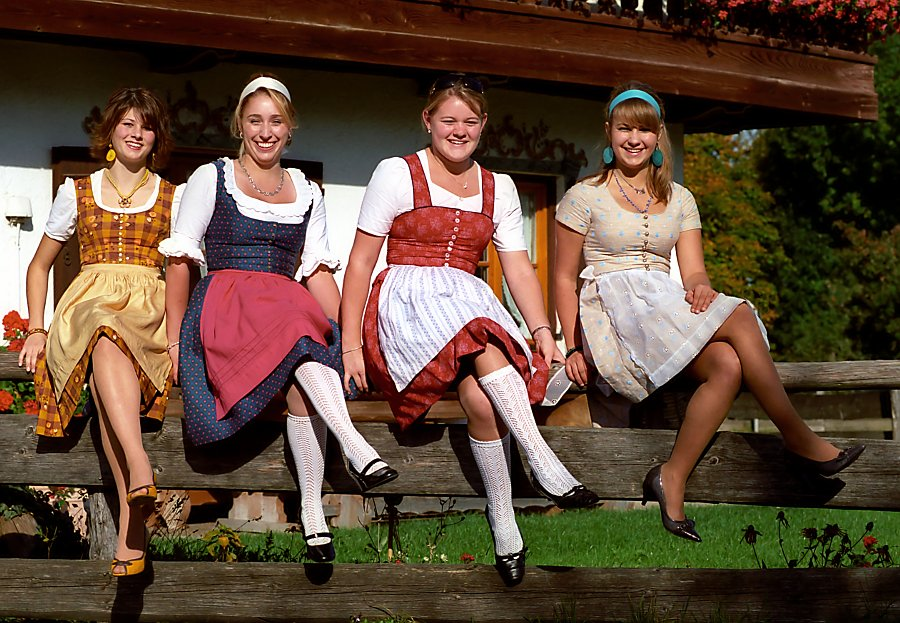
Seated women wearing dirndls from the 1970s

The Second World War (1939–1945) began a downturn in the popularity of the dirndl. After Hitler's invasion of Poland in 1939, American and British consumers began rejecting all things German. In turn, new fashion influences appeared in popular culture, such as the film Gone With the Wind, which premiered less than three months after the fall of Warsaw. By 1941, the dirndl had been replaced as an American fashion craze by the wasp waist.

In Germany and Austria, the dirndl declined in popularity, especially in the cities. Its image had been tarred by association with the Nazis, like other Germanic traditions, such as beer-drinking and sausages. Traditional clothing was often associated with conservative political views. As a consequence, the dress was regarded as old-fashioned or rustic by many, especially those connected with the fashion industry.

Nevertheless, many others continued to wear the dirndl as a dress for festive occasions, both in the Bavarian countryside and in cities such as Munich. Dirndls were regarded as suitable clothing for attending church, public holidays, Oktoberfest and other festive occasions, and were especially popular as bridal dresses.

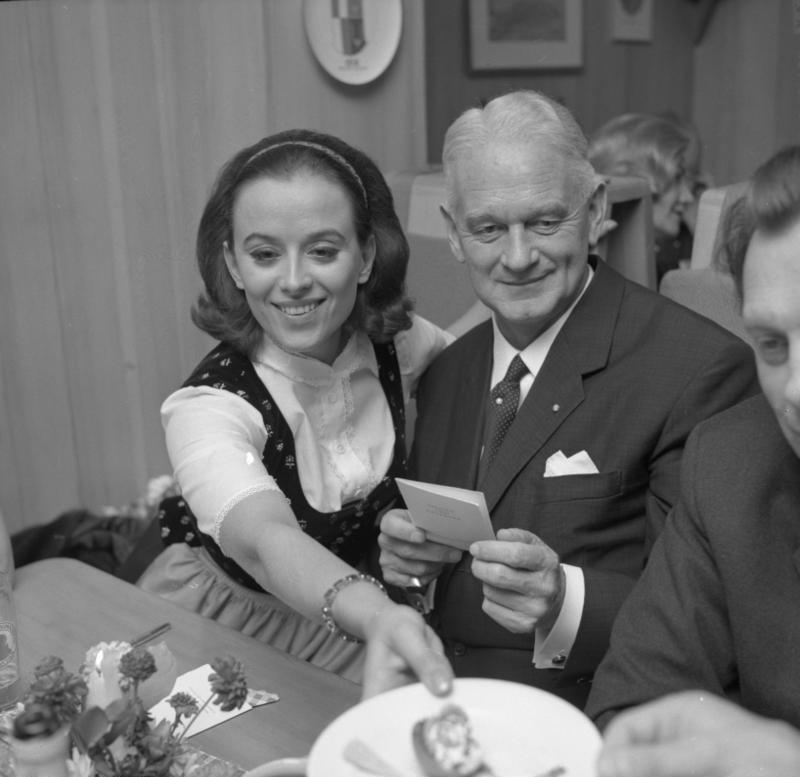
German opera singer Ingeborg Hallstein wearing a dirndl at an official reception, 1966

A wider revival of interest came with the 1972 Summer Olympics in Munich. Led by Silvia Sommerlath (later Queen Silvia of Sweden), the hostesses wore sky-blue dirndls as a promotion of Bavarian identity. Culture historian Simone Egger comments, "As (Sommerlath) in 1972 made headlines as an Olympia hostess in a dirndl, then every woman wanted to have a dirndl."

In the 1980s, there was a further revival of interest in the dirndl, as traditional clothing was adopted by the environmental and anti-nuclear movements. The rural connotations of the clothing and the fact that it is produced from natural, rather than synthetic materials, go well with a desire to return to a "world that is intact".

Beginning in the late 1990s, dirndls and lederhosen experienced a boom in Austria and Bavaria, with some commentators speaking of a "dirndl Renaissance". By 2013, it had become standard for every young Bavarian to have traditional clothing in their wardrobe. This increased interest in traditional clothing was noticed by fashion houses. Since the 2000s, increasing numbers of fashion houses have become involved in designing and selling high-end versions. The garment was praised in 2001 by designer Vivienne Westwood during a visit to a fashion event in Austria. When some of the attendees criticised the garment as old-fashioned, she responded, "I do not understand you Austrians. If every woman wore a dirndl, there would not be any more ugliness". Subsequently, Westwood and her husband were honoured with the tile "Ambassador for Tracht" in 2010.

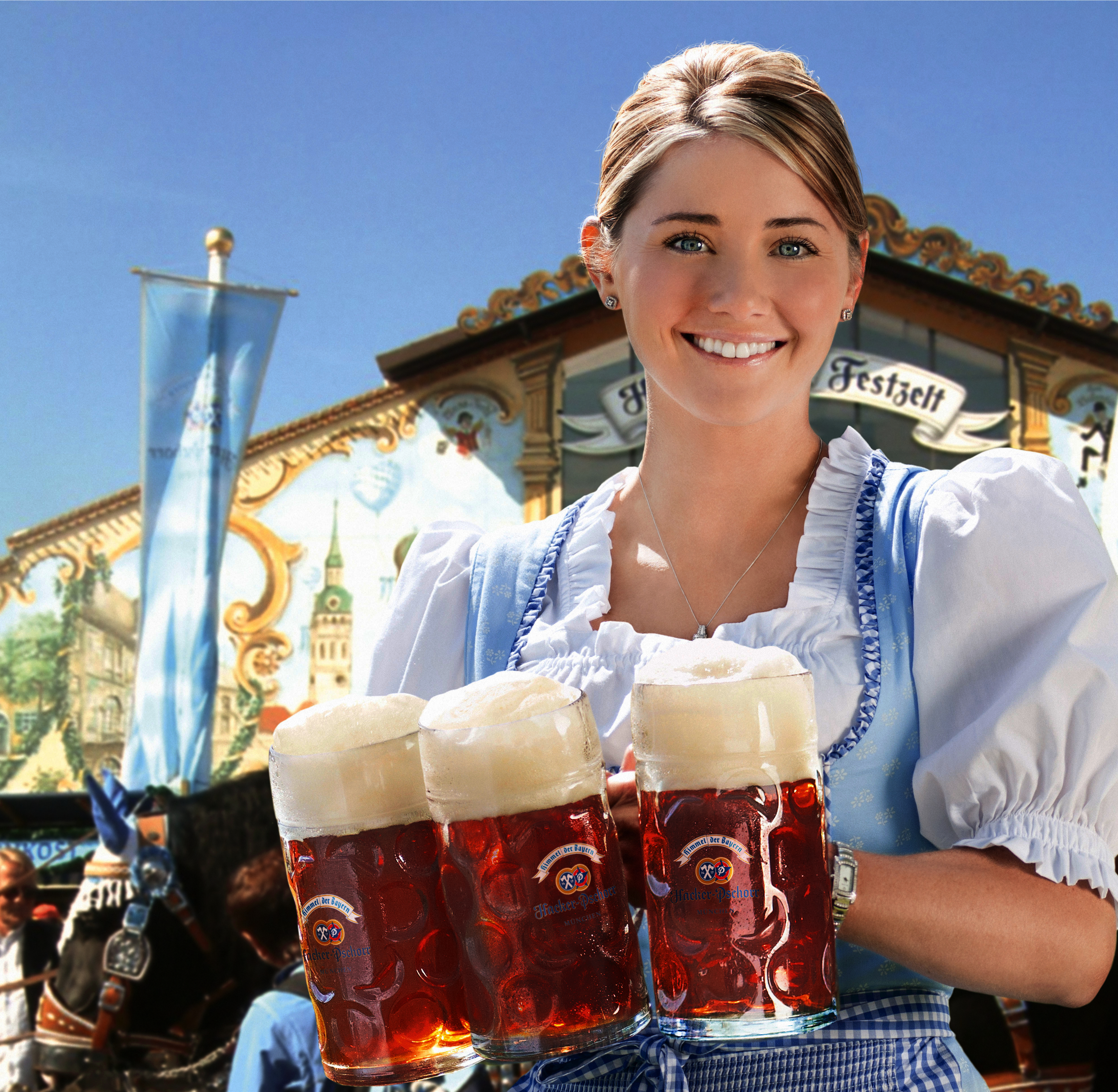
Beer waitress wearing a dirndl at Oktoberfest

Dirndls and lederhosen have long been standard attire for staff at Volksfeste, but in the 1970s visitors at the festivals did not normally wear folk costume, even at Oktoberfest. Simone Egger comments that the idea of wearing folk costume to Oktoberfest would previously have been considered "completely absurd, even embarrassing." Now the idea of wearing jeans to a Volksfest is unthinkable: folk costume is considered obligatory. In a study in 2004, Egger found that, from a sample group of those attending Oktoberfest, 50% were wearing tracht for the first time. She found that the enthusiasm for tracht clothing was increasing every year.

One reason given for the increasing popularity of the dirndl and lederhosen is an increased confidence in German self-identity. In the years following the Second World War, there was often a shame in German identity because of the crimes of the Nazi régime. In recent decades, there has been a celebration of being German. This "new patriotism" was evident in the support for the German football team at the 2006 FIFA World Cup. According to journalist Michaela Strassmair, "As the international media arrived in Munich for the World Cup, they all wanted to see the same picture and share it with the world: pretty girls in Munich wearing dirndls."

The culture historian Peter Peter comments on this increased pride in German identity and traditions:

Now there is a new generation that did not know the problems of the Cold War or the Second World War, for whom it is cool to try these old-fashioned things. It´s avant-garde in a certain way to rediscover that even sauerkraut can be an excellent dish. I think a very good symbol of this new Germany is the Oktoberfest. Twenty years ago nobody there would dress in the traditional Bavarian costume. Now everybody does it and it doesn't seem either nationalistic or jingoistic. The Oktoberfest, with its enormous number of beer consumers, is a wonderful example of the new Germany that combines iconic tradition with open-mindedness. It brings people and peoples together more even than football. It is not nationalist – it is now a symbol of German hospitality.

Other commentators link the upsurge in folk costume to economic insecurity caused by globalization, prompting a return to traditional cultural symbols. Simone Egger concludes that the renewed popularity of traditional clothing is driven by desires for community and belonging, symbolized by folk costume. These desires stand in tension with the desire for individuality, expressed in alterations and decoration. Culture journalist Alfons Kaiser makes similar observations:

Just as jeans, originally rural clothing, were used as an urban antidote to tradition, so dirndl and lederhosen show that, a generation later, people in their metaphysical homelessness are nevertheless in a complex way missing the traditional rural values. When one puts an item with traditional meaning on one's body, naturally one transfigures and romanticizes life on the land, actually so difficult and often brutal. All this is typical of our time. From yoghurt to magazines with rural themes, one abandons oneself to the illusion of the good old times, in which the windowpanes can still keep out the cold wind of globalization.

The dirndl is increasingly attracting attention apart from its area of origin. In 2019, The Times of India ran an article featuring Bollywood actress Celina Jaitley wearing a dirndl; she urged other Indian women to add the dress to their wardrobe.

== Recent customs by country ==
=== Austria ===
In Austria, dirndls continue to be worn on public occasions, even by younger women. The dirndl is considered an important part of Alpine folk culture. Other aspects of folk culture are Lederhosen for men, traditional sports (e.g. shooting, music, crossbow), skills (e.g. embroidery) and musical traditions (e.g. singing Christmas carols and Schuhplattler dance groups). The folk culture is promoted by and protected by local folk culture associations, which are affiliated with the Bund der Österreichischen Trachten- und Heimatverbände (Federation of Austrian folk costume and homeland associations).

The Catholic church has played an important role in promoting the dirndl in Austria; traditional dress is worn for worship services, especially the major church holidays (e.g. Easter, Pentecost, Corpus Christi) and saints´ feast days. The Tyrol has a tradition of the heiligen Tracht (holy folk costume), which is not to be worn on secular occasions marked by drinking.

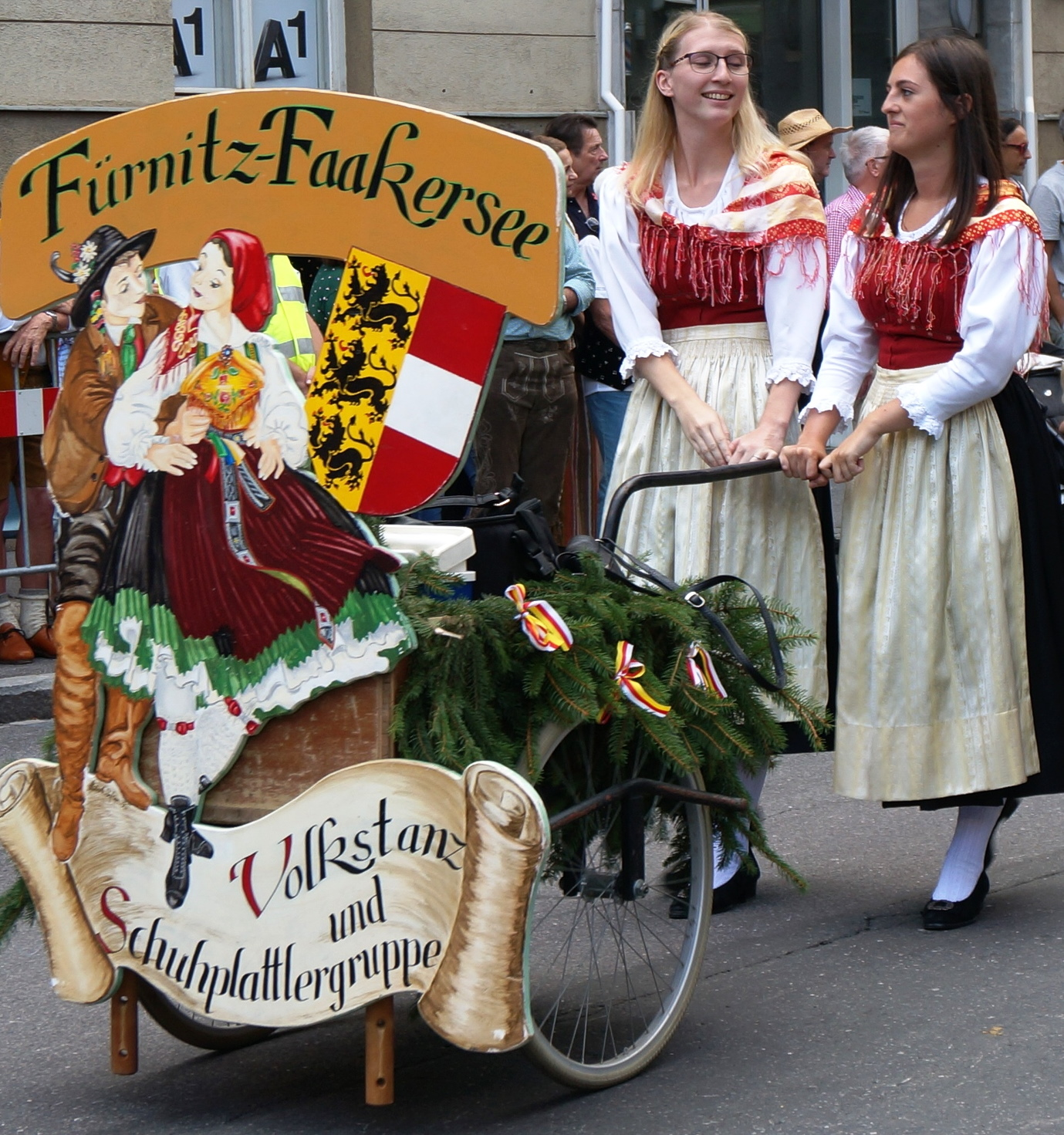
Traditional costume of the Volks- and Schuhplattlergruppe from Faakersee in Carinthia, Austria

Folk costume also continues to be worn for most weddings and festivals. Old traditions are carefully maintained among inhabitants of Alpine areas, even though this is seldom obvious to the visitor: many people are members of cultural associations where the Alpine folk culture is cultivated. At cultural events, the traditional dirndl is the expected dress for women. Visitors can get a glimpse of the rich customs of the Alps at public Volksfeste. Even when large events feature only a little folk culture, all participants take part with gusto. Good opportunities to see local people celebrating the traditional culture occur at the many fairs, wine festivals and firefighting festivals which fill weekends in the Austrian countryside from spring to autumn. Only in the region surrounding Vienna is the traditional folk culture not a regular part of daily life.

Some regions are particularly known for their strong dirndl traditions, such as the Tyrol, the Salzkammergut and the Wachau region of Lower Austria.

In Austria, the dirndl is a symbol of national identity, seen in Austria as a national symbol. In tourist settings, staff in offices, restaurants, wineries and shops often wear dirndls as a work uniform; this is also the case in the non-Alpine regions in the east of Austria. Even in everyday life, many Austrian women wear dirndls as an alternative to other fashions.

Festivals at which dirndls are expected dress include festivities for raising the Maypole on 1 May, the Narzissenfest (daffodil festival) during May in Bad Aussee, the Salzburg Festival and the Ausseer Kirtag in September. Styles are both less extravagant and show less décolletage than at Oktoberfest.

In Austria, and other parts of south central Europe, there are literally splashy events known as Dirndlspringen, in which attractive young women, are judged by how well they jump, or even just step, from a diving board into a lake or a swimming pool while wearing the dirndl, using it as a swimdress.

=== Germany ===
In Germany, the dirndl is traditionally worn only in Bavaria, where it is deeply integrated in the traditional culture. For instance, dirndls are traditionally worn by women attending formal ceremonies of the Catholic church. In many Bavarian villages, processions to honour St George and St Leonard are special occasions for wearing Alpine tracht. The traditional dirndl is also the normal attire of women attending events associated with Alpine folk culture. Volksfeste often feature events at which traditional dirndls from regions are worn, as illustrated in the photo on the right. In all of these activities, the dirndls normally worn are the traditional local designs, considered most suitable for formal occasions. Modern commercially designed dirndls are worn on less formal occasions.

The traditional designs are promoted by and protected by local folk culture associations affiliated with the Bayerische Trachtenverband (Bavarian folk costume association). The designs specify the traditional materials, patterns and colours of clothing, together with jewellery, hats, etc. Currently, six official types of Alpine tracht are recognized in Bavaria, each with designs for men (lederhosen) and women (dirndl): Miesbacher Tracht, Werdenfelser Tracht, Inntaler Tracht, Chiemgauer Tracht, Berchtesgadener Tracht and Isarwinkler Tracht.

The dirndl is regarded as a symbol of Bavaria. It is often worn by women working in businesses related to tourism or traditional culture, including Volksmusik, restaurants and beer gardens.

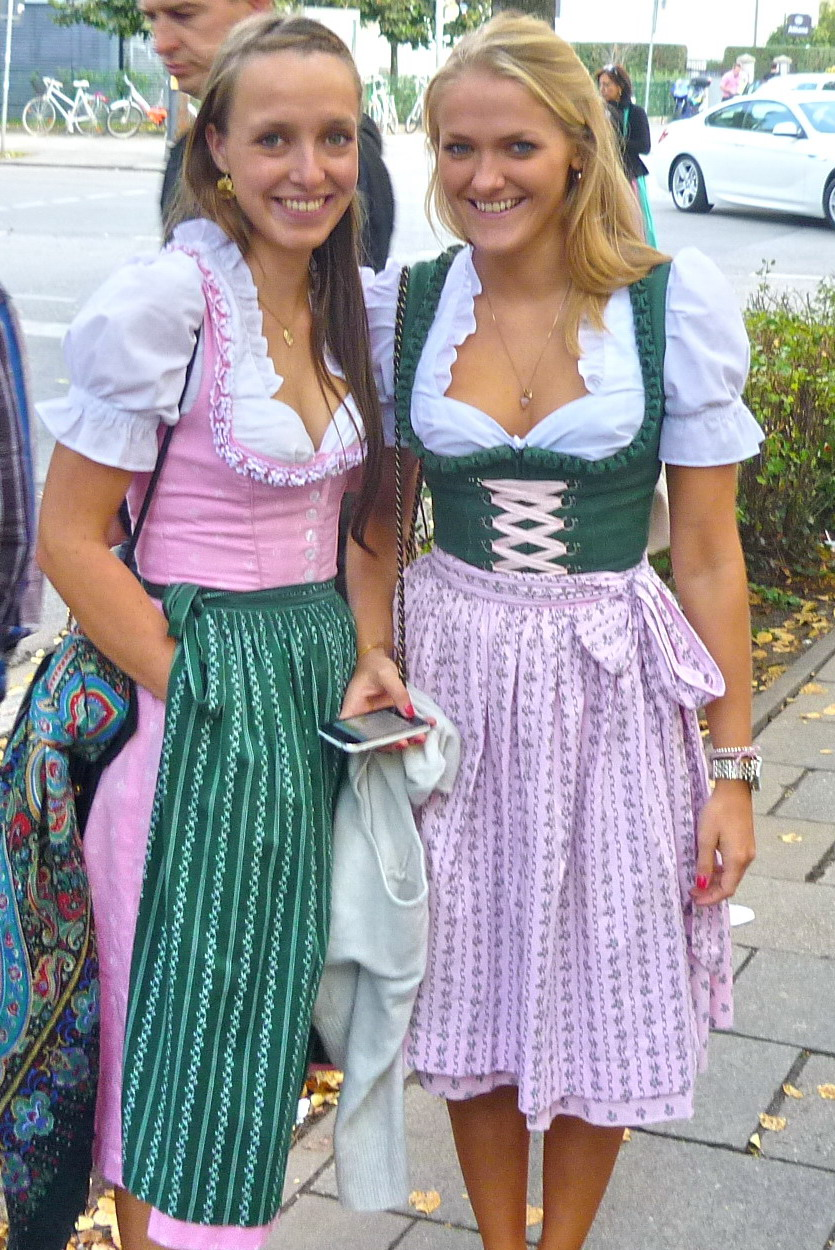
Visitors to Oktoberfest wearing dirndls, 2012

In recent decades, women from other parts of Germany have shown increasing interest in the dirndl as a festival dress. This is especially evident in changing fashions at Oktoberfest, the world's largest Volksfest. Until the 1970s, most visitors to Oktoberfest did not wear traditional tracht; it was common to wear jeans. Since the late 1990s dirndls and Lederhosen have come to be regarded as obligatory wear at the festival. The name Wiesntracht is given to dirndls and other tracht clothing worn for Oktoberfest (Wiesn refers to the Theresienwiese, where the Oktoberfest events occur). Oktoberfest dirndls tend to be more colourful and revealing. Skirts are often above the knee, and deep décolletage is very frequent. In 2005, gossip magazine Bunte reported that at Munich Airport there was a place which was always important for fashion observers at Oktoberfest time: the women's toilets in Domestic Arrivals. "There the ladies who have flown in wearing street clothes with shouldered clothes-bags vanish – and appear from Baggage Collection in full dirndl bloom. Because they don´t trust themselves to board the aircraft as Bavarians, but arriving in Munich not dressed for the Wiesn would be unseemly."

Germans are increasingly coming to view the dirndl as a German cultural symbol, not just a Bavarian one. In the past few years, Oktoberfest has increasingly been adopted as an autumn celebration in parts of Germany several hundred km from Bavaria, such as Hagen in Westphalia or Eckernförde in Schleswig-Holstein; dirndls and lederhosen are now considered an intrinsic part of such events. In a recent German-English dictionary, the authors comment: "The Dirndl, the traditional Bavarian national dress for women, is enjoying growing popularity amongst young people during the Oktoberfest season, even beyond the Bavarian boundaries. It has become a fashion statement to wear a Dirndl even at the many local Volksfeste, such as the Cannstatter Wasen in Stuttgart, where a Dirndl has no tradition at all." Other evidence is the successful marketing of dirndls in the German national colours for wearing at football matches, noticeable at the 2006 FIFA World Cup. Meanwhile, high-end German fashion houses are designing and selling their own designs.

=== Italy ===
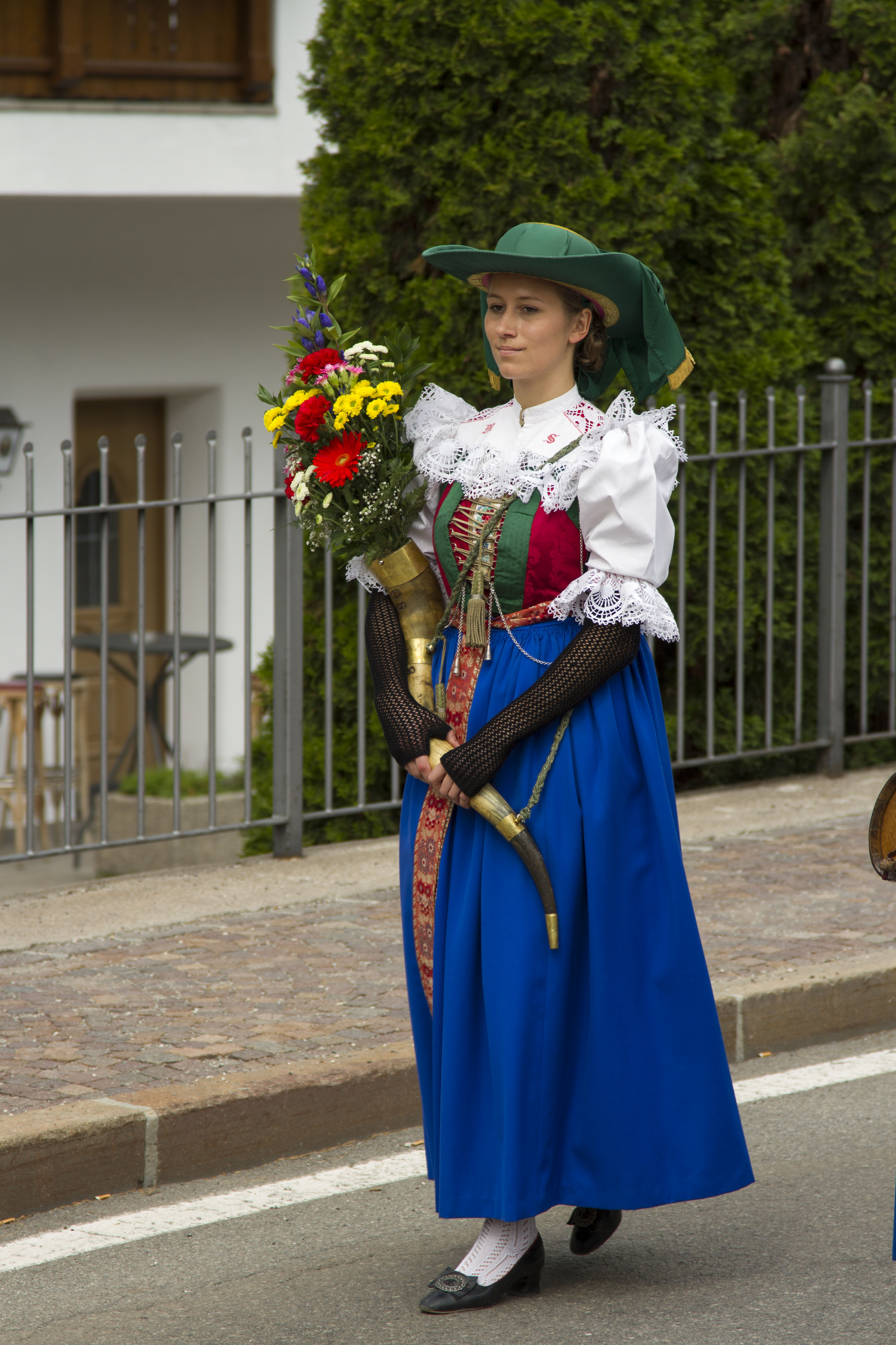
Young woman wearing traditional dirndl during sacramental procession, Seis am Schlern, South Tyrol, 2014

In Italy the dirndl is part of the traditional clothing culture in the Alpine province of South Tyrol (German: Südtirol; Italian: Alto Adige). The region was part of the Austrian county of Tyrol before the First World War, but was ceded to Italy in 1919 in the Treaty of St-Germain at the end of the war. In South Tyrol, both German and Italian are official languages, and Tyrolean traditions including the dirndl remain deeply integrated in the culture. The dress is worn on festive occasions, such as processions of the Catholic church. Traditional designs vary between regions, valleys and sometimes villages.

The local dirndls and lederhosen are displayed in several local museums. There are permanent exhibitions at the South Tyrolean Folklore Museum in Dietenheim, the Steinegg Local Museum and the Bolzano Municipal Museum. Public events featuring folk costume include the Val Gardena folklore festival ("Gröden in Tracht") and the Country Wedding in Kastelruth.

=== Liechtenstein ===
Folk costumes for women in Liechtenstein correspond to the definition of a "dirndl" in English, although the local tracht association (Liechtensteinische Trachtenvereinigung) discourages the name "dirndl". The official national dress of Liechtenstein features a black skirt and a white blouse with crocheted and bobbin laced necklines and sleeves. Bodices and aprons are made of silk; their traditional colour was red, but modern designs often substitute blue or green. As worn for national dress, the bodice is decorated with silver embroidery featuring a princely crown in the middle of the bodice. Accessories include a black wheel-shaped bonnet featuring silver embroidery, white lace gloves, white stockings and black shoes with a silver buckle. Other variations include floral headbands (Schappile) or crown-shaped headpieces (Krönle).

The current designs have been in use since at least the 1930s, but their origins can be traced much earlier. Similar designs have been found in archaeological remains from Vaduz, Gamprin and Eschen. Especially notable is an excavated church graveyard in Mauren from around 1700, which included well-preserved garments and a bonnet.

=== Switzerland ===
The Swiss refer to an Austrian or German traditional dress as a dirndl, but refer to their own traditional dress as a tracht. As is the case in the neighboring country of Liechtenstein, the use of the term dirndl for a Swiss dress is discouraged. The style varies by region, for example a Bernese Tracht. These are worn during festivities on Swiss National Day (August 1) or during seasonal celebrations which vary by canton, such as at harvest time or the end of winter.

In the canton of Zürich, the imminent end of winter is celebrated by the Sechseläuten festival. The name comes from Swiss dialect referring to the town crier ringing six o'clock. Organizations descended from medieval guilds show their colors. Parades feature members wearing traditional costumes. The festivities culminate with the burning of a large snowman made of straw. How long it takes his head to explode indicates whether the coming summer will be cool or hot.

=== In the German diaspora ===
Outside its countries of origin, the dirndl has become an ethnic costume, worn as an identity marker by members of the German diaspora. This term refers to German-speakers and their descendants who live in countries where German is a minority language.

Germans, Austrian, Swiss and Scandinavian people migrated to North America in the 19th century. Germans made a strong contribution to the gene pool of Montana, Minnesota, the Dakotas, Missouri, Texas, Wisconsin, New York City and Chicago. The German American ethnic group (German: Deutschamerikaner) are their descendants in North America, and form part of the worldwide German diaspora.

Beginning in 1920 and especially after World War II, many Danube Swabians migrated to Argentina, Australia, Austria, Brazil, Canada, Mexico, and the United States. Across the United States there are dozens of German-American cultural or heritage clubs, such as the Donauschwaben heritage clubs. The clubs host events and festivals (such as Von Steuben Day parades) to preserve and celebrate their heritage with the surrounding communities. During these festivals, participants often dress in traditional outfits such as dirndls and lederhosen.

Dirndls and lederhosen are also worn as party clothing at Oktoberfest celebrations around the world. This is especially the case when the celebration takes place in a German diaspora community, such as the Oktoberfest celebrations at Colonia Tovar in Venezuela, the Fiesta Nacional de la Cerveza in Villa General Belgrano, Argentina, and the Pozuzofest in Pozuzo, Peru.

== In popular culture ==
=== Films featuring dirndl costumes ===
- Above Suspicion (1943)
- Almost Angels
- Charlie's Angels
- Chitty Chitty Bang Bang
- Ferris Bueller's Day Off
- Heidi (1937) and (1968)
- Heidi's Song
- The Legend of Silent Night
- Lissi und der wilde Kaiser
- The Merry Wives of Tyrol
- Miss Congeniality
- The Monastery's Hunter (1935)
- The Mouse That Roared
- National Lampoon's European Vacation
- The Pink Panther (1963)
- The Pink Panther Strikes Again
- The Producers
- Salzburg Stories (1957)
- Sissi
- Snow White and the Seven Dwarfs
- The Sound of Music
- Summer in Tyrol
- Tangled
- The Trapp Family
- The Trapp Family in America
- The Violin Maker of Mittenwald
- Where Eagles Dare
- The White Horse Inn (1926), (1948), (1952) and (1960)

=== In philately ===
The Austrian postal service regularly issues postage stamps featuring dirndls and other Austrian folk costumes. The stamp series is released under the title Klassische Trachten (classic folk costumes). In April 2020, the 85 cent stamp featured the blue printed dirndl worn as everyday workwear in the Wachauer Tracht tradition. In 2016, the postal office issued a novelty stamp featuring an embroidered dirndl; only 140,000 specimens were issued.

== See also ==
- Austrian folk dancing
- Kirtle
- Lederhosen
- Schuhplattler
- Tracht
- Folk costume
- Volksfest
- Oktoberfest

== Bibliography ==
- Egger, Simone (2008). Phänomen Wiesntracht. Identitätspraxen einer urbanen Gesellschaft. Dirndl und Lederhosen, München und das Oktoberfest. Munich: Herbert Utz. ISBN 978-3-8316-0831-7.
- Egger, Simone (2023). "Changing Perspectives: The Dirndl—A Contemporary Topic of Urban Ethnography". In Weber, A. Dana (ed.). Former Neighbors, Future Allies?: German Studies and Ethnography in Dialogue. Berghahn Books. pp. 267–284. ISBN 978-1-80073-897-3.
- Greger, Michael J. and Johann Verhovsek: Viktor Geramb 1884–1958. Leben und Werk. Verlag des Vereins für Volkskunde, Vienna 2007, ISBN 978-3-900358-27-3. (in German)
- Guenther, Irene (2010). Nazi chic?: Fashioning women in the Third Reich. Oxford: Berg. ISBN 978-1-8597-3400-1.
- Hollmer, Heide and Kathrin Hollmer: Dirndl. Trends, Traditionen, Philosophie, Pop, Stil, Styling. Edition Ebersbach, Berlin 2011. ISBN 978-3-86915-043-7 (in German)
- Lipp, Franz C., Elisabeth Längle, Gexi Tostmann, Franz Hubmann (eds.): Tracht in Österreich. Geschichte und Gegenwart. Brandstätter, Vienna, 1984, ISBN 3-85447-028-2. (in German)
- Müller, Daniela and Susanne Trettenbrein: Alles Dirndl. Anton Pustet Verlag, Salzburg 2013. ISBN 978-3-7025-0693-3. (in German)
- Pesendorfer, Gertrud: Neue deutsche Bauerntrachten. Tirol. Callwey, Munich, 1938. (in German)
- Radakovich, Uta: Trachten in Südtirol, Reverdito, 2009, ISBN 978-8863140361. (in German)
- Reuter, Ulrich: Kleidung zwischen Tracht + Mode. Aus der Geschichte des Museums 1889–1989. Museum für Volkskunde, Berlin, 1989. (in German)
- Rosenberg, Amelia (April 2018). Folk Art and Ancestry: German Jewish Creation through Time (PDF). Proceedings of The National Conference On Undergraduate Research.
- Ständecke, Monika (2007). Dirndl, Truhen, Edelweiss: die Volkskunst der Brüder Wallach / Dirndls, Trunks, and Edelweiss. The Folk Art of the Wallach Brothers. Munich: Jüdisches Museum. ISBN 978-3-9388-3220-2.
- Ständecke, Monika (2008). "Das Volkskunsthaus Wallach in München". Jahrbuch für Europäische Ethnologie - Neue Folge. Im Auftrag der Görres-Gesellschaft. pp. 65–90. doi:10.30965/9783657766901_005. ISBN 978-3-506-76690-8.
- Tostmann, Gexi (1990). The dirndl: With instructions. Vienna: Panorama. ISBN 978-3-8505-7001-5.
- Tostmann, Gexi (1998). Das Dirndl: Alpenländische Tradition und Mode. Vienna: Christian Brandstätter. ISBN 978-3-8544-7781-5.
- Wallach, Moritz (1961). Das Volkskunsthaus Wallach in Muenchen. Lime Rock, CT: LBI Memoir Collection.
- Wallnöfer, Elsbeth: Geraubte Tradition. Wie die Nazis unsere Kultur verfälschten. Sankt Ulrich-Verlag, Augsburg 2011, ISBN 978-3-8674-4194-0. (in German)
- Weber, Christianne and Renate Moller. Mode und Modeschmuck 1920–1970 / Fashion and Jewelry 1920–1970. Arnoldsche Verlagsanstalt, 1999. ISBN 978-3-9253-6923-0. (in German, with English translation)
- Weissengruber, Thekla (2004). Zwischen Pflege und Kommerz: Studien zum Umgang mit Trachten in Österreich nach 1945. Münster: Lit-Verlag.
