= Zwiefacher =

German folk dance

A demonstration of the s' Luada Zwiefacher at Pinewoods Dance Camp.

The Zwiefacher (German pronunciation: [ˈtsviːfaxɐ]) is a southern German folk dance with a quick tempo and changing beat patterns.

== Location ==
The Zwiefacher is danced primarily in Bavaria, especially Lower Bavaria, Hallertau, and Upper Palatinate; it is also known in the Black Forest, Austria, Alsace, the Czech Republic, and Sudetenland.

== Name ==
The first documented use of the word Zwiefach was in 1780. It loosely translates as "two times" or "double". Although this may be indicative of the two different time signatures, the title may refer to the couple being tightly wound against each other, a departure from earlier traditions. The dance is still known by various other names in different regions, such as Schweinauer, Schleifer, Übern Fuaß, Mischlich, Grad und Ungrad, Neu-Bayerischer and, above all Bairischer (meaning "Farmer Dance", a name sometimes confused with the Bavarian polka).

The number of different names for the same dance should not be surprising, as the dance is older than the modern German language. Neither should one be surprised that the tunes themselves have multiple names. One German dance researcher, Felix Hoerburger, catalogued 112 different Zwiefacher tunes with 474 different names.

== Rhythm ==
The Zwiefacher alternates between odd and even time signatures, changing from three to two beats per bar. The changes may occur regularly - for example, two measures per time signature, may change only once or may change irregularly throughout. Early Zwiefachers were played before the modern bar line was invented.

== Choreography ==
The couple turns very quickly in a closed position, similar to the waltz. Physically, the rhythmic shift looks like a change from normal waltz steps to Dreher steps (pivots), occasionally also to polka steps.

== Lyrics ==
Lyrics were often created as a mnemonic device to help learn Zwiefachers melodies by heart. This led to many songtexts for the same melodies. New lyrics are still sometimes used together with old melodies, as in the McDonald's parody "Hunger kriag I glei" by "Bayrisch-Diatonischer Jodelwahnsinn", which uses the same music as the "Suserl-Zwiefache".

== Examples in European classical music ==
- Carl Orff composed one dance of his Carmina Burana in the Zwiefacher form.
- The Furiant in act two of Bedřich Smetana's The Bartered Bride is a variant of the Zwiefacher.
- In Telemann's “Kleine Kammermusik” of 1716, in the B-flat major suite, Aria 6 is a Zwiefacher.

== Examples ==
- Eisenkeilnest (https://www.dancilla.com/wiki/index.php/Eisenkeilnest)
- S'Luada (https://www.dancilla.com/wiki/index.php/S%27Luada)
- Wiggerl Zwiefacher sheet music (https://www.folkloretanznoten.de/Wiggerl_Zwiefacher.pdf)
- Lercherl Zwiefacher (see the external links section)

== See also ==
- Austrian folk dances
- Austrian folk dancing
- Ländler
- Schuhplattler
- German Wikipedia Zwiefacher page
