= Ländler =

18th-century folk dance

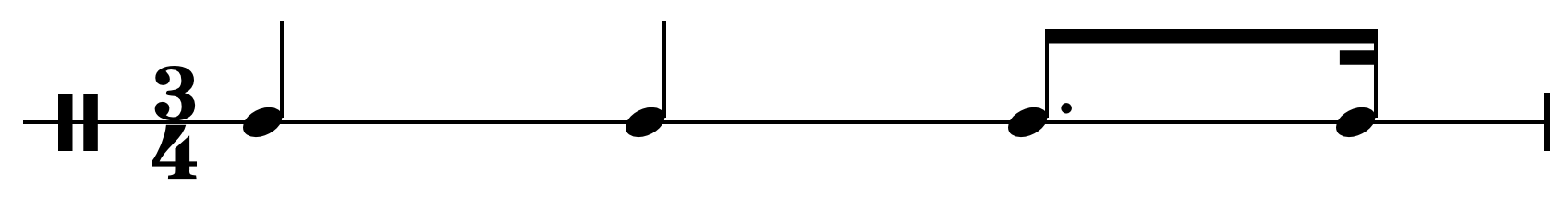
Ländler rhythm

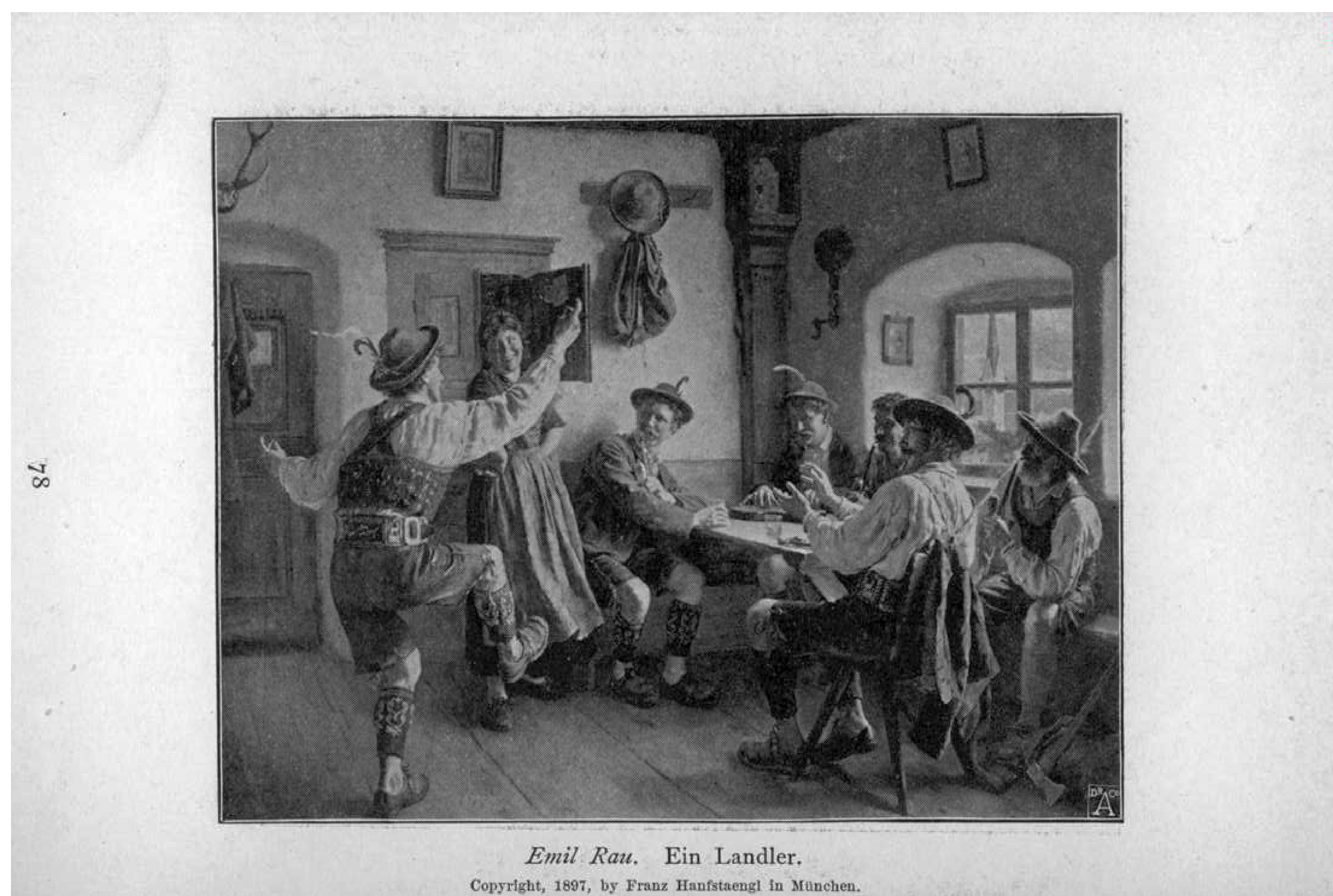
Ein Ländler (1897)

The Ländler (German pronunciation: [ˈlɛntlɐ]) is a European folk dance in 3/4 time. Along with the waltz and allemande, the ländler was sometimes referred to by the generic term German Dance in publications during the late 18th and early 19th centuries. Despite its association with Germany, the ländler was danced in many European countries. Composers from a variety of European nations wrote music for the ländler dance; including Austria, Switzerland, Bohemia, Moravia, Slovenia and northern Italy in addition to Germany.

== History ==
The ländler is a partner dance that strongly features hopping and stamping. It might be purely instrumental or have a vocal part, sometimes featuring yodeling.

When dance halls became popular in Europe in the 19th century, the Ländler was made quicker and more elegant, and the men shed the hobnail boots that they wore to dance it. Along with a number of other folk dances from Germany and Bohemia, it is thought to have influenced the development of the waltz.

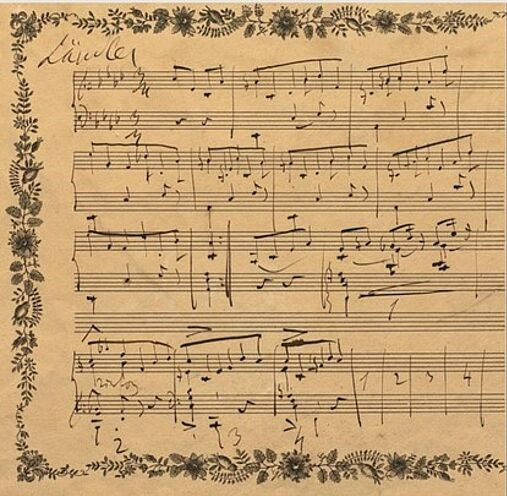
Autograph manuscript of Liszt's Ländler in A-flat major, S. 211

A number of classical composers wrote or included Ländler in their music, including Ludwig van Beethoven, Franz Schubert and Anton Bruckner. In several of his symphonies, Gustav Mahler replaced the menuet with a Ländler. The Carinthian folk tune quoted in Alban Berg's Violin Concerto is a Ländler, and another features in Act II of his opera Wozzeck. The "German Dances" of Wolfgang Amadeus Mozart and Joseph Haydn also resemble Ländler. Josef Lanner (1801–1843) wrote several Ländlers. He, along with Johann Strauss I and Johann Strauss II, helped popularize the waltz in Vienna and elsewhere. The Johann Strauss II waltz Tales from the Vienna Woods features a zither playing in the style of a Ländler. Britten's Peter Grimes features a Ländler in the scene where a dance night is occurring in the hall.

The Sound of Music Broadway musical, the film, and the American and British live TV broadcasts (The Sound of Music Live! (2013) and The Sound of Music Live (2015)) all feature a scene where the protagonists Maria and Captain von Trapp dance a Ländler. The instrumental tune used in that sequence is a 3/4-time rearrangement of the more polka-like "The Lonely Goatherd". Compare this one to the "Dornbacher" Ländler by Lanner, and one will hear many similarities. The choreographers for the motion picture researched the traditional Austrian folk dance and integrated it into the choreography of the Ländler danced in the film.

== See also ==
- Austrian folk dances
- Austrian folk dancing
- Fandango
- Mazurka
- Music of Austria
- Polonaise (dance)
- Polska (dance)
- Schuhplattler
- Zwiefacher
