= Schuhplattler =

Austrian and Bavarian folk dance

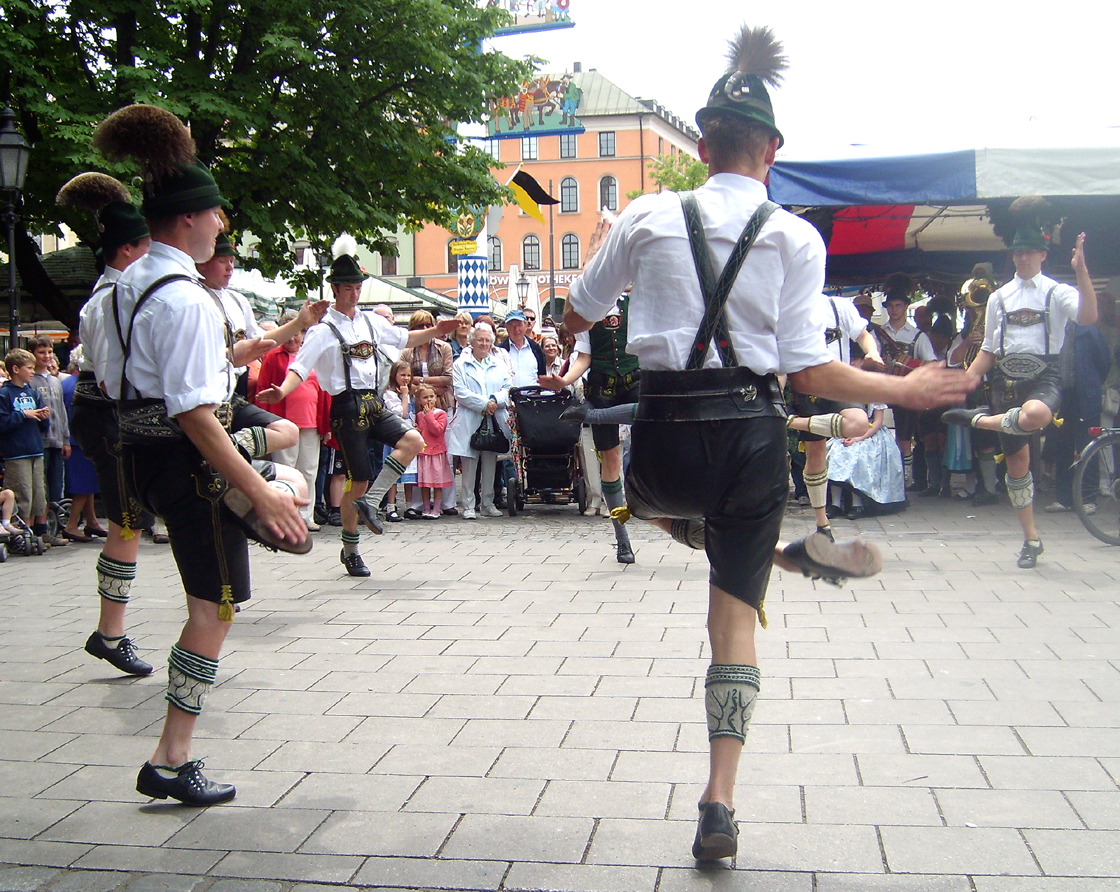
- Schuhplattler group in Munich
- Genre: Social dance, folk dance
- Time signature: 3/4
- Origin: Eastern Alps, namely Upper Bavaria, Tyrol, and Salzburg

The Schuhplattler is a traditional style of folk dance popular in the Eastern Alps, specifically originating in Upper Bavaria, Tyrol, and Salzburg. In this dance, the performers stomp, clap, and strike the soles of their shoes (Schuhe), thighs, and knees with their hands held flat (platt). The more than 150 basic Schuhplattlers, as well as marches and acrobatic feats, are often interspersed with the basic dance in performance. They may be seen today in Europe and in German-immigrant communities around the world. While the Schuhplattler is still largely performed by adults, it has become increasingly popular with youngsters, who love its colorful costumes and its bouncing, leaping, kicking, and choreographed horseplay.

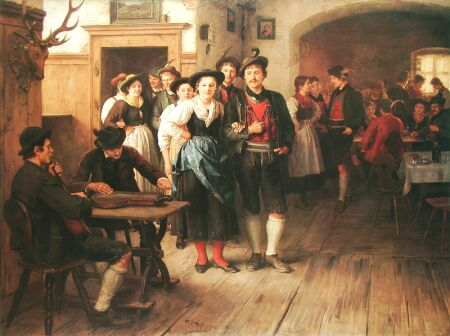
Vor dem Tanz: Franz Defregger (1835–1921)

== History and style ==
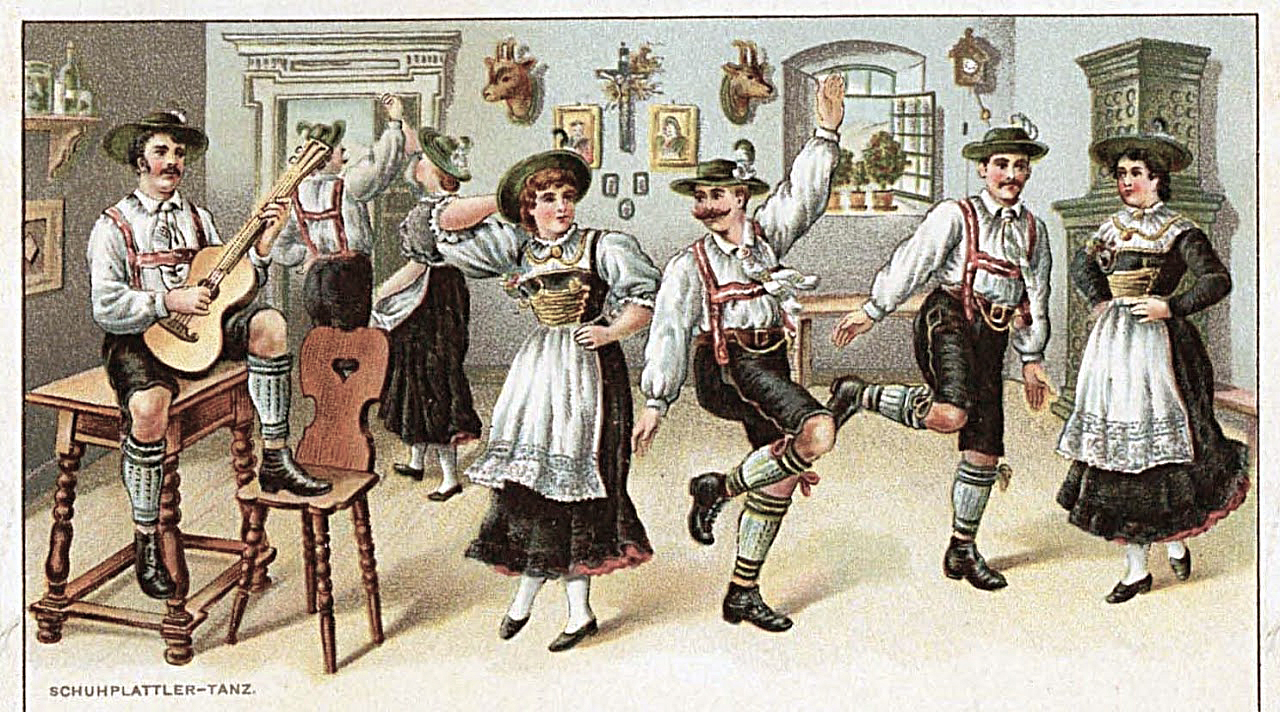
Schuhplattler postcard, 1901

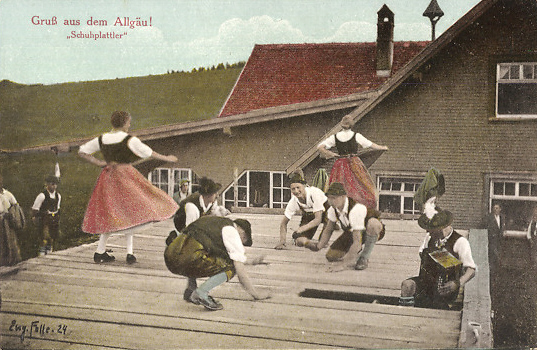
Schuhplattler postcard, 1924

One of the earliest accounts of the Schuhplattler may date from 1030 AD, when a monk in the Tegernsee Abbey of Bavaria described a village dance containing leaps and hand gestures. Over the centuries, the form gradually evolved as farmers, hunters, and woodsmen practiced it in the isolated towns and villages of the Bavarian and Tyrolean Alps. Sometimes, it was performed as a partner dance, with couples doing a Ländler and then splitting up so the girls could twirl in their colorful Dirndln as the boys showed off their Platteln. At other times, just the boys were onstage, arranged in a circle, square, or line, plattling wildly for the audience. These two approaches are sometimes distinguished as the Schuhplattlertanz and Schuhplattler proper, but the "boys' dance" is at the core of both forms and is most often described.

The immediate precursors of today's Schuhplatter were the 18th-century minuet, quadrille, and Française, but unlike these courtly and highly stylized dances, the early Plattlers of the common folk were free of rules. The young men improvised their leaps, stomps, and acrobatic figures "as it struck their fancy." Acrobatics were an important part of the dance at least by the 1820s, when boys began balancing on the shoulders of their partners and stamping their feet rhythmically on the ceiling!

Early Schuhplattlers often highlighted the towns where they were invented or imitated the various professions of the performers, such as the Mühlradl (miller's dance), the Holzhacker (wood cutter), and the Glockenplattler (bell dance). The music was generally in three-quarter time, like the Ländler, and was performed on the zither or the guitar, and by 1830s, the accordion or concertina.

In 1838, the Empress of Russia was honored with a Schuhplattler by the residents of the bath town of Wildbad Kreuth, and the aristocracy, fascinated by the strange costumes and quaint pursuits of the common folk, began taking an interest in the dance. Many consider the real birth of the modern Schuhplattler, however, to be King Maximilian II of Bavaria's excursion through the Alps in 1858, when locals performed the dance for him, and he fell in love with it.

In 1886, French traveler Hugues Krafft wrote of the Schuhplattler:

On Sundays and holidays one sees couples dancing to music on larger town squares everywhere—preferably the Ländler, a leisurely waltz popular among girls and boys. The biggest attraction, however, even for the local farmers, is always the Schuhplatter. It ... begins with forming a circle. Then, while the girl is briefly separated from her partner and continues to follow waltz steps, the boy must perform a number of difficult movements to the beat of the music. He turns around on his axis, slaps his thighs and legs, falls to his knees, jumps in the air and throws his hat as he lets out a joyful whoop... Those who master the dance are cheered with vigorous applause.

By the late 19th century, traditional costume clubs (Trachtenvereine) were being established throughout Bavaria and Tyrol, and soon these groups spread to German communities in America and elsewhere. Since the mission of these clubs was to preserve the age-old customs, lore, and dress of the German and Austrian Alps, the Schuhplattler became a central part of their programs. The Trachtenvereine were often strict and exacting about how the dance was to be performed and how club members were to dress, although new Schuhplattler groups sprang up after the second world war that were less tied to the older forms.

== Costume ==
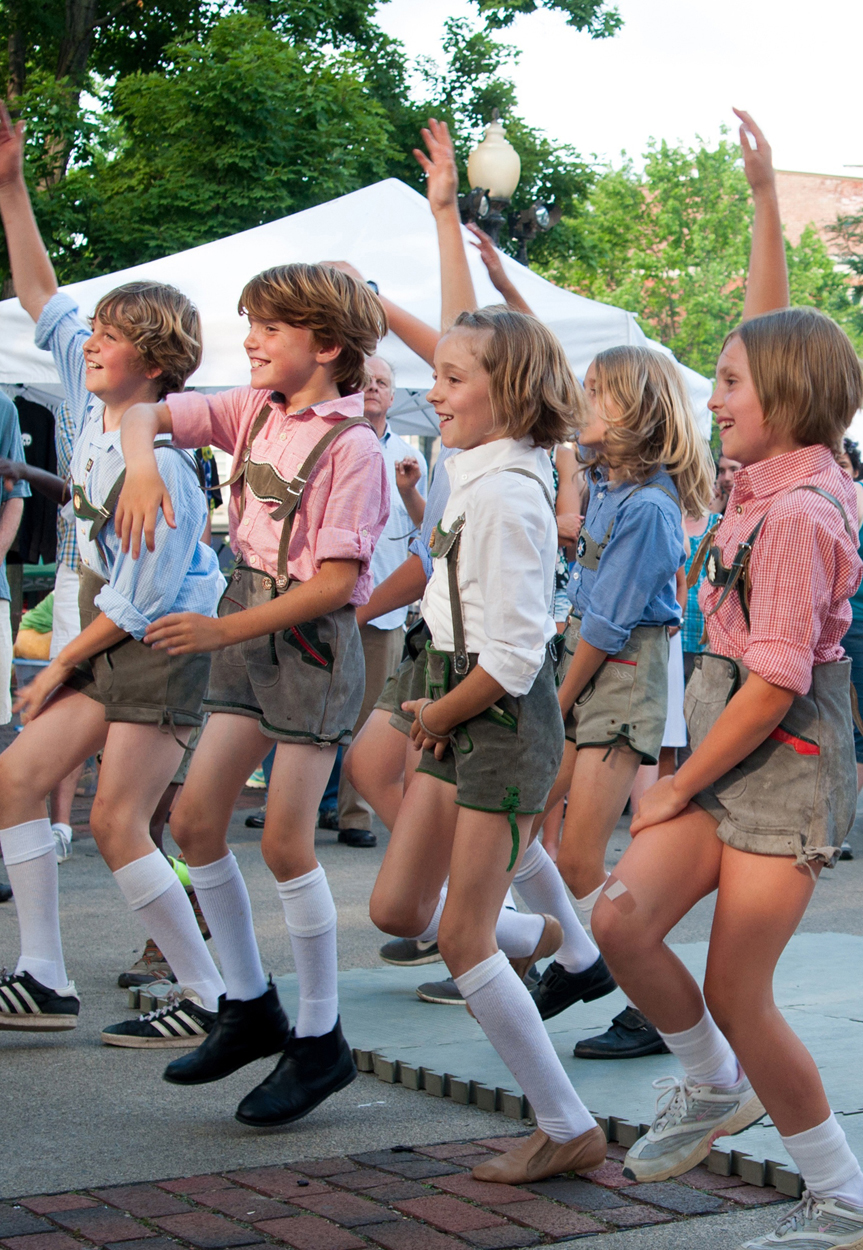
River Valley Schuhplattler, Bucks County, Pennsylvania

For the Schuhplattler, lederhosen and dirndls are a must. These range from the simple, practical styles that have been worn in Bavaria and Tyrol for generations to the finest ornate varieties that can cost a thousand dollars or more. Kniebund Lederhosen (knickers) are worn by some Schuhplatter groups, but they can be uncomfortable to dance in, especially in warm weather. More common are short lederhosen, which range from the knee-length version favored by traditionalist groups and Munich Oktoberfest visitors to the much shorter variety worn in South Tyrol. While European scouts have always worn lederhosen without suspenders, costume and dance groups wear either standard narrow H-bar suspenders or the wider, heavily embroidered, fancy-dress variety. Socks are knee length in solid gray, green or white. Loferl-style socks are ankle-length and have a separate band that goes around the calf.

The dirndl emerged during the 18th century as a plain, practical servant's dress with a long skirt, bodice, blouse, and apron. In the wintertime, it was made of heavy cotton, linen, or wool with long sleeves, and in summer, it was short-sleeved and of lighter material. In the second half of the 19th century, as the Schuhplattler and lederhosen became fashionable amongst the nobility, dirndls evolved into stylish attire made of silk or satin for the very rich. Their popularity has risen and fallen over the years, but like lederhosen, the dirndl has lately had something of a resurgence in Germany and Austria.

== The Schuhplattler today ==
Traditionalist Trachtenvereine around the world still perform the Schuhplattler as a partner dance, with the women spinning across the stage in their dirndls, offering color and graceful movement to counterbalance the leaping and slapping of the plattlerists. The newer dance groups, on the other hand, are often composed entirely of plattlerists. They, too, perform the standard Schuhplattlers, but they do so with a contemporary energy and excitement that draws in the crowds.

Among these contemporary groups are some top-notch children's clubs like the Oberbairing Kinder and the Jungen Wimberger, that are often associated with adult clubs but perform in festivals and competitions on their own. Like their adult counterparts, they dance not only with precision but also with a zest and enthusiasm that can leave audiences cheering.

== Russian folk dance ==
A similar dance technique exists in the Russian folk dance, only that in Russian dance the male dancers stomp, clap and strike in addition to sole, front of the foot, thighs, knees also the chest. It is made at a faster pace in Russian folk dance.

== See also ==
- Austrian folk dancing
- Chicken Dance
- Hopak—A similar Ukrainian folk dance
- Music of Austria
