= Austrian folk dance =

Type of dance

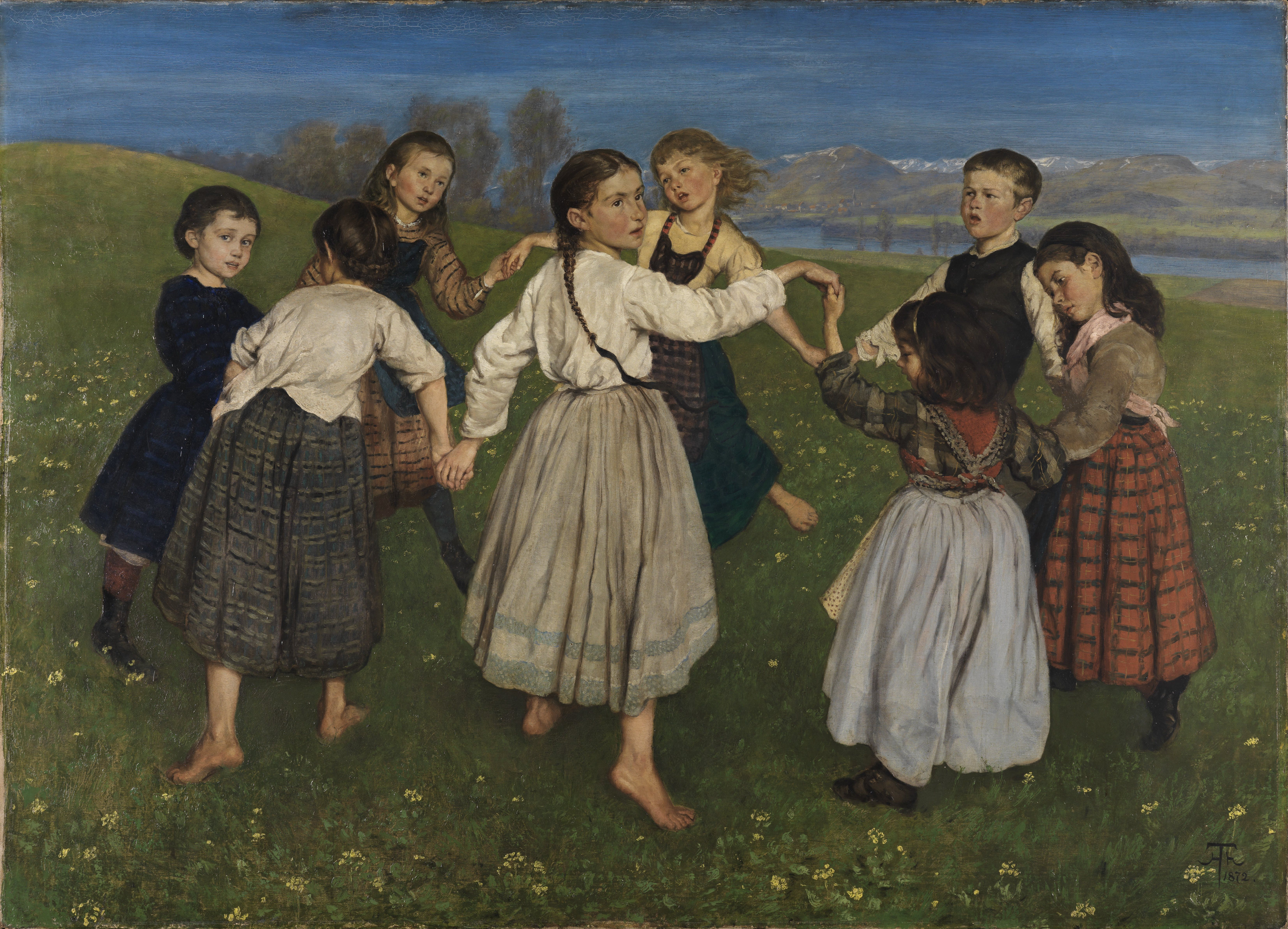
Der Kinderreigen (1872) by Hans Thoma shows children engaged in a circle dance

Austrian folk dancing is mostly associated with Schuhplattler, Ländler, polka and waltz. However, there are other dances such as Zwiefacher, Kontratänze and Sprachinseltänze.

== Types of dance ==
In Austria, folk dances in general are known as Folkloretänze, i.e. "folklore dances", whereas the Austrian type of folk dance is known as Volkstanz (literally "folk dance").

Figure dancing is a type of dance where different figures are put together with a certain tune and given a name. Round dancing, which includes the waltz, the polka, Zwiefacher etc., involves basic steps which can be danced to different tunes. In folk dancing, the waltz and the polka are in a different form to standard ballroom dancing.

Sprachinseltänze (literally "language island dances") are those dances which are actually by German-speaking minorities (see German as a Minority Language) living outside Austria, but which originate in Austria, e.g. those of Transylvania. One example of this type of dance is the Rediwaire.

== Misconceptions ==
There are some misconceptions about Austrian folk tradition:

- The "Ländler", as performed in the film The Sound of Music, is not a traditional Ländler, but a choreographed derivative of this Austrian form of folk dance.
- The "Chicken Dance" is not an Austrian folk dance, nor is it from Austria.
- The song "Edelweiss" is not an Austrian folk song, and it is not the national anthem of Austria. The national anthem of Austria is "Land der Berge, Land am Strome". "Edelweiss" was created specifically for The Sound of Music.

== Festivals ==
Austrian folk dance festivals follow a common sequence:

- everybody gets onto the dance floor and dances the opening round
- a welcoming speech is made
- waltzes are danced in blocks, with breaks in between.
- finally a special dance, often with a goodbye song.

Viennese festivals usually have four long sets of dances, with long breaks and figure dancing in between. Other parts of Austria have a larger number of shorter blocks (three to five dances each) with shorter breaks between them, and more figure dancing.

Though attended only by a tradition-minded minority, Vienna folk dance events are carefully organized events often taking place at extraordinary locations, such as, the Alpenverein, the Autumn Dance at baroque Belvedere (palace), the Ländler dances (the traditional music of which bears the rhythm from which in the 19th century the Vienna waltz music was developed), and the summer dances which take place twice each week during summer holiday season (July and August).

== Musical instruments ==
Typical instruments for Austrian folk dance are the Styrian harmonica (a type of accordion), the fiddle, the clarinet, the harp, the flute and brass bands. Dances are often accompanied by the contrabass or the guitar. Unlike modern Austrian folk-pop music, drums are not used.

== Folk dances ==
- Boarischer
- Eiswalzer
- Hiatamadl
- Jägermarsch
- Krebspolka
- Kreuzpolka
- Kuckuckspolka
- Ländler
- Lunzer Boarischer
- Mazurka
- Neudeutscher
- Polka
- Poschater Zwoaschritt
- Rediwa (Sprachinseltanz)
- Rheinländer
- Schuhplattler
- Siebenschritt
- Studentenpolka
- Waltz
- Zwiefacher

== See also ==
- Folk dancing and Folk dance
- Folk music
- Music of Austria
