= Kirnbach (Wolfach) =

- Stadtteil of Wolfach
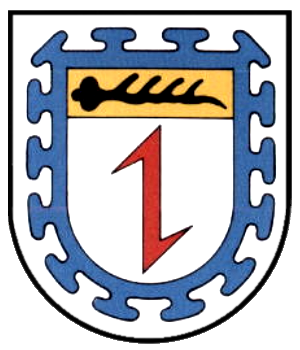
- Coat of arms
- Interactive map of Kirnbach
- Location within Germany Location within Baden-Württemberg
- Coordinates: 48°15′46″N 8°14′40″E
- Country: Germany
- State: Baden-Württemberg
- Town: Wolfach
- Elevation: 250–880 m (820–2,890 ft)
- Time zone: UTC+01:00 (CET)
  - Summer (DST): UTC+02:00 (CEST)
- Postal codes: 77709
- Dialling codes: 07834

Kirnbach is a village in the municipality of Wolfach in the district of Ortenaukreis, Baden-Württemberg. Kirnbach is a dispersed settlement with many farms along the little river Kirnbach.

== Subdivisions ==
- Untertal (Altvogtshof, Faißteshof, Hasenhof, Hildadeshof, Jockeleshof, Josenbauer, Kehretleshof, Konradleshof, Krumershof, Ober- und Unterwirtshaus, Ober- und Unterwöhrleshof, Rotecke, Schillingershof, Vogtsadeshof, Vogtsjörgenhof, Winterberg),
- Obertal (Aberleshof, Hirschwirtshaus, Sägerhof),
- Grafenloch (Ritterhof, Röcklehof, Similshof),
- Rotsal (Sumhof, Feißthansenhof, Simishansenhof, Ober- und Untersteigerhof).
- Hamlets: Am Berg, Auf der Eck, Auf der Grub, Berghansenhof, Häberleshof, Kreuzhof, Liefersberg, Morgend, Moosenmättle, Obertal, Obertal-Grafenloch, Obertal-Rotsal, Schanzhäusle, Schmittegrund, Schmittehof, Stelzersbach, Untertal, Waldhäuser.

== History ==
The name Kirnbach comes from the Middle High German word Kürn (= mill). It was first mentioned in 1275 as Kurnbach or Kurenbach. Kirnbach was part of the territory of the Lords of Hornberg. The village went by marriage to Duke Reinhold of Urslingen and, after his death, to the line of Geroldseck from Sulz. From them Kirnbach and its entire superior district (Oberamt) of Hornberg went to the Kingdom of Württemberg.

In the border treaty between Württemberg and Baden (Gränzvertrag zwischen dem Königreich Würtemberg und dem Großherzogthum Baden), which was signed on 2 October 1810 in Paris, several elements (Stäbe) of Hornberg were given to the Grand Duchy of Baden. They included the municipality of Kirnbach, the towns of Hornberg and Schiltach and the municipality of Gutach.

The village was an independent municipality until 1974 before it was incorporated into the borough of Wolfach.

== Churches ==
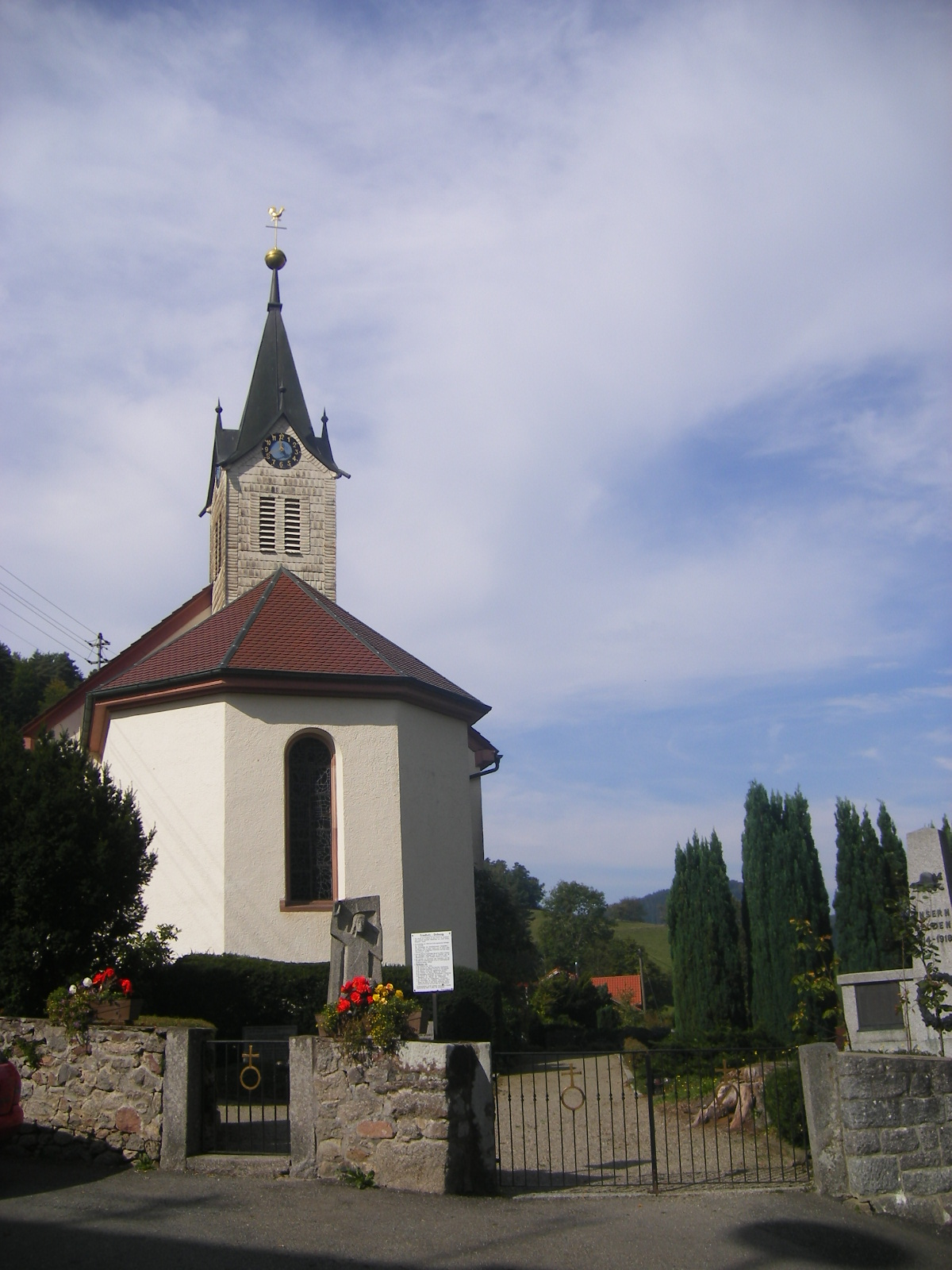
Evangelical village church of Kirnbach

In 1270 the Deanery of Kirnbach was mentioned. The parish church is first recorded in 1370. In 1549 the church which had been consecrated to St. Nicholas and Our Dear Lady, became Evangelical (Protestant). In the same year the first Evangelical priest appeared. Kirnbach has its own Evangelical church, because it belonged to Württemberg before the Grand Duchy of Baden was formed. The present church was built in 1861. The church register has survived completely intact beginning with the year 1704.

== Culture and customs ==
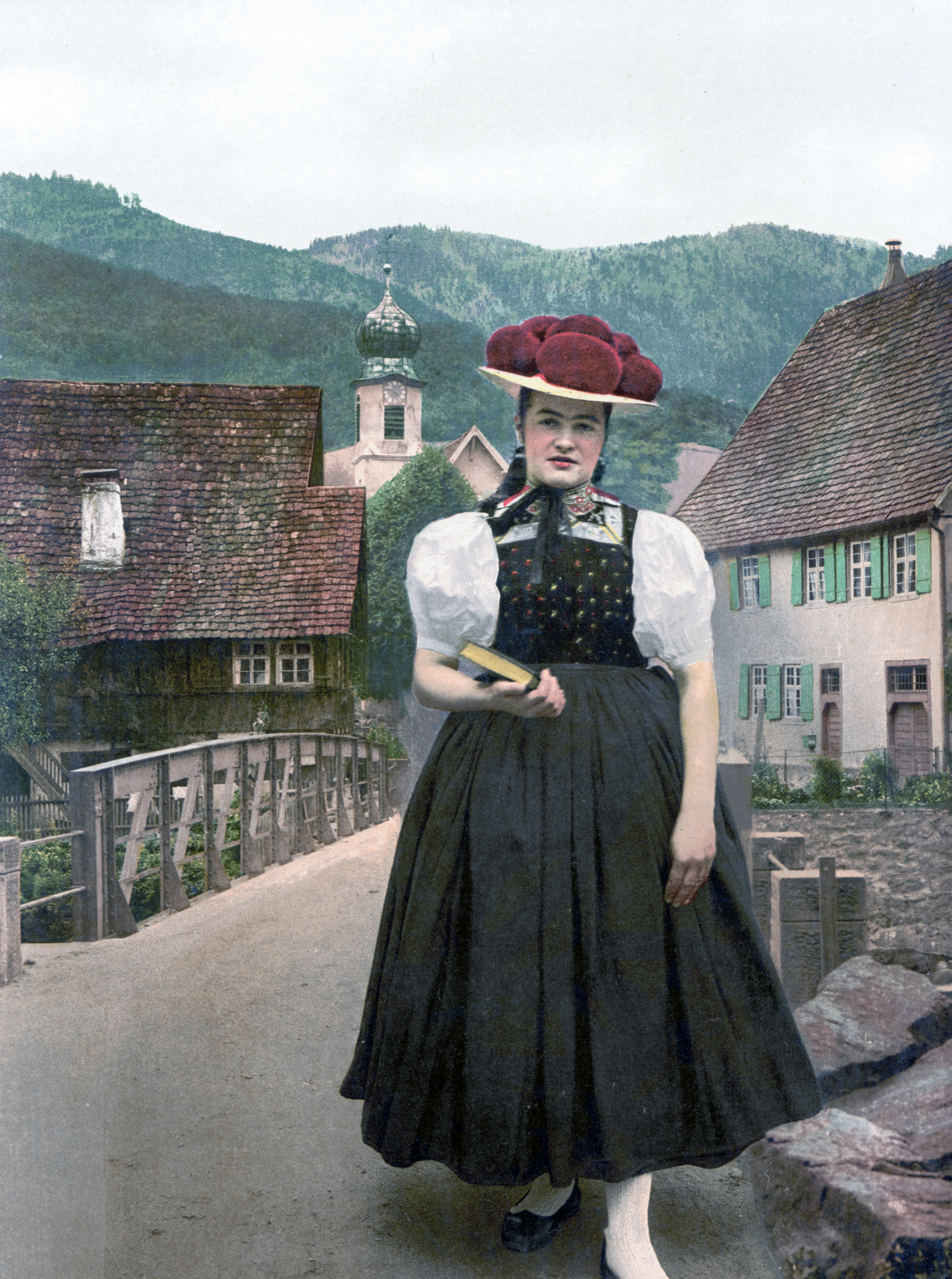
Local costume with bollenhut, as it is worn in Kirnbach, Gutach and Reichenbach

The famous Kirnbach costume with the red, but also black bollenhut, may be seen, for example, in the Black Forest Costume Museum in Haslach im Kinzigtal.

== Clubs and associations ==
- The music society Trachtenkapelle Kirnbach was founded in 1905.
- In 1956 the football club, FC Kirnbach, was founded.
