= Kirnbach =

Kirnbach may refer to:

- Kirnbach (Wolfach), a village in Baden-Württemberg, Germany
- Kirnbach (Kinzig), a river in Baden-Württemberg, Germany, tributary of the Kinzig
- Kirnbach (Schiltach), a river in Baden-Württemberg, Germany, tributary of the Schiltach
