= Liebich =

Liebich is a German surname. Notable people with the surname include:

- Beate Liebich (born 1958), German middle-distance runner
- Curt Liebich (1868–1937), German painter
- Stefan Liebich (born 1972), German politician
