= Bollenhut =

Traditional German headwear

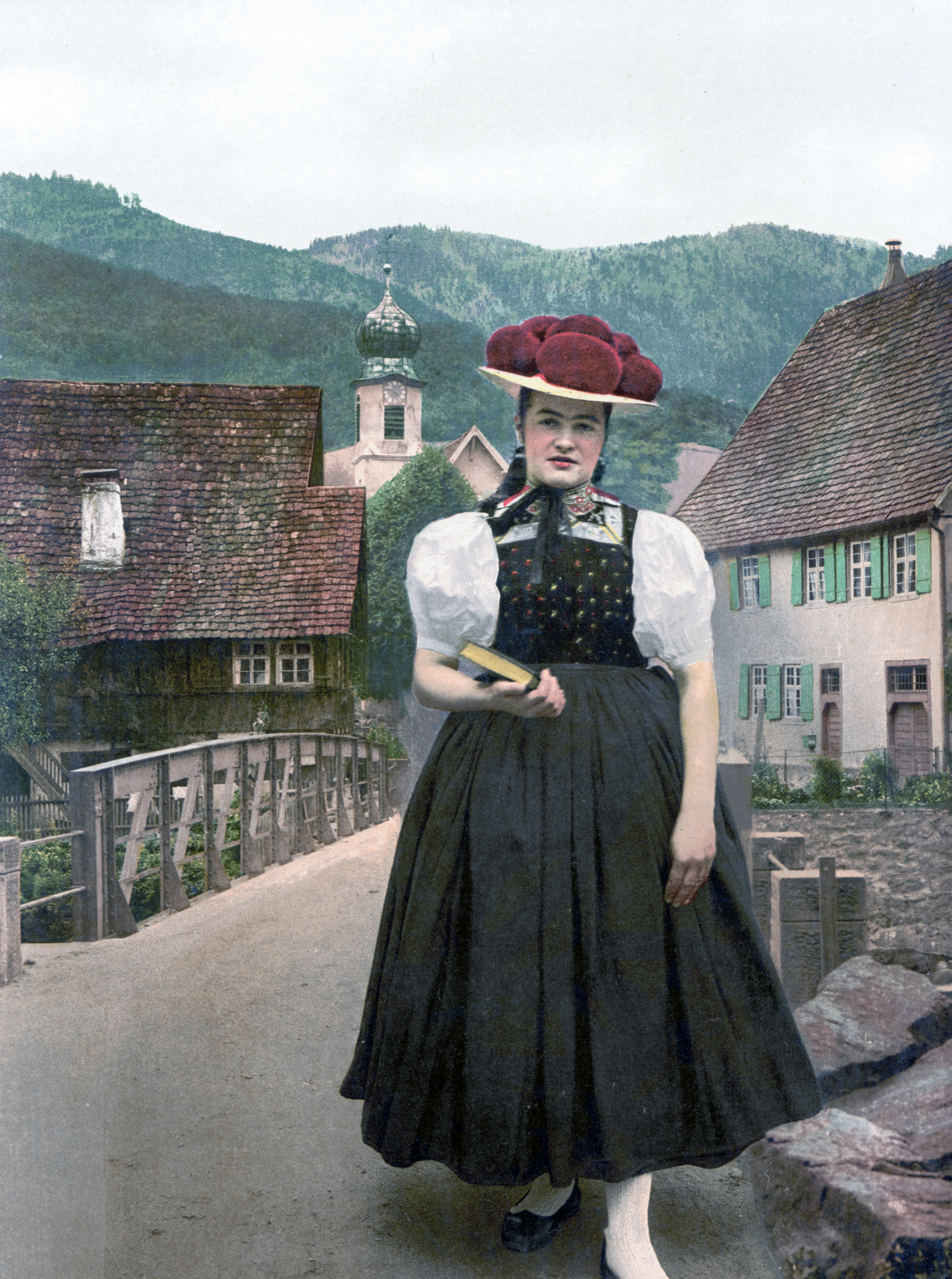
Woman in the Black Forest, around 1900

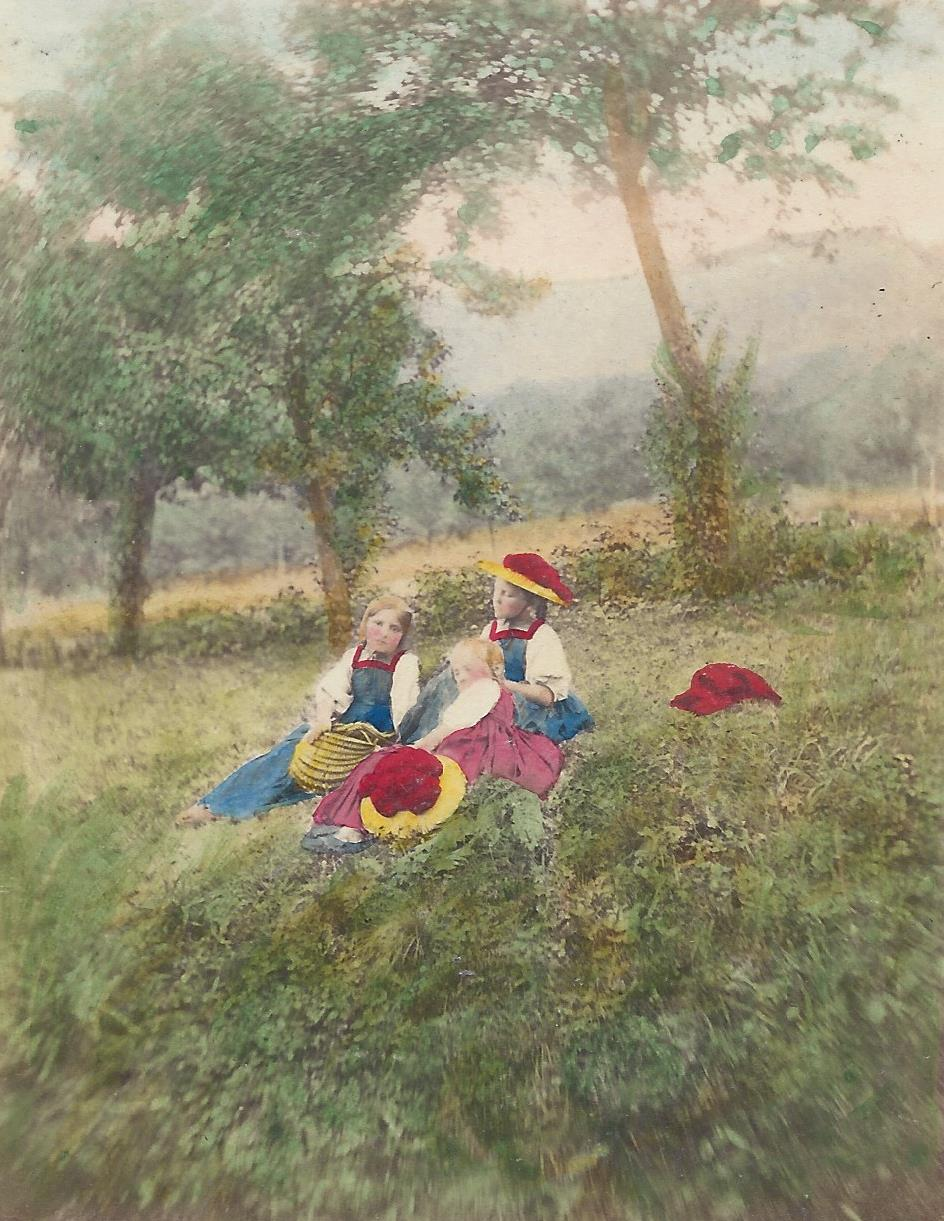
Ludovico Wolfgang Hart, Three Girls of Gutach, 1864

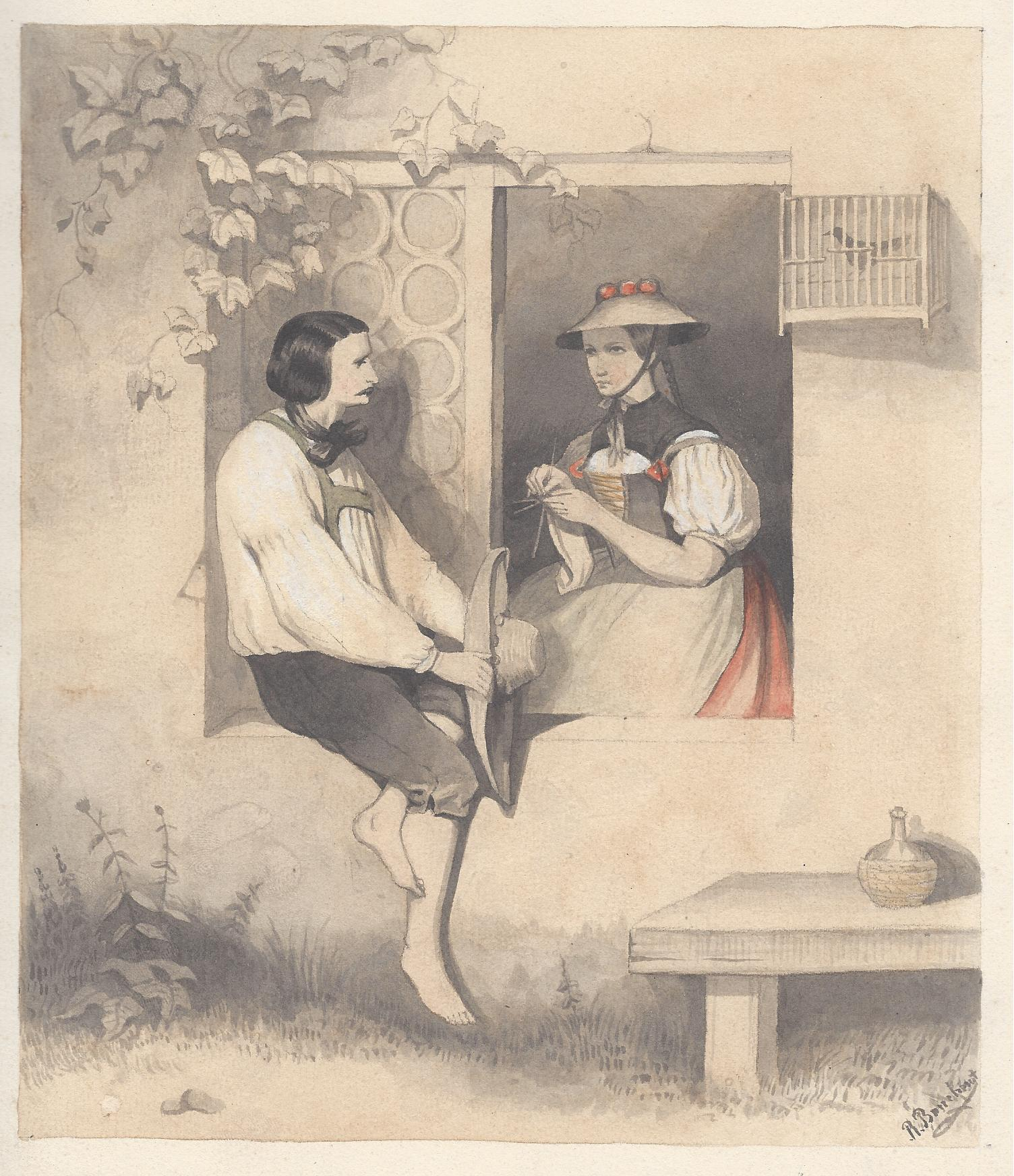
Théodore Valerio, Couple of Hornberg, 1841

A Bollenhut (German: [ˈbɔlənˌhuːt], literally "ball-hat") is a formal headdress with distinctive woollen pompoms worn since c. 1750 by Protestant women as part of their folk costume or Tracht in the three adjoining Black Forest villages of Gutach, Kirnbach and Hornberg-Reichenbach. The picturesque-looking red bollenhut has become a symbol of the Black Forest as a whole, despite its rather local origins. The red pom-poms and white brim of the bollenhut also is said to have inspired the top layer of the Black Forest Cake.

== Bollenhut as part of folk costume ==
The broad-brimmed, whitewashed straw hat bears 14 prominent woolen pompoms arranged in the shape of a cross. Only eleven pompoms are visible, however, because three are covered by those on top. Unmarried women wear red pompoms, married women wear black, old women and widows wear only the mob cap. The original Bollenhut, which weighed about 500 grams, can now weigh up to 2 kilograms (4.4 lb) and is manufactured by female milliners. The red Bollenhut may first be worn by girls at their confirmation. It has five different sizes.

A silk mob cap is worn underneath the Bollenhut, tied under the chin. Young girls before confirmation (Gutach and other parishes in vicinage were part of Württemberg until 1804 and were Protestant, unlike the majority of the Black Forest) and old women wore only the mob cap.

Today the Bollenhut and associated Tracht are still worn on holidays and for traditional events. The Bollenhut and local costumes may be seen all year round e.g. in the Black Forest Costume Museum in Haslach im Kinzigtal.

== Development as a Black Forest symbol ==
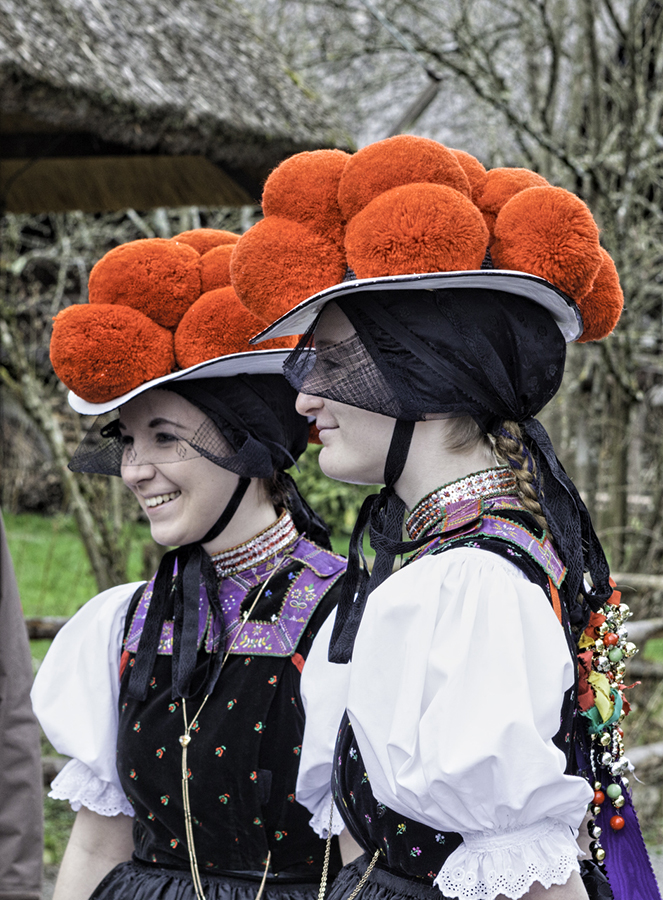
Staff wearing bollenhuts at an outdoor museum in Gutach, Black Forest

In the late 18th century, apart from several mob caps, the Schühut and Gupfhut, which were customary in the County of Hauenstein, were associated with the folk costume of the Black Forest. These types of hats which were known throughout Europe gradually fell out of use by the middle of the 19th century. In 1841 following a study trip through the Black Forest, Théodore Valerio published, through the Frères Gihaut in Paris, a lithograph of a couple from Hornberg wearing their local costume, which showed an early version of the Bollenhut for the first time in France. After Gutach was connected to the Baden Black Forest Railway in 1873, artists like Wilhelm Hasemann, Curt Liebich and Fritz Reiss settled there, forming the "Gutach artists' colony". They portrayed the Gutach costume as an artistic subject, their works were widely distributed and shaped the image of the Black Forest. Like local author, Heinrich Hansjakob, they were part of a movement of Baden folk costume. At the turn of the 20th century, particularly Hasemann's painting, After Going To Church which showed Bollenhut wearers, was widely publicized in illustrated magazines and picture postcards.

The fame of the Bollenhut as (wrongly) generally typical of the Black Forest rose as a result of films of local life (Heimatfilme) in the 1950s and 1960s, particularly the 1950 film, The Black Forest Girl (Schwarzwaldmädel), with Sonja Ziemann. This first German color film of the postwar period is one of the most successful German films of all time with an estimated 15 million viewers.

== See also ==
- Black Forest
- Tracht
