= Tracht =

Traditional garment in German-speaking countries

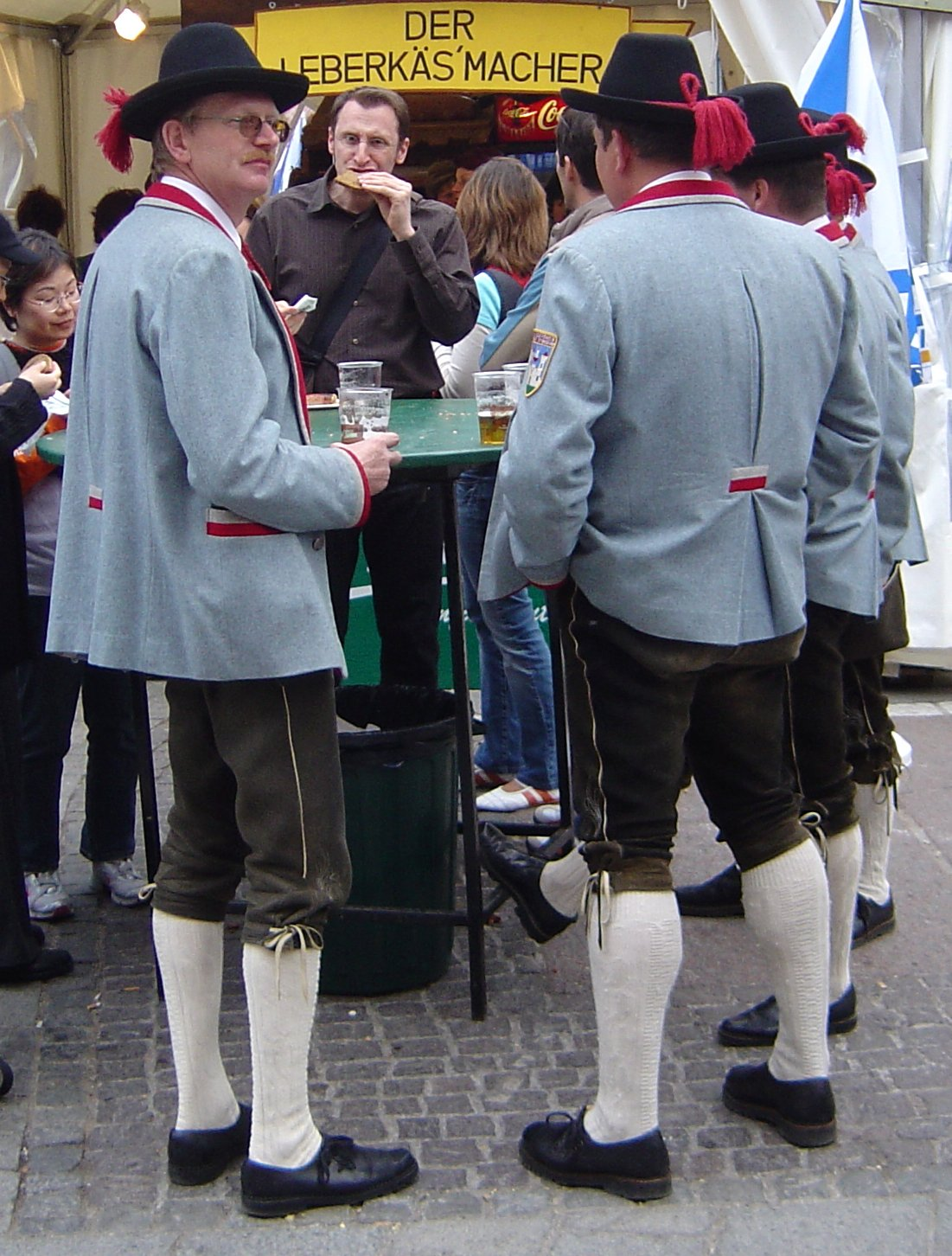
Austrian men in their Tracht

Tracht (German pronunciation: [ˈtʁaxt]) refers to traditional garments in German-speaking countries and regions. Although the word is most often associated with Bavarian, Austrian, South Tyrolean and Trentino garments, including lederhosen and dirndls, many other German-speaking peoples have them, as did the former Danube Swabian populations of Central Europe.

== Name ==
The word "Tracht" comes from the verb "tragen" (to carry or wear); thus the derived noun "Tracht" means "what is worn". So "Tracht" can refer to the clothes which are worn. The noun also has other uses deriving from the verbal meaning, e.g. a load, a device for carrying a load on the shoulders, or the load of honey carried in by the bees). It also appears within the German idiom "eine Tracht Prügel" (a load (of) beating or, alternately, "a good beating").

"Tracht" is commonly used to refer to the manner of dress associated with a particular ethnic group (Volkstracht), social class, or occupation (Arbeitstracht). Most often it refers to clothing, although it can also describe a way of cutting one's hair (Haartracht) or beard (Barttracht).

== Descriptions of different tracht customs ==
In northern Germany some of the best known examples are the "Friesische Tracht" and the Finkenwerder Tracht. The "Friesische Tracht" is richly decorated with beads and embroidery. The quality of the work was a sign of the riches and social status of the wives wearing it. In former times it was brought into a marriage by the bride as part of her dowry. This costume is occasionally still worn at weddings. The "Finkenwerder Tracht" is the traditional garment of the inhabitants of an island in the Elbe river. It is worn by a local folklore group called Finkwarder Speeldeel.

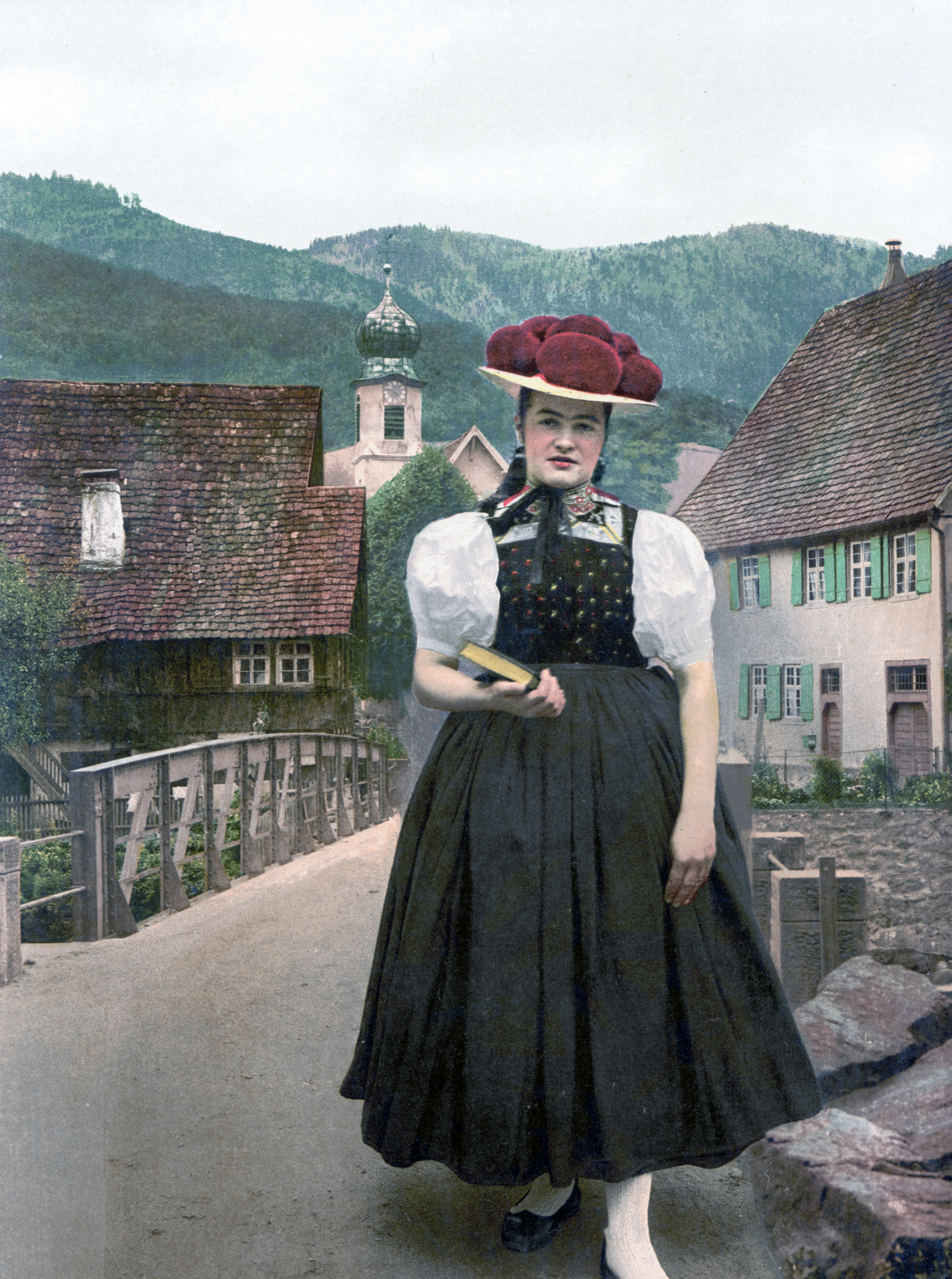
Tracht of Gutach in the Black Forest, around 1900. The red colour of the pompons indicates that the woman is unmarried.

In the region of Baden in south-western Germany, the areas with strong tracht traditions are found predominantly in the Black Forest (Schwarzwald) and the surrounding region. The Bollenhut, a wide-brimmed hat with red pompoms, has become a symbol of the entire Black Forest, although it is traditionally worn only by unmarried women from the three villages of Kirnbach, Gutach and Reichenbach in the Gutach valley. The Schwarzwälder Trachtenmuseum in Haslach (in the Kinzig valley) displays more than 100 life-size figures in tracht costume, giving an overview of the variety of traditional tracht costumes in the Black Forest. Other displays of tracht from the region are found in the Trachtenmuseum Seebach, as well as many Heimat museums in the region. Local tracht associations in the area encourage the wearing of traditional costume, often with a view to promoting tourism; sometimes these tracht costumes have been recently created.

In Bavaria, the best-known folk costume is undoubtedly the Alpine tracht of Upper Bavaria, consisting of lederhosen for the Buam (man) and the dirndl for the Madl (woman). Today six traditional subtypes of the Alpine tracht are recognised in Bavaria: Miesbacher Tracht, Werdenfelser Tracht, Inntaler Tracht, Chiemgauer Tracht, Berchtesgadener Tracht and Isarwinkler Tracht. The Alpine tracht has also been adopted as traditional dress in regions beyond the Alps, through promotion by tracht associations and migration in search of work; consequently, it is now understood as "the" German folk costume. However, there are still a great many other traditional tracht designs in Bavaria, mostly worn only regionally. These include the Dachauer Tracht, the Priener hat or the more recently arisen Herrschinger Hosenträger (braces / suspenders).

Displaced German peoples like the Sudetendeutsche often used events where they wore Tracht to emphasize their unity.

Costumes worn by professional guilds, habits of religious orders, deaconesses, and the historical garment of some occupational groups (e.g. nurses) are also called "Tracht". While some of them have fallen into disuse, carpenter journeymen can still be seen wearing their traditional garment while traveling throughout Europe.

== History ==
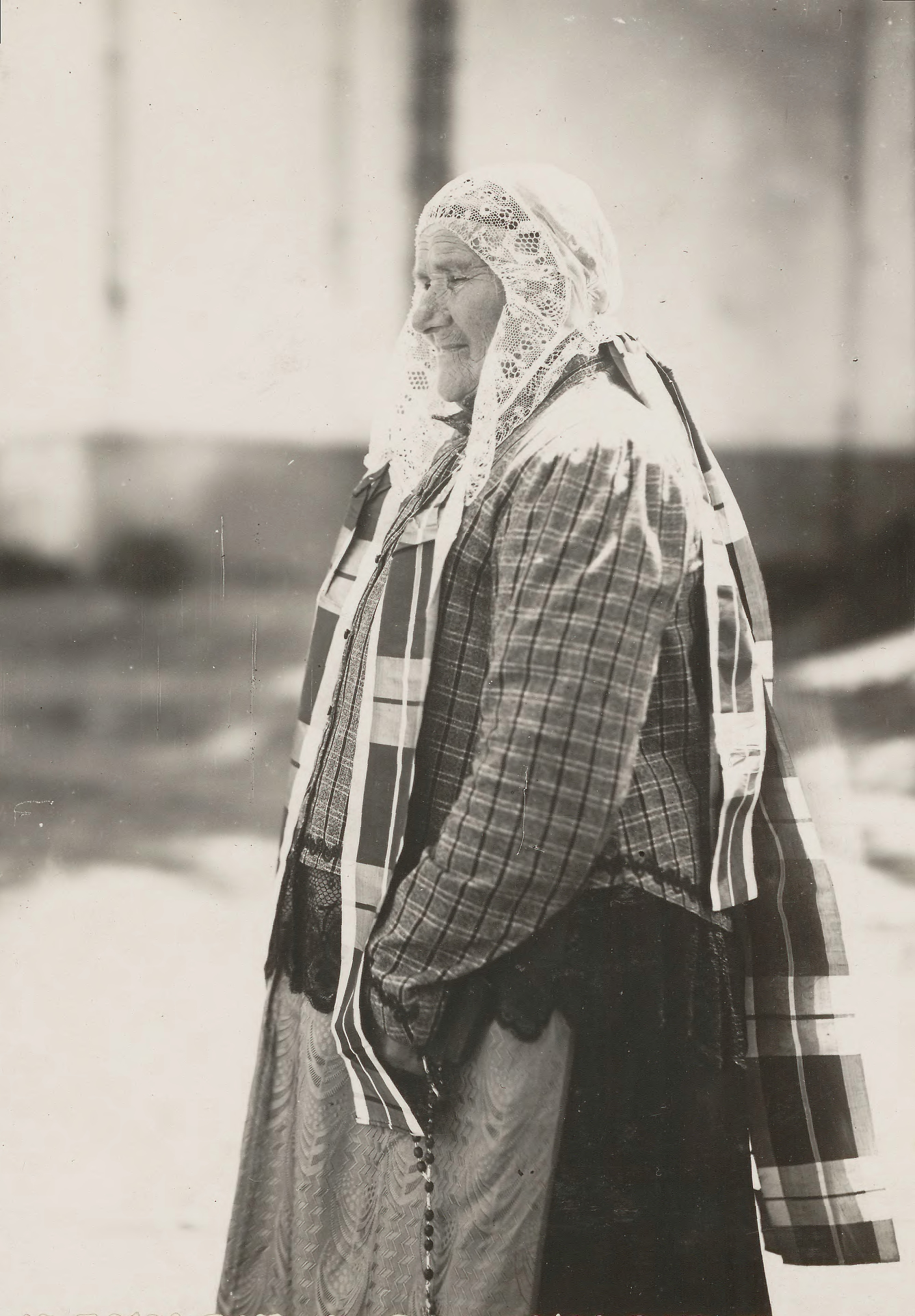
Woman wearing an Upper Silesian Tracht, Prudnik

Folk costumes originated in rural areas. They showed that the wearer belonged to a particular social class, occupation, religious persuasion or ethnic group. In the country, the folk costumes developed differently from one another. They were influenced by urban fashions, costumes in neighbouring regions, available materials, as well as fashions in the royal courts and in the military. The earliest known folk costumes developed at the end of the 15th century. Although folk costumes varied in practice between everyday and festive versions, the festive version of each costume tradition was considered the ideal form.

The history of tracht in the 19th century is inseparable from the history of the movement in German-speaking countries to promote folk costume (Trachtenbewegung). The idea of an approved folk costume dates back to the 18th century, and was promoted by the Swedish king Gustav III. At the beginning of the 19th century, enthusiasm for the different costumes of the rural population developed at the royal courts of Bavaria and Austria. The interest in traditional costume was part of a wider cultural response to the humiliations suffered through the repeated foreign invasions during the Napoleonic Wars. The German-speaking peoples investigated their cultural heritage as a reaffirmation of their identity. The result was a flowering of research and artistic work centred around Germanic cultural traditions, expressed in painting, literature, architecture, music and promotion of German language and folklore.

The first extensive description of traditional tracht in the different regions was given by the Bavarian official Joseph von Hazzi (1768–1845). A comprehensive description of Bavarian national costumes was published in 1830 by the archivist Felix Joseph von Lipowsky. A parade of traditional costumes took place in 1835 at Oktoberfest, to celebrate the silver wedding anniversary of King Ludwig I of Bavaria and Queen Therese. Under his successor Maximilian II, traditional costumes were officially recognised as clothing suitable for wearing at the royal court. The king himself included officials wearing tracht in his court ceremonies and wrote in 1849 that he considered the wearing of traditional dress of "great importance" for national sentiment.

In 1859, the first association to promote traditional costume was founded in Miesbach in Bavaria. In the following years, similar tracht associations (Trachtenvereine) were founded throughout Germany and Austria. The first umbrella organisation for the tracht associations was founded in 1890. In 1895, the Bavarian novelist Maximilian Schmidt organized a parade of traditional costume at Oktoberfest, with 1,400 participants in 150 traditional costume groups.

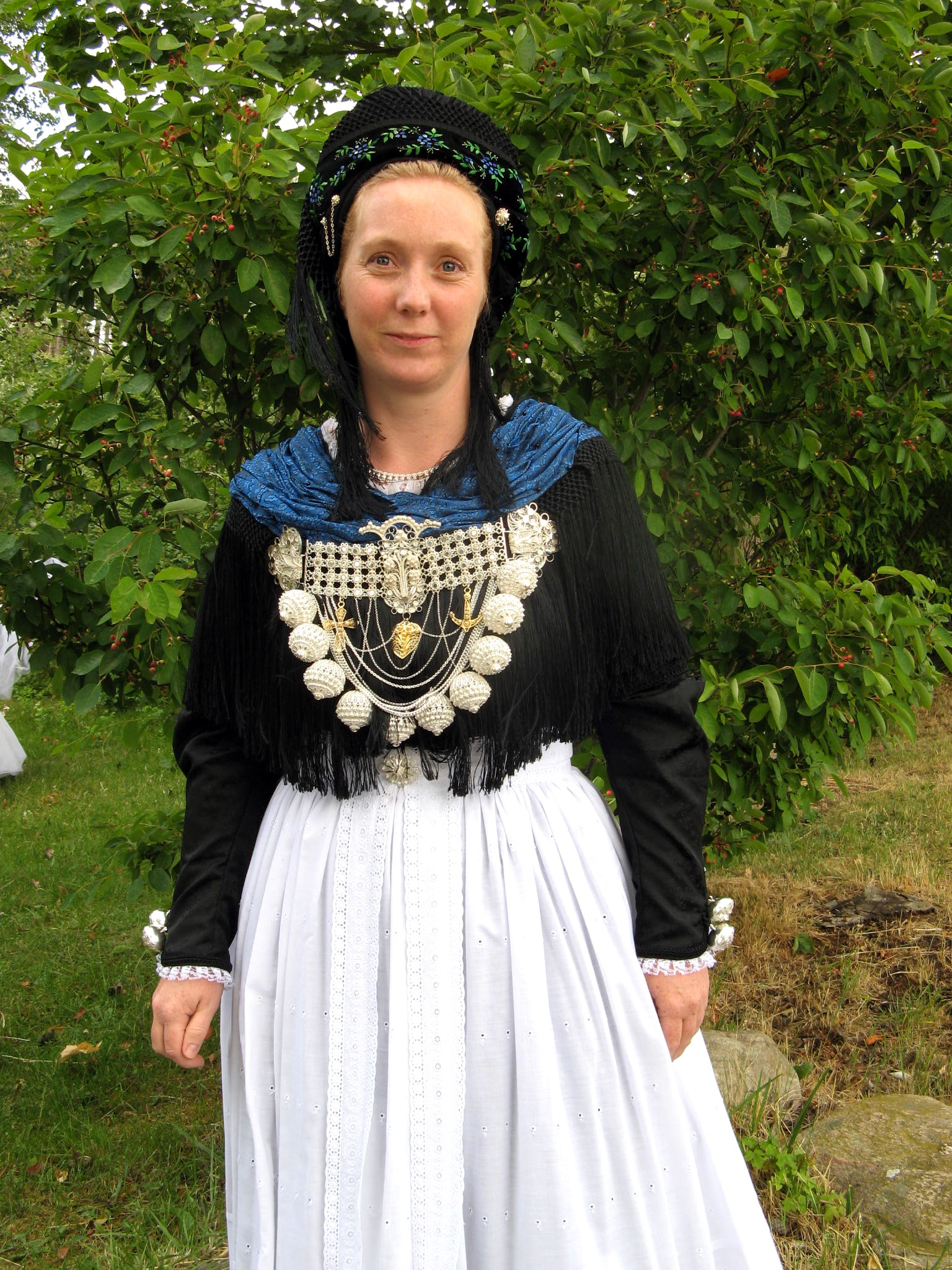
Frisian Tracht from the North Sea isle of Föhr

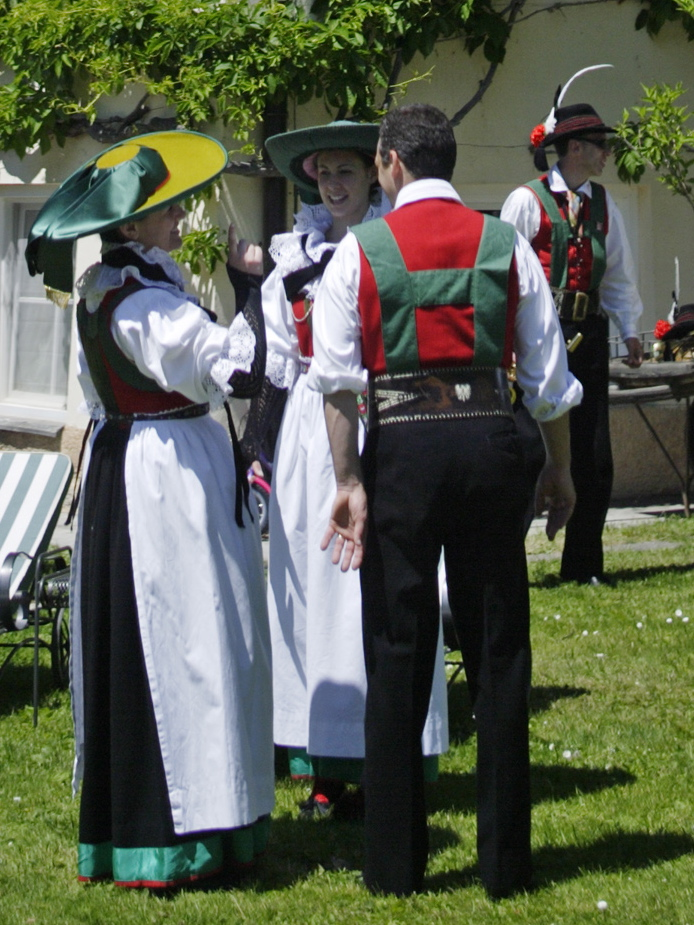
Tracht from South Tyrol

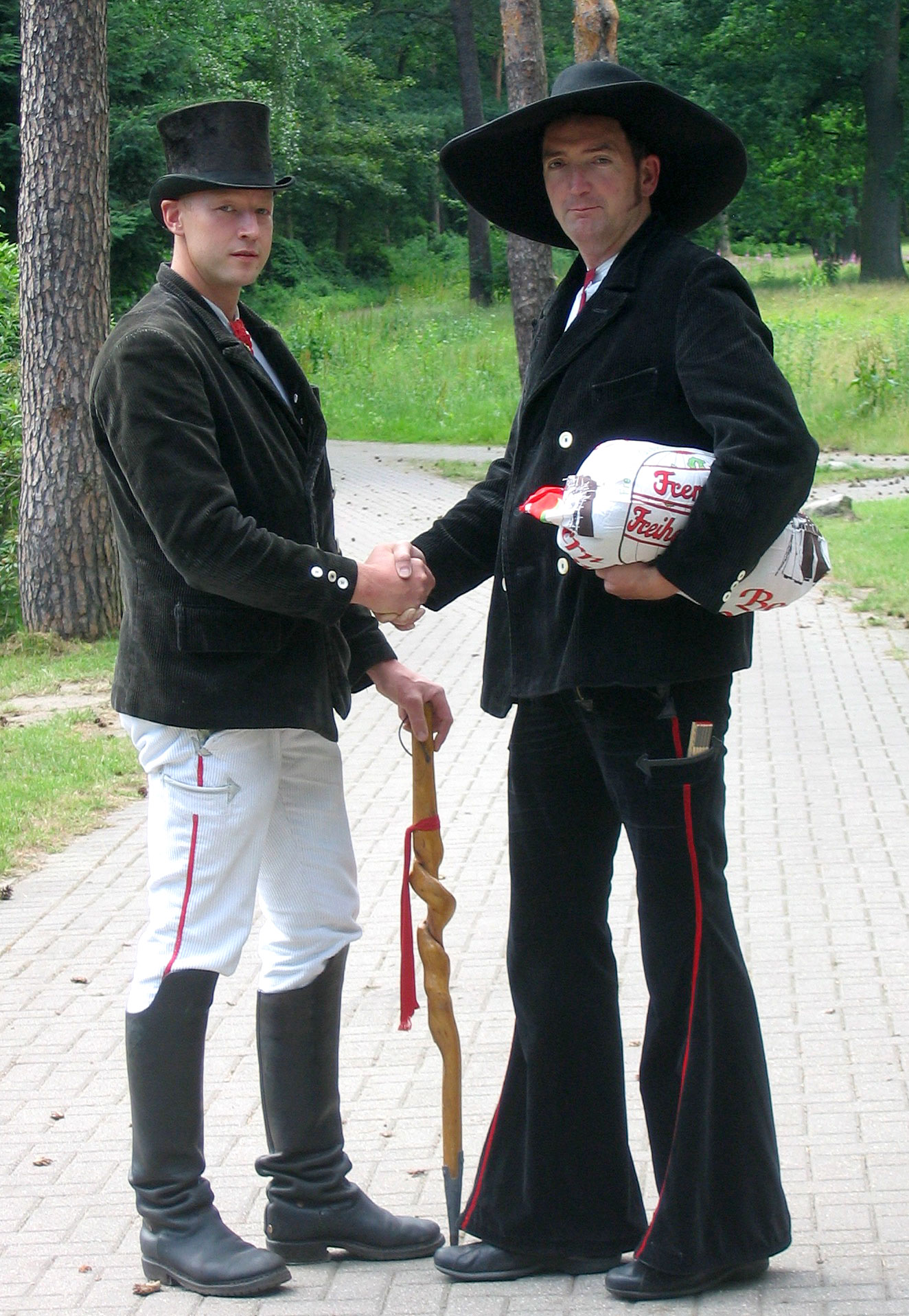
Carpenter in Zimmermannstracht on the right

Danube Swabian women's tracht from Romanian Banat

== See also ==
- Austrian folk dancing
- British country clothing
- Bollenhut
- Dirndl
- Haferlschuh
- Lederhosen
- National costume

== External resources ==
- List of Austrian trachts, in German
