= Kirnbach (Kinzig) =

River in Germany

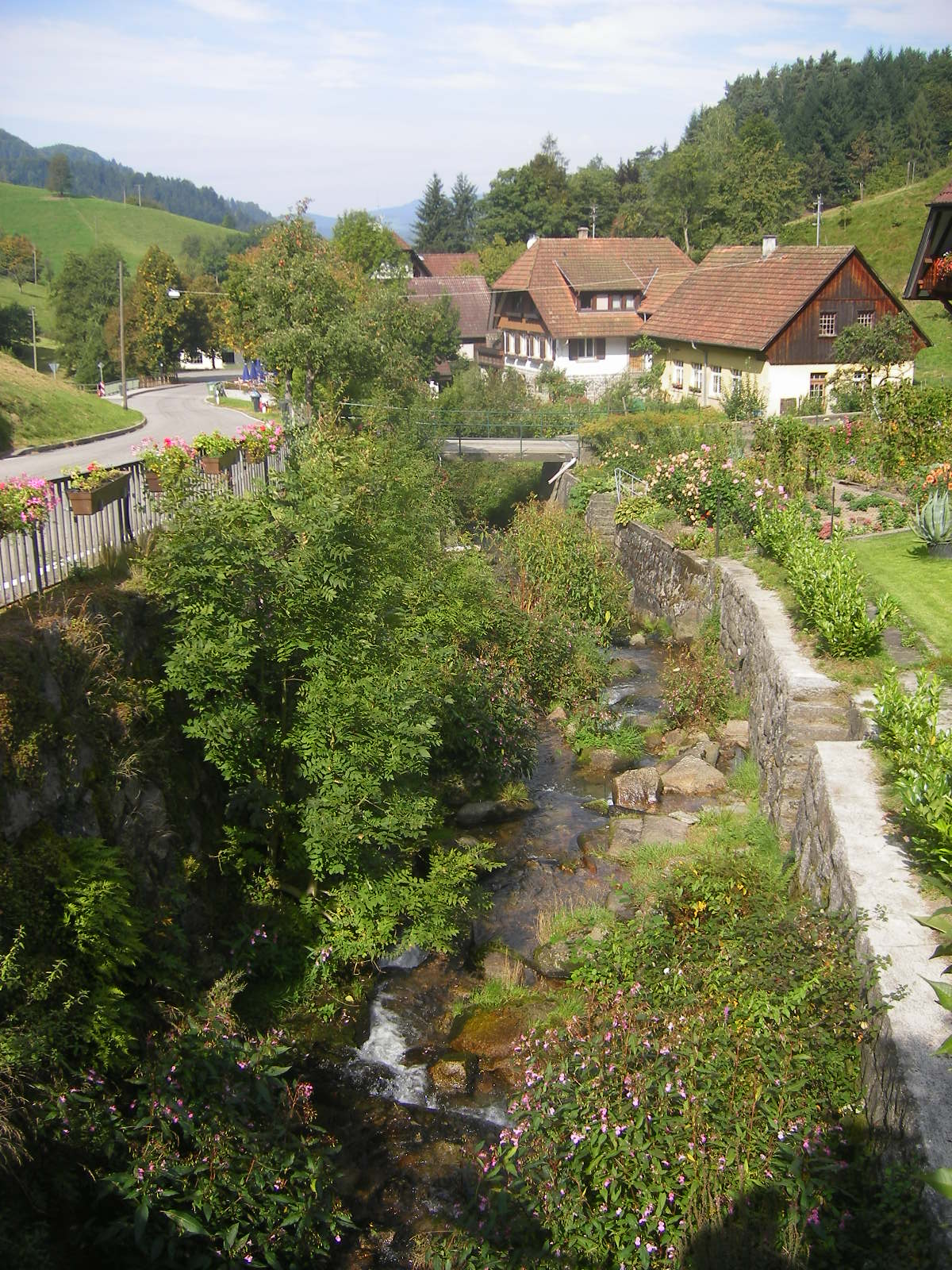

Location
- Country: Germany
- States: Baden-Württemberg

Physical characteristics
- Mouth
  - location: Kinzig
  - coordinates: 48.2798°N 8.2128°E

Basin features
- Progression: Kinzig→ Rhine→ North Sea

The Kirnbach is an approximately 8 km long river running through the Black Forest in the Baden-Württemberg district. It flows into the Kinzig, then to the southeast between Wolfach and Hausach.

== Course ==
The Kirnbach is a stream located in the Black Forest, flowing through the Kirnbach district of Wolfach, one of the three "Bollenhut villages." It originates as the Rotsalbach at the edge of the municipality, near the Moosenmättle in Schiltach. After winding westward for about four kilometers, it merges with the shorter, but hydrologically significant Grafenlochbächle to form the Kirnbach. From this confluence, the Kirnbach generally flows northwest, largely following the direction of the Grafenlochbächle, until its mouth. The total length of the Kirnbach, from the source of the Rotsalbach at the Moosenmättle to its mouth, is 8.1 kilometers.

The Kirnbach's catchment area spans 17.1 square kilometers. To the north-northeast, it borders the catchment area of the upstream Kinzig River. To the east-southeast, via the Rotsalbach, it adjoins the basin of the Sulzbach, which flows to the Schiltach in Schramberg; thus, its waters also reach the upstream Kinzig via the Lauterbach and Schiltach rivers. In the southeast and south, streams primarily feeding the left-bank Kirnbach headwater, the Grafenlochbächle, compete with other streams on the opposite side that flow towards the Gutach's headwater, the Reichenbach. Beyond the southwestern watershed, the Gutach itself runs almost parallel to the downstream Kinzig.

The highest elevation within the catchment area is the 871.9-meter-high Moosenkapf, situated above the spring at the Moosenmättle. This peak is part of a recessed semicircle of mountains, within which the slightly higher Mooswaldkopf lies just outside the Kirnbach's direct catchment.

The Kirnbach flows through the eponymous scattered settlement, which now extends throughout the entire valley. Its course takes it past old farmhouses and the church in the upper valley. The stream ultimately empties into the Kinzig River between the towns of Wolfach and Hausach. Its incised valley, which only widens somewhat in its lower reaches, can be explored along the small but wild river via the Bollenhutwegle, a designated footpath.

== See also ==
- List of rivers of Baden-Württemberg
