= Duravit =

German bathroom fittings company

Duravit AG
- Type: Incorporation
- Industry: Sanitary ceramics, bathroom furniture, shower trays and bathtubs, whirl and wellness systems, shower toilets and accessories
- Founded: 1817; 209 years ago
- Headquarters: Hornberg, Germany
- Key people: Michael Demmer(CEO); Thomas Stammel; Martin Winkle
- Revenue: €604 million (group, 2021)
- Number of employees: 7,000 (2022)
- Website: www.duravit.com

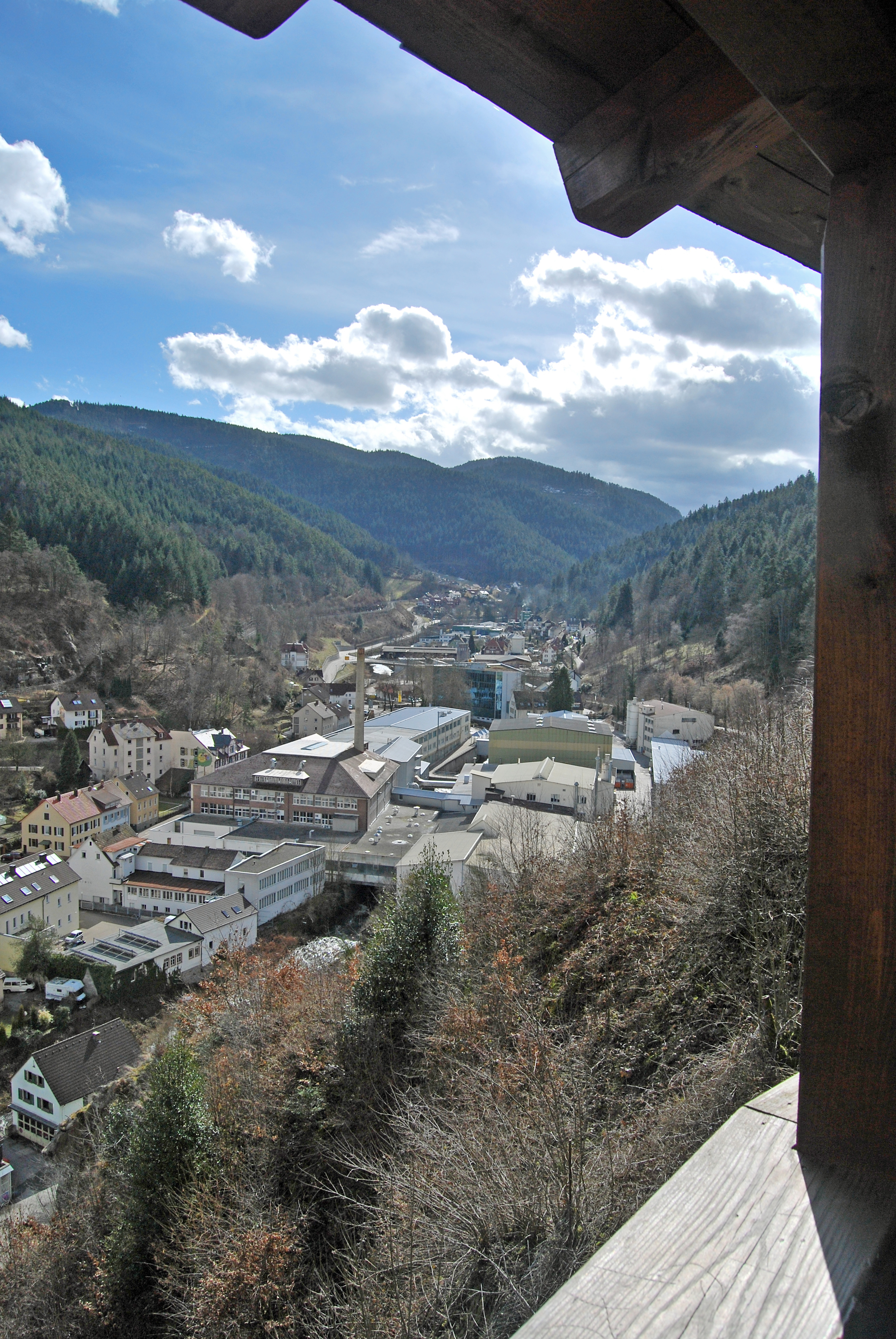
Duravit plant in Hornberg

Duravit AG, founded in 1817 and headquartered in Hornberg, Germany, is primarily a manufacturer of porcelain bathroom fittings. In recent years, the company has diversified its scope to include other products.

== History ==
Founded as a small earthenware factory by Georg Friedrich Horn in 1817 in the Black Forest, Duravit did not begin to produce sanitary fixtures until the early 20th century such as sinks, bidets, and toilets. In the 1980s, the product line was expanded to offer bathroom accessories. The 1980s and 1990s were also characterized by various corporate acquisitions, including "Ceramique de Bischwiller in 1991, "MISR TECH" in 1999, and a partial stake in Laufen. This period also saw the further growth of product lines, including the introduction of bathroom furniture. In 1994, Duravit opened a new, modern plant for the production of sanitary ceramics.

Duravit's expansion continued in the first decade of the 21st Century with the establishment of subsidiaries in Turkey, India and China. The Duravit Design Center in Hornberg, designed by Philippe Starck, was also completed during this time. The brand is currently available in over 130 countries.

With a joint venture agreement, the company began expanding its activities in China in 2003 and has been trading there since then as Duravit Chongqing Sanitaryware Co. Ltd. Two years later, the newly built production and administration building in Youxi Town (Jiangjin) near Chongqing was officially inaugurated. Today, the former joint venture company is a 100 percent subsidiary and trades as Duravit Sanitaryware Co. Ltd. In 2008, Duravit took over 51% of the Tunisian ceramics manufacturer Manufacture Tunisienne des Céramiques (MTC). In 2010, Duravit opened a new production site in Tarapur, India. The starting signal for Duravit Sanitaryware Technology Co. Ltd, a new engineering and assembly plant in Shanghai, fell in 2011.

== Factory sites ==
There are production facilities at several locations in Germany and abroad: Hornberg, Schenkenzell and Meißen in Germany, and in Bischwiller (France), Cairo (Egypt), Chongqing (China), Bizerte (Tunisia) and Tarapur (India).
