= Haferlschuh =

Traditional Bavarian footwear

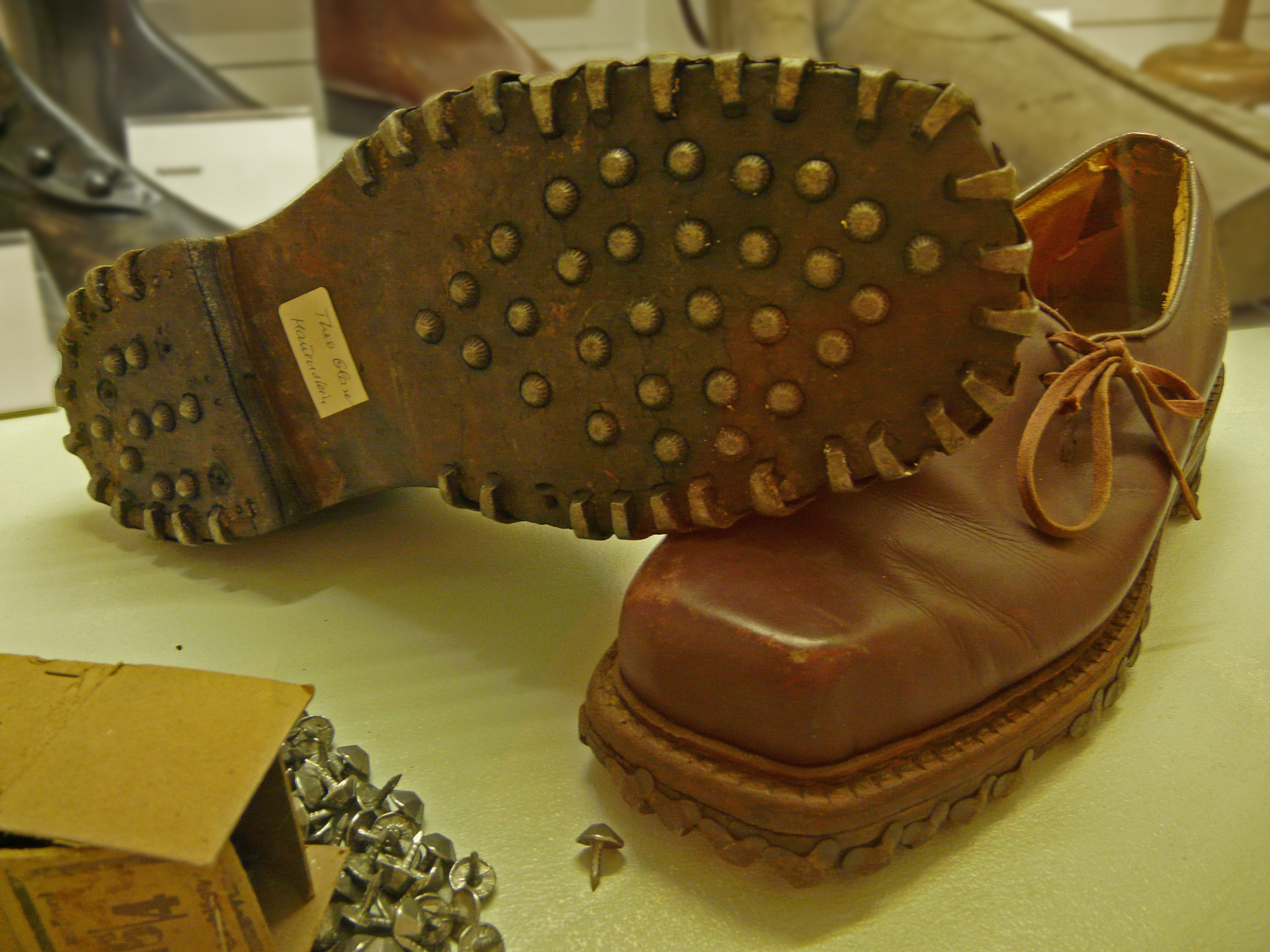
Haferlschuh

The Haferlschuh (German: [ˈhaːfɐlˌʃuː]) is the traditional Bavarian shoe. It was designed originally as a work shoe for alpine terrain, but it can now be worn in a more general setting. In Bavaria it may also be called a Bundschuh. In Austria, it is known as a Schützenschuh.

According to legend, in 1803 Franz Schratt, an alpine shoemaker from Oberstdorf (located in the Allgäu region of the Bavarian Alps), developed the Haferlschuh inspired by the goat hoof. However, author and shoe expert Helge Sternke asserts that the Haferlschuh is much older. With a boatlike front and hobnailed sole, the shoes gave the wearer stability.

Since 1900, the Haferlschuh has become a part of many alpine Trachten. Nonetheless, the Haferlschuh is still worn as an everyday shoe, and not just for special occasions like Oktoberfest.

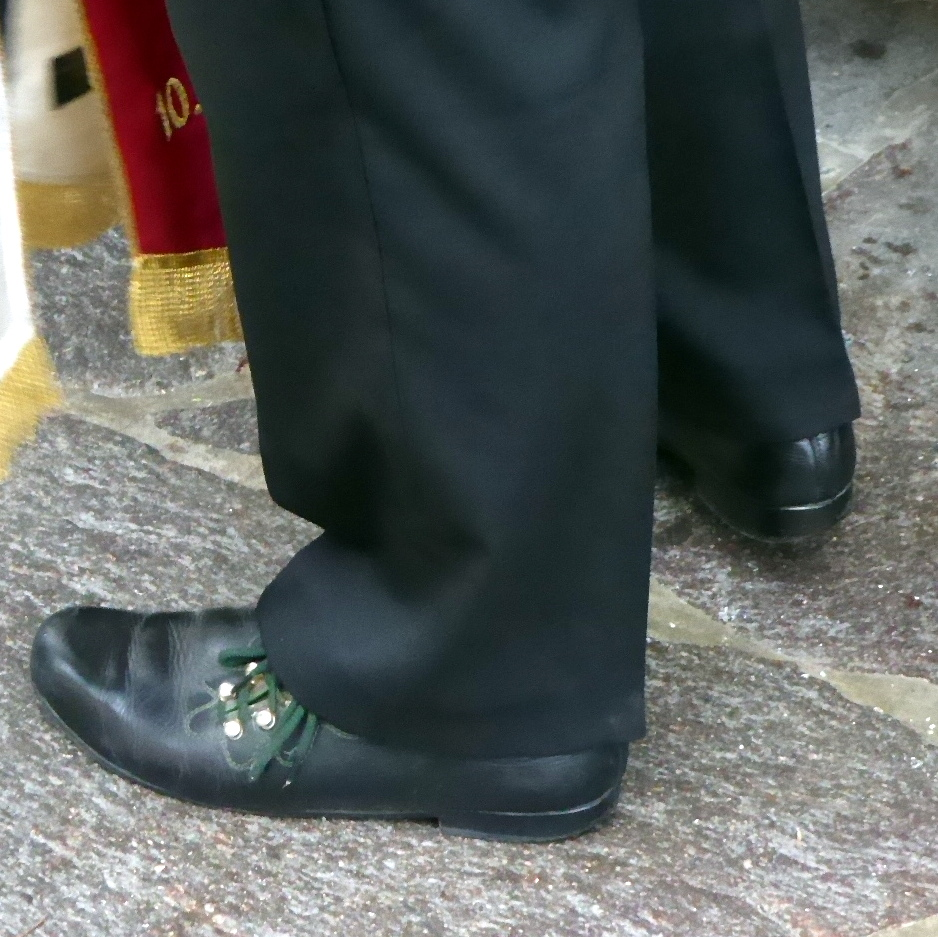
Black haferlschuhe

== See also ==
- List of shoe styles
