= Black Forest Costume Museum =

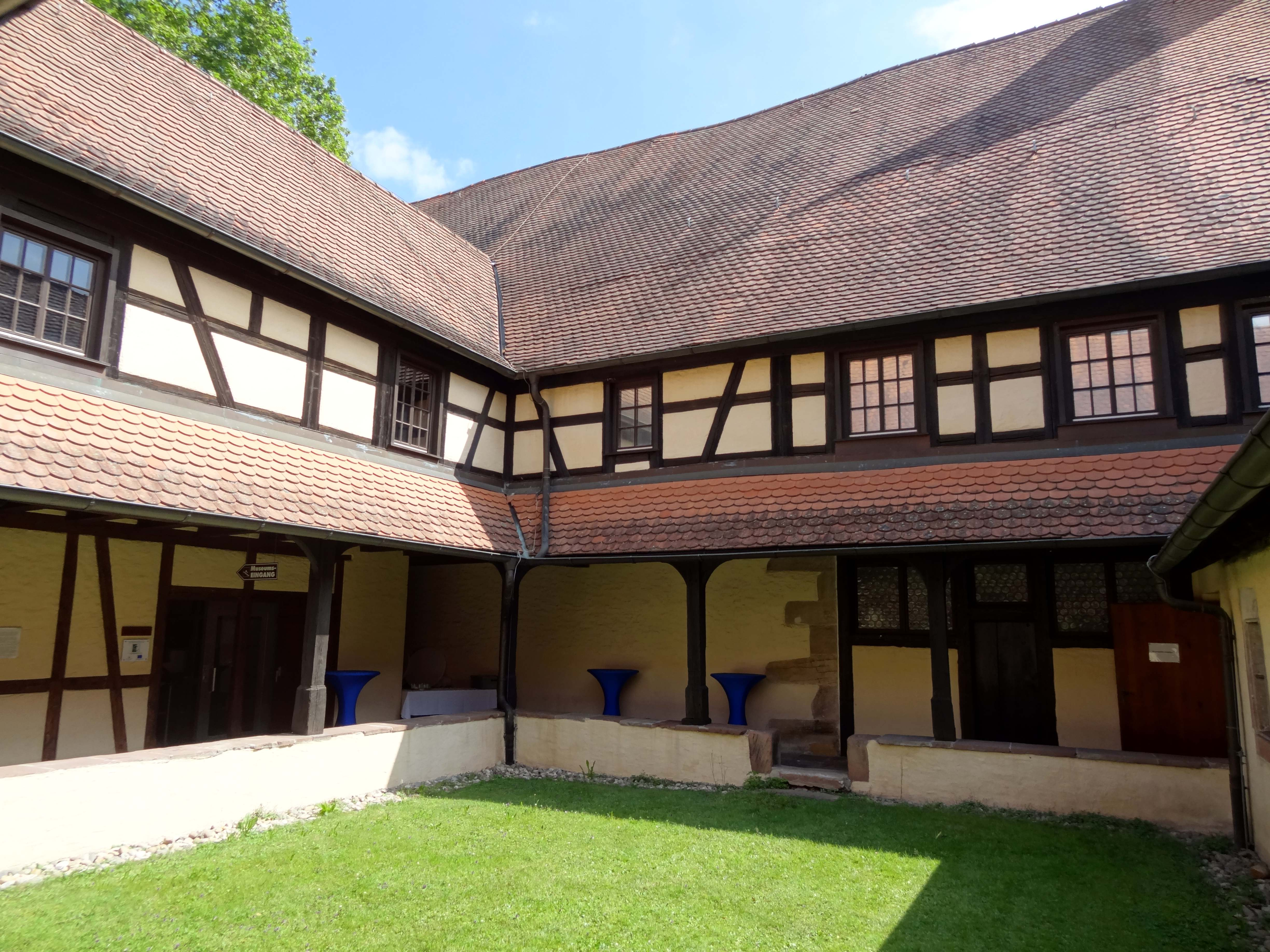
- The Black Forest Costume Museum inside of the former Capuchin abbey
- Established: 1980
- Location: Haslach im Kinzigtal, Black Forest, Germany
- Type: Folk museum, Local museum
- Website: https://www.schwarzwald-tourismus.info/attraktionen/schwarzwaelder-trachtenmuseum-haslach-494b1a2f4d

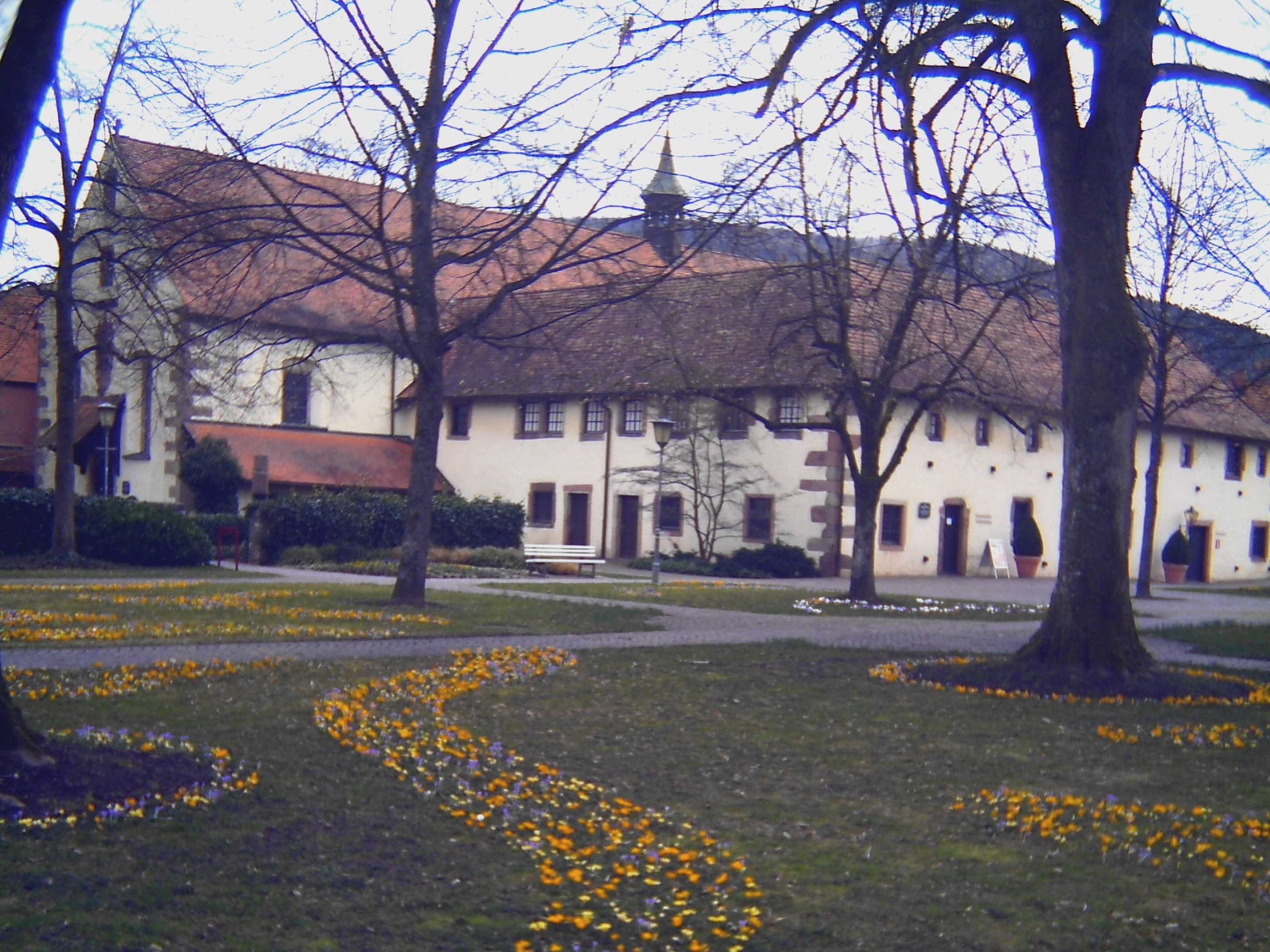
Capuchin Abbey, Haslach, the site of the museum

The Black Forest Costume Museum (German: Schwarzwälder Trachtenmuseum) is a museum in the convent building of the former Capuchin abbey in Haslach im Kinzigtal in the Baden-Württemberg county of Ortenaukreis in south Germany.

The museum was opened in 1980 in the renovated buildings of the abbey. It portrays the history and development of traditional folk costume in the Black Forest and its surrounding regions.

== Exhibits ==
The museum houses some of the most important original costumes from the following regions:

- Central Black Forest
- Southern Black Forest
- Northern Black Forest (Foothills on the Upper Rhine Plain)
- Black Forest perimeter
- Ried
- Breisgau
- Markgräflerland

Over 100 life-size figures are displayed.

Influenced by the respective zeitgeist and fashion trends, by prosperity, poverty and denominational ties, the individual costumes of the Black Forest in the 18th century all have their own twist.

=== Themes ===
- Bonnets and hats, e. g. the Bollenhut
- Bridal crowns (Schäppel )
- Civic dress
- Work clothing

== The Old Capuchin abbey ==
The old Capuchin monastery (built 1630–32), which houses this collection of costumes, is the only completely preserved baroque monastery of the Capuchin order in all of southern Germany.

== Coordinates ==
48°16′33.91″N 8°5′6.90″E

== Photo gallery ==
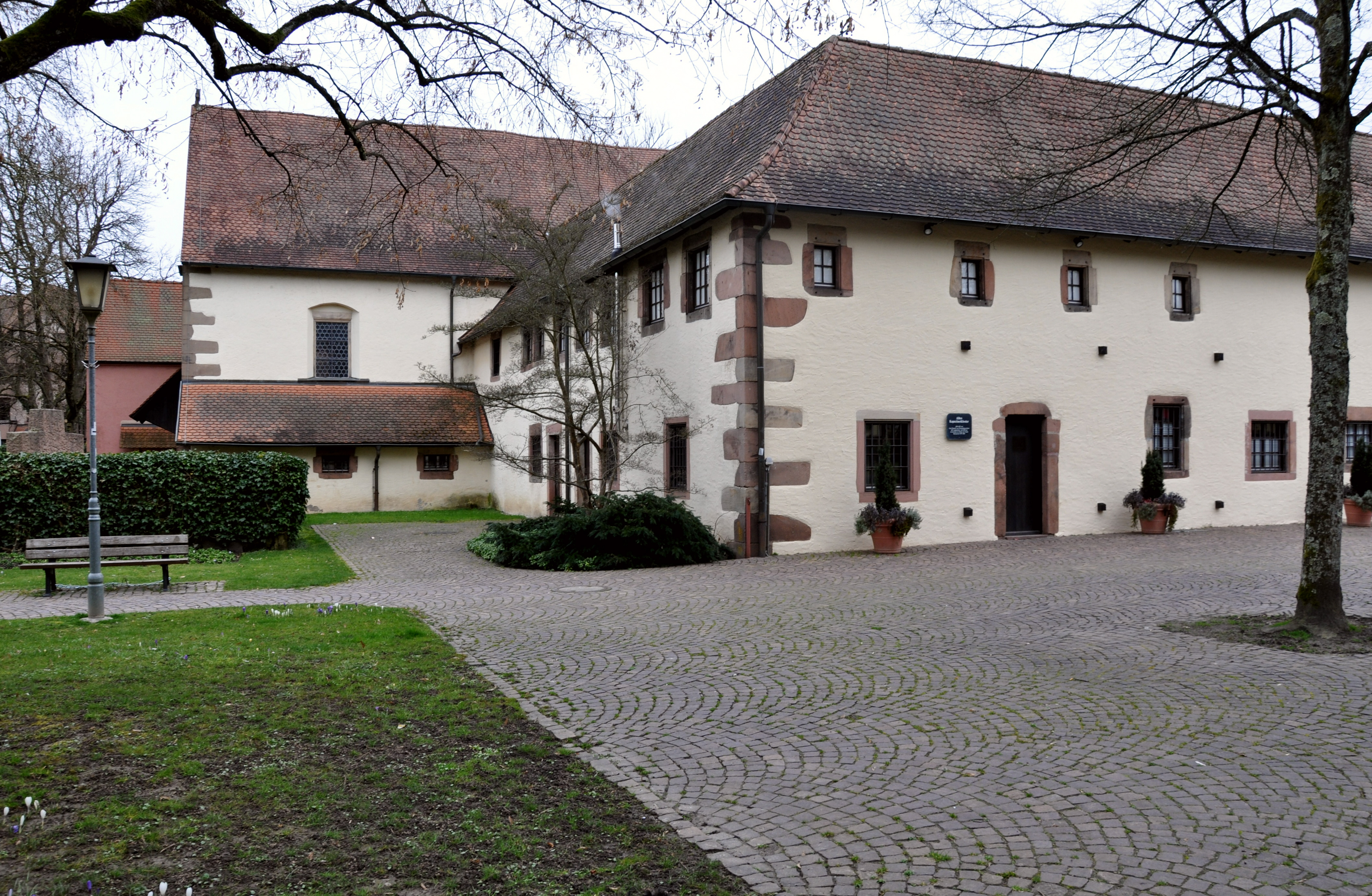
The Old Capuchin abbey from the outside I

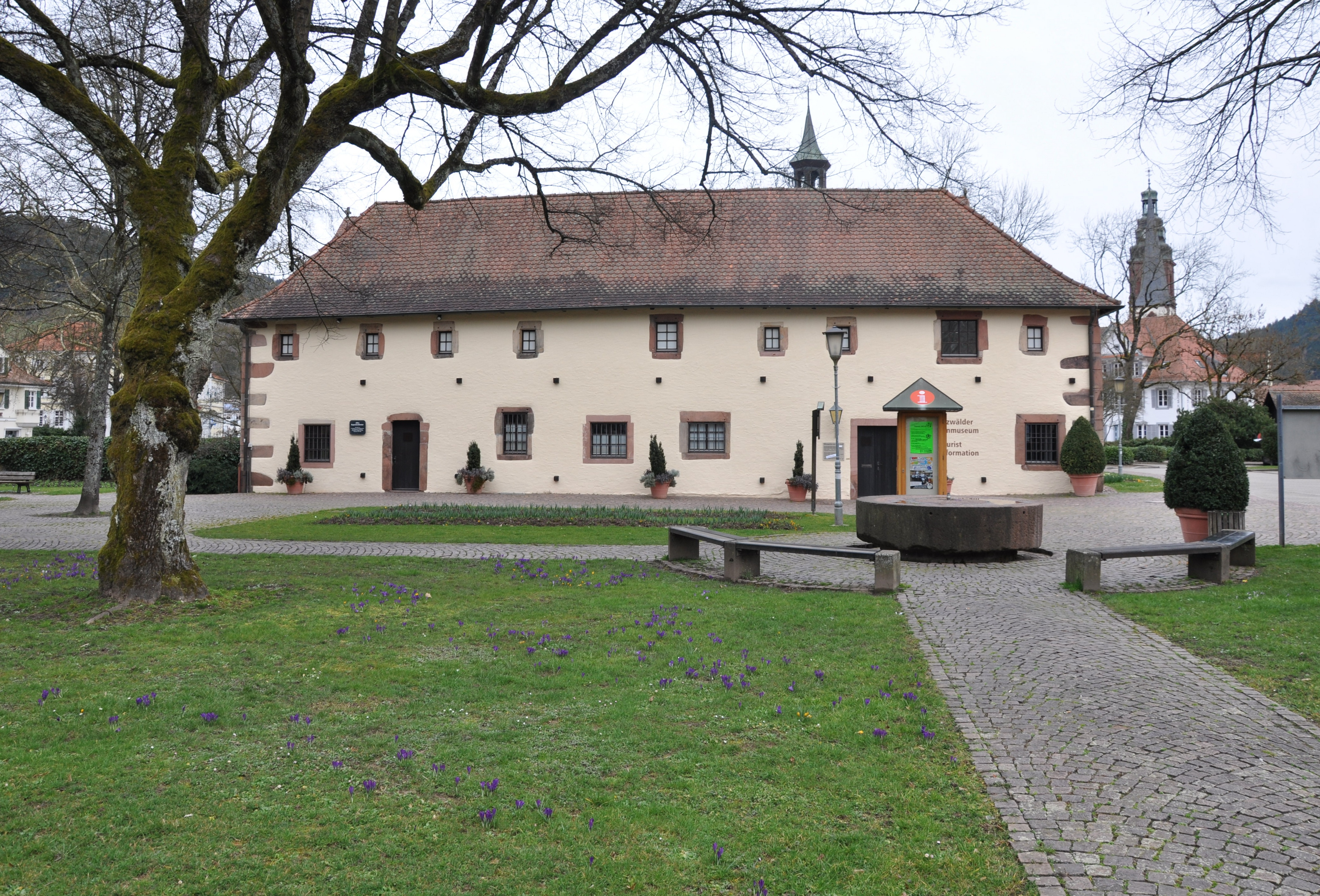
The Old Capuchin abbey from the outside II

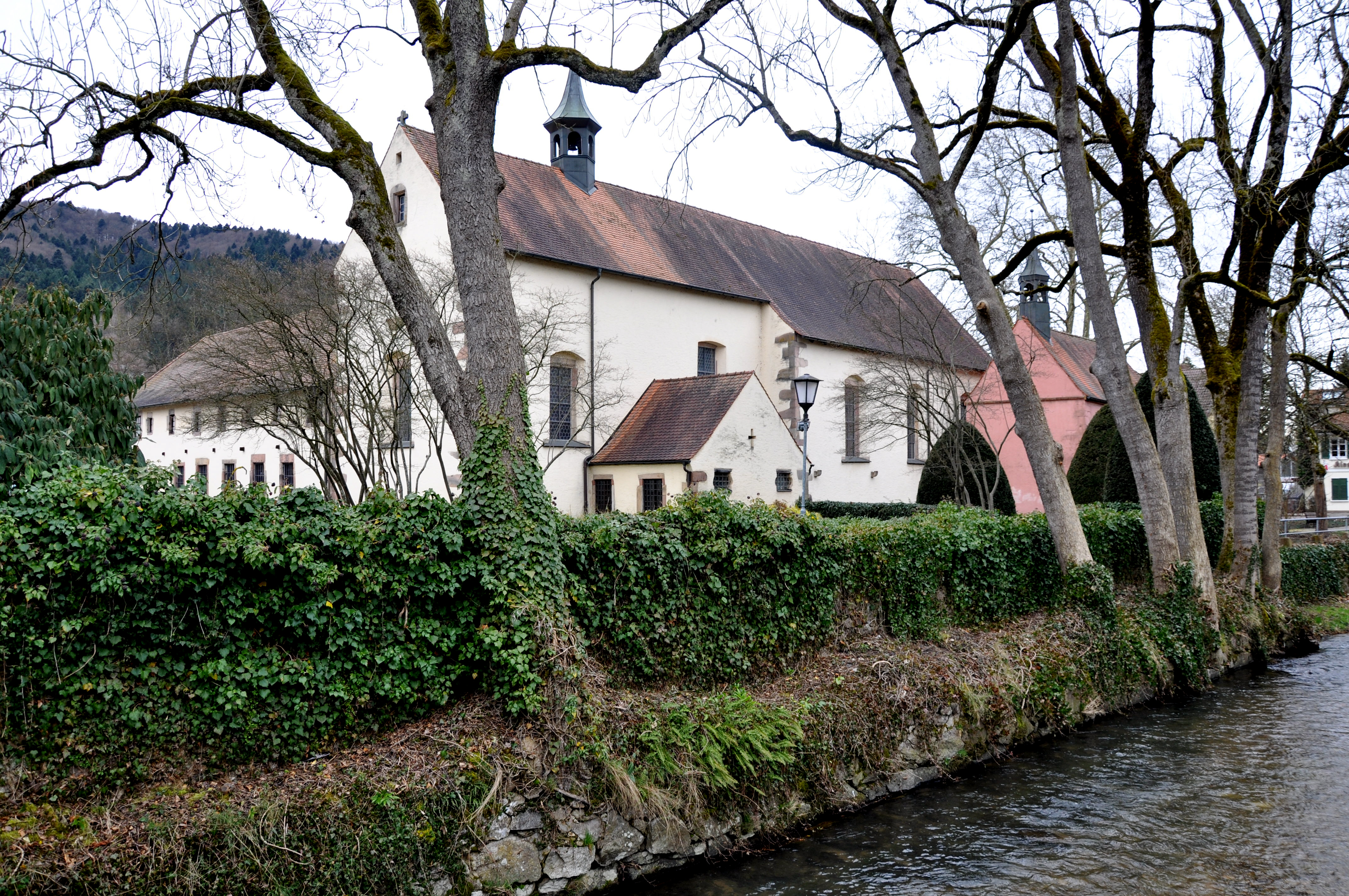
The Old capuchin abbey

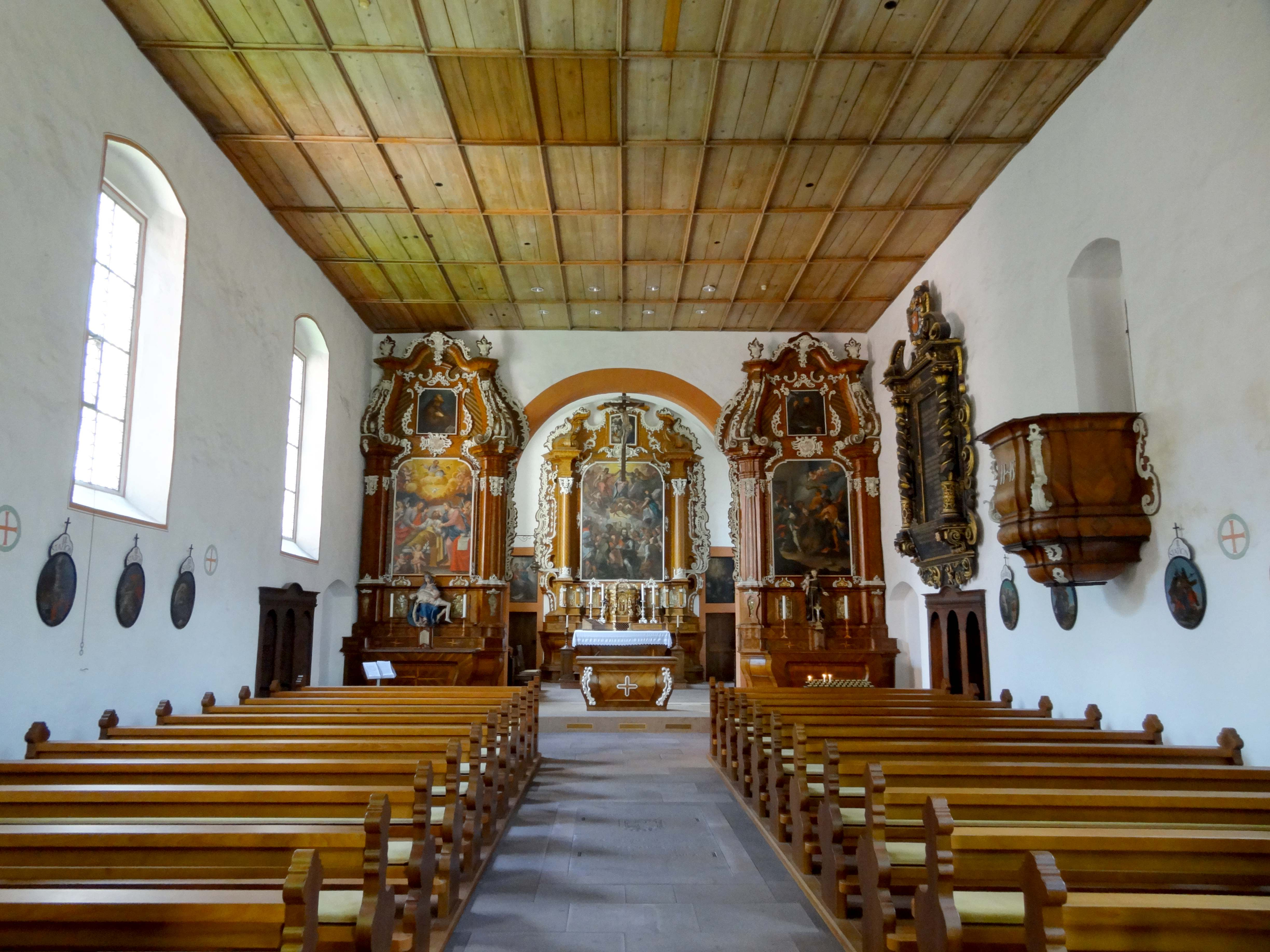
Church of the former Capuchin abbey

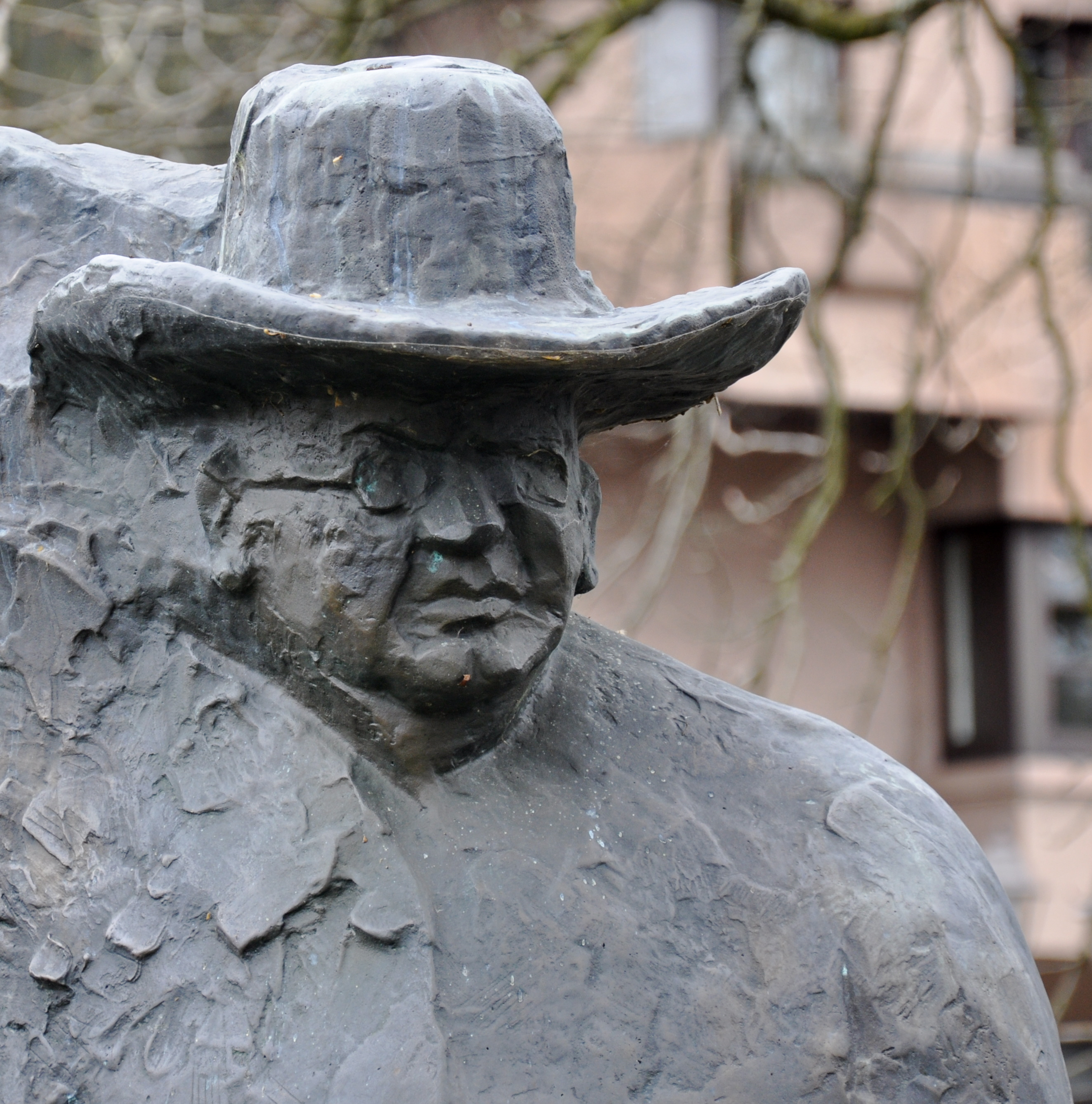
Hansjakob statue

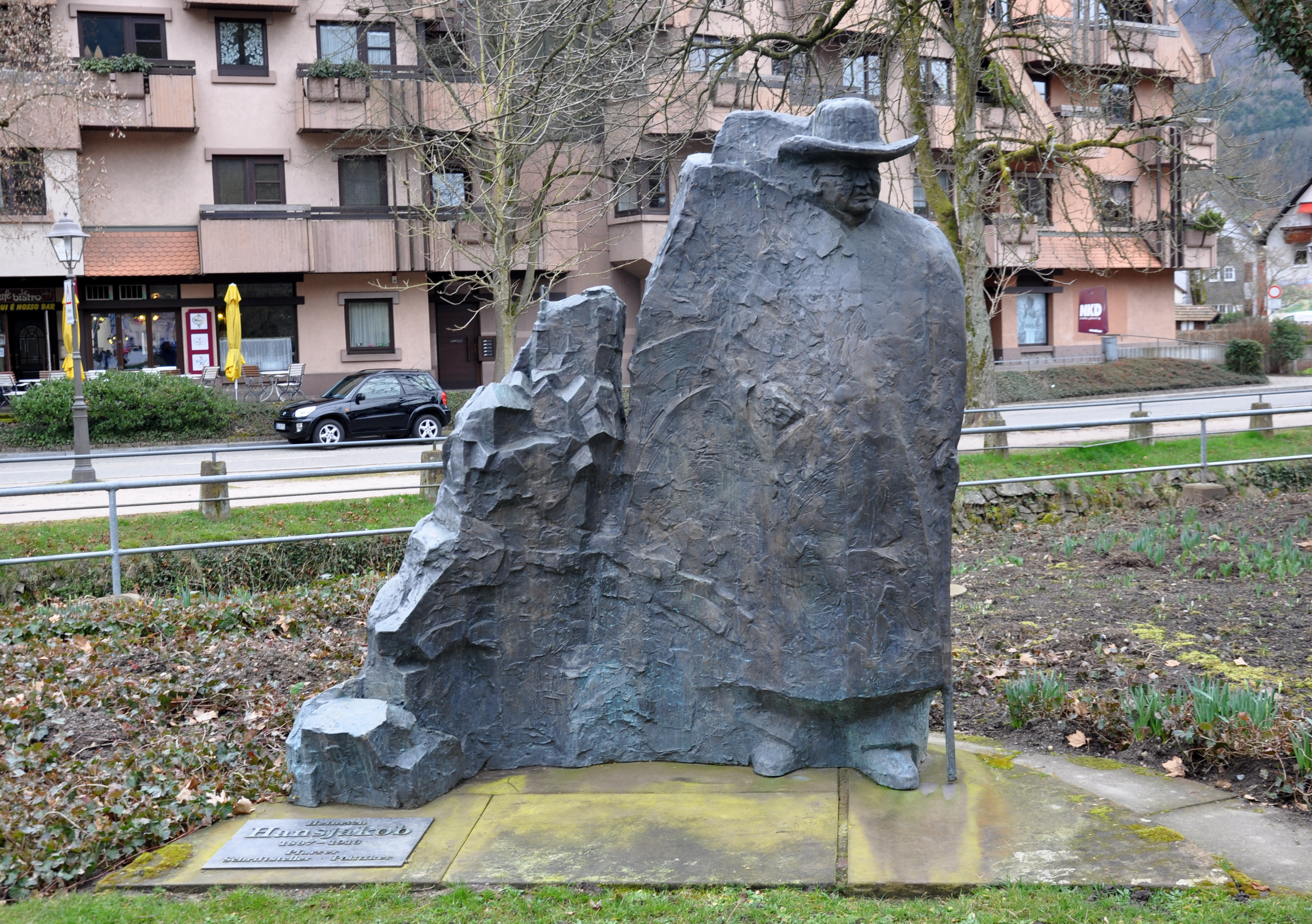
Hansjakob statue

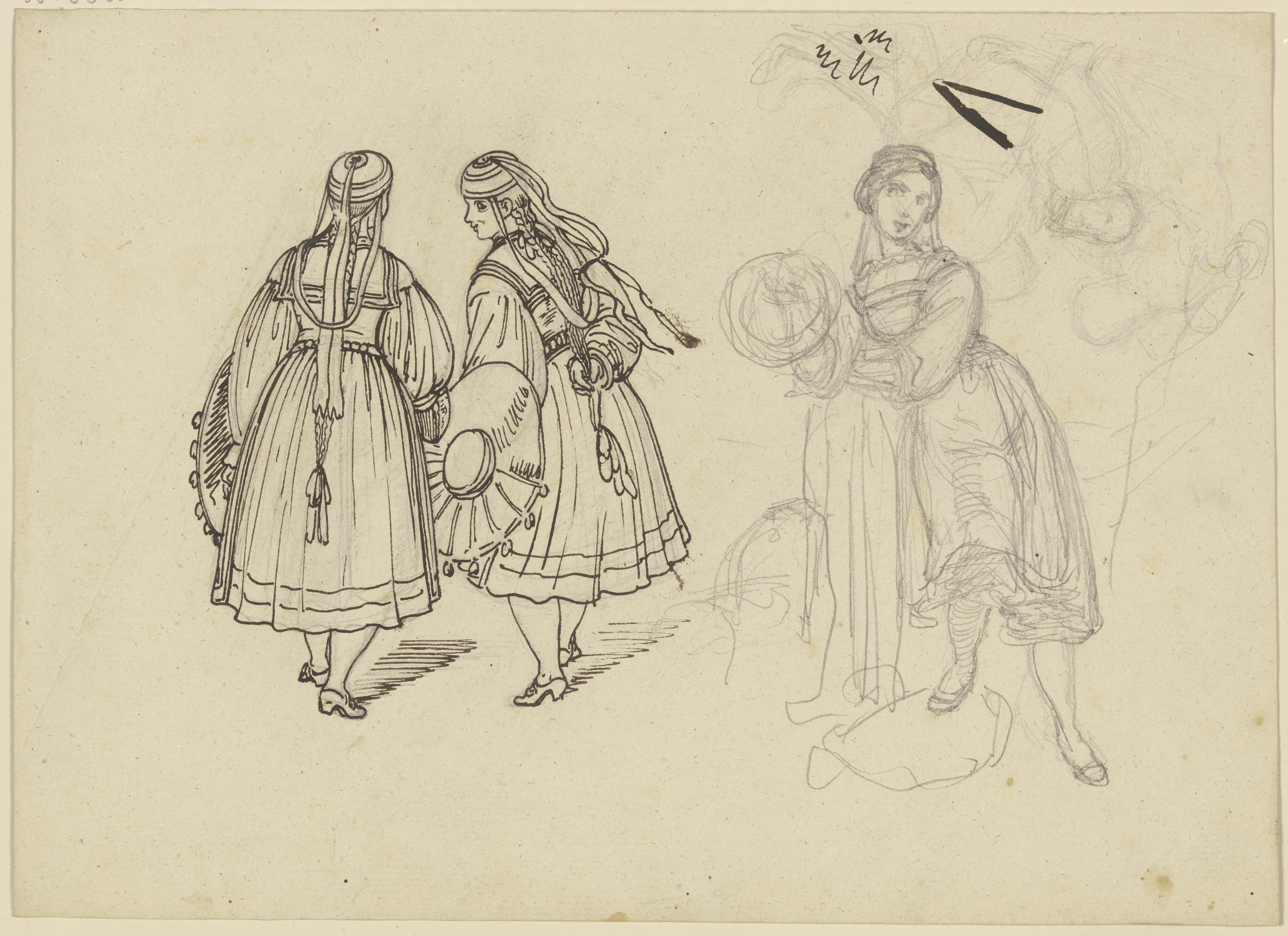
"Three Maidens from the Black Forest"

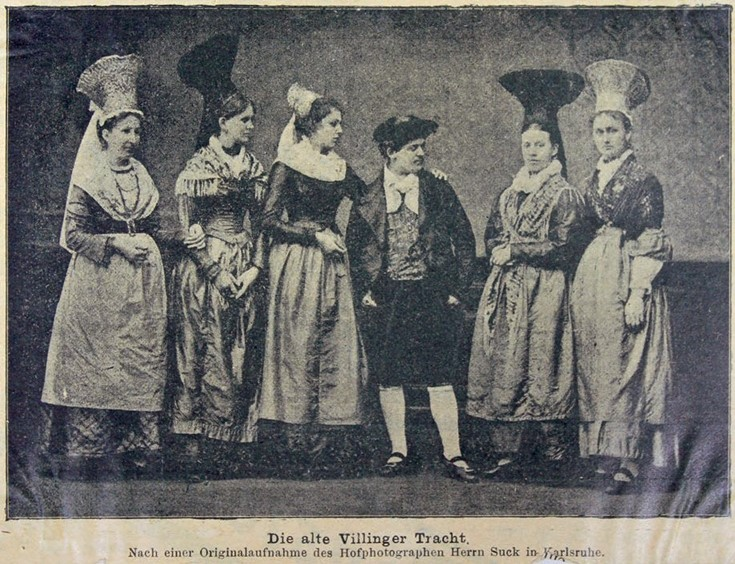
Villinger Tracht (1892)

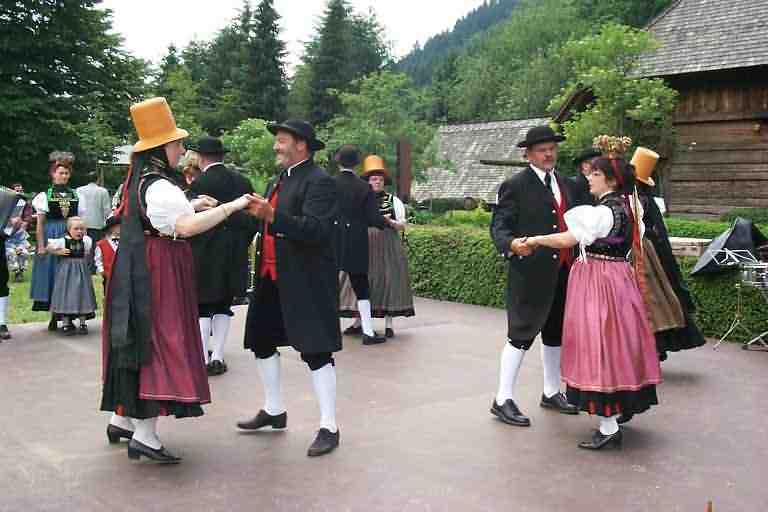
Schwarzwälder Tracht worn by people from Furtwangen

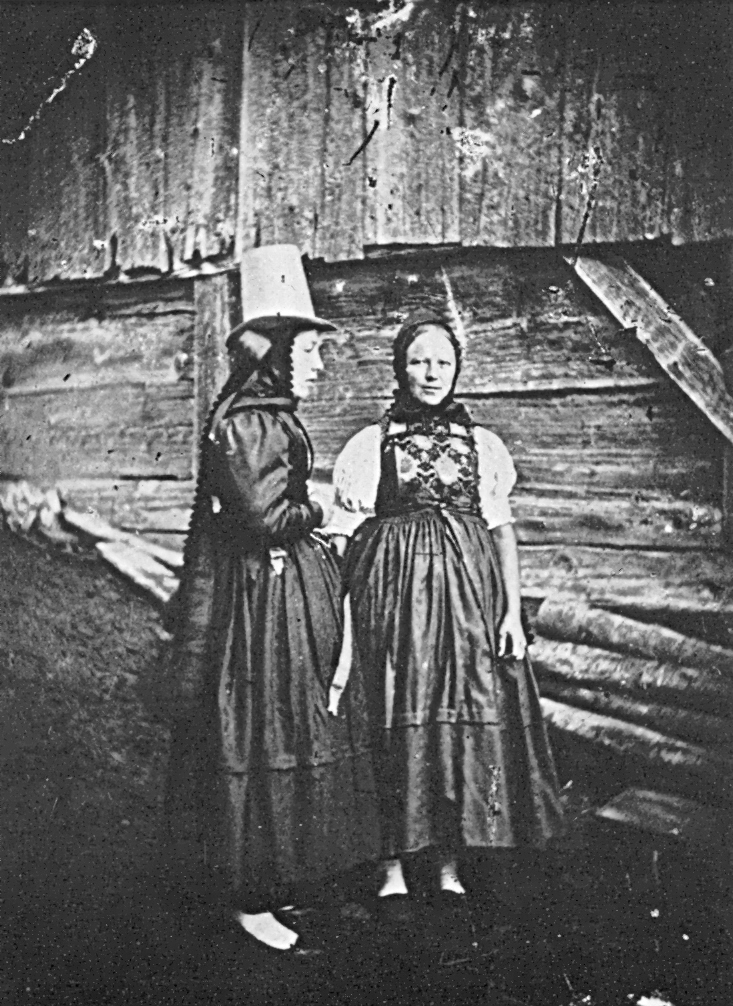
Schwarzwälder Tracht
