= Curt Liebich =

German painter, graphic artist and sculptor

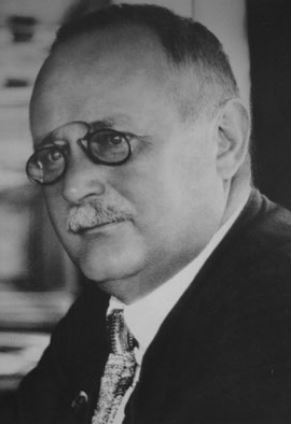
Curt Liebich (1920s)

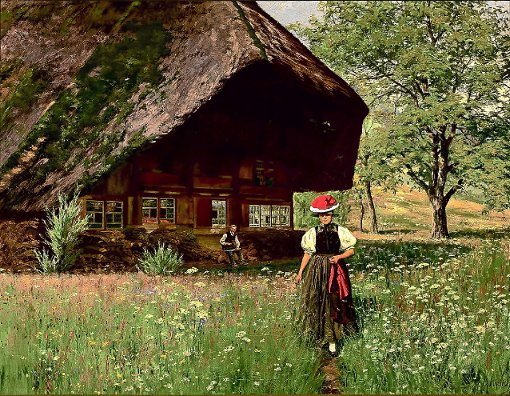
Laublehof (woman in a bollenhut, outside a traditional Black Forest house)

Curt Liebich (17 November 1868 – 12 December 1937) was a German painter, graphic artist and sculptor.

== Life and work ==
He was born in Wesel. After some initial training in Dresden, he transferred to the Berlin University of the Arts. After 1890, he studied at the Grand-Ducal Saxon Art School, Weimar. There, he met the famous "Black Forest Painter", Wilhelm Hasemann.

In 1896, he married Hasemann's sister-in-law, Antonie Lichtenberg, and settled in Gutach, where he painted scenes of rural and village life. He also created postcard motifs that made the bollenhut (a formal headdress) and the Black Forest house familiar throughout the world. As an illustrator, he designed title pages for books and magazines as well as advertising graphics. Together with Hasemann, he established the Gutach artists' colony.

During and after World War I, he helped create several war memorials; in Dunningen, Laufenburg, Meissenheim, Rhina and Schapbach. In 1917, he was named a professor by Frederick II, Grand Duke of Baden.

Antonie died in 1919. The following year, he married her younger sister, Emma. In 1923, he was named an honorary citizen of Gutach. In 1933, he designed the Gutacher honorary citizenship certificates for Robert Heinrich Wagner and Adolf Hitler. Liebich died on 12 December 1937 in Gutach.

The Kunstmuseum Hasemann-Liebich, featuring works by both artists, was opened in Gutach in 2005.
