= Kirbach (river) =

River in Germany

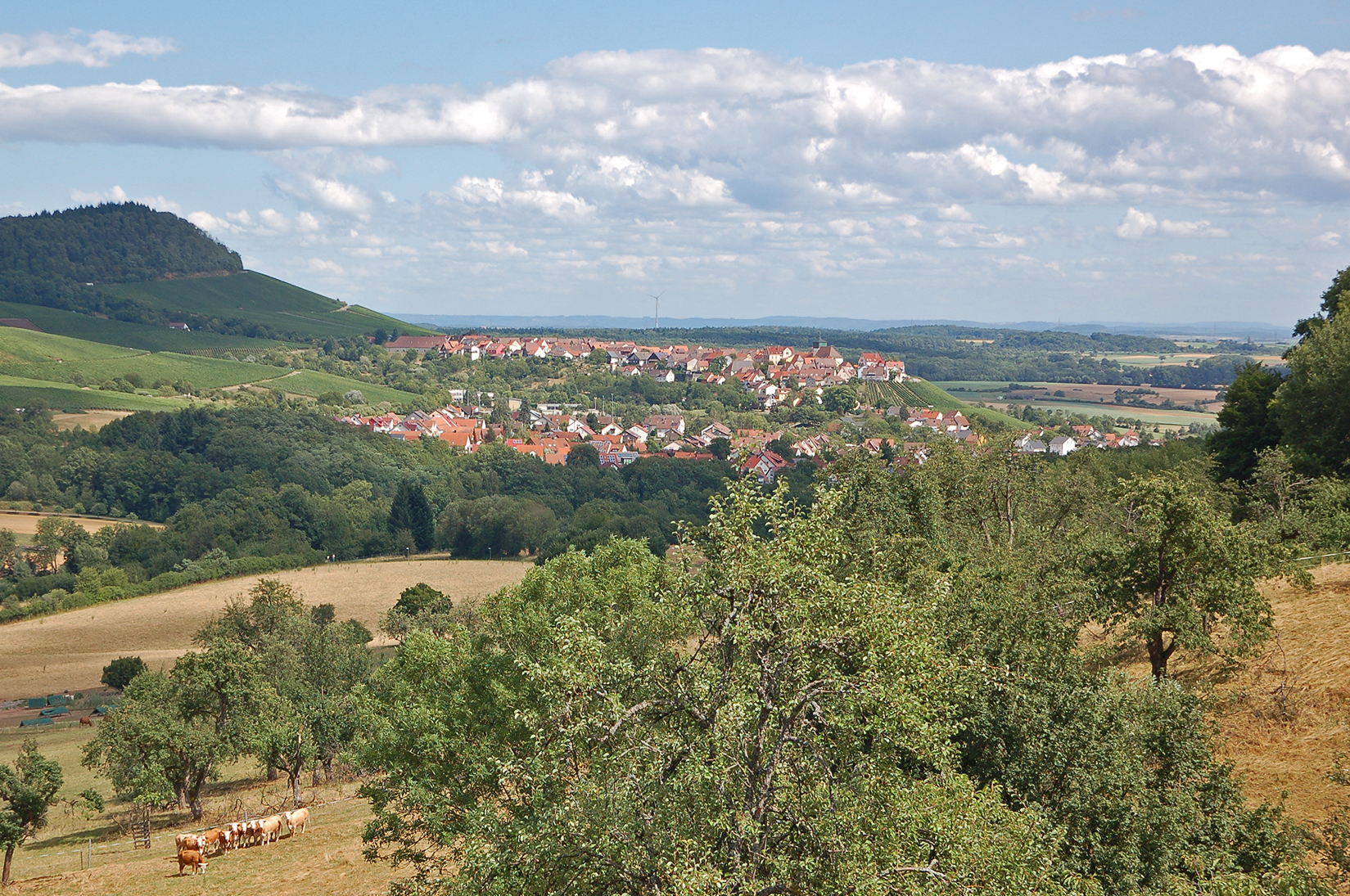

Location
- Country: Germany
- State: Baden-Württemberg

Physical characteristics
- Mouth
  - location: Metter
  - coordinates: 48.9636°N 9.0569°E
- Length: 20.8 km (12.9 mi)

Basin features
- Progression: Metter→ Enz→ Neckar→ Rhine→ North Sea

Kirbach is a river of Baden-Württemberg, Germany. It flows into the Metter in Sachsenheim.

== See also ==
- List of rivers of Baden-Württemberg
