= Reichenbach (Hornberg) =

- Ortsteil of Hornberg
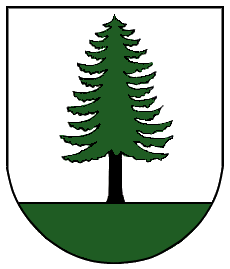
- Coat of arms
- Interactive map of Reichenbach
- Location within Germany Location within Baden-Württemberg
- Coordinates: 48°12′37″N 8°16′50″E
- Country: Germany
- State: Baden-Württemberg
- Town: Hornberg
- Time zone: UTC+01:00 (CET)
  - Summer (DST): UTC+02:00 (CEST)
- Postal codes: 78132
- Dialling codes: 07833

Reichenbach (German pronunciation: [ˈʁaɪçn̩ˌbax]) is a village in the municipality of Hornberg in the Black Forest in Germany. The territory of the town of Hornberg very small in comparison with its villages and restricted mainly to the valley bottom of the Gutach stream and the lower region of the Reichenbach valley. The village of Reichenbach covers the largest area in the municipality.

== Geography and geology ==
Reichenbach is a dispersed settlement of around 650 inhabitants and covers the valleys east and west of Hornberg. In the east is the actual valley of the Reichenbach and those of the Schwanenbach, Schonenbächle and their side valleys. In the west the Offenbach- und Frombach valleys and side valleys belong to Reichenbach. The highest elevation in Reichenbach is the Windkapf with a height of 928 metres above Normalnull.

The mountain range here consists mainly of granite. In the parish there are numerous woolsack rocks, of which the Igellochfelsen is the best known. In the eastern part of the parish, by the Fohrenbühl, bunter sandstone lies on top of the granite and was commercially quarried until the 1920s.

== Literature ==
- Stadtverwaltung Hornberg (publ.): 900 Jahre Hornberg, Konkordia, Bühl [Baden], 1993.
