= Hornberg =

- City
- Coat of arms

- Location of Hornberg within Ortenaukreis district
- Interactive map of Hornberg
- Location within Germany Location within Baden-Württemberg
- Coordinates: 48°12′48″N 08°13′51″E
- Country: Germany
- State: Baden-Württemberg
- Admin. region: Freiburg
- District: Ortenaukreis

Government
  - Mayor (2023–31): Marc Thomas Winzer

Area
  - Total: 54.45 km^{2} (21.02 sq mi)
- Elevation: 384 m (1,260 ft)

Population (2025-12-31)
  - Total: 4,157
  - Density: 76.35/km^{2} (197.7/sq mi)
- Time zone: UTC+01:00 (CET)
  - Summer (DST): UTC+02:00 (CEST)
- Postal codes: 78132
- Dialling codes: 07833
- Vehicle registration: OG, BH, KEL, LR, WOL
- Website: www.hornberg.de

Hornberg (German pronunciation: [ˈhɔʁnˌbɛʁk]) is a town in the Ortenaukreis, in western Baden-Württemberg, Germany. It is situated in the Black Forest, 35 km southeast of Offenburg, and 25 km northwest of Villingen-Schwenningen.

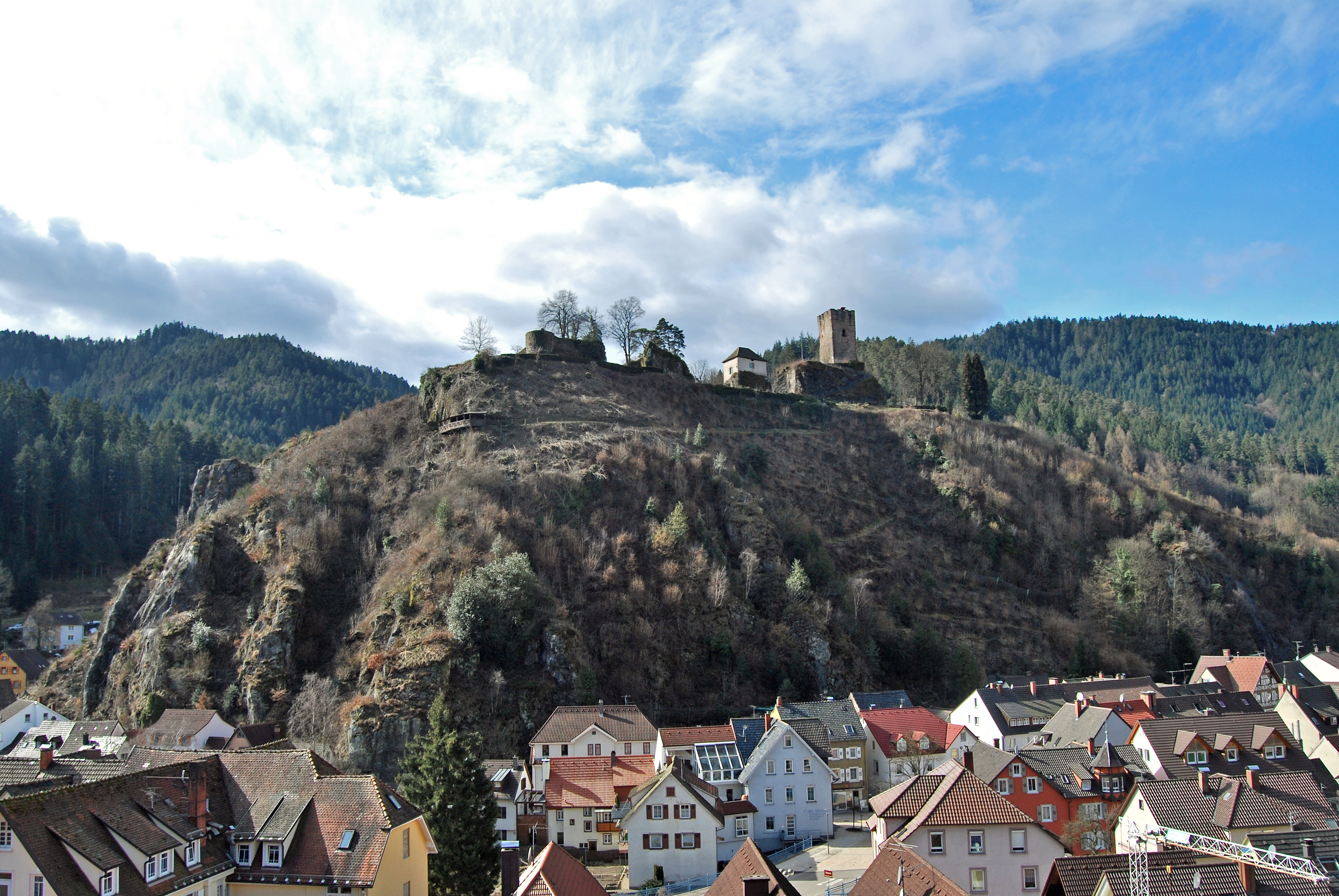
Castle of Hornberg

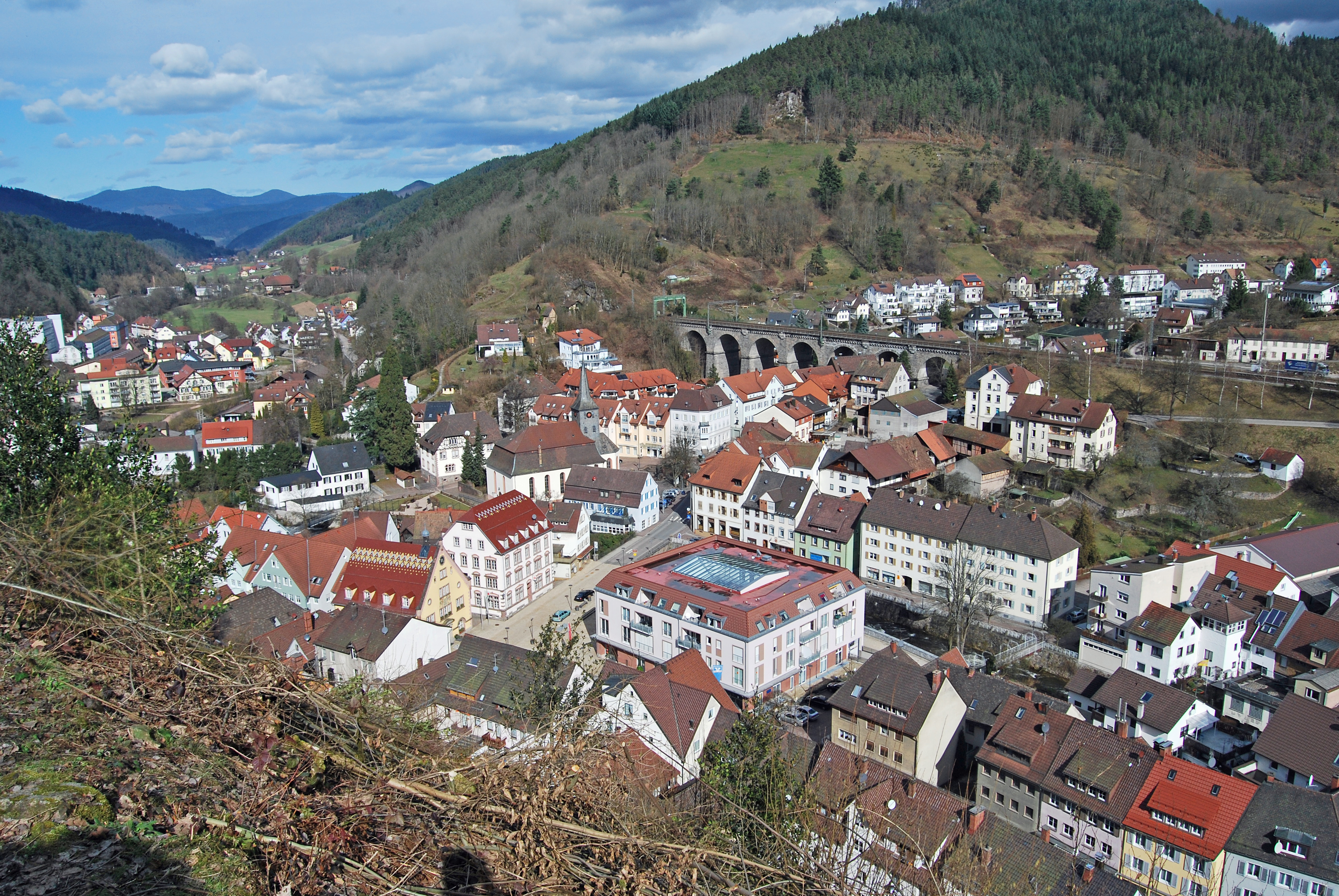
Hornberg

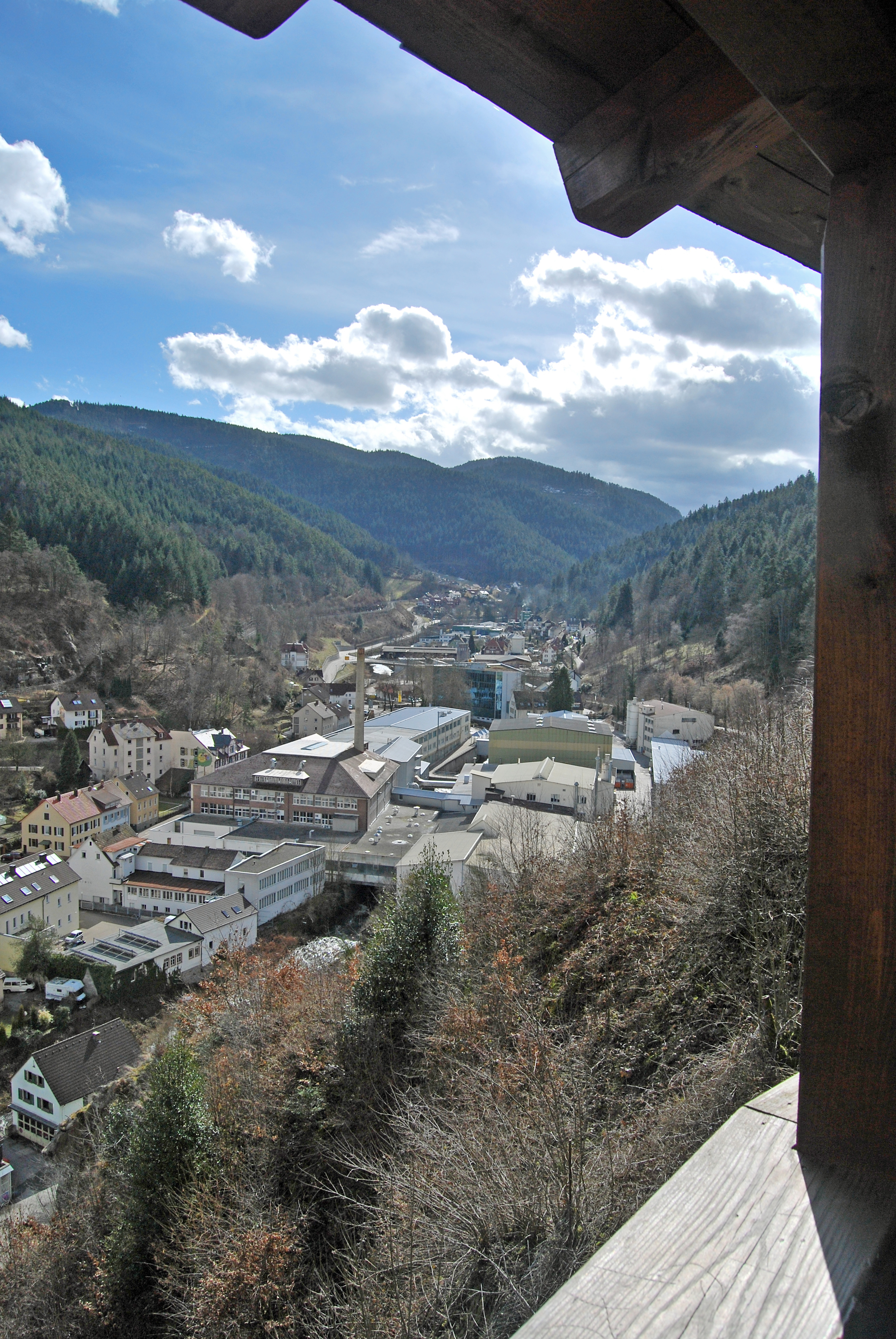
Duravit

== Local activities ==
Hornberg is the location of the Duravit Design Center. The center has a viewing platform designed by Philippe Starck. This viewing platform is arguably the largest toilet bowl in the world. Duravit also has a production facility in Hornberg.

The family brewery M. Ketterer GmbH & Co.KG is also located in Hornberg.

== Black Forest Railway (German: Schwarzwaldbahn) ==
Hornberg has a railway station on the Black Forest Railway. The route the railway takes to Sankt Georgen im Schwarzwald is considered one of the most spectacular parts of the route.

== Sons and daughters of the town ==
- Andreas Beck (born 1948), physician (head of the radiology department of the hospital Konstanz), theologian and writer
- Wilhelm Hausenstein (1882–1957), writer, art critic and cultural historian, journalist and diplomat
- Friedrich Jeckeln (1895–1946), Nazi SS officer and Police Leader executed for war crimes
- Thomas Schäuble (1948–2013), German politician (CDU), Director of the Baden State Brewery Rothaus, brother of Wolfgang Schäuble

== Personalities who were active in Hornberg ==
- Rochus Misch (1917–2013), bodyguard and telephone operator for Adolf Hitler; had a business for painters in Hornberg before the war
- Wolfgang Schäuble (1942–2023), German politician (CDU), grew up in Hornberg
- Reinold of Urslingen (around 1364-1442), Knight, 1437 share ownership of the castle and city Hornberg
