= Tournoi Indoor de Paris-Bercy =

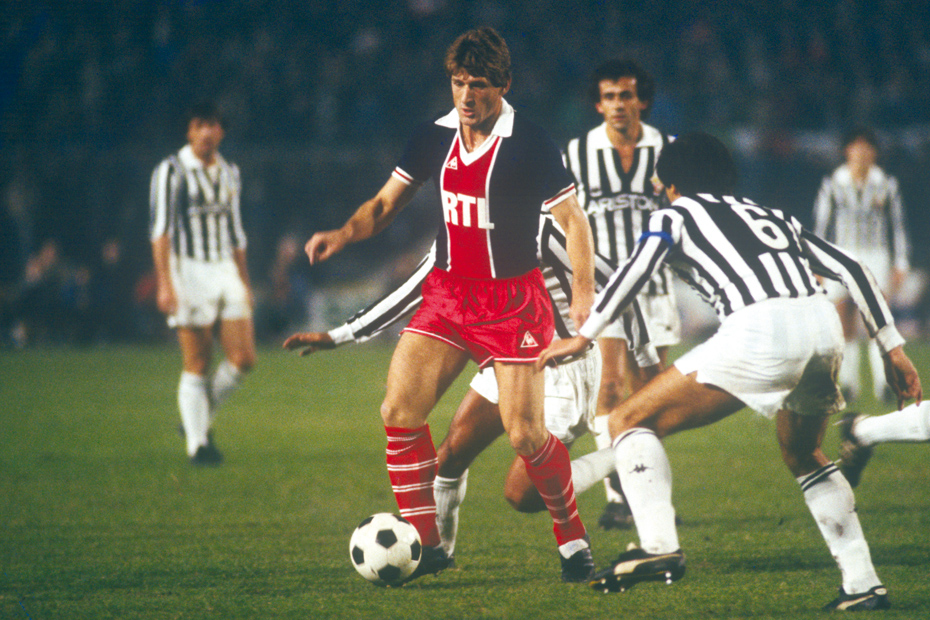
- Led by Safet Sušić, PSG won two titles in 1987 and 1990.
- Organiser(s): (France) Paris Saint-Germain
- Founded: 1984; 42 years ago
- Abolished: 1991; 35 years ago
- Teams: 6
- Last champions: (Ukraine) Dynamo Kyiv (1st title)
- Most championships: (France) Paris Saint-Germain (2 titles)

The Tournoi Indoor de Paris-Bercy was an invitational indoor football competition organized by French club Paris Saint-Germain FC at the Accor Arena in Paris, France. Founded in 1984, it was staged annually until 1991. The tournament was played indoors on a synthetic pitch with seven-a-side teams and featured the host club alongside five invited teams.

Hamburger SV won the inaugural edition in 1984, while Dynamo Kyiv claimed the final tournament in 1991. PSG were the most successful club in the competition's history, winning the title twice and remaining the only team to do so. Other winners included 1. FC Köln, Anderlecht, Santos, and Ajax, each of whom lifted the trophy once.

The competition took place over two nights, with six teams divided into two groups in the first round. The top teams advanced to a Winners' Group to determine first to third place, while the remaining teams competed in a Qualifying Group for fourth to sixth place. Teams earned two points for a win and one for a draw, with standings determined by points, goal difference, and goals scored.

Matches consisted of two short halves and were played under modified indoor rules. There was no offside rule, no throw-ins, and the surrounding walls remained in play. Fouls could result in temporary suspensions or dismissals, and play was restarted with a free kick if the ball went out of bounds or struck the ceiling.

== History ==
=== Rules ===
The tournament was played over two nights at the Accor Arena, with six teams divided into two groups in the first round. The top teams advanced to a Winners' Group to compete for first to third place, while the remaining teams entered a Qualifying Group for fourth to sixth place. Teams received two points for a win and one point for a draw. Matches consisted of two 14-minute halves, with seven players per side and unlimited substitutions. The tournament used modified rules, including no offside rule, the use of walls instead of throw-ins, and disciplinary suspensions for fouls. If the ball went out of play or struck the ceiling, play was restarted with a free kick. Final rankings were determined by points, followed by goal difference and goals scored.

=== Editions ===
Paris Saint-Germain struggled in the first three editions of the Tournoi Indoor de Paris-Bercy, finishing in the bottom two on each occasion. Hamburger SV won the inaugural tournament in 1984, followed by Anderlecht in 1985 and Santos in 1986. PSG won their first title in 1987 after recovering from an opening loss to Porto and beating Girondins de Bordeaux, with a brace from Jules Bocandé. Safet Sušić was named tournament MVP as PSG defeated both Olympique de Marseille and Porto in the Winners' Group. Bocandé's hat-trick secured victory over Marseille, while PSG recorded a 6–2 win against Porto with contributions from Bocandé, Claude Lowitz, and Dominique Rocheteau.

PSG failed to defend their title in 1988, losing in the first round to eventual champions 1. FC Köln. In 1989, Safet Sušić scored a record eleven goals in a single edition, but PSG lost to Red Star Belgrade and eventual winners Ajax, finishing fourth. In 1990, PSG won their second title. After an 8–0 win over Partizan, they lost 5–2 to Malmö but later defeated them 4–3 in the final, with goals from Pascal Nouma, Sušić, and David Rinçon. In 1991, the final edition, PSG again failed to retain the trophy, finishing fifth after a 7–4 loss to Benfica, despite goals from Francis Llacer, Jocelyn Angloma, and Rinçon. Dynamo Kyiv were crowned champions.

== Statistics ==
=== Finals ===
The tournament was held 8 times between 1984 and 1991.

Edition	Winner	Runner-up	Third	Fourth	Fifth	Sixth
1984	(Germany) Hamburger SV	(France) Monaco	(Algeria) JS Kabylie	(Brazil) Fluminense	(France) Paris Saint-Germain	(France) Girondins de Bordeaux
1985	(Belgium) Anderlecht	(Germany) Bayern Munich	Morocco	(France) Auxerre	(Brazil) Flamengo	(France) Paris Saint-Germain
1986	(Brazil) Santos	(Germany) Borussia Mönchengladbach	(Belgium) RFC Liège	(Spain) Real Sociedad	(France) Paris Saint-Germain	(Croatia) Hajduk Split
1987	(France) Paris Saint-Germain	(France) Olympique de Marseille	(Portugal) Porto	(Germany) Bayern Munich	(France) Girondins de Bordeaux	Tunisia
1988	(Germany) 1. FC Köln	(Russia) Spartak Moscow	(France) Nantes	(France) Auxerre	(France) Paris Saint-Germain	(Brazil) Botafogo
1989	(Netherlands) Ajax	(France) Nantes	(Serbia) Red Star Belgrade	(France) Paris Saint-Germain	Senegal	(Spain) Real Sociedad
1990	(France) Paris Saint-Germain	(Sweden) Malmö	(France) Nantes	(Portugal) Porto	(Serbia) Partizan	(England) Aston Villa
1991	(Ukraine) Dynamo Kyiv	(Germany) Werder Bremen	(Croatia) Hajduk Split	(Portugal) Benfica	(France) Paris Saint-Germain	(Tunisia) Espérance

=== Titles by club ===
The tournament had 7 different champions.

Team	Titles	Years won
(France) Paris Saint-Germain	2	1987, 1990
(Germany) Hamburger SV	1	1984
(Belgium) Anderlecht	1	1985
(Brazil) Santos	1	1986
(Germany) 1. FC Köln	1	1988
(Netherlands) Ajax	1	1989
(Ukraine) Dynamo Kyiv	1	1991
