= Paris Saint-Germain FC =

French football club

Paris Saint-Germain
- Full name: Paris Saint-Germain Football Club
- Nicknames: Les Parisiens (The Parisians); Les Rouge-et-Bleu (The Red-and-Blues)
- Short name: PSG, Paris, Paris SG
- Founded: 12 August 1970; 56 years ago
- Stadium: Parc des Princes
- Capacity: 47,929
- Owner(s): Qatar Sports Investments (85.9%); Arctos Partners (12.5%); Boardroom (1.6%)
- President: Nasser Al-Khelaifi
- Head coach: Luis Enrique
- League: Ligue 1
- 2025–26: Ligue 1, 1st of 18 (champions)
- Website: PSG.FR
Home colours	Away colours

Paris Saint-Germain Football Club, commonly referred to as Paris Saint-Germain (French: [paʁi sɛ̃ʒɛʁmɛ̃], ult. ref. "Saint Germanus"), PSG, Paris, or Paris SG, is a French professional football club based in Paris. Founded in 1970 through the merger of Paris FC and Stade Saint-Germain, the club competes in Ligue 1, the highest division of French football, and plays its home matches at the Parc des Princes. PSG is France's most widely supported football club and one of the most followed clubs worldwide. The club has rivalries with Olympique de Marseille, against whom it contests Le Classique, and Paris FC in the Paris derby.

PSG is the most successful club in French football, with 60 major trophies. Domestically, the club holds the records for most Ligue 1 titles (14), Coupe de France (16), Coupe de la Ligue (9) and Trophée des Champions (14). The club has also won one Ligue 2 title. PSG is also the most decorated French club in international competitions, having won two UEFA Champions League and two UEFA Super Cup titles, as well as one UEFA Cup Winners' Cup, one UEFA Intertoto Cup, and one FIFA Intercontinental Cup, all French records.

Before the club's takeover by Qatar Sports Investments (QSI) in 2011, PSG had won 18 trophies, including two European titles, two Ligue 1 championships and 13 national cups, placing among the top five in French football at the time. Following QSI's acquisition of the club, the club entered a period of sustained domestic dominance, attracting numerous high-profile players and becoming the country's most successful club. Under manager Luis Enrique, PSG also established itself as a dominant force in international football, winning consecutive UEFA Champions League and UEFA Super Cup titles, the FIFA Intercontinental Cup, as well as a continental treble and sextuple in 2025.

Since 2011, PSG have been majority-owned by QSI, with Arctos Partners acquiring a minority stake in 2023 and Boardroom in 2025. As of May 2026, the club is the wealthiest in France and ranks among the richest and most valuable football clubs in the world. In addition to its men's football team, PSG operates a youth academy, a women's football team, and sections in handball, judo, and esports. The club has also previously fielded teams in basketball, volleyball, boxing, and rugby league.

== History ==
=== Formation, split and early successes (1970–1991) ===
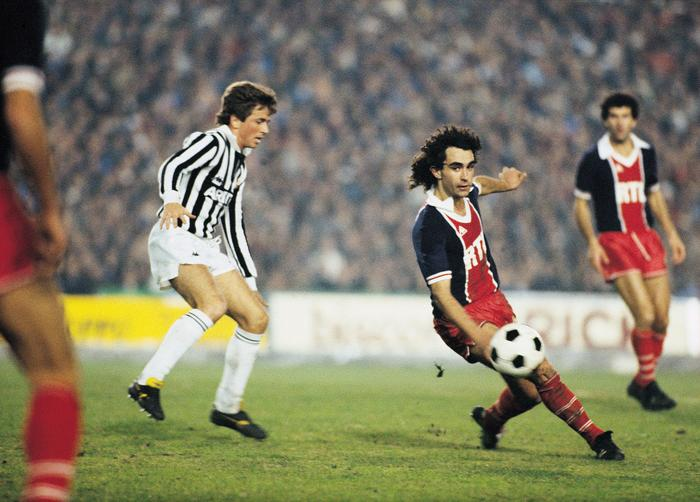
Dominique Rocheteau helped PSG win their first major title in 1982.

By the late 1960s, Paris lacked a club in the top division of French football. With support from the French Football Federation (FFF), Parisian businessmen Guy Crescent and Pierre-Étienne Guyot founded Paris FC in 1969 and later brought in Henri Patrelle, president of Stade Saint-Germain. The two clubs merged on 12 August 1970 to form Paris Saint-Germain. The club began in Ligue 2 and won the title in its first season, securing promotion to Ligue 1 for 1971–72. The club's early years were affected by financial difficulties and disagreements over its future structure. In 1972, Paris FC and PSG split. Paris FC retained its place in Ligue 1, while PSG was administratively relegated to Division 3 and continued under its existing name. PSG won back-to-back promotions and returned to Ligue 1 in 1974, moving into the Parc des Princes.

During the second half of the 1970s, Daniel Hechter became a driving force behind PSG's development and its establishment in the top flight. He became club president in 1974 and remained in the position until January 1978. Hechter was then replaced by Francis Borelli following the double-ticketing scandal at the Parc des Princes. Under Borelli, PSG won its first major trophies. The club reached its first Coupe de France final in 1982, where it faced Saint-Étienne at the Parc des Princes. After a 2–2 draw following extra time, PSG won the final on penalties to claim its first major trophy. The club retained the Coupe de France the following year by defeating Nantes 3–2 in the final.

PSG continued to develop as a leading French club during the 1980s and featured several notable players, including Jean-Pierre Dogliani, Mustapha Dahleb, Safet Sušić, Luis Fernandez and Dominique Rocheteau. In 1986, under manager Gérard Houllier, the club won its first French championship. PSG finished three points ahead of Nantes and lost only three matches during the season. The championship was followed by a sporting decline and increasing financial difficulties. PSG struggled to maintain its position among the leading French clubs, with declining league performances and growing financial problems affecting the club during the latter part of Borelli's presidency.

=== First golden era and decline (1991–2011) ===
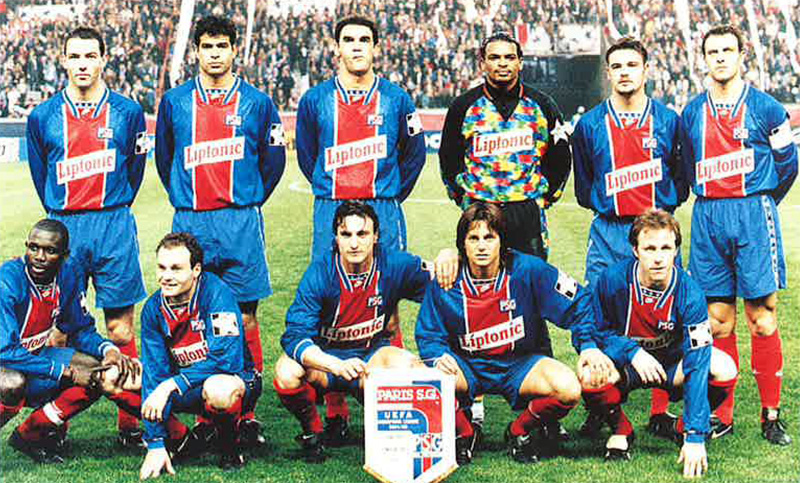
PSG team against AC Milan in 1995.

Canal+ took control of PSG in 1991, beginning a period of increased investment in the club. Michel Denisot became president, while the new ownership strengthened the squad and appointed prominent coaches. PSG recruited several high-profile players during the 1990s, including Raí, George Weah, David Ginola, Bernard Lama and Valdo. The club won the Coupe de France in 1993, defeating Nantes 3–0 in the final, and won its second French championship in 1994.

PSG also became a regular participant in European competition. In the 1994–95 UEFA Champions League, the club won its group and advanced to the semi-finals, where it was eliminated by AC Milan. In 1996, PSG won its first European trophy by defeating Rapid Wien 1–0 in the UEFA Cup Winners' Cup final in Brussels, with Bruno Ngotty scoring the only goal. PSG reached the same competition's final again in 1997 but lost 1–0 to Barcelona. The club continued to win domestic trophies during the late 1990s. PSG won the Coupe de la Ligue in 1998 and defeated Lens in the Coupe de France final later that year to complete a domestic cup double.

Despite having notable players such as Jay-Jay Okocha, Ronaldinho and Pauleta, PSG's results became less consistent after the end of the 1990s. Changes in management, sporting directors and ownership were accompanied by a decline in league performances. PSG remained capable of winning domestic trophies, taking the Coupe de France in 2004, 2006 and 2010 and the Coupe de la Ligue in 2008, but spent several seasons outside the upper positions of Ligue 1. The club finished 15th in 2006–07 and 16th in 2007–08, its lowest league finishes during this period. In 2008, Colony Capital became PSG's majority shareholder. The club subsequently improved its league position, finishing sixth in 2008–09, 13th in 2009–10 and fourth in 2010–11. PSG also won the Coupe de France in 2010, defeating Monaco 1–0 after extra time.

=== Rise to European dominance (2011–present) ===
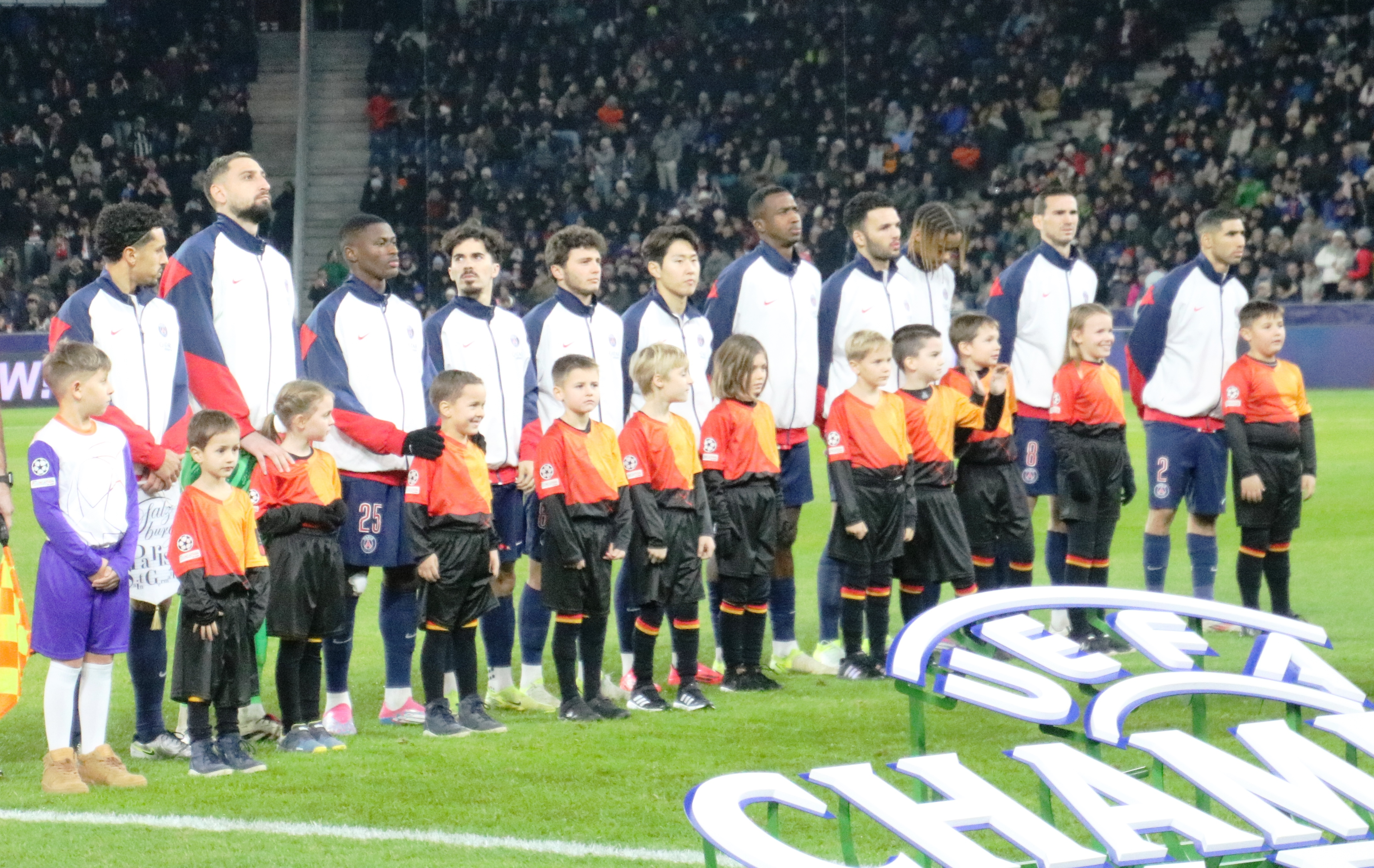
PSG during their UEFA Champions League title-winning campaign in 2025.

In 2011, Qatar Sports Investments (QSI) acquired a majority stake in PSG and subsequently became the club's sole owner. Nasser Al-Khelaifi became president, and the new ownership significantly increased investment in the playing squad. Early major signings included Javier Pastore, Zlatan Ibrahimović, Thiago Silva, Edinson Cavani and Marco Verratti. After finishing as runners-up in 2012, PSG won Ligue 1 in 2013, their first league championship since 1994, and successfully defended it in 2014. The club subsequently established sustained domestic dominance, winning multiple Ligue 1 championships and cup titles. In 2014–15, PSG became the first French club to win all four major domestic trophies in a single season: Ligue 1, the Coupe de France, the Coupe de la Ligue and the Trophée des Champions. The club repeated the feat in 2015–16, when it also set a Ligue 1 record with 96 points.

PSG then built a squad around superstars, signing Neymar from Barcelona and Kylian Mbappé from Monaco in 2017, before Lionel Messi joined the club in 2021. The trio helped PSG win further domestic trophies but did not deliver a Champions League title. During this period, PSG reached the Champions League final in 2020, losing 1–0 to Bayern Munich, and the semi-finals in 2021 and 2024. Neymar left the club in 2023, followed by Messi later that year, while Mbappé departed in 2024.

Following the departures of Neymar, Messi and Mbappé, PSG moved away from a squad centered on high-profile individual forwards. Under Luis Enrique, who became manager in 2023, the club placed greater emphasis on collective play, positional movement and contributions across the squad. PSG won its first Champions League title in 2025, defeating Inter Milan 5–0 in the final in Munich. Achraf Hakimi, Désiré Doué, Khvicha Kvaratskhelia and Senny Mayulu scored in the final. The victory made PSG the second French club to win the Champions League, after Marseille in 1993. PSG also claimed the 2025 UEFA Super Cup and the 2025 FIFA Intercontinental Cup, achieving an unprecedented sextuple.

PSG retained the Champions League in 2026. After finishing 11th in the league phase, the club defeated Monaco in the knockout play-offs, Chelsea in the round of 16, Liverpool in the quarter-finals, and Bayern Munich in the semi-finals. In the final at the Puskás Aréna in Budapest, Ousmane Dembélé scored PSG's goal in normal time as PSG drew 1–1 with Arsenal before winning 4–3 on penalties. PSG thus became only the second club in the Champions League era to win consecutive titles.

== Identity ==
=== Colours and mascot ===
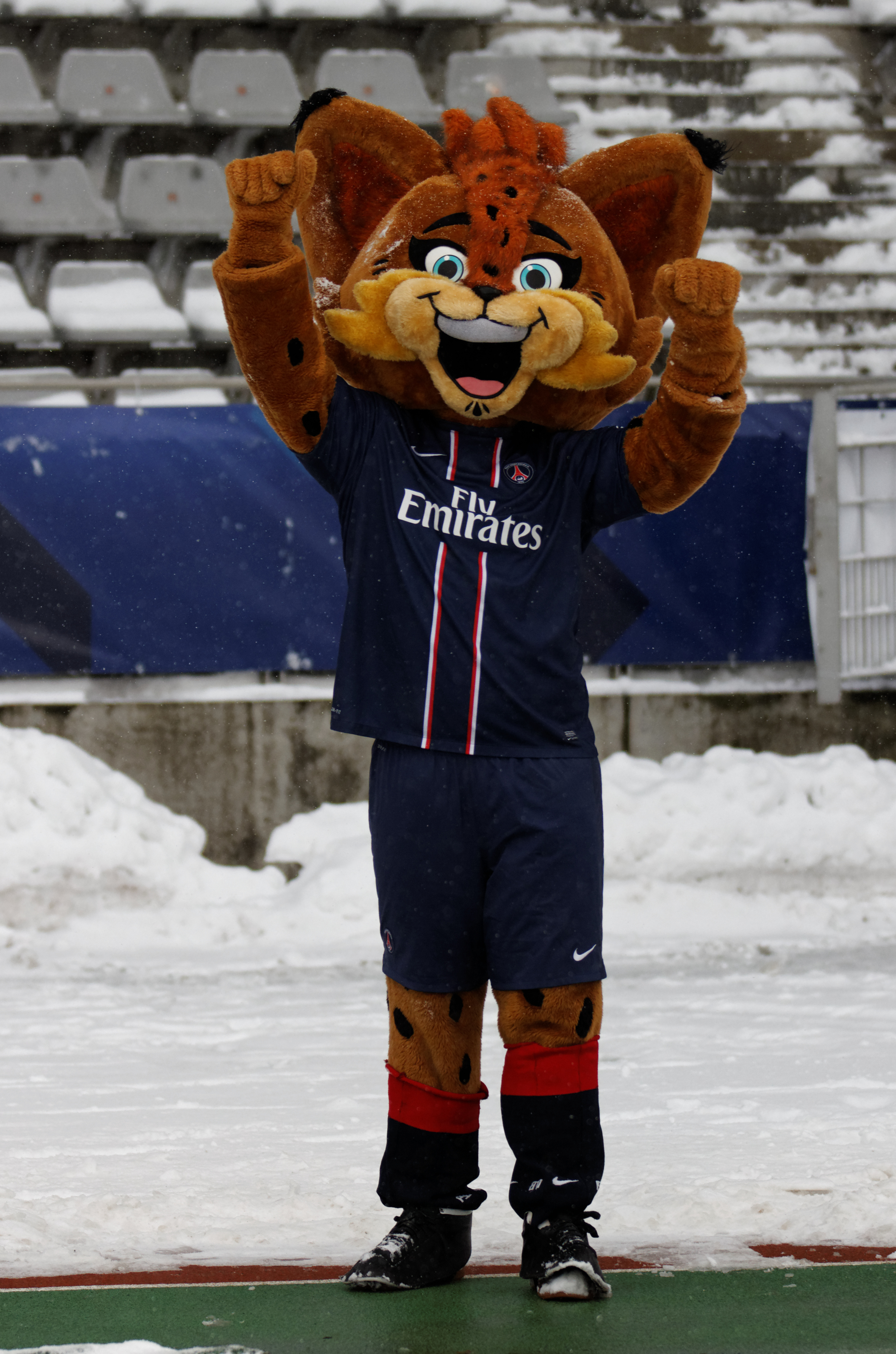
Germain the Lynx, the club's mascot.

Since their foundation, Paris Saint-Germain have represented both the city of Paris and the nearby royal town of Saint-Germain-en-Laye. As a result, red, blue and white are the club's traditional colours. The red and blue are Parisian colours, a nod to revolutionary figures Lafayette and Jean Sylvain Bailly, and the white is a symbol of French royalty and Saint-Germain-en-Laye.

On the club's crest, the Eiffel Tower in red and the blue background represent Paris, while the fleur de lys in white is a hint to the coat of arms of Saint-Germain-en-Laye. The fleur de lys is a royal symbol as well and recalls that French King Louis XIV was born in the town. Throughout its history, PSG have brandished several crests, but all of them have featured the club's three historical colours.

Likewise, PSG's most distinctive shirts have been predominantly red, blue or white, with the remaining two colours included as well. The club's official mascot, Germain the Lynx, also sports PSG's traditional colours. It was unveiled during the 2010 Tournoi de Paris in commemoration of the club's 40th anniversary, and can be seen entertaining kids in the stands of the Parc des Princes or near the pitch with the players during the warm-up.

=== Anthems and mottos ===
"Allez Paris!", recorded by Belgian actress and singer Annie Cordy in 1971, was the club's first official anthem. A dedicated PSG supporter from the very beginning, Cordy was part of an association of hundreds of celebrities who contributed to the club's founding in 1970. At that time, an appeal was made to the public to purchase season tickets at newsstands. A year later, Cordy was named PSG's official godmother and recorded the aforementioned anthem.

The club's second anthem, "Allez Paris‑Saint‑Germain!" by Les Parisiens, was recorded in 1977, replacing Annie Cordy's original version. It was produced and released by long-time PSG leader and music producer Charles Talar. The chorus became a popular chant among PSG fans during matches. A new version of the anthem, retaining the same title, was recorded in 2010 as part of the club's 40th anniversary celebrations. Performed to the tune of "Go West" by Village People, the lyrics were rewritten with input from the fans. This version serves as the club's current official anthem.

"Ô Ville Lumière", set to the tune of "Flower of Scotland", is another official club anthem for PSG fans. This chant was created by the former KoB ultra group Boulogne Boys. Other notable chants include "Le Parc est à nous" ("The Parc is ours"), "Ici, c'est Paris" ("This is Paris"), and "Paris est magique" ("Paris is magical"). "Who Said I Would" by English musician Phill Collins is also a traditional fan anthem. The song has accompanied the players' entrance onto the field since 1992. Collins was preceded by French singer Michel Fugain and his 1972 song "Attention, Ladies and Gentlemen."

"Ici, c'est Paris" and "Paris est magique" are also the club's most iconic mottos. The "Ici, c'est Paris" slogan was created by the former VA ultra group Supras Auteuil, which registered it as a trademark in 2008. PSG began incorporating the slogan into their marketing, resulting in a legal dispute with the Supras. In February 2016, the group rejected the club's offer of €2,000 for the rights to the slogan. An agreement was reached in August 2019, allowing the club to continue using the slogan in advertising while fans retained the right to use it freely.

=== Iconic shirts ===
For its first three seasons, Paris Saint-Germain's home shirt was red with blue and white detailing on the sleeves and collar to unify the club's three colours: the red and blue of Paris and the white of Saint-Germain-en-Laye. During the 2010–11 season, PSG wore a red shirt for home matches to mark its 40th anniversary. French fashion designer Daniel Hechter took over as president of PSG in 1973, and designed the club's traditional home kit that same year: a blue shirt with a red vertical stripe flanked by two thinner white stripes (blue–white–red–white–blue).

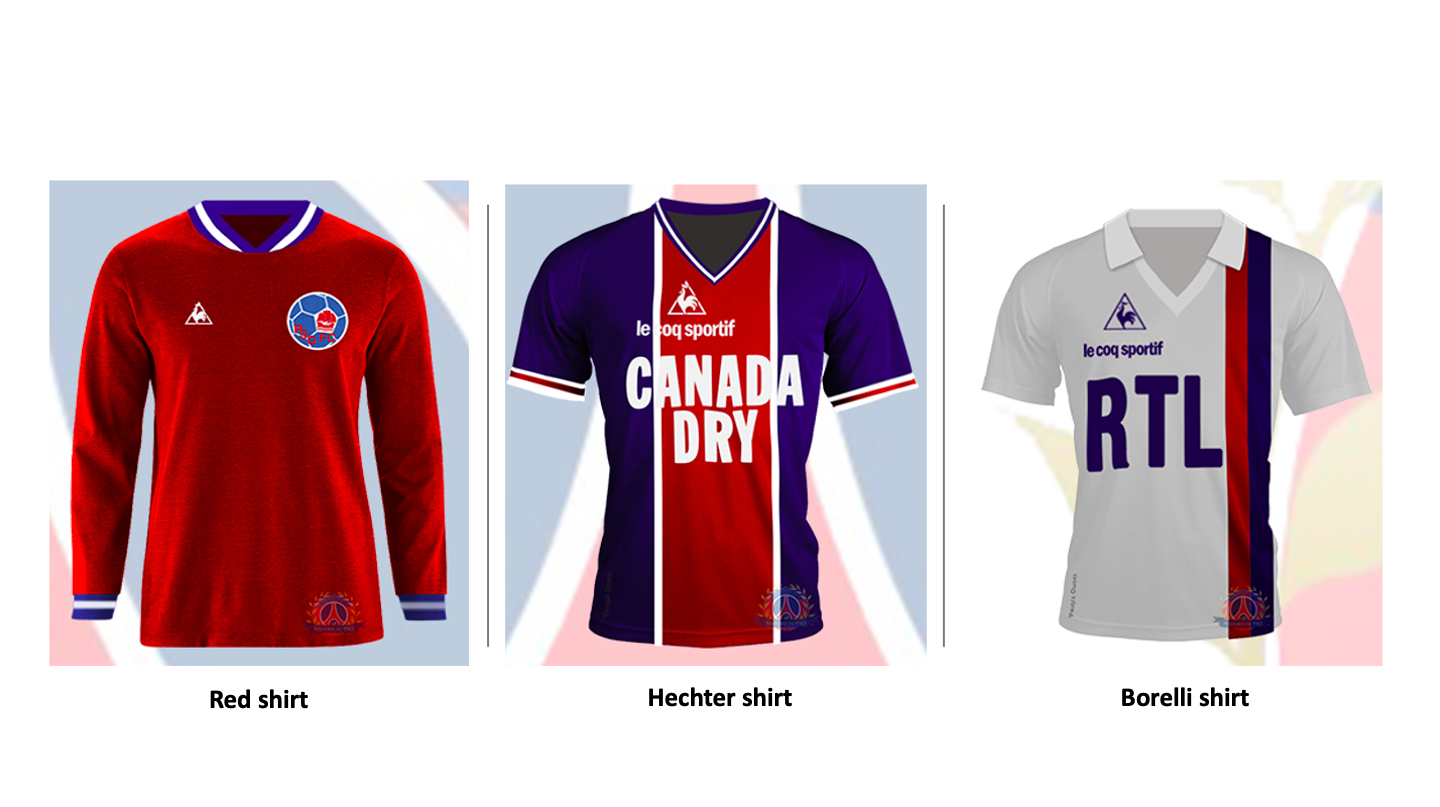
PSG's three most iconic shirts.

First worn in the 1973–74 season, the so-called "Hechter shirt" has remained PSG's classic identity ever since. The famous shirt was debuted against Red Star in November 1973. This was also the club's first match at the Parc des Princes. PSG won 3–1 with Othniel Dossevi scoring the club's first goal in a Hechter shirt. PSG stars from the 1990s and 2000s such as Raí, Ronaldinho and Pauleta are associated with this kit. In it, the club reached five consecutive European semi-finals between 1993 and 1997, lifted the UEFA Cup Winners' Cup in 1996 and achieved eight consecutive victories against arch-rivals Olympique de Marseille between 2002 and 2004.

It is commonly believed that Hechter based his design on the red-and-white jersey worn by Ajax, the dominant European club at the time. Hechter himself denied this, stating that he was inspired by the Ford Mustang, transposing the car's hood stripes onto the jersey and using the club's three colors. The design has two alternate versions: the "Reverse Hechter" (red–white–blue–white–red), introduced in the 1974–75 season, and the "White Hechter" (white–blue–red–blue–white), which debuted in the 1994–95 season.

However, it was in the club's most distinctive away kit that fans saw PSG's first great team, who won their first Coupe de France titles in 1982 and 1983, enjoyed their first European campaign in 1983, and clinched their first Ligue 1 crown in 1986. The shirt was white with blue and red vertical stripes down the left side. Like Hechter's shirt, it debuted in the 1973–74 season as the away kit. Promoted by PSG president Francis Borelli, the white shirt was the club's home identity from 1981 to 1990. Now known as the "Borelli shirt", it is synonymous with 1980s PSG legends such as Safet Sušić, Luis Fernández and Dominique Bathenay.

=== Crest evolution ===
Following the merger of Paris FC (PFC) and Stade Saint-Germain to create Paris Saint-Germain, the club's first crest was the same as the original PFC logo. It featured a blue football and a red sailing ship with its sails billowing in the wind. This ship is a historical symbol of Paris and is present on the city's coat of arms with its motto "Fluctuat nec mergitur" ("[She] is tossed [by the waves], but does not sink"). After separating from PFC in 1972, PSG needed a new crest. Representing both Paris and Saint-Germain-en-Laye, the club's second crest became the basis of the one fans know today, featuring the Eiffel Tower in red against a blue background and, below, two symbols of Saint-Germain in white: a fleur-de-lis and the cradle of Louis XIV. This crest was first used in 1972 and was created by Christian Lentretien, a former PSG director and advertising professional.

In 1982, an image of the club's stadium, the Parc des Princes, was added to the bottom of the crest, remaining there until 1990, when it was removed and the crest reverted to its original form. Two years later, in 1992, the crest was radically modified by the club's owners, Canal+. The new design featured the initials "PSG" in white on a blue, white, red, white, and blue background, mimicking the design of the Hechter shirt, with "Paris Saint-Germain" below, also in white on a black background. Following pressure from the fans, the traditional crest returned in 1995 with "Paris Saint-Germain" above the tower and "1970" below the cradle. In 2002, it underwent a minor modification, primarily the addition of a darker shade of blue.

At the request of the club's Qatari owners, the traditional crest was significantly redesigned in 2013. Now, the word "Paris" is written in large, bold white letters above the Eiffel Tower, clearly emphasizing the "Paris" brand rather than "Paris Saint-Germain". Below, "Saint-Germain" is written in smaller letters beneath the fleur-de-lis. The cradle of Louis XIV and the club's founding year, "1970", have been omitted. PSG deputy general manager Jean-Claude Blanc stated: "We are called Paris Saint-Germain but, above all, we are called Paris".

1970–1972

1972–1982
1990–1992

1982–1990

1992–1996

1996–2002

2002–2013

2013–Present

=== Friendly tournaments ===
Paris Saint-Germain used to host two famous invitational competitions: the Tournoi de Paris and the Tournoi Indoor de Paris-Bercy. Considered the most prestigious friendly tournament in French football, the Tournoi de Paris is regarded as the precursor to both the Intercontinental Cup and the FIFA Club World Cup. PSG began organizing it in 1975 and have been crowned champions a record seven times. Held at the Parc des Princes, the Tournoi de Paris was last organized in 2012. The Tournoi Indoor de Paris-Bercy was an indoor football tournament founded by PSG in 1984 and held annually until 1991 at the Accor Arena. The Parisians have lifted the trophy twice, more than any other club.

== Grounds ==
=== Stadiums ===
The Parc des Princes in October 2022.

Since its inception, Paris Saint-Germain have played in five main stadiums: the Stade Jean-Bouin, the Stade Georges Lefèvre, the Stade Bauer, the Stade Yves-du-Manoir, and the Parc des Princes, their current home ground. PSG took on Ligue 2 promotion rivals Red Star on 10 November 1973, for the club's first match at the Parc des Princes. PSG moved into the ground upon its return to Ligue 1 in July 1974, the same year that rivals Paris FC were relegated. Up until that point it had hosted Paris FC.

From that moment on, the Parc des Princes has been the home stadium of PSG. Its most prolific season in terms of average attendance was 2024–25, during which an average of 47,639 spectators went to the stadium for each match. The attendance record for a PSG match dates back to 13 March 1983, with 49,575 spectators present in the stands of the Parc des Princes. This match pitted PSG against Belgian side Waterschei for the UEFA Cup Winners' Cup quarterfinals. The final score was a 2–0 victory for the Parisians.

The club played at the Stade Jean-Bouin, concurrently with the Stade Georges Lefèvre, in 1970–71, as it attracted significantly higher levels of fan support. The Georges Lefèvre regularly hosted PSG matches from 1972 to 1974 as well. Between 1904 and 1970, it was the home of Stade Saint-Germain, club which merged with Paris FC to form PSG in 1970. PSG played again at the Jean-Bouin in 1973–74, alternating their home games with the Georges Lefèvre and the Parc des Princes. PSG played at the Stade Bauer for the first time in 1971–72. It was used again by the club once in 1976–77 and 1977–78, and twice in 1978–79 due to construction work on the lawn of the Parc des Princes. Similarly, the Stade Yves-du-Manoir welcomed PSG for three matches in 1971–72, once more in 1974–75, and one last time in 1975–76 because the Parc des Princes was under renovation.

=== Training facilities ===
Campus PSG, located in Poissy, has been the club's training ground since 2023. Owned and funded by the club, it houses the men's football team, the women's football team, and the football academy, as well as the handball and judo teams and their academies. Campus PSG will feature a stadium that will complement the club's stadium, the Parc des Princes, which will be built during the second phase of the project, after 2024. PSG's male team moved into Campus PSG on 10 July 2023. They completed their first group training session there on 18 July 2023, and played their first game on 21 July 2023. It was a friendly match against Le Havre which ended in a 2–0 victory for PSG.

Camp des Loges, located in Saint-Germain-en-Laye, was previously the club's training facility from July 1970 until July 2023. Its main stadium, the Stade Georges Lefèvre, served as the home ground for the men's team between 1972 and 1974. Camp des Loges also hosted the training sessions of the club's academy and women's team until 2024. The men's team moved to Campus PSG in July 2023. The academy and women's team followed in January 2024. However, the Camp des Loges remains the headquarters of the Association Paris Saint-Germain, as has been the case since 1970.

== Statistics ==
=== Records ===
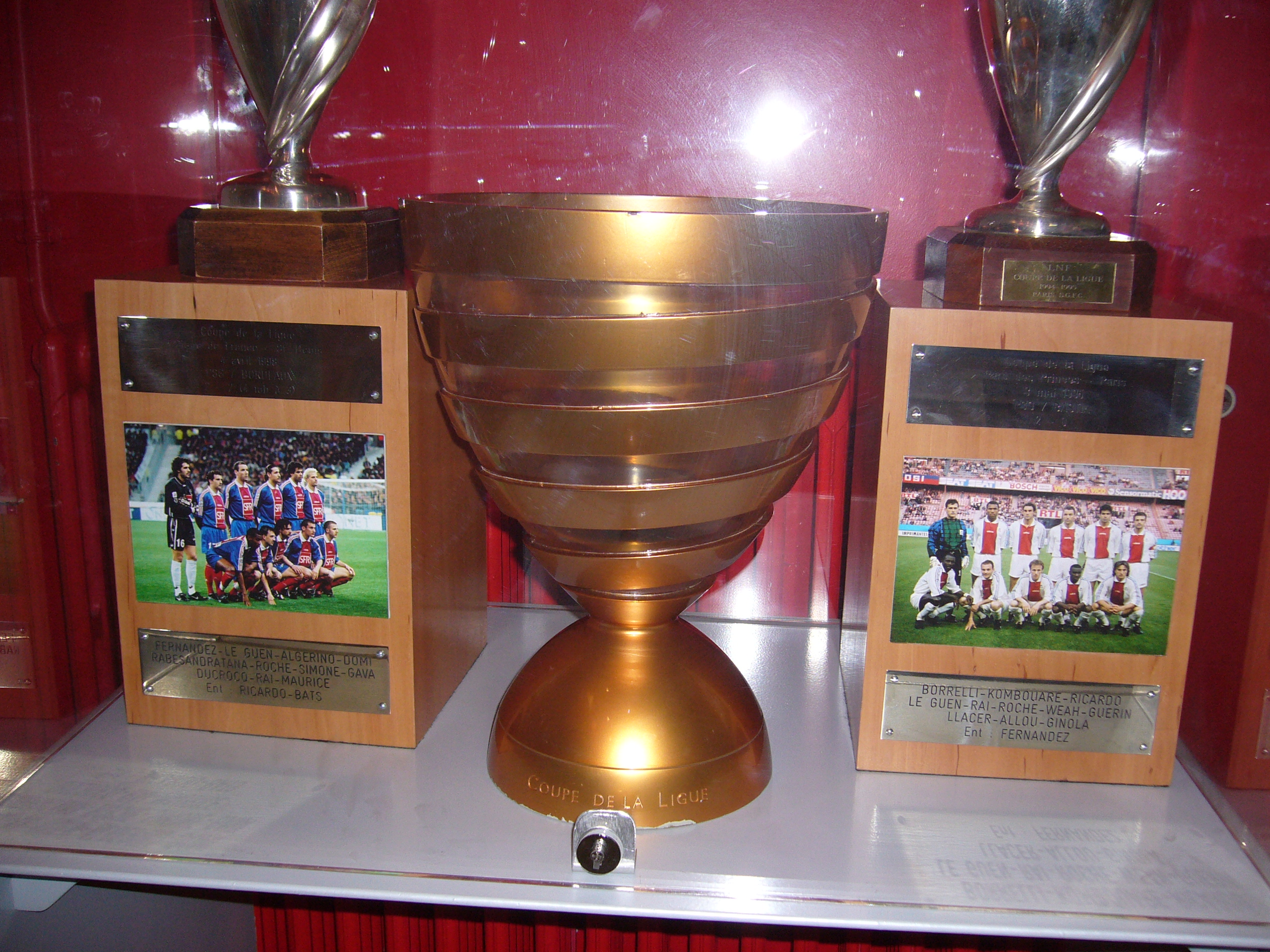
Trophy room in 2008.

Paris Saint-Germain hold numerous records, most notably as the most successful French club in history in terms of major official titles, with 60. They hold the record in all domestic competitions, having won 14 Ligue 1 titles, 16 Coupe de France, nine Coupe de la Ligue, and 14 Trophée des Champions. Internationally, PSG have won two UEFA Champions League titles, two UEFA Super Cup, one UEFA Cup Winners' Cup, one UEFA Intertoto Cup, and one FIFA Intercontinental Cup. Their honours also include one Ligue 2 title, bringing their total number of official titles to 61. They have also secured several unofficial titles, including a record seven Tournoi de Paris, a record two Tournoi Indoor de Paris-Bercy, and two International Champions Cup trophies.

PSG's victory in the 1995–96 UEFA Cup Winners' Cup made them the only French club to win that competition and one of only two French teams to have claimed a major European trophy. By winning the 2024–25 UEFA Champions League, together with the 2024–25 Ligue 1 and the 2024–25 Coupe de France, the club became the first French side to achieve a continental treble. Subsequent victories in the 2025 UEFA Super Cup and the 2025 FIFA Intercontinental Cup made PSG the first French club to win both trophies and delivered the first club world title in the history of French football. Having also won the 2024 Trophée des Champions, PSG completed an unprecedented sextuple, a feat previously achieved only by Barcelona in 2009 and Bayern Munich in 2020.

The Parisians hold the record for the most consecutive seasons in the French top flight, with 52 seasons in Ligue 1 since 1974–75. They are also the only club to have won the Ligue 1 title while leading the table from the first to the final matchday (2022–23), the Coupe de France without conceding a goal (1992–93 and 2016–17), five consecutive Coupe de la Ligue titles (2014–2018), four successive Coupe de France trophies (2015–2018), and eight consecutive Trophée des Champions titles (2013–2020).

Influential figures in the history of PSG include the club's most decorated president Nasser Al-Khelaifi, the most decorated manager Luis Enrique, record appearance holder Marquinhos, all-time top scorer Kylian Mbappé, assist leader Ángel Di María, clean-sheet record holder Bernard Lama, longest-serving captain Thiago Silva. Other notable players include Ballon d'Or winners Lionel Messi and Ousmane Dembélé, as well as world-record transfer signing Neymar.

=== Seasons ===
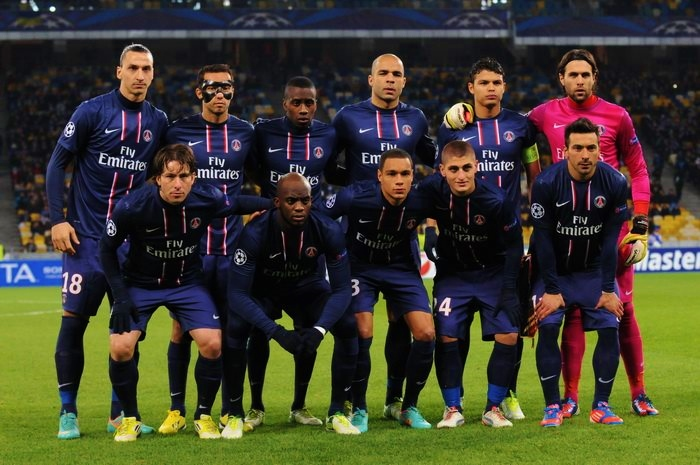
Starting eleven during the 2012–13 season.

Paris Saint-Germain have played 56 seasons, of which 53 have been played in the top division of French football, the Ligue 1. In the remaining three seasons, the club have played twice in the second division, the Ligue 2, and once in the third division, the Division 3. In the 2025–26 season, PSG celebrated their 52nd consecutive Ligue 1 campaign, making them the longest-serving club in the competition. The club played its first competitive match on 23 August 1970, drawing 1–1 away to Poitiers in the opening matchday of Ligue 2. PSG won the Ligue 2 title at the end of the campaign, earning promotion to the top flight. The Parisians made their Ligue 1 debut on 11 August 1971, in a 2–0 away defeat to Angers. Their momentum soon came to a halt and the club split in June 1972, with Paris FC remaining in Ligue 1 and PSG being administratively relegated to Division 3.

After two consecutive promotions, PSG returned to Ligue 1 in the 1974–75 season and never looked back. Since then, the club have won a record thirteen league titles, finishing first more often than in any other position. Having finished second in nine league campaigns, PSG have regained the top two places on 22 occasions. They have also reached the top five 30 times, representing more than half of the club's seasons in Ligue 1. PSG's lowest ever finish is 16th, achieved in both the 1971–72 and the 2007–08 seasons, when they escaped relegation on the final day with a 2–1 win at Sochaux.

PSG enjoyed their best season to date in the 2024–25 campaign, winning the continental treble by lifting the UEFA Champions League title, the league championship and the Coupe de France. They played a record 65 matches, winning 48 of them, and averaged a record attendance of 47,639 per home league game. The club also set several records during the 2015–16 season: PSG collected 96 points, their highest total in Ligue 1, while conceding just 19 goals, and Zlatan Ibrahimović became the player with the most goals scored in a single season, scoring 50. Other notable records across all competitions include the 28 goals conceded in the 1993–94 season and the 171 goals scored in the 2017–18 season.

== International football ==
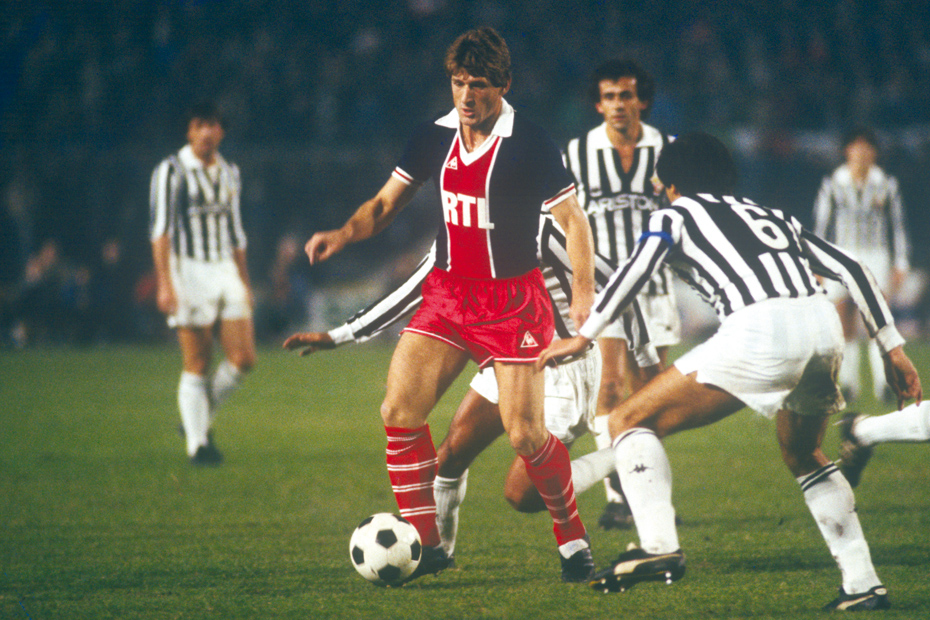
PSG legend Safet Sušić in 1983.

Paris Saint-Germain are the most successful French club in international competitions. They have won six European titles (the UEFA Cup Winners' Cup in 1996, the UEFA Intertoto Cup in 2001, the UEFA Champions League in 2025 and 2026, and the UEFA Super Cup in 2025 and 2026) as well as the 2025 FIFA Intercontinental Cup. PSG are also the only French side to have won the UEFA Cup Winners' Cup and the first to win the continental treble and the Super Cup. They were runners-up in the 1996 UEFA Super Cup, the 1996–97 UEFA Cup Winners' Cup, the 2019–20 UEFA Champions League, and the 2025 FIFA Club World Cup.

The Parisians made their international debut in the 1982–83 season, qualifying for the now-defunct Cup Winners' Cup as Coupe de France winners. Their first match was against Lokomotiv Sofia and reached the quarter-finals, where they were eliminated by Waterschei Thor. PSG subsequently competed in the UEFA Europa League in the 1984–85 campaign, before taking their first steps in Europe's premier club competition, the Champions League, in the 1986–87 season.

Between 1992 and 1997, the club reached five consecutive semi-finals: three in the Cup Winners' Cup, one in the Champions League, and one in the Europa League. They won their first European trophy by defeating Rapid Wien in the 1996 UEFA Cup Winners' Cup final. This victory allowed PSG to compete in the UEFA Super Cup, where they lost to Juventus. They reached a second consecutive Cup Winners' Cup final in 1997, this time losing to Barcelona. PSG played in the now-defunct Intertoto Cup once. They did so in 2001, winning their second continental trophy against Brescia on away goals in the two-legged final.

PSG reached their first UEFA Champions League final in 2020, where they were defeated by Bayern Munich, marking their first European final appearance since 2001. The club went on to win their first Champions League title in 2025, defeating Inter Milan in the final. As reigning European champions, Paris competed in the FIFA Club World Cup, the UEFA Super Cup and the FIFA Intercontinental Cup. They finished runners-up in the Club World Cup, losing the final to Chelsea, but secured victories in both the Super Cup, defeating Tottenham Hotspur on penalties, and the Intercontinental Cup, also winning on penalties against Flamengo. PSG won a second consecutive Champions League title in 2026, defeating Arsenal in the final on penalties.

== Supporters ==
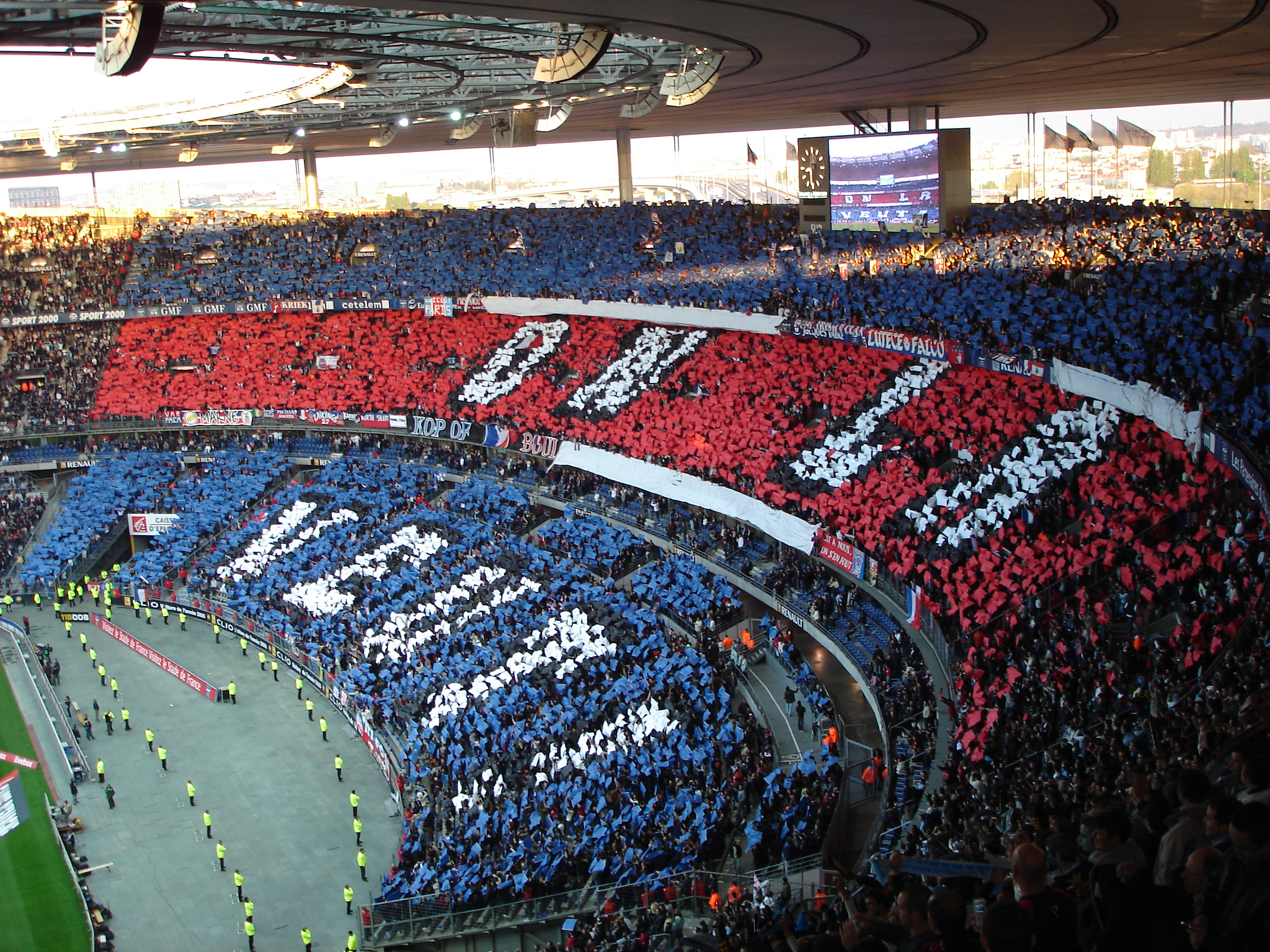
PSG fans at the 2006 French Cup final.

Paris Saint-Germain are the most popular football club in France and one of the most widely followed teams in the world. Its home ground, the Parc des Princes, has hosted the team since July 1974. The stadium is divided into four main stands: Tribune Auteuil, Tribune Paris, Tribune Borelli, and Tribune Boulogne. Historically, the Auteuil and Boulogne stands—better known as the Virage Auteuil (VA) and the Kop of Boulogne (KoB)—have been the strongholds of PSG's ultras, making the Parc one of the most intimidating venues in Europe and renowned for its electric atmosphere. Meanwhile, more family-friendly and welcoming fan groups typically gather in the Paris and Borelli stands, including the club's first supporters' group, Les Amis du PSG, which was founded in 1975.

Lacking a large and passionate following in its early years, the club began offering cheaper season tickets to young fans in 1976. These supporters were placed in Kop K, located in the Blue K Section of the Paris stand at the Parc des Princes. After ticket prices increased, the Kop K fans moved to the Boulogne stand in 1978, giving rise to the Kop of Boulogne. The club's first Italian-style ultra group, the Boulogne Boys, was founded there in 1985, followed by the English-inspired kopistes Gavroches and Rangers. However, some KoB groups, including Commando Pirate and Casual Firm, took English hooligans as questionable role models, and violence escalated rapidly.

In response, the club's owners, Canal+, encouraged non-violent KoB fans to gather at the opposite end of the stadium, leading to the creation of the Virage Auteuil in 1991. This section was spearheaded by the ultra groups Supras Auteuil, Lutece Falco, and Tigris Mystic. The initiative initially succeeded, but a violent, racially charged rivalry gradually developed between the two stands. Tensions peaked in 2010, before a match against Olympique de Marseille, when Boulogne fan Yann Lorence was killed following a brawl outside the Parc between supporters from both stands. This tragedy prompted PSG president Robin Leproux to implement the Plan Leproux, which exiled all supporter groups from the Parc and banned them from away matches. After former VA supporters formed the Collectif Ultras Paris (CUP) in May 2016, the club allowed their return in October of the same year.

Based in Auteuil, the CUP are currently the only ultra group officially recognized by the club. PSG allowed the CUP to take over the Boulogne stand starting in the 2025–26 season. They share the stadium with other licensed groups: Hoolicool, Vikings 27, and Handicap PSG in the Paris stand; and Les Amis du PSG, Titi Fosi, and PSG Grand Sud in the Borelli stand. In the past, PSG also recognized Supras Auteuil, Lutece Falco, and Tigris Mystic from Auteuil; Boulogne Boys, Gavroches, and Rangers from Boulogne; and Authentiks, Puissance Paris, and Brigade Paris from Paris. The hooligan firm Karsud remains active but has been banned from all PSG matches since 2017.

== Rivalries ==
=== Le Classique ===
Le Classique, also referred to as Le Classico, Le Clasico, or Le Derby de France, is a French football rivalry contested between PSG and Olympique de Marseille (OM). It is widely regarded as the biggest rivalry in French football and one of the most notable fixtures in world football, involving the two most successful clubs in France and the only French teams to have won major European trophies. The match is often compared to Spain's El Clásico and attracts significant attention in domestic and international football circles.

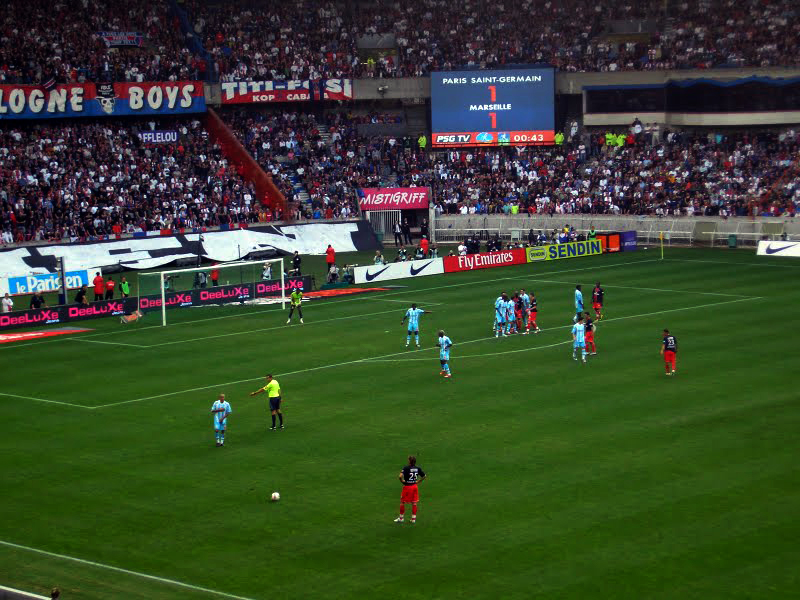
PSG/OM at the Parc des Princes in 2007.

PSG and OM dominated French football before Olympique Lyonnais disrupted their domestic supremacy in the early 2000s and remain the most followed French clubs internationally. Both clubs consistently rank among the highest in French attendances. Early clashes in the 1970s gave little indication of a major rivalry: PSG, a newly formed club, was still building competitiveness, while OM were established Ligue 1 contenders. The rivalry began in earnest in the 1980s, particularly after PSG won their first league title in 1986 and Marseille was acquired by businessman Bernard Tapie. By the end of the decade, the two clubs were competing closely for the Ligue 1 title, with tensions heightened by accusations of match-fixing and other controversies.

In the 1990s, the rivalry intensified. French media company Canal+ purchased PSG in 1991, partly to challenge Marseille's dominance, while media coverage helped promote the animosity between the clubs. With financial backing and growing media attention, PSG and OM became the main contenders for national honours. Although both teams were less successful in the 2000s, the rivalry remained strong. In the 2010s, PSG's significant investment from Qatar Sports Investments (QSI) allowed the club to dominate domestically, further intensifying the rivalry. Matches regularly draw large crowds, high television audiences, and require heightened security due to passionate fan support.

The rivalry has a female equivalent, featuring Paris Saint-Germain FC (women) and OL Lyonnes (Lyon). Matches between the two sides are referred to as the women's Le Classique. By the end of the 2000s, French women's football was dominated by Lyon, which won a record number of Première Ligue and UEFA Women's Champions League titles. PSG first faced Lyon in 1994, but it was not until the club's acquisition by QSI in 2012 that the two sides emerged as genuine rivals, consistently competing for league honours.

=== Paris derby ===
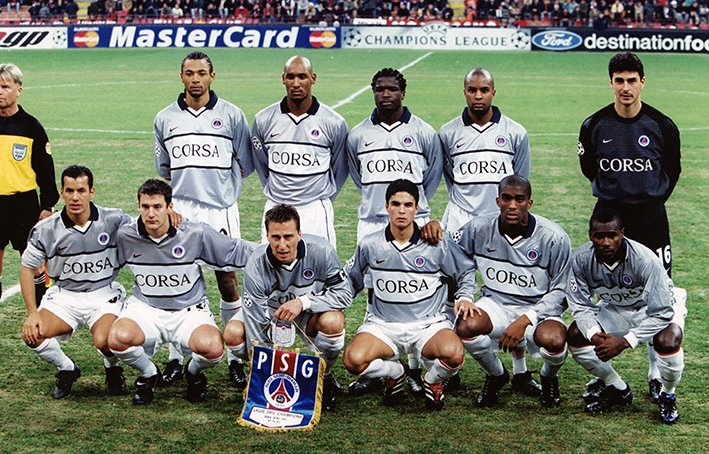
PSG, the dominant club in Paris, in 2001.

The Paris derby, also referred to as Derby de Paris, Derby de la Capitale, or Le Derby Parisien, is a French football rivalry contested between PSG and Paris FC (PFC), the two largest professional clubs based in Paris, France. The rivalry has roots in the history of football in Paris, where established clubs such as Racing Club de France Football and Red Star FC once competed for prominence.

PSG was founded in 1970 through the merger of Paris FC and Stade Saint-Germain, following an initiative to establish a major football club in the capital. After the two clubs split in 1972, PSG established itself as Paris's leading club, regularly competing in Ligue 1 and European competitions. Paris FC spent decades outside the top flight before returning to Ligue 1 in 2025.

Following Paris FC's promotion, the derby returned to the top flight. PSG's Parc des Princes and Paris FC's Stade Jean-Bouin are located close to one another in Paris's 16th arrondissement, making the fixture one of the geographically closest derbies in football. The first top-flight meeting between the clubs since 1990 took place at the Parc des Princes on 4 January 2026, with PSG winning 2–1. Paris FC later defeated PSG 1–0 in the Coupe de France, handing their rivals a home defeat in the competition.

The rivalry also extends to women's football, with Paris Saint-Germain FC (women) and Paris FC (women) competing at the highest level. Paris FC, formerly known as Juvisy, was a prominent force in French women's football during the 1990s and 2000s, while PSG emerged as a leading club during the 2010s. Paris FC subsequently established itself as another contender in the league, highlighted by its victory over PSG in the 2025 Coupe de France Féminine final.

== Ownership and finances ==
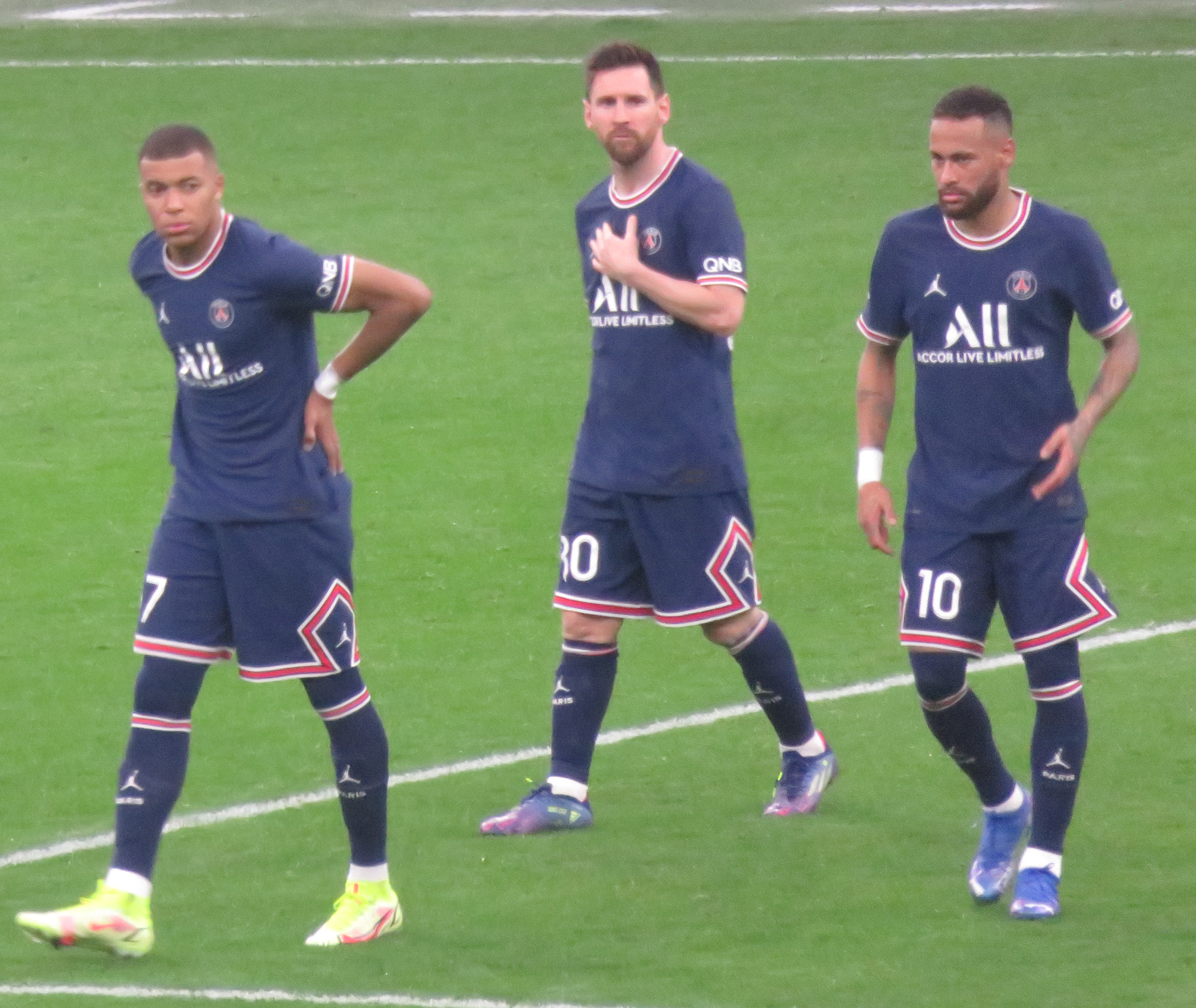
PSG's Kylian Mbappé, Lionel Messi and Neymar in 2021.

Paris Saint-Germain were initially fan-owned, with around 20,000 members under a non-profit association governed by French law (Association PSG). The club was led by board members Guy Crescent, Pierre-Étienne Guyot and Henri Patrelle. In 1973, a group of French businessmen led by Daniel Hechter and Francis Borelli took control of the club. PSG changed ownership in 1991 when Canal+ created a professional sports company (SASP) structure, followed by another takeover in 2006 by Colony Capital. Since 2011, Qatar Sports Investments (QSI) have been the majority owners, currently holding 85.9% of shares, with Arctos Partners (12.5%) and Boardroom (1.6%) holding the remainder.

Backed by the Qatari state, QSI acquired a controlling stake in 2011 and became sole owner in 2012. Since then, PSG have been widely described as a state-backed club and among the wealthiest in world football. QSI chairman Nasser Al-Khelaifi has served as PSG president since the takeover. However, the Emir of Qatar, Tamim bin Hamad Al Thani, as head of the Qatar Investment Authority (QIA) and founder of QSI, is widely regarded as the ultimate decision-maker on major strategic matters. Upon arrival, QSI pledged to build a squad capable of winning the UEFA Champions League. Since 2011, PSG have invested heavily in transfer fees and wages. This spending has led to domestic dominance and two consecutive Champions League titles, but also scrutiny under UEFA Financial Fair Play Regulations.

As of May 2026, PSG ranked fourth globally in football revenue with €837 million according to Deloitte, and were valued at around €5 billion by Forbes, making them the fifth-most valuable club in the world. This growth has been driven by sustained investment, sporting success, global branding, and commercial partnerships. Deloitte also ranked PSG's women's team among the top revenue-generating sides in world women's football, while the club's handball section operates with one of the largest budgets in European handball.

== Honours ==
As of 2026 UEFA Super Cup.

Type	Competitions	Titles	Seasons
Domestic	Ligue 1	14	1985–86, 1993–94, 2012–13, 2013–14, 2014–15, 2015–16, 2017–18, 2018–19, 2019–20, 2021–22, 2022–23, 2023–24, 2024–25, 2025–26
Domestic	Ligue 2	1	1970–71
Domestic	Coupe de France	16	1981–82, 1982–83, 1992–93, 1994–95, 1997–98, 2003–04, 2005–06, 2009–10, 2014–15, 2015–16, 2016–17, 2017–18, 2019–20, 2020–21, 2023–24, 2024–25
Domestic	Trophée des Champions	14	1995, 1998, 2013, 2014, 2015, 2016, 2017, 2018, 2019, 2020, 2022, 2023, 2024, 2025
Domestic	Coupe de la Ligue	9	1994–95, 1997–98, 2007–08, 2013–14, 2014–15, 2015–16, 2016–17, 2017–18, 2019–20
Continental	UEFA Champions League	2	2024–25, 2025–26
Continental	UEFA Cup Winners' Cup	1	1995–96
Continental	UEFA Super Cup	2	2025, 2026
Continental	UEFA Intertoto Cup	1	2001
Worldwide	FIFA Intercontinental Cup	1^{s}	2025

- record
- ^{s} shared record

== Players ==
=== Current squad ===
As of 1 September 2026.

Note: Flags indicate national team as defined under FIFA eligibility rules; some limited exceptions apply. Players may hold more than one non-FIFA nationality.

No.	Pos.	Nation	Player
2	DF	MAR	Achraf Hakimi (vice-captain)
4	DF	BRA	Lucas Beraldo
5	DF	BRA	Marquinhos (captain)
6	DF	UKR	Illia Zabarnyi
7	FW	GEO	Khvicha Kvaratskhelia
8	MF	ESP	Fabián Ruiz
9	FW	ESP	Ferran Torres
10	FW	FRA	Ousmane Dembélé (4th captain)
11	MF	FRA	Maghnes Akliouche
12	DF	FRA	Lucas Digne
14	FW	FRA	Désiré Doué
16	GK	ITA	Alessandro Longoni

No.	Pos.	Nation	Player
17	MF	POR	Vitinha (3rd captain)
21	DF	FRA	Lucas Hernandez
22	FW	BEL	Mika Godts
24	MF	FRA	Senny Mayulu
25	DF	POR	Nuno Mendes
27	MF	ESP	Dro Fernández
30	GK	FRA	Lucas Chevalier
33	MF	FRA	Warren Zaïre-Emery
39	GK	RUS	Matvey Safonov
47	FW	FRA	Quentin Ndjantou
51	DF	ECU	Willian Pacho
87	MF	POR	João Neves

=== Out on loan ===
Note: Flags indicate national team as defined under FIFA eligibility rules; some limited exceptions apply. Players may hold more than one non-FIFA nationality.

No.	Pos.	Nation	Player
—	GK	ITA	Renato Marin (at CD Nacional until 30 June 2027)
—	DF	MAR	Naoufel El Hannach (at Montpellier until 30 June 2027)
—	DF	FRA	Yoram Zague (at Pafos until 30 June 2027)

No.	Pos.	Nation	Player
—	MF	BRA	Gabriel Moscardo (at Espanyol until 30 June 2027)
—	FW	TUN	Khalil Ayari (at Dunkerque until 30 June 2027)

== Personnel ==
=== Management ===
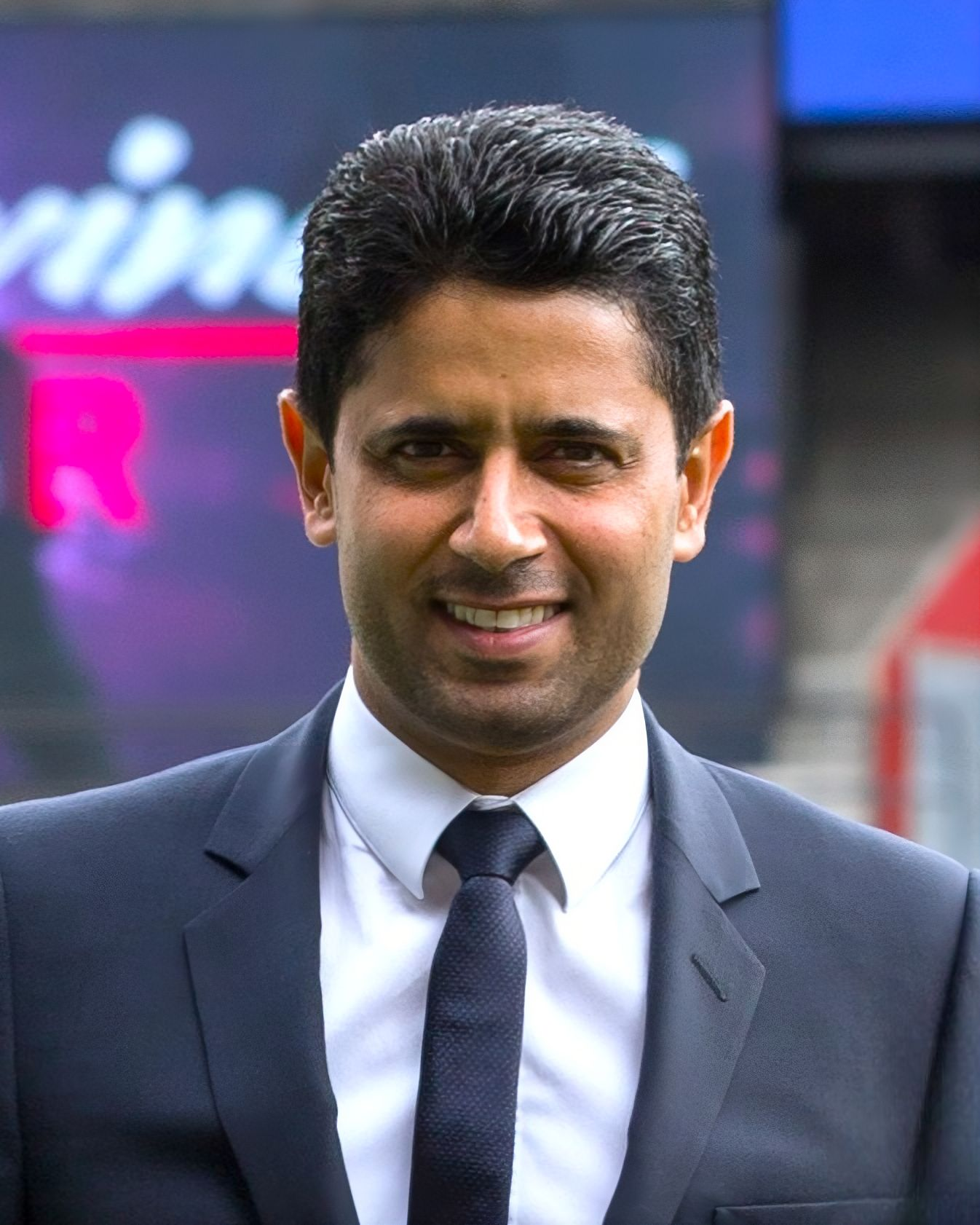
Nasser Al-Khelaifi

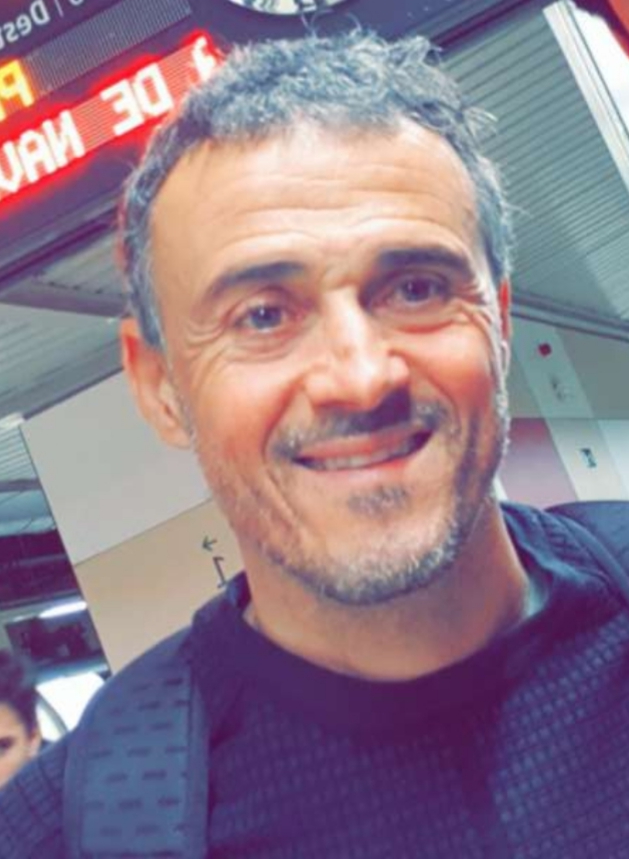
Luis Enrique

Position	Name	Source
President	(Qatar) Nasser Al-Khelaifi	
Chief Executive Officer	(France) Victoriano Melero	
Chief Communications Officer	(France) Anne Descamps	
Chief Revenue Officer	(England) Richard Heaselgrave	
Chief Brand Officer	(France) Fabien Allègre	
Football Advisor	(Portugal) Luís Campos	

=== Technical staff ===
Position	Name	Source
First-team head coach	(Spain) Luis Enrique	
Assistant coach	(Spain) Rafel Pol	
Assistant coach	(Spain) Guillem Hernández	
Psychologist	(Spain) Joaquín Valdés	
Fitness coach	(Spain) Pedro Gómez	
Assistant fitness coach	(Spain) Alberto Piernas	
Goalkeeper coach	(Spain) Borja Álvarez	
Assistant goalkeeper coach	(France) Nicolas Cousin	

== Other teams ==
=== Women's football ===
Paris Saint-Germain FC (women) are a French professional women's football club based in Paris, France. It operates as the women's football department of Paris Saint-Germain FC. Founded in 1971, the club competes in the Première Ligue, the top tier of women's football in France. PSG spent its early decades moving between divisions before establishing itself in the top flight in 2001. Following the takeover by Qatar Sports Investments (QSI) in 2012, the women's team received increased investment, leading to the professionalization of the squad and its emergence as one of the leading clubs in French women's football. The club subsequently established itself as a regular contender for domestic honours and in European competition.

=== Youth football academy ===
The Paris Saint-Germain FC Youth Academy is the youth system for the men's and women's football teams of Paris Saint-Germain. Managed by the Association Paris Saint-Germain, the men's section of the academy was founded in 1970, with its first center opening in 1975. PSG began developing young players for the women's section in 2012, and the first women's center of the academy was inaugurated in 2023.

Male players progress through the U17, U19, and Espoirs categories before reaching the first team, while the U19 is the final step for female players. Since its creation, the academy has produced players such as Jean-Marc Pilorget, Nicolas Anelka, Mamadou Sakho, Kingsley Coman, Adrien Rabiot, Alphonse Areola, Presnel Kimpembe, Marie-Antoinette Katoto, Grace Geyoro, Perle Morroni and Sandy Baltimore. Many other graduates have also signed professional contracts with PSG or other clubs.

== Other sports ==
=== Handball ===
Paris Saint-Germain Handball is a French professional handball club based in Paris, France. It operates as the handball department of Paris Saint-Germain FC. Founded in 1941, the club currently competes in the top tier of French handball, the LNH Division 1. Originally established as Patriotes d'Asnières, the club underwent several name changes and relocations before becoming part of Paris Saint-Germain ahead of the 1992–93 season. Following a period of decline and separation from PSG in 2002, the club was rebranded as Paris Handball and later entered a new era after being acquired by Qatar Sports Investments (QSI) in 2012, adopting its current name.

The club's history has been marked by steady development and several pivotal turning points. After experiencing both successes and setbacks in the mid-20th century, PSG Handball rose to prominence during the 1990s under the PSG banner. However, the early 2000s saw the club suffer relegation and financial difficulties. The post-2002 period involved a gradual rebuilding process, with Paris Handball stabilising independently and achieving consistent domestic performances, laying the foundations for its resurgence prior to the QSI takeover. Since 2012, PSG Handball have established themselves as the dominant force in French handball.

=== Esports ===
Paris Saint-Germain Esports is a French professional esports club based in Paris, France. It operates as the esports department of Paris Saint-Germain FC. The organisation currently fields teams in EA Sports FC. It has previously competed in League of Legends, Rocket League, Dota 2, FIFA Online, Brawl Stars, Mobile Legends: Bang Bang, Arena of Valor, Fortnite Battle Royale, and Tom Clancy's Rainbow Six Siege.

Founded in 2016, PSG Esports entered competitive esports through League of Legends and EA Sports FC before expanding into multiple titles. The organisation has competed across a variety of esports scenes, establishing partnerships with teams including LGD Gaming, Talon Esports, Team Vitality, Team New Age, and Tundra Esports. Across all divisions, PSG Esports has won several titles, including championships in Dota 2, League of Legends, EA Sports FC, Brawl Stars, Rocket League, and Rainbow Six Siege.

=== Judo ===
Paris Saint-Germain Judo is a French professional judo club based in Paris, France. It operates as the judo department of Paris Saint-Germain FC. Founded in September 1992 at the initiative of former judoka Thierry Rey and with financial support from Canal+, owner of PSG, the judo section was the club's first to win a continental trophy. Led by star judokas David Douillet, Cécile Nowak, Djamel Bouras and Frédéric Demontfaucon, the Parisians clinched the Champions League in 1995 and the French 1st Division Championship in 1997. However, PSG judo experienced a sharp decline thereafter, leading Canal+ to withdraw in 2002, before PSG closed the section in June 2003.

Conceived by Bouras, who was part of the original iteration of the section, PSG Judo was officially reestablished on 1 September 2017. Paris Saint-Germain president Nasser Al-Khelaifi announced the project in a press release. He also confirmed the signing of French judoka Teddy Riner as the team's leading figure, while Bouras was appointed president. Initially an all-male project, PSG Judo eventually evolved into a mixed-gender team. Since their return, the PSG men's and women's teams have enjoyed domestic and European success.

=== Basketball ===
Paris Saint-Germain Basketball was a French professional basketball club based in Paris, France. It operated as the basketball department of Paris Saint-Germain FC. Founded in 1992, following the takeover of Racing Paris Basket by PSG and its owners Canal+, the club competed in the LNB Élite, the top tier of French basketball. Despite an ambitious recruitment drive, PSG-Racing experienced early difficulties before establishing itself as a competitive force in French basketball during the mid-1990s.

The club reached its peak during the 1996–97 season, when it won the French championship, securing the only LNB Élite title in its history. By the late 1990s, financial uncertainty, particularly following Canal+'s decision to reduce its involvement, combined with injuries and squad instability, led to the dissolution of PSG-Racing in May 2000. Its place in French basketball was subsequently taken by Paris Basket Racing, bringing an end to an eight-year chapter of PSG's involvement in professional basketball.

=== Volleyball ===
Paris Saint-Germain Volleyball was a French professional volleyball club based in Paris, France. It operated as the volleyball department of Paris Saint-Germain FC. It was founded as PSG-Asnières Volley in 1992, following the takeover of Asnières Sports, based in the Paris suburb of Asnières-sur-Seine, by PSG and its owners Canal+. The club competed in the top tier of French volleyball, the LNV Ligue A Masculine.

In its inaugural 1992–93 season, PSG-Asnières won the French championship. The team remained competitive in subsequent seasons and came close to a domestic double in 1993–94, winning the Coupe de France and finishing runners-up in the league. Ahead of the 1995–96 season, PSG withdrew from its partnership with Asnières and merged its top-flight licence with Racing Club de France, creating PSG-Racing Volley. Despite occasional strong performances and playoff appearances, PSG-Racing failed to replicate its early success.

The club's future was ultimately decided off the court. In 1998, discussions between officials from PSG and Paris Université Club (PUC) intensified, with the aim of consolidating elite volleyball in the capital by creating a single, stable, and internationally competitive Parisian club. Despite initial administrative and financial obstacles, a protocol agreement was signed in July 1998, leading to the formation of Paris Volley.

=== Boxing ===
Paris Saint-Germain Boxing was a French professional boxing club based in Paris, France. It operated as the boxing department of Paris Saint-Germain FC. The section was established in 1992 on the initiative of former French professional boxer Jean-Claude Bouttier and trained at a dedicated boxing gym located within the Parc des Princes. Throughout its existence, the club was led by president Bouttier, along with managers René Acquaviva and Gilbert Delé, and featured a roster of prominent French boxers.

During its five years of competition, PSG Boxing achieved notable success, winning four French championships, three European titles, and one world championship. Among its principal achievements were Patrice Aouissi's French and European cruiserweight titles, Julien Lorcy and Djamel Lifa's European championships, and Khalid Rahilou's WBA light welterweight world title. The section entered its final phase following the departure of head coach René Acquaviva in mid-1997. With limited support from the French Boxing Federation, PSG Boxing was disbanded later that year, and the boxing gym at the Parc des Princes was closed.

=== Rugby League ===
Paris Saint-Germain Rugby League was a French professional rugby league club based in Paris, France. It operated as the rugby league department of Paris Saint-Germain FC. Founded in 1995, the club was established as part of an expansion project for the Super League, the top division of the British rugby league system. Created under president Jacques Fouroux with the support of French media giants Canal+ and Australian media conglomerate News Corp Australia, PSG RL became the first French team to participate in the competition.

In its inaugural 1996 season, PSG RL contested the first match in Super League history, defeating the Sheffield Eagles 30–24 in front of nearly 18,000 spectators, the largest rugby league crowd in France in several decades. Despite a promising start, the club's form declined, and it finished 11th of 12 teams with three wins and one draw. In the 1997 season, PSG RL recorded several notable results, including a 30–28 home victory over Wigan Warriors, and competed in the 1997 Challenge Cup, the 1997 World Club Championship, and the 1997 Rugby League Premiership before again finishing 11th in the league standings. The club ceased operations later in 1997 following financial difficulties, declining attendances, and administrative issues.
