= Football records and statistics in France =

This page details football records and statistics in France.

== League ==
As of 13 May 2026

=== Titles ===
- Most top-flight League titles: 14, Paris Saint-Germain
- Most consecutive League titles: 7, Lyon

=== Top-flight appearances ===
- Most appearances: 76 seasons, Marseille
- Most consecutive seasons in top-flight: 52 seasons, Paris Saint-Germain (1974–2026)

=== Wins ===
- Most wins in the top-flight overall: 992, Marseille
- Most wins in a top flight season: 30, Paris Saint-Germain (2015–16), Monaco (2016–17)
- Most home wins in a top flight season: 19, Saint-Étienne (1974–75)
- Most away wins in a top flight season: 13, Monaco (2016–17)
- Most consecutive wins: 14, Bordeaux (round 28 2008–09 to round 3 2009–10)
- Most consecutive home wins: 28, Saint-Étienne (round 28 1973–74 to round 4 1975–76)
- Most consecutive away wins: 9, Marseille (round 24 2008–09 to round 1 2009–10)
- Most consecutive wins in a single top flight season: 12, Monaco (round 27 2016–17 to round 38 2016–17)

=== Draws ===
- Most draws in the top-flight overall: 622, Sochaux

=== Losses ===
- Most losses in the top-flight overall: 859, Sochaux
- Fewest losses in a top flight season: 1, Nantes (1994–95)
- Fewest home losses in a top flight season: 0, joint record :
  - Nantes, 7 seasons
  - Marseille, Bordeaux, 5 seasons
  - Saint-Étienne, Monaco, 4 seasons
  - Sète, Strasbourg, Auxerre, 3 seasons
  - Nîmes, Bastia, Lens, Paris Saint-Germain, Lyon, 2 seasons
  - Olympique Lillois, RC Paris, Valenciennes, Angers, Nice, Nancy, Laval, Toulouse, Cannes, 1 season
- Fewest away losses in a top flight season: 1, Nantes (1994–95)

=== Points ===
- Most points in the top-flight overall:
  - 2 points for a win: 2551, Marseille
  - 3 points for a win: 3543, Marseille
- Fewest points in a top flight season:
  - 3 points for a win: 17, Lens (1988–89)

=== Goals ===
- Most goals scored in the top-flight overall: 3611, Marseille
- Most goals conceded in the top-flight overall: 3236, FC Sochaux
- Highest goal difference in the top-flight overall: +847, Monaco
- Most goals scored in a top flight season: 118, Racing CF (1959–60)
- Fewest goals conceded in a top flight season: 19, Paris Saint-Germain (2015–16)
- Highest goal difference in a top flight season: +83, Paris Saint-Germain (2015–16)

=== Attendances ===
- Record attendance: 78,056 Lille v Lyon played at Stade de France (7 March 2009).

== Total titles won (1918–present) ==
=== Key ===
French domestic competitions organised by the FFF
L1	Ligue 1
CdF	Coupe de France
CdL	Coupe de la Ligue (defunct)
TdC	Trophée des Champions
CdC	Challenge des Champions (defunct)
CcD	Coupe Charles Drago (defunct)
European continental competitions organised by UEFA
UCL	UEFA Champions League, former European Champion Clubs' Cup
UCWC	UEFA Cup Winners' Cup (defunct)
UEL	UEFA Europa League, formerly UEFA Cup
USC	UEFA Super Cup
UIC	UEFA Intertoto Cup (defunct)
Intercontinental competitions organised by FIFA, and by UEFA and CONMEBOL
IC	Intercontinental Cup (defunct)
FCWC	FIFA Club World Cup
FIC	FIFA Intercontinental Cup

=== Performance by club ===
(Sorted by overall titles. Use sorting button to change criteria.)

As of 12 August 2026

Domestic titles								European titles						Worldwide titles			All titles
Team	L1	CdF	CdL	TdC	CdC	CcD	Total	UCL	UCWC	UEL	USC	UIC	Total	IC	FCWC	FIC	Total
Paris Saint-Germain	**14**	**16**	**9**	**14**	–	–	**53**	**2**	**1**	–	**2**	1	**6**	–	–	**1**	**60**
Marseille	9	10	3	2	1	1	26	1	–	–	–	1	2	–	–	–	28
Saint-Étienne	10	6	1	–	**5**	2	24	–	–	–	–	–	–	–	–	–	24
Lyon	7	5	1	7	1	–	21	–	–	–	–	1	1	–	–	–	22
Monaco	8	5	1	2	2	1	19	–	–	–	–	–	–	–	–	–	19
Bordeaux	6	4	3	2	1	–	16	–	–	–	–	1	1	–	–	–	17
Nantes	8	4	1	2	1	–	16	–	–	–	–	–	–	–	–	–	16
Reims	6	2	1	–	4	1	14	–	–	–	–	–	–	–	–	–	14
Lille	4	6	–	1	–	–	11	–	–	–	–	1	1	–	–	–	12
Strasbourg	1	3	4	–	–	–	8	–	–	–	–	1	1	–	–	–	9
Nice	4	3	–	–	1	–	8	–	–	–	–	–	–	–	–	–	8
Sochaux-Montbéliard	2	2	1	–	–	3	8	–	–	–	–	–	–	–	–	–	8
Lens	1	1	2	–	–	3	7	–	–	–	–	1	1	–	–	–	8
Auxerre	1	4	–	–	–	–	5	–	–	–	–	1	1	–	–	–	6
Racing Paris	1	5	–	–	–	–	6	–	–	–	–	–	–	–	–	–	6
Montpellier	1	2	1	–	–	–	4	–	–	–	–	1	1	–	–	–	5
Red Star	–	5	–	–	–	–	5	–	–	–	–	–	–	–	–	–	5
Sète 34	2	2	–	–	–	–	4	–	–	–	–	–	–	–	–	–	4
Rennes	–	3	–	–	1	–	4	–	–	–	–	–	–	–	–	–	4
Metz	–	2	2	–	–	–	4	–	–	–	–	–	–	–	–	–	4
Guingamp	–	2	–	–	–	–	2	–	–	–	–	1	1	–	–	–	3
Bastia	–	1	–	–	1	–	2	–	–	–	–	1	1	–	–	–	3
Sedan	–	2	–	–	1	–	3	–	–	–	–	–	–	–	–	–	3
Laval	–	–	2	–	–	–	2	–	–	–	–	–	–	–	–	–	2
CASG Paris	–	2	–	–	–	–	2	–	–	–	–	–	–	–	–	–	2
Nancy	–	1	1	–	–	–	2	–	–	–	–	–	–	–	–	–	2
Le Havre	–	1	–	–	1	–	2	–	–	–	–	–	–	–	–	–	2
Troyes	–	–	–	–	–	–	–	–	–	–	–	1	1	–	–	–	1
Olympique Lillois	1	–	–	–	–	–	1	–	–	–	–	–	–	–	–	–	1
Roubaix-Tourcoing	1	–	–	–	–	–	1	–	–	–	–	–	–	–	–	–	1
CA Paris	–	1	–	–	–	–	1	–	–	–	–	–	–	–	–	–	1
Club Français	–	1	–	–	–	–	1	–	–	–	–	–	–	–	–	–	1
Équipe fédérale Nancy-Lorraine	–	1	–	–	–	–	1	–	–	–	–	–	–	–	–	–	1
Excelsior AC Roubaix	–	1	–	–	–	–	1	–	–	–	–	–	–	–	–	–	1
Cannes	–	1	–	–	–	–	1	–	–	–	–	–	–	–	–	–	1
Lorient	–	1	–	–	–	–	1	–	–	–	–	–	–	–	–	–	1
Olympique de Paris	–	1	–	–	–	–	1	–	–	–	–	–	–	–	–	–	1
Toulouse (1937)	–	1	–	–	–	–	1	–	–	–	–	–	–	–	–	–	1
Toulouse (1970)	–	1	–	–	–	–	1	–	–	–	–	–	–	–	–	–	1
FC Gueugnon	–	–	1	–	–	–	1	–	–	–	–	–	–	–	–	–	1
Nîmes	–	–	–	–	–	1	1	–	–	–	–	–	–	–	–	–	1
Racing Besançon	–	–	–	–	–	1	1	–	–	–	–	–	–	–	–	–	1

The figures in bold represent the most times this competition has been won by a French team.
